= 2004 CFU Club Championship =

Tournament details
- Dates: 22 September – 15 December
- Teams: 8 (from 6 associations)

Final positions
- Champions: (Jamaica) Harbour View (1st title)
- Runners-up: (Jamaica) Tivoli Gardens

Tournament statistics
- Matches played: 14
- Goals scored: 68 (4.86 per match)
- Top scorer(s): (Jamaica) Jomo Gordon (Harbour View); 10 goals

The 2004 Caribbean Football Union Club Championship was an international club football competition held in the Caribbean to determine the region's qualifier to the CONCACAF Champions' Cup. The 2004 edition included eight teams from six football associations, contested on a two-legged basis. Even though two teams from Trinidad and Tobago contested the 2003 final, only one team was entered in the 2004 tournament, as compared to two from Jamaica. The inclusion of teams from Saint Martin and Montserrat and not from other Caribbean countries was never explained.

The first round included one of the great mismatches in international club history, as Harbour View of Jamaica slammed Ideal of Montserrat, 30–1 on aggregate. In an all-Jamaican final, Jomo Gordon scored in stoppage time of the second leg to give Harbour View a 3–2 aggregate win over Tivoli Gardens, thereby advancing to the 2005 CONCACAF Champions' Cup.

== Teams ==
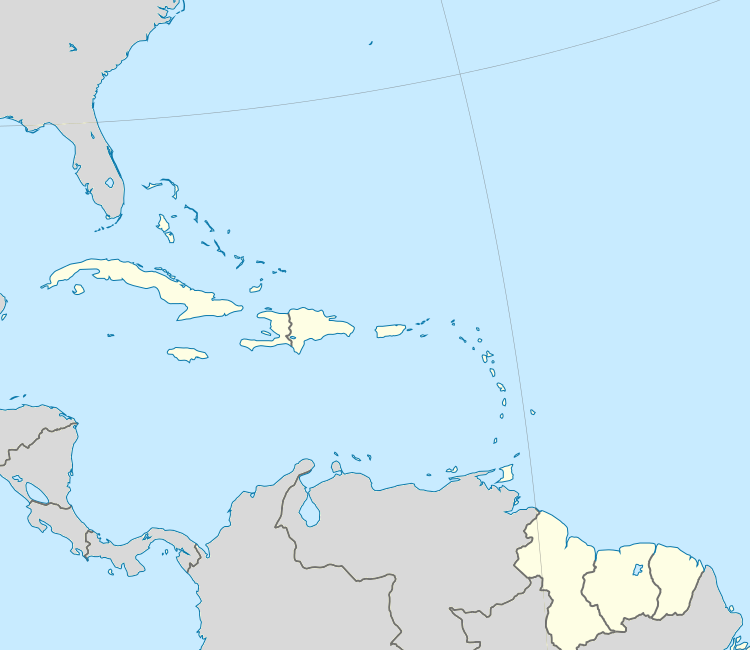
Location of teams of the 2004 CFU Club Championship

Association	Team	Qualification method	App. (last)	Previous best (last)
Antigua and Barbuda	Bassa	2003–04 Antigua and Barbuda Premier Division winners	1st	Debut
Jamaica	Tivoli Gardens	2003–04 Jamaica Premier League champions	2nd (2000)	First round (2000)
Jamaica	Harbour View	2003–04 Jamaica Premier League runners-up	3rd (2002)	Third place (2000)
Montserrat	Ideal	2004 Montserrat Championship winners	1st	Debut
Saint Martin	Juventus de Saint-Martin	2003–04 Saint-Martin Senior League champions	1st	Debut
Suriname	WBC	2003–04 SVB Eerste Divisie champions	1st	Debut
Suriname	Inter Moengotapoe	2003–04 SVB Eerste Divisie runners-up	1st	Debut
Trinidad and Tobago	San Juan Jabloteh	2003–04 TT Premier Football League champions	3rd (2003)	Champions (2003)

== Bracket ==
First round
(Suriname) Inter Moengotapoe	2	1	3
(Collectivity of Saint Martin) Juventus de Saint-Martin	0	1	1
(Montserrat) Ideal	1	0	1
(Jamaica) Harbour View	15	15	30
(Trinidad and Tobago) San Juan Jabloteh	3	0	3
(Suriname) WBC	1	0	1
(Antigua and Barbuda) Bassa	2	0	2
(Jamaica) Tivoli Gardens	1	3	4

Semi-finals
(Suriname) Inter Moengotapoe	4	2	6
(Jamaica) Harbour View	6	3	9
(Trinidad and Tobago) San Juan Jabloteh	1	0	1
(Jamaica) Tivoli Gardens	1	1	2

Final
(Jamaica) Harbour View	1	2	3
(Jamaica) Tivoli Gardens	1	1	2

== Matches ==
=== First round ===
Team 1	Agg.	Team 2	1st leg	2nd leg
San Juan Jabloteh (Trinidad and Tobago)	3–1	(Suriname) WBC	3–1	0–0
Inter Moengotapoe (Suriname)	3–1	(Collectivity of Saint Martin) Juventus de Saint Martin	2–0	1–1
Bassa (Antigua and Barbuda)	2–4	(Jamaica) Tivoli Gardens	2–1	0–3
Ideal (Montserrat)	1–30	(Jamaica) Harbour View	1–15	0–15

=== Matches ===
22 September 2004

San Juan Jabloteh (Trinidad and Tobago)	3–1	(Suriname) WBC
Baptiste 37'; Daniel 57'; Mitchell 90'		Donavan 13'

Hasely Crawford Stadium, Port of Spain
26 September 2004

WBC (Suriname)	0–0	(Trinidad and Tobago) San Juan Jabloteh

Dr. Ir. Franklin Essed Stadion, Paramaribo

San Juan Jabloteh won 3–1 on aggregate.

22 September 2004

Inter Moengotapoe (Suriname)	2–0	(Collectivity of Saint Martin) Juventus de Saint Martin
Pinas 7'; Vlijter 90+'

Dr. Ir. Franklin Essed Stadion, Paramaribo
29 September 2004

Juventus de Saint Martin (Collectivity of Saint Martin)	1–1	(Suriname) Inter Moengotapoe
Cherubin 40'		M. Bron 78'

Stade Alberic Richards, Sandy Ground

Inter Moengotapoe won 3–1 on aggregate.

15 October 2004

Bassa (Antigua and Barbuda)	2–1	(Jamaica) Tivoli Gardens
Williams 21' (pen.); Thomas 26'		Morgan 90'

Antigua Recreation Ground, St. John's
17 October 2004

Tivoli Gardens (Jamaica)	3–0	(Antigua and Barbuda) Bassa
Dean 4', 54'; Hyde 59'

Antigua Recreation Ground, St. John's

Tivoli Gardens won 4–2 on aggregate.

22 October 2004

Ideal (Montserrat)	1–15	(Jamaica) Harbour View
Munroe 38'		Grant 27', 61'; Shelton 35', 36', 44', 50'; Hue 39', 45+', 56'; Waugh 42'; Gordon 65', 86', 88'; Fraser 85'; Priestley 89'

Blakes Estate Stadium, Lookout
24 October 2004

Harbour View (Jamaica)	15–0	(Montserrat) Ideal
McCreath 5', 14', 19', 45+'; D. Stewart 8' (pen.); Shelton 10'; Priestley 12'; C. Stewart 44', 49'; Gordon 56', 65', 66', 75'; Richards 84'; Palmer 90'

Blakes Estate Stadium, Lookout

Harbour View won 30–1 on aggregate.

=== Semi-finals ===
Team 1	Agg.	Team 2	1st leg	2nd leg
Inter Moengotapoe (Suriname)	6–9	(Jamaica) Harbour View	4–6	2–3
San Juan Jabloteh (Trinidad and Tobago)	1–2	(Jamaica) Tivoli Gardens	1–1	0–1

=== Matches ===
3 November 2004

Inter Moengotapoe (Suriname)	4–6	(Jamaica) Harbour View
J. Bron 9', 76'; N/A 39' (o.g.); Pinas 60'		C. Stewart 4'; Shelton 16', 57', 90'; Gordon 64'; McCreath 80'

Dr. Ir. Franklin Essed Stadion, Paramaribo
5 November 2004

Harbour View (Jamaica)	3–2	(Suriname) Inter Moengotapoe
Shelton 31'; Hue 80'; Gordon 84'		Pinas 43'; Vlyter 52'

Dr. Ir. Franklin Essed Stadion, Paramaribo

Harbour View won 9–6 on aggregate.

3 November 2004

San Juan Jabloteh (Trinidad and Tobago)	1–1	(Jamaica) Tivoli Gardens
Daniel 83'		Davis 58'

Hasely Crawford Stadium, Port of Spain
10 November 2004

Tivoli Gardens (Jamaica)	1–0	(Trinidad and Tobago) San Juan Jabloteh
Gillings 57'

Railway Oval, Tivoli Gardens

Tivoli Gardens won 2–1 on aggregate.

=== Final ===
Harbour View were crowned champions and advanced to the 2005 CONCACAF Champions' Cup.

Team 1	Agg.	Team 2	1st leg	2nd leg
Harbour View (Jamaica)	3–2	(Jamaica) Tivoli Gardens	1–1	2–1

=== Matches ===
8 December 2004

Harbour View (Jamaica)	1–1	(Jamaica) Tivoli Gardens
Priestley 81'		Nicholas 14'

Harbour View Stadium, Harbour View
15 December 2004

Tivoli Gardens (Jamaica)	1–2	(Jamaica) Harbour View
Davis 58'		C. Stewart 25'; Gordon 90+'

Railway Oval, Tivoli Gardens

Harbour View won 3–2 on aggregate.

== Top scorers ==
	Player	Club	Goals
1	(Jamaica) Jomo Gordon	Harbour View	10
2	(Jamaica) Luton Shelton	Harbour View	9
3	(Jamaica) Nicholas McCreath	Harbour View	5
4	(Jamaica) Jermaine Hue	Harbour View	4
4	(Jamaica) Craig Stewart	Harbour View	4
6	(Suriname) Claudio Pinas	Inter Moengotapoe	3
6	(Jamaica) Akeem Priestley	Harbour View	3
