= 2001 Montserrat Championship =

Montserrat Championship
- Season: 2001
- Champions: Royal Montserrat Police Force
- Relegated: none
- Matches: 20
- Goals: 130 (6.5 per match)
- Top goalscorer: Ottley Laborde - 21

The 2001 season of the Montserrat Championship was the sixth recorded season of top flight association football competition in Montserrat, with records for any competition held between 1975 and 1995 not available, and the second iteration of the championship since the 1996–97 season was abandoned when the Soufrière Hills erupted causing widespread devastation to the island. The championship was won by the Royal Montserrat Police Force, their fourth title out of the five completed seasons to date.

== League table ==
Pos	Team	Pld	W	D	L	GF	GA	GD	Pts
1	Royal Montserrat Police Force (C)	8	7	1	0	49	6	+43	22
2	Ideal Boys	8	5	1	2	27	9	+18	16
3	Montserrat Volcano Observatory Tremors	8	5	0	3	29	20	+9	15
4	Montserrat Secondary School	8	1	1	6	14	42	−28	4
5	Seventh Day Adventists Trendsetters	8	0	1	7	11	25	−14	1

Updated to match(es) played on final day of the season. Source:
Rules for classification: 1) points; 2) goal difference; 3) number of goals scored.
(C) Champions

== Top scorers ==
Position	Player	Team	Goals
1st	(Montserrat) Ottley Laborde	Royal Montserrat Police Force	21
2nd	(Montserrat) Mark Stephany	Royal Montserrat Police Force	13
3rd	(Montserrat) Neil Jones	Montserrat Volcano Observatory Tremors	6
3rd	(Montserrat) Joseph Morris		6

== Awards ==
At the prize-giving ceremony, five prizes were awarded as follows:

- League Winners: Police
- Most Improved Team: MSS
- Most Disciplined Team: Police
- Fair Play: Ideal
- Most Improved Player: Kelvin Ponde
