= 2023–24 CONCACAF Nations League B =

Tournament details
- Dates: 7 September 2023 – 21 November 2023
- Teams: 16
- Promoted: French Guiana; Guadeloupe; Guyana; Nicaragua
- Relegated: Bahamas; Barbados; Belize; Saint Kitts and Nevis

Tournament statistics
- Matches played: 47
- Goals scored: 177 (3.77 per match)
- Top scorer(s): (Guyana) Omari Glasgow (7 goals)

The 2023–24 CONCACAF Nations League B was the second division of the 2023–24 edition of the CONCACAF Nations League, the third season of the international football competition involving the men's national teams of the 41 member associations of CONCACAF. It was held from 7 September to 21 November 2023.

== Format ==
Unlike Leagues A and C, League B maintained the same format as in previous editions. League B consisted of sixteen teams which were split into four groups of four teams. The teams competed in a home-and-away, round-robin format over the course of the group phase, with matches being played in the official FIFA match windows in September, October and November 2023. The first-placed team of each group was promoted to the 2024–25 CONCACAF Nations League A and the fourth-placed team of each group was relegated to the 2024–25 CONCACAF Nations League C.

== Teams ==
A total of sixteen national teams contested the League B, including twelve sides from the 2022–23 season and four promoted from the 2022–23 League C. As a result of the expansion to 16 teams in the League A, there were no teams relegated to the League C from the previous season, so the fourth placed team of each group from the 2022-23 season remained in the League B for this edition.

=== Team changes ===
The following were the team changes of League B from the 2022–23 season:

Incoming
Promoted from
Nations League C
- Puerto Rico
- Saint Lucia
- Saint Kitts and Nevis
- Sint Maarten

Outgoing
Promoted to
Nations League A
- Cuba
- Guatemala
- Haiti
- Trinidad and Tobago

Nicaragua had originally qualified for promotion to League A as League B Group C winners, but they were disqualified for fielding an ineligible player. As a result, on 12 June 2023, they were replaced by Trinidad and Tobago in League A, and they were forced to stay in League B, replacing Trinidad and Tobago.

==== Teams promoted from League C ====
Saint Kitts and Nevis and Saint Lucia returned to the League B after a one-season absence. Puerto Rico and Sint Maarten reached the second division of the CONCACAF Nations League for the first time after spending the first two seasons in League C.

=== Seeding ===
The pots were confirmed on 2 May 2023, with the sixteen League B teams being split into four pots of four teams, based on the CONCACAF Rankings as of 31 March 2023.

Pot 1
Team	Pts	Rank
Trinidad and Tobago	1,254	11
French Guiana	1,086	15
Guyana	994	18
Guadeloupe	966	19

Pot 2
Team	Pts	Rank
Antigua and Barbuda	949	20
Saint Kitts and Nevis	923	21
Dominican Republic	913	22
Bermuda	863	23

Pot 3
Team	Pts	Rank
Saint Lucia	795	24
Puerto Rico	790	26
Montserrat	780	27
Saint Vincent and the Grenadines	726	28

Pot 4
Team	Pts	Rank
Belize	715	29
Barbados	681	30
Bahamas	530	34
Sint Maarten	413	37

=== Draw ===
The groups draw was held on 16 May 2023, 19:00 EDT, in Miami, Florida, United States, where the sixteen involved teams were drawn into four groups of four. The draw began by randomly selecting a team from Pot 1 and placing them in Group A and then selecting the remaining teams from Pot 1 and placling them into Groups B, C and D in sequential order. The draw continued with the same procedure done for the remaining pots.

The draw resulted in the following groups:

Group A
Pos	Team
A1	Guadeloupe
A2	Saint Kitts and Nevis
A3	Saint Lucia
A4	Sint Maarten

Group B
Pos	Team
B1	Trinidad and Tobago
B2	Dominican Republic
B3	Montserrat
B4	Barbados

Group C
Pos	Team
C1	French Guiana
C2	Bermuda
C3	Saint Vincent and the Grenadines
C4	Belize

Group D
Pos	Team
D1	Guyana
D2	Antigua and Barbuda
D3	Puerto Rico
D4	Bahamas

Note

1. ^{†} Trinidad and Tobago was later replaced by Nicaragua, which was relegated from the League A.

== Groups ==
The fixture list was confirmed by CONCACAF on 6 July 2023. All match times are in EDT (UTC−4) for September and October matches and EST (UTC−5) for November matches, as listed by CONCACAF (local times, if different, are in parentheses).

=== Group A ===
Pos	Team	Pld	W	D	L	GF	GA	GD	Pts	Promotion or relegation	(Guadeloupe)	(Saint Lucia)	(Sint Maarten)	(Saint Kitts and Nevis)
1	Guadeloupe (P)	6	5	0	1	16	3	+13	15	Promotion to League A	—	2–0	4–0	5–0
2	Saint Lucia	6	3	1	2	10	6	+4	10		2–1	—	1–2	2–0
3	Sint Maarten	6	2	0	4	6	15	−9	6		0–2	1–5	—	2–3
4	Saint Kitts and Nevis (R)	6	1	1	4	4	12	−8	4	Relegation to League C	1–2	0–0	0–1	—

Source: CONCACAF
Rules for classification: Tiebreakers
(P) Promoted; (R) Relegated
7 September 2023
18:00

Sint Maarten	1–5	Saint Lucia
Amatkarijo 51'	Report	Poleon 45', 48', 89'; Hackett-Fairchild 57'; Stanislas 75'

Stadion Rignaal 'Jean' Francisca, Willemstad (Curaçao)
Referee: Ricangel de Leça (Aruba)
7 September 2023
19:00

Saint Kitts and Nevis	1–2	Guadeloupe
Williams 45+2'	Report	Archimède 24'; Arconte 77'

SKNFA Technical Center, Basseterre
Referee: Filiberto Martínez (El Salvador)

10 September 2023
15:30

Guadeloupe	4–0	Sint Maarten
Phaëton 23' (pen.); Plumain 25' (pen.), 58'; Archimède 40'	Report

Stade Municipal de Sainte-Anne, Sainte-Anne
Referee: Pierre-Luc Lauzière (Canada)
10 September 2023
19:00

Saint Lucia	2–0	Saint Kitts and Nevis
President 49'; Stanislas 75'	Report

Daren Sammy Cricket Ground, Gros Islet
Referee: Moeth Gaymes (Saint Vincent and the Grenadines)

12 October 2023
15:00

Sint Maarten	2–3	Saint Kitts and Nevis
Lake 19'; Kort 79'	Report	Williams 16', 48', 68'

Raymond E. Guishard Technical Centre, The Valley (Anguilla)
Attendance: 122
Referee: Josué Ugalde (Costa Rica)
12 October 2023
20:00 (Note: The Saint Lucia v Guadeloupe match, originally scheduled at 17:00 EDT (UTC−4), was re-scheduled to 20:00 EDT.)

Saint Lucia	2–1	Guadeloupe
Elva 45'; Mac Farlane 58'	Report	Roussillon 29'

Daren Sammy Cricket Ground, Gros Islet
Attendance: 2,700
Referee: Oshane Nation (Jamaica)

15 October 2023
15:30

Guadeloupe	2–0	Saint Lucia
Plumain 52' (pen.), 71'	Report

Stade Municipal de Sainte-Anne, Sainte-Anne
Attendance: 580
Referee: Nicolas Wassouf (Martinique)
15 October 2023
19:00

Saint Kitts and Nevis	0–1	Sint Maarten
	Report	Pata 32'

SKNFA Technical Center, Basseterre
Referee: Yadel Martínez (Cuba)

16 November 2023
18:00 (19:00 UTC−4)

Saint Kitts and Nevis	0–0	Saint Lucia
	Report

SKNFA Technical Center, Basseterre
Attendance: 120
Referee: David Gómez (Costa Rica)
16 November 2023
18:00 (19:00 UTC−4)

Sint Maarten	0–2	Guadeloupe
	Report	Plumain 65'; Phaëton 90+5'

Wildey Turf, Wildey (Barbados)
Attendance: 28
Referee: Reon Radix (Grenada)

19 November 2023
14:00 (15:00 UTC−4)

Guadeloupe	5–0	Saint Kitts and Nevis
Phaëton 19'; Arconte 74', 90'; Bevis 76'; Roussillon 80'	Report

Stade Municipal de Sainte-Anne, Sainte-Anne
Referee: Daniel Quintero (Mexico)
19 November 2023
14:00 (15:00 UTC−4)

Saint Lucia	1–2	Sint Maarten
Thomas 12'	Report	Amatkarijo 38'; Lake 56'

Daren Sammy Cricket Ground, Gros Islet
Referee: Marco Ortíz (Mexico)

=== Group B ===
Pos	Team	Pld	W	D	L	GF	GA	GD	Pts	Promotion or relegation	(Nicaragua)	(Dominican Republic)	(Montserrat)	(Barbados)
1	Nicaragua (P)	6	5	1	0	17	1	+16	16	Promotion to League A	—	0–0	3–0	5–1
2	Dominican Republic	6	3	1	2	14	6	+8	10		0–2	—	3–0	5–2
3	Montserrat	6	3	0	3	9	14	−5	9		0–3	2–1	—	4–2
4	Barbados (R)	6	0	0	6	7	26	−19	0	Relegation to League C	0–4	0–5	2–3	—

Source: CONCACAF
Rules for classification: Tiebreakers
(P) Promoted; (R) Relegated
8 September 2023
19:00

Dominican Republic	0–2	Nicaragua
	Report	Acevedo 38', 41'

Estadio Olímpico Félix Sánchez, Santo Domingo
Referee: Patrick Senecharles (Haiti)
8 September 2023
19:00

Barbados	2–3	Montserrat
Downey 8'; Gale 26'	Report	Taylor 6', 90+8'; Codrington 81' (o.g.)

Wildey Turf, Wildey
Referee: Ken Pennyfeather (Antigua and Barbuda)

11 September 2023 (Note: The order of matches between Dominican Republic and Montserrat were reversed from the original schedule due to access challenges for teams and officials travelling to Montserrat.)
19:00

Dominican Republic	3–0	Montserrat
Dorsett 3' (o.g.); Romero 25', 64'	Report

Estadio Olímpico Félix Sánchez, Santo Domingo
Referee: Oshane Nation (Jamaica)
11 September 2023
22:00 (20:00 UTC−6)

Nicaragua	5–1	Barbados
Smith 11'; Pérez 40'; Moreno 45+1', 76'; Montes 69'	Report	Gale 89'

Estadio Nacional de Fútbol, Managua
Referee: Bryan López (Guatemala)

13 October 2023
15:00

Montserrat	0–3	Nicaragua
	Report	Pérez 5'; Medina 72'; Montes 90+4'

Wildey Turf, Wildey (Barbados) (Note: Montserrat played their home match against Nicaragua at the Wildey Turf stadium in Wildey (Barbados) due to flight issues.)
Attendance: 60
Referee: Jorge Leira (Panama)
13 October 2023
20:00 (Note: The Barbados v Dominican Republic match, originally scheduled at 19:00 EDT (UTC−4), was re-scheduled to 20:00 EDT.)

Barbados	0–5	Dominican Republic
	Report	Romero 7'; Reyes 21'; Griffith 45' (o.g.); Mörschel 57'; Alba 88'

Wildey Turf, Wildey
Attendance: 1,215
Referee: Benjamin Whitty (Cayman Islands)

16 October 2023
22:00 (20:00 UTC−6)

Nicaragua	3–0	Montserrat
Pérez 38'; Coronel 43'; Moldskred Belli 48'	Report

Estadio Nacional de Fútbol, Managua
Attendance: 12,457
Referee: José Valladares (Honduras)
16 October 2023
22:00 (Note: The Dominican Republic v Barbados match, originally scheduled at Estadio Complejo Deportivo Moca 86 in Moca, 20:00 EDT (UTC−4), was re-scheduled to the Estadio Cibao FC in Santiago de los Caballeros, 22:00 EDT due to heavy rainfall in the city of Moca.)

Dominican Republic	5–2	Barbados
Alba 17'; Romero 30', 48', 79'; Mörschel 59'	Report	Gale 10' (pen.), 66' (pen.)

Estadio Cibao FC, Santiago de los Caballeros
Attendance: 350
Referee: Nima Saghafi (United States)

17 November 2023
14:00 (15:00 UTC−4)

Montserrat	2–1	Dominican Republic
Barzey 37'; Simon 57'	Report	Reyes 75'

Blakes Estate Stadium, Lookout
Attendance: 290
Referee: Yadel Martínez (Cuba)
17 November 2023
18:00 (19:00 UTC−4)

Barbados	0–4	Nicaragua
	Report	Arteaga 22' (pen.); Rodríguez 43'; Coronel 55'; Montes 59'

Wildey Turf, Wildey
Referee: Kwinsi Williams (Trinidad and Tobago)

20 November 2023
14:00 (15:00 UTC−4)

Montserrat	4–2	Barbados
Barzey 33'; Dyer 35'; Daniels 62'; Richmond 88'	Report	Jules 47'; James 90+4'

Blakes Estate Stadium, Lookout
Referee: Moeth Gaymes (Saint Vincent and the Grenadines)
21 November 2023 (Note: The Nicaragua v Dominican Republic match, originally scheduled on 20 November 2023, was re-scheduled to be played on 21 November 2023.)
21:00 (20:00 UTC−6)

Nicaragua	0–0	Dominican Republic
	Report

Estadio Nacional de Fútbol, Managua
Referee: Ignacio Fuentes (Guatemala)

=== Group C ===
Pos	Team	Pld	W	D	L	GF	GA	GD	Pts	Promotion or relegation	(French Guiana)	(Saint Vincent and the Grenadines)	(Bermuda)	(Belize)
1	French Guiana (P)	6	3	1	2	10	6	+4	10	Promotion to League A	—	3–2	3–0	0–2
2	Saint Vincent and the Grenadines	6	3	0	3	13	14	−1	9		1–4	—	4–3	3–0
3	Bermuda	6	2	2	2	8	9	−1	8		0–0	3–1	—	1–1
4	Belize (R)	6	2	1	3	5	7	−2	7	Relegation to League C	1–0	1–2	0–1	—

Source: CONCACAF
Rules for classification: Tiebreakers
(P) Promoted; (R) Relegated
8 September 2023
16:00 (Note: The Bermuda v French Guiana match, originally scheduled at 19:30 EDT (UTC−4), was re-scheduled to 16:00 EDT.) (17:00 UTC−3)

Bermuda	0–0	French Guiana
	Report

Dame Flora Duffy National Sports Centre, Devonshire Parish
Referee: Jefferson Escobar (Honduras)
8 September 2023
16:00 (Note: The Belize v Saint Vincent and the Grenadines match, originally scheduled at 17:00 EDT (UTC−4), was re-scheduled to 16:00 EDT.)

Belize	1–2	Saint Vincent and the Grenadines
Mensah 18'	Report	Simmons 51'; Nembhard 79' (o.g.)

Stade Pierre-Aliker, Fort-de-France (Martinique) (Note: Belize played their home match against Saint Vincent and the Grenadines at the Stade Pierre-Aliker in Fort-de-France (Martinique) following a joint decision of both the Football Federation of Belize (FFB) and the Saint Vincent and the Grenadines Football Federation (SVGFF) to play on a neutral venue due to both federations expressed having "flight issues” in getting to their destination for their next matches on 12 September.)
Referee: Oliver Vergara (Panama)

12 September 2023
15:30

Saint Vincent and the Grenadines	4–3	Bermuda
Anderson 40', 42', 45+2'; Sutherland 63'	Report	Bean 21'; Coddington 69'; Simmons 74'

Arnos Vale Stadium, Kingstown
Referee: Joe Dickerson (United States)
12 September 2023
15:30 (16:30 UTC−3)

French Guiana	0–2	Belize
	Report	Polanco 64'; Cappello 68'

Stade Municipal Dr. Edmard Lama, Remire-Montjoly
Referee: Hakeem Harvey (Saint Kitts and Nevis)

13 October 2023
15:30

Saint Vincent and the Grenadines	1–4	French Guiana
Sutherland 31'	Report	Némouthé 7'; Abelinti 11' (pen.); Baal 42'; Haabo 81'

Arnos Vale Stadium, Kingstown
Attendance: 2,500
Referee: Steffon Dewar (Jamaica)
13 October 2023
22:00 (20:00 UTC−6)

Belize	0–1	Bermuda
	Report	Crichlow 18'

FFB Stadium, Belmopan
Attendance: 842
Referee: Juan Gabriel Calderón (Costa Rica)

16 October 2023 (Note: The French Guiana v Saint Vincent and the Grenadines match, originally scheduled on 17 October 2023, 15:00 EDT (UTC−4), was re-scheduled to 16 October 2023, 19:00 EDT.)
19:00

French Guiana	3–2	Saint Vincent and the Grenadines
Némouthé 9' (pen.); Gaubert 44'; Haabo 76'	Report	Stewart 16', 73'

Stade Pierre-Aliker, Fort-de-France (Martinique) (Note: The French Guiana v Saint Vincent and the Grenadines match, originally scheduled at Stade Municipal Dr. Edmard Lama, Remire-Montjoly, was re-scheduled to be played at the Stade Pierre-Aliker in Fort-de-France (Martinique) due to French Guiana's home stadium not meeting CONCACAF requirements.)
Attendance: 51
Referee: Pierre-Luc Lauzière (Canada)
17 October 2023
18:30 (19:30 UTC−3)

Bermuda	1–1	Belize
Crichlow 37'	Report	Reneau 75' (pen.)

Dame Flora Duffy National Sports Centre, Devonshire Parish
Attendance: 818
Referee: David Gómez (Costa Rica)

17 November 2023
17:30 (18:30 UTC−4)

Bermuda	3–1	Saint Vincent and the Grenadines
Tucker 6'; Crichlow 44'; Parfitt-Williams 50'	Report	McBurnette 34'

Dame Flora Duffy National Sports Centre, Devonshire Parish
Referee: Jaime Herrera (El Salvador)
17 November 2023
21:00 (20:00 UTC−6)

Belize	1–0	French Guiana
Martínez 90+6'	Report

FFB Stadium, Belmopan
Referee: Jefferson Escobar (Honduras)

21 November 2023
14:00 (15:00 UTC−4)

French Guiana	3–0	Bermuda
Ajaiso 29'; Lo. Baal 49'; Sarrucco 90+4'	Report

Stade Pierre-Aliker, Fort-de-France (Martinique) (Note: French Guiana played their home match against Bermuda at the Stade Pierre-Aliker in Fort-de-France (Martinique) due to the field of their regular home stadium Stade Municipal Dr. Edmard Lama, Remire-Montjoly not meeting CONCACAF requirements.)
Referee: José Torres (Puerto Rico)
21 November 2023
14:00 (15:00 UTC−4)

Saint Vincent and the Grenadines	3–0	Belize
Spring 3'; Edwards 84'; Velox 85'	Report

Kirani James Athletic Stadium, St. George's (Grenada) (Note: Saint Vincent and the Grenadines played their home match against Belize at the Kirani James Athletic Stadium in St. George's (Grenada) due to their regular home stadium Arnos Vale Stadium undergoing rehabilitation in preparation for hosting matches at the 2024 ICC Men's T20 World Cup.)
Referee: Kimbell Ward (Saint Kitts and Nevis)

=== Group D ===
Pos	Team	Pld	W	D	L	GF	GA	GD	Pts	Promotion or relegation	(Guyana)	(Puerto Rico)	(Antigua and Barbuda)	(The Bahamas)
1	Guyana (P)	5	5	0	0	20	5	+15	15	Promotion to League A	—	3–1	6–0	3–2
2	Puerto Rico	6	4	0	2	22	10	+12	12		1–3	—	5–0	6–1
3	Antigua and Barbuda	6	1	1	4	9	22	−13	4		1–5	2–3	—	2–2
4	Bahamas (R)	5	0	1	4	7	21	−14	1	Relegation to League C	Canc.	1–6	1–4	—

Source: CONCACAF
Rules for classification: Tiebreakers
(P) Promoted; (R) Relegated
9 September 2023
15:30

Antigua and Barbuda	1–5	Guyana
Deterville 45'	Report	Glasgow 14', 29' (pen.), 87'; Benjamin 33'; Cordice 62' (o.g.)

ABFA Technical Center, Piggotts
Referee: Mario Escobar (Guatemala)
9 September 2023
18:00

Bahamas	1–6	Puerto Rico
Rahming 2'	Report	Díaz 6'; R. Rivera 14'; Burgos 35', 86', 89'; Sulia 42'

Thomas Robinson Stadium, Nassau
Referee: Julio Luna (Guatemala)

12 September 2023
18:00

Guyana	3–2	Bahamas
Glasgow 44'; Duke-McKenna 54'; Benjamin 58'	Report	Julmis 39' (pen.), 86' (pen.)

Synthetic Track and Field Facility, Leonora
Referee: Shekiel Jokil (Suriname)
12 September 2023
19:00

Puerto Rico	5–0	Antigua and Barbuda
Díaz 15', 46', 90'; R. Rivera 39' (pen.), 43'	Report

Thomas Robinson Stadium, Nassau (Bahamas) (Note: Puerto Rico played their home match against Antigua and Barbuda at the Thomas Robinson Stadium in Nassau (Bahamas) due to their home stadiums (Juan Ramón Loubriel Stadium in Bayamón and Mayagüez Athletics Stadium in Mayagüez) undergoing renovation.)
Referee: Melvin Matamoros (Honduras)

14 October 2023
15:00

Puerto Rico	1–3	Guyana
Antonetti 11'	Report	Glasgow 60' (pen.); Benjamin 63'; Moore 85'

SKNFA Technical Center, Basseterre (Saint Kitts and Nevis) (Note: The Puerto Rico v Guyana match, originally scheduled at the Centro de Desarrollo de Fútbol del Oeste in Añasco, was re-scheduled to the SKNFA Technical Center in Basseterre (Saint Kitts and Nevis) due to Puerto Rico's home stadium undergoing renovation.)
Referee: Ismael Cornejo (El Salvador)
14 October 2023
18:00

Bahamas	1–4	Antigua and Barbuda
Julmis 62'	Report	Stevens 3', 9'; Bramble 43'; Griffith 77' (pen.)

Thomas Robinson Stadium, Nassau
Attendance: 438
Referee: Sergio Reyna (Guatemala)

17 October 2023
15:30

Antigua and Barbuda	2–2	Bahamas
Parker 54'; Bramble 59'	Report	Wells 5'; Johnson 82'

ABFA Technical Center, Piggotts
Attendance: 415
Referee: Reon Radix (Grenada)
17 October 2023
16:00

Guyana	3–1	Puerto Rico
Moriah-Welsh 48'; Moore 76'; Glasgow 85'	Report	Díaz 41'

SKNFA Technical Center, Basseterre (Saint Kitts and Nevis) (Note: The Guyana v Puerto Rico match, originally scheduled at the Synthetic Track and Field Facility in Leonora, was re-scheduled at the SKNFA Technical Center in Basseterre (Saint Kitts and Nevis) due to Guyana's stadium not meeting CONCACAF requirements.)
Referee: Sergio Rozenhout (Suriname) (Note: Referee Benjamín Pineda from Costa Rica, who was originally assigned to the Guyana v Puerto Rico match, was replaced by the fourth official Sergio Rozenhout from Suriname.)

18 November 2023
14:00 (15:00 UTC−4)

Antigua and Barbuda	2–3	Puerto Rico
Pereira 52'; Deterville 54'	Report	W. Rivera 7', 58'; Ríos 33'

ABFA Technical Center, Piggotts
Referee: Benjamin Whitty (Cayman Islands)

21 November 2023
19:00 (20:00 UTC−4)

Guyana	6–0	Antigua and Barbuda
Benjamin 7'; Glasgow 36'; Moriah-Welsh 45'; De Rosario 67'; Lovell 90'; Moore 90+3'	Report

Estadio Olímpico Félix Sánchez, Santo Domingo (Dominican Republic)
Referee: Sergio Rozenhout (Suriname)
21 November 2023
19:00 (20:00 UTC−4)

Puerto Rico	6–1	Bahamas
R. Rivera 2', 6', 19'; Ríos 39'; Díaz 74'; W. Rivera 77' (pen.)	Report	Joseph 53'

Juan Ramón Loubriel Stadium, Bayamón
Referee: Steffon Dewar (Jamaica)

19 November 2023

Bahamas	Cancelled (Note: The Bahamas–Guyana match was postponed from its original start time (19 November at 17:00) due to multiple days of adverse weather. CONCACAF subsequently cancelled the match on 19 April 2024.)	Guyana
	Report

Estadio Olímpico Félix Sánchez, Santo Domingo (Dominican Republic)
Referee: Rubiel Vazquez (United States)

== Goalscorers ==
There were 177 goals scored in 47 matches, for an average of 3.77 goals per match.

7 goals

- (Guyana) Omari Glasgow

6 goals

- (Dominican Republic) Dorny Romero
- (Puerto Rico) Gerald Díaz
- (Puerto Rico) Ricardo Rivera

5 goals

- (Guadeloupe) Ange-Freddy Plumain

4 goals

- (Barbados) Thierry Gale
- (Guyana) Kelsey Benjamin
- (Saint Kitts and Nevis) Tiquanny Williams

3 goals

- (The Bahamas) Wood Julmis
- (Bermuda) Kane Crichlow
- (Guadeloupe) Taïryk Arconte
- (Guadeloupe) Matthias Phaëton
- (Guyana) Deon Moore
- (Nicaragua) Jacob Montes
- (Nicaragua) Juan Luis Pérez
- (Puerto Rico) Joel Burgos
- (Puerto Rico) Wilfredo Rivera
- (Saint Lucia) Dominic Poleon
- (Saint Vincent and the Grenadines) Oalex Anderson

2 goals

- (Antigua and Barbuda) TJ Bramble
- (Antigua and Barbuda) Raheem Deterville
- (Antigua and Barbuda) Javorn Stevens
- (Dominican Republic) Riki Alba
- (Dominican Republic) Heinz Mörschel
- (Dominican Republic) Edarlyn Reyes
- (French Guiana) Loïc Baal
- (French Guiana) Jules Haabo
- (French Guiana) Thomas Némouthé
- (Guadeloupe) Luther Archimède
- (Guadeloupe) Jérôme Roussillon
- (Guyana) Nathan Moriah-Welsh
- (Montserrat) Brandon Barzey
- (Montserrat) Lyle Taylor
- (Nicaragua) Óscar Acevedo
- (Nicaragua) Luis Coronel
- (Nicaragua) Jaime Moreno
- (Puerto Rico) Darren Ríos
- (Saint Lucia) Ridel Stanislas
- (Saint Vincent and the Grenadines) Cornelius Stewart
- (Saint Vincent and the Grenadines) Jahvin Sutherland
- (Sint Maarten) Chovanie Amatkarijo
- (Sint Maarten) Gerwin Lake

1 goal

- (Antigua and Barbuda) Quinton Griffith
- (Antigua and Barbuda) Josh Parker
- (Antigua and Barbuda) Dion Pereira
- (The Bahamas) Nahum Johnson
- (The Bahamas) Marcel Joseph
- (The Bahamas) Christopher Rahming
- (The Bahamas) Nathan Wells
- (Barbados) Elijah Downey
- (Barbados) Tajio James
- (Barbados) Rashad Jules
- (Belize) Angelo Cappello
- (Belize) Nana Mensah
- (Belize) Jordy Polanco
- (Belize) Eldon Reneau
- (Belize) Eugene Martínez
- (Bermuda) Jai Bean
- (Bermuda) Remy Coddington
- (Bermuda) Djair Parfitt-Williams
- (Bermuda) Lejaun Simmons
- (Bermuda) Ne-Jai Tucker
- (French Guiana) Arnold Abelinti
- (French Guiana) Albert Ajaiso
- (French Guiana) Franz Gaubert
- (French Guiana) Joel Sarrucco
- (Guadeloupe) Kilian Bevis
- (Guyana) Osaze De Rosario
- (Guyana) Stephen Duke-McKenna
- (Guyana) Leo Lovell
- (Montserrat) Donervon Daniels
- (Montserrat) Josiah Dyer
- (Montserrat) Dominic Richmond
- (Montserrat) Kaleem Strawbridge
- (Nicaragua) Junior Arteaga
- (Nicaragua) Harold Medina
- (Nicaragua) Matías Moldskred Belli
- (Nicaragua) Nextaly Rodríguez
- (Nicaragua) Ariagner Smith
- (Puerto Rico) Leandro Antonetti
- (Puerto Rico) Rodolfo Sulia
- (Saint Lucia) Caniggia Elva
- (Saint Lucia) Reeco Hackett-Fairchild
- (Saint Lucia) Jevick Mac Farlane
- (Saint Lucia) Gregson President
- (Saint Lucia) Terell Thomas
- (Saint Vincent and the Grenadines) Kyle Edwards
- (Saint Vincent and the Grenadines) Nazir McBurnette
- (Saint Vincent and the Grenadines) Marlon Simmons
- (Saint Vincent and the Grenadines) Diel Spring
- (Saint Vincent and the Grenadines) Oryan Velox
- (Sint Maarten) Imar Kort
- (Sint Maarten) Ilounga Pata

1 own goal

- (Antigua and Barbuda) Roneba Cordice (against Guyana)
- (Barbados) Shane Codrington (against Montserrat)
- (Barbados) Ramón Griffith (against Dominican Republic)
- (Belize) Deshawon Nembhard (against Saint Vincent and the Grenadines)
- (Montserrat) Jeriel Dorsett (against Dominican Republic)
