= 2002–03 Montserrat Championship =

Football competition

Montserrat Championship
- Season: 2001
- Champions: Police
- Relegated: none
- Matches: 6
- Top goalscorer: Ottley Laborde

The 2002–03 season of the Montserrat Championship was the sixth recorded season of top flight association football competition in Montserrat, with records for any competition held between 1975 and 1995 not available, and the third iteration of the championship since the 1996–97 season was abandoned when the Soufrière Hills erupted causing widespread devastation to the island. For this season the format was changed to a single round robin series of matches from the home and away format utilised in previous seasons. The championship was won by the Police, following a 1–1 draw against Ideal in what was essentially a title decider in the final round of matches. This was their fifth title out of the six completed seasons to date.

== Participating teams ==
- Ideal Boys
- Montserrat Volcano Observatory Tremors
- Montserrat Secondary School
- Royal Montserrat Police Force

== League table ==
Only records for the top two places exist.

Team	Pld	W	D	L	GD	Pts
Royal Montserrat Police Force (C)	3	2	1	0	+15	7
Ideal	3	2	1	0	+11	7

== Top scorers ==
Year	Player	Team	Goals
2001	(Montserrat) Ottley Laborde	Royal Montserrat Police Force	8
