= 2016 Montserrat Championship =

Montserrat Championship
- Season: 2016
- Champions: Royal Montserrat Police Force
- CFU Club Championship: Royal Montserrat Police Force

The 2016 Montserrat Championship was the eighth recorded season of the competition. It was the first iteration of the league season in nearly 12 years. Most league games took place in front of dozens of people. The competition was won by Royal Montserrat Police Force.

== Final standings ==
Rank	Football club
Winners	Royal Montserrat Police Force
	Ideal SC
	Montserrat Secondary School
	MVO Tremors
	Seven Day Adventists Trendsetters
