= Montserratian football clubs in North American competitions =

This is a list of Montserratian football clubs in North American competitions. Montserratian clubs have participated in competitive international football competitions since at least 2004 when Ideal SC entered the 2004 CFU Club Championship.

No Montserratian team has won any CONCACAF competition, or won a single game in the competition, any Montserratian clubs have infrequently participated in CONCACAF tournaments due to logistical issues. The most recent appearance by a Montserratian football club in a CONCACAF club competition came in 2017 when Royal Montserrat Police Force participated in the 2017 Caribbean Club Championship.

== Who qualifies for CONCACAF competitions ==
Since 2018, the winner of the Montserrat Championship, the top tier of football on the island qualifies for the Caribbean Club Shield, a tertiary knockout tournament for developing Caribbean football nations. This competition is held in the spring. This also serves as a qualifying for the CONCACAF League, which played that fall. The CONCACAF League is the secondary association football competition for club football in North America. Should a team finish in the top six standings of the CONCACAF League, they qualify for the CONCACAF Champions League, which is played the following winter.

In order for a Montserratian team to reach the Champions League, they would need to win the Caribbean Club Shield and then earn a top six finish in the CONCACAF League.

== Results by competition ==
=== CFU Club Championship ===
Season	Club	Round	Opponent	Home	Away	Agg.	Ref.
2004	Ideal	First round	(Jamaica) Harbour View	1–15	0–15	1–30	
2017	Police Force	Group stage	(Dominican Republic) Cibao	0–16		0–16	
2017	Police Force	Group stage	(Haiti) Don Bosco	0–11		0–11	
2017	Police Force	Group stage	(Guadeloupe) USR	0–10		0–10	

== Appearances in CONCACAF competitions ==
As of December 23, 2019

Club	Total						CCL	CFU	CCS	CWC	First Appearance	Last Appearance
Club	Apps	Pld	W	D	L	Win%	CCL	CFU	CCS	CWC	First Appearance	Last Appearance
Police Force	1	3	0	0	3	.000	0	1	0	0	2017 CFU Club Championship	
Ideal	1	2	0	0	2	.000	0	1	0	0	2004 CFU Club Championship	
