= Football in Montserrat =

The sport of association football in the island of Montserrat is run by the Montserrat Football Association. The association administers the national football team, as well as the national football league. They are one of the few remaining FIFA members that have never had proven women's football. Financial reports for 2020 mention expenditures for women's football initiatives and domestic competition though, so it is possible that limited activity has been starting.

The sport is thought to have been introduced in the late 1960s or early 1970s, with the league forming in 1974, but actual historical evidence is limited. The eruption of the Soufrière Hills volcano interrupted league football in 1997, with the subsequent emigration of a significant proportion of the populace and establishment of an exclusion zone over much of the island removing any chance of consistent football. Since then the league has been sporadic and small in scale, with the national team primarily relying on players in their overseas diaspora. Clubs have participated twice in the Caribbean Club Championship, in 2004 and 2017, but never to date in the Caribbean Club Shield. Both Ideal SC in 2004 and Police FC in 2017 lost their matches heavily.

The national team would debut in 1991, in the Caribbean Cup, though they wouldn't form the modern FA until 1994, where they would join the Caribbean Football Union and later, in 1996, FIFA. Matches would remain relatively sporadic, with the eruptions preventing them from playing for 4 years and they quickly found themselves towards the bottom of the FIFA rankings. This led to their participation in The Other Final, a match organised to mirror the 2002 World Cup final but between the two lowest ranked countries: Montserrat and Bhutan. Losing 4–0, they would not win an official match until 2012, when they'd defeat the British Virgin Islands in 2012 Caribbean Championship qualification. Strong across Nations League qualification, they'd qualify for the 2019–20 CONCACAF Nations League B but would fail to reach the 2019 Gold Cup. As of October 2022 they would be ranked 179th in the world.

== League system ==
| Level | League(s)/Division(s) |
|---|---|
| 1 | Montserrat Championship; 5 clubs |

== National football stadium ==
| Stadium | Capacity | City |
|---|---|---|
| Blakes Estate Stadium | 1,000 | St John's |
