= Kelvin Ponde =

Montserratian footballer

Personal information
- Full name: Kelvin Ponde
- Date of birth: 26 June 1985 (age 41)
- Place of birth: Plymouth, Montserrat
- Height: 6 ft 1 in (1.85 m)
- Positions: Forward; midfielder; attacking midfielder

Team information
- Current team: Ideal SC

Senior career*
Years	Team	Apps	(Gls)
–2004	Bata Falcons		
2004–2015	Ideal SC		
2015–	Five Islands		

International career^{‡}
2004–	Montserrat	5	(0)
- * Club domestic league appearances and goals ‡ National team caps and goals as of 17 November 2018

Kelvin Ponde is a Montserratian footballer who plays for Ideal SC in the Montserrat Championship. He started his career with Bata Falcons who also participate in the Montserrat Championship.

== International career ==
Ponde made his senior debut for Montserrat on 29 February 2004 in a 13–0 away defeat to Bermuda.
