= 2004 Montserrat Championship =

Montserrat Championship
- Season: 2001
- Champions: Ideal

The 2004 season of the Montserrat Championship was the seventh recorded season of top flight association football competition in Montserrat, with records for any competition held between 1975 and 1995 not available, the third iteration of the championship since the 1996–97 season was abandoned when the Soufrière Hills erupted causing widespread devastation to the island, and, as of 2015, the last recorded season of competitive football on the island. The championship was won by Ideal, their first title to date.

== Final standings ==
Rank	Football club
Winners	Ideal SC
	Royal Montserrat Police Force
	Montserrat Secondary School
	MVO Tremors
	Seven Day Adventists Trendsetters
