= 2000 Montserrat Championship =

Montserrat Championship
- Season: 2000
- Champions: Royal Montserrat Police Force
- Relegated: none
- Matches: 9
- Goals: 77 (8.56 per match)

The 2000 season of the Montserrat Championship was the fifth recorded season of top flight association football competition in Montserrat, with records for any competition held between 1975 and 1995 not available, and the first iteration of the championship since the 1996–97 season was abandoned when the Soufrière Hills erupted causing widespread devastation to the island. The championship was won by the Royal Montserrat Police Force, their third title out of the four completed seasons to date. From the final league table it would appear that the last round of matches for the top two teams and the last two rounds of matches for the bottom two teams were not played once it was established that no results from these games could affect the final league standings.

== League table ==
Pos	Team	Pld	W	D	L	GF	GA	GD	Pts
1	Royal Montserrat Police Force (C)	7	6	0	1	29	9	+20	18
2	Ideal Boys	7	4	1	2	32	9	+23	13
3	Montserrat Volcano Observatory Tremors	6	2	1	3	14	18	−4	7
4	Seventh Day Adventists Trendsetters	6	0	0	6	2	41	−39	0

Updated to match(es) played on end of season. Source:
Rules for classification: 1) points; 2) goal difference; 3) number of goals scored.
(C) Champions
