= Peter Phyll =

Montserratian footballer

Personal information
- Full name: Peter Phyll
- Date of birth: 4 February 1974 (age 52)
- Place of birth: Plymouth, Montserrat
- Height: 6 ft 3 in (1.91 m)
- Position: Defender

Team information
- Current team: Ideal SC

Youth career
- Ideal SC

Senior career*
Years	Team	Apps	(Gls)
–	Ideal SC		
- * Club domestic league appearances and goals

Peter Phyll (born 4 February 1974) is a Montserratian international football player who plays as a defender for Ideal SC in the Montserrat Championship.

== Career ==
He has played for Ideal the whole of his career and who the Montserrat Championship with them in 2004.

== Personal life ==
He has a brother, Kurt Phyll, who also plays for Ideal SC.

== International career ==
Phyll has represented Montserrat on three occasions.
