= Shane Greenaway =

Montserratian footballer (born 1983)

Personal information
- Date of birth: 27 August 1983 (age 43)
- Place of birth: London, England
- Height: 1.73 m (5 ft 8 in)
- Position: Midfielder

Team information
- Current team: Bata Falcons

Senior career*
Years	Team	Apps	(Gls)
1999–2000	Bata Falcons		
2001–2002	Horton Athletic		

International career
2000–2002	Montserrat	2	(0)
- * Club domestic league appearances and goals

Shane Greenaway is a Montserratian international footballer who plays as a midfielder.

== Career ==
Greenaway played for Bata Falcons in the Montserrat Championship. He has also represented the Montserrat national football team.
