= Salem Oval =

Cricket ground in Montserrat

- Interactive map of Salem Oval

Ground information
- Location: Salem, Montserrat
- Country: West Indies
- Coordinates: 16°44′52″N 62°13′21″W
- Establishment: 2000

Team information
Leeward Island	(2003–2008)
Montserrat	(2000–present)
MVO Tremors FC	(2000–2001)
Ideal SC	(2000–2001)
- As of 7 October 2012; Source: Cricinfo

The Salem Oval is a cricket ground located in the village of Salem, Montserrat. The ground was constructed following the destruction of Montserrat's main cricket ground in Plymouth, which was destroyed in the Soufrière Hills eruption of 1997.

== History ==
The ground was completed by the year 2000, with the first match held at the ground seeing Montserrat play a minor match against Antigua and Barbuda. The following year, the touring South Africans played at the ground against the University of West Indies Vice-Chancellor's XI, with half the islands population reportedly attending. This match did not hold first-class status, and it was not until 2003 that first-class cricket returned to Montserrat (Note: Sturge Park previously held six first-class and five List A matches.) when the Leeward Islands played West Indies B in the 2002/03 Carib Beer Cup. The ground has held two more first-class matches for the Leeward Islands, one in the 2004/05 Carib Beer Cup against Trinidad and Tobago and another in the 2007/08 Carib Beer Cup against Barbados. Seven first-class centuries have been scored there, while five five wicket hauls have been taken. Montserrat continue to play minor matches there, with the ground serving as their main home ground.

Salem Oval was also home of association football clubs Volcano Observatory and Ideal from the Montserrat Championship for the 2000 and 2001 seasons.

== Records ==
=== First-class ===
- Highest team total: 579 all out by Trinidad and Tobago v Leeward Islands, 2004/05
- Lowest team total: 191 all out by West Indies B v Leeward Islands, 2002/03
- Highest individual innings: 265 by Daren Ganga for Trinidad and Tobago v Leeward Islands, 2004/05
- Best bowling in an innings: 6/153 by Omari Banks for Leeward Islands v Trinidad and Tobago, 2004/05

== See also ==
- List of cricket grounds in the West Indies
