= Kurt Joyce =

Montserratian footballer

Personal information
- Full name: Kurt Joyce
- Date of birth: 8 November 1980 (age 45)
- Place of birth: Salem, Montserrat
- Height: 6 ft 2 in (1.88 m)
- Position: Goalkeeper

Team information
- Current team: Ideal SC
- Number: 1

Senior career*
Years	Team	Apps	(Gls)
- Ideal SC

International career
- Montserrat (UTC)
- * Club domestic league appearances and goals
