= Education in Montserrat =

Education in Montserrat is compulsory for children between the ages of 5 and 14, and free up to the age of 17. The Government of Montserrat developed an Education in the Country Policy Plan for 1998–2002 in conjunction with the United Kingdom. Under this plan, the government is supporting initiatives in the areas of curriculum development, student assessment and evaluation, professional development for teachers, post-secondary education expansion, and educational infrastructure and information technology.

The educational system is similar to that of England. In 1990 all primary school-aged residents were enrolled in school.

== History ==
Methodists created two schools, one each in Plymouth and Cavalla Hill. The Sturges family founded the Olveston School.

Despite its small population of about 5,000 residents, Montserrat is home to three offshore medical schools.

== Schools ==
Government daycares include Lookout Daycare, St. John's Daycare, and Salem Daycare. Government nurseries include Brades Nursery, Lookout Nursery, and Salem Nursery. Aunt Madge Child Care, a private institution, has nursery and daycare services. Lookout Nursery opened in 2001, Lookout Daycare opened in 2002, and Salem Nursery opened in 2005. St. John's Nursery closed in 2001.

There are two government primary schools with Kindergarten and grades 1-6:

- Brades Primary School (Brades)
  - The Methodist Church built the school in 1966. Further additions and renovation were done by the Montserrat government. In 2009 the school was overpopulated; it had 151 students that year.
- Lookout Primary School (Lookout)
  - It was established after the 1997 Soufrière Hills volcanic eruption, beginning as a secondary institution in 1997. In 2001 it was converted into a primary institution. There are three buildings, with Building 1 at the highest-most point. In 2009 it had 174 students.

There are two private primary schools with Kindergarten and grades 1-6:

- St. Augustine Catholic Primary School (Brades)
- Lighthouse Primary School
- Samuel Academy (opened 2005)

There is also a Special Needs Unit primary school which opened in 2003.

The only secondary school (pre-16 years of age) on the island is the Montserrat Secondary School (MSS), a government-operated school in Salem. Montserrat Community College (MCC) is a community college (post-16 and tertiary) in Salem. MCC took over sixth-form college from MSS upon its opening in 2004.

The University of the West Indies maintains its Montserrat Open Campus. The University of Science, Arts and Technology in Olveston, a private tertiary institution, was established in 2003 and is accredited by Montserrat's Ministry of Education.

=== Pre-1997 ===
In the pre-1997 era, Montserrat had state, private, and church schools. In 1989 the island had two day care centres. Its 12 nursery schools had 460 students in 1988. Its 12 primary schools had 1,403 students in 1988.

- Kinsdale Primary School (KPS)
  - It served as a hurricane shelter.
- Plymouth Primary School
- Salem Primary School

Prior to 1928 residents had to go outside Montserrat to get secondary schooling. In 1928, the first secondary institution, Montserrat Boys Grammar School, a government boys-only school, opened. In 1932 a private girls-only secondary school opened. They merged into MSS in 1938.

In the pre-1997 era, Plymouth Junior Secondary School, Salem Junior Secondary School, and the MSS junior section had lower secondary education while MSS senior section had upper secondary education. They were branches of one secondary institution, and together had 1,043 students in 1988.

There was also a technical college, Montserrat Technical College (MTC), with 72 students in 1988.
