= Lookout, Montserrat =

Lookout Look Out
- Village
- Location of Lookout within Montserrat Lookout (the Caribbean)
- Coordinates: 16°47′43″N 62°11′8″W
- Country: United Kingdom
- Overseas territory: Montserrat
- Elevation: 560 ft (170 m)

Population (2018)
  - Total: 696
- Time zone: UTC-4 (Atlantic Standard Time)

Lookout (sometimes spelled as Look Out) is a village in the northern portion of the Caribbean island of Montserrat, a British Overseas Territory. The population was 696 as of 2018. Lookout is the home of several notable buildings including St. Patrick's Church and Blakes Estate Stadium, which is the largest stadium in Montserrat and has a higher capacity than the population of the entire town. The stadium is the home of the Montserrat national football team and several club teams in the Montserrat Championship including Police, Ideal, Tremors, and others.

== History ==
Lookout is the youngest settlement on Montserrat. It was founded in 1998 following the 1997 Soufrière Hills eruption. Many of Lookout's current residents evacuated from Plymouth, the former capital of the island, which was destroyed in the eruption.
