= Simon Peddie =

Footballer (born 1981)

Personal information
- Date of birth: 5 January 1982 (age 44)
- Height: 1.83 m (6 ft 0 in)
- Positions: Defender; midfielder

Senior career*
| Years | Team | Apps | (Gls) |
| ????–2006 | Leyton | | |
| 2006–2007 | Cheshunt | | |
| 2007–2008 | Woodbridge Town | | |
| 2008 | Boreham Wood | | |
| 2008–2009 | Redbridge | | |
| 2010–2016 | East Thurrock United | 93 | (8) |
| 2016–2017 | Tilbury | 21 | (1) |
| 2017–2018 | East Thurrock United | 8 | (0) |
| 2018–2022 | Hashtag United | 44 | (0) |
| 2022 | → Frenford (loan) | 5 | (1) |
| 2022–2023 | Frenford | 27 | (6) |
| 2022 | Tower Hamlets | 14 | (1) |

International career^{‡}
| 2014 | Montserrat | 2 | (0) |
- * Club domestic league appearances and goals as of 19:03, 14 January 2024 (UTC) ‡ National team caps and goals as of 11:28, 7 August 2015 (UTC)

Simon Peddie (born 5 January 1981) is a footballer who plays as a defender or midfielder. He represented the Montserrat national team in 2014.

== Club career ==
Peddie joined Cheshunt from Leyton in March 2006. He went on to play for Boreham Wood having signed from Woodbridge Town in February 2008 by George Borg.

He went on to make over 100 appearances for Redbridge before joining Isthmian League Division One North club, East Thurrock United on 23 October 2010.

== International career ==
Peddie has played twice for the Montserrat national team, with both appearances coming in qualifying for the 2014 Caribbean Cup. His début came on 30 May 2014 in the 1–0 win over U.S. Virgin Islands at home at Blakes Estate Stadium, Lookout, Montserrat. Peddie's second cap came in the 0–0 home draw with Bonaire on 3 June 2014.

== Style of play ==
Former Cheshunt manager Tom Loizou described Peddie as "a versatile player, capable of playing anywhere across the back four, or in midfield".
