= Dominic Richmond =

Montserratian footballer (born 2006)

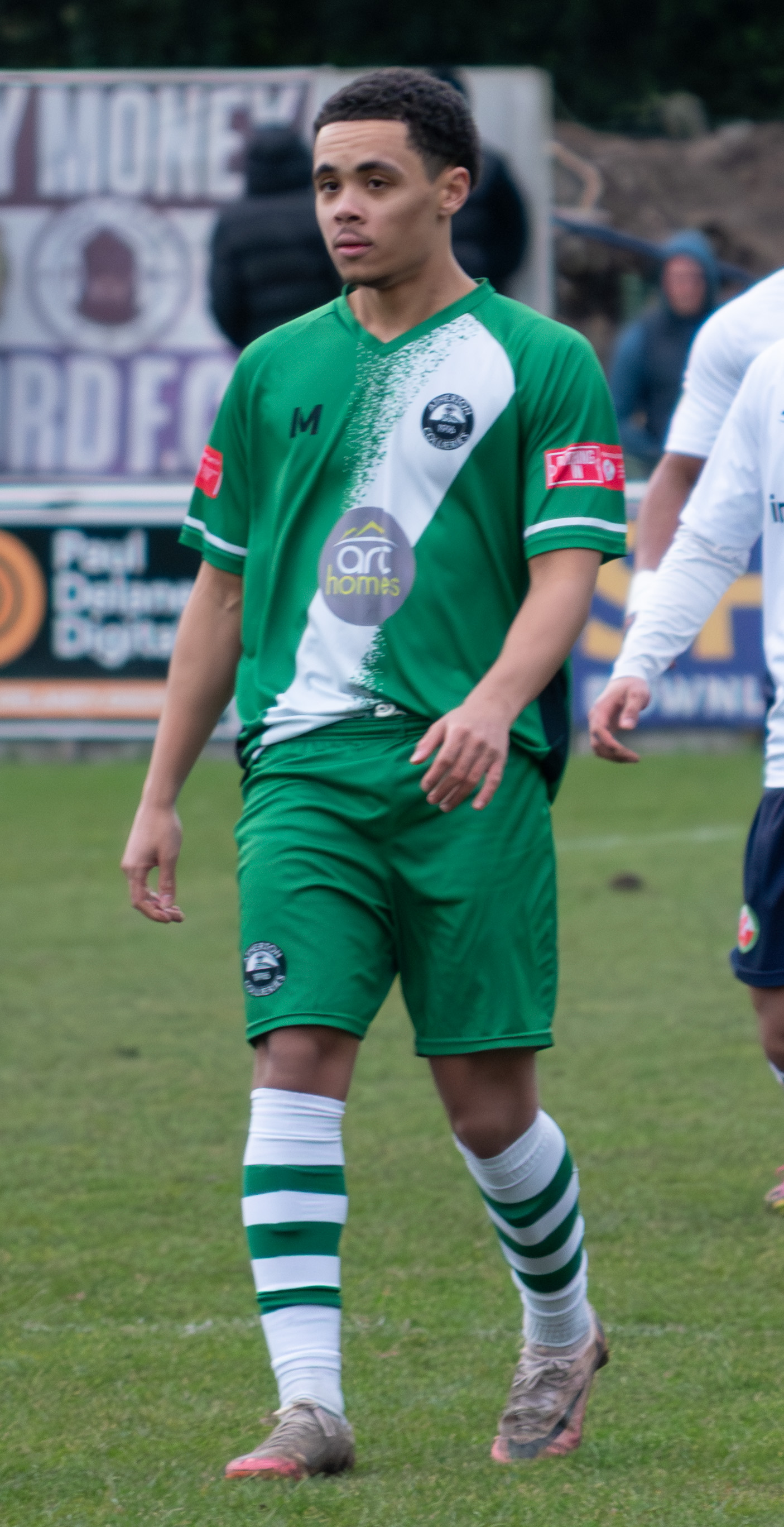
- Richmond playing for Atherton Collieries in 2026

Personal information
- Full name: Dominic Samuel Richmond
- Date of birth: 18 March 2006 (age 20)
- Place of birth: Preston, England
- Position: Forward

Team information
- Current team: Squires Gate

Youth career
- 2016–2024: Fleetwood Town

Senior career*
Years	Team	Apps	(Gls)
2024	Longridge Town	2	(0)
2025	Colne	3	(1)
2025	PN Marist	10	(7)
2025–2026	Atherton Collieries	28	(1)
2026–	Squires Gate	1	(1)

International career^{‡}
2023–	Montserrat	16	(1)
- * Club domestic league appearances and goals as of 18:47, 19 September 2026 (UTC) ‡ National team caps and goals as of 15:50, 13 November 2026 (UTC)

Dominic Samuel Richmond (born 18 March 2006) is a professional footballer who plays as a forward for Squires Gate. Born in England, he plays for the Montserrat national team.

== Career ==
=== Club ===
Richmond is from Preston. He joined the academy at Fleetwood Town as an under-11 in 2016. In 2022, he signed a two-year scholarship with the Cods. He was released at the end of the 2023-24 season.

Richmond played two games in the North West Counties Football League for Longridge Town in September 2024. After a brief stint with Colne, he moved to New Zealand in March to join PN Marist, scoring a brace on his debut.

After scoring 7 times in 10 games in New Zealand, Richmond joined Atherton Collieries on 6 September 2025.

=== International ===
Richmond was called up by Montserrat in March 2023, making his debut against Guyana on 29 March. On 20 November 2023, he scored his first international goal against Barbados.

== Career statistics ==
=== International ===
As of match played 11 June 2025

Appearances and goals by national team and year
National team	Year	Apps	Goals
Montserrat	2023	3	1
Montserrat	2024	7	0
Montserrat	2025	2	0
Total		12	1

=== International goals ===
Scores and results list Montserrat's goal tally first.

No.	Date	Venue	Opponent	Score	Result	Competition
1.	20 November 2023	Blakes Estate Stadium, Look Out, Montserrat	Barbados	4–1	4–2	2023–24 CONCACAF Nations League B
