= 1975 Montserrat Championship =

Montserrat Championship
- Season: 1975
- Champions: Bata Falcons

The 1975 season of the Montserrat Championship was the second season of top flight association football competition in Montserrat. Having won the cup final, known as the Barclays Knockout Trophy for sponsorship reasons, the previous season, Bata Falcons won the championship.
