= 1995–96 Montserrat Championship =

Montserrat Championship
- Season: 1995–96
- Champions: Police

The 1995–96 season of the Montserrat Championship was the third recorded season of top flight association football competition in Montserrat, with records for any competition held between 1975 and 1995 not available. Police won the championship, their second championship following their victory in the inaugural competition in 1974.
