= Albert Ajaiso =

French Guianan footballer (born 1986)

Personal information
- Date of birth: 14 November 1986 (age 39)
- Place of birth: French Guiana
- Position: Defender

Team information
- Current team: US Sainte-Marienne

Youth career
- Geldar

Senior career*
Years	Team	Apps	(Gls)
–2008	Lorient C		
2008–2013	FC Quimperlé		
2013–2014	US Montagnarde		
2014–2017	US Matoury		
2017–2019	US Sainte-Marienne		
2020–2021	AS Sainte-Suzanne		
2022–	US Sainte-Marienne		

International career^{‡}
2004–	French Guiana	29	(1)
- * Club domestic league appearances and goals ‡ National team caps and goals as of 21 June 2026

Albert Ajaiso (born 14 November 1986) is a French Guianan footballer who plays as a defender for US Sainte-Marienne.

== Career ==
Ajaiso started his career with French side Lorient C. In 2017, he signed for US Sainte-Marienne in the Réunionese top flight. Before the 2020 season, Ajaiso signed for Réunionese second tier club AS Sainte-Suzanne. Before the 2022 season, he signed for US Sainte-Marienne in Réunion.

== Career statistics ==
=== International ===
Scores and results list French Guiana's goal tally first, score column indicates score after each Ajaiso goal.

List of international goals scored by Albert Ajaiso
No.	Date	Venue	Opponent	Score	Result	Competition
1	21 November 2023	Stade Pierre-Aliker, Fort-de-France, Martinique	Bermuda	1–0	3–0	2023–24 CONCACAF Nations League B
