= Remy Coddington =

Bermudian footballer (born 2004)

Personal information
- Full name: Remy Taye Stephon Coddington
- Date of birth: 3 June 2004 (age 22)
- Place of birth: Pembroke, Bermuda
- Height: 1.79 m (5 ft 10 in)
- Position: Midfielder

Team information
- Current team: Bracknell Town

Youth career
- North Village Rams
- 2019–2020: AFC Bournemouth
- 2020–2023: West Ham United

Senior career*
Years	Team	Apps	(Gls)
2023	Swanage Town & Herston	2	(2)
2023	Poole Town	2	(0)
2024–	Bracknell Town	6	(2)
2024–	→ Sandhurst Town (dual registration)	5	(0)

International career^{‡}
2019	Bermuda U15	4	(3)
2021–	Bermuda	12	(2)
- * Club domestic league appearances and goals as of 10:30, 7 December 2024 (GMT) ‡ National team caps and goals as of 10:30, 7 December 2024 (GMT)

Remy Taye Stephon Coddington (born 3 June 2004) is a Bermudian international footballer who plays for Bracknell Town, as a midfielder.

== Club career ==
Coddington began his career with North Village Rams in his native Bermuda. In March 2019, Coddington signed for AFC Bournemouth. In July 2020, Coddington signed scholarship forms with West Ham United.

Coddington began the 2023–24 season with Dorset Premier League side Swanage Town & Herston. In September 2023, Remy signed for Southern Premier South side Poole Town.

In August 2024, Coddington signed for Bracknell Town. Whilst at Bracknell, Coddington also played for sister club Sandhurst Town.

== International career ==
Coddington represented Bermuda's under-15 side during the 2019 CONCACAF Boys' Under-15 Championship, scoring three goals in four appearances.

On 5 March 2021, Coddington made his debut for Bermuda, scoring in a 3–0 victory against the Bahamas.

=== International goals ===
Scores and results list Bermuda's goal tally first.

#	Date	Venue	Opponent	Score	Result	Competition
1	5 March 2021	IMG Academy, Bradenton, United States	Bahamas	3–0	3–0	Friendly
2	12 September 2023	Arnos Vale Stadium, Arnos Vale, Saint Vincent and the Grenadines	Saint Vincent and the Grenadines	2–4	3–4	2023–24 CONCACAF Nations League B group C

== Personal life ==
Coddington's father, PJ, played domestically for Devonshire Cougars and North Village Rams.
