= Gerald Díaz =

Puerto Rican footballer (born 1999)

Personal information
- Full name: Gerald Jadiel Díaz Agrait
- Date of birth: 23 March 1999 (age 27)
- Place of birth: Caguas, Puerto Rico
- Height: 5 ft 9 in (1.75 m)
- Position: Midfielder

Team information
- Current team: Miami FC
- Number: 16

Youth career
- –2017: Vall de Uxó
- 2017: Levante

College career
Years	Team	Apps	(Gls)
2018	Marshalltown Tigers	17	(7)

Senior career*
Years	Team	Apps	(Gls)
2017	Vall de Uxó	1	(0)
2017	Atlético Levante	0	(0)
2019–2020	Bayamón FC		(10)
2020–2021	Vilamarxant	11	(1)
2021–2022	Bayamón FC		
2022–2023	Buñol	26	(5)
2023–2025	Academia Quintana		
2025–	Miami FC	34	(1)

International career^{‡}
2016–2018	Puerto Rico U20	8	(1)
2019	Puerto Rico U23	3	(1)
2017–	Puerto Rico	47	(13)
- * Club domestic league appearances and goals as of 13:33, 8 November 2026 (UTC) ‡ National team caps and goals as of 23:13, 16 November 2026 (UTC)

Gerald Jadiel Díaz Agrait (born 23 March 1999) is a Puerto Rican professional football player who plays as a midfielder for USL Championship club Miami FC and the Puerto Rico national team.

== Club career ==
Díaz began playing in Puerto Rico at local club Caguas Bairoa. He later spent time in Spain in UD Vall de Uxó and Levante UD. He played on his first college year at Marshalltown Community College before returning to Puerto Rico in 2019 to play for Universidad del Sagrado Corazón.

== International career ==
Gerald was called up in 2016, for the Puerto Rico under-20 national team, for the first round of World Cup qualifiers.

He made his debut with the senior Puerto Rico national team in July 2017, in a friendly match against Indonesia.

In 2018 he was called up once again for the U20 under head coach Amado Guevara for the 2018 CONCACAF U-20 Championship where he scored a goal. In July 2019, he played for the Puerto Rico national under-23 football team for the 2020 Olympic Games qualification where he scored one goal.

He scored his first international goal on October 15, 2019 on a 2-3 victory over Anguilla. On June 18, 2023 he scored the winning penalty in a shoot-out against Suriname in the 2023 CONCACAF Gold Cup qualification match, taking Puerto Rico to their highest achievement in the competition's history to date.

== Career statistics ==
=== Club ===
As of 1 June 2021.

Appearances and goals by club, season and competition
Club	Season	League			Cup		Other		Total	
Club	Season	Division	Apps	Goals	Apps	Goals	Apps	Goals	Apps	Goals
Vall de Uxó	2017–18	Preferente Valenciana	1	0	0	0	0	0	1	0
Atlético Levante	2017–18	Tercera División	0	0	0	0	0	0	0	0
Vilamarxant	2020–21	Tercera División	11	1	0	0	0	0	11	1
Career total			12	1	0	0	0	0	12	1

=== International ===
As of match played 16 November 2026

Appearances and goals by national team and year
National team	Year	Apps	Goals
Puerto Rico	2017	1	0
Puerto Rico	2018	1	0
Puerto Rico	2019	6	1
Puerto Rico	2020	0	0
Puerto Rico	2021	4	1
Puerto Rico	2022	2	1
Puerto Rico	2023	9	7
Puerto Rico	2024	10	2
Puerto Rico	2025	6	0
Puerto Rico	2026	8	1
Total		47	13

Scores and results list Puerto Rico's goal tally first.

List of international goals scored by Gerald Díaz
No.	Date	Venue	Opponent	Score	Result	Competition
1.	15 October 2019	Raymond E. Guishard Technical Centre, The Valley, Anguilla	Anguilla	3–0	3–2	2019–20 CONCACAF Nations League C
2.	2 June 2021	Mayagüez Athletics Stadium, Mayagüez, Puerto Rico	Bahamas	1–0	7–0	2022 FIFA World Cup qualification
3.	12 June 2022	Mayagüez Athletics Stadium, Mayagüez, Puerto Rico	British Virgin Islands	3–0	6–0	2022–23 CONCACAF Nations League C
4.	26 March 2023	Mayagüez Athletics Stadium, Mayagüez, Puerto Rico	Cayman Islands	2–0	5–1	2022–23 CONCACAF Nations League C
5.	9 September 2023	Thomas Robinson Stadium, Nassau, Bahamas	Bahamas	1–1	6–1	2023–24 CONCACAF Nations League B
6.	12 September 2023	Mayagüez Athletics Stadium, Mayagüez, Puerto Rico	Antigua and Barbuda	1–0	5–0	2023–24 CONCACAF Nations League B
7.	12 September 2023	Mayagüez Athletics Stadium, Mayagüez, Puerto Rico	Antigua and Barbuda	4–0	5–0	2023–24 CONCACAF Nations League B
8.	12 September 2023	Mayagüez Athletics Stadium, Mayagüez, Puerto Rico	Antigua and Barbuda	5–0	5–0	2023–24 CONCACAF Nations League B
9.	17 October 2023	SKNFA Technical Center, Basseterre, Saint Kitts and Nevis	Guyana	1–0	1–3	2023–24 CONCACAF Nations League B
10.	21 November 2023	Juan Ramón Loubriel Stadium, Bayamón, Puerto Rico	Bahamas	5–0	6–1	2023–24 CONCACAF Nations League B
11.	6 September 2024	Mayagüez Athletics Stadium, Mayagüez, Puerto Rico	Haiti	1–0	1–4	2024–25 CONCACAF Nations League B
12.	14 October 2024	Trinidad Stadium, Oranjestad, Aruba	Sint Maarten	1–0	2–1	2024–25 CONCACAF Nations League B
13.	13 November 2026	Leonora National Track and Field Centre, Georgetown, Guyana	Dominica	3–1	4–2	2026–27 CONCACAF Nations League B
