= Arnold Abelinti =

French Guianan footballer (born 1991)

Personal information
- Date of birth: 9 September 1991 (age 35)
- Place of birth: Kourou, French Guiana
- Height: 1.83 m (6 ft 0 in)
- Position: Forward

Team information
- Current team: Saran

Senior career*
Years	Team	Apps	(Gls)
2009–2011	USM Olivet		
2011–2013	Orléans B	30	(16)
2013–2014	Saint-Pryvé Saint-Hilaire	24	(15)
2014–2015	Limoges	20	(5)
2015–2016	Saint-Pryvé Saint-Hilaire	24	(14)
2016–2017	JA Drancy	26	(10)
2017–2018	Limoges	26	(6)
2018–2019	Yzeure	26	(4)
2019–2021	Romorantin	18	(2)
2021–2024	Olympique Alès	59	(13)
2024–	Saran		

International career^{‡}
2016–	French Guiana	27	(9)
- * Club domestic league appearances and goals as of 18 May 2024 ‡ National team caps and goals as of 21 June 2026

Arnold Abelinti (born 9 September 1991) is a French Guianan professional footballer who plays as a forward for French amateur side Saran and the French Guiana national team.

== Career ==
Starting his career at Loiret-based side USM Olivet, Abelinti was spotted by then-Championnat National side US Orléans, and spent two seasons with the club's 'B' team, scoring an impressive 16 goals from 30 appearances.

He left in 2013, feeling betrayed by the Orléans club and moved to CFA 2 side Saint-Pryvé Saint-Hilaire. He had two spells there, scoring a total of 29 goals in 48 games, with a year at Limoges FC between them.

He returned to the CFA in 2016, signing with JA Drancy in July.

On 19 June 2019, Abelinti joined SO Romorantin.

== International career ==
Abelinti made his debut in June 2016, scoring the second of a 3–0 win against Bermuda. In his second game, against St. Kitts & Nevis, he scored the game's only goal.

== Career statistics ==
=== International ===
As of match played 10 September 2024.

National team	Year	Apps	Goals
French Guiana	2016	3	2
French Guiana	2017	5	1
French Guiana	2018	2	0
French Guiana	2019	1	0
French Guiana	2020	0	0
French Guiana	2021	1	1
French Guiana	2022	4	1
French Guiana	2023	8	4
French Guiana	2024	3	0
Total		27	9

==== International goals ====
Scores and results list French Guiana's goal tally first.

No.	Date	Venue	Opponent	Score	Result	Competition
1.	19 June 2016	Stade Municipal Dr. Edmard Lama, Remire-Montjoly, French Guiana	Bermuda	2–0	3–0	2017 Caribbean Cup qualification
2.	8 October 2016	Stade Municipal Dr. Edmard Lama, Remire-Montjoly, French Guiana	Saint Kitts and Nevis	1–0	1–0	2017 Caribbean Cup qualification
3.	17 June 2017	Stade Municipal Dr. Edmard Lama, Remire-Montjoly, French Guiana	Barbados	3–0	3–0	Friendly
4.	6 July 2021	DRV PNK Stadium, Fort Lauderdale, United States	Trinidad and Tobago	1–1	1–1	2021 CONCACAF Gold Cup qualification
5.	5 June 2022	Félix Sánchez Olympic Stadium, Santo Domingo, Dominican Republic	Dominican Republic	3–2	3–2	2022–23 CONCACAF Nations League B
6.	17 June 2023	DRV PNK Stadium, Fort Lauderdale, United States	Sint Maarten	1–0	4–1	2023 CONCACAF Gold Cup qualification
7.	17 June 2023	DRV PNK Stadium, Fort Lauderdale, United States	Sint Maarten	3–1	4–1	2023 CONCACAF Gold Cup qualification
8.	20 June 2023	DRV PNK Stadium	Saint Kitts and Nevis	1–1	1–1 (2–4 p)	2023 CONCACAF Gold Cup qualification
9.	13 October 2023	Arnos Vale Stadium, Kingstown, Saint Vincent and the Grenadines	Saint Vincent and the Grenadines	2–0	4–1	2023–24 CONCACAF Nations League B
