= 2023 CONCACAF Gold Cup qualification =

2023 CONCACAF Gold Cup Prelims
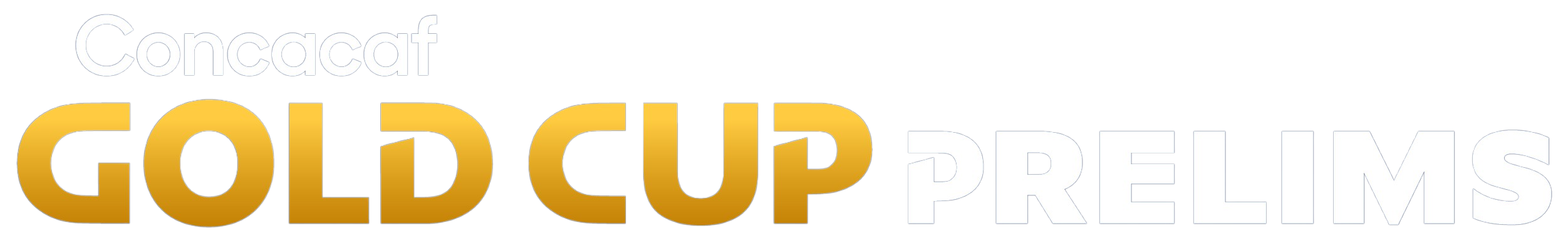

Tournament details
- Host country: United States
- Dates: 16–20 June
- Teams: 12
- Venue: 1 (in 1 host city)

Tournament statistics
- Matches played: 9
- Goals scored: 24 (2.67 per match)
- Top scorer(s): (French Guiana) Arnold Abelinti (3 goals)

The 2023 CONCACAF Gold Cup qualification tournament determined the final three teams to qualify for the 2023 CONCACAF Gold Cup.

The matches took place from 16 to 20 June 2023 at DRV PNK Stadium, Fort Lauderdale, Florida, United States.

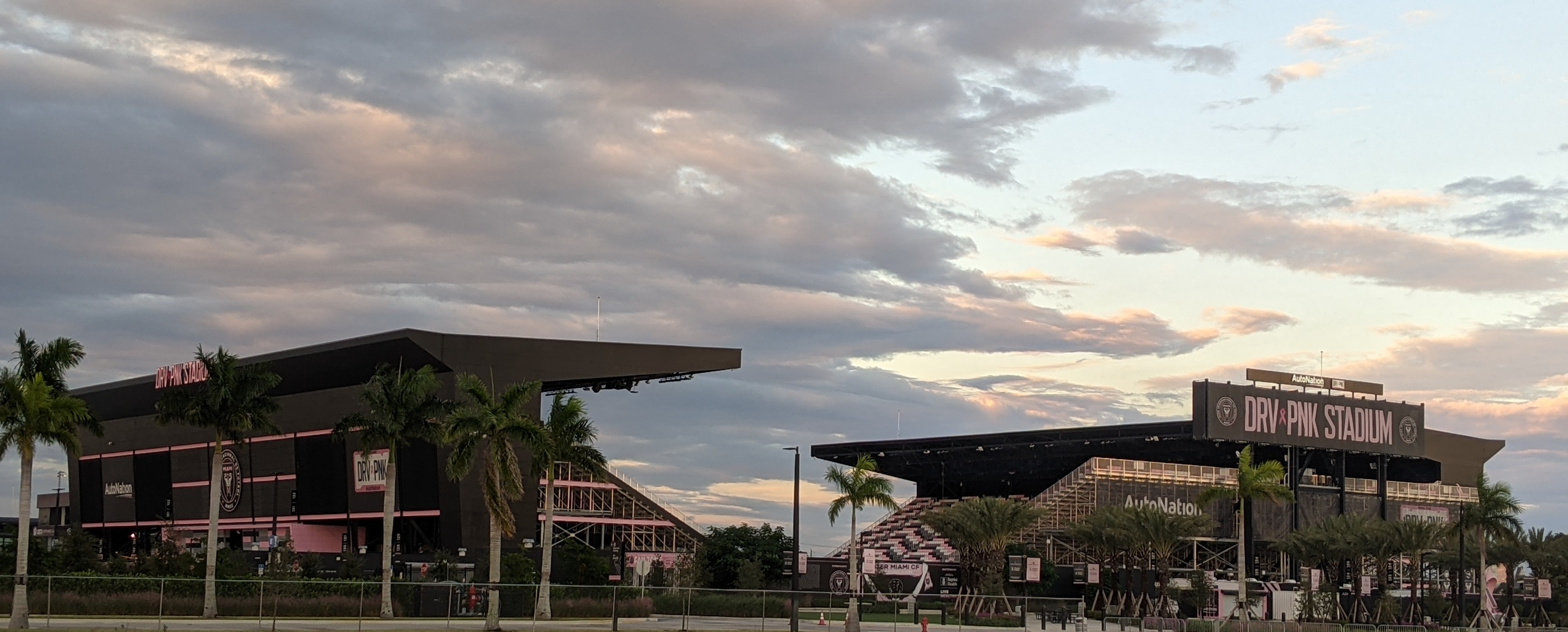
DRV PNK Stadium in Fort Lauderdale hosted the matches

== Teams ==
Twelve teams participated in the 2023 CONCACAF Gold Cup qualifiers based on the results of the 2022–23 CONCACAF Nations League. These teams were the four group third-placed teams of 2022–23 CONCACAF Nations League A, the four second-place finishers from League B and the four group winners from League C.

Trinidad and Tobago were originally set to participate as Nations League B Group C runners-up, but were automatically qualified after Nicaragua were disqualified. Trinidad and Tobago were replaced in the preliminary round by Antigua and Barbuda, the team with the best performance in League B who had not qualified.

League A
Group	Third place
A	Suriname
B	Martinique
C	Curaçao
D	Grenada

League B
Group	Runners-up
A	Guadeloupe
B	Guyana
A (3rd)	Antigua and Barbuda
D	French Guiana

League C
Group	Winners
A	Sint Maarten
B	Saint Kitts and Nevis
C	Saint Lucia
D	Puerto Rico

== Draw ==
The preliminary round draw was held on 14 April 2023, 12:00 PDT (UTC−7), at SoFi Stadium in Inglewood, California, United States. For round one, the top six teams based on the CONCACAF Rankings of March 2023 were pre-seeded into matches 1 to 6 (highest ranked in match 1, second-highest ranked in match 2, etc.), while the remaining six teams were drawn from a single pot and assigned to matches in sequential order. The fixtures for round two were predetermined (with pairings featuring the winners of round one matches 1 v 6, 2 v 5 and 3 v 4).

Pre-seeded
Team	Pts	Rank
~~Trinidad and Tobago (M1)~~; Antigua and Barbuda	1,254	11
Martinique (M2)	1,246	12
Curaçao (M3)	1,171	14
French Guiana (M4)	1,086	15
Suriname (M5)	1,079	16
Guyana (M6)	994	18

Pot 1
Team	Pts	Rank
Guadeloupe	966	19
Saint Kitts and Nevis	923	21
Saint Lucia	795	24
Grenada	791	25
Puerto Rico	790	26
Sint Maarten	413	37

== Match officials ==
On 15 June 2023, CONCACAF announced the referees, assistant referees and video assistant referees (VAR) appointed for the tournament.

Referees

- (Costa Rica) Keylor Herrera
- (Dominican Republic) Randy Encarnación
- (Grenada) Reon Radix
- (Guatemala) Bryan López
- (Jamaica) Oshane Nation
- (Mexico) Adonai Escobedo
- (Mexico) Fernando Guerrero
- (United States) Joseph Dickerson
- (United States) Rubiel Vazquez

Assistant referees

- (Canada) Micheal Barwegen
- (Dominican Republic) Raymundo Feliz
- (Jamaica) Jassett Kerr-Wilson
- (Mexico) Enrique Bustos
- (Mexico) Jorge Sánchez
- (Mexico) Christian Espinoza
- (Mexico) Karen Díaz
- (Nicaragua) Keytzel Corrales
- (Suriname) Zachari Zeegelaar
- (United States) Kyle Atkins
- (United States) Kathryn Nesbitt
- (United States) Corey Parker

Video assistant referees

- (Honduras) Melissa Borjas Pastrana
- (Mexico) Erick Miranda
- (Mexico) Jorge Pérez
- (Mexico) Enrique Santander
- (United States) Edvin Jurisevic
- (United States) Chris Penso

== Bracket ==
The first round matches took place from 16–17 June, while the second round matches took place on 20 June 2023.

First round
16 June – Fort Lauderdale
Antigua and Barbuda	0
Guadeloupe	5
17 June – Fort Lauderdale
Guyana (p)	1 (5)
Grenada	1 (3)
16 June – Fort Lauderdale
Martinique	3
Saint Lucia	1
17 June – Fort Lauderdale
Suriname	0 (3)
Puerto Rico (p)	0 (4)
16 June – Fort Lauderdale
Curaçao	1 (2)
Saint Kitts and Nevis (p)	1 (3)
17 June – Fort Lauderdale
French Guiana	4
Sint Maarten	1

Second round
20 June – Fort Lauderdale
Guadeloupe	2
Guyana	0
20 June – Fort Lauderdale
Martinique	2
Puerto Rico	0
20 June – Fort Lauderdale
Saint Kitts and Nevis (p)	1 (4)
French Guiana	1 (2)

All match times listed are local, EDT (UTC−4).

== First round ==
=== Summary ===
Team 1	Score	Team 2
Antigua and Barbuda	0–5	Guadeloupe
Martinique	3–1	Saint Lucia
Curaçao	1–1 (2–3 p)	Saint Kitts and Nevis
French Guiana	4–1	Sint Maarten
Suriname	0–0 (3–4 p)	Puerto Rico
Guyana	1–1 (5–3 p)	Grenada

=== Matches ===
16 June 2023
16:30

Antigua and Barbuda	0–5	Guadeloupe
	Report	Solvet 28'; Tell 45+4'; Davidas 66'; Archimède 70'; Phaëton 90+3'

DRV PNK Stadium, Fort Lauderdale
Referee: Fernando Guerrero (Mexico)

16 June 2023
19:00

Martinique	3–1	Saint Lucia
Fabien 18'; Labeau 74'; Burner 85'	Report	Hackett-Fairchild 40'

DRV PNK Stadium, Fort Lauderdale
Referee: Reon Radix (Grenada)

16 June 2023
21:00

Curaçao	1–1	Saint Kitts and Nevis
Locadia 22'	Report	Terrell 83'
Penalties
Felida (penalty missed); J. Bacuna (penalty scored); Janga (penalty scored); Anita (penalty missed); L. Bacuna (penalty missed)	2–3	(penalty missed) Sawyers; (penalty scored) Lewis; (penalty scored) Bertie; (penalty scored) Terrell

DRV PNK Stadium, Fort Lauderdale
Referee: Bryan López (Guatemala)

17 June 2023
16:30 (Note: The French Guiana vs Sint Maarten match was stopped during the half-time and resumed one hour and a half later due to adverse weather conditions. Consequently, the next two matches Suriname vs Puerto and Guyana vs Grenada, originally scheduled at 19:00 and 21:00 EDT (UTC−4), were delayed until 20:20 and 22:30 EDT, respectively.)

French Guiana	4–1	Sint Maarten
Abelinti 28' (pen.), 49'; Lo. Baal 44'; Némouthé 75'	Report	Amatkarijo 40'

DRV PNK Stadium, Fort Lauderdale
Referee: Randy Eancarnación (Dominican Republic)

17 June 2023
20:20

Suriname	0–0	Puerto Rico
	Report
Penalties
Chery (penalty scored); Jozefzoon (penalty scored); Pinas (penalty missed); Te Vrede (penalty missed); Abena (penalty scored)	3–4	(penalty scored) R. Rivera; (penalty missed) Servania; (penalty scored) Antonetti; (penalty scored) Ydrach; (penalty scored) G. Díaz

DRV PNK Stadium, Fort Lauderdale
Referee: Joe Dickerson (United States)

17 June 2023
22:30

Guyana	1–1	Grenada
Glasgow 22'	Report	Mitchell 60'
Penalties
Bonds (penalty scored); Glasgow (penalty scored); Duke-McKenna (penalty scored); Benjamin (penalty scored); Wilson (penalty scored)	5–3	(penalty scored) Reg. Charles-Cook; (penalty scored) Hippolyte; (penalty scored) Mitchell; (penalty missed) Berkeley-Agyepong

DRV PNK Stadium, Fort Lauderdale
Referee: Keylor Herrera (Costa Rica)

== Second round ==
=== Summary ===
Team 1	Score	Team 2
Guadeloupe	2–0	Guyana
Martinique	2–0	Puerto Rico
Saint Kitts and Nevis	1–1 (4–2 p)	French Guiana

=== Matches ===
20 June 2023
16:30

Guadeloupe	2–0	Guyana
Gordon 18' (o.g.); Gravillon 57'	Report

DRV PNK Stadium, Fort Lauderdale
Referee: Oshane Nation (Jamaica)

Guadeloupe advanced to Group D.

20 June 2023
20:00

Martinique	2–0	Puerto Rico
Labeau 52'; Fortuné 90+5'	Report

DRV PNK Stadium, Fort Lauderdale
Referee: Rubiel Vazquez (United States)

Martinique advanced to Group C.

20 June 2023
22:10

Saint Kitts and Nevis	1–1	French Guiana
T. Williams 41'	Report	Abelinti 54' (pen.)
Penalties
Freeman (penalty scored); Sawyers (penalty scored); Bertie (penalty scored); Lewis (penalty scored)	4–2	(penalty scored) Vancaeyezeele; (penalty missed) Baal; (penalty scored) Issorat; (penalty missed) Marmot

DRV PNK Stadium, Fort Lauderdale
Referee: Adonai Escobedo (Mexico)

Saint Kitts and Nevis advanced to Group A.

== Qualified teams ==
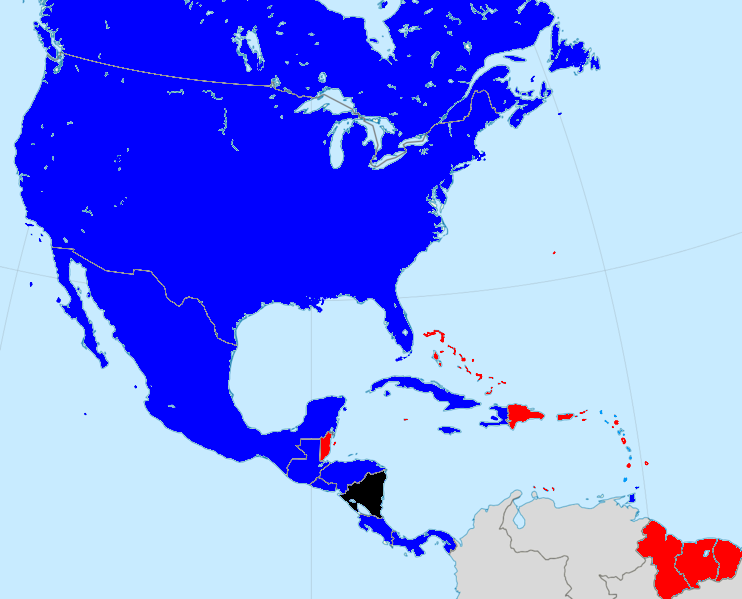
Team qualified for CONCACAF Gold Cup Team can qualify Team failed to qualify Team disqualified

Team	Qualified as	Qualified on	Previous appearances in CONCACAF Gold Cup^{1} only Gold Cup era (since 1991)
Qatar	Invitees	2 September 2020	1 (2021)
Panama	CNL League A Group B 1st place	12 June 2022	10 (1993, 2005, 2007, 2009, 2011, 2013, 2015, 2017, 2019, 2021)
Jamaica	CNL League A Group A 2nd place	14 June 2022	12 (1991, 1993, 1998, 2000, 2003, 2005, 2009, 2011, 2015, 2017, 2019, 2021)
El Salvador	CNL League A Group D 2nd place	14 June 2022	12 (1996, 1998, 2002, 2003, 2007, 2009, 2011, 2013, 2015, 2017, 2019, 2021)
Mexico	CNL League A Group A 1st place	23 March 2023	16 (1991, **1993**, **1996**, **1998**, 2000, 2002, **2003**, 2005, 2007, **2009**, **2011**, 2013, **2015**, 2017, **2019**, 2021)
United States	CNL League A Group D 1st place	24 March 2023	16 (**1991**, 1993, 1996, 1998, 2000, **2002**, 2003, **2005**, **2007**, 2009, 2011, **2013**, 2015, **2017**, 2019, **2021**)
Haiti	CNL League B Group B 1st place	25 March 2023	8 (2000, 2002, 2007, 2009, 2013, 2015, 2019, 2021)
Costa Rica	CNL League A Group B 2nd place	25 March 2023	15 (1991, 1993, 1998, 2000, 2002, 2003, 2005, 2007, 2009, 2011, 2013, 2015, 2017, 2019, 2021)
Canada	CNL League A Group C 1st place	25 March 2023	15 (1991, 1993, 1996, **2000**, 2002, 2003, 2005, 2007, 2009, 2011, 2013, 2015, 2017, 2019, 2021)
Honduras	CNL League A Group C 2nd place	25 March 2023	15 (1991, 1993, 1996, 1998, 2000, 2003, 2005, 2007, 2009, 2011, 2013, 2015, 2017, 2019, 2021)
Cuba	CNL League B Group A 1st place	26 March 2023	9 (1998, 2002, 2003, 2005, 2007, 2011, 2013, 2015, 2019)
Guatemala	CNL League B Group D 1st place	27 March 2023	11 (1991, 1996, 1998, 2000, 2002, 2003, 2005, 2007, 2011, 2015, 2021)
Trinidad and Tobago	CNL League B Group C 2nd place	12 June 2023	11 (1991, 1996, 1998, 2000, 2002, 2005, 2007, 2013, 2015, 2019, 2021)
Guadeloupe	Gold Cup Prelims Winner Match 7	20 June 2023	4 (2007, 2009, 2011, 2021)
Martinique	Gold Cup Prelims Winner Match 8	20 June 2023	7 (1993, 2002, 2003, 2013, 2017, 2019, 2021)
Saint Kitts and Nevis	Gold Cup Prelims Winner Match 9	20 June 2023	0 (debut)

^{1} Bold indicates champions for that year. Italic indicates hosts for that year.

== Goalscorers ==
There were 24 goals scored in 9 matches, for an average of 2.67 goals per match.

3 goals

- (French Guiana) Arnold Abelinti

2 goals

- (Martinique) Brighton Labeau

1 goal

- (Curaçao) Jürgen Locadia
- (French Guiana) Loïc Baal
- (French Guiana) Thomas Némouthé
- (Grenada) Kairo Mitchell
- (Guadeloupe) Luther Archimède
- (Guadeloupe) Steven Davidas
- (Guadeloupe) Andreaw Gravillon
- (Guadeloupe) Matthias Phaëton
- (Guadeloupe) Steve Solvet
- (Guadeloupe) Jordan Tell
- (Guyana) Omari Glasgow
- (Martinique) Patrick Burner
- (Martinique) Karl Fabien
- (Martinique) Kévin Fortuné
- (Saint Kitts and Nevis) Tyquan Terrell
- (Saint Kitts and Nevis) Tiquanny Williams
- (Saint Lucia) Reeco Hackett-Fairchild
- (Sint Maarten) Chovanie Amatkarijo

1 own goal

- (Guyana) Liam Gordon (against Guadeloupe)
