= Sturge Park =

Cricket ground in Montserrat

- Bartfield
- Interactive map of Sturge Park

Ground information
- Location: Plymouth, Montserrat
- Country: West Indies
- Coordinates: 16°42′52″N 62°13′30″W
- Establishment: c. 1925
- Demolished: 1997

Team information
Leeward Islands	(1966/67–1993/94)
Montserrat	(1925/26–1997)
- As of 8 October 2012; Source: Cricket Archive

Sturge Park was a cricket ground located on five acres of land adjacent to Plymouth, Montserrat. The ground, used by the Montserrat cricket team and infrequently by the Leeward Islands cricket team, was destroyed in the Soufrière Hills volcanic eruption of 1997. A replacement ground, the Salem Oval, was opened in 2000 on the north of the island.

== History ==
Cricket was first recorded as being played on what would become Sturge Park in October 1925, when St Kitts played Antigua in the 1925/26 Hesketh Bell Shield. Montserrat first played there in the same competition against Dominica, before the ground held the final of the tournament between Montserrat and Antigua, with Montserrat winning. The ground was not officially given for recreational use until 1936, when The Montserrat Company, owned by the Sturge family, donated the ground to the Government of Montserrat. The ground was named in honour of Joseph Sturge and his son. In keeping with his keeping Quaker values, alcohol was not permitted to be sold at the ground, though this rule was later relaxed. The next recorded match to be played there wasn't until 1967, when first-class cricket was played there for the first time with the Leeward Islands playing the Windward Islands. This was also the first time first-class cricket had been played on Montserrat. Montserrat continued to use the ground throughout the 1970s, while the next first-class match to be played there came in 1976 when the Leeward Islands played the touring Indians.

The following year a Combined Leeward and Windward Islands team played a first-class match against Guyana in the 1976/77 Shell Shield. In 1978, the ground held its first List A match when the Leeward Islands played Trinidad and Tobago in the 1977/78 Geddes Grant/Harrison Line Trophy. Throughout the 1970s, the ground was continuously used by Montserrat in its minor matches against regional neighbours. A second List A match was played there in 1980, between the Leeward Islands and Trinidad and Tobago in the 1979/80 Geddes Grant/Harrison Line Trophy, while the following year a further first-class match was played there when the Leeward Islands played a touring England XI. The next first-class fixture there came two years later, when the Leeward Islands played Jamaica in the 1982/83 Shell Shield. Two further List A matches were played there in the 1980s, the first seeing the Leeward Islands play Guyana in the 1984/85 Geddes Grant/Harrison Line Trophy, while the second saw them play the Windward Islands in the 1987/88 competition. Again in use by Montserrat throughout the 1980s, first-class cricket would not return there until 1994, when the Leeward Islands played Trinidad and Tobago in the 1993/94 Red Stripe Cup. The previous year, it had held a List A match between the Leeward Islands and Barbados in the 1992/93 Geddes Grant Shield. Unknowingly at the time, these would be the last major matches to be played there.

Beginning in 1995, the Soufrière Hills volcano on the island began to erupt, causing great damage to large parts of the island. Cricket continued to be played at Sturge Park until 1997, with the last fixture seeing Montserrat play a minor match against Antigua and Barbuda in May. In June 1997, a major eruption of the volcano destroyed Plymouth and along with it Sturge Park, burying the ground under layers of ash. A replacement ground, the Salem Oval, was opened in 2000 on the north of the island.

== Records ==
=== First-class ===
- Highest team total: 422 by Leeward Islands v Jamaica, 1982/83
- Lowest team total: 99 by Trinidad and Tobago v Leeward Islands, 1993/94
- Highest individual innings: 156 by Richie Richardson for Leeward Islands v Jamaica, 1982/83
- Best bowling in an innings: 6/65 by Andy Roberts for Leeward Islands, as above

=== List A ===
- Highest team total: 188/5 (49.2 overs) by Leeward Islands v Trinidad and Tobago, 1979/80
- Lowest team total: 117/9 (50 overs) by Windward Islands v Leeward Islands, 1987/88
- Highest individual innings: 76 by Keith D'Heurieux for Trinidad and Tobago v Leeward Islands, 1979/80
- Best bowling in an innings: 4/21 by Winston Benjamin for Leeward Islands v Barbados, 1992/93

== See also ==
- List of cricket grounds in the West Indies
