= Thomas Némouthé =

Footballer (born 2001)

Personal information
- Full name: Thomas Christian Némouthé
- Date of birth: 16 January 2001 (age 25)
- Place of birth: Le Blanc-Mesnil, France
- Height: 1.79 m (5 ft 10 in)
- Position: Midfielder

Team information
- Current team: FC 93
- Number: 26

Youth career
- 2018–2019: Drancy

Senior career*
Years	Team	Apps	(Gls)
2019–2021	Paris FC II	10	(0)
2021	Paris FC	0	(0)
2021–2023	Créteil	20	(0)
2021–2023	Créteil II	7	(0)
2023–	FC 93	53	(1)

International career^{‡}
2022–	French Guiana	17	(4)
- * Club domestic league appearances and goals as of 20:29, 20 February 2026 (UTC) ‡ National team caps and goals as of 20:29, 20 February 2026 (UTC)

Thomas Christian Némouthé (born 16 January 2001) is a professional footballer who plays as a midfielder for Championnat National 1 club FC 93. Born in metropolitan France, he plays for the French Guiana national team.

== Club career ==
Némouthé made his professional debut for Paris FC in a 1–0 Coupe de France win over Le Havre on 19 January 2021. He would make one further cup appearance for the club before signing for Créteil on a free transfer at the end of the season.

== International career ==
Némouthé made his debut for French Guiana in a 3–1 friendly win over Suriname on 22 May 2022.

== Career statistics ==
=== International ===
Scores and results list French Guiana's goal tally first, score column indicates score after each Nemouthé goal.

List of international goals scored by Thomas Némouthé
No.	Date	Venue	Opponent	Score	Result	Competition
1	2 June 2022	Stade Georges-Chaumet, Cayenne, French Guiana	Guatemala	2–0	2–0	2022–23 CONCACAF Nations League B
2	17 June 2023	DRV PNK Stadium, Fort Lauderdale, United States	Sint Maarten	4–1	4–1	2023 CONCACAF Gold Cup qualification
3	13 October 2023	Arnos Vale Stadium, Kingstown, Saint Vincent and the Grenadines	Saint Vincent and the Grenadines	1–0	4–1	2023–24 CONCACAF Nations League B
4	16 October 2023	Stade Pierre-Aliker, Fort-de-France, Martinique	Saint Vincent and the Grenadines	1–0	3–2	2023–24 CONCACAF Nations League B
