= Reeco Hackett-Fairchild =

Saint Lucian footballer

Reeco Hackett
Personal information
- Full name: Reeco Lee Hackett-Fairchild
- Date of birth: 9 January 1998 (age 28)
- Place of birth: Redbridge, England
- Height: 6 ft 3 in (1.91 m)
- Position: Winger

Team information
- Current team: Lincoln City
- Number: 7

Youth career
- Fulham
- Brighton & Hove Albion
- 2014–2016: Dagenham & Redbridge

Senior career*
Years	Team	Apps	(Gls)
2016	Dagenham & Redbridge	0	(0)
2016	→ Dulwich Hamlet (loan)	1	(0)
2016–2019	Charlton Athletic	12	(0)
2018	→ Boreham Wood (loan)	4	(0)
2019	→ Bromley (loan)	5	(1)
2019–2020	Bromley	23	(8)
2020–2023	Portsmouth	60	(7)
2020	→ Bromley (loan)	11	(2)
2021	→ Southend United (loan)	25	(1)
2023–	Lincoln City	117	(24)

International career^{‡}
2023–	Saint Lucia	4	(2)
- * Club domestic league appearances and goals as of 16:59, 21 November 2026 (UTC) ‡ National team caps and goals as of 13:52, 14 November 2026 (UTC)

Reeco Lee Hackett-Fairchild (born 9 January 1998) is a professional footballer who plays as a winger for EFL Championship club Lincoln City. Born in England, he plays for the Saint Lucia national team.

== Career ==
=== Dagenham & Redbridge ===
Hackett was born in the London Borough of Redbridge, and started his career in the youth sides of Fulham and Brighton & Hove Albion. He then joined the Academy side at local side Dagenham & Redbridge in the summer of 2014 to start a two-year scholarship. In March 2016, he joined Isthmian League Premier Division side Dulwich Hamlet on a youth loan and went on to make one appearance in a draw against Wingate & Finchley. At the end of the season he failed to earn a professional contract at Dagenham and was subsequently released. He later joined Norwich City and then Charlton Athletic on a six-week trial.

=== Charlton Athletic ===
His trial at Charlton proved to be successful and he was rewarded with an initial three-month contract which was later extended until the end of the season. Hackett-Fairchild was part of the under-23 side that won the regional league title and penned a one-year contract extension due to his contribution during the campaign. He made his professional debut in August 2017, replacing Tony Watt as a substitute in the 2–1 victory over Exeter City in the EFL Cup.

Hackett-Fairchild scored his first professional goals when he scored twice in an EFL Trophy tie against Swansea City U21s in December 2017.

On 7 September 2018, Hackett-Fairchild joined National League side Boreham Wood on an initial month's loan.

=== Bromley ===
On 12 March 2019, Hackett-Fairchild joined National League side Bromley on loan until 6 April 2019. During the summer he then joined the club on a permanent basis.

=== Portsmouth ===
On 6 January 2020, Hackett-Fairchild signed for Portsmouth to bolster their attacking options.

On 21 September 2020, Hackett-Fairchild returned to Bromley on loan.

On 7 January 2021, Hackett-Fairchild signed for Southend United on loan. Two days later he scored three minutes into his debut against Barrow, which was also his 23rd birthday.

He scored his first goal for Portsmouth in an EFL Cup tie against Millwall on 10 August 2021.

=== Lincoln City ===
On 14 June 2023, Hackett-Fairchild joined Lincoln City for an undisclosed fee on a three-year deal. On 5 August 2023, he made his Lincoln City debut coming off the bench against Bolton Wanderers. His first Imps goal came a week later, netting the first in a 3-0 win against Wycombe Wanderers. His goal against Northampton Town on 15 August was nominated for the EFL League One Goal of the Month, and would eventually go on to win the award. After returning from a hamstring injury, he would get an EFL League One Player of the Month nomination for February 2024, with four goals and two assists in the five games.

In January 2026, the club exercised their one-year option, extending this contract until the summer of 2027. His contract was officially extended prior to the 2026–27 season, keeping him at the club until 2029.

== International career ==
In 2021, Hackett-Fairchild expressed his desire to one day play for the Saint Lucia national football team, for which he is eligible through a grandmother.

On 6 June 2023, Hackett-Fairchild received his first international call-up. He went on to make his international debut on 16 June 2023, scoring Saint Lucia's only goal in a 3–1 defeat to Martinique in the 2023 CONCACAF Gold Cup Preliminary Round.

== Personal life ==
In June 2018, Hackett-Fairchild was arrested whilst on holiday in Ibiza on suspicion of sexual assault. His teammate Karlan Grant was also arrested in connection with the incident. In 2022, both players were cleared of wrongdoing.

== Career statistics ==
=== Club ===
As of 21 November 2026

Appearances and goals by club, season and competition
Club	Season	League			FA Cup		League Cup		Other		Total	
Club	Season	Division	Apps	Goals	Apps	Goals	Apps	Goals	Apps	Goals	Apps	Goals
Dagenham & Redbridge	2015–16	League Two	0	0	0	0	0	0	0	0	0	0
Dulwich Hamlet (loan)	2015–16	IL Premier Division	1	0	—		—		—		1	0
Charlton Athletic	2016–17	League One	0	0	0	0	0	0	0	0	0	0
Charlton Athletic	2017–18	League One	5	0	1	0	1	0	5 (Note: Appearances in the EFL Trophy)	2	12	2
Charlton Athletic	2018–19	League One	7	0	2	0	1	0	2	0	12	0
Charlton Athletic	Charlton Athletic total		12	0	3	0	2	0	7	2	24	2
Boreham Wood (loan)	2018–19	National League	4	0	0	0	—		1 (Note: One appearance in the Scottish Challenge Cup.)	0	5	0
Bromley (loan)	2018–19	National League	5	1	0	0	—		0	0	5	1
Bromley	2019–20	National League	23	8	2	0	—		0	0	25	8
Portsmouth	2019–20	League One	0	0	0	0	0	0	1	0	1	0
Portsmouth	2020–21	League One	0	0	0	0	0	0	0	0	0	0
Portsmouth	2021–22	League One	27	4	2	0	1	1	4	0	34	5
Portsmouth	2022–23	League One	33	3	3	2	2	0	6	1	44	6
Portsmouth	Portsmouth total		60	7	5	2	3	1	11	1	79	11
Bromley (loan)	2020–21	National League	11	2	2	0	—		0	0	13	2
Bromley (loan)	Bromley total		39	11	4	0	0	0	0	0	43	11
Southend United (loan)	2020–21	League Two	25	1	—		—		—		25	1
Lincoln City	2023–24	League One	29	7	0	0	3	0	1	0	33	7
Lincoln City	2024–25	League One	33	4	3	0	0	0	3	0	39	4
Lincoln City	2025–26	League One	41	11	0	0	2	0	2	1	45	12
Lincoln City	2026–27	Championship	14	2	0	0	3	0	—		17	2
Lincoln City	Lincoln City total		117	24	3	0	8	0	6	1	134	25
Career total			258	42	15	2	13	1	25	4	311	50

=== International ===
As of 13 November 2026

National team	Year	Apps	Goals
Saint Lucia	2023	2	2
Saint Lucia	2024	1	0
Saint Lucia	2025	0	0
Saint Lucia	2026	1	0
Total		4	2

As of 13 September 2026
Saint Lucia score listed first, score column indicates score after each Hackett-Fairchild goal.

List of international goals scored by Reeco Hackett-Fairchild
No.	Date	Venue	Cap	Opponent	Score	Result	Competition	Ref.
1	16 June 2023	DRV PNK Stadium, Fort Lauderdale, USA	1	Martinique	1–1	1–3	2023 CONCACAF Gold Cup qualification	
2	7 September 2023	Stadion Rignaal 'Jean' Francisca, Willemstad, Curaçao	2	Sint Maarten	3–1	5–1	2023–24 CONCACAF Nations League B	

== Honours ==
Lincoln City

- EFL League One: 2025–26
