= St. Martin de Porres Church, Salem =

St. Martin de Porres Church
- St. Martin de Porres Church
- 16°44′59″N 62°13′21″W
- Location: Salem
- Country: Montserrat; United Kingdom
- Denomination: Roman Catholic Church

The St. Martin de Porres Church is a religious building of the Catholic Church located in the town of Salem, on the Caribbean island of Montserrat, part of the Lesser Antilles and a British overseas territory.

The temple follows the Roman or Latin rite and depends on the mission of St. Patrick in Lookout which in turn is attached to the diocese of Saint John's - Basseterre (Dioecesis Sancti Ioannis Imatellurana) which assumed its present name by decree "Plures in Mari" of the congregation for the evangelization of peoples (Congregatio pro gentium evangelizatione) under the pontificate of Pope John Paul II.

As its name implies, the church was dedicated to St. Martin de Porres, a Peruvian friar of the Dominican order.

== See also ==
- Roman Catholicism in the United Kingdom
- St. Martin de Porres Church, Belize City
