= Montserrat Community College =

Location
- Salem, Montserrat W. I. Salem; Montserrat
- Coordinates: 16.7553587°N 62.217893600000025°W

Information
- Type: Community college/Sixth-form college
- Established: 2003
- Affiliation: Government of Montserrat

Montserrat Community College (MCC) is a post-16 years of age community college in Salem, Montserrat, offering Caribbean Advanced Proficiency Examinations (CAPE) courses (sixth-form college and associate degree), as well as tertiary vocational courses in construction and cosmetology.

== History ==
Historically Montserrat Technical College (MTC) was in operation, and additionally the Montserrat Secondary School (MSS) provided vocational education, as well as sixth-form college. The community college was built with an estimated cost of more than six million Eastern Caribbean dollars; it was funded by the UK Department for International Development and the European Union. Montserrat Community College Act 2003 established the college. MCC opened in 2004, taking over sixth-form studies from MSS. Initially classes were held at the former Salem Primary School. MCC's current campus opened on August 28, 2005. “For the past two years’ students at the college have undertaken short weekly personal development sessions entitled ‘My Time’ on a range of topics from Financial Planning and Savings to managing stress, sexuality and ethics.”

In 2015, principal Vernie Clarice Barnes presented a weekly personal development sessions on a range of subjects including management of stress, financial planning, sexuality and morality to the students. Barnes resigned as principal of the college in October 2017.

== See also ==
- Education in Montserrat
