= Akeem Priestley =

Jamaican footballer (born 1985)

Personal information
- Full name: Akeem Sayeed Priestley
- Date of birth: 13 April 1985 (age 41)
- Place of birth: Kingston, Jamaica
- Height: 5 ft 10 in (1.78 m)
- Position: Winger

Team information
- Current team: Master's Futbol

Youth career
- 2003–2005: Harbour View

College career
Years	Team	Apps	(Gls)
2005	Jacksonville Dolphins		
2006–2008	UConn Huskies		

Senior career*
Years	Team	Apps	(Gls)
2009–2010	Harbour View	16	(3)
2009–2010	→ FK Mughan (loan)	12	(0)
2011	Los Angeles Blues	18	(3)
2012	Dayton Dutch Lions	17	(2)
2013	RoPS	9	(1)
2015	Sheikh Russel KC	16	(2)
2015	Antigua GFC	6	(1)
2016	Isidro Metapán		
2017–2018	Harbour View	14	(1)
2018	CSC Mississauga		
2019–	Master's Futbol	14	(4)

International career
2000–2002	Jamaica U17	10	(2)
2004–2005	Jamaica U20	8	(5)
2004–2006	Jamaica	6	(2)
- * Club domestic league appearances and goals as of 7 September 2019

Akeem Sayeed Priestley (born 13 April 1985) is a Jamaican professional footballer who plays for Canadian club Master's Futbol as a winger.

== Club career ==
Priestley played his college career in the United States at Jacksonville University and also at the University of Connecticut. He was an All-Big East 2nd team selection in 2008, and also lead University of Connecticut to the 2007 Big East title.

Priestley was drafted by Kansas City Wizards in the 2009 MLS SuperDraft (50th overall), but was not offered a contract by the club. Priestley later signed with Jamaican club Harbour View who loaned him out to Azerbaijan based club FK Mughan for the 2009/2010 season. In April 2011, Priestley signed with the Los Angeles Blues for the season. He joined Dayton Dutch Lions for the 2012 season.

On 15 August 2013, Priestley signed with RoPS in the Veikkausliiga for the remainder of the 2013 season. In January 2015, Priestley joined Sheikh Russel KC of the Bangladesh Premier League on trial and then signed until July 2015.

On 16 October 2015, after a trial period, Priestley joined Antigua GFC for the remainder of the 2015/2016 season. He scored his first goal for Antigua GFC on 4 November 2015 in a 2–1 home win over Deportivo Mictlán. In 2018, he played in the Canadian Soccer League with CSC Mississauga. In 2019, he joined with Master's Futbol in League1 Ontario.

== International career ==
Priestley was an instrumental member of the Jamaica Under-17 and Under-20 youth national teams from 2002 to 2005. In October 2004, Priestley made his senior national team debut versus Guatemala in Fort Lauderdale, Florida.

== Career statistics ==
=== International ===
Jamaica national team
Year	Apps	Goals
2004	5	2
2006	1	0
Total	6	2

Scores and results list Jamaica's goal tally first, score column indicates score after each Priestley goal.

List of international goals scored by Akeem Priestley
No.	Date	Venue	Opponent	Score	Result	Competition
1	26 November 2004	Jarrett Park, Montego Bay, Jamaica	U.S. Virgin Islands	11–0	11–1	2005 Caribbean Cup qualification
2	12 December 2004	George Odlum Stadium, Vieux Fort, Saint Lucia	Saint Lucia	1–1	1–1	2005 Caribbean Cup qualification

== Honours ==
Antigua GFC

- Liga Nacional de Guatemala: 1

2015 Apertura
