= Jaafar Munroe =

Trinidad and Tobago footballer

Personal information
- Full name: Jaafar Munroe
- Height: 5 ft 11 in (1.80 m)
- Position: Striker

Team information
- Current team: North East Stars

Senior career*
Years	Team	Apps	(Gls)
2004–2005	Ideal SC	?	(1)
2005–	North East Stars	?	(?)

International career
2004–	Montserrat	1	(0)
- * Club domestic league appearances and goals

Jaafar Munroe is a striker for North East Stars in Trinidad and Tobago. He has also previously played for Ideal SC in Montserrat.

== Career ==
Munroe made history when he scored for Ideal SC in the CFU Club Championship in 2005 against Harbour View FC as he became the first person to score a goal in the competitions for ideal and still remains the only person to score in the competition for ideal. He is also the only montserratian to score in the competition and still holds this record
