= 1974 Montserrat Championship =

Montserrat Championship
- Season: 1974
- Champions: Police

The 1975 season of the Montserrat Championship was the first season of top flight association football competition in Montserrat. Police won the championship.
