= Royal Montserrat Police Service =

Police service of Montserrat

- Flag of Montserrat
- Abbreviation: RMPS

Agency overview
- Formed: 1967
- Preceding agency: Leeward Islands Police Force

Jurisdictional structure
- Operations jurisdiction: Montserrat, British Overseas Territories
- Area: 39 square miles
- Population: 4,649 (2018)
- General nature: Local civilian police

Operational structure
- Headquarters: Royal Montserrat Police Service, Government of Headquarters, Brades, P.O. Box 177, MSR 1110, Montserrat
- Constables: approx. 50
- Agency executive: Mark Payne QPM MBA, Commissioner of Police

Website
- Official Website

The Royal Montserrat Police Service is the police service of the British Overseas Territory island of Montserrat in the Caribbean.

As of May 2024, the Commissioner of Police is Mark Payne QPM MBA, a career police officer of West Midlands Police in England. Mark retired from West Midlands Police in March 2024, where he served as Detective Chief Superintendent and Head of West Midlands Regional Counter Terrorism Unit.

== History ==
The Police Force of Montserrat was a division of the Leeward Islands Police Force, which served Antigua, St Kitts and Nevis, Anguilla, Montserrat and the British Virgin Islands, with headquarters in Antigua. The Leeward Islands Colony was dissolved in 1959 and the Montserrat Police Force became a division of the Antigua, Montserrat, and British Virgin Islands Police Force. The Royal Title was bestowed on the force in 1966, and The Royal Montserrat Police Service became autonomous on 27 February 1967.

Between the years 1967 and 2007, there was one Chief of Police and ten Commissioners of Police from countries such as United Kingdom, Guyana, St Kitts-Nevis and even native islanders.

The police service also ran a football team that played in the Montserrat Championship, the top level of football on the island. They were the most successful club winning the league four times.

The RMPS celebrated its 50th anniversary in February 2017, having been disbanded from the Leeward Islands Police Force in 1967.

== Structure and Duties ==
The RMPS is a civilian, local police force and has authority to uphold the King's peace throughout the territory. The RMPS website states that their duty is:

- Preservation of the King's Peace,
- Protection of Life & Property,
- Prevention and Detection of Crime and
- Bringing Offenders to Justice.

=== Departments/Units ===
The RMPS is divided into five main departments, each with a specific function.

These are:

- Beat & Patrol
- Traffic Department
- Marine & Immigration Department
- Human Resource/Training/IT Department
- Criminal Investigation Department (CID)/Criminal Records Office

=== Rank structure ===
The management rank structure of the RMPS follows that of most UK and British Overseas Territories.

The Commissioner (head of the service) is assisted by a Deputy Commissioner of Police and Superintendent of Operations.

==== Regular Ranks ====
Ranks of the Royal Montserrat Police Service
Rank	Commissioner of Police (COP)	Deputy Commissioner of Police (DCP)	Superintendent of Police (Sup Ops)	Inspector of Police (OIC Departments)	Sergeant (SPO)	Constable (PC)
Insignia	Chief Constable	DCC	UK Police Superintendent Epaulette	UK Police Inspector Epaulette	UK Patrol Sergeant Epaulette	UK Police Constable Epaulette

==== New "Recognition Ranks" ====
- Chief Inspector
- Station Sergeant
- Corporal
- Senior Constable

==== New "Marine Unit Ranks" ====
- Marine Sergeant (MS)
- Petty Officer (PO)
- Leading Seaman (LS)
- Able Body Seaman (ABS)
- Ordinary Seaman (OS)

=== Special Constables ===
The RMPS employs special constables to assist regular constables, or to act as specialists and support regulars on 'Special Duty Police Assignments', if necessary.

== Uniforms and Equipment ==
The RMPS employs a variety of staff & constables and each have different types of uniform and equipment, to perform their duties effectively.

=== Uniform ===
RMPS uniform is typical of British & Caribbean police forces' uniforms, with several different types for different duties, ranks and seasons. It is modelled on other UK and British Overseas Territories police uniforms.

=== Formal Uniform ===
The formal uniform is for ceremonial and important occasions, such as Remembrance Days, VE Day celebrations, Royal events, etc.

It consists of:

==== "Blues" ====
This is similar to the British Army's No. 2/service dress uniform.

- Dark blue tunic, open at collar with white shirt & dark tie underneath
- Dark blue trousers/skirt
- Sam Browne belt
- Dark blue peaked cap (males) or bowler cap (females), the RMPS logo forms the capbadge and a certain amount of braid on the cap is added for ranks from Inspector above.
- Black shoes/boots
- Dark gloves.

==== "Whites" ====
This uniform is similar to the British Army's No. 3 (Tropical) Dress, which is the most formal.

- White tunic with silver buttons, worn open with white shirt and tie (females) and worn closed with high collar for males
- Black trousers (males) or skirt (females) with white piping
- Black belt with central clasp (lower ranks) or shoulder belt (senior officers)
- White pith helmet (males), white-topped bowler cap (females) with capbadge
- Black boots
- White gloves.

==== Notes ====
- Swords or swagger sticks (Inspectors and above) may be carried on certain occasions.
- Medals (if any awarded) are worn on the left breast, above the breast pocket and medal ribbons are sewn into the tunic.
- Rank insignia for Inspectors and above are worn on the shoulders/epaulettes. Sergeants wear three chevrons on the upper arm and constables wear no rank insignia.
- Constables and Sergeants wear a "Collar Number", on some part of the uniform.
- The staple British police whistle-on-chain is worn on the chest/left pocket area of most uniforms.

=== "Undress" Uniform ===
The undress uniform is the uniform that is worn by police officers for non-formal and non-arduous work, such as everyday work, travelling, patrolling, attending meetings etc. It is similar to the British Army's No. 6 (Warm Weather) Barrack Dress and is 'stone' coloured.

It consists of:

- Stone coloured bush jacket with silver buttons
- Stone coloured trousers
- Peaked cap (males) and female peaked cap (females) with RMPS capbadge
- Black boots/shoes.

==== Notes ====
- Constables wear their "Collar Number" on the right breast of the shirt.
- Rank insignia for Inspectors and above are worn on the shoulders/epaulettes. Sergeants wear three chevrons on the upper arm and constables wear no rank insignia.
- Lanyards may be worn by senior officers on the left side.
- Medal ribbons (if any) are worn on the left breast.
- The staple British police whistle-on-chain is worn on the chest/left pocket area of most uniforms.

=== Operational Uniform ===
The operational uniform for officers is either the "Undress" uniform (see above) (with additional equipment, e.g. yellow traffic vest) or a similar uniform, but with a white shirt and black trousers, rather than stone coloured shirt/trousers.

=== Police Equipment ===
The RMPS uses a variety of equipment, such as radios, handcuffs and yellow traffic vests. The staple British police whistle-on-chain is worn on the chest/left pocket area of most uniforms.

==== Firearms ====
The RMPS are generally unarmed, but for some formal parades some weapons are carried, such as:

- Sword (ceremonial sabre) – carried by senior officers (Inspectors in above), in either "Blues" or "Whites" formal uniform. It can be worn in it sheath, or 'drawn' when inspecting constables.
- Rifle – either a No. 4 Lee Enfield Rifle or a more modern rifle. This is for the constables to carry on parade.
- Drill cane/pace stick – this is for Sergeants to carry when on parade, when not carrying rifles.
- Swagger stick (shorter cane) – this is for Inspectors and above to carry, when not carrying swords.
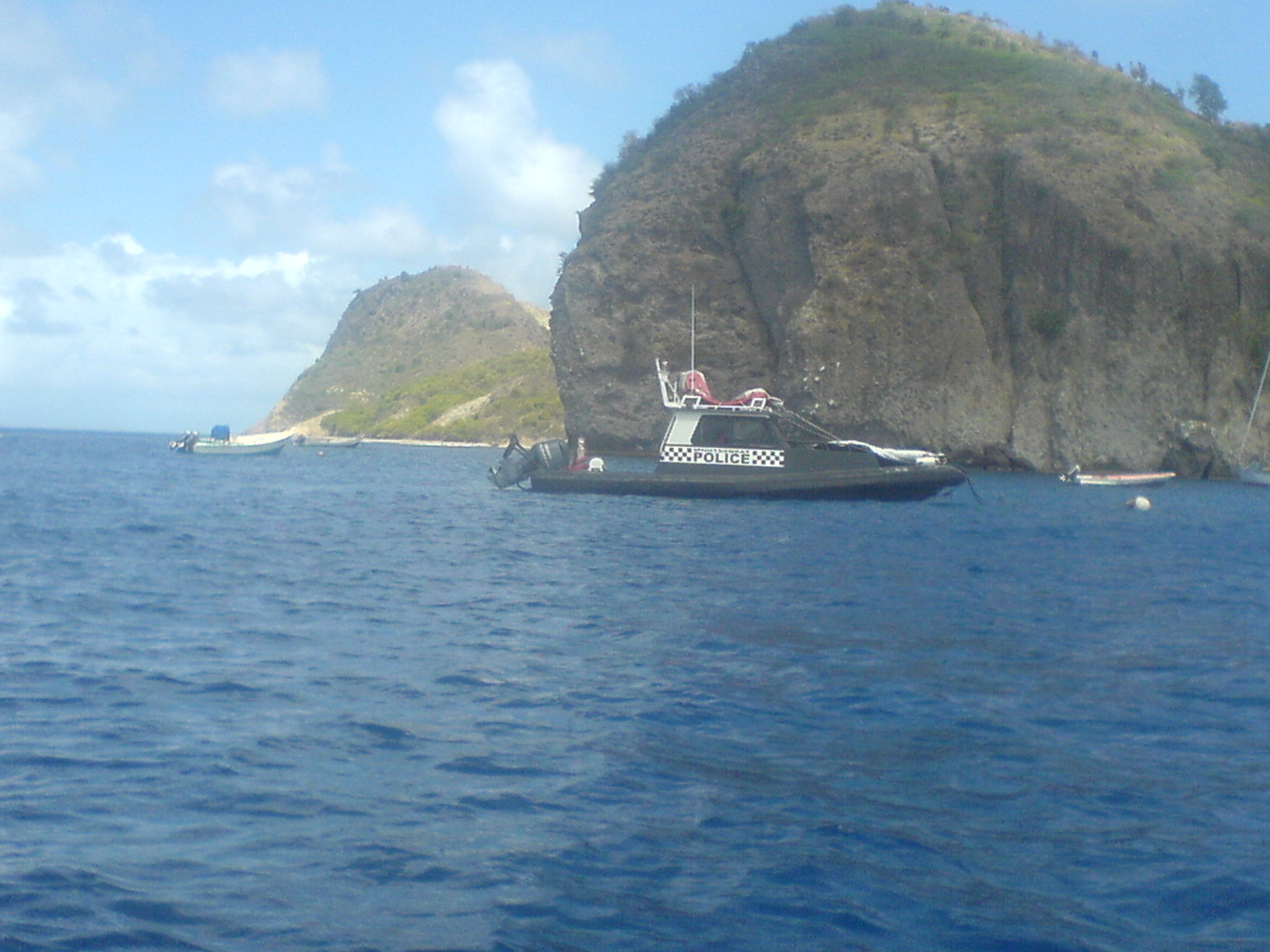
RMPS Marine Unit boat
