= Fabian Davis =

Jamaican footballer (born 1974)

Personal information
- Full name: Fabian Davis
- Date of birth: 30 June 1974 (age 52)
- Place of birth: Swallowfield, East Kingston, Jamaica
- Height: 5 ft 9 in (1.75 m)
- Positions: Wingback; midfielder

Senior career*
Years	Team	Apps	(Gls)
- Real Mona
1996	Atlanta Ruckus		
- Harbour View F.C.
1998	Seattle Sounders	20	(0)
1999–2004	Arnett Gardens		
2004–2007	Tivoli Gardens		
2007–2008	Portmore United		
2008–2010	Arnett Gardens		

International career
1995–2007	Jamaica	88	(6)
- * Club domestic league appearances and goals

Fabian Davis (born 30 June 1974) is a Jamaican former footballer who played as a defender or midfielder.

On 7 October 2008 to January 2010, he became interim player/coach of Arnett Gardens F.C., after Jerome Waite was sacked following a poor start to the season.

== Club career ==
Nicknamed Fabulous, he has also played for Real Mona, Harbour View F.C. and Arnett Gardens F.C., Tivoli Gardens FC, and Portmore United F.C. all in Jamaica as well as for Seattle Sounders in the USL First Division. While with Arnett Gardens, he captained the side to league titles in 2001 and 2002 and also claimed the Most Valuable Player and the Player of the Season titles those years.

Davis had an unsuccessful trial with Scottish side Livingston in summer 2003.

He went on to join Tivoli Gardens F.C. in the January 2004 transfer window and was instrumental in Tivoli Gardens winning the Premier League title in 2004. Fabian Davis has the distinction of being the only player to cop the Most Valuable Player and Player of the season award for two separate winning premier league teams, as he picked up these awards for Tivoli Gardens F.C. in the 2003–4 season, along with the Player Personality Award. He rejoined Arnett from Portmore United in the January 2008 transfer window, and went on to serve as player coach for 1 1/2 seasons from October 2008 to January 2010.

== International career ==
A veteran of the national team, he made his debut for the Reggae Boyz in 1995 against Canada and has collected over 70 caps since, although he missed out on the 1998 FIFA World Cup squad. He usually plays wingback for the Reggae Boyz, including the 2007 Lunar Cup when Jamaica won the title. In November 2010, Fabian captained the Jamaica national beach soccer team that failed to advance to the semi-finals of the CONCACAF championships, following narrow losses to defending champs, El Salvador, and tournament hosts Mexico.

== The early years ==
Fabian Davis attended Kingston College and was Captain of both the Manning Cup and Colts U-16 Teams. He was also Captain of Jamaica's U-20 and U-23 football teams. Davis was also Jamaica national U-16 basketball team representative, and a member of the title winning Kingston College basketball team.

== Coaching career ==
Fabian Davis attained the JFF Advanced Level 1 and 11 coaching certifications, as well as the United States Soccer Federation, U.S. Youth Soccer Coaching Course, National D License from Georgia State Soccer Association in July 2009. He had a successful 2008 stint as player/coach of Arnett Gardens F.C. where he took the team from 11th place in October 2008 to a 5th-place finish to end the season in 2009. A string of poor results in 2010 saw him resign as coach of the struggling Arnett Gardens outfit.

== Endorsements ==
Davis had endorsement deals with major Jamaica brands, such as Wisynco's Bigga Soft Drink Brand in 2002 , Digicel in 2004 and with Western Sports through their Adidas brand. He has also shot campaigns for Victoria Mutual Building Society for 2011. Davis has done football analysis working with Jamaica's TVJ for the 2006 and 2010 World Cup highlights shows and on caribbean media giant, SportsMax.

== See also ==
- 2007 Lunar New Year Cup
