= Angelo Cappello =

Belizean footballer (born 2002)

Personal information
- Full name: Angelo Santo Cappello
- Date of birth: 27 January 2002 (age 24)
- Place of birth: Corozal Town, Belize
- Height: 1.70 m (5 ft 7 in)
- Position: Left winger

Team information
- Current team: Torquay United

Youth career
- –2020: Sheffield United

Senior career*
Years	Team	Apps	(Gls)
2020–2022	Sheffield United	0	(0)
2022	→ Blyth Spartans (loan)	12	(1)
2022–2026	FC Halifax Town	121	(5)
2026–	Torquay United	0	(0)

International career^{‡}
2019	Belize U17	2	(0)
2021–	Belize	9	(1)
- * Club domestic league appearances and goals as of 12:53, 5 September 2026 (UTC) ‡ National team caps and goals as of 26 March 2025

Angelo Santo Cappello (born 27 January 2002) is a Belizean professional footballer who plays as a left winger for National League South club Torquay United and the Belize national team.

== Club career ==
Born in Belize, Cappello moved to the United Kingdom with his family at the age of 11. In August 2020, he signed a professional contract with Premier League club Sheffield United.

On 11 March 2022, Cappello joined National League North side Blyth Spartans on loan for the remainder of the 2021–22 season. On 22 July 2022, he signed for National League side FC Halifax Town after he was released by Sheffield United.

On 5 September 2026, Cappello joined National League South club Torquay United.

== International career ==
Cappello has represented Belize at youth international level. In November 2018, he received his first call-up to the Belize national team for 2019–20 CONCACAF Nations League qualifying match against Puerto Rico. On 25 March 2021, he made his senior debut for Belize in a 2–0 loss to Haiti.

== Personal life ==
Cappello was born in Belize to an Italian father and a Belizean mother. He is the nephew of former Belizean footballer Orlando Jiménez.

== Career statistics ==
=== International ===
As of match played 25 March 2025

Appearances and goals by national team and year
National team	Year	Apps	Goals
Belize	2021	2	0
Belize	2022	3	0
Belize	2023	2	1
Belize	2025	2	0
Total		9	1

Scores and results list Belize's goal tally first, score column indicates score after each Cappello goal.

List of international goals scored by Angelo Cappello
No.	Date	Venue	Opponent	Score	Result	Competition
1	12 September 2023	Stade Municipal Dr. Edmard Lama, Remire-Montjoly, French Guiana	French Guiana	2–0	2–0	2023–24 CONCACAF Nations League

== Honours ==
FC Halifax Town

- FA Trophy: 2022–23
