= 1996–97 Montserrat Championship =

Montserrat Championship
- Season: 1995–96
- Champions: None – competition abandoned

The 1996–97 season of the Montserrat Championship was the fourth recorded season of top flight association football competition in Montserrat, with records for any competition held between 1975 and 1995 not available. The competition was abandoned when the Soufrière Hills erupted, causing widespread devastation to the island.

== Participating teams ==
The following five teams took part in the competition:

- Royal Montserrat Police Force
- Montserrat Volcano Observatory Tremors
- Seventh Day Adventists Trendsetters
- Ideal Boys
- N.N.

== Known results ==
Only two results are known from the season: a 3–2 victory for the Tremors over the Police in the opening round, and a 4–3 victory for Ideal over the Trendsetters at an unknown stage of the competition.
