= Bata Falcons =

Association football club in Montserrat

- Full name: Bata Falcons
- Nickname(s): The Falcons
- Founded: 1974
- Ground: Salem Oval
- League: Montserrat Championship
Home colours	Away colours

Bata Falcons is a football club from Montserrat founded in 1974.

== Honours ==
- Barclays Knockout Trophy (1974)
- Montserrat Championship (1975)
