= Salem, Montserrat =

Salem
- Town
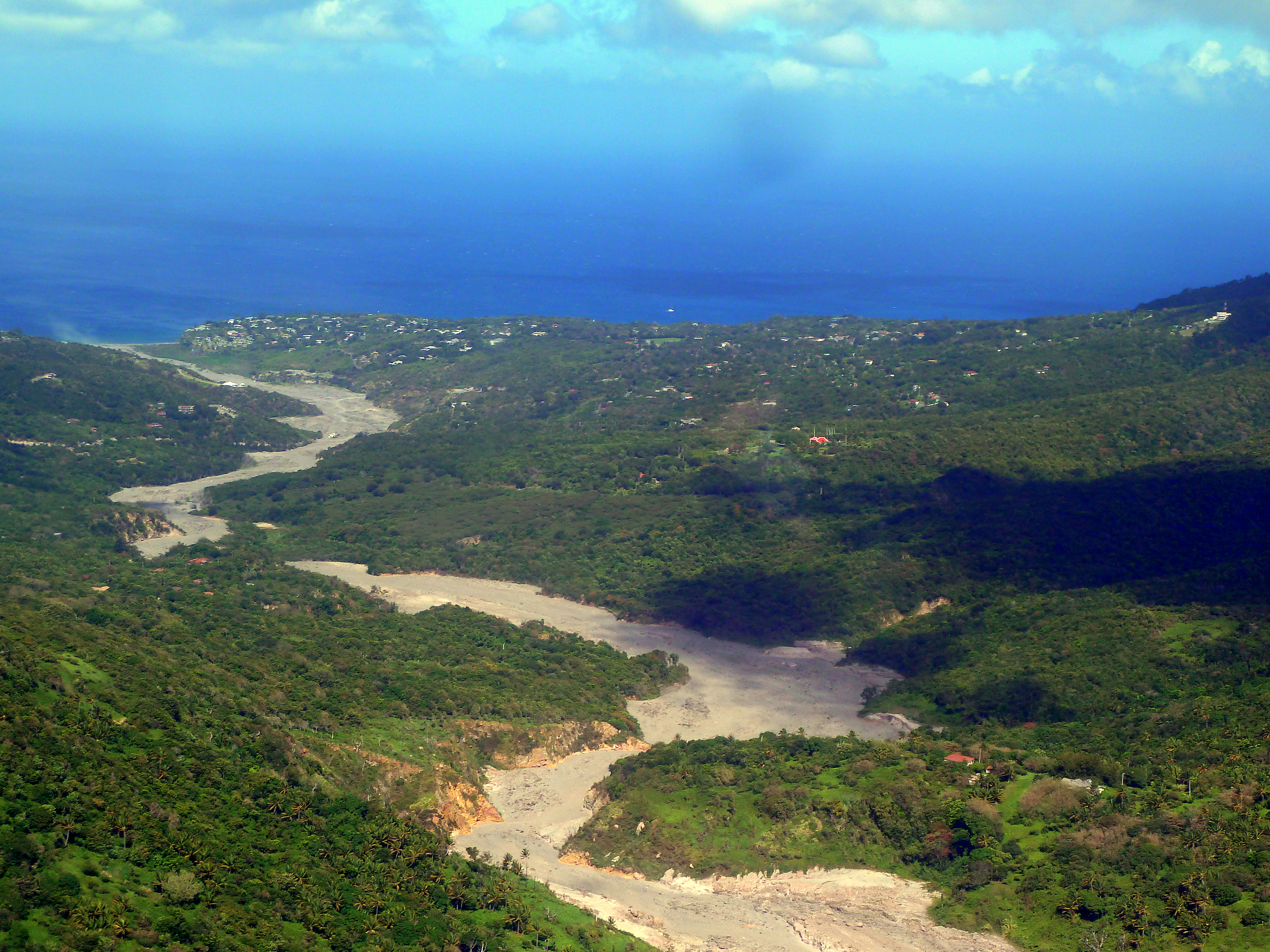

- Location of Salem within Montserrat Salem (the Caribbean)
- Coordinates: 16°45′N 62°13′W
- Country: United Kingdom
- Overseas territory: Montserrat

Population
  - Total: 1,140 (2,011)
- Time zone: UTC-4 (Atlantic)

Salem is the most populous town in Montserrat, a British Overseas Territory in the West Indies, situated on the western coast of the island, in St Peter Parish.

Salem was evacuated on 16 August 1997, after the 1997 eruptions of Soufrière Hills on the island, but was resettled in October 1998.

Beatles record producer George Martin lived in Olveston House, which is in the town of Salem, and set up the renowned AIR Montserrat studios nearby on Friths Road in 1979. The studio is now in ruins, after it was destroyed by Hurricane Hugo in 1989, but Olveston House operates as a guest house.

== Education ==
The Montserrat government operates Salem Daycare and Salem Nursery.

The island's only pre-16 years of age secondary school, the government-operated Montserrat Secondary School (MSS), is in Salem. Montserrat Community College (MCC) is a post-16 and tertiary educational institution in Salem.

In the pre-1997 period it was served by Salem Primary School, and Salem Junior Secondary School.

== See also ==
- St. Martin de Porres Church, Salem
