= Montserrat Championship =

Association football league in Montserrat

- Sport: Football
- Founded: 1974
- No. of teams: 10
- Country: Montserrat
- Most recent champion: Police
- Level on pyramid: 1
- International cup: CFU Club Shield

The Montserrat Championship is the top association football division in Montserrat. It was created in 1974 but has been competed-for only sporadically, partially as a result of the Soufrière Hills eruption causing widespread devastation to the island in 1997. Between 2005 and 2015, no league was played. The league restarted in 2016, but has been stopped again in 2018.

== History ==
Football was first brought to Montserrat during World War 2 and grew in popularity during the 1960s and 1970s at which time the championship and Football Association were established, The first iteration of the national championship was held in 1974 and was won by the Police. A second season was played the following year, won by Bata Falcons, but following that there are no records of any form of organized competition until 1995, when the Police team again won the championship. Just as organized football on Montserrat was beginning to get going, a major eruption of the Soufrière Hills volcano caused widespread destruction of large parts of the island, with many villages being abandoned. As a result, the 1996–97 season was abandoned part way through and no formal competition was held on the island until 2000, when the competition was again won by the police team. Further competitions were held each year until 2004, when Ideal became only the third team to win the championship in its history. This was the last recorded season of formal competition on the island until 2016 when the competition occurred again.

== Clubs ==
Most league games take place at the 1,000-capacity Blakes Estate Stadium.

- Bata Falcons
- Elberton FC
- Ideal SC
- Jolly Roger FC
- Little Bay FC
- Montserrat Volcano Observatory Tremors
- PC United
- Royal Montserrat Police Force
- Seven Day Adventists Trendsetters FC
- St. John's FC

=== Previous clubs ===
- Montserrat Secondary School
- Salem FC
- Kinsale FC

== Previous winners ==
Season	Winner
1974	Police
1975	Bata Falcons
1976–1995	not known
1995–96	Royal Montserrat Police Force
1996–97	abandoned
1998–99	no championship
2000	Royal Montserrat Police Force
2001	Royal Montserrat Police Force
2002–03	Royal Montserrat Police Force
2004	Ideal
2005–15	no championship
2016	Royal Montserrat Police Force
2017–19	not known
2020–present	no championship

== Topscorers ==
Year	Best scorers	Team	Goals
2001	(Montserrat) Ottley Laborde	Royal Montserrat Police Force	21
2002/03	(Montserrat) Ottley Laborde	Royal Montserrat Police Force	8
