= Montserrat Volcano Observatory Tremors =

Montserratian association football club

MVO Tremors
- Full name: Montserrat Volcano Observatory Tremors Football Club
- Nicknames: The Tremors; The Volcanoes; The Scientists
- Founded: 1995
- Ground: Blakes Estate Stadium
- Capacity: 1,000
- League: Montserrat Championship
Home colours	Away colours

Montserrat Volcano Observatory Tremors (also known as MVO Tremors, Tremors FC, Volcano Observatory, and MVO), is a professional football club based in Salem, Montserrat. They compete in the Montserrat Championship, the top flight football league in Montserrat. Their colours are green and red.

== History ==
The club was founded in 1995 by researchers at the Montserrat Volcano Observatory, leading to the club's nicknames of The Scientists and The Volcanoes. Most of the players in team history have been researchers at the observatory. Although headquartered at the Observatory in Salem, Tremors play some home matches at Blakes Estate Stadium. They previously played at Montserrat's national cricket stadium Salem Oval.

The Montserrat Championship has only been played sporadically since Tremors were founded. The Tremors played their first match the same year they were founded against the Royal Montserrat Police Service. The Tremors won the league title in their inaugural season. The next season was abandoned due to the Soufrière Hills volcano eruption which rendered half the island uninhabitable. The Tremors had lost all three games they played up until abandonment in the defence of their title. Football did not resume in Montserrat until 2000, where the Tremors finished second to last above the Seventh Day Adventists Trendsetters. They have been runners-up in the Montserrat Championship in 2004 and 2017. The club's anthem is Volcano by Jimmy Buffett, which was written about Soufrière Hills prior to the 1995 eruption.

== Honours ==
Montserrat Championship:

- Winners: 1995
- Runners-up: 2004, 2017

== See also ==
- Soufrière Hills
