= Montserrat Secondary School =

Location
- Salem; Montserrat
- Coordinates: 16.7565°N 62.2181°W

Information
- Type: Secondary school
- Motto: Qui Non Proficit Deficit (He who does not progress, regresses.)
- Established: 1938
- Principal: Cheryln Hogan
- Enrollment: Approximately 340 (in 2016)
- Affiliation: Government of Montserrat

The Montserrat Secondary School, often referred to for short as MSS, is the only secondary school which also has students younger than 16, on the island of Montserrat. The school's campus is in Salem on the western coast of the island. Prior to 2004 it was responsible for Montserrat's sixth form education (post-16); currently Montserrat Community College (MCC) offers Caribbean Advanced Proficiency Examinations (CAPE) sixth-form classes.

== History ==
It was established by the 1938 merger of a government boys' secondary school, Montserrat Boys Grammar School and a private girls' secondary school. Originally not all Montserrat citizens had the right to a secondary education, and the school chose which students were admitted. A May 2011 Montserrat government report said that the school "produced excellent results and enjoyed national esteem" at the time. Wealthier families were the main clientele of MSS.

There were 64 students in 1941. In 1955 its senior/modern school opened and in 1971 its junior school opened. The May 2011 government report said that the new divisions "did not substantially alter the elitist nature of the school." The school has had multiple locations before settling in Salem. In 1986 secondary education became universal in Montserrat, and the report said that as well as the 1997 Soufrière Hills volcanic eruption, which reduced the student population altered the school's culture. As a result of the establishment of universal secondary education, MSS established three branch junior school campuses in Dagenham, Salem, and Thompson Field.

In the pre-1997 period it was the sole school with upper secondary education, with its senior secondary division being the Montserrat Senior Secondary School, and its junior secondary being a lower section. The campuses together had 1,043 students in 1988.

The volcanic eruption and population loss resulted in the dissolution of MSS's sixth-form college; Montserrat Community College took over sixth-form studies after opening in 2004. The school has a single campus in Salem. By 2011 the teacher population had a lack of stability, contrasting with local-origin teachers of previous generations. In addition multiple "behavioral problems" had occurred "for several years". In 2011 there were 300 students; some of the school's students had English as a second language as they were immigrants.

== Campus ==
It occasionally closed during ash falls as it is in the volcano's ash shadow. A report from the UK Department for International Development (DFID) said that the school is a long distance from the major settlements in northern Montserrat.

== Principals of the Montserrat Secondary School, 1928 – present ==
- H. G. Carrington (1928–1957)
- Vincent Bennett Browne (1957–1968)
- Mr Holden
- Mr Hoppy
- Charles T. John (1976–1979)
- Peter White (1979–1990)
- Oeslyn Jemmotte (1990–1993)
- Lucy Fenton (1993–1995)
- Camela Watts (1995–1998)
- Kathleen Greenaway (1998–2004)
- Glen Francis (2004–2006)
- Alric Taylor (2006–2009)
- Cherlyn Hogan (2009–2020)
- Tony Allen (2020-2023)
- Cherlyn Hogan (2023–present)

== Notable alumni ==
- Arrow, a calypsonian and soca musician named Alphonsus Celestine Edmund Cassell, who is regarded as the first superstar of soca from Montserrat
- Donaldson Romeo, the second Premier of Montserrat
- Sheree Jemmotte-Rodney, the current acting Attorney General of Montserrat

== See also ==
- Education in Montserrat
