= Blakes Estate Stadium =

Football stadium in Montserrat

Coordinates: 16.783865°N 62.186141°W

Blakes Estate Stadium, is a football stadium in Montserrat, near the village of Lookout. The stadium holds 1,000. On 2 April 2002, the officially named MFA Inc. Complex was completed using FIFA funds.

== Tenants ==
Blakes Estate Stadium has several tenants and many of the teams in the Montserrat Championship use it for their league games. Ideal SC, Royal Montserrat Police Force and Montserrat Volcano Observatory Tremors are among those tenants. Many of the domestic league games at the Blakes Estate Stadium took place in front of dozens of spectators. The Montserrat national football team play their international home fixtures at the Blakes Estate Stadium as well. They sometimes play in front of crowds of at least 500 at the Blakes Estate Stadium.
