= Ideal SC =

Association football club in Montserrat

- Full name: Ideal Sports Club
- Founded: 15 January 1975; 50 years ago
- Ground: Blakes Estate Stadium
- Capacity: 1,000
- League: Montserrat Championship

Ideal Sports Club is a Montserrat sports club based in Brades. Ideal SC is best known for their football section, who plays in the Montserrat Championship, the highest tier of football on the island. The football club won the championship in 2004.

== History ==
Ideal was founded in Brades, Montserrat in 1975. The first record of them competing in national football was in 1996-97 Montserrat Championship, known as the Carib Football League for sponsorship reasons, under the name Ideal Boys. Only one result is recorded, a 4–3 victory over the Seventh Day Adventists Trendsetters, before the season was cancelled when the Soufrière Hills erupted causing widespread devastation to the island.

The following season was cancelled as a result of the eruption, but Ideal Boys returned in 2000, finishing as runners up in the four team competition to winners Royal Montserrat Police Force, winning four and drawing one of their seven games (the final round apparently cancelled since no result could affect the final standings).

The 2001 season was a repeat of 2000, with Ideal Boys again finishing in second place to the Royal Montserrat Police Force, this time in a five team league, winning five and drawing one of their matches.

Changing their name firstly to Ideal Printers and then to Ideal SC, the club completed a hat-trick of second-place finishes, again finishing as runners up to the police team, this time on goal difference in a competition played as a single round-robin contest between the four competing clubs.

Ideal finally won a national championship in the 2004 season, the last national competition before the league paused between 2005 and 2015. Their victory gained them entry to the 2004 CFU Club Championship, though their performance was not successful. Despite both legs of their qualifying round being played on Montserrat, they lost 1–15 and 0–15 to Jamaican team Harbour View, the eventual winners of the Caribbean qualifying competition, with Jaafar Munroe scoring their only goal in the first leg.

== Honours ==
Montserrat Championship

- Winners: 2004
- Runners up: 2000, 2001, 2002–03

== Ground ==
Ideal SC plays their home games at Blakes Estate Stadium near the small village of Look Out. The ground has a capacity for 1,000 and is also home to the Montserrat National Team. Prior to moving there in 2002, they played at Salem Oval which also was used for cricket and held A-Class cricket games.
