= List of football clubs in Haiti =

== Clubs by division ==
=== Championnat National D1 ===
Clubs participating in 2015 season:

Short name	Full name	City	Department	Stadium
Aigle Noir AC	Aigle Noir Athlétic Club	Port-au-Prince	Ouest	Stade Sylvio Cator
America FC	America Football Club des Cayes	Les Cayes	Sud	Parc Mister Henry
Baltimore SC	Baltimore Sportif Club	Saint-Marc	Artibonite	Parc Levelt
AS Capoise	Association Sportive Capoise	Cap-Haïtien	Nord	Parc Saint-Victor
Cavaly AS	Cavaly Association Sportive	Léogâne	Ouest	Parc Julia Vilbon
Don Bosco FC	Don Bosco Football Club de Pétion-Ville	Pétion-Ville	Ouest	Parc Sainte-Thérèse
FICA	Football Inter Club Association	Cap-Haïtien	Nord	Parc Saint-Victor
Inter GG	Inter de Grand-Goâve	Grand-Goâve	Ouest	Parc Ferrus
AS Mirebalais	Association Sportive Mirebalais	Mirebalais	Centre	Centre Sportif Bayas
Ouanaminthe FC	Ouanaminthe Football Club	Ouanaminthe	Nord-Est	Parc Notre Dame
Petit-Goâve FC	Petit-Goâve Football Club	Petit-Goâve	Ouest	Parc Anglade
PNH FC	Police Nationale d'Haïti Football Club	Port-au-Prince	Ouest	Stade Sylvio Cator
Racine FC	Racine Football Club de Gros-Morne	Gros-Morne	Artibonite	Parc Roland Abdallah
Racing CH	Racing Club Haïtien	Port-au-Prince	Ouest	Stade Sylvio Cator
Racing FC	Racing Football Club des Gônaïves	Gonaïves	Artibonite	Parc Stenio Vincent
Roulado FC	Roulado Football Club de la Gonâve	La Gonâve	Ouest	Parc Savil Dessaint
Tempête FC	Tempête Football Club	Saint-Marc	Artibonite	Parc Levelt
US Lajeune	Union Sportive Lajeune de Pignon	Pignon	Nord	Parc Saint Joseph
Valencia FC	Valencia Football Club	Léogâne	Ouest	Parc Hendrick
Violette AC	Violette Athletic Club	Port-au-Prince	Ouest	Stade Sylvio Cator

=== Championnat National D2 ===
Clubs participating in 2015 season:

=== Nord 1 ===
- AS Borel
- AS Cange
- AS Rivartibonitienne ("ASR")
- AS Verrettes
- AS Villard
- JS Rivartibotienne ("JSR")
- Panthère Noire (Liancourt)
- Triomphe de Liancourt
- Vision de Hinche
- US Papaye

=== Nord 2 ===
- Accolade GM (Gros-Morne)
- AS Dessalines
- AS l'Estère
- AS Saint-Louis du Nord ("ASSL")
- AS Trou du Nord
- Éclair AC (Gonaïves)
- FC Raymond (Jean-Rabel)
- Limbé FC
- Port-de-Paix FC
- Real du Cap

=== Sud 1 ===
- Akolad FN (Fonds-des-Nègres)
- AS Aquin
- AS Grand-Goâve ("ASGG")
- AS Vieux Bourg d'Aquin ("ASVA")
- Éclair PG (Petit-Goâve)
- FC Juventus des Cayes
- Ouragan FC (Les Cayes)
- Rangers de Miragoâne
- US Dufort

=== Sud 2 ===
- ACADAFOOT
- Amateur CS (Cité Soleil)
- Barcelone FC (Carrefour)
- Club Sportif Saint-Louis
- EXAFOOT
- Lascahobas FC
- Lionceaux FC (Pernier)
- Roulado SM (Sources-Matelas)
- US Arcahaie
- Ynion CS (Cité Soleil)

=== Championnat National D3 ===
- AS Fort-Liberté
- AS Limonade
- Bacardi FC
- Cathorine Flon FC
- Dynamite AC (Saint-Marc)
- Jeunesse Capoise
- La Relève FC (Jérémie)
- Milan FC
- US Frères (Pétion-Ville)
- Zénith FC (Cap-Haïtien)

=== Unknown status ===
- AS Carrefour (Carrefour)
- Victory SC (Port-au-Prince) [served 2014 1-yr suspension; refused to register 2015–present]

== See also ==
- Haitian Football Federation
- Ligue Haïtienne
