= 2017 Ligue Haïtienne season =

Ligue Haïtienne
- Season: 2017
- Champions: Ouverture: Real Hope FA; Clôture: AS Capoise
- Relegated: Éclair AC; America FC; Juventus
- 2018 CFU Club Championship: Real Hope FA; Racing FC

The 2017 Ligue Haïtienne season is the 54th season of top-tier football in Haiti. It began on 4 March 2017. The league is split into two tournaments—the Série d'Ouverture and the Série de Clôture—each with identical formats and each contested by the same 16 teams.

In a change from last year, the number of teams in the league has been reduced from 18 to 16. Also, the playoffs for both seasons have been changed, having 6 teams qualify with seeds 3 through 6 starting in the quarterfinals and the 1 and 2 seeds starting in the semifinals.

== Teams ==
Locations of the 2017 Ligue Haïtienne season teams

At the end of the 2016 season, the bottom 4 teams in the aggregate table; Aigle Noir AC, Roulado FC, Inter, and Violette AC; were relegated to the Haitian second-level leagues. Replacing them were two clubs from the Haitian second-level leagues; Éclair AC and AS Sud-Est.

Réal du Cap has changed its name to Real Hope FA.

Club	City	Stadium
America FC	Les Cayes, Sud	Parc Mister Henry
Baltimore SC	Saint-Marc, Artibonite	Parc Levelt
AS Capoise	Cap-Haïtien, Nord	Parc Saint-Victor
Cavaly AS	Léogâne, Ouest	Parc Julia Vilbon
Don Bosco FC	Pétion-Ville, Ouest	Parc Sainte-Thérèse
Éclair AC	Gonaïves, Artibonite	Parc Vincent
FICA	Cap-Haïtien, Nord	Parc Saint-Victor
Juventus	Les Cayes, Sud	Parc Larco
AS Mirebalais	Mirebalais, Centre	Centre Sportif Bayas
Ouanaminthe FC	Ouanaminthe, Nord-Est	Parc Notre Dame
Petit-Goâve FC	Petit-Goâve, Ouest	Parc Anglade
Racing Club Haïtien	Port-au-Prince, Ouest	Stade Sylvio Cator
Racing FC	Gonaïves, Artibonite	Parc Stenio Vincent
Real Hope FA	Cap-Haïtien, Nord	
AS Sud-Est	Jacmel, Sud-Est	Parc Pinchinat de Jacmel
Tempête FC	Saint-Marc, Artibonite	Parc Levelt

== Série d'Ouverture ==
Ligue Haïtienne Série d'Ouverture
- Season: 2017
- Champions: Real Hope FA (1st title)
- Matches: 120
- Goals: 208 (1.73 per match)
- Biggest home win: Ouanaminthe FC 4-0 Real Hope FA; Don Bosco FC 5-1 Éclair AC; Real Hope FA 4-0 Petit-Goâve FC
- Biggest away win: Tempête FC 0-3 AS Sud-Est; Don Bosco FC 0-3 Racing Club Haïtien
- Highest scoring: Don Bosco FC 5-1 Éclair AC

The 2017 Série d'Ouverture began on 4 March 2017 and ended on 25 June 2017.

=== Regular season ===
==== Standings ====
Pos	Team	Pld	W	D	L	GF	GA	GD	Pts	Qualification
1	Real Hope FA	15	8	4	3	16	8	+8	28	Qualification to the Semifinals
2	Racing FC	15	8	4	3	17	11	+6	28	Qualification to the Semifinals
3	AS Sud-Est	15	6	7	2	15	8	+7	25	Qualification to the Quarterfinals
4	FICA	15	6	6	3	11	7	+4	24	Qualification to the Quarterfinals
5	AS Mirebalais	15	6	6	3	11	8	+3	24	Qualification to the Quarterfinals
6	Racing Club Haïtien	15	5	6	4	15	12	+3	21	Qualification to the Quarterfinals
7	Tempête FC	15	5	6	4	16	15	+1	21	
8	Juventus	15	5	5	5	14	16	−2	20	
9	Petit-Goâve FC	15	6	2	7	9	14	−5	20	
10	Ouanaminthe FC	15	5	4	6	14	13	+1	19	
11	Baltimore SC	15	4	7	4	10	10	0	19	
12	Don Bosco FC	15	4	4	7	18	17	+1	16	
13	Cavaly AS	15	4	4	7	13	17	−4	16	
14	America FC	15	4	4	7	11	18	−7	16	
15	Éclair AC	15	3	4	8	10	19	−9	13	
16	AS Capoise	15	3	3	9	8	15	−7	12	

Source: Soccerway
Rules for classification: 1) points; 2) goal difference; 3) number of goals scored.

==== Results ====
Home \ Away	AME	BAL	CAP	CAV	DBO	ÉCL	FICA	JUV	MIR	OUA	PGO	RCH	RFC	RHP	SDE	TEM
America FC			2–1	2–1	2–1		1–1	1–2					0–1			1–0
Baltimore SC	3–0		1–0	0–0	0–0		0–0	2–1								1–1
AS Capoise					1–0	1–0	0–1		1–1	1–1		1–0	0–0			1–2
Cavaly AS			1–0					2–0		3–1	0–1			0–0	0–1	2–2
Don Bosco FC				2–0		5–1			1–1	1–1	2–1	0–3	3–0			1–2
Éclair AC	2–0	0–0		1–2						1–0			0–1	0–0	2–2	1–1
Football Inter Club Association				1–0	1–0	3–1			0–0		0–0	1–0			0–0	
Juventus			2–1		1–1	0–1	3–2		1–1	1–0	1–0				0–0	
AS Mirebalais	1–0	0–0		1–0		2–0					1–0	0–1		1–0		
Ouanaminthe FC	0–0	1–0					1–0		1–0				1–1	4–0	1–0	
Petit-Goâve FC	1–0	0–1	1–0			1–0				2–1		0–0	2–0			
Racing Club Haïtien	1–1	1–1		1–1		1–0		2–1		1–0			1–1		1–1	
Racing FC		2–1		4–1			0–1	2–0	3–1					1–0		1–0
Real Hope FA	2–0	2–0	2–0		1–0		1–0	0–0			4–0	2–1				
AS Sud-Est	1–1	2–0	1–0		2–1				0–1		1–0		0–0	1–1		
Tempête FC							0–0	1–1	0–0	2–1	3–0	2–1		0–1	0–3	

Source: Soccerway
Legend: Blue = home team win; Yellow = draw; Red = away team win.

=== Playoffs ===
Quarterfinals
4	FICA	2	2	4
5	AS Mirebalais	1	1	2
3	AS Sud-Est	2	1	3
6	Racing Club Haïtien	0	0	0

Semifinals
1	Real Hope FA	1	0	1 (a)
4	FICA	1	0	1
2	Racing FC	0	1	1 (8)
3	AS Sud-Est	1	0	1 (7)

Final
1	Real Hope FA	1	1	2 (a)
2	Racing FC	2	0	2

==== Quarterfinals ====
Team 1	Agg.	Team 2	1st leg	2nd leg
AS Mirebalais	2–4	FICA	1–2	1–2
Racing Club Haïtien	0–3	AS Sud-Est	0–2	0–1

==== Semifinals ====
Team 1	Agg.	Team 2	1st leg	2nd leg
FICA	1–1 (a)	Real Hope FA	1–1	0–0
AS Sud-Est	1–1; 7-8 (p)	Racing FC	1–0	0–1

==== Finals ====
Team 1	Agg.	Team 2	1st leg	2nd leg
Racing FC	2–2 (a)	Real Hope FA	2–1	0–1

2017 Série d'Ouverture champions

1st title

== Série de Clôture ==
Ligue Haïtienne Série de Clôture
- Season: 2017
- Champions: AS Capoise (2nd title)
- Matches: 119
- Goals: 207 (1.74 per match)
- Biggest home win: AS Mirebalais 5-1 AS Sud-Est
- Biggest away win: Éclair AC 0-3 AS Mirebalais
- Highest scoring: Real Hope FA 3-3 Éclair AC; AS Mirebalais 5-1 AS Sud-Est

The 2017 Série de Clôture began on 13 September 2017 and ended on 24 December 2017.

=== Regular season ===
==== Standings ====
Pos	Team	Pld	W	D	L	GF	GA	GD	Pts	Qualification
1	AS Mirebalais	15	9	4	2	28	10	+18	31	Qualification to the Semifinals
2	Don Bosco FC	15	8	5	2	18	7	+11	29	Qualification to the Semifinals
3	Real Hope FA	15	7	6	2	15	8	+7	27	Qualification to the Quarterfinals
4	Racing FC	14	7	3	4	15	7	+8	24	Qualification to the Quarterfinals
5	FICA	15	5	9	1	10	6	+4	24	Qualification to the Quarterfinals
6	AS Capoise	15	6	4	5	16	17	−1	22	Qualification to the Quarterfinals
7	Éclair AC	15	5	5	5	15	13	+2	20	
8	Baltimore SC	15	5	5	5	10	9	+1	20	
9	Cavaly AS	15	4	6	5	13	14	−1	18	
10	Racing Club Haïtien	15	4	5	6	7	12	−5	17	
11	Petit-Goâve FC	15	4	4	7	12	13	−1	16	
12	Tempête FC	15	3	7	5	10	13	−3	16	
13	Ouanaminthe FC	15	4	4	7	12	18	−6	16	
14	America FC	15	4	4	7	14	22	−8	16	
15	AS Sud-Est	15	3	3	9	7	21	−14	12	
16	Juventus	14	2	4	8	5	17	−12	10	

Source: Soccerway
Rules for classification: 1) points; 2) goal difference; 3) number of goals scored.

==== Results ====
Home \ Away	AME	BAL	CAP	CAV	DBO	ÉCL	FICA	JUV	MIR	OUA	PGO	RCH	RFC	RHP	SDE	TEM
America FC		0–1				2–2			2–2	2–1	2–1	1–0		1–3	1–0	
Baltimore SC						0–0			0–0	1–0	1–0	0–1	1–0	0–1	3–1	
AS Capoise	3–0	1–0		1–0				1–0			3–0			1–1	1–0	
Cavaly AS	3–1	2–2			1–1	1–0	1–0		1–1			3–1	0–2			
Don Bosco FC	0–0	1–1	3–1				0–0	3–0						2–1	2–0	
Éclair AC			3–0		0–1		0–0	2–1	0–3		0–0	2–0				
Football Inter Club Association	1–0	1–0	0–0					1–0		2–1			1–1	1–0		0–0
Juventus	1–0	0–0		2–1								0–0	N/P	0–0		1–1
AS Mirebalais			4–1		1–0		1–1	3–0		3–0			2–1		5–1	1–0
Ouanaminthe FC			2–2	0–0	1–3	1–0		2–0			2–1	1–0				1–1
Petit-Goâve FC				0–0	0–0		1–1	2–0	2–0					0–1	2–0	3–0
Racing Club Haïtien			0–0		0–1		0–0		0–2		1–0			0–0		2–1
Racing FC	2–0		1–0		1–0	0–2				2–0	2–0	0–1			3–0	
Real Hope FA				2–0		3–3			1–0	0–0			0–0		1–0	1–0
AS Sud-Est				1–0		0–1	1–1	1–0		1–0		1–1				0–0
Tempête FC	2–2	1–0	3–1	0–0	0–1	1–0							0–0			

Source: Soccerway
Legend: Blue = home team win; Yellow = draw; Red = away team win.

=== Playoffs ===
Quarterfinals
4	Racing FC	1	2	3
5	FICA	1	1	2
3	Real Hope FA	0	0	0
6	AS Capoise	0	1	1

Semifinals
1	AS Mirebalais	0	1	1
4	Racing FC	1	0	1
2	Don Bosco FC	0	1	1
6	AS Capoise	1	2	3

Final
4	Racing FC	0	1	1
6	AS Capoise	1	3	4

==== Quarterfinals ====
Team 1	Agg.	Team 2	1st leg	2nd leg
FICA	2–3	Racing FC	1–1	1–2
AS Capoise	1–0	Real Hope FA	0–0	1–0

==== Semifinals ====
Team 1	Agg.	Team 2	1st leg	2nd leg
Racing FC	1–1	AS Mirebalais	1–0	0–1
AS Capoise	3–1	Don Bosco FC	1–0	2–1

The second leg between AS Mirebalais and Racing FC was abandoned in injury time due to an attack on the referee. The 1–0 scoreline at the time was allowed to stand and a playoff between the sides would determine who advanced to the finals. Racing FC won the playoff 2-0 and advanced to the final.

==== Finals ====
Team 1	Agg.	Team 2	1st leg	2nd leg
AS Capoise	4–1	Racing FC	1–0	3–1

2017 Série de Clôture Champions

2nd title

== Trophée des Champions ==
This match is contested between the winner of the Série d'Ouverture and the winner of the Série de Clôture.

Team 1	Score	Team 2
Real Hope FA	1–2	AS Capoise

== Aggregate table ==
Pos	Team	Pld	W	D	L	GF	GA	GD	Pts	Qualification or relegation
1	AS Mirebalais	30	15	10	5	39	18	+21	55	
2	Real Hope FA	30	15	10	5	31	16	+15	55	Qualification for 2018 CFU Club Championship
3	Racing FC	29	15	7	7	32	18	+14	52	Qualification for 2018 CFU Club Championship (Note: Racing FC qualified for the 2018 CFU Club Championship as the runners-up of the Série d'Ouverture tournament.)
4	FICA	30	11	15	4	21	13	+8	48	
5	Don Bosco FC	30	12	9	9	36	24	+12	45	
6	Baltimore SC	30	9	12	9	20	19	+1	39	
7	Racing Club Haïtien	30	9	11	10	22	24	−2	38	
8	Tempête FC	30	8	13	9	26	28	−2	37	
9	AS Sud-Est	30	9	10	11	22	29	−7	37	
10	Petit-Goâve FC	30	10	6	14	21	27	−6	36	
11	Ouanaminthe FC	30	9	8	13	26	31	−5	35	
12	Cavaly AS	30	8	10	12	26	31	−5	34	
13	AS Capoise	30	9	7	14	24	32	−8	34	
14	Éclair AC	30	8	9	13	25	32	−7	33	Relegation to 2018 Championnat National D2
15	America FC	30	8	8	14	25	40	−15	32	Relegation to 2018 Championnat National D2
16	Juventus	29	7	9	13	19	33	−14	30	Relegation to 2018 Championnat National D2

Source: RSSSF
Rules for classification: 1) points; 2) goal difference; 3) number of goals scored.
