= 2018 Ligue Haïtienne season =

Ligue Haïtienne
- Season: 2018
- Champions: Ouverture: AS Capoise; Clôture: Don Bosco
- 2019 CFU Club Championship: AS Capoise; Don Bosco

The 2018 Ligue Haïtienne season is the 55th season of top-tier football in Haiti. It began on 17 February 2018 and ended on 27 December 2018. The league Championnat National Haïtien Professionnel is split into two tournaments—the Série d'Ouverture and the Série de Clôture—each with identical formats and each contested by the same 16 teams.

== Teams ==
Locations of the 2018 Ligue Haïtienne season teams

At the end of the 2017 season, the bottom three teams in the aggregate table; Éclair AC, America FC, and Juventus; were relegated to the Haitian second-level leagues. Replacing them were three clubs from the Haitian second-level leagues; Arcahaie FC, Valencia FC, and Cosmopolites SC.

Club	City	Stadium
Arcahaie FC	Arcahaie, Ouest	Parc National du Drapeau
Baltimore SC	Saint-Marc, Artibonite	Parc Levelt
AS Capoise	Cap-Haïtien, Nord	Parc Saint-Victor
Cavaly AS	Léogâne, Ouest	Parc Julia Vilbon
Cosmopolites SC	Delmas, Ouest	
Don Bosco FC	Pétion-Ville, Ouest	Parc Sainte-Thérèse
FICA	Cap-Haïtien, Nord	Parc Saint-Victor
AS Mirebalais	Mirebalais, Centre	Centre Sportif Bayas
Ouanaminthe FC	Ouanaminthe, Nord-Est	Parc Notre Dame
Petit-Goâve FC	Petit-Goâve, Ouest	Parc Anglade
Racing Club Haïtien	Port-au-Prince, Ouest	Stade Sylvio Cator
Racing FC	Gonaïves, Artibonite	Parc Stenio Vincent
Real Hope FA	Cap-Haïtien, Nord	
AS Sud-Est	Jacmel, Sud-Est	Parc Pinchinat de Jacmel
Tempête FC	Saint-Marc, Artibonite	Parc Levelt
Valencia FC	Léogâne, Ouest	Parc Indrich de Four

== Série d'Ouverture ==
Ligue Haïtienne Série d'Ouverture
- Season: 2018
- Champions: AS Capoise (3rd title)
- Matches: 120
- Goals: 218 (1.82 per match)
- Biggest home win: Racing FC 5-0 Petit-Goâve FC
- Biggest away win: Racing FC 0-3 Cosmopolites SC; AS Capoise 0-3 AS Mirebalais; Cavaly AS 1-4 Don Bosco FC; Valencia FC 0-3 Cavaly AS; Racing FC 0-3 Tempête FC
- Highest scoring: AS Capoise 4-2 Cosmopolites SC

The 2018 Série d'Ouverture began on 17 February 2018 and the regular season ended on 6 May 2018. The playoffs began on 9 May 2018 and ended on 27 May 2018.

=== Regular season ===
==== Standings ====
Pos	Team	Pld	W	D	L	GF	GA	GD	Pts	Qualification
1	AS Capoise	15	10	4	1	24	10	+14	34	Qualification to the Semifinals
2	AS Mirebalais	15	7	6	2	19	6	+13	27	Qualification to the Semifinals
3	Tempête FC	15	6	6	3	16	10	+6	24	Qualification to the Quarterfinals
4	Don Bosco FC	15	5	7	3	18	14	+4	22	Qualification to the Quarterfinals
5	Baltimore SC	15	6	4	5	10	13	−3	22	Qualification to the Quarterfinals
6	Real Hope FA	15	5	6	4	12	10	+2	21	Qualification to the Quarterfinals
7	FICA	15	5	5	5	14	14	0	20	
8	Cavaly AS	15	5	4	6	15	14	+1	19	
9	Ouanaminthe FC	15	4	7	4	11	13	−2	19	
10	Valencia FC	15	5	4	6	10	17	−7	19	
11	Racing Club Haïtien	15	4	6	5	12	11	+1	18	
12	Petit-Goâve FC	15	3	7	5	10	16	−6	16	
13	Arcahaie FC	15	4	4	7	9	16	−7	16	
14	Racing FC	15	2	8	5	13	14	−1	14	
15	Cosmopolites SC	15	4	2	9	13	19	−6	14	
16	AS Sud-Est	15	4	2	9	12	21	−9	14	

Source: RSSSF
Rules for classification: 1) points; 2) goal difference; 3) number of goals scored.

==== Results ====
Home \ Away	ARC	BAL	CAP	CAV	COS	DBO	FICA	MIR	OUA	PGO	RCH	RFC	RHP	SDE	TEM	VAL
Arcahaie FC		1–0		0–1	0–1			0–2		1–0		0–0			1–1	
Baltimore SC				2–1		0–0	1–2		1–0	2–1	1–0				0–0	0–2
AS Capoise	1–0	2–0		1–0	4–2			0–3	0–0					2–0		4–0
Cavaly AS					3–0	1–4	0–0	0–0			1–1	1–1	1–0	2–1		
Cosmopolites SC		0–1				1–2	1–2			0–1	0–1		2–1			0–0
Don Bosco FC	1–2		1–1				2–2	2–1	1–1					1–0	3–0	
Football Inter Club Association	3–0		0–1						0–1		1–0	1–0	1–1		0–0	
AS Mirebalais		3–0			1–1		2–0			1–1	1–0			3–0 (Note: AS Mirebalais v AS Sud-Est was abandoned at halftime due to rain with the score at 2-0 and was scheduled to be resumed the next day. However, the AS Sud-Est team did not appear for the resumption. Therefore, the match was awarded 3-0 to AS Mirebalais.)	0–0	
Ouanaminthe FC	1–1			1–0	0–1			1–0		0–0		0–0	0–1			2–1
Petit-Goâve FC			1–2	1–0		0–0	2–2				0–2			2–0	0–0	0–0
Racing Club Haïtien	1–1		2–2			1–1			1–0			0–0	0–1		1–0	
Racing FC		1–1	0–0		0–3	3–0 (Note: Racing FC v Don Bosco FC was abandoned in the 16th minutes. Racing FC were awarded a 3-0 win.)		1–2		5–0					0–3 (Note: Racing FC v Tempête FC was abandoned after the 90th minute due to crowd trouble with the score at 0-0. The match was awarded a 0-3 result.)	1–1
Real Hope FA	2–0	0–0	1–3			0–0		0–0		1–1		1–0				2–0
AS Sud-Est	0–1	0–1			2–1		2–0		4–1		1–0	1–1	1–1			
Tempête FC			0–1	2–1	1–0				2–2				1–0	4–0		2–1
Valencia FC	2–1			0–3 (Note: Valencia FC v Cavaly AS was abandoned in the 90+1st minute due to a pitch invasion with the score at 0-3. This score was allowed to stand as the match result.)		1–0	1–0	0–0			0–2			1–0		

Source: RSSSF
Legend: Blue = home team win; Yellow = draw; Red = away team win.

=== Playoffs ===
Quarterfinals
4	Don Bosco FC	0	0	0
5	Baltimore SC	1	0	1
3	Tempête FC	1	2	3
6	Real Hope FA	2	0	2

Semifinals
1	AS Capoise	0	1	1
5	Baltimore SC	0	0	0
2	AS Mirebalais	1	2	3
3	Tempête FC	1	0	1

Final
1	AS Capoise	0	1	1
2	AS Mirebalais	0	0	0

==== Quarterfinals ====
The first legs were played on 9 and 10 May and the second legs were played on 13 May.

Team 1	Agg.	Team 2	1st leg	2nd leg
Real Hope FA	2–3	Tempête FC	2–1	0–2
Baltimore SC	1–0	Don Bosco FC	1–0	0–0

==== Semifinals ====
The first legs were played on 16 and 17 May and the second legs were played on 20 May.

Team 1	Agg.	Team 2	1st leg	2nd leg
Baltimore SC	0–1	AS Capoise	0–0	0–1
Tempête FC	1–3	AS Mirebalais	1–1	0–2

==== Finals ====
The first leg was played on 24 May and the second leg was played on 27 May.

Team 1	Agg.	Team 2	1st leg	2nd leg
AS Mirebalais	0–1	AS Capoise	0–0	0–1

2018 Série d'Ouverture champions

3rd title

== Série de Clôture ==
Ligue Haïtienne Série de Clôture
- Season: 2018
- Champions: Don Bosco FC (5th title)
- Matches: 120
- Goals: 214 (1.78 per match)
- Biggest home win: Real Hope FA 6-1 Cosmopolites SC; Racing Club Haïtien 5-0 Cosmopolites SC; FICA 5-0 AS Sud-Est
- Biggest away win: Valencia FC 0-3 Petit-Goâve FC
- Highest scoring: Real Hope FA 6-1 Cosmopolites SC; Don Bosco FC 4-3 Cavaly AS

The 2018 Série de Clôture began on 1 September 2018 and the regular season ended on 11 December 2018. The playoffs began on 6 December 2018 and ended on 27 December 2018.

=== Regular season ===
==== Standings ====
Pos	Team	Pld	W	D	L	GF	GA	GD	Pts	Qualification
1	Arcahaie FC	15	11	2	2	16	6	+10	35	Qualification to the Semifinals
2	Tempête FC	15	6	6	3	12	7	+5	24	Qualification to the Semifinals
3	Don Bosco FC	15	7	3	5	20	18	+2	24	Qualification to the Quarterfinals
4	FICA	15	7	2	6	20	13	+7	23	Qualification to the Quarterfinals
5	Real Hope FA	15	6	5	4	17	11	+6	23	Qualification to the Quarterfinals
6	Baltimore SC	15	7	1	7	11	11	0	22	Qualification to the Quarterfinals
7	Cosmopolites SC	15	6	4	5	11	19	−8	22	
8	Ouanaminthe FC	15	5	6	4	10	8	+2	21	
9	AS Mirebalais	15	6	3	6	11	12	−1	21	
10	Racing Club Haïtien	15	5	5	5	16	12	+4	20	
11	Cavaly AS	15	5	5	5	16	14	+2	20	
12	Racing FC	15	6	1	8	13	11	+2	19	
13	AS Capoise	15	5	3	7	12	16	−4	18	
14	AS Sud-Est	15	5	3	7	16	22	−6	18	
15	Valencia FC	15	3	4	8	7	17	−10	13	
16	Petit-Goâve FC	15	2	3	10	6	17	−11	9	

Source: RSSSF
Rules for classification: 1) points; 2) goal difference; 3) number of goals scored.

==== Results ====
Home \ Away	ARC	BAL	CAP	CAV	COS	DBO	FICA	MIR	OUA	PGO	RCH	RFC	RHP	SDE	TEM	VAL
Arcahaie FC			1–0			2–0	0–0		1–0		2–1		2–1	2–1		1–0
Baltimore SC	1–0		0–1		4–2			1–0				1–2	0–1	1–0		
AS Capoise						1–2	3–1			2–0	2–1	0–0	1–0		0–3 (Note: The match between AS Capoise and Tempete FC was abandoned at half time with the shoreline at 0-0 due to violence against the referee. The match was awarded to Tempete FC 0-3.)	
Cavaly AS	1–1	1–0	3–0						1–0	1–0					1–1	0–1
Cosmopolites SC	1–0		0–0	0–0				0–1	1–1			1–0		1–1	1–0	
Don Bosco FC		2–0		4–3	1–0					0–0	2–0	2–1	1–1			2–1
Football Inter Club Association		1–0		1–0	0–1	2–1		3–0		2–0				5–0		2–1
AS Mirebalais	0–1		1–0	2–1		2–1			0–0			2–0	1–2			0–0
Ouanaminthe FC		0–0	2–1			2–0	1–0				0–0			2–0	0–0	
Petit-Goâve FC	0–1	0–1			0–1			1–1	0–1			1–0	0–0			
Racing Club Haïtien		1–0		0–0	5–0		2–1	0–1		3–1				2–1		1–1
Racing FC	0–1			0–1			2–1		2–0		1–0 (Note: The original match between Racing FC and Racing Club Haïtien was abandoned at halftime due to a lack of security personnel. This match was replayed on 1 November with a final result of 1-0.)		2–0	2–0		
Real Hope FA				2–2	6–1		0–0		1–0		0–0			2–0	1–0	
AS Sud-Est			1–1	2–1		3–2		1–0		3–0					1–1	2–0
Tempête FC	0–1	2–1				0–0 (Note: The match between Tempête FC and Don Bosco FC was abandoned after 15 minutes due to heavy rain. The match was replayed on 31 October with a final result of 0-0.)	2–1	1–0		1–0	0–0	1–0				
Valencia FC		0–1 (Note: The match between Valencia FC and Baltimore SC was abandoned at halftime due to crowd trouble.The match was replayed on 8 November 2018 with a final result of 0-1.)	1–0		0–1				1–1	0–3 (Note: The match between Valencia FC and Petit-Goâve FC was abandoned in the 72nd minute with the scoreline at 0-1 due to crowd trouble. The match was awarded to Petit-Goâve FC 0-3.)		0–3 (Note: The match between Valencia FC and Racing FC was not played initially due to Racing FC's claim that their players had been attacked. The match was rescheduled for 11 December in Port-au-Prince, but Valencia did not appear for the match. This match was awarded to Racing FC 0-3.)	1–0		0–0	

Source: RSSSF
Legend: Blue = home team win; Yellow = draw; Red = away team win.

=== Playoffs ===
Quarterfinals
4	FICA	0	1	1
5	Real Hope FA	1	2	3
3	Don Bosco FC	1	1 (3)	2
6	Baltimore SC	1	1 (2)	2

Semifinals
1	Arcahaie FC	2	1	3
5	Real Hope FA	0	0	0
2	Tempête FC	0	1	1
3	Don Bosco FC	0	1	1 (a)

Final
1	Arcahaie FC	0	0	0 (5)
3	Don Bosco FC	0	0	0 (5)

==== Quarterfinals ====
The first legs were played on 6 December 2018 and the second legs were played on 9 December 2018.

Team 1	Agg.	Team 2	1st leg	2nd leg
Real Hope FA	3–1	FICA	1–0	2–1
Baltimore SC	1–1; 2–3 (p)	Don Bosco FC	1–1	1–1 (a.e.t.)

==== Semifinals ====
The first legs were played on 13 December 2018 and the second legs were played on 16 December 2018.

Team 1	Agg.	Team 2	1st leg	2nd leg
Real Hope FA	0–3	Arcahaie FC	0–2	0–1
Don Bosco FC	1–1 (a)	Tempête FC	0–0	1–1

==== Finals ====
The first leg was played on 20 December 2018 and the second leg was played on 23 December 2018.

Team 1	Agg.	Team 2	1st leg	2nd leg
Don Bosco FC	0–0; 5–5 (p)	Arcahaie FC	0–0	0–0 (a.e.t.)

The second match between Arcahaie FC and Don Bosco FC was called off due to darkness with the penalty shootout even at 5-5. Due to this, a playoff match was played on 27 December 2018 to determine a season champion.

Team 1	Score	Team 2
Arcahaie FC	1–2	Don Bosco FC

2018 Série de Clôture Champions

5th title

== Trophée des Champions ==
This match is contested between the winner of the Série d'Ouverture and the winner of the Série de Clôture. This match was played on 30 December 2018.

Team 1	Score	Team 2
AS Capoise	1–0	Don Bosco FC

== Aggregate table ==
Pos	Team	Pld	W	D	L	GF	GA	GD	Pts	Qualification or relegation
1	AS Capoise	30	15	7	8	36	26	+10	52	Qualification for 2019 CFU Club Championship
2	Arcahaie FC	30	15	6	9	25	22	+3	51	
3	AS Mirebalais	30	13	9	8	30	18	+12	48	
4	Tempête FC	30	12	12	6	28	17	+11	48	
5	Don Bosco FC	30	12	10	8	38	32	+6	46	Qualification for 2019 CFU Club Championship
6	Real Hope FA	30	11	11	8	29	21	+8	44	
7	Baltimore SC	30	13	5	12	21	24	−3	44	
8	FICA	30	12	7	11	34	27	+7	43	
9	Ouanaminthe FC	30	9	13	8	21	21	0	40	
10	Cavaly AS	30	10	9	11	31	28	+3	39	
11	Racing Club Haïtien	30	9	11	10	28	23	+5	38	
12	Cosmopolites SC	30	10	6	14	24	38	−14	36	
13	Racing FC	30	8	9	13	26	25	+1	33	
14	AS Sud-Est	30	9	5	16	28	43	−15	32	Relegation to 2018 Championnat National D2
15	Valencia FC	30	8	8	14	17	34	−17	32	Relegation to 2018 Championnat National D2
16	Petit-Goâve FC	30	5	10	15	16	33	−17	25	Relegation to 2018 Championnat National D2

Source: RSSSF
Rules for classification: 1) points; 2) goal difference; 3) number of goals scored.
