= 2016 Ligue Haïtienne season =

Ligue Haïtienne
- Season: 2016
- Champions: Ouverture: Racing FC; Clôture: FICA
- 2017 CFU Club Championship: Racing FC; Don Bosco FC

The 2016 Ligue Haïtienne season was the 53rd season of top-tier football in Haiti. It began on 21 February 2016. The league is split into two tournaments—the Série d'Ouverture and the Série de Clôture—each with identical formats and each contested by the same 18 teams.

In a change from last year, the number of teams in the league has been reduced from 20 to 18.

== Teams ==
At the end of the 2015 season, the bottom 4 teams in the aggregate table; Valencia, PNH, US Lajeune, and Racine FC; were relegated to the Haitian second level leagues. Replacing them were two clubs from the Haitian second level leagues; Réal du Cap and Juventus.

Club	City	Stadium
Aigle Noir AC	Port-au-Prince, Ouest	Stade Sylvio Cator
America FC	Les Cayes, Sud	Parc Mister Henry
Baltimore SC	Saint-Marc, Artibonite	Parc Levelt
AS Capoise	Cap-Haïtien, Nord	Parc Saint-Victor
Cavaly AS	Léogâne, Ouest	Parc Julia Vilbon
Don Bosco FC	Pétion-Ville, Ouest	Parc Sainte-Thérèse
FICA	Cap-Haïtien, Nord	Parc Saint-Victor
Inter	Grand-Goâve, Ouest	Parc Ferrus
Juventus	Les Cayes, Sud	
AS Mirebalais	Mirebalais, Centre	Centre Sportif Bayas
Ouanaminthe FC	Ouanaminthe, Nord-Est	Parc Notre Dame
Petit-Goâve FC	Petit-Goâve, Ouest	Parc Anglade
Racing Club Haïtien	Port-au-Prince, Ouest	Stade Sylvio Cator
Racing FC	Gonaïves, Artibonite	Parc Stenio Vincent
Réal du Cap	Cap-Haïtien, Nord	
Roulado FC	La Gonâve, Ouest	Parc Savil Dessaint
Tempête FC	Saint-Marc, Artibonite	Parc Levelt
Violette AC	Port-au-Prince, Ouest	Stade Sylvio Cator

== Série d'Ouverture ==
Ligue Haïtienne Série d'Ouverture
- Season: 2016
- Champions: Racing FC (3rd title)
- Matches: 153
- Goals: 245 (1.6 per match)
- Biggest home win: FICA 4-0 Violette AC; Racing Club Haïtien 4-0 Tempête FC
- Biggest away win: Roulado FC 0-3 Racing FC; Inter 0-3 Roulado FC
- Highest scoring: Racing FC 4-2 Ouanaminthe FC

The 2016 Série d'Ouverture began on 20 February 2016 and ended on 28 May 2016.

=== Regular season ===
==== Standings ====
Pos	Team	Pld	W	D	L	GF	GA	GD	Pts	Qualification
1	Racing FC	17	10	6	1	25	12	+13	36	Playoffs
2	Don Bosco FC	17	10	5	2	20	6	+14	35	Playoffs
3	FICA	17	8	6	3	19	9	+10	30	Playoffs
4	Cavaly AS	17	9	3	5	17	15	+2	30	Playoffs
5	AS Mirebalais	17	8	3	6	12	9	+3	27	
6	Ouanaminthe FC	17	8	2	7	17	14	+3	26	
7	AS Capoise	17	6	7	4	14	12	+2	25	
8	Petit-Goâve FC	17	6	7	4	14	14	0	25	
9	Tempête FC	17	6	6	5	12	14	−2	24	
10	Réal du Cap	17	5	8	4	11	10	+1	23	
11	Racing Club Haïtien	17	5	6	6	17	17	0	21	
12	Baltimore SC	17	5	6	6	11	12	−1	21	
13	Juventus	17	5	4	8	17	16	+1	19	
14	America FC	17	5	1	11	8	16	−8	16	
15	Roulado FC	17	3	6	8	13	22	−9	15	
16	Aigle Noir AC	17	2	8	7	10	18	−8	14	
17	Inter	17	2	8	7	5	13	−8	14	
18	Violette AC	17	0	8	9	3	16	−13	8	

Source: Soccerway
Rules for classification: 1) points; 2) goal difference; 3) number of goals scored.

==== Results ====
Home \ Away	AIN	AME	BAL	CAP	CAV	DBO	FICA	INT	JUV	MIR	OUA	PGO	RCH	RFC	RDC	ROU	TEM	VIO
Aigle Noir AC					0–2	0–0				0–2	0–1	2–0	2–2	1–1	0–0		0–1	
America FC	1–0		1–0				0–1	0–0	1–0					0–1	0–2	2–0		2–1
Baltimore SC	0–1						1–0	1–0	1–1			1–1		2–2		1–0		1–0
AS Capoise	2–1	2–0	1–1				0–0	1–1	1–0						0–0	1–0		1–0
Cavaly AS		1–0	1–0	1–1				1–0	2–1		0–1				1–0	3–2	1–0	
Don Bosco FC		2–1	2–1	1–0	3–0			2–0			1–0					4–1	2–0	
Football Inter Club Association	1–1				0–0	1–0				2–0		3–0	3–1	0–0	0–2			4–0
Inter	0–0						0–1		2–0			0–0	0–0	0–0		0–3		1–0
Juventus	1–1					0–1	3–0			3–0		2–0	3–1	2–1				0–0
AS Mirebalais		1–0	0–1	0–0	1–0	0–0		1–0			1–0						2–0	
Ouanaminthe FC		1–0	0–0	0–1			0–2	3–0	2–0						0–1	2–0		1–0
Petit-Goâve FC		2–0		0–0	3–1	0–0				1–0	1–0		2–0				1–1	
Racing Club Haïtien		1–0	1–0	3–1	1–2	0–0				1–0	1–2						4–0	
Racing FC				3–2	2–1	1–0				1–0	4–2	3–1	1–0		1–1		1–0	
Réal du Cap			0–0			0–1		0–0	1–0	0–2		1–1	1–1			1–1		
Roulado FC	4–1						1–1		2–1	0–0		0–1	0–0	0–3				1–0
Tempête FC		1–0	1–0	1–0			0–0	2–0	0–0		2–2				3–1	0–0		
Violette AC	0–0				0–0	1–1				0–2		0–0	1–1	0–0	0–1		0–0	

Source: Soccerway
Legend: Blue = home team win; Yellow = draw; Red = away team win.

=== Playoffs ===
==== Semifinals ====
Team 1	Agg.	Team 2	1st leg	2nd leg
FICA	4–0	Don Bosco FC	2–0	2–0
Cavaly AS	0–1	Racing FC	0–0	0–1

==== Finals ====
Team 1	Agg.	Team 2	1st leg	2nd leg
FICA	0–1	Racing FC	0–0	0–1

2016 Série d'Ouverture champions

3rd title

== Série de Clôture ==
Ligue Haïtienne Série de Clôture
- Season: 2016
- Matches: 153
- Goals: 258 (1.69 per match)
- Biggest home win: Juventus 7-1 Tempête FC
- Biggest away win: Petit-Goâve FC 0-3 Aigle Noir AC
- Highest scoring: Juventus 7-1 Tempête FC

The 2016 Série de Clôture began on 12 August 2016 and ended on 24 December 2016.

=== Regular season ===
==== Standings ====
Pos	Team	Pld	W	D	L	GF	GA	GD	Pts	Qualification
1	FICA	17	7	8	2	20	8	+12	29	Playoffs
2	Ouanaminthe FC	17	7	8	2	19	12	+7	29	Playoffs
3	Réal du Cap	17	7	6	4	21	13	+8	27	Playoffs
4	AS Capoise	17	8	3	6	11	11	0	27	Playoffs
5	America FC	17	6	7	4	13	7	+6	25	
6	Inter	17	7	3	7	15	17	−2	24	
7	Aigle Noir AC	17	4	11	2	14	9	+5	23	
8	Violette AC	17	4	9	4	14	12	+2	21	
9	Baltimore SC	17	4	9	4	12	12	0	21	
10	Racing FC	17	4	9	4	11	13	−2	21	
11	Petit-Goâve FC	17	6	3	8	10	17	−7	21	
12	AS Mirebalais	17	5	5	7	11	11	0	20	
13	Juventus	17	5	5	7	25	27	−2	20	
14	Don Bosco FC	17	4	8	5	12	15	−3	20	
15	Roulado FC	17	5	5	7	13	17	−4	20	
16	Cavaly AS	17	5	4	8	13	19	−6	19	
17	Racing Club Haïtien	17	4	6	7	16	18	−2	18	
18	Tempête FC	17	3	7	7	8	20	−12	16	

Source: Soccerway
Rules for classification: 1) points; 2) goal difference; 3) number of goals scored.

==== Results ====
Home \ Away	AIN	AME	BAL	CAP	CAV	DBO	FICA	INT	JUV	MIR	OUA	PGO	RCH	RFC	RDC	ROU	TEM	VIO
Aigle Noir AC		0–0	0–0	0–0			1–1	2–0	1–1							1–0		0–0
America FC				3–0	0–1	0–0				1–0	1–0	3–0	1–1				1–0	
Baltimore SC		0–0		1–0	2–0	3–2				0–0	1–1		0–0		1–0		0–1	
AS Capoise					2–1	1–0				1–0	0–0	2–1	1–0	1–1			1–0	
Cavaly AS	1–1					1–1	0–0			1–0		2–0	2–0	0–1				2–0
Don Bosco FC	1–2						0–0		2–1	0–0		2–1	1–1	2–1	0–0			0–0
Football Inter Club Association		0–0	3–1	0–1				4–0	4–2		0–0					3–0	0–0	
Inter		0–0	0–0	1–0	3–0	2–0				3–1	3–0				2–1		1–0	
Juventus		2–3	2–1	1–0	1–1			1–0			1–1				2–3	1–0	7–1	
AS Mirebalais	1–1						0–1		2–0			0–0	3–0	1–0	0–1	0–0		2–1
Ouanaminthe FC	1–1				2–1	2–0				1–0		1–0	2–0	1–0			4–1	
Petit-Goâve FC	0–3		1–0				1–0	1–0	2–0					0–1	1–0	1–1		0–0
Racing Club Haïtien	1–0						0–1	2–0	4–1			0–1		1–1	2–3	3–0		1–1
Racing FC	1–0	0–0	1–1				1–1	0–0	1–1							1–0		0–0
Réal du Cap	0–0	1–0		0–1	4–0		0–0				1–1			4–1			0–0	2–1
Roulado FC		1–0	1–1	1–0	1–0	0–1		3–0			1–1				1–1		3–0	
Tempête FC	1–1				1–0	0–0				0–1		2–0	0–0	0–0				1–1
Violette AC		1–0	0–0	1–0			1–2	2–0	1–1		1–1					3–0		

Source: Soccerway
Legend: Blue = home team win; Yellow = draw; Red = away team win.

=== Playoffs ===
==== Semifinals ====
Team 1	Agg.	Team 2	1st leg	2nd leg
AS Capoise	0–1	FICA	0–0	0–1 (aet)
Réal du Cap	6–2	Ouanaminthe FC	3–1	3–1

==== Finals ====
Team 1	Agg.	Team 2	1st leg	2nd leg
Réal du Cap	0–2	FICA	0–0	0–2

2016 Série de Clôture Champions

8th title

== Trophée des Champions ==
This match is contested between the winner of the Série d'Ouverture and the winner of the Série de Clôture.

Team 1	Score	Team 2
Racing FC	1–0	FICA

== Aggregate table ==
Pos	Team	Pld	W	D	L	GF	GA	GD	Pts	Qualification or relegation
1	FICA	34	15	14	5	39	17	+22	59	
2	Racing FC	34	14	15	5	36	25	+11	57	Qualification for 2017 Caribbean Club Championship
3	Don Bosco FC	34	14	13	7	32	21	+11	55	Qualification for 2017 Caribbean Club Championship (Note: FICA declined participation in the 2017 Caribbean Club Championship, so their spot was awarded to 2015 Série d'Ouverture champion Don Dosco FC.)
4	Ouanaminthe FC	34	15	10	9	36	26	+10	55	
5	AS Capoise	34	14	10	10	25	23	+2	52	
6	Réal du Cap	34	12	14	8	33	24	+9	50	
7	Cavaly AS	34	14	7	13	30	34	−4	49	
8	AS Mirebalais	34	13	8	13	23	20	+3	47	
9	Petit-Goâve FC	34	12	10	12	24	31	−7	46	
10	Baltimore SC	34	9	15	10	23	24	−1	42	
11	America FC	34	11	8	15	21	23	−2	41	
12	Tempête FC	34	9	13	12	20	34	−14	40	
13	Juventus	34	10	9	15	42	43	−1	39	
14	Racing Club Haïtien	34	9	12	13	34	36	−2	39	
15	Aigle Noir AC	34	6	19	9	24	27	−3	37	Relegation to 2017 Championnat National D2
16	Roulado FC	34	9	10	15	28	38	−10	37	Relegation to 2017 Championnat National D2
17	Inter	34	9	10	15	19	32	−13	37	Relegation to 2017 Championnat National D2
18	Violette AC	34	4	17	13	17	28	−11	29	Relegation to 2017 Championnat National D2

Source: RSSSF
Rules for classification: 1) points; 2) goal difference; 3) number of goals scored.
