= 2019 Caribbean Club Championship =

2019 CONCACAF Caribbean Club Championship
2019 Flow CONCACAF Caribbean Club Championship

Tournament details
- Host country: Jamaica
- City: Kingston
- Dates: 12–19 May 2019
- Teams: 4 (from 2 associations)
- Venue: 1 (in 1 host city)

Final positions
- Champions: (Jamaica) Portmore United (2nd title)
- Runners-up: (Jamaica) Waterhouse
- Third place: (Haiti) Capoise
- Fourth place: (Haiti) Real Hope

Tournament statistics
- Matches played: 7
- Goals scored: 17 (2.43 per match)
- Top scorer(s): (Jamaica) Jovan East (Haiti) Frantz Moïse (3 goals each)

The 2019 Caribbean Club Championship was the 21st edition of the Caribbean Club Championship (also known as the CFU Club Championship), the first-tier annual international club football competition in the Caribbean region, held amongst clubs whose football associations are affiliated with the Caribbean Football Union (CFU), a sub-confederation of CONCACAF. The tournament was played in Jamaica between 12–19 May 2019.

Atlético Pantoja were the title holders, but did not compete in this season's CONCACAF Caribbean Club Championship. Portmore United were crowned Caribbean club champions for the second time and qualified for the 2020 CONCACAF Champions League. Runners-up Waterhouse and third place Capoise qualified for the 2019 CONCACAF League, but fourth-placed Real Hope lost to 2019 Caribbean Club Shield winners Robinhood in a playoff and failed to qualify for the CONCACAF League.

== Teams ==
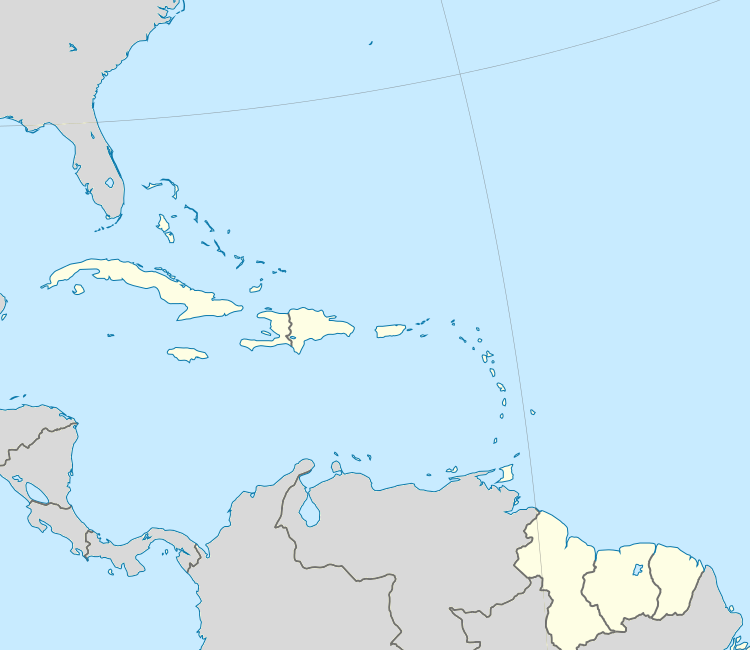
Location of teams of the 2019 CONCACAF Caribbean Club Championship
(H) Host.

Among the 31 CFU member associations, four of them were classified as professional leagues and each may enter two teams in the CONCACAF Caribbean Club Championship. However, two associations were not allowed to enter this season, and as a result, only four teams from two associations entered the 2019 CONCACAF Caribbean Club Championship (officially the 2019 Flow CONCACAF Caribbean Club Championship for sponsorship reasons).

Association	Team	Qualification method
Haiti	Real Hope	2017 Ligue Haïtienne Série d'Ouverture champions
Haiti	Capoise	2018 Ligue Haïtienne Série d'Ouverture champions
Jamaica (hosts)	Portmore United	2017–18 National Premier League champions
Jamaica (hosts)	Waterhouse	2017–18 National Premier League runners-up

Associations not allowed to enter

- Dominican Republic
  - The two teams from the Dominican Republic, Cibao (2018 Liga Dominicana de Fútbol championship playoffs champions) and Atlético de San Francisco (2018 Liga Dominicana de Fútbol regular season winners), were not allowed to compete in the 2019 CONCACAF Caribbean Club Championship as the association did not register them on time.
- Trinidad and Tobago
  - The two teams from Trinidad and Tobago, North East Stars (2017 TT Pro League champions) and W Connection (2017 TT Pro League runners-up), were not allowed to compete in the 2019 CONCACAF Caribbean Club Championship as the association did not properly execute its club licensing programme.

== Venue ==
The matches were played at the Stadium East in Kingston.

== Match officials ==
Referees

- Reon Radix (Grenada)
- Keylor Herrera (Costa Rica)
- Randy Encarnacion (Dominican Republic)
- José Raul Torres Rivera (Puerto Rico)

Assistant Referees

- Iroots Appleton (Antigua and Barbuda)
- Kevon Clarke (Barbados)
- Ronald Bruña (Panama)
- Yordanis Gomez (Cuba)
- Oscar Mitchell-Carvalho (Canada)

== Squads ==
Squad listings

Capoise

Note: Flags indicate national team as defined under FIFA eligibility rules; some limited exceptions apply. Players may hold more than one non-FIFA nationality.

No.	Pos.	Nation	Player
1	GK	HAI	Yves Mary Clervin
2	DF	HAI	Alexandre Charles
3	DF	HAI	Djimy- Bend Alexis
7	FW	HAI	Yves Adlin Dorimain
9	MF	HAI	Frantz Moise
10	MF	HAI	Ivenet Noel
11	FW	HAI	Marc Roberson Beldor
13	DF	HAI	Wenson Ferdinand
16	DF	HAI	Douly Celifort
17	MF	HAI	Stanley Sinois Jean
18	FW	HAI	Bernadin Almonor
19	MF	HAI	Saintilus Joseph
22	DF	HAI	Huguens Michel
23	GK	HAI	Marc Saul St-fleur
24	DF	HAI	Mackenley Louis
30	MF	HAI	Ojulesse Valcourt
31	MF	HAI	Judlin Piergile
32	DF	HAI	Stenio Laurent
40	GK	HAI	Wadnel Claxcemus

Portmore United

Note: Flags indicate national team as defined under FIFA eligibility rules; some limited exceptions apply. Players may hold more than one non-FIFA nationality.

No.	Pos.	Nation	Player
1	GK	JAM	Shaven Paul
4	DF	JAM	Damano Solomon
5	DF	JAM	Ryan Wellington
6	MF	JAM	Lamar Walker
7	MF	JAM	Damian Williams
8	MF	JAM	Ricardo Wayne Morris
9	FW	JAM	Roshane Sharpe
10	FW	JAM	Javon Romario East
12	FW	JAM	Venton Evans
13	GK	JAM	Kemar Foster
14	DF	JAM	Osani Ricketts
15	FW	JAM	Cleon Pryce
16	DF	JAM	Roberto Johnson
17	MF	JAM	Andre Cleveland Lewis
18	DF	JAM	Romaine Brackenridge
19	DF	JAM	Rosario Harriott
20	FW	JAM	Rondee Smith
21	MF	SUR	Donnegy Fer
23	MF	JAM	Emelio Rousseau
26	FW	JAM	Hardley Barnes

Real Hope

Note: Flags indicate national team as defined under FIFA eligibility rules; some limited exceptions apply. Players may hold more than one non-FIFA nationality.

No.	Pos.	Nation	Player
1	GK	HAI	Luis Valendi Odelus
5	DF	HAI	Mario Joseph Blaise
6	DF	HAI	Dunel Blaise
8	MF	HAI	Daniel Saint-fleur
10	MF	HAI	Johnson Jeudy
11	FW	HAI	Schneider Desamours
14	FW	HAI	Wendy St Felix
15		HAI	Denilson Pierre
16	MF	HAI	Berthelot Rumendez Bellora Charles
17	FW	HAI	Edmondo Dorvilus
19		HAI	Spencer Desir
20	MF	HAI	Renel Cineus
22	MF	HAI	Bruno Widlin
23	FW	HAI	Bernard Saintelys
24	MF	HAI	Jim Fednel Cerant
26	DF	HAI	Mackenson Pierre
27	DF	HAI	Veginio Registre
28	FW	HAI	Roody Joseph
35	GK	HAI	Max Djivenel Flericien

Waterhouse

Note: Flags indicate national team as defined under FIFA eligibility rules; some limited exceptions apply. Players may hold more than one non-FIFA nationality.

No.	Pos.	Nation	Player
1	GK	JAM	Akeem Chambers
3	DF	JAM	Oshane Roberts
7	MF	JAM	Stephen Williams
8	DF	JAM	Nicholy Finlayson
9	FW	JAM	Andre Mcfarlane
10	FW	JAM	Kenroy Howell
11	MF	JAM	Tramaine Stewart
13	DF	JAM	Ricardo Theodore Thomas
14	MF	JAM	Denilson Simpson
15	MF	JAM	Andre Fletcher
16	DF	JAM	Kymani Campbell
20	MF	JAM	Denardo Thomas
21	MF	JAM	Damion Binns
24	DF	JAM	Mark Miller
27	FW	JAM	Andre Leslie
30	DF	JAM	Shawn Lawes
34	GK	JAM	Diego Haughton
37	FW	JAM	Rafeik Thomas
47	MF	JAM	Keammar Daley
65	DF	JAM	Carlos Wright

== Matches ==
All times local, EST (UTC−5).

Pos	Team	Pld	W	D	L	GF	GA	GD	Pts	Qualification
1	(Jamaica) Portmore United (H)	3	2	1	0	3	1	+2	7	2020 CONCACAF Champions League
2	(Jamaica) Waterhouse (H)	3	1	2	0	5	3	+2	5	2019 CONCACAF League round of 16
3	(Haiti) Capoise	3	1	1	1	5	5	0	4	2019 CONCACAF League preliminary round
4	(Haiti) Real Hope	3	0	0	3	2	6	−4	0	CONCACAF League playoff

Source: CONCACAF
(H) Hosts
12 May 2019
17:30

Portmore United (Jamaica)	1–0	(Haiti) Real Hope
East 3'	Report

Stadium East, Kingston
Referee: Reon Radix (Grenada)
12 May 2019
20:00

Waterhouse (Jamaica)	2–2	(Haiti) Capoise
Fletcher 23'; Simpson 28'	Report	Noël 56'; Moïse 57'

Stadium East, Kingston
Referee: Keylor Herrera (Costa Rica)

14 May 2019
17:30

Real Hope (Haiti)	0–2	(Jamaica) Waterhouse
	Report	Simpson 19'; Williams 36'

Stadium East, Kingston
Referee: José Raúl Torres (Puerto Rico)
14 May 2019
20:00

Capoise (Haiti)	0–1	(Jamaica) Portmore United
	Report	East 73'

Stadium East, Kingston
Referee: Randy Encarnación (Dominican Republic)

16 May 2019
17:30

Capoise (Haiti)	3–2	(Haiti) Real Hope
Moïse 35', 55'; Pierre 51' (o.g.)	Report	Désir 1'; Joseph 82'

Stadium East, Kingston
Referee: José Raúl Torres (Puerto Rico)
16 May 2019
20:00

Portmore United (Jamaica)	1–1	(Jamaica) Waterhouse
East 24' (pen.)	Report	Fletcher 52'

Stadium East, Kingston
Referee: Keylor Herrera (Costa Rica)

=== CONCACAF League playoff ===
Qualified teams from 2019 Caribbean club competitions
- CONCACAF Champions League: (Jamaica) Portmore United
- CONCACAF League: (Jamaica) Waterhouse (Haiti) Capoise (Suriname) Robinhood

The CONCACAF League playoff was played between the 2019 CONCACAF Caribbean Club Championship fourth-placed team, Real Hope, and the 2019 CONCACAF Caribbean Club Shield winners, Robinhood, with the winners qualifying for the 2019 CONCACAF League preliminary round.

19 May 2019
15:00

Real Hope (Haiti)	1–1 (a.e.t.)	(Suriname) Robinhood
Blaise 33'	Report	Da Costa 15' (pen.)
Penalties
Pierre (penalty missed); Saint-Félix (penalty missed); Désir (penalty scored); Bruno (penalty missed)	1–3	(penalty scored) Rijssel; (penalty scored) Graves; (penalty scored) Ackenie

Stadium East, Kingston
Referee: Keylor Herrera (Costa Rica)

== Top goalscorers ==
Rank	Player	Team	Goals
1	(Jamaica) Jovan East	(Jamaica) Portmore United	3
1	(Haiti) Frantz Moïse	(Haiti) Capoise	3
3	(Jamaica) Andre Fletcher	(Jamaica) Waterhouse	2
3	(Jamaica) Keithy Simpson	(Jamaica) Waterhouse	2

== See also ==
- 2019 Caribbean Club Shield
- 2019 CONCACAF League
- 2020 CONCACAF Champions League
