= Danley Jean Jacques =

Haitian footballer (born 2000)

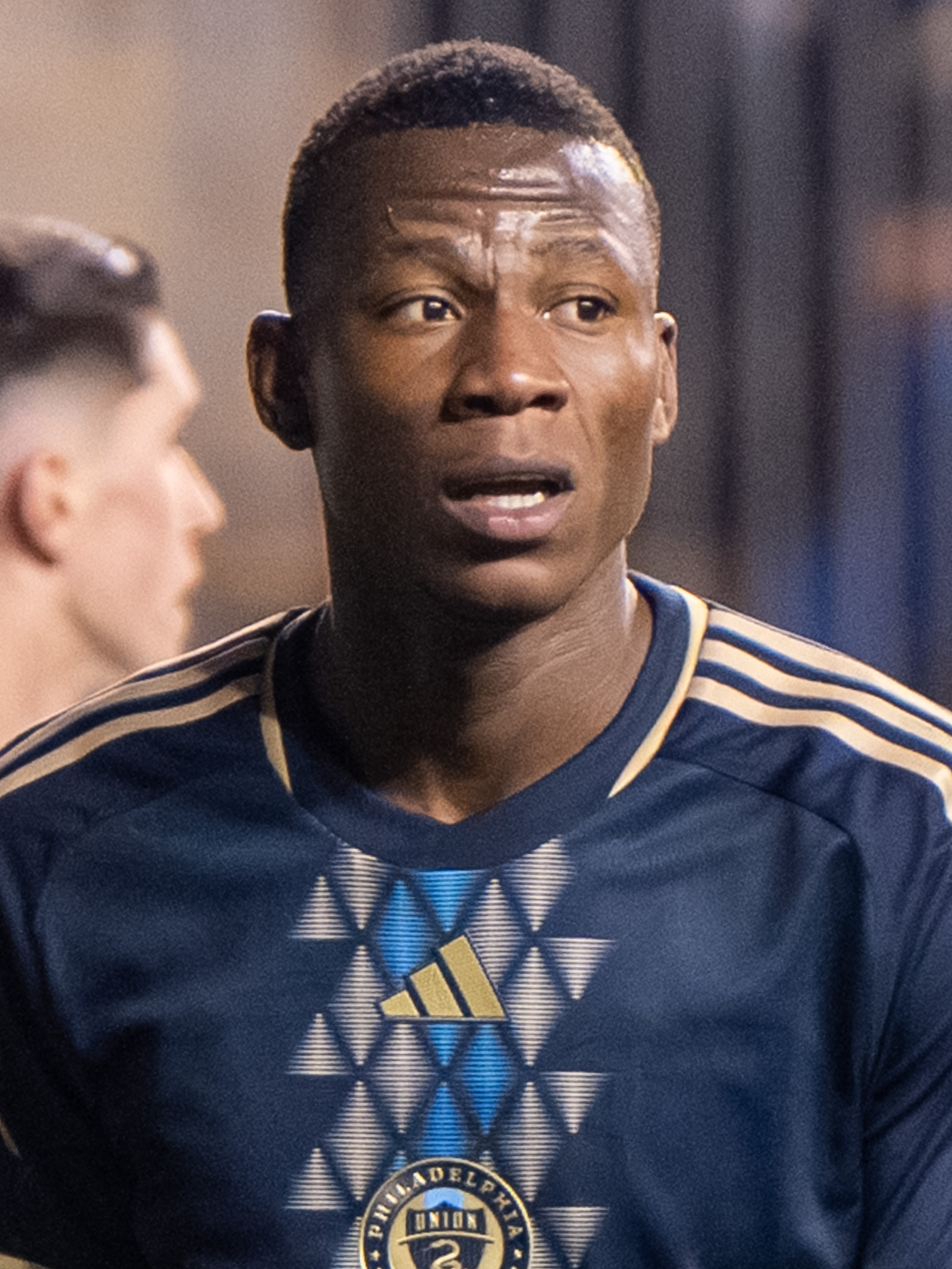
- Jean Jacques with the Philadelphia Union in 2025

Personal information
- Date of birth: 20 May 2000 (age 26)
- Place of birth: Petit-Goâve, Haiti
- Height: 1.82 m (6 ft 0 in)
- Position: Midfielder

Team information
- Current team: Philadelphia Union
- Number: 21

Youth career
- 2014–2017: Pérolas Negras

Senior career*
Years	Team	Apps	(Gls)
2017–2021	Don Bosco	52	(7)
2021–2022	Metz B	15	(0)
2022–2024	Metz	64	(0)
2024–	Philadelphia Union	64	(7)

International career^{‡}
2016–2017	Haiti U17	11	(2)
2018	Haiti U19	3	(1)
2018	Haiti U20	3	(0)
2018	Haiti U21	5	(1)
2019–2021	Haiti U23	2	(0)
2023–	Haiti	38	(6)
- * Club domestic league appearances and goals as of 23:14, 19 September 2026 (UTC) ‡ National team caps and goals as of 22:03, 4 October 2026 (UTC)

Danley Jean Jacques (born 20 May 2000) is a Haitian professional footballer who plays as a midfielder for the Philadelphia Union of Major League Soccer and the Haiti national team. He usually plays as a central midfielder or defensive midfielder.

== Youth career ==
=== Pérolas Negras ===
Starting in 2014, Jean Jacques’ youth training was done at Academia de Futebol Pérolas Negras, which started in Port-au-Prince for refugees after the 2009 Haitian earthquake before expanding in 2014 to Brazil for poverty-stricken Brazilians and other refugees. Jean Jacques was part of a Haitian team that trained in Brazil and participated as a guest team in the 2017 Copa São Paulo de Futebol Júnior U20 Cup.

== Club career ==
=== Don Bosco ===
In August 2017, Jean Jacques joined Don Bosco FC in Ligue Haïtienne. On 7 September 2017, Jean Jacques made his debut as a starter in the 2017 Closing opening game, a 0–0 tie against Petit-Goâve FC, his hometown team. He shortly thereafter went on a two-week trial with Le Havre before returning to Don Bosco. He played sparingly thereafter in the 2017 Closing and 2018 Opening seasons.

Jean Jacques began to play more regularly in the 2018 Closing season, including the playoffs, which saw Don Bosco win the championship.

Jean Jacques and other Haiti League players experienced several season abandonments due to civil unrest (2019 Opening) and COVID (2020 Opening). Jean Jacques finished his Don Bosco stint with 7 goals scored in 52 games.

=== Metz ===
In August 2021, Jean Jacques completed a successful trial with Metz and started with its reserve team in Championnat National 2, the 4th tier of French football. On 10 September 2021, he made his debut in a 1–0 win against SAS Épinal. For the 2021–22 season, Jean Jacques played 15 games.

On 7 June 2022, he signed a professional contract with Metz keeping him at the club until June 2024 and he was moved to the first team. On 30 July 2022, he made his professional debut with Metz in a 3–0 Ligue 2 win over Amiens. On 12 September 2022 in a 6–3 loss to EA Guingamp, Jean Jacques was given a red card for a tackle that later resulted in a four-game suspension. On 10 March 2023, Jean Jacques signed a contract extension with Metz through 2027. For the 2022–23 season, Metz was promoted to Ligue 1 as Jean Jacques played 31 league games.

For the 2023–24 season, Jean Jacques was again a regular starter for Metz. On 13 August 2023, he made his Ligue 1 debut in a 5–1 loss to Rennes. For the season, he played 33 league games; however, Metz was relegated back to Ligue 2.

=== Philadelphia Union ===
On 8 August 2024, Jean Jacques was acquired by Philadelphia Union in Major League Soccer for a €1.4 million transfer fee to Metz as well as $100,000 paid to Portland Timbers for his MLS Discovery Rights. He signed a contract through the end of the 2026 season with club options for 2027 and 2028.

On 21 August 2024, he made his debut in the Union's 2024 Leagues Cup semi-final game against Columbus Crew, which the Union lost 3–1.

== International career ==
Jean Jacques has represented Haiti at various age levels, having represented them from the Haiti U17s to the U21s.

=== U17 Team ===
On 20 July 2016, Jean Jacques made his international youth team debut by scoring a goal in a 3–0 win against Puerto Rico in a CONCACAF Caribbean Qualifier for the 2017 FIFA U-17 World Cup. On 25 September 2016, he scored in the Caribbean Qualifying Tournament Final, a 5–0 win against Cuba, that qualified Haiti for the 2017 CONCACAF U-17 Championship. For the Caribbean Qualifying Tournament, Jean Jacques was named by the CONCACAF Technical Study Group to the Tournament's Best XI Team.

Jean Jacques started all three games that Haiti played in the 2017 CONCACAF U-17 Championship in Panama.

=== U19 Team ===
In May 2018, Jean Jacques played in the 6-team Guadeloupe International Tournament, involving Caribbean and Central American teams. On 21 May 2018, he scored in the final, a 1–1 tie that Costa Rica won 4–3 on penalty kicks.

=== U20 Team ===
In November 2018, Jean Jacques played in three of Haiti's 2018 CONCACAF U-20 Championship qualifying games.

=== U21 Team ===
In July 2018, Jean Jacques played in the 2018 Central American and Caribbean Games in Colombia. On 21 July 2018, he scored the game-winning goal in a 1–0 win over El Salvador.

=== U23 Team ===
In July 2019, Jean Jacques was called into the team that won its group in the 1st qualifying round of the 2020 CONCACAF Men's Olympic Qualifying Championship.

In March 2021, Jean Jacques played in the final round of the 2020 CONCACAF Men's Olympic Qualifying Championship in Mexico.

=== National team ===
Jean Jacques was called up to the senior Haiti national team in March 2022 for a friendly against Guatemala; however, he did not play.

On 25 March 2023, Jean Jacques made his national team debut in Haiti's 4–0 win over Montserrat 2023–24 CONCACAF Nations League Group Stage.

On 29 June 2023, he scored his first goal in a 3–1 loss to Mexico in the 2023 CONCACAF Gold Cup.

On 15 May 2026, he was included in Haiti head coach Sébastien Migné's 26-man squad for the 2026 FIFA World Cup.

== Career statistics ==
=== Club ===
As of match played 19 September 2026

Appearances and goals by club, season and competition
Club	Season	League			National cup		Continental		Other		Total	
Club	Season	Division	Apps	Goals	Apps	Goals	Apps	Goals	Apps	Goals	Apps	Goals
Don Bosco	2015	Ligue Haïtienne	1	0	—		—		—		1	0
Don Bosco	2016	Ligue Haïtienne	3	0	—		—		—		3	0
Don Bosco	2017	Ligue Haïtienne	9	0	—		—		—		9	0
Don Bosco	2018	Ligue Haïtienne	15	2	—		—		—		15	2
Don Bosco	2019	Ligue Haïtienne	12	3	—		—		—		12	3
Don Bosco	2020	Ligue Haïtienne	11	1	—		2 (Note: Appearances in CONCACAF Caribbean Cup)	0	—		13	1
Don Bosco	2020–21	Ligue Haïtienne	1	1	—		—		—		1	1
Don Bosco	Total		52	7	—		2	0	—		54	7
Metz B	2021–22	CFA	15	0	—		—		—		15	0
Metz	2022–23	Ligue 2	31	0	2	0	—		—		33	0
Metz	2023–24	Ligue 1	33	0	1	0	—		2 (Note: Appearances in Ligue 1 relegation/promotion play-offs)	0	36	0
Metz	Total		64	0	3	0	—		2	0	67	0
Philadelphia Union	2024	Major League Soccer	8	0	—		—		2 (Note: Appearances in Leagues Cup)	0	10	0
Philadelphia Union	2025	Major League Soccer	31	3	3	1	—		3 (Note: Appearances in MLS Cup Playoffs)	0	37	4
Philadelphia Union	2026	Major League Soccer	25	4	0	0	3 (Note: Appearances in CONCACAF Champions Cup)	0	2	0	30	4
Philadelphia Union	Total		64	7	3	1	3	0	7	0	77	8
Career total			175	14	6	1	5	0	9	0	215	15

=== International ===
As of match played 4 October 2026

Appearances and goals by national team and year
National team	Year	Apps	Goals
Haiti	2023	8	1
Haiti	2024	9	2
Haiti	2025	11	3
Haiti	2026	10	0
Total		38	6

Scores and results list Haiti's goal tally first, score column indicates score after each Jean Jacques goal.

List of international goals scored by Danley Jean Jacques
No.	Date	Venue	Opponent	Score	Result	Competition	Ref.
1	29 June 2023	State Farm Stadium, Glendale, United States	Mexico	1–2	1–3	2023 CONCACAF Gold Cup	
2	6 September 2024	Mayagüez Athletics Stadium, Mayagüez, Puerto Rico	Puerto Rico	2–1	4–1	2024–25 CONCACAF Nations League B	
3	14 October 2024	Trinidad Stadium, Oranjestad, Aruba	Aruba	1–1	5–3	2024–25 CONCACAF Nations League B	
4	22 March 2025	Sumgayit City Stadium, Sumgayit, Azerbaijan	Azerbaijan	3–0	3–0	Friendly	
5	7 June 2025	Trinidad Stadium, Oranjestad, Aruba	Aruba	1–0	5–0	2026 FIFA World Cup qualification	
6	9 October 2025	Nicaragua National Football Stadium, Managua, Nicaragua	Nicaragua	2–0	3–0	2026 FIFA World Cup qualification	

== Honours ==
Philadelphia Union

- Supporters' Shield: 2025
