= 2012–13 National Premier League =

Red Stripe National Premier League
- Season: 2012–13
- Champions: Harbour View F.C.
- Relegated: Highgate United F.C. & Savannah S.C.
- Caribbean Club Championship: Harbour View F.C.
- Goals scored: 52
- Highest scoring: Arnett Gardens FC

The 2012–13 National Premier League (known as the Red Stripe Premier League for sponsorship purposes) was contested by the twelve teams in the top tier of association football in Jamaica. The season began in September 2012 and was completed in May 2012. The league was split into a champion's group and relegation group after 33 matches. Both groups then played five more matches within that group. Portmore United were the defending champions, having won their fifth Jamaica Premier League title the prior season.

On April 21, 2013 Harbour View F.C. won the league to earn their 4th National Premier League title in a 2–0 victory against Boys' Town F.C.

== Final league table ==
Team	Pld	W	D	L	GF	GA	GD	Pts
Harbour View F.C.	33	17	11	5	43	16	+27	62
Portmore United F.C.	33	14	11	8	41	23	+18	53
Waterhouse F.C.	33	14	11	8	40	23	+17	53
Boys' Town F.C.	33	15	8	10	41	33	+8	53
Arnett Gardens F.C.	33	14	9	10	45	44	+1	51
Tivoli Gardens F.C.	33	13	9	11	37	33	+4	48
Montego Bay United F.C.	33	13	8	12	41	34	+7	47
Sporting Central Academy F.C.	33	12	7	14	37	38	−1	43
Cavalier F.C.	33	11	9	13	28	36	−8	42
Humble Lions F.C.	33	9	10	14	27	38	−11	37
Highgate United F.C.	33	8	8	17	30	48	−18	32
Savannah S.C.	33	4	7	22	19	63	−44	19
