= Luis Valendi Odelus =

Haitian footballer (born 1994)

Personal information
- Date of birth: December 1, 1994 (age 31)
- Place of birth: Saint-Louis-du-Nord, Haiti
- Height: 1.84 m (6 ft 0 in)
- Position: Goalkeeper

Team information
- Current team: Real Hope FA
- Number: 31

Youth career
- Assl

Senior career*
Years	Team	Apps	(Gls)
2013–2016	Aigle Noir		
2016–2020	Real du Cap	96	(0)
2021–2023	Don Bosco		
2023–2024	FICA		
2024–	Real Hope FA		

International career
- Haiti U23
- Haiti
- * Club domestic league appearances and goals

Luis Valendi Odelus (born 1 December 1994) is a Haitian football player who currently plays for Real Hope FA.
