= Luiyi de Lucas =

Dominican Republic footballer (b. 1994)

Personal information
- Full name: Luiyi Ramón de Lucas Pérez
- Date of birth: 31 August 1994 (age 32)
- Place of birth: Galván, Dominican Republic
- Height: 1.94 m (6 ft 4 in)
- Position: Centre-back

Team information
- Current team: Krasava Ypsonas
- Number: 3

Youth career
- Torrejón
- Guadalajara
- Alcalá

Senior career*
Years	Team	Apps	(Gls)
2013–2015	Guadalajara B	28	(2)
2015	Alameda de Osuna	13	(1)
2015–2016	Azuqueca	26	(0)
2016	Marchamalo	11	(0)
2016–2017	Azuqueca	5	(0)
2017	Barcelona Atlético		
2017–2018	La Roda	20	(1)
2018	Cibao	10+	(1)
2018–2019	Caudal	16	(2)
2019–2020	Lealtad	20	(0)
2020	Izarra	6	(0)
2020–2022	Haka	64	(5)
2023–2024	Livingston	22	(1)
2024	AEL Limassol	11	(0)
2024–2025	Ashdod	13	(0)
2025	Nea Salamina	13	(2)
2025–	Krasava Ypsonas	33	(2)

International career^{‡}
2024	Dominican Republic Olympic (O.P.)	2	(0)
2018–	Dominican Republic	33	(1)
- * Club domestic league appearances and goals as of 11 October 2026 ‡ National team caps and goals as of 5 October 2026

Luiyi Ramón de Lucas Pérez (born 31 August 1994) is a Dominican footballer who plays as a defender for the Cypriot First Division club Krasava Ypsonas and the Dominican Republic national team.

== Club career ==
After a number of years playing in the lower leagues of Spain and in the Dominican Republic, de Lucas signed for Finnish top flight Veikkausliiga side Haka in August 2020, where he stayed for two and a half years.

In January 2023, de Lucas joined Scottish Premiership club Livingston, but left the club in the next January transfer window after developing feelings of homesickness.

On 8 January 2024, de Lucas signed with Cypriot First Division club AEL Limassol.

De Lucas signed for Israeli Premier League side Ashdod in August 2024.

== International career ==
De Lucas made his formal debut for Dominican Republic on 12 October 2018, playing an entire 3–0 win against Cayman Islands for the 2019–20 CONCACAF Nations League qualification. He had played a match against Bonaire on 9 September 2018, but it was not recognised by FIFA.

== Career statistics ==
As of 29 March 2026

Appearances and goals by club, season and competition
Club	Season	League			National cup (Note: Includes Copa del Rey, Scottish Cup, Suomen Cup, Cypriot Cup, Israel State Cup)		League cup (Note: Includes Finnish League Cup, Scottish League Cup)		Total	
Club	Season	Division	Apps	Goals	Apps	Goals	Apps	Goals	Apps	Goals
Guadalajara B	2013-14	Tercera División	12	0	0	0	0	0	12	0
Guadalajara B	2014–15	Tercera División	16	2	0	0	0	0	16	2
Guadalajara B	Total		28	2	0	0	0	0	28	2
Alameda de Osuna EF	2014–15	Tercera División	13	1	–		–		13	1
Azuqueca	2015–16	Tercera División	26	0	–		–		26	0
Marchamalo	2016–17	Tercera División	11	0	–		–		11	0
Azuqueca	2016–17	Tercera División	5	0	–		–		5	0
La Roda	2017–18	Tercera División	20	1	–		–		20	1
Cibao	2018	LDF	10	1	–		–		10	1
Caudal	2018–19	Tercera División	15	1	–		–		15	1
Lealtad	2019–20	Tercera División	19	0	1	0	–		20	0
Izarra	2019–20	Segunda División B	6	0	–		–		6	0
Haka	2020	Veikkausliiga	9	1	–		–		9	1
Haka	2021	Veikkausliiga	25	3	2	0	–		27	3
Haka	2022	Veikkausliiga	25	1	3	0	5	0	33	1
Haka	Total		59	5	5	0	5	0	69	5
Livingston	2022–23	Scottish Premiership	10	0	0	0	0	0	10	0
Livingston	2023–24	Scottish Premiership	12	1	0	0	3	0	15	1
Livingston	Total		22	1	0	0	3	0	25	1
AEL Limassol	2023–24	Cypriot First Division	10	0	1	0	–		11	0
Ashdod	2024–25	Israeli Premier League	13	0	0	0	0	0	13	0
Nea Salamina	2024–25	Cypriot First Division	13	2	0	0	–		13	2
Krasava	2025–26	Cypriot First Division	28	1	1	0	–		29	1
Krasava	2026–27	Cypriot First Division	5	1	0	0	0	0	5	1
Krasava	Total		33	2	1	0	0	0	33	2
Career total			303	16	8	0	8	0	319	16

== Honours ==
Cibao

- Liga Dominicana de Fútbol: 2018

Individual

- FC Haka Player of the Year: 2021
