= Football in Haiti =

- Country: Haiti
- Governing body: FHF
- National team: Haiti
- First played: 1912; 114 years ago

National competitions
- Coupe d'Haïti

Club competitions
- Championnat National D1; Championnat National D2; Championnat National D3.

International competitions
- CONCACAF Champions League; CONCACAF League; Caribbean Club Championship; FIFA Club World Cup; CONCACAF Gold Cup (National Team); CONCACAF Nations League (National Team); FIFA World Cup (National Team); CONCACAF Women's Championship (National Team); FIFA Women's World Cup (National Team)

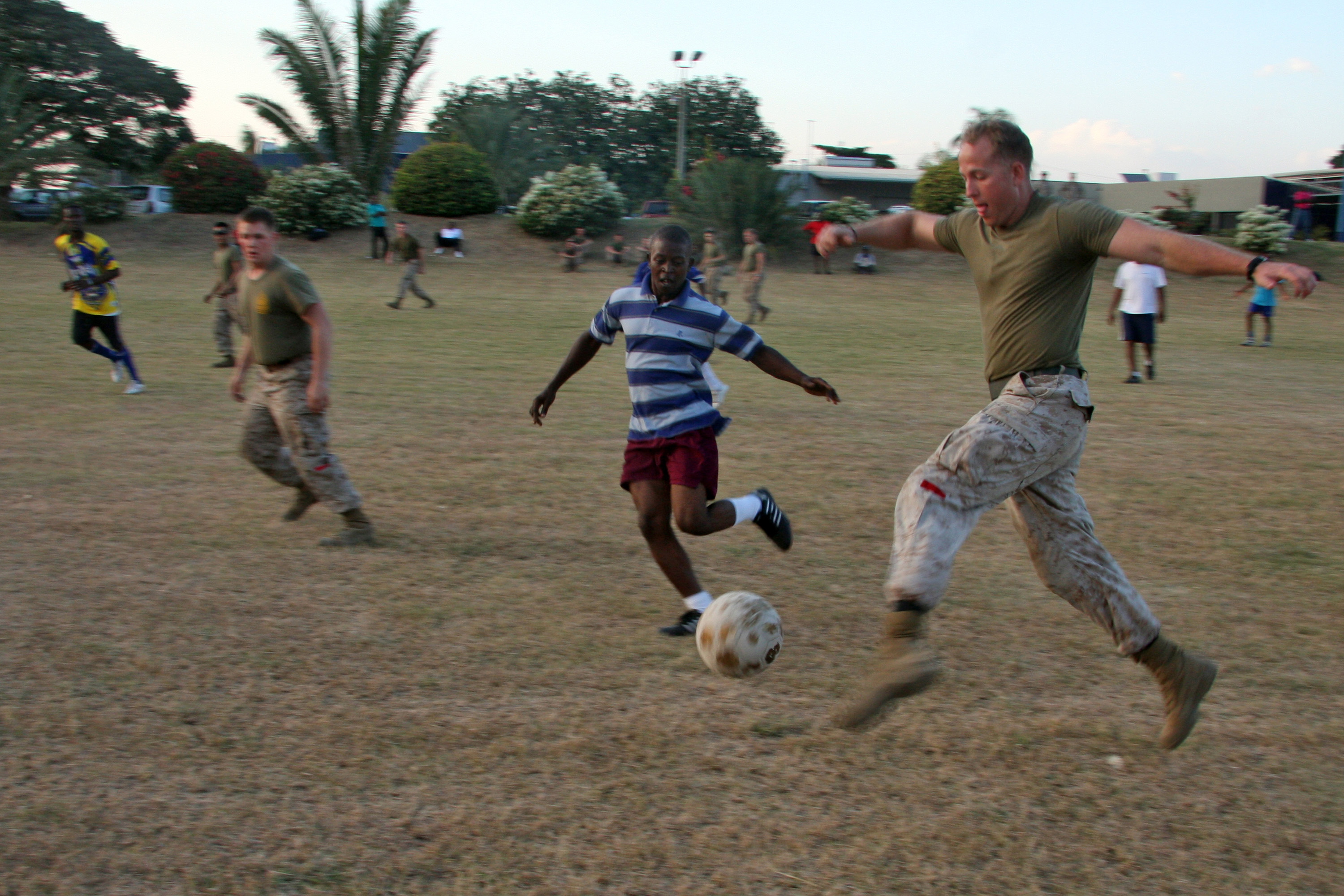
Football in Haiti.

Football is the most popular sport in Haiti. Approximately 30% of the people in Haiti are interested in football.

Football in Haiti is run by the Fédération Haïtienne de Football. The association administers the national football team, as well as the national football league. Football in Haiti first developed in the state capital of Port-au-Prince, where a regional championship round was already held for the first time in 1912.

== Domestic football ==
Among the two major rivals of the Haitian club football are the Racing Club Haïtien and the Violette Athletic Club, both of which are located in Port-au-Prince and could once again win the CONCACAF Champions' Cup, although in both cases this took place without a contest.

In 1963, Racing reached the final matches against the previous champions, CD Guadalajara. It was originally planned to play both matches in Guadalajara. However, because the Haitians did not receive their entry permit in time, the encounter had to be postponed. Since two other dates were not honored by the Haitians, the CD Guadalajara filed an official complaint with CONCACAF, which finally declared the Mexicans the winner. Racing then lodged a complaint which led CONCACAF to the decision announced on 2 April 1964 that the matches should now be compulsorily within the next two months. However, because Guadalajara had already planned a five-week Europareise at that time, the club renounced the final participation and the Racing Club Haïtien was now declared the winner by CONCACAF.

The 1984 tournament, which was divided into a North and Central American section on the one hand, and a Caribbean section on the other, was not finished. The Haitian representative, Violette won the Caribbean branch and reached the final, while the final round of the North- and Central American branch between the New York Pancyprian-Freedoms and the club Deportivo Guadalajara had not been possible because both teams could not agree on a match. As a result, both were disqualified and the Violette Athletic Club were declared the Winner.

== League system ==
Level	League(s)/Division(s)
1	Championnat National D1; 18 clubs
2	Championnat National D2; 57 clubs
3	Championnat National D3; 80 clubs

== National team ==
In 1973, Haiti hosted the CONCACAF Championship, which also served as the qualification for the 1974 World Cup in Germany. Haiti won all but their last match against Mexico but finished with the most points in the tournament and qualified for their first world football championship, where arguably their best football player of all time, Emmanuel Sanon, wrote history. The first half of their debut game against Italy ended in a scoreless draw, but the team surprised the football world when star forward Emmanuel Sanon scored shortly after the break to give Haiti a 1–0 lead. Although the Italians eventually came back to win the game 3–1, Sanon's goal ended goal keeper Dino Zoff's record run of 1143 minutes without conceding a goal in international matches. The team went on to lose to Poland (0–7) and Argentina (1–4) to finish last in their group, with their second goal in the tournament coming from Sanon.

The 1977 CONCACAF Championship also served as a qualifying tournament for the 1978 FIFA World Cup in Argentina. After losing the opening match against Mexico 1–4, Haiti had the chance to qualify for another World Cup. However, because Mexico also won all of its following matches, Haiti once again took second place, before the national team went into a period of insignificance.

Previously, Haiti had already missed a great opportunity in the qualifying tournament for the 1970 FIFA World Cup in Mexico, which automatically qualified the host country standing in the way of Haiti's entry. However, Haiti had a last moment to qualify but faltered to El Salvador, who instead went to the World Cup.

== National women's team ==
Haiti qualified for the 2023 FIFA Women's World Cup.

== Football stadiums in Haiti ==
Stadium	Location	Tenants	Capacity	Image
Stade Sylvio Cator	Port-au-Prince	Haiti national football team	20,000	

== Attendances ==
The average attendance per top-flight football league season and the club with the highest average attendance:

Season	League average	Best club	Best club average
2019	380	Real Hope	738

Source: League page on Wikipedia

== See also ==
- Lists of stadiums
- Haiti national soccer team
- Haiti women's national football team
- Ligue Haïtienne
- List of football clubs in Haiti
