= Frantz Gilles =

Haitian footballer (born 1977)

Personal information
- Date of birth: 1 November 1977 (age 48)
- Place of birth: Léogâne, Haiti
- Position: Defender

Senior career*
| Years | Team | Apps | (Gls) |
| 2000 | Cavaly | | |
| 2001–2002 | Zénith | | |
| 2002–2016 | Cavaly | | |

International career
| 1999–2010 | Haiti | 70 | (2) |
- * Club domestic league appearances and goals

Frantz Gilles (born 1 November 1977) is a Haitian former professional footballer who played as a defender for Cavaly AS and Zénith in the Ligue Haïtienne.

== Club career ==
Gilles spent almost his entire career for his hometown club Cavaly, except for a short spell at Zénith FC in Cap-Haïtien.

== International career ==
A mainstay of the national teams for almost ten years, Gilles made his debut for Haiti in a June 1999 friendly match against Trinidad and Tobago. He was a Haiti squad member at the 2002 and 2007 Gold Cup Finals and he played in 12 World Cup qualification matches in 2000 and 2004.

== Honours ==
Haiti

- Caribbean Nations Cup: 2007
