= Frantz Jean-Charles =

Haitian footballer (born 1968)

Personal information
- Full name: Frantz Philippe Jean-Charles
- Date of birth: 9 June 1968 (age 58)
- Place of birth: Gonaïves, Haiti
- Height: 1.80 m (5 ft 11 in)
- Position: Forward

College career
Years	Team	Apps	(Gls)
1991–1992	Essex County Wolverines		(49)
1994–1995	Bloomfield Deacons		(73)

Senior career*
Years	Team	Apps	(Gls)
1988–1991	CS Saint-Louis	42	(37)
1994–1995	New Jersey Stallions		
1996–1998	New Jersey Stallions	21	(11)

International career
1988–1991	Haiti	3	
- * Club domestic league appearances and goals

Frantz Philippe Jean-Charles (born 9 June 1968) is a retired Haitian footballer.

== Career ==
Jean-Charles rose to prominence in 1988 while playing for Club Sportif Saint-Louis in the Ligue Haïtienne. He scored his first goal against Excelsior and was one of the all-time leading scorers for his club. In his first two seasons, 1988–89 and 1989–90, he won the league scoring title and was named national player of the year twice. During his brief stint with Saint-Louis, he played for the Haiti national football team between 1988 and 1991.

In May 1991, Jean-Charles moved to the United States to attend Essex County College. During his two years at Essex, he scored 49 goals and added 35 assists. Essex won the Region XIX championship in 1992 and Jean-Charles was named regional player of the year after tallying nine goals and three assists during the tournament. He then moved to Bloomfield College for his junior and senior seasons, where he earned himself the nickname "Scoring Machine". Bloomfield coach Ralph Duggan said, "Frantz came to Bloomfield with reputation of being a scoring machine and I think he lived up to that" (Star Ledger Tuesday 20 December 1994). The following year, coach Phil Santamassino seconded his predecessor's assessment and noted: "Frantz could take a defender on and almost put him to sleep. He would slow down the tempo and then fly by the guy" (Star Ledger Friday 8 December 1995). In his two years at Bloomfield in 1994 and 1995, Jean-Charles scored 73 goals, assisted on 54 others, and was twice named as the Central Atlantic Collegiate Conference (CACC) Player of the Year. In 1995, he broke his previous 98 point mark when he scored 104 points, the most in the history of the state of New Jersey, according to the Star Ledger (Friday 8 December 1995). In his collegiate career, Jean-Charles amassed 122 goals and 89 assists. He was a 1994 and 1995 National Association of Intercollegiate Athletics (NAIA) Second Team All-American.

While in college, Jean-Charles played for the New Jersey Stallions. He helped the Stallions win the Northeastern Super Soccer League in 1994, scoring in the semi-final against Polish-American Eagles and in the final against Columbia S.C. The following year, Jean-Charles helped the Stallions defeat Napoli in the final of the Italian-American Soccer League (IASL) 3–1, where he scored two goals. The Stallions later joined the USISL and he stayed with the team for two years, scoring 11 goals before retiring.

On 7 May 2011, Jean-Charles was inducted into the Bloomfield College Athletic Hall of Fame.
