= Ralph Chapoteau =

Haitian painter

- Born: September 16, 1954; Gonaïves
- Died: May 21, 2024 (aged 69); Texas, U.S.
- Education: Fine Arts Academy
- Occupation: Painter
- Notable work: Chapoteau's work was first exhibited in 1978 and has since been displayed throughout the Caribbean, including Santo Domingo and Guadeloupe.
- Spouse: Josette Chapoteau
- Children: Rain Chapoteau

Ralph Chapoteau (September 16, 1954 – May 21, 2024) was a Haitian painter. He was born in Gonaïves.

== Education ==
Chapoteau attended the Fine Arts Academy beginning in 1974.

== Career ==
His work was first exhibited in 1978 and has since been displayed throughout the Caribbean, including Santo Domingo and Guadeloupe. He married Josette Chapoteau in 2002 and they have a child named Rain. Josette has extensive experience in apparel design.

Ralph Chapoteau & Josette Chapoteau created a designer fashion brand named Touta in May 2011. He died in Texas in 2024, from cancer.
