= Maurice Sixto =

Maurice Alfrédo Sixto (May 23, 1919, Gonaïves, Haiti – May 12, 1984, Philadelphia, USA) was a pioneer of a Haitian oral literary genre known as Lodyans, and distributed his works widely through the audio technology of his time, including LP's and cassettes . To this day Sixto remains the best known author in the genre. He was also a professor, ambassador, translator, and tour guide.

The son of an engineer, Maurice Alfredo Sixto and Maria Bourand, he attended St Louis de Gonzague in Port-au-Prince for his secondary studies. Upon graduation he attended l'Academie Militaire where he remained for only three months. He eventually studied law at the Faculte de Droit from 1945–1948 while working for Radio HHBM (now MBC).

Sixto is remembered in Haitian culture for his contributions to oral literature. His ability to use rich, descriptive, and iconic Haitian Creole idioms and expressions create a narrative that displays the true face of Haitian culture.

Sixto prefaces every story with Regards sur choses et gens entendu (Regarding Things Seen and People Heard).

In 2018, Sixto, his work and legacy were the subject of an academic colloquium in Port-au-Prince.

Sixto's influences in the Lodyans genre include Justin Lhérisson while his successors include Charlot Lucien.

== Published work ==
- Volume I: Lea Kokoyé; Madan Ròròl
- Volume II: Zabèlbòk Berachat; Bòs Chaleran
- Volume III: Ti Sentaniz; Madan Senvilus; Lòk Tama; Pè Tanmba
- Volume IV: Gwo Moso; Ti Kam; Tant Mezi; Ronma lan ekspò; Priyè devan katedral
- Volume V: J'ai vengé la race; Dépestre; Le corallin du Célibataire; Les ambassadeurs à Kinshasa
- Volume VI: Madan Jul; Ton chal; L'homme citron; Men yon lòt lang; Pleyonas; Téofil; Le jeune agronome; Général Ti Kòk; La petite veste de galerie de Papa
- Leya Kokoye ak lòt lodyans, Presses Nationales D'Haiti, 2005.

Today, the Foyer Maurice Sixto, honors his work and social commentary found in Ti Sentanize, where Sixto derides his fellow bourgeoisie countrymen for their abuse and forced labor of domestic children servants also referred to as Restavecs.
