= Jean-Euphèle Milcé =

Haitian writer (born 1969)

Jean-Euphèle Milcé (born 1969) is a Haitian writer and librarian.

== Life ==
He was born in Passe-Reine, Gonaïves in the north of Haiti. He studied at the State University of Haiti and the University of Fribourg. He has served as head of PEN Haiti.

Milcé is best known for his 2004 novel L’Alphabet des nuits which won the Prix Georges Nicole in Switzerland and was nominated for several other literary awards. The novel was translated into English by Christopher Moncrieff and published by Pushkin Press.
