= 2018 Liga Dominicana de Fútbol =

Liga Dominicana de Fútbol
- Season: 2018
- Champions: Cibao FC
- 2019 CFU Club Championship: Cibao FC; Atlético de San Francisco
- Matches played: 152
- Goals scored: 424 (2.79 per match)
- Biggest home win: Atlético San Cristóbal 8-0 Delfines del Este FC
- Biggest away win: Atlético Vega Real 0-8 Atlético de San Francisco
- Highest scoring: Universidad O&M F.C. 5-4 Cibao FC; Moca FC 8-1 Delfines del Este FC

The 2018 Liga Dominicana de Fútbol season (known as the LDF Banco Popular for sponsorship reasons) is the fourth season of professional football in the Dominican Republic. Atlántico FC are the reigning champions, having won this first title last season. The season started on 7 April 2018 and ended on 27 October 2018.

== Team changes ==
While there is no promotion or relegation involving this league, there were changes to the composition of the league from last season. Bauger FC have left the league following last season. Meanwhile, three new teams have joined the league: Jarabacoa FC, Inter RD, and Atlético de San Francisco. Thus, the league now has 12 teams in total.

== Format changes ==
The format of the competition has changed for this season. The regular season will still consist of a double round robin between the participating teams. After this, a Liguilla round will be played between the top six finishers of the regular season, with a single round robin between the teams. The top 4 finishers of this phase will move on to the knockout phase of the playoffs, where the champion will be decided. The top team at the end of the regular season along with the playoff champion will qualify for the 2019 Caribbean Club Championship.

== Stadia and locations ==
Locations of Liga Dominicana de Fútbol clubs

Team	Location	Stadium	Capacity
Atlántico FC	Puerto Plata	Estadio Leonel Plácido	2,000
Atlético San Cristóbal	San Cristóbal	Estadio Panamericano	2,800
Atlético de San Francisco	San Francisco de Macorís	Olímpico de San Francisco de Macoris	500
Atlético Vega Real	La Vega	Estadio Olímpico	7,000
Cibao FC	Santiago	Estadio Cibao FC	5,000
Club Atlético Pantoja	Santo Domingo	Estadio Olímpico Félix Sánchez	27,000
Club Barcelona Atlético	Santo Domingo Este	Estadio Parque del Este	3,000
Delfines del Este FC	La Romana	Estadio Municipal La Romana	1,200
Inter RD	Bayaguana	Complejo deportivo de Bayaguana	1,800
Jarabacoa FC	Jarabacoa	Estadio Olímpico	7,000
Moca FC	Moca	Estadio Complejo Deportivo Moca 86	7,000
Universidad O&M F.C.	Santo Domingo	Estadio Olímpico Félix Sánchez	27,000

== Regular season ==
The regular season began on 7 April 2018 and ended on 26 August 2018. The regular season winner qualified for the 2019 Caribbean Club Championship.

=== Regular season table ===
Pos	Team	Pld	W	D	L	GF	GA	GD	Pts	Qualification
1	Atlético de San Francisco	22	15	3	4	48	21	+27	48	Liguilla and 2019 Caribbean Club Championship
2	Cibao FC	22	14	4	4	49	25	+24	46	Liguilla
3	Club Atlético Pantoja	22	14	3	5	31	20	+11	45	Liguilla
4	Moca FC	22	11	5	6	35	26	+9	38	Liguilla
5	Atlético Vega Real	22	10	6	6	32	20	+12	36	Liguilla
6	Universidad O&M F.C.	22	10	6	6	37	30	+7	36	Liguilla
7	Atlántico FC	22	9	8	5	26	24	+2	35	
8	Jarabacoa FC	22	7	4	11	29	30	−1	25	
9	Delfines del Este FC	22	4	8	10	18	47	−29	20	
10	Atlético San Cristóbal	22	3	8	11	28	39	−11	17	
11	Inter RD	22	2	4	16	14	43	−29	10	
12	Club Barcelona Atlético	22	1	5	16	17	39	−22	8	

Rules for classification: 1) points; 2) fewer games lost; 3) Head-to-head points; 4) Head-to-head goal difference; 5) Head-to-head goals scored; 6) goal difference; 7) goals scored

=== Regular season results ===
Home \ Away	ATL	ASC	ASF	AVR	CIB	CAP	CBA	DDE	IRD	JAR	MOC	UOM
Atlántico FC	—	1–0	1–0	0–1	1–1	1–2	1–1	0–0	4–0	1–0	1–1	1–0
Atlético San Cristóbal	2–2	—	2–5	0–3	2–6	0–0	3–1	8–0	1–1	1–1	0–2	0–0
Atlético de San Francisco	5–1	3–0	—	1–2	3–3	3–2	2–0	3–0	2–0	2–1	2–3	2–1
Atlético Vega Real	2–3	1–0	2–3	—	0–1	0–1	2–0	3–0 (Note: The match between Atlético Vega Real and Delfines del Este FC on 28 July was awarded to Atlético Vega Real 3-0 as Delfines del Este FC did not show up due to a player strike.)	1–1	1–1	2–1	1–1
Cibao FC	4–2	3–2	1–2	1–1	—	4–0	4–1	1–0	2–0	3–1	1–2	2–2
Club Atlético Pantoja	2–0	2–0	0–0	0–0	3–2	—	1–0	2–0	3–1	0–2	1–0	2–3
Club Barcelona Atlético	1–2	0–0	0–1	1–3	0–1	0–1	—	2–2	4–1	2–2	0–1	0–1
Delfines del Este FC	1–1	1–1	0–0	3–2	0–4	0–1	2–0	—	1–0	3–0	0–0	0–4
Inter RD	0–1	2–1	0–1	1–1	1–2	2–4	2–0	0–0	—	0–2	0–3	1–3
Jarabacoa FC	0–1	1–2	0–1	1–0	1–2	1–0	3–2	4–1	4–0	—	0–0	0–2
Moca FC	0–0	2–2	0–6	0–3	0–1	1–2	2–0	8–1	2–1	1–0	—	2–1
Universidad O&M F.C.	1–1	2–1	2–1	0–1	1–0	0–2	2–2	3–3	1–0	5–4	2–4	—

Source: RSSSF
Legend: Blue = home team win; Yellow = draw; Red = away team win.

== Liguilla ==
The top 6 teams from the regular season participated in a single round robin tournament to determine who qualifies for the championship playoffs. The liguilla started on 1 September 2018 and ended on 30 September 2018.

=== Ligilla table ===
Pos	Team	Pld	W	D	L	GF	GA	GD	Pts	Qualification
1	Cibao FC	5	2	2	1	10	6	+4	8	Championship playoffs
2	Atlético de San Francisco	5	2	2	1	4	3	+1	8	Championship playoffs
3	Atlético Vega Real	5	2	2	1	5	8	−3	8	Championship playoffs
4	Club Atlético Pantoja	5	2	1	2	7	7	0	7	Championship playoffs
5	Universidad O&M F.C.	5	1	1	3	8	8	0	4	
6	Moca FC	5	0	4	1	4	6	−2	4	

Rules for classification: 1) points; 2) fewer games lost; 3) Head-to-head points; 4) Head-to-head goal difference; 5) Head-to-head goals scored; 6) goal difference; 7) goals scored

=== Liguilla results ===
Home \ Away	ASF	AVR	CIB	CAP	MOC	UOM
Atlético de San Francisco	—	0–1	—	—	—	—
Atlético Vega Real	—	—	—	—	1–1	0–5
Cibao FC	1–1	1–1	—	1–2	—	—
Club Atlético Pantoja	0–1	1–2	—	—	2–2	—
Moca FC	1–1	—	0–2	—	—	0–0
Universidad O&M F.C.	0–1	—	2–5	1–2	—	—

Updated to match(es) played on unknown. Source: RSSSF
Legend: Blue = home team win; Yellow = draw; Red = away team win.

== Championship playoffs ==
The top 4 finishers of the Liguilla qualify for this phase. These matches began on 6 October 2018 and ended on 27 October 2018.

Semifinals
1	Cibao FC	3	3	6
4	Club Atlético Pantoja	2	2	4
2	Atlético de San Francisco	8	2	10
3	Atlético Vega Real	0	1	1

Final
1	Cibao FC	1
2	Atlético de San Francisco	0

=== Semifinals ===
The first legs were played on 6 and 7 October 2018 and the second legs were played on 20 and 21 October 2018.

Team 1	Agg.	Team 2	1st leg	2nd leg
Club Atlético Pantoja	4–6	Cibao FC	2–3	2–3
Atlético Vega Real	1–10	Atlético de San Francisco	0–8	1–2

=== Finals ===
Tha final was played on 27 October 2018.

Team 1	Score	Team 2
Cibao FC	1–0	Atlético de San Francisco
