= Université Publique de l'Artibonite aux Gonaïves =

- Type: Public
- Established: 5 January 2007; 19 years ago
- Rector: Jean Odile Étienne
- Students: 1,400
- Location: Gonaïves, Haiti; 19.448°N 72.685°W
- Website: https://www.upag.edu.ht/

The Université Publique de l'Artibonite aux Gonaïves (French pronunciation: [ynivɛʁsite pyblik də laʁtibɔnit o ɡɔnaiv], UPAG) is a public institution of higher education located in Gonaïves, Haiti founded on 5 January 2007.

Its enrollment for 2016–2017 reached more than 1,400 students. UPAG has a staff of more than 80 professors (full-time/part-time) and more than 45 administrative staff. The university maintains cooperation with the national academia with a network of public sister universities in Les Cayes, Port-de-Paix, Jacmel, Cape, Fort-Liberté, Miragoâne, Jérémie and Hinche, as well as with Quisqueya University. Internationally, the university plans to formalize a partnership with the University of Massachusetts (UMASS) in Boston and the Florida State University (FSU) in Tallahassee.
