= Shaven Paul =

Jamaican footballer (born 1991)

Personal information
- Full name: Shaven Sean Paul
- Date of birth: 11 March 1991 (age 35)
- Place of birth: Kingston, Jamaica, Jamaica
- Height: 1.85 m (6 ft 1 in)
- Position: Goalkeeper

Senior career*
Years	Team	Apps	(Gls)
2009–2010	Highgate United		
2010–2014	Portmore United	13	(0)
2014–2015	Barbican	2	(0)
2015–2020	Portmore United	95	(0)
2021–2022	Mount Pleasant FA	8	(0)
Total		118	(0)

International career
2017–2018	Jamaica	2	(0)
- * Club domestic league appearances and goals

Shaven Sean Paul (born 11 March 1991) is a Jamaican former footballer who played as a goalkeeper.

== Career ==
Born in Kingston, Jamaica, Paul played for Highgate United, Portmore United, Barbican and Mount Pleasant FA.

He earned two caps for the Jamaica national team.
