= Coupe d'Haïti =

Haitian football tournament

- Organiser(s): Haitian Football Federation
- Founded: 1937; 89 years ago
- Region: Haiti
- Teams: 8
- Related competitions: Ligue Haïtienne

The Coupe d'Haïti is the premier elimination tournament of the Ligue Haïtienne.

== Finals ==
Finals so far:

=== Coupe Borno ===
- 1927 : Violette AC
- 1928 : Violette AC
- 1929 : Violette AC
- 1930 : Violette AC

=== Coupe Vincent ===
- 1932 : Union des Sociétés Artibonitiennes (Gonaïves)
- 1937 : Etoile Haïtienne (Port-au-Prince)
- 1937–38 : AS Capoise (Cap-Haïtien)
- 1939 : Violette AC (Port-au-Prince)
- 1941 : Racing CH (Port-au-Prince)
- 1942 : Excelsior AC (Port-au-Prince)
- 1944 : Racing CH (Port-au-Prince)
- 1945 : Racing CH (Port-au-Prince)
- 1947 : Hatüey Bacardi Club (Port-au-Prince)
- 1949 : Hatüey Bacardi Club (Port-au-Prince)
- 1950 : Excelsior AC (Port-au-Prince)
- 1951–52 : Violette AC (Port-au-Prince)

=== Coupe la Couronne ===
•1954 : Violette AC (Port-au-Prince)

=== Coupe Vincent (cont.) ===
- 1954 : Victory SC (Port-au-Prince)
- 1960 : Aigle Noir AC (Port-au-Prince)
- 1962 : Victory SC (Port-au-Prince)

=== Coupe F. Duvalier ===
- 1968 : Violette AC (Port-au-Prince)

=== Coupe Vincent (cont.) ===
- 1970 : Victory SC (Port-au-Prince)
- 1971 : Victory SC (Port-au-Prince)

=== Coupe Solange Figaro ===
- 1976 : Tempête FC 1-0 Baltimore SC

=== Coupe Caterpillar ===
- 1978 : Violette AC

=== Fraternité Léogâne ===
- 1988 : Tempête FC 2-1 AS Carrefour
- 1989 : Tempête FC 1-0 Racing de Gonaïves

=== Super Coupe d'Haïti ===
- 1992 : Don Bosco FC Tempête FC [presumably played late 1993]
- 2005 : Tempête FC 2-1 AS Mirebalais 1-0 AS Saint-Louis

=== Super Huit (Coupe Digicel) ===
- 2006 : Baltimore SC 1-1 Racing CH (5-4 pen)
- 2007 : Tempête FC 3-0 Zénith FC
- 2008 : AS Mirebalais 1-1 Baltimore SC (4-3 pen) [Final Feb 21, 2009]
- 2009 : AS Capoise 1-1 Baltimore SC (Baltimore SC dns for pen)

=== Super Huit (Coupe Digicel) (cont.) ===
- 2010 : Victory SC
- 2010–11 : Aigle Noir AC 2-0 AS Mirebalais
- 2011 : AS Capoise 0-0 Tempête FC (5-4 pen)
- 2012 : Tempête FC 2-0 FICA
- 2013 : Baltimore SC 0-0 Racing Club Haïtien (5-4 pen)
- 2014 : America FC 2-1 AS Mirebalais
