= Roulado FC =

Haitian football club

Roulado FC de la Gonave
- Full name: Roulado Football Club de la Gonâve
- Founded: 4 August 1989; 36 years ago
- Ground: Parc Savil Dessaint
- Capacity: 5000
- Chairman: Lovinsky Rambeau
- Manager: Fritzner Monplaisir
- League: Championnat National D2
- 2016: Ligue Haïtienne, 16th

Roulado Football Club de la Gonâve is a professional football club based in Gonâve Island, Haiti. The team was promoted to the top division of football in Haiti in 2014. It plays at two stadiums. The primary stadium, Parc Savil Dessain is located at the countryside of the island and Picse Macsi Stadium, a substitute stadium, is located at Anse-à-Galets.

A notable player is former Haiti international forward Jean-Robert Menelas who, as of 2008, had become all-time leading goalscorer in the Haitian top division during 14 years playing for Roulado, his only club.

== Honours ==
- Ligue Haïtienne
  - Champions (2): 2002 Ouverture, 2003 Clôture

== International competitions ==
- CFU Club Championship: 1 appearance

2001 – second round – Group B – 3rd place – 1 pt (stage 2 of 2)
