= Inter de Bayaguana =

Inter RD
- Full name: Inter de Bayaguana
- Ground: Estadio Bayaguana, Bayaguana
- Capacity: 1,000
- League: Primera División de Republica Dominicana
- 2018: 11th
Home colours	Away colours

Bayaguana FC is a football team based in Bayaguana, Dominican Republic. Currently playing in the Liga Dominicana de Fútbol from 2018.

== Stadium ==
Currently the team plays at the 1000 capacity Estadio Bayaguana.
