= Savannah S.C. =

Jamaican football club

- Full name: Savannah Sports Club
- Founded: 2007
- Ground: Frome Sports Club; Savanna-la-Mar, Jamaica
- Capacity: 2,000
- Chairman: Denzil Winslow
- Manager: Everton Tomlinson
- League: Western Confederation Super League
- 2011/2012: Champions

Savannah Sports Club is a Jamaican football club.

The team is based in Savanna-la-Mar, Jamaica, with their home ground at the Frome Sports Club.

== History ==
Only founded in 2007, Savannah were promoted to the Western Confederation Super League in 2011 and their subsequent success in the season resulted in promoting again.

=== Recent seasons ===
The club's debut in the Jamaica National Premier League in 2012 was met with success at their inaugural league match and the next two matches to follow. They then dropped 10 places in the table, coach Patrick Graham's resignation followed in November 2012. On 7 April 2013, their relegation was confirmed by a 1–2 loss against Montego Bay United.
