= US Lajeune =

Haitian football club

- Full name: Union Sportive Lajeune de Pignon
- Founded: 18 July 2007; 19 years ago
- Ground: Parc Saint Joseph
- Capacity: 1000
- Manager: Emmanuel Georges
- League: Championnat National D2
- 2015: Ligue Haïtienne, 19th (relegated)
Away colours

Union Sportive Lajeune de Pignon is a professional football club based in Pignon, Haiti.
