= AS Sud-Est =

Haitian football club

- Full name: Association Sportive Sud-Est
- Founded: 28 February 2015; 11 years ago
- Ground: Parc Pinchinat de Jacmel
- Chairman: Garvens Jean-Lucien
- Manager: Fritznel Baudellaire
- League: Ligue Haïtienne
- 2016: Championnat National D2 (promoted)

Association Sportive Sud-Est (or simply AS Sud-Est or ASSE) is a professional football club based in Sud-Est, Haiti. The club was the 2016 Division 2 Championship (Championnat d'Ascension), and quickly elevated to Division 1 in less than two years since its founding. Former Senator, Senator Edwin (Edo) Zenny is honorary President.

== History ==
The Association Sportive Sud-Est was founded on 28 February 2015. It won the Division 2 and was promoted to Division 1 after the 2016 season. Its first match in D1 came against América des Cayes, where the match ended in a 1–1 draw. Its first win in the top division came against Tempête FC on 18 March 2017 ending the match 0–3.
