= PNH FC =

Haitian football club

- Full name: Police Nationale d'Haïti; Football Club
- Ground: Stade Sylvio Cator
- Capacity: 15,000
- Coordinates: 18°32′9.81″N 72°20′32.79″W
- League: Championnat National D2
- 2015: Ligue Haïtienne, 18th (relegated)
Away colours

Police Nationale d'Haïti Football Club is a professional football club based in Port-au-Prince, Haiti.
