= Highgate United F.C. (Jamaica) =

Jamaican football club

Highgate United
- Full name: Highgate United F.C.
- Nickname: 45
- Ground: Lynch Park, Buff Bay; Portland, Jamaica
- Capacity: 2,000
- President: Von Bish
- Manager: Michael Beckford
- League: Jamaica National Premier League
- 2012–2013: 11th (relegated)
Home colours

Highgate United F.C. is a Jamaican football team playing in the second tier of Jamaican football.

It is based in Highgate, St Mary's, but plays in Jamaica National Premier League home games in Buff Bay, Portland.

== History ==
=== Recent seasons ===
Highgate clinched promotion to the top level in June 2011 under guidance of Calvin Lewis. Lewis was then lured to Portmore United prompting Highgate to line-up Braxton Hyre as interim before Michael Beckford took over. They entered the Premier League recruiting seven players from relegated St George's and three from relegated Benfica.

Highgate were themselves relegated after the 2012/13 season.

== Achievements ==
- Promoted to Premier League 2011
- Eastern Confederation Super League Champion

== Head coaches ==
- (Jamaica) Calvin Lewis
- (Jamaica) Michael Beckford
