= Inter de Grand-Goâve =

Haitian football club

Inter GG
- Full name: Inter de Grand-Goâve
- Founded: 2 November 2000; 26 years ago
- Ground: Parc Ferrus
- Chairman: Clervens Brassieur
- Manager: Judelin Renoir
- League: Championnat National D2
- 2016: Ligue Haïtienne, 17th
Away colours

Inter de Grand-Goâve (commonly known as Inter GG or simply Inter) is a professional football club based in Grand-Goâve, Haiti.
