= Ouanaminthe FC =

Haitian football club

- Full name: Ouanaminthe Football Club
- Founded: 19 June 2011; 15 years ago
- Ground: Parc Notre Dame
- Chairman: Frédéric Antoine-Marie
- Manager: Jules Réginald
- League: Ligue Haïtienne
- 2016: Ligue Haïtienne, 4th
Home colours	Away colours

Ouanaminthe Football Club is a professional football club based in Ouanaminthe, Haiti.

== History ==
The club was founded in 2011 as 9 Capitaines, and then renamed to Les Capitaines; until finally renaming to its current name in April 2014 by recommendation of the Haitian Football Federation. Ouanaminthe FC mostly recently qualified for the 2024 Caribbean Cup, via their winning of Group B of the 2023-24 Ligue Haitienne.
