= Aigle Noir AC =

Haitian football club

- Full name: Aigle Noir Athlétic Club
- Founded: 27 June 1951; 75 years ago
- Ground: Stade Sylvio Cator
- Capacity: 15,000
- Head coach: Giuliano Philippe
- League: Championnat National D2
- 2016: Ligue Haïtienne, 15th (relegated)
- Website: http://aiglenoirac.com
Home colours	Away colours

Aigle Noir Athlétic Club (French pronunciation: [ɛɡl nwaʁ], English: Black Eagle) commonly referred to as Aigle Noir, is a professional football club based in Bel Air, Port-au-Prince, Haiti.

== History ==
The club was founded on 27 June 1951 as Aigle Noir Athlétique Club.

Since the 2010 Haiti earthquake, the club is currently playing in the Stade Sylvio Cator until their home field, Parc de la Paix, is rebuilt.

== Honours ==
- Ligue Haïtienne: 4

1953, 1955, 1970, 2006 F

- Coupe d'Haïti: 1

1960

== International competitions ==
- CONCACAF Champions League: 3 appearances

1971 – withdrew
1972 – unknown results
1984 – First Round (Caribbean 1984) Lost against (Netherlands Antilles) Victory Boys, 0–1

- CFU Club Championship: 1 appearance

2006 – First Round – 4th in Group A – 0 pt (stage 1 of 3)

== Current squad ==
Note: Flags indicate national team as defined under FIFA eligibility rules; some limited exceptions apply. Players may hold more than one non-FIFA nationality.

No.	Pos.	Nation	Player
3		HAI	Stanley Certeau
4		HAI	Flavien Poivre
5		HAI	Jimbo Lefebvre
6		HAI	Alexis Poussaint
7		HAI	Yann Vasseur
9		HAI	Fritzroy Barbot
12		HAI	Jacques Delamière

No.	Pos.	Nation	Player
15		HAI	Paul Jean-Marc
16		HAI	Simon Letellier
17		HAI	Dany Thibault
18		HAI	Eddy Silvère
20		HAI	Kilian Léger
22		HAI	Mick Lacroix
24		HAI	Breck Chartier
