= Football Inter Club Association =

Association football club in Haiti

FICA
- Full name: Football Inter Club Association
- Nickname: La Colombe
- Founded: 17 October 1972; 53 years ago
- Ground: Parc Saint-Victor
- Capacity: 7,500
- Coach: John Sévère
- League: Ligue Haïtienne
- 2021: Ligue Haïtienne, 1st
- Website: https://ficaofficiel.com/home-page/

Football Inter Club Association; (commonly referred to as FICA) is a professional football club based in Cap-Haïtien, Haiti.

The club has been a very successful club in Haitian football history, winning 7 titles in 1989, 1990, 1991, 1994, 1998, 2001, 2015 C.

== History ==
The Football Inter Club Association (FICA) was founded on 17 October 1972 in a room at the Collège Notre-Dame du Perpétuel Secours on the initiative of a group of young students, all originally from Cap-Haïtien, following a national football school championship and the return of a victorious tour in the Dominican Republic.

As president was chosen Dudré Génard, as general secretary Paul Calixte and as treasurer Rev. Yvon Joseph C.S.C. and Eddie Figaro; the technical guide was entrusted to Hervé Calixte and Charles Vertilis. The first players of FICA were Daniel Albert, Ricot St-Juste, Frantzy Mathieu, Joseph Duverglas, Serge Célestin, Jean Robert Télusma, René Monestime, Daniel Cadet, Antony Byas, Robert Noel, Frantz Telusmond, Gary César, Jocelyn Zépherin, Killick Jean-Louis, Claude Louis Charles, Michel Desravines, Guy Prosper and Wilfrid Zépherin.

On November 26 of that year, FICA played their inaugural match against Etoile Haïtienne at the Parc Saint-Victor of Cap-Haïtien and was defeated 0–1. The next day, a rematch was held with FICA defeating Etoile Haïtienne 1–0 scored by Wilfrid Zépherin.

In 1973, FICA became affiliated with the "Ligue du Nord" (League of the North), and the club took part in its first championship, where they came in second.

In 1975, FICA becomes champions of the Ligue du Nord. From 1976 to 1983, FICA becomes champions of Cap-Haïtien three times, winning the "Coupe Pharmacie du Centre" in 1976, and the "Coupe Henry Christophe" in 1979 and 1983.

=== National integration era ===
During the season 1988–1989, the national of championship integrated clubs outside of the Port-au-Prince area with the twenty best clubs of the country in a league-wide format for the first time. Clubs were divided into two groups of ten, as the preliminary phase saw four teams play the final phase: Violette, Aigle Rouge, AS Capoise and FICA.

FICA defeated ASC, as Violette defeated Aigle Rouge in the semifinals. FICA won the first leg against Violette 1–0 in Cap-Haïtien and returned to Port-au-Prince and defeated Violette 1–2 to win its first national championship.

== Squad ==
As of 24 April 2021:

Note: Flags indicate national team as defined under FIFA eligibility rules; some limited exceptions apply. Players may hold more than one non-FIFA nationality.

No.	Pos.	Nation	Player
1	GK	HAI	Romondt, Guerry
6	MID	HAI	Fabrice, Jules Monfiston
7	FW	HAI	Bocius, Joseph Stanley

No.	Pos.	Nation	Player
15	MF	HAI	Alcime, Wilson
17	DF	HAI	Jacob, Jevely
18	FW	HAI	Jean, Roberto

== Records ==
=== Top goalscorers ===
As of 17 October 2018

#	Player	Careers	Goals	Ref
1	Golman Pierre	1995-2005	109	

== Honours ==
- Ligue Haïtienne: 7

1989, 1990, 1994, 1998, 2001, 2015 C, 2016 C.

== International competitions ==
- CONCACAF Champions League: 2 appearances

1990 – Second Round (Caribbean Zone) - Lost against (Cuba) Pinar del Río, 1–4 on aggregate (1–1 & 0–3)
1995 – Second Round (Caribbean Zone) - Withdrew
