= Éclair AC =

Haitian football club

- Full name: Éclair Athlétique Club des Gonaïves
- Founded: 5 July 1951; 73 years ago
- Ground: Parc Vincent
- Manager: Ralph Saint-Jean
- League: Ligue Haïtienne
- 2016: Championnat National D2 (promoted)
Away colours

Éclair Athlétique Club des Gonaïves (commonly known as Éclair des Gonaïves, Éclair AC or simply Éclair) is a professional football club based in Gonaïves, Haiti.
