= Zénith FC =

Haitian football club

Zénith
- Full name: Zénith Football Club
- Ground: Parc Saint-Victor
- Capacity: 10,000
- League: Championnat National D3
- 2014: Championnat National D2 (relegated)

Zénith Football Club is a professional football club based in Cap-Haïtien, Haiti.

== Current squad ==
Note: Flags indicate national team as defined under FIFA eligibility rules; some limited exceptions apply. Players may hold more than one non-FIFA nationality.

No.	Pos.	Nation	Player
—	GK	(Haiti) HAI	Montrevil Frantzy
—	GK	(Haiti) HAI	Dieudonne Morency
—	DF	(Haiti) HAI	Luckenson Chery
—	FW	(Haiti) HAI	Ryan Coble
