= Gonaïves =

Gonaives Gonaibo (Arawakan Name) , Gonayiv (Haitian Creole)
- Commune in Haiti
- Les Gonaïves
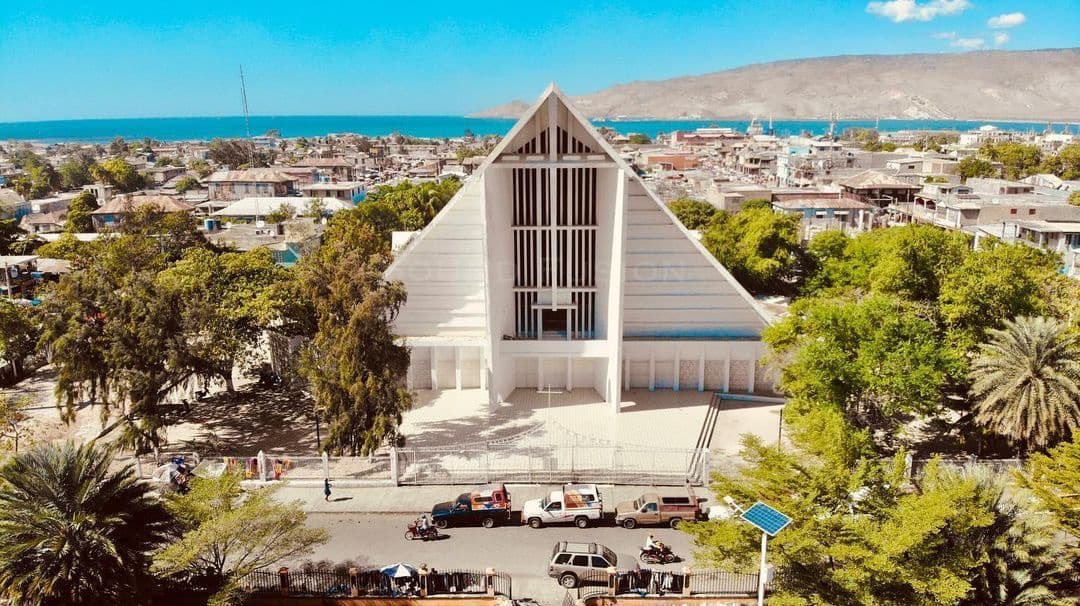
- Gonaïves, Haiti

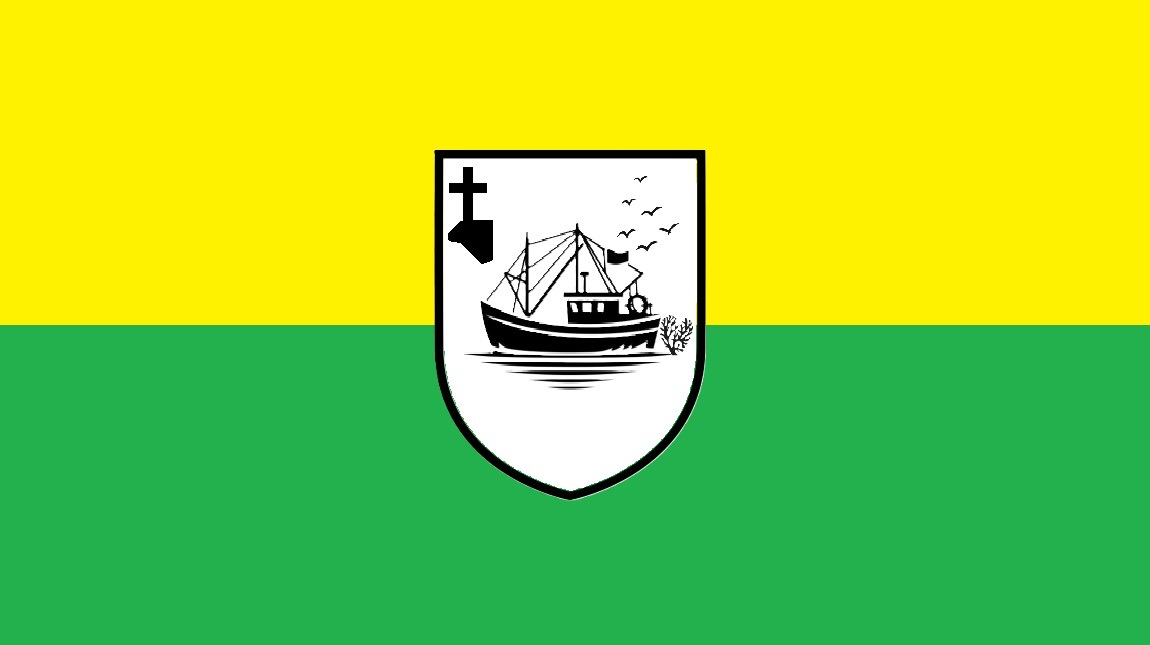
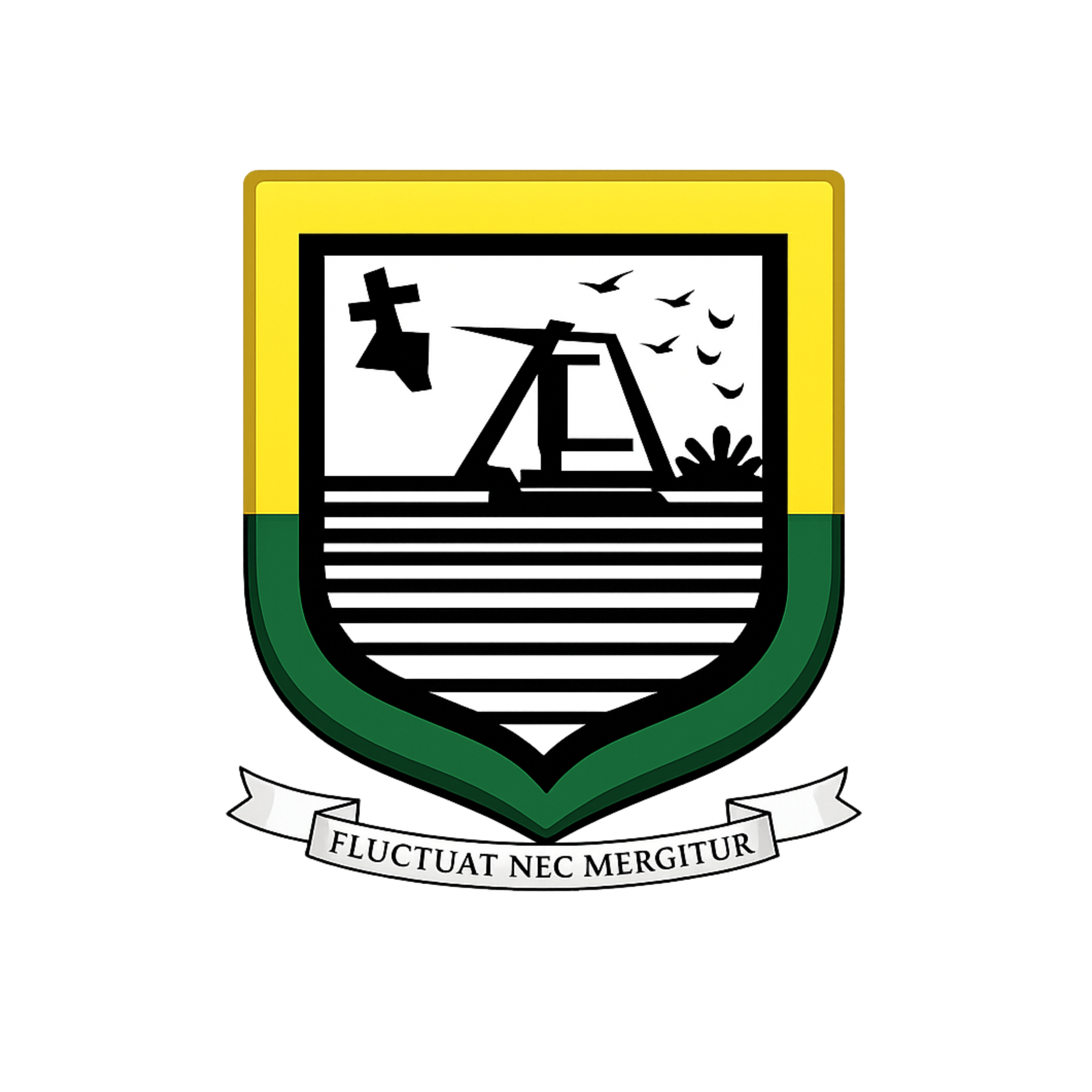
- Flag Seal
- Nickname: La Cité de l'Indépendance; The City of Independence, G-City.
- Interactive map of Gonaives
- Location in Haiti
- Coordinates: 19°26′44″N 72°41′18″W
- Country: Haiti
- Department: Artibonite
- Commune: Gonaives

Government
  - Mayor: Marc E. Berthaud

Area
  - Total: 573.58 km^{2} (221.46 sq mi)
- Elevation: 6 m (20 ft)

Population (2015)
  - Total: 356,324
  - Density: 621.23/km^{2} (1,609.0/sq mi)
- Time zone: UTC−05:00 (EST)
  - Summer (DST): UTC−04:00 (EDT)
- Postal code: HT 4110

Gonaïves (French: [ɡɔnaiv]; also Les Gonaïves; Haitian Creole: Gonayiv, pronounced [ɡonajiv]) is a commune in northern Haiti, and the capital of the Artibonite department of Haiti. The population was 356,324 at the 2015 census.

== History ==
The city of Gonaïves was founded around 1422 by a group of Taíno, who named it Gonaibo (to designate a locality of cacicat of the Jaragua). The Gulf of Gonâve is named after the town.

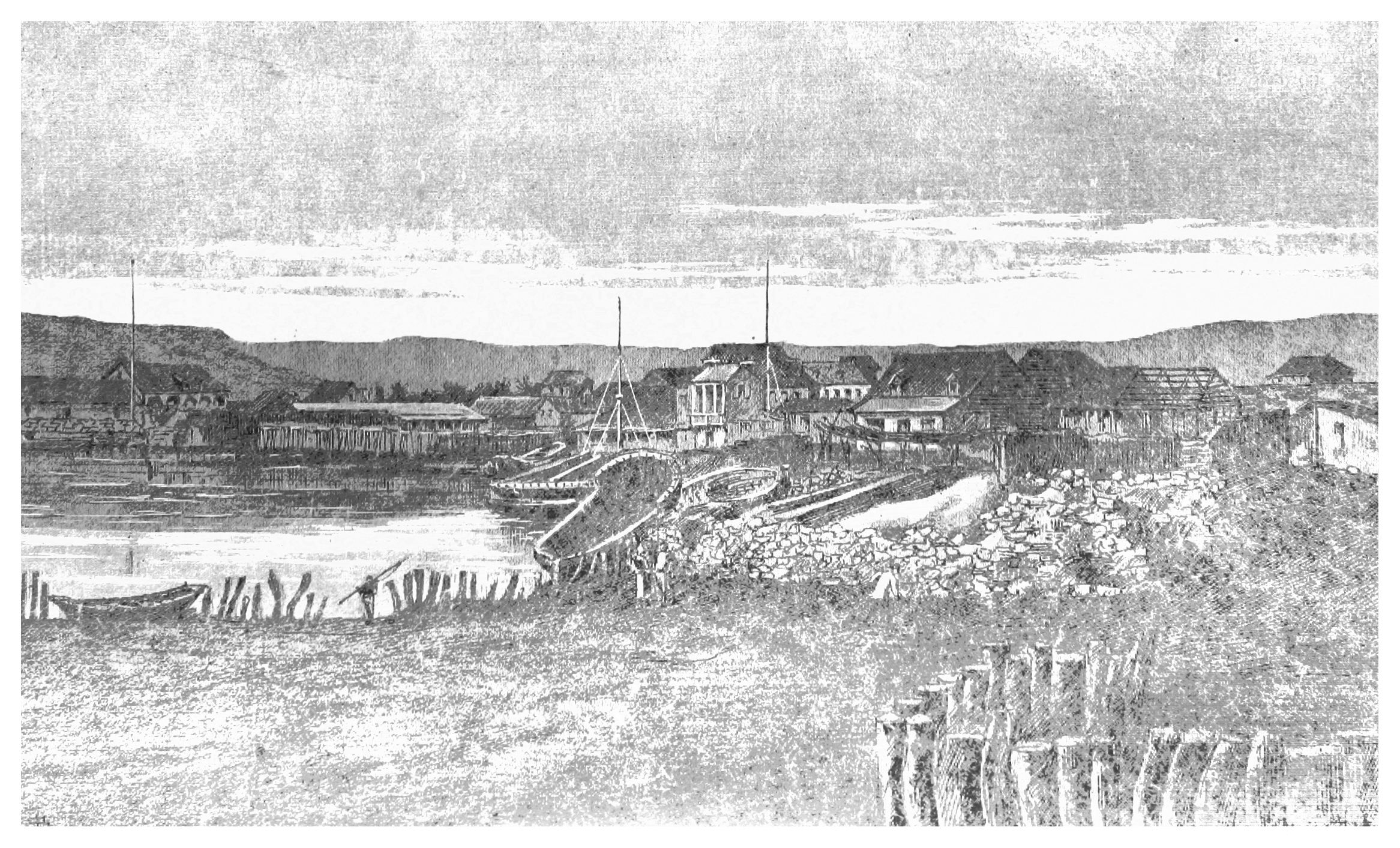
Gonaives before 1892

In 1802, an important battle of the Haitian Revolution, the Battle of Ravine-à-Couleuvres was fought near Gonaïves.

Gonaïves is also known as Haiti's city of independence, because it was the location of Jean-Jacques Dessalines declaring Haiti independent from France on January 1, 1804, by reading the Act of Independence, drafted by Boisrond Tonnerre, on the Place d'Armes of the town. Marie-Claire Heureuse Félicité, the wife of Jean-Jacques Dessalines, died here in August 1858.

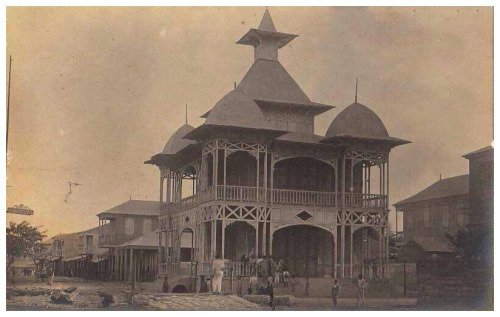
Gonaïves's Centennial Palace, a pavilion celebrating the hundredth anniversary of Haiti's independence, in 1904

In the early 2000s, Gonaïves was the scene of substantial rioting and violence motivated primarily by opposition to President Jean-Bertrand Aristide, and on February 5, 2004, a group calling itself the Revolutionary Artibonite Resistance Front seized control of the city, starting the 2004 Haïtian rebellion. But in recent years, the city has seen a complete return to order.

Even compared with other Haitian port cities, Gonaïves has long been vulnerable to hurricanes due to its location in a flood plain and due to the surrounding unforested mountains. In September 2004, Hurricane Jeanne caused major flooding and mudslides in the city. Four years later, the city was again devastated by another storm, Hurricane Hanna, which killed 529 people, mostly in flooded sections of Gonaïves, where the destruction was described as "catastrophic" and 495 bodies were discovered as late as September 5. Haitian authorities said the tally would grow once officials were able to make their way through the city. "The assessment was only partial, because it was impossible to enter the city at that moment". Gonaïves Mayor Stephen Moise said at least 48,000 people from the Gonaïves area were forced into shelters.

In 2020, President Jovenel Moïse skipped a traditional visit to Gonaïves during a climate of violence. According to local media, an armed group targeted Prime Minister Ariel Henry's visit on 1 January 2022, resulting in one death and two injuries.

== Education ==
=== University ===
Gonaïves has a variety of training centers including the Université Publique de l'Artibonite aux Gonaïves (UPAG); and The Law and Economics School of Gonaïves.

== Health ==
Gonaïves is home to the recently renovated La Providence Hospital.

== Sport ==
Gonaïves has some major league teams including Eclair AC and Racing FC (Gonaïves).

== Media ==
- Radio SuperXtraL'unique 94.1 FM
- Radio Motivation Fm Listen Live - 95.5 MHz FM, Gonaïves, Haiti
- Radio Boss Haiti 103.9 FM - The Radio of the moment.
- Radio Redemption 100.9 FM
- Radio Xplosion 96.5 FM
- Radio Tele Satellite FM - 100.5 FM
- Tele Radio new star fm 99.9 Chaine 13
- Radio Continentale 99.5 FM
- Radio Sun 91.3 FM
- Radio Independence 101.5 FM stations affiliées: radio Metropole 100.1, Lavwadlamerik
- Radio Mega Max 95.9 FM
- Radio Kiss FM 96.9
- Radio Provinciale 95.3 FM
- Radio Pyramide FM
- Radio Trans-Artibonite
- Radio Gonaïves 97.7 FM
- Radio Trans Atlantique 102.5 FM
- Radio Etincelle
- Radio Nouvelle Vision Chrétienne
- Radio Intrepide 97.3 FM
- Radio Tambou FM
- Radio Express FM
- Radio Classic Inter FM
- Radio 4VEG FM
- Radio Espace FM
- Radio KL 2000 FM
- Radio Super Vision FM
- Radio Megamax FM
- Radio Main Dans La Main FM
- Radio Clarté 103.9 FM
- Radio Vision 2000 98.1 FM
- Radio Télé 2004 (101.1FM)
- Radio Zetwa 89.1 Fm La Gonave

== Notable people ==
- Ralph Chapoteau
- Frantz Jean-Charles (born 1968), retired footballer
- Marie-Denise Fabien Jean-Louis (born 1944), physician and politician
- Ti Manno
- Maurice Sixto
- Jean-Euphèle Milcé

== External links and further reading ==
- Latortue, Paul R., "Gonaives: the last 50 years" Caribbean Studies, Vol. 34, Núm. 1, enero-junio, 2006, pp. 263–274 University of Puerto Rico, Puerto Rico
