= Petit-Goâve FC =

Professional football club based in Haiti

- Full name: Petit-Goâve Football Club
- Founded: 2011
- Ground: Parc Anglade
- Capacity: 2000
- Chairman: Berthony Perrinaud
- Coach: Wadson Voltaire
- League: Ligue Haïtienne
- 2016: Ligue Haïtienne, 9th
- Website: http://aspgclub.webs.com/

Petit-Goâve Football Club (formerly Association Sportive Petit-Goâve) is a professional football club based in Haiti. As of 2015, they play in the top flight league of Haiti.

== History ==
The club was founded in 2011 as Association Sportive Petit-Goâve before undergoing a change in 2014 to its current name.
