= Real Hope FA =

Association football club in Haiti

- Full name: Real Hope Football Academy
- Nickname: Real du Cap
- Founded: 14 March 2014; 11 years ago
- Ground: Parc Saint-Victor
- Capacity: 10,000
- Chairman: Gener Pierre
- Manager: Eyma Jean
- League: Ligue Haïtienne
- 2024: Ligue Haïtienne, Champions
- Website: https://realhopefa.com/
Away colours

Real Hope Football Academy (French: Académie de football Real Hope) is a professional football club based in Cap-Haïtien, Haiti.

== History ==
Real Hope Football Academy was formed by former Vice President from AS Capoise (located in Cap-Haïtien), who decided to create a football club and founded Real Hope Football Academy on 14 May 2014.

Real started in Division 3 and was quickly promoted to Division 2 the following year in 2015. After being crowned champions of the 2015 season, the club was promoted to the top-tier Division 1, in just its second year of existence. Real Hope FA mostly recently qualified for the 2024 Caribbean Cup, via their winning of Group A of the 2023-24 Ligue Haitienne. Real Hope secured qualification to the 2025 CONCACAF Champions by finishing 3rd in the 2024 Caribbean Cup, where they lost 7-0 on aggregate to Cruz Azul in the Round of 32.
