= AS Capoise =

Association football club in Haiti

ASC
- Full name: Association Sportive Capoise
- Nickname: Vieux Coq Capois
- Founded: 30 November 1930; 94 years ago
- Ground: Parc Saint-Victor
- Capacity: 10,000
- Chairman: Moïse Henriette
- Manager: Gervais Ancienne
- League: Ligue Haïtienne
- 2025: Vice-champions
| Home colours | Away colours | Third colours |

Association Sportive Capoise (French pronunciation: [asɔsjɑsjɔ̃ spɔʁtiv kapwaz]; commonly referred to as AS Capoise or simply ASC) is a professional football club based in Cap-Haïtien, Haiti.

== Honours ==
- Ligue Haïtienne: 3

1997, 2017 C, 2018 O

- Coupe d'Haïti: 3

1938, 2009, 2011

== International competitions ==
- CONCACAF Champions League: 2 appearances

1991 – Second Round (Caribbean) – Lost against (Guadeloupe) L'Etoile de Morne-à-l'Eau 4 – 1 on aggregate (stage 2 of 7)
1995 – Second Round (Caribbean) – Withdrew

== Crests ==
The current AS Capoise crest

The original AS Capoise crest

== Current squad ==
Note: Flags indicate national team as defined under FIFA eligibility rules; some limited exceptions apply. Players may hold more than one non-FIFA nationality.

| No. | Pos. | Nation | Player |
|---|---|---|---|
| 1 | GK | HAI | Clervin Yves Marie |
| 2 | | HAI | Gustave Reynaldo |
| 3 | | HAI | Joseph Wilfrid |
| 4 | | HAI | Jean Eyma |
| 5 | | HAI | Innocent Ronel Saurel |
| 6 | | HAI | Vimar Walky |
| 7 | | HAI | Tanis Sivenson |
| 8 | | HAI | Doreus Sandro |
| 9 | | HAI | Pierre Wadson |
| 10 | | HAI | Jean Jacqueson |
| 11 | | HAI | Jean Emmanuel |
| 12 | | HAI | Regis Alex |
| 13 | | HAI | Louis Jonas Jr |

| No. | Pos. | Nation | Player |
|---|---|---|---|
| 14 | | HAI | Noravin Toussaint |
| 15 | | HAI | Joseph Baptiste |
| 16 | | HAI | Auguste Daniel |
| 17 | | HAI | Jean Williance |
| 18 | | HAI | Atis Norlinx |
| 19 | | HAI | Saint Juste Mackenzie |
| 20 | | HAI | Florestal Kesnel |
| 21 | | HAI | Garçon Peterson |
| 22 | | HAI | Cherfils Peguy |
| 23 | | HAI | Sardouin Antoine |
| 24 | | HAI | Pierre Mondésir |
| 25 | | HAI | Cileus Lesca |
