= Parc Saint-Victor =

Football stadium in Cap-Haïtien, Haiti

Coordinates: 19.7536°N 72.2075°W

- Interactive map of Parc Saint-Victor
- Full name: Parc Saint-Victor
- Location: Cap-Haïtien, Haiti
- Capacity: 10,000
- Surface: Grass

Tenants
- AS Capoise; Real Hope FA; Zénith

Parc Saint-Victor is a football stadium in Cap-Haïtien, Haiti. It is the home stadium of AS Capoise, Real Hope FA and Fica of the Ligue Haïtienne. The stadium holds 10,000 spectators.
