= 2020 Ligue Haïtienne =

Ligue Haïtienne
- Season: 2020
- Champions: None
- Relegated: None

The 2020 Ligue Haïtienne was the 57th season of the Ligue Haïtienne, the top-tier football league in Haiti. The league Championnat National Haïtien Professionnel was supposed to be split into two tournaments — the Série d'Ouverture and the Série de Clôture — each with identical formats and each contested by the same 18 teams. The season began on 29 February 2020.

On 20 March, the season was suspended due to the COVID-19 pandemic. On 2 July, the season was declared abandoned.

== Teams ==
Locations of the 2020 Ligue Haïtienne season teams

Due to unrest in the country, last season was ended before all the matches were played. It was decided that none of the club from last year's edition of the competition would be relegated.

Two clubs from the Haitian second-level leagues were promoted for this season: Juventus and US Rivartibonitienne. This means the league for this season has expended from 16 to 18 clubs.

Club	City	Stadium	Capacity
América	Les Cayes, Sud	Parc de Foot Land des Gabions des Cayes	2,000
Arcahaie FC	Arcahaie, Ouest	Parc National du Drapeau	1,000
Baltimore SC	Saint-Marc, Artibonite	Parc Levelt	5,000
AS Capoise	Cap-Haïtien, Nord	Parc Saint-Victor	9,500
Cavaly AS	Léogâne, Ouest	Parc Julia Vilbon	1,000
Cosmopolites SC	Delmas, Ouest	Parc Larco	
Don Bosco FC	Pétion-Ville, Ouest	Stade Pétion-Ville	5,000
FICA	Cap-Haïtien, Nord	Parc Saint-Victor	9,500
Juventus FC	Les Cayes, Sud		
AS Mirebalais	Mirebalais, Centre	Centre Sportif Bayas	
Ouanaminthe FC	Ouanaminthe, Nord-Est	Parc Notre Dame	
Racing Club Haïtien	Port-au-Prince, Ouest	Stade Sylvio Cator	20,000
Racing FC	Gonaïves, Artibonite	Parc Stenio Vincent	
Real Hope FA	Cap-Haïtien, Nord		
US Rivartibonitienne	Petite Rivière de l'Artibonite, Artibonite		
Tempête FC	Saint-Marc, Artibonite	Parc Levelt	5,000
Triomphe	Liancourt, Artibonite	Parc Mercinus Deslouches	
Violette AC	Port-au-Prince, Ouest	Stade Sylvio Cator	20,000

== Série d'Ouverture ==
=== Regular season ===
The season was abandoned after four rounds were played.

==== Standings ====
Pos	Team	Pld	W	D	L	GF	GA	GD	Pts	Qualification or relegation
1	Baltimore	4	3	1	0	5	0	+5	10	Advance to Playoffs (Semifinals)
2	Cavaly	4	3	1	0	7	3	+4	10	Advance to Playoffs (Semifinals)
3	Don Bosco	4	2	1	1	6	2	+4	7	Advance to Playoffs (Quarterfinals)
4	Capoise	4	2	0	2	4	2	+2	6	Advance to Playoffs (Quarterfinals)
5	Real Hope	4	2	0	2	4	3	+1	6	Advance to Playoffs (Quarterfinals)
6	Triomphe	4	2	0	2	4	3	+1	6	Advance to Playoffs (Quarterfinals)
7	Rivartibonitienne	4	2	0	2	2	2	0	6	
8	FICA	4	2	0	2	2	3	−1	6	
9	Juventus	4	1	2	1	3	3	0	5	
10	Violette	4	1	2	1	3	3	0	5	
11	Arcahaie	4	1	2	1	2	3	−1	5	
12	Cosmopolites	4	1	2	1	2	3	−1	5	
13	Mirebalais	4	1	2	1	1	2	−1	5	
14	América	4	1	1	2	3	4	−1	4	
15	Ouanaminthe	4	1	1	2	1	4	−3	4	
16	Racing FC	4	1	1	2	1	5	−4	4	
17	Racing Club Haïtien	4	1	0	3	1	3	−2	3	
18	Tempête	4	1	0	3	2	5	−3	3	

Updated to match(es) played on 19 March 2020. Source: Soccerway

==== Results ====
Home \ Away	AME	ARC	BAL	CAP	CAV	COS	DON	FIC	JUV	MIR	OUA	RCH	RFC	RHO	RIV	TEM	TRI	VIO
América					2–2											0–1		
Arcahaie										0–0			1–0					
Baltimore											3–0				1–0			0–0
Capoise		2–0															2–0	
Cavaly								1–0								2–1		
Cosmopolites					0–2									2–1				
Don Bosco				1–0									4–0					
FICA												1–0			1–0			
Juventus			0–1				1–1											
Mirebalais						0–0						1–0						
Ouanaminthe				1–0					0–0									
Racing Club Haïtien	0–1															1–0		
Racing FC						0–0					1–0							
Real Hope								2–0										0–1
Rivartibonitienne	1–0						1–0											
Tempête																	0–2	
Triomphe										2–0				0–1				
Violette		1–1							1–2									

Updated to match(es) played on 19 March 2020. Source: RSSSF
Legend: Blue = home team win; Yellow = draw; Red = away team win.

=== Playoffs ===
Quarterfinals
4
5
3
6

Semifinals
1
2

Final

==== Quarterfinals ====
Team 1	Agg.	Team 2	1st leg	2nd leg
	–		–	–
	–		–	–

==== Semifinals ====
Team 1	Agg.	Team 2	1st leg	2nd leg
	–		–	–
	–		–	–

==== Finals ====
Winner qualifies for 2021 Caribbean Club Championship.

Team 1	Agg.	Team 2	1st leg	2nd leg
	–		–	–

== Série de Clôture ==
=== Regular season ===
A decision was made to transition the league to a fall-to-spring schedule. Due to this decision, this competition was cancelled.

==== Standings ====
Pos	Team	Pld	W	D	L	GF	GA	GD	Pts	Qualification or relegation
1	Real Hope	0	0	0	0	0	0	0	0	Advance to Playoffs (Semifinals)
2	Capoise	0	0	0	0	0	0	0	0	Advance to Playoffs (Semifinals)
3	Arcahaie	0	0	0	0	0	0	0	0	Advance to Playoffs (Quarterfinals)
4	Tempête	0	0	0	0	0	0	0	0	Advance to Playoffs (Quarterfinals)
5	Don Bosco	0	0	0	0	0	0	0	0	Advance to Playoffs (Quarterfinals)
6	Racing FC	0	0	0	0	0	0	0	0	Advance to Playoffs (Quarterfinals)
7	América	0	0	0	0	0	0	0	0	
8	Baltimore	0	0	0	0	0	0	0	0	
9	Violette	0	0	0	0	0	0	0	0	
10	Triomphe	0	0	0	0	0	0	0	0	
11	Mirebalais	0	0	0	0	0	0	0	0	
12	Ouanaminthe	0	0	0	0	0	0	0	0	
13	Racing Club Haïtien	0	0	0	0	0	0	0	0	
14	FICA	0	0	0	0	0	0	0	0	
15	Cavaly	0	0	0	0	0	0	0	0	
16	Cosmopolites	0	0	0	0	0	0	0	0	
17	Juventus	0	0	0	0	0	0	0	0	
18	Rivartibonitienne	0	0	0	0	0	0	0	0	

Updated to match(es) played on pre-season. Source: Soccerway

==== Results ====
Home \ Away	AME	ARC	BAL	CAP	CAV	COS	DON	FIC	JUV	MIR	OUA	RCH	RFC	RHO	RIV	TEM	TRI	VIO
América																		
Arcahaie																		
Baltimore																		
Capoise																		
Cavaly																		
Cosmopolites																		
Don Bosco																		
FICA																		
Juventus																		
Mirebalais																		
Ouanaminthe																		
Racing Club Haïtien																		
Racing FC																		
Real Hope																		
Rivartibonitienne																		
Tempête																		
Triomphe																		
Violette																		

Updated to match(es) played on pre-season. Source: RSSSF
Legend: Blue = home team win; Yellow = draw; Red = away team win.

=== Playoffs ===
Quarterfinals
4
5
3
6

Semifinals
1
2

Final

==== Quarterfinals ====
Team 1	Agg.	Team 2	1st leg	2nd leg
	–		–	–
	–		–	–

==== Semifinals ====
Team 1	Agg.	Team 2	1st leg	2nd leg
	–		–	–
	–		–	–

==== Finals ====
Winner qualifies for 2021 Caribbean Club Championship.

Team 1	Agg.	Team 2	1st leg	2nd leg
	–		–	–

== Trophée des Champions ==
Played between champions of Série d'Ouverture and Série de Clôture. This was cancelled.

== Aggregate table ==
Due to the league's disruption, there was no promotion into or relegation out of the league this season.

Pos	Team	Pld	W	D	L	GF	GA	GD	Pts	Qualification or relegation
1	Baltimore	4	3	1	0	5	0	+5	10	Caribbean Club Championship (Note: As top team for the season played.)
2	Cavaly	4	3	1	0	7	3	+4	10	
3	Don Bosco	4	2	1	1	6	2	+4	7	
4	Capoise	4	2	0	2	4	2	+2	6	
5	Real Hope	4	2	0	2	4	3	+1	6	
6	Triomphe	4	2	0	2	4	3	+1	6	
7	Rivartibonitienne	4	2	0	2	2	2	0	6	
8	FICA	4	2	0	2	2	3	−1	6	
9	Juventus	4	1	2	1	3	3	0	5	
10	Violette	4	1	2	1	3	3	0	5	
11	Arcahaie	4	1	2	1	2	3	−1	5	
12	Cosmopolites	4	1	2	1	2	3	−1	5	
13	Mirebalais	4	1	2	1	1	2	−1	5	
14	América	4	1	1	2	3	4	−1	4	
15	Ouanaminthe	4	1	1	2	1	4	−3	4	
16	Racing FC	4	1	1	2	1	5	−4	4	
17	Racing Club Haïtien	4	1	0	3	1	3	−2	3	
18	Tempête	4	1	0	3	2	5	−3	3	

Updated to match(es) played on 19 March 2020. Source: Soccerway Soccerway
