= 2011 Ligue Haïtienne season =

Ligue Haïtienne
- Season: 2011
- Champions: Ouverture: Baltimore SC (4th title); Clôture: Tempête (5th title)
- Relegated: Triomphe; Racing FC
- CFU Club Championship: Baltimore SC

The 2011 Ligue Haïtienne season was the 48th year of top-tier football in Haiti. It began on 1 May 2011. The league is split into two tournaments—the Série de Ouverture and the Série de Clôture—each with identical formats and each contested by the same 15 teams.

The league contracted from 16 to 15 clubs for this season.

== Teams ==
Don Bosco, Eclair, Violette and Dynamite finished in 13th through 16th place in the overall table at the end of last season and were relegated to the Haitian second-level leagues. They were replaced by the two Haitian second level group winners: North Group winner Triomphe and South Group winner Valencia.

During the offseason, FICA took legal action against the Haitian Football Federation (FHF) for a spot in the league. In a ruling handed down on 28 April 2011, only days before the season began, the Court of Arbitration for Sport (CAS) ruled in favor of FICA, meaning they would be included in this season's competition.

Team	Home city	Home ground
Aigle Noir	Port-au-Prince	Stade Sylvio Cator
América des Cayes	Cayes	
Baltimore SC	Saint-Marc	Parc Levelt
AS Capoise	Cap-Haïtien	Parc Saint-Victor
Carrefour	Carrefour	
Cavaly	Léogâne	Stade Sylvio Cator
FICA	Cap-Haïtien	
Mirebalais	Mirebalais	
Racing CH	Port-au-Prince	Stade Sylvio Cator
Racing FC	Gonaïves	Parc Stenio Vincent
St Louis du Nord	Saint-Louis-du-Nord	
Tempête	Saint-Marc	Parc Levelt
Triomphe	Liancourt	
Valencia	Léogâne	
Victory SC	Jacmel	

== Série de Ouverture ==
Ligue Haïtienne Ouverture
- Season: 2011
- Champions: Baltimore SC (4th title)
- Matches played: 105
- Goals scored: 166 (1.58 per match)
- Biggest home win: Carrefour 7-0 Racing FC
- Biggest away win: Triomphe 0-2 Racing CH; Victory 0-2 Baltimore
- Highest scoring: América des Cayes 5-2 Valencia; Carrefour 7-0 Racing FC

The 2011 Série de Ouverture began on 1 May 2011 and ended on 12 August 2011.

=== Standings ===
Pos	Team	Pld	W	D	L	GF	GA	GD	Pts	Qualification
1	Baltimore SC (C)	14	8	6	0	14	2	+12	30	Trophée des Champions 2012 CFU Club Championship (Note: The champions of the 2010 Série de Clôture (Victory), 2011 Série de Ouverture (Baltimore) and 2011 Série de Clôture (Tempête) played each other in a triangular group to decide which two would represent Haiti in the 2012 CFU Club Champion's Cup, with Victory and Baltimore prevailing.)
2	Victory Sportif Club	14	8	3	3	16	6	+10	27	
3	Capoise	14	8	1	5	13	11	+2	25	
4	América des Cayes	14	6	4	4	18	12	+6	22	
5	Aigle Noir	14	5	4	5	10	11	−1	19	
6	Mirebalais	14	5	3	6	8	10	−2	18 (Note: MIR 2-1 SLN; MIR 1-0 TEM; SLN 1-0 TEM)	
7	St Louis du Nord	14	5	3	6	9	10	−1	18	
8	Tempête	14	4	6	4	18	12	+6	18	
9	Cavaly	14	3	8	3	9	7	+2	17 (Note: CAV: 5 pts, 3-1; VAL: 5 pts, 1-0; FICA: 2 pts, 1-2; RFC: 2 pts, 0-2)	
10	Valencia	14	4	5	5	11	12	−1	17	
11	FICA	14	4	5	5	10	10	0	17	
12	Racing FC	14	4	5	5	9	18	−9	17	
13	Carrefour	14	3	6	5	11	10	+1	15	
14	Racing CH	14	3	4	7	6	12	−6	13	
15	Triomphe	14	3	1	10	4	23	−19	10	

Source: FIFA.com
Rules for classification: 1) points; 2) head-to-head points; 3) head-to-head goal difference; 4) head-to-head goals scored; 5) goal difference; 6) number of goals scored.
(C) Champions
Notes:

2011 Série de Ouverture champions
Baltimore SC
4th title

=== Results ===
Home \ Away	AGN	ACY	BAL	CAP	CAR	CAV	FIC	MIR	RCH	RFC	SLN	TEM	TRL	VAL	VSC
Aigle Noir			0–0	2–1	1–0		0–0			1–1	0–1		2–0		
América des Cayes	3–2			0–1				1–0	2–0			1–0	4–0	5–2	
Baltimore SC		0–0		3–0		1–0	1–0		0–0	1–0	1–0			2–0	
Capoise					2–0	1–0	1–0				1–0	0–0	1–0	2–0	
Carrefour		0–0	1–1						1–0	7–0		0–0			0–0
Cavaly	0–1	1–1			0–0			3–1	1–0	2–0			0–0		0–0
FICA		1–0			2–0	1–1		1–0			1–1		1–0		1–2
Mirebalais	1–0		0–0	1–0	0–0					2–0	2–1	1–0			
Racing CH	1–0			1–2			0–0	1–0				1–1		0–0	0–1
Racing FC		1–1		2–1			0–0		1–0		0–0		3–0	0–0	1–0
St Louis du Nord		1–0			1–0	0–0			3–0 (Note: This match was awarded to St. Louis du Nord 3-0.)			1–0			0–1
Tempête	3–0		1–1			1–1	3–2			3–0			4–0	1–1	
Triomphe			0–1		1–2			1–0	0–2		1–0			1–0	0–3
Valencia	0–0				2–0	0–0	1–0	2–0			3–0 (Note: This match was award to Valencia 3-0.)				0–1
Victory Sportif Club	0–1	3–0	0–2	2–0				0–0				3–1			

Source: FIFA.com
Legend: Blue = home team win; Yellow = draw; Red = away team win.

== Série de Clôture ==
Ligue Haïtienne Clôture
- Season: 2011
- Champions: Tempête (5th title)
- Matches played: 105
- Goals scored: 171 (1.63 per match)
- Biggest home win: América des Cayes 10-1 Racing FC
- Biggest away win: Aigle Noir 0-4 Tempête
- Highest scoring: América des Cayes 10-1 Racing FC

The 2011 Série de Clôture began on 11 September 2011 and ended on 11 December 2011.

=== Standings ===
Pos	Team	Pld	W	D	L	GF	GA	GD	Pts	Qualification
1	Tempête (C)	14	9	4	1	20	7	+13	31	Trophée des Champions (Note: The champions of the 2010 Série de Clôture (Victory), 2011 Série de Ouverture (Baltimore) and 2011 Série de Clôture (Tempête) played each other in a triangular group to decide which two would represent Haiti in the 2012 CFU Club Champion's Cup, with Victory and Baltimore prevailing.)
2	Victory Sportif Club	14	6	6	2	15	6	+9	24	
3	Cavaly	14	6	4	4	9	9	0	22 (Note: CAV 1-0 BAL)	
4	Baltimore SC	14	6	4	4	12	9	+3	22	
5	Racing CH	14	5	6	3	20	13	+7	21	
6	FICA	14	5	5	4	10	6	+4	20 (Note: FICA 1-0 AGN; FICA 1-0 VAL; AGN 0-0 VAL)	
7	Valencia	14	5	5	4	11	6	+5	20	
8	Aigle Noir	14	6	2	6	7	9	−2	20	
9	Carrefour	14	4	5	5	12	13	−1	17 (Note: CAR 2-0 SLN; SLN 1-0 CAP; CAR 0-0 CAP)	
10	St Louis du Nord	14	5	2	7	8	13	−5	17	
11	Capoise	14	3	8	3	8	6	+2	17	
12	América des Cayes	14	4	4	6	16	11	+5	16	
13	Mirebalais	14	3	6	5	8	9	−1	15	
14	Triomphe	14	4	2	8	7	22	−15	14	
15	Racing FC	14	1	3	10	8	32	−24	6	

Rules for classification: 1) points; 2) head-to-head points; 3) head-to-head goal difference; 4) head-to-head goals scored; 5) goal difference; 6) number of goals scored.
(C) Champions
Notes:

2011 Série de Clôture Champions
Tempête
5th title

=== Results ===
Home \ Away	AGN	ACY	BAL	CAP	CAR	CAV	FIC	MIR	RCH	RFC	SLN	TEM	TRL	VAL	VSC
Aigle Noir		0–0				0–1		1–0	2–0			0–4		0–0	1–0
América des Cayes			0–1		0–0	0–1	0–0			10–1	2–1				1–0
Baltimore SC	1–0				1–0			1–1				0–1	2–0		0–0
Capoise	0–1	1–0	0–0					2–0	0–1	2–0					0–0
Carrefour	1–0			0–0		2–1	0–3	0–0			2–0		3–0	1–2	
Cavaly			1–0	0–0			1–0				1–0	0–1		1–0	0–0
FICA	1–0		0–1	0–0					1–0	2–0		1–1		1–0	
Mirebalais		1–0				0–0	1–0		0–0				3–0	1–1	0–1
Racing CH		1–1	3–2		2–2	1–1				5–1	3–0		2–0		
Racing FC	0–1		1–1		0–0	4–1		0–0				1–2			
St Louis du Nord	1–0		1–2	1–0			0–0	1–0		1–0			2–0	0–0	
Tempête		2–0		1–1	2–0			2–1	2–1		1–0				1–1
Triomphe	0–1	2–1		2–2		1–0	1–0			1–0		0–0			
Valencia		0–1	1–0	0–0					0–0	3–0		1–0	3–0		
Victory Sportif Club					2–1		1–1		1–1	3–0	2–0		3–0	1–0	

Legend: Blue = home team win; Yellow = draw; Red = away team win.

== Overall standings ==
Pos	Team	Pld	W	D	L	GF	GA	GD	Pts	Qualification or relegation
1	Baltimore SC	28	14	10	4	26	11	+15	52	2010–11 Super Huit
2	Victory Sportif Club	28	14	9	5	31	12	+19	51	2010–11 Super Huit
3	Tempête	28	13	10	5	38	19	+19	49	2010–11 Super Huit
4	Capoise	28	11	9	8	21	17	+4	42	2010–11 Super Huit
5	Cavaly	28	9	12	7	18	16	+2	39 (Note: CAV 0-1 AGN; AGN 0-1 CAV)	2010–11 Super Huit
6	Aigle Noir	28	11	6	11	17	20	−3	39	2010–11 Super Huit
7	América des Cayes	28	10	8	10	34	23	+11	38	2010–11 Super Huit
8	Valencia	28	9	10	9	22	18	+4	37 (Note: VAL 1-0 FICA; FICA 1-0 VAL)	2010–11 Super Huit
9	FICA	28	9	10	9	20	16	+4	37	
10	St Louis du Nord	28	10	5	13	17	23	−6	35	
11	Racing CH	28	8	10	10	26	25	+1	34	
12	Mirebalais	28	8	9	11	16	19	−3	33	
13	Carrefour	28	7	11	10	23	23	0	32	
14	Triomphe (R)	28	7	3	18	11	45	−34	24	Relegation to Haitian Second Levels
15	Racing FC (R)	28	5	8	15	17	50	−33	23	Relegation to Haitian Second Levels

Rules for classification: 1) points; 2) head-to-head points; 3) head-to-head goal difference; 4) head-to-head goals scored; 5) goal difference; 6) number of goals scored.
(R) Relegated

== Trophée des Champions ==
This match is contested between the winner of the Série de Ouverture and the winner of the Série de Clôture.

Team 1	Score	Team 2
Baltimore SC	0–0 (9–8 pen.)	Tempête

== 2011 Super Huit ==
The 2011 Super Huit competition (English: Super Eight) is a knockout tournament played at the end of the season among the clubs finishing in the top 8 of the overall standings for the season for cash prizes.
