= 2010–11 Ligue Haïtienne season =

Ligue Haïtienne
- Season: 2010–11
- Champions: Ouverture: Tempête (4th title); Clôture: Victory SC (1st title)
- Relegated: Don Bosco; Eclair; Violette; Dynamite
- 2011 CFU Club Championship: Tempête
- CONCACAF Champions League: Tempête (2011 CFU Club Championship runner-up)
- 2012 CFU Club Championship: Victory
- Matches: 240
- Goals: 422 (1.76 per match)

The 2010–11 Ligue Haïtienne season was the 47th season of top-tier football in Haiti. It began on 30 July 2010 and ended on 30 January 2011. The league is split into two tournaments—the Série de Ouverture and the Série de Clôture—each with identical formats and each contested by the same 16 teams.

== Teams ==
JS Capoise and ASPDIF finished in 15th and 16th place in the overall table at the end of last season and were relegated to the Haitian second level leagues. They were replaced by the two Haitian second level promotion playoff winners: Eclair and América des Cayes.

In addition, Aigle Noir and Racing FC finished in 13th and 14th place in the overall table at the end of last season and took part in promotion-relegation playoffs for their spots in the league against the runners-up of the second level promotion playoffs. These promotion-relegation playoffs were played as two matches, one at each club's stadium. Aigle Noir defeated Inter de Grand-Goave 2–1 on aggregate, while Racing FC defeated FICA 1–1 on aggregate, 1–0 on away goals. Thus, both clubs retained their spots in the league.

Team	Home city	Home ground
Aigle Noir	Port-au-Prince	Stade Sylvio Cator
América des Cayes		
Baltimore SC	Saint-Marc	Parc Levelt
AS Capoise	Cap-Haïtien	Parc Saint-Victor
Carrefour		
Cavaly	Léogâne	Stade Sylvio Cator
Don Bosco	Pétion-Ville	Stade Pétion-Ville
Dynamite	Saint-Marc	
Eclair	Gonaïves	
Mirebalais	Mirebalais	
Racing CH	Port-au-Prince	Stade Sylvio Cator
Racing FC	Gonaïves	Parc Stenio Vincent
St Louis du Nord		
Tempête	Saint-Marc	Parc Levelt
Victory SC	Jacmel	
Violette	Port-au-Prince	Stade Sylvio Cator

== Série de Ouverture ==
The 2010 Série de Ouverture began on 30 July 2010 and ended on 7 October 2010.

=== Standings ===
Pos	Team	Pld	W	D	L	GF	GA	GD	Pts	Qualification
1	Tempête (C)	15	10	5	0	23	7	+16	35	2011 CFU Club Championship
2	América des Cayes	15	8	3	4	13	11	+2	27	
3	Aigle Noir	15	7	5	3	15	12	+3	26	
4	Baltimore SC	15	7	4	4	18	12	+6	25	
5	Victory Sportif Club	15	6	6	3	15	11	+4	24	
6	Capoise	15	5	8	2	8	5	+3	23 (Note: CAP 2-1 CAR)	
7	Carrefour	15	5	8	2	16	10	+6	23	
8	Racing CH	15	6	4	5	11	10	+1	22	
9	Mirebalais	15	4	8	3	11	9	+2	20	
10	St Louis du Nord	15	3	7	5	11	12	−1	16	
11	Racing FC	15	4	3	8	8	15	−7	15	
12	Eclair	15	3	5	7	8	14	−6	14 (Note: CAV 0-1 ECG)	
13	Cavaly	15	3	5	7	8	13	−5	14	
14	Violette	15	2	5	8	10	16	−6	11	
15	Don Bosco	15	2	5	8	9	20	−11	11 (Note: DBC 2-2 DYN; DBC 1-1 VIO; VIO 2-1 DYN)	
16	Dynamite	15	2	5	8	9	16	−7	11	

Source: soccerway.com
Rules for classification: 1) points; 2) head-to-head points; 3) head-to-head goal difference; 4) head-to-head goals scored; 5) goal difference; 6) number of goals scored.
(C) Champions
Notes:

2010 Série de Ouverture champions

4th title

=== Results ===
Home \ Away	AGN	ACY	BAL	CAP	CAR	CAV	DBC	DYN	ECG	MIR	RCH	RFC	SLN	TEM	VSC	VIO
Aigle Noir		2–1	1–0	0–1				0–0		0–3			1–0		1–1	
América des Cayes			0–3 (Note: This match was awarded 0-3 to Baltimore due to América refusing to take the pitch.)				0–1		1–0		3–0 (Note: This match was originally scheduled to be played on October 4, but never began due to heavy rains. It was rescheduled for the following day, but América were awarded the match 3-0 after Racing CH failed to appear.)	1–0	1–0	1–1	1–0	1–0
Baltimore SC				1–0	1–1			1–0			1–1	1–1		0–2		1–0
Capoise		0–0			2–1	0–0	0–0	2–0			1–0		1–1	0–0		
Carrefour	0–0	4–1					2–0		1–1			1–0			2–1	1–1
Cavaly	0–2	0–1	0–3		0–0				0–1					0–0	0–1	1–0
Don Bosco	1–2		0–1			0–3		2–2	0–2			0–2			1–1	1–1
Dynamite		0–1			0–1	0–2			1–0		0–1	2–0	0–0			
Eclair	0–1		3–2	0–0						0–0	0–1	0–1	1–1		0–0	0–2
Mirebalais		0–0	2–1	0–0	0–0	1–0	1–1	1–1						1–3		
Racing CH	1–1				0–0	0–0	0–1			1–0		4–1	1–0			1–0
Racing FC	0–1			0–0		0–0				0–1			1–0			1–0
St Louis du Nord			0–1		1–1	4–2	2–1			1–0				0–0		1–1
Tempête	3–2				2–1		1–0	1–1	3–0		1–0	1–0				
Victory Sportif Club			1–1	2–0				2–1		0–0	1–0 (Note: This match was originally played on August 8, but was abandoned due to rain with Victory leading 2-0. This match was officially played on August 9.)	3–1	0–0	0–3		
Violette	1–1			0–1				2–1		1–1				1–2	0–2	

Source: soccerway.com
Legend: Blue = home team win; Yellow = draw; Red = away team win.

== Série de Clôture ==
The 2010 Série de Clôture began on 29 October 2010 and ended on 30 January 2011.

=== Standings ===
Pos	Team	Pld	W	D	L	GF	GA	GD	Pts	Qualification
1	Victory Sportif Club (C)	15	8	3	4	22	13	+9	27 (Note: VSC 3-1 ACY)	2012 CFU Club Championship (Note: The champions of the 2010 Série de Clôture (Victory), 2011 Série de Ouverture (Baltimore) and 2011 Série de Clôture (Tempête) played each other in a triangular group to decide which two would represent Haiti in the 2012 CFU Club Champion's Cup, with Victory and Baltimore prevailing.)
2	América des Cayes	15	8	3	4	22	10	+12	27	
3	Carrefour	15	6	7	2	17	12	+5	25	
4	Baltimore SC	15	6	6	3	14	9	+5	24	
5	St Louis du Nord	15	6	5	4	14	13	+1	23	
6	Cavaly	15	5	7	3	11	5	+6	22 (Note: TEM 1-1 CAV)	
7	Tempête	15	5	7	3	16	13	+3	22	
8	Mirebalais	15	5	6	4	13	11	+2	21	
9	Capoise	15	5	5	5	13	17	−4	20 (Note: CAP 2-0 RFC; DBC 1-2 CAP; RFC 0-0 DBC)	
10	Don Bosco	15	4	8	3	17	10	+7	20	
11	Racing FC	15	5	5	5	12	15	−3	20	
12	Violette	15	5	3	7	17	19	−2	18	
13	Aigle Noir	15	4	4	7	7	17	−10	16 (Note: AGN 1-0 ECG)	
14	Eclair	15	4	4	7	12	18	−6	16	
15	Racing CH	15	4	3	8	15	19	−4	15	
16	Dynamite	15	1	2	12	9	30	−21	5	

Source: soccerway.com
Rules for classification: 1) points; 2) head-to-head points; 3) head-to-head goal difference; 4) head-to-head goals scored; 5) goal difference; 6) number of goals scored.
(C) Champions
Notes:

2010–11 Série de Clôture Champions

1st title

=== Results ===
Home \ Away	AGN	ACY	BAL	CAP	CAR	CAV	DBC	DYN	ECG	MIR	RCH	RFC	SLN	TEM	VSC	VIO
Aigle Noir					0–0	0–2	0–0		1–0		1–0 (Note: This match began 20 November, but was abandoned with the scoreline at 1–0. The match was continued and finished from this point the next day.)	0–1 (Note: This match began 11 January, but was abandoned with the scoreline at 0–0. The match was continued and finished from this point on 20 January.)		0–0		2–1
América des Cayes	3–0 (Note: This match was awarded to América 3–0 due to Aigle Noir walking off the pitch in the 89th minute with the scoreline at 1–0.)			3–0	4–0	0–0		3–0 (Note: This match was awarded to América 3–0 due to Dynamite failing to appear for the match.)		1–0						
Baltimore SC	2–0	0–0				1–0	0–0		3–1	0–0			1–0		0–1	
Capoise	2–1		1–0						1–1	2–1	2–0				0–0	1–1
Carrefour			1–1	1–0		0–0		4–0		1–1	1–0		3–1	2–1		
Cavaly				2–0			0–0	2–1		0–0	0–0	2–0	0–1			
Don Bosco		0–1		1–2	1–1					3–0	1–1		4–0	2–2		
Dynamite	4–0		1–2	1–1			0–1			0–1				1–1	0–3	1–3
Eclair		0–1			1–0	0–0	0–2	4–0						2–1		
Mirebalais	1–0								1–0		3–1	1–1	0–0		3–0	1–1
Racing CH		2–0	2–1	4–1				1–0	1–2					0–0	0–3	
Racing FC		1–0	1–1		0–1		0–0	1–0	1–1		3–2			1–0	0–1	
St Louis du Nord	0–0	2–1		0–0				3–0	0–0		1–0	2–2			1–0	
Tempête		2–2	0–0	1–0		1–1				1–0			1–0		4–2	1–0
Victory Sportif Club	1–2	3–1			0–0	1–0	2–2 (Note: This match was abandoned with the scoreline at 2–2 due to loss of power at the ground. The scoreline was allowed to stand as the final result.)		4–0							1–0
Violette		0–2	1–2		2–2	0–2	1–0		2–0		2–1	2–0	1–3			

Source: soccerway.com
Legend: Blue = home team win; Yellow = draw; Red = away team win.

== Overall standings ==
Pos	Team	Pld	W	D	L	GF	GA	GD	Pts	Qualification or relegation
1	Tempête	30	15	12	3	39	20	+19	57	2010–11 Super Huit
2	América des Cayes	30	16	6	8	35	21	+14	54	2010–11 Super Huit
3	Victory Sportif Club	30	14	9	7	37	24	+13	51	2010–11 Super Huit
4	Baltimore SC	30	13	10	7	32	21	+11	49	2010–11 Super Huit
5	Carrefour	30	11	15	4	33	22	+11	48	2010–11 Super Huit
6	Capoise	30	10	13	7	21	22	−1	43	2010–11 Super Huit
7	Aigle Noir	30	11	9	10	22	29	−7	42	2010–11 Super Huit
8	Mirebalais	30	9	14	7	24	20	+4	41	2010–11 Super Huit
9	St Louis du Nord	30	9	12	9	25	25	0	39	
10	Racing CH	30	10	7	13	26	29	−3	37	
11	Cavaly	30	8	12	10	19	18	+1	36	
12	Racing FC	30	9	8	13	20	30	−10	35	
13	Don Bosco (R)	30	6	13	11	26	30	−4	31	Relegation to Haitian Second Levels
14	Eclair (R)	30	7	9	14	20	32	−12	30	Relegation to Haitian Second Levels
15	Violette (R)	30	7	8	15	27	35	−8	29	Relegation to Haitian Second Levels
16	Dynamite (R)	30	3	7	20	18	46	−28	16	Relegation to Haitian Second Levels

Source: soccerway.com
Rules for classification: 1) points; 2) head-to-head points; 3) head-to-head goal difference; 4) head-to-head goals scored; 5) goal difference; 6) number of goals scored.
(R) Relegated

=== Trophée des Champions ===
This match is contested between the winner of the Série de Ouverture and the winner of the Série de Clôture. This match took place on 5 February 2011.

Team 1	Score	Team 2
Tempête	2–0	Victory SC

== 2010–11 Super Huit ==
The 2010–11 Super Huit competition (English: Super Eight) is a knockout tournament played at the end of the season among the clubs finishing in the top 8 of the overall standings for the season for cash prizes. The competition normally uses a two-legged format for the quarterfinals and semifinals, but will use a single leg format throughout for this edition. This competition took place between 12 and 20 February 2011.

=== Quarterfinals ===
These matches took place on 12 and 13 February 2011.

Team 1	Score	Team 2
Baltimore SC	1–0	Carrefour
Aigle Noir^{1}	0–0 (p) 9–9	América des Cayes
Tempête	0–0 (p) 7–8	Mirebalais
AS Capoise	2–1	Victory SC

^{1}Aigle Noir won the match by a drawing of lots.

=== Semifinals ===
These matches took place on 16 and 17 February 2011.

Team 1	Score	Team 2
Aigle Noir^{2}	2–2 (p) 5–5	AS Capoise
Baltimore SC	0–0 (p) 2–4	Mirebalais

^{2}Aigle Noir won the match by a drawing of lots.

=== Final ===
This match took place on 20 February 2011.

Team 1	Score	Team 2
Aigle Noir	2–0	Mirebalais
