= 2019 Ligue Haïtienne =

Ligue Haïtienne
- Season: 2019
- Champions: Ouverture: Arcahaie (1st title); Clôture: Abandoned
- Highest attendance: 3,500 Violette AC vs Don Bosco FC

The 2019 Ligue Haïtienne is the 56th season of the Ligue Haïtienne, the top-tier football league in Haiti. The league Championnat National Haïtien Professionnel is split into two tournaments — the Série d'Ouverture and the Série de Clôture — each with identical formats and each contested by the same 16 teams. The season began on 2 March 2019.

Due to unrest in the country, no further matches were played after 22 September. The season was formally abandoned on 18 December.

== Teams ==
Locations of the 2019 Ligue Haïtienne season teams

At the end of the 2018 season, the bottom three teams in the aggregate table; AS Sud-Est, Valencia, and Petit-Goâve; were relegated to the Haitian second-level leagues. Replacing them were three clubs from the Haitian second-level leagues; Violette AC, Triomphe and América.

Club	City	Stadium
América	Les Cayes, Sud	Parc de Foot Land des Gabions des Cayes
Arcahaie FC	Arcahaie, Ouest	Parc National du Drapeau
Baltimore SC	Saint-Marc, Artibonite	Parc Levelt
AS Capoise	Cap-Haïtien, Nord	Parc Saint-Victor
Cavaly AS	Léogâne, Ouest	Parc Julia Vilbon
Cosmopolites SC	Delmas, Ouest	
Don Bosco FC	Pétion-Ville, Ouest	Parc Sainte-Thérèse
FICA	Cap-Haïtien, Nord	Parc Saint-Victor
AS Mirebalais	Mirebalais, Centre	Centre Sportif Bayas
Ouanaminthe FC	Ouanaminthe, Nord-Est	Parc Notre Dame
Racing Club Haïtien	Port-au-Prince, Ouest	Stade Sylvio Cator
Racing FC	Gonaïves, Artibonite	Parc Stenio Vincent
Real Hope FA	Cap-Haïtien, Nord	
Tempête FC	Saint-Marc, Artibonite	Parc Levelt
Triomphe	Liancourt, Artibonite	Parc Mercinus Deslouches
Violette AC	Port-au-Prince, Ouest	Stade Sylvio Cator

== Série d'Ouverture ==
=== Regular season ===
The regular season began on 2 March and ended on 19 May.

==== Standings ====
Pos	Team	Pld	W	D	L	GF	GA	GD	Pts	Qualification or relegation
1	Real Hope	15	9	4	2	14	7	+7	31	Advance to Playoffs (Semifinals)
2	Capoise	15	7	7	1	19	6	+13	28	Advance to Playoffs (Semifinals)
3	Arcahaie	15	6	6	3	15	8	+7	24	Advance to Playoffs (Quarterfinals)
4	Tempête	15	7	3	5	14	9	+5	24	Advance to Playoffs (Quarterfinals)
5	Don Bosco	15	6	5	4	22	14	+8	23	Advance to Playoffs (Quarterfinals)
6	Racing FC	15	6	5	4	13	13	0	23	Advance to Playoffs (Quarterfinals)
7	América	15	5	6	4	11	11	0	21	
8	Baltimore	15	4	8	3	11	10	+1	20	
9	Violette	15	2	13	0	13	8	+5	19	
10	Triomphe	15	4	5	6	10	14	−4	17	
11	Mirebalais	15	4	5	6	13	18	−5	17	
12	Ouanaminthe	15	3	6	6	14	16	−2	15	
13	Racing Club Haïtien	15	3	5	7	13	18	−5	14	
14	FICA	15	2	8	5	11	17	−6	14	
15	Cavaly	15	3	4	8	12	23	−11	13	
16	Cosmopolites	15	2	4	9	6	19	−13	10	

Source: Soccerway

==== Results ====
Home \ Away	AME	ARC	BAL	CAP	CAV	COS	DON	FIC	MIR	OUA	RCH	RFC	RHO	TEM	TRI	VIO
América		1–1			2–1		2–0	2–1	0–0	1–0	2–0					0–0
Arcahaie			1–1	2–0		1–0		0–0	1–0		1–0		2–0		0–1	
Baltimore	2–0								1–1	1–0		0–1	0–0		1–1	0–0
Capoise	3–1		0–0		3–1	4–0		0–0						1–0		1–1
Cavaly		0–3 (Note: Cavaly v Arcahaie was abandoned at 1-1 in the second half due to protests. The match was awarded to Arcahaie 0-3.)	1–1				2–1		2–2		0–0			3–0		0–4
Cosmopolites	0–0		0–1		0–1					3–2		1–1	0–1		0–1	
Don Bosco		0–0	3–1	0–0		3–0		5–1		2–0		2–0	0–2			
FICA			0–1		2–0	1–1				1–1		0–0	1–1	0–2		1–1
Mirebalais				0–3 (Note: Mirebalais v Capoise was abandoned in the 60th minute at 1-1. The match was awarded to Capoise 0-3.)		2–0	1–2	1–1						1–0	1–0	1–1
Ouanaminthe		2–1		0–0	0–0				4–1		2–1		1–2	0–0		
Racing Club Haïtien			1–1	1–1		0–1	2–2	1–0	2–1				0–1		4–1	
Racing FC	2–0	0–0		0–0	2–1				0–1	2–1	1–0					
Real Hope	1–0			0–2	1–0				1–0			2–0		1–0	0–0	1–1
Tempête	0–0	2–1	1–0			1–0	1–1				3–0 (Note: Tempête v Racing Club Haïtien was awarded to Tempête 3-0 after Racing Club Haïtien did not arrive for the match.)	3–0				
Triomphe	0–0			0–1	2–0		1–0	1–2		1–1		1–3				0–0
Violette		1–1				0–0	1–1			0–0	1–1	1–1		1–0		

Source: RSSSF
Legend: Blue = home team win; Yellow = draw; Red = away team win.

=== Playoffs ===
Quarterfinals
4	Tempête	0	2	2
5	Don Bosco	0	1	1
3	Arcahaie	0	1	1
6	Racing FC	0	0	0

Semifinals
1	Real Hope	1	1	2 (6)
4	Tempête	1	1	2 (5)
2	Capoise	0	2	2
3	Arcahaie	1	1	2 (a)

Final
1	Real Hope	0	1	1
3	Arcahaie	1	1	2

==== Quarterfinals ====
The first legs were played on 23 and 24 May and the second legs were played on 26 and 27 May.

Team 1	Agg.	Team 2	1st leg	2nd leg
Racing FC	0–1	Arcahaie	0–0	0–1
Don Bosco	1–2	Tempête	0–0	1–2

The first leg match between Don Bosco and Tempête was begun on 23 May, but the game was abandoned at halftime due to rain. The game was replayed the next day.

==== Semifinals ====
The first legs were played on 29 and 30 May and the second legs were played on 1 and 2 June.

Team 1	Agg.	Team 2	1st leg	2nd leg
Tempête	2–2; 5–6 (p)	Real Hope	1–1	1–1 (a.e.t.)
Arcahaie	2–2 (a)	Capoise	1–0	1–2

==== Finals ====
The first leg was played on 6 June and the second leg was played on 9 June. Winner qualifies for 2020 Caribbean Club Championship.

Team 1	Agg.	Team 2	1st leg	2nd leg
Arcahaie	2–1	Real Hope	1–0	1–1

== Série de Clôture ==
=== Regular season ===
The regular season began on 24 August.

==== Standings ====
Pos	Team	Pld	W	D	L	GF	GA	GD	Pts	Qualification or relegation
1	Don Bosco	4	4	0	0	8	3	+5	12	Advance to Playoffs (Semifinals)
2	Cavaly	5	3	1	1	9	3	+6	10	Advance to Playoffs (Semifinals)
3	Tempête	4	3	1	0	6	2	+4	10	Advance to Playoffs (Quarterfinals)
4	Violette	4	3	0	1	4	2	+2	9	Advance to Playoffs (Quarterfinals)
5	Baltimore	5	2	3	0	2	0	+2	9	Advance to Playoffs (Quarterfinals)
6	Capoise	5	2	2	1	4	2	+2	8	Advance to Playoffs (Quarterfinals)
7	Ouanaminthe	5	2	2	1	5	4	+1	8	
8	Triomphe	5	2	1	2	3	3	0	7	
9	Mirebalais	5	1	3	1	3	1	+2	6	
10	América	5	2	0	3	8	11	−3	6	
11	FICA	5	1	2	2	4	5	−1	5	
12	Arcahaie	5	0	4	1	1	3	−2	4	
13	Racing FC	5	1	1	3	3	9	−6	4	
14	Cosmopolites	5	1	0	4	3	7	−4	3	
15	Real Hope	5	0	2	3	1	4	−3	2	
16	Racing Club Haïtien	4	0	0	4	1	6	−5	0	

Updated to match(es) played on 22 September 2019. Source: Soccerway

==== Results ====
Home \ Away	AME	ARC	BAL	CAP	CAV	COS	DON	FIC	MIR	OUA	RCH	RFC	RHO	TEM	TRI	VIO
América												6–2	1–0			
Arcahaie					0–0							0–0				
Baltimore		0–0		0–0							1–0					
Capoise		3–1							0–0	0–1						
Cavaly	4–1											2–0				
Cosmopolites					0–2			1–0								0–1
Don Bosco	2–0										1–0					
FICA							0–1				1–0					
Mirebalais	3–0	0–0	0–1													
Ouanaminthe			0–0			2–1	2–3									
Racing Club Haïtien																
Racing FC													1–0		0–1	
Real Hope								1–1		0–0						
Tempête								1–1			3–1		1–0			
Triomphe						2–1			0–0					0–1		
Violette				0–1	2–1										1–0	

Updated to match(es) played on 22 September 2019. Source: RSSSF
Legend: Blue = home team win; Yellow = draw; Red = away team win.

=== Playoffs ===
Quarterfinals
4
5
3
6

Semifinals
1
2

Final

==== Quarterfinals ====
Team 1	Agg.	Team 2	1st leg	2nd leg
	–		–	–
	–		–	–

==== Semifinals ====
Team 1	Agg.	Team 2	1st leg	2nd leg
	–		–	–
	–		–	–

==== Finals ====
Winner qualifies for 2020 Caribbean Club Championship.

Team 1	Agg.	Team 2	1st leg	2nd leg
	–		–	–

== Trophée des Champions ==
Played between champions of Série d'Ouverture and Série de Clôture.

== Aggregate table ==
Due to the abandonment of the season, no clubs were relegated for next season.

Pos	Team	Pld	W	D	L	GF	GA	GD	Pts	Qualification or relegation
1	Capoise	20	9	9	2	23	8	+15	36	
2	Don Bosco	19	10	5	4	30	17	+13	35	Caribbean Club Championship (Note: As 2018 Série de Clôture champions.)
3	Tempête	19	10	4	5	20	11	+9	34	
4	Real Hope	20	9	6	5	15	11	+4	33	
5	Baltimore	20	6	11	3	13	10	+3	29	
6	Violette	19	5	13	1	17	10	+7	28	
7	Arcahaie	20	6	10	4	16	11	+5	28	Caribbean Club Championship (Note: As Série d'Ouverture champions.)
8	América	20	7	6	7	19	22	−3	27	
9	Racing FC	20	7	6	7	16	22	−6	27	
10	Triomphe	20	6	6	8	13	17	−4	24	
11	Ouanaminthe	20	5	8	7	19	20	−1	23	
12	Mirebalais	20	5	8	7	16	19	−3	23	
13	Cavaly	20	6	5	9	21	26	−5	23	
14	FICA	20	3	10	7	15	22	−7	19	
15	Racing Club Haïtien	19	3	5	11	14	24	−10	14	
16	Cosmopolites	20	3	4	13	9	26	−17	13	

Updated to match(es) played on 22 September 2019. Source: Soccerway Soccerway

== Attendances ==
The 2019 CHFP clubs sorted by average home league attendance:

#	Club	Average
1	Real Hope	738
2	Tempête	503
3	Baltimore SC	491
4	Capoise	488
5	Cavaly	472
6	Violette AC	462
7	Arcahaie	427
8	Ouanaminthe	358
9	Racing FC	361
10	FICA	334
11	Triomphe AC	299
12	Mirebalais	267
13	Don Bosco	248
14	América des Cayes	231
15	Valencia FC	221
16	Cosmopolites	183
Average per club		380
