= Finta =

Brazilian sports equipment manufacturer

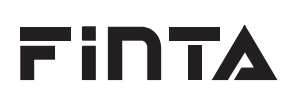
- Type: Public
- Industry: Sports equipment
- Founded: 1987; 39 years ago
- Headquarters: São Paulo, Brazil
- Area served: Brazil
- Key people: Fatima de Castro (Owner)
- Products: Football boots, balls, goalkeeper gloves, accessories
- Operating income: ▲US$ 10–50 million
- Website: finta.com.br

Finta is a Brazilian sports equipment manufacturing company based in São Paulo. The company produces football equipment, including boots, balls, goalkeeper gloves, and accessories (shin guards, bags)

In recent years, Finta also manufactured equipment for volleyball and basketball, including clothing.

== History ==
Finta is a Brazilian sports brand that has provided uniforms and sports equipment to large clubs since its founding in 1987. In this short period as a supplier, Finta has participated in the conquest of three Brazilian first division titles (Vasco in 1989, Corinthians in 1990, and Botafogo in 1995), also winning numerous second division titles (Juventude in 1994, Santa Cruz in 1999, and Paysandu in 2001) and second division runner-ups (Goiás in 1994, Botafogo in 2003, and Santa Cruz in 2005). Finta has also won two titles in the Brazilian third division (Novorizontino in 1994 and Remo in 2005), and two Supercopa Libertadores (Cruzeiro in 1991 and 1993). Paysandu The North won the Brazilian Champions Cup, gaining the right to participate in the 2003 Copa Libertadores. They also won a collective 42 state championships (Corinthians, Cruzeiro, Sport Recife, Paysandu, Goias, Vasco, MG America, Nautical, Ceará, Vila Nova, Santa Cruz, two tricampeonatos with Vasco and Goiás) in Brazilian association football.

Finta has over four thousand customers throughout Brazil. Finta's products are exported to Europe, Central America, South America, the Caribbean and Japan.

== Sponsorships ==
The following list of clubs are sponsored by Finta:

=== Association football ===
==== Associations ====
- (Haiti) Ligue Haïtienne

==== Clubs teams ====
- (Brazil) Brusque
- (Brazil) Sampaio Corrêa
- (Brazil) Tuna
- (Haiti) AS de Carrefour
- (Haiti) AS Cavaly
- (Haiti) AS Mirebalais
- (Haiti) Baltimore SC
- (Haiti) Dynamite AC
- (Haiti) US Frères
- (Haiti) Roulado FC
- (Haiti) Tempête FC
- (Haiti) Victory Sportif Club
- (Haiti) Violette AC
- (Japan) Ange Violet Hiroshima
- (Japan) Cento Cuore Harima FC
- (Japan) Renofa Yamaguchi
- (Trinidad and Tobago) Joe Public

== Past sponsorships ==
=== Association football ===
==== National teams ====
- Saint Vincent and the Grenadines (2002)
- Trinidad and Tobago (2006)

==== Club teams ====
- (Brazil) Araxá (2013–15)
- (Brazil) Confiança
- (Brazil) Botafogo (1989, 1995–97, 2002–04)
- (Brazil) Ceará
- (Brazil) Corinthians (1990–94)
- (Brazil) Cruzeiro (1990–1996, 2015)
- (Brazil) Goiás
- (Brazil) Juventude (2008)
- (Brazil) Novorizontino
- (Brazil) Paraná (1990–93, 1999–2002)
- (Brazil) Paysandu (2001–05, 2007–08)
- (Brazil) Ponte Preta (1999–2001)
- (Brazil) Santa Cruz (1998–2007)
- (Brazil) Vasco da Gama (1988–1994)
- (Brazil) Volta Redonda
- (Brazil) Vila Nova
- (Brazil) América (1997–2001, 2010–11)
- (Brazil) Náutico (1985–1991, 2001–05)
- (Brazil) Sport Recife (1973–74, 1991–94)
- (Argentina) Colegiales (2006–07)
- (Costa Rica) Alajuelense (2001-02)
- (Costa Rica) Santos
- (Japan) Thespakusatsu Gunma (2013-19)
- (South Korea) Ansan Greeners (2019–2020)
- (South Korea) Sangju Sangmu

=== Basketball (clubs) ===
- (Brazil) Franca

=== Volleyball (clubs) ===
- (Brazil) Minas Tênis Clube (2008–2013)
- (Brazil) Sada Cruzeiro (2010–13)
