= 2021 Caribbean Club Championship =

2021 CONCACAF Caribbean Club Championship
Tournament details
- Host country: Dominican Republic
- Dates: 15–25 May 2021
- Teams: 13 (from 11 associations)
- Venues: 2 (in 2 host cities)

Final positions
- Champions: (Haiti) Cavaly (1st title)
- Runners-up: (Suriname) Inter Moengotapoe
- Third place: (Puerto Rico) Metropolitan (Martinique) Samaritaine

Tournament statistics
- Matches played: 18
- Goals scored: 84 (4.67 per match)
- Top scorer(s): (Haiti) Gamaël Dorvil (Dominican Republic) Roberto Victoria (5 goals each)
- Best player: (Haiti) Gamaël Dorvil
- Best young player: (Haiti) Gamaël Dorvil
- Best goalkeeper: (Haiti) Emmanuel Saint-Félix
- Fair play award: (Suriname) Inter Moengotapoe

The 2021 Caribbean Club Championship (officially the 2021 Flow CONCACAF Caribbean Club Championship for sponsorship reasons) was the 23rd edition of the Caribbean Club Championship (also known as the CFU Club Championship), the first-tier annual international club football competition in the Caribbean region, held amongst clubs whose football associations are affiliated with the Caribbean Football Union (CFU), a sub-confederation of CONCACAF.

The tournament was played in the Dominican Republic between 15 and 25 May 2021. As a result of the cancellation of the 2021 CONCACAF Caribbean Club Shield due to the COVID-19 pandemic, the 2021 CONCACAF Caribbean Club Championship was expanded to include a number of teams originally set to participate in the 2021 CONCACAF Caribbean Club Shield.

The winners of the 2021 CONCACAF Caribbean Club Championship qualified to the 2022 CONCACAF Champions League, and the second, third and fourth place teams qualified to the 2021 CONCACAF League, as long as they comply with the minimum CONCACAF Club Licensing requirements for the CONCACAF Champions League or CONCACAF League.

Portmore United, having won the title in 2019, are the title holders. The 2020 edition was cancelled due to the COVID-19 pandemic and the title was not awarded.

== Teams ==
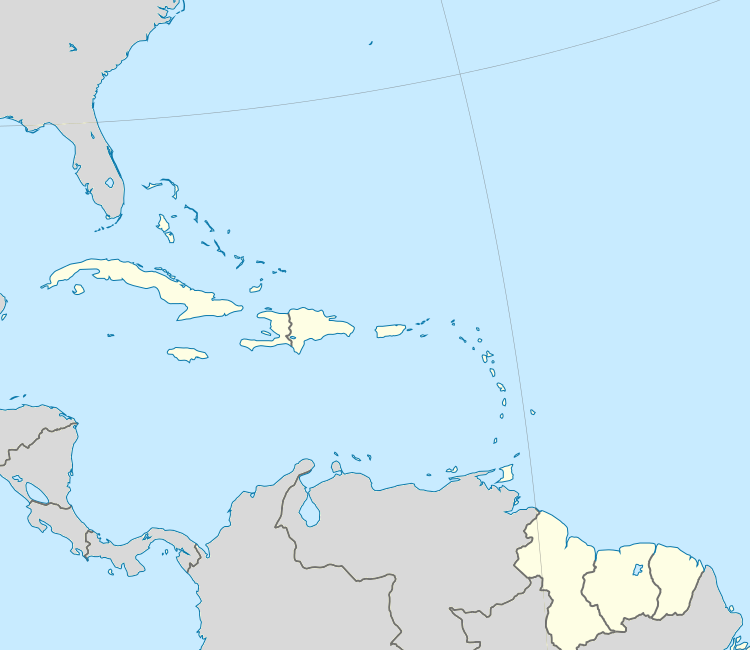
Location of teams of the 2021 CONCACAF Caribbean Club Championship
Red: Teams from professional leagues.
Green: Teams from non-professional leagues (originally entered 2021 CONCACAF Caribbean Shield).
(H) Hosts.
~~Withdrawn teams~~

A total of 13 teams from 11 associations entered the expanded 2021 CONCACAF Caribbean Club Championship.

- Among the 31 CFU member associations, four of them were classified as professional leagues and each may enter two teams in the CONCACAF Caribbean Club Championship. Before the expansion of the tournament, six teams from three associations originally entered. However, the two teams from Jamaica later withdrew, and only four teams from two associations (Dominican Republic and Haiti) entered the expanded tournament.
- Originally, a total of 14 teams from 14 associations which were classified as non-professional leagues entered the 2021 CONCACAF Caribbean Club Shield. After its cancellation, 9 of the 14 teams instead participated in the expanded 2021 CONCACAF Caribbean Club Championship. Initially, 11 teams would participate, but Racing Club Aruba (Aruba), South East (Dominica) and Platinum FC (Saint Lucia) withdrew, while Hope International (Saint Vincent and the Grenadines) were added.

Associations which enter two teams
Association	Team	Qualification method
Dominican Republic (hosts)	Universidad O&M	2020 Liga Dominicana de Fútbol champions
Dominican Republic (hosts)	Delfines del Este	2020 Liga Dominicana de Fútbol runners-up
Haiti	Cavaly	2019 Série de Clôture and 2020 Série d'Ouverture aggregate table best team
Haiti	Don Bosco	2019 Série de Clôture and 2020 Série d'Ouverture aggregate table 2nd best team

Associations which enter one team (originally entered the 2021 CONCACAF Caribbean Club Shield)
Association	Team	Qualification method (for 2021 CONCACAF Caribbean Club Shield)
Bonaire	Real Rincon	2018–19 Bonaire League champions
Curaçao	Scherpenheuvel	2019–20 Curaçao Promé Divishon champions
French Guiana	Olympique de Cayenne	2019–20 French Guiana Honor Division champions
Guadeloupe	Gosier	2019–20 Guadeloupe Division of Honor champions
Martinique	Samaritaine	2019–20 Martinique Championnat National champions
Puerto Rico	Metropolitan	2018–19 Liga Puerto Rico champions
Saint Vincent and the Grenadines	Hope International	2019–20 SVGFF Premier Division champions
Sint Maarten	Flames United	2020–21 Sint Maarten Senior League champions
Suriname	Inter Moengotapoe	2018–19 SVB Topklasse champions

Withdrawn teams
Association	Team	Qualification method (for 2021 CONCACAF Caribbean Club Shield if applicable)
Jamaica	Portmore United	2018–19 National Premier League champions
Jamaica	Waterhouse	2018–19 National Premier League runners-up
Aruba	Racing Club Aruba	2018–19 Aruban Division di Honor champions
Dominica	South East	2020 Dominica Premier League champions
Saint Lucia	Platinum FC	2019 SLFA First Division champions

Association with professional league whose teams did not enter

- Trinidad and Tobago

Notes

1. Haiti (HAI): The Série de Clôture of the 2019 Ligue Haïtienne season was abandoned due to the Haitian protests, and the Série d'Ouverture of the 2020 Ligue Haïtienne season was abandoned due to the COVID-19 pandemic in Haiti. The teams which represented the Haitian Football Federation in the 2021 Caribbean Club Championship were Cavaly and Don Bosco, the 2019 Série de Clôture and 2020 Série d'Ouverture aggregate table best two teams. Initially the Haitian Football Federation selected Capoise, the 2019 aggregate table leaders at the time of suspension, and Baltimore, the 2020 Série d'Ouverture leaders at the time of suspension, as their representatives, but this was rejected by CONCACAF.
2. Jamaica (JAM): The 2019–20 National Premier League was abandoned by the Jamaica Football Federation due to the COVID-19 pandemic in Jamaica. The season was declared null and void, and no champions were declared. The teams which would originally represent the Jamaica Football Federation in the 2021 Caribbean Club Championship were Portmore United and Waterhouse, the 2018–19 National Premier League champions and runners-up, but they later withdrew from the tournament.
3. Trinidad and Tobago (TRI): The 2019–20 TT Pro League was abandoned by the Trinidad and Tobago Football Association due to the COVID-19 pandemic in Trinidad and Tobago. Defence Force, which were the leaders at the time of abandonment, were declared champions, and La Horquetta Rangers finished as runners-up, but they did not enter the tournament.

== Venues ==
The matches were played at the Estadio Olímpico Félix Sánchez in Santo Domingo and Estadio Panamericano in San Cristóbal.

== Original format ==
Before the expansion of the tournament, the 2021 CONCACAF Caribbean Club Championship would originally be played at the Félix Sánchez Olympic Stadium in Santo Domingo, Dominican Republic, between 14 and 26 May 2021, and six teams from three associations entered. The original draw for the group stage was held on 25 February 2021, 11:00 EST (UTC−5), at the CONCACAF Headquarters in Miami, United States. The six teams were drawn into two groups of three. The two teams from hosts Dominican Republic were placed in Pot 1, the two teams from Haiti were placed in Pot 2, while the two teams from Jamaica were placed in Pot 3. This ensured that teams from the same association could not be drawn into the same group.

Pot 1 (hosts)	Pot 2	Pot 3
(Dominican Republic) Universidad O&M; (Dominican Republic) Delfines del Este	(Haiti) Cavaly; (Haiti) Don Bosco	(Jamaica) Waterhouse; (Jamaica) Portmore United

The original draw results and schedule were as follows:

- Group stage
  - Group A: (Dominican Republic) Universidad O&M, (Haiti) Cavaly, (Jamaica) Portmore United
    - 14 May 2021, 18:30: Universidad O&M v Cavaly
    - 16 May 2021, 18:30: Cavaly v Portmore United
    - 18 May 2021, 18:30: Universidad O&M v Portmore United
  - Group B: (Dominican Republic) Delfines del Este, (Haiti) Don Bosco, (Jamaica) Waterhouse
    - 14 May 2021, 21:00: Delfines del Este v Don Bosco
    - 16 May 2021, 21:00: Don Bosco v Waterhouse
    - 18 May 2021, 21:00: Delfines del Este v Waterhouse
- Knockout stage
  - Semi-finals
    - 21 May 2021, 18:30: Group A Winners v Group B Runners-up
    - 21 May 2021, 21:00: Group B Winners v Group A Runners-up
  - Third place match
    - 23 May 2021, 17:00: Semi-final 1 Losers v Semi-final 2 Losers
  - Final
    - 23 May 2021, 20:00: Semi-final 1 Winners v Semi-final 2 Winners
  - CONCACAF League playoff
    - 26 May 2021, 20:00: Club Championship 4th place v Club Shield Winners

== Group stage ==
After the expansion of the tournament, the new draw for the group stage was held on 23 April 2021, 11:00 EDT (UTC−4), at the CONCACAF Headquarters in Miami, United States. The 15 teams were drawn into four groups: three groups of four teams (Groups A–C) and one group of three teams (Group D). The four teams from the Dominican Republic and Haiti were placed in Pot 1 and drawn to position 1 of the four groups. The 11 teams originally set to participate in the 2021 CONCACAF Caribbean Club Shield were placed in Pot 2 and drawn to positions 2, 3 and 4 of the four groups. This ensured that teams from the same association could not be drawn into the same group.

Pot 1	Pot 2
(Dominican Republic) Universidad O&M; (Dominican Republic) Delfines del Este; (Haiti) Cavaly; (Haiti) Don Bosco	Racing Club Aruba; (Bonaire) Real Rincon; (Curaçao) Scherpenheuvel; (Dominica) South East; (French Guiana) Olympique de Cayenne; (Guadeloupe) Gosier; (Martinique) Samaritaine; (Puerto Rico) Metropolitan; (Saint Lucia) Platinum FC; (Sint Maarten) Flames United; (Suriname) Inter Moengotapoe

After the draw was made, Hope International (Saint Vincent and the Grenadines) were added to Group D, and each group would have four teams. Later, Racing Club Aruba (Aruba) and Platinum FC (Saint Lucia) withdrew, and there were only two teams left in Group B. To ensure that each group had a minimum of three teams, a draw was held on 13 May 2021 to relocate a team from Group A to Group B, and Metropolitan (Puerto Rico) were moved. South East (Dominica) also withdrew, so eventually there were three teams in Groups A–C, and four teams in Group D.

The winners of each group advanced to the semi-finals.

Tiebreakers

The ranking of teams in each group is determined as follows (Regulations Article 12.1):

1. Points obtained in all group matches (three points for a win, one for a draw, zero for a loss);
2. Goal difference in all group matches;
3. Number of goals scored in all group matches;
4. Points obtained in the matches played between the teams in question;
5. Goal difference in the matches played between the teams in question;
6. Number of goals scored in the matches played between the teams in question;
7. Fair play points in all group matches (only one deduction could be applied to a player in a single match):
  - Yellow card: −1 points;
  - Indirect red card (second yellow card): −3 points;
  - Direct red card: −4 points;
  - Yellow card and direct red card: −5 points;
8. Drawing of lots.

All times local, AST (UTC−4).

=== Group A ===
Pos	Team	Pld	W	D	L	GF	GA	GD	Pts	Qualification
1	(Suriname) Inter Moengotapoe	2	1	1	0	13	1	+12	4	Knockout stage
2	(Dominican Republic) Universidad O&M (H)	2	1	1	0	12	2	+10	4	
3	(Sint Maarten) Flames United	2	0	0	2	1	23	−22	0	

Source: CONCACAF
(H) Hosts
15 May 2021
17:00

Universidad O&M (Dominican Republic)	11–1	(Sint Maarten) Flames United
Sanon 3', 6'; Mena 28', 58'; Hernández 35'; Jamesley 41', 50', 79'; Weekes 45+1' (o.g.); Tineo 75'; Modesta 90'	Report	Gordon 15'

Estadio Olímpico Félix Sánchez, Santo Domingo
Referee: Tori Penso (United States)

17 May 2021
20:00

Flames United (Sint Maarten)	0–12	(Suriname) Inter Moengotapoe
	Report	Doorson 9', 70'; Kastiel 21', 31'; Darson 35' (pen.), 48'; S. Eduard 37'; Brunswijk 64'; Amoeferie 83' (pen.); Wong 86' (o.g.); C. Eduard 89'; Wijks 90+2'

Estadio Panamericano, San Cristóbal
Referee: Edgar Ramírez (El Salvador)

19 May 2021
20:00

Universidad O&M (Dominican Republic)	1–1	(Suriname) Inter Moengotapoe
Mena 11'	Report	Fer 57'

Estadio Olímpico Félix Sánchez, Santo Domingo
Referee: Tori Penso (United States)

=== Group B ===
Pos	Team	Pld	W	D	L	GF	GA	GD	Pts	Qualification
1	(Puerto Rico) Metropolitan	2	2	0	0	7	0	+7	6	Knockout stage
2	(Dominican Republic) Delfines del Este (H)	2	1	0	1	10	3	+7	3	
3	(Bonaire) Real Rincon	2	0	0	2	0	14	−14	0	

Source: CONCACAF
(H) Hosts
15 May 2021
20:00

Delfines del Este (Dominican Republic)	0–3 Awarded (Note: The original score of the match between Delfines del Este and Metropolitan was a 1–1 draw. However, CONCACAF awarded Metropolitan a 3–0 victory after Delfines del Este were determined to have fielded six ineligible players in the match.)	(Puerto Rico) Metropolitan
Mena 90+5'	Report	Rivera 83'

Estadio Olímpico Félix Sánchez, Santo Domingo
Referee: Ricangel de Leça (Aruba)

17 May 2021
17:00

Metropolitan (Puerto Rico)	4–0	(Bonaire) Real Rincon
Ramos 6'; Ri. Janga 39' (o.g.); Rivera 75', 90+4'	Report

Estadio Panamericano, San Cristóbal
Referee: Odette Hamilton (Jamaica)

19 May 2021
17:00

Delfines del Este (Dominican Republic)	10–0	(Bonaire) Real Rincon
Victoria 3', 17', 19', 20', 48'; Mena 16'; Heredia 37' (pen.), 84'; Valdez 38'; Michel 54'	Report

Estadio Olímpico Félix Sánchez, Santo Domingo
Referee: Jamar Springer (Barbados)

=== Group C ===
Pos	Team	Pld	W	D	L	GF	GA	GD	Pts	Qualification
1	(Martinique) Samaritaine	2	1	1	0	5	3	+2	4	Knockout stage
2	(Haiti) Don Bosco	2	1	1	0	3	2	+1	4	
3	(Guadeloupe) Gosier	2	0	0	2	1	4	−3	0	
4	(Dominica) ~~South East~~	0	0	0	0	0	0	0	0	Withdrew (Note: South East withdrew after being unable to travel to the Dominican Republic in time for the tournament due to travel challenges resulting from the COVID-19 pandemic.)

Source: CONCACAF
Notes:
16 May 2021
17:00

Don Bosco (Haiti)	2–2	(Martinique) Samaritaine
Dejan 14'; Innocent 79'	Report	Percin 27'; Florent 70'

Estadio Olímpico Félix Sánchez, Santo Domingo
Referee: Rubiel Vázquez (United States)

18 May 2021
17:00

Samaritaine (Martinique)	3–1	(Guadeloupe) Gosier
Percin 26'; Lise 44'; Florent 90+5'	Report	Orilus 19'

Estadio Panamericano, San Cristóbal
Referee: Oliver Vergara (Panama)

20 May 2021
20:00

Don Bosco (Haiti)	1–0	(Guadeloupe) Gosier
Zavarov 55'	Report

Estadio Olímpico Félix Sánchez, Santo Domingo
Referee: Trevester Richards (Saint Kitts and Nevis)

=== Group D ===
Pos	Team	Pld	W	D	L	GF	GA	GD	Pts	Qualification
1	(Haiti) Cavaly	3	3	0	0	10	1	+9	9	Knockout stage
2	(Curaçao) Scherpenheuvel	3	2	0	1	6	5	+1	6	
3	(Saint Vincent and the Grenadines) Hope International	3	1	0	2	6	6	0	3	
4	(French Guiana) Olympique de Cayenne	3	0	0	3	2	12	−10	0	

Source: CONCACAF
16 May 2021
17:00

Olympique de Cayenne (French Guiana)	1–4	(Saint Vincent and the Grenadines) Hope International
Batiste 45+3'	Report	Samuel 13'; Millington 45+1'; McBurnette 72'; Douglas 90+3' (pen.)

Estadio Panamericano, San Cristóbal
Referee: William Anderson (Puerto Rico)
16 May 2021
20:00

Cavaly (Haiti)	3–0	(Curaçao) Scherpenheuvel
Joseph 3' (pen.); Dorvil 12'; Fenelson 86'	Report

Estadio Olímpico Félix Sánchez, Santo Domingo
Referee: Francia González (Mexico)

18 May 2021
20:00

Cavaly (Haiti)	5–0	(French Guiana) Olympique de Cayenne
Eddyson 26'; Dorvil 40', 62'; Jean 53'; Fenelson 87'	Report

Estadio Olímpico Félix Sánchez, Santo Domingo
Referee: Randy Encarnación (Dominican Republic)
18 May 2021
20:00

Scherpenheuvel (Curaçao)	3–1	(Saint Vincent and the Grenadines) Hope International
Rocha 34'; Ciarnello 61'; Gil 86'	Report	Douglas 70'

Estadio Panamericano, San Cristóbal
Referee: Trevester Richards (Saint Kitts and Nevis)

20 May 2021
17:00

Cavaly (Haiti)	2–1	(Saint Vincent and the Grenadines) Hope International
Joseph 31', 79'	Report	McBurnette 34'

Estadio Olímpico Félix Sánchez, Santo Domingo
Referee: Oliver Vergara (Panama)
20 May 2021
17:00

Scherpenheuvel (Curaçao)	3–1	(French Guiana) Olympique de Cayenne
Ciarnello 10'; Rocha 16', 27'	Report	Batiste 5'

Estadio Panamericano, San Cristóbal
Referee: Odette Hamilton (Jamaica)

== Knockout stage ==
=== Bracket ===
The semi-final matchups would be:

- SF1: Group A Winners vs. Group B Winners
- SF2: Group C Winners vs. Group D Winners

The winners of SF1 and SF2 would play in the final.

Semi-finals
23 May – Santo Domingo
(Suriname) Inter Moengotapoe	3
(Puerto Rico) Metropolitan	1
23 May – Santo Domingo
(Martinique) Samaritaine	0
(Haiti) Cavaly	2

Final
25 May – Santo Domingo
(Suriname) Inter Moengotapoe	0
(Haiti) Cavaly	3

=== Semi-finals ===
23 May 2021
17:00

Inter Moengotapoe (Suriname)	3–1	(Puerto Rico) Metropolitan
Kastiel 53'; Darson 69'; Doorson 86'	Report	Nieves 90+5'

Estadio Olímpico Félix Sánchez, Santo Domingo
Referee: Rubiel Vázquez (United States)

23 May 2021
20:00

Samaritaine (Martinique)	0–2	(Haiti) Cavaly
	Report	Jean 30'; Vitulin 77' (o.g.)

Estadio Olímpico Félix Sánchez, Santo Domingo
Referee: Oliver Vergara (Panama)

=== Final ===
25 May 2021
20:00

Inter Moengotapoe (Suriname)	0–3	(Haiti) Cavaly
	Report	Monuma 29'; Dorvil 47', 77'

Estadio Olímpico Félix Sánchez, Santo Domingo
Referee: Francia González (Mexico)

== Top goalscorers ==
Team eliminated or inactive for this round.

Rank	Player	Team	Goals	By round				
Rank	Player	Team	Goals	G1	G2	G3	SF	F
1	(Haiti) Gamaël Dorvil	(Haiti) Cavaly	5	1	2			2
1	(Dominican Republic) Roberto Victoria	(Dominican Republic) Delfines del Este	5			5		
3	(Suriname) Miquel Darson	(Suriname) Inter Moengotapoe	3		2		1	
3	(Suriname) Rievaldo Doorson	(Suriname) Inter Moengotapoe	3		2		1	
3	(Haiti) Daniel Jamesley	(Dominican Republic) Universidad O&M	3	3				
3	(Haiti) Roody Joseph	(Haiti) Cavaly	3	1		2		
3	(Suriname) Romeo Kastiel	(Suriname) Inter Moengotapoe	3		2		1	
3	(Colombia) Hilario Mena	(Dominican Republic) Universidad O&M	3	2		1		
3	(Puerto Rico) Jorge Rivera	(Puerto Rico) Metropolitan	3	1	2			
3	(Uruguay) Nicolás Rocha	(Curaçao) Scherpenheuvel	3		1	2		

== Awards ==
The following awards were given at the conclusion of the tournament:

Award	Player	Team
Golden Ball	(Haiti) Gamaël Dorvil	(Haiti) Cavaly
Golden Boot	(Haiti) Gamaël Dorvil	(Haiti) Cavaly
Golden Glove	(Haiti) Emmanuel Saint-Félix	(Haiti) Cavaly
Young Player Award	(Haiti) Gamaël Dorvil	(Haiti) Cavaly
Fair Play Award	—	(Suriname) Inter Moengotapoe

== Qualification to CONCACAF Champions League and CONCACAF League ==
Qualified teams from 2021 Caribbean club competitions
- CONCACAF Champions League: (Haiti) Cavaly
- CONCACAF League: (Suriname) Inter Moengotapoe (Puerto Rico) Metropolitan (Martinique) Samaritaine

The top four teams of the 2021 CONCACAF Caribbean Club Championship qualify for the 2022 CONCACAF Champions League or 2021 CONCACAF League as long as they comply with the minimum CONCACAF Club Licensing requirements for the CONCACAF Champions League or CONCACAF League.

- Champions qualify for 2022 CONCACAF Champions League.
- Runners-up qualify for 2021 CONCACAF League round of 16.
- Losing semi-finalists qualify for 2021 CONCACAF League preliminary round. The team with the better record are ranked 3rd overall, and the team with the worse record are ranked 4th overall, for seeding in the CONCACAF League preliminary round draw.

Pos	Team	Pld	W	D	L	GF	GA	GD	Pts	Qualification
1	(Haiti) Cavaly	5	5	0	0	15	1	+14	15	2022 CONCACAF Champions League
2	(Suriname) Inter Moengotapoe	4	2	1	1	16	5	+11	7	2021 CONCACAF League round of 16
3	(Puerto Rico) Metropolitan	3	2	0	1	8	3	+5	6	2021 CONCACAF League preliminary round
4	(Martinique) Samaritaine	3	1	1	1	5	5	0	4	2021 CONCACAF League preliminary round

Source: CONCACAF

== See also ==
- 2021 Caribbean Club Shield
- 2021 CONCACAF League
- 2022 CONCACAF Champions League
