= 2009 CFU Club Championship =

CFU Club Championship 2009
Caribbean Champions Cup

Tournament details
- Host country: Trinidad and Tobago
- City: Macoya
- Dates: 18 March – 17 May
- Teams: 12 (from 9 associations)

Final positions
- Champions: (Trinidad and Tobago) W Connection (2nd title)
- Runners-up: Puerto Rico Islanders
- Third place: (Trinidad and Tobago) San Juan Jabloteh
- Fourth place: (Haiti) Tempête

Tournament statistics
- Matches played: 20
- Goals scored: 72 (3.6 per match)
- Top scorer: (Dominican Republic) Jonathan Faña Frias (6 goals)

The 2009 CFU Club Championship was the 11th edition of the CFU Club Championship, the annual international club football competition in the Caribbean region, held amongst clubs whose football associations are affiliated with the Caribbean Football Union (CFU). The top three teams in the tournament – W Connection, Puerto Rico Islanders, and San Juan Jabloteh – qualified for the 2009–10 CONCACAF Champions League.

== Teams ==
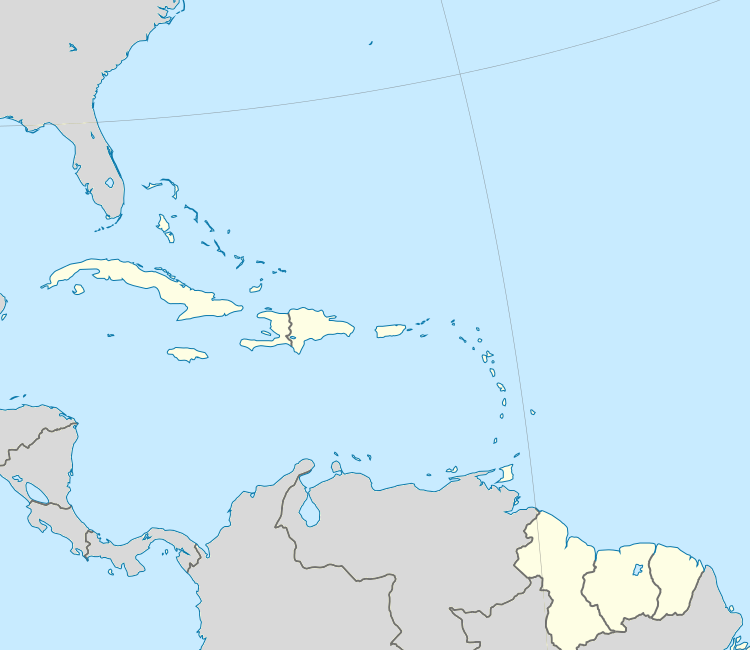
Location of teams of the 2009 CFU Club Championship

Association	Team	Qualification method	App. (last)	Previous best (last)
Netherlands Antilles	Barber	2007–08 Netherlands Antilles Championship winners	5th (2007)	Semi-finals (2005)
Aruba	Racing Club Aruba	2007–08 Aruban Division di Honor champions	2nd (2007)	First round (2007)
Aruba	Britannia	2007–08 Aruban Division di Honor runners-up	3rd (2006)	First round (2006)
Antigua and Barbuda	Hoppers	Invited	3rd (2006)	Quarter-finals (2005)
Dominica	Bath Estate	2008 Dominica Premier League champions	1st	Debut
Guyana	Alpha United	Invited	1st	Debut
Haiti	Cavaly	2007 Championnat National Fermeture champions	1st	Debut
Haiti	Tempête	2008 Championnat National Ouverture champions	1st	Debut
Jamaica	Portmore United	2007–08 National Premier League runners-up	4th (2007)	Champions (2005)
Puerto Rico	Puerto Rico Islanders	Invited	3rd (2007)	Third place (2007)
Puerto Rico	Sevilla Puerto Rico	2008 Puerto Rico Soccer League champions	1st	Debut
Suriname	Inter Moengotapoe	2007–08 SVB Eerste Divisie champions	3rd (2007)	First round (2007)
Trinidad and Tobago	San Juan Jabloteh	2008 TT Pro League champions	6th (2007)	Champions (2003)
Trinidad and Tobago	W Connection	2008 TT Pro League runners-up	6th (2006)	Champions (2006)

Notes

- San Juan Jabloteh were seeded and entered in Round 2.
- Puerto Rico Islanders were seeded and entered in Round 3.
- Two clubs withdrew from the tournament the day before the draw: Portmore United and Racing Club Aruba.

== Competition format ==
There was no tournament in 2008 because, prior to this edition, the CFU Club Championship had been held near the end of the calendar year, but in 2008 it was decided that it would be held near the beginning of the following calendar year in order to have the competition take place closer to the next CONCACAF Champions League, which uses this tournament as the Caribbean zone qualifying tournament. As a result, this, the next tournament, was held in early 2009.

The draw for the first round was held at the CONCACAF office in New York City on January 15. The first round matches were originally scheduled to be held over two legs on March 18 and 25. The draw for round two was completed immediately following the first round draw. The second round will also be two-legged and will be held in mid-April. The semi-finals, final and third-place match will be single-elimination matches hosted in Trinidad and Tobago. The semi-finals will be played on May 15, and the final and third-place match will be played two days later at the same venue.

== Draw ==
The first round was played among clubs from two pots. Each club was drawn against another club from the opposing pot.

Pot 1	Pot 2
(Trinidad and Tobago) W Connection (Haiti) Tempête (Haiti) Cavaly (Suriname) Inter Moengotapoe (Antigua and Barbuda) Hoppers	(Aruba) Britannia; Sevilla Puerto Rico (Netherlands Antilles) Barber (Guyana) Alpha United (Dominica) Bath Estate

== Bracket ==
First round
(Netherlands Antilles) Barber	1	1	2
(Suriname) Inter Moengotapoe	3	0	3
(Dominica) Bath Estate	0	1	1
(Trinidad and Tobago) W Connection	5	12	17
(Haiti) Cavaly	5	1	6
(Aruba) Britannia	0	0	0
Sevilla Puerto Rico	3	0	3
(Antigua and Barbuda) Hoppers	3	2	5
(Guyana) Alpha United	1	0	1
(Haiti) Tempête	1	2	3

Second round
(Trinidad and Tobago) San Juan Jabloteh	2	3	5
(Suriname) Inter Moengotapoe	1	1	2
(Trinidad and Tobago) W Connection	3	1	4
(Haiti) Cavaly	1	0	1
(Antigua and Barbuda) Hoppers	0	0	0
(Haiti) Tempête	4	4	8

Semi-finals
(Trinidad and Tobago) San Juan Jabloteh	1
(Trinidad and Tobago) W Connection	2
(Haiti) Tempête	0
Puerto Rico Islanders (a.e.t.)	2

Final
(Trinidad and Tobago) W Connection	2
Puerto Rico Islanders	1
Third place
(Trinidad and Tobago) San Juan Jabloteh	2
(Haiti) Tempête	1

== 1st round ==
The first round was contested in five two-legged matchups. Team #1 in each matchup hosted the first leg. The schedule for the first round legs was updated on March 11 due to necessary travel accommodations for clubs and local events occurring in Aruba and Haiti that would conflict with the original match schedule.

Team 1	Agg.	Team 2	1st leg	2nd leg
Bath Estate (Dominica)	1 – 17	(Trinidad and Tobago) W Connection	0 – 5	1 – 12
Barber (Netherlands Antilles)	2 – 3	(Suriname) Inter Moengotapoe	1 – 3	1 – 0
Sevilla Puerto Rico	3 – 5	(Antigua and Barbuda) Hoppers	3 – 3	0 – 2
Alpha United (Guyana)	1 – 3	(Haiti) Tempête	1 – 1	0 – 2
Cavaly (Haiti)	6 – 0	(Aruba) Britannia	5 – 0	1 – 0

=== First leg ===
March 18, 2009
20:00 UTC-4

Bath Estate (Dominica)	0 – 5	(Trinidad and Tobago) W Connection
		Hector 8', 30', 61'; Frias 51'; Smith 90'

Windsor Park, Roseau

March 18, 2009
19:00 UTC-4

Barber (Netherlands Antilles)	1 – 3	(Suriname) Inter Moengotapoe
Cassiani 34'		Amoeferie 37'; Vlijter 57', 75'

Bandabou, Curaçao

March 21, 2009
19:30 UTC-4

Alpha United (Guyana)	1 – 1	(Haiti) Tempête
Peters 35'		McKenzie 71' (o.g.)

Providence Stadium, Georgetown

March 21, 2009
20:00 UTC-4

Sevilla Puerto Rico	3 – 3	(Antigua and Barbuda) Hoppers
Maya 16' (pen.); Figueroa 42'; Pérez 69'		Frederick 56' 74'; Dublin 90'

Juan Ramón Loubriel Stadium, Bayamón
Attendance: 550

March 22, 2009
17:00 UTC-5

Cavaly (Haiti)	5 – 0	(Aruba) Britannia
Alliance 18'; Amy 28' 45'; Milien 71' 79'

Stade Sylvio Cator, Port-au-Prince

=== Second leg ===
March 25, 2009
19:00 UTC-4

W Connection (Trinidad and Tobago)	12 – 1	(Dominica) Bath Estate
Frias 5' 7'; Toussaint 16' 39' 56'; Williams 36'; Viveros 44'; Aras 52'; Bartholomew 65' 81' 88'; Smith 82'		Benjamin 26'

Manny Ramjohn Stadium, Marabella
Referee: Stanley Lancaster (Guyana)

W Connection won 17–1 on aggregate.

March 25, 2009
20:00 UTC-4

Inter Moengotapoe (Suriname)	0 – 1	(Netherlands Antilles) Barber
		Lake 14'

André Kamperveen Stadion, Paramaribo (Note: Inter Moengotapoe could not host any matches at their home stadium in Moengo, Ronnie Brunswijkstadion, due to a ban on hosting any matches imposed by the Surinamese FA after riots occurred during a home league match.)

Inter Moengotapoe won 3–2 on aggregate.

March 29, 2009
16:30 UTC-4

Hoppers (Antigua and Barbuda)	2 – 0	Sevilla Puerto Rico
Thomas 15'; Frederick 63'

Antigua Recreation Ground, St. John's

Hoppers won 5–3 on aggregate.

March 29, 2009
19:00 UTC-4

Britannia (Aruba)	0 – 1	(Haiti) Cavaly
		Valdo 45+'

Franklin J. Th. Bareño Stadium, Piedra Plat

Cavaly won 6–0 on aggregate.

April 5, 2009
15:00 UTC-5

Tempête (Haiti)	2 – 0	(Guyana) Alpha United
Cadet 12'; Sirin 71'

Parc Levelt, Saint-Marc

Tempête won 3–1 on aggregate.

== 2nd round ==
San Juan Jabloteh were seeded and received a bye to the 2nd round. San Juan Jabloteh and W Connection both hosted their first leg matchups on the same day and decided to host their matches as a billed doubleheader at Manny Ramjohn Stadium in Marabella. In Jabloteh's return leg to Suriname they were without head coach Terry Fenwick, who did not travel with the team because he had not been paid by the club since the end of the 2008 TT Pro League season.

Team 1	Agg.	Team 2	1st leg	2nd leg
San Juan Jabloteh (Trinidad and Tobago)	5 – 2	(Suriname) Inter Moengotapoe	2 – 1	3 – 1
W Connection (Trinidad and Tobago)	4 – 1	(Haiti) Cavaly	3 – 1	1 – 0
Hoppers (Antigua and Barbuda)	0 – 8	(Haiti) Tempête	0 – 4	0 – 4

=== First leg ===
April 13, 2009
18:30 UTC-4

San Juan Jabloteh (Trinidad and Tobago)	2 – 1	(Suriname) Inter Moengotapoe
Forbes 16'; Oliver 86'		Pinas 72'

Manny Ramjohn Stadium, Marabella

April 13, 2009
20:30 UTC-4

W Connection (Trinidad and Tobago)	3 – 1	(Haiti) Cavaly
Viveros 3'; Toussaint 49'; Hector 55'		Millien 90+3'

Manny Ramjohn Stadium, Marabella

April 20, 2009
18:30 UTC-4

Hoppers (Antigua and Barbuda)	0 – 4	(Haiti) Tempête
		Herold 28'; Thompson 35'; Eliphene 43' 71'

Antigua Recreation Ground, St. John's

=== Second leg ===
April 20, 2009
20:00 UTC-4

Inter Moengotapoe (Suriname)	1 – 3	(Trinidad and Tobago) San Juan Jabloteh
Bron 3'		Glen 13'; Jamerson 47'; Primus 66'

André Kamperveen Stadion, Paramaribo
Attendance: ~3,000

San Juan Jabloteh won 5–2 on aggregate.

April 24, 2009
16:00 UTC-5

Cavaly (Haiti)	0 – 1	(Trinidad and Tobago) W Connection
		Oliveira 30'

Stade Sylvio Cator, Port-au-Prince

W Connection won 4–1 on aggregate.

May 1, 2009
16:00 UTC-5

Tempête (Haiti)	4 – 0	(Antigua and Barbuda) Hoppers
Fils 26' 31' 56'; Thompson 72'

Parc Levelt, Saint-Marc

Tempête won 8–0 on aggregate.

== Final round ==
All of the matches in the final round will be played at Marvin Lee Stadium in Macoya, Trinidad and Tobago. The final round matchups are single elimination; the losers will play one another in a third place matchup to determine the third and final CFU entrant into the CONCACAF Champions League 2009–10. The Puerto Rico Islanders were seeded and received a bye directly into the final round.

=== Semifinal round ===
May 15, 2009
17:00 UTC-4

Puerto Rico Islanders	2 – 0 (a.e.t.)	(Haiti) Tempête
Jagdeosingh 102'; Villegas 114'

Marvin Lee Stadium, Macoya

May 15, 2009
19:30 UTC-4

San Juan Jabloteh (Trinidad and Tobago)	1 – 2	(Trinidad and Tobago) W Connection
John 65'		Frias 35'; Hector 37'

Marvin Lee Stadium, Macoya

=== Third place ===
May 17, 2009
16:00 UTC-4

Tempête (Haiti)	1 – 2	(Trinidad and Tobago) San Juan Jabloteh
Murray 55' (o.g.)		Glen 33'; E. John 44'

Marvin Lee Stadium, Macoya

=== Final ===
May 17, 2009
18:30 UTC-4

W Connection (Trinidad and Tobago)	2 – 1	Puerto Rico Islanders
Frias 7' 21'		Nuñez 36'

Marvin Lee Stadium, Macoya

CFU Club Championship
2009 Winners

W Connection
Third Title

== Goalscorers ==
Goals	Player	Team
6	(Dominican Republic) Jonathan Faña Frias	(Trinidad and Tobago) W Connection
5	(Trinidad and Tobago) Hughton Hector	(Trinidad and Tobago) W Connection
4	(Trinidad and Tobago) Andre Toussaint	(Trinidad and Tobago) W Connection
3	(Trinidad and Tobago) Matthew Bartholomew	(Trinidad and Tobago) W Connection
3	(Haiti) Belfort Fils	(Haiti) Tempête
3	(Antigua and Barbuda) Kelly Frederick	(Antigua and Barbuda) Hoppers
3	(Haiti) Alex Milien	(Haiti) Cavaly
2	(Haiti) André Amy	(Haiti) Cavaly
2	(Haiti) Éliphène Cadet	(Haiti) Tempête
2	(Trinidad and Tobago) Cyrano Glen	(Trinidad and Tobago) San Juan Jabloteh
2	(Trinidad and Tobago) Elton John	(Trinidad and Tobago) San Juan Jabloteh
2	(Trinidad and Tobago) Kerron Smith	(Trinidad and Tobago) W Connection
2	(Haiti) Amius Thompson	(Haiti) Tempête
2	(Colombia) Christian Viveros	(Trinidad and Tobago) W Connection
2	(Suriname) Ives Vlijter	(Suriname) Inter Moengotapoe
1	27 players	
Own goals	2 players	
