= Joe Gaetjens =

Haitian soccer player

Personal information
- Full name: Joseph Edouard Gaetjens
- Date of birth: March 19, 1924
- Place of birth: Port-au-Prince, Haiti
- Date of death: c. July 10, 1964 (aged 40)
- Place of death: Port-au-Prince, Haiti
- Height: 5 ft 10 in (1.78 m)
- Position: Center forward

Senior career*
Years	Team	Apps	(Gls)
1938–1947	Etoile Haïtienne		
1947–1950	Brookhattan	64	(42)
1951–1952	Racing Club de Paris	4	(2)
1952–1953	Olympique Alès	15	(2)
1953–1957	Etoile Haïtienne		

International career
1944–1953	Haiti	3	(0)
1950	United States	3	(1)
- * Club domestic league appearances and goals

Joseph Edouard Gaetjens (/ˈɡeɪdʒɛnz/ GAY-jenz; March 19, 1924 – c. July 10, 1964) was a professional soccer player who played as a center forward. Born in Haiti, he represented its national team before and after playing for the United States team in the 1950 FIFA World Cup, in which he scored the winning goal in the 1–0 upset of England.

Gaetjens won his home national championship in 1942 and 1944 with top-level Etoile Haïtienne. He then moved to the American Soccer League (ASL) and led all players with 18 goals in 15 games for New York's Brookhattan during the 1949–50 season. He was posthumously inducted into the United States National Soccer Hall of Fame in 1976.

Gaetjens is among the Les 100 Héros de la Coupe du Monde ("100 Heroes of the World Cup"), which included the top 100 World Cup Players from 1930 to 1990, a list drawn up in 1994 by the France Football magazine based exclusively on their performances at World Cup level.

== Early life ==
Joe Gaetjens was born in Haiti's capital of Port-au-Prince on March 19, 1924, to Edmond and Antonine Defay, a well-to-do Haitian family who lived in an upscale neighborhood of Port-au-Prince called Bois Verna. His great-grandfather Thomas, was a native of Bremen, in northern Germany, who supposedly had been sent to Haiti by Frederick William III, the King of Prussia, as a business emissary arriving shortly after 1825; although the validity for this claim is uncertain by family members. He married Leonie Déjoie, whose father was a general in a time when Haiti's independence was officially recognized by France. The family was quite prosperous, and although by the time of Joe's birth their wealth had decreased significantly after the United States occupation of Haiti (1915–34), in which the economic isolation of Germany due to World War I and conflicts over family assets between sons took its toll on the family's business interests, they were still living among the Haitian elite. When Gaetjens was born, his father registered his birth certificate with the German embassy, in case he ever wanted to gain German citizenship.

== Club career ==
=== Etoile Haïtienne ===
Gaetjens joined Etoile Haïtienne at the age of fourteen and won two Ligue Haïtienne championships in 1942 and 1944. In his first championship appearance, at the age of eighteen, came against longer established Racing Club Haïtien, another club in Port-au-Prince. (Note: According to the Rec Sport Soccer Statistics Foundation, rsssf.com, cup matches were played throughout the country, but the national championships were restricted to top-level clubs from Port-au-Prince only, and a few surrounding areas within. It wasn't until 1988, that the national championship was fully integrated in to league format outside of the capital.) Down 3–0 at halftime and a heckling goalkeeper directed at Gaetjens after each goal scored, "Ti-Joe" urged his teammates to hold its defense to allow no more goals. Less than ten minutes after Racing's last goal, Gaetjens rebounded and scored to break the shutout. At the 53rd minute, Fritz Joseph scored. With seven minutes remaining, Frérot Rouzier scored the tying goal equalizing the match at 3–3. At the final minutes of regulation, a defiant Gaetjens kept on the offense, breaking the tie at 3–4, which ended up being the game-winner. To this day, Racing Club Haïtien refuses to play matches on the "Jeudi Saint" (Holy Thursday); the day of washing of the feet. During his tenure with the club, he became known for his goal-scoring headers.

=== Brookhattan ===
Gaetjens went to New York City in 1947 to study accounting at Columbia University on a scholarship from the Haitian government and concluded that he could not make a living from professional soccer in Haiti. During this time, he played three seasons for Brookhattan of the American Soccer League (ASL). In his first season during 1947–48, he scored the second-most goals in the league with 14. In his third season, he won the league's scoring title totaling 18 goals in 15 games during 1949–50. He was making $25 per game, while also working for the Brookhattan owner's restaurant and washing dishes.

=== Racing Club de Paris and Olympique Alès ===
At the end of the World Cup, Gaetjens left for France to play in Division 1, where he briefly played for Racing Club de Paris; scoring twice in four games and then for Division 2 Olympique Alès; scoring twice in fifteen games.

=== Etoile Haïtienne ===
Gaetjens returned to Haiti in 1954 and remained active in soccer, rejoining Etoile Haïtienne, and also became a spokesman for Colgate-Palmolive. He played a few seasons and then left the game for good in 1957, a few months after the birth of his first son.

== International career ==
=== Haiti ===
Gaetjens debuted on the international scene on April 2, 1944, for the Haiti national team, losing to Curaçao, 0–5. In the following match on April 5, 1944, against Venezuela, the Haitian team was shut out 0–2. Both matches were friendlies.

=== United States ===
Gaetjens' success with Brookhattan attracted the attention of U.S. Soccer, and Gaetjens made the national team for the 1950 World Cup.

Gaetjens played three games at the World Cup, including one of the greatest World Cup upsets in history, in which Gaetjens scored the only goal in a 1–0 victory in which the American soccer team defeated the hugely favored English at Belo Horizonte. Walter Bahr had taken a shot from about 25 yards away and the ball was heading to goalkeeper Bert Williams's right. It appeared to be a relatively easy save, but Gaetjens dived headlong and grazed the ball enough that it went to the goalkeeper's left instead, with his momentum preventing him from stopping the ball. Williams later considered the goal to be a result of a lucky deflection, but this view was disputed by Laurie Hughes, who was defending Gaetjens on the play.

Although Gaetjens was not a United States citizen, he had declared his intention of becoming one, and under the rules of the United States Soccer Football Association at that time was allowed to play. However, Gaetjens never actually did gain American citizenship.

=== Return to Haiti ===
On December 27, 1953, Gaetjens played in a World Cup Qualifier for Haiti against Mexico.

== Death and legacy ==
Gaetjens was not interested in politics, but his family was. He was related to Louis Déjoie (his great-grandfather Thomas married Leonie Déjoie), who lost the 1957 Haitian presidential election to François "Papa Doc" Duvalier, and although the family also had connections to the new president, Gaetjens's younger brothers Jean-Pierre and Fred became associated with a group of exiles in the Dominican Republic who wanted to stage a coup.

On July 8, 1964, the morning after Duvalier declared himself "president for life", the rest of the Gaetjens family fled the country in fear of reprisal for the younger Gaetjens brothers' rebellious associations, but Joe stayed, thinking that Duvalier's regime would be uninterested in him since he was only a sports figure. That morning, he was arrested by the secret police—the Tonton Macoutes—and was taken to a prison called Fort Dimanche notorious for its brutally inhumane practices, where it is presumed he was killed some time later that month. His body has never been found.

In 1972, Gaetjens was honored in a benefit game involving the New York Cosmos and a team composed of local Haitians at Yankee Stadium. Joe Gaetjens was posthumously inducted into the United States National Soccer Hall of Fame in 1976.

In 2010, his son Lesly Gaetjens wrote a biography about his father: The Shot Heard Around the World: The Joe Gaetjens Story.

=== Number search ===
The jersey number worn by Gaetjens during the 1950 World Cup match against England remains unknown, with several accounts from family members and historians unable to verify various claims. The number was not recorded in an official match report; the National Soccer Hall of Fame stated the number was 18 and cited Walter Bahr, but he was unable to verify the claim. An unnamed ESPN producer for "Outside the Lines" who worked with footage of the match for a special dedicated to Gaetjens stated to an ESPN journalist that they were "98 or 99 percent sure" that the number was 18.

=== Film controversy ===
Gaetjens, although light-skinned, was portrayed by "dark-skinned" Haitian actor Jimmy Jean-Louis in the 2005 film The Game of Their Lives. He was also depicted as a practitioner of Voodoo, which outraged his family, leading them to proclaim how ludicrously inaccurate the interpretation was. In reality, Gaetjens, like most Haitians, grew up as a Catholic and went to church every Sunday. His sister, Mireille, voiced her displeasure and condemned the notion over a phone interview by saying: "Our family traded rum and coffee and ran schools... No family member was into voodoo. I've never even seen voodoo being practiced. Nobody in the family has ever even set foot in a voodoo church!"

== Personal life ==
When Gaetjens first arrived in the US from Haiti, he was mistaken for Belgian of the Flemish-speaking part of the country, due to the sounding of his surname ending in -tjens and the fact that migration in waves from Belgium were common during the 19th century. However, his great-grandfather was from Bremen of northern Germany and the Gaetjens name is not common in Flanders. A variant does exist over Germany's northern border in Denmark as Gätjens.

Gaetjens was a fluent speaker of French, Spanish and English.

== Honors ==
=== Club ===
==== Etoile Haïtienne ====
- Ligue Haïtienne: 1942, 1944

==== Brookhattan ====
- Runner-up National Challenge Cup: 1948

=== Individual ===
- Inducted into the United States National Soccer Hall of Fame: 1976
- France Football: World Cup Top-100 1930–1990
- NSCAA Honorary All-America Award: 2015

==== Performances ====
- ASL Golden Boot: 1950

== Career statistics ==
Club	Season (Note: According to the American Soccer History Archives, the champion was determined by top-record. If tied, a playoff would be adopted by the ASL to determine the winner.)	League		U.S. Open Cup		Lewis Cup		Duffy Cup		Friendlies		Total	
Club	Season	Apps	Goals	Apps	Goals	Apps	Goals	Apps	Goals	Apps	Goals	Apps* (Note: Total games played unavailable; individual games revealed usually only when goals were scored. This number reflects the total games played by Brookhattan during these seasons. In the 1950–51 season, games are not incurred for 1951 since Gaetjens wasn't with the club.)	Goals
Brookhattan	1947–48	20	14									20	14
Brookhattan	1948			6	1	3	3					9	4
Brookhattan	1948–49	17	4									17	4
Brookhattan	1949			2	0	3	2	1	1			6	3
Brookhattan	1949–50	15	18									15	18
Brookhattan	1950			6	4	4	2	5	0	1	1	16	7
Brookhattan	1950–51 (Note: According to SoccerStats.us, Gaetjens did not finish the season for Brookhattan and did not play a game in 1951 for the ASL.)	12	6									12	6
Total		64	42	14	5	10	7	6	1	1	1	95	56
