= Victory SC =

Association football club in Haiti

- Full name: Victory Sportif Club
- Founded: 7 March 1945; 81 years ago
- Ground: Stade Sylvio Cator
- Capacity: 15,000
- League: Ligue Haïtienne
- 2013: 10th (last season played) (Note: Sanctioned from play by the FHF in 2014 with the eligibility to return for the 2015 season. The club refused to register with the league and its status is unknown.)
- Website: www.victorysportifclubhaiti.com
Home colours

Victory Sportif Club, commonly known as Victory, is a Haitian professional football club based in Port-au-Prince.

== History ==
=== Early years ===
Victory Sportif Club was founded by Augustin R. Viau on 7 March 1945. They were affiliated in 1947 by the FHF and assigned to the second division where they won the league promoting themselves to the first division for 1948. Their first win came against Melbourne (Bel Air) by the score of 2–0. On 16 January 1948, Victory played their first match in the top-tier division that ended in defeat to Racing by 1–0 (by goal of Antoine Tassy).

=== Golden years (1955–1965) ===
During this decade, Victory gained a leading role in the league, national team and even internationally; a credit to a major change in the style of play of Victory led by the technical direction of Michel Alerte (alias "Sonson"). In 1955, the tenth anniversary of the club, Victory won its first Coupe d'Haïti (Coupe Vincent) by defeating Petit-Goâve (4–0), Racing (3–0) and Pétion-Ville in the final (3–1).

In 1957, Victory played a return match in Curaçao with a 0–0 draw against the Sithoc, after a 1–0 win in Port-au-Prince. In 1958, Victory played a successful tour in Costa Rica, El Salvador to participate in a tournament of the winners of the cup and placed second with a 3–2 win over the C.S.D. Comunicaciones with goals by René Vertus.

During 1958–1962, Victory was one of the strongest clubs in Haitian football and won its first national championship (Coupe Pradel) in 1960. The following year, although reigning champions of the league, a dispute between the FHF and Victory led the club to lose its invitation in a tournament organized for the arrival of Czech club, Red Star Bratislava. The Czech club went on to defeat Racing (3–1), Aigle Noir (4–0), and the Haitian national selection (4–0). In an attempt to save the national honor, Victory was recalled and defeated the Czechs 2–0.

The following season in 1961, Victory continued its surge and won the Coupe d'Haïti (Coupe Vincent) by defeating Petit-Goâve (6–3) Aigle Noir (3–2), Racing (3–1) and Etoile Haïtienne in the final 2–1. The club's physical condition was a very important ingredient to their success; prepared by General Claude Raymond and his brother Dr. Adrien Raymond, who was club president and administered care to the players, Franck Civil who led in technical preparation and Michel Oreste Alerte in tactical development respectively.

=== Steady decline (1966–1976) ===
As the members who contributed to Victory's early success began to gradually disband, seven to eight of club's next ten years ended in average results and a low in 1971, where Victory was invited to play a quadrangular relegation playoff between Don Bosco, Etoile, Bacardi to determine 1st or 2nd division status for the next season. Victory instead decided to withdraw from the 70–71 national championship after weighing the arbitrary principle and were absent from national sports for about a year and a half. During this time, the club chose to restructure itself and club members decided to focus on student athletes. The Collège Canado-Haïtien, where Franck Civil and Frantz Joseph of Victory coached the school's selections, allowed them to recruit the majority of its reserve team consisted of Bernier, Ronald Punn, Gerald Jean, Gérard Janvier Fils, Hérold, and Raphaël Alexis. With the reconstruction of the senior team, Victory returned to the Pradel Cup in 1975 chaired by Mr. Lionel Leconte, finishing second after losing 0–1 in the final against the Aigle Noir.

=== Recent history (2010–) ===
Victory won the série de clôture in the 2010–11 season by defeating the Association de Saint-Louis du Nord (1–0) by a goal scored by Wilfrid Brunache. Robert Duval's integration of athletic youths, rejuvenated the club, led by coach Webens Princimé (Itala) and under the presidency of Mr. Jean Alexandre Lafalaise and Dr. Gérard Janvier, fils. Ricardo Charles received the trophy of best scorer with 14 goals.

The FHF suspended the club following the 2013 season, for refusing to honor fixtures that included clubs who had not qualified based on merit. Allowed reentry in the 2015 season, the club refused to register and its status currently remains unknown.

== Honours ==
- Ligue Haïtienne
  - Champions (2): 1960, 2010–11
- Coupe d'Haïti
  - Champions (2): 1954, 1962

== International competitions ==
- CONCACAF Champions' Cup: 1 appearance

1984 – Final Round (Caribbean) – Final Group – 3rd placed – 1 pt (stage ? of ?)

- CFU Club Championship: 1 appearance

2012 – Second Round – Group 5 – 3rd place – 4 pts (stage 2 of 3) – lost against (Trinidad and Tobago) W Connection – 2–0, draw against (Antigua and Barbuda) Antigua Barracuda 0–0; win against (Suriname) 2–8

== Current squad ==
Note: Flags indicate national team as defined under FIFA eligibility rules; some limited exceptions apply. Players may hold more than one non-FIFA nationality.

No.	Pos.	Nation	Player
1	GK	HAI	Fortune Bekenson
2	DF	HAI	Parnel Guerrier
3	DF	HAI	Fritz Milien
4		HAI	Clervilus Evens
5		HAI	Jn François Kismy
6	DF	HAI	Jean Fritz St Germain
7	MF	HAI	Clifford Merilus
8	FW	HAI	Ricardo Charles
9		HAI	Brunache Wilfrid
10	FW	HAI	Gaspard Jean Baptiste
11		HAI	Simson Zamor
12		HAI	Rodlin Vincent

No.	Pos.	Nation	Player
13	MF	HAI	Georges Michel Chéry
14	FW	HAI	Philippe Toussaint Jr
15		HAI	Chérisier Robert
16		HAI	Pierre Junior
17		HAI	Saint Preux Leonel
18		HAI	Beauvais Henderson Tcha
19		HAI	Louis Jn Loris
20	MF	HAI	Samuel Alté Jacques
21	GK	HAI	Valcine Jn Benson
22		HAI	Guillaume Stephane
23		HAI	Dacius Gilles
