= Excelsior AC (Haiti) =

Football club based in Port-au-Prince, Haiti

- Full name: Excelsior Athlétique Club
- League: Championnat National D3
- 2008: Championnat National D2, 12th (relegated)

Excelsior Athlétique Club is a professional football club based in Port-au-Prince, Haiti. The last time the club played in Division 1 was in 2002. After the 2008 season, the club was relegated to Division 3. In 1950, it captured the double after winning the league and the Coupe d'Haïti.

== Honours ==
- Ligue Haïtienne
  - Champions (3): 1948, 1950, 1951
- Coupe d'Haïti
  - Winners (1): 1942, 1950
