= Etoile Haïtienne =

- Full name: Etoile Haïtienne
- Founded: 1936; 90 years ago
- League: Championnat National D3
- 2003: Championnat National D2 (relegated)

Etoile Haïtienne (French pronunciation: [e.twal ajisjɛ̃n], English: Haitian Star) is a professional football club based in Port-au-Prince, Haiti. After the 2003 season, the club was relegated to Division 3.

The last known time the club played in Division 1 was in 1970.

== History ==
Etoile Haïtienne appeared in its first championship in 1942 against longer established Racing Club Haïtien, another club in Port-au-Prince. (Note: According to the Rec Sport Soccer Statistics Foundation, rsssf.com, cup matches were played throughout the country, but the national championships were restricted to top-level clubs from Port-au-Prince only, and a few surrounding areas within. It wasn't until 1988, that the national championship was fully integrated in to league format outside of the capital.) Down 3–0 at halftime and less than ten minutes after Racing's last goal, Joe Gaetjens rebounded and scored to break the shutout. At the 53rd minute, Fritz Joseph scores. Seven minutes remaining, Frérot Rouzier scores the tying goal equalizing the match at 3–3. At the final minutes of regulation, a defiant Gaetjens kept on the attack, breaking the tie at 3–4, which ended up being the game-winner. To this day, Racing Club Haïtien refuses to play matches on the "Jeudi Saint" (Holy Thursday); the day of washing of the feet.

== Honours ==
- Ligue Haïtienne: 3

1942, 1944, 1961

== International competitions ==
- CONCACAF Champions League: 1 appearance

1962 – First Round – Lost against (Netherlands Antilles) SITHOC, 3–8 on aggregate (3–2, 0–6)
