= Hatüey Bacardi Club =

Bacardi
- Full name: Hatüey Bacardi Club
- Founded: 13 July 1935; 91 years ago
- Chairman: Kervens Jérôme
- Manager: Jemley Louis-Évariste
- League: Championnat National D3
- 2010–11: Championnat National D2, 12th (relegated)

Hatüey Bacardi Club is a professional football club based in Port-au-Prince, Haiti. The last known time the club played in Division 1 was in 1970. After the 2010–11 season, the club was relegated to Division 3.

== History ==
The Hatüey Bacardi Club was founded in Morne à Tuf, Port-au-Prince on 13 July 1935.

== Honours ==
- Ligue Haïtienne: 2

1940, 1945
