= Ricardo Charles =

Haitian footballer (born 1983)

Personal information
- Date of birth: 4 June 1983 (age 43)
- Place of birth: Jérémie, Haiti
- Position: Striker

Team information
- Current team: Victory
- Number: 9

Senior career*
Years	Team	Apps	(Gls)
2005–	Victory SC	?	(?)

International career^{‡}
2010–	Haiti	4	(1)
- * Club domestic league appearances and goals ‡ National team caps and goals as of 8 April 2011

Ricardo Charles (born 4 June 1983) is a Haitian footballer who plays as a striker. He plays for Victory Sportif Club and the Haiti national football team.
