= Gadiel Figueroa =

Puerto Rican soccer player

Personal information
- Full name: Gadiel Figueroa Robles
- Date of birth: 11 June 1986 (age 40)
- Place of birth: Caguas, Puerto Rico
- Position: Midfielder

Team information
- Current team: Sevilla FC Puerto Rico
- Number: 11

Senior career*
| Years | Team | Apps | (Gls) |
| 2008– | Sevilla FC Puerto Rico | 25 | (2) |

International career
| 2008– | Puerto Rico | 5 | (0) |
- * Club domestic league appearances and goals as of 9 July 2008

Gadiel Figueroa Robles is a Puerto Rican soccer player who plays Midfielder for Sevilla FC Puerto Rico in the Puerto Rico Soccer League. Figueroa also plays for the Puerto Rican national team.

== International goals ==
| # | Date | Venue | Opponent | Score | Result | Competition |
|---|---|---|---|---|---|---|
| ? | 6 October 2010 | Bayamon | Cayman Islands | 2-0 | Win | 2010 Caribbean Championship |
