= Basil Wong =

Sint Maartener footballer (born 1986)

Personal information
- Full name: Basil Germaine Wong
- Date of birth: 11 March 1986 (age 40)
- Place of birth: Crooked River, Jamaica
- Positions: Midfielder; right-back

Team information
- Current team: Flames United
- Number: 9

Senior career*
| Years | Team | Apps | (Gls) |
| 2015–2016 | Concordia | | |
| 2016–2021 | Reggae Lions | | |
| 2021– | Flames United | | |

International career^{‡}
| 2018– | Sint Maarten | 2 | (0) |
- * Club domestic league appearances and goals as of 26 May 2021 ‡ National team caps and goals as of 26 May 2021

Basil Germaine Wong (born 11 March 1986) is a Sint Maartener footballer who plays as a midfielder for Flames United.

== International career ==
On 25 July 2018, Wong made his debut for Sint Maarten in a friendly against the British Virgin Islands. He made his competitive debut on 12 October 2018 in a Nations League qualifying match against Bermuda.
