= Ligue Haïtienne =

Haitian association football league

- Founded: 1937
- Country: Haiti
- Confederation: CONCACAF
- Number of clubs: 18
- Level on pyramid: 1
- Relegation to: Division 2
- Domestic cup(s): Coupe d'Haïti; Trophée des Champions
- International cup(s): Regional; CONCACAF Caribbean Cup; Continental; CONCACAF Champions Cup
- Current champions: Violette AC (2025–26 Série de Clôture)
- Most championships: Racing CH (14 titles)
- Top scorer: Jean-Robert Menelas (116 goals)
- Broadcaster(s): Canal+
- Website: https://liguehaitienne.com/
- Current: 2025–26 Ligue Haïtienne

Ligue Haïtienne (French pronunciation: [liɡ ajisjɛ̃n]; Haitian League), is a Haitian professional league, governed by the Haitian Football Federation, for association football clubs. It is the country's primary football competition and serves as the top division of the Haitian football league system. Contested by 18 clubs, it operates on a system of promotion and relegation with Division 2, although the current format has been changed due to violence in the country, with 3 regional groups consisting of 14 teams, after a three-year hiatus.

Clubs also compete against continental rivals in the CFU Club Shield, CONCACAF Caribbean Cup, and CONCACAF Champions Cup.

== History ==
=== Foundation ===
It was created in 1937 and is headed by the Fédération Haïtienne de Football, the official governing body of football in the country. The league champion qualifies for the CONCACAF Caribbean Cup for a spot to participate in the CONCACAF Champions Cup. 20 teams participate in this league and compete for the national title. Racing CH, with 14 national titles, is the most successful club in the league to date.

== Previous winners ==
Since 2002 (with the exception of 2012 and 2013), the league has employed a two-stage season with separate champions for both stages, a system found in many Latin American countries. In French-speaking Haiti, "O" stands for Ouverture (opening), corresponding to the Spanish Apertura, and "F" stands for Fermeture or "C" stands for Clôture (closing), corresponding to the Spanish Clausura.

Year	Winner	City
1937–38	Racing CH	Port-au-Prince
1939	Violette AC	Port-au-Prince
1940	Hatüey Bacardi Club	Port-au-Prince
1941	Racing CH	Port-au-Prince
1942	Etoile Haïtienne	Port-au-Prince
1943	Arsenal FC	Port-au-Prince
1944	Etoile Haïtienne	Port-au-Prince
1945	Hatüey Bacardi Club	Port-au-Prince
1946	Racing CH	Port-au-Prince
1947	Racing CH	Port-au-Prince
1948	Excelsior AC	Port-au-Prince
1949	championship interrupted	
1950	Excelsior AC	Port-au-Prince
1951	Excelsior AC	Port-au-Prince
1952–53	Aigle Noir AC	Port-au-Prince
1953–54	Racing CH	Port-au-Prince
1954	no championship	
1955	Aigle Noir AC	Port-au-Prince
1956	Jeunesse Pétion-Ville	Pétion-Ville
1957	Violette AC	Port-au-Prince
1958	Racing CH	Port-au-Prince
1961	Etoile Haïtienne	Port-au-Prince
1962	Racing CH	Port-au-Prince
1963	Racing CH	Port-au-Prince
1964–65	not held	
1966	Racing CH	Port-au-Prince
1967	Racing CH	Port-au-Prince
1968	Violette AC	Port-au-Prince
1969	Racing CH	Port-au-Prince
1970	Aigle Noir AC	Port-au-Prince
1971	Don Bosco FC	Pétion-Ville
1972–82	not held	
1983	Violette AC	Port-au-Prince
1984–87	not held	
Championnat National
1987–88	Aigle Rouge des Gonaïves	Gonaïves
1988–89	FICA	Cap-Haïtien
1989–90	FICA	Cap-Haïtien
1990–91	FICA	Cap-Haïtien
1991–92	discontinued	
1992–93	Tempête FC	Saint-Marc
1993–94	FICA	Cap-Haïtien
1994–95	Violette AC	Port-au-Prince
1996	Racing FC	Gonaïves
1997	AS Capoise	Cap-Haïtien
1998	FICA	Cap-Haïtien
1999	Violette AC	Port-au-Prince
2000	Racing CH	Port-au-Prince
2001	FICA	Cap-Haïtien
2002 O	Roulado FC	La Gonâve
2002 F	Racing CH	Port-au-Prince
2003 O	Don Bosco FC	Pétion-Ville
2003 F	Roulado FC	La Gonâve
2004	not held	
2004–05 O	AS Mirebalais	Mirebalais
2004–05 F	Baltimore SC	Saint-Marc
2005–06 O	Baltimore SC	Saint-Marc
2005–06 F	Aigle Noir AC	Port-au-Prince
2007 O	Baltimore SC	Saint-Marc
2007 F	Cavaly AS	Léogâne
2008 O	Tempête FC	Saint-Marc
2008 F	Racing FC	Gonaïves
2009 O	Tempête FC	Saint-Marc
2009 F	Racing CH	Port-au-Prince
2010 O	Tempête FC	Saint-Marc
2010 C	Victory SC	Port-au-Prince
2011 O	Baltimore SC	Saint-Marc
2011 C	Tempête FC	Saint-Marc
2012	Valencia FC	Léogâne
2013	AS Mirebalais	Mirebalais
2014 O	America FC	Cayes
2014 C	Don Bosco FC	Pétion-Ville
2015 O	Don Bosco FC	Pétion-Ville
2015 C	FICA	Cap-Haïtien
2016 O	Racing FC	Gonaïves
2016 C	FICA	Cap-Haïtien
2017 O	Real Hope FA	Cap-Haïtien
2017 C	AS Capoise	Cap-Haïtien
2018 O	AS Capoise	Cap-Haïtien
2018 C	Don Bosco FC	Pétion-Ville
2019 O	Arcahaie FC	Arcahaie
2019 C	abandoned due to civil unrest	
2020 O	abandoned due to COVID-19	
2020 C	cancelled due to transition to fall/spring rhythm	
2020–21 O	Violette AC	Port-au-Prince
2020–21 C	abandoned	
2021–23	no competition	
2024	Real Hope FA	Cap-Haïtien
2025	FC Juventus des Cayes	Cayes
2025–26 O	Violette AC	Port-au-Prince
2025–26 C	Violette AC	Port-au-Prince

== Performance By Club ==
Club	City	Titles	Last title
Racing CH	Port-au-Prince	14	2009 F
Violette AC	Port-au-Prince	9	2025–26 C
FICA	Cap-Haïtien	8	2016 C
Tempête FC	Saint-Marc	5	2011 C
Don Bosco FC	Pétion-Ville	5	2018 C
Baltimore SC	Saint-Marc	4	2011 O
Aigle Noir AC	Port-au-Prince	4	2005–06 F
Etoile Haïtienne	Port-au-Prince	3	1944
Excelsior AC	Port-au-Prince	3	1951
Racing FC	Gonaïves	3	2016 O
AS Capoise	Cap-Haïtien	3	2018 O
AS Mirebalais	Mirebalais	2	2013
Hatüey Bacardi Club	Port-au-Prince	2	1945
Roulado FC	La Gonâve	2	2003 F
Real Hope FA	Cap-Haïtien	2	2024
America FC	Cayes	1	2014 O
Arcahaie FC	Arcahaie	1	2019 O
Arsenal FC	Port-au-Prince	1	1943
Cavaly AS	Léogâne	1	2007 F
Jeunesse Pétion-Ville	Pétion-Ville	1	1956
Victory SC	Port-au-Prince	1	2010 C
Valencia FC	Léogâne	1	2012
Aigle Rouge des Gonaïves	Gonaïves	1	1988
FC Juventus des Cayes	Cayes	1	2025

== Top goalscorers ==
Year	Name	Team	Goals
1999	(Haiti) Golman Pierre	FICA	19
2001	(Haiti) Golman Pierre	FICA	24
2002	(Haiti) Jean-Robert Menelas	Roulado FC	16
2005–06	(Haiti) Roscaldo Jérémie	AS Mirebalais	10
2008	(Haiti) Ricardo Charles	Victory SC	12
2015 O	(Haiti) Roobens Philogène (Haiti) Nerlin Saint-Vil	Ouanaminthe FC	11
2016 C	(Haiti) Roobens Philogène (Haiti) Mancini Telfort	Cavaly AS	9
2019	(Haiti) Elyvens Déjean	Don Bosco FC	8
2020	(Haiti) André Amy (Haiti) Elyvens Déjean	AS Cavaly; Don Bosco FC	4
2020–21 O	(Haiti) Angelo Exilus	Real Hope FA	15
2024	(Haiti) Ernst Clerger	América des Cayes	6
2025	(Haiti) Roberto Jean	Racing des Gonaïves	5
2025–26 O	(Haiti) Claudeson Stanley Céus	Racing des Gonaïves	8
2025–26 C	(Haiti) Sandino Saint Jean	FICA	7

== Media coverage ==
The Haitian Football Federation has an exclusive broadcasting agreement with French premium pay TV channel, Canal+. The agreement was made official on 7 March 2016, a five-year deal to start at the end of April, 2016. However the financial details are not disclosed. The deal includes coverage and live broadcasts; 15 matches of its choice for the 2016 season as well as interviews before and after each match.

Canal+ Haiti, a subsidiary, offers three packages to view games domestically.

== See also ==
- List of football clubs in Haiti
