= US Frères =

Haitian football club

- Full name: Union Sportive de Frères
- League: Championnat National D3
- 2014: Championnat National D2, 40th (relegated)
Away colours

Union Sportive de Frères (or simply US Frères) is a professional football club based in Pétion-Ville, Haiti. The club last played in the first division in the 2005–06 season.
