= Dynamite AC =

Haitian football club

- Full name: Dynamite Athletic Club
- Founded: 18 March 1988; 36 years ago
- Ground: Parc Levelt
- Chairman: Gino Jean-Pierre
- League: Championnat National D3
- 2014: Championnat National D2, 35th (relegated)
Away colours

Dynamite Athletic Club (French: Club Athlétique Dynamite) is a professional football club based in Saint-Marc, Haiti.The club last played in the first division in the 2010–11 season.
