= Cosmopolites SC =

Haitian association football club

Cosmopolites Sportif Club is an association football club based in Haiti.

== History ==
Cosmopolites SC was founded in 2015.
