= Racing FC (Haiti) =

Association football club in Haiti

- Full name: Racing Football Club
- Founded: 7 April 1962; 64 years ago
- Ground: Parc Stenio Vincent
- Chairman: Hervé Maxime
- Manager: Gauthier Jules
- League: Ligue Haïtienne
- 2016: Ligue Haïtienne, 2nd
Home colours

Racing Football Club, usually known as Racing Gonaïves, is a professional football club based in Gonaïves, Haiti.

== History ==
Racing des Gonaïves was founded on 7 April 1962, by a Catholic priest named Louis Simon. He named it after Racing Haïtien whom he was a fan of and donned the same yellow and blue colours.

== Honours ==
- Ligue Haïtienne: 3

1996, 2008 F, 2016 O

== International competitions ==
- CONCACAF Champions League: 4 appearances

1985 – first round (Caribbean) – lost against (Martinique) Golden Star (football club) 1 – 0 on aggregate (stage 1 of ?)
1991 – second round (Caribbean) – lost against (Martinique) US Marinoise 4 – 3 on aggregate (stage 2 of 7)
1993 – first round (Caribbean) – lost against (Martinique) Aiglon du Lamentin 4 – 0 on aggregate (stage 1 of 5)
1994 – first round (Caribbean) – withdrew against (French Guiana) FC AK Regina (stage 2 of 7)

- CONCACAF Cup Winners Cup: 1 appearance

1991 – Fourth place

- CFU Club Championship: 1 appearance

2010 – second round – Group E – 2nd place – 0 pts (stage 2 of 3) – lost against Puerto Rico Islanders – 0–2, 3–0; 5–0 on aggregate
