= América des Cayes =

Haitian football club

- Full name: América des Cayes
- Founded: 17 May 1973; 53 years ago
- Ground: Parc de Foot Land des Gabions des Cayes
- Capacity: 2,000
- Chairman: Kenley Thibault
- Coach: Andy Gethro Anselme
- League: Ligue Haïtienne
- 2016: Ligue Haïtienne, 11th
Home colours

América des Cayes is a professional football club based in Les Cayes, Haiti. They were promoted to the Ligue Haïtienne in 2009.

== Honours ==
- Ligue Haïtienne: 1

2014

== Current players ==
Note: Flags indicate national team as defined under FIFA eligibility rules; some limited exceptions apply. Players may hold more than one non-FIFA nationality.

No.	Pos.	Nation	Player
1	GK	HAI	Milord Johnny
2	DF	HAI	Edouard Jimmtry
3	MF	HAI	Rubin Jean Garry
4	DF	LCA	Luma Louinord
5	DF	HAI	Sauveur Gassendy
6	MF	AIA	Matheus Luckson
8	DF	HAI	François Alphonse Jephte
9	FW	HAI	Sainvil Pierre Ronald
10	FW	MSR	Jambon Johnson
12	DF	HAI	Cadet Philippe
13	DF	HAI	Esperance Harold
14	MF	HAI	Charles Jean Renaldo

No.	Pos.	Nation	Player
15	DF	HAI	Origene Woody Loralus
16	FW	HAI	Moulate Casimir
18	DF	HAI	Jean Frantz Sainvil
19	FW	HAI	Thermidor Packy
20	DF	HAI	Wilfred Gallahy
21	GK	HAI	Géel Pierre
22	GK	HAI	Jean Pierre Florant
23	FW	HAI	Dorvilier Herby
24	DF	HAI	Senat Jocelyn
25	GK	HAI	Dominique Marvens
26	MF	DMA	Olly Cassidy
