= Tempête FC =

Haitian football club

- Full name: Tempête Football Club
- Nickname: Bèl kolòn TFC
- Founded: 5 July 1970; 56 years ago
- Ground: Parc Levelt
- Capacity: 5,000
- Chairman: Ing Jean Alix Nezivar
- Manager: Herold Junior Charles
- League: Ligue Haïtienne
- 2016: Ligue Haïtienne, 12th
- Website: https://tempete-fc.com/
Home colours

Tempête Football Club is a professional football club based in Saint-Marc, Haiti. The club was founded in 1970 and competes in Haiti's top league, Ligue Haïtienne.

They hold a fierce rivalry with local club Baltimore SC.

== History ==
Tempête Football Club was founded on 5 July 1970 at the Boulevard of Freedom in Saint-Marc, Haiti. The club took its name from a thunderstorm that occurred during an afternoon match between local players. Fitting with this theme, the club adopted the colors blue and white for their kit.

Tempête won their first national league championship in 1992 as well as the Super Coupe d'Haïti, defeating second division champion Don Bosco FC. First President: Andre Laguerre 1970 – 1975

=== CONCACAF Champions League ===
After winning the national championship in 2010, Tempête FC was awarded one of three Caribbean spots in the preliminary round of the 2011–2012 CONCACAF Champions League, facing Monarcas Morelia of Mexico. The home match was to take place at Stade Sylvio Cator, but due to ongoing renovations following the 2010 Haiti earthquake both matches were played in Mexico.

== Honours ==
- Ligue Haïtienne: 5

1992, 2008 O, 2009 O, 2010 O, 2011 C

- Super Coupe d'Haïti: 1

1992

- Coupe d'Haïti: 5

1976, 1988, 1989, 2005, 2007

- Super 8: 2

2007, 2012

- Trophée des Champions d'Haïti: 3

2008, 2009, 2010

- Coupe des Grandes Antilles: 1

2012

== International competitions ==
- CONCACAF Champions League: 3 appearances

1989 – First round (Caribbean 1989) Lost against (Martinique) RC Rivière-Pilote, 0–0 (6–5 pen)
1993 – Forfeit due to political sanctions against Haiti.
2011 – Preliminary round: Lost to (Mexico) Monarcas Morelia 7–0 on aggregate (5–0 & 2–0)

- CFU Club Championship: 3 appearances

2009 – Fourth place
2010 – Bye to second round; withdrew
2011 – Runners-up

- Coupe des Grandes Antilles: 1 appearance

2012 – Champions

== Crests ==
Current Tempête FC crest

Former Tempête FC crest

== Coaches ==
- (Haiti) Jacques Michaud
- (Haiti) Eric Cadet
- (Haiti) Frantz Valcin (1992)
- (Haiti) Yves Elien (1976)
- (Haiti) Joseph Dénéus
- (Haiti) Wilfrid Jean-Baptiste
- (Haiti) Jean Michel Vaval
- (Haiti) Erns Nono Jean-Baptiste
- (Haiti) Raphael Delatour
- (Haiti) Witerson Odigé
- (Haiti) Alix Avin (1992–94)
- (Haiti) Makens Doriélan
- (Haiti) Conrad Destin
- (Haiti) Daniel Jean Charles
- (Haiti) Frantz Laguerre
- (Haiti) Pierre André Dorvilus
- (Haiti) Ronald Génescar
- (Haiti) Frantz Philippi
- (Haiti) Ronald Marseille
- (Haiti) Wilner Etienne
- (Haiti) Gérald Beauvais
- (Haiti) Miguel Saint-Jean
- (Haiti) Kenel Thomas
- (Haiti) John Sevère
- (Haiti) Garry Beauvil
- (Haiti) Jean Hubert Anglade
- (Haiti) Wilcuins Plaisir (2008–)
- (Haiti) Marc Ogé
- (Peru) Danilo Barriga
