= AS Mirebalais =

Haitian football club

- Full name: Association Sportive Mirebalais
- Founded: 16 August 2000
- Ground: Parc Nelson Petit-Frère
- Capacity: 2,000
- Chairman: Grégory Chevry
- League: Ligue Haïtienne
- 2016: Ligue Haïtienne, 8th
- Website: www.asmirebalais.com
Home colours	Away colours

Association Sportive Mirebalais (French pronunciation: [asɔsjɑsjɔ̃ spɔʁtiv miʁbalɛ]; commonly referred to as AS Mirebalais) is a professional football club based in Mirebalais, Haiti.

== History ==
Association Sportive Mirebalais is a result of a merger of all clubs from Mirebalais in 2000.
