= Baltimore SC =

Haitian football club

- Full name: Baltimore Sportif Club
- Founded: 1 August 1974; 52 years ago
- Ground: Parc Levelt
- Capacity: 5,500
- Chairman: Brice Arnaud
- Manager: Baptiste Philippe
- League: Ligue Haïtienne
- 2016: Ligue Haïtienne, 10th
Home colours

Baltimore Sportif Club is a professional football club based in Saint-Marc, Haiti.

They have consistently been one of the best clubs in the league. In 2006, it captured the double after winning the league and the Coupe d'Haïti.

They hold a fierce rivalry with local club Tempête FC.

== Honours ==
- Ligue Haïtienne: 4

2005 F, 2006 O, 2007 O, 2011 O.

- Coupe d'Haïti: 1

2006.

- Super 8: 1

2006.

- Trophée des Champions d'Haïti: 1

2007.

== International competitions ==
Results list Baltimore SC's goal tally first.

Win Draw Loss Fixture

Competition	Round	Club	Score
2006 CFU Club Championship	First Round	(Jamaica) Waterhouse	2–0
2006 CFU Club Championship	First Round	(Curaçao) UNDEBA	4–0
2006 CFU Club Championship	Semi-finals	(Trinidad and Tobago) San Juan Jabloteh	0–2
2007 CFU Club Championship	First Round	(Antigua and Barbuda) Bassa	2–1
2007 CFU Club Championship	First Round	(Curaçao) Jong Colombia	12–0
2007 CFU Club Championship	First Round	(Cuba) Pinar del Río	2–2
2007 CFU Club Championship	Quarter-finals	(Trinidad and Tobago) San Juan Jabloteh	0–1
2012 CFU Club Championship	First Round	(Puerto Rico) Bayamón	2–0
2012 CFU Club Championship	First Round	(Haiti) Victory	1–1
2026 CFU Club Shield	Round of 16	(United States Virgin Islands) Helenites	w/o
