= Parc Levelt =

Football stadium in Saint-Marc, Haiti

Coordinates: 19.1080°N 72.6958°W

- Interactive map of Parc Levelt
- Full name: Parc Levelt
- Location: Saint-Marc, Haiti
- Capacity: 5,000
- Surface: Grass

Tenants
- Baltimore; Tempête; Dynamite AC

Parc Levelt is a football stadium in Saint-Marc, Haiti. It was launched in December 1950. The stadium holds 5,000 spectators.
