= Mirebalais =

Mirebalais Mibalè
- Commune
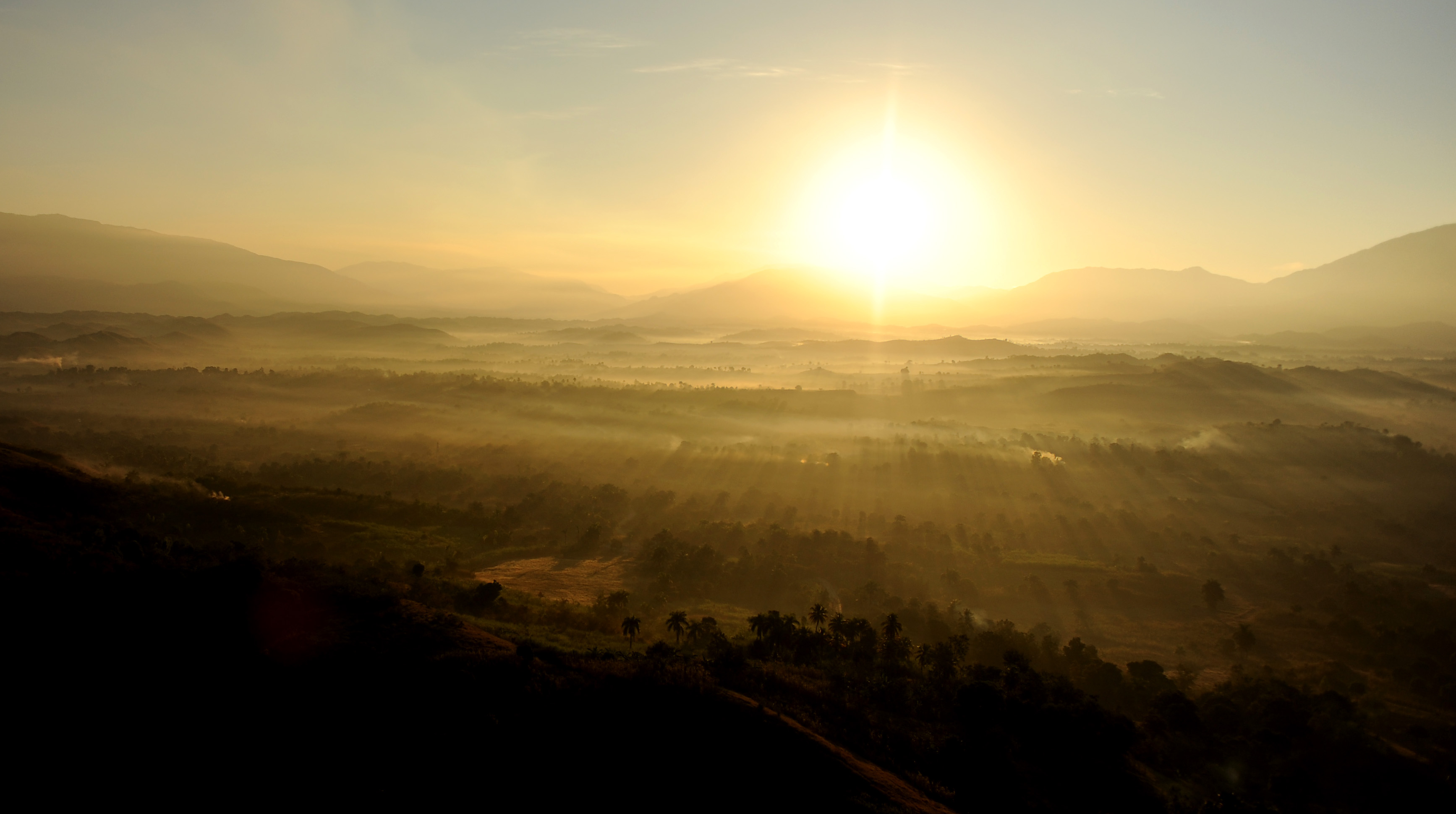
- Interactive map of Mirebalais
- Location in Haiti
- Coordinates: 18°50′0″N 72°6′19″W
- Country: Haiti
- Department: Centre
- Arrondissement: Mirebalais
- Established: 1702

Area
  - Total: 330.87 km^{2} (127.75 sq mi)
- Elevation: 163 m (535 ft)

Population (2015)
  - Total: 97,755
  - Density: 295.45/km^{2} (765.21/sq mi)
- Time zone: UTC−05:00 (EST)
  - Summer (DST): UTC−04:00 (EDT)
- Postal code: Postal code
- Area code: HT 5210

Mirebalais (French pronunciation: [miʁbalɛ]; Haitian Creole: Mibalè) is a commune in the Centre department of Haiti, approximately 60 km northeast of Port-au-Prince on National Road 3. The city was established in 1702.

American Rotarians have made a number of mission-type trips to the city and surrounding areas since the 1980s. Located along the hydroelectric power transmission grid, the city normally has electricity throughout the day and night.

During the United Nations occupation of 2005, Nepalese troops were stationed in the city, using the city jail as their headquarters.

A U.S. military C-17 cargo plane carried out a large airdrop of food and supplies here in the wake of the 2010 Haiti earthquake.

== Health ==
Mirebalais is served by the teaching hospital Hôpital Universitaire de Mirebalais, the largest solar-operated hospital in the world.

== Sport ==
Mirebalais is home to the AS Mirebalais sports team.

== Notable Mirebalaisians ==
- Benoît Batraville (1877-9 March 1920) successor to Charlemagne Péralte leading the Cacos resistance to the US occupation of Haiti.
- Melchie Dumornay (b. 2003), a footballer who plays for Lyon and the Haiti national team.
- Madame Max Adolphe (b. 1925; whereabouts unknown), a notorious torturer and leader of the Duvalier regime.
