= Cavaly AS =

Haitian football club

- Full name: Cavaly Association Sportive
- Nickname: Cheval Rouge
- Founded: 10 May 1975; 51 years ago
- Ground: Parc Julia Vilbon
- Capacity: 1,000
- Chairman: Rénald Lubin
- Manager: Nesly LeBlanc
- League: Ligue Haïtienne
- 2016: Ligue Haïtienne, 7th
- Website: https://cavalyasleogane.com/
Home colours

Cavaly Association Sportive (French pronunciation: [kavali asɔsjɑsjɔ̃ spɔʁtiv]; commonly referred to as Cavaly AS or simply Cavaly) is a professional football club based in Léogâne, Haiti, that currently plays in the Ligue Haïtienne.

== Honours ==
- Ligue Haïtienne 1: 2007 F
- CFU Club Championship 1: 2021

== International competitions ==
- CONCACAF Champions League : 1 appearance

2022 - Qualified vs New England Revolution. Withdrew February 15, 2022

- CFU Club Championship: 2 appearances

2009 – Second Round – lost against (Trinidad and Tobago) W Connection – 3–1, 0–1; 4–1 on aggregate
2021 - Final - vs (Suriname) Inter Moengotapoe W 3-0

== Current squad ==
Note: Flags indicate national team as defined under FIFA eligibility rules; some limited exceptions apply. Players may hold more than one non-FIFA nationality.

No.	Pos.	Nation	Player
—	DF	HAI	Frantz Gilles
—	MF	HAI	Chaderson Charlemagne
—	MF	HAI	Romulus Turlien
—	FW	HAI	Samuel Dalce

No.	Pos.	Nation	Player
—	FW	HAI	Kimberly Francois
—	FW	HAI	Alain Gustave
—	FW	HAI	Ricardo Pierre-Louis
