= Don Bosco FC =

Association football club in Haiti

- Full name: Don Bosco Football Club de Pétion-Ville
- Founded: 31 March 1963; 62 years ago
- Ground: Stade Pétion-Ville
- Capacity: 5,000
- Chairman: Louis Aurélien
- Manager: Claude Jean-Marc
- League: Ligue Haïtienne
- 2016: Ligue Haïtienne, 3rd
- Website: donboscofcpv.com
Home colours

Don Bosco Football Club de Pétion-Ville is a professional football club based in Pétion-Ville, Haiti.

The club won their first Haitian championship in 1971, and second in 2003, winning the league's Ouverture.

== Honours ==
- Ligue Haïtienne: 5

1971, 2003 O, 2014 C, 2015 O, 2018 C

== International competitions ==
- CONCACAF Champions League: 2 appearances

1972 – Second round - withdrew
2016–17 – Group Stage - 3rd in Group D

== Current squad ==
Nationality given from place of birth

Note: Flags indicate national team as defined under FIFA eligibility rules; some limited exceptions apply. Players may hold more than one non-FIFA nationality.

No.	Pos.	Nation	Player
1	GK	HAI	Normil, Yvenel
18	GK	HAI	Benet, Philippe
21	GK	HAI	Guillaume, Jean Garry
—	DF	HAI	Pierre Richard, Bruny
—	DF	HAI	Saurel, Olrish
—	DF	HAI	François, Alain
—	DF	HAI	Noncent, Windsor
—	DF	HAI	Darius, Danny
—	DF	HAI	Sanon, Stanley
—	DF	HAI	Ronsard, Othniel
—	DF	HAI	Mathieu, Nikelson
4	MF	HAI	Joineus, Michelet

No.	Pos.	Nation	Player
—	MF	HAI	St. Cyr, James
—	MF	HAI	Dorceus, Philbert
—	MF	HAI	Sylvestre Noel
—	MF	HAI	Frederic Simon
—	MF	HAI	Jean Dieulemps
—	MF	HAI	Wilson Blanc
8	FW	HAI	Reginald Herteulou
9	FW	HAI	Wadson Augustin
—	FW	HAI	Peguero Jean Philippe
—	FW	HAI	Monumat Junior Constant
—	FW	HAI	Jean Ademar Alliance

== Crests ==
Their new crest.

Their first and oldest crest.
