= Racing CH =

Association football club in Haiti

Racing Haïtien
- Full name: Racing Club Haïtien
- Nickname: Le Vieux Lion
- Founded: 23 March 1923; 103 years ago
- Ground: Stade Sylvio Cator
- Capacity: 15,000
- Coordinates: 18°32′9.81″N 72°20′32.79″W
- Chairman: Sylvain Olivier
- Manager: Étienne Clément
- League: Ligue Haïtienne
- 2016: Ligue Haïtienne, 14th
Home colours

Racing Club Haïtien is a professional football club based in Port-au-Prince, Haiti. It is one of the most successful clubs in the country's history.

== History ==
The club has won the most league championships in Haitian club history, 11, winning in 1937-38, 1941, 1946, 1947, 1953-4, 1958, 1962, 1969, 2000, 2002 Clôture and 2009 Clôture. In 1941, it captured the double after winning the league and the Coupe d'Haïti.

They are also one of only two Haitian clubs to have ever won the CONCACAF Champions' Cup, along with Violette AC, winning in 1963.

== Honours ==
=== Domestic ===
- Ligue Haïtienne (14): 1938, 1941, 1946, 1947, 1954, 1958, 1962, 1963, 1966, 1967, 1969, 2000, 2002 C, 2009 C
- Coupe d'Haïti (2): 1941, 1944

=== International ===
==== Continental ====
- CONCACAF Champions Cup (1): 1963

=== Friendly ===
- Tournoi Haiti-Jamaique-Etats-Unis (1): 1968

== International appearances ==
- CONCACAF Champions League

1963 – CONCACAF Champion
1967 – first round (Caribbean) – group stage – 5th placed – 2 pts (stage 1 of 3)
1970 – final round (Caribbean) – lost against (Suriname) Transvaal (stage 3 of 3); unknown results
1975 – Unknown results; withdrew or disqualified
1978 – first round (Caribbean) – lost against (Guyana) Pele FC 4 – 2 on aggregate (stage 1 of 4)

- CFU Club Championship: 1 appearance

2001 – second round – Group A – 2nd place – 2 pts
