= Trinidad and Tobago football clubs in international competition =

Trinidad and Tobago football clubs have entered international competitions since 1967, when Regiment of the Port of Spain Football League took part in the 1967 CONCACAF Champions' Cup. Since the nation's first international club competition, several association football clubs from Trinidad and Tobago have entered North America, Central America, and Caribbean competitions (CONCACAF Champions' Cup/Champions League and CFU Club Championship).

The CONCACAF Champions' Cup started in 1962, but there was no Trinidad and Tobago representative during that inaugural season as the competition was open to eight teams from seven countries: Netherlands Antilles, Costa Rica, El Salvador, Guatemala, Haiti, Honduras, and Mexico. Since their first appearance, Trinidad and Tobago clubs have claimed the Champions' Cup on two occasions with Defence Force winning the title in 1978 and again in 1985 in the Teteron Boys' treble-winning season.

Since the establishment of the CFU Club Championship in 1997, clubs from the Caribbean Islands that are members of the Caribbean Football Union, have competed in the region's qualification tournament for the CONCACAF Champions' Cup and Champions League. The first club to compete in the regional competition was United Petrotrin of the Semi-Professional League. The Oilmen won the inaugural tournament after defeating Seba United of Jamaica 2–1 to advance to the 1997 Champions' Cup. Since the country's first appearance in the CFU Club Championship, Trinidad and Tobago clubs have claimed the title on eleven occasions with an additional nine runners-up finishes.

== Qualification for continental competitions ==
| Competition | Qualifiers | Notes |
|---|---|---|
| CFU Club Championship | Club finishing as the TT Pro League champions | Clubs enter competition in the first round |
| CFU Club Championship | Club finishing as the TT Pro League runners-up | Clubs enter competition in the first round |

== Champions of continental competitions ==
| CONCACAF Champions League | Caribbean Club Championship |
|---|---|
| 1978 – Defence Force | 1997 – United Petrotrin |
| 1985 – Defence Force (2) | 1998 – Joe Public |
| | 2000 – Joe Public (2) |
| | 2001 – Defence Force |
| | 2002 – W Connection |
| | 2003 – San Juan Jabloteh |
| | 2006 – W Connection (2) |
| | 2009 – W Connection (3) |
| | 2012 – Caledonia AIA |
| | 2015 – Central FC |
| | 2016 – Central FC (2) |

== Full continental competition record ==
=== CONCACAF Champions' Cup and Champions League ===
| Season | Team | Progress | Score | Opponents | Venue(s) |
|---|---|---|---|---|---|
| 1962 | None entered | | | | |
| 1963 | None entered | | | | |
| 1967 | Regiment | 2nd in group stage | | (Netherlands Antilles) CRKSV Jong Colombia, (Jamaica) Regiment, (Bermuda) Somerset Trojans, (Haiti) Racing Club Haïtien | |
| 1968 | None entered | | | | |
| 1969 | None entered | | | | |
| 1970 | Maple Club | First round | 1–4 | (Suriname (Kingdom of the Netherlands)) Transvaal | |
| 1971 | None entered | | | | |
| 1972 | None entered | | | | |
| 1973 | None entered | | | | |
| 1974 | None entered | | | | |
| 1975 | None entered | | | | |
| 1976 | Tesoro Palo Seco | Second round | 1–6 | (Suriname) Voorwaarts | |
| 1976 | Malvern United | Second round | 0–2 | (Suriname) Robinhood | |
| 1977 | Defence Force | First round | 0–4 | (Haiti) Violette | |
| 1977 | TECSA | Fourth round | 2–4 | (Suriname) Robinhood | |
| 1978 | TECSA | First round | 2–3 | (Suriname) Voorwaarts | |
| 1978 | Defence Force | Winners | 4–1 | (Suriname) Voorwaarts | |
| 1979 | Tesoro Palo Seco | Third round | w/o | (Suriname) Robinhood | |
| 1979 | Defence Force | Third round | 2–3 | (Netherlands Antilles) CRKSV Jong Colombia | |
| 1980 | Police | First round | 2–4 | (Suriname) Transvaal | |
| 1980 | Defence Force | Second round | w/o | (Suriname) Robinhood | |
| 1981 | Memphis | First round | 0–3 | (Netherlands Antilles) SUBT | |
| 1981 | Defence Force | First round | w/o | (Suriname) Transvaal | |
| 1982 | Tesoro Palo Seco | First round | w/o | (Netherlands Antilles) SUBT | |
| 1982 | Defence Force | Third round | 3–6 | (Suriname) Robinhood | |
| 1983 | Defence Force | First round | 1–3 | (Suriname) Robinhood | |
| 1983 | Memphis | First round | 4–5 | (Netherlands Antilles) SUBT | |
| 1984 | Defence Force | First round | w/o | (Haiti) Violette | |
| 1985 | Defence Force | Winners | 2–1 | (Honduras) Olimpia | 2–0 at National Stadium, 0–1 at Estadio Francisco Morazán |
| 1986 | Sirocco | First round | 2–4 | (Trinidad and Tobago) Trintoc | |
| 1986 | Trintoc | Semifinals | 4–4 (3–4p) | (Suriname) Transvaal | |
| 1987 | Trintoc | Semifinals | 2–3 | (Trinidad and Tobago) Defence Force | |
| 1987 | Defence Force | Final | 1–3 | (Mexico) América | 1–1 at National Stadium, 0–2 at Estadio Azteca |
| 1988 | Trintoc | First round | 1–2 | Excelsior | |
| 1988 | Defence Force | Final | 0–4 | (Honduras) Olimpia | 0–2 at Estadio Excélsior, 0–2 at Estadio Nacional |
| 1989 | Defence Force | 3rd in group stage | | (Cuba) FC Pinar del Río, (Trinidad and Tobago) Trintoc, (Netherlands Antilles) Juventus, (Netherlands Antilles) CRKSV Jong Colombia | |
| 1989 | Trintoc | 2nd in group stage | | (Cuba) FC Pinar del Río, (Trinidad and Tobago) Defence Force, (Netherlands Antilles) Juventus, (Netherlands Antilles) CRKSV Jong Colombia | |
| 1990 | None entered | | | | |
| 1991 | Defence Force | Third round | 2–3 | (Trinidad and Tobago) Police | |
| 1991 | Police | Final | 2–4 | (Mexico) Puebla | 1–3 at Estadio Cuauhtémoc, 1–1 at Skinner Park |
| 1992 | Trintoc | First round | 1–2 | (Suriname) Transvaal | |
| 1992 | Mayaro United | Second round | 1–2 | (Suriname) Robinhood | |
| 1993 | Hawks | First round | w/o | (Netherlands Antilles) Sithoc | |
| 1993 | Trintoc | Semifinals | 0–1 | (Suriname) Robinhood | |
| 1994 | None entered | | | | |
| 1995 | None entered | | | | |
| 1996 | None entered | | | | |
| 1997 | United Petrotrin | Quarterfinals | 0–1 | (United States) D.C. United | Robert F. Kennedy Memorial Stadium |
| 1998 | Joe Public | Quarterfinals | 0–8 | (United States) D.C. United | Robert F. Kennedy Memorial Stadium |
| 1999 | Joe Public | Quarterfinals | 0–2 | (United States) Chicago Fire | Soldier Field |
| 2000 | Joe Public | Quarterfinals | 0–1 | (Mexico) Pachuca | Titan Stadium |
| 2002 | W Connection | Round of 16 | 0–3 | (United States) Kansas City Wizards | 0–1 at Manny Ramjohn Stadium, 0–2 at Arrowhead Stadium |
| 2002 | Defence Force | Round of 16 | 1–4 | (Mexico) Pachuca | 1–0 at Hasely Crawford Stadium, 0–4 at Estadio Hidalgo |
| 2003 | W Connection | Round of 16 | 5–6 | (Mexico) Toluca | 3–3 at Manny Ramjohn Stadium, 2–3 at Estadio Nemesio Díez |
| 2004 | San Juan Jabloteh | Quarterfinals | 5–6 | (United States) Chicago Fire | 5–2 at Hasely Crawford Stadium, 0–4 at Soldier Field |
| 2005 | No clubs qualified for competition | | | | |
| 2006 | No clubs qualified for competition | | | | |
| 2007 | W Connection | Quarterfinals | 2–4 | (Mexico) Guadalajara | 2–1 at Manny Ramjohn Stadium, 0–3 at Estadio Jalisco |
| 2008 | No clubs qualified for competition | | | | |
| 2008–09 | Joe Public | 4th in group stage | | (Mexico) Atlante, (Canada) Montreal Impact, (Honduras) Olimpia | |
| 2009–10 | San Juan Jabloteh | 4th in group stage | | (Mexico) Toluca, (Honduras) Marathón, (United States) D.C. United | |
| 2009–10 | W Connection | 3rd in group stage | | (Mexico) UNAM, (Guatemala) Comunicaciones, (Honduras) Real España | |
| 2010–11 | San Juan Jabloteh | Preliminary round | 0–6 | (Mexico) Santos Laguna | 0–1 at Marvin Lee Stadium, 0–5 at Estadio Corona |
| 2010–11 | Joe Public | 4th in group stage | | (Mexico) Santos Laguna, (United States) Columbus Crew, (Guatemala) Municipal | |
| 2011–12 | No clubs qualified for competition | | | | |
| 2012–13 | Caledonia AIA | 3rd in group stage | | (United States) Seattle Sounders FC, (Honduras) Marathón | |
| 2012–13 | W Connection | 3rd in group stage | | (Guatemala) Xelajú, (Mexico) Guadalajara | |
| 2013–14 | W Connection | 3rd in group stage | | (Panama) Árabe Unido, (United States) Houston Dynamo | |
| 2013–14 | Caledonia AIA | 3rd in group stage | | (Guatemala) Comunicaciones, (Mexico) Toluca | |
| 2014–15 | No clubs qualified for competition | | | | |
| 2015–16 | Central FC | 2nd in group stage | | (Guatemala) C.S.D. Comunicaciones, (United States) LA Galaxy | |
| 2015–16 | W Connection | 3rd in group stage | | (Costa Rica) Deportivo Saprissa, (Mexico) Santos Laguna | |
| 2016–17 | Central FC | | | | |
| 2016–17 | W Connection | | | | |

=== CFU Club Championship ===
| Season | Team | Progress | Score | Opponents | Venue(s) |
|---|---|---|---|---|---|
| 1997 | United Petrotrin | Winners | 2–1 | (Jamaica) Seba United | Palo Seco Velodrome |
| 1998 | San Juan Jabloteh | Quarterfinals | 0–2 | Aiglon du Lamentin | National Stadium |
| 1998 | Caledonia AIA | Final | 0–1 | (Trinidad and Tobago) Joe Public | Marvin Lee Stadium |
| 1998 | Joe Public | Winners | 1–0 | (Trinidad and Tobago) Caledonia AIA | Marvin Lee Stadium |
| 2000 | W Connection | 2nd in final round | | (Trinidad and Tobago) Joe Public, (Jamaica) Harbour View, (Haiti) Carioca FC | |
| 2000 | Joe Public | Winners | | (Trinidad and Tobago) W Connection, (Jamaica) Harbour View, (Haiti) Carioca FC | |
| 2001 | W Connection | 1st in final round | | (Haiti) Racing Club Haïtien, (Netherlands Antilles) CRKSV Jong Colombia | |
| 2001 | Defence Force | Winners | | Suriname National Lager, (Haiti) Roulado | |
| 2002 | W Connection | Winners | | (Jamaica) Harbour View, US Robert | |
| 2003 | W Connection | Final | 3–3 (2–4p) | (Trinidad and Tobago) San Juan Jabloteh | 1–2 at Manny Ramjohn Stadium, 2–1 at Hasely Crawford Stadium |
| 2003 | San Juan Jabloteh | Winners | 3–3 (4–2p) | (Trinidad and Tobago) W Connection | 2–1 at Manny Ramjohn Stadium, 1–2 at Hasely Crawford Stadium |
| 2004 | San Juan Jabloteh | Semifinals | 1–2 | (Jamaica) Tivoli Gardens | 1–1 at Hasely Crawford Stadium, 0–1 at Railway Oval |
| 2005 | North East Stars | Quarterfinals | w/o | (Suriname) Robinhood | |
| 2006 | San Juan Jabloteh | Final | 0–1 | (Trinidad and Tobago) W Connection | Manny Ramjohn Stadium |
| 2006 | W Connection | Winners | 1–0 | (Trinidad and Tobago) San Juan Jabloteh | Manny Ramjohn Stadium |
| 2007 | San Juan Jabloteh | Third place | 0–1 | Puerto Rico Islanders | 0–1 at Estadio Juan Ramón Loubriel, 0–0 at Hasely Crawford Stadium |
| 2007 | Joe Public | Final | 1–2 | (Jamaica) Harbour View | Marvin Lee Stadium |
| 2009 | San Juan Jabloteh | Third place | 2–1 | (Haiti) Tempête | Marvin Lee Stadium |
| 2009 | W Connection | Winners | 2–1 | Puerto Rico Islanders | Marvin Lee Stadium |
| 2010 | San Juan Jabloteh | 3rd in final round | | Puerto Rico Islanders, (Trinidad and Tobago) Joe Public, Bayamón FC | |
| 2010 | Joe Public | 2nd in final round | | Puerto Rico Islanders, (Trinidad and Tobago) San Juan Jabloteh, Bayamón FC | |
| 2011 | Caledonia AIA | Second round | 1–1 (2–3p) | (Haiti) Tempête | 0–1 at Ato Boldon Stadium, 1–0 at Parc Levelt |
| 2011 | Defence Force | Semifinals | 0–0 (2–4p) | (Haiti) Tempête | Providence Stadium |
| 2012 | W Connection | Final | 1–1 (3–4p) | (Trinidad and Tobago) Caledonia AIA | Manny Ramjohn Stadium |
| 2012 | Caledonia AIA | Winners | 1–1 (4–3p) | (Trinidad and Tobago) W Connection | Manny Ramjohn Stadium |
| 2013 | Caledonia AIA | Playoff round | 3–2 | (Jamaica) Portmore United | 1–0 at Hasely Crawford Stadium, 2–2 at Ato Boldon Stadium |
| 2013 | W Connection | 1st in final round | | (Trinidad and Tobago) Caledonia AIA, (Antigua and Barbuda) Antigua Barracuda FC | |
| 2014 | Caledonia AIA | 2nd in first round | | (Haiti) Mirebalais, (Jamaica) Waterhouse, (Suriname) Inter Moengotapoe | |
| 2014 | Defence Force | 2nd in first round | | (Guyana) Alpha United FC, (Jamaica) Harbour View | |
| 2015 | Central FC | Winners | 2–1 | (Trinidad and Tobago) W Connection | Ato Boldon Stadium |
| 2015 | W Connection | Final | 1–2 | (Trinidad and Tobago) Central FC | Ato Boldon Stadium |
| 2016 | Central FC | Winners | 3–0 | (Trinidad and Tobago) W Connection | Stade Sylvio Cator |
| 2016 | W Connection | Final | 0–3 | (Trinidad and Tobago) Central FC | Stade Sylvio Cator |

== TT Pro League international performance ==
Since the inaugural season of the TT Pro League in 1999, the league champion and runners-up have entered the CFU Club Championship to earn qualification in the CONCACAF Champions' Cup/Champions League. The first Pro League club to compete in international competition was Joe Public when the club entered the 1999 CONCACAF Champions' Cup. However, the Eastern Lions qualified for the competition through the 1998 CFU Club Championship as a member of the Semi-Professional League the previous season. The 2000 CFU Club Championship was the first occurrence of clubs having earned qualification through final position in the Pro League. Defence Force entered as the 1999 Pro League champion, W Connection as runners-up, and Joe Public as the CFU Club Championship holders. Joe Public won the competition to provide the Pro League with its first international championship.

Pro League clubs have won the CFU Club Championship for Caribbean-based clubs on eleven occasions and nine additional runners-up finishes. However, no Pro League club has won the Champions' Cup or Champions League. The best performance occurred in the 2000, 2004, and 2007 Champions' Cup when Joe Public, San Juan Jabloteh, and W Connection, respectively, entered the quarterfinal round.

=== CONCACAF Champions' Cup and Champions League ===
Note: The CONCACAF Champions' Cup began in 1962 and was renamed the CONCACAF Champions League in 2008–09 (abbreviated here to 2009). Trinidad and Tobago clubs began entering the continental competition in 1967. After the inauguration of the TT Pro League in 1999, teams from the Pro League were playing in CONCACAF competition during that season (abbreviated to 2009), even though they had actually qualified through the old Semi-Professional League the previous season.

Trinidad and Tobago finalists (1962–present)

For comparison, this table shows how Trinidad and Tobago clubs have performed at the top level of CONCACAF football before the TT Pro League era. Defence Force remains the only team from Trinidad and Tobago to win the Champions' Cup in 1978 and 1985. Since the Teteron Boys' treble-winning season, the best performance by a Trinidad and Tobago team came in 1987 and 1988 when Defence Force, and again in 1991 when Police finished as runners-up.

| Club | Winners | Runners-up | Seasons won | Seasons runners-up |
|---|---|---|---|---|
| (Trinidad and Tobago) Defence Force | 2 | 2 | 1978, 1985 | 1987, 1988 |
| (Trinidad and Tobago) Police | 0 | 1 | | 1991 |

All finalists performance by club (1962–present)

On this table, covering before and during the TT Pro League era, the best-performing ten clubs are listed. Pro League club, Defence Force, is tied for ninth best-performing club in the CONCACAF Champions' Cup and Champions League.

| Club | Winners | Runners-up | Seasons won | Seasons runner-up |
|---|---|---|---|---|
| (Mexico) Cruz Azul | 5 | 2 | 1969, 1970, 1971, 1996, 1997 | 2009, 2010 |
| (Mexico) América | 5 | 0 | 1977, 1987, 1990, 1992, 2006 | |
| (Mexico) Pachuca | 4 | 0 | 2002, 2007, 2008, 2010 | |
| (Costa Rica) Saprissa | 3 | 2 | 1993, 1995, 2005 | 2004, 2008 |
| (Mexico) UNAM | 3 | 1 | 1980, 1982, 1989 | 2005 |
| (Mexico) Monterrey | 3 | 0 | 2011, 2012, 2013 | |
| (Suriname) Transvaal | 2 | 3 | 1973, 1981 | 1974, 1975, 1986 |
| (Costa Rica) Alajuelense | 2 | 3 | 1986, 2004 | 1971, 1992, 1999 |
| (Honduras) Olimpia | 2 | 2 | 1972, 1988 | 1985, 2000 |
| (Mexico) Toluca | 2 | 2 | 1968, 2003 | 1998, 2006 |
| (Trinidad and Tobago) Defence Force | 2 | 2 | 1978, 1985 | 1987, 1988 |

All finalists performance by nation

For comparison, the following tables show the performance of all finalists in CONCACAF Champions' Cup and Champions League before and during the TT Pro League era. Although Trinidad and Tobago clubs performed well before the establishment of the TT Pro League, professional clubs have not reached the final of the continental competition.

Trinidad and Tobago performance (1962–present)
| Nation | Winners | Runners-up |
|---|---|---|
| Mexico | 29 | 14 |
| Costa Rica | 6 | 5 |
| El Salvador | 3 | 1 |
| Suriname | 2 | 8 |
| Guatemala | 2 | 3 |
| Honduras | 2 | 3 |
| Trinidad and Tobago | 2 | 3 |
| United States | 2 | 2 |
| Haiti | 2 | 0 |
| Cuba | 0 | 2 |
| Curaçao | 0 | 2 |

TT Pro League performance (2000–present)
| Nation | Winners | Runners-up |
|---|---|---|
| Mexico | 10 | 9 |
| Costa Rica | 2 | 2 |
| United States | 1 | 1 |
| Honduras | 0 | 1 |
| Trinidad and Tobago | 0 | 0 |

=== CFU Club Championship ===
The Caribbean Football Union established the Caribbean Club Championship in 1997 as a qualification tournament for the CONCACAF Champions' Cup (later renamed the Champions League). The inaugural season of the TT Pro League was in 1999, so teams entering the regional competition based on Pro League finish began in 2000.

TT Pro League finalists (2000–present)

This table shows how Trinidad and Tobago clubs have performed in the CFU Club Championship since the start of the TT Pro League era. The table is currently headed by W Connection, with three wins, followed by Central FC (2), Morvant Caledonia United (1), Defence Force (1), Joe Public (1), and San Juan Jabloteh (1).

| Club | Winners | Runners-up | Seasons won | Seasons runners-up |
|---|---|---|---|---|
| (Trinidad and Tobago) W Connection | 3 | 6 | 2002, 2006, 2009 | 2000, 2001, 2003, 2012, 2015, 2016 |
| (Trinidad and Tobago) Central FC | 2 | 0 | 2015, 2016 | |
| (Trinidad and Tobago) Joe Public | 1 | 2 | 2000 | 2007, 2010 |
| (Trinidad and Tobago) San Juan Jabloteh | 1 | 1 | 2003 | 2006 |
| (Trinidad and Tobago) Morvant Caledonia United | 1 | 0 | 2012 | |
| (Trinidad and Tobago) Defence Force | 1 | 0 | 2001 | |

Trinidad and Tobago finalists (1997–present)

This table combines the Trinidad and Tobago totals before and during the TT Pro League era. It shows that thanks to its earlier win in 1998, Joe Public, with two wins, have moved into second place, but still trail behind W Connection with three wins.

| Club | Winners | Runners-up | Seasons won | Seasons runners-up |
|---|---|---|---|---|
| (Trinidad and Tobago) W Connection | 3 | 6 | 2002, 2006, 2009 | 2000, 2001, 2003, 2012, 2015, 2016 |
| (Trinidad and Tobago) Joe Public | 2 | 2 | 1998, 2000 | 2007, 2010 |
| (Trinidad and Tobago) Central FC | 2 | 0 | 2015, 2016 | |
| (Trinidad and Tobago) Morvant Caledonia United | 1 | 1 | 2012 | 1998 |
| (Trinidad and Tobago) San Juan Jabloteh | 1 | 1 | 2003 | 2006 |
| (Trinidad and Tobago) Defence Force | 1 | 0 | 2001 | |
| (Trinidad and Tobago) United Petrotrin | 1 | 0 | 1997 | |

All finalists' performance by club (1997–present)

On this table, covering before and during the TT Pro League era, the best-performing Pro League club, W Connection, is also the best-performing club in the CFU Club Championship ahead of fellow Pro League clubs Joe Public and Central FC, Puerto Rico Islanders, and Jamaican club Harbour View.

| Club | Winners | Runners-up | Seasons won | Seasons runners-up |
|---|---|---|---|---|
| (Trinidad and Tobago) W Connection | 3 | 6 | 2002, 2006, 2009 | 2000, 2001, 2003, 2012, 2015, 2016 |
| (Trinidad and Tobago) Joe Public | 2 | 2 | 1998, 2000 | 2007, 2010 |
| Puerto Rico Islanders | 2 | 1 | 2010, 2011 | 2009 |
| (Trinidad and Tobago) Central FC | 2 | 0 | 2015, 2016 | |
| (Jamaica) Harbour View | 2 | 0 | 2004, 2007 | |
| (Trinidad and Tobago) Morvant Caledonia United | 1 | 1 | 2012 | 1998 |
| (Trinidad and Tobago) San Juan Jabloteh | 1 | 1 | 2003 | 2006 |
| (Jamaica) Portmore United | 1 | 0 | 2005 | |
| (Trinidad and Tobago) Defence Force | 1 | 0 | 2001 | |
| (Trinidad and Tobago) United Petrotrin | 1 | 0 | 1997 | |
| (Haiti) Tempête | 0 | 1 | | 2011 |
| (Suriname) Robinhood | 0 | 1 | | 2005 |
| (Jamaica) Tivoli Gardens | 0 | 1 | | 2004 |
| (Jamaica) Arnett Gardens | 0 | 1 | | 2002 |
| (Jamaica) Seba United | 0 | 1 | | 1997 |

All finalists' performance by nation

For comparison, the following tables show the performance of all finalists in the CFU Club Championship before and during the TT Pro League era, when Trinidad and Tobago were narrowly in first place in terms of number of wins, compared to having by far the most finalists compared to other nations.

Trinidad and Tobago performance (1997–present)
| Nation | Winners | Runners-up |
|---|---|---|
| Trinidad and Tobago | 11 | 10 |
| Jamaica | 3 | 3 |
| Puerto Rico | 2 | 1 |
| Haiti | 0 | 1 |
| Suriname | 0 | 1 |

TT Pro League performance (2000–present)
| Nation | Winners | Runners-up |
|---|---|---|
| Trinidad and Tobago | 9 | 9 |
| Jamaica | 3 | 2 |
| Puerto Rico | 2 | 1 |
| Haiti | 0 | 1 |
| Suriname | 0 | 1 |
