= 2002 CFU Club Championship =

Tournament details
- Dates: 17 October – 15 December
- Teams: 10 (from 7 associations)

Final positions
- Champions: (Jamaica) Arnett Gardens and (Trinidad and Tobago) W Connection (1st and 2nd title)

Tournament statistics
- Matches played: 10
- Goals scored: 37 (3.7 per match)
- Top scorer(s): (Jamaica) Fabian Taylor (Harbour View); 4 goals

The 2002 Caribbean Football Union Club Championship was an international club football competition held in the Caribbean to determine the region's qualifiers to the CONCACAF Champions' Cup.

Group winners Arnett Gardens of Jamaica and W Connection of Trinidad and Tobago advanced to the 2003 CONCACAF Champions' Cup.

== Teams ==
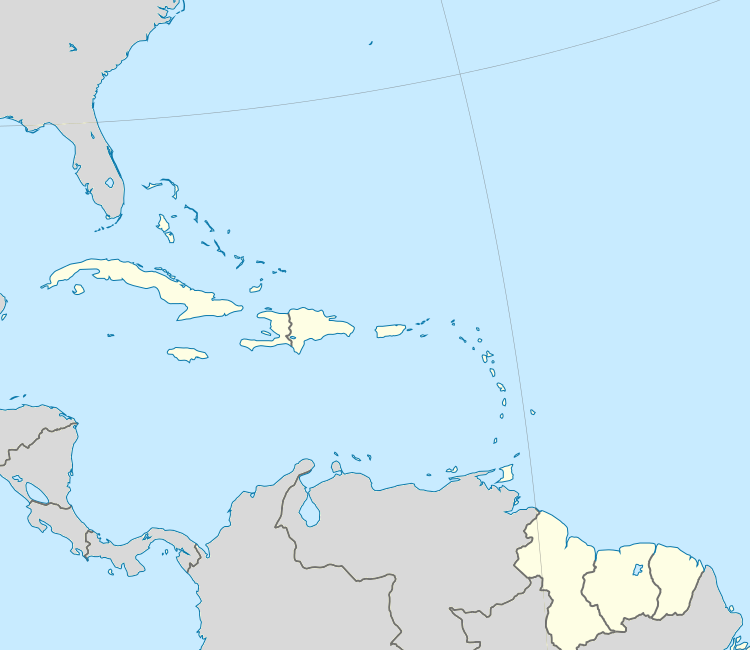
Location of teams of the 2002 CFU Club Championship
(H): Hosts

| Association | Team | Qualification method | App. (last) | Previous best (last) |
|---|---|---|---|---|
| Cayman Islands | George Town | 2001–02 Cayman Islands Premier League champions | 1st | Debut |
| Dominica | Saint Joseph | Replacement team (Note: Saint Joseph replaced Beacon Insurance from Grenada, who withdrew for unknown reasons.) | 1st | Debut |
| Haiti | FICA | 2001 Championnat National champions | 1st | Debut |
| Haiti | Violette | 2001 Championnat National runners-up | 2nd (2000) | Group stage (2000) |
| Jamaica | Arnett Gardens | 2001–02 Jamaica Premier League champions | 1st | Debut |
| Jamaica | Harbour View | Invited | 2nd (2000) | Third place (2000) |
| Saint Lucia | VSADC | 2001 SLFA First Division champions | 1st | Debut |
| Martinique | Club Franciscain | 2001–02 Martinique Championnat National champions | 4th (2001) | Group stage (2000) |
| Martinique | US Robert | 2001–02 Martinique Championnat National runners-up | 1st | Debut |
| Trinidad and Tobago | W Connection | 2001 Professional Football League champions | 3rd (2001) | Champions (2001) |

== First round ==
| Team 1 | Agg. | Team 2 | 1st leg | 2nd leg |
|---|---|---|---|---|
| George Town (Cayman Islands) | 1–10 | (Jamaica) Harbour View | 0–3 | 1–7 |
| US Robert (Martinique) | 6–1 | (Dominica) Saint Joseph | 5–0 | 1–1 |

17 October 2002

| George Town (Cayman Islands) | 0–3 | (Jamaica) Harbour View |
|---|---|---|
| | | Gordon 25', 45'; Hue 54' |

T.E. McField Sports Centre, George Town
27 October 2002

| Harbour View (Jamaica) | 7–1 | (Cayman Islands) George Town |
|---|---|---|
| Hue 22'; Taylor 31', 41', 87'; McCreath 54', 80'; Jackson 90' | | Anderson 39' (pen.) |

Harbour View Stadium, Harbour View

Harbour View won 10–1 on aggregate.

17 October 2002

| US Robert (Martinique) | 5–0 | (Dominica) Saint Joseph |
|---|---|---|
| Paola 20'; Crusol 23'; Muday 25', 86'; Juneau 50' |

Stade Georges Spitz, Le Robert
27 October 2002

| Saint Joseph (Dominica) | 1–1 | (Martinique) US Robert |
|---|---|---|
| Marshall 80' | | Lemare 30' |

Stade Georges Spitz, Le Robert

US Robert won 6–1 on aggregate.

== Second round ==
=== Group A ===
Arnett Gardens advanced to the 2003 CONCACAF Champions' Cup after topping their group.

| Pos | Team | Pld | W | D | L | GF | GA | GD | Pts | Qualification |
|---|---|---|---|---|---|---|---|---|---|---|
| 1 | (Jamaica) Arnett Gardens (H) | 2 | 1 | 1 | 0 | 5 | 0 | +5 | 4 | 2003 CONCACAF Champions' Cup |
| 2 | (Haiti) Violette | 2 | 1 | 1 | 0 | 3 | 1 | +2 | 4 | |
| 3 | (Saint Lucia) VSADC | 2 | 0 | 0 | 2 | 1 | 8 | −7 | 0 | |
| 4 | (Martinique) Club Franciscain | 0 | 0 | 0 | 0 | 0 | 0 | 0 | 0 | Withdrew (Note: Club Franciscain withdrew due to participation in Coupe de France. CONCACAF fined the club $11,000 and suspended it from international competition for one year.) |

Source: CONCACAF
(H) Hosts
4 December 2002

| Arnett Gardens (Jamaica) | 5–0 | (Saint Lucia) VSADC |
|---|---|---|
| Shedden 12', 45'; Chin-Sue 32'; J. Williams 70'; Wilson 80' |

Anthony Spaulding Sports Complex, Kingston

6 December 2002

| Violette (Haiti) | 3–1 | (Saint Lucia) VSADC |
|---|---|---|
| Mancao 7'; Jackson-Joseph 37'; Sampeur 80' | | Price 89' |

Anthony Spaulding Sports Complex, Kingston

8 December 2002

| Arnett Gardens (Jamaica) | 0–0 | (Haiti) Violette |

Anthony Spaulding Sports Complex, Kingston

=== Group B ===
W Connection advanced to the 2003 CONCACAF Champions' Cup after topping their group.

| Pos | Team | Pld | W | D | L | GF | GA | GD | Pts | Qualification |
|---|---|---|---|---|---|---|---|---|---|---|
| 1 | (Trinidad and Tobago) W Connection (H) | 2 | 2 | 0 | 0 | 4 | 1 | +3 | 6 | 2003 CONCACAF Champions' Cup |
| 2 | (Jamaica) Harbour View | 2 | 1 | 0 | 1 | 5 | 3 | +2 | 3 | |
| 3 | (Martinique) US Robert | 2 | 0 | 0 | 2 | 1 | 6 | −5 | 0 | |
| 4 | (Haiti) FICA | 0 | 0 | 0 | 0 | 0 | 0 | 0 | 0 | Withdrew |

Source: CONCACAF
(H) Hosts
11 December 2002

| Harbour View (Jamaica) | 4–1 | (Martinique) US Robert |
|---|---|---|
| Hue 16'; Taylor 52'; Shaw 83'; D. Stewart 88' | | Gibon 9' (pen.) |

Manny Ramjohn Stadium, Marabella

13 December 2002

| W Connection (Trinidad and Tobago) | 2–1 | (Jamaica) Harbour View |
|---|---|---|
| Jean 72'; Elva 76' | | D. Williams 82' |

Manny Ramjohn Stadium, Marabella

15 December 2002

| W Connection (Trinidad and Tobago) | 2–0 | (Martinique) US Robert |
|---|---|---|
| Jean 66'; Elva 84' |

Manny Ramjohn Stadium, Marabella

== Top scorers ==
| | Player | Club | Goals |
|---|---|---|---|
| 1 | (Jamaica) Fabian Taylor | Harbour View | 4 |
| 2 | (Jamaica) Jermaine Hue | Harbour View | 3 |
| 3 | (Jamaica) Jomo Gordon | Harbour View | 2 |
| 3 | (Jamaica) Nicholas McCreath | Harbour View | 2 |
| 3 | (Martinique) Willy Muday | US Robert | 2 |
| 3 | (Jamaica) Denton Shedden | Arnett Gardens | 2 |
| 3 | (Saint Lucia) Earl Jean | W Connection | 2 |
| 3 | (Saint Lucia) Titus Elva | W Connection | 2 |
