= 2000 CFU Club Championship =

Tournament details
- Dates: 30 October – 14 December
- Teams: 14 (from 10 associations)

Final positions
- Champions: (Trinidad and Tobago) Joe Public (2nd title)
- Runners-up: (Trinidad and Tobago) W Connection
- Third place: (Jamaica) Harbour View
- Fourth place: (Haiti) Carioca

Tournament statistics
- Matches played: 24
- Goals scored: 99 (4.13 per match)
- Top scorer(s): (Brazil) Jose Maria Manoel (W Connection); 7 goals

The 2000 Caribbean Football Union Club Championship was an international club football competition held in the Caribbean to determine the region's qualifiers to the 2000 CONCACAF Champions' Cup.

== History ==
Originally a tournament with eight teams was planned to be held between October 28 and November 5:

- Notre Dame (Barbados, 1999 Barbados Premier League champions)
- Violette (Haiti, 1999 D1 Special Championship champions)
- Tivoli Gardens (Jamaica, 1998–99 Jamaica Premier League champions)
- Club Franciscain (Martinique, 1998–99 Martinique Championnat National champions)
- Defence Force (Trinidad and Tobago, 1999 Professional Football League champions)
- Joe Public (Trinidad and Tobago, title holders)
- W Connection (Trinidad and Tobago, 1999 FA Trophy winners)
- Camdonia Chelsea (Saint Vincent and the Grenadines, 1998–99 NLA Premier League champions)

However, in preparation of a "dramatically enhanced" CONCACAF club competition, the set-up was changed completely. Of the above teams, three teams, Camdonia Chelsea, Notre Dame, and Defence Force, were removed from the competition for unknown reasons. Replacing those teams were Café Sisserou Strikers, Carioca FC, Empire, Harbour View, Harlem Bombers, Paradise, RKVFC Sithoc, Robinhood, and Roots Alley Ballers. With this, four groups were formed; the winners of which progressed to the final championship round.

== Teams ==
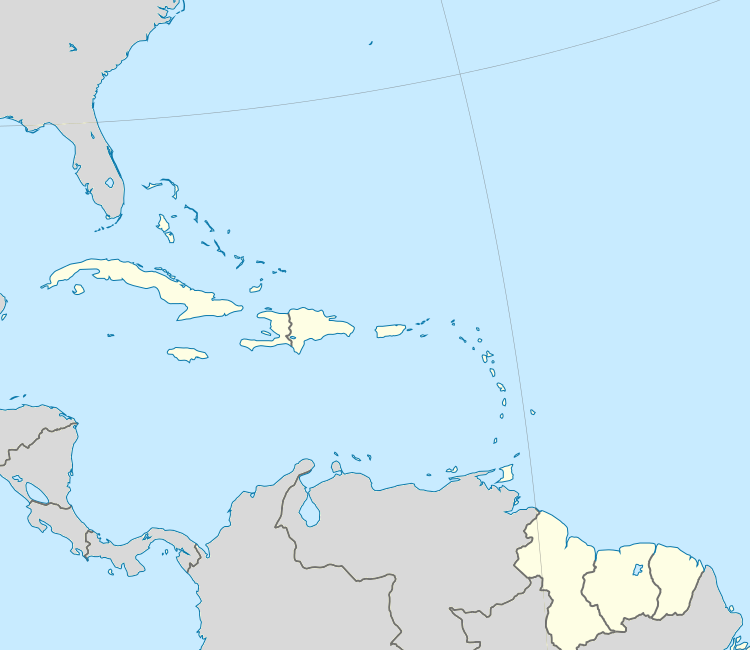
Location of teams of the 2000 CFU Club Championship
(H): Hosts

Association	Team	Qualification method	App. (last)	Previous best (last)
Antigua and Barbuda (H)	Empire	1998–99 Antigua and Barbuda Premier Division champions	1st	Debut
Netherlands Antilles	Sithoc	1998–99 Netherlands Antilles Championship champions	1st	Debut
Barbados	Paradise	1999 Barbados FA Cup winners	1st	Debut
Dominica	Harlem Bombers	1999 Dominica Premier League champions	1st	Debut
Dominica	Café Sisserou Strikers	Invited	1st	Debut
Haiti	Violette	1999 Championnat National champions	1st	Debut
Haiti	Carioca	Invited	1st	Debut
Jamaica (H)	Tivoli Gardens	1998–99 Jamaica Premier League champions	1st	Debut
Jamaica (H)	Harbour View	1998–99 Jamaica Premier League runners-up	1st	Debut
Saint Lucia	Roots Alley Ballers	1999 SLFA First Division champions	1st	Debut
Martinique	Club Franciscain	1999–00 Martinique Championnat National champions	2nd (1997)	Group stage (1997)
Suriname	Robinhood	Invited	1st	Debut
Trinidad and Tobago (H)	Joe Public	Title holders	2nd (1998)	Champions (1998)
Trinidad and Tobago (H)	W Connection	1999 FA Trophy winners	1st	Debut

== First round ==
=== Group A ===
Pos	Team	Pld	W	D	L	GF	GA	GD	Pts	Qualification
1	(Trinidad and Tobago) Joe Public (H)	3	3	0	0	14	0	+14	9	Championship Group
2	(Suriname) Robinhood	3	1	1	1	7	9	−2	4	
3	(Netherlands Antilles) Sithoc	3	0	2	1	4	11	−7	2	
4	(Dominica) Harlem Bombers	3	0	1	2	4	9	−5	1	

Source: CONCACAF
(H) Hosts
1 November 2000

Joe Public (Trinidad and Tobago)	2–0	(Dominica) Harlem Bombers
Jemmott 30'; Narine 65'

Marvin Lee Stadium, Macoya
1 November 2000

Sithoc (Netherlands Antilles)	2–2	(Suriname) Robinhood
Meulena 22'; Margarittha 42'		Bahiadesa 32'; Vlijter 71'

Marvin Lee Stadium, Macoya

3 November 2000

Sithoc (Netherlands Antilles)	2–2	(Dominica) Harlem Bombers
Branthard 69'; Popper 90'		Emmanuel 38'; John 49'

Marvin Lee Stadium, Macoya
3 November 2000

Joe Public (Trinidad and Tobago)	5–0	(Suriname) Robinhood
Eve 18', 45'; Jemmott 44'; Feller 58' (o.g.); Elcock 44'

Marvin Lee Stadium, Macoya

5 November 2000

Robinhood (Suriname)	5–2	(Dominica) Harlem Bombers
Grootfaam 15'; Vlijter 32', 69'; Panka 42', 85'		Greenaway 17'; James 24'

Marvin Lee Stadium, Macoya
5 November 2000

Joe Public (Trinidad and Tobago)	7–0	(Netherlands Antilles) Sithoc
Thomas 31'; Christian 39', 54', 58', 90+2'; Narine 44'; Gray 90'

Marvin Lee Stadium, Macoya

=== Group B ===
Pos	Team	Pld	W	D	L	GF	GA	GD	Pts	Qualification
1	(Jamaica) Harbour View (H)	3	3	0	0	9	0	+9	9	Championship Group
2	(Haiti) Violette	3	2	0	1	9	7	+2	6	
3	(Barbados) Paradise	3	1	0	2	2	3	−1	3	
4	(Saint Lucia) Roots Alley Ballers	3	0	0	3	1	11	−10	0	

Source: CONCACAF
(H) Hosts

=== Matches ===
30 October 2000

Harbour View (Jamaica)	5–0	(Haiti) Violette
Taylor 7'; Miller 15'; Scarlett 16'; Hue 34', 60'

Harbour View Stadium, Harbour View
30 October 2000

Paradise (Barbados)	1–0	(Saint Lucia) Roots Alley Ballers
Brewster 12'

Harbour View Stadium, Harbour View

1 November 2000

Harbour View (Jamaica)	1–0	(Barbados) Paradise
Hue 57'

Harbour View Stadium, Harbour View
1 November 2000

Violette (Haiti)	7–1	(Saint Lucia) Roots Alley Ballers
Jackson 28', 64'; Lespinas 37', 48', 66'; Beauplan 53'; Princime 57'		Jean-Baptiste 40'

Harbour View Stadium, Harbour View

3 November 2000

Harbour View (Jamaica)	3–0	(Saint Lucia) Roots Alley Ballers
Prendergast 5'; Rose 71'; C. Stewart 90'

Harbour View Stadium, Harbour View
3 November 2000

Violette (Haiti)	2–1	(Barbados) Paradise
Jackson 15'; Lespinas 55'; Lovell 75'

Harbour View Stadium, Harbour View

=== Group C ===
Pos	Team	Pld	W	D	L	GF	GA	GD	Pts	Qualification
1	(Trinidad and Tobago) W Connection	3	1	2	0	15	4	+11	5	Championship Group
2	(Antigua and Barbuda) Empire (H)	3	1	2	0	10	4	+6	5	
3	(Jamaica) Tivoli Gardens	3	1	2	0	7	5	+2	5	
4	(Dominica) Café Sisserou Strikers	3	0	0	3	3	22	−19	0	

Source: CONCACAF
(H) Hosts
9 November 2000

Tivoli Gardens (Jamaica)	1–1	(Trinidad and Tobago) W Connection
Green 48'		Carrington 77'

Antigua Recreation Ground, St. John's
9 November 2000

Empire (Antigua and Barbuda)	6–0	(Dominica) Café Sisserou Strikers
Whyte 19', 69', 71'; Richards 53'; Nesbitt 68'; Joseph 87'

Antigua Recreation Ground, St. John's

11 November 2000

W Connection (Trinidad and Tobago)	11–0	(Dominica) Café Sisserou Strikers
Manoel 14', 63', 75', 78', 88'; Elva 79', 80', 81'; Dos Santos 42'; Carrington 85'; Goulart 89'

Antigua Recreation Ground, St. John's
11 November 2000

Empire (Antigua and Barbuda)	1–1	(Jamaica) Tivoli Gardens
Richards 27'		Brown 47'

Antigua Recreation Ground, St. John's

13 November 2000

Empire (Antigua and Barbuda)	3–3	(Trinidad and Tobago) W Connection
Nesbitt 36'; Whyte 45'; Richards 68'		Manoel 45', 66'; Jean 70'

Antigua Recreation Ground, St. John's
13 November 2000

Tivoli Gardens (Jamaica)	5–3	(Dominica) Café Sisserou Strikers
Johnson 57' (pen.); King 61', 83', 90'; Israel 77'		Bertrand 28'; Larocque 35'; Cassimir 50'

Antigua Recreation Ground, St. John's

=== Group D ===
Pos	Team	Pld	W	D	L	GF	GA	GD	Pts	Qualification
1	(Haiti) Carioca	0	0	0	0	0	0	0	0	Championship Group
2	(Dominica) Café Sisserou Strikers	0	0	0	0	0	0	0	0	Moved to Group C
3	(Martinique) Club Franciscain	0	0	0	0	0	0	0	0	Withdrew

Source: CONCACAF

== Championship Group ==
With Joe Public winning the group, they won the title for the second straight year and advanced to the 2000 CONCACAF Champions' Cup.

Pos	Team	Pld	W	D	L	GF	GA	GD	Pts	Qualification
1	(Trinidad and Tobago) Joe Public (H)	3	1	2	0	3	2	+1	5	2000 CONCACAF Champions' Cup
2	(Trinidad and Tobago) W Connection (H)	3	1	1	1	4	3	+1	4	
3	(Jamaica) Harbour View	3	1	1	1	4	5	−1	4	
4	(Haiti) Carioca	3	0	2	1	3	4	−1	2	

Source: CONCACAF
(H) Hosts
29 November 2000

W Connection (Trinidad and Tobago)	3–1	(Jamaica) Harbour View
Goulart 18'; Elva 41'; Jean 46'		Prendergast 10'

Gilbert Park, California
1 December 2000

W Connection (Trinidad and Tobago)	1–1	(Haiti) Carioca
Goulart 68'		Chevalier 60'

Gilbert Park, California
3 December 2000

Carioca (Haiti)	1–2	(Jamaica) Harbour View
Fritzner 35'		Miller 66'; Shaw 72'

Gilbert Park, California

3 December 2000

Joe Public (Trinidad and Tobago)	1–0	(Trinidad and Tobago) W Connection
Pierre 32'

Marvin Lee Stadium, Macoya
5 December 2000

Joe Public (Trinidad and Tobago)	1–1 (Note: Original match was played on November 29, but was abandoned after the 20' minute due to the pitch getting waterlogged.)	(Haiti) Carioca
Trotman 54'		Fritzner 35'

Marvin Lee Stadium, Macoya
14 December 2000

Joe Public (Trinidad and Tobago)	1–1 (Note: Original match was scheduled for December 1, but the pitch was still unplayable. Harbour View had to leave on December 4, so the match was rescheduled for December 14.)	(Jamaica) Harbour View
Eve 47'		Taylor 77'

Marvin Lee Stadium, Macoya

== Top scorers ==
	Player	Club	Goals
1	(Brazil) Jose Maria Manoel	W Connection	7
2	(Antigua and Barbuda) Ranjae Christian	Joe Public	4
2	(Haiti) Ramis Lespinas	Violette	4
2	(Antigua and Barbuda) Conrad Whyte	Empire	4
2	(Saint Lucia) Titus Elva	W Connection	4
3	(Suriname) Ifenildo Vlijter	Robinhood	3
3	(Jamaica) Jermaine Hue	Harbour View	3
3	(Haiti) Peterson Jackson	Violette	3
3	(Antigua and Barbuda) Darren Richards	Empire	3
3	(Brazil) Gefferson Goulart	W Connection	3
3	(Jamaica) David King	Tivoli Gardens	3
