= 2003 CFU Club Championship =

Tournament details
- Dates: 24 September – 28 December
- Teams: 18 (from 9 associations)

Final positions
- Champions: (Trinidad and Tobago) San Juan Jabloteh (1st title)
- Runners-up: (Trinidad and Tobago) W Connection

Tournament statistics
- Matches played: 12
- Goals scored: 38 (3.17 per match)
- Top scorer(s): (Jamaica) Ray Graham (Arnett Gardens); 4 goals

The 2003 Caribbean Football Union Club Championship was an international club football competition held in the Caribbean to determine the region's qualifier for the CONCACAF Champions' Cup. Seven teams from four football associations played in the 2003 edition, contested on a two-legged basis. A round of 16 and a preliminary round were scheduled but never played due to 11 teams withdrawing from the competition.

The Trinidad and Tobago Professional Football League had the edge over the Jamaica National Premier League in the semifinals, winning both ties to set up an all-T&T final. San Juan Jabloteh finally beat W Connection on penalty kicks to advance to the 2004 CONCACAF Champions' Cup.

== Teams ==
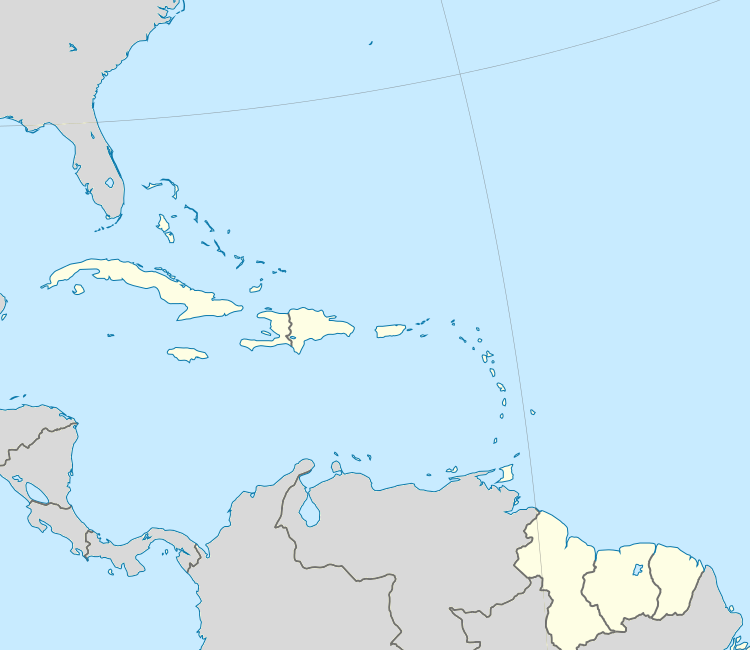
Location of teams of the 2003 CFU Club Championship

Association	Team	Qualification method	App. (last)	Previous best (last)
Netherlands Antilles	Barber	2002–03 Netherlands Antilles Championship winners	1st	Debut
Netherlands Antilles	Jong Colombia	2002–03 Netherlands Antilles Championship runners-up	2nd (2001)	Second round (2001)
Netherlands Antilles	SUBT	Invited	1st	Debut
Barbados	Paradise	2003 Barbados Premier League champions	2nd (2000)	First round (2000)
Barbados	Barbados Defence Force	2003 Barbados Premier League runners-up	1st	Debut
Dominica	Harlem United	2003 Dominica Premier League champions	2nd (2000)	First round (2000)
Dominica	Pointe Michel	Invited	1st	Debut
Grenada	Queens Park Rangers	2002 GFA Premier League champions	1st	Debut
Grenada	Fontenoy United	Invited	1st	Debut
Jamaica	Portmore United	2002–03 Jamaica Premier League champions	1st	Debut
Jamaica	Arnett Gardens	2002–03 Jamaica Premier League runners-up	2nd (2002)	Champions (2002)
Saint Kitts and Nevis	Village Superstars	2002–03 SKNFA Premier League champions	1st	Debut
Saint Kitts and Nevis	Newtown United	2002–03 SKNFA Premier League runners-up	1st	Debut
Suriname	Nacional	2002–03 SVB Eerste Divisie champions	1st	Debut
Suriname	Robinhood	2002–03 SVB Eerste Divisie runners-up	2nd (2000)	First round (2000)
Turks and Caicos Islands	Caribbean All Stars	2002–03 Provo Premier League champions	1st	Debut
Trinidad and Tobago	San Juan Jabloteh	2002 TT Premier Football League champions	2nd (1998)	Quarter-finals (1998)
Trinidad and Tobago	W Connection	2002 TT Premier Football League runners-up	4th (2002)	Champions (2002)

== Bracket ==
Preliminary round
(Grenada) ~~Fontenoy United~~	–	–	–
(Saint Kitts and Nevis) ~~Newtown United~~	–	–	–
(Netherlands Antilles) ~~SUBT~~	–	–	–
(Suriname) ~~Robinhood~~	–	–	–

First round
–	–	–	–
(Trinidad and Tobago) San Juan Jabloteh	–	–	w/o
–	–	–	–
(Barbados) ~~Paradise~~	–	–	–
(Turks and Caicos Islands) ~~Caribbean All Stars~~	–	–	–
(Netherlands Antilles) Jong Colombia	–	–	w/o
(Jamaica) Arnett Gardens	–	–	w/o
(Saint Kitts and Nevis) ~~Village Superstars~~	–	–	–
(Dominica) ~~Pointe Michel~~	–	–	–
(Jamaica) Portmore United	–	–	w/o
(Netherlands Antilles) Barber	–	–	w/o
~~Barbados Defence Force~~	–	–	–
(Grenada) ~~Queens Park Rangers~~	–	–	–
(Suriname) Nacional	–	–	w/o
(Trinidad and Tobago) W Connection	–	–	w/o
(Dominica) ~~Harlem United~~	–	–	–

Second round
(Trinidad and Tobago) San Juan Jabloteh	–	–	w/o
–	–	–	–
(Netherlands Antilles) Jong Colombia	1	0	1
(Jamaica) Arnett Gardens	5	8	13
(Jamaica) Portmore United	1	2	3
(Netherlands Antilles) Barber	0	1	1
(Suriname) Nacional	0	2	2
(Trinidad and Tobago) W Connection	3	0	3

Semi-finals
(Trinidad and Tobago) San Juan Jabloteh	3	3	6
(Jamaica) Arnett Gardens	1	1	2
(Jamaica) Portmore United	0	0	0
(Trinidad and Tobago) W Connection	0	1	1

Final
(Trinidad and Tobago) San Juan Jabloteh (p)	2	1	3 (4)
(Trinidad and Tobago) W Connection	1	2	3 (2)

== Matches ==
=== Preliminary round ===
Team 1	Agg.	Team 2	1st leg	2nd leg
SUBT (Netherlands Antilles)	w/o	(Suriname) Robinhood		
Fontenoy United (Grenada)	w/o	(Saint Kitts and Nevis) Newtown United		

=== Matches ===
24 September 2003

SUBT (Netherlands Antilles)	w/o	(Suriname) Robinhood

Stadion dr. Antoine Maduro, Willemstad

Both teams withdrew.

24 September 2003

Fontenoy United (Grenada)	w/o	(Saint Kitts and Nevis) Newtown United

Kirani James Athletic Stadium, St. George's

Both teams withdrew.

=== First round ===
Team 1	Agg.	Team 2	1st leg	2nd leg
	w/o	(Barbados) Paradise		
	w/o	(Trinidad and Tobago) San Juan Jabloteh		
Arnett Gardens (Jamaica)	w/o	(Saint Kitts and Nevis) Village Superstars		
Caribbean All Stars (Turks and Caicos Islands)	w/o	(Netherlands Antilles) Jong Colombia		
Pointe Michel (Dominica)	w/o	(Jamaica) Portmore United		
Barber (Netherlands Antilles)	w/o	Barbados Defence Force		
W Connection (Trinidad and Tobago)	w/o	(Dominica) Harlem United		
Queens Park Rangers (Grenada)	w/o	(Suriname) Nacional		

=== Matches ===
15 October 2003

w/o	(Barbados) Paradise

Paradise withdrew.

15 October 2003

w/o	(Trinidad and Tobago) San Juan Jabloteh

Both teams withdrew, San Juan Jabloteh advances.

15 October 2003

Arnett Gardens (Jamaica)	w/o	(Saint Kitts and Nevis) Village Superstars

Anthony Spaulding Sports Complex, Kingston

Village Superstars withdrew, Arnett Gardens advances.

15 October 2003

Caribbean All Stars (Turks and Caicos Islands)	w/o	(Netherlands Antilles) Jong Colombia

Caribbean All Stars withdrew, Jong Colombia advances.

15 October 2003

Pointe Michel (Dominica)	w/o	(Jamaica) Portmore United

Pointe Michel Field, Pointe Michel

Pointe Michel withdrew, Portmore United advances.

15 October 2003

Barber (Netherlands Antilles)	w/o	Barbados Defence Force

Ergilio Hato Stadium, Willemstad

Barbados Defence Force withdrew, Barber advances.

15 October 2003

W Connection (Trinidad and Tobago)	w/o	(Dominica) Harlem United

Manny Ramjohn Stadium, Marabella

Harlem United withdrew, W Connection advances.

15 October 2003

Queens Park Rangers (Grenada)	w/o	(Suriname) Nacional

Cutbert Peters Park, Gouyave

Queens Park Rangers withdrew, Nacional advances.

=== Second round ===
Team 1	Agg.	Team 2	1st leg	2nd leg
	w/o	(Trinidad and Tobago) San Juan Jabloteh		
Jong Colombia (Netherlands Antilles)	1–13	(Jamaica) Arnett Gardens	1–5	0–8
Portmore United (Jamaica)	3–1	(Netherlands Antilles) Barber	1–0	2–1
Nacional (Suriname)	2–3	(Trinidad and Tobago) W Connection	0–3	2–0

=== Matches ===
5 November 2003

w/o	(Trinidad and Tobago) San Juan Jabloteh

Paradise withdrew, San Juan Jabloteh advances.

5 November 2003

Jong Colombia (Netherlands Antilles)	1–5	(Jamaica) Arnett Gardens
Jenson 73'		Graham 17', 42', 57'; Strickland 83'; Dunn 90'

Ergilio Hato Stadium, Willemstad
12 November 2003

Arnett Gardens (Jamaica)	8–0	(Netherlands Antilles) Jong Colombia
Graham 10'; Bootha 32'; Williams 36', 62'; McLeod 76'; Bunsie 84' (pen.); Blackburn 87'

Anthony Spaulding Sports Complex, Kingston

Arnett Gardens won 13–1 on aggregate.

5 November 2003

Portmore United (Jamaica)	1–0	(Netherlands Antilles) Barber
McDonald 12'

Ferdi Neita Sports Complex, Portmore
12 November 2003

Barber (Netherlands Antilles)	1–2	(Jamaica) Portmore United
Escoria 66'		Nelson 27', 59'

Ergilio Hato Stadium, Willemstad

Portmore United won 3–1 on aggregate.

5 November 2003

Nacional (Suriname)	0–3	(Trinidad and Tobago) W Connection
		Davis 55'; Elva 79'; Goulart 81'

Nacionello Stadion, Houttuin
12 November 2003

W Connection (Trinidad and Tobago)	0–2	(Suriname) Nacional
		Laswyk 63'; Leao 86'

Manny Ramjohn Stadium, Marabella

W Connection won 3–2 on aggregate.

=== Semi-finals ===
Team 1	Agg.	Team 2	1st leg	2nd leg
San Juan Jabloteh (Trinidad and Tobago)	6–2	(Jamaica) Arnett Gardens	3–1	3–1
Portmore United (Jamaica)	0–1	(Trinidad and Tobago) W Connection	0–0	0–1

=== Matches ===
26 November 2003

San Juan Jabloteh (Trinidad and Tobago)	3–1	(Jamaica) Arnett Gardens
Whitley 21', 40' (pen.); Glen 50'		Bootha 67'

Hasely Crawford Stadium, Port of Spain
3 December 2003

Arnett Gardens (Jamaica)	1–3	(Trinidad and Tobago) San Juan Jabloteh
Sheddon 43'		Baptiste 38'; Noel 46'; Pierre 67'

Anthony Spaulding Sports Complex, Kingston

San Juan Jabloteh won 6–2 on aggregate.

26 November 2003

Portmore United (Jamaica)	0–0	(Trinidad and Tobago) W Connection

Manny Ramjohn Stadium, Marabella
3 December 2003

W Connection (Trinidad and Tobago)	1–0	(Jamaica) Portmore United
Davis 34'

Manny Ramjohn Stadium, Marabella

W Connection won 1–0 on aggregate.

=== Final ===
San Juan Jabloteh were crowned champions and advanced to the 2004 CONCACAF Champions' Cup.

Team 1	Agg.	Team 2	1st leg	2nd leg
W Connection (Trinidad and Tobago)	3–3 (2–4 p)	(Trinidad and Tobago) San Juan Jabloteh	1–2	2–1

=== Matches ===
17 December 2003

W Connection (Trinidad and Tobago)	1–2	(Trinidad and Tobago) San Juan Jabloteh
Goulart 40'		Eve 19', 41'

Manny Ramjohn Stadium, Marabella
28 December 2003

San Juan Jabloteh (Trinidad and Tobago)	1–2	(Trinidad and Tobago) W Connection
Glen 41'		Goulart 24'; Jemmott 51'
Penalties
	4–2

Hasely Crawford Stadium, Port of Spain

3–3 on aggregate. San Juan Jabloteh won 4–2 on penalties.

== Top scorers ==
	Player	Club	Goals
1	(Jamaica) Ray Graham	Arnett Gardens	4
2	(Brazil) Gefferson Goulart	W Connection	3
3	(Trinidad and Tobago) Angus Eve	San Juan Jabloteh	2
3	(Trinidad and Tobago) Cornell Glen	San Juan Jabloteh	2
3	(Trinidad and Tobago) Aurtis Whitley	San Juan Jabloteh	2
3	(Trinidad and Tobago) Kendall Davis	W Connection	2
3	(Jamaica) Roen Nelson	Portmore United	2
3	(Jamaica) Jonathon Williams	Arnett Gardens	2
3	(Jamaica) Garth Bootha	Arnett Gardens	2
