= 2001 CFU Club Championship =

Tournament details
- Dates: 29 July – 11 October
- Teams: 16 (from 11 associations)

Final positions
- Champions: (Trinidad and Tobago) Defence Force and W Connection (1st title)

Tournament statistics
- Matches played: 12
- Goals scored: 58 (4.83 per match)
- Top scorer(s): (Trinidad and Tobago) Jason Scotland (Defence Force) (Trinidad and Tobago) Brent Hudson (Defence Force); 5 goals

The 2001 CFU Club Championship was an international club football competition held in the Caribbean to determine the region's qualifiers to the CONCACAF Champions' Cup. Group winners Defence Force and W Connection of Trinidad and Tobago advanced to the 2002 CONCACAF Champions' Cup.

== Teams ==
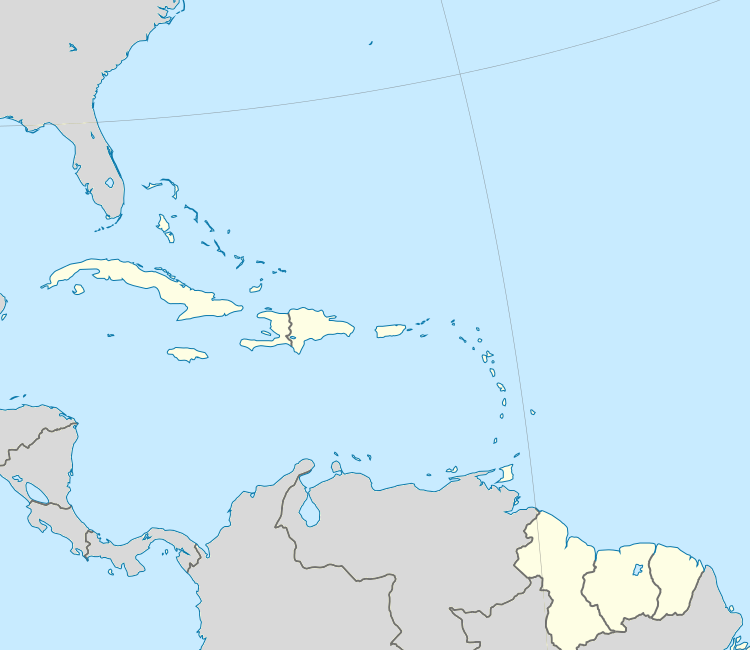
Location of teams of the 2001 CFU Club Championship
(H): Hosts

Association	Team	Qualification method	App. (last)	Previous best (last)
Antigua and Barbuda	Empire	1999–00 Antigua and Barbuda Premier Division champions	2nd (2000)	Group stage (2000)
Netherlands Antilles	Jong Colombia	2000–01 Netherlands Antilles Championship winners	1st	Debut
Netherlands Antilles	Juventus	2000–01 Netherlands Antilles Championship runners-up	1st	Debut
Guyana	Fruta Conquerors	2000–01 GFF National Super League champions	1st	Debut
Haiti (H)	Racing Haïtien	2000 Championnat National champions	1st	Debut
Haiti (H)	Roulado	2000 Championnat National runners-up	1st	Debut
Saint Lucia	Roots Alley Ballers	2000 SLFA First Division champions	2nd (2000)	Group stage (2000)
Saint Lucia	Rovers United	2000 Saint Lucia FA Cup winners	1st	Debut
Martinique	Club Franciscain	2000–01 Martinique Championnat National champions	3rd (2000)	Group stage (2000)
Saint Kitts and Nevis	Garden Hotspurs	2000–01 SKNFA Premier League champions	1st	Debut
Suriname	Transvaal	1999–00 SVB Eerste Divisie champions	2nd (1997)	Group stage (1997)
Suriname	SNL	1999–00 SVB Eerste Divisie runners-up	1st	Debut
Trinidad and Tobago (H)	W Connection	2000 Professional Football League champions	2nd (2000)	Runners-up (2000)
Trinidad and Tobago (H)	Defence Force	2000 Professional Football League runners-up	1st	Debut
British Virgin Islands	HBA Panthers	2000 Tortola League champions	1st	Debut
U.S. Virgin Islands	UWS Upsetters	1999–00 USVISF Premier League champions	1st	Debut

== First round ==
Team 1	Agg.	Team 2	1st leg	2nd leg
Fruta Conquerors (Guyana)	2–9	(Trinidad and Tobago) W Connection	2–1	0–8
Rovers United (Saint Lucia)	1–9	(Trinidad and Tobago) Defence Force	0–3	1–6
Juventus (Netherlands Antilles)	2–10	(Suriname) SNL	1–3	1–7
Racing Haïtien (Haiti)	w/o	(United States Virgin Islands) UWS Upsetters		
Roulado (Haiti)	w/o	(Martinique) Club Franciscain		
Jong Colombia (Netherlands Antilles)	w/o	(Saint Lucia) Roots Alley Ballers		
Transvaal (Suriname)	w/o	(British Virgin Islands) HBA Panthers		
Empire (Antigua and Barbuda)	w/o	(Saint Kitts and Nevis) Garden Hotspurs		

=== Matches ===
29 July 2001

Fruta Conquerors (Guyana)	2–1	(Trinidad and Tobago) W Connection
Hernandez 45'; Grimes 48'		Goulart 65'

Georgetown Football Stadium, Georgetown
5 August 2001

W Connection (Trinidad and Tobago)	8–0	(Guyana) Fruta Conquerors
Carrington 2'; Goulart 19'; Manoel 20'; Joseph 30'; Elva 65', 78', 80'; Sato 88'

Manny Ramjohn Stadium, Marabella

W Connection won 9–2 on aggregate.

29 July 2001

Rovers United (Saint Lucia)	0–3	(Trinidad and Tobago) Defence Force
		Scotland 40', 52'; Fermin 74'

Mindoo Phillip Park, Castries
5 August 2001

Defence Force (Trinidad and Tobago)	6–1	(Saint Lucia) Rovers United
Hudson 12', 22', 73'; Gomez 69', 78'; Goodrich 75'		Mathurin 31'

Hasely Crawford Stadium, Port of Spain

Defence Force won 9–1 on aggregate.

5 August 2001

Juventus (Netherlands Antilles)	1–3	(Suriname) SNL
Martijns 87'		Sandvliet 28'; Zebeda 29', 80'

Municipal Stadium, Kralendijk
12 August 2001

SNL (Suriname)	7–1	(Netherlands Antilles) Juventus
Grootfaam 6', 26', 45+1'; Feller 21', 42' (pen.); Zebeda 63'; Watson 74'		Martijns 38' (pen.)

Dr. Ir. Franklin Essed Stadion, Paramaribo

SNL won 10–2 on aggregate.

29 July 2001

Racing Haïtien (Haiti)	w/o	(United States Virgin Islands) UWS Upsetters

Stade Sylvio Cator, Port-au-Prince

UWS Upsetters withdrew, Racing Haïtien advances.

29 July 2001

Roulado (Haiti)	w/o	(Martinique) Club Franciscain

Parc Savil Dessaint, Gonâve Island

Club Franciscain withdrew, Roulado advances.

29 July 2001

Jong Colombia (Netherlands Antilles)	w/o	(Saint Lucia) Roots Alley Ballers

Ergilio Hato Stadium, Willemstad

Roots Alley Ballers withdrew, Jong Colombia advances.

29 July 2001

Transvaal (Suriname)	w/o	(British Virgin Islands) HBA Panthers

André Kamperveen Stadion, Paramaribo

HBA Panthers withdrew, Transvaal advances.

29 July 2001

Empire (Antigua and Barbuda)	w/o	(Saint Kitts and Nevis) Garden Hotspurs

Antigua Recreation Ground, St. John's

Empire withdrew, Garden Hotspurs advances.

== Second round ==
=== Group A ===
With W Connection topping the group, they advanced to the third round.

Pos	Team	Pld	W	D	L	GF	GA	GD	Pts	Qualification
1	(Trinidad and Tobago) W Connection	2	2	0	0	7	1	+6	6	Third round
2	(Haiti) Racing Haïtien (H)	2	1	0	1	7	4	+3	3	
3	(Netherlands Antilles) Jong Colombia	2	0	0	2	1	10	−9	0	
4	(Suriname) Transvaal	0	0	0	0	0	0	0	0	Withdrew

Source: CONCACAF
(H) Hosts
7 September 2001

W Connection (Trinidad and Tobago)	3–1	(Netherlands Antilles) Jong Colombia
Sato 24'; Manoel 59', 71'		?

Stade Sylvio Cator, Port-au-Prince

9 September 2001

Racing Haïtien (Haiti)	7–0	(Netherlands Antilles) Jong Colombia
St. Lot 4' (pen.), 36', 39'; Elie 18', 74'; Telusma 16', 90'

Stade Sylvio Cator, Port-au-Prince

11 October 2001

Racing Haïtien (Haiti)	0–4 (Note: The original match on September 11 was abandoned at 2–0 in the 45th minute due to rain. As W Connection returned to Trinidad and Tobago, no replay was fixed until a month later in Martinique.)	(Trinidad and Tobago) W Connection
		Jean 30'; A. Charles 42', 75'; Elva 85'

Complexe Sportif de Trianon, Fort-de-France

=== Group B ===
With Defence Force topping the group, they advanced to the third round.

Pos	Team	Pld	W	D	L	GF	GA	GD	Pts	Qualification
1	(Trinidad and Tobago) Defence Force (H)	2	2	0	0	8	2	+6	6	Third round
2	(Suriname) SNL	2	0	1	1	1	3	−2	1	
3	(Haiti) Roulado	2	0	1	1	1	5	−4	1	
4	(Saint Kitts and Nevis) Garden Hotspurs	0	0	0	0	0	0	0	0	Withdrew

Source: CONCACAF
(H) Hosts
24 August 2001

SNL (Suriname)	0–0	(Haiti) Roulado

Larry Gomes Stadium, Arima

26 August 2001

Defence Force (Trinidad and Tobago)	5–1	(Haiti) Roulado
Hudson 31'; Scotland 39', 66'; Phillip 78', 84'		Badio 74'

Larry Gomes Stadium, Arima

28 August 2001

Defence Force (Trinidad and Tobago)	3–1	(Suriname) SNL
Scotland 26'; Hudson 56'; Phillip 78'		Pierre 7' (o.g.)

Larry Gomes Stadium, Arima

== Third round ==
14 October 2001

Defence Force (Trinidad and Tobago)	Not held (Note: On October 10, CONCACAF cancelled the 2001 CONCACAF Champions' Cup. All the teams already qualified were included in the 2002 iteration, with a few additions. Due to this, both Trinidad and Tobago teams were declared joint champions and advanced to the tournament.)	(Trinidad and Tobago) W Connection

== Top scorers ==
	Player	Club	Goals
1	(Trinidad and Tobago) Jason Scotland	Defence Force	5
1	(Trinidad and Tobago) Brent Hudson	Defence Force	5
3	(Saint Lucia) Titus Elva	W Connection	4
4	(Brazil) Jose Maria Manoel	W Connection	3
4	(Suriname) Roberto Zebeda	SNL	3
4	(Suriname) Orlando Grootfaam	SNL	3
4	(Haiti) Jimmy St. Lot	Racing Haïtien	3
4	(Trinidad and Tobago) Sherman Phillip	Defence Force	3
