= Stubborn Youth SC =

Stubborn Youth
- Full name: Stubborn Youth Soccer Club
- Ground: Stubbs Playing Field, Stubbs, Saint Vincent and the Grenadines
- Capacity: 1,000
- League: SVGFF South East Division

Stubborn Youth Soccer Club is an association football club from Stubbs, St. Vincent and the Grenadines currently playing in the SVGFF South East Division, one of twelve regional leagues in the country. The team previously played in the NLA Premier League having qualified for the CFU Club Championship in 1997.

== History ==
Founded in Stubbs, Stubborn Youth play their home games on the Stubbs Playing Field to a capacity of 1,000. A sporting ground usually used for cricket matches. In 1997 Stubborn Youth SC qualified for the CFU Club Championship after finishing as runners-up of their domestic league. In their first International tournament, facing off with SV Transvaal (Suriname), Seba United (Jamaica) and Club Franciscain (Martinique) the club lost all of their matches in the group stage making an early exit from the competition.

In 2000 the club won the South East Regional Championship in St. Vincent and the Grenadines.

== Achievements ==
- South East Regional Championship: 1

2000

== Performance in CONCACAF competitions ==
Results list Stubborn Youth SC's goal tally first.

Win Draw Loss Fixture

Competition	Round	Club	Score
1997 CFU Club Championship	Group Stage	(Suriname) Transvaal	0–1
1997 CFU Club Championship	Group Stage	(Jamaica) Seba United	1–5
1997 CFU Club Championship	Group Stage	(Martinique) Club Franciscain	2–3
