= Jermaine Hue =

Jamaican footballer (born 1978)

Personal information
- Full name: Jermaine Christopher Hue
- Date of birth: 15 June 1978 (age 48)
- Place of birth: Morant Bay, St Thomas, Jamaica
- Height: 5 ft 8 in (1.73 m)
- Position: Midfielder

Team information
- Current team: Harbour View
- Number: 51

Youth career
- Port Morant All Star

Senior career*
| Years | Team | Apps | (Gls) |
| 1994–2005 | Harbour View | 104 | (23) |
| 2005–2006 | Kansas City Wizards | 5 | (0) |
| 2006 | Mjällby | 9 | (1) |
| 2007–2015 | Harbour View | 78 | (10) |
| 2020 | KidSuper Samba AC | 3 | (0) |

International career^{‡}
| 2000–2013 | Jamaica | 42 | (12) |
- * Club domestic league appearances and goals as of 12 November 2020 ‡ National team caps and goals as of 8 July 2013

Jermaine "Jerry" Hue (born 15 June 1978) is a retired professional football midfielder who formerly played for Harbour View and the Jamaica national football team.

== Club career ==
Hue started his playing career for Jamaica National Premier League Harbour View, with whom he won the 2004–2005 National Premier League Championship. He joined Harbour View's U-14 in 1993, before making his first team debut in 1998. He was also the 1999–2000 Premier League MVP.

Jermaine also played for Mandela United of the B.I.S.L. (New York a league from which came Stern John and others who went on to play Major league soccer) where he was spotted by major league scouts.

Next up was a move to the Kansas City Wizards of the American Major League Soccer in September 2005, where he spent one season before moving onto Mjällby of Sweden in 2006. He only played 9 games for them in 2006 before returning to Jamaica.

On 26 September 2013, Jermaine Hue was banned for nine months after testing positive for a banned substance at the World Cup qualifier away to Honduras in June.

== International career ==
Hue made his debut with the Reggae Boyz, the Jamaica national team, in 1999. He scored goals against Guatemala and South Africa at the 2005 CONCACAF Gold Cup.

== Career statistics ==
=== International ===
Scores and results list Jamaica's goal tally first, score column indicates score after each Hue goal.

List of international goals scored by Jermaine Hue
| No. | Date | Venue | Opponent | Score | Result | Competition |
|---|---|---|---|---|---|---|
| 1 | 27 August 2000 | Truman Bodden Sports Complex, George Town, Cayman Islands | Cayman Islands | 1–0 | 6–0 | Friendly |
| 2 | 2 October 2004 | Lockhart Stadium, Fort Lauderdale, United States | Guatemala | 1–2 | 2–2 | Friendly |
| 3 | 2 October 2004 | Lockhart Stadium, Fort Lauderdale, United States | Guatemala | 2–2 | 2–2 | Friendly |
| 4 | 24 November 2003 | Independence Park, Kingston, Jamaica | Saint Martin | 2–0 | 12–0 | 2005 Caribbean Cup qualification |
| 5 | 26 November 2004 | Jarrett Park, Montego Bay, Jamaica | U.S. Virgin Islands | 4–0 | 11–1 | 2005 Caribbean Cup qualification |
| 6 | 26 November 2004 | Jarrett Park, Montego Bay, Jamaica | U.S. Virgin Islands | 6–0 | 11–1 | 2005 Caribbean Cup qualification |
| 7 | 26 November 2004 | Jarrett Park, Montego Bay, Jamaica | U.S. Virgin Islands | 7–0 | 11–1 | 2005 Caribbean Cup qualification |
| 8 | 19 December 2004 | Independence Park, Kingston, Jamaica | Saint Lucia | 2–1 | 2–1 | 2005 Caribbean Cup qualification |
| 9 | 8 January 2005 | Independence Park, Kingston, Jamaica | French Guiana | 1–0 | 5–0 | 2005 Caribbean Cup qualification |
| 10 | 8 July 2005 | Home Depot Center, Carson, United States | Guatemala | 4–2 | 4–3 | 2005 CONCACAF Gold Cup |
| 11 | 10 July 2005 | Los Angeles Memorial Coliseum, Los Angeles, United States | South Africa | 1–1 | 3–3 | 2005 CONCACAF Gold Cup |
| 12 | 15 November 2006 | Independence Park, Kingston, Jamaica | Peru | 1–1 | 1–1 | Friendly |

== Honors ==
=== Harbour View ===
- Jamaica National Premier League:
  - Winner (3): 2000, 2007, 2010
- JFF Champions Cup:
  - Winner (2): 2001, 2002
  - Runner-up (2): 2003, 2005
- CFU Club Championship:
  - Winner (2): 2004, 2007

=== Jamaica ===
- Caribbean Cup:
  - Winner (1): 2005
