= Cornel Chin-Sue =

Jamaican footballer (born 1976)

Personal information
- Full name: Cornel Chin-Sue
- Date of birth: 17 September 1976 (age 50)
- Place of birth: Spanish Town, Jamaica
- Height: 5 ft 8 in (1.73 m)
- Position: Defensive midfielder

Senior career*
Years	Team	Apps	(Gls)
1994–2015	Arnett Gardens		

International career^{‡}
1999–2004	Jamaica	13	(1)
- * Club domestic league appearances and goals as of 15 January 2007 ‡ National team caps and goals as of 15 January 2007

Cornel Chin-Sue (born 17 September 1976) is a former Jamaican football midfielder who played for Arnett Gardens F.C.

== Club career ==
Nicknamed Chaps, he was a member of the locally famous 'Gang of Five', with Kevin Wilson, Everton Bunsie, Kwame Richardson and Eugene Barnes being the others. Chin-Sue is known to be a good tackler and man marker. He has skippered the Arnett team for several years.

== International career ==
He made his debut for the Reggae Boyz in 1999 against Bolivia and played his last in 2004 against Guatemala, collecting a total of 13 caps, scoring one goal. He was part of Jamaica's 2003 CONCACAF Gold Cup squad but did not play in any of their games.
