= Reynold Carrington =

Trinidadian footballer (born 1970)

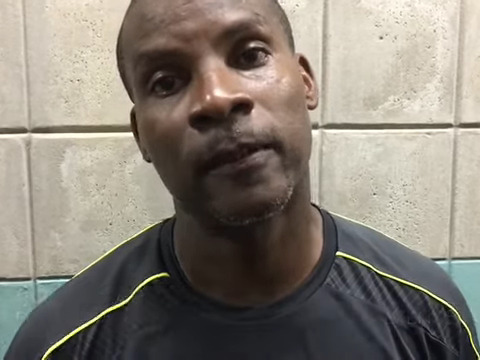
- Carrington in 2017

Personal information
- Date of birth: 27 January 1970 (age 56)
- Place of birth: Point Fortin, Trinidad and Tobago
- Height: 1.75 m (5 ft 9 in)
- Positions: Midfielder; sweeper

Team information
- Current team: Point Fortin Civic (Head coach)

Senior career*
Years	Team	Apps	(Gls)
1989–1995	Defence Force		
1996	New York Fever	19	(3)
1997–1998	Mitra Surabaya		
1999	Point Fortin Civic		
1999–2005	W Connection		

International career
1992–2003	Trinidad and Tobago	41	(2)

Managerial career
- 2003: W Connection
- 2007–2008: Trinidad and Tobago U15
- 2012: Trinidad and Tobago U17
- 2012–2015: Point Fortin Civic
- 2017–2018: Point Fortin Civic
- * Club domestic league appearances and goals

Reynold Carrington (born 27 January 1970) is a former Trinbagonian international footballer and the current football manager for Point Fortin Civic. He played as deep-lying midfield playmaker or as a sweeper.

== Playing career ==
Carrington enjoyed most of his career at Trinidad and Tobago, with brief spells at the United States and Indonesia. He returned to Trinidad & Tobago in 1999 to play for his hometown club Point Fortin Civic and was sold in the same year to newcomers W Connection with Wesley Webb and David Atiba Charles for TT$75,000. In 2000, he won the Player of the Year award for W Connection, TT Pro League and TTFA.

He was named in the team for the 2001 Caribbean Cup, winning the title and scoring in the first match against Barbados and the 2002 CONCACAF Gold Cup. He made his international debut for Trinidad and Tobago in 1992, playing his last match for the Soca Warrions in 2003.

== Coaching career ==
Carrington's first coaching experience was in 2003 as a player-manager for W Connection after team manager Stuart Charles-Fevrier was in charge of the national team. He was named assistant manager after retirement.

He was put in charge of the Trinidad and Tobago national under-15 football team in 2007, also coaching the under-17 team later. In 2012, he took charge of his native city club Point Fortin Civic, leaving the club in early 2015 claiming lack of motivation of his players.

== Personal life ==
He is the father of Khadeen Carrington, who played college basketball for the Seton Hall Pirates and now professionally in Israel. He is also the stepfather of footballer Kariym Balthazar, whom he coached and Point Fortin Civic.

== Career statistics ==
#	Date	Venue	Opponent	Score	Result	Competition
1	3 September 2000	Queen's Park Oval, Port of Spain	Canada	2–0	4–0	2002 FIFA World Cup qualification – CONCACAF semi-finals
2	15 May 2001	Larry Gomes Stadium, Malabar	Barbados	4–0	5–0	2001 Caribbean Cup

== Honours ==
Defence Force

- National League: 1989, 1990, 1992, 1993, 1995

W Connection

- TT Pro League: 2000, 2001, 2005; runner-up 2002, 2003–04

Trinidad and Tobago

- Caribbean Cup: 2001
