= Everton Bunsie =

Jamaican footballer (born 1977)

Everton Bunsie (born 18 April 1977) is a Jamaican football midfielder who currently plays for Arnett Gardens F.C.

== Club career ==
Bunsie was one of the locally famous 'Gang of Five', the others being Kevin Wilson, Cornel Chin-Sue, Kwame Richardson and Eugene Barnes.

== International career ==
Bunsie made 4 appearances for Jamaica national football team.
