= Fabian Taylor =

Jamaican footballer (born 1980)

Personal information
- Full name: Fabian Lamark Taylor
- Date of birth: 13 April 1980 (age 46)
- Place of birth: Kingston, Jamaica
- Height: 5 ft 10 in (1.78 m)
- Position: Striker

Team information
- Current team: Harbour View FC
- Number: 10

Youth career
- Newland F.C.
- Central Link

Senior career*
Years	Team	Apps	(Gls)
1999–2004	Harbour View	123	(63)
2004	→ MetroStars (loan)	21	(5)
2004–2008	Harbour View	76	(39)
2008–2010	Notodden FK	28	(14)
2011–2013	Harbour View	21	(4)

International career^{‡}
2000–2007	Jamaica	39	(7)

Managerial career
- 2019–: Harbour View
- * Club domestic league appearances and goals as of 1 January 2009 ‡ National team caps and goals as of 22 August 2008

Fabian Taylor (born 13 April 1980) is a former Jamaican soccer player, who formerly played as a striker for his last club, Harbour View.

== Club career ==
=== Harbour View ===
Nicknamed Koji, Taylor began his Jamaica National Premier League career at Harbour View FC in 1999. He emerged as one of the top players in Jamaica, leading the league with 19 goals in a single season. After five years, he left the club and spent 2004 on loan with the MetroStars of Major League Soccer.

=== MetroStars ===
In his season with the MetroStars, Taylor had trouble finding playing time in a crowded front line; although he exhibited his scoring prowess very early in the season, he faded as the year passed, ending the season with only five goals and one assist in 21 games played, only eight of which he started.

=== Harbour View ===
Back at Harbour View, he was scoring goals again, finishing 2006–07 season as third in the goalscoring charts with 15 goals.

=== Notodden ===
In March 2008, he signed a three-year contract with Norwegian club Notodden FK. He missed half of the 2009 Adeccoligaen season with a broken leg. Unfortunately the club was relegated at the end of the 2010 season. Taylor once again experience injury issues for Notodden FK in 2010, while the club finish second in the domestic league and failed to earn promotion to the Adeccoligaen for 2011.

=== Harbour View ===
In February 2011, Taylor made his return to Harbour View against Boys Town FC.

== International career ==
Taylor has been an important role player for the Jamaica national team, playing 39 games and scoring 7 goals since debuting with the team in 1999.

=== International goals ===
Scores and results list Jamaica's goal tally first.

No	Date	Venue	Opponent	Score	Result	Competition
1.	19 May 2001	Hasely Crawford Stadium, Port of Spain, Trinidad and Tobago	Barbados	2–0	2–1	2001 Caribbean Cup
2.	2 August 2002	Grenada National Stadium, St. George's, Grenada	Grenada	1–0	1–0	Friendly
3.	11 August 2002	George Odlum Stadium, Vieux Fort, Saint Lucia	Saint Lucia	2–1	3–1	Friendly
4.	31 October 2002	Estadio Mateo Flores, Guatemala City, Guatemala	Guatemala	1–1	1–1	Friendly
5.	23 March 2003	Independence Jamaica, Kingston, Jamaica	Barbados	1–0	2–1	Friendly
6.	26 March 2003	Independence Stadium, Kingston, Jamaica	Saint Lucia	2–0	5–0	2003 CONCACAF Gold Cup qualification
7.	2 July 2007	Azadi Stadium, Tehran, Iran	Iran	1–6	1–8	Friendly

== Management ==
In January 2019, Taylor was named head coach at Harbour View F.C.
