= Harbour View Stadium =

Football stadium in Jamaica

Coordinates: 17°57′23″N 76°43′2″W

- Interactive map of Harbour View Stadium
- Full name: Harbour View Stadium
- Location: Harbour View, Jamaica
- Capacity: 7,000

Construction
- Opened: 1991

Tenant
- Harbour View (JPL) 1991-present

Harbour View Stadium is a football stadium in Harbour View, near Kingston, Jamaica. It was built by Carvel Stewart and Harbour View Football Club in the 1990s, as a part of the club's effort to transform into a truly professional organization. It is the home stadium for the Harbour View Football Club, and has a capacity of 7,000 spectators.

The national team has played several international games at this stadium, as well as the club when they compete in the CFU club championships and the CONCACAF club championships. One highlight was the 2005 CONCACAF Champion's cup home game, which was televised to the world from the Harbour View Stadium on Fox Soccer Channel.

The stadium has two bars and a Western Union outlet, and the field is almost completely surrounded by billboards. This provides revenue for the upkeep of the grounds.
