= 1998 CFU Club Championship =

Tournament details
- Dates: 20 November – 28 November
- Teams: 8 (from 6 associations)

Final positions
- Champions: (Trinidad and Tobago) Joe Public (1st title)
- Runners-up: (Trinidad and Tobago) Caledonia AIA

Tournament statistics
- Matches played: 7
- Goals scored: 35 (5 per match)
- Top scorer(s): (Trinidad and Tobago) Angus Eve (Joe Public); 1 goal

The 1998 Caribbean Football Union Club Championship was an international club football competition held in the Caribbean to determine the region's qualifiers to the CONCACAF Champions' Cup. The winners Joe Public F.C. advanced to CONCACAF Champions' Cup 1999.

The champions of Guyana and Cayman Islands could not participate in the competition, so CONCACAF, presided by Jack Warner of Trinidad and Tobago, decided to invite two additional teams from Trinidad and Tobago.

== Teams ==
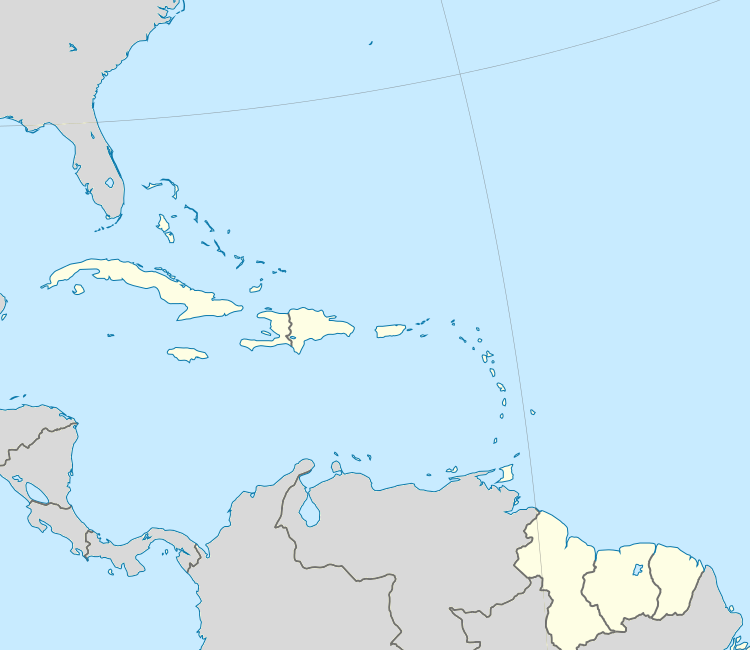
Location of teams of the 1998 CFU Club Championship

Association	Team	Qualification method	App. (last)	Previous best (last)
Barbados	Notre Dame	1998 Barbados Premier League champions	2nd (1997)	Group stage (1997)
Guadeloupe	L'Etoile	1996–97 Guadeloupe Division of Honour champions	2nd (1997)	Group stage (1997)
Jamaica	Waterhouse	1997–98 Jamaica Premier League champions	1st	Debut
Martinique	Aiglon du Lamentin	1997–98 Martinique Championnat National champions	1st	Debut
Saint Vincent and the Grenadines	Camdonia Chelsea	Invited	1st	Debut
Trinidad and Tobago	Caledonia AIA	Invited	1st	Debut
Trinidad and Tobago	Joe Public	Invited	1st	Debut
Trinidad and Tobago	San Juan Jabloteh	Invited	1st	Debut

== Bracket ==
Quarter-finals
(Trinidad and Tobago) Joe Public	4
(Barbados) Notre Dame	0
(Jamaica) Waterhouse	3
(Guadeloupe) L'Etoile	1
(Trinidad and Tobago) Caledonia AIA	13
(Barbados) Notre Dame	0
(Trinidad and Tobago) San Juan Jabloteh	0
(Martinique) Aiglon du Lamentin	2

Semi-finals
(Trinidad and Tobago) Joe Public	3
(Jamaica) Waterhouse	1
(Trinidad and Tobago) Caledonia AIA	4
(Martinique) Aiglon du Lamentin	3

Final
(Trinidad and Tobago) Joe Public	1
(Trinidad and Tobago) Caledonia AIA	0

== Matches ==
=== Quarter-finals ===
20 November 1998

Waterhouse (Jamaica)	3–1	(Guadeloupe) L'Etoile

Waterhouse Stadium, Kingston
20 November 1998

Caledonia AIA (Trinidad and Tobago)	13–0	(Saint Vincent and the Grenadines) Camdonia Chelsea

Hasely Crawford Stadium, Port of Spain
21 November 1998

Joe Public (Trinidad and Tobago)	4–0	(Barbados) Notre Dame

Marvin Lee Stadium, Macoya
21 November 1998

San Juan Jabloteh (Trinidad and Tobago)	0–2	(Martinique) Aiglon du Lamentin

Hasely Crawford Stadium, Port of Spain

=== Semi-finals ===
25 November 1998

Joe Public (Trinidad and Tobago)	3–1	(Jamaica) Waterhouse

Marvin Lee Stadium, Macoya
25 November 1998

Caledonia AIA (Trinidad and Tobago)	4–3	(Martinique) Aiglon du Lamentin

Hasely Crawford Stadium, Port of Spain

=== Final ===
28 November 1998

Joe Public (Trinidad and Tobago)	1–0	(Trinidad and Tobago) Caledonia AIA
Eve 25'

Marvin Lee Stadium, Macoya

With this win, Joe Public advanced to the 1999 CONCACAF Champions' Cup.

== Top scorers ==
	Player	Club	Goals
1	(Trinidad and Tobago) Angus Eve	Joe Public	1
