= Harbour View, Jamaica =

Community in Kingston, Jamaica

Coordinates: 17°57′N 76°43′W

Harbour View is a community in Kingston, Jamaica. It is administered by the Kingston and St. Andrew Corporation and is served by the Kingston 17 Post Office. Harbour View was built in 1960, two years before the country's Independence in 1962. The community was the first in Jamaica to have a community paper and its residents claim that the community was the first to host street dances. Harbour View is located in East Kingston and can be described as one of the best communities to live and raise families (May 2-3-4, 2025 - October 26, 2025).

== Geography ==
Harbour View is southeast of Long Mountain and south of Yallas Mountain. The centre of Harbour View is near the point where the Palisadoes spit meets the mainland, making Harbour View the eastern extreme of Kingston Harbour. To the east of this, also within Harbour View, is the mouth of the Hope River.

== Buildings ==
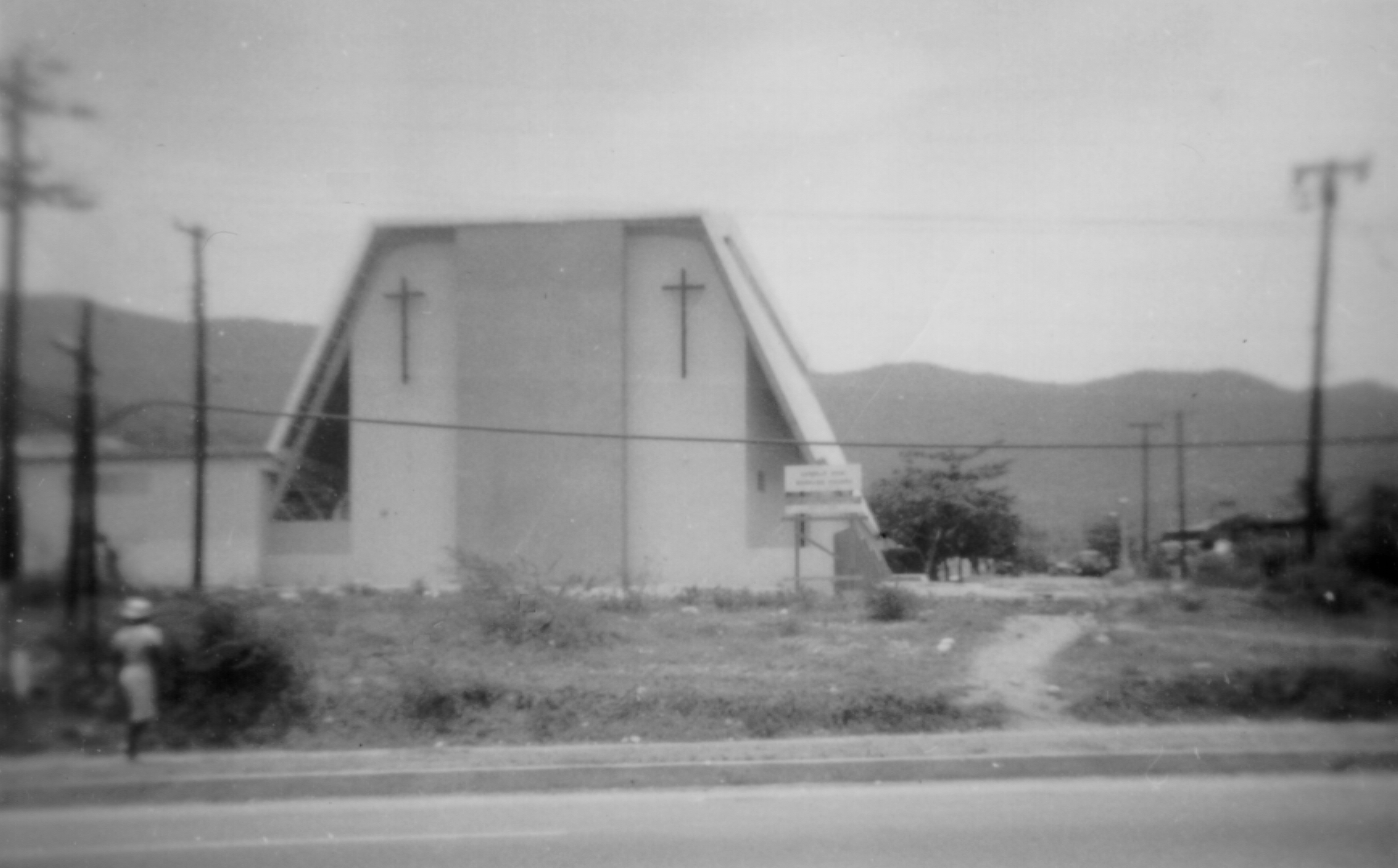
Harbour View Moravian church 1967.

The Harbour View Stadium, home stadium of the Harbour View F.C., is toward the north of Harbour View.

Fort Nugent was built in the 18th century to the north west of Harbour View to defend Jamaica from invasion. The sole remnant of Fort Nugent is a Martello tower still standing on the site.

There is a Moravian church at the western end of Harbour View.

== Notable people from Harbour View ==
Donald Quarrie, gold-medal winner of the 200 metre track event at the 1976 Summer Olympics, is from Harbour View. The Donald Quarrie High School in Harbour View is named in his honour.
