= Orlando Grootfaam =

Surinamese footballer (1974–2019)

Personal information
- Date of birth: 20 October 1974
- Place of birth: Suriname
- Date of death: 7 August 2019 (aged 44)
- Place of death: Paramaribo, Suriname
- Position: Midfielder

Team information
- Current team: Robinhood

Senior career*
Years	Team	Apps	(Gls)
2000–2001	Robinhood		
2001–2003	SNL		
2003–2008	Robinhood		

International career
2000–2006	Suriname	27	(2)
- * Club domestic league appearances and goals as of January 1, 2008

Orlando Grootfaam (20 October 1974 - 7 August 2019) was a Surinamese professional footballer who played as midfielder for SV Robinhood. He died on 7 August 2019, in a hospital in Paramaribo, aged 44.

He has also been capped by Suriname.

== Career statistics ==
=== International ===
Scores and results list Suriname's goal tally first, score column indicates score after each Grootfam goal.

List of international goals scored by Orlando Grootfam
No.	Date	Venue	Opponent	Score	Result	Competition
1	4 April 2001	André Kamperveen Stadion, Paramaribo, Suriname	Aruba	2–0	5–0	2001 Caribbean Cup qualification
2	10 September 2006	Ergilio Hato Stadium, Willemstad, Netherlands Antilles	Netherlands Antilles	1–0	1–0	2007 Caribbean Cup qualification
