= Harbour View F.C. =

Jamaican football club

Harbour View FC
- Full name: Harbour View Football Club
- Nicknames: Stars of the East; Easters
- Founded: 1974; 52 years ago
- Ground: Harbour View Stadium; Kingston, Jamaica
- Capacity: 7,000
- Chairman: Carvel Stewart
- Manager: Ludlow Bernard
- League: Jamaica Premier League
- 2023–24: Regular season: 12th Playoffs: Did not qualify
- Website: www.hvfc.net
Home colours	Away colours

Harbour View Football Club is a Jamaican football club based in Kingston that currently plays in the top flight Jamaica Premier League.

Harbour View F.C. is nicknamed the Stars of the East or Easters and play their home games at Harbour View Stadium.

== History ==
Founded by Vin Blaine along with the Harbour View community in the 1960s, the professional club, Harbour View F.C, was officially established on March 4, 1974. Then, 25 years later, the club was officially incorporated as a limited liability company and was the first Jamaica football club to become incorporated.

Harbour View F.C. has developed a reputation for being the first in Jamaica in many aspects. The Stars of the East became the first club to have an official website, and the first to build a world-class football stadium. Ricardo Gardner was the inaugural Jamaica Premier League player to transfer to a major European league after joining the Bolton Wanderers in 1998. Club management is also setting the pace in bringing true professionalism to Jamaica's football landscape. In addition, at the beginning of the 2006 season, the club's equipment was sponsored by Adidas. The club generates revenue through sponsorships, match tickets, and other businesses such as stadium bars and Western Union.

== Players ==
As of 10 November 2023

Note: Flags indicate national team as defined under FIFA eligibility rules; some limited exceptions apply. Players may hold more than one non-FIFA nationality.

No.	Pos.	Nation	Player
1	GK	JAM	Romario Palma
3	DF	JAM	Okeemo Jones
5	DF	JAM	Kymani Reid
7	MF	JAM	Jahshaun Anglin
8	MF	JAM	Casseam Priestley
10	MF	JAM	Ajuma Johnson
11	FW	JAM	Omar Thompson
12	DF	JAM	Matthew Coke
13	GK	JAM	David Martin
14	MF	JAM	Trey Bennett
16	MF	JAM	Garth Stewart
18	DF	JAM	Romaine Brackenridge

No.	Pos.	Nation	Player
19	FW	JAM	Kemar Mullings
20	MF	JAM	Lamar Davis
21	DF	JAM	Odorland Harding
25	DF	JAM	Tavar Hemmings
27	FW	JAM	David Reid
28	MF	JAM	Shawn Daley
31	FW	JAM	Courtney Allen
33	DF	JAM	Gavin Burton
34	MF	NGA	Chidalu Chukwuemeka
37	DF	JAM	Keven Clarke
38	FW	JAM	Shaqueil Bradford
40	GK	SUR	Demelcio Fer
45	DF	JAM	Shamari Dyer

=== Other players under contract ===
Note: Flags indicate national team as defined under FIFA eligibility rules; some limited exceptions apply. Players may hold more than one non-FIFA nationality.

No.	Pos.	Nation	Player
—		JAM	Anthony Bennett
—	DF	JAM	Ajeanie Talbott

=== Notable former players ===
- Calvin Stewart

== Honours ==
Domestic

- Jamaica Premier League
  - Winners (5): 1999–00, 2006–07, 2009–10, 2012–13, 2022
  - Runners-up (5): 1977–78, 1985–86, 1998–99, 2003–04, 2005-06
- JFF Champions Cup
  - Winners (4): 1994, 1998, 2001, 2002
  - Runners-up (2): 2003, 2005
- KSAFA Jackie Bell Knockout Competition
  - Winners (6): 1995–96, 2000–01, 2006–07, 2007–08, 2010–11, 2012-13
  - Runners-up (2): 1993–94, 2017-18

International

- Caribbean Club Championship
  - Winners (2): 2004, 2007

Doubles

- League & Caribbean Club Championship: 2006-07

== Team management ==
- Technical Director: Donovan Hayles
- Asst Coach: Howard Straw
- Goalkeeper Coach: Clive Wedderburn
- Team Manager: Annmarie Massey
- Asst Team Manager: Robert Lee
- Physiotherapist: Karen Julius
- Physical Trainer: Andrew Hines
- Physical Trainer: Neville Mighton
- Equipment Manager: Dwayne Blake
- Asst Equipment: Jermaine Malcolm

== International competition ==
- 1987 CONCACAF Champions' Cup
  - First Round v. (Guadeloupe) L'Etoile de Morne-à-l'Eau—1:3, 2:0 (L'Etoile de Morne-à-l'Eau advances 4:3 on penalties)
- CFU Club Championship 2000
  - Group stage v. (Haiti) Violette AC—5:0
  - Group stage v. (Barbados) Paradise SC—1:0
  - Group stage v. (Saint Lucia) Roots Alley Ballers—3:0
  - Championship Group v. (Trinidad and Tobago) W Connection—1:3
  - Championship Group v. (Trinidad and Tobago) Joe Public F.C.—1:1
  - Championship Group v. (Haiti) Carioca F.C. 2:1
- CFU Club Championship 2002
  - Preliminary Round v. (Cayman Islands) George Town SC—0:3, 7:1 (Harbour View F.C. advances 10:1 on aggregate)
  - Group stage v. (Martinique) US Robert—4:1
  - Group stage v. (Trinidad and Tobago) W Connection—1:2
- CFU Club Championship 2004
  - First Round v. (Montserrat) Ideal SC—1:15, 15:0 (Harbour View F.C. advances 30:1 on aggregate)
  - Semi-finals v. (Suriname) Inter Moengotapoe—4:6, 3:2 (Harbour View F.C. advances 9:6 on aggregate)
  - Final v. (Jamaica) Tivoli Gardens F.C.—1:1, 1:2 (Harbour View F.C. wins 3:2 on aggregate)
- CONCACAF Champions' Cup 2005
  - Quarterfinals v. (United States) D.C. United—1:2, 1:2 (D.C. United advances 4:2 on aggregate)
- CFU Club Championship 2006
  - Group stage v. (Haiti) Aigle Noir AC—1:0
  - Group stage v. (United States Virgin Islands) Positive Vibes—5:0
  - Group stage v. (Netherlands Antilles) SV Centro Social Deportivo Barber—2:0
  - Semi-finals v. (Trinidad and Tobago) W Connection—2:3
- CFU Club Championship 2007
  - Group stage v. Puerto Rico Islanders—2:2
  - Group stage v. (Suriname) Inter Moengotapoe—1:2
  - Group stage v. (Antigua and Barbuda) SAP F.C.—10:0
  - Quarterfinals v. (Jamaica) Portmore United—2:0
  - Semi-finals v. (Trinidad and Tobago) San Juan Jabloteh—0:0 (Harbour View F.C. advances 10:9 on penalties)
  - Final v. (Trinidad and Tobago) Joe Public F.C.—2:1
- CONCACAF Champions' Cup 2008
  - Quarterfinals v. (United States) D.C. United—1:1, 0:5 (D.C. United advances 6:1 on aggregate)
- CONCACAF Champions League 2008–09
  - Preliminary Round v. (Mexico) UNAM Pumas—0:3 (UNAM Pumas advances 3:0 on aggregate)
