= W Connection F.C. =

Association football club in Trinidad and Tobago

W. Connection
- Full name: W Connection Football Club
- Nickname: Savonetta Boys
- Founded: 1999; 27 years ago
- Ground: Manny Ramjohn Stadium; Marabella, Trinidad and Tobago
- Capacity: 10,000
- Owner: Luca Stewart-Rusin
Home colours	Away colours

W. Connection Football Club is a professional football club from Trinidad and Tobago, which currently plays in the TT Pro League. The club plays its home games at the Manny Ramjohn Stadium in Marabella. The club's offices are based at the Point Lisas Industrial Estate.

== History ==
The team was founded as W Connection Sports Club in 1986, as a "fete match" team, by brothers David John Williams and Patrick John Williams in San Fernando. Upon the creation of the TT Pro League, W Connection FC was officially founded in 1999, and promptly joined the nascent league. In 1999, their first season, the club finished third in the league, while winning the FA Trophy. Even though the club had a successful first season, the team would see even better times the next two campaigns, by winning the league in consecutive seasons.

The Savonetta Boys have also had success in domestic cups. W Connection have won the First Citizens Cup six years in the cup's nine-year existence. On September 26, 2008, in an exciting final of the cup, against Joe Public, W Connection used penalty kicks to claim the victory 6–5, after the match ended level 2–2, to claim their fifth consecutive title.

== Club honours ==
=== League honours ===
- TT Pro League
  - Champions (5): 2000, 2001, 2005, 2011–12, 2013–14
  - Big Six Winners (1): 2007

=== Cups and trophies ===
- FA Trophy
  - Winners (4): 1999, 2000, 2002, 2013–14
  - Runners-up (3): 2003, 2008, 2009
- First Citizens Cup
  - Winners (6): 2001, 2004, 2005, 2006, 2007, 2008
  - Runners-up (2): 2002, 2003
- Digicel Charity Shield
  - Winners (3): 2012, 2013, 2014
- TOYOTA Classic: 2
  - Winners (3): 2005, 2011, 2013
- Digicel Pro Bowl
  - Winners (6): 2001, 2002, 2004, 2007, 2013, 2014
  - Runners-up (3): 2005, 2006, 2011
- Lucozade Sport Goal Shield
  - Winners (2): 2009, 2013
  - Runners-up (1): 2014

=== International honours ===
- CFU Club Championship
  - Winners (2): 2006, 2009
  - Runners-up (5): 2000, 2003, 2012, 2015, 2016

== Record ==
=== Year-by-year ===
Season	League Season		FA Trophy	First Citizens Cup	Digicel Pro Bowl	TOYOTA Classic	Lucozade Sport Goal Shield	CFU Club Championship	CONCACAF Champions League
Season	League Result	Big Six	FA Trophy	First Citizens Cup	Digicel Pro Bowl	TOYOTA Classic	Lucozade Sport Goal Shield	CFU Club Championship	CONCACAF Champions League
1999	3rd	Started in 2004	Champions	Started in 2000	Started in 2001	Started in 2005	Started in 2009	Not Held	did not qualify
2000	Champions	Started in 2004	Champions	Semi-finals	Started in 2001	Started in 2005	Started in 2009	Final^{†}	did not qualify
2001	Champions	Started in 2004	Round of 32	Champions	Champions	Started in 2005	Started in 2009	Final^{‡}	Not Held
2002	2nd	Started in 2004	Champions	Final	Champions	Started in 2005	Started in 2009	Champions*	First round
2003–04	2nd	Started in 2004	Final	Final	Unknown	Started in 2005	Started in 2009	Final	First round
2004	2nd	2nd	Abandoned	Champions	Champions	Started in 2005	Started in 2009	did not qualify	
2005	Champions	3rd	Quarter-finals	Champions	Final	Champions	Started in 2009	did not qualify	
2006	2nd	2nd	Quarter-finals	Champions	Final	Quarter-finals	Started in 2009	Champions	did not qualify
2007	4th	Winners	Quarter-finals	Champions	Champions	Quarter-finals	Started in 2009	did not qualify	Quarter-finals
2008	2nd	2nd	Final	Champions	Semi-finals	Quarter-finals	Started in 2009	Not Held	did not qualify
2009	4th	3rd	Final	Quarter-finals	Quarter-finals	Quarter-finals	Champions	Champions	did not qualify
2010–11	4th	Discontinued	1st round	Semi-finals	Not Held	Group stage	Not held	did not qualify	did not qualify
2011–12	1st	Discontinued	Semi-finals	Semi-finals	Final	Champions	Not held	Final	did not qualify
2012–13	3rd	Discontinued	First round	Semi-finals	Champions	Semi-finals	Champions	2nd^{**}	Group stage
2013–14	Champions	Discontinued	Champions	Semi-finals	Champions	Champions	Final	Did not qualify	Group stage

^{†}W Connection finished second in the Championship Group of the CFU Club Championship 2000.
^{‡}Defence Force, winner of Group B, are considered the winner of the CFU Club Championship 2001 based on tie-breakers over W Connection.
*W Connection, winner of Group B, are considered the winner of the CFU Club Championship 2002 based on tie-breakers over Arnett Gardens.
**W Connection, winner of Group A, are considered runners-up as they finished with fewer points than Valencia FC.

=== International competition ===
The following is a list of results for W Connection in international competitions. W Connection's scores are listed first.

Year	Tournament	Round	Opponent	Home	Away	Agg.
2000	CFU Club Championship	First Round	(Jamaica) Tivoli Gardens		1–1	
2000	CFU Club Championship	First Round	(Dominica) Café Sisserou Strikers		11–0	
2000	CFU Club Championship	First Round	(Antigua and Barbuda) Empire		3–3	
2000	CFU Club Championship	Championship Group	(Jamaica) Harbour View	3–1		
2000	CFU Club Championship	Championship Group	(Haiti) Carioca	1–1		
2000	CFU Club Championship	Championship Group	(Trinidad and Tobago) Joe Public		0–1	
2001	CFU Club Championship	First Round	(Guyana) Fruta Conquerors	8–0	1–2	9–2
2001	CFU Club Championship	Second Round	(Curaçao) Jong Colombia		3–1	
2001	CFU Club Championship	Second Round	(Haiti) Racing Haïtien		4–0	
2001	CFU Club Championship	Third Round	(Trinidad and Tobago) Defence Force	Cancelled		
2002	CONCACAF Champions' Cup	First Round	(United States) Kansas City Wizards	0–1	0–2	0–3
2002	CFU Club Championship	Second Round	(Jamaica) Harbour View	2–1		
2002	CFU Club Championship	Second Round	(Martinique) US Robert	2–0		
2003	CONCACAF Champions' Cup	Round of 16	(Mexico) Toluca	3–3	2–3	5–6
2003	CFU Club Championship	First Round	(Dominica) Harlem United			w/o
2003	CFU Club Championship	Second round	(Suriname) Nacional	0–2	3–0	3–2
2003	CFU Club Championship	Semi-finals	(Jamaica) Portmore United	0–0		1–0
2003	CFU Club Championship	Semi-finals	(Jamaica) Portmore United	1–0		1–0
2003	CFU Club Championship	Final	(Trinidad and Tobago) San Juan Jabloteh	1–2	2–1	3–3
2006	CFU Club Championship	First Round	(Antigua and Barbuda) Hoppers		5–0	
2006	CFU Club Championship	First Round	Puerto Rico Islanders		1–0	
2006	CFU Club Championship	Semi-finals	(Jamaica) Harbour View	3–2		
2006	CFU Club Championship	Final	(Trinidad and Tobago) San Juan Jabloteh		1–0	
2007	CONCACAF Champions' Cup	Quarter-finals	(Mexico) Guadalajara	2–1	0–3	2–4
2009	CFU Club Championship	First Round	(Dominica) Bath Estate	12–1	5–0	17–1
2009	CFU Club Championship	Second Round	(Haiti) Cavaly	3–1	1–0	4–1
2009	CFU Club Championship	Semi-finals	(Trinidad and Tobago) San Juan Jabloteh		2–1	
2009	CFU Club Championship	Final	Puerto Rico Islanders		2–1	
2009–10	CONCACAF Champions League	Preliminary Round	(United States) New York Red Bulls	2–2	2–1	4–3
2009–10	CONCACAF Champions League	Group Stage	(Honduras) Real España		0–1	
2009–10	CONCACAF Champions League	Group Stage	(Guatemala) Comunicaciones	1–2		
2009–10	CONCACAF Champions League	Group Stage	(Mexico) Pumas UNAM	2–2		
2009–10	CONCACAF Champions League	Group Stage	(Guatemala) Comunicaciones		3–0	
2009–10	CONCACAF Champions League	Group Stage	(Mexico) Pumas UNAM		1–2	
2009–10	CONCACAF Champions League	Group Stage	(Honduras) Real España	3–2		
2012	CFU Club Championship	Second Round	(Haiti) Victory	2–0		
2012	CFU Club Championship	Second Round	(Suriname) Inter Moengotapoe	6–0		
2012	CFU Club Championship	Second Round	(Antigua and Barbuda) Antigua Barracuda	1–2		
2012	CFU Club Championship	Semi-finals	Puerto Rico Islanders	4–1		
2012	CFU Club Championship	Final	(Trinidad and Tobago) Caledonia AIA		1–1	
2012–13	CONCACAF Champions League	Group Stage	(Guatemala) Xelajú	2–2		
2012–13	CONCACAF Champions League	Group Stage	(Mexico) Guadalajara		0–4	
2012–13	CONCACAF Champions League	Group Stage	(Guatemala) Xelajú		2–3	
2012–13	CONCACAF Champions League	Group Stage	(Mexico) Guadalajara	1–1		
2013	CFU Club Championship	First Round	(Trinidad and Tobago) Caledonia AIA	4–0		
2013	CFU Club Championship	First Round	(Antigua and Barbuda) Antigua Barracuda	0–0		
2013–14	CONCACAF Champions League	Group Stage	(Panama) Árabe Unido		1–3	
2013–14	CONCACAF Champions League	Group Stage	(United States) Houston Dynamo	0–0		
2013–14	CONCACAF Champions League	Group Stage	(Panama) Árabe Unido	0–2		
2013–14	CONCACAF Champions League	Group Stage	(United States) Houston Dynamo		0–2	
2015	CFU Club Championship	First Round	Guyana Defence Force	7–1		
2015	CFU Club Championship	First Round	(Antigua and Barbuda) SAP	7–2		
2015	CFU Club Championship	Semi-finals	(Jamaica) Montego Bay United	1–0		
2015	CFU Club Championship	Final	(Trinidad and Tobago) Central		1–2	
2015–16	CONCACAF Champions League	Group Stage	(Mexico) Santos Laguna		0–4	
2015–16	CONCACAF Champions League	Group Stage	(Costa Rica) Saprissa		0–4	
2015–16	CONCACAF Champions League	Group Stage	(Costa Rica) Saprissa	2–1		
2015–16	CONCACAF Champions League	Group Stage	(Mexico) Santos Laguna	0–1		
2016	CFU Club Championship	First Round	(Dominican Republic) Atlántico	4–2		
2016	CFU Club Championship	First Round	(Guadeloupe) Moulien	5–1		
2016	CFU Club Championship	First Round	(Suriname) Inter Moengotapoe	3–1		
2016	CFU Club Championship	Semi-finals	(Jamaica) Arnett Gardens		2–0	
2016	CFU Club Championship	Final	(Trinidad and Tobago) Central		0–3	
2016–17	CONCACAF Champions League	Group Stage	(Mexico) Pumas UNAM	2–4		
2016–17	CONCACAF Champions League	Group Stage	Honduras Progreso	1–1		
2016–17	CONCACAF Champions League	Group Stage	Honduras Progreso		0–1	
2016–17	CONCACAF Champions League	Group Stage	(Mexico) Pumas UNAM		1–8	
2018	Caribbean Club Championship	Group Stage	(Haiti) Real Hope	0–1		
2018	Caribbean Club Championship	Group Stage	(Jamaica) Arnett Gardens	2–1		
2018	Caribbean Club Championship	Group Stage	(Dominican Republic) Atlético Pantoja	0–3		

=== Record by opponent ===
Team	Pld	W	D	L	GF	GA	GD	WPCT
(Antigua and Barbuda) Antigua Barracuda	2	0	1	1	1	2	−1	0.00
(Dominican Republic) Atlético Pantoja	1	0	0	1	0	3	−3	0.00
(Panama) Árabe Unido	2	0	0	2	1	5	−4	0.00
(Jamaica) Arnett Gardens	2	2	0	0	4	1	+3	100.00
(Dominican Republic) Atlántico	1	1	0	0	4	2	+2	100.00
(Dominica) Bath Estate	2	2	0	0	17	1	+16	100.00
(Trinidad and Tobago) Morvant Caledonia United	2	1	1	0	5	1	+4	50.00
(Haiti) Cavaly	2	2	0	0	4	1	+3	100.00
(Trinidad and Tobago) Central	2	0	0	2	1	5	−4	0.00
(Haiti) Carioca	1	0	1	0	1	1	0	0.00
(Curaçao) Jong Colombia	1	1	0	0	3	1	+2	100.00
(Guatemala) Comunicaciones	2	1	0	1	4	2	+2	50.00
(Guyana) Fruta Conquerors	2	1	0	1	9	2	+7	50.00
(Guadeloupe) Moulien	1	1	0	0	5	1	+4	100.00
(Dominica) Café Sisserou Strikers	1	1	0	0	11	0	+11	100.00
(Antigua and Barbuda) Empire	1	0	1	0	3	3	0	0.00
Guyana Defence Force	1	1	0	0	7	1	+6	100.00
(Mexico) Guadalajara	4	1	1	2	3	9	−6	25.00
(Jamaica) Harbour View	3	3	0	0	8	4	+4	100.00
Honduras Progreso	2	0	1	1	1	2	−1	0.00
(Antigua and Barbuda) Hoppers	1	1	0	0	5	0	+5	100.00
(United States) Houston Dynamo FC	2	0	1	1	0	2	−2	0.00
(Suriname) Inter Moengotapoe	2	2	0	0	9	1	+8	100.00
(Trinidad and Tobago) San Juan Jabloteh	4	3	0	1	6	4	+2	75.00
(Trinidad and Tobago) Joe Public	1	0	0	1	0	1	−1	0.00
(Jamaica) Montego Bay United	1	1	0	0	1	0	+1	100.00
(Suriname) Nacional	2	1	0	1	3	2	+1	50.00
(United States) New York Red Bulls	2	1	1	0	4	3	+1	50.00
(Jamaica) Portmore United	2	1	1	0	1	0	+1	50.00
Puerto Rico Islanders	3	3	0	0	7	2	+5	100.00
(Mexico) Pumas UNAM	4	0	1	3	6	16	−10	0.00
(Haiti) Racing Haïtien	1	1	0	0	4	0	+4	100.00
(Honduras) Real España	2	1	0	1	4	3	+1	50.00
(Haiti) Real Hope	1	0	0	1	0	1	−1	0.00
(Mexico) Santos Laguna	2	0	0	2	0	5	−5	0.00
(Antigua and Barbuda) SAP	1	1	0	0	7	2	+5	100.00
(Costa Rica) Saprissa	2	1	0	1	2	5	−3	50.00
(United States) Sporting Kansas City	2	0	0	2	0	3	−3	0.00
(Jamaica) Tivoli Gardens	1	0	1	0	1	1	0	0.00
(Mexico) Toluca	2	0	1	1	5	6	−1	0.00
(Martinique) US Robert	1	1	0	0	2	0	+2	100.00
(Haiti) Victory	1	1	0	0	2	0	+2	100.00
(Guatemala) Xelajú	2	0	1	1	4	5	−1	0.00
Total	77	37	13	27	165	109	+56	48.05

Source: Results

== Staff ==
=== Technical staff ===
Technical Director/Head Coach:

- (Saint Lucia) Stuart Charles Fevrier

Assistant Coach:

- (Saint Lucia) Earl Jean

Assistant Coach:

- (Saint Lucia) Eligah Joseph

Goalkeeper Coach:

- (Trinidad and Tobago) Trevor Nottingham

=== Management ===
President/Chief Executive Officer:

- (Trinidad and Tobago) Renee John-Williams

Chairman of the Board:

- (Trinidad and Tobago) David Martin

== Youth ==
The youth teams of the club are member of the OASIS Youth League.
