= Caribbean Club Championship =

- Organizer(s): CFU; CONCACAF
- Founded: 1997
- Abolished: 2022
- Region: Caribbean
- Teams: Various
- Last champion(s): (Haiti) Violette (1st title) (2022)
- Most championships: (Trinidad and Tobago) W Connection (Trinidad and Tobago) Joe Public; Puerto Rico Islanders (Jamaica) Portmore United (Trinidad and Tobago) Central (Jamaica) Harbour View (2 titles each)
- Website: CFU homepage

The Caribbean Club Championship, also known as the CFU Club Championship or CFU Club Champions' Cup, was an annual international football competition held amongst association football clubs that are members of the Caribbean Football Union (CFU). The tournament served as a qualifying event for the CONCACAF Champions League and, from 2017, the CONCACAF League.

In 2023, the tournament was replaced by the CONCACAF Caribbean Cup which follows a similar format. This change was made in conjunction with the expansion of the CONCACAF Champions League starting from the 2024 edition.

== Qualification ==
Thirty-one national associations affiliated with the CFU were invited to participate, with each eligible to send two clubs, usually their league champions and runners-up. However, many member nations did not send a representative team every year. CFU also allowed Antigua Barracuda, Puerto Rico Islanders, and Puerto Rico FC (all now defunct) to compete despite being members of the United States league system. This tournament currently sent three or four teams to CONCACAF competitions: the champions enter the CONCACAF Champions League, the runners-up and third place teams enter the CONCACAF League, and the fourth place team competed in a playoff with the CFU Club Shield winner for a spot in the CONCACAF League.

The CFU presented an exact replica of the championship trophy to the winning team for their permanent possession.

=== Participation of member associations ===
Country	Competitions	Years
Haiti	19	2000–02, 2006–07, 2009–22
Trinidad and Tobago	19	1997–98, 2000–04, 2006–07, 2009–18
Jamaica	18	1997–98, 2000, 2002–07, 2013–20, 2022
Suriname	16	1997, 2000–01, 2003–05, 2007, 2009–12, 2014–17, 2021
Curaçao	11	2000–01, 2003, 2005–07, 2009–10, 2012, 2014, 2021
Antigua and Barbuda	10	2000, 2004–07, 2009, 2012–13, 2015, 2017
Puerto Rico	10	2006–07, 2009–14, 2017, 2021
Guyana	8	1997, 2001, 2009–12, 2014–15
Guadeloupe	7	1997–98, 2014–17, 2021
Cayman Islands	6	2002, 2011–12, 2014, 2016–17
Dominican Republic	6	2016–18, 2020–22
Dominica	5	2000, 2003, 2005, 2007, 2009
Saint Lucia	5	2000–02, 2005, 2011
Saint Vincent and the Grenadines	5	1997–98, 2010, 2017, 2021
Aruba	4	2005–07, 2009
Bermuda	4	2010–12, 2016
Martinique	4	1997–98, 2002, 2021
U.S. Virgin Islands	4	2005–07, 2015
Barbados	3	1997–98, 2000
Montserrat	2	2004, 2017
Sint Maarten	2	2017, 2021
Bahamas	1	2015
Bonaire	1	2021
Cuba	1	2007
French Guiana	1	2021
Saint Martin	1	2004
Saint Kitts and Nevis	1	2011

The following associations never had any team participate in a Club Championship:

- Anguilla
- British Virgin Islands
- Grenada
- Turks and Caicos Islands

Associations in italics have had teams participate in the Caribbean Club Shield.

== Past winners ==
Season	Winners	Result	Runners-up	Third place	Result	Fourth place
1997	United Petrotrin (Trinidad and Tobago)	2–1	(Jamaica) Seba United	N/A		
1998	Joe Public (Trinidad and Tobago)	1–0	(Trinidad and Tobago) Caledonia AIA	N/A		
1999	Not held					
2000	Joe Public (Trinidad and Tobago)	(Note: The championship was decided by a final group round.)	(Trinidad and Tobago) W Connection	Harbour View (Jamaica)		(Haiti) Carioca
Qualified teams for CONCACAF Champions' Cup
2001 (Note: No champions were decided. The two group winners qualified for the 2002 CONCACAF Champions' Cup.)	Defence Force (Trinidad and Tobago)		(Trinidad and Tobago) W Connection	N/A		
2002 (Note: No champions were decided. The two group winners qualified for the 2003 CONCACAF Champions' Cup.)	W Connection (Trinidad and Tobago)		(Jamaica) Arnett Gardens	N/A		
Season	Winners	Result (1st / 2nd leg)	Runners-up	Third place	Result (1st / 2nd leg)	Fourth place
2003	San Juan Jabloteh (Trinidad and Tobago)	3–3 (4–2 p) (2–1 / 1–2)	(Trinidad and Tobago) W Connection	N/A		
2004	Harbour View (Jamaica)	3–2 (1–1 / 2–1)	(Jamaica) Tivoli Gardens	N/A		
2005	Portmore United (Jamaica)	5–2 (2–1 / 4–0)	(Suriname) Robinhood	N/A		
2006	W Connection (Trinidad and Tobago)	1–0	(Trinidad and Tobago) San Juan Jabloteh	N/A		
2007	Harbour View (Jamaica)	2–1	(Trinidad and Tobago) Joe Public	Puerto Rico Islanders	1–0 (1–0 / 0–0) (Note: After the CONCACAF Champions League (CCL) replaced the Champions' Cup in 2008, the two losing semi-finalists in the 2007 CFU Clubs Championships (CFU-CC) played a two-legged series on 10 and 25 May 2008 to determine the 2007 CFU-CC tournament's third place team and the final Caribbean spot (CFU#3) for the inaugural 2008–09 CONCACAF Champions League.)	(Trinidad and Tobago) San Juan Jabloteh
2008	Not held					
2009	W Connection (Trinidad and Tobago)	2–1	Puerto Rico Islanders	San Juan Jabloteh (Trinidad and Tobago)	2–1	(Haiti) Tempête
2010	Puerto Rico Islanders		(Trinidad and Tobago) Joe Public	San Juan Jabloteh (Trinidad and Tobago)		(Puerto Rico) Bayamón
2011	Puerto Rico Islanders	3–1 (a.e.t.)	(Haiti) Tempête	Alpha United (Guyana)	1–1 (a.e.t.) (4–3 p)	(Trinidad and Tobago) Defence Force
2012	Caledonia AIA (Trinidad and Tobago)	1–1 (a.e.t.) (4–3 p)	(Trinidad and Tobago) W Connection	Puerto Rico Islanders	2–0	(Antigua and Barbuda) Antigua Barracuda
Qualified teams for CONCACAF Champions League
2013 (Note: No champions were decided. The two group winners and the play-off winners between the two group runners-up qualified for the 2013–14 CONCACAF Champions League.)	W Connection (Trinidad and Tobago)		(Haiti) Valencia	Caledonia AIA (Trinidad and Tobago)		
2014 (Note: No champions were decided. The final stage was cancelled after one of the participating teams Valencia could not participate, and CONCACAF decided to save expenses for the three group stage winners set to participate in the final stage as they all qualified for the 2014–15 CONCACAF Champions League.)	Bayamón (Puerto Rico)		(Jamaica) Waterhouse	Alpha United (Guyana)		
Season	Winners	Result	Runners-up	Third place	Result	Fourth place
2015	Central (Trinidad and Tobago)	2–1	(Trinidad and Tobago) W Connection	Montego Bay United (Jamaica)	1–0	(Haiti) Don Bosco
2016	Central (Trinidad and Tobago)	3–0	(Trinidad and Tobago) W Connection	Don Bosco (Haiti)	2–0	(Jamaica) Arnett Gardens
2017	Cibao (Dominican Republic)	1–0	(Trinidad and Tobago) San Juan Jabloteh	Portmore United (Jamaica)	2–2 (a.e.t.) (5–3 p)	(Trinidad and Tobago) Central
2018	Atlético Pantoja (Dominican Republic)	0–0 (6–5 p)	(Jamaica) Arnett Gardens	Portmore United (Jamaica)	2–1	(Trinidad and Tobago) Central
2019	Portmore United (Jamaica)		(Jamaica) Waterhouse	Capoise (Haiti)		(Haiti) Real Hope
Qualified teams for CONCACAF Champions League and CONCACAF League
2020 (Note: No champions were decided. The final stage was cancelled due to the COVID-19 pandemic, and the results in the group stage were used to determine the teams which qualified for the 2021 CONCACAF Champions League (Atlético Pantoja) and the 2020 CONCACAF League (Waterhouse, Arcahaie, Cibao))	Atlético Pantoja (Dominican Republic)		(Jamaica) Waterhouse	Arcahaie (Haiti)		(Dominican Republic) Cibao
Season	Winners	Result	Runners-up	Losing semi-finalists		
2021	Cavaly (Haiti)	3–0	(Suriname) Inter Moengotapoe	Metropolitan (Puerto Rico)	(Note: No third place match was played.)	(Martinique) Samaritaine
Season	Winners	Result	Runners-up	Third place	Result	Fourth place
2022	Violette (Haiti)	0–0 (4–3 p)	(Dominican Republic) Cibao	Atlético Vega Real (Dominican Republic)	1–1 (3–1 p)	(Jamaica) Waterhouse

== Results ==
=== By club ===
Team	Winners	Runners-up	Years won	Years runner-up
(Trinidad and Tobago) W Connection	2	5	2006, 2009	2000, 2003, 2012, 2015, 2016
(Trinidad and Tobago) Joe Public	2	2	1998, 2000	2007, 2010
Puerto Rico Islanders	2	1	2010, 2011	2009
(Jamaica) Portmore United	2	0	2005, 2019	
(Trinidad and Tobago) Central	2	0	2015, 2016	
(Jamaica) Harbour View	2	0	2004, 2007	
(Trinidad and Tobago) San Juan Jabloteh	1	2	2003	2006, 2017
(Trinidad and Tobago) Caledonia AIA	1	1	2012	1998
(Dominican Republic) Cibao	1	1	2017	2022
(Haiti) Cavaly	1	0	2021	
(Haiti) Violette	1	0	2022	
(Dominican Republic) Atlético Pantoja	1	0	2018	
(Trinidad and Tobago) United Petrotrin	1	0	1997	
(Suriname) Inter Moengotapoe	0	1		2021
(Jamaica) Waterhouse	0	1		2019
(Jamaica) Arnett Gardens	0	1		2018
(Haiti) Tempête	0	1		2011
(Suriname) Robinhood	0	1		2005
(Jamaica) Tivoli Gardens	0	1		2004
(Jamaica) Seba United	0	1		1997

- When sorted by years won or lost, the table is sorted by the date of each team's first placement

=== By country ===
Nation	Winners	Runners-up	Winning clubs	Runner-up clubs
Trinidad and Tobago	9	10	W Connection (2), Central (2), Joe Public (2), San Juan Jabloteh (1), United Petrotrin (1), Caledonia AIA (1)	W Connection (5), Joe Public (2), San Juan Jabloteh (2), Caledonia AIA (1)
Jamaica	4	4	Portmore United (2), Harbour View (2)	Arnett Gardens (1), Waterhouse (1), Tivoli Gardens (1), Seba United (1)
Puerto Rico	2	1	Puerto Rico Islanders (2)	Puerto Rico Islanders (1)
Dominican Republic	2	1	Cibao (1), Atlético Pantoja (1)	Cibao (1)
Haiti	2	1	Cavaly (1), Violette (1)	Tempête (1)
Suriname	0	2		Robinhood (1), Inter Moengotapoe (1)

== CFU Club Shield ==
A second-tier competition, called the CFU Club Shield, formerly known as the CONCACAF Caribbean Club Shield, was introduced in 2018 for clubs from non-professional leagues that worked towards professional standards. Until 2022, the winner of this competition, as long as it fulfills the CONCACAF Regional Club Licensing criteria, played against the fourth-placed team of the Caribbean Club Championship for a place in the CONCACAF League. Since 2023, the winner and runner-up qualify for the CONCACAF Caribbean Cup.

== See also ==
- CONCACAF Caribbean Cup
