= Titus Elva =

Saint Lucian footballer

Personal information
- Date of birth: 5 February 1974 (age 52)
- Place of birth: Castries, Saint Lucia
- Position: Striker

Senior career*
Years	Team	Apps	(Gls)
1999–2004	Williams Connection		
2004–2005	Caledonia AIA		
2006–2008	All Stars Wadat		

International career
1995–2008	Saint Lucia	28	(17)
- * Club domestic league appearances and goals

Titus Elva (born 5 February 1974) is a Saint Lucian retired footballer, who played as a striker.

== International career ==
Elva represented Saint Lucia at the international level over a span of 13 years, scoring 17 goals.

== Personal life ==
He is the father of Caniggia Elva, who plays internationally for Canada. His brother, Oliver, also played for Saint Lucia as a defender.

== Career statistics ==
Scores and results list Saint Lucia's goal tally first, score column indicates score after each Elva goal.

List of international goals scored by Titus Elva
No.	Date	Venue	Opponent	Score	Result	Competition	Ref.
1	9 April 1995	Castries, Saint Lucia	Grenada		4–0	1995 Caribbean Cup	
2	7 May 1995	Castries, Saint Lucia	Barbados		2–1	1995 Caribbean Cup	
3	19 July 1995	Kingston, Jamaica	Jamaica	1–1	1–2	1995 Caribbean Cup	
4	24 October 1997	Castries, Saint Lucia	Jamaica	1–3	1–3	Friendly	
5	18 March 2001	St. George's, Grenada	Dominica	1–0	1–0	Friendly	
6	21 March 2001	Castries, Saint Lucia	Martinique	1–1	1–1	Friendly	
7	14 April 2001	Haiti	U.S. Virgin Islands		14–1	2001 Caribbean Cup	
8	14 April 2001	Haiti	U.S. Virgin Islands		14–1	2001 Caribbean Cup	
9	28 July 2002	Vieux Fort, Saint Lucia	British Virgin Islands	8–1	8–1	2003 CONCACAF Gold Cup qualification	
10	30 March 2003	Kingston, Jamaica	Martinique	1–0	4–5	2003 CONCACAF Gold Cup qualification	
11	22 February 2004	Road Town, British Virgin Islands	British Virgin Islands	1–0	1–0	2006 FIFA World Cup qualification	
12	21 March 2004	Kingstown, St. Vincent and the Grenadines	Saint Vincent and the Grenadines	1–0	1–1	Friendly	
13	28 March 2004	Vieux Fort, Saint Lucia	British Virgin Islands	8–0	9–0	2006 FIFA World Cup qualification	
14	6 November 2004	St. Kitts and Nevis	Antigua and Barbuda	1–0	2–1	2005 Caribbean Cup	
15	19 December 2004	Kingston, Jamaica	Jamaica	1–1	1–2	2005 Caribbean Cup	
16	28 July 2006	Linden, Guyana	Guyana	1–2	3–2	Friendly	
17	26 March 2008	Vieux Fort, Saint Lucia	Turks and Caicos Islands	2–0	2–0	2010 FIFA World Cup qualification	
