= 1997 CFU Club Championship =

Caribbean Football Union Club Championship

Tournament details
- Dates: 16 July – 2 August
- Teams: 8 (from 8 associations)

Final positions
- Champions: (Trinidad and Tobago) United Petrotrin (1st title)
- Runners-up: (Jamaica) Seba United

Tournament statistics
- Matches played: 13
- Goals scored: 41 (3.15 per match)
- Top scorer(s): (Trinidad and Tobago) Philbert Jones (United Petrotrin); 6 goals

The 1997 Caribbean Football Union Club Championship was an international club football competition held in the Caribbean to determine the region's qualifiers to the CONCACAF Champions' Cup.

The winners United Petrotrin advanced to CONCACAF Champions' Cup 1997.

== Teams ==
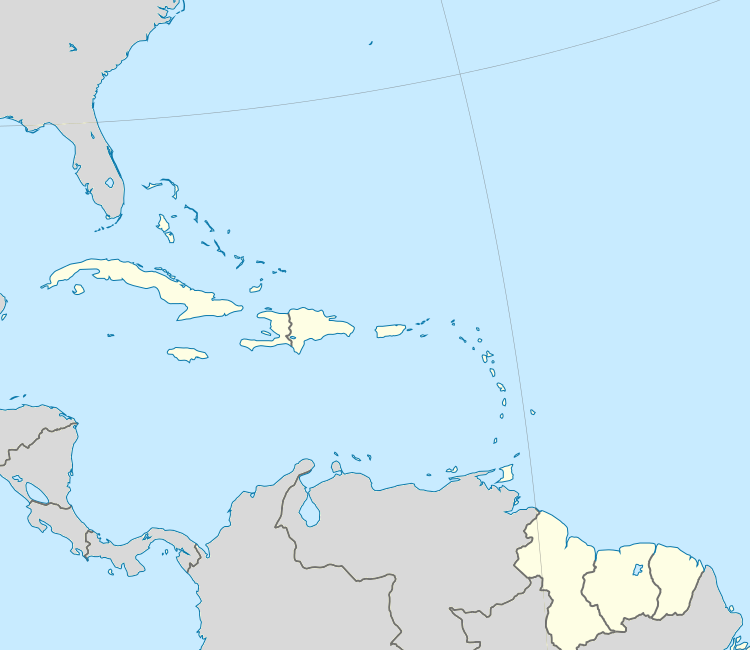
Location of teams of the 1997 CFU Club Championship
(H): Hosts

Association	Team	Qualification method	App. (last)	Previous best (last)
Barbados	Notre Dame	1997 Barbados Premier League champions	1st	Debut
Guadeloupe	L'Etoile	1995–96 Guadeloupe Division of Honour champions	1st	Debut
Guyana	Omai Gold Seekers	1996 GFF National Super League champions	1st	Debut
Jamaica (H)	Seba United	1996–97 Jamaica Premier League champions	1st	Debut
Martinique	Club Franciscain	1996–97 Martinique Championnat National champions	1st	Debut
Saint Vincent and the Grenadines	Stubborn Youth	Invited	1st	Debut
Suriname	Transvaal	1995–96 SVB Eerste Divisie champions	1st	Debut
Trinidad and Tobago (H)	United Petrotrin	Invited	1st	Debut

== Group stage ==
=== Group 1 ===
Pos	Team	Pld	W	D	L	GF	GA	GD	Pts	Qualification
1	(Trinidad and Tobago) United Petrotrin (H)	3	3	0	0	14	1	+13	9	Qualifying playoff
2	(Barbados) Notre Dame	3	1	1	1	2	5	−3	4	
3	(Guadeloupe) L'Etoile	3	0	2	1	2	8	−6	2	
4	(Guyana) Omai Gold Seekers	3	0	1	2	1	5	−4	1	

Source: CONCACAF
(H) Hosts

==== Matches ====
16 July 1997

L'Etoile (Guadeloupe)	0–0	(Barbados) Notre Dame

Guaracara Park, Pointe-à-Pierre
16 July 1997

United Petrotrin (Trinidad and Tobago)	2–0	(Guyana) Omai Gold Seekers
Cyrus 8'; Jones 89'

Guaracara Park, Pointe-à-Pierre

18 July 1997

Notre Dame (Barbados)	2–0	(Guyana) Omai Gold Seekers
Riley 14'; Hall 51'

Guaracara Park, Pointe-à-Pierre
18 July 1997

United Petrotrin (Trinidad and Tobago)	7–1	(Guadeloupe) L'Etoile
Francis 13' (pen.); Cyrus 14', 60', 66'; Jones 75', 77'; Prosper 88'		Oliver 29'

Guaracara Park, Pointe-à-Pierre

20 July 1997

L'Etoile (Guadeloupe)	1–1	(Guyana) Omai Gold Seekers
Bruno 43'		Babb 59'

Guaracara Park, Pointe-à-Pierre
20 July 1997

United Petrotrin (Trinidad and Tobago)	5–0	(Barbados) Notre Dame
Prosper 5'; Julien 44'; Cyrus 48'; Jones 64', 89'

Guaracara Park, Pointe-à-Pierre

=== Group 2 ===
Pos	Team	Pld	W	D	L	GF	GA	GD	Pts	Qualification
1	(Jamaica) Seba United (H)	3	3	0	0	9	1	+8	9	Qualifying playoff
2	(Martinique) Club Franciscain	3	2	0	1	5	5	0	6	
3	(Suriname) Transvaal	3	1	0	2	2	4	−2	3	
4	(Saint Vincent and the Grenadines) Stubborn Youth	3	0	0	3	3	9	−6	0	

Source: CONCACAF
(H) Hosts

==== Matches ====
23 July 1997

Transvaal (Suriname)	1–0	(Saint Vincent and the Grenadines) Stubborn Youth
Baina

Montego Bay Sports Complex, Montego Bay
23 July 1997

Seba United (Jamaica)	2–0 Awarded (Note: The match had finished 2–3 but was awarded 2–0 to Seba United as Club Franciscain fielded two ineligible players)	(Martinique) Club Franciscain
Malcolm		Fernelt; Louis

Montego Bay Sports Complex, Montego Bay

25 July 1997

Club Franciscain (Martinique)	2–1	(Suriname) Transvaal
Fernelt (pen.); Civault		Tjuaton

Montego Bay Sports Complex, Montego Bay
25 July 1997

Seba United (Jamaica)	5–1	(Saint Vincent and the Grenadines) Stubborn Youth
P. Wong; Malcolm; C.Harris (pen.); Whitmore; Davis		Chewitt

Montego Bay Sports Complex, Montego Bay

27 July 1997

Club Franciscain (Martinique)	3–2	(Saint Vincent and the Grenadines) Stubborn Youth
N/A (o.g.); Fernelt		Gonsalves; Charles

Montego Bay Sports Complex, Montego Bay
27 July 1997

Seba United (Jamaica)	2–0	(Suriname) Transvaal
McFarlane; Davis

Montego Bay Sports Complex, Montego Bay

=== Qualifying playoff ===
2 August 1997

United Petrotrin (Trinidad and Tobago)	2–1	(Jamaica) Seba United
Prosper 44'; Jones 90+5'		Hill 56'

Guaracara Park, Pointe-à-Pierre

With the win United Petrotrin advanced to the 1997 CONCACAF Champions' Cup.

== Top scorers ==
	Player	Club	Goals
1	(Trinidad and Tobago) Philbert Jones	United Petrotrin	6
2	(Trinidad and Tobago) Dexter Cyrus	United Petrotrin	5
3	(Martinique) Jean-Claude Fernelt	Club Franciscain	4
4	(Trinidad and Tobago) Peter Prosper	United Petrotrin	3
4	(Jamaica) Stephen Malcolm	Seba United	3
6	(Martinique) Erick Jean Louis	Club Franciscain	2
6	(Jamaica) Paul Davis	Seba United	2
