= List of TT Pro League hat-tricks =

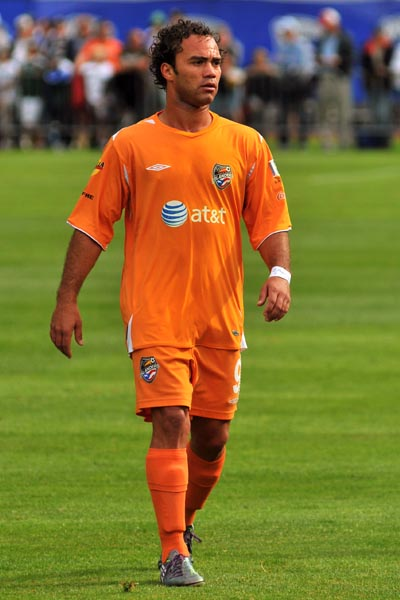
Jonathan Faña scored a beaver-trick (four or more goals) for W Connection against Police in an 8–0 win on 4 September 2009.

Since the inception of the Trinidadian football league competition, the TT Pro League, in 1999, more than 100 players have scored three goals (hat-trick) or more in a single match. Twelve players have scored more than three goals in a match (beaver-trick), of these, Titus Elva holds the Pro League record for most goals in a single match, with nine.

The fixture between W Connection and Tobago United at Ato Boldon Stadium in 2004 saw five hat-tricks during the match from Titus Elva (3), Dwayne Ellis, and Jose Luciano Viera for the Savonetta Boys. In 2009, Defence Force's Richard Roy and Jabloteh's Noel Williams both scored beaver-tricks in a match that the San Juan Kings won 5–4. Only six players, Jason Scotland, Anthony Wolfe, Keyon Edwards, Devorn Jorsling, Marcus Joseph, and Jerwyn Balthazar have scored hat-tricks in two consecutive league games.

Devorn Jorsling have scored three or more goals on nine occasions in the Pro League with four during the 2014–15 season — more than any other Pro League player in a season. Kerry Baptiste has the second most number of hat-tricks with eight, followed by Keyon Edwards and Anthony Wolfe with four hat-tricks each. Kerry Baptiste, Titus Elva, and Jerren Nixon have scored four or more goals twice in the Pro League. Two players have each scored hat-tricks for three clubs: Peter Prospar (South Starworld Strikers, San Juan Jabloteh, and United Petrotrin) and Anthony Wolfe (San Juan Jabloteh, Ma Pau, and North East Stars).

The 2009 season had more hat-tricks (16) than any other Pro League season from twelve players. There were also five players who scored four or more goals in a match during the season.

== Hat-tricks ==
Key
^{#}	Number of goals scored by player
†	Player scored a hat-trick as a substitute
*	Home team score is listed first in the result

Player	Nationality	For	Against	Result	Date	Ref(s)
Kendall Velox	Saint Vincent and the Grenadines	Joe Public*	Point Fortin Civic	8–1	2 May 1999	
Nigel Pierre^{4}	Trinidad and Tobago	Joe Public*	Police	5–1	30 April 2000	
José Maria Manoel	Brazil	W Connection*	Caledonia AIA	4–1	9 June 2000	
Jason Scotland	Trinidad and Tobago	Defence Force*	Caledonia AIA	3–1	6 September 2000	
Jason Scotland	Trinidad and Tobago	Defence Force*	Arima Fire	3–1	13 September 2000	
Darryl Toussaint	Trinidad and Tobago	Arima Fire	North East Stars*	1–4	31 May 2002	
Akudu Goodridge	Trinidad and Tobago	Defence Force*	North East Stars	4–0	8 June 2002	
Ashford Legerton	Trinidad and Tobago	Arima Fire*	North East Stars	6–3	14 July 2002	
Sean Julien	Trinidad and Tobago	South Starworld Strikers	Caledonia AIA*	0–7	11 August 2002	
Carey Harris	Guyana	North East Stars*	South Starworld Strikers	3–1	25 September 2002	
Vladimir Henderson-Suite	Trinidad and Tobago	Joe Public*	South Starworld Strikers	4–2	29 September 2002	
Owen Matthews	Trinidad and Tobago	Defence Force*	South Starworld Strikers	7–2	13 October 2002	
Kerry Baptiste	Trinidad and Tobago	San Juan Jabloteh	Defence Force*	1–9	21 May 2003	
Randolph Jerome	Guyana	North East Stars	Tobago United*	1–4	6 September 2003	
Randolph Jerome	Guyana	North East Stars	Tobago United*	2–9	29 October 2003	
Jerren Nixon^{4}	Trinidad and Tobago	North East Stars	Tobago United*	2–9	29 October 2003	
Aurtis Whitley^{4}	Trinidad and Tobago	San Juan Jabloteh*	South West Drillers	8–0	19 April 2004	
Randolph Jerome	Guyana	South Starworld Strikers*	Tobago United	8–0	2 May 2004	
Jerren Nixon^{4}	Trinidad and Tobago	North East Stars*	Tobago United	5–1	12 May 2004	
Gorean Highley	Trinidad and Tobago	W Connection	Tobago United*	1–3	22 July 2004	
Jerren Nixon	Trinidad and Tobago	North East Stars*	South Starworld Strikers	3–2	8 August 2004	
Ashford Legerton	Trinidad and Tobago	Arima Fire	Tobago United*	0–6	1 September 2004	
Marc Borde^{4}	Trinidad and Tobago	South Starworld Strikers*	Tobago United	13–1	18 September 2004	
Peter Prosper	Trinidad and Tobago	South Starworld Strikers	Tobago United*	1–8	6 October 2004	
Titus Elva^{9}	Saint Lucia	W Connection*	Tobago United	17–0	13 October 2004	
Jose Luciano Viera	Brazil	W Connection*	Tobago United	17–0	13 October 2004	
Dwayne Ellis	Trinidad and Tobago	W Connection*	Tobago United	17–0	13 October 2004	
Gefferson	Brazil	W Connection*	North East Stars	4–0	7 April 2005	
Josh Johnson	Trinidad and Tobago	San Juan Jabloteh*	United Petrotrin	4–1	26 April 2005	
Andre Toussaint	Trinidad and Tobago	W Connection*	Tobago United	7–0	30 April 2005	
Kerry Noray	Trinidad and Tobago	San Juan Jabloteh	Defence Force*	0–7	13 June 2005	
Ronaldo Viana	Brazil	W Connection	Defence Force*	1–3	4 October 2005	
Beville Joseph	Trinidad and Tobago	United Petrotrin	W Connection*	1–3	6 November 2005	
Phanor Gonzales	Colombia	Joe Public	Tobago United*	1–7	2 May 2006	
Andre Toussaint	Trinidad and Tobago	W Connection*	Superstar Rangers	5–0	6 May 2006	
Joseph Peters	Trinidad and Tobago	North East Stars*	Tobago United	5–0	3 June 2006	
Anthony Wolfe	Trinidad and Tobago	San Juan Jabloteh	Tobago United*	0–3	13 July 2006	
Anthony Wolfe	Trinidad and Tobago	San Juan Jabloteh*	Superstar Rangers	4–2	15 July 2006	
Matthew Bartholomew	Trinidad and Tobago	W Connection*	United Petrotrin	7–0	12 August 2006	
Oneke Ford^{4}	Jamaica	North East Stars*	South Starworld Strikers	5–0	9 September 2006	
Nigel Codrington	Guyana	Caledonia AIA	Tobago United*	1–5	31 October 2006	
Peter Prosper	Trinidad and Tobago	San Juan Jabloteh*	North East Stars	4–1	2 December 2006	
Kendall Jagdeosingh	Trinidad and Tobago	North East Stars*	Tobago United	4–1	14 April 2007	
Errol McFarlane	Trinidad and Tobago	Superstar Rangers*	Tobago United	5–0	17 April 2007	
Peter Byers	Antigua and Barbuda	San Juan Jabloteh	Tobago United*	1–5	3 July 2007	
Errol McFarlane	Trinidad and Tobago	Superstar Rangers	Police*	3–4	8 July 2007	
Peter Prosper	Trinidad and Tobago	United Petrotrin	Police*	0–5	10 July 2007	
Kayode Legall	Trinidad and Tobago	Tobago United*	Police	6–2	31 July 2007	
Hayden Tinto	Trinidad and Tobago	Caledonia AIA	Tobago United*	1–7	30 October 2007	
Josimar Belgrave^{4}	Trinidad and Tobago	St. Ann's Rangers	Tobago United*	1–5	3 May 2008	
Sean Cooper	Trinidad and Tobago	North East Stars	Ma Pau*	1–4	23 September 2008	
Devorn Jorsling	Trinidad and Tobago	Defence Force	Tobago United*	0–10	23 October 2008	
Roen Nelson	Jamaica	Joe Public*	St. Ann's Rangers	6–0	6 November 2008	
Roen Nelson	Jamaica	Joe Public	Ma Pau*	0–4	11 November 2008	
Kendall Velox	Saint Vincent and the Grenadines	Caledonia AIA	Police*	2–6	23 May 2009	
Keyon Edwards	Trinidad and Tobago	Caledonia AIA	St. Ann's Rangers*	0–6	16 June 2009	
Keyon Edwards	Trinidad and Tobago	Caledonia AIA*	Tobago United	5–3	23 June 2009	
Kerry Baptiste^{5}	Trinidad and Tobago	Joe Public	St. Ann's Rangers*	3–5	21 July 2009	
Kerry Baptiste	Trinidad and Tobago	Joe Public	Defence Force*	4–3	4 August 2009	
Anthony Wolfe	Trinidad and Tobago	Ma Pau*	Caledonia AIA	4–2	14 August 2009	
Aurtis Whitley	Trinidad and Tobago	United Petrotrin	St. Ann's Rangers*	1–4	22 August 2009	
Devorn Jorsling	Trinidad and Tobago	Defence Force	Police*	1–5	22 August 2009	
Devorn Jorsling	Trinidad and Tobago	Defence Force	St. Ann's Rangers*	2–3	28 August 2009	
Kerry Baptiste^{4}	Trinidad and Tobago	Joe Public	Police*	0–7	29 August 2009	
Conrad Smith	Trinidad and Tobago	Joe Public	Police*	0–7	29 August 2009	
Andrei Pacheco	Trinidad and Tobago	W Connection	United Petrotrin*	2–5	29 August 2009	
Jonathan Faña^{4}	Dominican Republic	W Connection*	Police	8–0	4 September 2009	
Alusine Bangura	Sierra Leone	W Connection*	Police	8–0	4 September 2009	
Richard Roy^{4}	Trinidad and Tobago	Defence Force	San Juan Jabloteh*	5–4	15 October 2009	
Noel Williams^{4}	Trinidad and Tobago	San Juan Jabloteh*	Defence Force	5–4	15 October 2009	
Odelle Armstrong	Trinidad and Tobago	St. Ann's Rangers	Police*	2–5	29 May 2010	
Anthony Wolfe	Trinidad and Tobago	North East Stars*	Police	6–3	7 December 2010	
Kerry Baptiste	Trinidad and Tobago	Joe Public*	San Juan Jabloteh	3–1	7 December 2010	
Richard Roy	Trinidad and Tobago	Defence Force	St. Ann's Rangers*	1–3	31 January 2012	
Vurlon Mills	Guyana	T&TEC	Police*	1–6	27 March 2012	
Bevon Bass	Trinidad and Tobago	T&TEC*	St. Ann's Rangers	3–2	20 October 2012	
Josimar Belgrave	Trinidad and Tobago	Defence Force*	North East Stars	3–3	20 October 2012	
Ataullah Guerra	Trinidad and Tobago	Caledonia AIA	T&TEC*	0–6	3 November 2012	
Keyon Edwards	Trinidad and Tobago	Caledonia AIA	Police*	1–5	9 November 2012	
Kevon Carter	Trinidad and Tobago	Defence Force*	St. Ann's Rangers	8–0	4 January 2013	
Shahdon Winchester	Trinidad and Tobago	W Connection	Central FC*	0–3	5 January 2013	
Cornell Glen	Trinidad and Tobago	North East Stars*	T&TEC	3–1	15 February 2013	
Joevin Jones	Trinidad and Tobago	W Connection	Police*	2–5	22 February 2013	
Marvin Lee	Trinidad and Tobago	St. Ann's Rangers	Police*	3–3	27 February 2013	
Peter Byers^{4}	Antigua and Barbuda	Central FC*	T&TEC	5–0	16 March 2013	
Devorn Jorsling	Trinidad and Tobago	Defence Force*	Central FC	3–0	5 April 2013	
Neil Benjamin	Trinidad and Tobago	W Connection*	Defence Force	4–0	6 May 2013	
Andrei Pacheco	Trinidad and Tobago	W Connection	Police*	0–5	10 May 2013	
Kurt Frederick	Saint Lucia	W Connection	St. Ann's Rangers*	0–7	14 September 2013	
Clevon McFee	Trinidad and Tobago	St. Ann's Rangers	San Juan Jabloteh*	6–5	20 September 2013	
Kerry Baptiste	Trinidad and Tobago	San Juan Jabloteh*	St. Ann's Rangers	6–5	20 September 2013	
Trevin Caesar	Trinidad and Tobago	North East Stars	Defence Force*	1–3	8 October 2013	
Rundell Winchester	Trinidad and Tobago	Central FC*	Point Fortin Civic	3–0	22 October 2013	
Keyon Edwards	Trinidad and Tobago	Caledonia AIA	St. Ann's Rangers*	1–6	1 November 2013	
Marcus Joseph	Trinidad and Tobago	Point Fortin Civic*	Police	5–0	18 January 2014	
Marcus Joseph	Trinidad and Tobago	Point Fortin Civic	St. Ann's Rangers*	0–3	21 January 2014	
Willis Plaza	Trinidad and Tobago	Central FC*	St. Ann's Rangers	6–0	21 February 2014	
Dimitrie Apai	Suriname	W Connection*	Police	6–1	8 April 2014	
Willis Plaza	Trinidad and Tobago	Central FC*	Caledonia AIA	5–1	8 April 2014	
Josimar Belgrave	Trinidad and Tobago	Defence Force*	Caledonia AIA	4–0	25 April 2014	
Devorn Jorsling	Trinidad and Tobago	Defence Force*	Police	4–2	4 October 2014	
Pernell Schultz	Guyana	Caledonia AIA	Defence Force*	1–3	4 November 2014	
Marcus Joseph	Trinidad and Tobago	Point Fortin Civic*	Caledonia AIA	6–2	16 January 2015	
Kerry Baptiste	Trinidad and Tobago	San Juan Jabloteh	St. Ann's Rangers*	0–5	23 January 2015	
Devorn Jorsling	Trinidad and Tobago	Defence Force	St. Ann's Rangers*	0–7	27 February 2015	
Devorn Jorsling	Trinidad and Tobago	Defence Force*	Caledonia AIA	4–0	17 March 2015	
Devorn Jorsling	Trinidad and Tobago	Defence Force*	Point Fortin Civic	4–2	12 April 2015	
Jomal Williams	Trinidad and Tobago	W Connection*	St. Ann's Rangers	5–0	12 December 2015	
Jamal Gay	Trinidad and Tobago	San Juan Jabloteh	Club Sando*	0–6	15 December 2015	
Makesi Lewis	Trinidad and Tobago	Police	St. Ann's Rangers*	1–6	16 December 2015	
Devorn Jorsling	Trinidad and Tobago	Defence Force*	North East Stars	6–1	19 December 2015	
Jerwyn Balthazar	Trinidad and Tobago	Defence Force*	Morvant Caledonia United	8–0	9 January 2016	
Jason Marcano	Trinidad and Tobago	Central FC*	Point Fortin Civic	7–0	15 January 2016	
Jerwyn Balthazar^{4}	Trinidad and Tobago	Defence Force*	St. Ann's Rangers	4–0	15 January 2016	
Kareem Freitas	Trinidad and Tobago	Police*	Morvant Caledonia United	5–0	19 January 2016	
Kerry Baptiste	Trinidad and Tobago	North East Stars*	Police	5–2	6 March 2016	

=== Multiple hat-tricks ===
The following table lists the minimum number of hat-tricks scored by players who have scored two or more hat-tricks. The table also features the minimum number of beaver-tricks, four or more goals scored in a match, by each player listed with multiple hat-tricks.

Rank	Player	Hat-tricks	Last hat-trick	Beaver-tricks	Last beaver-trick
1	(Trinidad and Tobago) Devorn Jorsling	9	19 December 2015	0	
2	(Trinidad and Tobago) Kerry Baptiste	8	6 March 2016	2	29 August 2009
3	(Trinidad and Tobago) Keyon Edwards	4	1 November 2013	0	
3	(Trinidad and Tobago) Marcus Joseph	4	16 January 2015	0	
3	(Trinidad and Tobago) Anthony Wolfe	4	7 December 2010	0	
6	(Trinidad and Tobago) Josimar Belgrave	3	25 April 2014	1	3 May 2008
6	(Guyana) Randolph Jerome	3	2 May 2004	0	
6	(Trinidad and Tobago) Jerren Nixon	3	8 August 2004	2	12 May 2004
6	(Trinidad and Tobago) Peter Prosper	3	10 July 2007	0	
10	(Trinidad and Tobago) Jerwyn Balthazar	2	15 January 2016	1	15 January 2016
10	(Antigua and Barbuda) Peter Byers	2	16 March 2013	1	16 March 2013
10	(Trinidad and Tobago) Ashford Legerton	2	1 September 2004	0	
10	(Trinidad and Tobago) Errol McFarlane	2	8 July 2007	0	
10	(Jamaica) Roen Nelson	2	11 November 2008	0	
10	(Trinidad and Tobago) Andrei Pacheco	2	10 May 2013	0	
10	(Trinidad and Tobago) Willis Plaza	2	8 April 2015	0	
10	(Trinidad and Tobago) Richard Roy	2	31 January 2012	1	15 October 2009
10	(Trinidad and Tobago) Jason Scotland	2	13 September 2000	0	
10	(Trinidad and Tobago) Andre Toussaint	2	6 May 2006	0	
10	(Saint Vincent and the Grenadines) Kendall Velox	2	23 May 2009	0	
10	(Trinidad and Tobago) Aurtis Whitley	2	22 August 2009	1	19 April 2004

=== Hat-tricks by club ===
Rank	Club	Total
1	Defence Force	20
1	W Connection	20
3	North East Stars	14
4	San Juan Jabloteh	12
5	Joe Public	11
6	Morvant Caledonia United	9
7	St. Ann's Rangers	6
8	Central FC	4
8	South Starworld Strikers	4
10	Arima Fire	3
10	Point Fortin Civic	3
10	United Petrotrin	3
13	Police	2
13	T&TEC	2
15	Ma Pau	1
15	Tobago United	1
Total		115

=== Hat-tricks by nationality ===
Rank	Country	Total
1	Trinidad and Tobago	91
2	Guyana	7
3	Brazil	4
4	Jamaica	3
5	Antigua and Barbuda	2
5	Saint Lucia	2
5	Saint Vincent and the Grenadines	2
8	Colombia	1
8	Dominican Republic	1
8	Sierra Leone	1
8	Suriname	1
Total		115

== See also ==
- Top TT Pro League goal scorers by season
- TT Pro League Golden Boot
