= List of TT Pro League seasons =

Digicel Pro League
- Founded: 5 January 1999; 27 years ago (as Professional Football League) (1999–2001)
- First season: 1999
- Country: Trinidad and Tobago
- Confederation: CONCACAF
- Number of clubs: 10
- Level on pyramid: 1
- Relegation to: None
- International cup(s): CONCACAF Champions League; CFU Club Championship
- Current champions: Central FC (2015–16, 2nd title)
- Most championships: W Connection (5 titles)
- Top scorer: Devorn Jorsling (144 goals)
- Current: 2016–17 TT Pro League

The TT Pro League (formerly known as the Professional Football League) is the Trinidad and Tobago professional league for association football clubs. The league serves as the top division in the Trinidad and Tobago football league system and is the country's primary football competition. Contested by ten clubs, the league is one of the world's few football leagues that do not operate on an automatic system of promotion and relegation. Seasons run from September to May, with teams playing 27 games each, totaling 135 games in the season. Most games are played in the evenings of Fridays (Super Fridays) and Saturdays (Fiesta Saturdays), with a few games played during weekday evenings. The Pro League headquarters is located in northwest of Trinidad and Tobago in St. Augustine. The league is currently sponsored by Digicel and thus officially known as the Digicel Pro League.

The Professional Football League, forerunner to the current TT Pro League, was inaugurated on 5 January 1999 as part of a need for a professional league to strengthen the country's national team and improve the development of domestic players. The league lasted three years until a decision by club owners in March 2002 to cease league operations of the Professional Football League. Consequently, the TT Pro League was born as the country's new professional league operating as a corporation owned by the member clubs. Teams competing in the Pro League may qualify for the CFU Club Championship by virtue of league positions. In addition, the top three Caribbean clubs enter the group stage of the CONCACAF Champions League. There is no automatic promotion to the Pro League from the country's second-tier National Super League. The league's club members vote to determine which, if any, applications for admission into the league will be permitted. Preference is given to the Super League champion. Since the inaugural season in 1999, 22 distinct teams have competed in the Pro League.

Six clubs have won the title: W Connection (5 times), San Juan Jabloteh (4), Defence Force (3), Central FC (2), Joe Public (2), and North East Stars (1) with W Connection being the first team to win consecutive titles (2000 to 2001). The record number of points accumulated by a team is 92 over 36 games by San Juan Jabloteh, who won the Pro League in 2003–04. At the other end of the scale, Tobago United remains the only club to have lost every game in a season during 2004. Tobago United also holds the record for the fewest goals scored in a season, having scored just 13 in the same season. San Juan Jabloteh hold the record for the most goals scored, with 113 during the 2003–04 season. Fourteen top goalscorers from seven different teams have been awarded the Golden Boot. Arnold Dwarika scored 45 goals in a 28-game season – the most in a Pro League season, while Jerren Nixon scored 37 in a 26-game season in 2004. Randolph Jerome was the first international player to win the award in 2003–04 having scored 28 goals in 36 matches.

== History ==
=== Champions ===
In the inaugural season of the Professional Football League, Defence Force continued a theme set in the 1970s, 1980s, and early 1990s, which saw the club win a record twentieth league championship. W Connection earned the club's first two titles when the Savonetta Boys won the league in consecutive years in 2000 and 2001. In fact, W Connection became the first Pro League club to complete the league and cup double in 2000. However, San Juan Jabloteh ended the possibility of a three-peat when the club finished three points clear of W Connection to win their first league championship in 2002. Jabloteh successfully retained the title in 2003–04, having finished 12 points ahead of W Connection in the second successive season. North East Stars ended the San Juan Kings' Pro League reign having finished top during the regular season and gained enough points during the Pro League's inaugural Big Six competition to secure the club's first championship in 2004. After finishing second in three consecutive seasons, W Connection won its third Pro League title in 2005 by finishing 15 points clear of San Juan Jabloteh. The 2006 season saw the closest finish in Pro League history with Joe Public claiming the title by superior goal difference over W Connection after the two teams ended equal on points. The league championship title came down to the last match day of the season. W Connection needed a win by at least three goals against Joe Public to win the championship. However, with a 3–1 victory to W Connection the title went to the Eastern Lions. The championship marked Joe Public's first Pro League title and second league championship overall.

San Juan Jabloteh reclaimed the Pro League title in 2007 after finishing first following the regular season by one point over Caledonia AIA. The Men from Morvant only earned one point during the Pro League Big Six to give the San Juan Kings a five-point title win. In 2008, San Juan Jabloteh and W Connection ran away with the regular season having finished 20 points clear of third place level at 61. Jabloteh and W Connection drew 0–0 in the final round of the Big Six competition to give Jabloteh their second consecutive title finishing two points ahead of W Connection in the final league table. Joe Public became the second Pro League club to complete the double in 2009, beating W Connection 3–2 in the 2009 FA Trophy final.

On 25 March 2010, TT Pro League CEO Dexter Skeene announced that the Pro League Big Six competition was to be discontinued to increase attendances and importance of league matches, which would be moved exclusively to Fridays and Saturdays. Furthermore, it was announced that by aligning Pro League seasons with those of the major leagues in Europe, the Pro League would afford the opportunity to further link culture with sport to harness and develop the talent of people in Trinidad and Tobago. During the 2010–11 season, Defence Force won its first ten league matches en route to their second Pro League title and twenty-first league championship. W Connection used a crushing 8–1 win over Police on the final match day of the 2011–12 season to claim their fourth Pro League title finishing one point clear of Pro League newcomer T&TEC. Defence Force earned their second Pro League championship in three seasons and their third overall after securing the 2012–13 title. The following season, W Connection completed the club's second double with an emphatic 4–1 win over defending champions Defence Force in their next to last match. The win marked the Savonetta Boys' fifth Pro League championship, which is the most for any club during the 15 years of the Pro League.

=== Expansion and contraction ===
Point Fortin Civic became the first club to be expelled from the Pro League after six players appeared for a match late in the inaugural season. Following the season, FUTGOF were also excluded since the club could not continue to maintain the standards set by the Professional Football League. Caledonia AIA and Arima Fire replaced the two clubs the following season. Prior to the 2002 season, Doc's Khelwalaas and Police did not follow the remaining six clubs into the newly established TT Pro League. As a result, two expansion clubs, North East Stars and South Starworld Strikers, were admitted to maintain league membership at eight.

No team was contracted from the TT Pro League after the league campaign in 2002. However, both South West Institute of Football based in Palo Seco and Tobago United from the sister isle of Tobago joined the league the following year. Joe Public were the first league champion to withdraw from the Pro League following the 2003–04 season. Although the club finished fifth in the table, the Eastern Lions withdrew from the league citing financial difficulties. South Starworld Strikers joined Joe Public a year later outside the top flight stating that the club would return after a year to resolve its financial obligations. Following the 2005 season, South Starworld Strikers returned to the Pro League alongside newly admitted Joe Public and Superstar Rangers from the National Super League. Rangers became the first club that were invited for admission into the Pro League from the second-tier of the league system. The 2006 season would again see South Starworld Strikers withdraw from the league. With the Strikers' departure the club became the first in the Pro League to withdraw from the league twice. However, with the inclusion of Police the league remained with ten clubs for 2007. This marked the first return to professional football for Police since 2001.

Following the 2007 season, Police withdrew from the league again as a result of commissioner Trevor Paul's directive to ban lawmen from participating in sporting activities. Ma Pau became the next club to be admitted into the Pro League prior to the 2008 season. North East Stars withdrew from the Pro League following the season, citing the state of their home ground, Sangre Grande Recreational Ground, for the past few years as the cause to sit out the 2009 season. Police were readmitted into the league following a one-year absence, whereas FC South End were admitted as a new club to replace North East Stars. With an 8–0 loss to W Connection on 1 September 2009, Police became the first club in seven years besides Tobago United to finish bottom in the league. The club had a disappointing campaign having only recorded nine points with a -48 goal difference. On 8 January 2010, United Petrotrin announced that they had pulled the club from the Pro League.

Starting lineup for Central FC, in their inaugural season, facing Defence Force in a league match on 9 November 2012

North East Stars were readmitted into the Pro League for the 2010–11 campaign following their one-year absence due to the state of their home ground. In spite of maintaining its largest participation with 11 clubs competing for the second consecutive year, the league season was delayed for a month for rescheduling after Tobago United were expelled from the Pro League, leaving 10 teams. Moreover, after the season had been concluded, CEO Dexter Skeene announced that Joe Public, Ma Pau, and FC South End would not be participating in the 2011–12 season. This resulted in 2010–11 becoming the first season three clubs withdrew from the Pro League. Following a runners-up finish in 2009 and being crowned champions in the 2010 seasons, respectively, T&TEC became the third club to gain promotion from the National Super League on 1 March 2011. Two months before the start of the 2012–13 season, Jabloteh announced that it had suspended its football club operations and would not be participating in the league season. Central FC, a new club established by Brent Sancho to represent the Central region of the country, was formed, officially applied, and were admitted into the Pro League on 6 September 2012.

After the 2012–13 season, however, T&TEC became the seventh team to withdraw from the league during a four-year period. The club cited that their financial struggles to support professional football contributed to their withdrawal. In response, the Pro League re-admitted Point Fortin Civic and San Juan Jabloteh on 10 September 2013 to increase league membership to nine. One season after having its application for membership rejected after failing to meet the league's financial requirements, Club Sando was admitted as the 22nd distinct club to enter the Pro League prior to the 2015–16 season.

=== Top goalscorer ===
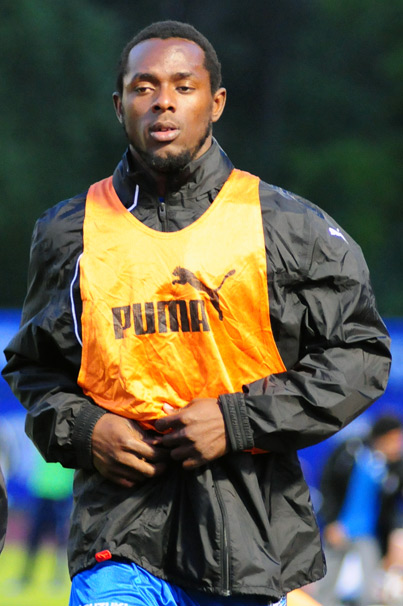
Peter Byers became the fifth foreign player to win the Golden Boot in 2007

The top goalscorer in the TT Pro League at the end of each season is awarded the Golden Boot. The first recipient was Arnold Dwarika of Joe Public, who scored a league record 45 goals in 28 games during the league's inaugural season. Jason Scotland became the second Trinidadian to claim the award with 22 goals for Defence Force in 2000. Due to a shortened league season, the Golden Boot winner for the 2001 season is unknown. Sean Julien of South Starworld Strikers scored 16 goals in 28 games for the club in 2002 to win the award. In the 2003–04 season, Randolph Jerome (Guyana) of North East Stars became the first foreign player to win the Golden Boot with 28 goals from 36 games. Jerren Nixon scored an impressive 37 goals in 26 matches in 2004 to help North East Stars to their first Pro League title. Gefferson and Earl Jean both of W Connection were the joint recipients of the Golden Boot the following season, with 14 goals apiece. In 2006, the award was again shared between Roen Nelson and Anthony Wolfe of Joe Public and San Juan Jabloteh, respectively, with both scorers finishing with 16 goals in 32 appearances.

In 2007, the award was given to Antiguan Peter Byers of San Juan Jabloteh, scoring 15 goals in 32 matches. Devorn Jorsling of Defence Force picked up the prize a year later with 21 goals in 27 league matches. During the 2009 season, Kerry Baptiste scored 35 goals in 25 games, including three hat-tricks to give his side Joe Public their second Pro League title. Jorsling became the first player to win the Golden Boot twice after scoring 15 goals for Defence Force on their way to becoming league champions in 2010–11. Richard Roy of Defence Force was the recipient in 2011–12 with 15 goals from 21 matches. Jorsling claimed an unprecedented third Golden Boot award following the 2012–13 season after recording 21 goals from 21 matches for Defence Force. In 2013–14, Marcus Joseph scored 16 goals to secure his first Golden Boot and propel Point Fortin Civic to a fourth-place finish in the club's first year back in the Pro League.

Devorn Jorsling continued the theme of winning the Pro League Golden Boot every other season after scoring 21 goals in 24 matches for the Teteron Boys during the 2014–15 season.

== Seasons ==
Key
**Bold**	League champions won domestic double
Italics	League champions won continental treble

Season	Champions (number of titles)	Caribbean Club Championship	Withdrew from the TT Pro League	Admitted to the TT Pro League	Top goalscorer	
Season	Champions (number of titles)	Caribbean Club Championship	Withdrew from the TT Pro League	Admitted to the TT Pro League	Player(s)	Goals
1999	Defence Force	W Connection	FUTGOF; Point Fortin Civic	Arima Fire; Caledonia AIA	(Trinidad and Tobago) Arnold Dwarika (Joe Public)	45
2000	**W Connection**	Defence Force			(Trinidad and Tobago) Jason Scotland (Defence Force)	22
2001	W Connection (2)		Doc's Khelwalaas; Police	North East Stars; South Starworld Strikers	Unknown	
2002	San Juan Jabloteh	W Connection		South West Institute of Football; Tobago United	(Trinidad and Tobago) Sean Julien (South Starworld Strikers)	16
2003–04	San Juan Jabloteh (2)		Joe Public		(Guyana) Randolph Jerome (North East Stars)	28
2004	North East Stars		South Starworld Strikers		(Trinidad and Tobago) Jerren Nixon (North East Stars)	37
2005	W Connection (3)	San Juan Jabloteh		Joe Public; South Starworld Strikers; Superstar Rangers	(Brazil) Gefferson (W Connection)	14
2005	W Connection (3)	San Juan Jabloteh		Joe Public; South Starworld Strikers; Superstar Rangers	(Saint Lucia) Earl Jean (W Connection)	14
2006	Joe Public	San Juan Jabloteh	South Starworld Strikers	Police	(Jamaica) Roen Nelson (Joe Public)	16
2006	Joe Public	San Juan Jabloteh	South Starworld Strikers	Police	(Trinidad and Tobago) Anthony Wolfe (San Juan Jabloteh)	16
2007	San Juan Jabloteh (3)	Joe Public	Police	Ma Pau	(Antigua and Barbuda) Peter Byers (San Juan Jabloteh)	15
2008	San Juan Jabloteh (4)	W Connection	North East Stars	Police; FC South End	(Trinidad and Tobago) Devorn Jorsling (Defence Force)	21
2009	**Joe Public** (2)	San Juan Jabloteh	United Petrotrin	North East Stars	(Trinidad and Tobago) Kerry Baptiste (Joe Public)	35
2010–11	Defence Force (2)	Caledonia AIA	Joe Public; Ma Pau; FC South End; Tobago United	T&TEC	(Trinidad and Tobago) Devorn Jorsling (Defence Force)	15
2011–12	W Connection (4)	Caledonia AIA	San Juan Jabloteh	Central FC	(Trinidad and Tobago) Richard Roy (Defence Force)	15
2012–13	Defence Force (3)	Caledonia AIA	T&TEC	Point Fortin Civic; San Juan Jabloteh	(Trinidad and Tobago) Devorn Jorsling (Defence Force)	21
2013–14	**W Connection** (5)	Central FC			(Trinidad and Tobago) Marcus Joseph (Point Fortin Civic)	16
2014–15	Central FC	W Connection		Club Sando	(Trinidad and Tobago) Devorn Jorsling (Defence Force)	21
2015–16	Central FC (2)	San Juan Jabloteh			(Trinidad and Tobago) Makesi Lewis (Police)	21

== See also ==
- List of Trinidad and Tobago football champions
