= TT Pro League awards =

The TT Pro League awards is an annual awards ceremony commemorating football-related people, given at the conclusion of each TT Pro League season since its inauguration in 1999. The ceremony is held prior to the opening match of the following Pro League season. In addition to the annual Golden Boot recipient, the awards ceremony honours the Player, Manager, Referee, Assistant Referee, and Match Commissioner of the previous season. Beginning in 2005, the Pro League has also recognised the best position players of each season. The individual recipients are awarded Best Goalkeeper, Defender, Midfielder, and Forward. There are only two team award recipients each year: Best Team and Most Disciplined Team of the Year.

== Award winners ==
1999 awards
Award	Winner
Player of the Year	(Trinidad and Tobago) Arnold Dwarika (Joe Public)
Manager of the Year	Unknown
Golden Boot	(Trinidad and Tobago) Arnold Dwarika (Joe Public)
Team of the Year	Joe Public
Most Disciplined Team of the Year	W Connection
Referee of the Year	Ramesh Ramdhan
Assistant Referee of the Year	Haseeb Mohammed
Match Commissioner of the Year	Unknown

2000 awards
Award	Winner
Player of the Year	(Trinidad and Tobago) Reynold Carrington (W Connection)
Manager of the Year	(Saint Lucia) Stuart Charles-Fevrier (W Connection)
Golden Boot	(Trinidad and Tobago) Jason Scotland (Defence Force)
Team of the Year	W Connection
Most Disciplined Team of the Year	W Connection
Referee of the Year	Noel Bynoe
Assistant Referee of the Year	Michael Ragoonath
Match Commissioner of the Year	Norris Ferguson

2001 awards
Award	Winner
Player of the Year	Unknown
Manager of the Year	(Saint Lucia) Stuart Charles-Fevrier (W Connection)
Golden Boot	Unknown
Team of the Year	Unknown
Most Disciplined Team of the Year	Unknown
Referee of the Year	Unknown
Assistant Referee of the Year	Unknown
Match Commissioner of the Year	Unknown

2002 awards
Award	Winner
Player of the Year	(Trinidad and Tobago) Andre Toussaint (Joe Public)
Manager of the Year	(Saint Lucia) Stuart Charles-Fevrier (W Connection)
Golden Boot	(Trinidad and Tobago) Sean Julien (South Starworld Strikers)
Team of the Year	W Connection
Most Disciplined Team of the Year	South Starworld Strikers
Referee of the Year	Unknown
Assistant Referee of the Year	Unknown
Match Commissioner of the Year	Unknown

2003–04 awards
Award	Winner
Player of the Year	(Guyana) Charles Pollard (North East Stars)
Manager of the Year	(England) Ricky Hill (San Juan Jabloteh)
Golden Boot	(Guyana) Randolph Jerome (North East Stars)
Team of the Year	North East Stars
Most Disciplined Team of the Year	Unknown
Referee of the Year	Unknown
Assistant Referee of the Year	Unknown
Match Commissioner of the Year	Unknown

2004 awards
Award	Winner
Player of the Year	(Trinidad and Tobago) Jerren Nixon (North East Stars)
Manager of the Year	(Guyana) James McLean (North East Stars)
Golden Boot	(Trinidad and Tobago) Jerren Nixon (North East Stars)
Team of the Year	W Connection
Most Disciplined Team of the Year	Tobago United
Referee of the Year	Unknown
Assistant Referee of the Year	Unknown
Match Commissioner of the Year	Unknown

2005 awards
Award	Winner
Player of the Year	(Brazil) Gefferson (W Connection)
Manager of the Year	(Trinidad and Tobago) Brian Williams (United Petrotrin)
Golden Boot	(Brazil) Gefferson (W Connection)
Golden Boot	(Saint Lucia) Earl Jean (W Connection)
Team of the Year	W Connection
Most Disciplined Team of the Year	W Connection
Referee of the Year	Neal Brizan
Assistant Referee of the Year	Joseph Taylor
Match Commissioner of the Year	Wayne Caesar

2006 awards
Award	Winner
Player of the Year	(Trinidad and Tobago) Jan-Michael Williams (W Connection)
Manager of the Year	(Trinidad and Tobago) Michael McComie (Joe Public)
Best Goalkeeper	(Trinidad and Tobago) Jan-Michael Williams (W Connection)
Best Defender	(Saint Lucia) Sheldon Emmanuel (Caledonia AIA)
Best Midfielder	(Brazil) William Oliveira (W Connection)
Best Forward	(Jamaica) Roen Nelson (Joe Public)
Golden Boot	(Jamaica) Roen Nelson (Joe Public)
Golden Boot	(Trinidad and Tobago) Anthony Wolfe (San Juan Jabloteh)
Team of the Year	San Juan Jabloteh
Most Disciplined Team of the Year	W Connection
Referee of the Year	Shane de Silva
Assistant Referee of the Year	Lyndon Burton
Match Commissioner of the Year	Wayne Caesar

2007 awards
Award	Winner
Player of the Year	(Trinidad and Tobago) Marvin Oliver (Caledonia AIA)
Manager of the Year	(Saint Lucia) Stuart Charles-Fevrier (W Connection)
Best Goalkeeper	(Trinidad and Tobago) Cleon John (San Juan Jabloteh)
Best Defender	(Saint Lucia) Elijah Joseph (W Connection)
Best Midfielder	(Trinidad and Tobago) Marvin Oliver (Caledonia AIA)
Best Forward	(Antigua and Barbuda) Peter Byers (San Juan Jabloteh)
Golden Boot	(Antigua and Barbuda) Peter Byers (San Juan Jabloteh)
Team of the Year	W Connection
Most Disciplined Team of the Year	W Connection
Referee of the Year	Neal Brizan
Assistant Referee of the Year	Joseph Taylor
Match Commissioner of the Year	Norris Ferguson

2008 awards
Award	Winner
Player of the Year	(Trinidad and Tobago) Trent Noel (San Juan Jabloteh)
Manager of the Year	(England) Terry Fenwick (San Juan Jabloteh)
Golden Boot	(Trinidad and Tobago) Devorn Jorsling (Defence Force)
Team of the Year	San Juan Jabloteh
Most Disciplined Team of the Year	North East Stars
Referee of the Year	Neal Brizan
Assistant Referee of the Year	Joseph Pierre
Match Commissioner of the Year	Boris Punch

2009 awards
Award	Winner
Player of the Year	(Trinidad and Tobago) Kerry Baptiste (Joe Public)
Manager of the Year	(Trinidad and Tobago) Derek King (Joe Public)
Best Goalkeeper	(Colombia) Alejandro Figueroa (Joe Public)
Best Defender	(Trinidad and Tobago) Keyeno Thomas (Joe Public)
Best Midfielder	(Trinidad and Tobago) Trent Noel (Joe Public)
Best Forward	(Trinidad and Tobago) Kerry Baptiste (Joe Public)
Golden Boot	(Trinidad and Tobago) Kerry Baptiste (Joe Public)
Team of the Year	Joe Public
Most Disciplined Team of the Year	Caledonia AIA
Referee of the Year	Neal Brizan
Assistant Referee of the Year	Ainsley Rochard
Match Commissioner of the Year	Boris Punch

2010–11 awards
Award	Winner
Player of the Year	(Trinidad and Tobago) Devorn Jorsling (Defence Force)
Manager of the Year	(Trinidad and Tobago) Ross Russell (Defence Force)
Best Goalkeeper	(Trinidad and Tobago) Cleon John (San Juan Jabloteh)
Best Defender	(Trinidad and Tobago) Corneal Thomas (Ma Pau)
Best Midfielder	(Trinidad and Tobago) Trent Noel (Joe Public)
Best Forward	(Trinidad and Tobago) Devorn Jorsling (Defence Force)
Golden Boot	(Trinidad and Tobago) Devorn Jorsling (Defence Force)
Team of the Year	Defence Force
Most Disciplined Team of the Year	St. Ann's Rangers
Referee of the Year	Neal Brizan
Assistant Referee of the Year	Dion Neil
Match Commissioner of the Year	Norris Ferguson

2011–12 awards
Award	Winner
Player of the Year	(Trinidad and Tobago) Richard Roy (Defence Force)
Manager of the Year	(Trinidad and Tobago) Jamaal Shabazz (Caledonia AIA)
Best Goalkeeper	(Trinidad and Tobago) Jan-Michael Williams (W Connection)
Best Defender	(Trinidad and Tobago) Nuru Abdullah Muhammad (Caledonia AIA)
Best Midfielder	(Trinidad and Tobago) Ataullah Guerra (Caledonia AIA)
Best Forward	(Trinidad and Tobago) Richard Roy (Defence Force)
Golden Boot	(Trinidad and Tobago) Richard Roy (Defence Force)
Team of the Year	Caledonia AIA
Most Disciplined Team of the Year	W Connection
Referee of the Year	Neal Brizan
Assistant Referee of the Year	Cindy Mohammed
Match Commissioner of the Year	Boris Punch

== Awards by club ==
Rank	Club	Total
1	W Connection	24
2	Joe Public	16
3	Defence Force	10
3	San Juan Jabloteh	10
5	Morvant Caledonia United	8
6	North East Stars	7
7	South Starworld Strikers	2
8	Ma Pau	1
8	St. Ann's Rangers	1
8	Tobago United	1
8	United Petrotrin	1
Total		81

== See also ==
- TT Pro League Golden Boot
- List of TT Pro League seasons
