= TT Pro League Golden Boot =

Annual association football award

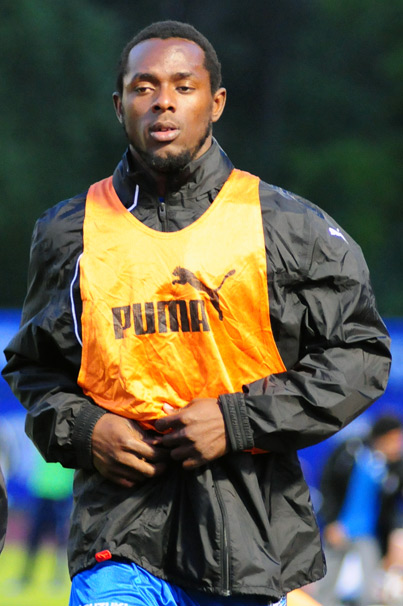
Peter Byers is the most recent foreign player to win the Golden Boot in 2007 with San Juan Jabloteh

The TT Pro League Golden Boot is an annual Trinidad and Tobago football award given at the beginning of each TT Pro League calendar year to the top goalscorer for the previous season. The Golden Boot has been awarded since the establishment of the Pro League in 1999. The top-scoring Pro League Golden Boot winner is Arnold Dwarika with 45 goals in 28 games during the league's inaugural season. Devorn Jorsling has won the award the most times (4) having scored the most league goals during the 2008, 2010–11, 2012–13, and 2014–15 seasons, all when playing for the Teteron Boys of Defence Force. Jorsling remains the only player to have won the Golden Boot on more than one occasion with his most successful campaigns in 2008, 2012–13, and 2014–15 after leading the league with 21 goals each season.

There have been 15 players from eight different clubs that have won the Golden Boot. The award has gone to a single player each season, with the exception of two seasons. The first occurrence came in 2005, after W Connection's Gefferson and Earl Jean shared the award with 14 goals each. After scoring 16 goals apiece, Roen Nelson of Joe Public shared the award with San Juan Jabloteh's Anthony Wolfe the following season. The Golden Boot winner has played for Defence Force during their award-winning season six times, which is the most of any club in the TT Pro League. Joe Public and San Juan Jabloteh are second with three players each claiming the Golden Boot.

Players from five nations, other than Trinidad and Tobago, have won the Golden Boot including Guyana (Randolph Jerome, 2003–04), Brazil (Gefferson, 2005), Saint Lucia (Earl Jean, 2005), Jamaica (Roen Nelson, 2006), and Antigua and Barbuda (Peter Byers, 2007). Although there has been an increasing presence of foreign players in the Pro League, there has not been a foreign-born player to win the Golden Boot since 2008. Since the 2009 season, Trinidad and Tobago international players Kerry Baptiste, Marcus Joseph, Devorn Jorsling, and Richard Roy have won the award.

Although Arnold Dwarika has the highest number of goals scored to win the Golden Boot with 45, Jerren Nixon has the highest strike rate of 1.76 (37 goals in 21 games) in winning the Golden Boot during North East Stars' championship winning season in 2004. Every winner of the Golden Boot has thus far recorded an average strike rate of at least two goals every three matches, and scored a minimum of 14 goals. In fact, combining the statistics for all winners, a Pro League Golden Boot winner scores an average of 20 goals from 24 games, a strike rate of around 0.83 goals per appearance. The Golden Boot winner has helped his respective team to the TT Pro League championship eight years during the award-winning season.

== Winners ==
Key
Games	Number of TT Pro League games played by the winner that season
Rate	Winner's goals-to-games ratio that season
†	Indicates multiple award winners in the same season
‡	Denotes the club were TT Pro League champions in the same season

Season	Winner (number of times)	Nationality	Club	Goals	Games	Rate
1999	Arnold Dwarika	Trinidad and Tobago	Joe Public	45	28	1.61
2000	Jason Scotland	Trinidad and Tobago	Defence Force	22	28	0.79
2001	Unknown				14	
2002	Sean Julien	Trinidad and Tobago	South Starworld Strikers	16	28	0.57
2003–04	Randolph Jerome	Guyana	North East Stars	28	36	0.78
2004	Jerren Nixon	Trinidad and Tobago	North East Stars^{‡}	37	21	1.76
2005^{†}	Gefferson	Brazil	W Connection^{‡}	14	23	0.61
2005^{†}	Earl Jean	Saint Lucia	W Connection^{‡}	14	23	0.61
2006^{†}	Roen Nelson	Jamaica	Joe Public^{‡}	16	32	0.50
2006^{†}	Anthony Wolfe	Trinidad and Tobago	San Juan Jabloteh	16	32	0.50
2007	Peter Byers	Antigua and Barbuda	San Juan Jabloteh^{‡}	15	32	0.47
2008	Devorn Jorsling	Trinidad and Tobago	Defence Force	21	27	0.78
2009	Kerry Baptiste	Trinidad and Tobago	Joe Public^{‡}	35	25	1.40
2010–11	Devorn Jorsling (2)	Trinidad and Tobago	Defence Force^{‡}	15	18	0.83
2011–12	Richard Roy	Trinidad and Tobago	Defence Force	15	21	0.71
2012–13	Devorn Jorsling (3)	Trinidad and Tobago	Defence Force^{‡}	21	21	1.00
2013–14	Marcus Joseph	Trinidad and Tobago	Point Fortin Civic	16	24	0.67
2014–15	Devorn Jorsling (4)	Trinidad and Tobago	Defence Force	21	24	0.88
2015–16	Makesi Lewis	Trinidad and Tobago	Police	21	27	0.78

=== Multiple winners ===
Devorn Jorsling is currently the only player who has been able to win the TT Pro League Golden Boot multiple times with four. Thus, he became the first to win four Golden Boots in 2008, 2010–11, 2012–13, and 2014–15. No player has won the award in consecutive years.

Rank	Player	Total	Seasons
1	(Trinidad and Tobago) Devorn Jorsling	4	2008, 2010–11, 2012–13, 2014–15

=== Awards won by club ===
Rank	Club	Total
1	Defence Force	6
2	Joe Public	3
2	San Juan Jabloteh	3
4	W Connection	2
5	North East Stars	1
5	Point Fortin Civic	1
5	Police	1
5	South Starworld Strikers	1
Total		18

=== Awards won by nationality ===
Rank	Country	Total
1	Trinidad and Tobago	13
2	Antigua and Barbuda	1
2	Brazil	1
2	Guyana	1
2	Jamaica	1
2	Saint Lucia	1
Total		18

== See also ==
- TT Pro League awards
- Top TT Pro League goal scorers by season
- List of TT Pro League seasons
