= 2015–16 TT Pro League =

TT Pro League
- Season: 2015–16
- Champions: Central FC; 2nd Pro League title 2nd T&T title
- CFU Club Championship: Central FC; San Juan Jabloteh
- Matches played: 135
- Goals scored: 444 (3.29 per match)
- Top goalscorer: Makesi Lewis (21 goals)
- Biggest home win: Defence Force 8-0 Caledonia (9 January 2016)
- Biggest away win: North East Stars 0-7 W Connection (31 January 2016)
- Highest scoring: North East Stars 4-4 Police (20 October 2015); Defence Force 8-0 Caledonia (9 January 2016); Club Sando 3-5 Police (19 April 2016)

The 2015–16 TT Pro League season (known as the Digicel Pro League for sponsorship reasons) is the seventeenth season of the TT Pro League, the Trinidad and Tobago professional league for association football clubs, since its establishment in 1999. A total of ten teams are contesting the league, with Central FC the defending champions from the 2014–15 season. The season began on 25 September 2015 and concluded on 21 May 2016 with the crowning of Central FC as the league champion.

The first goal of the season was scored by North East Stars' Alonzo Adlam against new team Club Sando in the seventeenth minute of the first round of matches on 25 September 2015. The first hat-trick of the season was recorded on 12 December 2015 by Jomal Williams of W Connection against St. Ann's Rangers in a 5–0 shutout at Ato Boldon Stadium.

== Changes from the 2014–15 season ==
The following changes were made since the 2014–15 season:

- Dexter Skeene, Pro League CEO, announced that the prize structure would be TT$1 million awarded to the Pro League champions and TT$150,000 to the league runners-up.
  - The winning club of each of the three rounds in the league will also receive TT$50,000.
  - In each of the three rounds, the top player will also receive TT$10,000.
  - The three rounds will be renamed in honour of former Pro League players who lost their lives in the previous three years – Round 1: Raul Fletcher (Police); Round 2: Akeem Adams (Central FC); and Round 3: Kevon Carter (Defence Force).
- There were a number of changes to the clubs competing in the 2014–15 season.
  - Caledonia AIA changed the name of the club to Morvant Caledonia United.
  - An application from Club Sando for Pro League membership was accepted to add the tenth club to the league.

== Teams ==
=== Team summaries ===
Location of the 2015–16 TT Pro League teams

Note: Flags indicate national team as has been defined under FIFA eligibility rules. Players may hold more than one non-FIFA nationality.

Team	Location	Stadium	Capacity	Manager	Captain
Central FC	California	Ato Boldon Stadium	10,000	(Serbia) Zoran Vraneš	(Trinidad and Tobago) Marvin Oliver
Club Sando	San Fernando	Mahaica Oval Pavilion	2,500	(Trinidad and Tobago) Anthony Streete	(Trinidad and Tobago) Teba McKnight
Defence Force	Chaguaramas	Hasely Crawford Stadium	27,000	(Trinidad and Tobago) Ross Russell	(Trinidad and Tobago) Corey Rivers
Morvant Caledonia United	Morvant/Laventille	Larry Gomes Stadium	10,000	(Trinidad and Tobago) Jamaal Shabazz	(Trinidad and Tobago) Stephan David
North East Stars	Sangre Grande	Sangre Grande Regional Complex	7,100	(Trinidad and Tobago) Angus Eve	(Trinidad and Tobago) Cleon John
Point Fortin Civic	Point Fortin	Mahaica Oval Pavilion	2,500	(Trinidad and Tobago) Reynold Carrington	(Trinidad and Tobago) Kelvin Modeste
Police	Saint James	Manny Ramjohn Stadium	10,000	(Trinidad and Tobago) Richard Hood	(Trinidad and Tobago) Trent Noel
San Juan Jabloteh	San Juan	Hasely Crawford Stadium	27,000	(Trinidad and Tobago) Keith Jeffrey	(Jamaica) Damion Williams
St. Ann's Rangers	San Juan	Hasely Crawford Stadium	27,000	(Trinidad and Tobago) Jason Spence	(Trinidad and Tobago) Terrence Lewis
W Connection	Point Lisas	Manny Ramjohn Stadium	10,000	(Saint Lucia) Stuart Charles-Fevrier	(Saint Kitts and Nevis) Gerard Williams

== Stadiums ==
Place	Stadium	Times used
1	Ato Boldon Stadium	52
2	Hasely Crawford Stadium	28
3	Larry Gomes Stadium	26
4	Mahaica Oval	14
5	Mannie Ramjohn Stadium	7
6	Marvin Lee Stadium	4
7	Barataria Recreational Ground	3
8	Guayaguayare Recreational Ground	1

== League table ==
Pos	Team	Pld	W	D	L	GF	GA	GD	Pts	Qualification
1	Central (C, Q)	27	18	4	5	68	20	+48	58	2017 CFU Club Championship First Round
2	San Juan Jabloteh (Q)	27	17	3	7	51	36	+15	54	2017 CFU Club Championship First Round
3	Defence Force	27	14	7	6	54	23	+31	49	
4	W Connection	27	14	7	6	54	25	+29	49	
5	North East Stars	27	13	5	9	42	49	−7	44	
6	Police	27	12	4	11	57	56	+1	40	
7	Club Sando	27	9	3	15	36	57	−21	30	
8	Point Fortin Civic	27	6	4	17	28	56	−28	22	
9	Morvant Caledonia United	27	6	4	17	28	57	−29	22	
10	St. Ann's Rangers	27	3	5	19	26	65	−39	14	

Updated to match(es) played on 22 May 2016. Source: TT Pro League
Rules for classification: 1) points; 2) goal difference; 3) number of goals scored.
(C) Champions; (Q) Qualified for the phase indicated

=== Positions by round ===
Leader
2017 CFU Club Championship First round

The table lists the positions of teams after each week of matches. In order to preserve chronological evolvements, any postponed matches are not included to the round at which they were originally scheduled, but added to the full round they were played immediately afterwards. For example, if a match is scheduled for the tenth round of matches, but then postponed and played between rounds 16 and 17, it will be added to the standings for round 16.

Team ╲ Round	1	2	3	4	5	6	7	8	9	10	11	12	13	14	15	16	17	18	19	20	21	22	23	24	25	26	27
Central FC	1	1	1	3	2	2	5	3	3	2	2	2	2	2	2	1	1	1	1	1	1	1	1	1	1	1	1
San Juan Jabloteh	3	4	7	7	5	4	2	5	4	4	6	6	6	6	4	5	5	4	4	4	4	4	4	2	2	2	2
Defence Force	4	6	4	2	1	1	1	1	1	1	1	1	1	1	1	2	3	2	2	2	3	2	3	4	4	3	3
W Connection	7	8	6	6	4	3	6	4	6	6	4	3	3	3	3	3	2	3	3	3	2	3	2	3	3	4	4
North East Stars	2	2	2	1	3	5	3	6	5	5	3	5	4	4	5	6	6	6	6	5	5	5	5	5	5	5	5
Police	5	5	3	4	6	6	4	2	2	3	5	4	5	5	6	4	4	5	5	6	6	6	6	6	6	6	6
Club Sando	9	10	10	10	8	9	10	10	9	7	7	7	7	7	7	7	7	7	7	7	7	7	7	7	7	7	7
Point Fortin Civic	10	3	5	8	9	7	7	7	7	6	8	8	8	9	9	8	9	9	8	9	9	9	9	8	8	9	8
Morvant Caledonia United	8	9	9	9	10	10	9	9	10	10	10	10	9	8	8	9	8	8	9	8	8	8	8	9	9	8	9
St. Ann's Rangers	6	7	8	5	7	8	8	8	8	8	9	9	10	10	10	10	10	10	10	10	10	10	10	10	10	10	10

Updated to match(es) played on 12 May 2016. Source: TT Pro League

== Results ==
=== Matches 1–18 ===
Home \ Away	CEN	CSA	DFO	MCU	NES	PFC	POL	SJJ	SAR	WCO
Central FC		2–1	2–2	2–1	3–0	7–0	3–0	5–0	3–1	1–1
Club Sando	0–1		1–4	3–0	0–1	1–3	0–2	0–6	1–0	1–0
Defence Force	0–0	1–1		8–0	6–1	5–1	4–0	1–0	1–1	0–1
Morvant Caledonia	0–4	0–1	1–2		3–1	2–0	1–2	1–2	1–2	1–1
North East Stars	1–0	2–0	1–1	1–2		0–0	4–4	1–3	0–0	0–7
Point Fortin Civic	0–3	1–3	0–0	1–0	1–2		2–1	2–0	1–1	0–0
Police	3–4	5–0	1–0	5–0	0–2	3–2		3–3	2–1	2–4
San Juan Jabloteh	1–0	2–1	0–2	0–1	2–2	3–2	4–2		2–0	1–2
St. Ann's Rangers	1–3	2–2	1–2	1–2	1–2	1–0	1–6	2–3		1–2
W Connection	1–1	0–2	0–2	4–2	3–0	7–1	1–1	2–0	5–0	

Updated to match(es) played on 2 March 2016. Source: TT Pro League
Legend: Blue = home team win; Yellow = draw; Red = away team win.

=== Matches 19–27 ===
Home \ Away	CEN	CSA	DFO	MCU	NES	PFC	POL	SJJ	SAR	WCO
Central FC		4–1	1–0		4–0				7–0	
Club Sando			3–1	2–2	1–2	2–0	3–5	1–4		2–5
Defence Force				1–1	0–1		3–2		4–0	
Morvant Caledonia	0–3				1–3		1–2	0–3	0–1	2–2
North East Stars						3–0	5–2			
Point Fortin Civic	1–3		1–2	0–3			5–0			
Police	1–0							2–3		
San Juan Jabloteh	3–2		2–1		1–0	1–0			1–1	
St. Ann's Rangers		2–3			3–4	2–4	0–1			
W Connection	1–0		0–1		1–3	1–0	0–0	0–1	3–0	

Updated to match(es) played on 22 May 2016. Source: TT Pro League
Legend: Blue = home team win; Yellow = draw; Red = away team win.

== Season statistics ==
=== Scoring ===
- First goal of the season: Alonzo Adlam for North East Stars against Club Sando (26 September 2015)
- First own goal of the season: Kevon Villaroel (Central FC) for North East Stars (16 December 2015)
- First penalty kick of the season: Willis Plaza (scored) for Central FC against Defence Force (20 October 2015)
- First hat-trick of the season: Jomal Williams (W Connection) against St. Ann's Rangers, 2', 19', 48' (12 December 2015)
- Most goals scored by one player in a match: 4
  - Jerwyn Balthazar (Defence Force) against St. Ann's Rangers, 4', 26', 45', 64' (15 January 2016)
- Widest winning margin: 8 goals
  - Defence Force 8–0 Morvant Caledonia United (9 January 2016)
- Most goals in a match: 8 goals
  - North East Stars 4–4 Police (20 October 2015)
  - Defence Force 8–0 Morvant Caledonia United (9 January 2016)
- Most goals in a one half: 6 goals
  - Defence Force v Morvant Caledonia United (9 January 2016) 6–0 at half-time, 8–0 final.
- Most goals in one half by a single team: 6 goals
  - Defence Force v Morvant Caledonia United (9 January 2016) 6–0 at half-time, 8–0 final.

==== Top scorers ====
Rank	Player	Club	Goals
1	(Trinidad and Tobago) Makesi Lewis	Police	21
2	(Trinidad and Tobago) Jason Marcano	Central FC	17
3	(Trinidad and Tobago) Marcus Joseph	Central FC	15
4	(Trinidad and Tobago) Devon Modeste	Club Sando	14
5	(Trinidad and Tobago) Nathan Lewis	San Juan Jabloteh	13
6	(Trinidad and Tobago) Jerwyn Balthazar	Defence Force	12
6	(Trinidad and Tobago) Kareem Freitas	Police	12
8	(Trinidad and Tobago) Jamal Gay	San Juan Jabloteh	11
8	(Trinidad and Tobago) Jomal Williams	W Connection	11
10	(Trinidad and Tobago) Kerry Baptiste	North East Stars	10

==== Hat-tricks ====
Player	For	Against	Result	Date	Ref(s)
(Trinidad and Tobago) Jomal Williams	W Connection*	St. Ann's Rangers	5–0	12 December 2015	
(Trinidad and Tobago) Jamal Gay	San Juan Jabloteh	Club Sando*	0–6	15 December 2015	
(Trinidad and Tobago) Makesi Lewis	Police	St. Ann's Rangers*	1–6	16 December 2015	
(Trinidad and Tobago) Devorn Jorsling	Defence Force*	North East Stars	6–1	19 December 2015	
(Trinidad and Tobago) Jerwyn Balthazar	Defence Force*	Morvant Caledonia United	8–0	9 January 2016	
(Trinidad and Tobago) Jason Marcano	Central FC*	Point Fortin Civic	7–0	15 January 2016	
(Trinidad and Tobago) Jerwyn Balthazar^{4}	Defence Force*	St. Ann's Rangers	4–0	15 January 2016	
(Trinidad and Tobago) Kareem Freitas	Police*	Morvant Caledonia United	5–0	19 January 2016	
(Trinidad and Tobago) Kerry Baptiste	North East Stars*	Police	5–2	6 March 2016	

- * Home team score first in result
- ^{4} Player scored four goals

== Awards ==
=== Monthly awards ===
Month	Manager of the Month		Player of the Month		Ref(s)
Month	Manager	Club	Player	Club	Ref(s)
October	(Trinidad and Tobago) Ross Russell	Central FC	(Trinidad and Tobago) Sean De Silva	Central FC	
November	(Saint Lucia) Stuart Charles-Fevrier	W Connection	(Trinidad and Tobago) Keron Cummings	North East Stars	
December	(Saint Lucia) Stuart Charles-Fevrier	W Connection	(Trinidad and Tobago) Jomal Williams	W Connection	
January	(Trinidad and Tobago) Dale Saunders	Central FC	(Trinidad and Tobago) Jerwyn Balthazar	Defence Force	
February	(Trinidad and Tobago) Dale Saunders	Central FC	(Trinidad and Tobago) Marcus Joseph	Central FC	
March	(Saint Lucia) Stuart Charles-Fevrier	W Connection	(Trinidad and Tobago) Kerry Baptiste	North East Stars	
April			(Trinidad and Tobago) Makesi Lewis	Police	
May			(Trinidad and Tobago) Anthony Wolfe	North East Stars	
