= List of TT Pro League highest scoring games =

The following is a list of the highest scoring games and widest winning margins in the TT Pro League since its inception in 1999. The record for the biggest win and highest scoring game is W Connection's 17–0 victory against Tobago United at Ato Boldon Stadium on 13 October 2004. In fact, the match produced five hat-tricks from Dwayne Ellis, Joe Luciano Viera, and nine goals from Saint Lucian Titus Elva, who is the current holder of the TT Pro League single game scoring record.

== Highest scoring games ==
Goals scored	Date	Home team	Result	Away team	Goal scorers	Ref(s)
17	13 October 2004	W Connection	17–0	Tobago United		
14	30 June 2004	Tobago United	1–13	North East Stars		
14	18 September 2004	South Starworld Strikers	13–1	Tobago United	Borde 9', 14', 15', 50', Prospar 25', 39', Jerome 27', Franklyn 42', Andrews 45', Hernandez 53', Ramnarine 76', Julien 82', Alleyne 87' (o.g.); Mark 89'	
11	29 October 2003	Tobago United	2–9	North East Stars	Nixon 16', 47', 64', 75', Jerome 10', 12', 55', Jeffrey 87', 88'	
11	20 September 2013	San Juan Jabloteh	6–5	St. Ann's Rangers	Baptiste 12', 50', 69', Britto 65', 78', Hospidales 83'; McFee 15', 21', 23', Isles 43', Darko 88'	
10	21 May 2003	Defence Force	1–9	San Juan Jabloteh	Phillips 90'; Eve 9', 70', Glen 31', 42', Mulraine 50', Williams 57' (o.g.), Baptiste 60', 87', 90'	
10	28 November 2001	Morvant Caledonia United	8–2	Doc's Khelwalaas		
10	23 October 2008	Tobago United	0–10	Defence Force	Jorsling 5', 29', 37', Durity 16', Edwards 17', 21', Carter 54', 55', Jack 60' (o.g.), Roy 87'	

== Widest winning margins ==
Goals margin	Date	Home team	Result	Away team	Goal scorers	Ref(s)
17	13 October 2004	W Connection	17–0	Tobago United		
12	30 June 2004	Tobago United	1–13	North East Stars		
12	18 September 2004	South Starworld Strikers	13–1	Tobago United	Borde 9', 14', 15', 50', Prospar 25', 39', Jerome 27', Franklyn 42', Andrews 45', Hernandez 53', Ramnarine 76', Julien 82', Alleyne 87' (o.g.); Mark 89'	
10	23 October 2008	Tobago United	0–10	Defence Force	Jorsling 5', 29', 37', Durity 16', Edwards 17', 21', Carter 54', 55', Jack 60' (o.g.), Roy 87'	

== See also ==
- List of TT Pro League hat-tricks
