= TT Premier Football League =

- Founded: 5 January 1999; 27 years ago (as Professional Football League) (1999–2001)
- First season: 1999
- Country: Trinidad and Tobago
- Confederation: CONCACAF
- Number of clubs: 12
- Level on pyramid: 1
- Relegation to: None
- Domestic cup(s): FA Trophy; Digicel Charity Shield
- League cup(s): First Citizens Cup; TOYOTA Classic; Lucozade Sport Goal Shield; Digicel Pro Bowl
- International cup(s): Regional; CFU Club Shield; CONCACAF Caribbean Cup; Continental; CONCACAF Champions Cup
- Current champions: Defence Force F.C. (2025–26)
- Most championships: W Connection F.C. (6 titles)
- Top scorer: Devorn Jorsling (144 goals)
- Website: thettfa.com
- Current: 2025–26 TT Premier Football League

The TT Premier Football League (formerly known as the TT Pro League) is the Trinidad and Tobago professional league for association football clubs. It is the country's primary football competition and serves as the top division in the Trinidad and Tobago football league system. Contested by twelve clubs, the league is one of the world's few football leagues that does not operate on an automatic system of promotion and relegation. Seasons run from September to May, with teams playing 18 games each totaling 90 games in the season. Most games are played in the evenings of Fridays (Super Fridays) and Saturdays (Fiesta Saturdays), with a few games played during weekday evenings. TTPFL clubs also play in other competitions, such as the FA Trophy, League Cup, TOYOTA Classic, Goal Shield, and Pro Bowl against domestic clubs from other divisions; and against clubs from other countries in the CFU Club Shield, CONCACAF Caribbean Cup, and the CONCACAF Champions Cup.

The TT Premier Football League was founded as part of a need for a professional league to strengthen the country's national team and improve the development of its domestic players. The league is a corporation in which the member clubs act as shareholders and was inaugurated on 5 January 1999 under the name Professional Football League before switching to its current name after three years of existence. The TT Premier Football League headquarters is located northwest of Trinidad and Tobago in St. Augustine. The league is currently sponsored by Digicel and thus officially known as the Digicel Pro League. The TT Premier Football League is currently ranked 135th in the world and 12th in CONCACAF based on results during the previous calendar year according to the International Federation of Football History & Statistics (IFFHS).

Since 1908, a total of 24 clubs have been crowned champions of the Trinidad and Tobago football system. Of the 22 distinct clubs to have competed in the TT Pro League since its inception, six have won the title: W Connection (6 titles), San Juan Jabloteh (4), Defence Force and Central FC (3), Joe Public (2), and North East Stars (2). The current champions are W Connection after the club won their 6th Pro League title in the 2018 season, 13 years after their first in 2004.

== History ==
=== Origins (1974–1993) ===
Prior to the 1990s, professionalism in Trinidad and Tobago football was non-existent. In the 1970s and 1980s, the National League, composed primarily of amateur players, served as the highest level in the Trinidad and Tobago football league system. However, it was during this period Trinidad and Tobago experienced an upswing in support for football following a rise in international success at both club and national team levels. In 1985, Defence Force became only the second team from CONCACAF to accomplish the continental treble after the club won the National League, FA Trophy, and CONCACAF Champions' Cup. Coupled with the Strike Squad's near qualification for the 1990 FIFA World Cup, optimism for the country's first appearance at the World Cup was at an all-time high.

However, the early 1990s marked a low point in Trinidad and Tobago football. In 1993, after a streak of poor performances, the Soca Warriors gave its worst ever showing in the Caribbean Cup after finishing a disappointing third, which was preceded with an early exit from its 1994 FIFA World Cup qualification attempt. In response, Trinidadian and former FIFA vice-president Jack Warner spoke out describing Trinidad and Tobago's football as being "in shambles" and crowd support was "non-existent".

=== Foundation (1994–1998) ===
In November 1995, Jack Warner proposed that creating a professional league to produce homegrown players would function as the building blocks to qualify for the 1998 FIFA World Cup in France. In fact, speaking on the importance of a professional league for the future, Warner stated "professionalism or death for Trinidad and Tobago football." His proposal, which included the clubs' ability to operate as business entities, laid the foundation for professional football in Trinidad and Tobago.

In order to successfully develop a professional football league in the country, the Trinidad and Tobago Football Association established the Semi-Professional League in 1996 to provide teams and players with a semi-professional environment, as they transitioned during a three-year period for life in a professional league. In particular, clubs were issued three important criteria that would be used for professional league admission:

- The incoming club must show proof of a home venue to stage matches,
- The incoming club must provide a minimum wage of TT$2,000 per month to a contracted player,
- The incoming club must have a minimum of sixteen (16) contracted players, a manager, and a physiotherapist.

After the final season of the Semi-Professional League, several clubs were denied admission after failing to meet the aforementioned criteria. Clubs were also faced with supplying the professional league a bank draft guaranteeing TT$400,000 for admission.

=== Development (1999–2008) ===
TT Premier Football League Champions
Season	Champions
1999	Defence Force
2000	W Connection
2001	W Connection
2002	San Juan Jabloteh
2003–04	San Juan Jabloteh
2004	North East Stars
2005	W Connection
2006	Joe Public
2007	San Juan Jabloteh
2008	San Juan Jabloteh
2009	Joe Public
2010–11	Defence Force
2011–12	W Connection
2012–13	Defence Force
2013–14	W Connection
2014–15	Central
2015–16	Central
2016–17	Central
2017	North East Stars
2018	W Connection
2019–20	Defence Force
2023	Defence Force
2023–24	Port of Spain
2024–25	Defence Force
2025–26	Defence Force
Further information: Trinidad and Tobago football champions

The Trinidad and Tobago all-professional league, called the Professional Football League, was founded on 5 January 1999 with its inaugural season held in the same year to become the first professional football league in the Caribbean. The eight inaugural members were Defence Force, Doc's Khelwalaas, FUTGOF, Joe Public, Point Fortin Civic, Police, San Juan Jabloteh, and W Connection. In the first professional season, Defence Force continued a theme set during the 1970s, 1980s, and early 1990s, which saw the club win a record twentieth league championship.

The Professional Football League would continue for two more seasons before a decision from its owner and founder, Jack Warner, to withdraw funding for the league. Early league results suggested an improvement in player development with several domestic professionals named to starting roles in the national team. Consequently, club owners agreed in March 2012 to develop a new professional league that would operate rather as a corporation, known as the T&T Pro League Limited, owned by the member clubs and a continuation of the Professional Football League. One month later, the TT Pro League began with eight members: Arima Fire, Caledonia AIA, Defence Force, Joe Public, North East Stars, San Juan Jabloteh, South Starworld Strikers, and defending champions W Connection.

After establishing itself on the talents of homegrown players during its initial years, the league continued to see several of its stars move to leagues in Europe and North America. Collin Samuel was the first to leave when he signed for Falkirk in August 2002, and was joined at Dundee United a year later by Jason Scotland. Kenwyne Jones, former standout for Joe Public and W Connection, signed with Southampton, whereas Cornell Glen of San Juan Jabloteh joined the MetroStars of Major League Soccer during the 2004 season. The departures ultimately benefited the Pro League as the national team, composed of several current and former Pro League players, qualified for the nation's first FIFA World Cup in November 2005.

In the build-up to the 2006 FIFA World Cup, community interest in local football was at an all-time high and the Pro League garnered praise for its development of homegrown professional footballers. As a result, the league implemented a series of marketing plans to establish itself as a viable professional league. Two major initiatives were to increase league membership back to ten teams and establish a reserve league in 2007 for players that were previously on the bench during league matches to have a league of their own to show scouts their skills on the field.

=== Recent years (2009–present) ===
After the league's first decade, the TT Pro League has taken steps to internationalise the league in an effort to raise the level of its competition. One of the first moves in this regard was to align its calendar with those of major football leagues around the world. Prior to 2011, the Pro League operated on a spring-to-fall format which caused several conflicts with the FIFA calendar. Consequently, many of the league's top players abandoned their Pro League clubs during June and July to compete in international competitions, which made it difficult for the league to attract supporters for its matches. The schedule change has provided several players greater transfer opportunities to more prominent leagues. The second move was to expand club rosters from 25 to 35 players to provide clubs flexibility during the prolonged calendar featuring three rounds of league competition, five domestic cup competitions, CFU Club Championship, and the CONCACAF Champions League.

The Pro League has also started to market itself on the talents of its Trinidad and Tobago players, both experienced and young talents. Beginning in 2009, the league witnessed a return of several former national team stars, including Stern John, Russell Latapy, Dennis Lawrence, and Dwight Yorke. Several more Pro League players have made a significant impact on the league after spending a majority of their career on the twin-island Republic. In the 2009 season, Arnold Dwarika of United Petrotrin became the first Trinidadian player to score 100 Pro League goals. Moreover, breakout stars such as Keon Daniel, Cornell Glen, Kevin Molino, and Lester Peltier began making names for themselves in the Pro League before starring for the Soca Warriors and securing transfers to Asia, Europe, and North America. This exchange of top prospects for veterans to the Pro League signifies an increased international awareness and potential for popularity.

== Corporate structure ==
The TT Pro League is operated as a corporation and is owned by the ten member clubs known as T&T Pro League Limited. The board of directors, consisting of a representative from each club, sets out the policy to oversee league operations and selects a neutral chairman and CEO. The chairman is elected by the board and cannot be associated with any of its member teams. In addition, the operational aspect of the league is carried out by a management team led by the CEO. The office employs marketing, public relations, media, accounting, and administrative staff. The Trinidad and Tobago Football Association is not directly involved in the day-to-day operations of the Pro League, but has veto power during the elections of the chairman and chief executive officer, and when new rules are adopted by the league.

Each Pro League club is required to have a board of directors, chairman, chief executive officer, administrator, manager and an assistant, marketing and public relations manager, equipment manager, physiotherapist, and a youth development officer. In addition, clubs are also required to have a dedicated home venue, which is secure allowing for the collection of gate receipts and with a good playing surface. The size of the playing field must meet international standards and must be approved by the league's technical committee. As part of each club's financial stability off the field, clubs must submit a marketing plan that illustrates how the club will generate financial and physical support to meet monthly commitments.

Having started on such a corporate structure, the league has recently taken several steps to establish itself as one of the premier leagues in CONCACAF. Upon creation, the league's first goal was to establish better crowd attendances for its matches. With the construction of several football stadiums during the first few years of its development, the league created a foundation of fan support. More recently, the league has now set a new mission to create more local talent and make the players not just available for the Trinidad and Tobago audience, but for the world.

== Competition format ==
=== League competition ===
There are twelve clubs in the TT Premier Football League. During the course of a league season (from September to May) each team competes against every other team twice (a double round-robin system), once at their home stadium and once at that of their opponents. In the last nine matches of the regular season each team competes against every other team at neutral venues for a total of 27 games. Each match sees the winning team awarded three points, or in the case of a draw, the teams receive one point each. No points are awarded for a loss. At the end of each season, the club with the most points is crowned champion. If points are equal, the goal difference, followed by total goals scored, and then by head-to-head records between tying teams determine the winner. If still equal, teams are deemed to occupy the same position. If there is a tie for the championship or for qualification to other competitions, a play-off match at a neutral venue decides rank. There is no automatic promotion and relegation between the Pro League and National Super League, the second-level in the Trinidad and Tobago football league system. Club members of the Pro League vote to determine which, if any, applications for admission into the league will be permitted with preference given to the Super League champion.

=== Cup competitions ===
The TT Pro League organises five knock-out cup competitions each league season: the League Cup (commonly called the First Citizens Cup), the Digicel Pro Bowl, the TOYOTA Classic, the Goal Shield (or for sponsorship reasons, the Lucozade Sport Goal Shield), and the TTPFL Knockout Cup, which was established in 2023. The League Cup and Pro Bowl, established in 2000 and 2004, respectively, are cup competitions open exclusively to Pro League clubs. The Pro League agreed to create another knock-out cup competition in 2009 for its clubs named the Goal Shield with a unique prize system. The Classic, established in 2005, comprises a sixteen club knock-out competition open to all teams in the Pro League, with remaining positions filled by teams from the National Super League. In addition, Pro League clubs also compete in the annual FA Trophy organised by and named after the Trinidad and Tobago Football Association. The knockout tournament is the oldest football competition in Trinidad and Tobago, dating back to 1927, and is open to all clubs affiliated with the Football Association.

The league introduced in 2012, the Charity Shield to mark the start of each TT Pro League season. The Charity Shield contests the winners of the previous year's Pro Bowl and the champions of the Pro League. In the case that the league champion also is the holder of the Pro Bowl, then the top two teams in the previous league season compete for the Charity Shield. Generally regarded as below the FA Trophy and First Citizens Cup in terms of importance, the fixture is a recognised football Super Cup. The TTPFL Knockout Cup was introduced in the 2023 season which includes teams from the TT Premier Football League and TT Super League.

=== Continental qualification ===
Beginning with the 2006 season, qualification changed to allow the Pro League two automatic berths into the CFU Club Championship. In order to qualify for the annual subcontinental tournament, Pro League teams need to finish the previous league season either as champion or runners-up. Both teams enter the competition in the first round, which comprises a single round-robin with each group winner advancing to the final round. Since the inception of the CFU Club Championship, the winner of the competition has qualified for the CONCACAF Champions' Cup. However, with the formation and restructure of the Champions' Cup into the Champions League in 2008–09, the Caribbean gained two qualification places. Consequently, the top three Caribbean clubs in the annual Club Championship earn qualification into the Champions League. In the case any Caribbean club is precluded, it is supplanted by the fourth-place finisher from the Club Championship.

During its first four seasons, the top three Caribbean clubs entered the Champions League in a preliminary round and with a win from the two-legged knockout tie entered the sixteen-team group stage (four groups of four), then followed by an eight-team home-and-away single elimination tournament. However, CONCACAF announced a new format beginning with its 2012–13 Champions League. Under the new format, all teams begin play in the group stage (eight groups of three), which includes each year's top three Caribbean finishers.

== Sponsorship ==
Digicel Pro League sponsorship logo as used by media

The TT Pro League has been sponsored under its current format under various title sponsors. The sponsor has been able to determine the league's sponsorship name. The list below details who the sponsors have been and what they called the competition:

- 1999: Craven A (Craven A Professional Football League)
- 2000–2009: No sponsor (Professional Football League (until 2001) then TT Pro League)
- 2009–2017: Digicel (Digicel Pro League)

As well as sponsorship for the league itself, the Pro League has a number of official partners and suppliers. These partners include companies involved in car dealership, financial services, food and beverage, sports-wear and equipment, and pharmaceuticals.

== Finances ==
The TT Pro League has faced major obstacles towards its sustainability and viability as a professional football league within the Caribbean since its inception. Among the main issues that ail many Pro League clubs, apart from insufficient sponsorship, is the lack of community football grounds. Although the country has five football stadiums, which were constructed to stage the 2001 FIFA U-17 World Championship, none of which are located within a club's respective community and are owned by the Ministry of Sport. Consequently, clubs have found it difficult to obtain a significant portion of gate receipts from their home matches. Several clubs have voiced their displeasure in playing home matches in various stadiums around the country and feel that having home grounds within their respective communities is a key to their financial viability.

Shirt sponsorships
Club	Main sponsor(s)	Annual value
Morvant Caledonia United	Neal & Massy and NLCB	Undisclosed
Central FC	Super Industrial Services	Undisclosed
North East Stars	Japs Fried Chicken	Undisclosed
Point Fortin Civic	Worldwide Safety	Undisclosed
San Juan Jabloteh	NLCB	Undisclosed
St. Ann's Rangers	PlusOne Fashion	US$75,000
W Connection	DirecTV	Undisclosed
Clubs without a shirt sponsor: Defence Force and Police (Note: Defence Force and Police are government sponsored clubs and cannot have corporate sponsorship agreements.)

Clubs have also encountered problems in lack of merchandising and television revenue. In fact, a majority of Pro League clubs fail to have a marketing plan and a lack presence within their respective communities, which has significantly impacted crowd attendances and ability for clubs to earn sufficient revenue. Consequently, the league has witnessed a high team turnover with seven clubs suspending their football operations and withdrawing from the Pro League during a four-year period, citing financial difficulties and inability to secure long-term sponsors.

In order to off-set the lack of revenue from match attendances, clubs may be sponsored by national and international companies. The first club to secure a corporate sponsor was San Juan Jabloteh when the club signed an agreement with CL Financial. As a result, the club used its sponsorship to significantly expand its operations from a youth organisation into a professional football club. Several more Pro League clubs have agreed to title sponsorships to provide each club financial stability. The most prominent title sponsor agreement occurred when W Connection ended their partnership with Vibe CT 105.1 FM in favour of an undisclosed deal with DirecTV in 2012.

In addition, clubs may also sell ad space on the front of their shirts, following the practice of international sport, specifically association football. There are currently seven clubs that have signed sponsorship deals to have company logos placed on the front of their shirts. The most lucrative shirt sponsorship occurred when St. Ann's Rangers announced a six-year agreement with PlusOne Fashion of the United States to supply training, travel, and match-day shirts valuing US$75,000 for each season of the six-year deal.

== Clubs ==
A total of 22 distinct clubs have played in the TT Premier Football League from its inception in 1999, but only six teams have won the league title. Two teams have also been members of the league every season since its inception (Defence Force F.C. and W Connection F.C.). Among the current ten clubs, eight (Club Sando F.C, Defence Force F.C, Morvant Caledonia United, Point Fortin Civic F.C, Police F.C, San Juan Jabloteh F.C, St. Ann's Rangers F.C, and W Connection F.C.) existed before the TT Premier Football League was formed. In October 2023, FC Phoenix was approved by the TTPFL and became the first Tobago based club, since the now defunct Tobago United did in the former TT Pro League, to compete in the league. For a list of league champions, club expansion and contraction, and top scorers for each season, see List of TT Pro League seasons.

Twelve out of the thirteen clubs competed in the TT Premier Football League during the 2024–25 season:

Club	Founded	First joined	Location	Stadium	Capacity	Position in 2023–24	Top division titles	Last title
Central FC	2012	2012	California	Ato Boldon Stadium	10,000	11th	3	2016–17
Club Sando	1991	2015	San Fernando	Mahaica Oval Pavilion	2,500	4th	0	N/A
Cunupia FC		2019	Cunupia	Larry Gomes Stadium	10,000	10th	0	N/A
Defence Force	1972	1999	Chaguaramas	Hasely Crawford Stadium	27,000	3rd	24	2023
La Horquetta Rangers	1979	2006	La Horquetta	La Horquetta Phase 2 Recreation Ground	27,000	5th	0	N/A
Morvant Caledonia United	1979	2000	Morvant	Larry Gomes Stadium	10,000	7th	0	N/A
FC Phoenix		2024		Dwight Yorke Stadium	7,500	6th	0	N/A
Point Fortin Civic	1968	1999	Point Fortin	Mahaica Oval Pavilion	2,500	8th	0	N/A
Police FC	1975	1999	Saint James	Hasely Crawford Stadium	27,000	2nd	3	1994
Port of Spain	2001	2002	Port of Spain	Arima Velodrome	1,200	1st	3	2023–24
Prison Service		2023	Arouca	Ato Boldon Stadium	10,000	9th	0	N/A
San Juan Jabloteh	1974	1999	San Juan	Ato Boldon Recreation Park	27,000	N/A	4	2008
W Connection	1986	1999	Point Lisas	Manny Ramjohn Stadium	10,000	N/A	6	2018

=== Honoured clubs ===
Location of the 2016–17 TT Pro League teams

The TT Premier Football League follows the practice of association football in honouring clubs that have won multiple championships or other honours by the display of a representative golden star above the honoured club's badge. Each country's usage is unique and in Trinidad and Tobago the practice is to award one star for each of the following achievements:

- Winners of at least ten championship titles in Trinidad and Tobago,
- Winners of the CFU Club Championship (1997–2022),
- Winners of the CONCACAF Champions' Cup (1962–2008) or CONCACAF Champions League (2008–2023).

The following clubs have gold stars featured while playing in the TT Premier Football League and international competition.

Club	Stars	Top division titles (Pro League titles)	Caribbean Club Championships	CONCACAF Champions' Cup or Champions League
Defence Force FC		23 (3)	1	2

Defence Force F.C. is currently the lone TT Premier Football League club to place gold stars above their badge during domestic and international competitions. The Teteron Boys were awarded their first star in 1978 after winning the 1978 CONCACAF Champions' Cup. Their most recent star was earned after winning the 2001 CFU Club Championship in 2001. Although, Morvant Caledonia United, Joe Public F.C, San Juan Jabloteh F.C, United Petrotrin F.C, and W Connection F.C. have won the Caribbean Club Championship, the clubs' badges have not featured gold stars.

== Stadiums ==
Until the early 1980s, the national team held its home matches in Queen's Park Oval, generally thought of as the most picturesque and largest of the old cricket grounds in the West Indies. The cricket ground is the country's oldest stadium and served as host to domestic football league matches for Defence Force and San Juan Jabloteh during the league's inaugural season. After renovation in preparation of the 2007 Cricket World Cup, the capacity of the ground rose to 20,000 seats.

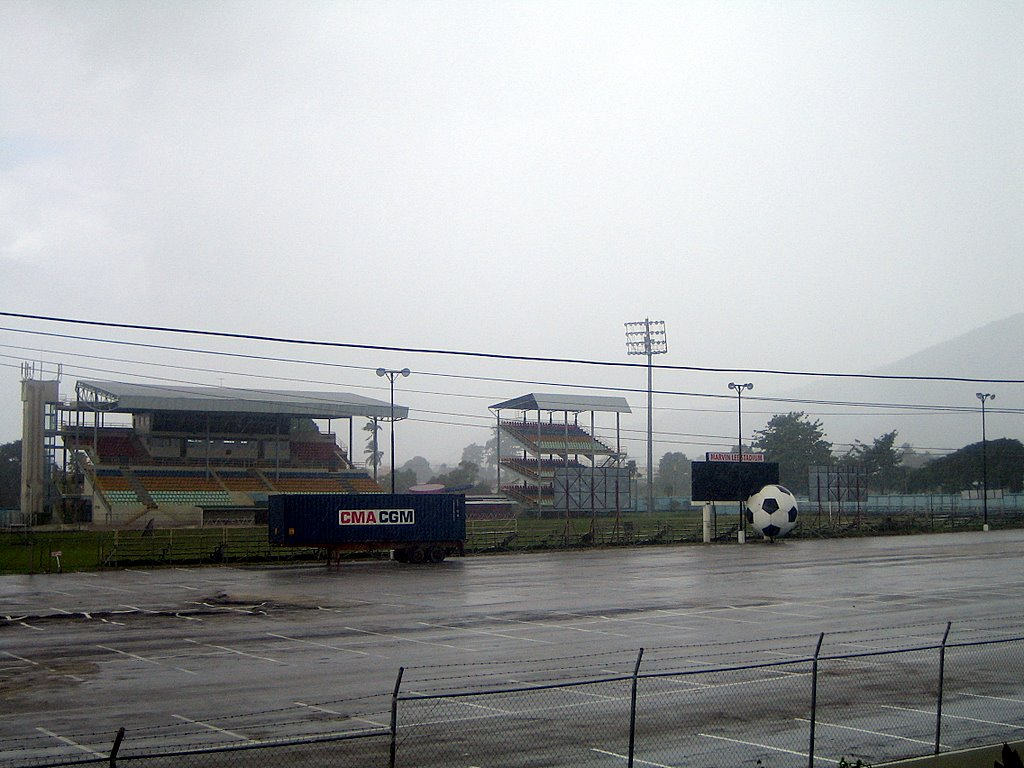
Marvin Lee Stadium, the first Caribbean stadium to install an artificial playing surface

In 1996, Marvin Lee Stadium was built in Macoya and is housed together with the Dr. João Havelange Centre of Excellence. The stadium served as the home to former member of the Pro League, Joe Public, and holds approximately 6,000. In 2005, Jack Warner proposed that Marvin Lee Stadium install an artificial playing surface, citing that it would bring more credibility to the region. Two years later, through a developmental grant from FIFA, Joe Public became the first Caribbean club to install astroturf, reportedly costing in excess of TT$8 million. Low-profile games, such as international friendlies against other islands in the Caribbean, are also played at the stadium.

However, it was not until 2001, with Trinidad and Tobago awarded the FIFA U-17 World Championship, that four additional football stadiums were constructed for the event – Ato Boldon Stadium in Couva, Larry Gomes Stadium in Malabar, Manny Ramjohn Stadium in Marabella, and Dwight Yorke Stadium in Bacolet. In addition, the National Stadium, renamed in honour of Hasely Crawford, underwent major renovation for the competition and expanded capacity to 27,000 to become the largest stadium in the country. The stadium would stage a semi-final, third place, and final matches during the 2001 FIFA U-17 World Championship.

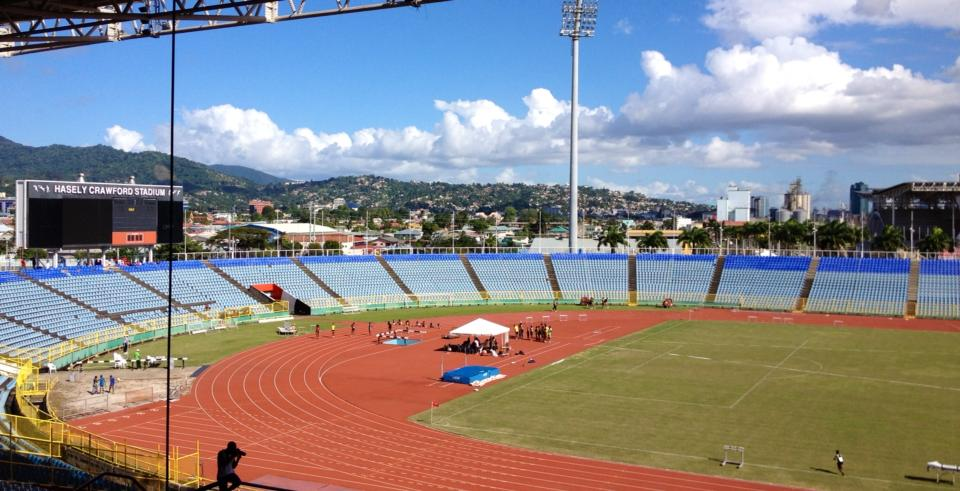
Hasely Crawford Stadium, home to Defence Force, San Juan Jabloteh, St. Ann's Rangers, and the national team

Shortly after the international tournament, several TT Pro League clubs moved into the newly constructed football stadiums. Defence Force, Police, San Juan Jabloteh, and St. Ann's Rangers moved into the renovated Hasely Crawford Stadium, Arima Fire relocated from Arima Municipal Stadium into Larry Gomes Stadium, and Manny Ramjohn Stadium served as the new venue for W Connection. Expansion club South Starworld Strikers played host to league matches in Ato Boldon Stadium. The stadium now is the home to Central FC following the withdrawal of the Strikers from the league in 2006. Through the admission of Tobago United into the league for the 2003–04 season, the Tobago Boys played their home games in Dwight Yorke Stadium until they withdrew from the league in 2010. With the additions of the Mahaica Oval Pavilion, Palo Seco Velodrome, and Sangre Grande Regional Complex, home of Point Fortin Civic, former club United Petrotrin, and North East Stars, respectively, Pro League teams have played in sixteen football stadiums.

== Managers ==
Managers in the TT Pro League are involved in the day-to-day running of the team, including the training, team selection, and player acquisition. Their influence varies from club-to-club and is related to the ownership of the club and the relationship of the manager with fans. Caretaker appointments are managers that fill the gap between a managerial departure and a new appointment. Occasionally caretaker managers have gone on to secure a permanent managerial post after performing well as a caretaker.

The league's longest-serving manager was Jamaal Shabazz, who was in charge of Morvant Caledonia United from April 2000 until he agreed to become the Trinidad and Tobago national team co-manager in November 2012 (12 years and 236 days). Stuart Charles-Fevrier is now the Pro League's longest-serving current manager having been in charge of the Savonetta Boys of W Connection since June 2004.

There have been eight managers that have won the Pro League. In addition, four foreign managers have secured the Pro League championship, which comprise two English (Terry Fenwick, San Juan Jabloteh, three wins, and Ricky Hill, San Juan Jabloteh, one win), a Guyanese (James McLean, North East Stars, one win), and a Saint Lucian (Stuart Charles-Fevrier, W Connection, five wins). Michael McComie became the second Trinidad and Tobago manager to win the league, when he won the title with Joe Public in 2006. Derek King later became the third Trinidad and Tobago manager to claim the league title in 2009, also with Joe Public. In fact, King became the youngest manager to win the league title at 29 years, 198 days. The current managers in the Pro League are:

Manager	Club	Appointed	Time as manager	Ref(s)
(Saint Lucia) Stuart Charles-Fevrier	W Connection	1 June 2004	22 years, 169 days	
(Trinidad and Tobago) Marvin Gordon	Defence Force			
(Trinidad and Tobago) Derek King	North East Stars			
(Trinidad and Tobago) Richard Hood	Police			
(Trinidad and Tobago) Jamaal Shabazz	Morvant Caledonia United			
(Trinidad and Tobago) Reynold Carrington	Point Fortin Civic			
(Trinidad and Tobago) Keith Jeffrey	San Juan Jabloteh	10 September 2013	13 years, 68 days	
(Trinidad and Tobago) Stern John	Central FC			
(Trinidad and Tobago) Adrian Romain	St. Ann's Rangers			

== Players ==
=== Foreign players and transfer regulations ===
TT Pro League clubs have almost complete freedom to sign whatever number and category of players they wish. There is no team or individual salary cap, no age restrictions other than those applied by general employment law, and no restrictions on the overall number of foreign players or nationalities. However, players can only be transferred during transfer windows that are set by the TT Pro League. The two current transfer windows run from the last day of the season to 15 September and between 15 December and 15 January. Player registrations cannot be exchanged outside these windows except under specific licence, usually on an emergency basis. In addition, Pro League clubs cannot sign free agents at any stage of the Pro League season outside of transfer windows.

The Pro League has been growing in popularity within the Caribbean and expanding across the Americas. In particular, over 200 foreign players have competed in the league, and with Trinidad and Tobago's inclusion in the 2006 FIFA World Cup, the Pro League was represented for the first time with Cyd Gray, Aurtis Whitley, Anthony Wolfe (all of San Juan Jabloteh), and David Atiba Charles (W Connection). Furthermore, two foreign players have claimed the Player of the Year award in league history. Charles Pollard (Guyana) won the award in 2003–04 while playing for North East Stars, while Gefferson (Brazil) claimed the honour in 2005 with W Connection.

Notable foreign players

This list of foreign players includes those who received international caps while playing for a TT Pro League club, made significant contributions to a TT Pro League club in terms of appearances or goals, and/or who made significant contributions to the sport either before they played for a TT Pro League club, or after they left. It is clearly not yet complete and all inclusive, and additions and refinements will continue to be made over time.

Africa

- (Botswana) Mogogi Gabonamong
- (Botswana) Kagiso Tshelametsi
- (South Sudan) Ladulé Lako LoSarah

Asia

- (Japan) Yu Hoshide

Europe

- (Scotland) James Baird

North & Central America, Caribbean

- (Antigua and Barbuda) Peter Byers
- (Antigua and Barbuda) George Dublin
- (Antigua and Barbuda) Gayson Gregory
- (Belize) Mark Leslie
- (Dominica) Julian Wade
- (Dominican Republic) Jonathan Faña
- (Dominican Republic) Miguel Lloyd
- (Grenada) Jamal Charles
- (Grenada) Shemel Louison
- (Guyana) Shawn Beveney
- (Guyana) Trayon Bobb
- (Guyana) Nigel Codrington
- (Guyana) Randolph Jerome
- (Guyana) Kayode McKinnon
- (Guyana) Walter Moore
- (Guyana) Charles Pollard
- (Guyana) Gregory Richardson
- (Guyana) Pernell Schultz
- (Haiti) Pierre Richard Bruny
- (Jamaica) Sean Fraser
- (Jamaica) Jermaine Hue
- (Jamaica) Roen Nelson
- (Jamaica) Lovel Palmer
- (Saint Kitts and Nevis) Keith Gumbs
- (Saint Kitts and Nevis) George Isaac
- (Saint Kitts and Nevis) Gerard Williams
- (Saint Lucia) Titus Elva
- (Saint Lucia) Kurt Frederick
- (Saint Lucia) Earl Jean
- (Saint Lucia) Elijah Joseph
- (Saint Lucia) Zaine Pierre
- (Saint Vincent and the Grenadines) Shandel Samuel
- (Saint Vincent and the Grenadines) Cornelius Stewart
- (Saint Vincent and the Grenadines) Kendall Velox
- (Suriname) Dimitrie Apai
- (Suriname) Stefano Rijssel

South America

- (Brazil) João Ananias
- (Brazil) Gefferson
- (Brazil) José Maria Manoel
- (Brazil) William Oliveira
- (Brazil) Ronaldo Viana
- (Colombia) Alejandro Figueroa
- (Colombia) Christian Viveros
- (Venezuela) Alvis Faure Díaz

=== Player wages and transfer records ===
There is no team or individual salary cap in the TT Pro League. However, with the league's founding in 1999, the Pro League established a minimum player salary of TT$18,000 per year. As of the 2013–14 season, the average Pro League player wage was between TT$30,000 to TT$50,000 per year; with top players earning up to TT$90,000, which is significantly lower than average salaries in the United States' Major League Soccer (TT$1,032,671) or Football League Two, the fourth tier of English football (TT$419,182). Although individual player salaries are undisclosed, one known player's salary became available with the 4 May 2012 publication of ESPN The Magazine. The magazine stated that Shandel Samuel was the highest earning Vincentian athlete in 2011 with a salary of TT$40,000 while playing for Ma Pau.

There are few examples of player transfer fees agreed upon between Pro League clubs in the domestic competition for a player to switch teams. One of the first transfers involving a Pro League player occurred when Carlos Edwards signed with Wrexham of the Football League for £250,000 in 2000. A year later, Dennis Lawrence joined Edwards at the Welsh club for £100,000 from Defence Force. In 2004, in a common practice with Pro League player transfers, Kenwyne Jones was sold to Southampton of the English Premier League for a nominal fee, reported to be £100,000, with the Pro League club claiming an additional sell-on clause. After Jones was sold to Sunderland of the Premier League in 2007 for £6 million, the Savonetta Boys secured a percentage of the transfer fee in the region of US$1 million.

=== Top scorers ===
All-Time Top Scorers in TT Pro League (Pro League goals only)
Rank	Player	Goals
1	(Trinidad and Tobago) **Devorn Jorsling**	144
2	(Trinidad and Tobago) **Kerry Baptiste**	141
3	(Guyana) Randolph Jerome	112
4	(Trinidad and Tobago) Arnold Dwarika	103
5	(Saint Lucia) Earl Jean	90
6	(Trinidad and Tobago) **Anthony Wolfe**	79
7	(Trinidad and Tobago) Aurtis Whitley	76
8	(Trinidad and Tobago) **Andre Toussaint**	68
9	(Trinidad and Tobago) **Jason Marcano**	66
10	(Trinidad and Tobago) **Josimar Belgrave**	64
(**Bold** denotes players still playing in the TT Pro League) (Italics denotes players still playing professional football)

Following each TT Pro League season, the Golden Boot is awarded to the league's top goal scorer. Defence Force and Trinidad and Tobago international, Devorn Jorsling, holds the record for the most Pro League goals with 144, following the 2015–16 season. Jorsling has finished among the top ten goal scorers in eight of the previous nine seasons in the Pro League.

Since the first Pro League season in 1999, 14 different players from seven different clubs have won or shared the top scorers title. Devorn Jorsling became the first player to claim the Golden Boot on four occasions, after scoring the most goals in the 2008, 2010–11, 2012–13, and 2014–15 seasons. However, complete statistics and goal scoring records are unknown for the 1999 through 2003–04 seasons. Arnold Dwarika holds the record for most goals in a season (45) – for Joe Public. Dwarika's record came in the 1999 season, which consisted of 28 games. The first foreign player to claim the Golden Boot was Guyanese international Randolph Jerome of North East Stars who finished with 28 goals in 2003–04. Since then, four more foreign players have finished as the league's top scorer. Gefferson (Brazil) and Earl Jean (Saint Lucia) shared the title in 2005 with 14 goals each. Other foreign players to win include Roen Nelson (Jamaica) in 2007 and Peter Byers (Antigua and Barbuda) in 2008.

The highest-scoring match to date in the Pro League occurred on 13 October 2004 when W Connection defeated Tobago United 17–0. In fact, Saint Lucian Titus Elva scored nine goals in the match and is currently the holder of the Pro League single game scoring record. Devorn Jorsling has the honour of achieving the most Pro League hat-tricks with nine. Former Joe Public, North East Stars, and current San Juan Jabloteh winger Kerry Baptiste has scored three or more goals on eight occasions. In addition, Baptiste, Elva, and Nixon are tied for the most league matches with four or more goals (a beaver-trick) with two.

== Awards ==
=== Player and manager awards ===
In addition to the winner's trophy and the individual winner's medals awarded to players, the TT Pro League also awards a number of position players and goalkeepers for their contributions to their club at the conclusion of each league season. The Player of the Year award is given to the most outstanding player of the previous season. To date five players to win the award have also guided their respective clubs to a league championship in the same season. In addition, the league also awards the best position players including the best goalkeeper, defender, midfielder, and forward of the year.

The league also names the Manager of the Year award given to the top manager of each Pro League season. The title has been awarded to four foreign managers, which comprises two English (Ricky Hill, San Juan Jabloteh, and Terry Fenwick, San Juan Jabloteh), a Guyanese (James McLean, North East Stars), and a Saint Lucian (Stuart Charles-Fevrier, W Connection). On five occasions the award was given to the manager that led his club to a league championship. Most recently, Derek King became the third Trinidad and Tobago manager to claim the award with Joe Public. King became the youngest manager to win the award at 29 years, 198 days. Beginning in the 2012–13 season, the Pro League re-instituted the Manager and Player of the Month awards given to recognise the best adjudged Pro League manager and player during each month of the league season. The recipient is selected based on points accumulated from coaches, match commissioners, and the media.

== International performance ==
TT Pro League clubs have competed in international competitions organised through CONCACAF since 1999, when Joe Public qualified for the Champions' Cup. However, the Eastern Lions qualified for the competition as a member of the Semi-Professional League the previous season. After its inaugural season, the first Pro League representatives (Defence Force and W Connection) qualified based on final league position for the 2000 CFU Club Championship. Additionally, Joe Public entered the competition as the competition holders, eventually repeating as winners to qualify for the 2000 CONCACAF Champions' Cup.

Although Pro League clubs have never won the CONCACAF Champions' Cup (later renamed the Champions League), clubs have experienced success in its qualification tournament for Caribbean clubs. In fact, Pro League clubs have won the CFU Club Championship on nine occasions with an additional nine runners-up finishes — the most among any Caribbean football league. The Savonetta Boys of W Connection have enjoyed the most success having been finalists on nine occasions including three wins, which represents the most among Caribbean clubs.

Based on results during the previous calendar year, the International Federation of Football History & Statistics (IFFHS) has the Pro League currently ranked 135th in the world and 12th in CONCACAF. In addition, according to IFFHS in 2013, the highest ranked Pro League club in CONCACAF is W Connection in 56th followed by San Juan Jabloteh in 68th.

== See also ==
- Trinidad and Tobago Football Association
- Trinidad and Tobago national football team
