= 2014–15 TT Pro League =

Trinidad and Tobago football league

TT Pro League
- Season: 2014–15
- Champions: Central FC; 1st Pro League title 1st T&T title
- CFU Club Championship: Central FC; W Connection
- Matches played: 108
- Goals scored: 346 (3.2 per match)
- Top goalscorer: Devorn Jorsling (21 goals)
- Biggest home win: W Connection 6-1 Police (18 December 2014)
- Biggest away win: Rangers 0-7 Central (26 September 2014); Rangers 0-7 Defence Force (27 February 2015)
- Highest scoring: Caledonia AIA 2-6 Point Fortin Civic (16 January 2015)

The 2014–15 TT Pro League season (known as the Digicel Pro League for sponsorship reasons) was the sixteenth season of the TT Pro League, the Trinidad and Tobago professional league for association football clubs, since its establishment in 1999. A total of nine teams contested the league, with W Connection the defending champions. The season began on 23 September 2014 and ended on 2 May 2015 with the crowning of Central FC as the league champion.

== Changes from the 2013–14 season ==
The following changes were made since the 2013–14 season:

- There were a number of changes to the clubs competing in the 2014–15 season.
  - Application for admission by Club Sando to join the Pro League was rejected after failing to meet the league's financial requirements.

== Teams ==
=== Team summaries ===
Location of the 2014–15 TT Pro League teams

Note: Flags indicate national team as has been defined under FIFA eligibility rules. Players may hold more than one non-FIFA nationality.

Team	Location	Stadium	Capacity	Manager	Captain
Caledonia AIA	Morvant/Laventille	Larry Gomes Stadium	10,000	(Trinidad and Tobago) Jamaal Shabazz	(Trinidad and Tobago) Stephan David
Central FC	California	Ato Boldon Stadium	10,000	(Serbia) Zoran Vraneš	(Trinidad and Tobago) Marvin Oliver
Defence Force	Chaguaramas	Hasely Crawford Stadium	27,000	(Trinidad and Tobago) Ross Russell	(Trinidad and Tobago) Corey Rivers
North East Stars	Sangre Grande	Sangre Grande Ground	7,000	(Trinidad and Tobago) Angus Eve	(Trinidad and Tobago) Cleon John
Point Fortin Civic	Point Fortin	Mahaica Oval Pavilion	2,500	(Trinidad and Tobago) Reynold Carrington	(Trinidad and Tobago) Kelvin Modeste
Police	Saint James	Hasely Crawford Stadium	27,000	(Trinidad and Tobago) Richard Hood	(Trinidad and Tobago) Trent Noel
San Juan Jabloteh	San Juan	Hasely Crawford Stadium	27,000	(Trinidad and Tobago) Keith Jeffrey	(Jamaica) Damion Williams
St. Ann's Rangers	San Juan	Hasely Crawford Stadium	27,000	(Trinidad and Tobago) Jason Spence	(Trinidad and Tobago) Terrence Lewis
W Connection	Point Lisas	Manny Ramjohn Stadium	10,000	(Saint Lucia) Stuart Charles-Fevrier	(Saint Kitts and Nevis) Gerard Williams

=== Managerial changes ===
Team	Outgoing manager	Manner of departure	Date of vacancy	Table	Incoming manager	Date of appointment	Table
St. Ann's Rangers	(Trinidad and Tobago) Anthony Streete	End of contract	22 July 2014	9th (2013–14)	(Trinidad and Tobago) Jason Spence	22 July 2014	Pre-season

== League table ==
Pos	Team	Pld	W	D	L	GF	GA	GD	Pts	Qualification
1	Central (C)	24	17	4	3	63	19	+44	55	2016 CFU Club Championship Preliminary round
2	W Connection	24	15	4	5	47	20	+27	49	2016 CFU Club Championship Preliminary round
3	Defence Force	24	12	3	9	46	31	+15	39	
4	North East Stars	24	9	7	8	25	25	0	34	
5	Point Fortin Civic	24	10	3	11	45	43	+2	33	
6	San Juan Jabloteh	24	8	7	9	33	41	−8	31	
7	Police	24	8	6	10	35	46	−11	30	
8	Caledonia AIA	24	7	6	11	31	43	−12	27	
9	St. Ann's Rangers	24	1	2	21	21	78	−57	5	

Updated to match(es) played on 2 May 2015. Source: TT Pro League
Rules for classification: 1) points; 2) goal difference; 3) number of goals scored.
(C) Champions

=== Positions by round ===
Leader
2016 CFU Club Championship First round

The table lists the positions of teams after each week of matches. In order to preserve chronological evolvements, any postponed matches are not included to the round at which they were originally scheduled, but added to the full round they were played immediately afterwards. For example, if a match is scheduled for the tenth round of matches, but then postponed and played between rounds 16 and 17, it will be added to the standings for round 16.

Team ╲ Round	1	2	3	4	5	6	7	8	9	10	11	12	13	14	15	16	17	18	19	20	21	22	23	24
Central FC																								
W Connection																								
Defence Force																								
North East Stars																								
Point Fortin Civic																								
San Juan Jabloteh																								
Police																								
Caledonia AIA																								
St. Ann's Rangers																								

Updated to match(es) played on 1 July 2014. Source: TT Pro League

== Results ==
=== Matches 1–18 ===
Home \ Away	CAL	CEN	DEF	NES	PFC	POL	SJJ	RAN	WCO
Caledonia AIA		0–1	1–2	1–0	2–6	1–1	4–1	4–1	1–1
Central FC	3–1		2–1	1–1	3–1	2–3	2–3	4–1	1–1
Defence Force	1–3	1–0		1–0	1–1	4–2	2–1	3–2	1–2
North East Stars	2–1	0–3	0–1		1–0	3–1	2–1	1–0	0–1
Point Fortin Civic	1–2	0–1	2–1	1–3		3–1	1–2	4–1	2–1
Police	3–0	0–5	1–1	0–0	0–2		0–0	2–1	1–2
San Juan Jabloteh	1–1	0–4	2–1	1–0	2–2	2–2		1–0	1–1
St. Ann's Rangers	1–1	0–7	0–7	1–2	1–4	2–3	0–5		0–4
W Connection	3–0	0–1	2–1	0–1	3–0	6–1	1–0	4–0	

Updated to match(es) played on 1 July 2014. Source: TT Pro League
Legend: Blue = home team win; Yellow = draw; Red = away team win.

=== Matches 19–27 ===
Home \ Away	CAL	CEN	DEF	NES	PFC	POL	SJJ	RAN	WCO
Caledonia AIA		0–2	0–4					2–1	1–2
Central FC				2–1	5–2			6–1	0–0
Defence Force		1–1			4–2	0–1	1–0		
North East Stars	1–1		3–2			1–1	1–1		
Point Fortin Civic	3–1			1–1		0–3	5–1		
Police	0–1	1–4						4–3	1–2
San Juan Jabloteh	2–2	0–3				1–3			3–2
St. Ann's Rangers			2–1	1–1	1–2		1–2		
W Connection			1–4	2–0	2–0			4–0	

Updated to match(es) played on 1 July 2014. Source: TT Pro League
Legend: Blue = home team win; Yellow = draw; Red = away team win.
