= Dwight Yorke Stadium =

Football stadium in Trinidad and Tobago

Coordinates: 11.181436°N 60.716905°W

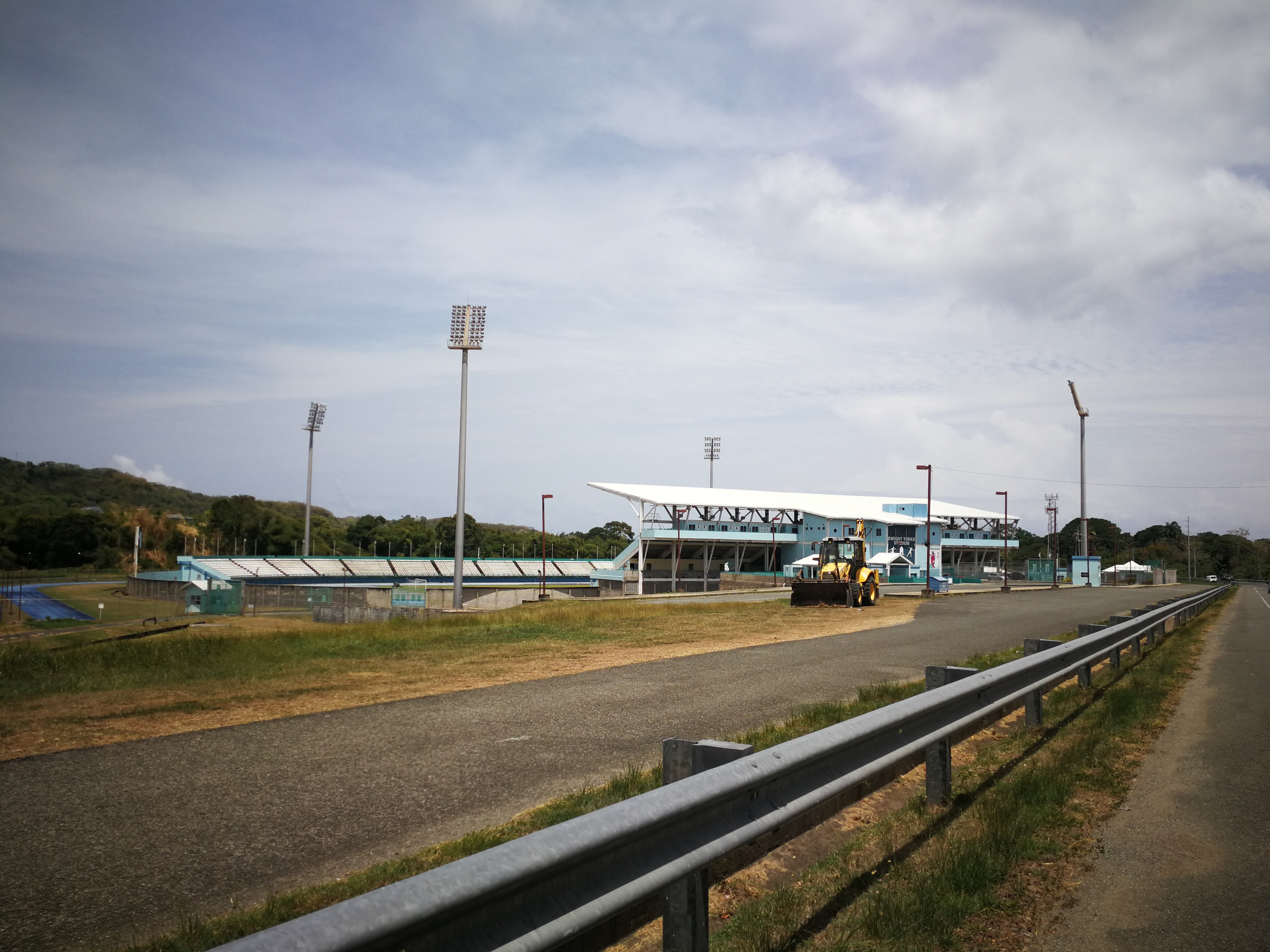
- Interactive map of Dwight Yorke Stadium
- Location: Bacolet, Scarborough, Trinidad and Tobago
- Owner: Government of Trinidad and Tobago
- Operator: Ministry of Sports
- Capacity: 7,500
- Surface: Grass

Construction
- Opened: 2001

Tenant
- Tobago United

Dwight Yorke Stadium, located in Bacolet, Scarborough, Tobago, (Trinidad and Tobago) is named after Trinidadian and Tobagonian former professional footballer Dwight Yorke. The stadium was constructed for the 2001 FIFA U-17 World Championship, which was hosted by Trinidad and Tobago. Dwight Yorke Stadium has a capacity of 7,500, it is located on the Island of Tobago, only one minute from the capital Scarborough and 25 minutes from the airport. The stadium is used by the local football team and the playing surface dimension is 105 metres x 68 metres.

The stadium hosted the 2005 Carifta Track and Field Championships and is also used for minor Tobagonian athletics events.

It also hosted games from the 2010 FIFA U-17 Women's World Cup.
