= Arima Fire =

Arima Fire is an association football club from Trinidad and Tobago. Their home ground is the Larry Gomes Stadium, and the club has previously competed in the TT Pro League.
