= Gefferson Goulart =

Brazilian footballer (born 1978)

Personal information
- Full name: Gefferson da Silva Goulart
- Date of birth: 9 January 1978 (age 48)
- Place of birth: São Gonçalo, Brazil
- Height: 1.80 m (5 ft 11 in)
- Position: Midfielder

Senior career*
Years	Team	Apps	(Gls)
1997	União São João	10	(1)
2000–2003	W Connection		
2004	Železnik	28	(3)
2005	W Connection		
2006	Busan IPark	5	(1)
2006–2007	W Connection		
2008–2009	Libolo		
2012	Penapolense		
- * Club domestic league appearances and goals

Gefferson da Silva Goulart (born 9 January 1978), commonly known as Gefferson Goulart, is a Brazilian former professional footballer who played as a midfielder.

== Career ==
Gefferson played with União São João in 1997. By 2000 he settled in Trinidad and Tobago playing with W Connection. Between January and December 2004, Gefferson and his compatriot and W Connection teammate Ronaldo Viana played on loan with Serbian side FK Železnik in the First League of Serbia and Montenegro. The club was performing well those years, and Gefferson got the chance to play in the 2004–05 UEFA Cup narrowly losing against Steaua by a goal difference in the overall of the two legs. He also played a game in the 2004–05 Serbia and Montenegro Cup contributing for the conquest of the cup title that year.

Gefferson and Ronaldo both returned from Serbia by the end of 2004 and were included in the W Connection team for their 2005 campaign. Already before having their stint in Europe, Gefferson and Ronaldo were key-players in the 5 seasons they had spent with W Connection before 2004, and helped the club win two championships as well as several trophies. Further more, upon its return, Gefferson won one more TT Pro League with W Connection and also the Golden Boot and Player of the Year award in 2005.

Later, he had a spell in South Korea with Busan IPark, and in Angola with Libolo.

== Career statistics ==
Club	Season	League		Cup		Continental		Total	
Club	Season	Apps	Goals	Apps	Goals	Apps	Goals	Apps	Goals
Železnik	2003–04	15	2	1	0	0	0	16	2
Železnik	2004–05	13	1	1	0	2	2	16	3
Železnik	Total	28	3	2	0	2	2	32	5

== Honours ==
W Connection

- TT Pro League: 2000, 2001, 2005
- Trinidad and Tobago Cup: 2001
- Trinidad and Tobago Pro Bowl: 2001, 2002
- CFU Club Championship: 2002

Železnik

- Serbia and Montenegro Cup: 2005

Individual

- TT Pro League Golden Boot: 2005 (14 goals, title shared with Earl Jean)
- TT Pro League player of the year: 2005
