= Randolph Jerome =

Guyanese footballer

Randy Jerome
Personal information
- Full name: Randolph Jerome
- Date of birth: February 2, 1978 (age 48)
- Place of birth: Guyana
- Height: 6 ft 0 in (1.83 m)
- Position: Forward

Senior career*
Years	Team	Apps	(Gls)
1997–2000	Doc’s Khelwalaas FC	?	(34)
2001	Caledonia AIA	7	(4)
2002–2003	North East Stars		(32)
2004	South Starworld Strikers	26	(16)
2004–2005	Al-Mabarrah	20	(10)
2005	W Connection	9	(2)
2006	South Starworld Strikers		(8)
2007–2008	North East Stars		(13)
2008	Cleveland City Stars	13	(1)
2009	Pittsburgh Riverhounds	7	(2)
2009	→ Caledonia AIA (loan)	3	(1)
2010–2011	North East Stars		(0)

International career
1999–	Guyana	17	(7)
- * Club domestic league appearances and goals

Randolph Jerome (born February 2, 1978) is a Guyanese former professional soccer player who played as a forward.

== Club career ==
Jerome began his career in Trinidad with Doc’s Khelwalaas, before moving to league rival Caledonia AIA. He transferred to play for North East Stars in 2002 and in 2003 28 goals to lead the league and claim the Golden Boot award.

In the 2004 season, Jerome moved to South Starworld Strikers where he scored 16 goals, second in the league behind Jerren Nixon. After that, Jerome played for seven months in Lebanon for Al-Mabarra, scoring 10 times in League games and 4 times in the Cup and honouring as Lebanese Cup winner, before returning to Trinidad to play for W Connection and a second stint with South Starworld Strikers.

In January 2006 Jerome made several attempts to break into the US soccer market, attending trials with several clubs, including Virginia Beach Mariners, but was not picked up by any of the teams. He played for the North East Stars again in 2007, before being signed by the Cleveland City Stars in 2008. He helped the Stars to the USL Second Division championship in 2008, before signing for the Pittsburgh Riverhounds for the 2009 season. Following the conclusion of the 2009 USL2 season, Jerome was loaned to Caledonia AIA in the TT Pro League.

== International career ==
Between 1991 and 2003 Jerome played for various men's national teams for Guyana. During his teen years he played for the Under-14, Under-16, and Under-17 teams. He later captained the Under-21 and Under-23 teams, the latter of which he captained during Olympic qualifying in 1999. Jerome played for Guyana in the inter Guyana games in 1995. In 2000, he was capped to the senior national team to represent them in World Cup qualification.
