= Makesi Lewis =

Trinidad and Tobago footballer

Personal information
- Full name: Makesi Jobari Lewis
- Date of birth: 11 July 1986 (age 40)
- Place of birth: Trinidad and Tobago
- Position: Striker

Senior career*
Years	Team	Apps	(Gls)
2011/2012	Morvant Caledonia United		(1)
	Police F.C.		(28+)

International career
2016	Trinidad and Tobago	3	(0)
- * Club domestic league appearances and goals

Makesi Jobari Lewis (born 11 July 1986 in Trinidad and Tobago) is a Trinidadian retired footballer.

== Career ==
After playing for Oakland University in the United States, Lewis returned to Trinidad and Tobago with Morvant Caledonia United, before signing for Police because he expressed interest in becoming a policeman.

In 2016, he and his brother, Micah, almost sealed a move to Turkish top flight side Antalyaspor but it never happened.

In 2015/16, Lewis was top scorer of the Trinidadian top flight with Police, earning him three appearances with the Trinidad and Tobago national team.
