= Tobago United F.C. =

Tobago United
- Full name: Tobago United Football Club
- Nickname: The Tobago Boys
- Dissolved: 2011; 15 years ago
- Ground: Dwight Yorke Stadium; Tobago, Trinidad and Tobago
- Capacity: 10,000
- Chairman: Claude Benoit
- Manager: Peter Granville
- League: TT Pro League
- 2010–11: TT Pro League, 11th
Home colours

Tobago United Football Club was a football club from Trinidad and Tobago, that played in Professional Football League of Trinidad.

The team's home stadium was Dwight Yorke Stadium, 3 km from Scarborough, Tobago's main town.

== History ==
Ensuring survival was the main ambition for the Trinidad and Tobago TT Pro League side Tobago United. Since they joined the league in 2003, Tobago United finished bottom in every season between 2003 and 2008. The club managed to avoid bottom place in 2009 with help from former Manchester United and Trinidad and Tobago national football team forward Dwight Yorke. However due to financial issues they were expelled from the TT Pro League on the 16th of September 2010, and have since disbanded.
