= Sangre Grande Regional Complex =

Coordinates: 10°35′57.11″N 61°07′50.67″W

Sangre Grande Regional Complex is a multi-use stadium in Sangre Grande, Trinidad and Tobago. It is currently used mostly for football matches. It was the home stadium of North East Stars, until they moved to Port of Spain in 2020. The stadium holds 7,100 people.

It is widely considered to be a white elephant. It had been “sparingly used," was closed for repairs, and was set to reopen in May 2024. It re-opened, but was closed again in September 2024 for repairs once more.
