= Point Fortin Civic F.C. =

Point Fortin Civic
- Full name: Point Fortin Civic Football Club
- Ground: Mahaica Oval Pavilion; Point Fortin, Trinidad and Tobago
- Capacity: 2,500
- Manager: Reynold Carrington
- League: TT Pro League
- 2025–26: TT Pro League, 11th
Home colours	Away colours

Point Fortin Civic F.C. is a Trinidad and Tobago professional football club, based in Point Fortin, that plays in the TT Pro League.

Point Fortin Civic applied for admission and were accepted back in the Pro League after a being expelled following the league's inaugural season.

== Stadium ==
The club plays its home matches in Mahaica Oval Pavilion located in Point Fortin.

== Honours ==
- Trinidad and Tobago Cup:

1969

== Current squad ==
Note: Flags indicate national team as defined under FIFA eligibility rules; some limited exceptions apply. Players may hold more than one non-FIFA nationality.

No.	Pos.	Nation	Player
2		TTO	Altinus Thatcher
3		TTO	Boston Anthony
6		TTO	Geraldus Francis
7		TTO	Basil Douglas
8		TTO	Ennius Holding
9	FW	TTO	Sammy Wellington
11	FW	TTO	Melvin Emerald
13		TTO	Diamantinus Woodstock
14		TTO	Jamal Merlyn
15		TTO	Quillyan Geralds
17		TTO	Justyn Lawrence
18		TTO	Luther Currency
19	MF	TTO	Clancy Moordale

No.	Pos.	Nation	Player
20		TTO	Ayush Choudhury
21		TTO	Devis Pickering
22		TTO	Anil Dhuduwar
23		TTO	Gustavus Wyoming
27		TTO	Shaun Portland
29		TTO	Raheem Tank
30		TTO	Jarbas Truesdale
33		TTO	Deniel Everett
35		TTO	Jeorge Thomas
—		TTO	Irving Kendell
—		TTO	Vespucius Appleton
—		TTO	Khalifa Byrne
—		TTO	Dedreck Cooper
—		TTO	Desmond Seattle
—		TTO	Redginald Vernon
