= Anthony Wolfe =

Trinidadian professional footballer

Anthony Wolfe CM
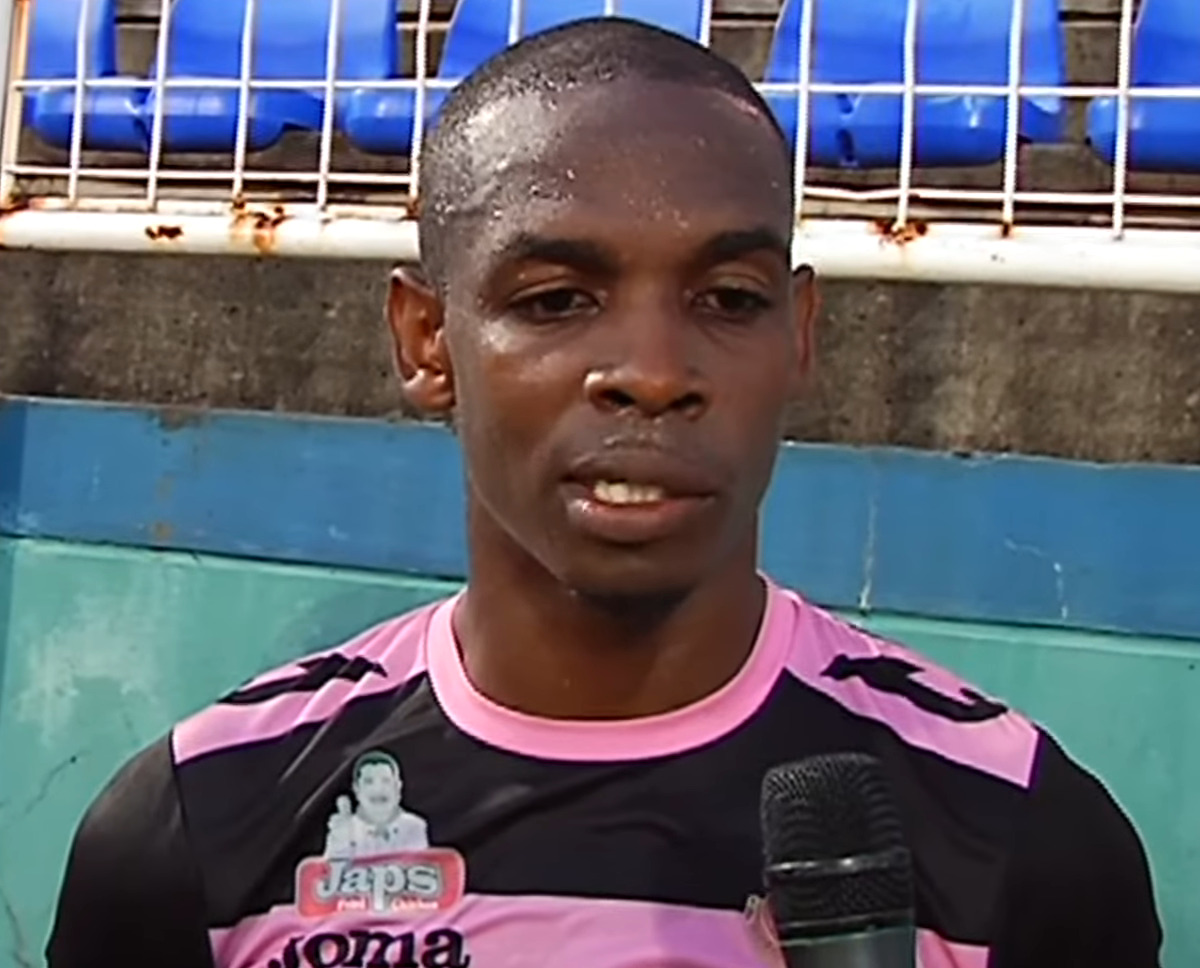
- Wolfe at an interview as a Ma Pau player in 2016

Personal information
- Full name: Anthony Wolfe
- Date of birth: 23 December 1983 (age 42)
- Place of birth: Manzanilla, Trinidad and Tobago
- Height: 1.75 m (5 ft 9 in)
- Position: Forward

Senior career*
Years	Team	Apps	(Gls)
2002–2005	North East Stars		
2006	San Juan Jabloteh	26	(16)
2007	Atlanta Silverbacks	3	(1)
2007–2008	North East Stars	22	(11)
2009–2010	Ma Pau	26	(15)
2010–2012	North East Stars		(9)
2012–2013	Central		(3)
2013–2014	North East Stars		
2014	Churchill Brothers	11	(3)
2014–2015	Sporting Goa	18	(4)
2015–2016	North East Stars		
2016	Ma Pau		(1)
2017	Churchill Brothers	17	(4)
2017	Tollygunge Agragami		
2018	Central		
2018	Peerless	11	(5)
2018–2019	Churchill Brothers	14	(5)
2019–2020	Peerless		

International career
2003–2011	Trinidad and Tobago	35	(3)
- * Club domestic league appearances and goals

Anthony Wolfe CM (born 23 December 1983) is a Trinidadian former professional footballer who played as a forward. He played for the Trinidad and Tobago national team on 35 occasions.

As a member of the squad that competed at the 2006 FIFA World Cup in Germany, he was awarded the Chaconia Medal (Gold Class), the second highest state decoration of Trinidad and Tobago.

== Club career ==
Wolfe started his career at North East Stars, with whom he clinched the league title in 2004, scoring eight goals for them in the process. He then moved to San Juan Jabloteh at the start of the 2006 season and became that seasons's joint-top goalscorer with 16 goals, which earned him a move to the Atlanta Silverbacks in the USL First Division. He only played three games for them, scoring one goal, in his lone season.

Wolfe first came to India in 2014 and joined I-League side Churchill Brothers for a season. He made his debut in the on 11 February 2014 against Rangdajied United at the Tilak Maidan Stadium, in which he scored the only goal. He again played for the Goan-side for a season in 2017. He also played for Sporting Clube de Goa, another I-League club. In 2017, he moved to Tollygunge Agragami on loan transfer from Churchill and appeared in Calcutta Football League matches.

Wolfe has appeared with Indian club Peerless SC in the Calcutta Premier Division and has had two spells with the club. In 2019, Peerless created history after winning the 2019–20 Calcutta Premier Division, defeating their archrivals; three Kolkata giants and he was in the title winning squad.

== International career ==
Wolfe was considered a surprise inclusion in the Trinidad and Tobago national team for the 2006 FIFA World Cup.

He represented Trinidad and Tobago 35 times, making his debut on 29 January 2003, against Finland in a 2–1 defeat.

== Career statistics ==
Scores and results list Trinidad and Tobago's goal tally first, score column indicates score after each Wolfe goal.

List of international goals scored by Anthony Wolfe
No.	Date	Venue	Opponent	Score	Result	Competition
1	17 July 2008	Marvin Lee Stadium, Macoya, Trinidad and Tobago	Netherlands Antilles	2–0	2–0	Friendly
2	14 August 2008	Robert F. Kennedy Memorial Stadium, Washington D.C., United States	El Salvador	2–1	3–1	Friendly
3	8 October 2008	Hasely Crawford Stadium, Port of Spain, Trinidad and Tobago	Dominican Republic	8–0	9–0	Friendly

== Honours ==
North East Stars

- TT Pro League: 2004

Central

- Trinidad and Tobago FA Trophy: runner-up 2012–13

Peerless

- Calcutta Football League: 2019

Individual

- Topscorer of TT Pro League: 2006 (with 16 goals)
- Chaconia Medal Gold Class: 2006

== See also ==
- List of Chaconia Medal recipients
