= Earl Jean =

Saint Lucian footballer (born 1971)

Personal information
- Full name: Earl Jude Jean
- Date of birth: 9 October 1971 (age 55)
- Place of birth: Castries, Saint Lucia
- Height: 5 ft 8 in (1.73 m)
- Position: Striker

Senior career*
Years	Team	Apps	(Gls)
1991–1992	Oliveirense	11	(0)
1992–1993	União de Coimbra	12	(0)
1993–1995	Leça	55	(18)
1995–1996	Felgueiras	21	(1)
1996–1997	Ipswich Town	1	(0)
1997	Rotherham United	18	(6)
1997–1999	Plymouth Argyle	65	(7)
1999	W Connection	19	(11)
2000	Hibernian	5	(0)
2000–2002	W Connection	33	(34)
2002	Hefei Chuangyi	9	(0)
2003–2007	W Connection	?	(45)
2008–2009	San Juan Jabloteh	1	(0)
Total		250	(122)

International career
1990–2004	Saint Lucia	23	(20)

Managerial career
- 2009: San Juan Jabloteh
- 2010–: W Connection
- * Club domestic league appearances and goals

Earl Jude Jean (born 9 October 1971) is a Saint Lucian former professional footballer who played as a striker. He made 21 appearances in the Primeira Divisão for Felgueiras, 84 in the Football League for Ipswich Town, Rotherham United and Plymouth Argyle, and five in the Scottish Premier League for Hibernian. Jean played for Saint Lucia at full international level.

== Club career ==
=== Ipswich ===
Jean famously told the local media that despite his short stature he could leap very high - he was therefore nicknamed 'The Flea'. In December 1996 he made his only appearance for Ipswich Town, coming on as a substitute in a 1–1 home draw against Stoke City.

=== Rotherham ===
Jean was leading scorer for Rotherham United F.C. during the 1996–97 season, prior to moving to Plymouth Argyle F.C. in 1997.

== International career ==
Jean was a member of the Saint Lucia national team from 1990 to 2004.

== Coaching career ==
After his retirement in December 2009 Jean began his coaching career as assistant coach of his former Saint Lucia national team head coach Stuart Charles Fevrier by W Connection.

== Career statistics ==
=== International ===
Scores and results list Saint Lucia's goal tally first, score column indicates score after each Jean goal.

List of international goals scored by Earl Jean
No.	Date	Venue	Opponent	Score	Result	Competition
1	27 May 1990	St. John's, Antigua and Barbuda	Antigua and Barbuda	1–0	2–0	1990 Caribbean Cup
2	27 May 1990	St. John's, Antigua and Barbuda	Antigua and Barbuda	2–0	2–0	1990 Caribbean Cup
3	16 May 1991	Castries, Saint Lucia	Anguilla	2–0	6–0	1991 Caribbean Cup
4	16 May 1991	Castries, Saint Lucia	Anguilla	5–0	6–0	1991 Caribbean Cup
5	16 May 1991	Castries, Saint Lucia	Anguilla	6–0	6–0	1991 Caribbean Cup
6	2 June 1991	Kingston, Jamaica	Guyana		4–1	1991 Caribbean Cup
7	22 March 1992	Castries, Saint Lucia	Saint Vincent and the Grenadines	1–0	1–0	1994 FIFA World Cup qualification
8	29 March 1992	Kingstown, St. Vincent and the Grenadines	Saint Vincent and the Grenadines	1–0	1–3	1994 FIFA World Cup qualification
9	5 May 1996	Basseterre, St. Kitts and Nevis	Saint Kitts and Nevis	1–4	1–5	1998 FIFA World Cup qualification
10	14 March 2001	St. George's, Grenada	Grenada		3–4	Friendly
11	10 April 2001	Port-au-Prince, Haiti	Guadeloupe		3–2	2001 Caribbean Cup
12	10 April 2001	Port-au-Prince, Haiti	Haiti		2–3	2001 Caribbean Cup
13	14 April 2001	Port-au-Prince, Haiti	U.S. Virgin Islands		14–1	2001 Caribbean Cup
14	14 April 2001	Port-au-Prince, Haiti	U.S. Virgin Islands		14–1	2001 Caribbean Cup
15	14 April 2001	Port-au-Prince, Haiti	U.S. Virgin Islands		14–1	2001 Caribbean Cup
16	14 April 2001	Port-au-Prince, Haiti	U.S. Virgin Islands		14–1	2001 Caribbean Cup
17	14 April 2001	Port-au-Prince, Haiti	U.S. Virgin Islands		14–1	2001 Caribbean Cup
18	30 March 2003	Kingston, Jamaica	Martinique	3–1	4–5	2003 CONCACAF Gold Cup qualification
19	28 March 2004	Vieux Fort, Saint Lucia	British Virgin Islands	3–0	9–0	2006 FIFA World Cup qualification
20	28 March 2004	Vieux Fort, Saint Lucia	British Virgin Islands	5–0	9–0	2006 FIFA World Cup qualification
