= Jerren Nixon =

Trinidad and Tobago footballer (born 1973)

Personal information
- Full name: Jerren Kendall Nixon
- Date of birth: 25 June 1973 (age 53)
- Place of birth: Morvant, Trinidad and Tobago
- Position: Forward

Senior career*
Years	Team	Apps	(Gls)
1991	Airport Authority		
1993	ECM Motown		
1993–1995	Dundee United	43	(6)
1995–1999	FC Zürich	95	(19)
1999–2000	Yverdon-Sport	9	(1)
2000–2003	St. Gallen	37	(8)
2003–2005	North East Stars	72	(56)

International career
1993–2004	Trinidad & Tobago	38	(11)
- * Club domestic league appearances and goals

Jerren Kendall Nixon (born 25 June 1973) is a Trinidadian former professional footballer who played as a forward. After beginning his career with Trinidadian clubs Airport Authority and ECM Motown, Nixon signed for Dundee United in 1993, where he won the Scottish Cup in his first season. In 1995, he joined FC Zürich and went on to spend eight years playing in Switzerland, where he also had spells with Yverdon-Sport and FC St. Gallen. He ended his career back in Trinidad with North East Stars, where he was also interim head coach for a time. Nixon made 38 international appearances for Trinidad and Tobago between 1993 and 2004, twice playing at the CONCACAF Gold Cup.

== Career ==
Born in the village of Morvant, just outside Port of Spain, Nixon began his career in Trinidad playing for ECM Motown before moving to Scotland in 1993, joining Dundee United. Impressive early form for the Tannadice Park side prompted then manager Ivan Golac to declare he would one day be worth £20 million. Nixon later said that Golac's inflated valuation of him hampered his career. He helped the club to win the 1993–94 Scottish Cup, but left a year later for £200,000 after they were relegated from the Premier Division. He spent the next eight years of his career in Swiss football, with FC Zürich, Yverdon-Sport FC and FC St. Gallen.

In 2003 Nixon returned to Trinidad after a trial with Dallas Burn failed to lead to a contract. He joined North East Stars, winning the league title in 2004, and finishing as top scorer. In September 2005, he was appointed as interim coach of the club.

Nixon has represented his country at every level from Under-17 to full international. He made his full debut for the Trinidad and Tobago national team in 1993, and made his last appearance in 2004.

== Career statistics ==
=== International ===
Scores and results list Trinidad and Tobago's goal tally first, score column indicates score after each Nixon goal.

List of international goals scored by Jerren Nixon
No.	Date	Venue	Opponent	Score	Result	Competition
1	7 June 1996	Hasely Crawford Stadium, Port of Spain, Trindiad and Tobago	Cuba	?–0	2–0	1996 Caribbean Cup
2	6 October 1996	Hasely Crawford Stadium, Port of Spain, Trinidad and Tobago	Guatemala	1–1	1–1	1998 FIFA World Cup qualification
3	21 December 1996	Estadio José Rafael Fello Meza Ivankovich, Cartago, Costa Rica	Costa Rica	1–0	1–2	1998 FIFA World Cup qualification
4	1 May 1997	Palo Seco Velodrome, Palo Seco, Mali	Jamaica	1–0	1–1	Friendly
5	8 July 1997	Warner Park Sporting Complex, Basseterre, Saint Kitts and Nevis	Saint Kitts and Nevis	1–0	3–0	1997 Caribbean Cup
6	8 July 1997	Warner Park Sporting Complex, Basseterre, Saint Kitts and Nevis	Saint Kitts and Nevis	3–0	3–0	1997 Caribbean Cup
7	13 July 1997	Antigua Recreation Ground, St. John's, Antigua and Barbuda	Saint Kitts and Nevis	1–0	4–0	1997 Caribbean Cup
8	31 August 1997	Independence Park, Kingston, Jamaica	Jamaica	1–?	1–6	Friendly
9	1 February 1998	Oakland Coliseum, Oakland, United States	Honduras	1–0	3–1	1998 CONCACAF Gold Cup
10	4 February 1998	Oakland Coliseum, Oakland, California	Mexico	2–3	2–4	1998 CONCACAF Gold Cup
11	10 October 2004	Manny Ramjohn Stadium, Marabella, Trinidad and Tobago	Saint Kitts and Nevis	5–1	5–1	2006 FIFA World Cup qualification

== Honours ==
Dundee United

- Scottish Cup: 1993–94

North East Stars

- TT Pro League: 2004

Individual

- TT Pro League top scorer: 2004
