= South Starworld Strikers F.C. =

South Starworld Strikers
- Full name: South Starworld Strikers Football Club
- Founded: c.1987
- Dissolved: 2006
- Ground: Ato Boldon Stadium; Couva, Trinidad and Tobago
- Capacity: 10,000
- League: TT Pro League
- 2006: TT Pro League, 9th (club disbanded)
| Home colours | Away colours |

South Starworld Strikers Football Club was a professional football team, which played in Trinidad and Tobago's Professional Football League. The club played their home matches in Ato Boldon Stadium, in Couva, Trinidad.

== History ==
The club competed in Trinidad's Southern Football Association for 15 years following their founding. As they dominated the league with ease, they played in the Goodwill League tournament in the United States in 2001 rather than competing in the league. They joined the TT Pro League in 2002, as the first San Fernando team to play in the league, and owner/manager Ahmeed Anthony Ali said "we will win it".

The club finished its first season with 4 wins, 10 ties, and 14 losses, finishing seventh out of eight teams. They improved significantly in their second season, however, going 17–7–12 and finishing fourth in the league. They maintained a similar standing in 2004, again finishing fourth, this time with a 10–6–5 record. In 2005, they did not compete, but they were back again in the 2006 season as San Fernando Starworld Strikers. They left the league in 2006 due to financial difficulties, and were replaced by Super League champions Police FC. The club subsequently disbanded.
