= Devorn Jorsling =

Trinidadian footballer (born 1983)

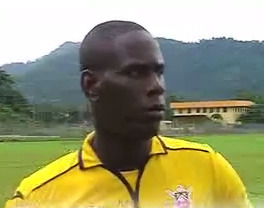
- Jorsling after a match with Defence Force in 2016

Personal information
- Date of birth: 27 December 1983 (age 42)
- Place of birth: Morvant, Trinidad and Tobago
- Position: Forward

Senior career*
Years	Team	Apps	(Gls)
2000–2001	W Connection		
2001	Caledonia AIA	3	(0)
2002–2010	Defence Force		(84)
2011	Orlando City	16	(3)
2011–2012	Caledonia AIA		(8)
2013–2020	Defence Force		

International career
2007–2015	Trinidad and Tobago	37	(17)
- * Club domestic league appearances and goals

Devorn Jorsling (born 27 December 1983) is a Trinidadian former footballer who played as a forward.

== Club career ==
=== Early career ===
Jorsling was born in Morvant. He played extensively in the TT Pro League, initially with W Connection and Caledonia AIA, but most prominently Defence Force, with whom he played for eight seasons.

He was part of the Defence Force squad which won T&T Pro League title in 2010/2011, won a First Citizens Cup winner's medal in 2009, won the Trinidad and Tobago Cup in 2005, and won the T&T Pro League Golden Boot Award in 2008, tallying 21 goals. He also played for the team in their 2002 CONCACAF Champions' Cup first round loss to Pachuca.

=== Orlando City ===
On 27 January 2011 Jorsling signed with Orlando City S.C. of the USL Pro league in the United States.

=== Caledonia AIA ===
After his stint with Orlando City in 2011, Jorsling returned to Trinidad to play for the national team in November 2011. He also returned to the TT Pro League, playing for Caledonia AIA, as a striker.

== International career ==
Jorsling made his debut for the Trinidad and Tobago national team in 2007, and scored his first international goal on 19 September 2010 in a 1–0 friendly win over Antigua and Barbuda. He also scored a hat trick in his team's 6–2 win over St. Vincent and the Grenadines in the 2010 Caribbean Championship

== Career statistics ==
#	Date	Venue	Opponent	Score	Result	Competition
1	19 September 2010	Saint John's	Antigua and Barbuda	1–0	Win	Friendly match
2	21 September 2010	Saint John's	Saint Lucia	3–0	Win	Friendly match
3	26 September 2010	Providence	Guyana	1–1	Draw	Friendly match
4	2 November 2010	Marabella	Saint Vincent and the Grenadines	6–2	Win	2010 Caribbean Championship
5	2 November 2010	Marabella	Saint Vincent and the Grenadines	6–2	Win	2010 Caribbean Championship
6	2 November 2010	Marabella	Saint Vincent and the Grenadines	6–2	Win	2010 Caribbean Championship
7	4 November 2010	Marabella	Guyana	2–1	Win	2010 Caribbean Championship
8	6 November 2010	Marabella	Haiti	4–0	Win	2010 Caribbean Championship

== Honours ==
Orlando City

- USL Pro: 2011
