= Kerry Baptiste =

Trinidadian football striker

Personal information
- Date of birth: 1 December 1981 (age 44)
- Place of birth: Carenage, Trinidad and Tobago
- Height: 1.76 m (5 ft 9 in)
- Position: Second striker

Senior career*
Years	Team	Apps	(Gls)
2003–2006	San Juan Jabloteh		(41)
2007–2010	Joe Public	92	(69)
2011	FC Tampa Bay	5	(0)
2011–2012	T&TEC SC	4	(2)
2012–2013	North East Stars		(3)
2013–2015	San Juan Jabloteh		(17)
2015–2016	Central F.C.		(0)
2015–2016	North East Stars		(11)
2016–2017	Ma Pau Stars		(5)
2017	North East Stars		(4)
2017–2018	Central F.C.	0	(0)
2018–2019	La Horquetta Rangers (Note: "St. Ann's Rangers" until 2018)		(5)
2019–2020	Police II		(5)

International career
2003–2010	Trinidad and Tobago	51	(12)
- * Club domestic league appearances and goals

Kerry Baptiste (born 1 December 1981) is a Trinidadian former professional who played as a second striker.

== Club career ==
First signed with Joe Public in March 2007 on a two-year deal. In December 2009, he was offered a trial at Ipswich Town in the Football League Championship of England. In May 2010, he joined Major League Soccer club Toronto FC on trial. In January 2011, Baptiste rejected a contract offer from Joe Public after he was looking to take on a new challenge. He was on trial with Seattle Sounders FC of MLS but was not signed.

Baptiste eventually signed in July 2011 with FC Tampa Bay of the North American Soccer League.

== International career ==
Baptiste has graduated from the National Under 20 team which he played for at the 2001 CONCACAF qualifiers in T&T and was also a member of the Under 23 team.

== Career statistics ==
=== International ===
Scores and results list Trinidad and Tobago's goal tally first, score column indicates score after each Baptiste goal.

List of international goals scored by Kerry Baptiste
No.	Date	Venue	Opponent	Score	Result	Competition
1	7 October 2006	Hasely Crawford Stadium, Port of Spain, Trinidad and Tobago	Saint Vincent and the Grenadines	5–0	5–0	Friendly
2	15 January 2007	Hasely Crawford Stadium, Port of Spain, Trinidad and Tobago	Martinique	2–1	5–1	2007 Caribbean Cup
3	15 January 2007	Hasely Crawford Stadium, Port of Spain, Trinidad and Tobago	Martinique	4–1	5–1	2007 Caribbean Cup
4	26 January 2008	Juan Ramón Loubriel Stadium, Bayamón, Puerto Rico	Puerto Rico	1–2	2–2	Friendly
5	12 July 2009	Warner Park, Basseterre, Saint Kitts and Nevis	Saint Kitts and Nevis	3–2	3–2	Friendly
6	5 September 2009	Estadio Olímpico Metropolitano, San Pedro Sula, Honduras	Honduras	1–4	1–4	2010 FIFA World Cup qualification
7	14 October 2009	Hasely Crawford Stadium, Port of Spain, Trinidad and Tobago	Mexico	1–0	2–2	2010 FIFA World Cup qualification
8	14 October 2009	Hasely Crawford Stadium, Port of Spain, Trinidad and Tobago	Mexico	2–1	2–2	2010 FIFA World Cup qualification
9	21 June 2010	Marvin Lee Stadium, Macoya, Trinidad and Tobago	Antigua and Barbuda	2–0	4–1	Friendly
10	2 November 2010	Manny Ramjohn Stadium, Marabella, Trinidad and Tobago	Saint Vincent and the Grenadines	3–2	6–2	2010 Caribbean Cup qualification
11	2 November 2010	Manny Ramjohn Stadium, Marabella, Trinidad and Tobago	Saint Vincent and the Grenadines	5–2	6–2	2010 Caribbean Cup qualification
12	6 November 2010	Manny Ramjohn Stadium, Marabella, Trinidad and Tobago	Haiti	3–0	4–0	2010 Caribbean Cup qualification
