= History of the TT Pro League =

The history of the TT Pro League (formerly known as the Professional Football League) has its roots spanning back to the 1970s and 1980s when Trinidad and Tobago experienced an upswing in support for its domestic football. Several of the national team players featured for Defence Force during its dominance of the National League, which included the Teteron Boys becoming the first Trinidadian and only second club from CONCACAF to accomplish the continental treble in 1985. In addition, the national team also rose to prominence in the late 1980s after falling short by one match of qualification for the nation's first FIFA World Cup in 1989. Optimism for the growth and community interest of football in Trinidad and Tobago was at an all-time high. However, the early 1990s would mark a low point in Trinidad and Tobago football. In 1993, after a streak of poor performances, the Soca Warriors gave its worst ever showing in the 1993 Caribbean Cup after finishing a disappointing third, which was preceded by an early exit from its '94 for Sure campaign to qualify for the 1994 FIFA World Cup hosted in the United States.

In response to the downward trend in the sport, several initiatives were implemented by the Trinidad and Tobago Football Association to repair its credibility and return confidence among the clubs and businesses to support domestic football. In 1994, the Football Association secured a four-year agreement with Umbro to sponsor the national team with equipment and apparel. This was soon followed by an announcement that local beer manufacturers Carib agreed to become the title sponsor of the National League, which included the injection of prize money for the first time in domestic football. The following year, Trinidadian and former FIFA vice-president Jack Warner proposed that the creation of a professional football league in Trinidad and Tobago was needed to strengthen its national team and improve the development of its domestic players. In order to establish a professional football league in the country, the Football Association created the Semi-Professional League in 1996 to provide teams and players a three-year period to meet admission criteria and transition to life in a professional league.

The league's inaugural season of the all-professional league, called the Professional Football League, was held in 1999 and became the first professional football league in the Caribbean. Eight clubs contested the league's first season with Defence Force continuing a theme set during the National League and Semi-Professional League years by winning the club's twentieth league championship. The league's first year also witnessed the rise of several domestic stars including Arnold Dwarika after the Eastern Lion scored 45 league goals. However, after three years, the Professional Football League ceased operations following a decision from its owner and founder, Jack Warner, to withdraw funding for the league in February 2002. After early positive results, club owners agreed a month later to develop a new professional league and formed a limited company known as the T&T Pro League Limited owned by the member clubs and a continuation of the Professional Football League. Although operating rather as a corporation, the TT Pro League continued to see several of its initial homegrown players depart for more prominent leagues in Europe and North America. However, their departures ultimately benefited the league as the Trinidad and Tobago national team, composed of several current and former Pro League players, qualified for the nation's first FIFA World Cup in November 2005. Consequently, the league garnered praise for its development of homegrown professional footballers and implemented a series of marketing plans to establish itself as a viable professional league.

== Origins ==
=== Early history (1974–1989) ===
Prior to the 1990s, professionalism in Trinidad and Tobago football was non-existent. In the 1970s and 1980s, domestic clubs fielding primarily amateur players competed in the National League, which served as the country's highest level in the Trinidad and Tobago football league system from 1974 to 1995. During its twenty-two year existence, the league was dominated by Defence Force, composed of players serving as officers, soldiers, and sailors in the Trinidad and Tobago Defence Force, with the club claiming fifteen (15) championships. In 1978, Defence Force became the first Trinidad and Tobago club to win the CONCACAF Champions' Cup. However, the Teteron Boys' most successful campaign came in 1985, when the club became the first Caribbean and only second team in CONCACAF to accomplish the continental treble after winning the National League, FA Trophy, and CONCACAF Champions' Cup.

Following the rise of domestic football within Trinidad and Tobago, the national team backed by several experienced and talented players came within one game of qualification for the 1990 FIFA World Cup in Italy. Nicknamed the Strike Squad during its qualification campaign, the national team needed only a draw in their final game played at home against the United States on 19 November 1989. In front of an over-capacity crowd of more than 50,000 at the National Stadium on what later would be known as Red Day, Paul Caligiuri of the United States scored the only goal of the match in the 30th minute dashing the Soca Warriors' qualification hopes. Although suffering from its disappointing loss, optimism for the country's first appearance at the World Cup was at an all-time high.

=== Low point in Trinidadian football (1990–1993) ===
The early 1990s marked a low point in Trinidad and Tobago football. With its suspicious failure in 1989 still clouding the atmosphere, the national team began its qualification for the 1994 FIFA World Cup with the theme '94 for Sure. However, after a 2–1 loss and 1–1 draw to Jamaica the Soca Warriors made an early exit from qualification. Moreover, this was followed by a streak of poor performances that ended with the national team giving its worst ever showing in the 1993 Caribbean Cup after finishing a disappointing third and failing to qualify for the CONCACAF Gold Cup. In the aftermath, the Trinidad and Tobago Football Association came under close scrutiny and the public demanded an explanation for the decline in the national team's performance. Brian Ghent, an unapologetic critic of the Football Association who later became a member of the Finance Committee, stated in 1993:

After what happened in 1989, people have begun to see what could have been achieved. As a result, the Association came under close scrutiny. I feel the instability of the last few years have been a necessary evil and it might have been necessary to take two steps backwards to move forward.

— Brian Ghent, interview for the Trinidad and Tobago Guardian.

Trinidadian and former FIFA vice-president Jack Warner also spoke out describing Trinidad and Tobago's football as being "in shambles", crowd support was "non-existent", and that people were "depressed". After a series of false starts, Football Association administrators and clubs came together on a plan to construct a new constitution in November 1993. The document helped ease much of the tension surrounding the Football Association after the constitution expressed the ideals of "one club, one vote" to eliminate some of the negativity attached to the sport and return confidence among the clubs and businesses.

== Foundation ==
=== Drive towards professionalism (1994–1995) ===
The foundation of the Professional Football League in Trinidad and Tobago football occurred in 1994 after a series of events involving the Trinidad and Tobago Football Association, which provided momentum for the establishment of a professional football league. The first occurred with the announcement that the Football Association had signed a US$5 million contract with Umbro to sponsor the national team with equipment and apparel until 1998. In the case that the Soca Warriors qualified for the 1998 FIFA World Cup, the international sportswear manufacturers would further donate US$50,000 to the newly formed Football Company of Trinidad and Tobago (SporTT). The organisation, which included some of the twin-island Republic's top businessmen, held the responsibility for administration and funding of the Football Association. The second major announcement involved local beer manufacturers Carib injecting US$200,000 in prize money for the National League. The eventual league champions, Police, received US$100,000 – the largest amount ever awarded during the league's history. Consequently, the 1994 season was the start of a professional trend in the country where large amounts of money were introduced on the domestic football scene.

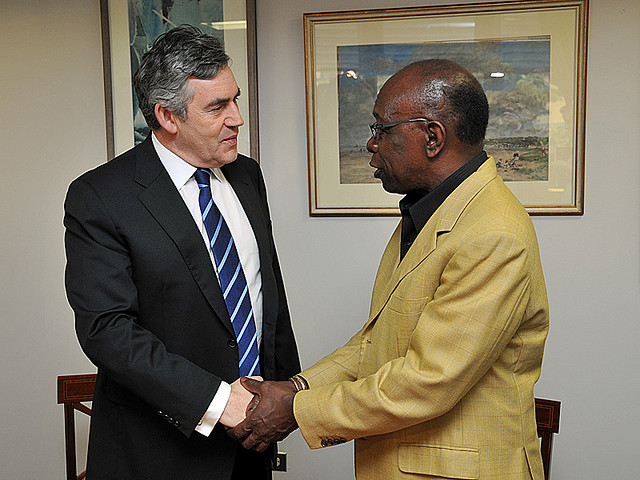
Jack Warner's (right) proposal in November 1995 laid the foundation for professional football in Trinidad and Tobago

In November 1995, Jack Warner proposed that creating a professional league to produce homegrown players would function as the building blocks to qualify for the 1998 FIFA World Cup in France. In fact, speaking on the importance of a professional league for the future, Warner stated "professionalism or death for Trinidad and Tobago football." His proposal, which included clubs the ability to operate as business entities, laid the foundation for professional football in Trinidad and Tobago.

=== Semi-Professional League (1996–1998) ===
In order to successfully develop a professional football league in the country, the Football Association established the Semi-Professional League in 1996 to provide teams and players with a semi-professional environment, as they transitioned during a three-year period for life in a professional league. In particular, clubs were issued three important criteria that would be used for professional league admission:

- The incoming club must show proof of a home venue to stage matches,
- The incoming club must provide a minimum wage of TT$2,000 per month to a contracted player,
- The incoming club must have a minimum of sixteen (16) contracted players, a manager, and a physiotherapist.

During its first two years, Carib remained as sponsors of the Semi-Professional League with US$200,000 each year in prize money. Defence Force continued a theme set during the National League en route to consecutive league championships. However, in its final season the league saw the rise of a new club owned by Jack Warner, when Joe Public won its first league title. After the final season of the Semi-Professional League, several clubs were denied admission into the professional league after failing to meet the aforementioned criteria. Clubs were also faced with supplying the professional league a bank draft guaranteeing TT$400,000 to meet the requirements for admission.

Although the Semi-Professional League was established in Trinidad and Tobago as a foundation to professional football, public response was consistent with what had become the norm during the amateur years of the sport. In particular, attendance was about 50 at each match with highest figures peaking just over 100. Prior to its final season, the Football Association and Jack Warner employed the services of local sports marketing agents with the objective to increase match attendances. After an aggressive, short-term marketing campaign was developed and launched, the league witnessed general attendance rise to 200 with highest single match figures growing to approximately 1000.

In addition, it was also during this time that Trinidad and Tobago witnessed the establishment of the first football academy and development suite in the Caribbean in 1996. The Dr. João Havelange Centre of Excellence, named after former FIFA president João Havelange, was constructed on the outskirts of Port of Spain and included a sanctuary, swimming complex, hotel, conference center, three practice fields, and a 6,000-seat football stadium. The football centre was the idea of Jack Warner and was funded through a FIFA development grant in excess of US$16 million. Although the development was financed by FIFA, the football centre was registered in the name of two companies owned by Warner, which remains a controversial issue. Moreover, the football stadium located on the complex, Marvin Lee Stadium, serves as the home to Warner-owned club Joe Public.

== Development ==
=== Early years (1999–2001) ===
The Trinidad and Tobago all-professional league, called the Professional Football League, was founded on 5 January 1999 with its inaugural season held in the same year to become the first professional football league in the Caribbean. The eight inaugural members were Defence Force, Doc's Khelwalaas, FUTGOF, Joe Public, Point Fortin Civic, Police, San Juan Jabloteh, and W Connection. The clubs were inserted into a single table competing against each other club on four occasions for a total of 28 matches. In the first professional season, Defence Force continued their dominance from the National League and Semi-Professional League, which saw the club win a record twentieth league championship. Although Joe Public finished the season as runners-up, the team witnessed a break-out season from one of the Pro League's first stars and prolific goal scorers with Arnold Dwarika scoring 45 goals for the Eastern Lions. However, the first season would end on a low point after Point Fortin were expelled from the league for showing up to a match with just six players. Prior to the following season, FUTGOF were also excluded since the club could not continue to maintain the financial standards set by the league.

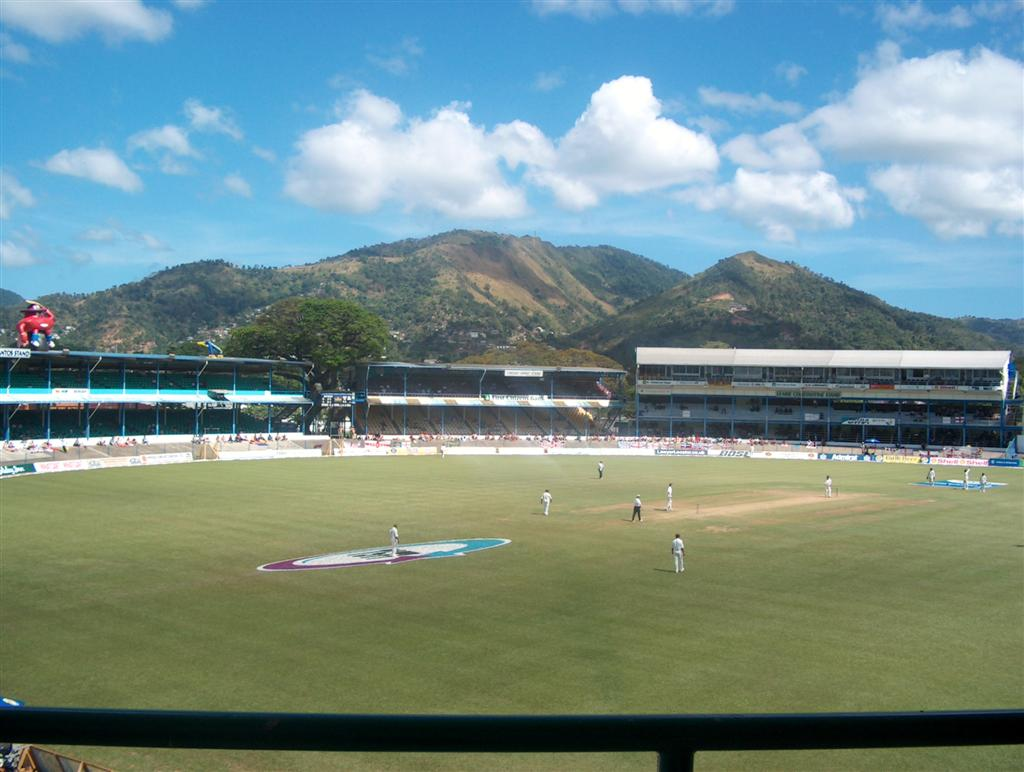
Queen's Park Oval was used to host several domestic matches for Defence Force and San Juan Jabloteh during the league's inaugural season

The league's next two years witnessed W Connection, a relatively new club based in Point Lisas, begin its ascent as a dominant professional club within Trinidad and Tobago. After finishing third in the league and capturing the FA Trophy in the club's inaugural season in 1999, the Savonetta Boys would see even more success after becoming the first Pro League club to complete the league and cup double in 2000. Moreover, W Connection captured three additional trophies the following season by winning the league cup, the inaugural Pro Bowl, and repeating as league champions in a shortened season due to the country staging the FIFA U-17 World Championship in September 2001.

In the Pro League's early years, several clubs played their home matches on fields within their respective communities. In particular, Queen's Park Oval, constructed in 1896 and considered to be one of the most picturesque cricket venues in the West Indies, served as the home for Defence Force and San Juan Jabloteh, whereas W Connection and Police hosted league matches, respectively, at nearby Gilbert Park in Couva and San Fernando's Skinner Park. It was expected that supporters would identify with their respective community club and its players. However, the inaugural season of the Professional Football League experienced a drop in attendance with the trend continuing for the following two seasons.

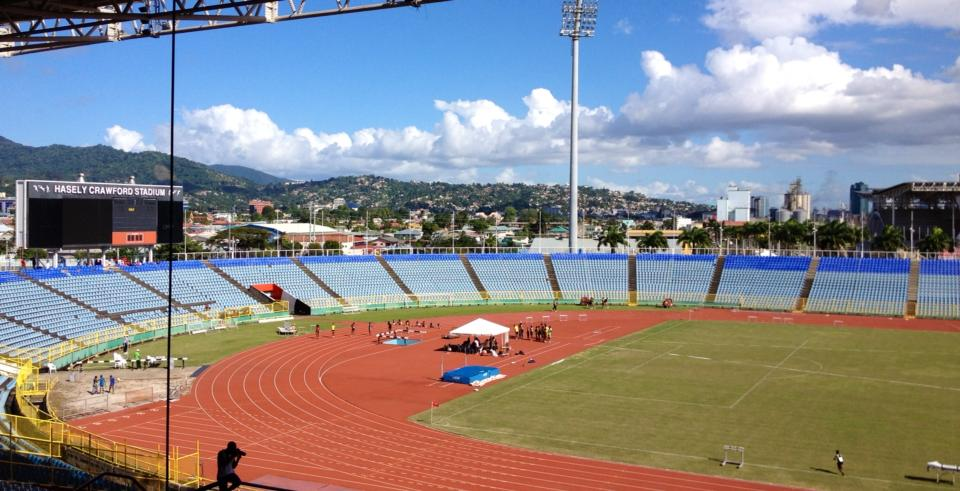
After construction of four new stadiums and renovations to the National Stadium in 2001, the Pro League began playing matches in government-owned stadiums

However, after Trinidad and Tobago was awarded the 2001 FIFA U-17 World Championship, four football stadiums were constructed in various locations across the twin-island Republic in honour of Trinidad and Tobago's all-time leading sportsmen: Ato Boldon (Couva), Dwight Yorke (Bacolet), Larry Gomes (Malabar), and Manny Ramjohn (Marabella). In addition, the National Stadium, renamed in honour of Hasely Crawford, underwent major renovation for the competition and expanded capacity to 27,000 to become the country's largest stadium. Consequently, the Pro League decided to relocate its matches from community fields to larger, government-owned football stadiums located outside each club's respective community support.

=== Formation of a new league (2002–2004) ===
In February 2002, the Professional Football League ceased operations after failing to prove its self-sustainability during the first three seasons and a decision from its owner and founder, Jack Warner, to withdraw funding for the league. Early results of the Professional Football League suggested an improvement in player development with several domestic professionals named to starting roles in the national team. In addition, clubs also benefited as their players secured transfers to prominent leagues in Europe, including Defence Force winger Carlos Edwards to Wrexham of the Football League for £250,000 in 2000. As a result, club owners agreed a month later to develop a new professional league that would operate rather as a corporation, known as the T&T Pro League Limited, owned by the member clubs. Thus, the TT Pro League was formed as a limited company and continuation of the Professional Football League.

The TT Pro League kicked off in April 2002 with eight members: Arima Fire, Caledonia AIA, Defence Force, Joe Public, North East Stars, San Juan Jabloteh, South Starworld Strikers, and W Connection. The league underwent a significant transition during its first few years after becoming a corporation. In fact, Pro League clubs decided to play the league's inaugural season without a guarantee of prize money to ensure that the Pro League's survival took paramount importance. However, through the formation of a board of directors, consisting of a representative from each club, the league obtained TT$2 million from the Trinidad and Tobago government for its first season and additional depreciated payments by 25% each year for the next three years. The government also agreed to continue its support for the Pro League until it becomes self-sustainable and viable. Upon the conclusion of the 2002 season, Larry Romany, former vice-president of the Trinidad and Tobago Olympic Committee, was elected by the board of directors as the Pro League's first chairman to oversee league operations.

The first two Pro League seasons featured the English-led success of San Juan Jabloteh, behind managers Terry Fenwick and Ricky Hill, which lost only four games in winning consecutive league titles. The following season, the league instituted the Pro League Big Six, which pitted the top six teams in a post-season, single round-robin played at neutral stadiums. San Juan Jabloteh became the first to win the Big Six, however, North East Stars claimed the league title ending the San Juan Kings' stranglehold on the league championship. There were also several changes to the participating clubs in the first few years. In 2003, the league expanded to ten teams with the addition of South West Institute of Football, later renamed the South West Drillers, and Tobago United — the first club established on the sister-isle of Tobago. However, at the conclusion of the 2004 season, the league contracted back to eight with Arima Fire and Caledonia AIA merging to form Morvant-Arima Fire, South West Drillers were renamed United Petrotrin, and Joe Public voluntarily withdrew from the Pro League citing financial difficulties.

=== Small rise in popularity (2005–2008) ===
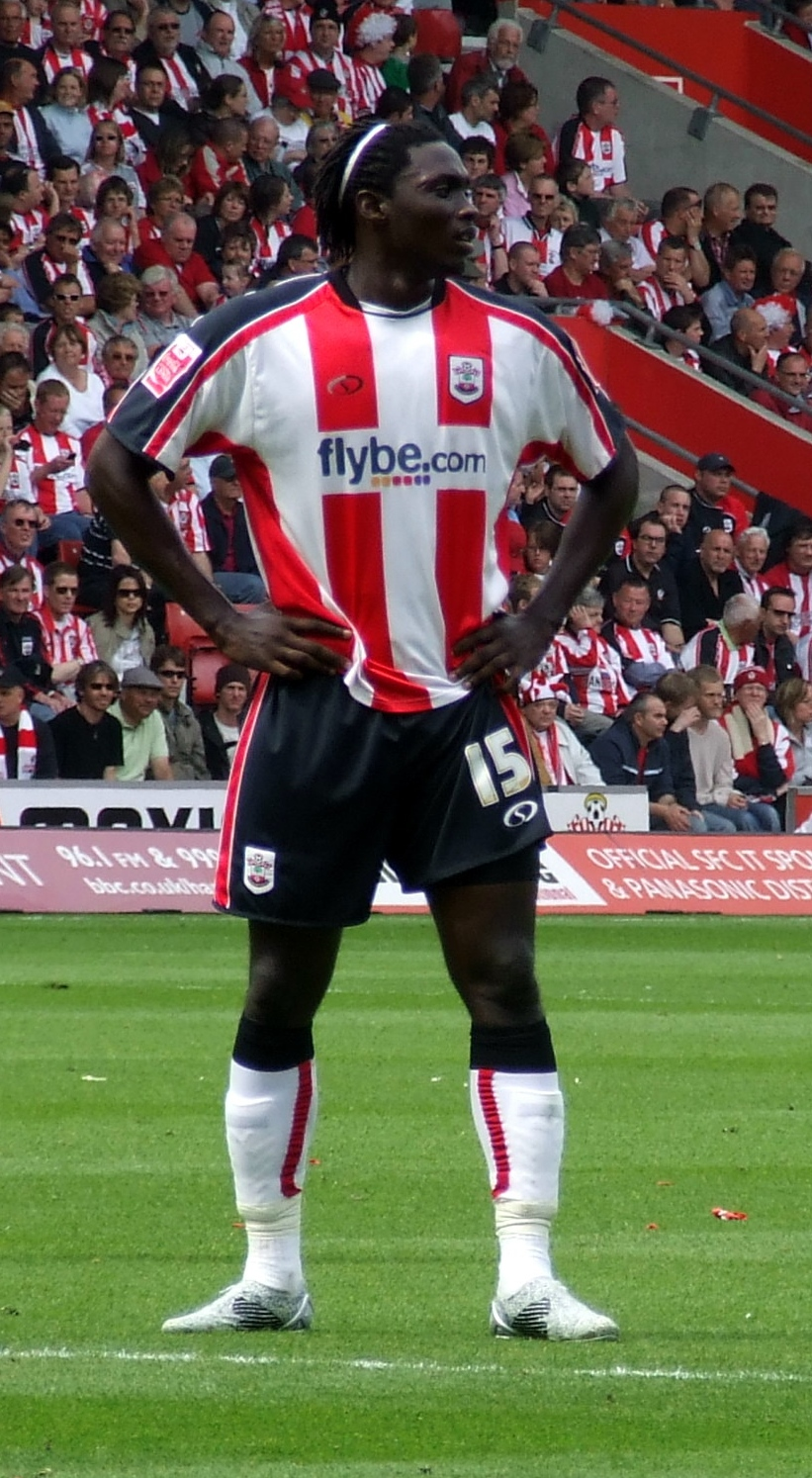
Kenwyne Jones, former star for Joe Public and W Connection, transferred to Southampton in 2004

After establishing itself on the talents of homegrown players, the league continued to see several of its stars move to leagues in Europe and North America. Collin Samuel, winger for San Juan Jabloteh, signed for Falkirk of the Scottish Premier League in August 2002, and a year later was joined at Dundee United by national teammate and Defence Force striker Jason Scotland. In addition, Kenwyne Jones, former star for Joe Public and W Connection, signed with Southampton of the English Premier League for a nominal fee and Cornell Glen of San Juan Jabloteh joined the MetroStars based in the United States' Major League Soccer during the 2004 season. The departures ultimately benefited the league as the national team, composed of several current and former Pro League players, qualified for the nation's first FIFA World Cup in November 2005.

In the build-up to the 2006 FIFA World Cup, community interest in local football was at an all-time high and the Pro League garnered praise for its development of homegrown professional footballers. As a result, the league implemented a series of marketing plans in 2006 to establish itself as a viable professional league. The first step was to increase league membership back to ten teams with the arrivals of Joe Public, South Starworld Strikers, and Superstar Rangers. The Pro League also established its reserve league in 2007 for players that were previously on the bench during league matches to have a league of their own to show scouts their skills on the field. Each member of the Pro League can have their respective reserve team participate in the under-18 league.

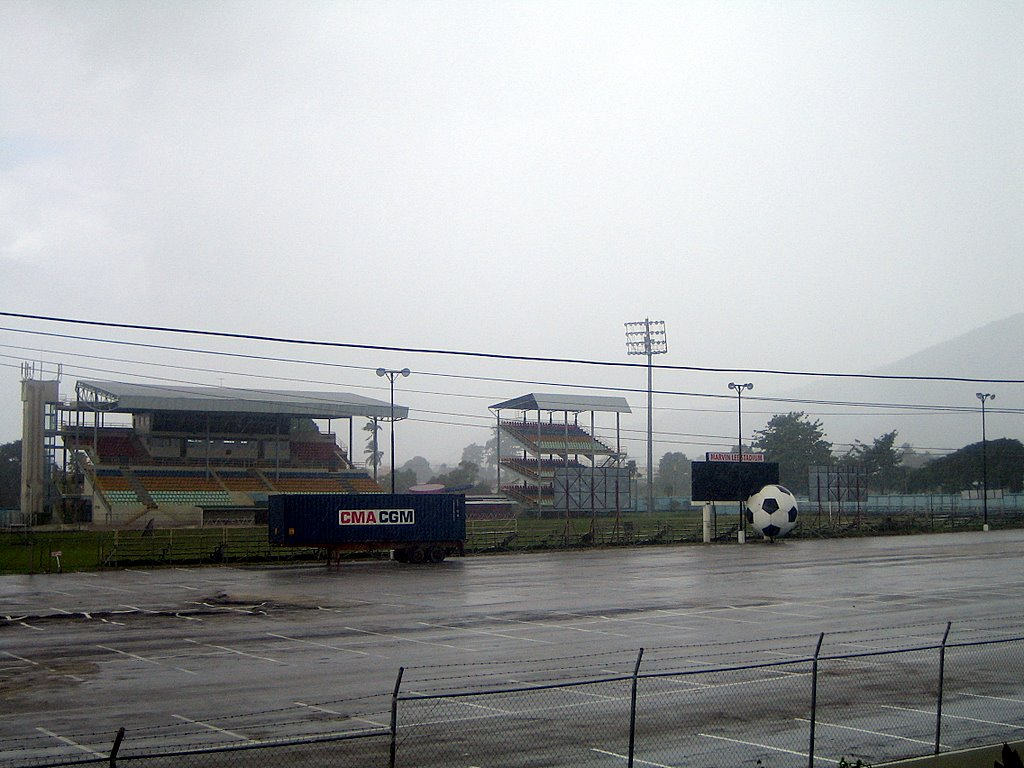
Marvin Lee Stadium, the first Caribbean stadium to install an artificial playing surface

Furthermore, in 2005, Jack Warner proposed that Marvin Lee Stadium in Tunapuna install an artificial playing surface, citing that it would bring more credibility to the region. Two years later, through a FIFA developmental grant, Joe Public became the first Caribbean club to install an artificial playing surface, reportedly costing in excess of TT$8 million. The first match played after installation was a TT Pro League encounter between Joe Public and Caledonia AIA on 1 May 2007, which ended in a hard-fought 1–0 win for Caledonia following a late goal from Marvin Oliver.

After the expansion of the previous CONCACAF Champions' Cup into the Champions League in 2008, the Caribbean gained two additional qualification positions. Joe Public, after finishing runners-up in the 2007 Caribbean Club Championship, became the first club to represent the TT Pro League in the Champions League. On 26 August 2008, the Eastern Lions stunned the New England Revolution of Major League Soccer in the preliminary round following a 2–1 win in front of a crowd of 2,100 in Marvin Lee Stadium, before defeating the American club 4–0 in the return match to advance to the group stage. With the result, Joe Public became the first Caribbean club to defeat a team from the United States in a CONCACAF club competition. In the group stage, Joe Public were drawn with Atlante, Olimpia, and Montreal Impact and struggled to obtain positive results. The Eastern Lions finished with a disappointing one win from six to finish at the bottom of their group. However, the club's lone win came in Cancún against eventual Champions League winners Atlante, marking the first time a Trinidadian club had defeated a team from the Mexican Primera División.

== Recent years ==
=== International influence (2009–2010) ===
After the league's first decade, the TT Pro League took steps to internationalise the league in an effort to raise the level of its competition. One of the first moves in this regard was to align its calendar with those of major football leagues around the world. Prior to 2010, the Pro League operated on a spring-to-fall format which caused several conflicts with the FIFA calendar. Afterwards, several players were offered greater transfer opportunities to more prominent leagues following the schedule change. The second move was to expand club rosters from 25 to 35 players to provide clubs flexibility during the prolonged calendar featuring three rounds of league competition, five domestic cup competitions, CFU Club Championship, and the CONCACAF Champions League. In addition, clubs were also provided the option to postpone their scheduled league match if the club stood without three (3) or more players on international duty. In March 2010, the Pro League announced that the Pro League Big Six competition was to be discontinued to increase attendances and importance of league matches, which would be moved to exclusively to Fridays (Super Fridays) and Saturdays (Fiesta Saturdays). Furthermore, after nearly a decade without a title sponsor, the league signed an agreement with Digicel to become the primary sponsor of the Pro League in 2009.

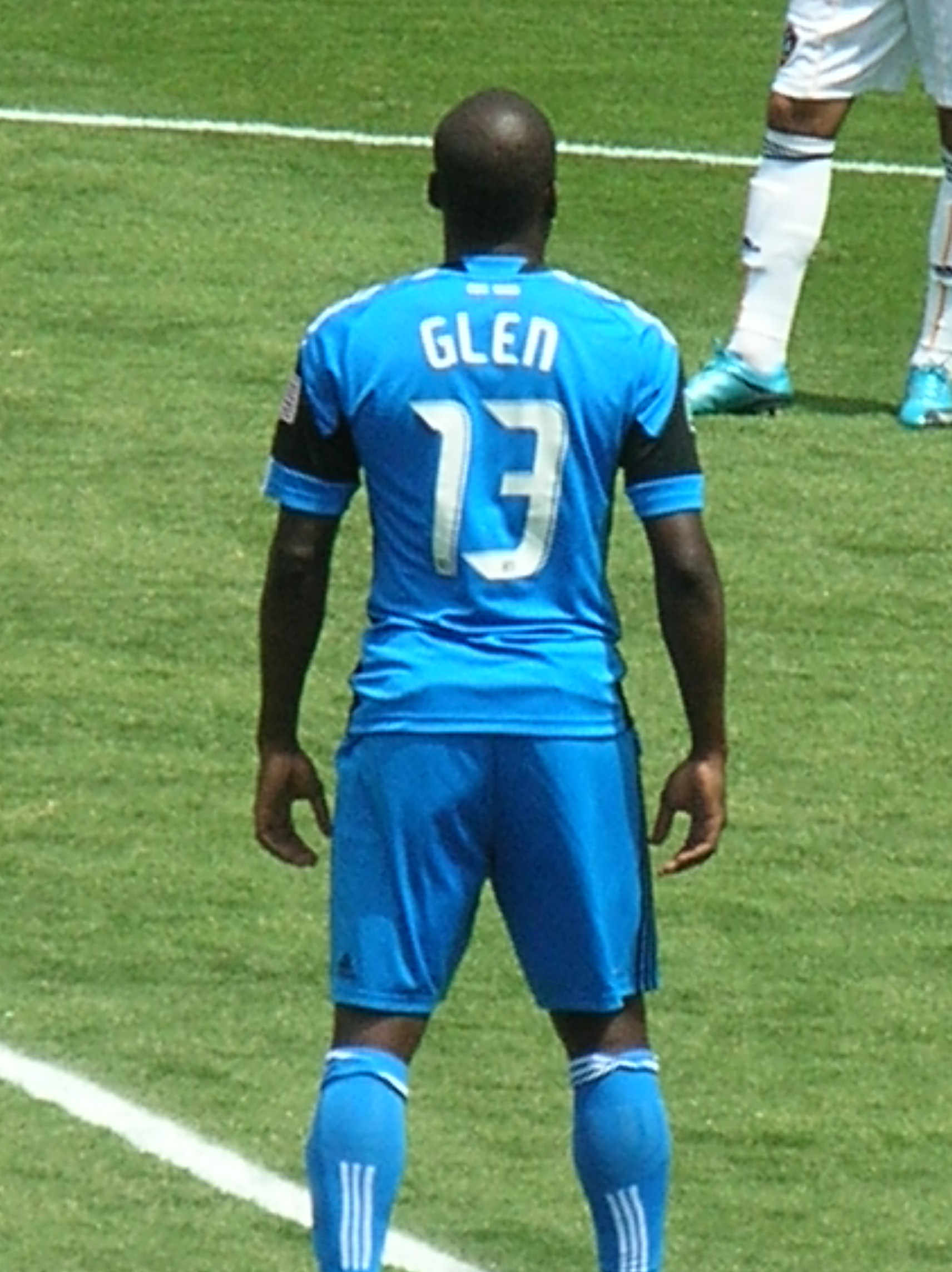
Cornell Glen secured a free transfer to the San Jose Earthquakes in 2009 from San Juan Jabloteh

The Pro League also started to market itself on the talents of its Trinidad and Tobago players, both experienced and young talents. In 2009, the league witnessed a return of several former national team stars, which included Stern John, Russell Latapy, Dennis Lawrence, and Dwight Yorke. In addition, several more Pro League players made a significant impact on the league after spending a majority of their career on the twin-island Republic. In the 2009 season, Arnold Dwarika of United Petrotrin became the first Trinidadian player to score 100 Pro League goals. However, Kerry Baptiste soon became the second domestic player to reach the century mark after the Joe Public winger scored 35 goals, including two beaver-tricks, en route to winning the Pro League Golden Boot. Moreover, breakout stars such as Keon Daniel, Cornell Glen, Kevin Molino, and Lester Peltier began making names for themselves in the Pro League before starring for the Soca Warriors and securing transfers to Asia, Europe, and North America. This exchange of top prospects for veterans to the Pro League signified an increased international awareness and potential for popularity.

In April 2010, the Pro League implemented the Helping Others is a Priority Everyday (HOPE) project to allow clubs to build lasting relationships with their communities. With the mission statement of "One people, one vision, one culture, striving for excellence", the league stated that it was paramount to use the sport as a tool to transform and positively affect the communities represented throughout the twin-island Republic. In addition, the principal objective is to utilize its players, who are loved and respected community members, as role models, to lift morale and be involved in various community projects. Football would also play an important part in the improvement of social problems facing society in the country, since the sport would engage and stimulate an interest in the Pro League — increasing awareness and visibility of players, club, and the league within each respective community. Each club is required to be involved in at least five (5) activities during each year in order to become eligible for league season prize awards.

=== Expansion and contraction (2011–2014) ===
In a step to increase its viability as a [professional football league within the Caribbean, the Pro League began plans for further expansion. After the inclusion of Ma Pau in 2008 to replace outgoing Police, the league admitted FC South End in 2009 and T&TEC in 2011 to increase league membership to its highest at eleven. However, several clubs struggled financially to maintain their football operations and remain in the Pro League more than a few years. Contraction began with the expulsion of Tobago United during the 2010–11 season for failure to settle outstanding registration fees owed to the Pro League. After the season had concluded, Joe Public, Ma Pau, and South End would soon follow the Tobago Boys and withdrew from the Pro League. However, the most alarming news came one year later when four-time league champions San Juan Jabloteh became the sixth team to withdraw after requesting a one-year hiatus to search for a long-term sponsor.

In response, Dexter Skeene, chief executive officer of the TT Pro League, expressed his intentions that "the country's best footballing interests are served by an eight team league" prior to the 2012–13 season. Therefore, a new club established by former Trinidad and Tobago international Brent Sancho to represent the Central region of the country, Central FC, was formed and admitted as an expansion team in 2012 to maintain Pro League membership at eight. Following the season, however, T&TEC became the seventh team to withdraw from the Pro League during a four-year period. In September 2013, Point Fortin Civic and San Juan Jabloteh were re-admitted to increase Pro League membership back to nine.

Although several expansion clubs struggled to maintain their Pro League existence for more than a few seasons, Central FC established itself as Central region rivals to W Connection after challenging the Savonetta Boys for the 2013–14 TT Pro League championship – finishing runners-up and five points behind. Consequently, Central became the first expansion club in the Pro League to qualify for the CFU Club Championship. The Sharks also claimed their first two pieces of silverware in their second season after winning the 2013 First Citizens Cup and 2014 Lucozade Sport Goal Shield.

After enjoying relative success for the past decade at the international club level, Pro League clubs began to experience disappointing performances in the CFU Club Championship and CONCACAF Champions League in 2011. In particular, having qualified for the CFU Club Championship as the 2010–11 TT Pro League champions and runners-up, Defence Force and Caledonia AIA, respectively, were eliminated from the sub-continental tournament following defeats to Alpha United and Tempête, which marked the first time Pro League clubs failed to qualify for the Champions League under its revised format. Although, over the next two years, Pro League clubs W Connection and Caledonia AIA qualified for the Champions League, neither club was able to record a win during the 2012–13 and 2013–14 group stages; each finishing bottom in their respective group. In 2014, Defence Force and Caledonia AIA were again unable reach the Champions League, having finished runners-up to Alpha United and Waterhouse during the Caribbean Club Championship.

=== Fight for sustainability (2015–present) ===
The TT Pro League has faced major obstacles towards building a sustainable league during its first fifteen seasons. Among the main issues that have ailed several Pro League clubs, apart from insufficient sponsorship, is the lack of community football grounds. Following the league's decision, in 2001, to relocate its matches to the five larger, government-owned stadiums, clubs voiced their displeasure in staging home matches outside their respective communities and stated that having home grounds would be key to their financial viability. Consequently, clubs with the exception of Defence Force, have relied heavily on support from the Ministry of Sport and Youth Affairs to offset its expenses through TT$83,000 monthly subventions. However, in September 2015, one of the biggest fears that the Pro League faced in its short history was realized following a decision by the Ministry to reduce its monthly funding for each club to TT$50,000. In response to national and community concerns, Dexter Skeene stated in a March 2016 interview:

Fear not the league is here to stay. Too much has been invested in the TT Pro League over the past twelve years to give up now[...] We remain focused and understand the importance of the league to football, the youth, and communities of Trinidad and Tobago. I remain convinced, once the league is able to get the grounds in the communities, I can guarantee the Minister, Ministry, and the national community that no government funding will have to be given to any Pro League club after three years.

— Dexter Skeene, speaking on the importance of returning to community grounds.

Due to growing concerns that the Pro League clubs must become self-sustainable, several decided to move its home matches back into their respective communities. In particular, San Juan Jabloteh played its first home match, on 5 March 2016, in the San Juan community for the first time in 17 years when the San Juan Kings competed against Point Fortin Civic at the Barataria Recreation Ground.

== See also ==
- List of TT Pro League seasons
