= 2010–11 TT Pro League =

TT Pro League
- Season: 2010–11
- Champions: Defence Force; 2nd Pro League title 21st T&T title
- CFU Club Championship: Defence Force; Caledonia AIA
- Matches: 90
- Goals: 255 (2.83 per match)
- Top goalscorer: Devorn Jorsling (15 goals)
- Biggest home win: Caledonia AIA 5–0 Police (14 December 2010)
- Biggest away win: FC South End 0–6 W Connection (15 January 2011)
- Highest scoring: North East Stars 6–3 Police (7 December 2010)

The 2010–11 TT Pro League season (known as the Digicel Pro League for sponsorship reasons) was the twelfth season of the TT Pro League, the Trinidad and Tobago professional league for association football clubs, since its establishment in 1999. A total of eleven teams contested the league, with Joe Public the defending champions. The season began on 23 April 2010 and ended on 1 February 2011 with the crowning of the league champion. The league calendar was changed for the second consecutive season. Pro League CEO, Dexter Skeene, announced on 25 March 2010 that the Pro League Big Six competition was to be discontinued to increase attendances and importance of league matches, which would be moved exclusively to Fridays and Saturdays.

United Petrotrin withdrew stating financial difficulties as the reason to pull out of the Pro League. A dedication to the club's youth development in the community was also cited by club chairman and communications manager of Petrotrin, Arnold Corneal, on 12 January 2010. However, on 18 February, North East Stars were re-admitted into the Pro League following a one- year absence due to the state of their home ground, Sangre Grande Recreational Ground.

The first goal of the season was scored by W Connection's Matthew Bartholomew against San Juan Jabloteh in the sixty-third minute of the first game on 23 April 2010. Odelle Armstrong of St. Ann's Rangers scored the first hat-trick of the season against Police on 29 May. Devorn Jorsling became the first player to win the Golden Boot twice having scored 15 goals for Defence Force on their way to becoming league champions. Jorsling previously won the award in 2008.

The season was delayed for a month for rescheduling after Tobago United were expelled from the league on 16 September 2010, leaving ten teams. Furthermore, after the season had been concluded, Ma Pau requested a one-year sabbatical from the Pro League from the 2011–12 season. On 10 August 2011, Skeene further announced that both Joe Public and FC South End would not be participating in the following season. After having won its first ten matches of the season, Defence Force clinched their second season title on 18 January 2011. By finishing as the league champion, Defence Force qualified for the 2011 CFU Club Championship. Caledonia AIA also qualified for the regional competition by finishing runners-up in the league.

== Changes from the 2009 season ==
The following changes were made since the 2009 season:

- Dexter Skeene, Pro League CEO, announced that league matches would only be played on Fridays and Saturdays, with the season ending on 1 February.
  - The Pro League Big Six competition was discontinued to increase the importance of league matches.
- There were a number of changes to the clubs competing in the 2010–11 season.
  - United Petrotrin withdrew from the league following the 2009 season.
  - North East Stars were re-admitted after a one-year absence from the league.
    - A two-year title sponsorship agreement was announced between North East Stars and DirecTV.
    - Italian sportswear company, Lotto announced a uniform supplier agreement with North East Stars.
  - T&TEC, the 2009 National Super League runners-up, requested that its application for admission into the Pro League be deferred until the 2011–12 season.

== Teams ==
=== Team summaries ===
Location of the 2010–11 TT Pro League teams

Note: Flags indicate national team as has been defined under FIFA eligibility rules. Players may hold more than one non-FIFA nationality.

Team	Location	Stadium	Capacity	Manager	Captain
Caledonia AIA	Morvant/Laventille	Larry Gomes Stadium	10,000	(Trinidad and Tobago) Jamaal Shabazz	(Trinidad and Tobago) Stephan David
Defence Force	Chaguaramas	Hasely Crawford Stadium	27,000	(Trinidad and Tobago) Ross Russell	(Trinidad and Tobago) Corey Rivers
FC South End	Point Fortin	Manny Ramjohn Stadium	10,000	(Trinidad and Tobago) Dick Furlonge	(Trinidad and Tobago) Aubrey David
Joe Public	Arouca	Marvin Lee Stadium	6,000	(Trinidad and Tobago) Derek King	(Trinidad and Tobago) Trent Noel
Ma Pau	Woodbrook	Hasely Crawford Stadium	27,000	(Trinidad and Tobago) Michael McComie	(Trinidad and Tobago) Lyndon Andrews
North East Stars	Sangre Grande	Sangre Grande Ground	7,000	(Trinidad and Tobago) Shurland David	(Guyana) Charles Pollard
Police	Saint James	Hasely Crawford Stadium	27,000	(Trinidad and Tobago) Kelvin Jones	(Trinidad and Tobago) Noel Williams
San Juan Jabloteh	San Juan	Hasely Crawford Stadium	27,000	(England) Terry Fenwick	(Trinidad and Tobago) Marvin Oliver
St. Ann's Rangers	San Juan	Hasely Crawford Stadium	27,000	(Trinidad and Tobago) Anthony Streete	(Trinidad and Tobago) Akil Clarke
Tobago United	Bacolet	Dwight Yorke Stadium	7,500	(Trinidad and Tobago) Peter Granville	(Guyana) Kayode McKinnon
W Connection	Point Lisas	Manny Ramjohn Stadium	10,000	(Saint Lucia) Stuart Charles-Fevrier	(Saint Lucia) Elijah Joseph

=== Managerial changes ===
Team	Outgoing manager	Manner of departure	Date of vacancy	Table	Incoming manager	Date of appointment	Table
North East Stars	Re-admitted team				(United States) Rod Underwood	16 April 2010	Pre-season
FC South End	(Trinidad and Tobago) Leroy DeLeon	Sacked	17 November 2009	8th (2009)	(Trinidad and Tobago) Dick Furlonge	24 April 2010	Pre-season
Police	(Trinidad and Tobago) Richard De Coteau	Sacked	20 November 2009	11th (2009)	(Trinidad and Tobago) Anthony Marshall	24 April 2010	Pre-season
North East Stars	(United States) Rod Underwood	Mutual consent	25 June 2010	6th	(Trinidad and Tobago) Shurland David	1 July 2010	6th
Police	(Trinidad and Tobago) Anthony Marshall	Sacked	20 November 2010	10th	(Trinidad and Tobago) Kelvin Jones	20 November 2010	10th
Joe Public	(Trinidad and Tobago) Derek King	Mutual consent	2 February 2011	3rd	(Trinidad and Tobago) Rajesh Latchoo	2 February 2011	Postseason
San Juan Jabloteh	(England) Terry Fenwick	Sacked	29 March 2011	6th	(Trinidad and Tobago) Earl Carter	1 July 2011	Postseason

== League table ==
Pos	Team	Pld	W	D	L	GF	GA	GD	Pts	Qualification
1	Defence Force (C)	18	13	2	3	38	13	+25	41	2011 CFU Club Championship First round
2	Caledonia AIA	18	11	3	4	30	18	+12	36	2011 CFU Club Championship First round
3	Joe Public	18	10	5	3	30	22	+8	35	Team disbanded after season (Note: Following the season, Joe Public, Ma Pau, and FC South End withdrew from the Pro League for the 2011–12 season.)
4	W Connection	18	9	4	5	35	13	+22	31	
5	Ma Pau	18	8	5	5	24	16	+8	29	Team disbanded after season
6	San Juan Jabloteh	18	7	6	5	25	14	+11	27	
7	North East Stars	18	7	6	5	29	24	+5	27	
8	St. Ann's Rangers	18	2	4	12	14	36	−22	10	
9	Police	18	2	3	13	20	54	−34	9	
10	FC South End	18	2	0	16	10	45	−35	6	Team disbanded after season
11	Tobago United	0	0	0	0	0	0	0	0 (Note: Tobago United was expelled from the league on 16 September 2010. On the same day their record (PL10 W2 D1 L7 GF10 GA24 Pts7) was expunged.)	Resigned/expelled from league, record expunged

Updated to match(es) played on 1 February 2011. Source: TT Pro League
Rules for classification: 1) points; 2) goal difference; 3) number of goals scored.
(C) Champions

=== Positions by round ===
Leader
2011 CFU Club Championship First round
Team disbanded after season
Team expelled from league

The table lists the positions of teams after each week of matches. In order to preserve chronological evolvements, any postponed matches are not included to the round at which they were originally scheduled, but added to the full round they were played immediately afterwards. For example, if a match is scheduled for the tenth round of matches, but then postponed and played between rounds 16 and 17, it will be added to the standings for round 16.

Team ╲ Round	1	2	3	4	5	6	7	8	9	10	11	12	13	14	15	16	17	18	19	20
Defence Force	1	1	1	1	1	1	1	1	1	1	1	1	1	1	1	1	1	1	1	1
Caledonia AIA	3	3	6	7	9	9	9	7	7	6	6	4	3	3	3	2	2	3	3	2
Joe Public	5	6	3	3	4	6	4	5	4	4	2	2	2	2	2	4	4	2	2	3
W Connection	4	4	2	2	3	5	3	3	2	2	3	3	5	5	5	3	3	4	5	4
Ma Pau	6	7	5	5	2	2	2	2	3	3	4	5	4	4	4	5	7	6	4	5
San Juan Jabloteh	7	8	9	6	5	4	6	4	5	5	5	6	7	7	6	6	5	5	6	6
North East Stars	2	2	4	4	6	3	5	6	6	7	7	7	6	6	7	7	6	7	7	7
St. Ann's Rangers	8	9	8	9	8	7	7	8	8	8	8	8	8	8	8	8	8	8	8	8
Police	9	10	10	10	10	10	10	10	10	10	10	9	9	9	9	9	9	9	10	9
FC South End	10	5	7	8	7	8	8	9	9	9	9	10	10	10	10	10	10	10	9	10
Tobago United	11	11	11	11	11	11	11	11	11	11	11	11	11	11	11	11	11	11	11	11

Updated to match(es) played on 1 February 2011. Source: TT Pro League

== Results ==
Home \ Away	CAL	DEF	SOE	JOE	MAP	NES	POL	SJJ	RAN	TBU	WCO
Caledonia AIA		0–3	1–2	1–1	2–1	0–0	5–0	3–2	4–2		2–1
Defence Force	2–0		1–0	1–2	2–1	4–3	3–0	2–0	3–0		2–1
FC South End	1–2	0–4		0–2	0–3	0–3	0–3	1–4	1–0		0–6
Joe Public	0–2	1–3	2–1		2–1	3–2	2–1	3–1	2–1		1–1
Ma Pau	2–0	1–0	2–0	1–1		0–0	3–1	0–1	1–0		2–2
North East Stars	1–2	2–1	2–1	1–1	1–3		6–3	1–1	2–0		2–1
Police	0–1	0–3	3–1	1–3	2–2	2–2		1–4	2–5		0–5
San Juan Jabloteh	0–0	0–0	4–1	1–1	0–1	2–0	4–0		2–0		0–1
St. Ann's Rangers	0–4	2–4	2–1	0–3	0–0	0–0	1–1	0–0			0–2
Tobago United											
W Connection	0–1	0–0	2–1	3–0	2–0	0–1	4–0	0–0	4–1		

Updated to match(es) played on 1 February 2011. Source: TT Pro League
Legend: Blue = home team win; Yellow = draw; Red = away team win.

== Season statistics ==
=== Scoring ===
- First goal of the season: Matthew Bartholomew for W Connection against San Juan Jabloteh, (23 April 2010).
- Last goal of the season: Sayid Freitas for Police against FC South End, (1 February 2011).
- First own goal of the season: Aubrey David (FC South End) for North East Stars, (20 November 2010).
- First penalty kick of the season: Matthew Bartholomew (scored) for W Connection against Joe Public (29 May 2010).
- First hat-trick of the season: Odelle Armstrong (St. Ann's Rangers) against Police, 53', 65', 89' (29 May 2010).
- Most goals scored by one player in a match: 3 goals
  - Odelle Armstrong (St. Ann's Rangers) against Police, 53', 65', 89' (29 May 2010).
  - Anthony Wolfe (North East Stars) against Police, 53', 66', 86' (7 December 2010).
  - Kerry Baptiste (Joe Public) against San Juan Jabloteh, 51', 66', 87', (7 December 2010).
- Widest winning margin: 6 goals
  - FC South End 0–6 W Connection (15 January 2011)
- Most goals in a match: 9 goals
  - North East Stars 6–3 Police (7 December 2010)
- Most goals in one half: 7 goals
  - Police v St. Ann's Rangers (29 May 2010) 0–0 at half-time, 2–5 final.
- Most goals in one half by a single team: 6 goals
  - North East Stars v Police (7 December 2010) 0–3 at half-time, 6–3 final.

==== Top scorers ====
Rank	Player	Club	Goals
1	(Trinidad and Tobago) Devorn Jorsling	Defence Force	15
2	(Trinidad and Tobago) Anthony Wolfe	Ma Pau / North East Stars	12
3	(Trinidad and Tobago) Andrei Pacheco	W Connection	8
4	(Trinidad and Tobago) Kerry Baptiste	Joe Public	7
5	(Trinidad and Tobago) Hughton Hector	W Connection	6
5	(Trinidad and Tobago) Errol McFarlane	North East Stars	6
5	(Trinidad and Tobago) Trent Noel	Joe Public	6
5	(Trinidad and Tobago) Richard Roy	Defence Force	6
5	(Trinidad and Tobago) Noel Williams	San Juan Jabloteh / Police	6

==== Hat-tricks ====
Player	For	Against	Result	Date	Ref(s)
(Trinidad and Tobago) Odelle Armstrong	St. Ann's Rangers	Police*	5–2	29 May 2010	
(Trinidad and Tobago) Anthony Wolfe	North East Stars*	Police	6–3	7 December 2010	
(Trinidad and Tobago) Kerry Baptiste	Joe Public*	San Juan Jabloteh	3–1	7 December 2010	

- * Home team score first in result

=== Discipline ===
- First yellow card of the season: Jason Marcano for San Juan Jabloteh against W Connection, (23 April 2010).
- First red card of the season: Nicholas Valentine for St. Ann's Rangers against Ma Pau, (30 April 2010).
- Most yellow cards in a single match: 8
  - Joe Public 1–3 Defence Force – 3 for Joe Public (Makan Hislop & Andre Toussaint) and 5 for Defence Force (Devorn Jorsling, Kerry Joseph, Michael Edwards & Sean Narcis) (5 June 2010)
- Most red cards in a single match: 2
  - Ma Pau 0–0 St. Ann's Rangers – 1 for Ma Pau (Keyeno Thomas) and 1 for St. Ann's Rangers (Nicholas Valentine)
  - Caledonia AIA 1–2 FC South End – 1 for Caledonia AIA (Nuru Abdallah Muhammad) and 1 for FC South End (Jammeal Huyghue)
  - Joe Public 1–3 Defence Force – 1 for Joe Public (Andre Toussaint) and 1 for Defence Force (Sean Narcis)

== Awards ==
=== Annual awards ===
The 2010–11 TT Pro League awards distribution took place on 8 April 2013, over two years after the conclusion of the league season, at Capital Plaza in Port of Spain, Trinidad.

After claiming the Pro League title for the second time and first since 1999, Defence Force was recognised as the Team of the Year. Devorn Jorsling was awarded the league's Player of the Year for the first time in his career. Jorsling also received the Golden Boot and Forward of the Year awards after leading the league with 15 goals in support of the Teteron Boys. Ross Russell was named the Manager of the Year after leading Defence Force to the league title in his second season. In addition, shot-stopper Cleon John of San Juan Jabloteh was named the league's Best Goalkeeper, Corneal Thomas of Ma Pau as the Defender of the Year, and Trent Noel was again named the Midfielder of the Year playing for Joe Public. The remaining team award was won by St. Ann's Rangers for the Most Disciplined Team of the Year. FIFA international referee, Neal Brizan, won the Referee of the Year for the fourth consecutive year, whereas Norris Ferguson won the Match Commissioner of the Year for the first time since 2007.

Award	Winner
Player of the Year	(Trinidad and Tobago) Devorn Jorsling (Defence Force)
Manager of the Year	(Trinidad and Tobago) Ross Russell (Defence Force)
Best Goalkeeper	(Trinidad and Tobago) Cleon John (San Juan Jabloteh)
Best Defender	(Trinidad and Tobago) Corneal Thomas (Ma Pau)
Best Midfielder	(Trinidad and Tobago) Trent Noel (Joe Public)
Best Forward	(Trinidad and Tobago) Devorn Jorsling (Defence Force)
Golden Boot	(Trinidad and Tobago) Devorn Jorsling (Defence Force)
Team of the Year	Defence Force
Most Disciplined Team of the Year	St. Ann's Rangers
Referee of the Year	Neal Brizan
Assistant Referee of the Year	Dion Neil
Match Commissioner of the Year	Norris Ferguson
