= 2009 TT Pro League =

TT Pro League
- Season: 2009
- Champions: Joe Public; 2nd Pro League title 3rd T&T title
- CFU Club Championship: San Juan Jabloteh; Joe Public
- Matches: 125
- Goals: 372 (2.98 per match)
- Top goalscorer: Kerry Baptiste (35 goals)
- Biggest home win: W Connection 8–0 Police (4 September 2009)
- Biggest away win: Police 0–7 Joe Public (29 August 2009)
- Highest scoring: Caledonia AIA 7–2 Police (18 August 2009); Jabloteh 5–4 Defence Force (15 October 2009)

The 2009 TT Pro League season (known as the Digicel Pro League for sponsorship reasons) was the eleventh season of the TT Pro League, the Trinidad and Tobago professional league for association football clubs, since its establishment in 1999. A total of eleven teams contested the league, with San Juan Jabloteh the defending champions. The season began on 8 May, with Super Friday, and ended on 27 October. The format of the season was changed from each club playing three rounds to two rounds in the regular season to facilitate the national team with its attempt to qualify for the 2010 FIFA World Cup.

Police were re-admitted into the league following a one-year absence, whereas FC South End were admitted as a new club. However, North East Stars withdrew siting the state of their home ground, Sangre Grande Recreational Ground, for the past few years as the cause to sit out the season. The Sangre Grande Boys stated that they intend to return to the league for 2010. Furthermore, Caledonia AIA changed the name of the club to Caledonia AIA of Morvant/Laventille.

The first goal of the season was scored by Caledonia AIA's Walter Moore against Joe Public in the second minute of the first game on 8 May. Kendall Velox of Caledonia AIA scored the first hat-trick of the season against Police on 23 May. Kerry Baptiste won the Golden Boot by providing 35 goals for Joe Public on their way to becoming league champions.

On 12 September, Joe Public used a 2–1 win over W Connection at Manny Ramjohn Stadium to clinch the regular season crown on 41 points. San Juan Jabloteh, Caledonia AIA, W Connection, Ma Pau, and Defence Force all qualified for the Big Six. On 24 October, Joe Public claimed the league title with a 1–1 draw against Caledonia AIA. The achievement marked their second Pro League title with the first coming in the 2006 season. Having finished as the league champion, Joe Public qualified for the 2010 CFU Club Championship. By finishing runners-up in the league, San Juan Jabloteh also qualified for the CFU Club Championship.

With an 8–0 loss to W Connection on 1 September, Police finished bottom in the league. The club had a disappointing campaign having only recorded nine points with a -48 goal difference. This marked the first season in which Tobago United did not finish the league season bottom of the table. Furthermore, on 8 January 2010, United Petrotrin announced that they had pulled the club from the Pro League.

== Changes from the 2008 season ==
The following changes were made since the 2008 season:

- The TT Pro League signed a sponsorship deal with Digicel and is now known as the Digicel Pro League.
- The number of rounds in the regular season were reduced from three to two to compensate the national team's attempt to qualify for the 2010 FIFA World Cup.
- Club rosters were expanded from 25 to 35 players to provide clubs relief during the league season that involved 2010 FIFA World Cup qualification, CONCACAF Champions League, and other domestic fixtures.
- There were a number of changes to the clubs competing in the 2009 season.
  - FC South End, a new club based in Point Fortin were admitted into the league.
  - North East Stars withdrew from the league and will return in 2010.
  - Police were re-admitted after sitting out the 2008 season.
  - Caledonia AIA changed the name of the club to Caledonia AIA of Morvant/Laventille.
  - The Trinidad and Tobago U20 national team were admitted to the Pro League to prepare for the 2009 FIFA U-20 World Cup in Egypt, but eventually did not enter.
  - Applications for admission by Marabella Flames, 1976 Phoenix, and St. Clair's Coaching School to join the Pro League were rejected.
- The Pro Bowl was shifted to close off the 2009 calendar in November and December with new branding partner Digicel following a pullout by former sponsors Courts Trinidad and Tobago Limited.
- A new knockout tournament named the Lucozade Sport Goal Shield took place in May and June with a unique prize money system. As a result, Lucozade Sport will no longer sponsor the Big Six.

== Teams ==
=== Team summaries ===
Location of the 2009 TT Pro League teams

Note: Flags indicate national team as has been defined under FIFA eligibility rules. Players may hold more than one non-FIFA nationality.

| Team | Location | Stadium | Capacity | Manager | Captain |
|---|---|---|---|---|---|
| Caledonia AIA | Morvant/Laventille | Larry Gomes Stadium | 10,000 | (Trinidad and Tobago) Jamaal Shabazz | (Guyana) Charles Pollard |
| Defence Force | Chaguaramas | Hasely Crawford Stadium | 27,000 | (Trinidad and Tobago) Ross Russell | (Trinidad and Tobago) Corey Rivers |
| FC South End | Point Fortin | Manny Ramjohn Stadium | 10,000 | (Trinidad and Tobago) Leroy DeLeon | (Trinidad and Tobago) Anthony Rougier |
| Joe Public | Arouca | Marvin Lee Stadium | 6,000 | (Trinidad and Tobago) Derek King | (Trinidad and Tobago) Kerry Baptiste |
| Ma Pau | Woodbrook | Hasely Crawford Stadium | 27,000 | (Trinidad and Tobago) Michael McComie | (Trinidad and Tobago) Lyndon Andrews |
| Police | Saint James | Hasely Crawford Stadium | 27,000 | (Trinidad and Tobago) Richard De Coteau | (Trinidad and Tobago) Keron Archie |
| San Juan Jabloteh | San Juan | Hasely Crawford Stadium | 27,000 | (Saint Lucia) Earl Jean | (Trinidad and Tobago) Marvin Oliver |
| St. Ann's Rangers | San Juan | Hasely Crawford Stadium | 27,000 | (Trinidad and Tobago) Anthony Streete | (Trinidad and Tobago) Errol McFarlane |
| Tobago United | Bacolet | Dwight Yorke Stadium | 7,500 | (Trinidad and Tobago) Peter Granville | (Guyana) Kayode McKinnon |
| United Petrotrin | Pointe-à-Pierre | Palo Seco Velodrome | 10,000 | (Brazil) Marcos Tinoco | (Trinidad and Tobago) Cyd Gray |
| W Connection | Point Lisas | Manny Ramjohn Stadium | 10,000 | (Saint Lucia) Stuart Charles-Fevrier | (Saint Lucia) Elijah Joseph |

=== Managerial changes ===
| Team | Outgoing manager | Manner of departure | Date of vacancy | Table | Incoming manager | Date of appointment | Table |
|---|---|---|---|---|---|---|---|
| Police | Re-admitted team | | | | (Trinidad and Tobago) Richard De Coteau | 29 January 2009 | Pre-season |
| FC South End | Expansion team | | | | (Trinidad and Tobago) Leroy DeLeon | 9 May 2009 | Pre-season |
| United Petrotrin | (Trinidad and Tobago) Leon Carpette | End of caretaker contract | 18 December 2008 | 6th (2008) | (Brazil) Marcos Tinoco | 21 February 2009 | Pre-season |
| Defence Force | (Trinidad and Tobago) Kerry Jamerson | Sacked | 18 December 2008 | 8th (2008) | (Trinidad and Tobago) Ross Russell | 8 April 2009 | Pre-season |
| Ma Pau | (Trinidad and Tobago) Ronald La Forest | Sacked | 17 January 2009 | 9th (2008) | (Brazil) Ubirajara Veiga Da Silva | 21 January 2009 | Pre-season |
| Ma Pau | (Brazil) Ubirajara Veiga Da Silva | Mutual consent | 2 April 2009 | 9th (2008) | (Trinidad and Tobago) Michael McComie | 8 April 2009 | Pre-season |
| San Juan Jabloteh | (England) Terry Fenwick | Resigned | 17 April 2009 | 1st (2008) | (Saint Lucia) Earl Jean | 18 April 2009 | Pre-season |
| San Juan Jabloteh | (Saint Lucia) Earl Jean | Sacked | 26 November 2009 | 2nd | (England) Terry Fenwick | 26 November 2009 | Postseason |

== Regular season ==
=== Competition table ===
| Pos | Team | Pld | W | D | L | GF | GA | GD | Pts | Qualification |
|---|---|---|---|---|---|---|---|---|---|---|
| 1 | Joe Public (A) | 20 | 12 | 5 | 3 | 50 | 24 | +26 | 41 | Qualification for 2009 Pro League Big Six |
| 2 | Caledonia AIA (A) | 20 | 13 | 1 | 6 | 49 | 30 | +19 | 40 | Qualification for 2009 Pro League Big Six |
| 3 | San Juan Jabloteh (A) | 20 | 11 | 6 | 3 | 29 | 16 | +13 | 39 | Qualification for 2009 Pro League Big Six |
| 4 | W Connection (A) | 20 | 9 | 7 | 4 | 36 | 17 | +19 | 34 | Qualification for 2009 Pro League Big Six |
| 5 | Ma Pau (A) | 20 | 10 | 4 | 6 | 31 | 21 | +10 | 34 | Qualification for 2009 Pro League Big Six |
| 6 | Defence Force (A) | 20 | 9 | 5 | 6 | 36 | 26 | +10 | 32 | Qualification for 2009 Pro League Big Six |
| 7 | United Petrotrin | 20 | 7 | 9 | 4 | 32 | 21 | +11 | 30 | Team disbanded after season (Note: Following the season, United Petrotrin withdrew from the Pro League for the 2010–11 season.) |
| 8 | FC South End | 20 | 4 | 4 | 12 | 15 | 36 | −21 | 16 | |
| 9 | St. Ann's Rangers | 20 | 4 | 3 | 13 | 22 | 46 | −24 | 15 | |
| 10 | Tobago United | 20 | 2 | 7 | 11 | 17 | 32 | −15 | 13 | |
| 11 | Police | 20 | 2 | 3 | 15 | 16 | 64 | −48 | 9 | |

Updated to match(es) played on 20 September 2009. Source: TT Pro League
Rules for classification: 1) points; 2) goal difference; 3) number of goals scored.
(A) Advance to a further round

=== Results ===
| Home \ Away | CAL | DEF | SOE | JOE | MAP | POL | SJJ | RAN | TBU | UPE | WCO |
|---|---|---|---|---|---|---|---|---|---|---|---|
| Caledonia AIA | | 2–3 | 2–1 | 2–3 | 2–1 | 7–2 | 1–1 | 1–0 | 5–3 | 3–2 | 1–2 |
| Defence Force | 1–0 | | 4–1 | 4–3 | 2–3 | 4–0 | 0–1 | 0–2 | 3–1 | 0–0 | 1–2 |
| FC South End | 0–2 | 0–2 | | 0–2 | 1–0 | 2–0 | 0–1 | 2–0 | 0–3 | 1–4 | 1–1 |
| Joe Public | 2–3 | 3–3 | 1–0 | | 2–1 | 2–0 | 4–0 | 3–0 | 3–1 | 1–1 | 2–2 |
| Ma Pau | 4–2 | 3–0 | 2–0 | 3–2 | | 1–1 | 1–3 | 3–1 | 2–0 | 0–1 | 1–1 |
| Police | 2–6 | 1–5 | 0–0 | 0–7 | 1–0 | | 3–4 | 1–2 | 2–1 | 0–3 | 0–1 |
| San Juan Jabloteh | 2–0 | 1–0 | 5–0 | 0–0 | 0–1 | 3–0 | | 2–1 | 1–1 | 1–1 | 0–0 |
| St. Ann's Rangers | 0–6 | 2–3 | 0–2 | 3–5 | 0–2 | 3–3 | 1–0 | | 1–1 | 1–4 | 0–3 |
| Tobago United | 0–1 | 0–0 | 2–2 | 0–3 | 1–2 | 1–0 | 0–1 | 1–1 | | 0–0 | 0–0 |
| United Petrotrin | 0–1 | 1–1 | 2–2 | 0–0 | 0–0 | 4–0 | 1–1 | 2–4 | 3–0 | | 2–5 |
| W Connection | 1–2 | 0–0 | 3–0 | 1–2 | 1–1 | 8–0 | 1–2 | 2–0 | 2–1 | 0–1 | |

Updated to match(es) played on 20 September 2009. Source: TT Pro League
Legend: Blue = home team win; Yellow = draw; Red = away team win.

== Pro League Big Six ==
=== Competition table ===
| Pos | Team | Pld | W | D | L | GF | GA | GD | Pts |
|---|---|---|---|---|---|---|---|---|---|
| 1 | Joe Public (O) | 5 | 3 | 2 | 0 | 9 | 4 | +5 | 11 |
| 2 | San Juan Jabloteh | 5 | 3 | 1 | 1 | 10 | 9 | +1 | 10 |
| 3 | W Connection | 5 | 2 | 3 | 0 | 4 | 1 | +3 | 9 |
| 4 | Caledonia AIA | 5 | 2 | 1 | 2 | 5 | 4 | +1 | 7 |
| 5 | Ma Pau | 5 | 1 | 1 | 3 | 5 | 6 | −1 | 4 |
| 6 | Defence Force | 5 | 0 | 0 | 5 | 6 | 15 | −9 | 0 |

Updated to match(es) played on 27 October 2009. Source: TT Pro League
Rules for classification: 1) points; 2) goal difference; 3) number of goals scored.
(O) Play-off winners

=== Results ===
Round 1
| Home team | Score | Away team |
|---|---|---|
| San Juan Jabloteh | 5–4 | Defence Force |
| Ma Pau | 1–3 | Joe Public |
| W Connection | 1–0 | Caledonia AIA |

Round 2
| Home team | Score | Away team |
|---|---|---|
| Caledonia AIA | 1–0 | Ma Pau |
| W Connection | 2–0 | Defence Force |
| Joe Public | 3–1 | San Juan Jabloteh |

Round 3
| Home team | Score | Away team |
|---|---|---|
| Defence Force | 1–2 | Joe Public |
| Caledonia AIA | 1–2 | San Juan Jabloteh |
| Ma Pau | 0–0 | W Connection |

Round 4
| Home team | Score | Away team |
|---|---|---|
| San Juan Jabloteh | 1–1 | W Connection |
| Ma Pau | 4–1 | Defence Force |
| Joe Public | 1–1 | Caledonia AIA |

Round 5
| Home team | Score | Away team |
|---|---|---|
| Defence Force | 0–2 | Caledonia AIA |
| Joe Public | 0–0 | W Connection |
| San Juan Jabloteh | 1–0 | Ma Pau |

== League table ==
| Pos | Team | Pld | W | D | L | GF | GA | GD | Pts | Qualification |
|---|---|---|---|---|---|---|---|---|---|---|
| 1 | Joe Public (C) | 25 | 15 | 7 | 3 | 59 | 28 | +31 | 52 | 2010 CFU Club Championship First round |
| 2 | San Juan Jabloteh | 25 | 14 | 7 | 4 | 39 | 25 | +14 | 49 | 2010 CFU Club Championship Second round |
| 3 | Caledonia AIA | 25 | 15 | 2 | 8 | 54 | 34 | +20 | 47 | |
| 4 | W Connection | 25 | 11 | 10 | 4 | 40 | 18 | +22 | 43 | |
| 5 | Ma Pau | 25 | 11 | 5 | 9 | 36 | 27 | +9 | 38 | |
| 6 | Defence Force | 25 | 9 | 5 | 11 | 42 | 41 | +1 | 32 | |
| 7 | United Petrotrin | 20 | 7 | 9 | 4 | 32 | 21 | +11 | 30 | Team disbanded after season (Note: Following the season, United Petrotrin withdrew from the Pro League for the 2010–11 season.) |
| 8 | FC South End | 20 | 4 | 4 | 12 | 15 | 36 | −21 | 16 | |
| 9 | St. Ann's Rangers | 20 | 4 | 3 | 13 | 22 | 46 | −24 | 15 | |
| 10 | Tobago United | 20 | 2 | 7 | 11 | 17 | 32 | −15 | 13 | |
| 11 | Police | 20 | 2 | 3 | 15 | 16 | 64 | −48 | 9 | |

Updated to match(es) played on 27 October 2009. Source: TT Pro League
Rules for classification: 1) points; 2) goal difference; 3) number of goals scored.
(C) Champions

=== Positions by round ===
| Leader |
| 2010 CFU Club Championship Second round |
| Qualification to 2009 Pro League Big Six |
| Team disbanded after season |

The table lists the positions of teams after each week of matches. In order to preserve chronological evolvements, any postponed matches are not included to the round at which they were originally scheduled, but added to the full round they were played immediately afterwards. For example, if a match is scheduled for the tenth round of matches, but then postponed and played between rounds 16 and 17, it will be added to the standings for round 16.

| Team ╲ Round | 1 | 2 | 3 | 4 | 5 | 6 | 7 | 8 | 9 | 10 | 11 | 12 | 13 | 14 | 15 | 16 | 17 | 18 | 19 | 20 | 21 | 22 | 23 | 24 | 25 | 26 | 27 |
|---|---|---|---|---|---|---|---|---|---|---|---|---|---|---|---|---|---|---|---|---|---|---|---|---|---|---|---|
| Joe Public | 2 | 3 | 2 | 2 | 2 | 5 | 3 | 3 | 3 | 3 | 2 | 1 | 3 | 3 | 1 | 1 | 1 | 1 | 1 | 1 | 1 | 1 | 1 | 1 | 1 | 1 | 1 |
| San Juan Jabloteh | 4 | 1 | 1 | 1 | 1 | 1 | 1 | 1 | 1 | 1 | 1 | 2 | 1 | 2 | 3 | 3 | 4 | 5 | 3 | 2 | 2 | 3 | 2 | 3 | 2 | 2 | 2 |
| Caledonia AIA | 8 | 10 | 7 | 4 | 4 | 2 | 2 | 2 | 2 | 2 | 3 | 3 | 2 | 1 | 2 | 2 | 3 | 2 | 4 | 3 | 3 | 2 | 3 | 2 | 3 | 3 | 3 |
| W Connection | 10 | 8 | 5 | 6 | 3 | 6 | 6 | 6 | 6 | 4 | 4 | 4 | 4 | 4 | 4 | 4 | 2 | 4 | 5 | 5 | 4 | 4 | 4 | 4 | 4 | 4 | 4 |
| Ma Pau | 3 | 6 | 8 | 5 | 7 | 3 | 5 | 4 | 4 | 5 | 6 | 6 | 6 | 5 | 5 | 5 | 5 | 3 | 2 | 4 | 5 | 5 | 5 | 5 | 5 | 5 | 5 |
| Defence Force | 1 | 2 | 4 | 7 | 5 | 7 | 8 | 8 | 7 | 7 | 7 | 7 | 7 | 7 | 6 | 6 | 7 | 7 | 7 | 7 | 7 | 6 | 6 | 6 | 6 | 6 | 6 |
| United Petrotrin | 7 | 5 | 3 | 3 | 6 | 4 | 4 | 5 | 5 | 6 | 5 | 5 | 5 | 6 | 7 | 7 | 6 | 6 | 6 | 6 | 6 | 7 | 7 | 7 | 7 | 7 | 7 |
| FC South End | | 11 | 9 | 10 | 11 | 9 | 8 | 9 | 9 | 8 | 8 | 8 | 8 | 8 | 9 | 9 | 10 | 10 | 10 | 10 | 10 | 10 | 8 | 8 | 8 | 8 | 8 |
| St. Ann's Rangers | 6 | 7 | 9 | 9 | 8 | 9 | 7 | 7 | 9 | 9 | 9 | 10 | 10 | 8 | 8 | 8 | 8 | 8 | 8 | 8 | 8 | 9 | 9 | 9 | 9 | 9 | 9 |
| Tobago United | 9 | 11 | 11 | 10 | 11 | 11 | 11 | 11 | 11 | 11 | 11 | 11 | 11 | 11 | 11 | 9 | 9 | 9 | 9 | 9 | 9 | 10 | 10 | 10 | 10 | 10 | 10 |
| Police | 5 | 4 | 6 | 8 | 10 | 10 | 10 | 10 | 10 | 10 | 10 | 9 | 9 | 10 | 10 | 11 | 11 | 11 | 11 | 11 | 11 | 11 | 11 | 11 | 11 | 11 | 11 |

Updated to match(es) played on 27 October 2009. Source: TT Pro League

== Season statistics ==
=== Scoring ===
- First goal of the season: Walter Moore for Caledonia AIA against Joe Public, (8 May 2009).
- Last goal of the season: Akim Armstrong for Caledonia AIA against Defence Force, (27 October 2009).
- First own goal of the season: Randy Harris (Police) for United Petrotrin, (19 May 2009).
- First penalty kick of the season: Reginald Payne (scored) for Tobago United against Ma Pau (9 May 2009).
- First hat-trick of the season: Kendall Velox (Caledonia AIA) against Police, 22', 40', 62' (23 May 2009).
- Most goals scored by one player in a match: 5 goals
  - Kerry Baptiste (Joe Public) against St. Ann's Rangers, 13', 41', 45', 78', 88' (21 July 2009).
- Widest winning margin: 8 goals
  - W Connection 8–0 Police (4 September 2009)
- Most goals in a match: 9 goals
  - Caledonia AIA 7–2 Police (18 August 2009)
  - San Juan Jabloteh 5–4 Defence Force (15 October 2009)
- Most goals in one half: 7 goals
  - San Juan Jabloteh v Defence Force (15 October 2009) 1–1 at half-time, 5–4 final.
- Most goals in one half by a single team: 5 goals
  - W Connection v Police (4 September 2009) 5–0 at half-time, 8–0 final.

==== Top scorers ====
| Rank | Player | Club | Goals |
|---|---|---|---|
| 1 | (Trinidad and Tobago) Kerry Baptiste | Joe Public | 35 |
| 2 | (Trinidad and Tobago) Keyon Edwards | Caledonia AIA | 16 |
| 3 | (Trinidad and Tobago) Devorn Jorsling | Defence Force | 13 |
| 4 | (Trinidad and Tobago) Kevon Carter | Defence Force | 11 |
| 5 | (Trinidad and Tobago) Arnold Dwarika | United Petrotrin | 10 |
| 5 | (Dominican Republic) Jonathan Faña | W Connection | 10 |
| 7 | (Trinidad and Tobago) Anthony Wolfe | Ma Pau | 9 |
| 8 | (Trinidad and Tobago) Trevin Caesar | Ma Pau | 8 |
| 8 | (Saint Vincent and the Grenadines) Kendall Velox | Caledonia AIA | 8 |
| 10 | (Trinidad and Tobago) Noel Williams | San Juan Jabloteh | 7 |

==== Hat-tricks ====
| Player | For | Against | Result | Date | Ref(s) |
|---|---|---|---|---|---|
| (Saint Vincent and the Grenadines) Kendall Velox | Caledonia AIA | Police* | 2–6 | 23 May 2009 | |
| (Trinidad and Tobago) Keyon Edwards | Caledonia AIA | St. Ann's Rangers* | 0–6 | 16 June 2009 | |
| (Trinidad and Tobago) Keyon Edwards | Caledonia AIA* | Tobago United | 5–3 | 23 June 2009 | |
| (Trinidad and Tobago) Kerry Baptiste^{5} | Joe Public | St. Ann's Rangers* | 3–5 | 21 July 2009 | |
| (Trinidad and Tobago) Kerry Baptiste | Joe Public | Defence Force* | 4–3 | 4 August 2009 | |
| (Trinidad and Tobago) Anthony Wolfe | Ma Pau* | Caledonia AIA | 4–2 | 14 August 2009 | |
| (Trinidad and Tobago) Aurtis Whitley | United Petrotrin | St. Ann's Rangers* | 1–4 | 22 August 2009 | |
| (Trinidad and Tobago) Devorn Jorsling | Defence Force | Police* | 1–5 | 22 August 2009 | |
| (Trinidad and Tobago) Devorn Jorsling | Defence Force | St. Ann's Rangers* | 2–3 | 28 August 2009 | |
| (Trinidad and Tobago) Kerry Baptiste^{4} | Joe Public | Police* | 0–7 | 29 August 2009 | |
| (Trinidad and Tobago) Conrad Smith | Joe Public | Police* | 0–7 | 29 August 2009 | |
| (Trinidad and Tobago) Andrei Pacheco | W Connection | United Petrotrin* | 2–5 | 29 August 2009 | |
| (Dominican Republic) Jonathan Faña^{4} | W Connection* | Police | 8–0 | 4 September 2009 | |
| (Sierra Leone) Alusine Bangura | W Connection* | Police | 8–0 | 4 September 2009 | |
| (Trinidad and Tobago) Richard Roy^{4} | Defence Force | San Juan Jabloteh* | 5–4 | 15 October 2009 | |
| (Trinidad and Tobago) Noel Williams^{4} | San Juan Jabloteh* | Defence Force | 5–4 | 15 October 2009 | |

- * Home team score first in result
- ^{4} Player scored four goals
- ^{5} Player scored five goals

=== Discipline ===
- First yellow card of the season: Nuru Abdallah Muhammad for Caledonia AIA against Joe Public, (8 May 2009).
- First red card of the season: Mark Leslie for Ma Pau against Tobago United, (9 May 2009).
- Most yellow cards in a single match: 6
  - W Connection 0–1 United Petrotrin – 2 for W Connection (Eder Gilmar Aras & Gerard Williams) and 4 for United Petrotrin (Cyd Gray, Lyndon Diaz, Ghymo Harper & Nigel Daniel) (23 June 2009)
  - Joe Public 1–1 United Petrotrin – 3 for Joe Public (Kerry Baptiste, Keyeno Thomas & Jason Springer) and 3 for United Petrotrin (Cyd Gray, Makan Hislop & Luis Andre Lima) (25 July 2009)
- Most red cards in a single match: 2
  - W Connection 0–1 United Petrotrin – 2 for W Connection (Eder Gilmar Arias & Marvin Phillip) (23 June 2009)
  - San Juan Jabloteh 3–0 Police – 1 for San Juan Jabloteh (Noel Williams) and 1 for Police (Devon Bristol) (3 July 2009)

== Awards ==
=== Round awards ===
| Round | Player of the Round | Round's Statline |
|---|---|---|
| Round One | (Trinidad and Tobago) Kerry Baptiste (Joe Public) | 10 GP, 13 G, Joe Public 6-3-1 in Round One |
| Round Two | (Trinidad and Tobago) Kerry Baptiste (Joe Public) | 10 GP, 22 G, Joe Public 6-2-2 in Round Two |

=== Annual awards ===
The 2009 TT Pro League awards distribution took place on 7 April 2010, at Cascadia Hotel in St. Ann's, Trinidad, prior to the 2010–11 season.

Joe Public took home the majority of the league honours including Team of the Year. Eastern Lion Kerry Baptiste was named the league's Player of the Year for the first time in his career, by providing 35 league goals. Baptiste also received the Golden Boot and was named the Best Forward. Joe Public manager Derek King became the youngest manager in the Pro League to win the league championship and claimed the Manager of the Year. In addition, Joe Public's Alejandro Figueroa, Trent Noel, and Keyeno Thomas were named the league's Best Goalkeeper, Best Midfielder, and Best Defender respectively. The remaining team award was won by Caledonia AIA for the Most Disciplined Team of the Year. FIFA international referee, Neal Brizan, won the Referee of the Year for the third consecutive year, whereas Boris Punch won the Match Commissioner of the Year in back-to-back years.

| Award | Winner |
|---|---|
| Player of the Year | (Trinidad and Tobago) Kerry Baptiste (Joe Public) |
| Manager of the Year | (Trinidad and Tobago) Derek King (Joe Public) |
| Best Goalkeeper | (Colombia) Alejandro Figueroa (Joe Public) |
| Best Defender | (Trinidad and Tobago) Keyeno Thomas (Joe Public) |
| Best Midfielder | (Trinidad and Tobago) Trent Noel (Joe Public) |
| Best Forward | (Trinidad and Tobago) Kerry Baptiste (Joe Public) |
| Golden Boot | (Trinidad and Tobago) Kerry Baptiste (Joe Public) |
| Team of the Year | Joe Public |
| Most Disciplined Team of the Year | Caledonia AIA |
| Referee of the Year | Neal Brizan |
| Assistant Referee of the Year | Ainsley Rochard |
| Match Commissioner of the Year | Boris Punch |
