= 2009 Trinidad and Tobago FA Trophy =

2009 FA Trophy
Trinidad and Tobago Cup

Tournament details
- Country: Trinidad and Tobago
- Teams: 32

Final positions
- Champions: Joe Public (PL)
- Runners-up: W Connection

Tournament statistics
- Matches played: 31
- Goals scored: 133 (4.29 per match)
- Top goal scorer: Conrad Smith (8 goals)

The 2009 Trinidad and Tobago FA Trophy was the 80th season of the FA Trophy, which is the oldest football competition for teams in Trinidad and Tobago. The tournament took place at the conclusion of the 2009 TT Pro League season. Caledonia AIA entered as the tournament's defending champion. The tournament commenced on 15 November, with 32 teams competing in single elimination matches and concluded on 9 December.

== Qualification ==
The tournament featured teams from the top three levels of the football pyramid. These three levels and 8 leagues, namely the TT Pro League, National Super League, Central FA's Premier Division, Eastern FA's Premier Division, Eastern Counties' Football Union, Northern FA's Premier Division, Southern FA's Premier Division, and Tobago FA's Premier Division, each have their own separate qualification process to trim their ranks down to their final team delegations.

The top eight finishers in the Pro League for the 2009 season all qualified for the competition. In addition, the top seven finishers from the Super League also qualified. However, only three clubs from 5 of the 6 regional football associations were awarded qualification into this year's edition, with the Tobago FA as the exception as they only received two.

The following clubs qualified for the 80th edition of the FA Trophy:

| TT Pro League; 8 teams | National Super League; 7 teams | Regional FA Leagues; 17 teams | |
| Caledonia AIA; Defence Force; FC South End; Joe Public; Ma Pau; San Juan Jabloteh; United Petrotrin; W Connection | Club Sando; Defence Force; Economy Strikers; Joe Public; Queen's Park; 1976 FC Phoenix; T&TEC | Central FA – Premier Division: Leeds United; St. Mary's United; Strugglers; Eastern FA – Premier Division: Joe Public; Trinidad and Tobago Air Guard/Coast Guard; Valtrin United; Eastern Counties – Football Union: Biche United; Grand Lagoon United; Valencia United | Northern FA – Premier Division: Dathea Copious Suns; Malvern United; Queen's Park; Southern FA – Premier Division: K-Brands; Palo Seco; Siparia Spurs; Tobago FA – Premier Division: Roxborough Lakers; Stokely Vale |

== Schedule ==
The schedule for the 2009 FA Trophy, as announced by the Trinidad and Tobago Football Association:

| Round | Date | Matches | Clubs | New entries this round |
|---|---|---|---|---|
| First round | 15 November 2009 | 16 | 32 → 16 | 32: 1st–32nd |
| Second round | 23 November 2009 | 8 | 16 → 8 | |
| Quarterfinals | 30 November 2009 | 4 | 8 → 4 | |
| Semifinals | 7 December 2009 | 2 | 4 → 2 | |
| Final | 9 December 2009 | 1 | 2 → 1 | |

== Results ==
All matches were played over two 45 minute halves, and in the process if the match were drawn at the end of regulation time, then two additional 15-minute halves were used, and if necessary, penalty kicks if still drawn after extra time.

=== First round ===
The draw for the most prestigious knockout tournament held by the Trinidad and Tobago Football Association was made on 2 November 2009 at its head office in Port of Spain, Trinidad with ties played in the week beginning 15 November 2009. The only Pro League match-up featured W Connection against FC South End. As a result, seven Pro League clubs advanced to the next round with little difficulty. The lone upset of the round occurred when Joe Public from the Eastern FA Premier Division defeated Club Sando of the National Super League.

| Tie no | Home team | Score | Away team |
|---|---|---|---|
| 1 | Queen's Park (NFA) | 0–8 | San Juan Jabloteh |
| 2 | Strugglers | 1–4 | United Petrotrin |
| 3 | Club Sando | 0–1 | Joe Public (EFA) |
| 4 | Roxborough Lakers | 1–1 | Siparia Spurs |
1–1 after extra time – Siparia Spurs won 5–4 on penalties
| 5 | T&TEC | 3–1 | St. Mary's United |
| 6 | Dathea Copious Suns | 3–0 | Malvern United |
| 7 | K-Brands | 2–2 | Valtrin United |
2–2 after extra time – Valtrin United won 3–0 on penalties
| 8 | Joe Public (PL) | 12–0 | Grand Lagoon United |

| Tie no | Home team | Score | Away team |
|---|---|---|---|
| 9 | Queen's Park (SL) | 0–6 | Caledonia AIA |
| 10 | W Connection | 1–1 | FC South End |
1–1 after extra time – W Connection won 3–0 on penalties
| 11 | Stokely Vale | 0–5 | Defence Force (PL) |
| 12 | Economy Strikers | w/o | T&T AG/CG |
Awarded to T&T AG/CG, Unfit ground at Economy Strikers
| 13 | Ma Pau | 7–1 | 1976 FC Phoenix |
| 14 | Defence Force (SL) | 4–3 | Leeds United |
| 15 | Valencia United | 0–7 | Joe Public (SL) |
| 16 | Biche United | w/o | Palo Seco |
Awarded to Palo Seco, Unfit ground at Biche United

=== Second round ===
The draw for the second round took place on 16 November 2009 and involved the 16 winning teams from the first round. These were from the following levels:

- 7 from Level 1 (TT Pro League)
- 3 from Level 2 (National Super League)
- 6 from Level 3 (3 EFA Premier Division, 1 NFA Premier Division, 2 SFA Premier Division)

Matches in the second round were played in the week commencing 23 November 2009. The main match-up in the round featured rivals San Juan Jabloteh and W Connection. In the end, Jabloteh were defeated 3–1 and finished their 2009 season without a trophy for the first time in five years. In the other all-Pro League fixture, Keyon Edwards scored two late goals to guarantee Caledonia AIA a place in the quarterfinals after a 2–0 victory over Defence Force (PL). Valtrin United stunned Defence Force (SL) 2–1 with a penalty converted by Matthew Ramirez in the 90th minute.

| Tie no | Home team | Score | Away team |
|---|---|---|---|
| 1 | Joe Public (PL) | 7–1 | Dathea Copious Suns |
| 2 | Joe Public (SL) | 1–4 | Ma Pau |
| 3 | United Petrotrin | 0–0 | T&TEC |
United Petrotrin won 1–0 after extra time
| 4 | Palo Seco | 0–3 | Joe Public (EFA) |
| 5 | W Connection | 3–1 | San Juan Jabloteh |
| 6 | Siparia Spurs | 3–2 | T&T AG/CG |
| 7 | Caledonia AIA | 2–0 | Defence Force (PL) |
| 8 | Defence Force (SL) | 1–2 | Valtrin United |

=== Quarterfinals ===
The draw for the quarterfinals took place on 25 November 2009 and involved the 8 winning teams from the second round. These were from the following levels:

- 5 from Level 1 (TT Pro League)
- 0 from Level 2 (National Super League)
- 3 from Level 3 (2 EFA Premier Division, 1 SFA Premier Division)

Matches in the quarterfinals were played on 30 November 2009. Hughton Hector scored a hat-trick to lead W Connection to a 5–1 win over Valtrin United. In the only all-Pro League encounter, Caledonia AIA and Ma Pau ended 1–1 after regulation time following a late equaliser from Stallions' Kerry Daniel in the 90th minute. Caledonia AIA won the match 6–5 on penalties. In the other two quarterfinal matches at Marvin Lee Stadium, Joe Public (PL) won the battle of Tunapuna by defeating Joe Public (EFA) by a score of 6 to 0. United Petrotrin avoided giant-killers Siparia Spurs by a 3–1 scoreline to make it an all-Pro League semifinals.

| 30 November 2009 | Caledonia AIA (1) | 1–1 (6–5 p) | Ma Pau (1) | Macoya, Trinidad |
| 17:00 (UTC-4) | Daniel 90' | | James 39' | Stadium: Marvin Lee Stadium; Referee: Neal Brizan |
| | Penalties |
| | Jerome (penalty scored); Joseph (penalty scored); Moore (penalty missed); David (penalty scored); Daniel (penalty scored); Phillips (penalty scored); Ambrose (penalty scored) | | Wolfe (penalty scored); Samuel (penalty scored); Andrews (penalty scored); Gonzales (penalty scored); Williams (penalty missed); Britto (penalty scored); Freitas (penalty missed) |

| 30 November 2009 | W Connection (1) | 5–1 | Valtrin United (3) | Couva, Trinidad |
| 17:00 (UTC-4) | Hector 2', 30', 86'; Viveros 56'; Diaz 79' | | Lewis 41' | Stadium: Ato Boldon Stadium |

| 30 November 2009 | Joe Public (3) | 0–6 | Joe Public (1) | Macoya, Trinidad |
| 19:00 (UTC-4) | | | Baptiste 27', 54', 71', 76'; Power 31'; Tinto 72' (o.g.) | Stadium: Marvin Lee Stadium |

| 30 November 2009 | Siparia Spurs (3) | 1–3 | United Petrotrin (1) | Couva, Trinidad |
| 19:00 (UTC-4) | Collins 63' | | Lima 35'; Glasgow 64'; Hinkson 82' | Stadium: Ato Boldon Stadium |

=== Semifinals ===
The draw for the semifinals took place on 1 December 2009. It consisted of Caledonia AIA, Joe Public (PL), United Petrotrin, and W Connection from the Pro League (1). The semifinal matches took place at Marvin Lee Stadium on 7 December 2009. W Connection defeated United Petrotrin 1–0 to reach the final of the competition. The lone goal in the match came from Jonathan Faña, who netted the winner in the 82nd minute. In the other semifinal, Joe Public (PL) defeated Caledonia AIA 3–1 to advance to the final.

| 7 December 2009 | W Connection (1) | 1–0 | United Petrotrin (1) | Macoya, Trinidad |
| 17:00 (UTC-4) | Faña 82' | Report | | Stadium: Marvin Lee Stadium |

| 7 December 2009 | Joe Public (1) | 3–1 | Caledonia AIA (1) | Macoya, Trinidad |
| 19:00 (UTC-4) | Lewis 33'; Baptiste 57' (pen.); Leacock 90+3' | Report | Joseph 29' | Stadium: Marvin Lee Stadium |

=== Final ===
The final was played at Marvin Lee Stadium in Macoya, Trinidad on 9 December 2009. The match was contested by Joe Public (PL), who defeated Caledonia AIA 3–1 in their semifinal, and W Connection who beat United Petrotrin 1–0. Joe Public (PL) used an own goal by Eder Gilmer Arias in the 90th minute to force extra time after the match ended 2–2. The Eastern Lions then capitalized in the 117th minute when, the tournament's leading scorer with eight goals, Conrad Smith slotted home the winner. The win marked Joe Public's fourth title of the year. Whereas, W Connection's suffered their second consecutive loss in the final.

| 9 December 2009 | Joe Public (1) | 3–2 | W Connection (1) | Macoya, Trinidad |
| 19:00 (UTC-4) | Baptiste 15'; Arias 90' (o.g.); Smith 117' | Report | Leon 37'; Bartholomew 81' | Stadium: Marvin Lee Stadium; Referee: Neal Brizan |
