= List of Trinidad and Tobago FA Trophy winners =

Casuals won their fourth and most recent FA Trophy in 1958 when they defeated Trinidad Petroleum Development

The following is a list of Trinidad and Tobago FA Trophy winners, since its inception in 1927. The FA Trophy, is a knockout cup competition in Trinidad and Tobago football, organised by the Trinidad and Tobago Football Association. It is the oldest football competition in Trinidad and Tobago. The tournament is open to all clubs in the top three levels of the football pyramid. The competition culminates in January with the FA Trophy final, which has traditionally been regarded as the showpiece finale of the Trinidad and Tobago football season.

The record for the most wins is held by Maple Club and Malvern United, with seven victories, followed by Defence Force and United British Oilfields Trinidad with six, United Petrotrin with five, and Shamrock, Casuals, Everton, and W Connection with four. The cup has been won by the same team in two or more consecutive years on nine occasions, and seven teams. In fact, Everton remains the only club to have won the trophy four consecutive years from 1929 to 1932. The current holders of the FA Trophy are North East Stars, who defeated fellow Pro League side W Connection in the 2014–15 final on 29 March 2015.

== Finals ==
Until 1999, a draw in the final would result in the match being replayed at a later date. However, if the replay resulted in another draw or the replay could not be scheduled, then the two teams shared the trophy. The lone exception occurred in 1985 when Defence Force defeated Trintoc by a penalty shootout following extra time. Since then the final has always been decided on the day, with a penalty shootout as required. So far, a penalty shootout has been required on only three occasions, in the 2000, 2003, and 2006 finals.

=== Results ===
Key
*	Match decided in extra time
^{†}	Match decided by a penalty shootout after regulation time
^{‡}	Match decided by a penalty shootout after extra time
**Bold**	Winning team also won the league championship
Italics	Team from outside the top level of Trinidad and Tobago football

Season	Winner	Score	Runners–up	Venue
1927	Shamrock	4–2	Leaseholds	
1928	Southern Casuals			
1929	Everton	3–2	Maple Club	
1930	**Everton** (2)			
1931	**Everton** (3)			
1932	**Everton** (4)			
1933	Season not contested			
1934	**Casuals** (2)			
1935	Sporting Club			
1936	Shamrock (2)			
1937	United British Oilfields Trinidad	3–2	Shamrock	
1938	West Ham	2–0	San Fernando	
1939	Casuals (3)			
1940	Maple Club			
1941	United British Oilfields Trinidad (2)			
1942 (R)	Spitfire	3–2	Colts	
1943 (R)	United British Oilfields Trinidad (3)	3–1	Sporting Club	
1944	Colts (2)	1–0	Sheffield	
1945	**Colts** (3)	5–0	Forest Reserve	
1946	Maple Club (2)			
1947	Notre Dame	2–1	United British Oilfields Trinidad	
1948	Colts (2)			
1949	Maple Club (3)		Carlton	
1950	United British Oilfields Trinidad (4)	3–1	Hurricanes	
1951	United British Oilfields Trinidad (5)	1–1*	Providence	
1952	Malvern United	2–1	United British Oilfields Trinidad	
1953	**Maple Club** (4)	1–0	Juniors	
1954	United British Oilfields Trinidad (6)	4–0	Providence	
1955	Malvern United (2)	1–0	United British Oilfields Trinidad	
1956	Trinidad Petroleum Development	2–0	Notre Dame	
1957	Shamrock (3)	2–2*	Shell	
1958	Casuals (4)	1–0	Trinidad Petroleum Development	
1959	**Shamrock** (4)	1–0	BP Fyzabad	
1960	Malvern United (3)	2–0	Trinidad Petroleum Development	
1961	Malvern United (4)	1–1*	BP Fyzabad	
1962	Dynamos	1–0	BP Fyzabad	
1963	**Maple Club** (5)	3–0	Malvern United	
1964	**Paragon**	1–0	BP Palo Seco	
1965	Malvern United (5)		BP Palo Seco	
1966	Juniors		Regiment	
1967	**Regiment**	4–3	Juniors	
1968	Malvern United (6)			
1969	Point Fortin Civic	4–2	Harvard	
1970	Maple Club (6)	3–0	Texaco	
1971	Season not contested			
1972	Maple Club (7)	3–0	Texaco	
1973	Season not contested			
1974	**Defence Force**			
1975	Police			
1976	Falcons			
1977	Malvern United (7)	2–1	Caroni	
1978	Falcons (2)			
1979–1980	Season not contested			
1981	**Defence Force** (2)	5–0	Memphis	
1982	**ASL Sports Club**			
1983	**ASL Sports Club** (2)			
1984	Motown United			
1985	**Defence Force** (3)	1–1^{‡}	Trintoc	
1986	**Trintoc**			
1987	La Brea Angels			
1988	**Trintoc** (2)			
1989	**Defence Force** (4)			
1990	Police (2)	^{‡}	Superstar Rangers	
1991	Defence Force (5)			
1992	Motown United (2)			
1993	Trintoc (3)			
1994 (R)	**Police** (3)	1–1^{‡}	Superstar Rangers	
1995	United Petrotrin (4)		Defence Force	
1996	**Defence Force** (6)		Police	
1997	United Petrotrin (5)	3–1	Superstar Rangers	Queen's Park Oval
1998	San Juan Jabloteh	3–2*	Defence Force	
1999	W Connection	2–1*	Joe Public	Marvin Lee Stadium
2000	**W Connection** (2)	1–1^{†}	Joe Public	Gilbert Park
2001	Joe Public	1–0	Carib	Marvin Lee Stadium
2002	W Connection (3)	5–1	Arima Fire	Marvin Lee Stadium
2003	North East Stars	2–2^{‡}	W Connection	Marvin Lee Stadium
2004	Season not finished			
2005	San Juan Jabloteh (2)	2–1	Defence Force	Marvin Lee Stadium
2006	WASA	3–3^{‡}	North East Stars	Ato Boldon Stadium
2007	Joe Public (2)	1–0	Caledonia AIA	Marvin Lee Stadium
2008	Caledonia AIA	3–2	W Connection	Marvin Lee Stadium
2009	**Joe Public** (3)	3–2*	W Connection	Marvin Lee Stadium
2010–11	San Juan Jabloteh (3)	1–0	North East Stars	Marvin Lee Stadium
2011–12	Caledonia AIA (2)	1–0	Defence Force	Manny Ramjohn Stadium
2012–13	Caledonia AIA (3)	2–0	Central FC	Ato Boldon Stadium
2013–14	**W Connection** (4)	2–2^{‡}	Central FC	Ato Boldon Stadium
2014–15	North East Stars (2)	0–0^{‡}	W Connection	Ato Boldon Stadium
2015–16	Season not played			
2016–17	Season not played			
2017	W Connection (5)	3–1	Police	Ato Boldon Stadium

== Results by team ==
Club	Wins	Last final won	Runners-up	Last final lost
Malvern United	7	1977	1	1963
Maple Club	7	1972	1	1929
Defence Force	6	1996	4	2011–12
United British Oilfields Trinidad	6	1954	3	1955
W Connection	5	2017	4	2014–15
United Petrotrin	5	1997	1	1985
Shamrock	4	1959	1	1937
Casuals	4	1958	0	
Everton	4	1932	0	
Joe Public	3	2009	2	2000
Police	3	1994	2	2017
Caledonia AIA	3	2012–13	1	2007
Colts	3	1948	1	1942
San Juan Jabloteh	3	2010–11	0	
North East Stars	2	2014–15	2	2010–11
Motown United	2	1992	0	
ASL Sports Club	2	1983	0	
Falcons	2	1978	0	
Juniors	1	1966	2	1967
BP Fyzabad	1	1961	2	1962
Trinidad Petroleum Development	1	1956	2	1960
Regiment	1	1967	1	1966
BP Palo Seco	1	1965	1	1964
Providence	1	1951	1	1954
Notre Dame	1	1947	1	1956
Sporting Club	1	1935	1	1943
WASA	1	2006	0	
La Brea Angels	1	1987	0	
Point Fortin Civic	1	1969	0	
Paragon	1	1964	0	
Dynamos	1	1962	0	
Shell	1	1957	0	
Carlton	1	1949	0	
Spitfire	1	1942	0	
West Ham	1	1938	0	
Superstar Rangers	0		3	1997
Central FC	0		2	2013–14
Texaco	0		2	1972
Arima Fire	0		1	2002
Carib	0		1	2001
Memphis	0		1	1981
Harvard	0		1	1969
Hurricanes	0		1	1950
Forest Reserve	0		1	1945
Sheffield	0		1	1944
Leaseholds	0		1	1927
