= Marcos Tinoco =

Brazilian football coach

Personal information
- Full name: Marcos Aurelio Tinoco
- Place of birth: Brazil

Managerial career
- Years: Team
- Portuguesa
- Botafogo (staff)
- Vasco da Gama (staff)
- Americano Futebol Clube
- Fortaleza
- 2003–2005: Cayman Islands
- 2009: United Petrotrin F.C.
- 2010: Tanzania U17
- 2010–2014: Cayman Islands (technical director)

Marcos Tinoco is a Brazilian FIFA Technical Officer and former coach.

== Coaching career ==
Through one of Tinoco's college contacts, he received an invitation to become the Cayman Islands national football team's head coach in 2003. Accepting the offer, the Brazilian faced obstruction in selecting players due to the small population and the lack of enthusiasm for football. To qualify for the 2006 FIFA World Cup, his team had to play a two-match leg against Cuba in 2004, losing both times. Next, Tinoco continued his managing career and assumed the role of head coach of the TT Pro League's United Petrotrin F.C. in 2009;his aim was to take charge of the senior squad, to expedite a developmental program, and to gain entry into the 2009 CFU Club Championship. Tinoco's decided to sign players Aurtis Whitley, Arnold Dwarika, Stokely Mason, Nigel Pierre, Cyd Gray, Ian Gray, and Gary Glasgow for the 2009 TT Pro League. The team also went on a two-week preseason camp in Colombia, where they played four friendlies – winning one, tying one, and losing the other two under Tinoco. In the course of his stay there, the coach was involved in a fight with Earl Jean, then coach of San Juan Jabloteh; he later apologized for his imprudent behavior.

=== Tanzania ===
At the 2010 Under-17 Copa Coca-Cola, Tinoco was the coach of the Tanzania U17. One of the coaches eyeing the Tanzania national team job in 2010, has criticized the Tanzania Football Federation for its management and commitment on youth football.

=== FIFA ===
Technical director of the Cayman Islands Football Association from 2010 to 2014, Tinoco became a FIFA Technical Development Officer for the CONCACAF region in 2014. With FIFA Development Officer Angenie Kanhai, he visited the Clyde Best Centre of Excellence in Bermuda to discuss football development with the Bermuda Football Association
