= Cyd Gray =

Trinidadian footballer (born 1976)

Cyd Gray CM
Personal information
- Full name: Cyd Gray
- Date of birth: 21 November 1976 (age 49)
- Place of birth: Scarborough, Trinidad and Tobago
- Height: 1.73 m (5 ft 8 in)
- Position: Defender

Senior career*
Years	Team	Apps	(Gls)
1997–2000	Joe Public	85	(10)
2001–2007	San Juan Jabloteh		
2008	Pune FC		
2008	San Juan Jabloteh		
2009	United Petrotrin	4	(0)
2010	Ma Pau SC	3	(0)

International career
2001–2010	Trinidad and Tobago	48	(1)
- * Club domestic league appearances and goals

Cyd Gray CM (born 21 November 1976) is a former professional footballer from Trinidad and Tobago. He previously played as a defender for San Juan Jabloteh, as well as the islands' national team. He made his debut for the Soca Warriors against Costa Rica in 2001.

As a member of the Trinidad and Tobago squad that competed at the 2006 FIFA World Cup in Germany, Gray was awarded the Chaconia Medal (Gold Class), the second highest state decoration of Trinidad and Tobago.
