= Derek King (footballer, born 1980) =

Trinbagonian footballer

Personal information
- Full name: Derek Terrion King
- Date of birth: 12 April 1980 (age 46)
- Place of birth: Arima, Trinidad and Tobago
- Position: Defender

Team information
- Current team: Trinidad and Tobago (head coach)

Senior career*
Years	Team	Apps	(Gls)
1999	Williams Connection		
2000–2006	Joe Public		

International career
1999–2005	Trinidad and Tobago	33	(1)

Managerial career
- 2008–2011: Joe Public
- 2012–2015: Trinidad and Tobago U20
- 2013–2016: Trinidad and Tobago (assistant)
- 2017–2018: North East Stars
- 2018: Santa Rosa
- 2018–2019: HFX Wanderers (assistant)
- 2019–2020: Trinidad and Tobago U20
- 2019–2023: Trinidad and Tobago (assistant)
- 2024: Trinidad and Tobago
- 2026: Trinidad and Tobago (interim)
- 2026–: Trinidad and Tobago
- * Club domestic league appearances and goals

Derek Terrion King (born 12 April 1980) is a Trinbagonian football manager and former player who serves as head coach of the Trinidad and Tobago national football team. He was the head coach of the Trinidad and Tobago national under-20 football team and an assistant coach for the Trinidad and Tobago national football team.

== Playing career ==
King was named in the team for 2000 CONCACAF Gold Cup and the 2005 Caribbean Cup. He made his international debut for Trinidad and Tobago against South Africa at the age of 19.

== Coaching career ==
=== Joe Public ===
In 2009, King won his first league championship as a manager with Joe Public, also winning the Trinidad and Tobago FA Trophy and Trinidad and Tobago Classic while being named TT Pro League Manager of the Year.

=== Trinidad and Tobago ===
From June 2013 until November 2016, King served as an assistant coach of the Trinidad and Tobago national team under Stephen Hart.

King was put in charge of the Trinidad and Tobago national under-20 football team for the 2015 CONCACAF U-20 Championship.

=== North East Stars ===
In 2017, King led North East Stars to the club's second-ever TT Pro League title.

King departed North East Stars in February 2018 after the league imposed a new wage structure which severely limited the salaries of players and technical staff.

=== Santa Rosa ===
On 3 April 2018, King joined TT Super League side Santa Rosa and led the club to a league championship that season. He was subsequently named the league's Coach of the Year.

=== HFX Wanderers ===
King joined Stephen Hart's coaching staff for HFX Wanderers's inaugural season in December 2018. In December 2019 King announced he was departing Halifax to return to Trinidad and Tobago.

=== Return to Trinidad and Tobago ===
Upon his departure from the HFX Wanderers King was announced as the new assistant coach for Trinidad and Tobago under Terry Fenwick. He will also serve as the head coach for the Trinidad and Tobago under-20 side.

== Honours ==
Joe Public

- TT Pro League: 2009
- Trinidad and Tobago FA Trophy: 2009
- Trinidad and Tobago Classic: 2009

North East Stars

- TT Pro League: 2017

Santa Rosa

- TT Super League: 2018

Individual

- TT Pro League Manager of the Year: 2009
- TT Super League Coach of the Year: 2018
