= Michael McComie =

Trinidad and Tobago footballer and coach (1972–2018)

Personal information
- Date of birth: 22 April 1972
- Date of death: 4 December 2018 (aged 46)
- Position: Goalkeeper

Youth career
- St Augustine Secondary

Senior career*
Years	Team	Apps	(Gls)
1997	San Juan Jabloteh		
1999–2004	Joe Public		

International career
1991	Trinidad and Tobago U20		
1998–2003	Trinidad and Tobago	5	(0)

Managerial career
- Joe Public
- 2007–2008: Joe Public
- Ma Pau Stars
- Guaya United
- Trinidad and Tobago U20
- 2016: FC Maracas
- * Club domestic league appearances and goals

Michael McComie (22 April 1972 – 4 December 2018) was a Trinidadian football player and coach.

As a player, McComie played as a goalkeeper at both professional and international levels. He later became an award-winning coach.

== Playing career ==
=== Club career ===
As a youth McComie played for St Augustine Secondary, and was recognised for his ability in what was described as a "talented" team led by Jerren Nixon. He played senior football in the TT Pro League for San Juan Jabloteh and Joe Public. His transfer between the clubs involved a five-figure transfer fee. He also played indoor football in the United States. He retired from playing in 2004.

=== International career ===
McComie represented Trinidad and Tobago under-20s at the 1991 FIFA World Youth Championship. He earned five caps for the senior team. His international career was hampered by the availability of other Trinidadian goalkeepers such as Shaka Hislop, Ross Russell, Kelvin Jack and Clayton Ince.

=== Playing style ===
McComie was renowned for his playing forward of the traditional goalkeeper's position acting almost as a defensive sweeper at a time when relatively few goalkeepers chose to play the ball in the outfield; he also played on occasion as a midfielder or striker.

== Coaching career ==
McComie worked as an assistant coach to the Trinidad and Tobago under-23 team before returning to Joe Public for the second time in July 2007. He was replaced by Keith Griffith in July 2008, but continued to work with the Trinidad and Tobago under-17 team. While with Joe Public he won the TT Pro League Manager of the Year award.

He also managed Ma Pau Stars, Guaya United and the Trinidad and Tobago under-20 team. He ended his career with FC Maracas in 2016.

== Later life and death ==
McComie also played table tennis, and served on the board of the Trinidad and Tobago Table Tennis Association.

McComie died on 4 December 2018, at the age of 46, from a brain tumour which was diagnosed only 24 hours previously. He had four daughters.
