= Mauricio Montezuma =

Venezuelan footballer (born 1993)

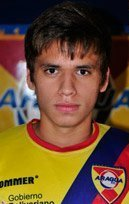

Personal information
- Full name: Mauricio Ali Montezuma Peña
- Date of birth: 31 March 1993 (age 33)
- Place of birth: Maracay, Venezuela
- Height: 1.81 m (5 ft 11 1/2 in)
- Position: Midfielder

Team information
- Current team: San Juan Jabloteh
- Number: 24

Youth career
- 2000–2008: UCV

Senior career*
Years	Team	Apps	(Gls)
2008–2010	Universidad Central	9	(0)
2010–2013	Aragua	82	(51)
2014–	San Juan Jabloteh		
- * Club domestic league appearances and goals

Mauricio Ali Montezuma Peña (born March 1993 in Maracay) is a Venezuelan football player who plays for San Juan Jabloteh in Trinidad and Tobago of the TT Pro League, as a central midfielder.
