= Keyeno Thomas =

Trinidad and Tobago footballer

Personal information
- Date of birth: 29 December 1977 (age 48)
- Place of birth: Point Fortin, Trinidad and Tobago
- Height: 1.88 m (6 ft 2 in)
- Position: Defender

Senior career*
| Years | Team | Apps | (Gls) |
| 1997–1999 | Joe Public | | |
| 2000–2001 | Colorado Rapids | 12 | (0) |
| 2001–2003 | Joe Public | | |
| 2004–2006 | San Juan Jabloteh | | |
| 2007–? | Joe Public | | |
| 2010–2011 | Ma Pau S.C. | | |

International career^{‡}
| 1998–2009 | Trinidad & Tobago | 72 | (3) |
- * Club domestic league appearances and goals as of 27 August 2008 ‡ National team caps and goals as of 13 August 2009

Keyeno Thomas (born 29 December 1977, in Point Fortin) is a Trinidadian former football player who last played for Joe Public.

His previous clubs included San Juan Jabloteh in Trinidad and Tobago and Colorado Rapids in the United States.

Thomas played many matches for the Trinidad and Tobago national football team.
