= Everton F.C. (Trinidad and Tobago) =

Everton
- Ground: Port of Spain
- League: Port of Spain Football League

Everton Football Club is a former football club from Port of Spain, Trinidad and Tobago.

== Honours ==
- Port of Spain Football League
  - Winners (3): 1930, 1931, 1932
- Trinidad and Tobago Cup
  - Winners (4): 1929, 1930, 1931, 1932
