= Rajesh Latchoo =

Trinidadian football coach

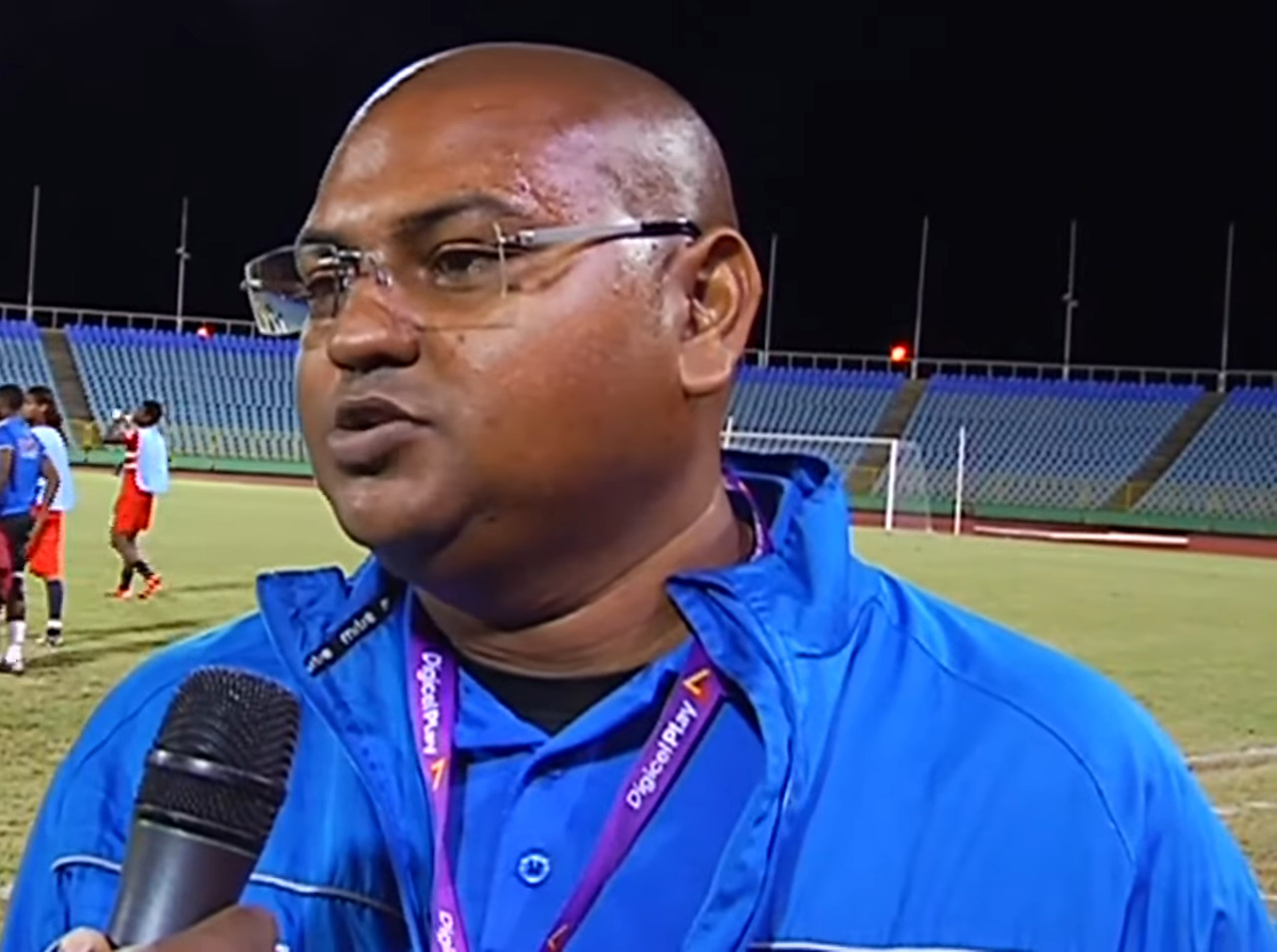
- Latchoo with Morvant Caledonia United in 2017

Personal information
- Full name: Rajesh Joseph Latchoo
- Date of birth: 8 June 1984 (age 42)
- Place of birth: Trinidad and Tobago
- Height: 5 ft 9 in (1.75 m)

Team information
- Current team: Saint Lucia (manager)

Managerial career
- Years: Team
- 2011: Joe Public
- Trinidad and Tobago U15 (women)
- Trinidad and Tobago U17 (women)
- 2016–2017: Morvant Caledonia United
- 2017–2022: Dominica
- 2022–2026: Trinidad and Tobago (academy)
- 2026–: Saint Lucia

Rajesh Joseph Latchoo (born 8 June 1984) is a Trinidadian football coach who is the current manager of the Saint Lucia national football team.

== Managerial career ==
In June 2011, Latchoo was appointed head coach of Joe Public at the age of 27.

Latchoo managed the Trinidad and Tobago women's national team at various youth levels.

In March 2017, following a 21 game spell at TT Pro League club Morvant Caledonia United, Latchoo was appointed manager of Dominica.

In September 2026, Latchoo would be hired by Saint Lucia to be their manager. They would lose to Barbados in his first game in charge before winning five straight games, qualifying for the 2027 CONCACAF Gold Cup, the first Gold Cup for the first time in the nation's history.

== Managerial statistics ==
As of match played 28 March 2023

Team	From	To	Record				
Team	From	To	G	W	D	L	Win %
Dominica	March 2017	June 2022	19	5	4	10	26.32
