= Palo Seco Velodrome =

Multi-use stadium in Palo Seco, Trinidad and Tobago

Coordinates: 10°5′3.97″N 61°36′5.38″W

- Interactive map of Palo Seco Velodrome
- Location: Palo Seco, Trinidad and Tobago
- Capacity: 10,000
- Surface: Grass

Tenant
- United Petrotrin

Palo Seco Velodrome is a multi-use stadium in Palo Seco, Trinidad and Tobago. It is currently used mostly for football matches and is the home stadium of United Petrotrin. The stadium holds 10,000 people.

It is the only major sporting facility in Siparia.
