= Lyndon Andrews =

Trinidad and Tobago footballer

Lyndon Andrews (born 20 January 1976) is a football midfielder from Trinidad and Tobago.

== International career ==
He earned 45 caps for the national team between 1996 and 2005.

== Clubs ==
- (Trinidad and Tobago) Superstar Rangers (1994–1996)
- (Trinidad and Tobago) Joe Public (1997–1999) 30 Lge apps (3 Goals)
- (Trinidad and Tobago) W Connection (1999–2000)
- (Scotland) Hibernian (2000–2002) 13 Lge apps
- (Trinidad and Tobago) W Connection (2002–2003)
- (Trinidad and Tobago) South Starworld Strikers (2004) (5 Goals)
- (Trinidad and Tobago) Joe Public (2005–2008) (4 Goals)
- (Trinidad and Tobago) Ma Pau SC (2009–2011) 41 lge apps (3 Goals)
