= Matthew Bartholomew =

Trinidad and Tobago footballer (born 1988)

Personal information
- Full name: Matthew Bartholomew
- Date of birth: 20 October 1988 (age 38)
- Place of birth: Trinidad and Tobago
- Height: 1.78 m (5 ft 10 in)
- Position: Striker

Team information
- Current team: Point Fortin

Senior career*
Years	Team	Apps	(Gls)
2005–2006	W Connection	28	(3)
2006–2008	White Star Woluwé F.C.	20	(5)
2008–2009	Ferencvárosi TC	0	(0)
2009–2013	W Connection	4	(0)
2013–	Point Fortin		

International career
2010–	Trinidad and Tobago	2	(0)
- * Club domestic league appearances and goals

Matthew Bartholomew (born 20 October 1988) is a Trinidad and Tobago football player, who currently plays for Point Fortin.
