= Dexter Skeene =

Trinidad and Tobago footballer (born 1964)

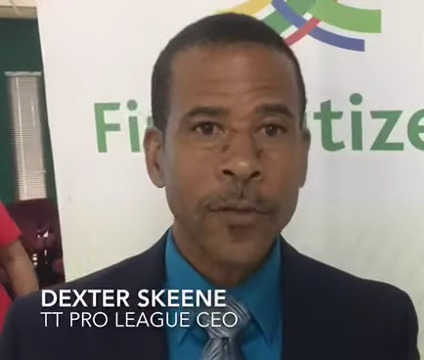
- Skeene in 2017

Personal information
- Full name: Dexter Hayden Skeene
- Date of birth: 1 April 1964 (age 62)
- Height: 1.73 m (5 ft 8 in)
- Position: Forward

Senior career*
Years	Team	Apps	(Gls)
- Malta Carib Alcons
- Maple Club

International career
1988–1991	Trinidad and Tobago	13	(4)

Managerial career
- 1996–1998: Trinidad and Tobago women
- * Club domestic league appearances and goals

Dexter Skeene (born 1 April 1964) is a Trinidadian former footballer who played as a forward for Malta Carib Alcons, Maple Club, and the Trinidad and Tobago national team. He is the CEO of the TT Pro League, having assumed the role of the country's highest level of league football on 1 April 2004.

== International career ==
Skeene made his debut for the Trinidad and Tobago national team in 1998, and scored his first international goal on 17 April 1988 in a 4–0 1990 FIFA World Cup qualification match win over Guyana. Skeene was a member of the Strike Squad that was named during the 1990 FIFA World Cup qualifying campaign. Skeene scored his second international goal in a 1–2 friendly loss to Canada on 2 October 1988 at Queen's Park Oval. He would conclude his international career with two goals in successive matches during the 1991 Caribbean Cup with the first in a 7–0 win over Dominican Republic and the second in a 2–1 loss to Saint Lucia. In all international competitions, Skeene finished with 13 international appearances for Trinidad and Tobago and scored 4 goals.

== Career statistics ==
Scores and results list Trinidad and Tobago's goal tally first.

#	Date	Venue	Opponent	Score	Result	Competition
1	17 April 1988	Camp Ayanganna, Providence, Guyana	Guyana	2–0	4–0	1989 CONCACAF Championship qualification
2	2 October 1988	Queen's Park Oval, Port of Spain, Trinidad and Tobago	Canada	1–0	1–2	Friendly
3	23 May 1991	National Stadium, Kingston, Jamaica	Dominican Republic	7–0	7–0	1991 Caribbean Cup
4	27 May 1991	National Stadium, Kingston, Jamaica	Saint Lucia	1–2	1–2	1991 Caribbean Cup
