= Ross Russell (footballer, born 1967) =

Trinidad and Tobago footballer

Personal information
- Full name: Ross Roy Russell
- Date of birth: 18 December 1967 (age 58)
- Position: Goalkeeper

Senior career*
Years	Team	Apps	(Gls)
1995–2001	Defence Force		

International career
1998–2001	Trinidad and Tobago	11	(0)

Managerial career
- 2009–2015: Defence Force
- 2015: Trinidad and Tobago women
- * Club domestic league appearances and goals

Ross Roy Russell (born 18 December 1967) is a Trinidadian retired football manager, and former footballer who played for Defence Force and the national team as a goalkeeper.

== Managerial career ==
After retiring as a footballer, Russell worked as a manager, returning to Defence Force from 2009 to 2015. He helped them win 2 TT Pro League. In 2015, he had a brief stint as the manager for the Trinidad and Tobago women's national football team. He was appointed president of the Northern Football Association, a league within the Trinidad and Tobago football league system.

== Personal life ==
Russell is the father of footballer Ross Russell Jr.
