= F.C. South End =

FC South End
- Full name: Football Club South End
- Nickname(s): FCS
- Founded: 2008
- Dissolved: 2011
- Ground: Manny Ramjohn Stadium; Marabella, Trinidad and Tobago
- Capacity: 10,000
- Owner: Anthony Rougier
- Manager: Dick Furlonge
- League: TT Pro League
- 2010–11: TT Pro League, 10th (relegated)

FC South End was a football team from Trinidad and Tobago based in Point Fortin/La Brea and is a former member of the TT Pro League, the highest level of football in Trinidad.

== History ==
Founded in 2008, it played its home games at the Manny Ramjohn Stadium.
