= United Petrotrin F.C. =

United Petrotrin
- Full name: United Petrotrin Football Club
- Nickname(s): The Oilmen
- Founded: 1992
- Dissolved: 2009
- Ground: Palo Seco Velodrome; Palo Seco, Trinidad and Tobago
- Capacity: 10,000
- Chairman: Ronald Brereton
- Manager: Marcos Tinoco
- League: TT Pro League
- 2009: TT Pro League, 7th (relegated)
- Website: petrotrin.com
Home colours

United Petrotrin Football Club was a football club from Trinidad and Tobago and a former member of the TT Pro League of Trinidad. It was dissolved in 2009.

== History ==
Formed in 1980, Trintoc entered the Point Fortin Football League that same year and immediately won the League title and then entered the fourth division of the Trinidad and Tobago Football Federation, which they also won in their first year. By the end of the decade Trintoc had won every title in local soccer (league champions in 1986 and 1988) and even became Caribbean champions in 1988 when they beat Seba United F.C. of Jamaica in the final.

During this period another oil-based team, Trintopec, also rose to prominence and in 1992, the T&T government decided to merge both companies, Trintoc and Trintopec to form Petrotrin. It was also decided to join both football squads and United Petrotrin was born. The team took up where Trintoc and Trintopec left off, winning several national championships, including two FA Trophy titles. However, soon after there was a change in the management of the company and funding for football was considerably reduced. As a result, United Petrotrin went into decline and the team was eventually disbanded. In an effort to revive football in the south, a group of concerned southerners formed the Southwest Institute of Football (SWIF), but the response from the business sector was poor. The Petrotrin chairman emerged as a saviour and with his support, United Petrotrin was reborn and the "oil squad" returned to top flight football.

United Petrotrin entered the Professional football league in 2005, as a combination of 2004 league participants South West Drillers and United Petrotrin of the Southern Football Association. They finished 6th in their debut season.

== Achievements ==
- CFU Club Championship: 1

1997

- Trinidad and Tobago Cup: 5

1986, 1988, 1993, 1995, 1997

- Professional Football League: 2

1986, 1988

== Performance in CONCACAF competitions ==
- CONCACAF Cup Winners Cup (1 appearance)
  - 1996 – Qualifying stage (Caribbean Zone)
