= Joe Public F.C. =

Association football club in Trinidad and Tobago

Joe Public
- Full name: B Mobile Joe Public Football Club
- Nicknames: Eastern Lions; Saints
- Founded: 1996; 30 years ago
- Dissolved: 2011; 15 years ago
- Ground: Marvin Lee Stadium; Tunapuna, Trinidad and Tobago
- Capacity: 6,000
- Chairman: Jack Warner
- Manager: Rajesh Latchoo
- League: National Super League
- 2010–11: TT Pro League, 3rd (relegated)
Home colours	Away colours

Joe Public Football Club was a football club from Trinidad and Tobago that used to play in the TT Pro League. Nicknamed the Eastern Lions, it was owned by former FIFA vice-president Jack Warner.

== History ==
Following the disappointment in 1996 of the Trinidad national team, which saw the country fail to qualify for World Cup 1998, Austin "Jack" Warner proposed that creating a league to produce home grown players would function as the building blocks to qualify for the next World Cup in Japan and South Korea. Thus, the need for a professional league and the ability for clubs to operate as business entities, the Joe Public Football Club was formed.

After entering and winning the Eastern Football Association's Competitions in 1996, Joe Public qualified for and won the Trinidad and Tobago Football Association's Champion of Champions Tournament. This allowed the club entry into the Semi-Professional Football League (SPFL) after only one season in existence. During the beginning years of the club's existence, Joe Public had established an operative football office with paid staff and employed several players from countries throughout the Caribbean, Nicaragua, Mexico and Brazil.

The club finished second in their first season of the SPFL in 1997, and in 1998 they won the Champions' League Tournament, the Craven A SPFL League title, and the CFU Caribbean Club Championship.

However, in 2004, Joe Public withdrew from the Professional Football League to play in the National Super League, Trinidad and Tobago's second division, but returned after two years for the 2006 season, in which they clinched the league championship title.

In November 2007, as a result going undefeated through the group stage of the CFU Club Championship 2007, Joe Public advanced to the knockout rounds after decisive wins over Sagicor South East United from Dominica 5–0, and SV Racing Club Aruba 7–0. In the quarterfinals they defeated Bassa F.C. from Antigua and Barbuda 4–0 and then in the semifinals, Joe Public upended the Puerto Rico Islanders 1–0 to advance to the final. On 16 November, Joe Public fell to Harbour View of Jamaica 1–2 to finish runner-up. However, due to the reorganized CONCACAF Champions' Cup into the CONCACAF Champions League, Joe Public qualified for the Champions League in August 2008.

=== 2008–09 CONCACAF Champions League ===
On 26 August 2008, Joe Public faced the New England Revolution, from the United States in the first leg of the preliminary round in the CONCACAF Champions League 2008–09. The Eastern Lions defeated New England Revolution 2–1 in front of a crowd of 2,100 at the Marvin Lee Stadium. Then, on the return leg before 3,523 spectators in Foxborough, Massachusetts, Public used a hat trick from Gregory Richardson in routing New England Revolution 4–0 in Gillette Stadium to advance to the group stage on a 6–1 aggregate score. With the result, Joe Public became the first Caribbean club to defeat a team from the United States in a CONCACAF club competition. In addition, Public were also the first to score as many as three goals against a club from the United States.

In the group stage, Joe Public were drawn with Atlante, Olimpia, and Montreal Impact. On 17 September 2008, Joe Public did not start the group stage on a positive note, falling 2–0 to Montreal Impact in Montreal. The Eastern Lions home opener for the CONCACAF Champions League did not go well either, as Joe Public lost 3–1 to C.D. Olimpia in the Marvin Lee Stadium giving the club no points from its first two games in the group stage. However, in their third game, Joe Public traveled to Cancun, Mexico and defeated Atlante 1–0. On 8 October, Joe Public lost another game in the group stage. This time they fell to Montreal Impact again 4–1, slashing the chances of Joe Public advancing beyond the group stage. With the loss to Atlante 2–0 in Cancún, Mexico on 21 October, Public was officially eliminated from the CONCACAF Champions League 2008–09. Finally, to finish the group stage, Public travelled to Tegucigalpa, Honduras to face Olimpia. They lost the match 4–0 to end their run in the CONCACAF Champions League with a record of 3–0–5 in the competition, with a disappointing 1–0–5 record in the group stage to finish at the bottom of their group.

Only two days after a loss to Montreal Impact in the CONCACAF Champions League, Joe Public needed a goal from Gregory Richardson in the 47th minute to defeat San Juan Jabloteh 1–0. With the win Joe Public advanced to the final of the First Citizens Cup. However, in the final, W Connection won a thrilling match, which saw Joe Public level the score 2–2 in the second half following a goal from Keyeno Thomas. But Public eventually lost the game on penalty kicks 6–5.

=== Closure ===
In 2011, Joe Public withdrew from TT Pro League due to issues arising from owner Jack Warner In 2014, the club withdrew from Super League due to financial reasons.

== Stadium ==
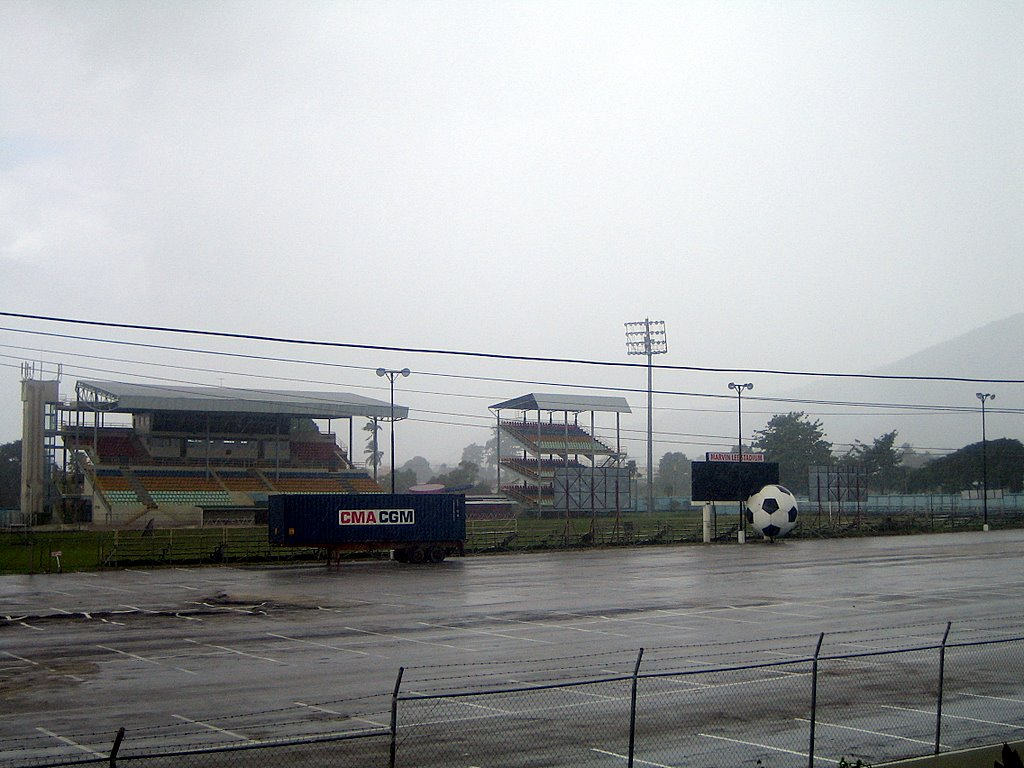
Marvin Lee Stadium

Joe Public played their home games at the 6,000-capacity Marvin Lee Stadium, located at the Dr. João Havelange Centre of Excellence in Tunapuna. The stadium was named after the national U-20 football captain, a standout defender at the time, who sustained head and neck injuries suffered in a collision with Landon Donovan in an U-20 game against the United States. He was left paralysed after the incident and died of illness as a result of his weakened state. Lee was later recognised by the Trinidad and Tobago government for his service to the nation and is remembered as a strong-willed individual who refused to let his injuries get the better of him.

In 2005, Warner proposed that Marvin Lee Stadium install an artificial playing surface, citing that it would bring more credibility for the region. Two years later, through a developmental grant from FIFA, Joe Public became the first Caribbean club to install an artificial playing surface, reportedly costing in excess of TT$8 million (US$600,000). The first game played on the newly installed playing surface saw Joe Public face Caledonia AIA in a TT Professional Football League match, which Caledonia AIA won 1–0.

== Team management ==
- Head coach: Derek King
- Asst coach: Ralph Nelson
- Asst coach: Richard Mitchell
- Team manager: Roland Sampath
- Trainer: David Prince
- Physiotherapist: David Cumberbatch
- Physiotherapist: Adisa Davis
- Equipment manager: Michael Williams

== Honours ==
Domestic

- TT Pro League: 3
  - 1998, 2006, 2009
- FA Trophy: 3
  - 2001, 2007, 2009
  - Runner-up (2): 1999, 2000
- First Citizens Cup: 0
  - Runner-up (2): 2008, 2009
- TOYOTA Classic: 1
  - 2007, 2009
  - Runner-up (1): 2005
- Digicel Pro Bowl: 1
  - 2009

Invitational

- Kashif & Shanghai Knockout Tournament: 1
  - 2007

International

- CFU Club Championship: 2
  - 1998, 2000
  - Runner-up (2): 2007, 2010

== Year-by-year ==
Season	League season		FA Trophy	First Citizens Cup	Digicel Pro Bowl	TOYOTA Classic	Lucozade Sport Goal Shield	CFU Club Championship	CONCACAF Champions League
Season	League result	Big Six	FA Trophy	First Citizens Cup	Digicel Pro Bowl	TOYOTA Classic	Lucozade Sport Goal Shield	CFU Club Championship	CONCACAF Champions League
1997	2nd		Unknown					did not qualify	
1998	Champions		Quarter-Finals					Champions	Quarter-Finals
1999	2nd		Final					Not Held	Quarter-Finals
2000	4th		Final	Semi-Finals				Champions	Quarter-Finals
2001	2nd		Champions	did not qualify	Semi-Finals			did not qualify	Not Held
2002	3rd		Quarter-Finals	Semi-Finals	Semi-Finals			did not qualify	
2003	5th		Quarter-Finals	Semi-Finals	Unknown			did not qualify	
2004	Withdrew^{†}	did not enter	Abandoned	did not enter				did not qualify	
2005	did not enter^{†}	did not enter	did not enter			Final		did not qualify	
2006	Champions	4th	Round of 16	Quarter-Finals	did not qualify	Quarter-Finals		did not qualify	
2007	2nd	3rd	Champions	Quarter-Finals	Quarter-Finals	Champions		Final	did not qualify
2008	5th	5th	Round of 16	Final	Quarter-Finals	Quarter-Finals		Not Held	did not qualify
2009	Champions	Winners	Champions	Final	Champions	Champions	Quarter-Finals	did not qualify	Group Stage
2010–11	3rd		Quarter-finals	Champions				Second Place	did not qualify
2011–12	did not enter								Did not qualify

^{†}Joe Public voluntarily spent the 2004 and 2005 seasons in the National Super League. The Eastern Lions won the National Super League title in both years.

== Continental record ==
- 1998 CFU Club Championship

Quarter-Finals v. (Barbados) Notre Dame – 4:0
Semi-Finals v. (Jamaica) Waterhouse – 3:1
Final v. (Trinidad and Tobago) Caledonia AIA Fire – 1:0

- 1998 CONCACAF Champions' Cup

Quarter-Finals v. (United States) D.C. United – 0:8

- 1999 CONCACAF Champions' Cup

Quarter-Finals v. (United States) Chicago Fire – 0:2

- 2000 CFU Club Championship

Group Stage v. (Dominica) Guinness Harlem Bombers – 2:0
Group Stage v. (Suriname) SV Robinhood – 5:0
Group Stage v. (Netherlands Antilles) RKV FC Sithoc – 7:0
Championship Group v. (Haiti) Carioca – 1:1
Championship Group v. (Jamaica) Harbour View – 1:1
Championship Group v. (Trinidad and Tobago) W Connection – 1:0

- 2000 CONCACAF Champions' Cup

Quarter-Finals v. (Mexico) Pachuca – 0:1

- Copa Finta Internacional (in Brazil)

Third place

- 2007 CFU Club Championship

Group Stage v. (Dominica) Sagicor South East United – 5:0
Group Stage v. SV Racing Club Aruba – 7:0
Quarter-Finals v. (Antigua and Barbuda) Bassa – 4:0
Semi-Finals v. Puerto Rico Islanders – 1:0
Final v. (Jamaica) Harbour View – 1:2

- 2008–09 CONCACAF Champions League

Preliminary Round v. (United States) New England Revolution – 2:1, 4:0 (Joe Public F.C. advances 6:1 on aggregate)
Group Stage v. (Canada) Montreal Impact – 0:2, 1:4
Group Stage v. (Honduras) Olimpia – 1:3, 0:4
Group Stage v. (Mexico) Atlante – 1:0, 0:2

- 2010 CFU Club Championship

First Round v. (Suriname) SV Leo Victor – 4:3
First Round v. (Saint Vincent and the Grenadines) Avenues United – 6:0
First Round v. (Bermuda) Devonshire Cougars – 8:2
Second Round v. (Suriname) Walking Boys – 5:0
Second Round v. (Saint Vincent and the Grenadines) Systems 3 – 3:1
Final Round v. (Trinidad and Tobago) San Juan Jabloteh – 1:0
Final Round v. Puerto Rico Islanders – 1:1
Final Round v. (Puerto Rico) Bayamón – 1:3

- 2010–11 CONCACAF Champions League

Preliminary Round v. (Costa Rica) Brujas – 2:2, 4:2 (Joe Public F.C. advances 6:4 on aggregate)
Group Stage v. (Guatemala) Municipal – 2:3, 1:1
Group Stage v. (Mexico) Santos – 2:5, 1:5
Group Stage v. (United States) Columbus Crew – 1:4, 0:3
