= San Juan Jabloteh F.C. =

San Juan Jabloteh
- Full name: San Juan Jabloteh Football Club
- Nickname: San Juan Kings
- Founded: 1974; 52 years ago
- Ground: Hasely Crawford Stadium; Mucurapo, Trinidad and Tobago
- Capacity: 23,000
- Chairman: Jerry Hospedales
- Manager: Keith Jeffrey
- League: TT Pro League
- 2025–26: TT Pro League, 6th
Home colours	Away colours

San Juan Jabloteh Football Club is a football club located in San Juan, Trinidad and Tobago that plays in the country's TT Pro League. The team plays its home games in Hasely Crawford Stadium in Mucurapo, Trinidad.

== History ==
=== Football ===
The club was founded in 1974, with the stated objective to "uplift the socio-economic and moral condition of the young people of San Juan and its environs." Upon the creation, by the Trinidad and Tobago Football Association, of a Semi-Professional League in 1994, San Juan Jabloteh converted itself from a youth organization into a professional football club. With the backing of CL Financial in 1996, the club significantly expanded its operations. From 1997 to 1999, the team finished fourth in the Semi-Professional League in three consecutive years.

Upon the creation of Trinidad and Tobago's first professional league in 1999, San Juan Jabloteh became one of the league's founding members. Since joining, the club has been the league's most successful club, winning the league championship in 2002, 2003–04, 2007 and 2008. San Juan Jabloteh have also represented the league in the CONCACAF Champions' Cup in 2004.

According to the team's website, "Through its name of the Club identified itself with one of the national birds of the country – the Oil or Devil Bird-which lives in the Aripo Caves. Originally, the French settlers called the Bird: Les Diables Oiseaux which were translated by the local settlers into Diablotin and finally Jabloteh."

In July 2012, the club chose to withdraw the senior team from the TT Pro League, having already ceased to work on youth football projects and chose to concentrate on their netball team.

=== Netball ===
Since 1990, San Juan Jabloteh F.C. has also operated a netball team. They initially played in the Port of Spain Netball League. Since 2009, they have played in the All Sectors Netball League. Their sponsors have included CLICO. In 2024, Jabloteh won the ASNL Championship Division league title.

== Managers ==
- (England) Terry Fenwick (2001–2003)
- (England) Steve Rutter (2004)
- (England) Terry Kinerr (2005–2011)

== Honours ==
Domestic

- TT Pro League: 4

2002, 2003–04, 2007, 2008

- FA Trophy: 2

1998, 2005

- First Citizens Cup: 2

2000, 2003
Runner-up (1): 2005

- Digicel Pro Bowl: 3

2003, 2005, 2006
Runner-up (1): 2001, 2004

- TOYOTA Classic: 1

2008
Runner-up (1): 2007, 2009

International

- CFU Club Championship: 1

Winner (1): ::2003

Runner-up (1): 2006
Third Place (1): 2009

== Year-by-year ==
Season	League Season		FA Trophy	First Citizens Cup	Digicel Pro Bowl	TOYOTA Classic	Lucozade Sport Goal Shield	CFU Club Championship	CONCACAF Champions League
Season	League Result	Big Six	FA Trophy	First Citizens Cup	Digicel Pro Bowl	TOYOTA Classic	Lucozade Sport Goal Shield	CFU Club Championship	CONCACAF Champions League
1997	4th	Started in 2004	Unknown	Started in 2000	Started in 2001	Started in 2005	Started in 2009	did not qualify	
1998	4th	Started in 2004	Champions	Started in 2000	Started in 2001	Started in 2005	Started in 2009	Quarter-Finals	did not qualify
1999	4th	Started in 2004	Unknown	Started in 2000	Started in 2001	Started in 2005	Started in 2009	Not Held	did not qualify
2000	3rd	Started in 2004	Semi-Finals	Champions	Started in 2001	Started in 2005	Started in 2009	did not qualify	
2001	5th	Started in 2004	Quarter-Finals	did not qualify	Final	Started in 2005	Started in 2009	did not qualify	Not Held
2002	Champions	Started in 2004	Semi-Finals	Semi-Finals	Quarter-Finals	Started in 2005	Started in 2009	did not qualify	
2003–04	Champions	Started in 2004	Round of 16	Champions	Champions	Started in 2005	Started in 2009	Champions	did not qualify
2004	3rd	Winners	Abandoned	Quarter-Finals	Final	Started in 2005	Started in 2009	Semi-Finals	Quarter-Finals
2005	2nd	6th	Champions	Final	Champions	Semi-Finals	Started in 2009	did not qualify	
2006	3rd	Winners	Quarter-Finals	Semi-Finals	Champions	Quarter-Finals	Started in 2009	Final	did not qualify
2007	Champions	4th	Semi-Finals	Third Place	Quarter-Finals	Final	Started in 2009	Fourth Place	did not qualify
2008	Champions	Winners	Quarter-Finals	Fourth Place	Quarter-Finals	Champions	Started in 2009	Not Held	did not qualify
2009	2nd	2nd	Round of 16	Semi-Finals	Quarter-Finals	Final	Semi-Finals	Third Place	did not qualify
2010	In progress	Ended in 2009						Third Place	Group Stage
2011		Ended in 2009							Preliminary

== International competition ==
- 1998 CFU Club Championship:

Quarter-Finals v. (France) Aiglon du Lamentin – 0:2

- 2003 CFU Club Championship

Semi-Finals v. (Jamaica) Arnett Gardens – 3:1, 1:3 (San Juan Jabloteh advances 6:2 on aggregate)
Final v. (Trinidad and Tobago) W Connection – 2:1, 2:1 (San Juan Jabloteh wins 4:2 on penalties)

- 2004 CONCACAF Champions' Cup

Quarter-Finals v. (United States) Chicago Fire – 5:2, 0:4 (Chicago Fire advances 6:5 on aggregate)

- 2004 CFU Club Championship

First Round v. (Suriname) Walking Boyz Company – 3:1, 0:0 (San Juan Jabloteh advances 3:1 on aggregate)
Semi-Finals v. (Jamaica) Tivoli Gardens – 1:1, 0:1 (Tivoli Gardens F.C. advances 2:1 on aggregate)

- 2006 CFU Club Championship

Group Stage v. (Antigua and Barbuda) SAP – 4:0
Group Stage v. (Aruba) SV Britannia – 8:0
Group Stage v. (United States Virgin Islands) New Vibes – 5:0
Semi-Finals v. (Haiti) Baltimore – 2:0
Final v. (Trinidad and Tobago) W Connection – 0:1

- 2007 CFU Club Championship

Group Stage v. (Netherlands Antilles) CSD Barber – 5:0
Group Stage v. (Aruba) SV Deportivo Nacional – 5:1
Quarter-Finals v. (Haiti) Baltimore – 1:0
Semi-Finals v. (Jamaica) Harbour View – 0:0 (Harbour View advances 10:9 on penalties)
3rd Place v. Puerto Rico Islanders – 0:1, 0:0 (Puerto Rico Islanders wins 1:0 on aggregate)

- 2009 CFU Club Championship

Second Round v. (Suriname) Inter Moengotapoe – 2:1, 3:1 (San Juan Jabloteh advances 5:2 on aggregate)
Semi-Finals v. (Trinidad and Tobago) W Connection – 1:2
3rd Place v. (Haiti) Tempête – 2:1

- 2009–10 CONCACAF Champions League

Preliminary Round v. (Panama) San Francisco F.C. – 0:2, 3:0 (San Juan Jabloteh advances 3:2 on aggregate)
Group Stage v. (Mexico) Deportivo Toluca – 0:1, 0:3
Group Stage v. (United States) D.C. United – 0:1, 1:5
Group Stage v. (Honduras) Marathón – 1:3, 2:4

- 2010 CFU Club Championship

Second Round v. (Guyana) Alpha United – 2:0
Second Round v. (Puerto Rico) River Plate – 1:0
Final Round v. (Trinidad and Tobago) Joe Public – 0:1
Final Round v. (Puerto Rico) Bayamón – 4:1
Final Round v. Puerto Rico Islanders – 0:1

- 2010–11 CONCACAF Champions League

Preliminary Round v. (Mexico) Santos – 0:1, 0:5 (Santos advances 6:0 on aggregate)

== Notable players ==
- Mauricio Montezuma
