= 2013 Trinidad and Tobago Charity Shield =

2013 Digicel Charity Shield
Defence Force	W Connection
2	4
- Date: 6 September 2013
- Venue: Hasely Crawford Stadium, Mucurapo, Trinidad
- Man of the Match: Hashim Arcia (W Connection)
- Referee: Neal Brizan
- Attendance: 125
- Weather: Scattered Clouds; 27 °C (81 °F)

The 2013 Trinidad and Tobago Charity Shield (known as the Digicel Charity Shield for sponsorship reasons) was the second edition of the Charity Shield, which is a football match that opened the 2013–14 Pro League season. The match was played on 6 September 2013, between the winners of the previous season's TT Pro League and Pro Bowl competitions. The match was a rematch of the inaugural Charity Shield contested by the 2013 Pro Bowl winners, W Connection, and the champions of the 2012–13 Pro League, Defence Force.

The Savonetta Boys secured the Charity Shield for the second consecutive year after defeating the Teteron Boys 4–2 at the Hasely Crawford Stadium. The match witnessed a goal spree in the second forty-five minutes after the two teams combined for six goals during the second-half. Hashim Arcia opened the scoring in the 46th minute before Richard Roy leveled for Defence Force two minutes later. However, a goal each from Silvio Spann and Stefano Rijssel secured the win for W Connection. After scoring in the 70th minute from a penalty kick, Arcia was awarded the Man of the Match for recording a brace.

== Pre-match ==
=== Entry ===
W Connection qualified by winning the 2013 Digicel Pro Bowl, defeating North East Stars 4–3 in a penalty shoot-out after the final match ended scoreless at Hasely Crawford Stadium. W Connection claimed victories over Caledonia AIA 3–1 and Defence Force 1–1 (4–3) en route to the final. The 2013 Pro Bowl was the Teteron Boys' third Pro Bowl title and consequently gained a berth in the 2013 Digicel Charity Shield.

Defence Force qualified for their first Charity Shield by clinching the TT Pro League title on 6 May 2013. After suffering from their largest defeat of the season at the hands of W Connection 4–0, the Teteron Boys claimed the title following a loss from second-placed Caledonia AIA to Central FC in Couva. Defence Force started their season off the pace set by Pro League newcomers Central FC with just one win from their first three matches. However, after recording four consecutive victories, the combined air and coast guard club climbed to level on points with Caledonia AIA following the first round of fixtures. Defence Force recorded an additional four consecutive wins that included an undefeated run of twelve matches to give the club a four-point lead after the second round. The club would never relinquish their lead and secured their second title in three seasons and marked their third Pro League title overall.

== Match ==
=== Details ===
6 September 2013
19:00 (UTC-4)

Defence Force	2–4	W Connection
Roy 58'; Welch 86'	Report	Arcia 46', 70' (pen.); Spann 53'; Rijssel 74'

Hasely Crawford Stadium
Mucurapo, Trinidad
Attendance: 125
Referee: Neal Brizan

Defence Force
W Connection

GK	25	(Trinidad and Tobago) Sheldon Clarke
LB	21	(Trinidad and Tobago) Aklie Edwards		(substituted off) 48'
CB	5	(Trinidad and Tobago) Devin Jordan
CB	20	(Trinidad and Tobago) Rodell Elcock	(yellow card) 69'	(substituted off) 79'
RB	14	(Trinidad and Tobago) Corey Rivers (c)
DM	18	(Trinidad and Tobago) Sean Narcis	(yellow card) 45+'	(substituted off) 62'
LM	17	(Trinidad and Tobago) Ross Russell Jr.	(yellow card) 24'	(substituted off) 79'
CM	15	(Trinidad and Tobago) Jerwyn Balthazar		(substituted off) 68'
CM	11	(Trinidad and Tobago) Kevon Carter
RM	16	(Trinidad and Tobago) Kerry Joseph
CF	9	(Trinidad and Tobago) Richard Roy		(substituted off) 79'
Substitutes:
GK	1	(Trinidad and Tobago) Kevin Graham
DF	2	(Trinidad and Tobago) Glynn Franklyn		(substituted on) 79'
DF	4	(Trinidad and Tobago) Marvin Jones		(substituted on) 48'
MF	12	(Trinidad and Tobago) Josimar Belgrave		(substituted on) 79'
MF	32	(Trinidad and Tobago) Samuel Delice		(substituted on) 62'
MF	81	(Trinidad and Tobago) Adrian Welch		(substituted on) 68'
FW	34	(Trinidad and Tobago) Kurtly Dodds		(substituted on) 79'
Manager:
(Trinidad and Tobago) Ross Russell

GK	21	(Colombia) Alejandro Figueroa	(substituted off) 79'
LB	2	(Saint Lucia) Kurt Frederick
CB	19	(Trinidad and Tobago) Leslie Joel Russell	(substituted off) 71'
CB	4	(Trinidad and Tobago) Daneil Cyrus
RB	24	(Brazil) João Ananias	(substituted off) 75'
LM	3	(Saint Kitts and Nevis) Gerard Williams
CM	6	(Brazil) Célio da Silva
CM	7	(Trinidad and Tobago) Silvio Spann (c)	(substituted off) 71'
RM	14	(Trinidad and Tobago) Hashim Arcia	(substituted off) 75'
FW	27	(Colombia) Yefer Lozano	(substituted off) 33'
FW	31	(Trinidad and Tobago) Jerrel Britto	(substituted off) 68'
Substitutes:
GK	18	(Saint Kitts and Nevis) Julani Archibald	(substituted on) 79'
DF	25	(Colombia) Christian Viveros	(substituted on) 71'
DF	39	(Trinidad and Tobago) Alvin Jones	(substituted on) 75'
MF	11	(Saint Lucia) Tremain Paul	(substituted on) 71'
MF	28	(Colombia) Yhon Reyes	(substituted on) 75'
FW	26	(Suriname) Stefano Rijssel	(substituted on) 33'
FW	65	(Trinidad and Tobago) Neil Benjamin	(substituted on) 68'
Manager:
(Saint Lucia) Stuart Charles-Fevrier

Man of the match

- Hashim Arcia (W Connection)

Match rules

- 90 minutes
- Penalty shoot-out if scores level after 90 minutes
- Seven named substitutes
- No maximum on number of substitutions

== See also ==
- 2012–13 TT Pro League
- 2013 Digicel Pro Bowl
