= 2012 Trinidad and Tobago Charity Shield =

2012 Digicel Charity Shield
| W Connection | Defence Force |
| 2 | 0 |
- Date: 8 September 2012
- Venue: Manny Ramjohn Stadium, Marabella, Trinidad
- Man of the Match: Joevin Jones (W Connection)
- Referee: Rodphin Harris
- Attendance: 200
- Weather: Sunny; 31 °C (88 °F)

The 2012 Trinidad and Tobago Charity Shield (known as the Digicel Charity Shield for sponsorship reasons) was the inaugural edition of the Charity Shield, which was a football match that opened the 2012–13 TT Pro League season. The match was played at Manny Ramjohn Stadium in Marabella on 8 September 2012, between the winners of the previous season's Pro League and Pro Bowl competitions. The match was contested by the 2012 Digicel Pro Bowl winners, Defence Force, and the champions of the 2011–12 Pro League, W Connection. The Savonetta Boys won the match 2–0 with goals from Shahdon Winchester and Joevin Jones, who was later named the Man of the Match.

The winners of the Charity Shield, W Connection received TT$10,000 donated to a charitable cause of choice. It was announced that the charitable cash prize would be given to the captain of W Connection, Jan-Michael Williams, to offset medical expenses for his fiancée Candice Worrell. Worrell was brutally assaulted while being relieved of her mobile phone in January 2012 and was comatose for nearly three months. Additionally, part proceeds generated from the gate receipts will also go towards introducing the "Read to Rise" Primary Literacy Program to a school within W Connection's community.

== Pre-match ==
=== Entry ===
Defence Force qualified by winning the 2012 Digicel Pro Bowl, beating Caledonia AIA 5–2 in the final at Hasely Crawford Stadium. Defence Force beat San Juan Jabloteh 6–0 and T&TEC 2–0 en route to the final. The 2012 victory was the Teteron Boys' first Pro Bowl triumph and consequently gained a berth in the 2012 Digicel Charity Shield.

W Connection qualified for the inaugural Charity Shield by clinching the TT Pro League title in the 2011–12 season. W Connection made a moderate start to the league season, having trailed T&TEC by seven points following the first round conclusion. However, a rise in form in December and January meant they rose to within one point behind leaders T&TEC after the Electricity Boys recorded just two wins from seven matches in the second round of fixtures. W Connection recorded a draw against T&TEC on 23 March to remain within two points of the leaders heading into the last match day. Needing just a draw from their last league match on 29 March to be crowned champions, T&TEC fell 3–2 to Caledonia AIA after W Connection defeated Police 8–1. The league being decided by a single point was the closest finish since Joe Public and W Connection in 2006 and ensured the Savonetta Boys their second TT Pro League title and fourth top-flight league title overall since 2000.

== Match ==
=== Details ===
8 September 2012
17:00 (UTC−4)

| W Connection | 2–0 | Defence Force |
|---|---|---|
| Winchester 19'; Jones 47' | Report |

Manny Ramjohn Stadium
Marabella, Trinidad
Attendance: 200
Referee: Rodphin Harris

W Connection
Defence Force

| GK | 18 | (Trinidad and Tobago) Jan-Michael Williams (c) |
| LB | 6 | (Trinidad and Tobago) Kemuel Rivers | (yellow card) 42' |
| CB | 5 | (Saint Lucia) Elijah Joseph |
| CB | 3 | (Trinidad and Tobago) Akeem Benjamin |
| RB | 13 | (Trinidad and Tobago) Kern Cupid |
| LM | 29 | (Trinidad and Tobago) Jomal Williams | | (substituted off) 75' |
| CM | 8 | (Trinidad and Tobago) Clyde Leon |
| CM | 36 | (Trinidad and Tobago) Joevin Jones |
| RM | 7 | (Trinidad and Tobago) Rennie Britto | | (substituted off) 73' |
| FW | 14 | (Trinidad and Tobago) Hashim Arcia | | (substituted off) 46' |
| FW | 40 | (Trinidad and Tobago) Shahdon Winchester |
Substitutes:
| GK | 22 | (Trinidad and Tobago) Aquelius Sylvester |
| DF | 4 | (Trinidad and Tobago) Daneil Cyrus |
| MF | 12 | (Saint Kitts and Nevis) Gerard Williams | | (substituted on) 75' |
| MF | 16 | (Trinidad and Tobago) Andre Quashie | | (substituted on) 73' |
| MF | 25 | (Colombia) Christian Viveros |
| FW | 17 | (Trinidad and Tobago) Andrei Pacheco | | (substituted on) 46' |
| FW | 31 | (Trinidad and Tobago) Jerrel Britto |
Manager:
(Saint Lucia) Stuart Charles-Fevrier

| GK | 1 | (Trinidad and Tobago) Kevin Graham |
| LB | 21 | (Trinidad and Tobago) Aklie Edwards |
| CB | 5 | (Trinidad and Tobago) Devin Jordan |
| CB | 20 | (Trinidad and Tobago) Rodell Elcock |
| RB | 14 | (Trinidad and Tobago) Corey Rivers (c) |
| DM | 8 | (Trinidad and Tobago) Curtis Gonzales | (red card) 14' |
| LM | 17 | (Trinidad and Tobago) Ross Russell Jr. | | (substituted off) 73' |
| CM | 15 | (Trinidad and Tobago) Jerwyn Balthazar | | (substituted off) 81' |
| CM | 11 | (Trinidad and Tobago) Kevon Carter |
| RM | 12 | (Trinidad and Tobago) Josimar Belgrave | | (substituted off) 53' |
| CF | 10 | (Trinidad and Tobago) Devorn Jorsling |
Substitutes:
| GK | 25 | (Trinidad and Tobago) Sheldon Clarke |
| DF | 3 | (Trinidad and Tobago) Keston Williams |
| DF | 4 | (Trinidad and Tobago) Marvin Jones |
| DF | 6 | (Trinidad and Tobago) Michael Edwards | | (substituted on) 73' |
| MF | 18 | (Trinidad and Tobago) Sean Narcis | | (substituted on) 81' |
| MF | 19 | (Trinidad and Tobago) Dexter Pacheco |
| FW | 9 | (Trinidad and Tobago) Richard Roy | | (substituted on) 53' |
Manager:
(Trinidad and Tobago) Ross Russell

Man of the match

- Joevin Jones (W Connection)

Match rules

- 90 minutes
- Penalty shoot-out if scores level after 90 minutes
- Seven named substitutes
- No maximum on number of substitutions

== See also ==
- 2011–12 TT Pro League
- 2012 Digicel Pro Bowl
