= Stefano Rijssel =

Surinamese footballer

Personal information
- Full name: Stefano Rodney Rijssel
- Date of birth: 26 March 1992 (age 34)
- Place of birth: Paramaribo, Suriname
- Height: 5 ft 10 in (1.78 m)
- Position: Forward

Senior career*
Years	Team	Apps	(Gls)
2009–2011	SV Leo Victor		
2011–2012	Inter Moengotapoe		
2012–2014	W Connection	16	(9)
2014–2018	Inter Moengotapoe		
2018–2019	S.V. Robinhood		
2020	Nieuw Utrecht		

International career^{‡}
2010–2011	Suriname U20		(7)
2011	Suriname U23		(2)
2010–2019	Suriname	36	(14)
- * Club domestic league appearances and goals ‡ National team caps and goals as of 14:09, 5 August 2019 (UTC)

Stefano Rijssel (born 26 March 1992) is a former Surinamese footballer.

== Club career ==
=== Semi-professional ===
Rijssel began his career with SV Leo Victor and Inter Moengotapoe, both of Suriname's Hoofdklasse. After being the league's top scorer with SV Leo Victor with 14 goals during the 2010–2011 season, in April 2011 Rijssel was offered a two-week trial with Belgium's Germinal Beerschot but ultimately was not signed by the club. It was reported that Rijssel made a favorable impression with the club, particularly with his ability to adapt to the difference in the level of play between the Suriname league and the Belgian league over the two-week period, but was unable to set himself apart from the attackers already on the roster, particularly considering the poor financial situation of the club at the time. Also in 2010–2011, Rijssel scored 4 goals in 3 matches for Leo Victor in the 2010 CFU Club Championship but that was not enough to help his club advance to the second round of the competition. After returning home from Belgium and playing a season for Inter Moengotapoe, Rijssel signed for W Connection on a 3-year contract in July 2012 after impressing the club at the 2012 CFU Club Championship with Inter. In this competition, Rijssel tallied 4 goals in the first round before being eliminated by Antigua Barracuda, Victory Sportif Club, and W Connection.

=== Professional ===
By signing for W Connection, Rijssel became the only fully professional footballer representing Suriname internationally at that time. During his first season with W Connection, Rijssel made two appearances against C.D. Guadalajara of Mexico and one appearance against Club Xelajú MC of Guatemala in the 2012–13 CONCACAF Champions League. During the 2013–14 CONCACAF Champions League, Rijssel made three appearances in the group stage including two against CD Árabe Unido of Panama and one against the Houston Dynamo of Major League Soccer. On 6 September 2013, Rijssel scored W Connection's fourth goal in a 4–2 victory over Defence Force F.C. in the 2013 Trinidad and Tobago Charity Shield, an annual match between the previous season's league winner and the winner of the Trinidad and Tobago Pro Bowl. After being out for months because of injury, Rijssel returned to league action on 7 December 2013 as a second-half substitute against Central FC. He marked his return with a 78th-minute strike, the game-winner in the 1–0 victory. In total, Rijssel amassed 16 league appearances for the Trinidadian club, scoring 9 goals and 1 goal international. Rijssel became the MVP of the 2014 Trinidad and Tobago Pro Bowl after scoring 2 goals in the final.

In December 2013, it was announced that Rijssel was one of 23 Caribbean players selected to participate in the 2014 Caribbean Combine, with hopes of participating in the 2014 MLS Combine and being selected in the 2014 MLS SuperDraft. Following the 3-day event, Rijssel was one of only two players selected to participate in the MLS Combine from 10 to 14 January in Fort Lauderdale, Florida, along with Quintón Christina of Curaçao, because of their "impressive play". During the combine, Rijssel started the match on Day 1 but was an unused substitute on Day 2 with representatives from the Columbus Crew and reigning champions Sporting Kansas City making contact with the player. Following the combine, Rijssel's performance was described as, "...showed plenty of mobility and enterprise. Yet can be erratic and out of control".

Rijssel was not drafted during rounds 1 and 2 of the first day of the draft. However, he was identified as one of the best players available going into the third and fourth rounds. On 21 January 2014, Rijssel was selected in the 3rd round, 55th overall, by Seattle Sounders FC becoming the first player from the Caribbean Combine to ever be drafted. After drafting Rijssel, Sounders' assistant coach and scout Kurt Schmid said, "he showed good tactical sense as well as physical qualities. He can play wide in midfield but also has some versatility". It was then reported that Rijssel would attend the opening of Seattle's training camp scheduled for four days after the draft but was still under contract with W Connection so a deal for a loan or purchase of the player would have to be negotiated. After Rijssel was drafted by Seattle, W Connection owner David John Williams told Caribbean media that Rijssel was allowed to go to Seattle for training before a deal for the player had been made. However, he stated that MLS officials had already contacted him to establish parameters for a transfer if Seattle decided to sign Rijssel and that an offer would be made after the two-week training camp was finished. Before departing for preseason camp in Arizona, Rijssel earned the fastest time for the 30-meter dash during club fitness tests. Following the club's return to Seattle, it was announced that Rijssel had been cut and was no longer with the team.

=== Return to Suriname ===
In August 2014, it was announced that Rijssel was transferred back to Inter Moengotapoe from W Connection for a record $20,000 USD. Rijssel stated that he had not felt comfortable with the Trinidadian club since his failed transfer to Seattle Sounders FC and that he felt W Connection was to blame.

In 2018 Rijssel was crowned the top scorer of the inaugural edition of the CONCACAF Caribbean Club Shield with six goals in four matches. Inter Moengotapoe won silver in the competition, being defeated by Club Franciscain of Martinique in the final. Rijssel missed the final due to injury.

In late August, Rijssel announced he would be moving to 2018 League champions S.V. Robinhood. Toward the end of the 2018–19 SVB Topklasse season, Rijssel was one of the top scorers in the league with 12 goals. He competed with the club in the 2019 Caribbean Club Shield. He scored four total goals, including a hattrick against Aruban club SV Dakota. The club went on to defeat Club Franciscain of Martinique in the final to win the championship. The team then went on to defeat Real Hope FA of Haiti in a play-off match to qualify for the preliminary round of the 2019 CONCACAF League. Rijssel earned the competition's topscorer award consecutively.

In July 2019 it was announced by Suriname national team head coach Dean Gorré that Rijssel had gone on trial with an unidentified club in Belgium while other sources reported he was actually on trial in the Netherlands. The player previously trialed in Belgium with Beerschot A.C. in 2011. The trial meant that Rijssel would miss Robinhood's CONCACAF League away fixture against AS Capoise in Haiti after earning a 0–0 draw at home in the first leg.

=== Netherlands ===
He eventually signed for Nieuw Utrecht of the Dutch Tweede Klasse in 2020.

== International career ==
Rijssel was a key figure in Suriname's qualification for the 2011 CONCACAF U-20 Championship held in Guatemala, scoring 7 goals in 5 matches. This was the first time that Suriname qualified for the tournament since the 1990 edition. His tally of 7 goals made him second top scorer in qualifying, only one behind the leader. However, Rijssel was held scoreless in losses against the United States and Panama in the final round of the tournament and Suriname failed to qualify for the 2011 FIFA U-20 World Cup. Rijssel made his first senior appearance for Suriname on 13 October 2010 in a 2–1 victory over the Netherlands Antilles national football team in the 2010 Caribbean Championship. His first goal came only two days later in 2–1 victory over Saint Lucia in the same tournament, scoring only 14 minutes into the match. Rijssel has worn the #9 on his national jersey, the number typically reserved for a player who is the team's pure goal scorer and target striker.

=== International goals ===
Scores and results list Surinames's goal tally first.

#	Date	Venue	Opponent	Score	Result	Competition
1.	15 October 2010	André Kamperveen Stadion, Paramaribo, Suriname	Saint Lucia	1–0	2–1	2010 Caribbean Championship qualification
2.	12 November 2010	Antigua Recreation Ground, St. John's, Antigua and Barbuda	Cuba	2–1	3–3	2010 Caribbean Championship qualification
3.	14 November 2010	Antigua Recreation Ground, St. John's, Antigua and Barbuda	Dominica	5–0	5–0	2010 Caribbean Championship qualification
4.	23 September 2011	André Kamperveen Stadion, Paramaribo, Suriname	Curaçao	1–0	2–0	Friendly
5.	5 September 2012	Stade Omnisports, Le Lamentin, Martinique	Montserrat	6–1	8–1	2012 Caribbean Championship qualification
6.	5 September 2012	Stade Omnisports, Le Lamentin, Martinique	Montserrat	7–1	8–1	2012 Caribbean Championship qualification
7.	7 September 2012	Stade Omnisports, Le Lamentin, Martinique	British Virgin Islands	1–0	4–0	2012 Caribbean Championship qualification
8.	7 September 2012	Stade Omnisports, Le Lamentin, Martinique	British Virgin Islands	4–0	4–0	2012 Caribbean Championship qualification
9.	29 March 2016	André Kamperveen Stadion, Paramaribo, Suriname	Guadeloupe	1–1	3–2	2017 Caribbean Cup qualification
10.	29 March 2016	André Kamperveen Stadion, Paramaribo, Suriname	Guadeloupe	2–2	3–2	2017 Caribbean Cup qualification
11.	14 October 2018	André Kamperveen Stadion, Paramaribo, Suriname	British Virgin Islands	1–0	5–0	2019–20 CONCACAF Nations League qualification
12.	14 October 2018	André Kamperveen Stadion, Paramaribo, Suriname	British Virgin Islands	4–0	5–0	2019–20 CONCACAF Nations League qualification
13.	16 March 2019	Ashraf Pierkhan Stadion, Nieuw Nickerie, Suriname	Guyana	1–0	3–1	Friendly
14.	23 March 2019	André Kamperveen Stadion, Paramaribo, Suriname	Saint Kitts and Nevis	1–0	2–0	2019–20 CONCACAF Nations League qualification

== Career statistics ==
=== Club ===
Club	Season	League	League			League Cup (Note: Includes appearances in the Trinidad and Tobago Classic)			Continental (Note: Includes appearances in the CONCACAF Champions League)			Total		
Club	Season	League	Apps	Goals	Assists	Apps	Goals	Assists	Apps	Goals	Assists	Apps	Goals	Assists
W Connection	2012–13	TT Pro League	13	5	-	0	0	0	3	1	0	16	6	-
W Connection	2013–14	TT Pro League	3	4	-	0	0	0	5	0	0	6	4	-
Career total			16	9	-	0	0	0	8	1	0	24	10	-
Last updated 22 January 2016

=== International ===
As of 23 March 2019.

Suriname national team
Year	Apps	Goals
2010	8	3
2011	8	1
2012	5	4
2013	0	0
2014	3	0
2015	2	0
2016	6	2
2017	0	0
2018	2	2
2019	2	2
Total	36	14

== Honours ==
Inter Moengotapoe

- Hoofdklasse: 2014–15, 2015–16; runner-up: 2011–12

W Connection

- TT Pro League: 2012
- Trinidad and Tobago Charity Shield: 2013
- Trinidad and Tobago Pro Bowl: 2014

SV Robinhood

- Caribbean Club Shield: 2019

individual

- SVB Topklasse Top Scorer: 2010–11
- Trinidad and Tobago Pro Bowl MVP: 2014
- CONCACAF Caribbean Club Shield Top Scorer: 2018, 2019
