= 2018 TT Pro League =

TT Pro League
- Season: 2018
- Champions: W Connection; 6th Pro League title
- 2020 Caribbean Club Championship: W Connection; Central
- Matches: 90
- Goals: 318 (3.53 per match)
- Top goalscorer: Marcus Joseph 18 goals
- Biggest home win: Defence Force 10–0 St. Ann's Rangers; 15 August 2018
- Biggest away win: North East Stars 0–8 Morvant Caledonia United; 28 September 2018
- Highest scoring: Defence Force 10–0 St. Ann's Rangers; 15 August 2018

The 2018 TT Pro League season was the 20th season of the TT Pro League, the Trinidad and Tobago professional league for association football clubs. A total of ten teams participated, with North East Stars being the defending champions from the 2017 season.

The 2018 football season kicked off with the Charity Shield between defending TT Pro League champions North East Stars and defending Trinidad and Tobago FA Trophy champions W Connection. League play officially started on 10 August 2018, and ended on the 7 December with the crowning of W Connection by one point over their Couva rivals Central. It was their first title since the 2013–14 season.

== Changes from the 2017 season ==
The following changes were made since the 2017 season:

== Teams ==
=== Team summaries ===
Location of the 2018 TT Pro League teams

Note: Flags indicate national team as has been defined under FIFA eligibility rules. Players may hold more than one non-FIFA nationality.

| Team | Location | Stadium | Capacity | Manager | Captain |
|---|---|---|---|---|---|
| Central | California | Ato Boldon Stadium | 10,000 | (Trinidad and Tobago) Stern John | (Trinidad and Tobago) Duane Muckette |
| Club Sando | San Fernando | Mahaica Oval Pavilion | 2,500 | (Trinidad and Tobago) Angus Eve | (Trinidad and Tobago) Jayson Joseph |
| Defence Force | Chaguaramas | Hasely Crawford Stadium | 27,000 | (Trinidad and Tobago) Marvin Gordon | (Trinidad and Tobago) Jerwyn Balthazar |
| Morvant Caledonia United | Morvant/Laventille | Park Street Recreational Ground | 3,000 | (Trinidad and Tobago) Jerry Moe | (Trinidad and Tobago) Kareem Joseph |
| North East Stars | Arima | Arima Velodrome | 5,000 | (Serbia) Zoran Vraneš | (Trinidad and Tobago) Sean John |
| Point Fortin Civic | Point Fortin | Mahaica Oval Pavilion | 2,500 | (Trinidad and Tobago) Reynold Carrington | (Trinidad and Tobago) Hughtun Hector |
| Police | Saint James | Manny Ramjohn Stadium | 10,000 | (Trinidad and Tobago) Richard Hood | (Trinidad and Tobago) Adrian Foncette |
| San Juan Jabloteh | San Juan | Barataria Oval | 1,000 | (Trinidad and Tobago) Keith Jeffrey | (Trinidad and Tobago) Elton John |
| St. Ann's Rangers | St. Ann's | Saint Augustine Secondary Grounds | 1,000 | (Trinidad and Tobago) Dave Quamina | (Trinidad and Tobago) Chadley David |
| W Connection | Point Lisas | Manny Ramjohn Stadium | 10,000 | (Saint Lucia) Stuart Charles-Fevrier | (Saint Kitts and Nevis) Gerard Williams |

== Stadiums Used ==
Since the teams do not play in their set home stadium, these are the stadiums that were used to host the matches throughout the season.

| Place | Stadium | No. of matches hosted |
|---|---|---|
| 1 | Ato Boldon Stadium | 41 |
| 2 | Hasely Crawford Stadium | 27 |
| 3 | Larry Gomes Stadium | 10 |
| 4 | Mahaica Oval, Point Fortin | 9 |
| 5 | Mannie Ramjohn Stadium | 2 |

== League table ==
| Pos | Team | Pld | W | D | L | GF | GA | GD | Pts |
|---|---|---|---|---|---|---|---|---|---|
| 1 | W Connection (C) | 18 | 10 | 7 | 1 | 43 | 8 | +35 | 37 |
| 2 | Central | 18 | 11 | 3 | 4 | 42 | 25 | +17 | 36 |
| 3 | Club Sando | 18 | 10 | 3 | 5 | 44 | 26 | +18 | 33 |
| 4 | Police | 18 | 10 | 3 | 5 | 37 | 21 | +16 | 33 |
| 5 | Defence Force | 18 | 9 | 3 | 6 | 38 | 21 | +17 | 30 |
| 6 | Morvant Caledonia United | 18 | 8 | 6 | 4 | 36 | 22 | +14 | 30 |
| 7 | San Juan Jabloteh | 18 | 8 | 3 | 7 | 29 | 24 | +5 | 27 |
| 8 | Point Fortin Civic | 18 | 3 | 2 | 13 | 20 | 46 | −26 | 11 |
| 9 | St. Ann's Rangers | 18 | 3 | 1 | 14 | 13 | 67 | −54 | 10 |
| 10 | North East Stars | 18 | 1 | 3 | 14 | 16 | 58 | −42 | 6 |

Updated to match(es) played on 7 December 2018. Source: TT Pro League
Rules for classification: 1) points; 2) goal difference; 3) number of goals scored.
(C) Champions

=== Positions by round ===
| Leader |
| 2020 Caribbean Club Championship First round |

The table lists the positions of teams after each week of matches. In order to preserve chronological evolvements, any postponed matches are not included to the round at which they were originally scheduled, but added to the full round they were played immediately afterwards. For example, if a match is scheduled for the tenth round of matches, but then postponed and played between rounds 16 and 17, it will be added to the standings for round 16.

| Team ╲ Round | 1 | 2 | 3 | 4 | 5 | 6 | 7 | 8 | 9 | 10 | 11 | 12 | 13 | 14 | 15 | 16 | 17 | 18 |
|---|---|---|---|---|---|---|---|---|---|---|---|---|---|---|---|---|---|---|
| W Connection | 1 | 2 | 1 | | | | | | | | | | | | | | | |
| Defence Force | 3 | 1 | 2 | | | | | | | | | | | | | | | |
| Club Sando | 4 | 4 | 3 | | | | | | | | | | | | | | | |
| San Juan Jabloteh | 6 | 5 | 4 | | | | | | | | | | | | | | | |
| Central | 2 | 3 | | | | | | | | | | | | | | | | |
| Point Fortin Civic | 5 | 6 | | | | | | | | | | | | | | | | |
| Morvant Caledonia United | 7 | 7 | | | | | | | | | | | | | | | | |
| North East Stars | 9 | 8 | | | | | | | | | | | | | | | | |
| St. Ann's Rangers | 10 | 10 | | | | | | | | | | | | | | | | |
| Police | 8 | 9 | 10 | | | | | | | | | | | | | | | |

Updated to match(es) played on 22 August 2018. Source: TT Pro League

== Results ==
Matches 1–18
| Home \ Away | CEN | CSA | DFO | MCU | NES | PFC | POL | SJJ | SAR | WCO |
|---|---|---|---|---|---|---|---|---|---|---|
| Central | | 2–2 | 2–1 | 3–1 | 6–1 | 4–0 | 1–0 | 0–3 | 4–2 | 1–6 |
| Club Sando | 1–1 | | 1–0 | 5–3 | 5–4 | 4–1 | 2–1 | 3–2 | 8–0 | 1–1 |
| Defence Force | 0–1 | 1–0 | | 4–3 | 1–1 | 3–1 | 2–3 | 3–0 | 10–0 | 1–2 |
| Morvant Caledonia United | 2–1 | 3–0 | 0–0 | | 0–0 | 2–1 | 1–2 | 1–1 | 2–0 | 0–0 |
| North East Stars | 0–2 | 2–6 | 1–4 | 0–8 | | 1–3 | 1–5 | 0–1 | 0–1 | 1–1 |
| Point Fortin Civic | 0–3 | 0–1 | 1–2 | 2–2 | 4–1 | | 1–3 | 0–2 | 4–2 | 1–3 |
| Police | 3–0 | 2–0 | 4–0 | 1–1 | 3–1 | 4–1 | | 1–2 | 2–2 | 0–0 |
| San Juan Jabloteh | 2–4 | 1–0 | 0–2 | 2–3 | 1–2 | 0–0 | 2–0 | | 5–0 | 1–1 |
| St. Ann's Rangers | 1–7 | 0–5 | 1–4 | 0–3 | 3–0 (Note: In the St. Ann's Rangers v North East Stars game, Rangers were awarded a 3–0 default victory.) | 1–0 | 0–3 | 0–3 (Note: In the St. Ann's Rangers v San Juan Jabloteh game, Jabloteh were awarded a 3–0 default victory.) | | 0–4 |
| W Connection | 0–0 | 2–0 | 0–0 | 0–1 | 4–0 | 8–0 | 4–0 | 4–1 | 3–0 | |

Updated to match(es) played on 7 December 2018. Source: TT Pro League
Legend: Blue = home team win; Yellow = draw; Red = away team win.

== Season statistics ==
=== Top scorers ===
| Rank | Player | Club | Goals |
|---|---|---|---|
| 1 | (Trinidad and Tobago) Marcus Joseph | W Connection | 18 |
| 2 | (Trinidad and Tobago) Tyrone Charles | Club Sando | 16 |
| 3 | (Trinidad and Tobago) Kareem Freitas | Police | 15 |
| 4 | (Trinidad and Tobago) Akim Armstrong | Central | 14 |
| 5 | (Guyana) Sheldon Holder | Morvant Caledonia United | 9 |
| 6 | (Trinidad and Tobago) Shackeil Henry | Club Sando | 8 |
| 6 | (Trinidad and Tobago) Devorn Jorsling | Defence Force | 8 |
| 6 | (Trinidad and Tobago) Jomoul Francois | San Juan Jabloteh | 8 |
| 9 | (Trinidad and Tobago) Duane Muckette | Central | 7 |
| 9 | (Trinidad and Tobago) Jameel Perry | Police | 7 |
