= Shahdon Winchester =

Trinidadian footballer (1992–2019)

Personal information
- Full name: Shahdon Shane Andre Winchester
- Date of birth: 8 January 1992
- Place of birth: Princes Town, Trinidad and Tobago
- Date of death: 19 December 2019 (aged 27)
- Place of death: Gasparillo, Trinidad and Tobago
- Height: 1.72 m (5 ft 8 in)
- Positions: Winger; forward

Youth career
- 2000–2009: W Connection
- 2004–2009: Naparima College

Senior career*
Years	Team	Apps	(Gls)
2009–2016	W Connection	64	(34)
2012	→ Sông Lam Nghệ An (loan)	0	(0)
2013	→ FF Jaro (loan)	24	(8)
2014	→ FF Jaro (loan)	30	(9)
2016–2018	Murciélagos	28	(5)
2018	→ Kapaz (loan)	8	(0)
2018	SJK	11	(1)
Total		165	(57)

International career
2008–2009	Trinidad and Tobago U17	8	(2)
2010–2011	Trinidad and Tobago U20	5	(3)
2011–2012	Trinidad and Tobago U23	4	(3)
2010–2019	Trinidad and Tobago	27	(6)
- * Club domestic league appearances and goals

Shahdon Shane Andre Winchester (8 January 1992 – 19 December 2019) was a Trinidadian professional footballer who played as a winger for the Trinidad and Tobago national team.

Winchester began his professional football career in 2009, at the age of 17, with W Connection in his native Trinidad and Tobago. During his time with the Savonetta Boys, Winchester won the TT Pro League title in 2011–12. In the middle of his third season with W Connection, in 2012, he was loaned to Vietnamese club Sông Lam Nghệ An, however never made an appearance for the club due to late arrival of his international clearance. He later moved to FF Jaro on loan for the 2013 and 2014 Veikkausliiga seasons. After returning to Trinidad and Tobago, Winchester signed a year later with Mexican club Murciélagos in 2016.

He was a Trinidad and Tobago international having made his debut in June 2010. Winchester participated in one minor tournament after representing the Soca Warriors in the 2011 Pan American Games. He scored his first international goal on 19 March 2016 in a friendly win over Grenada. Winchester recorded a hat-trick in the fifth place play-off against Haiti a year later during qualification for the 2017 CONCACAF Gold Cup.

== Early life ==
Winchester was born on 8 January 1992 in Princes Town, Trinidad and Tobago, to parents Derek and Svetlana. Shahdon attributed his early interest in football to his father as the two attended numerous local matches, which nurtured his love for the sport. At the age of 8, his father enrolled Winchester in local TT Pro League club W Connection's youth program. Two years later, Winchester lost his father in a vehicle accident. However, Shahdon later explained that the event helped him develop a deeper motivation to pursue a professional football career. After her husband's death, Svetlana made it her responsibility to ensure that Shahdon was not denied the opportunity to pursue his football dreams. In fact, she decided to take driving classes and apply for a permit to be able to drive Shahdon to youth practice in Couva.

At the age of 12, Winchester made his debut for Naparima College in San Fernando, Trinidad. In his five years with Naps, Shahdon led the team to the Secondary Schools Football League (SSFL) South Zone title on four occasions, including the national Intercol Big Five crown in 2007. He was named among the top five best league players in each of his final two years at Naps, which included a league-leading 16 goals in 2008. Winchester subsequently received the individual award for Best Forward of the Year.

== Club career ==
=== W Connection ===
==== Development and breakthrough (2009–2012) ====
After spending several seasons in the club's youth program, Winchester made his professional football debut in 2009, at the age of 17, for W Connection of the TT Pro League. Shahdon went on to score four goals in seven league appearances for the Savonetta Boys. However, the highlight of his first professional season occurred when he appeared for W Connection during the group stage of the 2009–10 CONCACAF Champions League against Real España.

Shahdon is a fantastic young talent, a real little star[...] If I had to make a comparison, I'd say Shahdon is like Dwight Yorke. He's got a lot of the same attributes. He runs at people, is super-strong, and loves scoring goals.

— Russell Latapy on Winchester during his two-week trial with Celtic in September 2010.

The following season, his goal-scoring form continued with a further five goals in ten appearances, prompting his debut for the Soca Warriors and trials from several clubs abroad. In particular, during a trial in Scotland with Celtic, 18-year-old Winchester scored two goals in a developmental match against a Motherwell XI on 14 September 2010. However, terms ultimately could not be agreed upon. He had further trials at Braga and FC Sevastopol in 2009 and 2010, respectively, followed by trials at FC Dallas and Colorado Rapids of Major League Soccer in 2011.

In January 2012, Winchester went on a two-month loan to Sông Lam Nghệ An of V.League 1. However, his international clearance arrived after the transfer window had closed and was unable to make an appearance for the Vietnamese club. Afterwards, Shahdon returned to Trinidad and Tobago to lead W Connection to the club's fourth Pro League championship finishing the 2011–12 season with three goals. In March 2012, he provided two goals for W Connection en route to finishing runners-up in the 2012 CFU Club Championship and secure qualification for the Savonetta Boys in the 2012–13 CONCACAF Champions League. Following the season, Winchester had an unsuccessful one-week trial in Norway with FK Haugesund of the Tippeligaen.

Shahdon opened the 2012–13 season as a starter for W Connection and made three consecutive appearances during the club's Champions League campaign. He later scored seven goals in as many matches in the Pro League, including his first career hat-trick as a professional on 5 January 2013 against Central FC. A week later, Shahdon flew to Jakobstad for a trial with Finnish club FF Jaro of the Veikkausliiga after agreeing to personal terms.

==== Loan moves to FF Jaro (2013–2014) ====
On 25 January 2013, Winchester agreed to join FF Jaro of the Veikkausliiga on a one-year loan following a successful two-week trial. One week later, he scored a seventh-minute goal in his debut for Jaro during a league cup match against VPS. On 20 February, he provided his second goal in three league cup matches with a penalty kick in a win over RoPS. However, after making seven consecutive appearances in the league cup, Winchester underwent surgery on 13 March for an injury to his Achilles tendon.

On 5 May 2013, Winchester made his league debut for FF Jaro against HJK after coming on for Markus Kronholm in the 62nd minute. After five consecutive league appearances, including three as a substitute, Winchester scored his first league goal in a 2–1 win over FC Lahti on 23 May. He scored two more goals in the next three league matches against TPS on 26 May and a week later against RoPS. Winchester later scored in consecutive matches against MYPA and FC Honka on 27 and 30 June. On 27 July, he recorded a brace in front of Jakobstad's second largest crowd for a football match in a 2–1 derby win over VPS. However, a string of illnesses and injuries kept him sidelined for Jaro's final six matches. Prior to his return to Trinidad and Tobago in October 2013, Winchester agreed to a one-year contract extension with Jaro through the end of the 2014 Veikkausliiga season. In his first season in Finland, Winchester recorded eight goals in the Veikkausliiga and ten goals in all competitions.

Following his loan to FF Jaro, Winchester returned to parent club, W Connection, for three months before his second loan to the Finnish club. In his short return with the Savonetta Boys, Winchester appeared in nine Pro League matches and scored five goals. On 21 January 2014, he scored a double over rivals San Juan Jabloteh, which was followed four days later with another goal against North East Stars. Before again departing for Finland, Winchester scored a further brace on 8 March against St. Ann's Rangers to extend W Connection's league lead to eight points en route to the club winning its fifth Pro League title.

On 19 March 2014, Winchester rejoined FF Jaro on another one-year loan for the 2014 Veikkausliiga season. Two weeks later, he made his return league debut for the club having started as a winger in a 1–0 loss to HJK on 6 April. Shahdon scored his first goal of the season in brilliant fashion against KuPS in the 15th minute on 19 April, before receiving a yellow card for diving in the penalty area shortly before half-time. In May 2014, Winchester was named in the Veikkausliiga team of the month after scoring three goals in as many league matches against TPS, SJK, and RoPS, respectively, to lead Jaro to third in the league table. The following month, Shahdon continued his scoring form with goals in consecutive matches against IFK Mariehamn on 15 June and three days later in a draw to MYPA. However, he received his fourth yellow card of the season in the 90th minute and was unable to feature for Jaro in the club's match against FC Lahti. Through the first half of the season, Winchester was the league's joint-leading goalscorer with Petteri Forsell, Macoumba Kandji, Roni Porokara, and Luis Solignac – having scored 6 league goals.

On 20 July 2014, Winchester scored his seventh goal of the season in the 63rd minute during a 5–0 win over FC Honka. At the conclusion of the season, Winchester finished tied for the eighth top goalscorer in the Veikkausliiga with nine league goals and was subsequently offered a new contract with Jaro.

==== Return to the Savonetta Boys (2015–2016) ====
After returning to W Connection following his loan to FF Jaro for the 2014 Veikkausliiga, Winchester was reportedly close to reaching an agreement with FK Vojvodina of the Serbian SuperLiga. However, with FIFPro advising its players to not agree contracts with Serbian clubs due to a high risk that players would not be paid their salaries, Shahdon ultimately did not sign with the club. In late-February 2015, Winchester was invited for a trial with the Chicago Fire of Major League Soccer during the team's preseason participation in the Simple™ Invitational Tournament in Portland. During his second match, Shahdon supplied the game-tying goal in the 90th minute after receiving a pass 40 yards from goal, sprinted towards Vancouver's back line, and powered a shot to the lower right corner from the top of the penalty area. In a media conference call following the match, Fire manager Frank Yallop expressed his desire to sign Winchester, but the club was unable to offer a contract with 25 players already on roster. Shahdon soon returned to help lead the Savonetta Boys to a runners-up finish with three goals in four matches during the 2015 CFU Club Championship and qualify for the following season's Champions League.

Winchester started the 2015–16 season with W Connection, changed from the number 16 jersey in favour of number 9, and was named a vice-captain. In the 2015–16 CONCACAF Champions League, he made two appearances against Santos Laguna and Saprissa during W Connection's group stage matches. Afterwards, Winchester provided four goals during the First Citizens Cup and TOYOTA Classic en route to W Connection claiming both crowns. In Pro League competition, Winchester scored a further seven goals during the first half of the season — tying his most Pro League goals in a season. On 24 February 2016, Winchester received his first career red card and an automatic two match suspension for retaliation following a punch from Atlántico FC's Mateo Zazo during the Savonetta Boys' CFU Club Championship opening match. Shahdon returned to score a goal against Arnett Gardens in the semifinals to help W Connection qualify for its second consecutive Champions League. However, he received another red card for a reckless challenge in the first half of a 3–0 loss to Couva rivals Central FC in the final.

=== Murciélagos ===
On 22 June 2016, Winchester signed along with former W Connection and international teammate Jomal Williams with Mexican club Murciélagos of Ascenso MX prior to the start of the 2016 Apertura for an undisclosed transfer.

=== Kapaz (loan) ===
On 8 February 2018, Winchester signed for Kapaz PFK on loan from Murciélagos F.C. until the end of the 2017/18 season.

=== SJK ===
After his Murciélagos' contract expired in July 2018, Winchester was unveiled as a new signing for SJK on 26 July 2018. SJK announced that Winchester had left the club on 30 November 2018.

== International career ==
Winchester represented Trinidad and Tobago on various levels of international competition, having been capped for the under-17, under-20, under-23 Olympic team, and the Trinidad and Tobago national teams.

=== Youth teams ===
He began his international career for the under-17 team during the Soca Warriors' runners-up finish in the 2008 CFU Youth Cup. During the competition, Winchester made five appearances and scored a pair of goals against Aruba. In April 2009, Winchester made three starts during the 2009 CONCACAF U-17 Championship, which witnessed the team eliminated without scoring a goal.

In November 2010, Winchester scored three goals in four matches to lead the under-20 team through qualification for the 2011 CONCACAF U-20 Championship. However, he made two substitute appearances in another early exit from a continental tournament after a goalless draw to Cuba and a 5–0 loss to Mexico. Although Trinidad and Tobago did not qualify for the 2011 FIFA U-20 World Cup, the Soca Warriors participated in the Pan American Games in October 2011. Winchester scored a goal in his only appearance of the competition for the under-23 team against Uruguay. He scored two more goals over his next three matches during the under-23 team's unsuccessful qualification attempt for the 2012 Summer Olympics in London.

==== Transition to the senior team (2010–2015) ====
Winchester made his full international debut for the national team on 21 June 2010 against Antigua and Barbuda at the age of 18. He was later called up for three qualification matches for the 2010 Caribbean Cup, but only featured in a 4–0 win over Haiti. Shahdon did not receive a call-up with the national team again until June 2013, when he came on as a substitute in the Soca Warriors' friendly defeat away to Romania 4–0.

In November 2014, Winchester received a call-up with the Soca Warriors during the 2014 Caribbean Cup in Montego Bay, Jamaica. In their final group stage match against Cuba, Winchester made a start as forward to earn his fourth national team cap during a scoreless draw. His next two appearances occurred in friendlies against Curaçao and Jordan in the lead-up to being named in the 35-man provisional roster for the 2015 CONCACAF Gold Cup. However, two weeks later, Soca Warrior manager Stephen Hart did not name Winchester to the final 23-man roster for the continental tournament in the United States.

==== First international goal (2016–2019) ====
Following an injury to Keron Cummings in a December 2015 training camp, Winchester was named as a replacement to the Trinidad and Tobago roster for the Copa América Centenario qualifying playoff against Haiti. On 8 January 2016, Shahdon came on as a 57th-minute substitute for Jonathan Glenn in a 1–0 loss to Haiti in Panama City, which saw the Soca Warriors fail to qualify for Copa América Centenario. Winchester later scored his first international goal on 19 March versus Grenada in a friendly match in St. George's. Two months later, he made an additional three appearances for the Soca Warriors, including two starts as striker, against Uruguay and China.

== Death ==
Winchester was one of four people killed in a traffic collision on 19 December 2019, when the car they were travelling in hit and crashed into a utility pole in Gasparillo, catching on fire. Everyone inside the car was killed.

== Career statistics ==
=== Club ===
Appearances and goals by club, season and competition
Club	Season	League			National cup		League cup (Note: Includes appearances in the Trinidad and Tobago's Classic, Goal Shield, and Pro Bowl)		Continental (Note: Includes appearances in the CONCACAF Champions League)		Other (Note: Includes appearances in the Trinidad and Tobago Charity Shield and CFU Club Championship)		Total	
Club	Season	Division	Apps	Goals	Apps	Goals	Apps	Goals	Apps	Goals	Apps	Goals	Apps	Goals
W Connection	2009	TT Pro League	7	4	5	0	1	0	1	0	0	0	14	4
W Connection	2010–11	TT Pro League	10	5	1	0	4	0	0	0	0	0	15	5
W Connection	2011–12	TT Pro League	7	3	4	0	6	4	0	0	5	2	22	9
W Connection	2012–13	TT Pro League	8	7	1	1	5	2	3	0	1	1	18	11
W Connection	2013–14	TT Pro League	9	5	0	0	0	0	0	0	0	0	9	5
W Connection	2014–15	TT Pro League	3	1	1	0	2	1	0	0	4	3	10	5
W Connection	2015–16	TT Pro League	20	9	0	0	10	6	2	0	3	1	35	16
W Connection	Total		64	34	12	1	28	13	6	0	13	7	123	55
Sông Lam Nghệ An (loan)	2012	V.League 1	0	0	0	0	0	0	0	0	0	0	0	0
FF Jaro (loan)	2013	Veikkausliiga	24	8	0	0	7	2	0	0	0	0	31	10
FF Jaro (loan)	2014	Veikkausliiga	30	9	0	0	0	0	0	0	0	0	30	9
FF Jaro (loan)	Total		54	17	0	0	7	2	0	0	0	0	61	19
Murciélagos	2016–17	Ascenso MX	21	4	3	0			0	0	0	0	24	4
Murciélagos	2017–18	Ascenso MX	7	1	0	0			0	0	0	0	7	1
Murciélagos	Total		28	5	3	0			0	0	0	0	31	5
Kapaz	2017–18	Azerbaijan Premier League	8	0	0	0			0	0	0	0	8	0
SJK	2018	Veikkausliiga	11	1	0	0			0	0	0	0	11	1
Career total			165	57	15	1	35	15	6	0	13	7	234	80

=== International ===
Appearances and goals by national team and year
National team	Year	Friendly		Competitive		Total	
National team	Year	Apps	Goals	Apps	Goals	Apps	Goals
Trinidad and Tobago	2010	1	0	1	0	2	0
Trinidad and Tobago	2011	0	0	0	0	0	0
Trinidad and Tobago	2012	0	0	0	0	0	0
Trinidad and Tobago	2013	1	0	0	0	1	0
Trinidad and Tobago	2014	0	0	1	0	1	0
Trinidad and Tobago	2015	2	0	0	0	2	0
Trinidad and Tobago	2016	5	1	4	0	9	1
Trinidad and Tobago	2017	2	1	6	4	8	5
Trinidad and Tobago	2018	0	0	2	0	2	0
Trinidad and Tobago	2019	1	0	1	0	2	0
Total		12	2	15	4	27	6

Scores and results list Trinidad and Tobago's goal tally first, score column indicates score after each Winchester goal.

List of international goals scored by Shahdon Winchester
No.	Date	Venue	Cap	Opponent	Score	Result	Competition
1	19 March 2016	Grenada National Stadium, St. George's, Grenada	8	Grenada	1–0	2–2	Friendly
2	8 January 2017	Ato Boldon Stadium, Couva, Trinidad and Tobago	17	Haiti	1–0	3–4	2017 CONCACAF Gold Cup qualification
3	8 January 2017	Ato Boldon Stadium, Couva, Trinidad and Tobago	17	Haiti	2–1	3–4	2017 CONCACAF Gold Cup qualification
4	8 January 2017	Ato Boldon Stadium, Couva, Trinidad and Tobago	17	Haiti	3–3	3–4	2017 CONCACAF Gold Cup qualification
5	6 October 2017	Estadio Alfonso Lastras, San Luis Potosí City, Mexico	21	Mexico	1–0	1–3	2018 FIFA World Cup qualification
6	14 November 2017	Ato Boldon Stadium, Couva, Trinidad and Tobago	23	Guyana	1–1	1–1	Friendly

== Honours ==
W Connection

- TT Pro League: 2011–12
- Digicel Charity Shield: 2012
- First Citizens Cup: 2015
- TOYOTA Classic: 2011, 2015
- Lucozade Sport Goal Shield: 2009

FF Jaro

- Veikkausliiga Team of the Month: May 2014

Individual

- Man of the Match: 2011 TOYOTA Classic
