= 2018 Trinidad and Tobago Charity Shield =

2018 Digicel Charity Shield
North East Stars	W Connection
1	7
- Date: 1 June 2018
- Venue: Hasely Crawford Stadium, Couva, Trinidad
- Referee: Rodphin Harris

The 2018 Trinidad and Tobago Charity Shield (known as the Digicel Charity Shield for sponsorship reasons) was the sixth edition of the Charity Shield, which is a football match that opened the 2018 Pro League season. The match will be played on 1 June 2018, between the winners of the previous season's TT Pro League and FA Trophy competitions. It officially kicks off the 2018 TT Pro League season. W Connection won their 4th title after beating North East Stars 7–1.

== Pre-match ==
=== Entry ===
W Connection qualified by winning the 2017 Trinidad and Tobago FA Trophy, defeating Police 3–1 in the final at Ato Boldon Stadium. W Connection claimed victories over Tamana United 12–0, Bethel United 3–0, Cunupia 3–2, Guaya United 1-0 and 1976 FC Phoenix 3-0 en route to the final. The 2017 FA Trophy was the Savonetta Boys' fifth title and consequently gained a berth in the 2018. Digicel Charity Shield.

North East Stars qualified for their first Charity Shield by clinching the TT Pro League title on 24 November 2018. It was their first Pro League title since 2004. North East Stars started Pro League by going 6 games unbeaten until they slipped up 1–0 against Point Fortin Civic F.C. From there they were already top of the league. The club would go on to lose only one game to finish 7 points ahead of second place W Connection and secured their second title after a thirteen-season drought.

== Match ==
=== Details ===
1 June 2018
19:00 (UTC-4)

North East Stars	1–7	W Connection
Powell 51' (pen.)	Report	Joseph 8', 30', 47'; Apai 34'; Corbin 51'; Thomas 61'; Noel 69'

Ato Boldon Stadium
Couva, Trinidad
Referee: Rodphin Harris

GK	1	(Trinidad and Tobago) Glenroy Samuel	(substituted off) 56'
	2	(Trinidad and Tobago) Jabari Brathwaite	Booked
	4	(Trinidad and Tobago) Sean Bateau (c)
	7	(Trinidad and Tobago) Hayden Tinto	(substituted off) 79'
	11	(Trinidad and Tobago) Kyle Bartholemew
	12	(Trinidad and Tobago) Tyrell Jobe	(substituted off) 57'
	15	(Trinidad and Tobago) Lashawn Roberts	(substituted off) 72'
	16	(Trinidad and Tobago) Daniel La Croix
	17	(Trinidad and Tobago) Shaqkeem Joseph
	18	(Trinidad and Tobago) Josiah Daniel	(substituted off) 57'
	20	(Trinidad and Tobago) Jaden Powell	Booked
Substitutes:
	13	(Trinidad and Tobago) Jeankeon Alexander	(substituted on) 57'
GK	21	(Trinidad and Tobago) Javon Sample	(substituted on) 56'
	23	(Trinidad and Tobago) Sherwyn Williams	(substituted on) 57'
GK	31	(Trinidad and Tobago) Jabari Bryce
	39	(Trinidad and Tobago) Bret D'Abreau	(substituted on) 79'
	32	(Trinidad and Tobago) Kaylan Seales
	33	(Trinidad and Tobago) Bradley Taitt	(substituted on) 72'
Manager:
(Serbia) Zoran Vraneš

GK	33	(Grenada) Jason Belfon
LB	2	(Saint Lucia) Kurt Frederick
3	(Saint Kitts and Nevis) Gerard Williams (c)	(substituted off) 61'
5	(Trinidad and Tobago) Triston Hodge	(substituted off) 68'
6	(Trinidad and Tobago) Kevon Goddard
9	(Trinidad and Tobago) Kadeem Corbin	(substituted off) 64'
10	(Suriname) Dimitrie Apai
20	(Trinidad and Tobago) Daniel Diaz	(substituted off) 56'
26	(Trinidad and Tobago) Isaiah Garcia
27	(Trinidad and Tobago) Kierron Mason	(substituted off) 56'
99	(Trinidad and Tobago) Marcus Joseph
Substitutes:
4	(Trinidad and Tobago) Maurice Ford	Booked	(substituted on) 68'
8	(Trinidad and Tobago) Jameel Antoine	(substituted on) 64'
11	(Trinidad and Tobago) Adan Noel	(substituted on) 56'
15	(Saint Lucia) Otev Lawrence	(substituted on) 61'
GK	18	(Saint Kitts and Nevis) Julani Archibald
19	(Dominica) Briel Thomas	Booked	(substituted on) 56'
23	(Grenada) Kennedy Hinkson
Manager:
(Saint Lucia) Stuart Charles-Fevrier

Assistant referees:
Kevin Lewis
Kerron Mayers
Fourth official:
Kwinsi Williams

== See also ==
- 2017 TT Pro League
- 2017 FA Trophy
