= 2017 TT Pro League =

TT Pro League
- Season: 2017
- Champions: North East Stars; 2nd Pro League title 2nd T&T title
- 2019 Caribbean Club Championship: North East Stars; W Connection
- Matches played: 90
- Goals scored: 263 (2.92 per match)
- Top goalscorer: Neil Benjamin 12 goals
- Biggest home win: Point Fortin Civic 7–0 St. Ann's Rangers (28 November 2017)
- Biggest away win: Central 0–6 North East Stars (22 September 2017)
- Highest scoring: San Juan Jabloteh 5–4 Point Fortin Civic (25 November 2017); Central 2–7 Police (28 November 2017)

The 2017 TT Pro League season is the nineteenth season of the TT Pro League, the Trinidad and Tobago professional league for association football clubs, since its establishment in 1999. A total of ten teams are contesting the league, with Central FC the defending champions from the 2016–17 season. The league will start on 9 June and will end on 28 November with the crowning of the champion. North East Stars were crowned champions on the penultimate match day. It was their first league title since 2004.

== Changes from the 2016–17 season ==
The following changes were made since the 2016–17 season:

- The Pro League returns to playing from June to December in 2017.
- The following club changes occurred following the 2016–17 season.
  - North East Stars will return to the Pro League after being sponsored by the franchise Ma Pau to form Ma Pau Stars. They will still be sponsored by Ma Pau but would not include the franchise in their name.
  - North East Stars will play at the Arima Velodrome.

=== Player transfers ===
- Carlos Edwards moved from North East Stars to Central.
- Marcus Joseph moved from Central to W Connection
  - September
- Densill Theobald moved to North East Stars from Mumbai F.C. in India.
- Kevon Goddard moved from W Connection to North East Stars.

=== Managerial changes ===
  - Preseason
- Reynold Carrington would come in as head coach for Point Fortin Civic.
- Jamaal Shabazz would replace Rajesh Latchoo at Morvant Caledonia United.
  - September
- Dale Saunders quits Central F.C. and is replaced by Stern John.
- Anthony Streete steps down to assistant coach as he is replaced by Adrian Romain at St. Ann's Rangers

== Teams ==
=== Team summaries ===
Location of the 2017 TT Pro League teams

Note: Flags indicate national team as has been defined under FIFA eligibility rules. Players may hold more than one non-FIFA nationality.

Team	Location	Stadium	Capacity	Manager	Captain
Central FC	California	Ato Boldon Stadium	10,000	(Trinidad and Tobago) Stern John	(Trinidad and Tobago) Sean de Silva
Club Sando	San Fernando	Mahaica Oval Pavilion	2,500	(Trinidad and Tobago) Angus Eve	(Trinidad and Tobago) Jared London
Defence Force	Chaguaramas	Hasely Crawford Stadium	27,000	(Trinidad and Tobago) Marvin Gordon	(Trinidad and Tobago) Corey Rivers
Morvant Caledonia United	Morvant/Laventille	Park Street Recreational Ground	3,000	(Trinidad and Tobago) Jamaal Shabazz	(Trinidad and Tobago) Kareem Joseph
North East Stars	Arima	Arima Velodrome	5,000	(Trinidad and Tobago) Derek King	(Trinidad and Tobago) Elton John
Point Fortin Civic	Point Fortin	Mahaica Oval Pavilion	2,500	(Trinidad and Tobago) Reynold Carrington	(Trinidad and Tobago) Kelvin Modeste
Police	Saint James	Manny Ramjohn Stadium	10,000	(Trinidad and Tobago) Richard Hood	(Trinidad and Tobago) Trent Noel
San Juan Jabloteh	San Juan	Hasely Crawford Stadium	27,000	(Trinidad and Tobago) Keith Jeffrey	(Jamaica) Damion Williams
St. Ann's Rangers	San Juan	Hasely Crawford Stadium	27,000	(Trinidad and Tobago) Adrian Romain	(Trinidad and Tobago) Terrence Lewis
W Connection	Point Lisas	Manny Ramjohn Stadium	10,000	(Saint Lucia) Stuart Charles-Fevrier	(Saint Kitts and Nevis) Gerard Williams

== Stadiums Used ==
Since the teams do not play in their set home stadium, these are the stadiums that were used to host the matches throughout the season.

Place	Stadium	No. of matches hosted
1	Ato Boldon Stadium	30
2	Hasely Crawford Stadium	13
3	Arima Velodrome	10
4	Mahaica Oval, Point Fortin	9
5	Barataria Oval, Barataria	8
6	Saint Augustine Secondary School Ground, Saint Augustine	6
7	Larry Gomes Stadium	5
7	Mannie Ramjohn Stadium	5
9	Hasely Crawford Stadium training field	3
10	Police Barracks Ground, Saint James	1

== League table ==
Pos	Team	Pld	W	D	L	GF	GA	GD	Pts
1	North East Stars (C)	18	12	4	2	39	15	+24	40
2	W Connection	18	10	3	5	33	19	+14	33
3	Defence Force	18	9	4	5	27	20	+7	31
4	Club Sando	18	8	6	4	28	16	+12	30
5	San Juan Jabloteh	18	8	2	8	27	33	−6	26
6	Morvant Caledonia United	18	6	4	8	19	21	−2	22
7	Point Fortin Civic	18	6	3	9	26	29	−3	21
8	Police	18	5	5	8	29	29	0	20
9	Central	18	4	5	9	23	37	−14	17
10	St. Ann's Rangers	18	2	4	12	12	44	−32	10

Updated to match(es) played on 28 November 2017. Source: TT Pro League
Rules for classification: 1) points; 2) goal difference; 3) number of goals scored.
(C) Champions

=== Positions by round ===
Leader
2018 CFU Club Championship First round

The table lists the positions of teams after each week of matches. In order to preserve chronological evolvements, any postponed matches are not included to the round at which they were originally scheduled, but added to the full round they were played immediately afterwards. For example, if a match is scheduled for the tenth round of matches, but then postponed and played between rounds 16 and 17, it will be added to the standings for round 16.

Team ╲ Round	1	2	3	4	5	6	7	8	9	10	11	12	13	14	15	16	17	18
North East Stars	3	2	2	1	1	1	1	1	1	1	1	1	1	1	1	1	1	1
W Connection	4	1	1	3	2	2	2	3	2	2	2	2	2	2	2	2	2	2
Defence Force	2	6	6	8	8	8	6	7	7	5	4	6	4	4	4	3	3	3
Club Sando	7	10	8	6	5	3	4	2	3	3	3	3	3	3	3	4	4	4
San Juan Jabloteh	6	5	4	2	3	4	3	4	4	4	5	4	5	6	7	5	5	5
Morvant Caledonia United	1	4	5	7	6	6	7	8	9	9	7	5	6	7	8	9	6	6
Point Fortin Civic	8	9	10	10	9	10	9	6	8	8	9	10	8	9	9	6	7	7
Police	9	7	7	5	7	7	8	9	6	7	8	8	9	8	5	7	8	8
Central FC	5	3	3	4	4	5	5	5	5	6	6	7	7	5	6	8	9	9
St. Ann's Rangers	10	8	9	9	10	9	10	10	10	10	10	9	10	10	10	10	10	10

Updated to match(es) played on 28 November 2017. Source: TT Pro League

== Results ==
=== Matches 1–18 ===
Home \ Away	CEN	CSA	DFO	MCU	NES	PFC	POL	SJJ	SAR	WCO
Central		1–1	0–4	3–2	0–6	5–0	2–7	0–0	0–1	1–3
Club Sando	2–0		2–1	1–2	0–2	4–2	4–0	5–0	2–0	1–1
Defence Force	0–4	0–0		0–0	1–2	0–0	1–0	1–0	4–0	2–1
Morvant Caledonia United	0–0	0–1	1–3		2–3	1–3	2–1	0–1	3–0	1–1
North East Stars	1–1	1–1	4–0	1–0		1–0	3–2	2–3	6–0	1–0
Point Fortin Civic	2–1	1–1	0–1	0–0	1–0		0–0	1–2	7–0	1–2
Police	3–0	1–0	2–2	1–1	0–1	1–2		3–2	1–1	1–0
San Juan Jabloteh	1–3	1–2	1–0	1–2	1–1	5–4	4–3		2–0	0–3
St. Ann's Rangers	2–2	0–0	2–3	1–0	1–2	1–2	2–2	0–2		1–5
W Connection	2–0	3–1	1–4	0–1	2–2	3–0	2–1	3–1	1–0	

Updated to match(es) played on 28 November 2017. Source: TT Pro League
Legend: Blue = home team win; Yellow = draw; Red = away team win.

== Season statistics ==
=== Top scorers ===
Rank	Player	Club	Goals
1	(Trinidad and Tobago) Neil Benjamin	W Connection	12
2	(Trinidad and Tobago) Rundell Winchester	North East Stars	10
3	(Guyana) Sheldon Holder	Morvant Caledonia United	8
3	(Trinidad and Tobago) Marcus Joseph	W Connection	8
5	(Trinidad and Tobago) Reon Moore	Defence Force	6
5	(Trinidad and Tobago) Jared Bennett	Point Fortin Civic	6
5	(Trinidad and Tobago) Sean Bonval	San Juan Jabloteh	6
8	(Trinidad and Tobago) Sean de Silva	Central	5
8	(Trinidad and Tobago) Akim Armstrong	Club Sando	5
8	(Trinidad and Tobago) Keron Cornwall	Club Sando	5
