= Trinidad and Tobago Civil Aviation Authority =

Trinidad and Tobago Civil Aviation Authority (TTCAA) is a government agency of Trinidad and Tobago, serving as that country's civil aviation authority. Its head office is in Piarco, in a complex located on the southern side of Piarco International Airport. Its previous head office was on the second floor of the PSA Building in Port of Spain.

The Civil Aviation Training Centre (CATC) is located along Mausica Road in Mausica, 1.5 kilometres (0.93 mi) north of the Churchill–Roosevelt Highway. Originally the training centre was along Long Circular Road in Saint James, an outlying suburb of Port of Spain. In 1992 it moved to Mausica, a location closer to Piarco International Airport than the previous one. Beginning on 1 October 2003 the CATC became a unit of the TTCAA.

The headquarters complex includes an administration building, a training school, and an area control centre.
