= 2012–13 TT Pro League =

TT Pro League
- Season: 2012–13
- Champions: Defence Force; 3rd Pro League title 22nd T&T title
- CFU Club Championship: Defence Force; Caledonia AIA
- Matches: 84
- Goals: 273 (3.25 per match)
- Top goalscorer: Devorn Jorsling (21 goals)
- Biggest home win: Defence Force 8–0 Rangers (4 January 2013)
- Biggest away win: T&TEC 0–7 W Connection (10 November 2012)
- Highest scoring: Defence Force 8–0 Rangers (4 January 2013)

The 2012–13 TT Pro League season (known as the Digicel Pro League for sponsorship reasons) was the fourteenth season of the TT Pro League, the Trinidad and Tobago professional league for association football clubs, since its establishment in 1999. A total of eight teams contested the league, with W Connection the defending champions. The season began on 14 September 2012 and ended on 10 May 2013 with the crowning of Defence Force as the league champion.

Speaking on the number of clubs in the Pro League prior to the start of the season, CEO Dexter Skeene stated in an interview that he feels the country's best footballing interests are served by an eight-team league. On 30 June 2012, San Juan Jabloteh announced that due to financial constraints the club suspended their football operations. As a result, the four-time Pro League champion, San Juan Kings, did not participate for the first time in the league's history. In response, a new club established by Brent Sancho to represent the Central region of the country, Central FC, was formed and officially applied for Pro League membership on 25 July 2012. The club is officially based in California and plays its home games in Ato Boldon Stadium. Central was admitted into the league on 6 September 2012 and became the 21st team to compete in the Pro League.

The first goal of the season was scored by two-time Golden Boot winner Devorn Jorsling of Defence Force against St. Ann's Rangers in the thirty-second minute of the first game on 14 September 2012. Bevon Bass of T&TEC scored the first hat-trick of the season as the Electricity Boys defeated St. Ann's Rangers 3–2 on 20 October 2012. Jorsling went on to claim an unprecedented third Golden Boot award after leading the league with 21 goals scored for Defence Force.

On 6 May 2013, Defence Force secured the TT Pro League championship following a Caledonia AIA 2–1 loss to Central FC in Couva. The league title was the Teteron Boys' second in three seasons and marked their third Pro League title overall. Consequently, Defence Force and Caledonia AIA, having finished as runners-up, earned places within the 2014 CFU Club Championship. Following the season, T&TEC withdrew from the league citing financial struggles to field a professional football club. The Electricity Boys became the seventh team to leave the league in the previous four years.

== Changes from the 2011–12 season ==
The following changes were made since the 2011–12 season:

- A new competition was introduced to open the Pro League season. The Charity Shield will contest the defending league champions and the winner of the previous year's Pro Bowl.
  - If the league champion also wins the Pro Bowl competition, then the Charity Shield will be contested by the top two teams in the previous league season.
- Clubs have the option to postpone their scheduled match if the club stands without three or more players on international duty.
- There were a number of changes to the clubs competing in the 2012–13 season.
  - San Juan Jabloteh suspended their football club operations and withdrew from the league.
  - After ending its two-year sponsorship with North East Stars, DirecTV and W Connection agreed to an undisclosed deal on 13 July 2012 to sponsor the Couva-based club.
  - Central FC, a new club based in the Central region of the country, officially applied for membership into the league on 25 July 2012.
    - The California-based club was officially admitted into the league on 6 September 2012 and intends to play its home matches in Ato Boldon Stadium.

== Teams ==
=== Team summaries ===
Location of the 2012–13 TT Pro League teams

Note: Flags indicate national team as has been defined under FIFA eligibility rules. Players may hold more than one non-FIFA nationality.

Team	Location	Stadium	Capacity	Manager	Captain
Caledonia AIA	Morvant/Laventille	Larry Gomes Stadium	10,000	(Trinidad and Tobago) Jerry Moe	(Trinidad and Tobago) Stephan David
Central FC	California	Ato Boldon Stadium	10,000	(England) Terry Fenwick	(Trinidad and Tobago) Marvin Phillip
Defence Force	Chaguaramas	Hasely Crawford Stadium	27,000	(Trinidad and Tobago) Ross Russell	(Trinidad and Tobago) Corey Rivers
North East Stars	Sangre Grande	Sangre Grande Ground	7,000	(Trinidad and Tobago) Angus Eve	(Trinidad and Tobago) Cleon John
Police	Saint James	Hasely Crawford Stadium	27,000	(Trinidad and Tobago) Richard Hood	(Trinidad and Tobago) Todd Ryan
St. Ann's Rangers	San Juan	Hasely Crawford Stadium	27,000	(Trinidad and Tobago) Dean Pacheco	(Trinidad and Tobago) Devon Modeste
T&TEC	San Fernando	Manny Ramjohn Stadium	10,000	(Trinidad and Tobago) Dexter Cyrus	(Trinidad and Tobago) Sylvester Teesdale
W Connection	Point Lisas	Manny Ramjohn Stadium	10,000	(Saint Lucia) Stuart Charles-Fevrier	(Saint Lucia) Elijah Joseph

=== Managerial changes ===
Team	Outgoing manager	Manner of departure	Date of vacancy	Table	Incoming manager	Date of appointment	Table
Central FC	Expansion team				(England) Graham Rix	13 August 2012	Pre-season
Police	(Trinidad and Tobago) Kelvin Jones	Sacked	29 August 2012	6th (2011–12)	(Trinidad and Tobago) Richard Hood	29 August 2012	Pre-season
T&TEC	(Trinidad and Tobago) Dexter Cyrus	Sacked	11 September 2012	2nd (2011–12)	(Trinidad and Tobago) Jefferson George	11 September 2012	Pre-season
T&TEC	(Trinidad and Tobago) Jefferson George	Resigned	10 November 2012	8th	(Trinidad and Tobago) Dexter Cyrus	22 November 2012	8th
Caledonia AIA	(Trinidad and Tobago) Jamaal Shabazz	Signed by Trinidad and Tobago	27 November 2012	1st	(Trinidad and Tobago) Jerry Moe	27 November 2012	1st
Central FC	(England) Graham Rix	Mutual consent	21 December 2012	6th	(England) Terry Fenwick	3 January 2013	6th
St. Ann's Rangers	(Trinidad and Tobago) Dean Pacheco	End of contract	30 June 2013	7th	(Trinidad and Tobago) Gilbert Bateau	1 July 2013	Postseason

== League table ==
Pos	Team	Pld	W	D	L	GF	GA	GD	Pts	Qualification
1	Defence Force (C)	21	14	4	3	52	21	+31	46	2014 CFU Club Championship First round
2	Caledonia AIA	21	13	3	5	53	27	+26	42	2014 CFU Club Championship First round
3	W Connection	21	11	5	5	45	19	+26	38	
4	North East Stars	21	10	8	3	32	17	+15	38	
5	Central FC	21	8	6	7	31	32	−1	30	
6	Police	21	3	7	11	25	43	−18	16	
7	St. Ann's Rangers	21	2	7	12	22	49	−27	13	
8	T&TEC	21	2	2	17	13	65	−52	8	Team disbanded after season (Note: T&TEC withdrew from the league citing financial struggles to cease its football operations prior to the 2013–14 season.)

Updated to match(es) played on 10 May 2013. Source: TT Pro League
Rules for classification: 1) points; 2) goal difference; 3) number of goals scored.
(C) Champions

=== Positions by round ===
Leader
2014 CFU Club Championship First round
Team disbanded after season

The table lists the positions of teams after each week of matches. In order to preserve chronological evolvements, any postponed matches are not included to the round at which they were originally scheduled, but added to the full round they were played immediately afterwards. For example, if a match is scheduled for the tenth round of matches, but then postponed and played between rounds 16 and 17, it will be added to the standings for round 16.

Team ╲ Round	1	2	3	4	5	6	7	8	9	10	11	12	13	14	15	16	17	18	19	20	21
Defence Force	3	3	6	3	2	2	2	1	1	1	1	1	1	1	1	1	1	1	1	1	1
Caledonia AIA	7	7	5	2	1	1	1	2	2	2	2	2	2	2	2	2	2	2	2	2	2
W Connection	5	4	3	1	3	4	3	3	3	3	3	4	3	3	3	4	3	4	3	3	3
North East Stars	1	2	2	4	4	3	4	4	4	4	4	3	4	4	4	3	4	3	4	4	4
Central FC	4	1	1	5	5	5	5	6	5	5	5	5	5	5	5	5	5	5	5	5	5
Police	2	5	4	6	7	6	6	5	6	6	6	6	6	6	6	6	6	6	6	6	6
St. Ann's Rangers	6	8	8	7	6	7	7	7	7	7	7	7	7	7	7	7	7	7	7	7	7
T&TEC	8	6	7	8	8	8	8	8	8	8	8	8	8	8	8	8	8	8	8	8	8

Updated to match(es) played on 10 May 2013. Source: TT Pro League

== Results ==
=== Matches 1–14 ===
Home \ Away	CAL	CEN	DEF	NES	POL	RAN	TEC	WCO
Caledonia AIA		5–2	4–2	1–3	3–1	2–1	6–0	0–0
Central FC	3–2		1–1	2–1	1–0	2–3	2–1	0–3
Defence Force	5–1	3–0		3–3	3–1	8–0	3–2	5–1
North East Stars	0–1	0–0	0–1		1–1	2–2	3–1	2–0
Police	1–5	0–0	0–1	1–2		2–2	2–0	2–5
St. Ann's Rangers	2–4	1–3	1–2	0–0	3–3		2–3	1–2
T&TEC	0–6	1–1	1–1	0–1	0–2	0–1		0–7
W Connection	1–1	1–0	1–2	0–0	1–1	2–0	3–1	

Updated to match(es) played on 6 March 2013. Source: TT Pro League
Legend: Blue = home team win; Yellow = draw; Red = away team win.

=== Matches 15–21 ===
Home \ Away	CAL	CEN	DEF	NES	POL	RAN	TEC	WCO
Caledonia AIA			0–0			3–0	4–1	
Central FC	2–1				4–2		5–0	2–2
Defence Force		3–0		0–1			4–0	
North East Stars	3–1	1–0			2–2	1–1		
Police	0–2		0–2				3–0	0–5
St. Ann's Rangers		1–1	0–3		1–1			
T&TEC				0–5		2–0		0–4
W Connection	0–1		4–0	0–1		3–0		

Updated to match(es) played on 10 May 2013. Source: TT Pro League
Legend: Blue = home team win; Yellow = draw; Red = away team win.

== Season statistics ==
=== Scoring ===
- First goal of the season: Devorn Jorsling for Defence Force against St. Ann's Rangers, 14 September 2012.
- Last goal of the season: Jerwyn Balthazar for Defence Force against T&TEC, 10 May 2013.
- First own goal of the season: Daneil Cyrus (W Connection) for Defence Force. (21 December 2012)
- First penalty kick of the season: Richard Roy (scored) for Defence Force against St. Ann's Rangers, 14 September 2012.
- First hat-trick of the season: Bevon Bass (T&TEC) against St. Ann's Rangers, 5', 29', 42' (20 October 2012)
- Most goals scored by one player in a match: 4 goals
  - Peter Byers (Central FC) against T&TEC, 41', 59', 80', 86' (16 March 2013)
- Widest winning margin: 8 goals
  - Defence Force 8–0 St. Ann's Rangers (4 January 2013)
- Most goals in a match: 8 goals
  - Defence Force 8–0 St. Ann's Rangers (4 January 2013)
- Most goals in one half: 6 goals
  - Defence Force v W Connection (21 December 2012) 0–0 at half-time, 5–1 final.
- Most goals in one half by a single team: 5 goals
  - Defence Force v W Connection (21 December 2012) 0–0 at half-time, 5–1 final.
  - T&TEC v North East Stars (6 May 2013) 0–0 at half-time, 0–5 final.

==== Top scorers ====
Rank	Player	Club	Goals
1	(Trinidad and Tobago) Devorn Jorsling	Defence Force	21
2	(Trinidad and Tobago) Cornell Glen	North East Stars	16
3	(Trinidad and Tobago) Kevon Carter	Defence Force	10
3	(Trinidad and Tobago) Joevin Jones	W Connection	10
5	(Trinidad and Tobago) Devon Modeste	St. Ann's Rangers	9
6	(Antigua and Barbuda) Peter Byers	Central FC	8
7	(Trinidad and Tobago) Josimar Belgrave	Defence Force	7
7	(Trinidad and Tobago) Keyon Edwards	Caledonia AIA	7
7	(Trinidad and Tobago) Kareem Joseph	Caledonia AIA	7
7	(Trinidad and Tobago) Andrei Pacheco	W Connection	7
7	(Trinidad and Tobago) Shahdon Winchester	W Connection	7

==== Hat-tricks ====
Player	For	Against	Result	Date	Ref(s)
(Trinidad and Tobago) Bevon Bass	T&TEC*	St. Ann's Rangers	3–2	20 October 2012	
(Trinidad and Tobago) Josimar Belgrave	Defence Force*	North East Stars	3–3	20 October 2012	
(Trinidad and Tobago) Ataullah Guerra	Caledonia AIA	T&TEC*	0–6	3 November 2012	
(Trinidad and Tobago) Keyon Edwards	Caledonia AIA	Police*	1–5	9 November 2012	
(Trinidad and Tobago) Kevon Carter	Defence Force*	St. Ann's Rangers	8–0	4 January 2013	
(Trinidad and Tobago) Shahdon Winchester	W Connection	Central FC*	0–3	5 January 2013	
(Trinidad and Tobago) Cornell Glen	North East Stars*	T&TEC	3–1	15 February 2013	
(Trinidad and Tobago) Joevin Jones	W Connection	Police*	2–5	22 February 2013	
(Trinidad and Tobago) Marvin Lee	St. Ann's Rangers	Police*	3–3	27 February 2013	
(Antigua and Barbuda) Peter Byers^{4}	Central FC*	T&TEC	5–0	16 March 2013	
(Trinidad and Tobago) Devorn Jorsling	Defence Force*	Central FC	3–0	5 April 2013	
(Trinidad and Tobago) Neil Benjamin	W Connection*	Defence Force	4–0	6 May 2013	
(Trinidad and Tobago) Andrei Pacheco	W Connection	Police*	0–5	10 May 2013	

- * Home team score first in result
- ^{4} Player scored four goals

=== Discipline ===
- First yellow card of the season: Jason Marcano for St. Ann's Rangers against Defence Force, 14 September 2012.
- First red card of the season: Glen Sutton for T&TEC against Caledonia AIA, 3 November 2012.
- Most yellow cards in a single match: 8
  - North East Stars 0–0 Central FC – 5 for North East Stars (Kareem Moses (2), Glenton Wolfe, Jeromie Williams & Elijah Manners) and 3 for Central FC (Wesley John, Johan Peltier & Darren Mitchell) (6 March 2013)
- Most red cards in a single match: 3
  - Defence Force 3–0 Central FC – 1 for Defence Force (Keston Williams) and 2 for Central FC (Marvin Phillip & Wesley John) (5 April 2013)

== Awards ==
=== Monthly awards ===
Month	Manager of the Month		Player of the Month		Ref(s)
Month	Player	Club	Manager	Club	Ref(s)
September/October	(Trinidad and Tobago) Jerry Moe	Caledonia AIA	(Trinidad and Tobago) Devorn Jorsling	Defence Force	
