= List of Trinidad and Tobago football champions =

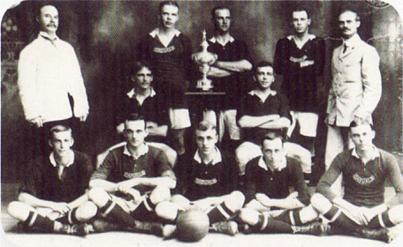
Casuals in 1908, runner-up in the first season of the Port of Spain Football League

Defence Force became the second club in CONCACAF to achieve the treble having won the National League, FA Trophy, and Champions' Cup in 1985

The Trinidad and Tobago football champions are the winners of the highest league in Trinidad and Tobago football, which is currently the TT Pro League. Teams in bold are those who won the double of the Pro League championship and FA Trophy, or the continental double of the league championship and CONCACAF Champions League in that season. Teams in italics are those who won the treble of the league championship, FA Trophy, and Champions League.

Defence Force has 22 league championships, which is the record for most titles won. Defence Force dominated the National League and Semi-Professional League during the 1970s, 1980s, and 1990s. Maple Club of Port of Spain are currently second; their 13 titles beginning in 1927 and the last in 1969, all from the Port of Spain Football League. Casuals, who have ten, won three of the first six seasons in the Port of Spain Football League. Defence Force remains the only club to win the league championship for seven consecutive seasons from 1972–1978.

There have been 13 teams that have completed the double, which are: Defence Force (5 times), Everton (3), ASL Sports Club (2), Maple Club (2), Trintoc (2), W Connection (2), Casuals, Colts, Joe Public, Paragon, Police, Regiment, and Shamrock. Defence Force remains the only Trinidadian club to have completed the treble in 1985.

== Port of Spain Football League (1908–1973) ==
Season	Champions (number of titles)	Runners-up	Third place	Top goalscorer	
Season	Champions (number of titles)	Runners-up	Third place	Player(s)	Goals
1908	Clydesdale	Casuals	Local Forces	Unknown	
1909	Casuals	Shamrock	Local Forces	(Trinidad and Tobago) Mikey Cipriani	15
1910	Shamrock	Casuals	Clydesdale	Unknown	
1911	Shamrock (2)	Casuals	Local Forces	Unknown	
1912	Casuals (2)	Unknown	Unknown	Unknown	
1913	Casuals (3)	Clydesdale	Shamrock	Unknown	
1914	Clydesdale (2)	Shamrock	Casuals	Unknown	
1915	Clydesdale (3)	Shamrock	Casuals	Unknown	
1916–18	League suspended due to the First World War				
1919	Queen's Park	Unknown	Unknown	Unknown	
1920	Royal Sussex	Unknown	Unknown	Unknown	
1921	Casuals (4)	Unknown	Unknown	Unknown	
1922	Shamrock (3)	Unknown	Unknown	Unknown	
1923	Shamrock (4)	Unknown	Unknown	Unknown	
1924	Shamrock (5)	Unknown	Unknown	Unknown	
1925	Shamrock (6)	Unknown	Unknown	Unknown	
1926	Sporting Club	Unknown	Unknown	Unknown	
1927	Maple Club	Unknown	Unknown	Unknown	
1928	Maple Club (2)	Unknown	Unknown	Unknown	
1929	Casuals (5)	Unknown	Unknown	Unknown	
1930	**Everton**	Unknown	Unknown	Unknown	
1931	**Everton** (2)	Maple Club	Shamrock	Unknown	
1932	**Everton** (3)	Unknown	Unknown	Unknown	
1933	Queen's Royal College	Unknown	Unknown	Unknown	
1934	**Casuals** (6)	Unknown	Unknown	Unknown	
1935	Casuals (7)	Unknown	Unknown	Unknown	
1936	Sporting Club (2)	Unknown	Unknown	Unknown	
1937	Sporting Club (3)	Unknown	Unknown	Unknown	
1938	Casuals (8)	Sporting Club	Unknown	Unknown	
1939	Notre Dame	Unknown	Unknown	Unknown	
1940	Casuals (9)	Unknown	Unknown	Unknown	
1941	Casuals (10)	Unknown	Unknown	Unknown	
1942	Colts	Unknown	Unknown	Unknown	
1943	Fleet Air Arm	Unknown	Unknown	Unknown	
1944	Shamrock (7)	Unknown	Unknown	Unknown	
1945	**Colts** (2)	Unknown	Unknown	Unknown	
1946	Notre Dame (2)	Sporting Club	Shamrock	Unknown	
1947	Colts (3)	Malvern United	Notre Dame	Unknown	
1948	Malvern United	Notre Dame	Sporting Club	Unknown	
1949	Malvern United (2)	Maple Club	Colts	Unknown	
1950	Maple Club (3)	Malvern United	Notre Dame	Unknown	
1951	Maple Club (4)	Notre Dame	Colts	Unknown	
1952	Maple Club (5)	Malvern United	Colts	Unknown	
1953	Maple Club (6)	Sporting Club	Malvern United	Unknown	
1954	Sporting Club (4)	Maple Club	Colts	Unknown	
1955	Sporting Club (5)	Malvern United	Maple Club	Unknown	
1956	Notre Dame (3)	Providence	Maple Club	Unknown	
1957	Colts (4)	Maple Club	Shamrock	Unknown	
1958	Shamrock (8)	Malvern United	Casuals	Unknown	
1959	Shamrock (9)	Malvern United	Maple Club	Unknown	
1960	Maple Club(7)	Malvern United	Sporting Club	Unknown	
1961	Maple Club (8)	Malvern United	Dynamos	Unknown	
1962	Maple Club (9)	Shamrock	Malvern United	Unknown	
1963	Maple Club (10)	Regiment	Colts	Unknown	
1964	Paragon (1)	Maple Club	Sporting Club	Unknown	
1965	Regiment (1)	Shamrock	Malvern United	Unknown	
1966	Regiment (2)	Maple Club	Paragon	Unknown	
1967	Maple Club (11)	Regiment	Malvern United	Unknown	
1968	Maple Club (12)	Paragon	Malvern United	Unknown	
1969	Maple Club (13)	Malvern United	Regiment	Unknown	
1970	Regiment (3)	Police	Malvern United	Unknown	
1971	Season not finished				
1972	Defence Force (4)	Malvern United	Paragon	Unknown	
1973	Defence Force (5)	Maple Club	Police	Unknown	

== National League (1974–1995) ==
Season	Champions (number of titles)	Runners-up	Third place	Top goalscorer	
Season	Champions (number of titles)	Runners-up	Third place	Player(s)	Goals
1974	Defence Force (1)	Maple Club	Point Fortin Civic	Unknown	
1975	Defence Force (2)	Malvern United	Police	Ron La Forest (Defence Force)	
1976	Defence Force (3)	CCI Falcons	Malvern United	Ron La Forest (Defence Force)	
1977	Defence Force (4)	Malvern United	Caroni United	Ron La Forest (Defence Force)	
1978	Defence Force (5)	Tesero Palo Seco Sports Club	Malvern United	Unknown	
1979	Police (1)	Defence Force	CCI Falcons	Unknown	
1980	Defence Force (6)	ASL Sports Club	Police	Unknown	
1981*	Defence Force (National League) (7); ASL Sports Club (TTPSL) (1)	Tesoro Palo Seco (National League); Challengers (TTPSL)	KFC Memphis United (National League); ECM Motown United (TTPSL)	Unknown	
1982*	Defence Force (National League) (8); ASL Sports Club (CPL) (2)	Forest Reserve Estate Police (National League); KFC Memphis United (CPL) San Fernando Strikers (CPL)	Unknown		
1983*	Defence Force (National League) (9); ASL Sports Club (TTPFL) (3)	Forest Reserve Estate Police (National League); KFC Memphis United (TTPFL)	Tesoro Palo Seco (National League); Malvern United (TTPFL)	Unknown	
1984	Defence Force (10)	ECM Motown United	Tacarigua United	Unknown	
1985*	Defence Force (National League) (11); ASL Sports Club (TTFL) (4)	Trinitoc (National League); ECM Motown United (TTFL)	Malvern United (National League); KFC Memphis United (TTFL)	Unknown	
1986	Trintoc (1)	Defence Force	La Brea Angels	Philbert Jones (Trintoc)	
1987	Defence Force (12)	La Brea Angels	Trintoc	Unknown	
1988	Trintoc (2)	Defence Force	La Brea Angels	Philbert Jones (Trintoc)	
1989	Defence Force (13)	Trintoc	Police	Unknown	
1990	Defence Force (14)	Police	Trintoc	Unknown	
1991	Police (2)	Defence Force	ECM Motown United	Unknown	
1992	Defence Force (15)	ECM Motown United	Trintopec	Unknown	
1993	Defence Force (16)	United Petrotrin	Trinity Falcons	Unknown	
1994	Police (3)	Defence Force	Superstar Rangers	Unknown	
1995	Defence Force (17)	Police	Point Fortin Civic	Unknown	

- NOTE: In seasons 1981, 1982 and 1983, rival leagues were in operation. It was agreed that the top five clubs from each league plus the national under-21 squad would form an 11 team united league for 1984.

ASL Sports won the league, but refused to enter the play-offs which had been hastily added to the schedule near the end of the regular season. Stripped of their league crown, ASL Sports withdrew from the national league. Four national league clubs (ECM Motown, Tacarigua United, HAS Cocorite United and KFC Memphis) and three other clubs followed suit to form an eight team rival league for the 1985-season.

== Semi-Professional League (1996–1998) ==
Season	Champions (number of titles)	Runners-up	Third place	Top goalscorer	
Season	Champions (number of titles)	Runners-up	Third place	Player(s)	Goals
1996	**Defence Force** (18)	Unknown	Unknown	Unknown	
1997	Defence Force (19)	Joe Public	Caledonia AIA	(Trinidad and Tobago) Gary Glasgow (Defence Force)	26
1998	Joe Public	Caledonia AIA	Queen's Park	(Saint Lucia) Kendall Velox (Caledonia AIA)	19

== TT Pro League (1999–present) ==
Season	Champions (number of titles)	Points	Runners-up	Points	Third place	Points	Top goalscorer	
Season	Champions (number of titles)	Points	Runners-up	Points	Third place	Points	Player(s)	Goals
1999	Defence Force (20)	64	Joe Public	55	W Connection	55	(Trinidad and Tobago) Arnold Dwarika (Joe Public)	45
2000	**W Connection**	52	Defence Force	51	San Juan Jabloteh	47	(Trinidad and Tobago) Jason Scotland (Defence Force)	22
2001	W Connection (2)	37	Joe Public	35	Defence Force	24	(Saint Lucia) Earl Jean (W Connection)	14
2002	San Juan Jabloteh	65	W Connection	62	Joe Public	48	(Trinidad and Tobago) Sean Julien (South Starworld Strikers)	16
2003–04	San Juan Jabloteh (2)	92	W Connection	80	North East Stars	64	(Guyana) Randolph Jerome (North East Stars)	28
2004	North East Stars	47	W Connection	41	San Juan Jabloteh	41	(Trinidad and Tobago) Jerren Nixon (North East Stars)	37
2005	W Connection (3)	54	San Juan Jabloteh	39	Defence Force	34	(Brazil) Gefferson (W Connection)	14
2005	W Connection (3)	54	San Juan Jabloteh	39	Defence Force	34	(Saint Lucia) Earl Jean (W Connection)	14
2006	Joe Public (2)	59	W Connection	54	San Juan Jabloteh	50	(Jamaica) Roen Nelson (Joe Public)	16
2006	Joe Public (2)	59	W Connection	54	San Juan Jabloteh	50	(Trinidad and Tobago) Anthony Wolfe (San Juan Jabloteh)	16
2007	San Juan Jabloteh (3)	62	Joe Public	57	W Connection	54	(Antigua and Barbuda) Peter Byers (San Juan Jabloteh)	15
2008	San Juan Jabloteh (4)	74	W Connection	72	North East Stars	47	(Trinidad and Tobago) Devorn Jorsling (Defence Force)	21
2009	**Joe Public** (3)	52	San Juan Jabloteh	49	Caledonia AIA	47	(Trinidad and Tobago) Kerry Baptiste (Joe Public)	35
2010–11	Defence Force (21)	41	Caledonia AIA	36	Joe Public	35	(Trinidad and Tobago) Devorn Jorsling (Defence Force)	15
2011–12	W Connection (4)	40	T&TEC	39	Caledonia AIA	38	(Trinidad and Tobago) Richard Roy (Defence Force)	15
2012–13	Defence Force (22)	46	Caledonia AIA	42	W Connection	38	(Trinidad and Tobago) Devorn Jorsling (Defence Force)	21
2013–14	**W Connection** (5)	50	Central FC	45	Defence Force	45	(Trinidad and Tobago) Marcus Joseph (Point Fortin)	16
2014–15	Central FC	55	W Connection	49	Defence Force	39	(Trinidad and Tobago) Devorn Jorsling (Defence Force)	21
2015–16	Central FC (2)	58	San Juan Jabloteh	54	Defence Force	49	(Trinidad and Tobago) Makesi Lewis (Police)	21
2016–17	Central FC (3)	47	W Connection	46	San Juan Jabloteh	29	(Trinidad and Tobago) Akeem Roach (Club Sando F.C.)	12
2017	North East Stars (2)	40	W Connection	33	Defence Force	31	(Trinidad and Tobago) Neil Benjamin (W Connection)	12
2018	W Connection (6)	37	Central	36	Sando	33	(Trinidad and Tobago) Marcus Joseph (W Connection)	18
2019–20	Defence Force (23)	42	La Horquetta Rangers	35	Point Fortin Civic	28	(Trinidad and Tobago) Shaqkeem Joseph (Sando)	11
2020–22	No tournament.							
2023	Defence Force (24)	56	Port of Spain	55	Club Sando	48	(Trinidad and Tobago) Nathaniel James (Sando)	17
2023–24	AC Port of Spain (3)	44	Police FC	42	Defence Force	40		
2024–25	Defence Force (25)	62	Central	46	Police FC	45		

== Total titles won ==
Twenty-four clubs have been crowned champions in the highest division of Trinidad and Tobago football.
Clubs in bold compete in the TTPFL as of the 2024 season.

Rank	Club	Number of titles	Winning seasons
1	**Defence Force**	25	1972, 1973, 1974, 1975, 1976, 1977, 1978, 1980, 1981, 1984, 1985, 1987, 1989, 1990, 1992, 1993, 1995, 1996, 1997, 1999, 2010–11, 2012–13, 2019–20, 2023, 2024–25
2	Maple Club	13	1927, 1928, 1950, 1951, 1952, 1953, 1960, 1961, 1962, 1963, 1967, 1968, 1969
3	Casuals	10	1909, 1912, 1913, 1921, 1929, 1934, 1935, 1938, 1940, 1941
4	Shamrock	9	1910, 1911, 1922, 1923, 1924, 1925, 1944, 1958, 1959
5	W Connection	6	2000, 2001, 2005, 2011–12, 2013–14, 2018
6	Sporting Club	5	1926, 1936, 1937, 1954, 1955
7	Colts	4	1942, 1945, 1947, 1957
7	San Juan Jabloteh	4	2002, 2003–04, 2007, 2008
9	**Central FC**	3	2014–15, 2015–16, 2016–17
9	Clydesdale	3	1908, 1914, 1915
9	Everton	3	1930, 1931, 1932
9	Joe Public	3	1998, 2006, 2009
9	Notre Dame	3	1939, 1946, 1956
9	**Police**	3	1979, 1991, 1994
9	Regiment	3	1965, 1966, 1970
9	**AC Port of Spain (North East Stars)**	3	2004, 2017, 2023–24
17	ASL Sports Club	2	1982, 1983
17	Malvern United	2	1948, 1949
17	Trintoc	2	1986, 1988
20	Fleet Air Arm	1	1943
20	Paragon	1	1964
20	Queen's Park	1	1919
20	Queen's Royal College	1	1933
20	Royal Sussex	1	1920

== Multiple trophy wins ==
See The Double and The Treble

== See also ==
- Trinidad and Tobago football league system
- Association football in Trinidad and Tobago
- List of TT Pro League seasons
