= Stuart Charles-Fevrier =

Saint Lucian football manager

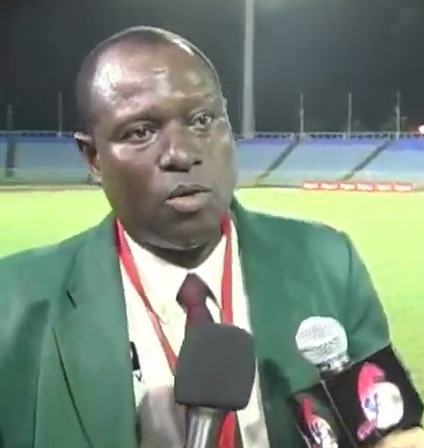
- Charles-Fevrier at an interview after the Digicel Pro Bowl Final 2013

Personal information
- Date of birth: 19 January 1959 (age 67)
- Place of birth: Curacao
- Position: Defender

Team information
- Current team: W Connection F.C. (manager)

Senior career*
Years	Team	Apps	(Gls)
- Fulham
- Pro Pioneers FC
- Coventry Sphinx F.C.
- ASL Sports Club
- Trintoc

International career
1974–19??	Saint Lucia		

Managerial career
- 19??–19??: Saint Lucia U-23
- Saint Lucia
- 1999–2003: W Connection F.C.
- 2003: Trinidad & Tobago
- 2017–2019: Trinidad & Tobago (assistant)
- 2004–: W Connection F.C.
- * Club domestic league appearances and goals

Stuart Charles-Fevrier or Stuart Charles Fevrier (born 19 January 1959) is a Saint Lucian professional football manager. Born in Curacao, he was raised in Saint Lucia where he is from. Recently, in February 2017, he became assistant coach for the Trinidad and Tobago national football team by a unanimous decision after being shortlisted for manager by the Trinidad and Tobago Football Association technical committee.

== Playing career ==
A defender, Fevrier started for Saint Lucia from age 15. He spent the majority of his career in Trinidad and Tobago. In his first years with Trintoc, he won the domestic league title with them.

== Managerial career ==
After consulting his wife Claudia, Fevrier ventured to Trinidad and Tobago by invitation of W Connection president David John-Williams in January 1999 to coach W Connection F.C. Coaching W Connection F.C. since its foundation, he has won vast quantities of silverware throughout his entire career as a manager. According to David John-Williams, he was recommended by former professional Stephen Hart.

Over the years, Fevrier took a number of managerial training courses in Hungary, Brazil, and England, completing all the relevant other FIFA courses as well. Back in 2003, he took over as head director of the Trinidad and Tobago national football team from the sacked Hannibal Najjar until he was replaced by Bertile Saint Clair. Through his whole career as coach he has won five titles with W Connection F.C. and came runners-up in the 2016-17 TT Pro League, trailing behind Central FC.

== Achievements and honors ==
- TT Pro League: Champions(6): 2000, 2001, 2005, 2011-12, 2013-14, 2018.
- Trinidad and Tobago Cup(5): 1999, 2000, 2002, 2013-14, 2017.
- Trinidad and Tobago League Cup(8): 2001, 2004, 2005, 2006, 2007, 2008, 2015, 2017.
- Trinidad and Tobago Charity Shield(4): 2012, 2013, 2014, 2018
- Trinidad and Tobago Classic(3): 2005, 2011, 2013.
- Trinidad and Tobago Pro Bowl(6): 2001, 2002, 2004, 2007, 2013, 2014.
- Trinidad and Tobago Goal Shield(2): 2009, 2013.

=== International honors ===
- CFU Club Championship(2): 2006, 2009.

== Individual awards ==
- Saint Lucia Medal of Merit
- 25 True Ambassadors- 25 people who have made a valuable contribution to Sport in Saint Lucia over the years.
