= Keston Williams =

Trinidad and Tobago footballer

Personal information
- Full name: Keston Williams
- Date of birth: 25 March 1988 (age 38)
- Place of birth: Trinidad and Tobago
- Position: Defender

Team information
- Current team: Defence Force

Senior career*
Years	Team	Apps	(Gls)
	Defence Force	?	(3)

International career^{‡}
2007–2010	Trinidad and Tobago	11	(0)
- * Club domestic league appearances and goals as of 06:48, 29 May 2010 (UTC) ‡ National team caps and goals as of 06:48, 29 May 2010 (UTC)

Keston Williams (born 25 March 1988) is an international soccer player from Trinidad and Tobago who plays professionally for Defence Force as a defender.
