= 2013–14 TT Pro League =

TT Pro League
- Season: 2013–14
- Champions: W Connection; 5th Pro League title 5th T&T title
- CFU Club Championship: W Connection; Central FC
- Matches: 108
- Goals: 318 (2.94 per match)
- Top goalscorer: Marcus Joseph (16 goals)
- Biggest home win: Central FC 6–0 Rangers (21 February 2014)
- Biggest away win: Rangers 0–7 W Connection (14 September 2013)
- Highest scoring: Jabloteh 6–5 Rangers (20 September 2013)

The 2013–14 TT Pro League season (known as the Digicel Pro League for sponsorship reasons) was the fifteenth season of the TT Pro League, the Trinidad and Tobago professional league for association football clubs, since its establishment in 1999. A total of nine teams contested the league, with Defence Force the defending champions. The season began on 13 September 2013 and concluded on 20 May 2014 with the crowning of W Connection as the league champion.

During the previous league season, Point Fortin Civic gained momentum in returning as a professional club following a streak of solid performances during the 2012 TOYOTA Classic and 2012–13 FA Trophy over Pro League competition. After the previous season had concluded, the Pro League announced that T&TEC had withdrawn from the league citing financial difficulties to sustain its football operations. As a result, Point Fortin Civic announced its intentions to apply for Pro League membership on 16 August 2013. The following month, the club officially made its return to the Pro League after being granted membership. Furthermore, the Pro League announced on 10 September 2013 that San Juan Jabloteh were also re-admitted into the league following the club's one-year absence due to difficulties securing a long-term sponsor.

The first goal of the season was scored by Defence Force's Kerry Joseph against Central FC in the seventh minute of the first game on 13 September 2013. The following day, Kurt Frederick of W Connection recorded the first hat-trick of the season as the Savonetta Boys shutout St. Ann's Rangers 7–0 in Hasely Crawford Stadium. Marcus Joseph used hat-tricks on consecutive starts in wins over Police and St. Ann's Rangers, respectively, to claim his first Golden Boot with 16 goals for Point Fortin Civic.

On 6 May 2014, W Connection used an emphatic 4–1 win over defending champions Defence Force at Hasely Crawford Stadium to be crowned champions for a Pro League record fifth time (2000, 2001, 2005, and 2011–12). The league championship marked the second Pro League title in three seasons for the Savonetta Boys and their second domestic double after claiming the FA Trophy earlier in the season. In addition, having finished as the league champions, W Connection qualified for the 2015 CFU Club Championship. One week later, Central FC also qualified for the Caribbean Club Championship following a 3–0 win against St. Ann's Rangers and a Defence Force 1–0 loss to San Juan Jabloteh during the final round of matches.

However, the season was overshadowed by the death of Defence Force and national team midfielder Kevon Carter from a sudden heart attack following a team training session on the morning of 28 February 2014. Carter complained of chest pains after training at Macqueripe and was taken to the army's medical department. He was subsequently driven to Community Hospital of Seventh-Day Adventists in St. James where Carter was pronounced dead before receiving treatment.

== Changes from the 2012–13 season ==
The following changes were made since the 2012–13 season:

- Central FC and Walsall of Football League One agreed to a partnership that featured the Saddlers' in a pre-season tour of Trinidad and Tobago.
  - During the pre-season tour, Walsall participated in coaching clinics and exhibition matches against Stokely Vale, Central FC, and a Pro League XI.
- Dexter Skeene, Pro League CEO, announced that the prize money awarded to the Pro League champions was increased to TT$1 million (up from TT$400,000).
- There were a number of changes to the clubs competing in the 2013–14 season.
  - T&TEC withdrew from the league due to financial struggles to continue its football operations.
  - Point Fortin Civic applied for admission and were accepted back in the Pro League after a being expelled following the league's inaugural season.
    - The club announced a sponsorship agreement with Worldwide Safety and will appear on the front of each match shirt.
  - After suspending its football operations, San Juan Jabloteh were re-admitted into the league following a one-year absence.
  - Central FC announced on 13 September 2013 that Super Industrial Services had become the main sponsors of the club.
  - A six-year sponsorship agreement was reached between St. Ann's Rangers and PlusOne Fashion for US$75,000 each year.

== Teams ==
=== Team summaries ===
Location of the 2013–14 TT Pro League teams

Note: Flags indicate national team as has been defined under FIFA eligibility rules. Players may hold more than one non-FIFA nationality.

Team	Location	Stadium	Capacity	Manager	Captain
Caledonia AIA	Morvant/Laventille	Larry Gomes Stadium	10,000	(Trinidad and Tobago) Jamaal Shabazz	(Trinidad and Tobago) Stephan David
Central FC	California	Ato Boldon Stadium	10,000	(England) Terry Fenwick	(Trinidad and Tobago) Marvin Oliver
Defence Force	Chaguaramas	Hasely Crawford Stadium	27,000	(Trinidad and Tobago) Ross Russell	(Trinidad and Tobago) Corey Rivers
North East Stars	Sangre Grande	Sangre Grande Ground	7,000	(Trinidad and Tobago) Angus Eve	(Trinidad and Tobago) Cleon John
Point Fortin Civic	Point Fortin	Mahaica Oval Pavilion	2,500	(Trinidad and Tobago) Reynold Carrington	(Trinidad and Tobago) Kelvin Modeste
Police	Saint James	Hasely Crawford Stadium	27,000	(Trinidad and Tobago) Richard Hood	(Trinidad and Tobago) Trent Noel
San Juan Jabloteh	San Juan	Hasely Crawford Stadium	27,000	(Trinidad and Tobago) Keith Jeffrey	(Trinidad and Tobago) Kerry Baptiste
St. Ann's Rangers	San Juan	Hasely Crawford Stadium	27,000	(Trinidad and Tobago) Anthony Streete	(Trinidad and Tobago) Terrence Lewis
W Connection	Point Lisas	Manny Ramjohn Stadium	10,000	(Saint Lucia) Stuart Charles-Fevrier	(Saint Kitts and Nevis) Gerard Williams

=== Managerial changes ===
Team	Outgoing manager	Manner of departure	Date of vacancy	Table	Incoming manager	Date of appointment	Table
Point Fortin Civic	Re-admitted team				(Trinidad and Tobago) Reynold Carrington	10 September 2013	Pre-season
San Juan Jabloteh	Re-admitted team				(Trinidad and Tobago) Keith Jeffrey	10 September 2013	Pre-season
Caledonia AIA	(Trinidad and Tobago) Jerry Moe	End of caretaker contract	30 June 2013	2nd (2012–13)	(Trinidad and Tobago) Jamaal Shabazz	1 July 2013	Pre-season
St. Ann's Rangers	(Trinidad and Tobago) Gilbert Bateau	Sacked	20 March 2014	9th	(Trinidad and Tobago) Anthony Streete	20 March 2014	9th
Central FC	(England) Terry Fenwick	Resigned	16 May 2014	2nd	(Serbia) Zoran Vraneš	10 July 2014	Postseason

== League table ==
Pos	Team	Pld	W	D	L	GF	GA	GD	Pts	Qualification
1	W Connection (C)	24	14	8	2	51	19	+32	50	2015 CFU Club Championship First round
2	Central FC	24	12	9	3	49	21	+28	45	2015 CFU Club Championship First round
3	Defence Force	24	14	3	7	47	32	+15	45	
4	Point Fortin Civic	24	13	3	8	37	25	+12	42	
5	North East Stars	24	12	6	6	28	17	+11	42	
6	Caledonia AIA	24	7	7	10	34	38	−4	28	
7	Police	24	8	3	13	30	45	−15	27	
8	San Juan Jabloteh	24	4	4	16	23	53	−30	16	
9	St. Ann's Rangers	24	2	1	21	19	68	−49	7	

Updated to match(es) played on 20 May 2014. Source: TT Pro League
Rules for classification: 1) points; 2) goal difference; 3) number of goals scored.
(C) Champions

=== Positions by round ===
Leader
2015 CFU Club Championship First round

The table lists the positions of teams after each week of matches. In order to preserve chronological evolvements, any postponed matches are not included to the round at which they were originally scheduled, but added to the full round they were played immediately afterwards. For example, if a match is scheduled for the tenth round of matches, but then postponed and played between rounds 16 and 17, it will be added to the standings for round 16.

Team ╲ Round	1	2	3	4	5	6	7	8	9	10	11	12	13	14	15	16	17	18	19	20	21	22	23	24	25	26	27
W Connection	1	1	1	1	1	1	1	1	1	1	1	1	1	1	1	1	1	1	1	1	1	1	1	1	1	1	1
Central FC	4	3	4	3	3	4	7	4	6	6	4	6	6	6	6	6	6	2	2	2	2	2	2	2	3	3	2
Defence Force	6	7	8	7	7	7	4	3	4	5	5	7	7	7	7	7	7	7	7	5	5	6	5	5	4	2	3
Point Fortin Civic	2	2	2	2	2	2	5	7	7	8	6	3	2	2	2	2	2	3	3	4	3	4	3	3	2	4	4
North East Stars	3	4	3	4	5	5	2	5	3	2	2	2	3	5	4	5	3	4	4	3	4	3	4	4	5	5	5
Caledonia AIA	8	6	6	8	6	3	6	6	5	3	3	4	5	4	3	4	5	5	5	7	7	7	7	7	6	6	6
Police	7	8	7	5	4	6	3	2	2	4	7	5	4	3	5	3	4	6	6	6	6	5	6	6	7	7	7
San Juan Jabloteh	5	5	5	6	8	8	8	8	8	7	8	8	8	8	8	8	8	8	8	8	8	8	8	8	8	8	8
St. Ann's Rangers	9	9	9	9	9	9	9	9	9	9	9	9	9	9	9	9	9	9	9	9	9	9	9	9	9	9	9

Updated to match(es) played on 20 May 2014. Source: TT Pro League

== Results ==
=== Matches 1–16 ===
Home \ Away	CAL	CEN	DEF	NES	PFC	POL	SJJ	RAN	WCO
Caledonia AIA		1–1	0–2	0–3	2–1	1–1	4–1	3–0	0–0
Central FC	0–0		3–1	1–1	3–0	1–4	4–1	6–0	2–2
Defence Force	3–2	0–2		1–3	1–0	3–1	2–0	2–3	1–1
North East Stars	2–0	1–1	1–1		0–1	3–0	0–0	1–0	0–2
Point Fortin Civic	2–1	0–0	1–3	0–0		5–0	2–0	1–0	2–1
Police	1–1	0–0	1–2	1–0	1–4		4–2	1–0	1–2
San Juan Jabloteh	0–1	1–1	0–3	0–1	3–1	1–2		6–5	1–4
St. Ann's Rangers	1–6	2–3	1–5	0–1	0–3	0–2	0–1		0–7
W Connection	0–0	1–0	2–2	2–0	2–0	1–0	3–2	2–0	

Updated to match(es) played on 2 May 2014. Source: TT Pro League
Legend: Blue = home team win; Yellow = draw; Red = away team win.

=== Matches 17–24 ===
Home \ Away	CAL	CEN	DEF	NES	PFC	POL	SJJ	RAN	WCO
Caledonia AIA				2–3	1–2	2–1	3–1		
Central FC	5–1		3–2			4–1	0–0		
Defence Force	4–0			2–0				2–1	1–4
North East Stars		2–1			0–1			1–0	1–1
Point Fortin Civic		0–2	2–3					2–1	1–1
Police			0–1	0–3	0–3		3–0		
San Juan Jabloteh			1–0	0–1	0–3			2–2	
St. Ann's Rangers	3–2	0–3				0–4			0–2
W Connection	1–1	0–3				6–1	4–0		

Updated to match(es) played on 20 May 2014. Source: TT Pro League
Legend: Blue = home team win; Yellow = draw; Red = away team win.

== Season statistics ==
=== Scoring ===
- First goal of the season: Kerry Joseph for Defence Force against Central FC, 13 September 2013.
- Last goal of the season: Marcus Joseph for Point Fortin Civic against Caledonia AIA, 20 May 2014
- First own goal of the season: Keion Goodridge (San Juan Jabloteh) for Caledonia AIA (26 October 2013)
- First penalty kick of the season: Jason Marcano (scored) for Central FC against Defence Force, 13 September 2013.
- First hat-trick of the season: Kurt Frederick (W Connection) against St. Ann's Rangers, 65', 81', 84' (14 September 2013)
- Most goals scored by one player in a match: 3 goals
  - Kurt Frederick (W Connection) against St. Ann's Rangers, 65', 80', 85' (14 September 2013)
  - Clevon McFee (St. Ann's Rangers) against San Juan Jabloteh, 15', 21', 23' (20 September 2013)
  - Kerry Baptiste (San Juan Jabloteh) against St. Ann's Rangers, 12', 50', 69' (20 September 2013)
  - Trevin Caesar (North East Stars) against Defence Force, 51', 81', 88' (8 October 2013)
  - Rundell Winchester (Central FC) against Point Fortin Civic, 21', 46', 49' (22 October 2013)
  - Keyon Edwards (Caledonia AIA) against St. Ann's Rangers, 9', 25', 46' (1 November 2013)
  - Marcus Joseph (Point Fortin Civic) against Police, 59', 76', 89' (18 January 2014)
  - Marcus Joseph (Point Fortin Civic) against St. Ann's Rangers, 6', 55', 74' (21 January 2014)
  - Willis Plaza (Central FC) against St. Ann's Rangers, 39', 61', 81' (21 February 2014)
  - Dimitrie Apai (W Connection) against Police, 53', 88', 94' (8 April 2014)
  - Willis Plaza (Central FC) against Caledonia AIA, 15', 29', 57' (8 April 2014)
  - Josimar Belgrave (Defence Force) against Caledonia AIA, 29', 69', 81' (25 April 2014)
- Widest winning margin: 7 goals
  - St. Ann's Rangers 0–7 W Connection (14 September 2013)
- Most goals in a match: 11 goals
  - San Juan Jabloteh 6–5 St. Ann's Rangers (20 September 2013)
- Most goals in one half: 6 goals
  - San Juan Jabloteh v St. Ann's Rangers (20 September 2013) 1–4 at half-time, 6–5 final.
- Most goals in one half by a single team: 5 goals
  - St. Ann's Rangers v W Connection (14 September 2013) 0–2 at half-time, 0–7 final.
  - San Juan Jabloteh v St. Ann's Rangers (20 September 2013) 1–4 at half-time, 6–5 final.

==== Top scorers ====
Rank	Player	Club	Goals
1	(Trinidad and Tobago) Marcus Joseph	Point Fortin Civic	16
2	(Trinidad and Tobago) Trevin Caesar	North East Stars	14
2	(Trinidad and Tobago) Joevin Jones	W Connection	14
2	(Trinidad and Tobago) Willis Plaza	Central FC	14
5	(Trinidad and Tobago) Josimar Belgrave	Defence Force	12
6	(Trinidad and Tobago) Devorn Jorsling	Defence Force	10
7	(Trinidad and Tobago) Kerry Baptiste	San Juan Jabloteh	8
7	(Trinidad and Tobago) Jason Marcano	Central FC	8
9	(Trinidad and Tobago) Densill Theobald	Caledonia AIA	7
10	(Trinidad and Tobago) Elijah Belgrave	Police	6
10	(Trinidad and Tobago) Jerwyn Balthazar	Defence Force	6
10	(Trinidad and Tobago) Keyon Edwards	Caledonia AIA	6
10	(Trinidad and Tobago) Jameel Perry	Police	6
10	(Trinidad and Tobago) Rundell Winchester	Central FC	6

==== Hat-tricks ====
Player	For	Against	Result	Date	Ref(s)
(Saint Lucia) Kurt Frederick	W Connection	St. Ann's Rangers*	0–7	14 September 2013	
(Trinidad and Tobago) Clevon McFee	St. Ann's Rangers	San Juan Jabloteh*	6–5	20 September 2013	
(Trinidad and Tobago) Kerry Baptiste	San Juan Jabloteh*	St. Ann's Rangers	6–5	20 September 2013	
(Trinidad and Tobago) Trevin Caesar	North East Stars	Defence Force*	1–3	8 October 2013	
(Trinidad and Tobago) Rundell Winchester	Central FC*	Point Fortin Civic	3–0	22 October 2013	
(Trinidad and Tobago) Keyon Edwards	Caledonia AIA	St. Ann's Rangers*	1–6	1 November 2013	
(Trinidad and Tobago) Marcus Joseph	Point Fortin Civic*	Police	5–0	18 January 2014	
(Trinidad and Tobago) Marcus Joseph	Point Fortin Civic	St. Ann's Rangers*	0–3	21 January 2014	
(Trinidad and Tobago) Willis Plaza	Central FC*	St. Ann's Rangers	6–0	21 February 2014	
(Suriname) Dimitrie Apai	W Connection*	Police	6–1	8 April 2014	
(Trinidad and Tobago) Willis Plaza	Central FC*	Caledonia AIA	4–1	8 April 2014	
(Trinidad and Tobago) Josimar Belgrave	Defence Force*	Caledonia AIA	4–0	25 April 2014	

- * Home team score first in result

=== Discipline ===
- First yellow card of the season: Rodell Elcock for Defence Force against Central FC, 13 September 2013.
- First red card of the season: Kern Caesar for St. Ann's Rangers against W Connection, 14 September 2013
- Most yellow cards in a single match: 7
  - W Connection 2–2 Defence Force – 3 for W Connection (Christian Viveros (2) & Juma Clarence) and 4 for Defence Force (Dave Long, Sean Narcis, Rodell Elcock & Ross Russell Jr.) (2 May 2014)
- Most red cards in a single match: 2
  - Police 0–0 Central FC – 1 for Police (Trent Noel) and 1 for Central FC (Ataullah Guerra) (31 January 2014)

== Awards ==
=== Monthly awards ===
Month	Manager of the Month		Player of the Month		Ref(s)
Month	Manager	Club	Player	Club	Ref(s)
September	(England) Terry Fenwick	Central FC	(Trinidad and Tobago) Kerry Baptiste	San Juan Jabloteh	
October	(Saint Lucia) Stuart Charles-Fevrier	W Connection	(Trinidad and Tobago) Rundell Winchester	Central FC	
November	(Saint Lucia) Stuart Charles-Fevrier	W Connection	(Trinidad and Tobago) Joevin Jones	W Connection	
December	(Saint Lucia) Stuart Charles-Fevrier	W Connection	(Trinidad and Tobago) Joevin Jones	W Connection	
January	(Trinidad and Tobago) Reynold Carrington	Point Fortin Civic	(Trinidad and Tobago) Marcus Joseph	Point Fortin Civic	
February	(England) Terry Fenwick	Central FC	(Trinidad and Tobago) Willis Plaza	Central FC	
March	(England) Terry Fenwick	Central FC	(Trinidad and Tobago) Trevin Caesar	North East Stars	
April	(England) Terry Fenwick	Central FC	(Trinidad and Tobago) Josimar Belgrave	Defence Force	
