= Hashim Arcia =

Trinidadian international footballer

Personal information
- Full name: Hashim Kareem Ricardo Arcia
- Date of birth: 8 October 1988 (age 38)
- Place of birth: Laventille, Trinidad and Tobago
- Height: 1.78 m (5 ft 10 in)
- Position: Midfielder

Team information
- Current team: Defence Force

Senior career*
Years	Team	Apps	(Gls)
2008	Ma Pau Stars		
2009	St. Ann's Rangers		
2010–2015	W Connection		
2015–	Defence Force		

International career^{‡}
2012–	Trinidad and Tobago	11	(1)
- * Club domestic league appearances and goals as of 14:32, 26 March 2018 (UTC) ‡ National team caps and goals as of 14:32, 26 March 2018 (UTC)

Hashim Kareem Ricardo Arcia (born 8 October 1988) is a Trinidadian international footballer who plays for Defence Force as a midfielder.

== Career ==
Born in Laventille, he has played club football for Ma Pau Stars, St. Ann's Rangers, W Connection and Defence Force.

He made his international debut for Trinidad and Tobago in 2012.
