= Trinidad and Tobago Charity Shield =

Digicel Charity Shield
- Founded: 2012
- Region: Trinidad and Tobago
- Teams: 2
- Current champions: W Connection (4th title)
- Most championships: W Connection (4 titles)
- Website: Charity Shield
- 2018 Digicel Charity Shield

The Trinidad and Tobago Charity Shield is the country's annual football match contested between the champions of the previous TT Pro League season and the holders of the Pro Bowl. If the Pro League champions also won the Pro Bowl, then the league runners-up provide the opposition. Often seen as a "glorified friendly", which ranks below the FA Trophy and First Citizens Cup, the fixture is a recognised football Super Cup. The match is sponsored by Digicel and is therefore officially known as the Digicel Charity Shield.

Organised by the TT Pro League, part of the proceeds from the game go towards introducing the "Read to Rise" Primary Literacy Program to a school within the winning team's community. In addition, the winning side also receives TT$10,000 to be donated to a charitable cause of choice. The inaugural charitable cash prize was given to former captain and player Jan-Michael Williams of W Connection to offset medical expenses for his fiancée Candice Worrell. Worrell was brutally assaulted while being relieved of her mobile phone in January 2012 and was comatose for nearly three months.

== History ==
The fixture was first played to open the 2012–13 season and was contested between W Connection, who were the 2011–12 champions of the TT Pro League, and Defence Force, who were the winners of the 2012 Digicel Pro Bowl. The inaugural match ended with the Savonetta Boys holding the Charity Shield after a 2–0 win over Defence Force on 8 September 2012 at Manny Ramjohn Stadium in Marabella. In 2013, the Savonetta Boys secured the Charity Shield for the second consecutive year after defeating the Teteron Boys 4–2 at the Hasely Crawford Stadium in a rematch of the previous year's Charity Shield. They won the title for the third year in a row in 2014.

== Matches ==
Key
*	Match decided in extra time
^{†}	Match decided by a penalty shootout after regulation time
^{‡}	Match decided by a penalty shootout after extra time

Season	Winner	Score	Runners–up	Venue
2012	W Connection	2–0	Defence Force	Manny Ramjohn Stadium
2013	W Connection (2)	4–2	Defence Force	Hasely Crawford Stadium
2014	W Connection (3)	1–0	Central FC	Ato Boldon Stadium
2015	Central FC (1)	1–0	W Connection	Ato Boldon Stadium
2016	Central FC (2)	2–2^{†}	Defence Force	Ato Boldon Stadium
2018	W Connection (4)	7–1	North East Stars (4)	Ato Boldon Stadium

== Results by team ==
Club	Wins	Last final won	Runners-up	Last final lost
W Connection	4	2018	1	2015
Central FC	2	2016	1	2014
Defence Force	0		3	2016
North East Stars	0		1	2018
