= Saint James, Trinidad and Tobago =

Saint James
- District
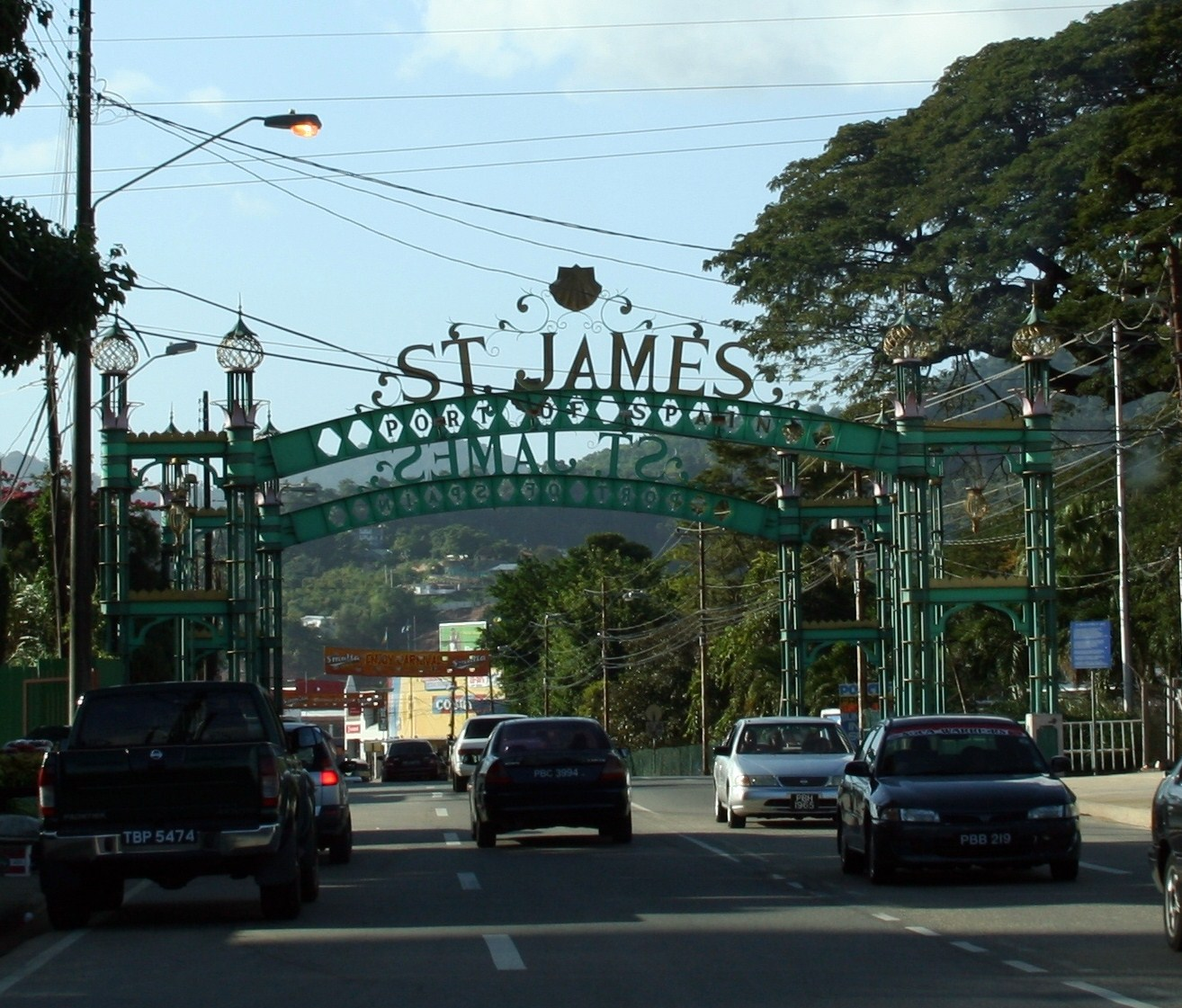
- St. James, Port of Spain, Trinidad and Tobago

- Location within Trinidad and Tobago
- Coordinates: 10°40′N 61°31′W
- Country: Trinidad and Tobago
- City: Port of Spain
- Named for: Saint James the Great

Government
  - Mayor: Joel Martinez (Mayor of Port of Spain)
  - Governing body: Port of Spain City Corporation
- Time zone: UTC−4 (AST)

Saint James is a district of Port of Spain, Trinidad and Tobago. Port of Spain's last major municipal expansion occurred in 1938, when the St. James district north of Woodbrook and west of St. Clair was incorporated into the city limits. In the late 19th century, Indian indentured labourers on nearby sugar estates established houses here, and St. James gradually became the centre of Port of Spain's Indian population, with many streets named after cities and districts in British India. Western Main Road, the area's major thoroughfare, has long been the city's main nightlife district, sometimes nicknamed "the city that never sleeps".

Long Circular Road, which curves north from Western Main Road then east to meet Maraval Road, forms part of the city boundary. Its "circle" encloses Flagstaff Hill, a small rise with the US ambassador's residence at its summit, which lends its name to an area of apartment buildings at its southern foot.

South of St. James and near the seashore at Invaders Bay is Mucurapo, a mostly residential district which also contains the city's second-largest cemetery.

== History ==
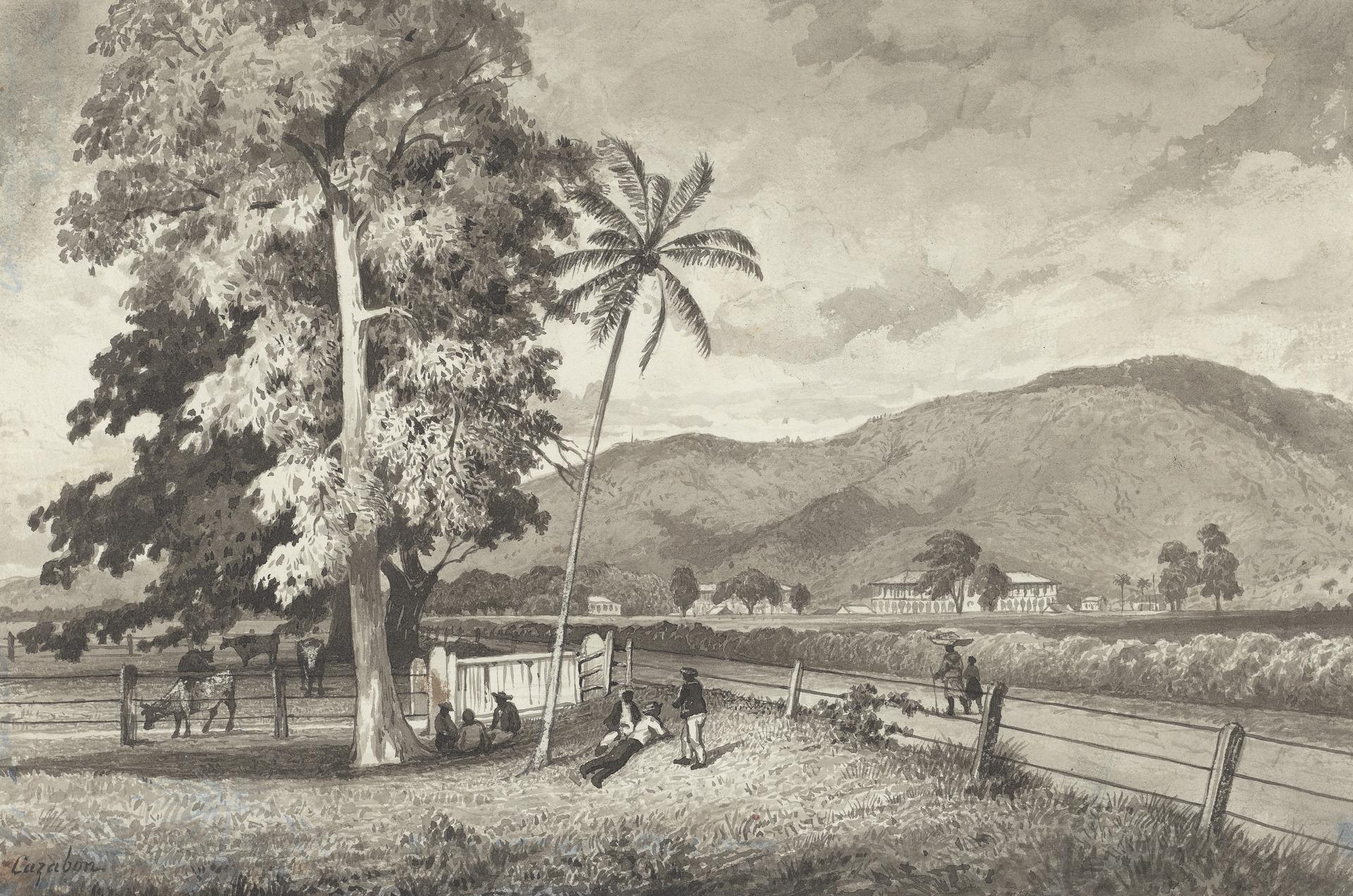
St. James, 1857 (drawing by Michel-Jean Cazabon)

St. James became part of the city of Port of Spain in 1938. Until 1992, the Civil Aviation Training Centre (CATC), now a unit of the Trinidad and Tobago Civil Aviation Authority, was located along Long Circular Road in St. James. Originally known as the Peru Estate, St. James was a sugar cane estate that harboured some of the first East Indian indentured settlers who travelled by ships like the Fatel Razak and SS Ganges from Uttar Pradesh via Kolkata.

=== Streets in St. James ===
Many of the streets of St. James were named after the "older names" of South Asian places, such as Agra, Baroda (Vadodara), Benares (Varanasi), Bengal, Bombay (Mumbai), Calcutta (Kolkata), Cawnpore (Kanpur), Delhi, Hyderabad, Lucknow, Madras (Chennai), Nepaul (Nepal), Nizam, and Patna.

There are also streets that are named after English persons or places, such as Clarence Street, where an Anglican church and school are located.

Other persons and characters are represented in the naming of streets of St. James, such as Salazzar which is located close to the Police Station, Church St., Kathleen St., Romeo St., Coronation St., Avenue First, Mucurapo Road and Ethel Street.

=== Military cemetery, crematorium, and other cemeteries ===
Within the boundaries of St. James are a military cemetery, two other cemeteries and a crematorium.

According to the Commonwealth War Graves Commission, which shows on its website photos of the military cemetery in St James and a list of the deceased persons from World Wars I and II, there are 40 casualties from World War I and II (whose names are listed at Memorial Park, off Queen's Park Savannah).

In recent times, the military cemetery has been used to bury persons who have died in the service of Trinidad and Tobago who were members of the Defense Force, or the Army or the Coast Guard, to name a few of the services which protect and serve the country.

According to "BURIAL GROUNDS, CEMETERIES & CREMATION SITES (TRINIDAD) Arranged by Ward/District", the names of the two other cemeteries which are located in St. James are as follows:

- Western Cemetery, George Cabral Circular, Terre Brulee, St. James (This cemetery can be accessed from George Cabral Street, off WMR), and Mucurapo Cemetery, Panka Street, St. James.

According to the records available to the public, there is one famous person who has been buried at Western Cemetery: former president of the Republic of Trinidad and Tobago (from 1987 to 1997) Noor Hassanali.

- Woodbrook Cemetery, Mucurapo Road, St. James. (This cemetery can be accessed off Panka Street, St. James.)

There are public records on some "eighty seven (87) persons who were buried at Mucurapo Cemetery over the years, some as early as 1936 - Ms Leonora Prince." Perhaps one of the largest number of deaths in a single year are the "Whitlocks, where the parents and 3 children who were missionaries returning to Africa died in the same year".

The Crematorium is close to the Military Cemetery, Flagstaff Villas and Long Circular Mall on Long Circular Road. It was established around the 1980s, and was one of the first formal cremation sites in the country; most people were familiar with the Hindu community's practice of burning bodies at Caroni and later at Waterloo.

== Culture ==
The St. James market which is located near to Vidale Street was rebuilt during the last twenty years.

The largest Pizza Hut in the world is located in Saint James on Tragarete Road.

== Businesses, places to visit and other tourism activities ==
=== Malls ===
St. James spans a wide geographical area stretching from the St. James Crematorium via Long Circular Road to Fatima College on Mucurapo Road in one direction and from close to the overpass by Peakes to the Police Barracks along the Western Main Road in another direction. In this area, there is at least one large mall, Long Circular Mall and several mini malls or plazas scattered throughout the district. A mini mall is classified as being either a one or a two-storey building with several small stores, each of which sells a different range of items.

The Long Circular Mall has been in existence since the late 1970s with services such as shoe repair, suitcases, shoes, flowers and books.

=== Manufacturer ===
St. James is the headquarters of the Trinidadian-based soft-drink company Solo. During the 1970s, this company was located at the corner of Western Main Road and Long Circular Road. The operations of this company were moved close to Aranguez, where the soft drinks are currently manufactured. From the Highway, the factory is visible if one is heading towards the Piarco airport.

=== Naipaul House ===
St. James was home to Nobel Prize-winner V. S. Naipaul, who lived on one of the streets prior to migrating to the United Kingdom. His home has been preserved as a historical landmark.

=== NALIS - St. James Public Library ===
The St. James Public Library is operated under the National Library and Information System Authority (NALIS) and is one of twenty five (25) public libraries which offers services to the public free of charge from Monday to Saturday every week. The St. James Public Library is located on 31 Church Street, St. James. Church Street runs parallel to the Western Main Road, starts on George Cabral Street and ends on Bombay Street. The St. James Public Library was located at the corner of Bournes Road and Western Main Road for many years and within the last five years moved to its new location on Church Street.

=== Art Gallery ===
Since the 1990s, St James has been home to Horizon's Art Gallery which is located on Mucurapo Road. This gallery offers for sale paintings from local artists such as Louison Dermot, Boscoe Holder, LeRoy Clarke, Glen Roopchand, Neil Massy. There are at least six open nights per year where new works from artists are exhibited and the public is invited to view the paintings or artwork, mingle and meet the artist.

=== The St. James Amphitheatre ===
The St. James Amphitheatre is located along the WMR and offers its services to the residents, groups and those wishing to host activities in St. James.

In June each year, WEBEAT is hosted by the St. James Community Improvement Centre.

For several years in August, the RC. Archdiocese of POS - St Mary's parish hosted their fundraising event "Toute Bagai" which was one of their main fundraising events towards the restoration of the church building at 3 George Cabral Street, St. James.

During the year, at the Amphitheatre there are several performances by various Evangelical groups which last for a week and are open to the public. Otherwise, the area is open to the public to walk in, sit on the benches or gather informally.

=== Green Spaces ===
Within St. James, there are at least two areas which may be considered 'green Spaces", they are the Ellie Mannette Park, the St. James Playground, the Grounds of the Police Barracks on the corner of Long Circular Road and Western Main Road and the grounds immediately preceding the Barracks.

The Ellie Mannette Park is located on Alfred Richards Street, just off George Cabral Street and every year is the location for at least one concert which is held shortly after Carnival which features drumming. In recent years, persons have started to offer for sale items of food and drink to persons attending the concert.

Over the last five (5) years or thereabouts, a number of the parks in the St. James area has benefitted from the donation of exercise equipment, most of which were funded by the Digicel Foundation.

=== Public transportation ===
St. James can be accessed via route taxis or maxi taxis or via the Public Transportation Service Corporation (PTSC) buses.

The Petit Valley bus starts at the Port of Spain Bus Terminal, proceeds along Independence Square, exiting through one of the side streets to Tragarete Road, through the Western Main Road, St. James, via the overpass through the Main Road in Cocorite, then to Petit Valley.

The PTSC bus which operates from Port of Spain to and from Carenage or the bus which operates from Port of Spain to and from Diego Martin passes along Mucurapo Road, St. James. These buses would have started at the Port of Spain Bus Terminal, proceeded along Wrightson Road, with a turn off which takes them to Ariapita Ave and then to Mucurapo Road, then to the Foreshore to West Mall where their routes separate. The Carenage bus continues along the Main Road to Carenage, while the Diego Martin Bus proceeds to Diego Martin.

=== Tourism activity ===
Within the last ten years or so, at least two casinos or member's clubs have opened in St. James. These have attempted to replace the recreation clubs of the 1970s that operated in bars, some of which still exist in St. James.

On one of the weekends leading up to the morning of the "Great Race", a parade of some of the boats which would have entered the Great Race would pass through St. James as part of the build up to the day. The "Great Race" is a boat race which for many years was sponsored by Carib Brewery, a subsidiary of the ANSA McAL group. The race is open to several types and sizes of boats, which allows for the creation of "classes". The race starts in the waters of Trinidad, in the Gulf of Paria, goes through the "Bocas", down the islands and ends in Store Bay in Tobago.

== Religion ==
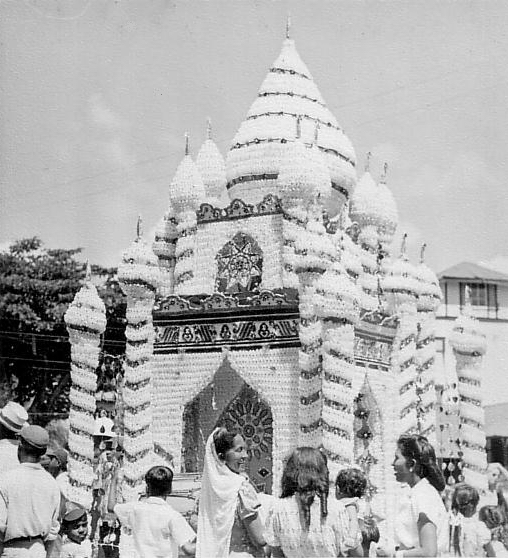
A tadjah at Hosay in St. James, 1950s

"Where Belmont's settlement was African in origin, in St. James, the city's most westerly suburb, the influence was decidedly East Indian. St. James too was a sugarcane estate, and the workers there were largely East Indians who arrived in Trinidad as indentured laborers. The streets of St. James bear witness to its earliest inhabitants with names such as Delhi, Bombay, Calcutta, Benares, Ganges, and so on.

St. James is mecca for the annual Hosay Festival, when it is possible to hear classical tassa drumming, as small effigies of mosques parade through the streets. ... Each year Hosay is celebrated in a different calendar month as the remembrance is based on a date in a lunar month which has less days than the calendar month.

There is a Muslim mosque located on the Western Main Road in St. James. There is also one located on Mucurapo Road, opposite to the Mucurapo Cemetery and in close proximity to the Mucurapo East and West schools.

A Hindu temple is located on Ethel Street, which is located in close proximity to Panka Street."

== Notable people ==
- Capildeo family
  - Rudranath Capildeo, Politician
  - Simbhoonath Capildeo, Lawyer
  - V. S. Naipaul, Writer
  - Shiva Naipaul, Novelist
- Seepersad Naipaul, Writer
- Rapper, songwriter, and singer Nicki Minaj was born in St. James and lived here until she was five years old with her grandmother before moving to New York City with her parents.
- Gary Goodridge, a kickboxer, mixed martial artist, and arm wrestler, was born in the district.
- Lennox Kilgour, a weightlifter was born in St James
- Amir Jangoo, Trinidadian and West Indies cricketer
