= Marcus Joseph =

Trinidad and Tobago footballer

Personal information
- Full name: Marcus Leric Jr. Joseph
- Date of birth: 29 April 1991 (age 35)
- Place of birth: Point Fortin, Trinidad and Tobago
- Height: 1.77 m (5 ft 10 in)
- Position: Forward

Team information
- Current team: Real Kashmir
- Number: 9

Senior career*
Years	Team	Apps	(Gls)
–2010	United Petrotrin F.C.		
2010–2012	Joe Public F.C.	21	(9)
2012–2013	T&TEC Sports Club	25	(10)
2013–2015	Point Fortin	43	(31)
2015–2017	Central F.C.	25	(15)
2017–2018	W Connection	36	(26)
2019–2020	Gokulam Kerala	24	(14)
2021–2023	Mohammedan	38	(22)
2023	Point Fortin	?	(5)
2023–2024	Al-Fotuwa SC	?	(2)
2024	Point Fortin	?	(1)
2024–2025	Morvant Caledonia United	?	(2)
2025	Dempo	9	(10)
2025–2026	Thrissur Magic	7	(3)
2026	Dempo	14	(9)
2026–	Real Kashmir		

International career^{‡}
- Trinidad and Tobago U17
2009–2011	Trinidad and Tobago U20	7	(2)
2011	Trinidad and Tobago U22	3	(0)
2012	Trinidad and Tobago U23	3	(2)
2013–2023	Trinidad and Tobago	24	(7)
- * Club domestic league appearances and goals as of 16:55, 22 May 2026 (UTC) ‡ National team caps and goals as of 27 March 2023

Marcus Leric "Lobo" Jr. Joseph (born 29 April 1991) is a Trinidadian professional footballer who plays as a forward for Indian Football League club Real Kashmir.

== Club career ==
=== Gokulam Kerala ===
In January 2019, Marcus signed for I-League side Gokulam Kerala FC. He scored his debut goal for the club in his debut match against Churchill Brothers in the 14th minute of the game which they ended up losing 3–1. As latest foreign signing of the season, he scored 7 goals in 9 matches during the 2018–19 I-League. Marcus played a crucial role in Gokulam's success in the Durand Cup 2019 as they emerged as the champions of the tournament by defeating Mohun Bagan 2–1. Marcus was named Man of the Match in the final as he scored both the goals for Gokulam. He was named as the Man of the Tournament and given the Golden Boot for his 11 goals in the campaign.

=== Mohammedan Sporting ===
On 7 July 2021, Joseph signed with Kolkata-based Mohammedan Sporting on a one-year deal. He was part of the team's 2021 Durand Cup campaign, in which he scored 5 goals as they reached to the final, defeating FC Bengaluru United 4–2. On 3 October 2021, they lost the title winning match 1–0 to ISL side FC Goa.

Joseph also appeared in the 2021 CFL Premier Division league, in which Mohammedan reached to the final, defeating United SC 1–0 through his solitary goal. On 18 November, Mohammedan clinched their 12th Calcutta Football League title after forty long years, defeating Railway FC 1–0, in which he scored the winner.

He began the 2021–22 I-League season on high and scored two braces against Aizawl and Sreenidi Deccan in their 2–0 and 3–1 win. He scored 15 goals in the season and emerged as top scorer, as his team finished runners-up after a 2–1 defeat to champion Gokulam Kerala in the final game at the Salt Lake Stadium on 14 May. He also appeared in the 2022 edition of Durand Cup, helping his team to reach semi-finals.

=== Dempo ===
In February 2025, Joseph joined I-League club Dempo. In that league season, he scored two hat-tricks in their 8–1 win against SC Bengaluru and 5–2 win against Aizawl.

=== Thrissur Magic ===
In September 2025, Joseph joined Super League Kerala club Thrissur Magic.

== International career ==
Marcus made his national team debut on 23 March 2013 against Belize where he came in as a substitute for Kenwyne Jones. The match drew 0–0.

Marcus scored his maiden international goal on 19 March 2016 against Grenada, which they drew 2–2. On 10 November 2019, during a friendly against Anguilla, Marcus scored 5 goals in the match which they won on a big margin of 15–0.

== Career statistics ==
=== Club ===
As of 11 March 2023

Club	Season	League			Cup		Other		Continental		Total	
Club	Season	Division	Apps	Goals	Apps	Goals	Apps	Goals	Apps	Goals	Apps	Goals
Gokulam Kerala	2018–19	I-League	9	7	0	0	—		—		9	7
Gokulam Kerala	2019–20	I-League	15	7	5 (Note: Appearance(s) in Durand Cup)	11	—		—		20	18
Gokulam Kerala	Gokulam Kerala total		24	14	5	11	0	0	0	0	29	25
Mohammedan	2021–22	I-League	18	15	6	5	—		—		24	20
Mohammedan	2022–23	I-League	20	7	6	1	4 (Note: Appearance(s) in Calcutta Football League)	4	—		30	12
Mohammedan	Mohammedan total		38	22	12	6	4	4	0	0	54	32
Career total			62	36	17	17	4	4	0	0	83	57

=== International goals ===
Scores and results list Trinidad and Tobago's goal tally first.

No	Date	Venue	Opponent	Score	Result	Competition
1.	19 March 2016	Kirani James Athletic Stadium, St. George's, Grenada	Grenada	2–2	2–2	Friendly
2.	10 November 2019	Ato Boldon Stadium, Couva, Trinidad and Tobago	Anguilla	2–0	15–0	Friendly
3.	10 November 2019	Ato Boldon Stadium, Couva, Trinidad and Tobago	Anguilla	6–0	15–0	Friendly
4.	10 November 2019	Ato Boldon Stadium, Couva, Trinidad and Tobago	Anguilla	7–0	15–0	Friendly
5.	10 November 2019	Ato Boldon Stadium, Couva, Trinidad and Tobago	Anguilla	8–0	15–0	Friendly
6.	10 November 2019	Ato Boldon Stadium, Couva, Trinidad and Tobago	Anguilla	11–0	15–0	Friendly
7.	2 July 2021	DRV PNK Stadium, Fort Lauderdale, United States	Montserrat	2–0	6–1	2021 CONCACAF Gold Cup qualification

== Honours ==
Gokulam Kerala

- Durand Cup: 2019

Mohammedan Sporting

- CFL Premier Division A: 2021, 2022
- Durand Cup runner-up: 2021
- I-League runner-up: 2021–22

Individual

- Durand Cup Golden Boot: 2019, and 2021
- Durand Cup Golden Ball: 2019
- I-League Golden Boot: 2021–22, 2025–26
- I-League Player of the Season: 2021–22
