= List of top TT Pro League goal scorers by season =

All-Time Top Scorers in TT Pro League (Pro League goals only)
Rank	Player	Goals
1	(Trinidad and Tobago) **Devorn Jorsling**	144
2	(Trinidad and Tobago) **Kerry Baptiste**	141
3	(Guyana) Randolph Jerome	112
4	(Trinidad and Tobago) Arnold Dwarika	103
5	(Saint Lucia) Earl Jean	90
6	(Trinidad and Tobago) **Anthony Wolfe**	79
7	(Trinidad and Tobago) Aurtis Whitley	76
8	(Trinidad and Tobago) **Andre Toussaint**	68
9	(Trinidad and Tobago) **Jason Marcano**	66
10	(Trinidad and Tobago) **Josimar Belgrave**	64
(**Bold** denotes players still playing in the TT Pro League) (Italics denotes players still playing professional football)

The following is a list of the top goal scorers in the TT Pro League, the top division of association football in Trinidad and Tobago, since its inception in 1999. In each season, the top ten goal scorers are listed with their respective number of goals and club(s). Although incomplete statistics and goal scoring records exist for the 1999 through 2003–04 seasons, a list of the known top ten goal scorers is provided. If there are six or more players tied for tenth position in a season, then the players are excluded from the list.

Arnold Dwarika and Nigel Pierre became the first Pro League goal scorers to record ten or more goals in consecutive seasons between 1999 and 2000. One season later, Rolston James joined the duo to become the third Pro League goal scorer to record ten or more goals in consecutive seasons during 2000 and 2001. However, Saint Lucian Earl Jean of W Connection became the first player to achieve ten or more goals in three consecutive seasons in 2005–07, which included a share of the Golden Boot in 2005 with 14 goals. However, following the 2010–11 season, Devorn Jorsling became the first Pro League player to score ten or more goals in four consecutive seasons from 2007 to 2011.

In addition, Nigel Pierre became the first player to finish in the top ten goal scorers in three consecutive seasons from 1999 to 2001. Kenwyne Jones later became the second player after the Trinidad and Tobago international scored 9, 18, and 12 goals respectively during the 2002–04 seasons. Moreover, Anthony Wolfe became the third to finish in the top ten scorers for three consecutive seasons from 2004 to 2006. Devorn Jorsling later became the first player to finish in the top ten goal scorers in eight consecutive seasons after having earned the achievement in the 2007–14 seasons. In addition, Jorsling also holds the milestone of having finished in the top ten goal scorers on eight occasions.

On four occasions, five of the top ten positions in league scoring were held by foreign players. The first occurrence was in 2000 when Keith Gumbs (Saint Kitts and Nevis), José Maria Manoel and Gefferson (Brazil), Earl Jean (Saint Lucia), and Kendall Velox (Saint Vincent and the Grenadines) were among the top goal scorers in the league season. On the other hand, 2010–11 saw all ten top scorers for the season originate from Trinidad and Tobago for the first time, which was repeated in 2011–12, 2013–14, and 2015–16.

== Top scorers by season ==
1999 TT Pro League
Rank	Player	Club	Goals
1	(Trinidad and Tobago) Arnold Dwarika	Joe Public	45
2	(Trinidad and Tobago) Hector Sam	San Juan Jabloteh	31
3	(Trinidad and Tobago) Angus Eve	Joe Public	22
4	(Trinidad and Tobago) Nigel Pierre	Joe Public	14
5	(Saint Lucia) Earl Jean	W Connection	11
6	(Guyana) Collie Hercules	Doc's Khelwalaas	9
7	(Trinidad and Tobago) Kerry Franklyn	Police	6
8	(Trinidad and Tobago) Aurtis Whitley	San Juan Jabloteh	5
9	(Trinidad and Tobago) Reginald Gibson	Police	4
9	(Trinidad and Tobago) Jason Scotland	Defence Force	4

2000 TT Pro League
Rank	Player	Club	Goals
1	(Trinidad and Tobago) Jason Scotland	Defence Force	22
2	(Trinidad and Tobago) Arnold Dwarika	Joe Public	15
2	(Trinidad and Tobago) Nigel Pierre	Joe Public	15
4	(Trinidad and Tobago) Sherman Phillips	Defence Force	14
5	(Saint Kitts and Nevis) Keith Gumbs	San Juan Jabloteh	13
6	(Trinidad and Tobago) Rolston James	San Juan Jabloteh	11
7	(Brazil) José Maria Manoel	W Connection	10
8	(Brazil) Gefferson	W Connection	8
9	(Saint Lucia) Earl Jean	W Connection	7
10	(Trinidad and Tobago) Hector Sam	San Juan Jabloteh	6
10	(Saint Vincent and the Grenadines) Kendall Velox	Caledonia AIA	6

2002 TT Pro League
Rank	Player	Club	Goals
1	(Trinidad and Tobago) Sean Julien	South Starworld Strikers	16
2	(Saint Lucia) Francis Lastic	W Connection	13
2	(Trinidad and Tobago) Jason Scotland	Defence Force	13
4	(Trinidad and Tobago) Cornell Glen	San Juan Jabloteh	12
4	(Trinidad and Tobago) Kerry Noray	San Juan Jabloteh	12
6	(Saint Lucia) Titus Elva	W Connection	9
6	(Trinidad and Tobago) Kenwyne Jones	Joe Public	9
6	(Saint Lucia) Valencius Joseph	Caledonia AIA	9
6	(Brazil) Luciano Sato	W Connection	9
10	(Trinidad and Tobago) Akudu Goodridge	Defence Force	8
10	(Trinidad and Tobago) Andre Toussaint	Joe Public	8

2003–04 TT Pro League
Rank	Player	Club	Goals
1	(Guyana) Randolph Jerome	San Juan Jabloteh	28
2	(Trinidad and Tobago) Cornell Glen	San Juan Jabloteh	26
3	(Trinidad and Tobago) Kenwyne Jones	W Connection	18
3	(Trinidad and Tobago) Aurtis Whitley	San Juan Jabloteh	18
5	(Trinidad and Tobago) Jerren Nixon	North East Stars	16
6	(Trinidad and Tobago) Arnold Dwarika	W Connection	15
7	(Trinidad and Tobago) Bevon Lewis	South Starworld Strikers	14
7	(Trinidad and Tobago) Devon Mitchell	San Juan Jabloteh	14
9	(Trinidad and Tobago) Kerry Baptiste	San Juan Jabloteh	12
9	(Saint Kitts and Nevis) George Isaac	W Connection	12
9	(Trinidad and Tobago) Kerry Noray	San Juan Jabloteh	12

2004 TT Pro League
Rank	Player	Club	Goals
1	(Trinidad and Tobago) Jerren Nixon	North East Stars	37
2	(Guyana) Randolph Jerome	South Starworld Strikers	18
3	(Saint Lucia) Titus Elva	W Connection	16
4	(Trinidad and Tobago) Peter Prospar	South Starworld Strikers	14
5	(Trinidad and Tobago) Kenwyne Jones	W Connection	12
6	(Trinidad and Tobago) Kevon Carter	Defence Force	10
6	(Trinidad and Tobago) Trent Noel	San Juan Jabloteh	10
6	(Trinidad and Tobago) Aurtis Whitley	San Juan Jabloteh	10
6	(Trinidad and Tobago) Anthony Wolfe	North East Stars	10
10	(Trinidad and Tobago) Odelle Armstrong	Defence Force / Joe Public	8

2005 TT Pro League
Rank	Player	Club	Goals
1	(Brazil) Gefferson	W Connection	14
1	(Saint Lucia) Earl Jean	W Connection	14
3	(Trinidad and Tobago) Josh Johnson	San Juan Jabloteh	13
4	(Trinidad and Tobago) Andre Toussaint	W Connection	12
5	(Brazil) Ronaldo Viana	W Connection	11
6	(Trinidad and Tobago) Kerry Noray	San Juan Jabloteh	10
7	(Trinidad and Tobago) Kevon Carter	Defence Force	9
7	(Trinidad and Tobago) Aurtis Whitley	San Juan Jabloteh	9
9	(Trinidad and Tobago) Noel Williams	San Juan Jabloteh	8
9	(Trinidad and Tobago) Anthony Wolfe	North East Stars	8

2006 TT Pro League
Rank	Player	Club	Goals
1	(Jamaica) Roen Nelson	Joe Public	16
1	(Trinidad and Tobago) Anthony Wolfe	San Juan Jabloteh	16
3	(Saint Lucia) Earl Jean	W Connection	13
4	(Guyana) Nigel Codrington	Caledonia AIA	11
4	(Trinidad and Tobago) Gary Glasgow	Joe Public	11
6	(Trinidad and Tobago) Kendall Jagdeosingh	Caledonia AIA	10
6	(Trinidad and Tobago) Peter Prospar	United Petrotrin	10
8	(Trinidad and Tobago) Errol McFarlane	Superstar Rangers	9
9	(Guyana) Randolph Jerome	South Starworld Strikers	8
9	(Saint Vincent and the Grenadines) Shandel Samuel	North East Stars	8

2007 TT Pro League
Rank	Player	Club	Goals
1	(Antigua and Barbuda) Peter Byers	San Juan Jabloteh	15
2	(Trinidad and Tobago) Kerry Baptiste	Joe Public	14
2	(Trinidad and Tobago) Errol McFarlane	Superstar Rangers	14
4	(Dominican Republic) Jonathan Faña	W Connection	13
4	(Trinidad and Tobago) Devorn Jorsling	Defence Force	13
4	(Trinidad and Tobago) Sylvester Teesdale	United Petrotrin	13
7	(Guyana) Randolph Jerome	North East Stars	12
8	(Saint Lucia) Earl Jean	W Connection	11
9	(Guyana) Gregory Richardson	Joe Public	10
9	(Trinidad and Tobago) Richard Roy	Defence Force	10

2008 TT Pro League
Rank	Player	Club	Goals
1	(Trinidad and Tobago) Devorn Jorsling	Defence Force	21
2	(Trinidad and Tobago) Kerry Baptiste	Joe Public	18
3	(Trinidad and Tobago) Josimar Belgrave	St. Ann's Rangers	15
4	(Jamaica) Roen Nelson	Joe Public	14
5	(Saint Vincent and the Grenadines) Kendall Velox	Caledonia AIA	12
6	(Guyana) Nigel Codrington	Caledonia AIA	11
6	(Guyana) Collie Hercules	Tobago United	11
8	(Dominican Republic) Jonathan Faña	W Connection	10
8	(Trinidad and Tobago) Trent Noel	San Juan Jabloteh	10
8	(Trinidad and Tobago) Anthony Wolfe	North East Stars	10
8	(Trinidad and Tobago) Kevon Woodley	United Petrotrin	10

2009 TT Pro League
Rank	Player	Club	Goals
1	(Trinidad and Tobago) Kerry Baptiste	Joe Public	35
2	(Trinidad and Tobago) Keyon Edwards	Caledonia AIA	16
3	(Trinidad and Tobago) Devorn Jorsling	Defence Force	13
4	(Trinidad and Tobago) Kevon Carter	Defence Force	11
5	(Trinidad and Tobago) Arnold Dwarika	United Petrotrin	10
5	(Dominican Republic) Jonathan Faña	W Connection	10
7	(Trinidad and Tobago) Anthony Wolfe	Ma Pau	9
8	(Trinidad and Tobago) Trevin Caesar	Ma Pau	8
8	(Saint Vincent and the Grenadines) Kendall Velox	Caledonia AIA	8
10	(Trinidad and Tobago) Noel Williams	San Juan Jabloteh	7

2010–11 TT Pro League
Rank	Player	Club	Goals
1	(Trinidad and Tobago) Devorn Jorsling	Defence Force	15
2	(Trinidad and Tobago) Anthony Wolfe	Ma Pau / North East Stars	12
3	(Trinidad and Tobago) Andrei Pacheco	W Connection	8
4	(Trinidad and Tobago) Kerry Baptiste	Joe Public	7
5	(Trinidad and Tobago) Hughton Hector	W Connection	6
5	(Trinidad and Tobago) Errol McFarlane	North East Stars	6
5	(Trinidad and Tobago) Trent Noel	Joe Public	6
5	(Trinidad and Tobago) Richard Roy	Defence Force	6
5	(Trinidad and Tobago) Noel Williams	San Juan Jabloteh / Police	6

2011–12 TT Pro League
Rank	Player	Club	Goals
1	(Trinidad and Tobago) Richard Roy	Defence Force	15
2	(Trinidad and Tobago) Willis Plaza	San Juan Jabloteh	11
3	(Trinidad and Tobago) Sylvester Teesdale	T&TEC	10
4	(Trinidad and Tobago) Devon Modeste	St. Ann's Rangers	9
5	(Trinidad and Tobago) Devorn Jorsling	Caledonia AIA	8
6	(Trinidad and Tobago) Jerrel Britto	W Connection	7
6	(Trinidad and Tobago) Jamal Gay	Caledonia AIA	7
6	(Trinidad and Tobago) Ataullah Guerra	Caledonia AIA	7
9	(Trinidad and Tobago) Jason Marcano	San Juan Jabloteh	5
9	(Trinidad and Tobago) Cameron Roget	St. Ann's Rangers	5
9	(Trinidad and Tobago) Ryan Stewart	Caledonia AIA / North East Stars	5

2012–13 TT Pro League
Rank	Player	Club	Goals
1	(Trinidad and Tobago) Devorn Jorsling	Defence Force	21
2	(Trinidad and Tobago) Cornell Glen	North East Stars	16
3	(Trinidad and Tobago) Kevon Carter	Defence Force	10
3	(Trinidad and Tobago) Joevin Jones	W Connection	10
5	(Trinidad and Tobago) Devon Modeste	St. Ann's Rangers	9
6	(Antigua and Barbuda) Peter Byers	Central FC	8
7	(Trinidad and Tobago) Josimar Belgrave	Defence Force	7
7	(Trinidad and Tobago) Keyon Edwards	Caledonia AIA	7
7	(Trinidad and Tobago) Kareem Joseph	Caledonia AIA	7
7	(Trinidad and Tobago) Andrei Pacheco	W Connection	7
7	(Trinidad and Tobago) Shahdon Winchester	W Connection	7

2013–14 TT Pro League
Rank	Player	Club	Goals
1	(Trinidad and Tobago) Marcus Joseph	Point Fortin Civic	16
2	(Trinidad and Tobago) Trevin Caesar	North East Stars	14
2	(Trinidad and Tobago) Joevin Jones	W Connection	14
2	(Trinidad and Tobago) Willis Plaza	Central FC	14
5	(Trinidad and Tobago) Josimar Belgrave	Defence Force	12
6	(Trinidad and Tobago) Devorn Jorsling	Defence Force	10
7	(Trinidad and Tobago) Kerry Baptiste	San Juan Jabloteh	8
7	(Trinidad and Tobago) Jason Marcano	Central FC	8
9	(Trinidad and Tobago) Densill Theobald	Caledonia AIA	7
10	(Trinidad and Tobago) Elijah Belgrave	Police	6
10	(Trinidad and Tobago) Jerwyn Balthazar	Defence Force	6
10	(Trinidad and Tobago) Keyon Edwards	Caledonia AIA	6
10	(Trinidad and Tobago) Jameel Perry	Police	6
10	(Trinidad and Tobago) Rundell Winchester	Central FC	6

2014–15 TT Pro League
Rank	Player	Club	Goals
1	(Trinidad and Tobago) Devorn Jorsling	Defence Force	21
2	(Trinidad and Tobago) Marcus Joseph	Point Fortin Civic	16
3	(Trinidad and Tobago) Ataullah Guerra	Central FC	15
4	(Trinidad and Tobago) Jerrel Britto	W Connection	14
4	(Guyana) Pernell Schultz	Caledonia AIA	14
6	(Trinidad and Tobago) Willis Plaza	Central FC	10
7	(Trinidad and Tobago) Hashim Arcia	W Connection	9
7	(Trinidad and Tobago) Kerry Baptiste	San Juan Jabloteh	9
7	(Trinidad and Tobago) Marvin Oliver	Central FC	9
10	(Trinidad and Tobago) Jamille Boatswain	Point Fortin Civic	8

2015–16 TT Pro League
Rank	Player	Club	Goals
1	(Trinidad and Tobago) Makesi Lewis	Police	21
2	(Trinidad and Tobago) Jason Marcano	Central FC	17
3	(Trinidad and Tobago) Marcus Joseph	Central FC	15
4	(Trinidad and Tobago) Devon Modeste	Club Sando	14
5	(Trinidad and Tobago) Nathan Lewis	San Juan Jabloteh	13
6	(Trinidad and Tobago) Jerwyn Balthazar	Defence Force	12
6	(Trinidad and Tobago) Kareem Freitas	Police	12
8	(Trinidad and Tobago) Jamal Gay	San Juan Jabloteh	11
8	(Trinidad and Tobago) Jomal Williams	W Connection	11
10	(Trinidad and Tobago) Kerry Baptiste	North East Stars	10

== Appearances in top scorers by season ==
=== Multiple appearances ===
Rank	Player	Total	Seasons
1	(Trinidad and Tobago) Devorn Jorsling	8	2007, 2008, 2009, 2010–11, 2011–12, 2012–13, 2013–14, 2014–15
1	(Trinidad and Tobago) Kerry Baptiste	8	2003–04, 2007, 2008, 2009, 2010–11, 2013–14, 2014–15, 2015–16
3	(Trinidad and Tobago) Anthony Wolfe	6	2004, 2005, 2006, 2008, 2009, 2010–11
4	(Saint Lucia) Earl Jean	5	1999, 2000, 2005, 2006, 2007
5	(Trinidad and Tobago) Kevon Carter	4	2004, 2005, 2009, 2012–13
5	(Trinidad and Tobago) Arnold Dwarika	4	1999, 2000, 2003–04, 2009
5	(Guyana) Randolph Jerome	4	2003–04, 2004, 2006, 2007
5	(Trinidad and Tobago) Aurtis Whitley	4	1999, 2003–04, 2004, 2005

=== Appearances by club ===
Rank	Club	Total
1	W Connection	31
2	San Juan Jabloteh	30
3	Defence Force	24
4	Joe Public	17
4	Morvant Caledonia United	17
6	North East Stars	13
7	Central FC	9
8	Police	7
9	St. Ann's Rangers	6
10	South Starworld Strikers	5
11	United Petrotrin	4
12	Ma Pau	3
12	Point Fortin Civic	3
14	Club Sando	1
14	Doc's Khelwalaas	1
14	Tobago United	1
14	T&TEC	1
Total		173

=== Appearances by nationality ===
Rank	Country	Total
1	Trinidad and Tobago	132
2	Guyana	10
3	Saint Lucia	9
4	Brazil	5
5	Saint Vincent and the Grenadines	4
6	Dominican Republic	3
7	Antigua and Barbuda	2
7	Jamaica	2
7	Saint Kitts and Nevis	2
Total		169

== See also ==
- TT Pro League Golden Boot
- List of TT Pro League players with 100 or more goals
- List of TT Pro League seasons
