= List of TT Pro League managers =

This is a list of managers in the TT Pro League, which began league play in 1999. The list includes individuals who have managed a club while they were in the TT Pro League. The Pro League represents the highest division in the Trinidad and Tobago football league pyramid and consists of nine professional football clubs.

There have been eight managers that have won the Pro League. In addition, four foreign managers have secured the Pro League championship, which comprise two English (Terry Fenwick, San Juan Jabloteh, three wins) and (Ricky Hill, San Juan Jabloteh, one win), a Guyanese (James McLean, North East Stars, one win), and a Saint Lucian (Stuart Charles-Fevrier, W Connection, five wins). Michael McComie became the second Trinidad and Tobago manager to win the league, when he won the title with Joe Public in 2006. Derek King later became the third Trinidad and Tobago manager to claim the league title in 2009, also with Joe Public. In fact, King became the youngest manager to win the league title at 29 years, 198 days.

Only Ronald La Forest has managed three different Pro League teams including San Juan Jabloteh, Joe Public, and Ma Pau. Eight managers have managed two different clubs in the Pro League. Jamaal Shabazz managed briefly at Joe Public before moving to Morvant Caledonia United. Michael McComie has managed Joe Public and Ma Pau. Michael Maurice previously managed South Starworld Strikers before becoming manager of Police in 2007. Peter Granville managed Doc's Khelwalaas before guiding Tobago United during the club's entire eight year history. Angus Eve served as caretaker manager to San Juan Jabloteh before arriving at Sangre Grande with North East Stars in 2012–13. Everald Cummings was the manager of South Starworld Strikers before moving to North East Stars. Terry Fenwick managed San Juan Jabloteh on three separate occasions before accepting the position at Central FC.

Stuart Charles-Fevrier has the longest active tenure as manager in the Pro League having been W Connection's manager since June 2004. Ross Russell of Defence Force has the second longest tenure after becoming the Teteron Boys' manager on 8 April 2009. However, Jamaal Shabazz holds the record for longest tenure in the Pro League having served as the manager of Morvant Caledonia United for 12 years and 236 days before departing to become co-manager of the Trinidad and Tobago national team.

== Managers ==
Managers are listed from their appointment to their respective Pro League club, whether in a permanent or temporary role. Some of these managers were appointed as caretaker managers prior to being given a permanent position. However, caretaker managers are listed only when they have managed the team for at least one match in that period. In addition, the dates of appointment and departure of managers may fall outside the club's period in the TT Pro League.

Key
**Bold**	Current manager in the TT Pro League
(c)	Served as caretaker manager of club
†	Manager led club to TT Pro League championship

Manager	Nationality	Date of birth	Club	Appointed	Departure	Time as manager
Floyd Windsor	Trinidad and Tobago		Arima Fire	5 April 2000	16 January 2004	4 years, 286 days
Jamaal Shabazz	Trinidad and Tobago	22 November 1963	Morvant Caledonia United	5 April 2000	27 November 2012	12 years, 236 days
Jerry Moe (c)	Trinidad and Tobago		Morvant Caledonia United	27 November 2012	30 June 2013	215 days
**Jamaal Shabazz**	Trinidad and Tobago	22 November 1963	Morvant Caledonia United	1 July 2013		12 years, 181 days
Graham Rix	England	23 October 1957	Central FC	13 August 2012	21 December 2012	130 days
Terry Fenwick	England	17 November 1969	Central FC	3 January 2013	16 May 2014	1 year, 133 days
**Zoran Vraneš**	Serbia	14 September 1950	Central FC	10 July 2014		11 years, 172 days
Hutson Charles	Trinidad and Tobago	22 September 1965	Defence Force	4 May 2003	29 September 2004	1 year, 148 days
Kerry Jamerson	Trinidad and Tobago	25 July 1967	Defence Force	29 September 2004	2 April 2006	1 year, 185 days
Anthony Barrington	Trinidad and Tobago	16 May 1962	Defence Force	2 April 2006	8 November 2006	220 days
Kerry Jamerson	Trinidad and Tobago	25 July 1967	Defence Force	8 February 2007	18 December 2008	1 year, 314 days
**Ross Russell**	Trinidad and Tobago	18 December 1967	Defence Force^{†}	8 April 2009		16 years, 265 days
Ivan Persaud	Guyana	20 August 1962	Doc's Khelwalaas	31 March 1999	4 April 2000	1 year, 4 days
Peter Granville	Trinidad and Tobago		Doc's Khelwalaas	5 April 2000	28 November 2001	1 year, 237 days
Leroy DeLeon	Trinidad and Tobago	7 February 1948	FC South End	9 May 2009	17 November 2009	192 days
Dick Furlonge	Trinidad and Tobago		FC South End	24 April 2010	10 August 2011	1 year, 109 days
Arthur Brown	Trinidad and Tobago		FUTGOF	31 March 1999	28 February 2000	334 days
Jamaal Shabazz	Trinidad and Tobago	22 November 1963	Joe Public	31 March 1999	1 March 2000	336 days
Kenny Joseph	Trinidad and Tobago		Joe Public	1 March 2000	30 September 2000	213 days
Clayton Morris (c)	Trinidad and Tobago		Joe Public	1 October 2000	9 January 2001	100 days
Zoran Vraneš	Serbia	14 September 1950	Joe Public	9 January 2001	14 May 2002	1 year, 125 days
Ronald La Forest	Trinidad and Tobago		Joe Public	14 May 2002	18 January 2004	1 year, 251 days
Michael McComie	Trinidad and Tobago	22 April 1972	Joe Public^{†}	5 June 2004	23 February 2007	2 years, 263 days
Clemente Hernández	Cuba	23 November 1961	Joe Public	23 February 2007	14 July 2007	141 days
Michael McComie	Trinidad and Tobago	22 April 1972	Joe Public	15 July 2007	31 July 2008	1 year, 16 days
Keith Griffith	Barbados		Joe Public	12 August 2008	1 November 2008	81 days
Derek King	Trinidad and Tobago	12 April 1980	Joe Public^{†}	3 November 2008	2 February 2011	2 years, 91 days
Rajesh Latchoo	Trinidad and Tobago	8 June 1984	Joe Public	2 February 2011	10 August 2011	189 days
Ronald La Forest	Trinidad and Tobago		Ma Pau	5 April 2008	17 January 2009	287 days
Ubirajara Veiga Da Silva	Brazil		Ma Pau	21 January 2009	2 April 2009	71 days
Michael McComie	Trinidad and Tobago	22 April 1972	Ma Pau	8 April 2009	15 July 2011	2 years, 98 days
Lloyd Solomon	Trinidad and Tobago		North East Stars	21 April 2002	13 November 2002	206 days
James McLean	Guyana		North East Stars^{†}	4 May 2003	20 September 2005	2 years, 139 days
Jerren Nixon (c)	Trinidad and Tobago	25 June 1973	North East Stars	20 September 2005	10 December 2005	81 days
Miguel Hackett	Trinidad and Tobago	9 April 1965	North East Stars	4 February 2006	31 August 2006	208 days
Everald Cummings (c)	Trinidad and Tobago	24 August 1948	North East Stars	1 September 2006	29 January 2007	150 days
James McLean	Guyana		North East Stars	11 February 2007	18 December 2007	310 days
Kenrick Elie	Trinidad and Tobago		North East Stars	10 March 2008	5 May 2008	56 days
Clint Marcelle	Trinidad and Tobago	9 November 1968	North East Stars	20 May 2008	10 September 2008	113 days
Miguel Hackett	Trinidad and Tobago	9 April 1965	North East Stars	16 September 2008	16 January 2009	122 days
Rod Underwood	United States		North East Stars	16 April 2010	25 June 2010	70 days
Shurland David	Trinidad and Tobago	18 August 1974	North East Stars	1 July 2010	26 September 2011	1 year, 87 days
Kevin Jeffrey (c)	Trinidad and Tobago	4 October 1974	North East Stars	27 September 2011	25 October 2011	28 days
Emerson Alcântara	Brazil	27 August 1970	North East Stars	25 October 2011	13 June 2012	232 days
**Angus Eve**	Trinidad and Tobago	23 February 1973	North East Stars	13 June 2012		13 years, 199 days
**Reynold Carrington**	Trinidad and Tobago		Point Fortin Civic	10 September 2013		12 years, 110 days
Michael Maurice	Trinidad and Tobago	11 November 1957	Police	14 April 2007	13 November 2007	213 days
Richard De Coteau	Trinidad and Tobago	24 March 1960	Police	29 January 2009	20 November 2009	295 days
Anthony Marshall	Trinidad and Tobago		Police	24 April 2010	20 November 2010	210 days
Kelvin Jones	Trinidad and Tobago	2 January 1962	Police	20 November 2010	29 August 2012	1 year, 283 days
**Richard Hood**	Trinidad and Tobago	12 December 1964	Police	29 August 2012		13 years, 122 days
Ronald La Forest	Trinidad and Tobago		San Juan Jabloteh	31 March 1999	31 December 2000	1 year, 275 days
Terry Fenwick	England	17 November 1969	San Juan Jabloteh^{†}	28 February 2001	15 January 2003	1 year, 321 days
Ricky Hill	England	3 March 1959	San Juan Jabloteh^{†}	9 May 2003	24 March 2004	320 days
Steve Rutter	England	14 October 1962	San Juan Jabloteh	1 June 2004	31 October 2004	152 days
Angus Eve (c)	Trinidad and Tobago	23 February 1973	San Juan Jabloteh	31 October 2004	7 November 2004	7 days
Michael Grayson (c)	Trinidad and Tobago		San Juan Jabloteh	9 April 2005	22 April 2005	13 days
Terry Fenwick	England	17 November 1969	San Juan Jabloteh^{†}	22 April 2005	17 April 2009	3 years, 360 days
Earl Jean	Saint Lucia	9 October 1971	San Juan Jabloteh	18 April 2009	26 November 2009	222 days
Terry Fenwick	England	17 November 1959	San Juan Jabloteh	26 November 2009	29 March 2011	1 year, 123 days
Earl Carter	Trinidad and Tobago	20 December 1955	San Juan Jabloteh	1 July 2011	30 June 2012	365 days
**Keith Jeffrey**	Trinidad and Tobago	4 October 1974	San Juan Jabloteh	10 September 2013		12 years, 110 days
Desmond Bailey	Antigua and Barbuda		South Starworld Strikers	14 April 2002	6 November 2002	206 days
Everald Cummings	Trinidad and Tobago	24 August 1948	South Starworld Strikers	18 March 2003	9 April 2005	2 years, 22 days
Michael Maurice	Trinidad and Tobago	11 November 1957	South Starworld Strikers	22 March 2006	8 November 2006	231 days
Anthony Streete	Trinidad and Tobago	31 January 1959	St. Ann's Rangers	8 April 2006	29 February 2012	5 years, 327 days
Dean Pacheco	Trinidad and Tobago	5 August 1972	St. Ann's Rangers	2 March 2012	30 June 2013	1 year, 120 days
Gilbert Bateau	Trinidad and Tobago		St. Ann's Rangers	1 July 2013	20 March 2014	262 days
Anthony Streete	Trinidad and Tobago	31 January 1959	St. Ann's Rangers	20 March 2014	22 July 2014	122 days
**Jason Spence**	Trinidad and Tobago		St. Ann's Rangers	22 July 2014		11 years, 160 days
Peter Granville	Trinidad and Tobago		Tobago United	4 May 2003	16 September 2010	7 years, 135 days
Dexter Cyrus	Trinidad and Tobago	27 December 1969	T&TEC	9 September 2011	11 September 2012	1 year, 2 days
Jefferson George	Trinidad and Tobago		T&TEC	11 September 2012	10 November 2012	60 days
Dexter Cyrus	Trinidad and Tobago	27 December 1969	T&TEC	22 November 2012	16 August 2013	267 days
Brian Williams	Trinidad and Tobago	21 October 1961	United Petrotrin	11 February 2003	12 September 2008	5 years, 185 days
Leon Carpette (c)	Trinidad and Tobago	10 April 1950	United Petrotrin	12 September 2008	18 December 2008	97 days
Marcos Tinoco	Brazil		United Petrotrin	21 February 2009	8 January 2010	321 days
Stuart Charles-Fevrier	Saint Lucia	19 January 1959	W Connection^{†}	31 March 1999	15 May 2003	4 years, 45 days
Leroy Spann (c)	Trinidad and Tobago	26 June 1953	W Connection	23 May 2003	31 May 2004	1 year, 8 days
**Stuart Charles-Fevrier**	Saint Lucia	19 January 1959	W Connection^{†}	1 June 2004		21 years, 211 days

=== Managers by club ===
Rank	Club	Total
1	North East Stars	12
2	Joe Public	11
3	San Juan Jabloteh	9
4	Police	5
5	Defence Force	4
5	St. Ann's Rangers	4
7	Central FC	3
7	Ma Pau	3
7	South Starworld Strikers	3
7	United Petrotrin	3
11	Morvant Caledonia United	2
11	Doc's Khelwalaas	2
11	FC South End	2
11	T&TEC	2
11	W Connection	2
16	Arima Fire	1
16	Point Fortin Civic	1
16	FUTGOF	1
16	Tobago United	1
Total		72

=== Managers by nationality ===
Rank	Country	Total
1	Trinidad and Tobago	44
2	England	4
3	Brazil	3
4	Guyana	2
4	Saint Lucia	2
6	Antigua and Barbuda	1
6	Barbados	1
6	Cuba	1
6	Serbia	1
6	United States	1
Total		60
