= Dwayne Jack =

Trinidad and Tobago footballer

Personal information
- Date of birth: 19 January 1980 (age 46)
- Place of birth: Charlotteville, Trinidad and Tobago
- Position: Defender

Senior career*
| Years | Team | Apps | (Gls) |
| 2004–2006 | Tobago United | | |
| 2005 | → North East Stars (loan) | | |
| 2007–2008 | San Juan Jabloteh | | |
| 2009–2011 | Tobago United | | |
| 2011–2014 | Tobago Phoenix 1976 | | |

International career
| 2005–2008 | Trinidad and Tobago | 11 | (1) |
Medal record
San Juan Jabloteh
| Winner | TT Pro League | 2007 |
| Winner | TT Pro League | 2008 |
- * Club domestic league appearances and goals

Dwayne Jack (born 19 January 1980) is a retired Trinidadian football player.

== Career statistics ==
=== International ===
As of matches played 2009.

| National team | Year | Apps | Goals |
|---|---|---|---|
| Trinidad and Tobago | 2005 | 1 | 0 |
| Trinidad and Tobago | 2006 | 1 | 0 |
| Trinidad and Tobago | 2007 | 8 | 1 |
| Trinidad and Tobago | 2008 | 1 | 0 |
| Total | | 11 | 1 |

=== International goals ===
Scores and results list Trinidad and Tobago's goal tally first.

| No | Date | Venue | Opponent | Score | Result | Competition |
|---|---|---|---|---|---|---|
| 1. | 31 January 2007 | Estadio Rommel Fernández, Panama City, Panama | Panama | 1–1 | 1–2 | Friendly |
