= Joseph Wilson =

Joseph or Joe Wilson may refer to:

== Politicians and government officials ==
=== United States ===
- Joe Wilson (born 1947), U.S. Representative from South Carolina
- Joseph C. Wilson (1949–2019), United States ambassador and husband of Valerie Plame Wilson
- Joseph G. Wilson (1826–1873), U.S. Representative from Oregon
- Joseph Franklin Wilson (1901–1968), U.S. Representative from Texas
- Joe N. Wilson (1922–2015), American politician from Iowa
- Joseph Harvey Wilson (1810–1884), American politician from North Carolina
- Joseph S. Wilson, U.S. Treasury and Department of the Interior official
- Joseph T. Wilson (died 1891), American politician, journalist, and author

=== United Kingdom ===
- Joe Wilson (British politician) (born 1937), member of the European Parliament for North Wales (1989–99)
- Joseph Havelock Wilson (1859–1929), British trade union leader and politician

=== New Zealand ===
- Joseph Vivian Wilson (1894–1977), New Zealand ambassador to France

== Sportsmen ==
=== Football ===
- Joe Wilson (footballer, born 1861) (1861–1952), played at outside left for Stoke, Aston Villa and West Bromwich Albion
- Joe Wilson (footballer, born 1883) (1883–1945), played at centre half for Blackburn Rovers, Brighton & Hove Albion and Millwall
- Joe Wilson (footballer, born 1909) (1909–1984), played at inside right for Newcastle United and Brighton & Hove Albion
- Joe Wilson (footballer, born 1911) (1911–1996), played at right back for Southend United, Brentford, Barnsley and others
- Joe Wilson (footballer, born 1937) (1937–2015), played at full back for Nottingham Forest and Wolverhampton Wanderers
- Joe Wilson (1920s and 1930s footballer), played for Gillingham and Walsall
- Joseph Wilson (football manager), known as "Bill" Wilson, a Guyanese professional football manager
- Joe Wilson (Australian footballer) (1870–1912), Australian rules footballer and cricketer
- Joseph Wilson (footballer) (born 1939), Ghanaian footballer
- Joe Wilson (American football) (born 1950), American football running back

=== Other sports ===
- Joseph Peter Wilson (1935–2019), American Olympic cross-country skier
- Joseph Wilson (Australian cricketer) (1869–1938), Australian cricketer
- Joseph Wilson (English cricketer) (born 1965), English cricketer
- Joe Wilson (sportscaster) (1911–1983), American sports announcer
- Joe Wilson (rugby league), Australian rugby league player

== Arts ==
- Joe Wilson (Geordie singer) (1841–1875), Geordie dialect singer, songwriter
- Joe Wilson (musician) (born 1973), member of the British band Sneaker Pimps
- Joe Lee Wilson (1935–2011), American gospel-influenced jazz singer
- Joe Wilson (director) (born 1964), American film director and producer

== Religion ==
- Joseph Bearwalker Wilson (1942–2004), shamanist and founder of the 1734 tradition of witchcraft
- Joseph Ruggles Wilson (1822–1903), theologian and father of Woodrow Wilson

== Business ==
- Joseph C. Wilson (entrepreneur) (1909–1971), founder of the Xerox Corporation
- Joseph Lapsley Wilson (1844–1928), American railroad executive, author and horticulturalist
- J. W. Wilson (Joseph William Wilson, 1829–1898), English engineer

== Fiction ==
- Joe Wilson (character), a fictional character appearing in numerous Henry Lawson short stories
  - Joe Wilson (miniseries), a 1988 mini series about the character
- Jericho (DC Comics), DC Comics character whose real name is Joseph Wilson
