= 2008 TT Pro League =

TT Pro League
- Season: 2008
- Champions: San Juan Jabloteh; 4th Pro League title 4th T&T title
- CFU Club Championship: San Juan Jabloteh; W Connection
- Matches: 150
- Goals: 454 (3.03 per match)
- Top goalscorer: Devorn Jorsling (21 goals)
- Biggest home win: Joe Public 6–0 Rangers (6 November 2008)
- Biggest away win: Tobago United 0–10 Defence Force (23 October 2008)
- Highest scoring: Tobago United 0–10 Defence Force (23 October 2008)

The 2008 TT Pro League was the tenth season of the TT Pro League, the Trinidad and Tobago professional league for association football clubs, since its establishment in 1999. A total of ten teams took part in the league, with San Juan Jabloteh the defending champions. The season began on 5 April and ended on 29 November, with the conclusion of the Lucozade Sport Big Six.

Ma Pau were admitted as a new club into the league and would be based in Woodbrook. After one season upon their return to the Pro League, Police withdrew with the intention of returning for the 2009 season. The Superstar Rangers decided to change the name of the club to St. Ann's Rangers to increase community awareness.

The first goal of the season was scored by San Juan Jabloteh's Peter Byers against Ma Pau in the sixth minute of the first game on 5 April. Devorn Jorsling, who also scored on the first day, went on to claim the Golden Boot with a season high 21 goals. Josimar Belgrave of St. Ann's Rangers scored the first hat-trick of the season against Tobago United on 3 May, having scored a season high four goals in the match.

Following the regular season, San Juan Jabloteh, W Connection, Caledonia AIA, Joe Public, North East Stars, and United Petrotrin all qualified for the Lucozade Sport Big Six. However, Jabloteh and W Connection were 20 points clear of third place, Caledonia AIA, before the competition began. The league was won on the final day of the season, when the San Juan Kings used a draw over W Connection to defend their crown and win their fourth Pro League title. Having finished as the league champion and runner-up, San Juan Jabloteh and W Connection both qualified for the 2009 CFU Club Championship.

After the season, North East Stars withdrew from the Pro League, citing the state of their home ground, Sangre Grande Recreational Ground, for the past few years as the cause to sit out the 2009 season. The Sangre Grande Boys stated that they fully intend to return to the Pro League following needed repairs and improvements to the ground.

== Changes from the 2007 season ==
The following changes were made since the 2007 season:

- There were a number of changes to the clubs competing in the 2008 season.
  - Ma Pau, based in Woodbrook were admitted into the league as an expansion club.
  - Police withdrew from the league after commissioner Trevor Paul issued a directive to ban lawmen from participating in sporting activities.
  - Superstar Rangers changed the name of the club to St. Ann's Rangers to increase community awareness.
  - San Juan Jabloteh signed a three-year partnership with Celtic of the Scottish Premier League.
    - The agreement allows the two sides to develop greater commercial value, youth and coach development, and create opportunities for the transfer of players.
  - WASA, the 2007 National Super League champions, applied for Pro League admission. The club was not admitted as they were unable to meet Pro League standards.

== Teams ==
=== Team summaries ===
Location of the 2008 TT Pro League teams

Note: Flags indicate national team as has been defined under FIFA eligibility rules. Players may hold more than one non-FIFA nationality.

Team	Location	Stadium	Capacity	Manager	Captain
Caledonia AIA	Morvant/Laventille	Larry Gomes Stadium	10,000	(Trinidad and Tobago) Jamaal Shabazz	(Saint Lucia) Sheldon Emmanuel
Defence Force	Chaguaramas	Hasely Crawford Stadium	27,000	(Trinidad and Tobago) Kerry Jamerson	(Trinidad and Tobago) Anton Pierre
Joe Public	Arouca	Marvin Lee Stadium	6,000	(Trinidad and Tobago) Derek King	(Trinidad and Tobago) Dale Saunders
Ma Pau	Woodbrook	Hasely Crawford Stadium	27,000	(Trinidad and Tobago) Ronald La Forest	(Trinidad and Tobago) Lorne Joseph
North East Stars	Sangre Grande	Sangre Grande Ground	7,000	(Trinidad and Tobago) Miguel Hackett	(Trinidad and Tobago) Anthony Haynes
San Juan Jabloteh	San Juan	Hasely Crawford Stadium	27,000	(England) Terry Fenwick	(Trinidad and Tobago) Trent Noel
St. Ann's Rangers	San Juan	Hasely Crawford Stadium	27,000	(Trinidad and Tobago) Anthony Streete	(Trinidad and Tobago) Errol McFarlane
Tobago United	Bacolet	Dwight Yorke Stadium	7,500	(Trinidad and Tobago) Peter Granville	(Antigua and Barbuda) George Dublin
United Petrotrin	Pointe-à-Pierre	Palo Seco Velodrome	10,000	(Trinidad and Tobago) Leon Carpette (c)	(Trinidad and Tobago) Romauld Aguillera
W Connection	Point Lisas	Manny Ramjohn Stadium	10,000	(Saint Lucia) Stuart Charles-Fevrier	(Saint Lucia) Elijah Joseph

=== Managerial changes ===
Team	Outgoing manager	Manner of departure	Date of vacancy	Table	Incoming manager	Date of appointment	Table
Ma Pau	Expansion team				(Trinidad and Tobago) Ronald La Forest	5 April 2008	Pre-season
North East Stars	(Guyana) James McLean	Resigned	18 December 2007	6th (2007)	(Trinidad and Tobago) Kenrick Elie	10 March 2008	Pre-season
North East Stars	(Trinidad and Tobago) Kenrick Elie	Sacked	5 May 2008	10th	(Trinidad and Tobago) Clint Marcelle	20 May 2008	10th
Joe Public	(Trinidad and Tobago) Michael McComie	End of caretaker contract	31 July 2008	5th	(Barbados) Keith Griffith	12 August 2008	5th
North East Stars	(Trinidad and Tobago) Clint Marcelle	Sacked	10 September 2008	7th	(Trinidad and Tobago) Miguel Hackett	16 September 2008	7th
United Petrotrin	(Trinidad and Tobago) Brian Williams	Sacked	12 September 2008	6th	(Trinidad and Tobago) Leon Carpette	12 September 2008	6th
Joe Public	(Barbados) Keith Griffith	Resigned	1 November 2008	4th	(Trinidad and Tobago) Derek King	3 November 2008	4th

== Regular season ==
=== Competition table ===
Pos	Team	Pld	W	D	L	GF	GA	GD	Pts	Qualification
1	W Connection (A)	27	19	4	4	53	18	+35	61	Qualification for 2008 Lucozade Sport Big Six
2	San Juan Jabloteh (A)	27	19	4	4	55	23	+32	61	Qualification for 2008 Lucozade Sport Big Six
3	Caledonia AIA (A)	27	12	5	10	42	38	+4	41	Qualification for 2008 Lucozade Sport Big Six
4	Joe Public (A)	27	12	4	11	47	36	+11	40	Qualification for 2008 Lucozade Sport Big Six
5	North East Stars (Note: Team disbanded after season.) (A)	27	12	4	11	36	34	+2	40	Qualification for 2008 Lucozade Sport Big Six
6	United Petrotrin (A)	27	10	7	10	34	42	−8	37	Qualification for 2008 Lucozade Sport Big Six
7	St. Ann's Rangers	27	9	7	11	50	52	−2	34	
8	Defence Force	27	7	7	13	41	47	−6	28	
9	Ma Pau	27	7	4	16	33	63	−30	25	
10	Tobago United	27	3	4	20	25	63	−38	13	

Updated to match(es) played on 8 November 2008. Source: TT Pro League
Rules for classification: 1) points; 2) goal difference; 3) number of goals scored.
(A) Advance to a further round

=== Results ===
==== Matches 1–18 ====
Home \ Away	CAL	DEF	JOE	MAP	NES	SJJ	RAN	TBU	UPE	WCO
Caledonia AIA		2–2	1–2	3–2	2–1	1–2	1–0	2–1	1–4	1–0
Defence Force	1–2		1–1	1–2	0–1	0–2	1–4	3–1	1–1	0–2
Joe Public	1–0	5–0		3–1	2–1	2–2	0–3	3–0	3–1	0–1
Ma Pau	1–5	2–3	0–4		3–0	0–2	0–5	2–2	2–1	0–5
North East Stars	1–0	1–0	2–0	2–1		0–1	2–2	1–2	1–3	0–1
San Juan Jabloteh	1–2	3–1	3–0	3–1	2–0		5–0	3–3	3–0	1–0
St. Ann's Rangers	3–3	1–2	2–2	1–1	2–2	1–1		2–0	4–1	0–1
Tobago United	0–3	1–1	0–3	1–2	0–1	0–1	1–5		3–0	1–2
United Petrotrin	1–1	2–0	1–2	3–0	1–1	1–0	1–0	2–0		1–0
W Connection	1–1	1–0	1–0	4–1	0–2	2–2	2–2	4–1	5–0	

Updated to match(es) played on 9 September 2008. Source: TT Pro League
Legend: Blue = home team win; Yellow = draw; Red = away team win.

==== Matches 19–27 ====
Home \ Away	CAL	DEF	JOE	MAP	NES	SJJ	RAN	TBU	UPE	WCO
Caledonia AIA		1–2	2–1			1–3			3–1	
Defence Force			1–0	0–0		2–4				1–4
Joe Public				2–4		1–2	6–0	2–1	2–2	
Ma Pau	2–1				1–4			0–2	1–1	
North East Stars	0–1	3–3	2–0						2–1	
San Juan Jabloteh				2–1	2–0			1–0	4–0	0–1
St. Ann's Rangers	2–1	1–5		1–2	1–3	3–0				
Tobago United	1–1	0–10			2–3		1–2			0–2
United Petrotrin		0–0					2–1	2–1		1–1
W Connection	2–0		2–0	2–1	1–0		6–2			

Updated to match(es) played on 8 November 2008. Source: TT Pro League
Legend: Blue = home team win; Yellow = draw; Red = away team win.

== Lucozade Sport Big Six ==
=== Competition table ===
Pos	Team	Pld	W	D	L	GF	GA	GD	Pts
1	San Juan Jabloteh (O)	5	4	1	0	8	2	+6	13
2	W Connection	5	3	2	0	6	3	+3	11
3	North East Stars	5	2	1	2	10	9	+1	7
4	Caledonia AIA	5	1	2	2	6	7	−1	5
5	Joe Public	5	0	2	3	3	6	−3	2
6	United Petrotrin	5	0	2	3	5	11	−6	2

Updated to match(es) played on 29 November 2008. Source: TT Pro League
Rules for classification: 1) points; 2) goal difference; 3) number of goals scored.
(O) Play-off winners

=== Results ===
Round 1
Home team	Score	Away team
Joe Public	0–0	North East Stars
Caledonia AIA	0–0	W Connection
San Juan Jabloteh	2–0	United Petrotrin

Round 2
Home team	Score	Away team
San Juan Jabloteh	1–0	Caledonia AIA
North East Stars	2–3	W Connection
United Petrotrin	1–1	Joe Public

Round 3
Home team	Score	Away team
North East Stars	3–2	Caledonia AIA
United Petrotrin	1–2	W Connection
San Juan Jabloteh	2–1	Joe Public

Round 4
Home team	Score	Away team
Joe Public	0–1	W Connection
North East Stars	1–3	San Juan Jabloteh
United Petrotrin	2–2	Caledonia AIA

Round 5
Home team	Score	Away team
W Connection	0–0	San Juan Jabloteh
North East Stars	4–1	United Petrotrin
Joe Public	1–2	Caledonia AIA

== League table ==
Pos	Team	Pld	W	D	L	GF	GA	GD	Pts	Qualification
1	San Juan Jabloteh (C)	32	23	5	4	63	25	+38	74	2009 CFU Club Championship Second round
2	W Connection	32	22	6	4	59	21	+38	72	2009 CFU Club Championship First round
3	North East Stars	32	14	5	13	46	43	+3	47	Team disbanded after season (Note: Following the season, North East Stars withdrew from the Pro League for the 2009 season.)
4	Caledonia AIA	32	13	7	12	48	45	+3	46	
5	Joe Public	32	12	6	14	50	42	+8	42	
6	United Petrotrin	32	10	9	13	39	53	−14	39	
7	St. Ann's Rangers	27	9	7	11	50	52	−2	34	
8	Defence Force	27	7	7	13	41	47	−6	28	
9	Ma Pau	27	7	4	16	33	63	−30	25	
10	Tobago United	27	3	4	20	25	63	−38	13	

Updated to match(es) played on 29 November 2008. Source: TT Pro League
Rules for classification: 1) points; 2) goal difference; 3) number of goals scored.
(C) Champions

=== Positions by round ===
Leader
2009 CFU Club Championship First round
Qualification to 2008 Lucozade Sport Big Six
Team disbanded after season

The table lists the positions of teams after each week of matches. In order to preserve chronological evolvements, any postponed matches are not included to the round at which they were originally scheduled, but added to the full round they were played immediately afterwards. For example, if a match is scheduled for the tenth round of matches, but then postponed and played between rounds 16 and 17, it will be added to the standings for round 16.

Team ╲ Round	1	2	3	4	5	6	7	8	9	10	11	12	13	14	15	16	17	18	19	20	21	22	23	24	25	26	27	28	29	30	31	32
San Juan Jabloteh	2	2	2	2	2	2	1	1	1	1	1	1	1	1	1	1	1	1	1	2	2	2	2	2	2	2	2	1	1	1	1	1
W Connection	1	4	3	5	3	4	5	2	2	2	2	2	2	2	2	2	2	2	2	1	1	1	1	1	1	1	1	2	2	2	2	2
North East Stars	9	5	7	8	10	7	7	7	7	7	7	7	7	7	7	7	7	7	7	5	5	5	5	5	5	5	5	5	5	3	3	3
Caledonia AIA	4	3	6	4	5	3	4	3	3	3	3	3	3	4	4	4	4	4	4	3	3	3	3	3	3	3	3	3	4	5	4	4
Joe Public	7	6	4	3	4	5	3	5	5	5	5	5	5	5	5	5	5	5	5	4	4	4	4	4	4	4	4	4	3	4	5	5
United Petrotrin	3	1	1	1	1	1	2	4	4	4	4	4	4	6	6	6	6	6	6	6	6	6	6	6	6	6	6	6	6	6	6	6
St. Ann's Rangers	5	7	8	10	6	6	6	6	6	6	6	6	6	3	3	3	3	3	3	7	7	7	7	7	7	7	7	7	7	7	7	7
Defence Force	6	8	5	6	7	8	9	8	8	8	8	8	8	8	8	8	8	8	8	8	8	8	8	8	8	8	8	8	8	8	8	8
Ma Pau	8	9	9	9	8	9	8	9	9	9	9	9	9	9	9	9	9	9	9	9	9	9	9	9	9	9	9	9	9	9	9	9
Tobago United	10	10	10	7	9	10	10	10	10	10	10	10	10	10	10	10	10	10	10	10	10	10	10	10	10	10	10	10	10	10	10	10

Updated to match(es) played on 29 November 2008. Source: TT Pro League

== Season statistics ==
=== Scoring ===
- First goal of the season: Peter Byers for San Juan Jabloteh against Ma Pau, (5 April 2008).
- Last goal of the season: Sean Cooper for North East Stars against United Petrotrin, (29 November 2008).
- First own goal of the season: Karlon Murray (San Juan Jabloteh) for Ma Pau, (5 April 2008).
- First penalty kick of the season: Kennedy Hinkson (scored) for United Petrotrin against North East Stars (5 April 2008).
- First hat-trick of the season: Josimar Belgrave (St. Ann's Rangers) against Tobago United, 19', 33', 49', 90' (3 May 2008).
- Most goals scored by one player in a match: 4 goals
  - Josimar Belgrave (St. Ann's Rangers) against Tobago United, 19', 33', 49', 90' (3 May 2008).
- Widest winning margin: 10 goals
  - Tobago United 0–10 Defence Force (23 October 2008)
- Most goals in a match: 10 goals
  - Tobago United 0–10 Defence Force (23 October 2008)
- Most goals in one half: 5 goals
  - Tobago United v Defence Force (23 October 2008) 0–5 at half-time, 0–10 final.
  - W Connection v St. Ann's Rangers (30 October 2008) 3–0 at half-time, 6–2 final.
  - North East Stars v Defence Force (1 November 2008) 2–3 at half-time, 3–3 final.
- Most goals in one half by a single team: 5 goals
  - Tobago United v Defence Force (23 October 2008) 0–5 at half-time, 0–10 final.

==== Top scorers ====
Rank	Player	Club	Goals
1	(Trinidad and Tobago) Devorn Jorsling	Defence Force	21
2	(Trinidad and Tobago) Kerry Baptiste	Joe Public	18
3	(Trinidad and Tobago) Josimar Belgrave	St. Ann's Rangers	15
4	(Jamaica) Roen Nelson	Joe Public	14
5	(Saint Vincent and the Grenadines) Kendall Velox	Caledonia AIA	12
6	(Guyana) Nigel Codrington	Caledonia AIA	11
6	(Guyana) Collie Hercules	Tobago United	11
8	(Dominican Republic) Jonathan Faña	W Connection	10
8	(Trinidad and Tobago) Trent Noel	San Juan Jabloteh	10
8	(Trinidad and Tobago) Anthony Wolfe	North East Stars	10
8	(Trinidad and Tobago) Kevon Woodley	United Petrotrin	10

==== Hat-tricks ====
Player	For	Against	Result	Date	Ref(s)
(Trinidad and Tobago) Josimar Belgrave^{4}	St. Ann's Rangers	Tobago United*	1–5	3 May 2008	
(Trinidad and Tobago) Sean Cooper	North East Stars	Ma Pau*	1–4	23 September 2008	
(Trinidad and Tobago) Devorn Jorsling	Defence Force	Tobago United*	0–10	23 October 2008	
(Jamaica) Roen Nelson	Joe Public*	St. Ann's Rangers	6–0	6 November 2008	
(Jamaica) Roen Nelson	Joe Public	Ma Pau*	0–4	11 November 2008	

- * Home team score first in result
- ^{4} Player scored four goals

=== Discipline ===
- First red card of the season: Michael Woods for Caledonia AIA against St. Ann's Rangers, (5 April 2008).

== Awards ==
=== Annual awards ===
The 2008 TT Pro League awards distribution took place on Super Friday, 8 May 2009, prior to the 2009 season's opening match at Marvin Lee Stadium.

Having won the Pro League and Big Six titles, San Juan Jabloteh was named the Team of the Year for the second time. Having led the San Juan Kings to their fourth league championship, Terry Fenwick won his first Manager of the Year award. Midfielder Trent Noel was named the Player of the Year; receiving the award for the first in his career. After recording 21 goals, Defence Force's Devorn Jorsling received the Golden Boot. In addition, North East Stars was named the Most Disciplined Team of the Year. Neal Brizan, won his second consecutive Referee of the Year award and Boris Punch was named the Match Commissioner of the Year.

Award	Winner
Player of the Year	(Trinidad and Tobago) Trent Noel (San Juan Jabloteh)
Manager of the Year	(England) Terry Fenwick (San Juan Jabloteh)
Golden Boot	(Trinidad and Tobago) Devorn Jorsling (Defence Force)
Team of the Year	San Juan Jabloteh
Most Disciplined Team of the Year	North East Stars
Referee of the Year	Neal Brizan
Assistant Referee of the Year	Joseph Pierre
Match Commissioner of the Year	Boris Punch
