= 2007 TT Pro League =

TT Pro League
- Season: 2007
- Champions: San Juan Jabloteh; 3rd Pro League title 3rd T&T title
- CFU Club Championship: San Juan Jabloteh; Joe Public
- Matches: 150
- Goals: 432 (2.88 per match)
- Top goalscorer: Peter Byers (15 goals)
- Biggest home win: W Connection 7–0 Police (15 September 2007)
- Biggest away win: Tobago United 1–7 Caledonia AIA (30 October 2007)
- Highest scoring: Tobago United 6–2 Police (31 July 2007); Tobago United 1–7 Caledonia AIA (30 October 2007); North East Stars 7–1 Police (13 November 2007)

The 2007 TT Pro League was the ninth season of the TT Pro League, the Trinidad and Tobago professional league for association football clubs, since its establishment in 1999. A total of ten teams took part in the league, with Joe Public the defending champions. The season began on 14 April and ended on 18 December, with the conclusion of the Lucozade Sport Big Six.

== Changes from the 2006 season ==
The following changes were made since the 2006 season:

- The reserve league was established to provide valuable playing time to develop non-starters on team rosters with a league of their own to show scouts their skills on the field.
- There were a number of changes to the clubs competing in the 2007 season.
  - South Starworld Strikers, based in San Fernando, withdrew from the league following the 2006 season.
  - Police, were admitted back into the Pro League following their absence since 2001.

== Teams ==
=== Team summaries ===
Location of the 2007 TT Pro League teams

Note: Flags indicate national team as has been defined under FIFA eligibility rules. Players may hold more than one non-FIFA nationality.

Team	Location	Stadium	Capacity	Manager	Captain
Caledonia AIA	Morvant/Laventille	Larry Gomes Stadium	10,000	(Trinidad and Tobago) Jamaal Shabazz	(Saint Lucia) Sheldon Emmanuel
Defence Force	Chaguaramas	Hasely Crawford Stadium	27,000	(Trinidad and Tobago) Kerry Jamerson	(Trinidad and Tobago) Anton Pierre
Joe Public	Arouca	Marvin Lee Stadium	6,000	(Trinidad and Tobago) Michael McComie	(Trinidad and Tobago) Dale Saunders
North East Stars	Sangre Grande	Sangre Grande Ground	7,000	(Guyana) James McLean	(Trinidad and Tobago) Glenton Wolfe
Police	Saint James	Hasely Crawford Stadium	27,000	(Trinidad and Tobago) Michael Maurice	(Trinidad and Tobago) Dwight Elliot
San Juan Jabloteh	San Juan	Hasely Crawford Stadium	27,000	(England) Terry Fenwick	(Trinidad and Tobago) Trent Noel
Superstar Rangers	San Juan	Hasely Crawford Stadium	27,000	(Trinidad and Tobago) Anthony Streete	(Trinidad and Tobago) Errol McFarlane
Tobago United	Bacolet	Dwight Yorke Stadium	7,500	(Trinidad and Tobago) Peter Granville	(Antigua and Barbuda) George Dublin
United Petrotrin	Pointe-à-Pierre	Palo Seco Velodrome	10,000	(Trinidad and Tobago) Brian Williams	(Trinidad and Tobago) Perry Martin
W Connection	Point Lisas	Manny Ramjohn Stadium	10,000	(Saint Lucia) Stuart Charles-Fevrier	(Saint Lucia) Earl Jean

=== Managerial changes ===
Team	Outgoing manager	Manner of departure	Date of vacancy	Table	Incoming manager	Date of appointment	Table
Police	Re-admitted team				(Trinidad and Tobago) Michael Maurice	14 April 2007	Pre-season
Defence Force	(Trinidad and Tobago) Anthony Barrington	Retired	8 November 2006	7th (2006)	(Trinidad and Tobago) Kerry Jamerson	8 February 2007	Pre-season
North East Stars	(Trinidad and Tobago) Everald Cummings	End of caretaker contract	29 January 2007	5th (2006)	(Guyana) James McLean	11 February 2007	Pre-season
Joe Public	(Trinidad and Tobago) Michael McComie	Resigned	23 February 2007	1st (2006)	(Cuba) Clemente Hernández	23 February 2007	Pre-season
Joe Public	(Cuba) Clemente Hernández	Sacked	14 July 2007	3rd	(Trinidad and Tobago) Michael McComie	15 July 2007	3rd

== Regular season ==
=== Competition table ===
Pos	Team	Pld	W	D	L	GF	GA	GD	Pts	Qualification
1	San Juan Jabloteh (A)	27	16	7	4	42	27	+15	55	Qualification for 2007 Lucozade Sport Big Six
2	Caledonia AIA (A)	27	16	6	5	43	23	+20	54	Qualification for 2007 Lucozade Sport Big Six
3	Joe Public (A)	27	15	4	8	45	22	+23	49	Qualification for 2007 Lucozade Sport Big Six
4	W Connection (A)	27	12	8	7	51	28	+23	44	Qualification for 2007 Lucozade Sport Big Six
5	Defence Force^{1} (A)	27	12	6	9	40	37	+3	42	Qualification for 2007 Lucozade Sport Big Six
6	North East Stars (A)	27	10	10	7	37	25	+12	40	Qualification for 2007 Lucozade Sport Big Six
7	United Petrotrin	27	10	5	12	38	35	+3	35	
8	Superstar Rangers	27	9	5	13	48	42	+6	32	
9	Police	27	5	1	21	29	79	−50	16	Team disbanded after season (Note: Following the season, Police withdrew from the Pro League for the 2008 season.)
10	Tobago United	27	3	2	22	25	80	−55	11	

Updated to match(es) played on 18 December 2007. Source: TT Pro League
Rules for classification: 1) points; 2) goal difference; 3) number of goals scored.
(A) Advance to a further round

=== Results ===
==== Matches 1–18 ====
Home \ Away	CAL	DEF	JOE	NES	POL	SJJ	RAN	TBU	UPE	WCO
Caledonia AIA		3–2	2–0	0–0	4–0	3–0	1–0	2–1	1–0	0–0
Defence Force	1–0		2–4	2–1	2–0	0–1	3–3	0–0	3–0	1–4
Joe Public	0–1	3–0		1–0	3–1	1–2	3–0	3–1	2–2	0–0
North East Stars	1–1	0–0	0–0		3–2	1–1	0–1	1–0	1–1	0–0
Police	1–3	1–2	1–0	0–3		0–2	3–4	0–0	0–5	4–3
San Juan Jabloteh	2–0	1–1	1–0	2–1	1–3		2–0	3–2	2–2	1–1
Superstar Rangers	0–1	1–2	1–3	3–1	4–1	2–3		5–0	0–1	2–2
Tobago United	2–4	1–3	0–3	1–4	0–2	1–5	3–2		2–0	1–2
United Petrotrin	2–0	0–2	0–1	2–0	1–3	1–3	1–1	4–0		0–2
W Connection	1–2	2–1	0–2	2–3	3–1	0–0	2–0	6–0	1–2	

Updated to match(es) played on 22 November 2007. Source: TT Pro League
Legend: Blue = home team win; Yellow = draw; Red = away team win.

==== Matches 19–27 ====
Home \ Away	CAL	DEF	JOE	NES	POL	SJJ	RAN	TBU	UPE	WCO
Caledonia AIA		2–1	1–0			1–1	1–1			
Defence Force				0–2		1–2	1–1	3–2		2–0
Joe Public	2–0			1–1	2–1	1–0			1–2	
North East Stars	0–0				7–1		1–0			0–0
Police	1–3	0–1				1–2	0–4			
San Juan Jabloteh							1–0	3–0	1–0	0–0
Superstar Rangers			0–3			4–0		5–0	2–1	2–4
Tobago United	1–7		1–5	0–2	6–2				0–1	
United Petrotrin	0–1	2–2		2–3	4–0					2–1
W Connection	3–1		2–1		7–0			3–0		

Updated to match(es) played on 18 December 2007. Source: TT Pro League
Legend: Blue = home team win; Yellow = draw; Red = away team win.

== Lucozade Sport Big Six ==
=== Competition table ===
Pos	Team	Pld	W	D	L	GF	GA	GD	Pts
1	W Connection (O)	5	3	2	0	10	4	+6	11
2	Defence Force	5	2	3	0	5	3	+2	9
3	Joe Public	5	2	2	1	5	3	+2	8
4	San Juan Jabloteh	5	2	1	2	5	4	+1	7
5	North East Stars	5	1	1	3	5	10	−5	4
6	Caledonia AIA	5	0	1	4	4	10	−6	1

Updated to match(es) played on 18 December 2007. Source: TT Pro League
Rules for classification: 1) points; 2) goal difference; 3) number of goals scored.
(O) Play-off winners

=== Results ===
Round 1
Home team	Score	Away team
North East Stars	0–2	Joe Public
W Connection	2–1	San Juan Jabloteh
Defence Force	1–0	Caledonia AIA

Round 2
Home team	Score	Away team
W Connection	1–1	Defence Force
Caledonia AIA	1–3	North East Stars
San Juan Jabloteh	0–1	Joe Public

Round 3
Home team	Score	Away team
W Connection	3–0	North East Stars
San Juan Jabloteh	0–0	Defence Force
Caledonia AIA	1–1	Joe Public

Round 4
Home team	Score	Away team
Defence Force	1–0	Joe Public
W Connection	3–1	Caledonia AIA
North East Stars	0–2	San Juan Jabloteh

Round 5
Home team	Score	Away team
Defence Force	2–2	North East Stars
San Juan Jabloteh	2–1	Caledonia AIA
Joe Public	1–1	W Connection

== League table ==
Pos	Team	Pld	W	D	L	GF	GA	GD	Pts	Qualification
1	San Juan Jabloteh (C)	32	18	8	6	47	31	+16	62	2007 CFU Club Championship First round
2	Joe Public	32	17	6	9	50	25	+25	57	2007 CFU Club Championship First round
3	W Connection	32	15	10	7	61	32	+29	55	
4	Caledonia AIA	32	16	7	9	47	33	+14	55	
5	Defence Force	32	14	9	9	45	40	+5	51	
6	North East Stars	32	11	11	10	42	35	+7	44	
7	United Petrotrin	27	10	5	12	38	35	+3	35	
8	Superstar Rangers	27	9	5	13	48	42	+6	32	
9	Police	27	5	1	21	29	79	−50	16	Team disbanded after season (Note: Following the season, Police withdrew from the Pro League for the 2008 season.)
10	Tobago United	27	3	2	22	25	80	−55	11	

Updated to match(es) played on 18 December 2007. Source: TT Pro League
Rules for classification: 1) points; 2) goal difference; 3) number of goals scored.
(C) Champions

=== Positions by round ===
Leader
2007 CFU Club Championship First round
Qualification to 2007 Lucozade Sport Big Six
Team disbanded after season

The table lists the positions of teams after each week of matches. In order to preserve chronological evolvements, any postponed matches are not included to the round at which they were originally scheduled, but added to the full round they were played immediately afterwards. For example, if a match is scheduled for the tenth round of matches, but then postponed and played between rounds 16 and 17, it will be added to the standings for round 16.

Team ╲ Round	1	2	3	4	5	6	7	8	9	10	11	12	13	14	15	16	17	18	19	20	21	22	23	24	25	26	27	28	29	30	31	32
San Juan Jabloteh	10	8	6	3	3	3	2	2	2	2	1	1	1	1	1	1	1	2	2	2	1	2	2	1	1	2	1	1	2	2	1	1
Joe Public	5	2	1	1	1	1	3	3	3	3	2	2	3	3	3	3	3	4	4	4	4	4	4	3	3	3	3	3	1	1	2	2
W Connection	3	4	5	6	6	5	4	4	4	4	4	4	4	4	5	5	5	5	5	5	5	5	5	5	5	4	4	4	4	4	4	3
Caledonia AIA	4	5	2	2	2	2	1	1	1	1	3	3	2	2	2	2	2	1	1	1	2	1	1	2	2	1	2	2	3	3	3	4
Defence Force	7	9	8	8	9	9	9	8	8	6	7	6	5	5	4	4	4	3	3	3	3	3	3	4	4	5	5	5	5	5	5	5
North East Stars	1	3	4	5	8	8	7	7	7	5	5	5	6	6	6	6	6	6	6	7	7	8	7	6	6	6	6	6	6	6	6	6
United Petrotrin	6	7	10	7	5	6	6	6	6	8	8	8	7	7	8	7	7	7	7	6	6	6	6	7	7	7	7	7	7	7	7	7
Superstar Rangers	2	1	3	4	4	4	5	5	5	7	6	7	8	8	7	8	8	8	8	8	8	7	8	8	8	8	8	8	8	8	8	8
Police	8	6	7	10	7	7	8	9	9	9	9	10	10	9	9	9	9	9	9	9	9	9	9	9	9	9	9	9	9	9	9	9
Tobago United	9	10	9	9	10	10	10	10	10	10	10	9	9	10	10	10	10	10	10	10	10	10	10	10	10	10	10	10	10	10	10	10

Updated to match(es) played on 18 December 2007. Source: TT Pro League

== Season statistics ==
=== Scoring ===
- First goal of the season: Nigel Codrington for Caledonia AIA against San Juan Jabloteh, (14 April 2007).
- Last goal of the season: Conrad Smith for Caledonia AIA against San Juan Jabloteh, (18 December 2007).
- First own goal of the season: Michael Edwards (Defence Force) for Joe Public, (25 August 2007).
- First penalty kick of the season: Kareem Joseph (scored) for Caledonia AIA against Tobago United (26 June 2007).
- First hat-trick of the season: Kendall Jagdeosingh (North East Stars) against Tobago United, 56', 59', 87' (14 April 2007).
- Most goals scored by one player in a match: 3 goals
  - Kendall Jagdeosingh (North East Stars) against Tobago United, 56', 59', 87' (14 April 2007).
  - Errol McFarlane (Superstar Rangers) against Tobago United, 42', 81', 82' (17 April 2007).
  - Peter Byers (San Juan Jabloteh) against Tobago United), 17', 35', 45' (3 July 2007).
  - Errol McFarlane (Superstar Rangers) against Police, 34', 42', 75' (8 July 2007).
  - Peter Prospar (United Petrotrin) against Police, 51', 61', 68' (10 July 2007).
  - Kayode Legall (Tobago United) against Police, 62', 75', 90' (31 July 2007).
  - Hayden Tinto (Caledonia AIA) against Tobago United, 56', 59', 70' (30 October 2007).
- Widest winning margin: 7 goals
  - W Connection 7–0 Police (15 September 2007)
- Most goals in a match: 8 goals
  - Tobago United 6–2 Police (31 July 2007)
  - Tobago United 1–7 Caledonia AIA (30 October 2007)
  - North East Stars 7–1 Police (13 November 2007)
- Most goals in one half: 6 goals
  - Tobago United v San Juan Jabloteh (3 July 2007) 1–5 at half-time, 1–5 final.
  - Police v W Connection (28 July 2007) 1–0 at half-time, 4–3 final.
  - Tobago United v Police (31 July 2007) 2–0 at half-time, 6–2 final.
  - Tobago United v Joe Public (15 September 2007) 0–0 at half-time, 1–5 final.
  - North East Stars v Police (13 November 2007) 2–0 at half-time, 7–1 final.
- Most goals in one half by a single team: 5 goals
  - Tobago United v San Juan Jabloteh (3 July 2007) 1–5 at half-time, 1–5 final.
  - Tobago United v Joe Public (15 September 2007) 0–0 at half-time, 1–5 final.
  - W Connection v Police (15 September 2007) 2–0 at half-time, 7–0 final.
  - Tobago United v Caledonia AIA (30 October 2007) 1–2 at half-time, 1–7 final.
  - North East Stars v Police (13 November 2007) 2–0 at half-time, 7–1 final.

==== Top scorers ====
Rank	Player	Club	Goals
1	(Antigua and Barbuda) Peter Byers	San Juan Jabloteh	15
2	(Trinidad and Tobago) Kerry Baptiste	Joe Public	14
2	(Trinidad and Tobago) Errol McFarlane	Superstar Rangers	14
4	(Dominican Republic) Jonathan Faña	W Connection	13
4	(Trinidad and Tobago) Devorn Jorsling	Defence Force	13
4	(Trinidad and Tobago) Sylvester Teesdale	United Petrotrin	13
7	(Guyana) Randolph Jerome	North East Stars	12
8	(Saint Lucia) Earl Jean	W Connection	11
9	(Guyana) Gregory Richardson	Joe Public	10
9	(Trinidad and Tobago) Richard Roy	Defence Force	10

==== Hat-tricks ====
Player	For	Against	Result	Date	Ref(s)
(Trinidad and Tobago) Kendall Jagdeosingh	North East Stars*	Tobago United	4–1	14 April 2007	
(Trinidad and Tobago) Errol McFarlane	Superstar Rangers*	Tobago United	5–0	17 April 2007	
(Antigua and Barbuda) Peter Byers	San Juan Jabloteh	Tobago United*	5–1	3 July 2007	
(Trinidad and Tobago) Errol McFarlane	Superstar Rangers	Police*	4–3	8 July 2007	
(Trinidad and Tobago) Peter Prosper	United Petrotrin	Police*	5–0	10 July 2007	
(Trinidad and Tobago) Kayode Legall	Tobago United*	Police	6–2	31 July 2007	
(Trinidad and Tobago) Hayden Tinto	Caledonia AIA	Tobago United*	7–1	30 October 2007	

- * Home team score first in result

== Awards ==
=== Round awards ===
Round	Player of the Round	Round's Statline
Round One	(Trinidad and Tobago) Marvin Oliver (Caledonia AIA)	9 GP, 3 G, Caledonia AIA 6-2-1 in Round One
Round Two	(Trinidad and Tobago) Anton Pierre (Defence Force)	9 GP, 4 SHO, Defence Force 7-1-1 in Round Two
Round Three	(Trinidad and Tobago) Keon Daniel (United Petrotrin)	9 GP, 3 G, United Petrotrin 4-1-4 in Round Three

=== Annual awards ===
The 2007 TT Pro League awards distribution took place on 5 April 2008, prior to the 2008 season's opening match at Hasely Crawford Stadium.

The majority of the individual and team awards were shared by the league champion, San Juan Jabloteh, and the league's top trophy winner, W Connection. Marvin Oliver of Caledonia AIA was named the league's Player of the Year and Best Midfielder for the season. Each being Oliver's first recognition of his career. Peter Byers from Antigua and Barbuda received the Golden Boot and was named the Best Forward for leading the league with 15 goals. Stuart Charles-Fevrier became the first two-time winner of Manager of the Year after leading W Connection to two more cup trophies, a league third-place finish, and the Team of the Year award. Other individual awards were received by Jabloteh's Cleon John and W Connection's Elijah Joseph for Best Goalkeeper and Best Defender, respectively. The remaining team award was also won by the Savonetta Boys for the Most Disciplined Team of the Year. FIFA international referee, Neal Brizan, won the Referee of the Year, whereas Norris Ferguson won the Match Commissioner of the Year.

Award	Winner
Player of the Year	(Trinidad and Tobago) Marvin Oliver (Caledonia AIA)
Manager of the Year	(Saint Lucia) Stuart Charles-Fevrier (W Connection)
Best Goalkeeper	(Trinidad and Tobago) Cleon John (San Juan Jabloteh)
Best Defender	(Saint Lucia) Elijah Joseph (W Connection)
Best Midfielder	(Trinidad and Tobago) Marvin Oliver (Caledonia AIA)
Best Forward	(Antigua and Barbuda) Peter Byers (San Juan Jabloteh)
Golden Boot	(Antigua and Barbuda) Peter Byers (San Juan Jabloteh)
Team of the Year	W Connection
Most Disciplined Team of the Year	W Connection
Referee of the Year	Neal Brizan
Assistant Referee of the Year	Joseph Taylor
Match Commissioner of the Year	Norris Ferguson
