= List of TT Pro League players with 100 or more goals =

The following is a list of TT Pro League players with 100 or more goals, since the inception of the TT Pro League. Since its formation at the start of the 1999 season, four players have managed to accrue 100 or more goals in the TT Pro League.

In the 2008 season, Randolph Jerome became the first player to score 100 Pro League goals while playing for North East Stars. Arnold Dwarika later became the second player to reach the century with a goal from a penalty kick on 1 August 2009. Kerry Baptiste became the third player to score 100 Pro League goals after the Joe Public winger scored 35 goals during the 2009 season en route to winning the Pro League Golden Boot. The most recent player to reach the century is Devorn Jorsling, who scored a pair of goals on 2 March 2013 in a 3–0 win over St. Ann's Rangers.

== Players ==
Key
**Bold**	Currently playing in the TT Pro League
Italics	Player still playing professional football

Rank	Player	Club(s)	Goals
1	(Trinidad and Tobago) **Devorn Jorsling**	Caledonia AIA (8), **Defence Force** (136)	144
2	(Trinidad and Tobago) **Kerry Baptiste**	Joe Public (74), T&TEC (2), San Juan Jabloteh (52), **North East Stars** (13)	141
3	(Guyana) Randolph Jerome	Doc's Khelwalaas (34), W Connection (2), South Starworld Strikers (24), Caledonia AIA (5), North East Stars (47)	112
4	(Trinidad and Tobago) Arnold Dwarika	W Connection (18), Joe Public (75), United Petrotrin (10)	103

== See also ==
- Top TT Pro League goal scorers by season
