= Guyana national football team =

Guyana
- Nickname: Golden Jaguars
- Association: Guyana Football Federation (GFF)
- Confederation: CONCACAF (North America)
- Sub-confederation: CFU (Caribbean)
- Head coach: Marco Bonofiglio
- Captain: Elliot Bonds
- Most caps: Walter Moore (77)
- Top scorer: Omari Glasgow (27)
- Home stadium: Providence Stadium
- FIFA code: GUY
First colours	Second colours	Third colours

FIFA ranking
- Current: 140 ▲2 (18 November 2026)
- Highest: 86 (November 2010)
- Lowest: 185 (February 2004)

First international
- British Guiana 1–4 Trinidad and Tobago (British Guiana; 21 July 1905)

Biggest win
- Guyana 14–0 Anguilla (St. John's, Antigua and Barbuda; 16 April 1998)

Biggest defeat
- Suriname 9–0 British Guiana (Netherlands Antilles; 17 February 1952); Suriname 9–0 British Guiana (Aruba; 9 February 1953); Guyana 0–9 Mexico (Santa Ana, United States; 2 December 1987)

CONCACAF Gold Cup
- Appearances: 2 (first in 2019)
- Best result: Group stage (2019)

The Guyana national football team represents Guyana in men's international football, which is governed by the Guyana Football Federation founded in 1902. It has been an affiliate member of FIFA since 1968, and although it is a country geographically located in South America, it has been an affiliate member of CONCACAF since 1961 (as British Guiana until its independence in 1966). Regionally, it is an affiliate member of CFU in the Caribbean Zone.

Guyana has never participated in the FIFA World Cup, but has qualified once for the CONCACAF Gold Cup in 2019, and has also participated once in League A and three times in League B of the CONCACAF Nations League. Regionally, the team finished fourth place in the 1991 Caribbean Cup.

== History ==
=== British Guiana (1905–1966) ===
Guyana (then British Guiana) played its first international football match on 21 July 1905, a 4–1 defeat against neighboring British colony Trinidad and Tobago. Its next match was almost 16 years later, on 28 January 1921, a 2–1 away victory against Suriname. The two teams met again in Suriname on 27 August 1923, in the Martinez Shield, and this time the home side won 2–1. British Guiana regularly participated in the Martinez Shield between 1923 and 1933, winning the tournament in 1929, 1931, and 1932.

It played two more matches against Trinidad and Tobago in Suriname in 1937, both resulting in defeats: 3–0 and 3–2. In 1944, British Guiana participated in a triangular tournament in Trinidad and Tobago, facing its national team and Barbados. It won two matches against Barbados (1–0 and 3–0) before drawing 1–1 and losing 3–0 to Trinidad and Tobago. In the final of this triangular tournament, it again lost 3–0 to Trinidad and Tobago.

In November 1947 British Guiana played in a Standard Life tournament in Trinidad and Tobago. They beat the hosts 2–1 in their opening game on 5 November before beating Jamaica 2–0 the very next day. On 10 November they drew 0–0 with Jamaica before losing 2–0 to Trinidad and Tobago in the last game on 14 November.

British Guiana played its first home games in 1950 against Trinidad and Tobago: these were British Guiana's first matches since the Standard Life tournament. British Guiana lost 1–0 and 4–1 before winning 1–0. The last match played under the name British Guiana was the 1–1 draw against Barbados in January 1966.

=== 1966–2006 ===
After gaining independence in 1966, Guyana played its first official competitive matches during the qualifiers for the 1971 CONCACAF Championship against Suriname. The first match, away, was lost 4–1 and the home match on 21 September 1971 was lost 3–2 as Suriname advanced 7–3 on aggregate. In 1976 Guyana entered its first ever World Cup qualification campaign with the aim of reaching the 1978 FIFA World Cup in Argentina. Guyana and Suriname were drawn in a two-legged preliminary in the Caribbean section of CONCACAF qualification and Guyana won the first leg 2–0 at home on 4 July 1976. The second leg in Paramaribo was lost 3–0 which allowed Suriname to advance.

Guyana participated in its first Caribbean Cup finals in 1991, where it finished in 4th place. But the 2000s got off to a bad start with a FIFA suspension which prevented him from participating in the qualifiers for the 2002 World Cup.

Guyana had a remarkable calendar year in 2006, with eleven successive wins, including five CONCACAF Gold Cup qualifiers. These results boosted Guyana's spot in the FIFA World Rankings by 87 spots in little over a year. As a consequence, the team rose to the top 12 in CONCACAF and were in the third rank of seeds in the World Cup qualifying draw.

=== 2006–2019 ===
==== Caribbean Nations Cup 2007 and 2010 ====
At the 2006–07 Caribbean Nations Cup, Guyana finished top of Group A in Stage One, then top of Group H in Stage Two (which they hosted), and finished 3rd in the Bobby Sookram Group, missing out on a semi-final berth on goal difference alone. Had Guyana reached the semi-finals, they would have qualified for the 2007 CONCACAF Gold Cup.

Having qualified for the final phase of the 2010 Caribbean Cup, held in Martinique, Guyana finished last in Group I with one point from a 1–1 draw with Guadeloupe.

==== 2014 World Cup qualifying ====
With the return of international coach Jamaal Shabazz, Guyana finished top of a group containing Trinidad and Tobago, Barbados and Bermuda to reach the third round of qualifying for the 2014 World Cup in Brazil. They qualified with one game to go with a 2–1 home win against Trinidad and Tobago on 11 November 2011.

Guyana organised friendly matches in 2012 against Panama (20 May), Colombia (28 May) and Bolivia (15 August) for the first team. In the third round group, they finished last, behind Mexico, Costa Rica and El Salvador, with one point from their six matches.

==== Lack of football 2013/14 ====
From November 2012 to October 2014 Guyana did not play a single international fixture. This amongst other factors led to FIFA stepping in and removing the GFF executive at the end of 2014.

==== 2015 and 2016 return of the Golden Jaguars ====
With FIFA stepping into Guyana once again, a FIFA Normalisation Committee was installed to regularise football in Guyana. With this came the search for a National Team Head Coach with Jamaal Shabazz reinstalled initially for one game versus Barbados on February 2, 2015. As Guyana had lost many first team players to retirement since 2012, the squad was a new younger group with major gaps in the goalkeeper and defensive areas.

==== First CONCACAF Gold Cup in 2019 ====
Having finished 7th in the 2019–2020 CONCACAF Nations League qualifiers, the Guyanese team have earned the right to participate for the first time in the CONCACAF Gold Cup in the 2019 edition.

Placed in Group D of the tournament alongside the host country (the United States), Panama and Trinidad and Tobago, Guyana was eliminated in the first round with only one draw (1–1 against Trinidad and Tobago).

=== 2020−present ===
During the qualifying tournaments for the 2022 and 2026 World Cups, Guyana was quickly eliminated (1st round and 2nd round in 2022 and 2026 respectively).

Promoted to League A of the 2024–25 CONCACAF Nations League, the Golden Jaguars were immediately relegated. They missed the opportunity to compete in the 2025 CONCACAF Gold Cup, being eliminated in the prelims by Guatemala in two legs (3–2 and 0–2).

== Team image ==
=== Kit sponsorship ===
Kit supplier	Period
(Germany) Uhlsport	2002–2004
(Germany) Adidas	2005–2007
None (In House)	2008–2010
(Haiti) Plus One	2011
(Colombia) Saeta	2012–2015
(United Kingdom) Admiral	2016
(Japan) Squadra	2018
(United States) Capelli Sport	2019–2023
(United States) SQ Apparel	2024
(Spain) Meyba	2025–present

== Results and fixtures ==
The following is a list of match results in the last 12 months, as well as any future matches that have been scheduled.

Win Draw Loss Fixture

=== 2026 ===
27 March 2025–26 CONCACAF Series	Guyana	2–0	Dominica	Santiago de los Caballeros, Dominican Republic
16:30 UTC−4	De Rosario 28', 31'	Report		Stadium: Estadio Cibao FC; Referee: Patrick Senecharles (Haiti)

30 March 2025–26 CONCACAF Series	Guyana	3–1	Belize	Santiago de los Caballeros, Dominican Republic
16:30 UTC−4	De Rosario 2', 22', 90+1'	Report	Desmond Wade 8'	Stadium: Estadio Cibao FC; Referee: Eric de la Cruz (Cuba)

24 September 2026–27 CONCACAF Nations League	Puerto Rico	0–1	Guyana	Roseau, Dominica
		Report	De Rosario 78' (pen.)	Stadium: Windsor Park

27 September 2026–27 CONCACAF Nations League	Guyana	2–0	Cayman Islands	Roseau, Dominica
	Gordon 15'; De Rosario 36'	Report		Stadium: Windsor Park

1 October 2026–27 CONCACAF Nations League	Dominica	1–5	Guyana	Mayagüez, Puerto Rico
	Jules 75'	Report	De Rosario 27'; Glasgow 41'; Moore 50'; Benjamin 79'; George 90'	Stadium: Mayagüez Athletics Stadium

4 October 2026–27 CONCACAF Nations League	Guyana	8–1	Dominica	Mayagüez, Puerto Rico
	Glasgow 5', 33'; Moore 8', 57'; Bonds 24', 75'; Kellman 53'; E.George 69'	Report	Cuffy 67'	Stadium: Mayagüez Athletics Stadium

12 November 2026–27 CONCACAF Nations League	Cayman Islands	0–6	Guyana	Georgetown, Guyana
		Report	Glasgow 5'; Morgan Ferrier 12'; De Rosario 39'; Duke-McKenna 42', 48'; N.Ferguson 50'	Stadium: Synthetic Track and Field Facility

16 November 2026–27 CONCACAF Nations League	Guyana	4–2	Puerto Rico	Georgetown, Guyana
	I.Jones 51'; De Rosario 59' (pen.); Duke-McKenna 73'; D.Moore 76'	Report	W.Rivera 14'; R.Rivera 75'	Stadium: Synthetic Track and Field Facility

== Coaching staff ==
As of 11 July 2026

Head coach	(Canada) Marco Bonofiglio
Assistant coach	John Borsellino
Strength & Conditioning Coach	(Guyana) Renzo Patel
Team Manager	(Guyana) Tyrese Stanley
Goalkeeping coach	(Guyana) Evon Cobaine
Kitman	(Guyana) Hal Portius
Head scout	(Guyana) Romild Christie
GFF President	(Guyana) Wayne Forde
Technical director	(Guyana) Gennarius Huxley

=== Coaching history ===
- (Guyana) Feroze Usman (1975–82)
- (Guyana) Mervyn Wilson (1983)
- (Guyana) Lennox Arthur (1984–1987)
- (Guyana) Mervyn Wilson (1988)
- (Guyana) Gordon Braithwaite (1991–1992)
- (Guyana) Mervyn Wilson (1993–1994)
- (Guyana) Earl O'Neal (1996)
- (Guyana) Deryck White (1998)
- (Guyana) Joseph Wilson (2000–2002)
- (Brazil) Neider dos Santos (2002–2004)
- (Trinidad and Tobago) Jamaal Shabazz (2005–2009)
- (Guyana) Wayne Dover (2009–2010)
- (Trinidad and Tobago) Jamaal Shabazz (2011–2012)
- (Guyana) Denzil Thompson (2014)
- (Trinidad and Tobago) Jamaal Shabazz (2015–2016)
- (Guyana) Wayne Dover (2017)
- (Jamaica) Michael Johnson (2018–2019)
- (Brazil) Márcio Máximo (2019–2021)
- (Trinidad and Tobago) Jamaal Shabazz (2021–2024)
- (Guyana) Wayne Dover (2024–2025)
- (United States) Thomas Dooley (2025–2026)
- (Canada) Marco Bonofiglio (2026-)

== Players ==
=== Current squad ===
The following players were called up for the 2026–27 CONCACAF Nations League matches against Cayman Islands on 12 November, and against Puerto Rico on 16 November 2026.

Caps and goals updated as of 16 November 2026, after the match against Puerto Rico.

No.	Pos.	Player	Date of birth (age)	Caps	Goals	Club
	GK	Quillan Roberts	13 September 1994 (age 32)	30	0	(New Zealand Football) Western Suburbs
	GK	Akel Clarke	25 October 1988 (age 38)	21	0	(Guyana Football Federation) Slingerz
	GK	Grant Wyles	3 January 2005 (age 21)	0	0	(United States Soccer Federation) Niagara Purple Eagles
	DF	Liam Gordon	15 May 1999 (age 27)	34	3	(The Football Association) Port Vale
	DF	Leo Lovell	6 December 1996 (age 29)	32	2	(Guyana Football Federation) Slingerz
	DF	Jalen Jones	13 November 1998 (age 28)	32	2	(The Football Association) Dover Athletic
	DF	Terence Vancooten	29 December 1997 (age 28)	24	1	(The Football Association) Stevenage
	DF	Raushan Ritch	5 April 2000 (age 26)	11	0	(Guyana Football Federation) Slingerz
	DF	Imani Barker	13 August 2002 (age 24)	3	0	(Association of Football Federations of Azerbaijan) Sumgayit
	MF	Nathan Moriah-Welsh	18 March 2002 (age 24)	36	3	(The Football Association) Mansfield Town
	MF	Elliot Bonds	23 March 2000 (age 26)	33	2	(The Football Association) Fleetwood Town
	MF	Curtez Kellman	6 March 1998 (age 28)	27	1	(Guyana Football Federation) Slingerz
	MF	Stephen Duke-McKenna	17 August 2000 (age 26)	30	5	(The Football Association) Crawley Town
	MF	Nathan Ferguson	12 October 1995 (age 31)	21	2	(The Football Association) Hartlepool United
	MF	Darron Niles	3 May 2003 (age 23)	9	0	(Guyana Football Federation) Slingerz
	FW	Kelsey Benjamin	8 May 1999 (age 27)	43	8	(Guyana Football Federation) Slingerz
	FW	Omari Glasgow	22 November 2003 (age 23)	42	27	(United States Soccer Federation) Monterey Bay
	FW	Deon Moore	14 May 1999 (age 27)	21	9	(The Football Association) Torquay United
	FW	Osaze De Rosario	19 July 2001 (age 25)	18	18	(Danish Football Association) Sønderjyske
	FW	Isaiah Jones	26 June 1999 (age 27)	12	7	(The Football Association) Luton Town
	FW	Enoch George	23 May 2003 (age 23)	10	3	(Royal Dutch Football Association) Scheveningen
	FW	Morgan Ferrier	15 November 1994 (age 32)	4	1	(Korea Football Association) Incheon United

=== Recent call-ups ===
The following players have been called up within the past year.

Pos.	Player	Date of birth (age)	Caps	Goals	Club	Latest call-up
GK	Emmanuel Lewis	12 April 2007 (age 19)	0	0	(Guyana) Slingerz	v.Dominica, 4 October 2026
GK	Joshua Naraine	22 January 2003 (age 23)	0	0	(Canada) Pickering FC	v.Belize, 30 March 2026
DF	Kvist Paul	1 April 2006 (age 20)	3	0	(Jamaica) Waterhouse	v.Dominica, 4 October 2026
DF	Walker Shabazz-Edwards	4 May 2007 (age 19)	1	0	(England) Ipswich Town	v.Belize, 30 March 2026
MF	Solomon Austin	10 August 2005 (age 21)	1	0	(Guyana) Slingerz	v.Dominica, 4 October 2026
MF	Kyle Reid	3 January 2005 (age 21)	2	0	Unknown	v.Belize, 30 March 2026
MF	Shemar Scott	27 September 2000 (age 26)	0	0	Guyana Defence Force	v.Belize, 30 March 2026
MF	Brandon Solomon	4 April 2004 (age 22)	0	0	(Guyana) Police	v.Belize, 30 March 2026
FW	Bryan Wharton	28 August 2007 (age 19)	3	0	(Guyana) Slingerz	v.Dominica, 4 October 2026
FW	Neron Barrow	14 April 2004 (age 22)	1	0	(Guyana) Slingerz	v.Dominica, 4 October 2026
FW	Maliq Cadogan	25 February 2004 (age 22)	5	0	(England) Peterborough Sports	v.Belize, 30 March 2026
FW	Reiss Elliott-Parris	4 November 2007 (age 19)	0	0	(England) Tottenham Hotspur	v.Belize, 30 March 2026
^{INJ} Withdrew due to injury.^{PRE} Preliminary squad.^{RET} Retired from the national team.^{WD} Withdrew for personal reasons.

== Player records ==
Players in bold are still active with Guyana.
As of 16 November 2026

=== Most appearances ===
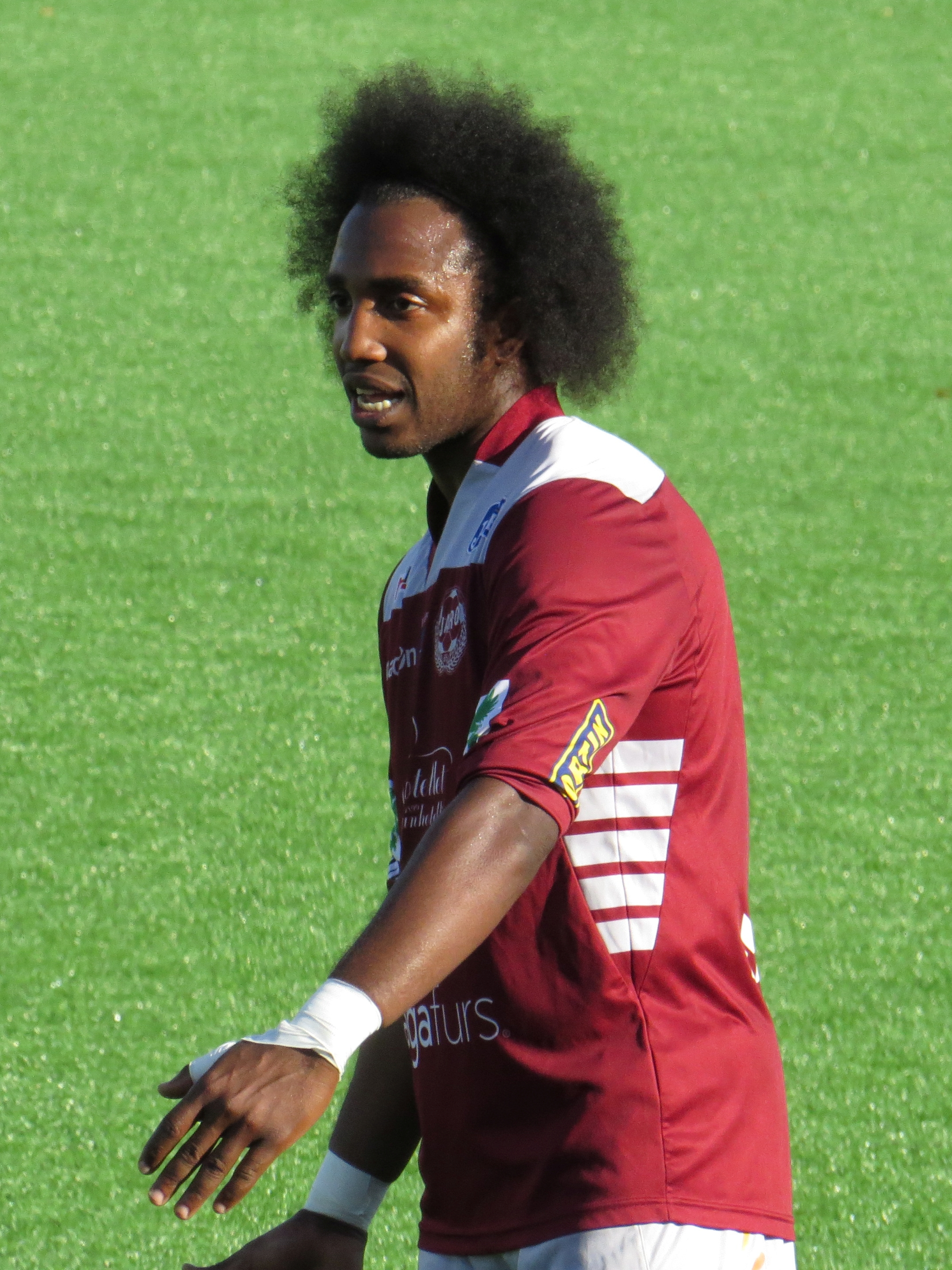
Walter Moore is Guyana's most capped player with 77 appearances.

Rank	Player	Caps	Goals	Career
1	Walter Moore	77	5	2004–2019
2	Daniel Wilson	70	1	2011–2025
3	Earl O'Neal	69	1	1971–1980
4	Charles Pollard	60	3	1996–2012
5	Anthony Abrams	58	15	2004–2017
6	Trayon Bobb	51	12	2011–2023
7	Howard Lowe	46	1	2002–2010
7	Gregory Richardson	46	17	2002–2019
9	**Kelsey Benjamin**	43	7	2017–present
10	**Omari Glasgow**	42	27	2021–
10	Dwain Jacobs	42	1	2008–2017

=== Top goalscorers ===
Rank	Player	Goals	Caps	Ratio	Career
1	**Omari Glasgow**	27	42	0.64	2021–present
2	**Osaze De Rosario**	18	18	1	2023–present
2	Nigel Codrington	18	26	0.69	2001–2010
4	Gregory Richardson	17	46	0.37	2002–2019
5	Anthony Abrams	15	58	0.26	2004–2017
6	Trayon Bobb	12	51	0.24	2011–2023
7	Neil Danns	11	23	0.48	2015–2023
7	Emery Welshman	11	28	0.39	2015–2023
9	**Deon Moore**	9	21	0.43	2023–present
9	Randolph Jerome	9	21	0.43	1998–2008
9	Sheldon Holder	9	34	0.26	2011–2021

== Competitive record ==
=== FIFA World Cup ===
FIFA World Cup									FIFA World Cup qualification					
Year	Round	Position	Pld	W	D*	L	GF	GA	Pld	W	D*	L	GF	GA
1930 to 1970	Not a FIFA member								Not a FIFA member					
(West Germany) 1974	Did not enter								Declined participation					
(Argentina) 1978	Did not qualify								2	1	0	1	2	3
(Spain) 1982	Did not qualify								6	2	0	4	8	13
(Mexico) 1986	Did not qualify								2	0	1	1	1	2
(Italy) 1990	Did not qualify								2	0	0	2	0	5
(United States) 1994	Did not qualify								2	0	1	1	2	3
(France) 1998	Did not qualify								2	0	0	2	1	8
(South Korea) (Japan) 2002	Suspended by FIFA								Suspended by FIFA					
(Germany) 2006	Did not qualify								2	0	0	2	1	8
(South Africa) 2010	Did not qualify								2	0	0	2	1	3
(Brazil) 2014	Did not qualify								12	4	2	6	14	30
(Russia) 2018	Did not qualify								2	0	2	0	6	6
(Qatar) 2022	Did not qualify								4	1	0	3	4	8
(Canada) (Mexico) (United States) 2026	Did not qualify								4	2	0	2	6	4
(Morocco) (Portugal) (Spain) 2030	To be determined								To be determined					
(Saudi Arabia) 2034	To be determined								To be determined					
Total		0/13							42	10	6	26	46	93

=== CONCACAF Gold Cup ===
CONCACAF Championship & Gold Cup record										Qualification record					
Year	Round	Position	Pld	W	D*	L	GF	GA	Squad	Pld	W	D*	L	GF	GA
(El Salvador) 1963	Did not enter									Did not enter					
(Guatemala) 1965	Did not enter									Did not enter					
(Honduras) 1967	Did not enter									Did not enter					
(Costa Rica) 1969	Did not enter									Did not enter					
(Trinidad and Tobago) 1971	Did not enter									Did not enter					
(Haiti) 1973	Did not enter									Did not enter					
(Mexico) 1977	Did not qualify									2	1	0	1	2	3
(Honduras) 1981	Did not qualify									6	2	0	4	8	13
1985	Did not qualify									2	0	1	1	1	2
1989	Did not qualify									2	0	0	2	0	5
(United States) 1991	Did not qualify									6	2	1	3	9	15
(Mexico) (United States) 1993	Did not qualify									3	1	0	2	3	7
(United States) 1996	Did not qualify									2	0	0	2	0	7
(United States) 1998	Did not enter									Did not enter					
(United States) 2000	Did not qualify									5	1	2	2	19	12
(United States) 2002	Did not qualify									3	2	0	1	4	3
(Mexico) (United States) 2003	Did not qualify									2	1	0	1	2	2
(United States) 2005	Withdrew									Withdrew					
(United States) 2007	Did not qualify									9	7	1	1	28	7
(United States) 2009	Did not qualify									5	1	3	1	7	5
(United States) 2011	Did not qualify									3	0	1	2	1	6
(United States) 2013	Did not qualify									8	4	0	4	15	11
(Canada) (United States) 2015	Did not qualify									3	0	1	2	0	4
(United States) 2017	Did not qualify									6	3	0	3	21	12
(Costa Rica) (Jamaica) (United States) 2019	Group stage	13th	3	0	1	2	3	9	Squad	4	3	0	1	14	3
(United States) 2021	Did not qualify									7	3	1	3	12	14
(Canada) (United States) 2023	Did not qualify									8	3	2	3	9	17
(Canada) (United States) 2025	Did not qualify									8	3	1	4	17	21
2027	Qualified									6	6	0	0	26	4
Total	Group stage	2/29	3	0	1	2	3	9	—	99	43	14	43	198	173

=== CONCACAF Nations League ===
CONCACAF Nations League record
League											Finals								
Season	Division	Group	Pld	W	D	L	GF	GA	P/R		Finals	Result	Pld	W	D	L	GF	GA	Squad
2019–20	B	C	6	3	1	2	12	10	Same position		(United States) 2021	Ineligible							
2022–23	B	B	6	3	1	2	8	14	Same position		(United States) 2023	Ineligible							
2023–24	B	D	5	5	0	0	20	5	▲		(United States) 2024	Ineligible							
2024–25	A	A	4	0	1	3	5	13	▼		(United States) 2025	Did not qualify							
2026–27	B	A	6	6	0	0	26	4	▲		(United States) 2027	Ineligible							
Total	—	—	27	17	3	7	71	46	—	Total	0 Titles	—	—	—	—	—	—	—	

=== Caribbean Cup ===
CFU Championship & Caribbean Cup record									Qualification record					
Year	Round	Position	Pld	W	D	L	GF	GA	Pld	W	D	L	GF	GA
(Trinidad and Tobago) 1978	Did not qualify								2	0	0	2	1	4
(Suriname) 1979	Did not enter								Did not enter					
(Puerto Rico) 1981	Did not enter								Did not enter					
(French Guiana) 1983	Did not qualify								4	1	2	1	3	5
(Barbados) 1985	Did not qualify								2	1	1	0	1	1
(Martinique) 1988	Did not qualify								2	0	0	2	0	5
(Barbados) 1989	Did not enter								Did not enter					
(Trinidad and Tobago) 1990	Did not qualify								3	0	2	1	1	6
(Jamaica) 1991	Fourth place	4th	4	1	0	3	4	14	2	1	1	0	5	1
(Trinidad and Tobago) 1992	Did not qualify								3	1	1	1	4	5
(Jamaica) 1993	Did not qualify								3	1	0	2	3	7
(Trinidad and Tobago) 1994	Did not qualify								2	0	0	2	1	4
(Cayman Islands) (Jamaica) 1995	Did not qualify								2	0	0	2	0	7
(Trinidad and Tobago) 1996	Did not qualify								2	1	0	1	3	3
(Antigua and Barbuda) (Saint Kitts and Nevis) 1997	Did not qualify								4	1	1	2	5	9
(Jamaica) (Trinidad and Tobago) 1998	Did not qualify								3	1	1	1	17	4
(Trinidad and Tobago) 1999	Did not qualify								2	0	1	1	2	4
(Trinidad and Tobago) 2001	Did not qualify								3	2	0	1	4	3
(Barbados) 2005	Withdrew								Withdrew					
(Trinidad and Tobago) 2007	Group stage	5th	3	1	1	1	4	5	6	6	0	0	24	2
(Jamaica) 2008	Did not qualify								5	1	3	1	7	5
(Martinique) 2010	Group stage	8th	3	0	1	2	1	6	6	4	1	1	9	4
(Antigua and Barbuda) 2012	Did not qualify								6	3	0	3	11	9
(Jamaica) 2014	Did not qualify								3	0	1	2	0	4
(Martinique) 2017	Did not qualify								6	3	0	3	21	12
Total	Fourth place	3/25	10	2	2	6	9	25	71	27	15	29	122	104

== Honours ==
=== Friendly ===
- Martinez Shield (3): 1929, 1931, 1932

== See also ==
- Guyana national under-20 football team
- Guyana national under-17 football team
- Football in Guyana
