= Earl O'Neal =

Guyanaese footballer and manager

Personal information
- Date of birth: November 24, 1950 (age 75)
- Place of birth: British Guiana
- Position: Defender

Senior career*
Years	Team	Apps	(Gls)
1966–1990	Thomas United		

International career
1971–1980	Guyana	69	(1)

Managerial career
- 1996–1997: Guyana
- * Club domestic league appearances and goals

Earl O'Neal (born November 24, 1950) is a Guyanese football manager and former player who played as a defender. He was nicknamed 'The Pig', due to his ability to easily run through mud during rainy matches.

On October 31, 2021, he was included in the IFFHS's men's all-time Guyana dream team.

== Early life ==
O'Neal was born on November 24, 1950, and was the youngest of six children. Growing up, he primarily played cricket, and also did track and field, representing the city of Georgetown in both the 100 metres and 200 metres events. At the age of 16, he was denied the chance to participate in a cricket competition in Guyana, leading to him quitting the sport.

== Career ==
In 1966, a friend of O'Neal's took him to join Guyanese club Thomas United. Initially, he started as a striker, but after being convinvced by club captain Ken Gibbs, he switched to playing as a defender. In 1974, he was one of three Guyanese players selected to represent a Caribbean team against English club Hull City at the Georgetown Cricket Club Ground. The match ended in a 1–1 draw, but O'Neal needed stitches after being elbowed in the head by Hull City captain Terry Neill. In November 1978, he again represented a Caribbean team, this time against a team from the Chinese province of Kwang Tung, which they lost 1–0.

O'Neal retired from football in 1990.

=== International career ===
Shortly after a match in the 1971 CONCACAF Champions' Cup against Surinamese side Transvaal, he was called up to the Guyana national team, making his debut that year. He later became the national team's captain in 1976, succeeding Maurice Enmore. Overall, he made 69 appearances for Guyana, scoring once from a free kick against Barbados in 1977.

== Managerial career ==
Following his retirement, O'Neal switch to coaching. Between 1996 and 1997, he coached six matches, including losing 8–1 on aggregate to Grenada in the preliminary round of 1998 FIFA World Cup qualification, and beating French Guiana in 1997 Caribbean Cup qualifying.

== Personal life ==
O'Neal has three daughters.
