= Wayne Dover =

Guyanese footballer and manager

Personal information
- Date of birth: 30 October 1973 (age 52)
- Place of birth: Guyana

International career
Years	Team	Apps	(Gls)
- Guyana

Managerial career
- 2009–2010: Guyana
- 2010–2015: Alpha United FC
- 2015–2017: Guyana (assistant manager)
- 2017–2018: Guyana (caretaker manager)
- 2018–2021: Guyana U20
- 2024–2025: Guyana

Wayne "Wiggy" Dover (born 30 October 1973) is a Guyanese professional football player and manager.

== Career ==
Dover played for Guyana national team.

Between 2009 and 2025, he coached the Guyana national team on three separate occasions. He was also assistant manager to Jamaal Shabazz, as well as coach of Guyana's under-20 side. In club football, he was head coach of Alpha United FC from 2010 until 2015.
