= Rolston James =

Trinidadian footballer (1975–2002)

Personal information
- Date of birth: 21 December 1975
- Place of birth: Plymouth, Tobago
- Date of death: 16 December 2002 (aged 26)
- Place of death: Port of Spain
- Position: Forward

Senior career*
Years	Team	Apps	(Gls)
1998–2001	San Juan Jabloteh		
2001–2002	Happy Valley		
2002	W Connection		

International career
2000–2001	Trinidad and Tobago	2	(0)
- * Club domestic league appearances and goals

Rolston James (21 December 1975 - 16 December 2002) was a Trinidadian professional footballer who played as a forward. He made two appearances for the Trinidad and Tobago national team.

== Career ==
James played club football for W Connection and was involved in the club's 2002 CFU Club Championship campaign.

Prior to signing for W Connection, he had a five-month spell with Happy Valley in between December 2001 and April 2002 in Hong Kong, scoring five goals during his time there.

He played twice for the Trinidad and Tobago national team. His début came against Cuba on 4 July 2000. His second and final game would come against Grenada on 27 January 2001.

In December 2002 he was shot dead in his apartment at the age of 26.
