= Joseph Wilson (Australian cricketer) =

Australian cricketer

Personal information
- Born: 11 February 1869; Braidwood, New South Wales, Australia
- Died: 26 August 1938 (aged 69); Wollongong, New South Wales, Australia
- Source: ESPNcricinfo, 8 February 2017

Joseph Wilson (11 February 1869 – 26 August 1938) was an Australian cricketer. He played one first-class match for New South Wales in 1891/92 and one first-class match for Transvaal in 1905/06.

== See also ==
- List of New South Wales representative cricketers
