= Mervyn Wilson =

Northern Irish Anglican priest (1922–2022)

Mervyn Robert Wilson (21 June 1922 – 18 November 2022) was an Anglican priest in Ireland in the 20th century who was Dean of Dromore from 1990 to 1992.

== Biography ==
Wilson was born in East Belfast on 21 June 1922. He was educated at Everton Elementary School and Sullivan Upper School, followed by the University of Bristol and ordination training at Tyndale Hall, Bristol. He was ordained deacon in 1952 and priest in 1953. He was successively curate of Ballymacarrett (1952–56), Donaghcloney (1956–59); and Newtownards (1959–61). He was then Rector of Ballyphilip with Ardquin (1961–70); St Patrick's, Newry (1970–92); Rural Dean of Kilbroney and Newry and Mourne (1977–90); Prebendary of Dromore Cathedral (1983–85); Canon of Belfast Cathedral (1985–89); and finally Dean of Dromore (1990–92).

Wilson died on 18 November 2022, at the age of 100.
