= Joseph Wilson (football manager) =

Guyanese professional football manager

Personal information
- Place of birth: Guyana

Managerial career
- Years: Team
- Guyana U-17
- Guyana U-20
- Guyana U-23
- 2000–2002: Guyana

Joseph "Bill" Wilson is a Guyanese professional football manager.

== Career ==
Since 2000 until 2002 he coached the Guyana national football team.
