= Ronald La Forest =

Trinidadian footballer (born 1954)

Personal information
- Full name: Ronald Michael La Forest
- Date of birth: 28 November 1954 (age 71)
- Place of birth: Belmont, Port of Spain, Trinidad and Tobago
- Position: Forward

Youth career
- Belmont Secondary

Senior career*
Years	Team	Apps	(Gls)
1972–1981	Defence Force		
c. 1988	Aviation Services		

International career
1971–1973	Trinidad and Tobago U19		
1974–1988	Trinidad and Tobago	2	(0)

Managerial career
- 1984–1986: Frontline
- 1987: ECM Motown
- 1999–2000: San Juan Jabloteh
- 2001–2004: Joe Public
- 2008–2009: Ma Pau Stars
- 2013–2014: Guaya United
- 2020–: Real West Fort United
- * Club domestic league appearances and goals

Ronald Michael La Forest (born 28 November 1954) is a Trinidadian retired football player and manager. Nicknamed "The Professor", as a player, he played for Defence Force and Aviation Services Limited throughout the 1970s and 1980s. As a manager, he managed San Juan Jabloteh, Joe Public and Ma Pau throughout the 2000s.

== Club career ==
La Forest began his career within Belmont Secondary in the early 1970s before spending his senior career with Defence Force from 1972 to 1981. He then played for Aviation Services throughout the remainder of the decade and the following 1980s. Notably, he was also the first Caribbean footballer to play abroad in Hong Kong, arriving there in 1984.

== International career ==
La Forest initially played within the Trinidad and Tobago U19 throughout 1971 and 1973. He was later called up for the senior team for the 1977 CONCACAF Championship qualifiers in the decisive playoff match against Suriname in French Guiana with the Soca Warriors narrowly missing qualification for the tournament. He was later called up for the 1989 CONCACAF Championship qualifiers where he was part of the 1–0 victory over Guyana on 8 May 1988.

== Managerial career ==
La Forest first began his managerial career within Frontline after his retirement in 1984 within the Northern Football Association, winning the 1985 season and cup before moving to ECM Motown two years later. During the inaugural season of the TT Premier Football League, San Juan Jabloteh on 31 March 1999, managing the club's operations until 31 December 2000. He then served as manager for Joe Public beginning in the 2001 TT Pro League and served for the following three seasons. Following that, he served as manager for Ma Pau Stars in 2008 and 2009 until being replaced with Brazilian manager Ubirajara Veiga da Silva. He then served within the lower leagues, serving as manager for Guaya United for the 2013–14 Super League.

He also had brief international stints, managing Trinidad and Tobago U17 team in 2001, the Trinidad and Tobago U21 team in 2004 and as an assistant manager for Bertille St Clair in 2005 for the senior team.

He had also been active in youth football, operating the Ron La Forest Academy. He also established Real West Fort United that plays at the Diego Martin Sporting Complex that has been continuing operations since the 2020–21 Ascension League.

== Personal life ==
La forest has three children with one child being from his current wife Elizabeth.
