= Dale Saunders (football) =

Trinidad and Tobago footballer and coach

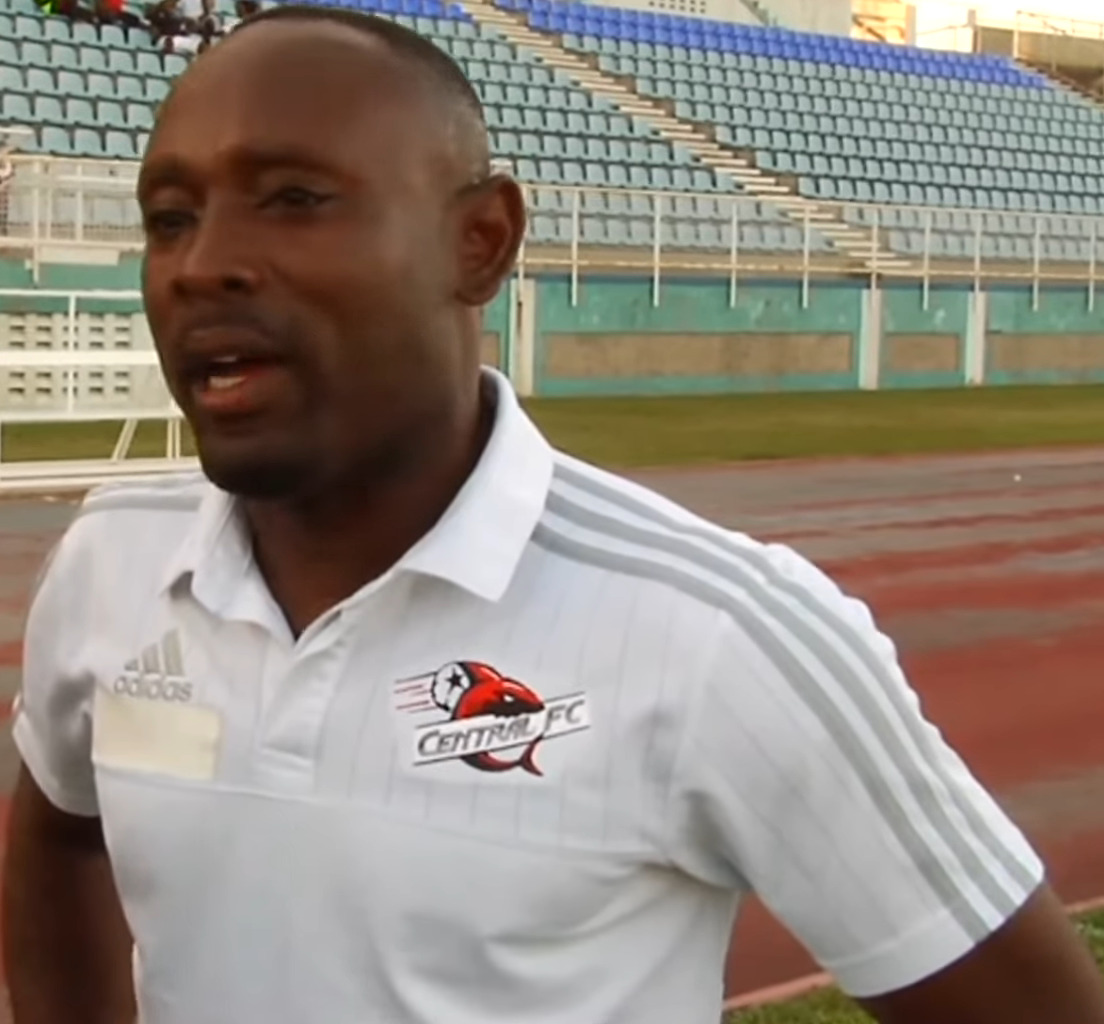
Saunders at an interview as Central FC Coach in 2017

Dale Saunders (born 9 November 1973 on Trinidad) is a former football player and now football coach from Trinidad and Tobago. He earned 48 caps and scored 4 goals for the national team between 1997 and 2003. He played as a midfielder. Since 2016 he's the coach of Central F.C. until he left in September 2017.

== Clubs ==
- Mucurapo Senior Comprehensive
- Starworld Strikers
- San Juan Jabloteh
- Joe Public F.C.
