= Anton Pierre =

Trinidad and Tobago footballer

Anton Pierre (born 23 September 1977 in Port of Spain) is a football defender from Trinidad and Tobago. He began playing club football with St. Ann's Rangers before spending most of his career with Defence Force. He obtained 52 caps and scored 1 goal for the national team between 1996 and 2005. In May 2005 he was left out of the national team by new coach Leo Beenhakker, but he was called up as a standby player to the 2006 World Cup.

== Clubs ==
- (Trinidad and Tobago) Defence Force
