= Errol McFarlane =

Trinidadian footballer (born 1977)

Personal information
- Full name: Errol McFarlane Jr.
- Date of birth: October 12, 1977 (age 49)
- Place of birth: Port of Spain, Trinidad and Tobago
- Height: 6 ft 1 in (1.85 m)
- Position: Forward

Youth career
- 1995: Nassau Lions
- 1996–1998: Hofstra Pride

Senior career*
Years	Team	Apps	(Gls)
1999	Defence Force		
1999–2001	Al-Nejmeh		
2001	Fylkir	9	(0)
2001–2002	Al-Nejmeh		
2002	San Juan Jabloteh	?	(3)
2002–2005	Al-Nejmeh		
2005	Breiðablik		
2006–2007	Superstar Rangers	?	(23)
2007–2008	Al-Mabarrah		
2009	St. Ann's Rangers	11	(5)
2009	Rochester Rhinos	12	(2)
2010–2011	North East Stars		

International career
2001–2009	Trinidad and Tobago	38	(7)
- * Club domestic league appearances and goals as of 21 October 2009

Errol McFarlane Jr. (born October 12, 1977) is a Trinidadian former footballer who played as a forward.

== Club career ==
=== Youth and college ===
Born in Port of Spain, McFarlane attended Trinity College in his native Trinidad, and briefly attended Malick Secondary Comprehensive, before moving to the United States in 1995 to attend Nassau Community College. He transferred to Hofstra University in his sophomore year, and subsequently spent the next three years playing college soccer for the Pride.

=== Professional ===
McFarlane turned professional in 1999 with Defence Force in the TT Pro League, winning the inaugural league title in his first season. He won a second T&T PFL Championship winner's medal with San Juan Jabloteh in 2002 before signing with Al-Nejmeh in the Lebanese Professional League, where he quickly became one of the leading marksmen in that country. He finished the 2003/2004 season with 15 goals, helping the club to the league title and a place in the 2004 AFC Cup.

McFarlane has also played professionally in Iceland, for Fylkir and Breiðablik. After another brief stint in Lebanon with Al-Mabarrah and back home in Trinidad with St. Ann's Rangers, McFarlane signed a two-year deal with the Rochester Rhinos of the USL First Division on July 23, 2009, but was let go after scoring only 2 goals in 12 appearances.

== International career ==
McFarlane has made 38 appearances for the senior Trinidad and Tobago national football team. He was part of the qualifying team in the 2006 FIFA World Cup, but was not selected in the final squad due to a late hamstring injury.

== Personal life ==
Errol is the brother of fellow professional Shem McFarlane, who plays for his former club St. Ann's Rangers.

== Honours ==
Individual

- Lebanese Premier League Team of the Season: 2000–01
