= Jamaal Shabazz =

Trinidadian footballer and football manager

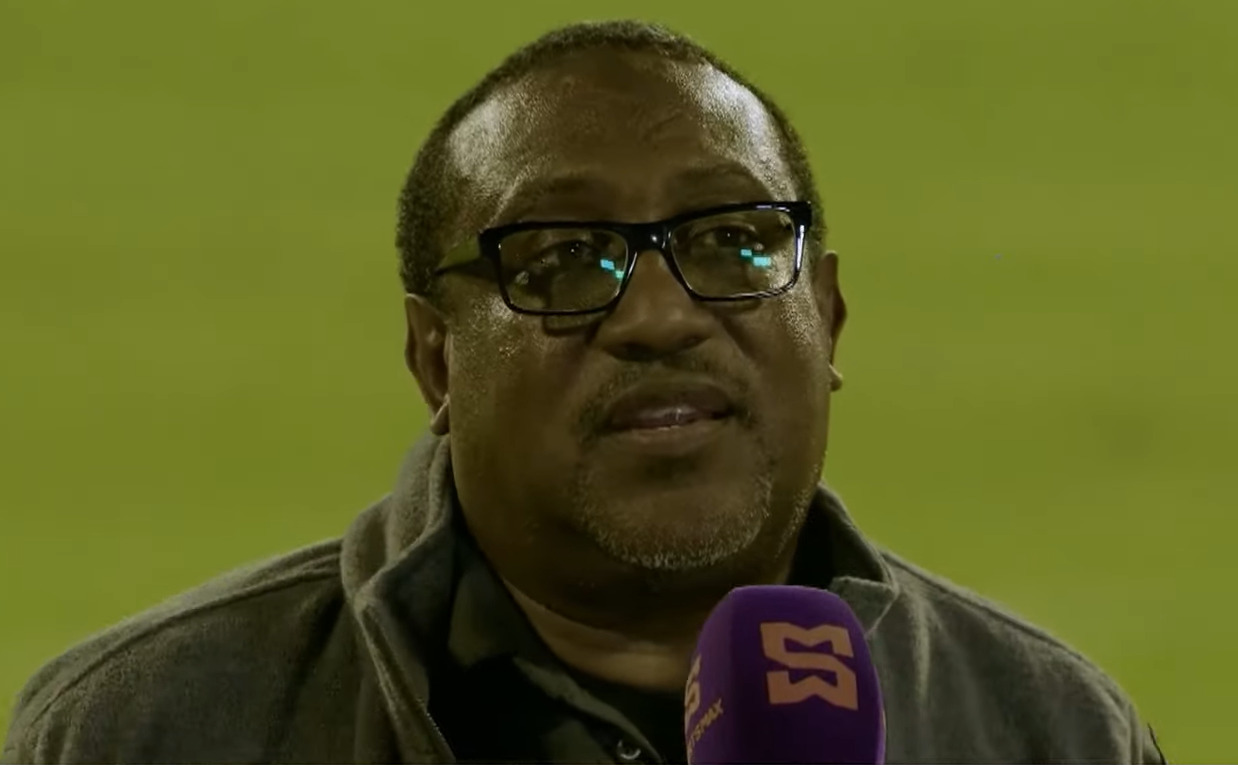
- Jamaal Shabazz at an interview as Guyana head coach after a loss to Trinidad and Tobago in a friendly in May 2024

Personal information
- Date of birth: 22 November 1963 (age 62)
- Place of birth: Port of Spain, Trinidad and Tobago
- Height: 1.70 m (5 ft 7 in)

Managerial career
- Years: Team
- 1999–2000: Joe Public
- 2000–2005: Morvant Caledonia United
- 2005–2008: Guyana
- 2011–2012: Guyana
- 2012–2013: Trinidad and Tobago (co-coach)
- 2015–2016: Guyana
- 2017–2018: Trinidad and Tobago (women)
- 2019–2021: St. Lucia
- 2021–2024: Guyana

Jamaal Shabazz (born 22 November 1963) is a Trinidadian football manager, who has recently vacated the position of head coach of the Guyana national football team. He is known for four different stints in charge of Guyana.

== Coup attempt ==
Shabazz was involved in the 1990 Jamaat al Muslimeen coup attempt under the group's leader Yasin Abu Bakr in his home country, with the belief that the army would support the uprising. The group was imprisoned for two years before the courts accepted the claim that their surrender had been based on a promise of amnesty; this was subsequently overturned by the Privy Council in London but the group were not re-arrested.

As a result of his involvement in the coup attempt, Shabazz has had conditions placed on his ability to travel to the United States as required for his duties as an international football manager. In 2012, he was unable to attend Guyana's World Cup qualifier against Mexico at BBVA Compass Stadium in Houston, Texas for "personal reasons" and planned to relay instructions to his assistant Wayne Dover via Skype. On 2 August 2012 he did not travel to Seattle, Washington for club side Caledonia AIA's 3–1 loss to Seattle Sounders.

== Football career ==
Shabazz was a press officer for CONCACAF from 1997 to 1998. After time coaching in his native country, he served as the manager and technical director of Guyana from 2005 to 2008. He established the side as a regional power with a series of results including 11 consecutive wins in 2006 and they reached their highest FIFA World Ranking of 86 in 2010.

Shabazz led the Trinidad and Tobago women's football programme in 2010 before returning to take charge of Guyana in August 2011. He led the Golden Jaguars to the third round of qualification for the 2014 FIFA World Cup, marking the furthest the national team had advanced in its history. This run included eliminating Shabazz's home country with a 2–1 win on 11 November 2011, ironically while Shabazz remained employed by the TTFA's coach education development programme. He left Guyana for the second time in November 2012.

The Morvant native is also technical director for club side Morvant Caledonia United in his home community, and has acted as head coach in between his international commitments. He was in charge during the 2012 CFU Club Championship victory and 2015 name change from Caledonia AIA.

In 2012 Shabazz had a spell as co-coach of his country's men's team with Hudson Charles, who had previously been on the opposing side as part of the military force responding to the 1990 coup attempt. At the time of their joint appointment, Shabazz remained a member of the religious organization Jamaat while Charles continued in his career as a warrant officer with the country's Defence Force. The duo lasted just four months at the helm before Leo Beenhakker and former Stephen Hart were brought in as technical director and head coach, respectively.

Shabazz's third spell with the Guyanese national team was announced at a press conference on 12 January 2015 ahead of a friendly against Barbados, and he signed a two-year deal with the Guyanese football association in March. He left the team on the expiry of his contract at the end of 2016 and took up duties as head coordinator of the TTFA's technical programmes. In December 2016 he was appointed alongside Russell Latapy as an assistant to Tom Saintfiet with the men's national team. He took over the women's national team after Carolina Morace left in 2017 and resigned from the role on 8 August 2018.

In 2019, Shabazz received a two-year appointment to the IFAB Football Advisory Panel. In May it was reported that he had signed a two-year deal to become head coach of St. Lucia ahead of the 2019-20 CONCACAF Nations League. With no immediate action scheduled for the team, who failed to qualify for the 2019 Gold Cup, Shabazz had been warming up with the country's elite women's programme. On 19 November 2019 St. Lucia lost 1–0 at home to Montserrat and were relegated to League C.

== Honours ==
Morvant Caledonia United

- Trinidad and Tobago FA Trophy: 2008, 2011-12, 2012-13
- TT Pro League Most Disciplined Team: 2011-12
- CFU Club Championship: 2012

Guyana

- FIFA World Rankings Biggest Mover: 2006

Individual

- GFF Presidential Award for Guyana's most successful head coach
