= 2015–16 GFF Elite League =

GFF Elite League
- Season: 2015–16
- Champions: Genesis: Slingerz (1st title); Finale: Alpha United (6th title); Overall: Slingerz
- CFU Club Championship: Slingerz; Alpha United
- Matches: 121
- Goals: 363 (3 per match)

The 2015–16 GFF Elite League (known as the 2015–16 Stag Elite League for sponsorship reasons) was the 15th season of the highest competitive football league in Guyana, and the 1st season of the Elite League. Eight FIFA licensed clubs participated in the inaugural Elite League season. The season was split into two parts (known as the Genesis and Finale rounds). Each half consisted of 14 rounds, with each team playing the other 7 teams twice each. In each round, the top 4 teams advanced to the playoffs. The winners of each half then faced off to determine the overall champion. The two half-season champions also advanced to the 2017 CFU Club Championship.

Slingerz (the Genesis round champions) defeated Alpha United (the Finale round champions) to win the overall championship.

== Team information ==
Cities of teams playing in the 2015–16 GFF Elite League

Team	City
Alpha United	Georgetown
Buxton United	Buxton
Fruta Conquerors	Georgetown
Georgetown	Georgetown
Guyana Defence Force	Georgetown
Monedderlust	Zee Lust
Pele	Georgetown
Slingerz	Vergenoegen

== Genesis round ==
The Genesis round consisted of 14 rounds from 18 September to 22 November 2015. Each team played the other 7 teams twice each. The top 4 teams advanced to the playoffs.

=== Genesis table ===
Pos	Team	Pld	W	D	L	GF	GA	GD	Pts	Qualification or relegation	SLI	PEL	ALP	FRU	GDF	BUX	GEO	MON
1	Slingerz	14	9	4	1	29	9	+20	28 (Note: Slingerz were deducted three points for not fielding a team in protest against Guyana Defence Force on 14 October after one of Slingerz's players was ruled ineligible. GDF were also awarded the match 3–0.)	Qualification to Genesis playoff round	—	3–0	0–0	1–0	0–3	4–0	5–0	3–0
2	Pele	14	8	3	3	28	15	+13	27	Qualification to Genesis playoff round	1–1	—	2–2	0–0	2–1	3–1	2–1	1–3
3	Alpha United	14	7	5	2	22	12	+10	26	Qualification to Genesis playoff round	0–1	0–3	—	2–0	3–0	2–0	2–0	1–0
4	Fruta Conquerors	14	5	5	4	18	19	−1	20	Qualification to Genesis playoff round	3–3	1–2	0–3	—	2–2	0–0	4–2	2–1
5	Guyana Defence Force	14	5	2	7	22	23	−1	17		2–4	2–1	1–1	1–2	—	1–2	1–2	2–1
6	Buxton United	14	4	1	9	10	23	−13	13		0–2	0–2	3–4	0–1	0–1	—	2–1	1–0
7	Georgetown	14	3	3	8	13	30	−17	12		0–0	0–6	1–1	2–2	0–3	2–0	—	1–2
8	Monedderlust	14	3	1	10	11	22	−11	10		0–2	0–3	1–1	0–1	3–2	0–1	0–1	—

Source: Soccerway
Legend: Blue = home team win; Yellow = draw; Red = away team win.
Rules for classification: 1) Points; 2) Goal difference; 3) Goals scored

=== Genesis playoff round ===
The top 4 teams from the Genesis regular season advanced to the playoffs. The semifinals were played on 25 November, and the final was played on 29 November.

Semifinals
1	Slingerz	2
4	Fruta Conquerors	0
2	Pele	1
3	Alpha United	3

Finals
1	Slingerz	3
3	Alpha United	2
Third place
4	Fruta Conquerors	0
2	Pele	1

==== Semifinals ====
The two semifinal winners advanced to the Genesis round final.

25 November 2015

Slingerz	2–0	Fruta Conquerors
82' Mills; 90+3' Abrams

Guyana Defence Force Ground, Georgetown

25 November 2015

Pele	1–3	Alpha United
Richardson		Lanferman; Bain; Peters

Guyana Defence Force Ground, Georgetown

==== Third-place match ====
29 November 2015

Pele	1–0	Fruta Conquerors

Leonora Stadium, Leonora

==== Final ====
The winners of the Genesis round final were assured of a spot in the 2017 CFU Club Championship and the Champion of Champions game.

29 November 2015

Slingerz	3–2	Alpha United

Leonora Stadium, Leonora

== Finale round ==
The Finale round consisted of 14 rounds from 12 February to 4 June 2016. Each team played the other 7 teams twice each. The top 4 teams advanced to the playoffs.

=== Finale table ===
Pos	Team	Pld	W	D	L	GF	GA	GD	Pts	Qualification or relegation	SLI	FRU	ALP	PEL	GDF	BUX	MON	GEO
1	Slingerz	14	13	1	0	42	8	+34	40	Qualification to Finale playoff round	—	8–1	1–1	1–0	7–1	2–1	4–0	2–1
2	Fruta Conquerors	14	11	1	2	34	22	+12	34	Qualification to Finale playoff round	0–2	—	3–1	2–1	5–2	2–1	2–1	6–2
3	Alpha United	14	9	3	2	36	11	+25	30	Qualification to Finale playoff round	1–2	1–1	—	3–0	3–1	2–0	3–1	3–1
4	Pele	14	5	2	7	15	20	−5	17	Qualification to Finale playoff round	1–2	0–2	0–5	—	0–1	1–0	2–1	1–1
5	Guyana Defence Force	14	5	2	7	23	29	−6	17		1–2	1–2	1–1	1–3	—	1–0	4–2	5–1
6	Buxton United	14	3	2	9	12	22	−10	11		0–2	1–2	0–3	0–0	0–2	—	3–2	3–2
7	Monedderlust	14	1	3	10	12	37	−25	6		0–5	1–4	0–4	1–4	1–1	1–1	—	1–0
8	Georgetown	14	1	2	11	10	35	−25	5		0–2	0–2	0–5	0–2	2–1	0–2	0–0	—

Source: Soccerway
Legend: Blue = home team win; Yellow = draw; Red = away team win.
Rules for classification: 1) Points; 2) Goal difference; 3) Goals scored

=== Finale playoff round ===
The top 4 teams from the Finale regular season advanced to the playoffs.

Semifinals
1	Slingerz	3
4	Pele	1
2	Fruta Conquerors	0
3	Alpha United	4

Finals
1	Slingerz	0 (0)
3	Alpha United	0 (3)
Third place
4	Pele	2
2	Fruta Conquerors	3

==== Semifinals ====
The two semifinal winners advanced to the Finale round final.

10 June 2016

Slingerz	3–1	Pele

Leonora Stadium, Leonora

10 June 2016

Fruta Conquerors	0–4	Alpha United

Leonora Stadium, Leonora

==== Third-place match ====
19 June 2016

Fruta Conquerors	3–2	Pele

Leonora Stadium, Leonora

==== Final ====
The winners of the Finale round final were assured of a spot in the 2017 CFU Club Championship and the Champion of Champions game.

19 June 2016

Slingerz	0–0	Alpha United
Penalties
	0–3

Leonora Stadium, Leonora

== Champion of Champions ==
Slingerz (champions of the Genesis round) faced Alpha United (champions of the Finale round) in the Champion of Champions game to determine the season's overall champion.

26 June 2016

Slingerz	1–0	Alpha United

Leonora Stadium, Leonora
1. Match was to be held at Guyana Defence Force Ground in Georgetown, but was moved due to inclement weather.
