= Dwain Jacobs =

Guyanese footballer

Personal information
- Full name: Dwain Donald Jacobs
- Date of birth: 28 January 1987 (age 39)
- Place of birth: Golden Grove, Guyana
- Height: 1.85 m (6 ft 1 in)
- Position: Midfielder

Senior career*
Years	Team	Apps	(Gls)
- Pele FC
2007	Police		
2008–2012	Alpha United		
2012–2013	Buxton United		
2013–2014	Slingerz		
2014–2015	Alpha United		
2015–2017	Slingerz		
2017–2018	Police		
2018	Ann's Grove		
2019–2021	Dynamics FC		

International career
2008–2017	Guyana	42	(1)
- * Club domestic league appearances and goals

Dwain Donald Jacobs (born 28 January 1987) is a Guyanese former professional footballer who played as a midfielder. As of 2021, he is the president of Guyanese club Dynamics FC, which he founded in January 2019.

== Club career ==
In early 2013, Jacobs moved to the newly-formed Slingerz. He would then go on to transfer from Slingerz FC to Alpha United in January 2014. In January 2015, Jacobs returned to Slingerz.

== International career ==
Jacobs made his international debut for Guyana in a 1–0 friendly win over Saint Vincent and the Grenadines on 13 January 2008. He would go on to make 42 appearances and score one goal for Guyana from 2008 to 2017.

=== International goals ===
Guyana score listed first, score column indicates score after the Jacobs goal.

International goals by date, venue, opponent, score, result and competition
No.	Cap	Date	Venue	Opponent	Score	Result	Competition	Ref.
1	18	27 November 2010	Stade Alfred Marie-Jeanne, Rivière-Pilote, Guadeloupe, France	Guadeloupe	1–1	1–1	Caribbean Cup	

== Honours ==
Alpha United

- GFF National Super League: 2009, 2010, 2011–12

Buxton United

- Kashif & Shanghai Knockout Tournament: 2012–13
