= 2016–17 GFF Elite League =

GFF Elite League
- Season: 2016-17
- Champions: Guyana Defence Force FC
- Top goalscorer: (Guyana) Sherwin Caesar (10 goals)

The 2016–17 GFF Elite League (known as the 2016–17 Stag Elite League for sponsorship reasons) is the 16th season of the highest competitive football league in Guyana, and the 2nd season of the Elite League. Eight FIFA licensed clubs participated in the inaugural Elite League season.

Slingerz are the defending champions, but are not participating in the league this season, due to being in bad standing with the Guyana Football Federation.

== Teams ==
Cities of teams playing in the 2015–16 GFF Elite League

Team	City
Buxton United	Buxton
Fruta Conquerors	Georgetown
Guyana Defence Force	Georgetown
Monedderlust	Zee Lust
Top XX	Linden
Victoria Kings	Georgetown

Alpha United and Slingerz withdrew from the competition and were thus deemed to be in bad standing with the Guyana Football Federation.

== Standings ==
Pos	Team	Pld	W	D	L	GF	GA	GD	Pts	Qualification or relegation
1	GDF FC	10	9	0	1	36	8	+28	27	Champions
2	Fruta Conquerors	10	8	1	1	25	7	+18	25	
3	Victoria Kings	10	4	2	4	13	22	−9	14	
4	Buxton United	10	4	1	5	18	17	+1	13	
5	Topp XX	10	1	2	7	10	29	−19	5	Relegated
6	Monedderlust FC	10	1	0	9	8	27	−19	3	Relegated

Source: rsssf.com

== Top scorers ==
Rank	Player	Club	Goals
1	(Guyana) Sherwin Caesar	Defence Force	10
2	(Guyana) Eon Alleyne	Fruta Conquerors	7
3	(Guyana) Delroy Fraser	Defence Force	5
3	(Guyana) Olvis Mitchell	Guyana Defence Force	5
3	(Guyana) Dillon Wright	Buxton United	5
6	(Guyana) Travis Waterton	Topp XX	4
6	(Guyana) William Europea	Buxton United	4
6	(Guyana) Jermaine Junior	Fruta Conquerors	4
6	(Guyana) Devor Dennis	Buxton United	4
10	(Guyana) Kwamie Lafleur	Fruta Conquerors	2

== Attendances ==
#	Football club	Average attendance
1	GDF FC	243
2	Fruta Conquerors	225
3	Victoria Kings	172
4	Buxton United	165
5	Topp XX	138
6	Monedderlust FC	123
