= Jobe Caesar =

Guyanese footballer

Personal information
- Date of birth: 1999 (age 26–27)
- Place of birth: St. Cuthbert's Mission, Guyana
- Position: Midfielder

Team information
- Current team: Guyana Defence Force

Youth career
- Santos

Senior career*
Years	Team	Apps	(Gls)
2016–2017	Santos		
- Fruta Conquerors
- Santos
2021–	Guyana Defence Force		

International career^{‡}
- Guyana U17
2018	Guyana U20	4	(0)
2021–	Guyana	5	(0)
- * Club domestic league appearances and goals ‡ National team caps and goals as of 18:58, 12 September 2021 (UTC)

Jobe Caesar (born 1999) is a Guyanese professional footballer who plays as a midfielder for GFF Elite League club Guyana Defence Force and the Guyana national team.

== Early life ==
Caesar started playing football at the age of 8, and it was at Santos that his skills were "honed and fine-tuned". When he was young, he was a resident of Bent Street, Wortmanville in Georgetown, where he played with future Guyana international Daniel Wilson. "We used to go opposite Cuffy Square at that small field which was there to play with Daniel Wilson and a small group in the afternoons and evenings", recalled Caesar in an interview with Kaieteur Sport in 2021.

Caesar attended St. Sidewell's Primary School, which is situated opposite the field where he started playing football. He later attended St. Mary's Secondary School and Chase's Academy, securing a football scholarship at the latter.

== Club career ==
Caesar began his professional career at Santos. He went on to sign for Fruta Conquerors, where he won the GFF Elite League on two occasions. After his Fruta Conquerors spell, he returned to Santos before making a move to the Guyana Defence Force in 2021.

== International career ==
A former Guyana youth international at under-17 and under-20 level, Caesar made his debut for the senior Guyana national team in a 3–0 loss to Trinidad and Tobago on 25 March 2021 in FIFA World Cup qualification.

== Honours ==
Fruta Conquerors

- GFF Elite League: 2017–18, 2019
