= List of football clubs in Guyana =

This is a list of association football clubs in Guyana.

== The football clubs ==
- Alpha United (Providence)
- Bakewell Topp XX (Linden)
- Buxton United (East Demerara)
- Camptown (Georgetown)
- Fruta Conquerors FC (Georgetown)
- Guyana Defence Force (Georgetown)
- Liquid Gold (Bartica)
- Milerock (Linden)
- New Amsterdam United
- Rosignol United (Berbice)
- Seawall (West Demerara)
- Slingerz FC (East Bank Demerara)
- Victoria Kings (East Demerara)
- Western Tigers (Georgetown)
