= List of Trinidadian football transfers 2010–11 =

Trinidadian football transfers

This is a list of Trinidadian football transfers during the 2010–11 season. Only moves featuring at least one TT Pro League club are listed. Transfers that were made following the conclusion of the 2009 season on 27 October 2009 and during the 2010–11 season, which ran until 1 February 2011, are listed.

Players without a club cannot join one at any time, either during or in between transfer windows. Clubs within or outside the Pro League may sign players on loan at any time. If need be, clubs may sign a goalkeeper on an emergency loan, if all others are unavailable.

== Transfers ==
All players and clubs without with a flag are from Trinidad and Tobago. In addition, transfers involving Major League Soccer clubs in the United States and Canada technically have the league as the second party and not the listed club. MLS player contracts are owned by the league and not by individual clubs.

Date	Player	Moving from	Moving to	Fee
16 December 2009	(Guyana) Vurlon Mills	W Connection	(Guyana) Fruta Conquerors	Loan
19 December 2009	(Guyana) Collie Hercules	Tobago United	(Guyana) Bakewell Topp XX	Loan
19 December 2009	(Guyana) Kayode McKinnon	Tobago United	(Guyana) Bakewell Topp XX	Loan
19 December 2009	(Guyana) Richard Reynolds	Tobago United	(Guyana) Bakewell Topp XX	Loan
19 December 2009	Akim Armstrong	Caledonia AIA	(Guyana) Alpha United FC	Loan
19 December 2009	Keyon Edwards	Caledonia AIA	(Guyana) Alpha United FC	Loan
19 December 2009	(Guyana) Walter Moore	Caledonia AIA	(Guyana) Alpha United FC	Loan
20 December 2009	(Guyana) Tichard Joseph	Tobago United	(Guyana) Victoria Kings	Loan
23 December 2009	David Alleyne	Defence Force	(Guyana) Defence Force	Loan
23 December 2009	Kevon Carter	Defence Force	(Guyana) Defence Force	Loan
23 December 2009	Aklie Edwards	Defence Force	(Guyana) Defence Force	Loan
23 December 2009	Devorn Jorsling	Defence Force	(Guyana) Defence Force	Loan
25 December 2009	Seon Power	Joe Public	Ma Pau	Free
25 December 2009	Devon Jamerson	Unattached	Ma Pau	Free
25 December 2009	Elton John	Unattached	Ma Pau	Free
25 December 2009	Nigel Daniel	United Petrotrin	Joe Public	Free
30 December 2009	Andre Toussaint	Unattached	Joe Public	Free
31 December 2009	(Colombia) Alejandro Figueroa	Joe Public	Ma Pau	Free
31 December 2009	Lester Peltier	Unattached	Ma Pau	Free
31 December 2009	Joel Leslie Russell	San Juan Jabloteh	Ma Pau	Free
4 January 2010	Keyeno Thomas	Joe Public	Ma Pau	Free
4 January 2010	Kevin Molino	San Juan Jabloteh	Ma Pau	Undisclosed
4 January 2010	Mekeil Williams	San Juan Jabloteh	Ma Pau	Undisclosed
7 January 2010	(Guyana) Charles Pollard	Caledonia AIA	Joe Public	Free
7 January 2010	Marcus Ambrose	Unattached	Joe Public	Free
14 January 2010	Marvin Phillip	W Connection	Joe Public	Loan
20 January 2010	Cordell Cato	St. Anthony's College	San Juan Jabloteh	Free
21 January 2010	Shane Calderon	Valtrin United	Ma Pau	Free
21 January 2010	Cyd Gray	United Petrotrin	Ma Pau	Free
23 January 2010	Josh Johnson	San Juan Jabloteh	(Wales) Airbus U.K. Broughton	Undisclosed
17 February 2010	Sayid Freitas	Ma Pau	Joe Public	Free
17 February 2010	Makan Hislop	United Petrotrin	Joe Public	Free
17 February 2010	Trent Lougheed	United Petrotrin	Joe Public	Free
17 February 2010	Glenroy Samuel	United Petrotrin	Joe Public	Free
17 February 2010	Robbie Sookhai	Joe Public (SL)	Joe Public	Free
24 February 2010	(Saint Lucia) Vernus Abbott	(Saint Lucia) Aux Lyons United	W Connection	Free
24 February 2010	(Saint Lucia) Kurt Frederick	Unattached	W Connection	Free
24 February 2010	(Saint Lucia) Zaine Pierre	(Saint Lucia) Vieux Fort Comprehensive	W Connection	Free
24 February 2010	(Saint Lucia) Pernal Williams	Unattached	W Connection	Free
24 February 2010	(Dominican Republic) Jonathan Faña	W Connection	Puerto Rico Islanders	Loan
24 February 2010	Andre Marchan	W Connection	Joe Public	Loan
2 March 2010	Aurtis Whitley	United Petrotrin	San Juan Jabloteh	Free
3 March 2010	Kennedy Hinkson	United Petrotrin	San Juan Jabloteh	Free
15 March 2010	Jean-Luc Rochford	1.FC Santa Rosa	Caledonia AIA	Loan
19 March 2010	Juma Clarence	United Petrotrin	(Turkey) Hacettepe Spor Kulübü	Free
23 March 2010	Kevaughn Connell	San Juan Jabloteh	(China) Nanchang Bayi	Free
1 April 2010	(United States) Daniel Bulls	(United States) Real Maryland Monarchs	Joe Public	Free
1 April 2010	Radanfah Abu Bakr	Caledonia AIA	Joe Public	Free
6 April 2010	Leslie Fitzpatrick	(United States) Rochester Rhinos	North East Stars	Free
6 April 2010	(Jamaica) Sean Fraser	Unattached	North East Stars	Free
10 April 2010	(Jamaica) Lamar Hodges	(Jamaica) Harbour View	Joe Public	Free
10 April 2010	Mikhail Awai	Unattached	San Juan Jabloteh	Free
10 April 2010	Christon Thomas	St. Ann's Rangers	San Juan Jabloteh	Free
13 April 2010	Gary Glasgow	United Petrotrin	North East Stars	Free
13 April 2010	Errol McFarlane	(United States) Rochester Rhinos	North East Stars	Free
13 April 2010	Jason Devenish	(Canada) Victoria Highlanders	North East Stars	Free
13 April 2010	(Brazil) Ronaldo Viana	(Brazil) Trindade Atlético Clube	San Juan Jabloteh	Free
16 April 2010	Keon Daniel	Caledonia AIA	Puerto Rico Islanders	Undisclosed
17 April 2010	Arnold Dwarika	United Petrotrin	North East Stars	Free
17 April 2010	(Jamaica) Kimarley McDonald	(Jamaica) Boys' Town	North East Stars	Free
17 April 2010	Glenton Wolfe	San Juan Jabloteh	North East Stars	Free
20 April 2010	Odelle Armstrong	Caledonia AIA	St. Ann's Rangers	Free
20 April 2010	Beville Joseph	Joe Public	St. Ann's Rangers	Free
20 April 2010	Jevon Morris	St. Ann's Rangers	Joe Public	Free
20 April 2010	Joseph Peters	Unattached	St. Ann's Rangers	Free
20 April 2010	Kaashif Thomas	Unattached	St. Ann's Rangers	Free
20 April 2010	Glen Walker	Harvard	St. Ann's Rangers	Free
20 April 2010	Daurance Williams	Unattached	St. Ann's Rangers	Free
20 April 2010	Kwame Wiltshire	United Petrotrin	St. Ann's Rangers	Free
22 April 2010	Akiel Guevara	Joe Public	North East Stars	Free
22 April 2010	(Guyana) Carey Harris	Tobago United	North East Stars	Free
22 April 2010	(Guyana) Randolph Jerome	Unattached	North East Stars	Free
22 April 2010	(Belize) Mark Leslie	Ma Pau	North East Stars	Free
22 April 2010	(Saint Vincent and the Grenadines) Winslow McDowell	Unattached	North East Stars	Free
22 April 2010	(Guyana) Charles Pollard	Joe Public	North East Stars	Free
22 April 2010	Brent Sancho	(United States) Rochester Rhinos	North East Stars	Free
22 April 2010	Michael Woods	Joe Public	North East Stars	Free
23 April 2010	Kemmuel Rivers	W Connection	Ma Pau	Free
23 April 2010	(Brazil) Paulo Roberto Santana	Unattached	W Connection	Free
23 April 2010	Corneal Thomas	St. Ann's Rangers	Ma Pau	Free
1 May 2010	Kevaughn Connell	(China) Nanchang Bayi	North East Stars	Free
13 May 2010	(Colombia) Carlos González	Unattached	North East Stars	Free
21 May 2010	Alex Balfour	Golden Lane	Tobago United	Free
21 May 2010	Dwayne Jack	Unattached	Tobago United	Free
21 May 2010	Azel Taylor	Golden Lane	Tobago United	Free
21 May 2010	Benton Charles	Castara Goal City	Tobago United	Free
21 May 2010	Pavel Warrick	Speyside	Tobago United	Free
21 May 2010	Kevon Woodley	Charlotteville	Tobago United	Free
2 June 2010	(Colombia) Julian Martinez Sanchez	(Colombia) Girardot Néctar	St. Ann's Rangers	Free
3 June 2010	Ashford Legerton	Unattached	Tobago United	Free
3 June 2010	Jevaughn Vance	Joe Public	1.FC Santa Rosa	Free
5 June 2010	(Colombia) Milton Gomez	Unattached	North East Stars	Free
28 June 2010	Dwight Crichlow	Valtrin United	Caledonia AIA	Free
1 July 2010	Andell Noray	1976 FC Phoenix	Joe Public	Free
2 July 2010	Keyon Edwards	Unattached	Caledonia AIA	Free
18 August 2010	(Antigua and Barbuda) Gayson Gregory	(Antigua and Barbuda) Old Road	Joe Public	Free
26 August 2010	Noel Williams	San Juan Jabloteh	Police	Free
17 September 2010	Kerwyn Navarro	W Connection	North East Stars	Free
17 September 2010	Anthony Wolfe	Ma Pau	North East Stars	Free
30 September 2010	(Brazil) Ronaldo Viana	San Juan Jabloteh	(Antigua and Barbuda) Parham	Free
10 October 2010	Silvio Spann	(Wales) Wrexham	W Connection	Free
21 November 2010	(Guyana) Trayon Bobb	Unattached	Caledonia AIA	Free
19 January 2011	Leslie Fitzpatrick	North East Stars	Ma Pau	Free
20 January 2011	Curtis Gonzales	Ma Pau	Defence Force	Free
20 January 2011	Glenroy Samuel	Joe Public	Defence Force	Free
27 January 2011	Devorn Jorsling	Defence Force	(United States) Orlando City	Free
27 January 2011	Clayton Ince	Unattached	Ma Pau	Free
