= Kelsey Benjamin =

Guyanese footballer

Personal information
- Full name: Kelsey The First Benjamin
- Date of birth: 8 May 1999 (age 27)
- Place of birth: Georgetown, Guyana
- Height: 1.68 m (5 ft 6 in)
- Position: Midfielder

Team information
- Current team: Guyana Defence Force

Senior career*
Years	Team	Apps	(Gls)
2015–2016	Buxton United		
2016–2017	Georgetown		
2017	Morvant Caledonia United		
2017–2018	Grove Hi-Tech		
2018	Georgetown		
2018	Western Tigers		
2019–2020	Morvant Caledonia United		
2021–	Guyana Defence Force		

International career^{‡}
2017–	Guyana	37	(7)
- * Club domestic league appearances and goals ‡ National team caps and goals as of 11 June 2025

Kelsey The First Benjamin (born 8 May 1999) is a Guyanese professional footballer who plays as a midfielder for GFF Elite League club Guyana Defence Force and the Guyana national team.

== International career ==
Benjamin represents Guyana at international level. His first goal with the national team came in a 3–1 loss to Suriname on 16 March 2019.

=== International goals ===
Guyana score listed first, score column indicates score after the Benjamin goal.

List of international goals scored by Kelsey Benjamin
No.	Cap	Date	Venue	Opponent	Score	Result	Competition	Ref.
1	4	16 March 2019	Ashraf Pierkhan Stadion, Nieuw Nickerie, Guyana	Suriname	3–1	3–1	Friendly	
2	17	18 April 2022	Stade Georges-Chaumet, Cayenne, Guyana	French Guiana	1–0	2–1	Friendly	
3	25	9 September 2023	Sir Vivian Richards Stadium, St. John's, Antigua and Barbuda	Antigua and Barbuda	3–0	5–1	2023–24 CONCACAF Nations League B	
4	26	12 September 2023	Synthetic Track and Field Facility, Leonora, Guyana	Bahamas	3–1	3–2	2023–24 CONCACAF Nations League B	
