= 2019 GFF Elite League =

GFF Elite League
- Season: 2019
- Champions: Fruta Conquerors FC
- Relegated: Victoria Kings FC; Ann's Grove United
- Top goalscorer: (Guyana) Delon Lanferman (9 Goals)

The 2019 GFF Elite League was the 18th season of the GFF Elite League, the top-tier football in Guyana. The season started on 15 March 2019. Many games took place at the 2,000-capacity Georgetown Football Stadium.

== League table ==
Pos	Team	Pld	W	D	L	GF	GA	GD	Pts	Qualification or relegation
1	Fruta Conquerors (C)	9	9	0	0	43	5	+38	27	Caribbean Club Shield
2	Western Tigers	9	6	2	1	21	9	+12	20	
3	Den Amstel	9	5	2	2	23	13	+10	17	
4	Guyana Defence Force	9	4	2	3	14	10	+4	14	
5	Buxton United	9	3	2	4	9	11	−2	11	
6	Santos	9	3	1	5	11	19	−8	10	
7	Police	9	2	2	5	7	12	−5	8	
8	Milerock	9	2	3	4	8	16	−8	6 (Note: Milerock deducted 3 points.)	
9	Victoria Kings (R)	9	2	1	6	12	29	−17	4 (Note: Victoria Kings deducted 3 points.)	Relegated to Regional leagues
10	Ann's Grove United (R)	9	1	1	7	2	26	−24	4	Relegated to Regional leagues

Source: Soccerway
(C) Champions; (R) Relegated

== Top scorers ==
Rank	Player	Club	Goals
1	(Guyana) Delon Lanferman	Den Amstel	9
2	(Guyana) Nicholas	Fruta Conquerors	8
2	(Guyana) Gregory	Fruta Conquerors	8
4	(Guyana) Eon Alleyne	Fruta Conquerors	7
4	(Guyana) Ryan Hackett	Fruta Conquerors	7
4	(Guyana) Randolph Wagner	Western Tigers	7
7	(Guyana) Kester Jacobs	Den Amstel	5
8	(Guyana) David George	Santos	4
9	(Guyana) Andrew Murray	Western Tigers	3
9	(Guyana) Omari Glasgow	Buxton United	3
