= Jeremy Garrett =

Guyanese footballer (born 2000)

Personal information
- Date of birth: 1 January 2000 (age 26)
- Place of birth: Georgetown, Guyana
- Height: 1.88 m (6 ft 2 in)
- Position: Defender

Team information
- Current team: Guyana Defence Force

College career
Years	Team	Apps	(Gls)
2018–2019	LSU Eunice Bengals	24	(0)

Senior career*
Years	Team	Apps	(Gls)
2017–2018	Fruta Conquerors	9	(0)
?-2021	Guyana Defence Force		

International career^{‡}
2018	Guyana U20	3	(1)
2017–	Guyana	7	(1)
- * Club domestic league appearances and goals as of 12:57, 17 March 2021 (UTC) ‡ National team caps and goals as of 16:14, 11 March 2024 (UTC)

Jeremy Garrett (born 1 January 2000) is a Guyana international footballer who plays as a defender for the Guyana Defence Force.

In 2018, Garrett secured a scholarship with Louisiana State University at Eunice and studies Rehabilitation Science as of June 2020.

In 2020 he was selected to play for the Guyana national team as a central defender.

In January 2021, he officially left Fruta Conquerors for Guyana Defence Force team, seeking a more professional training program.

== Career statistics ==
=== Club ===
Club	Season	League			Cup		Other		Total	
Club	Season	Division	Apps	Goals	Apps	Goals	Apps	Goals	Apps	Goals
Fruta Conquerors	2017–18	GFF Elite League	9	0	0	0	0	0	9	0
Career total			9	0	0	0	0	0	9	0

=== International ===
As of matches played 17 March 2021.

National team	Year	Apps	Goals
Guyana	2017	1	0
Total		1	0
