= Nicholas McArthur =

Guyanese footballer

Personal information
- Full name: Nicholas Douglas McArthur
- Date of birth: 21 December 2001 (age 24)
- Place of birth: Georgetown, Guyana
- Height: 1.74 m (5 ft 9 in)
- Position: Right midfielder

Team information
- Current team: Police

Senior career*
Years	Team	Apps	(Gls)
2017–2021	Fruta Conquerors	22	(9)
2021	Portmore United	5	(0)
2023–	Police		

International career^{‡}
2018	Guyana U20	4	(0)
2019–	Guyana	6	(0)
- * Club domestic league appearances and goals ‡ National team caps and goals as of 10:52, 20 February 2026 (UTC)

Nicholas Douglas McArthur (born 21 December 2001) is a Guyanese professional footballer who plays as a right midfielder for GFF Elite League club Police and the Guyana national team.

== Club career ==
In June 2021, McArthur signed for Jamaican club Portmore United. He signed a two-year contract with the club.

== International career ==
McArthur made his debut for the Guyana national team in a 4–2 win over Aruba in the CONCACAF Nations League B on 15 November 2019.

== Honours ==
Fruta Conquerors

- GFF Elite League: 2017–18, 2019
