= 2017–18 GFF Elite League =

GFF Elite League
- Season: 2017–18
- Champions: Fruta Conquerors FC
- Caribbean Club Shield: Fruta Conquerors FC
- Top goalscorer: (Guyana) Delon Lanferman (19 goals)

The 2017–18 GFF Elite League was the 17th season of the highest competitive football league in Guyana, and the 3rd season of the Elite League. Topp XX and Monedderlust FC who finished the previous season at the bottom of the table, were replaced by Den Amstel FC, Western Tigers FC (Georgetown), Milerock FC (Linden), Ann's Grove United FC, New Amsterdam United FC and Cougars FC (Berbice).

The season began on the 19 November 2017 and ended on the 21 September 2018 with Cougars in last and automatically related and New Amsterdam United finishing in 9th and entering the relegation playoff. New Amsterdam United would go on to play Soesdyke Falcons, who were champions of the East Bank FA, where the game finished 3-3 before Soesdyke Falcons won 5-4 on penalties, relegating New Amsterdam United.

== Standings ==
Pos	Team	Pld	W	D	L	GF	GA	GD	Pts	Qualification or relegation
1	Fruta Conquerors	18	14	3	1	50	6	+44	45	Champions
2	Guyana Defence Force FC	18	12	4	2	40	13	+27	40	
3	Den Amstel	18	12	3	3	47	12	+35	39	
4	Western Tigers	18	11	5	2	31	15	+16	38	
5	Victoria Kings FC	18	7	3	8	26	27	−1	24	
6	Buxton United	18	5	5	8	17	27	−10	20	
7	Milerock	18	4	3	11	19	33	−14	15	
8	Ann's Grove United	18	3	5	10	20	35	−15	14	
9	New Amsterdam United	18	2	4	12	8	38	−30	10	Qualification to relegation play-offs
10	Cougars	18	2	1	15	10	62	−52	7	Relegation to lower division

== Top scorers ==
Rank	Player	Club	Goals
1	(Guyana) Delon Lanferman	Den Amstel	19
2	(Guyana) Aubrey Gibson	Victoria Kings	13
3	(Guyana) Eon Alleyne	Fruta Conquerors	10
4	(Guyana) Ryan Hackett	Fruta Conquerors	9
4	(Nigeria) Benjamin Opara	Defence Force	9
6	(Guyana) Gideon Payne	Den Amstel	8
7	(Guyana) Daniel Wilson	Western Tigers	7
7	(Guyana) Hubert Pedro	Western Tigers	7
9	(Guyana) Mark Wronge	Cougars	6
9	(Guyana) Anthony Abrams	Fruta Conquerors	6
