= Omari Glasgow =

Guyanese footballer (born 2003)

Personal information
- Full name: Omari Nkosi Matthew Glasgow
- Date of birth: 22 November 2003 (age 22)
- Place of birth: Beterverwagting, Guyana
- Height: 1.75 m (5 ft 9 in)
- Position: Forward

Team information
- Current team: Monterey Bay (on loan from Chicago Fire)
- Number: 17

Senior career*
Years	Team	Apps	(Gls)
2021–2022	Western Tigers FC		
2022–2024	Chicago Fire FC II	57	(15)
2024	→ Chicago Fire FC (loan)	2	(0)
2025–	Chicago Fire FC	16	(0)
2025	→ Loudoun United (loan)	12	(0)
2025	→ Slingerz FC (loan)	0	(0)
2026–	→ Monterey Bay FC (loan)	26	(2)

International career^{‡}
2021–	Guyana	42	(27)
- * Club domestic league appearances and goals as of 24 October 2026 ‡ National team caps and goals as of 20:50, 12 November 2026 (UTC)

Omari Nkosi Matthew Glasgow (born 22 November 2003) is a Guyanese professional footballer who plays as a forward for Monterey Bay FC in the USL Championship, on loan from MLS club Chicago Fire, and the Guyana national team.

He is the Guyana national team all-time top goalscorer.

== Club career ==
Glasgow started his career with Guyanese side Western Tigers FC.

On 24 March 2022, it was announced that Glasgow had signed for MLS Next Pro club Chicago Fire FC II, the reserve team of Chicago Fire FC of Major League Soccer. The deal was for an initial two years with a club option to extend through 2024.

On 8 May 2022, he played his first game with Chicago Fire FC II, a 0–0 draw with Minnesota United 2 in the 2022 MLS Next Pro season.

One week later, on 15 May 2022, in a 2022 MLS Next Pro game against Cincinnati 2, he scored his first goal with Chicago Fire II in a 3–1 win.

In May 2024, he was loaned to the Chicago Fire FC first team for two games. On 4 May 2024, he made his first appearance for Chicago Fire FC by playing a MLS game against New England Revolution, Chicago lost 1–0. On 16 May 2024, he played his second game as planned, a MLS game against Charlotte FC, lost by Chicago 1–0. On 29 July, he was again loaned to the first team, this time for one game only, a 2024 Leagues Cup group stage defeat 2–1 to Sporting Kansas City. It was his third game for the first team, and his Leagues Cup debut.

On 17 December 2024, after 62 games and 15 goals with Chicago Fire FC II, Glasgow was permanently transferred to Chicago Fire.

On 7 May 2025, Glasgow scored his first goal with Chicago Fire FC in the round of 32 of the 2025 US Open Cup against Detroit City FC, Chicago winning the game 4–0.

On 7 August 2025, he was loaned to US second tier side Loudoun United for the reminder of the 2025 season.

Two days later, on 9 August 2025, he played his first game with Loundoun United, against Rhode Island FC in the 2025 USL Championship season; it was also his first game in USL Championship, the second tier in United States league system.

On 2 December 2025 it was announced that Glasgow will play as a "guest player" (Note: with the approval of Chicago Fire FC) with Guyanese side Slingerz FC during the year-end GFF Super-16 Tournament which will start on 6 December 2025 and end on 1 January 2026.

On February 18, 2026, it was announced that Glasgow would join USL Championship side Monterey Bay FC on loan for the 2026 season.

== International career ==
Glasgow debuted internationally with the Guyana U-17 team on 5 January 2019, in a 2019 CONCACAF U-17 Championship qualifying match held in the United States, in a 4–0 defeat to El Salvador. He also appeared in 2020 CONCACAF U-20 Championship qualifying.

On 30 March 2021, in a 2022 FIFA World Cup qualifier, Glasgow made his senior debut, and scored his first goal for Guyana against Bahamas in a 4–0 victory, becoming at 17 years and 4 months Guyana's youngest known player and goalscorer ever.

On 5 June 2022, in a 2–1 win over Montserrat in the 2022–23 CONCACAF Nations League, he netted a brace to become at 18 years and 6 months Guyana's youngest goalscorer ever in CONCACAF Nations League.

He was named to the 23-man squad for the 2023 CONCACAF Gold Cup qualification tournament on June 13, 2023. He was recalled for Guyana's 2023–24 CONCACAF Nations League B campaign. He scored seven goals in five matches, including at least one goal in each of the nation's games, en route to earning the competition's top goalscorer award. He was also named the tournament's best young player.

On 15 November 2024, in a 4–1 win against Barbados during the first leg of the 2024–25 CONCACAF Nations League Play-in, he netted his 18th and 19th goals, surpassing Nigel Codrington tally of 18 goals to become Guyana's all-time top goalscorer.

== Career statistics ==
=== Club ===
As of match played 24 October 2026

Appearances and goals by club, season and competition
Club	Season	League			Playoffs		National cup		Continental		Other		Total	
Club	Season	Division	Apps	Goals	Apps	Goals	Apps	Goals	Apps	Goals	Apps	Goals	Apps	Goals
Chicago Fire II	2022	MLS Next Pro	15	5	–		–		–		–		15	5
Chicago Fire II	2023	MLS Next Pro	21	5	1 (Note: appearance in 2023 MLS Next Pro playoffs)	0	–		–		–		22	5
Chicago Fire II	2024	MLS Next Pro	21	5	2 (Note: appearance in 2024 MLS Next Pro playoffs)	0	2	0	–		–		25	5
Chicago Fire II	Total		57	15	3	0	2	0	0	0	0	0	62	15
Chicago Fire (loan)	2024	Major League Soccer	2	0	0	0	–		–		1 (Note: appearance in 2024 Leagues Cup)	0	3	0
Chicago Fire	2025	Major League Soccer	14	0	–		2	1	–		–		16	1
Chicago Fire	Total		16	0	0	0	2	1	0	0	1	0	19	1
Loundoun United (loan)	2025	USL Championship	12	0	1 (Note: appearance in 2025 USL Championship playoffs)	0	–		–		1 (Note: appearance in 2025 USL Cup)	0	14	0
Slingerz FC (loan)	2025–2026	GFF Elite League	0	0	0	0	0	0	0	0	3 (Note: appearance in 2025 GFF Super-16 Tournament)	0	3	0
Monterey Bay FC (loan)	2026	USL Championship	26	2	0	0	0	0	–		2 (Note: appearances in 2026 USL Cup)	0	28	2
Career total			111	17	4	0	4	1	0	0	7	0	125	18

=== International ===
As of match played 12 November 2026

Scores and results list Guyana's goal tally first, score column indicates score after each Glasgow goal.

List of international goals scored by Omari Glasgow
No.	Date	Venue	Opponent	Score	Result	Competition
1	30 March 2021	Félix Sánchez Olympic Stadium, Santo Domingo, Dominican Republic	Bahamas	3–0	4–0	2022 FIFA World Cup qualification
2	27 March 2022	Hasely Crawford Stadium, Port of Spain, Trinidad and Tobago	Barbados	3–0	5–0	Friendly
3	27 March 2022	Hasely Crawford Stadium, Port of Spain, Trinidad and Tobago	Barbados	5–0	5–0	Friendly
4	4 June 2022	Félix Sánchez Olympic Stadium, Santo Domingo, Dominican Republic	Montserrat	1–1	2–1	2022–23 CONCACAF Nations League B
5	4 June 2022	Félix Sánchez Olympic Stadium, Santo Domingo, Dominican Republic	Montserrat	2–0	2–1	2022–23 CONCACAF Nations League B
6	7 June 2022	Synthetic Track and Field Facility, Leonora, Guyana	Bermuda	2–1	2–1	2022–23 CONCACAF Nations League B
7	17 June 2023	DRV PNK Stadium, Fort Lauderdale, United States	Grenada	1–0	1–1	2023 CONCACAF Gold Cup qualification
8	9 September 2023	Sir Vivian Richards Stadium, St. John's, Antigua and Barbuda	Antigua and Barbuda	1–0	5–1	2023–24 CONCACAF Nations League B
9	9 September 2023	Sir Vivian Richards Stadium, St. John's, Antigua and Barbuda	Antigua and Barbuda	2–0	5–1	2023–24 CONCACAF Nations League B
10	9 September 2023	Sir Vivian Richards Stadium, St. John's, Antigua and Barbuda	Antigua and Barbuda	5–1	5–1	2023–24 CONCACAF Nations League B
11	12 September 2023	Synthetic Track and Field Facility, Leonora, Guyana	Bahamas	1–1	3–2	2023–24 CONCACAF Nations League B
12	14 October 2023	SKNFA Technical Center, Basseterre, Saint Kitts and Nevis	Puerto Rico	1–1	3–1	2023–24 CONCACAF Nations League B
13	17 October 2023	SKNFA Technical Center, Basseterre, Saint Kitts and Nevis	Puerto Rico	3–1	3–1	2023–24 CONCACAF Nations League B
14	21 November 2023	Félix Sánchez Olympic Stadium, Santo Domingo, Dominican Republic	Antigua and Barbuda	2–0	6–0	2023–24 CONCACAF Nations League B
15	26 March 2024	Prince Abdullah Al-Faisal Sports City, Jeddah, Saudi Arabia	Cambodia	1–0	4–1	2024 FIFA Series
16	26 March 2024	Prince Abdullah Al-Faisal Sports City, Jeddah, Saudi Arabia	Cambodia	2–0	4–1	2024 FIFA Series
17	5 September 2024	Synthetic Track and Field Facility, Leonora, Guyana	Suriname	1–1	1–3	2024–25 CONCACAF Nations League A
18	15 November 2024	Wildey Turf, Bridgetown, Barbados	Barbados	1–1	4–1	2024–25 CONCACAF Nations League Play-in
19	15 November 2024	Wildey Turf, Bridgetown, Barbados	Barbados	2–1	4–1	2024–25 CONCACAF Nations League Play-in
20	19 November 2024	Synthetic Track and Field Facility, Leonora, Guyana	Barbados	4–1	5–3	2025 CONCACAF Gold Cup qualification play-in
21	10 June 2025	Synthetic Track and Field Facility, Leonora, Guyana	Montserrat	3–0	3-0	2026 FIFA World Cup qualification
22	18 November 2025	Sir Vivian Richards Stadium, North Sound, Antigua and Barbuda	Antigua and Barbuda	1–0	4–1	2025–26 CONCACAF Series
23	18 November 2025	Sir Vivian Richards Stadium, North Sound, Antigua and Barbuda	Antigua and Barbuda	2–0	4–1	2025–26 CONCACAF Series
24	1 October 2026	Mayagüez Athletics Stadium, Mayagüez, Puerto Rico	Dominica	1–0	5–1	2026–27 CONCACAF Nations League B
25	4 October 2026	Mayagüez Athletics Stadium, Mayagüez, Puerto Rico	Dominica	1–0	8–1	2026–27 CONCACAF Nations League B
26	4 October 2026	Mayagüez Athletics Stadium, Mayagüez, Puerto Rico	Dominica	4–0	8–1	2026–27 CONCACAF Nations League B
27	12 November 2026	Synthetic Track and Field Facility, Leonora, Guyana	Cayman Islands	1–0	6–0	2026–27 CONCACAF Nations League B

== Honours ==
Individual

- CONCACAF Nations League top scorer: 2023–24
