= Gregory Richardson =

Guyanese footballer

Personal information
- Full name: Gregory Fitzpatrick Richardson
- Date of birth: 16 June 1982 (age 44)
- Place of birth: Georgetown, Guyana
- Height: 5 ft 8 in (1.73 m)
- Position: Striker

Team information
- Current team: Alpha United

Senior career*
Years	Team	Apps	(Gls)
2001–2003	Georgetown FC		
2003–2004	Camptown Georgetown		
2004	Beacon		
2005	Pele		
2005–2006	Notre Dame		
2007–2008	Joe Public		(10)
2008–2009	Pele		
2009	Colorado Rapids	1	(0)
2009–2010	Carolina RailHawks	33	(10)
2011–2013	Puerto Rico Islanders	17	(2)
2013–2015	Alpha United		
2015–2018	Pele		
2018–	Fruta Conquerors		

International career^{‡}
2002–	Guyana	46	(17)
- * Club domestic league appearances and goals as of 9 April 2013 ‡ National team caps and goals as of 23:12, 11 October 2020 (UTC)

Gregory Fitzpatrick Richardson (born 16 June 1982) is a Guyanese professional footballer who plays as a striker for GFF Elite League club Fruta Conquerors and the Guyana national team.

== Career ==
=== Caribbean ===
Richardson formerly played for Georgetown FC and Camptown Georgetown in his home country, and for Joe Public from Trinidad and Tobago. While playing for Joe Public in the CONCACAF Champions League 2008–09 preliminary round he scored a hat-trick, helping his team eliminate New England Revolution, and bringing himself to international attention.

=== United States ===
Richardson signed for Colorado Rapids in early 2009, and made his MLS debut on 21 March 2009, Colorado's first game of the 2009 MLS season against Chivas USA.

He was waived by Colorado on 27 June 2009, only making one appearance for the club. After a successful trial with the Carolina RailHawks the club announced the signing of Richardson on 9 July 2009. He became an instant impact where he was able to register his first hat trick in a 4–0 victory over Miami FC. He scored the fastest goal in club history against Puerto Rico Islanders at the second minute. He finished off the season as tied in first for most assists with five, and was the second highest goal scorer with six goals. He helped his Carolina side clinch a playoff spot by finishing second in the regular season standings. On 5 February 2010 Carolina re-signed Richardson to a one-year deal with a club option for 2011.

Richardson was not listed on the 2011 roster for Carolina released on 4 April 2011. He was later signed by the Puerto Rico Islanders on 15 April.

After the Islanders went on hiatus he returned to Guyana to play for Alpha United, helping them reach the 2014–15 CONCACAF Champions League.

== International goals ==
Scores and results list Guyana's goal tally first.

No.	Date	Venue	Opponent	Score	Result	Competition
1.	15 February 2004	Barbados National Stadium, Waterford, Barbados	Barbados	2–0	2–0	Friendly
2.	13 February 2005	Barbados National Stadium, Waterford, Barbados	Barbados	1–1	3–3	Friendly
3.	6 September 2006	Ergilio Hato Stadium, Willemstad, Curaçao	Suriname	1–0	5–0	2007 Caribbean Cup qualification
4.	24 November 2006	Bourda, Georgetown, Guyana	Antigua and Barbuda	1–0	6–0	2007 Caribbean Cup qualification
5.	24 November 2006	Bourda, Georgetown, Guyana	Antigua and Barbuda	2–0	6–0	2007 Caribbean Cup qualification
6.	26 November 2006	Bourda, Georgetown, Guyana	Guadeloupe	2–0	3–2	2007 Caribbean Cup qualification
7.	28 November 2006	Bourda, Georgetown, Guyana	Dominican Republic	1–0	4–0	2007 Caribbean Cup qualification
8.	13 January 2008	Providence Stadium, Providence, Guyana	Saint Vincent and the Grenadines	1–0	1–0	Friendly
9.	5 November 2008	Marvin Lee Stadium, Macoya, Trinidad and Tobago	Saint Kitts and Nevis	1–1	1–1	2008 Caribbean Cup qualification
10.	9 November 2008	Marvin Lee Stadium, Macoya, Trinidad and Tobago	Trinidad and Tobago	1–0	1–1	2008 Caribbean Cup qualification
11.	11 September 2012	Providence Stadium, Providence, Guyana	El Salvador	1–0	2–3	2014 FIFA World Cup qualification
12.	21 October 2012	Beauséjour Stadium, Gros Islet, Saint Lucia	Saint Vincent and the Grenadines	1–1	1–2	2012 Caribbean Cup qualification
13.	23 October 2012	Beauséjour Stadium, Gros Islet, Saint Lucia	Curaçao	2–0	2–1	2012 Caribbean Cup qualification
14.	25 October 2012	Beauséjour Stadium, Gros Islet, Saint Lucia	Saint Lucia	3–0	3–0	2012 Caribbean Cup qualification
15.	21 February 2016	Providence Stadium, Providence, Guyana	Suriname	1–0	2–0	Friendly
16.	21 February 2016	Providence Stadium, Providence, Guyana	Suriname	2–0	2–0	Friendly
17.	22 March 2016	Providence Stadium, Providence, Guyana	Anguilla	5–0	7–0	2017 Caribbean Cup qualification

Note: Some sources have credited Richardson with scoring the first goal in a 5–0 victory over Netherlands Antilles in 2006, however this was actually scored by Nigel Codrington.
