= Anthony Abrams =

Guyanese footballer (born 1979)

Personal information
- Full name: Anthony Joseph Abrams
- Date of birth: January 26, 1979 (age 47)
- Place of birth: Georgetown, Guyana
- Height: 1.81 m (5 ft 11 1/2 in)
- Position: Forward

Team information
- Current team: Fruta Conquerors
- Number: 9

Senior career*
| Years | Team | Apps | (Gls) |
| 2001–2002 | Fruta Conquerors | ? | (?) |
| 2003–2005 | Bakewell Topp XX | ? | (?) |
| 2006 | Joe Public | ? | (?) |
| 2006 | Alpha United | ? | (?) |
| 2007 | Caledonia AIA | ? | (?) |
| 2007–2008 | Alpha United | ? | (?) |
| 2008–2009 | Leo Victor | ? | (22) |
| 2009–2014 | Alpha United | ? | (?) |
| 2014–2015 | Slingerz | ? | (?) |
| 2015–2017 | Alpha United | ? | (?) |
| 2017– | Fruta Conquerors | ? | (?) |

International career^{‡}
| 2004–2017 | Guyana | 62 | (15) |
- * Club domestic league appearances and goals as of January 5, 2023 ‡ National team caps and goals as of January 5, 2023

Anthony 'Awo' Joseph Abrams (born 3 October 1979) is a Guyanese footballer who plays as a striker for Fruta Conquerors FC in the GFF Elite League. He previously played for Alpha United, Bakewell Topp XX and Slingerz FC; Caledonia AIA and Joe Public in the TT Pro League, and for Leo Victor in the Hoofdklasse where he finished as top scorer of the 2008–09 season with 22 goals. He is considered one of the best players in the history of Guyana, having amassed 62 caps for the national team.

== Career ==
Abrams made his debut in the GFF Super League during the 2001–02 season at age 22 playing for Fruta Conquerors. In 2003, he transferred to Bakewell Topp XX where he played until 2005. In 2006, he signed with TT Pro League side Joe Public F.C. of Trinidad and Tobago, due to lack of opportunities however he returned to Guyana to play for Alpha United FC. In 2007, he returned to Trinidad and Tobago signing with Caledonia AIA only to return to Alpha United later that same year. In 2008, he moved to SV Leo Victor, playing in the Surinamese Hoofdklasse where he finished as the league top scorer with 22 goals. Returning to Alpha United, he made two appearances in 2011 in the club's CONCACAF Champions League campaign while scoring once, playing both matches against CS Herediano from Costa Rica. In 2014, he transferred to Slingerz FC.

== International career ==
Abrams made his debut for the Guyana national team on 15 February 2004 in a friendly match against Barbados. He scored his first goal for the national team against the same opponent on 13 February 2005 in a match which ended in a 3–3 draw. He was an instrumental part of the national teams FIFA World Cup qualifying campaigns in 2006, 2010 and in 2014, as well as having played in the Caribbean Cup.

== Career statistics ==
=== International goals ===
Scores and results list Guyana's goal tally first.

| Goal | Date | Venue | Opponent | Score | Result | Competition |
|---|---|---|---|---|---|---|
| 1. | 24 February 2006 | MSC Ground, Linden, Guyana | Antigua and Barbuda | 1–0 | 2–1 | Friendly match |
| 2. | 26 February 2006 | Providence Stadium, Georgetown, Guyana | Antigua and Barbuda | 3–1 | 4–1 | Friendly match |
| 3. | 6 September 2006 | Ergilio Hato Stadium, Willemstad, Netherlands Antilles | Suriname | 2–0 | 5–0 | 2007 Caribbean Cup qualification |
| 4. | 8 September 2006 | Ergilio Hato Stadium, Willemstad, Netherlands Antilles | Netherlands Antilles | 4–0 | 5–0 | 2007 Caribbean Cup qualification |
| 5. | 27 January 2008 | Arnos Vale Stadium, Kingstown, Saint Vincent and the Grenadines | Saint Vincent and the Grenadines | 1–0 | 2–2 | Friendly match |
| 6. | 22 February 2008 | MSC Ground, Linden, Guyana | Cuba | 1–0 | 2–1 | Friendly match |
| 7. | 15 October 2010 | André Kamperveen Stadion, Paramaribo, Suriname | Netherlands Antilles | 2–2 | 3–2 | 2010 Caribbean Cup qualification |
| 8. | 7 October 2011 | Barbados National Stadium, Bridgetown, Barbados | Barbados | 1–0 | 2–0 | 2014 FIFA World Cup qualification |
| 9. | 22 February 2012 | Grenada National Stadium, St. George's, Grenada | Grenada | 1–0 | 2–1 | Friendly match |
| 10. | 22 March 2012 | Stade de Baduel, Cayenne, French Guiana | French Guiana | 2–0 | 2–0 | Friendly match |
| 11. | 2 May 2012 | Stade d'Honneur de Dillon, Le Lamentin, Martinique | Martinique | 1–2 | 2–2 | Friendly match |
| 12. | 4 June 2016 | Addelita Cancryn Junior High School Ground, Charlotte Amalie, U.S. Virgin Islands | U.S. Virgin Islands | 5–0 | 7–0 | 2017 Caribbean Cup qualification |
| 13. | 4 June 2016 | Addelita Cancryn Junior High School Ground, Charlotte Amalie, U.S. Virgin Islands | U.S. Virgin Islands | 7–0 | 7–0 | 2017 Caribbean Cup qualification |

== Honors ==
=== Club ===
Alpha United FC

- GFF Super League (4): 2010, 2012, 2012–13, 2013–14
- GFF Super 8 Cup (1): 2010
- Georgetown Regional Cup (1): 2006
- NAMLICO Knock-out Tournament (1): 2010
- Kashif & Shanghai Cup: 2009–10 (runner-up)
- CFU Club Championship: 2011 (3rd place)

Caledonia AIA

- Trinidad and Tobago Cup: 2007 (runner-up)

Slingerz FC

- Guyana Mayors Cup (1): 2015

=== Individual ===
- SVB Hoofdklasse Top Goalscorer: 2008–09

== Personal life ==
He is the father of three children, Aaliyah De Freitas, Alicia Abrams and Romario Abrams.
