= Marcus Wilson (footballer) =

Guyanese footballer

Personal information
- Date of birth: 19 April 2002 (age 24)
- Place of birth: St. Cuthbert's Mission, Guyana
- Positions: Defender; midfielder

Team information
- Current team: Santos

Youth career
- Eastveldt FC
- Georgetown

Senior career*
Years	Team	Apps	(Gls)
2021–	Santos		

International career^{‡}
- Guyana U15
	Guyana U17	2+	(0+)
- Guyana U20
2021–	Guyana	1	(0)
- * Club domestic league appearances and goals ‡ National team caps and goals as of 16:34, 23 November 2021 (UTC)

Marcus Wilson (born 19 April 2002) is a Guyanese professional footballer who plays as a defender and midfielder for GFF Elite League club Santos and the Guyana national team.

== Early life ==
Marcus began playing football at the age of four with his father Andrew. He attended St. Pius Primary School before going to Chase Academy, where he completed CXC exams.

== Club career ==
Wilson began his career at Eastveldt FC before joining Georgetown. He would later join Santos.

== International career ==
Wilson has been the captain of Guyana at under-15 and under-17 level. He has also represented his nation at under-20 level. He received his first call-up for the senior national team of Guyana in May 2021. He made his debut in a 2–0 loss to Puerto Rico in FIFA World Cup qualification on 8 June 2021.
