= Vurlon Mills =

Guyanese footballer (born 1988)

Personal information
- Date of birth: 11 February 1988 (age 38)
- Place of birth: Georgetown, Guyana
- Height: 1.68 m (5 ft 6 in)
- Position: Striker

Team information
- Current team: Western Tigers

Senior career*
Years	Team	Apps	(Gls)
2007	United Petrotrin		
2010	Fruta Conquerors		
2011–2012	T&TEC		
2012–2013	Caledonia AIA		
2013	FC Santa Rosa		
2013–2016	Slingerz		
2016–2017	San Juan Jabloteh		
2017–2018	Georgetown		
2018–	Western Tigers		

International career^{‡}
- Guyana U20
2011–	Guyana	26	(7)
- * Club domestic league appearances and goals as of 13:18, 26 March 2019 (UTC) ‡ National team caps and goals as of 13:18, 26 March 2019 (UTC)

Vurlon Mills (born 11 February 1988) is a Guyanese international footballer who plays for Western Tigers, as a striker.

== Career ==
Born in Georgetown, Mills has played club football for United Petrotrin, Fruta Conquerors, T&TEC, Caledonia AIA, FC Santa Rosa, Slingerz, San Juan Jabloteh, Georgetown and Western Tigers.

Mills made his international debut for Guyana in 2011, and has appeared in FIFA World Cup qualifying matches.
