= Enmore Recreation Ground =

Cricket and football ground in Enmore, Guyana

- Interactive map of Enmore Recreation Ground

Ground information
- Location: Enmore, Guyana
- Country: Guyana
- Coordinates: 6.7572°N 57.9892°W
- Establishment: c. 1969
- Capacity: 1,000

Team information
| Guyana | (1992/93–2009/10) |
- As of 21 April 2022; Source: Ground profile

Enmore Recreation Ground is a cricket and football ground in Enmore, Guyana.

== History ==
Located in the Demerara-Mahaica village of Enmore, the ground first played host to top–level domestic cricket in the 1992–93 Geddes Grant Shield when Guyana played Trinidad and Tobago in a List A one-day match. The ground has been used predominantly for one-day matches, hosting seventeen matches between 1993 and 2009, including several matches as a neutral venue between 2004 and 2009. In addition to hosting one-day matches, the ground has also played host to four first-class matches for Guyana between 1998 and 2004 in the Regional Four Day Competition.

As a football venue, the ground is the homeground for fierce rivals Victoria Kings FC and Buxton United FC, who play in the GFF Elite League.

== Records ==
=== First-class ===
- Highest team total: 450 for 8 declared by Guyana v Trinidad and Tobago, 1997–98
- Lowest team total: 106 all out by Trinidad and Tobago v Guyana, 2000–01
- Highest individual innings: 142 by Carl Hooper for Guyana v Trinidad and Tobago, 2000–01
- Best bowling in an innings: 6-25 by Kevin Darlington for Guyana v West Indies B, 2003–04
- Best bowling in a match: 10-114 by Neil McGarrell for Guyana v Trinidad and Tobago, 1997–98

=== List A ===
- Highest team total: 296 for 5 (50 overs) by Guyana v Windward Islands, 1994–95
- Lowest team total: 110 all out (36.4 overs) by West Indies under-19s v Barbados, 2007–08
- Highest individual innings: 104 by Carl Hooper for Guyana v Leeward Islands, 1995–96
- Best bowling in an innings: 3-37 by Roger Harper for Guyana v Trinidad and Tobago, 1992–93

== See also ==
- List of cricket grounds in the West Indies
