= Pernell Schultz =

Guyanese footballer

Personal information
- Date of birth: 7 April 1994 (age 32)
- Place of birth: Georgetown, Guyana
- Height: 1.85 m (6 ft 1 in)
- Position: Midfielder

Team information
- Current team: Fruta Conquerors FC

Senior career*
Years	Team	Apps	(Gls)
2013– 2015	Caledonia AIA		(19)

International career^{‡}
2010	Guyana U17	6	(2)
2012	Guyana U20	2	(0)
2012–	Guyana	9	(2)
- * Club domestic league appearances and goals as of 12:39, 3 October 2015 (UTC) ‡ National team caps and goals as of 12:39, 7 April 2017 (UTC)

Pernell Schultz (born 7 April 1994) is a Guyanese footballer who plays for Fruta Conquerors. He formally played for Trinidadian side Caledonia AIA where he netted 19 league goals during his short stay there.

== International career ==
=== International goals ===
Scores and results list Guyana's goal tally first.

No	Date	Venue	Opponent	Score	Result	Competition
1.	29 March 2015	Providence Stadium, Providence, Guyana	Grenada	1–0	2–0	Friendly
2.	29 March 2015	Providence Stadium, Providence, Guyana	Grenada	2–0	2–0	Friendly
3.	14 October 2019	Synthetic Track and Field Facility, Leonora, Guyana	Antigua and Barbuda	5–1	5–1	2019–20 CONCACAF Nations League B

== Honours ==
Caledonia AIA

Runner-up

- TT Pro League: 2012–13
