= Colin Nelson (footballer, born 1991) =

Guyanese association football player

Personal information
- Date of birth: 9 August 1991 (age 35)
- Place of birth: Georgetown, Guyana
- Height: 1.80 m (5 ft 11 in)
- Position: Center-back

Team information
- Current team: S.U. 1º de Dezembro

Senior career*
Years	Team	Apps	(Gls)
2009–2010	Western Tigers FC		
2010–2013	Morvant Caledonia United		
2013–2017	Alpha United FC		
2015–2016	→ Slingerz FC (loan)		
2017–2018	Western Tigers FC	13	(4)
2018–	S.U. 1º de Dezembro		

International career^{‡}
2009–	Guyana	40	(1)
- * Club domestic league appearances and goals as of 25 January 2019 ‡ National team caps and goals as of 7 June 2025

Colin Nelson (born 9 August 1991) is a Guyanese footballer who plays as a defender for S.U. 1º de Dezembro and the Guyana national football team.

== International career ==
=== International goals ===
Scores and results list Guyana's goal tally first.

No.	Date	Venue	Opponent	Score	Result	Competition
1.	22 May 2011	Providence Stadium, Providence, Guyana	Barbados	2–2	2–3	Friendly
