= Kevin Layne =

Guyanese footballer

Personal information
- Full name: Kevin Layne Jr.
- Date of birth: 1 January 1998 (age 28)
- Place of birth: Georgetown, Guyana
- Height: 1.85 m (6 ft 1 in)
- Positions: Centre-back; defensive midfielder

Team information
- Current team: Guyana Sunnydale Veterans FC

Senior career*
Years	Team	Apps	(Gls)
2016–2017	Monedderlust		
2017–2018	New Amsterdam United		
2019–2021	Guyana Defence Force		
2021–2022	Mount Pleasant 20 ⟨0⟩		

International career^{‡}
	Guyana U17	3	
2018–	Guyana	9	(0)
- * Club domestic league appearances and goals ‡ National team caps and goals as of 10:02, 3 July 2021 (UTC)

Kevin Layne Jr. (1 January 1998) is a Guyanese professional footballer who plays for Cosmopolitan Soccer League club Sunnydale FC and the Guyana national team. Primarily a centre-back, he can also play as a defensive midfielder.
