= Reiss Elliott-Parris =

Guyanese footballer (born 2007)

Personal information
- Full name: Reiss Dennis Elliott-Parris
- Date of birth: 4 November 2007 (age 18)
- Place of birth: Barking, England
- Height: 1.88 m (6 ft 2 in)
- Position: Centre-forward

Team information
- Current team: Tottenham Hotspur
- Number: 72

Youth career
- 2015–: Tottenham Hotspur

Senior career*
Years	Team	Apps	(Gls)
2026–	Tottenham Hotspur	0	(0)

International career^{‡}
2026–	Guyana U20	1	(1)
- * Club domestic league appearances and goals ‡ National team caps and goals as of 01:50, 24 February 2026 (UTC)

Reiss Dennis Elliott-Parris (born 4 November 2007) is a professional footballer who plays as a centre-forward for Premier League club Tottenham Hotspur. Born in England, he represents Guyana at youth level.

== Club career ==
=== Early career ===
Elliott-Parris was born in Barking, London. As a youth player, Elliott-Parris joined the youth academy of Tottenham Hotspur in the English Premier League.

== International career ==
Elliott-Parris was born in England and is of Guyanese descent, was eligible to represent the England national team and the Guyana national team.

Elliott-Parris was included in the Guyana squad for 2026 CONCACAF U-20 Championship qualifying. On 24 February 2026, Elliott-Parris made his Guyana U20 debut during a 3–2 defeat to Curaçao at Stadion Rignaal 'Jean' Francisca and he scored his first goal in that game.

In March 2026, he committed to representing Guyana internationally, and was named in the squad for the 2025–26 CONCACAF Series matches against Dominica and Belize, along with his teammate Walker Shabazz-Edwards.
