= Charles Pollard (footballer) =

Guyanese footballer and coach

Personal information
- Full name: Charles Pollard
- Date of birth: 24 March 1973 (age 53)
- Place of birth: Georgetown, Guyana
- Height: 1.88 m (6 ft 2 in)
- Position: Centre back

Senior career*
Years	Team	Apps	(Gls)
1991–1995	Alpha United FC	33	(2)
1995–1997	Pele FC	50	(5)
1997–2000	Netrockers	56	(5)
2000–2001	Doc's Khelwalaas	22	(2)
2001–2003	W Connection	53	(3)
2003–2005	North East Stars	59	(7)
2005–2006	San Juan Jabloteh	13	(0)
2006–2007	North East Stars	15	(1)
2007–2009	Brooklyn Knights	44	(2)
2009–2010	Caledonia AIA	30	(1)
2010	Joe Public	10	(0)
2010–2013	North East Stars	55	(2)
2013–2014	Slingerz FC		
2014	Malabar FC		
2014–2015	Club Sando		
2015–2016	St. Ann's Rangers		

International career
1996–2012	Guyana	80	(3)
- * Club domestic league appearances and goals

Charles Pollard (born March 24, 1973) is a retired Guyanese footballer and current assistant coach at the Guyana national football team.

He has been capped over 60 times and played several years in Trinidad and Tobago's Pro League.

== Playing career ==
=== Club ===
He started his career in Guyana by playing for Alpha United, Pele and Netrockers. He was voted Guyana player of the year in 1998. Later he moved to Trinidad and Tobago where he proceeded to spend almost all of his career playing professional football for clubs including Docs Kewalas, W Connection, San Juan Jabloteh and two spells with North East Stars, where he became team captain, leading them to championship in 2004.

After a spell in the US playing for United Soccer League side Brooklyn Knights, he returned to Trinidad to play for Caledonia AIA. He joined Joe Public in January 2010 but after just two starts he left the club in April 2010 citing the need to get more regular football in his final season before retirement. Later the same month he rejoined former club North East Stars for the 2010–11 season.

=== International ===
Capped numerous times by the national team (1996-2012), he was the international squad's team captain between 1999 and 2007.

== Managerial career ==
Nicknamed Lily, Pollard was named assistant to national team head coach Michael Johnson in February 2019.
