= Dwight Peters =

Guyanese footballer

Personal information
- Full name: Dwight Peters
- Date of birth: 23 August 1986 (age 40)
- Place of birth: Georgetown, Guyana
- Position: Midfielder

Team information
- Current team: Alpha United

Senior career*
| Years | Team | Apps | (Gls) |
| 2003–2004 | BeterVerwagting Triumph United | | |
| 2005 | Guyana Defence Force | | |
| 2006 | Western Tigers | | |
| 2007 | Caledonia AIA | | |
| 2008 | Guyana Defence Force | | |
| 2009– | Alpha United | | |

International career
| 2008– | Guyana | 32 | (6) |
- * Club domestic league appearances and goals as of 14:15, 23 March 2016 (UTC)

Dwight Peters (born 23 August 1986) is a semi-professional footballer who plays as a midfielder for Alpha United and the Guyana national team.

== Career ==
Peters began his career with BeterVerwagting Triumph in 2003, before joining Guyana Defence Force two years later. A short stay with Western Tigers led to a move to Trinidad & Tobago to join Caledonia ANA in 2007, before returning to Guyana Defence Force for a second spell a year later.

He then moved to Alpha United in 2009, where he was part of the Guyana Super National League winning squad for five consecutive seasons until 2014.

Peters made his international debut for Guyana on 22 June 2008, falling to Suriname in a 2–1 defeat during 2010 FIFA World Cup qualification. His first international goal then came on 10 August 2008 in the Caribbean Cup, scoring a 90th-minute equaliser in a 1–1 draw with Suriname.

He scored his first international brace in his nation's opening fixture of the 2017 Caribbean Cup qualification campaign, during a 7–0 rout of Anguilla.

=== International goals ===
Scores and results list Guyana's goal tally first.

| No | Date | Venue | Opponent | Score | Result | Competition |
|---|---|---|---|---|---|---|
| 1. | 10 August 2008 | Providence Stadium, Providence, Guyana | Suriname | 1–1 | 1–1 | 2008 Caribbean Cup qualification |
| 2. | 26 September 2010 | Providence Stadium, Providence, Guyana | Trinidad and Tobago | 1–0 | 2–3 | Friendly |
| 3. | 15 October 2010 | André Kamperveen Stadion, Paramaribo, Suriname | Netherlands Antilles | 1–0 | 3–2 | 2010 Caribbean Cup qualification |
| 4. | 2 May 2012 | Stade Omnisports, Le Lamentin, Martinique | Martinique | 2–2 | 2–2 | Friendly |
| 5. | 22 March 2016 | Providence Stadium, Providence, Guyana | Anguilla | 1–0 | 7–0 | 2017 Caribbean Cup qualification |
| 6. | 22 March 2016 | Providence Stadium, Providence, Guyana | Anguilla | 3–0 | 7–0 | 2017 Caribbean Cup qualification |
