= GFF National Super League =

- Founded: 1990
- First season: 1990
- Country: Guyana
- Confederation: CONCACAF
- Number of clubs: 10
- Level on pyramid: 1
- Relegation to: Guyana FA Divisions
- Domestic cup(s): GFF Super 8 Cup; Georgetown Regional Cup
- International cup: CONCACAF Caribbean Shield
- Most championships: Alpha United (5)
- Website: GFF National Super League

Guyana Football Federation (GFF) National Super League was the top division in Guyana. It was replaced by the GFF Elite League beginning with the 2015–16 season.

The league used regional qualifying tournaments to determine participants. In its last installment in 2013–14, five teams from Georgetown, three from Upper Demerara, three from East Coast Demerara, two from Berbice, two from West Demerara, and one from East Bank Demerara were represented.

Before the Super League started the top league was the National Football League which was last held in 2001, but there are several Regional Championships held in the country (Bartica SL, Berbice FL, East Bank FUSSFL, East Coast Demerara, Banks DIH Milk Stout League, Georgetown FL, Upper Demerar SL).

== Guyana National Football League 2013/14 ==
- Alpha United (Georgetown)
- Buxton United (East Coast Demerara)
- BV/Triumph United (Relegated) (East Coast Demerara)
- Den Amstel (West Coast Demerara)
- Grove Hi-Tech
- Guyana Defence Force (Georgetown)
- Mahaica Determinators (Relegated)
- Milerock (Linden)
- New Amsterdam United
- Riddim Squad
- Rosignol United (Berbice)
- Santos (Relegated) (Georgetown)
- Silver Shattas
- Western Tigers (Georgetown)
- Winners Connection
- Young Achievers (Relegated)

== Previous winners ==
Champions were:

Season	Champion	Runner-up
1990	Santos	
1991–92	Santos	
1992	Topp XX	Thomas United
1993	No tournament	
1994–95	Western Tigers	Topp XX
1995–96	Milerock	Pele FC
1996	Omai Gold Seekers	
1997	Topp XX	
1998	Santos	Fruta Conquerors
1999–00	No reports	
2000–01	Fruta Conquerors	Real Victoria Kings
2002–08	No tournament	
2009–10	Alpha United	Guyana Defence Force
2010	Alpha United	Milerock
2012	Alpha United	Western Tigers
2012–13	Alpha United	Pele FC
2013–14	Alpha United	Guyana Defence Force
2014–15	No tournament	

== Performance by club ==
Club	City	Titles	Years
Alpha United	Georgetown	5	2009–10, 2010, 2012, 2012–13, 2013–14
Santos	Georgetown	3	1990, 1991–92, 1998
Topp XX	Linden	2	1992, 1997
Western Tigers	Georgetown	1	1994–95
Milerock	Linden	1	1995–96
Omai Gold Seekers	Bartica	1	1996
Fruta Conquerors	Georgetown	1	2000–01

== Best scorers ==
Year	Best scorers	Team	Goals
2000-01	Matthew Pollard	Netrockers	16
