= 2026 CONCACAF U-20 Championship qualifying =

Tournament details
- Host countries: Costa Rica; Curaçao; Nicaragua
- Dates: 23 February – 4 March 2026
- Teams: 32 (from 1 confederation)
- Venue: 3 (in 3 host cities)

Tournament statistics
- Matches played: 67
- Goals scored: 271 (4.04 per match)
- Top scorer(s): (Suriname) Xavi Dors (8 goals)

The 2026 CONCACAF U-20 Championship qualifying tournament selected the six nations joining Cuba, Guatemala, Honduras, Mexico, Panama, and the United States at the 2026 CONCACAF U-20 Championship in July and August. The qualifying tournament also served as the first stage in qualifying for the 2027 Pan American Games, 2027 FIFA U-20 World Cup, and 2028 Olympics.

== Entrants ==
Cuba, Guatemala, Honduras, Mexico, Panama, and the United States received byes to the 2026 CONCACAF U-20 Championship as the six highest-ranked teams based on the CONCACAF Under-20 Ranking released on 5 August 2024. Thirty-two teams entered qualifying and were seeded into six draw pots based on the same rankings. On 6 November 2025, the teams entering qualifying were drawn into two groups of six teams and four groups of five teams to play single round-robin matches. The top-ranked team of each group qualified for the final tournament.

Bye to final tournament
1. **United States**
2. **Mexico**
3. **Honduras**
4. **Panama**
5. **Cuba**
6. **Guatemala**

Qualifying tournament draw pots (Note: Teams in bold qualified for the 2026 CONCACAF U-20 Championship)
Pot 1	Pot 2	Pot 3
7. **Costa Rica**; 8. **El Salvador**; 9. **Canada**; 10. Dominican Republic; 11. **Haiti**; 12. **Jamaica**	13. Trinidad and Tobago; 14. Nicaragua; 15. Curaçao (Note: Not a member of the IOC, therefore ineligible for the 2028 Summer Olympics); 16. **Antigua and Barbuda**; 17. Suriname; 18. Puerto Rico	19. Bermuda; 20. Aruba; 21. Saint Kitts and Nevis; 22. Belize; 23. Saint Lucia; 24. Guyana
Pot 4	Pot 5	Pot 6
25. Grenada; 26. Saint Vincent and the Grenadines; 27. British Virgin Islands; 28. Cayman Islands; 29. Barbados; 30. Martinique (Note: Not a member of FIFA, therefore ineligible for the 2027 FIFA U-20 World Cup)	31. Dominica; 32. Saint Martin; 33. Sint Maarten; 34. Anguilla; 35. U.S. Virgin Islands; 36. Turks and Caicos Islands	37. French Guiana; 38. Bonaire

== Schedule ==
Qualifying matches were played from 23 February to 4 March.

Matchday	Groups	
Matchday	A, B, C	D, E, F
1	23 February	24 February
2	25 February	26 February
3	27 February	28 February
4	1 March	2 March
5	3 March	4 March

== Tiebreakers ==
Teams were ranked according to the following criteria:

1. Greater number of points obtained in all matches
2. Greater overall goal difference
3. Greater overall number of goals scored

If two or more teams are tied, the following criteria were applied:

4. Greater number of points scored in matches between the tied teams
5. Greater goal difference in matches between the tied teams (if more than two teams are tied)
6. Greater number of goals scored in matches between the tied teams (if more than two teams are tied)
7. Lower number of disciplinary points:
  - First yellow card: 1 point
  - Second yellow card/indirect red card: 3 points
  - Direct red card: 4 points
  - Yellow card and direct red card: 5 points
8. Higher ranking in the CONCACAF Under-20 ranking published most recently before qualification started

== Results ==
=== Group A ===
All matches were played at Estadio Miguel Chocorrón Buitrago in Managua. All match times are UTC–6.

Pos	Team	Pld	W	D	L	GF	GA	GD	Pts	Qualification
1	El Salvador	5	4	0	1	16	3	+13	12	Final tournament
2	Suriname	5	4	0	1	16	4	+12	12	
3	Belize	5	3	0	2	10	17	−7	9	
4	Saint Martin	5	1	1	3	6	10	−4	4	
5	French Guiana	5	1	1	3	5	10	−5	4	
6	Grenada	5	1	0	4	3	12	−9	3	

Source: CONCACAF
Rules for classification: Tiebreakers
23 February 2026
14:00

Grenada	2–1	Saint Martin
E. George 36'; Sylvester 42'	Report	Nkpa 25'

Estadio Miguel Chocorrón Buitrago, Managua
Referee: Alyssa Pennington (United States)
23 February 2026
17:00

Suriname	7–2	Belize
Dors 17' (pen.), 24', 31', 37'; Pixabaj 26' (o.g.), 77' (o.g.); Ligeon 80'	Report	Garbutt 4'; Linares 33'

Estadio Miguel Chocorrón Buitrago, Managua
Referee: Norberto Da Silva (Curaçao)
23 February 2026
20:00

El Salvador	3–0	French Guiana
Ortiz 11'; Tobar 41', 64'	Report

Estadio Miguel Chocorrón Buitrago, Managua
Referee: Kwinsi Williams (Trinidad and Tobago)

25 February 2026
14:00

Belize	3–0	Grenada
Carranza 37'; Meza 81'; Linares 84'	Report

Estadio Miguel Chocorrón Buitrago, Managua
Referee: Hakeem Harvey (Saint Kitts and Nevis)
25 February 2026
17:00

Suriname	2–0	French Guiana
Dors 19', 76'	Report

Estadio Miguel Chocorrón Buitrago, Managua
Referee: Jefferson Escobar (Honduras)
25 February 2026
20:00

Saint Martin	1–4	El Salvador
Joe 15'	Report	Coreas 12' (pen.); Peña 75'; W. Díaz 82'; Robles 86'

Estadio Miguel Chocorrón Buitrago, Managua
Referee: Christopher Mason (Jamaica)

27 February 2026
14:00

Belize	3–2	French Guiana
Williams 60' (pen.); Olivas 82'; Thurton 90+3'	Report	Boyce 18'; Fernand 38'

Estadio Miguel Chocorrón Buitrago, Managua
Referee: Jorge Leira (Panama)
27 February 2026
17:00

Suriname	1–2	Saint Martin
Dors 76'	Report	Gonzague 40', 74'

Estadio Miguel Chocorrón Buitrago, Managua
Referee: Alyssa Pennington (United States)
27 February 2026
20:00

Grenada	0–2	El Salvador
	Report	Aguilar 41'; W. Díaz 81'

Estadio Miguel Chocorrón Buitrago, Managua
Referee: Randy Encarnación (Dominican Republic)

1 March 2026
14:00

Saint Martin	1–1	French Guiana
N'Guessan 76' (pen.)	Report	Prosper 86'

Estadio Miguel Chocorrón Buitrago, Managua
Referee: Jefferson Escobar (Honduras)
1 March 2026
17:00

Suriname	4–0	Grenada
Josias 17'; Nirk 38'; Doekoe 48'; Ligeon 68'	Report

Estadio Miguel Chocorrón Buitrago, Managua
Referee: Kwinsi Williams (Trinidad and Tobago)
1 March 2026
20:00

El Salvador	7–0	Belize
Coreas 9'; Saravia 39' (o.g.); Ortiz 41', 60'; Cabrera 78'; Aguirre 88'; Arnold 90+2'	Report

Estadio Miguel Chocorrón Buitrago, Managua
Referee: Oliver Vergara (Panama)

3 March 2026
14:00

Grenada	1–2	French Guiana
Frederick 87'	Report	Ullindah 9'; Prudent 13'

Estadio Miguel Chocorrón Buitrago, Managua
Referee: Marianela Araya (Costa Rica)
3 March 2026
17:00

Belize	2–1	Saint Martin
Williams 31'; Meza 74'	Report	Hon 54'

Estadio Miguel Chocorrón Buitrago, Managua
Referee: Kimbell Ward (Saint Kitts and Nevis)
3 March 2026
20:00

El Salvador	0–2	Suriname
	Report	Dors 34'; Grootfaam 45+1'

Estadio Miguel Chocorrón Buitrago, Managua
Referee: Jorge Leira (Panama)

=== Group B ===
All matches were played at Stadion Rignaal 'Jean' Francisca in Willemstad. All match times are UTC–4.

Pos	Team	Pld	W	D	L	GF	GA	GD	Pts	Qualification
1	Jamaica	5	5	0	0	28	0	+28	15	Final tournament
2	Puerto Rico	5	4	0	1	13	2	+11	12	
3	Bonaire	5	2	1	2	6	12	−6	7	
4	Turks and Caicos Islands	5	2	0	3	4	14	−10	6	
5	Saint Kitts and Nevis	5	1	1	3	5	12	−7	4	
6	Cayman Islands	5	0	0	5	3	19	−16	0	

Source: CONCACAF
Rules for classification: Tiebreakers
23 February 2026
14:00

Cayman Islands	1–2	Turks and Caicos Islands
Jones 10'	Report	Robertson 17'; Gardiner 83'

Stadion Rignaal 'Jean' Francisca, Willemstad
Referee: Waldir García (El Salvador)
23 February 2026
17:00

Puerto Rico	2–1	Saint Kitts and Nevis
Vicentti 15', 41'	Report	Riviere 87'

Stadion Rignaal 'Jean' Francisca, Willemstad
Referee: Brayan Cruz (Costa Rica)
23 February 2026
20:00

Jamaica	3–0	Bonaire
Leighton 24'; Talbert 43'; Campbel-Dennis 71'	Report

Stadion Rignaal 'Jean' Francisca, Willemstad
Referee: Andrew Samuel (Trinidad and Tobago)

25 February 2026
14:00

Saint Kitts and Nevis	3–0	Cayman Islands
Morton 43' (pen.); Matthew 45+5'; Hamilton 56'	Report

Stadion Rignaal 'Jean' Francisca, Willemstad
Referee: Ismael López (Mexico)
25 February 2026
17:00

Puerto Rico	5–0	Bonaire
Muller 5' (o.g.); Basabe 13'; Diaz 76'; Márquez 87'; Vicentti 90+1'	Report

Stadion Rignaal 'Jean' Francisca, Willemstad
Referee: Shavin Greene (Guyana)
25 February 2026
20:00

Turks and Caicos Islands	0–7	Jamaica
	Report	Campbell-Dennis 10', 13'; Nolan 18'; Howell 30'; Taylor 61', 87'; Miller 82'

Stadion Rignaal 'Jean' Francisca, Willemstad
Referee: Patrick Senecharles (Haiti)

27 February 2026
14:00

Saint Kitts and Nevis	1–1	Bonaire
Morton 39'	Report	Bakelaar 51'

Stadion Rignaal 'Jean' Francisca, Willemstad
Referee: Nelson Salgado (Honduras)
27 February 2026
17:00

Puerto Rico	4–0	Turks and Caicos Islands
Vicentti 14' (pen.), 59'; Diaz 31'; Márquez 80'	Report

Stadion Rignaal 'Jean' Francisca, Willemstad
Referee: Andrew Samuel (Saint Kitts and Nevis)
27 February 2026
20:00

Cayman Islands	0–9	Jamaica
	Report	Wilberforce 19'; Taylor 28', 33'; Miller 52'; Nugent 71'; Nolan 79', 90', 90+3'; Howell 88'

Stadion Rignaal 'Jean' Francisca, Willemstad
Referee: Josué Ugalde (Costa Rica)

1 March 2026
14:00

Turks and Caicos Islands	1–2	Bonaire
Selver 9'	Report	Bakelaar 36' (pen.); Muller 79'

Stadion Rignaal 'Jean' Francisca, Willemstad
Referee: Patrick Senecharles (Haiti)
1 March 2026
17:00

Puerto Rico	2–0	Cayman Islands
Delgado 31'; Burgos 35'	Report

Stadion Rignaal 'Jean' Francisca, Willemstad
Referee: Jesús López Valle (Mexico)
1 March 2026
20:00

Jamaica	8–0	Saint Kitts and Nevis
Leighton 10', 60'; Howell 12'; Nolan 32' (pen.); Campbell-Dennis 53' (pen.); Dennis 67', 90+2'; Miller 71'	Report

Stadion Rignaal 'Jean' Francisca, Willemstad
Referee: Shavin Greene (Guyana)

3 March 2026
14:00

Cayman Islands	2–3	Bonaire
Johnson 7', 31'	Report	Merenciana 28'; Clijesdale 40'; Muller 81'

Stadion Rignaal 'Jean' Francisca, Willemstad
Referee: Nelson Salgado (Honduras)
3 March 2026
17:00

Saint Kitts and Nevis	0–1	Turks and Caicos Islands
	Report	Gardiner 30'

Stadion Rignaal 'Jean' Francisca, Willemstad
Referee: Ken Pennyfeather (Antigua and Barbuda)
3 March 2026
20:00

Jamaica	1–0	Puerto Rico
Howell 32'	Report

Stadion Rignaal 'Jean' Francisca, Willemstad
Referee: Ismael López Peñuelas (Mexico)

=== Group C ===
All matches were played at Costa Rican Football Federation field #1 in San Rafael District, Alajuela. All match times are UTC–6.

Pos	Team	Pld	W	D	L	GF	GA	GD	Pts	Qualification
1	Antigua and Barbuda	4	4	0	0	5	0	+5	12	Final tournament
2	Dominican Republic	4	3	0	1	11	1	+10	9	
3	British Virgin Islands	4	1	1	2	4	8	−4	4	
4	Saint Lucia	4	1	0	3	4	8	−4	3	
5	Dominica	4	0	1	3	2	9	−7	1	

Source: CONCACAF
Rules for classification: Tiebreakers
23 February 2026
11:00

British Virgin Islands	2–2	Dominica
Quashie 10'; Broderick 45+1'	Report	Cline 1' (o.g.); Harve 31'

FCRF Federation Field #1, Alajuela
Referee: Carly Shaw-Maclaren (Canada)
23 February 2026
14:00

Antigua and Barbuda	1–0	Saint Lucia
Satchell 35'	Report

FCRF Federation Field #1, Alajuela
Referee: Karen Hernández (Mexico)

25 February 2026
11:00

Antigua and Barbuda	2–0	British Virgin Islands
G. Williams 16'; Whiteside 51' (o.g.)	Report

FCRF Federation Field #1, Alajuela
Referee: Félix Mojica (Nicaragua)
25 February 2026
14:00

Dominica	0–3	Dominican Republic
	Report	Bobea 14'; Ortiz 75', 90+2'

FCRF Federation Field #1, Alajuela
Referee: Jaime Herrera (El Salvador)

27 February 2026
11:00

Saint Lucia	3–0	Dominica
Butcher 10', 52' (pen.); Popo 70'	Report

FCRF Federation Field #1, Alajuela
Referee: Moet Gaymes (Saint Vincent and the Grenadines)
27 February 2026
14:00

Dominican Republic	3–0	British Virgin Islands
López 1'; Ramos 17'; Mercado 73'	Report

FCRF Federation Field #1, Alajuela
Referee: Diego Ojer (Guatemala)

1 March 2026
11:00

Dominica	0–1	Antigua and Barbuda
	Report	Adams 49'

FCRF Federation Field #1, Alajuela
Referee: Steffon Dewar (Jamaica)
1 March 2026
14:00

Saint Lucia	0–5	Dominican Republic
	Report	López 21'; Bobea 30'; Ortiz 36' (pen.); Ramos 57'; Marte 83'

FCRF Federation Field #1, Alajuela
Referee: Sergio Reyna (Guatemala)

3 March 2026
11:00

British Virgin Islands	2–1	Saint Lucia
Quashie 55', 84'	Report	Mondesir 47'

FCRF Federation Field #1, Alajuela
Referee: Okeito Nicholson (Jamaica)
3 March 2026
14:00

Dominican Republic	0–1	Antigua and Barbuda
	Report	Satchell 89'

FCRF Federation Field #1, Alajuela
Referee: Jorge Ojeda (Nicaragua)

=== Group D ===
All matches were played at Stadion Rignaal 'Jean' Francisca in Willemstad. All match times are UTC–4.

Pos	Team	Pld	W	D	L	GF	GA	GD	Pts	Qualification
1	Haiti	4	4	0	0	16	1	+15	12	Final tournament
2	Curaçao (H)	4	3	0	1	13	4	+9	9	
3	Saint Vincent and the Grenadines	4	2	0	2	9	10	−1	6	
4	Guyana (Note: On 2 March 2026, the CONCACAF Disciplinary Committee sanctioned Anguilla and Guyana due to severe disciplinary incidents during their match on 28 February. The match was awarded to Guyana after Anguilla received five red cards, leaving the team below the minimum number of players required, and the 5–0 final score stood. Both teams were fined and disqualified from the competition, with their remaining fixtures recorded as 3–0 forfeits in favor of their respective opponents. In addition, nine players—five from Anguilla and four from Guyana—received four-match suspensions to be served in official CONCACAF or FIFA competitions.)	4	1	0	3	7	9	−2	3	Disqualified
5	Anguilla	4	0	0	4	0	21	−21	0	Disqualified

Source: CONCACAF
Rules for classification: Tiebreakers
(H) Hosts
Notes:
24 February 2026
17:00

Saint Vincent and the Grenadines	6–0	Anguilla
Connor 4' (o.g.); Hooper 19'; Clarke 45', 47'; Cunningham 67'; Lewis 84'	Report

Stadion Rignaal 'Jean' Francisca, Willemstad
Referee: José Valladares (Honduras)
24 February 2026
20:00

Curaçao	3–2	Guyana
Bernardina 20' (pen.), 68'; Busby 34'	Report	Wharton 8'; Parris 90'

Stadion Rignaal 'Jean' Francisca, Willemstad
Referee: Rafael López (Mexico)

26 February 2026
17:00

Anguilla	0–7	Haiti
	Report	Celestin 9', 76' (pen.); Leconte 15'; Pierre 57', 70'; Romulus 85'; Exantus 90+3'

Stadion Rignaal 'Jean' Francisca, Willemstad
Referee: Ken Pennyfeather (Antigua and Barbuda)
26 February 2026
20:00

Curaçao	6–0	Saint Vincent and the Grenadines
Bernardina 36' (pen.), 63', 90+5'; Busby 42'; Cornecion 45+3', 57'	Report

Stadion Rignaal 'Jean' Francisca, Willemstad
Referee: Filiberto Martínez (El Salvador)

28 February 2026
17:00

Guyana	5–0	Anguilla
Kendall 4', 57'; Wharton 18', 23'; Clark 41'	Report

Stadion Rignaal 'Jean' Francisca, Willemstad
Referee: Waldir García (El Salvador)
28 February 2026
20:00

Haiti	4–0	Saint Vincent and the Grenadines
Pierre 45+2', 51'; Exantus 57'; Anglade 90+1'	Report

Stadion Rignaal 'Jean' Francisca, Willemstad
Referee: Brayan Cruz (Costa Rica)

2 March 2026
17:00

Anguilla	0–3 Awarded (Note: On 2 March 2026, the CONCACAF Disciplinary Committee sanctioned Anguilla and Guyana due to severe disciplinary incidents during their match on 28 February. The match was awarded to Guyana after Anguilla received five red cards, leaving the team below the minimum number of players required, and the 5–0 final score stood. Both teams were fined and disqualified from the competition, with their remaining fixtures recorded as 3–0 forfeits in favor of their respective opponents. In addition, nine players—five from Anguilla and four from Guyana—received four-match suspensions to be served in official CONCACAF or FIFA competitions.)	Curaçao
	Report

Stadion Rignaal 'Jean' Francisca, Willemstad
2 March 2026
20:00

Guyana	0–3 Awarded	Haiti
	Report

Stadion Rignaal 'Jean' Francisca, Willemstad

4 March 2026
17:00

Saint Vincent and the Grenadines	3–0 Awarded	Guyana

Stadion Rignaal 'Jean' Francisca, Willemstad
4 March 2026
20:00

Haiti	2–1	Curaçao
Joseph 90'; Romulus 90+3'		Bernardina 62' (pen.)

Stadion Rignaal 'Jean' Francisca, Willemstad
Referee: Josué Ugalde (Costa Rica)

=== Group E ===
All matches were played at Costa Rican Football Federation field #2 in San Rafael District, Alajuela. All match times are UTC–6.

Pos	Team	Pld	W	D	L	GF	GA	GD	Pts	Qualification
1	Costa Rica (H)	4	3	1	0	21	3	+18	10	Final tournament
2	Bermuda	4	2	2	0	9	5	+4	8	
3	Trinidad and Tobago	4	2	1	1	11	6	+5	7	
4	Barbados	4	0	1	3	2	11	−9	1	
5	Sint Maarten	4	0	1	3	1	19	−18	1	

Source: CONCACAF
Rules for classification: Tiebreakers
(H) Hosts
24 February 2026
11:00

Barbados	1–1	Sint Maarten
Bayne 26'	Report	T. van Ottele 20'

FCRF Federation Field #2, Alajuela
Referee: Sergio Reyna (Guatemala)
24 February 2026
14:00

Trinidad and Tobago	2–2	Bermuda
Peets 78' (o.g.); D. Joseph 79'	Report	Donawa 38'; Morrison 84'

FCRF Federation Field #2, Alajuela
Referee: Steffon Dewar (Jamaica)

26 February 2026
11:00

Trinidad and Tobago	5–1	Barbados
Ochoa 5'; Caprietta 9'; D. Joseph 45+3'; Kallicharan 70'; Garcia 90'	Report	Moore 90+3'

FCRF Federation Field #2, Alajuela
Referee: Okeito Nicholson (Jamaica)
26 February 2026
14:00

Sint Maarten	0–12	Costa Rica
	Report	Garro 6'; Sibaja 14', 57', 58'; Y. Leal 21'; K. Hernández 25', 42'; Badilla 67', 84'; Palmer 69', 90+1'; Rodríguez 87'

FCRF Federation Field #2, Alajuela
Referee: Jorge Ojeda (Nicaragua)

28 February 2026
11:00

Bermuda	2–0	Sint Maarten
DeRoza 68'; Fray 90+1'	Report

FCRF Federation Field #2, Alajuela
Referee: Karen Hernández (Mexico)
28 February 2026
14:00

Costa Rica	3–0	Barbados
Garro 4'; Sosa 27'; Palmer 44'	Report

FCRF Federation Field #2, Alajuela
Referee: Carly Shaw-MacLaren (Canada)

2 March 2026
11:00

Sint Maarten	0–4	Trinidad and Tobago
	Report	Williams 23'; Joseph 28'; Kallicharan 69'; Hospedales 87'

FCRF Federation Field #2, Alajuela
Referee: Jaime Herrera (El Salvador)
2 March 2026
14:00

Bermuda	3–3	Costa Rica
DeRoza 47', 60'; Donawa 76'	Report	Leal 14'; Pérez 71'; Morera 82'

FCRF Federation Field #2, Alajuela
Referee: Félix Mojica (Nicaragua)

4 March 2026
11:00

Barbados	0–2	Bermuda
		Brunson 11'; Belboda 19'

FCRF Federation Field #2, Alajuela
Referee: Moet Gaymes (Saint Vincent and the Grenadines)
4 March 2026
14:00

Costa Rica	3–0	Trinidad and Tobago
Palmer 21'; Garro 73'; Sosa 81' (pen.)

FCRF Federation Field #2, Alajuela
Referee: Diego Ojer (Guatemala)

=== Group F ===
All matches were played at Estadio Miguel Chocorrón Buitrago in Managua. All match times are UTC–6.

Pos	Team	Pld	W	D	L	GF	GA	GD	Pts	Qualification
1	Canada	4	3	0	1	24	1	+23	9	Final tournament
2	Nicaragua (H)	4	3	0	1	12	5	+7	9	
3	Aruba	4	2	1	1	4	2	+2	7	
4	Martinique	4	1	1	2	7	14	−7	4	
5	U.S. Virgin Islands	4	0	0	4	4	29	−25	0	

Source: CONCACAF
Rules for classification: Tiebreakers
(H) Hosts
24 February 2026
16:00

Martinique	7–1	U.S. Virgin Islands
Hatchi-Filomin 3', 27'; Theramene 45'; Delem 62', 68'; Boulange 71'; Gonzalve 72'	Report	Bass 76'

Estadio Miguel Chocorrón Buitrago, Managua
Referee: Oliver Vergara (Panama)
24 February 2026
19:00

Nicaragua	0–2	Aruba
	Report	Losiabaar 53'; Wilkerson 59'

Estadio Miguel Chocorrón Buitrago, Managua
Referee: Raúl Castro (Honduras)

26 February 2026
16:00

U.S. Virgin Islands	0–14	Canada
	Report	Graham-Roache 4', 31', 53'; Bruno 6', 45+4'; Bibishkov 11', 42', 80', 88'; Sadek 25'; Jimoh 33'; Mackenzie 45+1'; Evans 69', 75'

Estadio Miguel Chocorrón Buitrago, Managua
Referee: Kimbell Ward (Saint Kitts and Nevis)
26 February 2026
19:00

Nicaragua	5–0	Martinique
Caracas 4'; Uriarte 22', 63'; Montenegro 67', 78'	Report

Estadio Miguel Chocorrón Buitrago, Managua
Referee: Marianela Araya (Costa Rica)

28 February 2026
16:00

Aruba	2–0	U.S. Virgin Islands
Losiabaar 59'; Martis 75'	Report

Estadio Miguel Chocorrón Buitrago, Managua
Referee: Raúl Castro (Honduras)
28 February 2026
19:00

Canada	8–0	Martinique
MacKenzie 5'; Evans 9', 12', 35'; Graham-Roache 38'; Bibishkov 65', 81'; Bossenberry 90'	Report

Estadio Miguel Chocorrón Buitrago, Managua
Referee: Norberto Da Silva (Curaçao)

2 March 2026
16:00

U.S. Virgin Islands	3–6	Nicaragua
Armour 32'; Bass 35', 42' (pen.)		Uriarte 2', 21', 74'; Montenegro 38', 50'; Zepeda 90+2'

Estadio Miguel Chocorrón Buitrago, Managua
Referee: Hakeem Harvey (Saint Kitts and Nevis)
2 March 2026
19:00

Aruba	0–2	Canada
		Graham-Roache 89'; Judelson 90+6' (pen.)

Estadio Miguel Chocorrón Buitrago, Managua
Referee: Christopher Mason (Jamaica)

4 March 2026
16:00

Martinique	0–0	Aruba

Estadio Miguel Chocorrón Buitrago, Managua
Referee: Randy Encarnación (Dominican Republic)
4 March 2026
19:00

Canada	0–1	Nicaragua
		Avilés 37'

Estadio Miguel Chocorrón Buitrago, Managua
Referee: Alyssa Pennington (United States)

=== Top scorers ===
As of 4 March 2026

Rank	Player	Goals
1	(Suriname) Xavi Dors	8
2	(Costa Rica) Dax Palmer	5
2	(Canada) Owen Graham-Roache	5
2	(Jamaica) Jahmarie Nolan	5
