= Police F.C. (Guyana) =

Guyanese football club

Police FC
- Full name: Police Football Club
- League: GFF Elite League
- 2025: GFF Elite League, 2nd of 10

Police Football Club, also referred to as Guyana Police Force F.C., is a Guyanese football club in Georgetown. The club competes in the GFF Elite League, the top league of football in Guyana. They are the representative team of the Guyana Police Force.

== History ==
Police FC was founded alongside a number of other sports clubs for members of the public services in the British Guiana colony. The Police club became a strong force in a number of sports but mostly in football. Though their cricket team did produce players for the West Indies cricket team. They also play 8-player football where they have won Guyana national titles. In 2016, Police FC won the Guyana Mayors Cup after beating Western Tigers. Police FC were promoted into the Elite League in 2019 after winning a playoff against Soesdyke Falcons.

In 2023, Police FC was involved in a controversy with the Guyana Football Federation (GFF). The GFF announced that Police was not considered a club in "good standing" on the grounds of the Police force interfering with the football side and thus they were barred from taking part or voting in the GFF Congress. Police FC wrote a letter citing that it had always been traditional for the Commissioner of Police to select the club president, who then appoints the staff, which the GFF had not previously objected to. They also cited that they had not been given formal notification of the withdrawal of voting rights and only found out via media reports. Three days later, the GFF Electoral Committee rescinded the restrictions on voting at the congress.
