= Walker Shabazz-Edwards =

Barbadian footballer (born 2006)

Personal information
- Full name: Walker Zidane Waqar Brian Shabazz-Edwards
- Date of birth: 4 May 2007 (age 19)
- Place of birth: England
- Height: 2.00 m (6 ft 7 in)
- Position: Centre-back

Team information
- Current team: Ipswich Town

Youth career
- Ilford

Senior career*
| Years | Team | Apps | (Gls) |
| 2023–2024 | Ilford | 14 | (0) |
| 2024–2025 | Brightlingsea Regent | 40 | (2) |
| 2025– | Ipswich Town | 0 | (0) |

International career^{‡}
| 2026– | Guyana U20 | 2 | (0) |
| 2026– | Guyana | 2 | (0) |
- * Club domestic league appearances and goals as of 15:13, 28 January 2026 (UTC) ‡ National team caps and goals as of 15:13, 28 January 2026 (UTC)

Walker Zidane Waqar Brian Shabazz-Edwards (born 4 May 2007) is a professional footballer who plays as a centre-back for EFL Championship club Ipswich Town. Born in England, he plays for the Guyana national team.

== Club career ==
Shabazz-Edwards began his senior career in the Essex Senior Football League side Ilford in 2023, before moving to Isthmian League club Brightlingsea Regent the following season. On 4 March 2025, he signed his first professional contract with Ipswich Town.

== International career ==
Born in England, Shabazz-Edwards is of Guyanese descent. He was called up to the Guyana U20s for 2026 CONCACAF U-20 Championship qualifying matches in February 2026. He was called up to the senior Guyana national team for a set of 2025–26 CONCACAF Series matches. He debuted with Guyana in a friendly 3–1 win over Belize on 30 March 2026.
