= Daniel Wilson (footballer, born 1993) =

Guyanese footballer

Personal information
- Full name: Daniel Jeran Wilson
- Date of birth: 1 November 1993 (age 33)
- Place of birth: Georgetown, Guyana
- Position: Midfielder

Team information
- Current team: Alpha United

Senior career*
Years	Team	Apps	(Gls)
2013–2014	TP-47	26	(3)
2014–	Alpha United		

International career^{‡}
2011–	Guyana	66	(1)
- * Club domestic league appearances and goals ‡ National team caps and goals as of 6 June 2025

Daniel Wilson (born November 1, 1993) is a Guyana association footballer who currently plays for Alpha United FC in the GFF National Super League, and the Guyana national football team.

== Career ==
Wilson first signed for TP-47 in the Finnish third division with the aim of playing at a higher level within Europe. Despite a solid first season in the club, where he played regularly he returned to his homeland with Alpha United FC.

== International career ==
Wilson made his debut for Guyana in a friendly match against India where he came on as a late substitute in Guyana's surprise 2–1 victory.

=== International goals ===
Scores and results list Guyana's goal tally first.

No	Date	Venue	Opponent	Score	Result	Competition
1.	16 November 2012	Grenada National Stadium, St. George's, Grenada	Grenada	1–1	1–2	2012 Caribbean Cup qualification
