= Ann's Grove FC =

Guyanese football club

- Full name: Ann's Grove Football Club
- Nickname: Grove
- League: GFF Elite League
- 2019: GFF Elite League, 10th of 10

Ann's Grove FC is a Guyanese football club in Georgetown. The club competes in the GFF Elite League, the top league of football in Guyana.
