= 1984 CONCACAF U-20 Tournament =

Tournament details
- Host country: Trinidad and Tobago
- Dates: 19 August – 7 September
- Teams: 16

Final positions
- Champions: Mexico (8th title)
- Runners-up: Canada
- Third place: El Salvador
- Fourth place: United States

The 1984 CONCACAF Under-20 Championship was held in Trinidad and Tobago. It also served as qualification for the 1985 FIFA World Youth Championship.

== Teams ==
Jamaica and Suriname withdrew before the tournament and the Dominican Republic confirmed their participation too late. The following teams entered the tournament:

Region	Team(s)
Caribbean (CFU)	Barbados; Bermuda; Cuba; Guyana; Haiti; Netherlands Antilles; Puerto Rico; Trinidad and Tobago (host)
Central America (UNCAF)	Costa Rica; El Salvador; Guatemala; Honduras; Panama
North America (NAFU)	Canada; Mexico; United States

== Round 1 ==
=== Group 1 ===
Teams	Pld	W	D	L	GF	GA	GD	Pts
El Salvador	3	2	1	0	3	0	+3	5
Canada	3	1	2	0	6	1	+5	4
Cuba	3	0	2	1	2	4	−2	2
Guatemala	3	0	1	2	1	7	−6	1

Canada	5–0	Guatemala
El Salvador	2–0	Cuba
Guatemala	1–1	Cuba
Canada	0–0	El Salvador
Canada	1–1	Cuba
El Salvador	1–0	Guatemala

=== Group 2 ===
Teams	Pld	W	D	L	GF	GA	GD	Pts
Honduras	3	3	0	0	6	3	+3	6
United States	3	2	0	1	7	2	+5	4
Bermuda	3	1	0	2	7	7	0	2
Barbados	3	0	0	3	3	11	−8	0

Honduras	2–1	Bermuda
United States	3–0	Barbados
Bermuda	6–2	Barbados
Honduras	2–1	United States
United States	3–0	Bermuda
Honduras	2–1	Barbados

=== Group 3 ===
Teams	Pld	W	D	L	GF	GA	GD	Pts
Trinidad and Tobago	3	2	0	1	6	2	+4	4
Guyana	3	2	0	1	5	4	+1	4
Panama	3	2	0	1	4	5	−1	4
Netherlands Antilles	3	0	0	3	2	6	−4	0

Panama	2–1	Netherlands Antilles
Trinidad and Tobago	1–2	Guyana
Guyana	2–1	Netherlands Antilles
Trinidad and Tobago	3–0	Panama
Panama	2–1	Guyana
Trinidad and Tobago	2–0	Netherlands Antilles

=== Group 4 ===
Teams	Pld	W	D	L	GF	GA	GD	Pts
Mexico	3	3	0	0	7	1	+6	6
Costa Rica	3	2	0	1	13	5	+8	4
Haiti	3	1	0	2	7	5	+2	2
Puerto Rico	3	0	0	3	0	16	−16	0

Haiti	5–0	Puerto Rico
Mexico	3–1	Costa Rica
Costa Rica	8–0	Puerto Rico
Mexico	1–0	Haiti
Mexico	3–0	Puerto Rico
Costa Rica	4–2	Haiti

== Round 2 ==
=== Group A ===
Teams	Pld	W	D	L	GF	GA	GD	Pts
El Salvador	3	1	2	0	4	2	+2	4
United States	3	1	2	0	2	1	+1	4
Trinidad and Tobago	3	0	2	1	1	2	−1	2
Costa Rica	3	0	2	1	0	2	−2	2

El Salvador	1–1	United States
Trinidad and Tobago	0–0	Costa Rica
United States	0–0	Costa Rica
Trinidad and Tobago	1–1	El Salvador
El Salvador	2–0	Costa Rica
Trinidad and Tobago	0–1	United States

=== Group B ===
Teams	Pld	W	D	L	GF	GA	GD	Pts
Mexico	3	2	1	0	6	1	+5	5
Canada	3	2	1	0	5	1	+4	5
Honduras	3	1	0	2	2	5	−3	2
Guyana	3	0	0	3	0	6	−6	0

Canada	2–0	Honduras
Mexico	2–0	Guyana
Honduras	2–0	Guyana
Mexico	1–1	Canada
Canada	2–0	Guyana
Mexico	3–0	Honduras

== Semifinals ==
Canada	1 – 0 (aet)	El Salvador

Mexico	1–0	United States

== Third place match ==
El Salvador	4–2	United States

== Final ==
Mexico	2–1	Canada

1984 CONCACAF U-20 Championship

Mexico
Eighth title

== Qualification to World Youth Championship ==
The two best performing teams qualified for the 1985 FIFA World Youth Championship.

- Canada
- Mexico
