= 1978 CONCACAF Champions' Cup =

14th edition of premier club football tournament organized by CONCACAF

Copa de Campeones Concacaf
- Dates: 1 May – 17 September 1978

Final positions
- Champions: (Guatemala) Comunicaciones (Trinidad and Tobago) Defence Force (Mexico) Leones Negros

The 1978 CONCACAF Champions' Cup was the 14th edition of the annual international club football competition held in the CONCACAF region (North America, Central America and the Caribbean), the CONCACAF Champions' Cup. It determined that year's club champion of association football in the CONCACAF region and was played from 1 May until 17 September 1978 and all the matches in the tournament were played under the home/away match system.

The teams were split into 3 zones (North American, Central American and Caribbean), each one qualifying the winner to the final tournament, where the winners of the North American and Central American zones played a semi-final to decide who was going to play against the Caribbean champion in the final.

As the final part of the tournament was cancelled due to administrative problems, three teams, Comunicaciones (Guatemala) Defence Force (Trinidad and Tobago) and Leones Negros de Guadalajara (Mexico) were crowned champions by CONCACAF.

== North American Zone ==
=== First round ===
| Team 1 | Agg. | Team 2 | 1st leg | 2nd leg |
|---|---|---|---|---|
| UNAM (Mexico) | w/o^{1} | (United States) Maccabi Los Angeles | | |

^{1} Maccabi Los Angeles withdrew.

=== Second round ===
| Team 1 | Agg. | Team 2 | 1st leg | 2nd leg |
|---|---|---|---|---|
| UNAM (Mexico) | 0 - 2 | (Mexico) U de G | 0 - 1 | 0 - 1 |

| UNAM (Mexico) | 0–1 | (Mexico) U de G | Mexico City, Mexico |
| | | Belarmino de Almeida | Stadium: Estadio Olímpico Universitario |

| U de G (Mexico) | 1-0 (2-0 agg.) | (Mexico) UNAM | Jalisco, Mexico |
| Octavio de Jesús | | | Stadium: Estadio Jalisco |

== Central American Zone ==
=== First round ===
Torneo Centroamericano de Concacaf 1978

| Team 1 | Agg. | Team 2 | 1st leg | 2nd leg |
|---|---|---|---|---|
| Saprissa (Costa Rica) | 11–0 | (Nicaragua) Diriangén | 6–0 | 5–0 |
| Cartaginés (Costa Rica) | 1–3 | (El Salvador) FAS | 0–2 | 1–1 |
| Municipal (Guatemala) | 8–1 | (Nicaragua) CD UCA | 5–1 | 3–0 |
| Comunicaciones (Guatemala) | 5–2 | (El Salvador) Once Municipal | 3–1 | 2–1 |

| 7 May 1978 | Saprissa (Costa Rica) | 6–0 | (Nicaragua) Diriangén | San Juan de Tibás, Costa Rica |
| | Miguel Ángel Mansilla 30' 57' 64' 89'; Gerardo Laterza; Nelson Bastos 43' | | | Stadium: Estadio Ricardo Saprissa Aymá |

| 9 May 1978 | Diriangén (Nicaragua) | 0–5 (0–11 agg.) | (Costa Rica) Saprissa | San Juan de Tibás, Costa Rica |
| | | | Guillermo Valenciano 13' 32' 86'; Marco Valverde 55'; Hernán Morales 65' | Stadium: Estadio Ricardo Saprissa Aymá |

14 May 1978

| Cartaginés (Costa Rica) | 0–2 | (El Salvador) FAS |
|---|---|---|
| | | Jorge Gonzalez; David Arnoldo Cabrera |

Estadio Jose Rafael "Fello" Meza Ivankovich, Cartago, Costa Rica
28 May 1978

| FAS (El Salvador) | 1–1 | (Costa Rica) Cartaginés |
|---|---|---|
| Eduardo Valdez | | Oscar Manuel Caceres |

Estadio Óscar Quiteño, Santa Ana, El Salvador

4 June 1978

| Comunicaciones (Guatemala) | 3–1 | (El Salvador) Once Municipal |
|---|---|---|
| Guillermo Dubon; Felix McDonald; Byron Perez | | Goal |

Estadio Doroteo Guamuch Flores, Guatemala City, Guatemala
10 June 1978
Second leg

| Once Municipal (El Salvador) | 1–2 | (Guatemala) Comunicaciones |
|---|---|---|
| Juan Ramon Martinez | | Ramon Zambrina |

Estadio Cuscatlán, San Salvador, El Salvador

21 May 1978

| Municipal (Guatemala) | 5–1 | (Nicaragua) CD UCA |
|---|---|---|
| Miguel Cruz; TBD; TBD; TBD | | TBD |

Estadio Doroteo Guamuch Flores, Guatemala City, Guatemala
28 May 1978
Second leg

| CD UCA (Nicaragua) | 1–3 | (Guatemala) Municipal |
|---|---|---|
| TBD | | Julio César Anderson; TBD |

Estadio Stanley Cayasso, Managua, Nicaragua

=== Second round ===
| Team 1 | Agg. | Team 2 | 1st leg | 2nd leg |
|---|---|---|---|---|
| Saprissa (Costa Rica) | 2–1 | (El Salvador) FAS | 0–0 | 2–1 |
| Comunicaciones (Guatemala) | 2–0 | (Guatemala) Municipal | 2–0 | 0–0 |

| 4 June 1978 | Saprissa (Costa Rica) | 0–0 | (El Salvador) FAS | San Juan de Tibás, Costa Rica |
| | | | | Stadium: Estadio Ricardo Saprissa Aymá |

| 11 June 1978 | FAS (El Salvador) | 1–2 (1–2 agg.) | (Costa Rica) Saprissa | Santa Ana, El Salvador |
| | TBD | | Emilio Valle | Stadium: Estadio Óscar Quiteño |

| 5 July 1978 | Comunicaciones (Guatemala) | 2–0 | (Guatemala) Municipal | Guatemala City, Guatemala |
| | Oscar Sanchez | | | Stadium: Estadio Doroteo Guamuch Flores |

| 16 July 1978 | Municipal (Guatemala) | 0–0 (0–2 agg.) | (Guatemala) Comunicaciones | Guatemala City, Guatemala |
| | | | | Stadium: Estadio Doroteo Guamuch Flores |

=== Third round ===
| Team 1 | Agg. | Team 2 | 1st leg | 2nd leg |
|---|---|---|---|---|
| Saprissa (Costa Rica) | 0–3 | (Guatemala) Comunicaciones | 0–1 | 0–2 |

| 6 August 1978 | Saprissa (Costa Rica) | 0–1 | (Guatemala) Comunicaciones | San Juan de Tibás, Costa Rica |
| | | | | Stadium: Estadio Ricardo Saprissa Aymá |

| 13 August 1978 | Comunicaciones (Guatemala) | 2–0 (3–0 agg.) | (Costa Rica) Saprissa | Guatemala City, Guatemala |
| | | | | Stadium: Estadio Doroteo Guamuch Flores |

== Caribbean Zone ==
=== First round ===
| Team 1 | Agg. | Team 2 | 1st leg | 2nd leg |
|---|---|---|---|---|
| Jong Holland (Netherlands Antilles) | 2–4 | (Suriname) Transvaal | 0–0 | 2–4 |
| Defence Force (Trinidad and Tobago) | 4–2 | (Guyana) Thomas United | 1–0 | 3–2 |
| Voorwaarts (Suriname) | 3–2 | (Trinidad and Tobago) TECSA | 2–1 | 1–1 |
| Pele (Guyana) | 5–2 | (Netherlands Antilles) RCA | 3–1 | 2–1 |

| Jong Holland (Netherlands Antilles) | 0-0 | (Suriname) Transvaal |

| Transvaal (Guadeloupe) | 4-2 (4-2 agg.) | (Netherlands Antilles) Jong Holland |

| Defence Force (Trinidad and Tobago) | 1–0 | (Guyana) Thomas United |

| Thomas United (Guyana) | 2-3 (2-4 agg.) | (Trinidad and Tobago) Defence Force |

| Voorwaarts (Suriname) | 2-1 | (Guadeloupe) TECSA |

| TECSA (Guadeloupe) | 1-1 (2-3 agg.) | (Suriname) Voorwaarts |

| Pele (Guyana) | 3-1 | (Netherlands Antilles) RCA |

| RCA (Netherlands Antilles) | 1-2 | (Guyana) Pele |

Voorwaarts, Transvaal, Pele and Defence Force advanced to the second round

=== Second round ===
| Team 1 | Agg. | Team 2 | 1st leg | 2nd leg |
|---|---|---|---|---|
| Transvaal (Suriname) | 2–4 | (Trinidad and Tobago) Defence Force | 1–1 | 1–3 |
| Voorwaarts (Suriname) | 5–2 | (Guyana) Pele | 5–1 | 0–1 |

| Transvaal (Suriname) | 1-1 | (Trinidad and Tobago) Defence Force |

| Defence Force (Trinidad and Tobago) | 3-1 (4-2 agg.) | (Suriname) Transvaal |

| Voorwaarts (Suriname) | 5-1 | (Guyana) Pele |

| Pele (Guyana) | 1-0 (2-5 agg.) | (Suriname) Voorwaarts |

Voorwaarts and Defence Force advanced to the third round

=== Third round ===
| Team 1 | Agg. | Team 2 | 1st leg | 2nd leg |
|---|---|---|---|---|
| Voorwaarts (Suriname) | 1–4 | (Trinidad and Tobago) Defence Force | 1–2 | 0–2 |

| Voorwaarts (Suriname) | 1-2 | (Trinidad and Tobago) Defence Force |

| Defence Force (Trinidad and Tobago) | 2-0 (4-1 agg.) | (Suriname) Voorwaarts |

(Trinidad and Tobago) Defence Force qualified to the CONCACAF Final Series

== CONCACAF final series ==
The final series was scratched and the three qualifying teams declared joint champions due to administrative problems and disagreements over the dates for the matches.

== Champions ==
CONCACAF Champions' Cup
1978
