= GFF Women's Championship =

- Founded: 2018
- Country: Guyana
- Confederation: CONCACAF
- Number of clubs: 6
- Level on pyramid: 1
- Current champions: Conquerors

The GFF National Women's League, often referred to as GFF Always National Women's League for sponsor reasons, is the top level of the women's football system in Guyana. Contested by 6 clubs. The competition was formed in 2018 as a 7 versus 7 competition, from the 2019-20 the season is 11 versus 11. Matches in the competition take 70 minutes (2 times 35 minutes).

== Teams ==
- Foxy Ladies (Den Amstel)
- Panthers (Georgetown)
- Conquerors (Georgetown)
- Guyana Defence Force (Georgetown)
- Guyana Police Force (Georgetown)
- Santos (Georgetown)

== Champions ==
- 2019-20: Conquerors

== Top goalscorers ==
Season	Player	Team	Goals
2022	(Guyana) Analissa Vincent	Police	19
2025	(Guyana) Sandra Johnson	Defence Force	35
