= Guyana Mayors Cup =

The Guyana Mayors Cup is a major knockout regional football tournament in Guyana. It was created in 1999.

It is an annual inter-ward/village Football Championship only open to invited teams. It takes place at the Georgetown Football Club ground, proposed alternate locations include Bourda, Mahaicony Community Centre, Victoria Community Centre and the Den Amstel Community Centre grounds. It is coordinated by former national football coach Lennox Arthur.

It was originally between teams in Georgetown, but was expanded to invite teams throughout the country. The number of teams increased from 20 to 24 in 2016

The tournament planned for October 2020 was rescheduled due to COVID-19. It has also been rescheduled in previous years to avoid conflicting with other major regional tournaments such as the Kashif & Shanghai Knockout Tournament.

== Winners ==
- 1998/99 : Real Victoria Kings 2–0 Thomas United (Georgetown)
- 1999/00 : Conquerors (Georgetown) 2–1 Beacon's (Georgetown)
- 2000/01 : Conquerors (Georgetown) 0–0 [1–0 pen] Santos
- 2001/02 : Thomas United (Georgetown) 1–0 Camptown (Georgetown)
- 2002/03 : Camptown (Georgetown) and Pele (Georgetown)
- 2003/04 : Camptown (Georgetown) 0–0 [4–2 pen] Conquerors (Georgetown)
- 2004/05 : Pele (Georgetown) 3–0 Western Tigers (Georgetown)
- 2005/06 : Conquerors (Georgetown) 3–2 Western Tigers (Georgetown)
- 2006/07 : Pele (Georgetown) 2–1 Conquerors (Georgetown)
- 2007/08 : Alpha United (Georgetown) 4–3 [aet] Conquerors (Georgetown)
- 2008/09 : Pele (Georgetown) 1–0 Camptown (Georgetown)
- 2009/10 : Guyana Defence Force (Georgetown) 0–0 [aet, 6–5 pen] Santos (Georgetown)
- 2011 : Camptown (Georgetown) 2–0 Conquerors (Georgetown)
- 2013 : Alpha United (Georgetown) 1-0 Slingerz FC (Vergenoegen)
- 2015 : Slingerz FC (Vergenoegen) 5-0 Western Tigers (Georgetown)
