= Glenroy Samuel (footballer, born 1990) =

Trinidad and Tobago footballer

Glenroy Samuel (born April 5, 1990 in San Juan) is a Trinidad and Tobago footballer who plays as a goalkeeper for Morvant Caledonia United and the Trinidad and Tobago national team.

== Honours ==
Morvant Caledonia United

- FA Trophy: 2012–13

North East Stars

- FA Trophy: 2014–15
