= Cristian Ortiz (footballer, born 2007) =

Dominican footballer (born 2007)

Personal information
- Full name: Cristian Ortiz
- Date of birth: April 23, 2007 (age 19)
- Place of birth: White Plains, New York, United States
- Height: 6 ft 1 in (1.85 m)
- Position: Striker

Youth career
- –2024: Florida Premier

Senior career*
Years	Team	Apps	(Gls)
2024–2025	Tampa Bay Rowdies	7	(0)
2025	→ Columbus Crew 2 (loan)	23	(3)

International career^{‡}
2024–	Dominican Republic U20	3	(0)
2024–	Dominican Republic	1	(0)
- * Club domestic league appearances and goals as of 23 July 2025 ‡ National team caps and goals as of 10 September 2024

Cristian Ortiz (born April 23, 2007) is a professional footballer. Born in the United States, he is a youth international for the Dominican Republic.

== Club career ==
Ortiz moved from New York to Port Richey, Florida at a young age. In March 2024, he signed a USL Academy Contract with the Tampa Bay Rowdies after playing for local youth clubs that were affiliated with the professional team. He then made his league debut on March 24, and would go on to became the first player to sign a professional contract from the Rowdies' academy system two months later.

On 7 February 2025, the Rowdies announced that they had loaned Ortiz to MLS Next Pro side Columbus Crew 2 for the 2025 season.

== Career statistics ==
=== Club ===
Appearances and goals by club, season and competition
Club	Season	League			National cup		Continental		Total	
Club	Season	Division	Apps	Goals	Apps	Goals	Apps	Goals	Apps	Goals
Tampa Bay Rowdies	2024	USL Championship	7	0	2	0	–	–	9	0
Columbus Crew 2(Loan)	2025	MLS Next	23	3	3	1	–	–	26	4
Career total			30	3	5	1	0	0	35	4

== International career ==
After making senior level appearances for the Rowdies in the USL Championship, Ortiz was called up to represent the Dominican Republic under-20 team in the 2024 CONCACAF U-20 Championship.
