= Kashif & Shanghai Knockout Tournament =

The Kashif & Shanghai Knockout Tournament was a knockout tournament of the Guyana football. It was created in 1990.

It was the most important cup tournament drawing large crowds, played in December and January every season. The first two editions were restricted to teams from Linden (4 participants 1990/91; in 1991/92 all seven clubs from Linden entered); since 1992/93 teams from outside Linden (or indeed Guyana) could also enter.

The first 18 years, the Mackenzie Sports Club ground was the venue for this event until it was moved to Guyana’s National Stadium at Providence.

== Winners ==
Event winners by year:

- 1990/91 : Milerock (Linden) 2-1 Eagles United (Linden)
- 1991/92 : Eagles United (Linden) bt Milerock (Linden)
- 1992/93 : Botafogo (Linden) drw Central Hikers (Linden) [trophy shared]
- 1993/94 : Camptown (Georgetown) 3-2 Eagles United (Linden)
- 1994/95 : Topp XX (Linden) 2-1 Milerock (Linden)
- 1995/96 : Beacon's (Georgetown) bt Thomas United (Georgetown) [2-0?]
- 1996/97 : Topp XX (Linden) 3-0 Pele (Georgetown)
- 1997/98 : Milerock (Linden) bt Pele (Georgetown)
- 1998/99 : Doc's Khelwalaas (Trinidad) 2-1 Real Victoria Kings
- 1999/00 : Topp XX (Linden) 3-1 Conquerors (Georgetown)
- 2000/01 : Topp XX (Linden) 1-1 Camptown (Georgetown) [4-2 pen]
- 2001/02 : Real Victoria Kings 2-2 Netrockers (Linden) [aet; 5-4 pen]
- 2002/03 : Conquerors (Georgetown) 1-0 Western Tigers (Georgetown)
- 2003/04 : Camptown (Georgetown) 1-0 Topp XX (Linden)
- 2004/05 : Conquerors (Georgetown) 4-1 Dennery (Saint Lucia)
- 2005/06 : Topp XX (Linden) 1-0 Alpha United (Georgetown)
- 2006/07 : Joe Public F.C. (Trinidad) 1-0 Topp XX (Linden)
- 2007/08 : Alpha United (Georgetown) 1-0 Topp XX (Linden)
- 2008/09 : Pele (Georgetown) 1-0 Camptown (Georgetown)
- 2009/10 : Western Tigers (Georgetown) 2-0 Alpha United (Georgetown)
- 2010/11 : Alpha United (Georgetown) 3-2 Pele (Georgetown)
- 2011/12 : Caledonia AIA (Trinidad) 2-0 Pele (Georgetown)
- 2012/13 : Buxton United 0-0 Amelia's Ward United [aet; 5-4 pen]
- 2013/14 : Wismar/Christianburg SS 1-1 Ash Education Institute [4-2 pen] (contested by school teams)
- 2015 : Slingerz FC (Vergenoegen) 2-0 Alpha United (Georgetown)
