= Guyana Defence Force Ground =

Cricket ground in Georgetown, Guyana

Guyana Defence Force Ground Camp
- Camp Ayanganna Cricket Ground
- Interactive map of Guyana Defence Force Ground Camp

Ground information
- Location: Georgetown, Guyana
- Country: Guyana
- Coordinates: 6.8235°N 58.1447°W
- Establishment: c. 1981
- Capacity: 2,000

Team information
Demerara (cricket)	(1987/88)
Defence Force (football)
- As of 4 February 2022; Source: Ground profile

The Guyana Defence Force Ground is a multi-use stadium on Vlissengen Road in Georgetown, Guyana.

Owned by the Guyana Defence Force and based within Camp Ayanganna, it is used mostly for football matches and athletics competitions, though in the past it has hosted one first-class cricket match. This match was the final of the Guystac Trophy between Demerara and Berbice in October 1987. The match saw both Rudolph Doodnauth of Berbice and Clyde Butts of Demerara take five wicket hauls, with the match ending in a draw. With a capacity of 2,000, the ground is used by the Defence Force as their home ground.

== See also ==
- List of cricket grounds in the West Indies
