= Guyana national under-20 football team =

National association football team representing Guyana

Guyana Under-20
- Nickname: Golden Jaguars
- Confederation: CONCACAF (North America)
- Head coach: Marco Bonofiglio
- FIFA code: GUY
First colours	Second colours

CONCACAF Under-20 Championship
- Appearances: 2 (first in 1984)
- Best result: Second round (1984)

The Guyana national U-20 football team (also known as Guyana Under-20s or Guyana U-20s) is the junior national football team representing Guyana. They most recently took part in the CONCACAF Under-20 Championship.

== Players ==
=== Current squad ===
The following players were called up for the 2026 CONCACAF U-20 Championship between 25 July – 9 August 2026.

Caps and goals correct as of 28 February 2026, after the match against Anguilla.

No.	Pos.	Player	Date of birth (age)	Caps	Goals	Club
	GK	Emmanuel Lewis	12 April 2007 (age 19)	5	0	(Guyana Football Federation) Slingerz
	GK	Jermine Mitchell		0	0	(Guyana Football Federation) Santos
	GK	Tejpal Nijjar	15 September 2008 (age 18)	0	0	(Royal Spanish Football Federation) Racing Madrid
	DF	Jaden Thom	25 May 2007 (age 19)	3	0	(Guyana Football Federation) Police
	DF	Max Robinson	22 September 2008 (age 18)	2	0	(United States Soccer Federation) Shattuck-Saint Mary's
	DF	Walker Shabazz-Edwards	4 May 2007 (age 19)	2	0	(The Football Association) Ipswich Town
	DF	Troy Andrews	1 September 2007 (age 19)	1	0	(Guyana Football Federation) Santos
	DF	Jaden Harris	27 April 2008 (age 18)	1	0	(Guyana Football Federation) Guyana Defence Force
	DF	Candle Hazel	3 March 2008 (age 18)	1	0	(Guyana Football Federation) Santos
	MF	Mateo Clark	25 April 2007 (age 19)	2	1	(Canadian Soccer Association) Vancouver Whitecaps
	MF	Shaquan David	14 March 2008 (age 18)	2	0	(Guyana Football Federation) Slingerz
	MF	Quaency Fraser	1 November 2008 (age 17)	2	0	(Guyana Football Federation) Guyana Defence Force
	MF	Jamal Fraser	23 November 2008 (age 17)	2	0	(Guyana Football Federation) Western Tigers
	MF	Mark Phillips	5 November 2007 (age 18)	2	0	(Guyana Football Federation) Western Tigers
	MF	Luke Langevine	21 February 2008 (age 18)	1	0	(Guyana Football Federation) Guyana Defence Force
	MF	Michael Joseph	23 May 2008 (age 18)	0	0	(Guyana Football Federation) Slingerz
	FW	Bryan Wharton	28 August 2007 (age 19)	6	3	(Guyana Football Federation) Slingerz
	FW	Sheldon Kendall	31 December 2007 (age 18)	2	2	(The Football Association) Millwall
	FW	Reiss Elliott-Parris	4 November 2007 (age 18)	1	1	(The Football Association) Tottenham Hotspur
	FW	Dakarai Drakes	13 March 2008 (age 18)	2	0	(United States Soccer Federation) Metropolitan Oval Academy
	FW	Isaiah Ifill	10 May 2008 (age 18)	2	0	(Guyana Football Federation) Guyana Defence Force
