= Synthetic Track and Field Facility =

Multi-sport facility in Leonora, Guyana

- Interactive map of Synthetic Track and Field Facility
- Location: Leonora, Guyana
- Coordinates: 6.86798°N 58.28111°W
- Surface: Grass

Construction
- Opened: 2015
- Cost: G$1.084 billion

Tenant
- Slingerz FC

The Synthetic Track and Field Facility in Leonora, Guyana, is a 3000-seat multi-sport facility that is used by football club Slingerz FC as their home stadium. It is also used to host youth sports events. In 2018, it hosted six matches of the 2018 CONCACAF Women's Championship qualification, three featuring Guyana and three featuring other teams.

== Construction ==
Costing approximately G$1.084 billion (US$5.2 million), the facility officially began construction in December 2010 and was split into two phases. Phase one consisted of drain and irrigation works and the main access road, whilst Phase two consisted of making the actual track and other sports fields.

Early on, the facility was scheduled to be opened on 27 March 2015, but was postponed 17 April.

== See also ==
- Football in Guyana
