= Pele FC =

- Full name: Pele Football Club
- Founded: 1971; 54 years ago
- Ground: Georgetown, Guyana
- League: GFF Elite League
- Website: 0047AB
Home colours	Away colours

Pele FC is a Guyanese football club based in Georgetown, competing in the GFF Elite League, the top tier of Guyanese football. The club was founded in 1971 and is named after Brazilian football legend Pelé.

== Honors ==
=== League titles ===
- Guyana National Football League
  - Runners-up (2): 1995–96, 2012–13
- Georgetown region championships
  - Champions (8): 1976, 1977, 1978, Unknown^{*}, 1988–89, 1989, 1991, 1996

^{*}One other championship between 1980 and 1985

=== Cups ===
- Guyana Mayors Cup
  - Winners (3): 2004–05, 2006–07, 2008–09
  - Runners-up (1): 2002–03
- Kashif & Shanghai Cup
  - Winners (1): 2008–09
  - Runners-up (4): 1996–97, 1997–98, 2010–11, 2011–12
- Sweet 16 Knockout Tournament
  - Winners (1): 2004
- NaMilCo Cup
  - Winners (1): 2006
  - Runners-up (1): 2005–06
- Brazilian Challenge Cup
  - Winners (1): 1973

== Performance in CONCACAF competitions ==
Pele's score listed first, as well as the home leg.

- 1977 CONCACAF Champions' Cup

First Round v. (Suriname) Voorwaarts — 2–0, 1–4

- 1978 CONCACAF Champions' Cup

First Round v. (Haiti) Racing CH — 3–1, 2–1
Second Round v. (Suriname) Voorwaarts — 1–0, 1–5

== See also ==
- Football in Guyana
- GFF Elite League
