= Monedderlust FC =

- Full name: Monedderlust Football Club
- Ground: Berbice, Guyana
- League: GFF Elite League
- 2025: 6th

Monedderlust FC is a Guyanese football club based in Berbice, competing in the GFF Elite League, the top tier of Guyanese football. They competed in the inaugural season of the Elite League in 2015.

== Honours ==
- Berbice regional champions

Winners (2): 2006, 2007
