= Georgetown FC =

Football Club

- Full name: Georgetown Football Club
- Founded: 1902
- Ground: Georgetown Cricket Club; Georgetown, Guyana
- Capacity: 20,000
- League: GFF Elite League

Georgetown FC is a Guyanese football club based in Georgetown, competing in the GFF Elite League, the top tier of Guyanese football.

Its home ground is across the road from the Guyana Zoo and Botanical Gardens.

== History ==
Founded in 1902, Georgetown FC is the oldest club in Guyana. In 2015, Georgetown became an inaugural member of the GFF Elite League.
