= Santos FC (Guyana) =

Santos Georgetown
- Full name: Santos Georgetown
- Founded: 1964; 62 years ago
- Ground: Georgetown Football Stadium
- Capacity: 2,000
- League: GFF Elite League
- 2025: GFF Elite League, 5th of 10
Home colours	Away colours	Third colours

Santos FC is a Guyanese professional football club based in Georgetown. Founded in 1964, the club competes in the GFF Elite League, the top league of football in Guyana.
