= Georgetown Football Stadium =

Sports venue in Guyana

- Interactive map of Georgetown Football Stadium
- Location: Georgetown, Guyana
- Coordinates: 6.80821°N 58.14893°W
- Capacity: 2,000
- Surface: Grass

Tenant
- Pele FC

Georgetown Football Stadium is a multi-use stadium on Vlissengen Road in Georgetown, Guyana. It is currently used mostly for football matches. The stadium holds 2,000 people.

It formerly hosted international venues. It's the main venue for local teams in the GFF Elite League: GDF, Milerock, Santos, and the Western Tigers.

== See also ==
- Bourda
- Providence Stadium
