= Guyana Football Federation =

National Football association of Guyana

CONCACAF
- Short name: GFF
- Founded: 1902; 124 years ago
- Headquarters: Georgetown
- FIFA affiliation: 1968; 58 years ago
- CONCACAF affiliation: 1961; 65 years ago
- President: Wayne Forde
- Website: Guyana Football Federation

The Guyana Football Federation is the governing body of football in Guyana. It controls the Guyana national football team and the Guyana women's national football team. The GFF has sanctioned the Elite League as the highest tier of football in the country.
