= Victoria Kings FC =

- Full name: Victoria Kings Football Club
- Nickname: Kings
- League: GFF Elite League
- 2019: GFF Elite League, 9th of 10

Victoria Kings FC is a Guyanese football club in Victoria. The club competes in the GFF Elite League, the top league of football in Guyana. They have a fierce rivalry with fellow eastern side, Buxton United. The club's motto is Discipline is the Gateway to Excellence.
