= Slingerz FC =

- Full name: Slingerz Football Club
- Ground: Synthetic Track and Field Facility; Guyana
- Capacity: 3,000
- Chairman: Jim Leslie
- Manager: Geraldus Montgomery
- League: GFF Elite League
- 2025: Champions of 10

Slingerz FC is a Guyanese football club based in Vergenoegen. The club competes in the GFF Elite League, the top tier of football in Guyana.

Founded in 2013, the club never qualified for the GFF National Super League, the top football league in Guyana at the time. However, the team has been very successful in Guyana's many cup competitions, including winning the Mayors Cup, Guyana's top cup competition, in 2015 after finishing runners-up in the previous tournament in 2013. The team has also finished champions or runners-up in several smaller cup competitions. In 2015, the club was an inaugural member of Guyana's new first division, the GFF Elite League.

== Results ==
=== International ===
Results list Slingerz FC's goal tally first.

Win Draw Loss Fixture

Competition	Round	Club	Score
2026 CFU Club Shield	First Round	(Turks and Caicos Islands) SWA Sharks	4–0
2026 CFU Club Shield	Round of 16	(Trinidad and Tobago) Prison Service	4–3
2026 CFU Club Shield	Quarter-finals	(Suriname) Robinhood	0–4

== Honors ==
=== League titles ===
- Guyana National Football League
  - Winners (2): 2015–16, 2025
- West Demerara Senior League
  - Winners (1): 2013

=== Cups ===
- Guyana Mayors Cup
  - Winners (1): 2015
  - Runners-up (1): 2013
- GFA Banks Beer Knockout Tournament
  - Winners (1): 2013–14
- Go For Gold Extravaganza
  - Runners-up (1): 2013

== See also ==
- Football in Guyana
- GFF National Super League
