= Football in Guyana =

- Country: Guyana
- Governing body: Guyana Football Federation
- National team: Men's national team
- First played: 1862

National competitions
- GFF National Super League; GFF Elite League; GFF Super 16; GFF Turbo Knockout Tournament; GFF Women's Championship

Club competitions
- Guyana Mayors Cup

International competitions
- CONCACAF Champions League; CONCACAF League; Caribbean Club Shield; FIFA Club World Cup; CONCACAF Gold Cup (National Team); CONCACAF Nations League (National Team); FIFA World Cup (National Team); CONCACAF Women's Championship (National Team); FIFA Women's World Cup (National Team)

The sport of football in the country of Guyana is run by the Guyana Football Federation. Football is the second most popular sport of Guyana, after cricket. The association administers the national football team, as well as the national football league. However, the Guyana National Team has not played a game since November 2012 due to on-going off-field disputes.

Despite Guyana being located in South America, the GFF is a member of the Confederation of North, Central America and Caribbean Association Football.

== League ==
GFF Elite League is the national professional league in Guyana.

== National team ==
28 January 1921 was when Guyana played its debut international match.

Guyana experienced a decline in performances in the 2000s.

Guyana qualified for Gold Cup for the first time in 2019 CONCACAF Gold Cup.

== Football stadiums in Guyana ==
This lists contains stadiums in Guyana which are used for association football. Note that the two largest stadiums in Guyana are also used for cricket.

#	Stadium	Capacity	City	Tenants	Main use	Image
1	Providence Stadium	20,000	Providence	Guyana Amazon Warriors	Association football, cricket	
2	Georgetown Cricket Club Ground	10,000	Georgetown		Association football, cricket	

== See also ==
- Lists of stadiums
