= Alpha United FC =

- Full name: Alpha United Football Club
- Nickname: The Hammer
- Founded: 1994; 32 years ago
- Ground: Bourda Cricket Ground
- Capacity: 10,000
- President: Odinga Lumumba
- Head Coach: Wayne Dover
- League: GFF Elite League
- 2019: 1st
Home colours	Away colours

Alpha United Football Club is a Guyanese football club based in Providence. The club competes in the GFF Elite League, the top league of football in Guyana. They were league champions in the 2009–10, 2010, 2012, 2012–13, and 2013–14 seasons.

In 2011, Alpha United gained recognition as being the first Guyanese football club to qualify for the CONCACAF Champions League, North America's premier continental club tournament. Alpha United earned berth into the Champions League by finishing in third place in the subcontinental tournament, the CFU Club Championship, which they earned a berth into through winning the National Super League.

They finished third in the 2011 CFU-CC and qualified for the preliminary round of the 2011–12 CONCACAF Champions League, becoming the first club from Guyana to play in the CONCACAF Champions League. In the playoff for third place, Alpha United created history by beating Trinidad and Tobago's Defence Force on penalty kicks (4–3) after regulation and overtime failed to break the 1–1 deadlock.

In their previous match, Alpha United met with the Puerto Rico Islanders in the 2011 CFU-CC semifinals, but after another regular time 1–1 draw, The Hammer succumbed to the 2010 Defending CFU-CC Champions 3–1 in the 30-minute overtime.

In the Champions League, Alpha United traveled to Costa Rica to take on Herediano. In their first ever Champions League match, the side fell 8–0 managing only two shots on goal. The side fared better in the second leg, at one point taking a 2–0 lead before relinquishing the lead, and settling for a 2–2 draw and a subsequent elimination from the tournament, losing 2–10 on aggregates.

Alpha United also participated in the 2009 and 2010 CFU-CCs. In 2009, The Hammer lost to Haiti's Tempête FC in their 1st Round home and away tie. In 2010, they were eliminated by Trinidad and Tobago's San Juan Jabloteh in the 2nd Round Group Stage.

== History ==
The origins of Alpha United FC are unknown, as CONCACAF's records show their foundation date as "pending". According to Rec.Sport.Soccer Statistics Foundation it appears that the club has been playing in Guyanese football competitions since the early to mid-2000s mounting their success in the later half of the 2000s. In 2009, Alpha United earned their first ever league title winning the Guyana National Football League and gaining subsequent entry into the CFU Club Championship.

Alpha United gained attention across the continent in 2011, when the club defeated the TT Pro League champions, Defence Force in the consolation match to earn a preliminary round berth in the CONCACAF Champions League, being the first ever Guyanese club in Champions League history to earn a berth.

== Colours and Badge ==
Alpha United's crest features a blue diamond with golden trim as the background. In front of the diamond is a hammer. Beneath the hammer, lies the club's motto, Unity With Strength. Above the hammer lies the club's name and their nickname, "The Hammer".

== Stadium ==
It is not known what stadium is Alpha United's permanent home, although Providence Stadium near Georgetown is serving as the host venue for United in the CONCACAF Champions League.

== Honors ==
=== Continental ===
- CFU Club Championship
  - Third Place (1): 2011

=== Domestic ===
==== League titles ====
- Guyana National Football League
  - Winners (5): 2009, 2010, 2012, 2012–13, 2013–14

=== Cups ===
- Guyana Mayors Cup
  - Winners (2): 2007–08, 2013
- GFF Super 8 Cup
  - Winners (1): 2010
- Kashif & Shanghai Cup
  - Runners-up (1): 2009–10
- NAMLICO Knock-out Tournament
  - Winners (1): 2010

== Performance in CONCACAF competitions ==
Alpha United's score listed first, as well as the home leg.

- 2009 CFU Club Championship

First round v. (Haiti) Tempête – 1:1, 0:2

- 2010 CFU Club Championship

First round v. (Cayman Islands) Elite – w/o
First round v. (Suriname) WBC – 1:1
First round v. (Guyana) Defence Force – 3:1
Second round v. (Trinidad and Tobago) San Juan Jabloteh – 0:2
Second round v. (Puerto Rico) River Plate PR – 1:1

- 2011 CFU Club Championship

Elimination stage 1 v. (Antigua and Barbuda) Bassa – w/o
Elimination stage 2 v. (Puerto Rico) River Plate PR – 0:0, 3:2
Semifinals v. Puerto Rico Islanders – 1:3 (a.e.t)
Third Place Playoff v. (Trinidad and Tobago) Defence Force – 1:1 (4:3 pen.)

- 2011–12 CONCACAF Champions League

Preliminary round v. (Costa Rica) Herediano – 2:2, 0:8

- 2014 CFU Club Championship

Group Stage v. (Trinidad and Tobago) Defence Force – 2:0
Group Stage v. (Jamaica) Harbour View – 1:0
Semifinals v. (Haiti) Valencia – Cancelled

- 2014–15 CONCACAF Champions League

Group Stage v. (Honduras) Olimpia – 0:1, 0:6
Group Stage v. (United States) Portland Timbers – 1:4, 0:6

== See also ==
- Football in Guyana
- GFF Elite League
