= Buxton United FC =

- Full name: Buxton United Football Club
- Nickname: Locomotive
- Founded: 1995
- Ground: Buxton Community Ground
- Capacity: 2,000
- League: GFF Elite League
- 2024: GFF Elite League, 10th of 10

Buxton United FC is a Guyanese football club in Buxton. The club competes in the GFF Elite League, the top league of football in Guyana.

The club was established in 1995 via a merger of Buxton SC and Olympic SC.
