= Western Tigers FC =

- Full name: Western Tigers Football Club
- Founded: 1976
- Ground: Georgetown Football Stadium; Georgetown, Guyana
- Capacity: 2,000
- League: GFF Elite League
- 2025: GFF Elite League, 4th of 10
Home colours	Away colours

Western Tigers FC is a Guyanese football club in Georgetown. The club competes in the GFF Elite League, the top league of football in Guyana.

== History ==
Founded in 1976 in the western region of the capital city of Georgetown, Western Tigers have won one league title in their history, in 1994–95.

Western Tigers participated internationally in the 1995 CONCACAF Cup Winners Cup, losing to Jong Colombia of the Netherlands Antilles 6–4 on aggregate.
