= GFF Elite League =

- Founded: 2015
- Country: Guyana
- Confederation: CONCACAF
- Number of clubs: 10
- Level on pyramid: 1
- International cup: Caribbean Club Shield
- Current champions: Slingerz (2025)
- Most championships: Defence Force (3 times)
- Top scorer: Neron Barrow (61 goals)
- Website: GFF Elite League
- Current: 2026 GFF Elite League

The Elite League, often referred to as GFF Elite League, is the top level of the football system in Guyana. Contested by 10 clubs, it operates on a system of promotion and relegation. Top level before GFF Elite League was GFF National Super League.

The competition was formed as the Stag Elite League in 2015 following a hiatus for the 2014-15 season. Its inaugural season consisted of 8 of the 11 FIFA licensed teams from Guyana. The league expanded to 10 teams for its second season, but four teams pulled out before the season began.

11,000 people attended the 90 matches 2024 edition of the GFF Elite League, resulting in an average attendance of 122 per game.

== 2023 teams ==
Team	Location	Stadium	Capacity
Ann's Grove United	Georgetown		
Buxton United	Buxton	Buxton Community Ground	2,000
Den Amstel	Uitvlugt		
Fruta Conquerors	Georgetown	Georgetown Football Stadium	2,000
Guyana Defence Force	Georgetown	Guyana Defence Force Ground	2,000
Guyana Police Force	Georgetown		
Milerock	Linden	Mackenzie Sports Club	1,000
Santos	Georgetown	Georgetown Football Stadium	2,000
Victoria Kings	Victoria		
Western Tigers	Georgetown	Georgetown Football Stadium	2,000

== Champions ==
Ed.	Season	Champion	Runner-up
1	2015–16	Slingerz	Alpha United
2	2016–17	Guyana Defence Force	Fruta Conquerors
3	2017–18	Fruta Conquerors	Guyana Defence Force
4	2019	Fruta Conquerors	Western Tigers
–	2020	Cancelled due to the COVID-19 pandemic.	
–	2021	Cancelled due to the COVID-19 pandemic.	
–	2022	No tournament.	
5	2023	Guyana Defence Force	Western Tigers
6	2024	Guyana Defence Force	Slingerz
7	2025	Slingerz	Guyana Police Force

== Performance by club (GFF Elite League and GFF National Super League) ==
Club	City	Titles	Years
Alpha United	Georgetown	5	2009–10, 2010, 2012, 2012–13, 2013–14
Santos	Georgetown	3	1990, 1991–92, 1998
Fruta Conquerors	Georgetown	3	2000–01, 2017–18, 2019
Guyana Defence Force	Georgetown	3	2016-17, 2023, 2024
Slingerz	Vergenoegen	2	2015–16, 2024–25
Topp XX	Linden	2	1992, 1997
Western Tigers	Georgetown	1	1994–95
Milerock	Linden	1	1995–96
Omai Gold Seekers	Bartica	1	1996

== Top goalscorers ==
Rank	Player	Team	Goals
2016-17	(Guyana) Sherwin Caesar	Defence Force	10
2017-18	(Guyana) Delon Lanferman	Den Amstel	19
2019	(Guyana) Delon Lanferman	Den Amstel	9
2023	(Guyana) Nicholas McArthur	Police	17
2024	(Guyana) Neron Barrow	Slingerz	18
2025	(Guyana) Neron Barrow	Defence Force	36

Most goals by a player in a single game

- 10 goals:
  - (Guyana) Neron Barrow (Defence Force) 36-0 against Mainstay Goldstar (22 September 2025).

=== Multiple hat-tricks ===
Rank	Country	Player	Hat-tricks
1	(Jamaica)	Kemar Beckford	10
2	(Guyana)	Nicholas McArthur	4
2	(Guyana)	Neron Barrow	4
4	(Guyana)	Akin Baynes	1
4	(Guyana)	Kelsie Benjamin	1
4	(Guyana)	Obumchi Benjamin	1
4	(Guyana)	Dorwin George	1
4	(Guyana)	Stephen McDonald	1
4	(Guyana)	Bevney McGarrel	1
4	(Guyana)	Olvis Mitchell	1
4	(Guyana)	Darron Niles	1
4	(Guyana)	Michael Oie	1
4	(Guyana)	Junior Redman	1
4	(Guyana)	Andrew Simmons	1
4	(Guyana)	Marcus Tudor	1
4	(Guyana)	Randolph Wagner	1
4	(Guyana)	Daniel Wilson	1

Most hat-tricks by a player in a single season

- 4 hat-tricks each:
  - Nicholas McArthur (2023)
  - Kemar Beckford (2024)

== Women's League ==
Guyana Women's Premier League
- Country: Guyana
- Current champions: Defence Force (2025-26)
- Top scorer: Sandra Johnson (64 goals)

=== Top goalscorers ===
Season	Player	Team	Goals
2025	Sandra Johnson	Defence Force	35
