= Fruta Conquerors FC =

Fruta Conquerors
- Nickname: Conquerors
- Founded: 14 February 1982; 44 years ago
- Ground: Georgetown Football Stadium
- Capacity: 2,000
- League: GFF Elite League
- 2025: GFF Elite League, 9th of 10
Home colours	Away colours

Fruta Conquerors FC is a Guyanese football club in Georgetown. The club competes in the GFF Elite League, the top league of football in Guyana. They were league champions in 2000–01, 2017–18 and 2019. The club is named for their sponsor, the beverage company Fruta. They were an inaugural member of the Elite League in 2015–16.

== Honors ==
=== League titles ===
- Guyana National Football League/GFF Elite League
  - Winners (3): 2000–01, 2017-18, 2019

=== Cups ===
- Guyana Mayors Cup
  - Winners (3): 1999–2000, 2000–01, 2005–06
  - Runners-up (4): 2003–04, 2006–07, 2007–08, 2011
- Kashif & Shanghai Cup
  - Winners (2): 2002–03, 2003–04
  - Runners-up (1): 1999–2000
- GFA Banks Beer Knockout Tournament
  - Runners-up (1): 2011–12
- Sweet 16 Knockout Tournament
  - Winners (1): 2003
  - Runners-up (1): 2010

== Performance in CONCACAF competitions ==
Fruta Conquerors's score listed first, as well as the home leg.

- 2001 CFU Club Championship

First Round v. (Trinidad and Tobago) W Connection – 2–1, 0–8

- 2006–07 CFU Club Championship

Fruta Conquerors withdrew from tournament
First Round v. (Trinidad and Tobago) W Connection – w/o
First Round v. Puerto Rico Islanders – w/o
First Round v. (Antigua and Barbuda) Hoppers – w/o

== See also ==
- Football in Guyana
- GFF Elite League
