= Guyana Defence Force FC =

- Full name: Guyana Defence Force Football Department FC
- Nicknames: Defence Force, GDF Football Club
- Founded: 1965
- Ground: Guyana Defence Force Ground
- Capacity: 2,000
- President: David A. Granger
- Manager: Rogerius Pugh
- League: GFF Elite League
- 2025: GFF Elite League, 3rd
Home colours	Away colours

Guyana Defence Force FC, colloquially known simply as Defence Force, is a Guyanese football club in Georgetown. The club competes in the GFF Elite League, the top league of football in Guyana. The club is fielded by the nation's defence force and military.
