= List of foreign TT Pro League players =

This is a list of foreign players in the TT Pro League that began league play in 1999. The following players must meet both of the following two criteria:

1. Have played at least one TT Pro League game. Players who were signed by Pro League clubs, but only played in lower league, cup and/or international matches, or did not play in any competitive games at all, are not included.
2. Are considered foreign, i.e., outside Trinidad and Tobago, if he is not eligible to play for the Trinidad and Tobago national team.

More specifically,

- If a player has been capped on international level, the national team is used; if he has been capped by more than one country, the highest level (or the most recent) team is used. These include Trinidad and Tobago players with dual citizenship.
- If a player has not been capped on international level, his country of birth is used, except those who were born abroad from Trinidad and Tobago parents or moved to Trinidad and Tobago at a young age, and those who clearly indicated to have switched his nationality to another nation.

Clubs listed are those for which the player has played at least one Pro League game and seasons for those in which the player has played at least one Pro League game. Note that seasons, not calendar years, are used. For example, "2010–13" indicates that the player has played in every season from 2010–11 to 2012–13, but not necessarily every calendar year from 2010 to 2013. Therefore, a player beginning with the 2010–11 season should always have a listing under at least two years — for instance, a player making his debut in 2011, during the 2011–12 season, will have "2011–12" after his name.

In bold: Players who have played at least one Pro League game in the current season (2013–14), and the clubs they've played for. They include players who have subsequently left the club, but do not include current players of a Pro League club who have not played a Pro League game in the current season.

Details correct as of end of 2013–14 season. Next update will remove all players from withdrawn teams and that have left their clubs from Bold status, and add newly admitted teams' players. This will be undertaken on the first day of the 2014–15 season in September 2014.

== Antigua and Barbuda ==
- Marcus Ambrose – Morvant Caledonia United – 2009
- Peter Byers – San Juan Jabloteh, Central FC – 2007–08, 2012–13
- Ranjae Christian – Joe Public – 2000
- George Dublin – Joe Public, Tobago United – 2002–08
- Gayson Gregory – San Juan Jabloteh, Joe Public – 2001–03, 2006, 2008, 2010–11
- Akeem Thomas – Morvant Caledonia United – 2012–14
- Elvis Thomas – Morvant Caledonia United – 2012–13
- Vashami Allen - Central FC - 2016-17

== Bahamas ==
- Happy Hall – Ma Pau – 2009

== Barbados ==
- **Ranaldo Bailey** – **Morvant Caledonia United** – 2015–
- Roger Proverbs – Doc's Khelwalaas – 2000

== Belize ==
- Mark Leslie – Ma Pau, North East Stars – 2004, 2006, 2008–11

== Botswana ==
- Mogogi Gabonamong – Arima Fire, Morvant Caledonia United – 2004–05
- Kagiso Tshelametsi – Arima Fire, Morvant Caledonia United – 2004–05

== Brazil ==
- Fabiano Agripino – W Connection – 2000
- Christian Almas – W Connection – 2000, 2006
- João Ananias – W Connection – 2013–14
- Rafel Goncalves Assuscas de Andrade – W Connection – 2000
- Renato Lucas Leite Ferreira de Araujo – W Connection – 2000
- Joao Paulo Santana Bezzera – Ma Pau – 2008
- Luciano Rodrigues Carreto – W Connection – 2000
- Douglas da Costa – W Connection – 2007–08
- Vincente da Costa – Joe Public – 2006
- Ricardo Severino de Oliveira – W Connection – 2003
- Célio da Silva – W Connection – 2013–14
- Danielo da Silva – W Connection – 2002
- Emerson da Silva – W Connection – 2001
- Iomar da Silva – Ma Pau – 2008
- Jorge da Silva – Joe Public – 2008
- José da Silva – W Connection – 2010–11
- Elton de Britto – Ma Pau – 2008
- Jerónimo Wendes de Sousa – North East Stars – 2011–12
- José Luiz de Sousa – W Connection – 2007
- Felinto dos Santos – W Connection – 2000
- Leandro dos Santos – Ma Pau – 2008
- Waldinei dos Santos – W Connection – 2000
- Gefferson – W Connection – 2000–08
- Eduardo Guadagnucci – W Connection – 2000
- Thiago Faria – North East Stars – 2011–12
- Luis Andre Lima – United Petrotrin – 2009
- José Maria Manoel – W Connection – 2000–02
- Joao Guilherme Mansano – W Connection – 2001
- Henrique Marcussi – W Connection – 2001
- Leandro Monção – Joe Public – 2006
- Acacio Jose dos Santos Neto – W Connection – 2000
- Francisco Neto – W Connection – 2010–11
- William Oliveira – W Connection – 2003–09
- Renato Pereira – W Connection – 2000–02, 2008–11
- Paulo Roberto – W Connection – 2000, 2010–11
- Igor de Oliviera Santos – W Connection – 2009
- Luciano Sato – W Connection – 2002
- Ronaldo Viana – W Connection, San Juan Jabloteh – 2000, 2005, 2008, 2010–11
- Jose Luciano Viera – W Connection – 2004

== Canada ==
- Bradley Beaumont - W Connection F.C. - 2015
- Maleik de Freitas - W Connection F.C. - 2015

== Colombia ==
- Eder Gilmar Arias – W Connection – 2008–11
- Carlos Carimchimbo – Doc's Khelwalaas – 2000
- Johnny Cardoña – St. Ann's Rangers – 2008
- Rudinei Cardoso – Joe Public – 2000
- Julio Fernandez de la Rosa – Tobago United – 2007
- Milton Espitia – North East Stars – 2008
- Alejandro Figueroa – Doc's Khelwalaas, San Juan Jabloteh, Joe Public, Ma Pau, W Connection – 1999–2011, 2012–14
- Carlos Fory – Doc's Khelwalaas – 2000
- Milton Gomez – W Connection, St. Ann's Rangers, North East Stars – 2006, 2008, 2010–11
- Carlos González – Joe Public, North East Stars – 2006–11
- Phanor González – Joe Public – 2006
- Yefer Lozano – W Connection – 2013–14
- Eduardo Moreno – Tobago United – 2009
- Camilo Ortega – W Connection – 2013–14
- Eduardo Ortiz – Tobago United – 2009
- Edgar Ospina – United Petrotrin – 2009
- Jerson Peñaranda – San Juan Jabloteh – 2000
- Yhon Reyes – W Connection – 2013–14
- Jair Saldaña – Joe Public – 2008
- Julian Martinez Sanchez – St. Ann's Rangers – 2010–11
- Wilson Sánchez – Doc's Khelwalaas – 2000
- John Seña – Doc's Khelwalaas – 2000
- Oscar Velasco – W Connection – 2008
- Christian Viveros – W Connection – 2008–14

== Dominica ==
- **Julian Wade** – **Morvant Caledonia United** – 2013–
- Glenson Prince - San Juan Jabloteh F.C. - 2014-15
- Anfernee Frederick - W Connection F.C. - 2016

== Dominican Republic ==
- Jonathan Faña – W Connection – 2006–09
- Miguel Lloyd – W Connection – 2008–11

== England ==
- Luke Gullick – San Juan Jabloteh – 2011–12

== Ghana ==
- Michael Yaw Darko - St. Ann's Rangers, Central
- Maestro Mensah - Morvant Caledonia United

== Grenada ==
- Kithson Bain – Morvant Caledonia United – 2013–14
- **Jamal Charles** – **W Connection** – 2015–
- Ricky Charles – St. Ann's Rangers – 2008
- Kassius Ettienne – W Connection – 2008–09
- Denron Frederick – Morvant Caledonia United – 2013–14
- **Shemel Louison** – **Morvant Caledonia United** – 2012–
- Shane Rennie – St. Ann's Rangers – 2008
- Wendell Rennie – FC South End – 2010–11
- Kennedy Hinkson

== Guyana ==
- Anthony Abrams – Joe Public, Morvant Caledonia United – 2006–07
- Brion Baker – Morvant Caledonia United – 2008–09
- Kevin Beaton – Morvant Caledonia United – 2008
- Shawn Beveney – North East Stars, Morvant Caledonia United – 2006, 2010–11
- Shawn Bishop – Morvant Caledonia United – 2005, 2007
- Dwayne Blake – Morvant Caledonia United – 2009
- Trayon Bobb – Morvant Caledonia United – 2010–13
- **Akel Clarke** – St. Ann's Rangers, **Central FC** – 2012–
- Nigel Codrington – San Juan Jabloteh, Morvant Caledonia United – 2005–09
- Devaughn Dummett – San Juan Jabloteh – 2005
- Andrew Durant – Tobago United, North East Stars – 2007–08, 2011–12
- Carey Harris – Joe Public, Tobago United, North East Stars, Central FC – 2004–14
- **Jamaal Harvey** – **Morvant Caledonia United** – 2015–
- Collie Hercules – Doc's Khelwalaas, Tobago United – 1999–2000, 2007–09
- **Sheldon Holder** – **Morvant Caledonia United** – 2011–13, 2014–
- Leslie Holligan – North East Stars, Morvant Caledonia United – 2006–07
- Selwyn Isaacs – Tobago United – 2008
- Kester Jacobs – Morvant Caledonia United – 2008–09
- Randolph Jerome – Doc's Khelwalaas, South Starworld Strikers, W Connection, Morvant Caledonia United, North East Stars – 1999–2011
- Shaun Johnson – Tobago United – 2008
- Quacy Johnson – Tobago United – 2007–08
- Pierre Joseph – Tobago United – 2008
- Tichard Joseph – Tobago United – 2008–09
- **Kareem Knights** – **Morvant Caledonia United** – 2015–
- Howard Lowe – Joe Public, North East Stars, Morvant Caledonia United – 2004–08
- Konata Mannings – Morvant Caledonia United – 2008
- Kelvin McKenzie – North East Stars – 2005, 2007–08
- Kayode McKinnon – Morvant Caledonia United, Joe Public, Tobago United, North East Stars – 2002–11
- Abassy McPherson – North East Stars, Joe Public – 2004–08
- Vurlon Mills – T&TEC, Morvant Caledonia United – 2011–13
- Walter Moore – North East Stars, Morvant Caledonia United – 2005–13
- Colin Nelson – Morvant Caledonia United – 2010–13
- Dwight Peters – Morvant Caledonia United – 2007
- Charles Pollard – Doc's Khelwalaas, W Connection, San Juan Jabloteh, Morvant Caledonia United, Joe Public, North East Stars – 2000–13
- Richard Reynolds – North East Stars, Morvant Caledonia United, Tobago United – 2004, 2007–09
- Gregory Richardson – Joe Public – 2007–08
- **Pernell Schultz** – **Morvant Caledonia United** – 2013–
- Jermine Scott – Doc's Khelwalaas – 2000
- Jamaal Smith – Morvant Caledonia United – 2013–14
- Kelvin Smith – Tobago United, North East Stars, Central FC – 2009–13
- Travis Waterton – North East Stars – 2005–06
- Ronson Williams – Morvant Caledonia United – 2011–12

== Haiti ==
- Pierre Richard Bruny – Joe Public – 2001–02
- Peterson Desrivieres – Joe Public – 2008
- Gabriel Michel – W Connection – 2001
- Elusma Pierre – Joe Public – 2008
- Chrismonor Telsuma – W Connection – 2001
- Ulterguens St. Victor – Joe Public – 2008
- Fortunato Valcourt – St. Ann's Rangers – 2009–12

== Jamaica ==
- Nicholas Addlery – South Starworld Strikers, San Juan Jabloteh – 2003–05
- Jacomeno Barrett – Joe Public – 2007–08
- Oneke Ford – Morvant Caledonia United, North East Stars – 2005–06
- Sean Fraser – North East Stars – 2010–11
- Leon Gordon – North East Stars – 2011–12
- Kevin Graham – Morvant Caledonia United – 2009–12, 2013–14
- Christopher Harvey – W Connection, Joe Public – 2004–06, 2008
- Lamar Hodges – Joe Public – 2010–11
- Jermaine Hue – W Connection – 2004
- Keith Kelly – San Juan Jabloteh – 2005
- Kevin Lamey – Joe Public – 2007
- Shane Mattis – Ma Pau, St. Ann's Rangers, Central FC, San Juan Jabloteh – 2008–14
- Kimarley McDonald – North East Stars – 2010–11
- Adrian Mitchell – Joe Public – 2006
- Akeno Morgan – North East Stars, Ma Pau, Tobago United – 2006, 2008–09
- Roen Nelson – Joe Public – 2006–08
- Lovel Palmer – W Connection – 2004
- Toric Robinson – Central FC – 2013–14
- Tyrone Sawyers – Joe Public – 2006
- Robert Scarlett – W Connection – 2004
- Keithy Simpson – North East Stars – 2012–14
- Carlington Smith – Joe Public – 2006
- Donovan Thomas – Joe Public, Morvant Caledonia United – 1999–2000
- O'Neil Thompson – W Connection – 2004
- Denzil Watson – Joe Public – 2005
- Wolry Wolfe – Joe Public – 2006, 2008

== Italy ==
- Mirko D'Elia - W Connection F.C. - 2013-14

== Japan ==
- Yu Hoshide – Joe Public – 2009–11

== Liberia ==
- Borfor Carr - Central

== Nigeria ==
- Abdullahi Aminu – Tobago United – 2005, 2007
- Aminu Erilme – Tobago United – 2005
- Chukuldi Odita – Joe Public – 1999
- Christian Okonkwo – North East Stars – 2007
- Samsideen Olutunji Quadri – Tobago United – 2005, 2007
- Eugene Onuorah – Joe Public – 1999
- Iyaka Okechekwu Stanley – W Connection, South Starworld Strikers – 2005–06

== Panama ==
- Paolo De La Guardia - W Connection F.C. - 2016

== Puerto Rico ==
- Andrés Cabrero – North East Stars – 2013–14

== Saint Kitts and Nevis ==
- **Julani Archibald** – **W Connection** – 2013–
- Seretse Cannonier – San Juan Jabloteh – 2000
- **Devaughn Elliott** – **W Connection** – 2013–
- **Ordell Flemming** – **Morvant Caledonia United** – 2015–
- Keith Gumbs – San Juan Jabloteh – 2000–01
- Floyd Hodge – Tobago United – 2003–05
- Mudassa Howe – San Juan Jabloteh – 2013–14
- George Isaac – Morvant Caledonia United, W Connection – 2000, 2003–07
- **Kennedy Isles** – **Morvant Caledonia United** – 2015–
- Ian Lake – Tobago United – 2003–05
- Allister Warner – Tobago United – 2003–05
- **Gerard Williams** – **W Connection** – 2008–

== Saint Lucia ==
- Vernus Abbott – Morvant Caledonia United – 2005, 2008
- Titus Elva – W Connection, Morvant Caledonia United – 1999–2005
- Jean-Marie Emerson – Morvant Caledonia United – 2000
- Sheldon Emmanuel – Morvant Caledonia United – 2004–09, 2011–12
- **Kurt Frederick** – **W Connection** – 2012–
- Shervon Jack – Joe Public – 2008
- Earl Jean – W Connection, San Juan Jabloteh – 1999–2008
- Elijah Joseph – W Connection – 1999–2013
- Valencius Joseph – W Connection, Morvant Caledonia United – 2000, 2004–05
- Francis Lastic – W Connection – 1999–2002
- **Otev Lawrence** – **Morvant Caledonia United** – 2015–
- Emerson Sheldon Mark – W Connection – 1999–2002
- Anthony Maximin – W Connection – 1999
- Jonathan McVane – W Connection – 1999–2002
- **Tremain Paul** – **W Connection** – 2012–
- **Zaine Pierre** – **W Connection** – 2010–11, 2015–
- **Gregory President** – **Morvant Caledonia United** – 2015–
- **Malik St. Prix** – **W Connection** – 2015–
- Benner Walter – W Connection – 2002
- Pernal Williams – W Connection – 2010–11
- Alvin Xavier – W Connection – 1999–2002

== Saint Vincent and the Grenadines ==
- James Chewitt – San Juan Jabloteh – 1999
- Keith James – Tobago United – 2009
- Troy Jeffers – St. Ann's Rangers – 2008
- Winslow McDowald – North East Stars – 2010–11
- Reginald Payne – Tobago United – 2009
- Durwin Ross – Tobago United – 2009
- Shandel Samuel – North East Stars, San Juan Jabloteh, Ma Pau – 2006–11
- Dwayne Sandy – Morvant Caledonia United – 2008–09
- Nical Stephens – Morvant Caledonia United – 2012–14
- Cornelius Stewart – Morvant Caledonia United – 2012–13
- Shemol Trimmingham – Morvant Caledonia United – 2012–13
- Kendall Velox – Joe Public, Morvant Caledonia United, North East Stars – 1999–2009, 2011–12

== Scotland ==
- James Baird – Tobago United – 2007

== Sierra Leone ==
- Alusine Bangura – W Connection – 2009
- Abdulai Conteh – W Connection – 1999
- Charlie Wright – W Connection – 1999

== South Africa ==
- Hugh Laresevree – W Connection, Joe Public – 2001–02

== South Sudan ==
- Ladulé Lako LoSarah – Central FC – 2012–13

== Suriname ==
- Ronny Aloema – Tobago United – 2009
- **Dimitrie Apai** – **W Connection** – 2013–
- Stefano Rijssel–W Connection– 2012–2014
- Lorenzo Wiebers – Tobago United – 2007–09

== United States ==
- Carlos Diaz – W Connection – 2009
- Grant Guthrie – United Petrotrin – 2008
- Steven Loverso – Tobago United – 2008
- Ralph Lundy III – Morvant Caledonia United – 2013–14
- Graham Smith - 2017
- Kenny Adeshigbin - Point Fortin Civic F.C. - 2016-17

== Venezuela ==
- Alvis Faure Díaz – Arima Fire – 2002–05

== See also ==
- List of foreign TT Pro League goalscorers
- List of TT Pro League players with international caps
