= List of TT Pro League players with international caps =

This is a list of players with international caps in the TT Pro League that began league play in 1999. The following players must have received at least one full international cap by their respective national team's first squad while playing in the TT Pro League. However, players who earned their first international cap after leaving the Pro League are not included. Appearances and goals are composed of FIFA World Cup and CONCACAF Gold Cup matches and each competition's required qualification matches, as well as numerous international friendly tournaments and matches.

The first TT Pro League players to have received a full international cap were Clayton Ince of Defence Force, Hector Sam of San Juan Jabloteh, Derek King of W Connection, and Joe Public's Lyndon Andrews, Shurland David, Arnold Dwarika, Kerwin Jemmott, Sherwyn Julien, and Stokely Mason, who represented Trinidad and Tobago in a 2–0 win against South Africa at the National Stadium on 6 May 1999. Densill Theobald is the Pro League's most capped player, appearing in 91 games for Trinidad and Tobago during his playing career in the Pro League. Nigel Pierre is the top international goal scorer while playing in the Pro League, netting 20 goals for the Soca Warriors.

There have been twelve TT Pro League international players who have represented their respective national team in the FIFA World Cup. However, the first international players to appear at the FIFA World Cup while playing in the Pro League were Cyd Gray and Aurtis Whitley. The San Juan Jabloteh duo represented Trinidad and Tobago in a 0–0 draw against Sweden in the Soca Warriors' opening match at the 2006 FIFA World Cup.

International call-ups during the earliest years of the TT Pro League were generally for Trinidad and Tobago, however, players representing the surrounding Caribbean nations of Guyana, Saint Lucia, and Saint Vincent and the Grenadines also received full international caps. From the 2000s onward, the increasingly multinational nature of the Pro League resulted in call-ups for players from across North and Central America, and around the Caribbean (including Antigua and Barbuda, Jamaica, and Saint Kitts and Nevis) and also from Africa (Botswana).

== List of international players ==
Years in TT Pro League listed are those for which the player has played at least one Pro League game and seasons for those in which the player has played at least one Pro League game. Note that seasons, not calendar years, are used. For example, "2010–13" indicates that the player has played in every season from 2010–11 to 2012–13, but not necessarily every calendar year from 2010 to 2013. Therefore, a player beginning with the 2010–11 season should always have a listing under at least two years — for instance, a player making his debut in 2011, during the 2011–12 season, will have "2011–12" in the Years in TT Pro League.

Key
Caps	Number of caps for national team while a TT Pro League player
Goals	Number of goals for national team while a TT Pro League player
†	Player represented their country at the FIFA World Cup

=== Current TT Pro League players ===
On this table is a list of TT Pro League international players who have played at least one Pro League game in the current season (2013–14), and the clubs they've played for. The list includes players who have subsequently left the club, but do not include current players of a Pro League club who have not played a Pro League game in the current season.

Details correct as of end of 2013–14 season. Next update will remove all international players from withdrawn teams and that have left their clubs from current status, and add newly admitted teams' international players that have received at least one full international cap while in the Pro League. This will be undertaken on the first day of the 2014–15 season in September 2014.

Player	National team	Caps	Goals	Years in TT Pro League	Current club	Ref(s)
Dimitrie Apai	Suriname	1	0	2013–	W Connection	
Hashim Arcia	Trinidad and Tobago	3	0	2008–	W Connection	
Kerry Baptiste	Trinidad and Tobago	50	12	2000–	San Juan Jabloteh	
Matthew Bartholomew	Trinidad and Tobago	2	0	2005–06, 2009–	Point Fortin Civic	
Bevon Bass	Trinidad and Tobago	1	0	2008–	Point Fortin Civic	
Trevin Caesar	Trinidad and Tobago	2	0	2009–	North East Stars	
Juma Clarence	Trinidad and Tobago	1	0	2008–09, 2011–12, 2013–	W Connection	
Kevaughn Connell	Trinidad and Tobago	1	0	2003–06, 2009–	Morvant Caledonia United	
Keron Cummings	Trinidad and Tobago	3	0	2010–	North East Stars	
Stephan David	Trinidad and Tobago	8	0	2001, 2006–	Morvant Caledonia United	
Lyndon Diaz	Trinidad and Tobago	2	0	2002–09, 2013–	Point Fortin Civic	
Aklie Edwards	Trinidad and Tobago	29	1	2006–	Defence Force	
Keyon Edwards	Trinidad and Tobago	10	0	2008–	Morvant Caledonia United	
Rodell Elcock	Trinidad and Tobago	2	0	2010–	Defence Force	
Kurt Frederick	Saint Lucia	12	2	2012–	W Connection	
Curtis Gonzalez	Trinidad and Tobago	13	0	2010–	Defence Force	
Kevin Graham	Trinidad and Tobago	2	0	2003–04, 2006–	Defence Force	
Ataullah Guerra	Trinidad and Tobago	21	3	2007–	Central FC	
Akiel Guevara	Trinidad and Tobago	3	0	2007–	North East Stars	
Carey Harris	Guyana	22	1	2004–	Central FC	
Jamal Jack	Trinidad and Tobago	1	0	2008–	Central FC	
Cleon John	Trinidad and Tobago	2	0	2007–	North East Stars	
Elton John	Trinidad and Tobago	1	0	2006–	Central FC	
Joevin Jones	Trinidad and Tobago	35	0	2009–	W Connection	
Devorn Jorsling	Trinidad and Tobago	38	17	2000–	Defence Force	
Marcus Joseph	Trinidad and Tobago	4	0	2007–12, 2013–	Point Fortin Civic	
Clyde Leon	Trinidad and Tobago	46	1	2001–	W Connection	
Shemel Louison	Grenada	2	0	2012–	Morvant Caledonia United	
Jason Marcano	Trinidad and Tobago	11	0	2006–	Central FC	
Yohance Marshall	Trinidad and Tobago	2	0	2013–	Central FC	
Darren Mitchell	Trinidad and Tobago	2	0	2012–	Central FC	
Trent Noel	Trinidad and Tobago	36	0	1999–	Police	
Marvin Oliver	Trinidad and Tobago	2	0	2006–	Central FC	
Andrei Pacheco	Trinidad and Tobago	8	0	2002–	Point Fortin Civic	
Tremain Paul	Saint Lucia	1	0	2012–	W Connection	
Marvin Phillip	Trinidad and Tobago	43	0	2002–	Point Fortin Civic	
Willis Plaza	Trinidad and Tobago	4	1	2010–12, 2013–	Central FC	
Stefano Rijssel	Suriname	5	4	2012–	W Connection	
Corey Rivers	Trinidad and Tobago	2	0	2002–	Defence Force	
Jean-Luc Rochford	Trinidad and Tobago	1	0	2010–11, 2012–	San Juan Jabloteh	
Richard Roy	Trinidad and Tobago	9	2	2007–	Defence Force	
Leslie Joel Russell	Trinidad and Tobago	1	0	2010–11	W Connection	
Hector Sam	Trinidad and Tobago	9	0	1999–2000, 2009–	Central FC	
Jemel Sebro	Trinidad and Tobago	1	0	2010–	Defence Force	
Conrad Smith	Trinidad and Tobago	17	4	2001–	Morvant Caledonia United	
Kareem Smith (Note: Born in the United States)	Trinidad and Tobago	6	0	2008–09, 2013–	Morvant Caledonia United	
Silvio Spann	Trinidad and Tobago	18	2	2000–04, 2006–07, 2010–	W Connection	
Nical Stephens	Saint Vincent and the Grenadines	2	0	2012–	Morvant Caledonia United	
Densill Theobald	Trinidad and Tobago^{†} (Note: Represented Trinidad and Tobago at the 2006 FIFA World Cup in Germany)	91	2	2002–	Morvant Caledonia United	
Nickolson Thomas	Trinidad and Tobago	5	0	2004–	Point Fortin Civic	
Andre Toussaint	Trinidad and Tobago	29	6	1999–	Point Fortin Civic	
Julian Wade	Dominica	3	2	2013–	Morvant Caledonia United	
Gerard Williams	Saint Kitts and Nevis	22	2	2008–	W Connection	
Jan-Michael Williams	Trinidad and Tobago	52	0	2003–07, 2009–	Central FC	
Keston Williams	Trinidad and Tobago	11	0	2007–	Defence Force	
Mekeil Williams	Trinidad and Tobago	1	1	2009, 2011–	W Connection	
Rundell Winchester	Trinidad and Tobago	4	0	2012–	Central FC	
Glenton Wolfe	Trinidad and Tobago	5	0	2001–	North East Stars	
Kareem Young	Trinidad and Tobago	2	0	2010–11, 2012–	Police	

=== Former TT Pro League players ===
On this table is a list of former TT Pro League players who have been capped by their respective national team while playing in the Pro League. The list includes current international players that have either subsequently left the Pro League or have not played at least one Pro League game in the current season (2013–14).

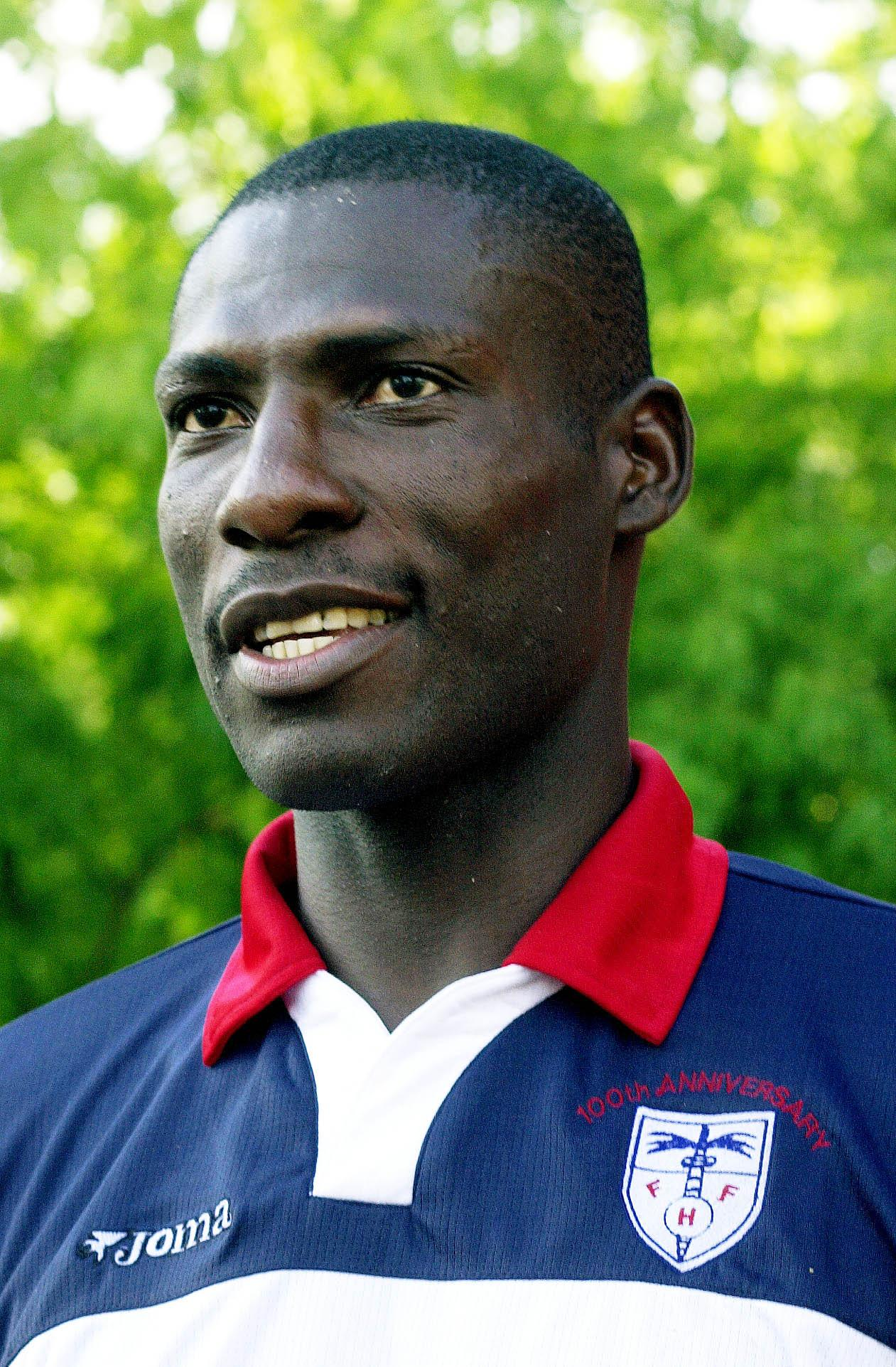
Pierre Richard Bruny is the all-time leading capped player with 87 appearances for Haiti; nine of which as a Pro League player

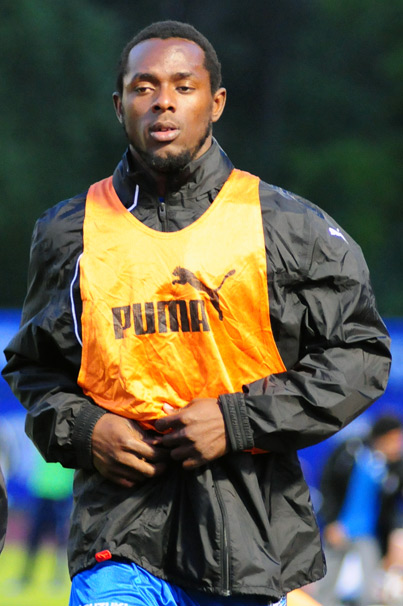
Peter Byers is the most recent foreign player to win the Golden Boot in 2007 with San Juan Jabloteh with 15 goals

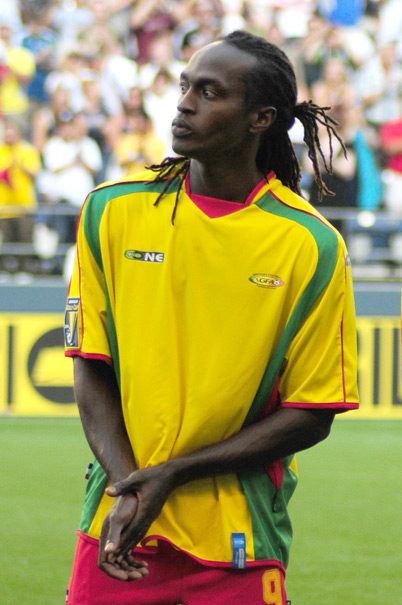
Ricky Charles played for St. Ann's Rangers in 2008 and leads his native Grenada with 20 goals

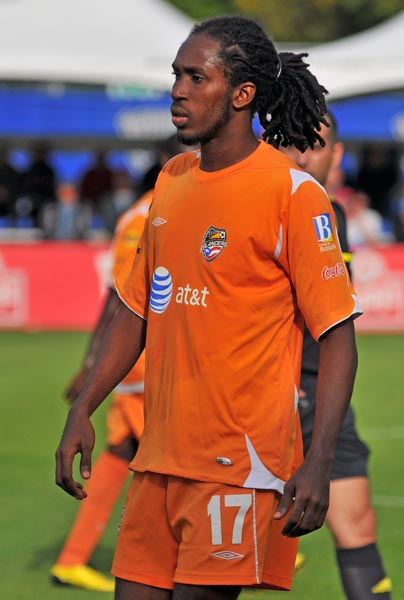
Keon Daniel earned 37 caps and scored 8 goals before making a move to the Puerto Rico Islanders in 2010

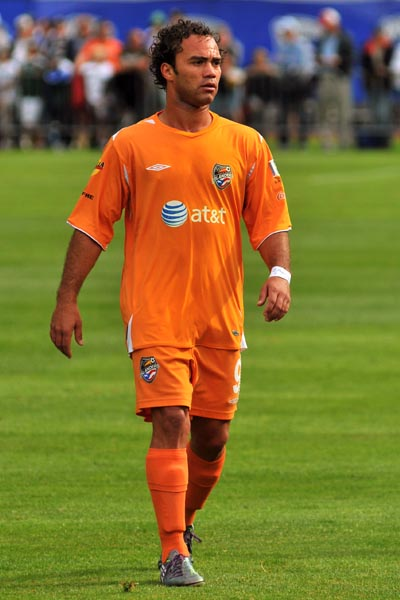
Jonathan Faña is the all-time leading goal scorer for the Dominican Republic with 16 goals

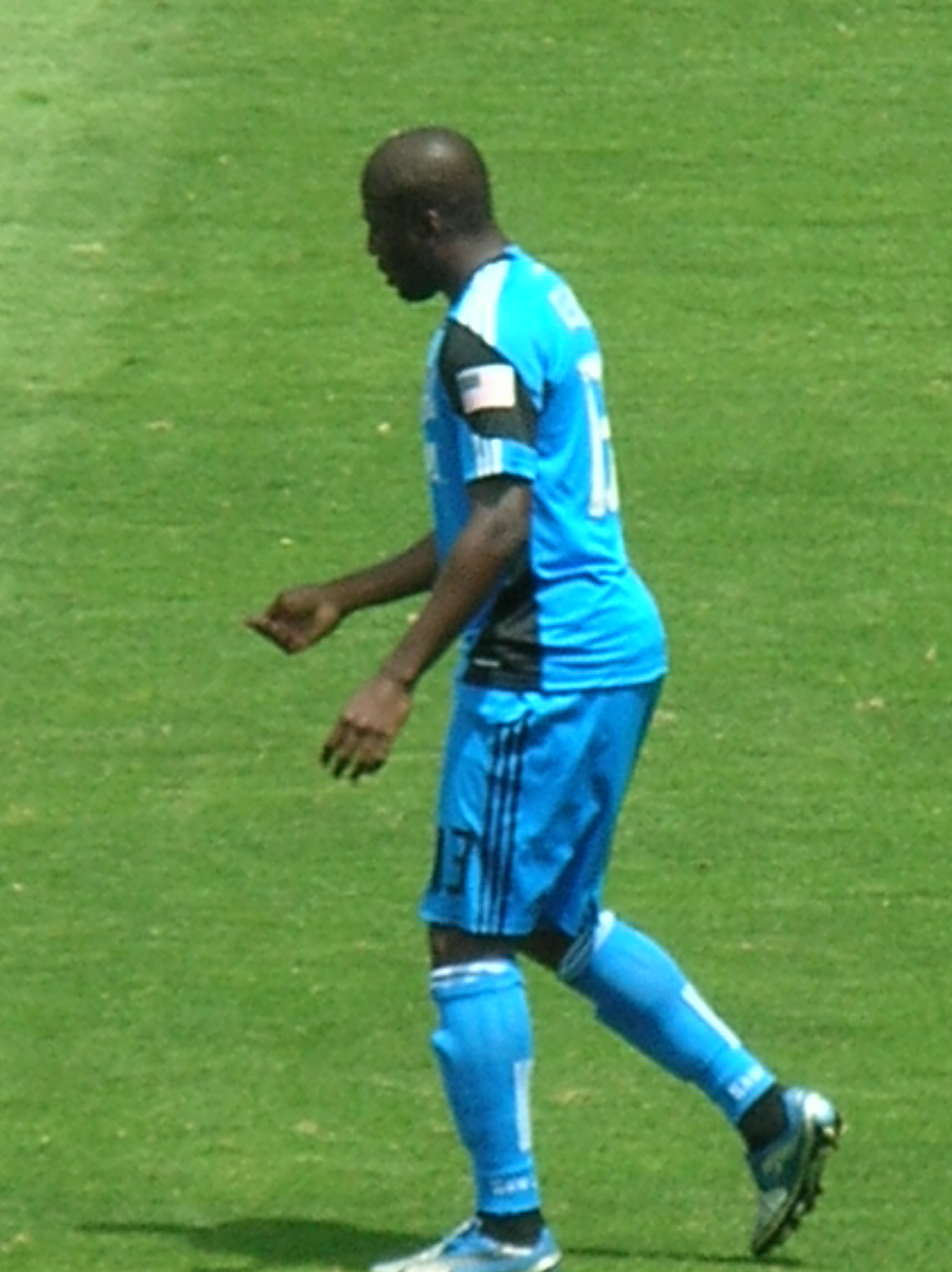
Cornell Glen has 30 caps and 13 goals for Trinidad and Tobago as a TT Pro League player

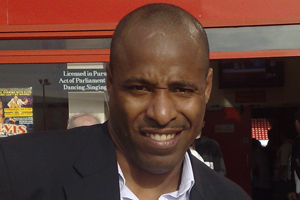
Clayton Ince represented Trinidad and Tobago five times while playing for Defence Force before spending most of his career in England

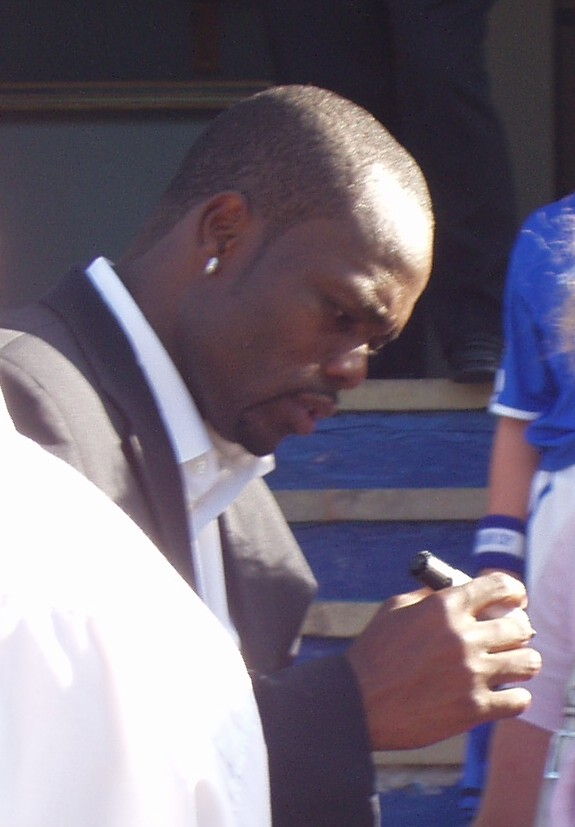
Stern John represented the Soca Warriors at the 2006 FIFA World Cup and is their all-time leading scorer with 70 goals

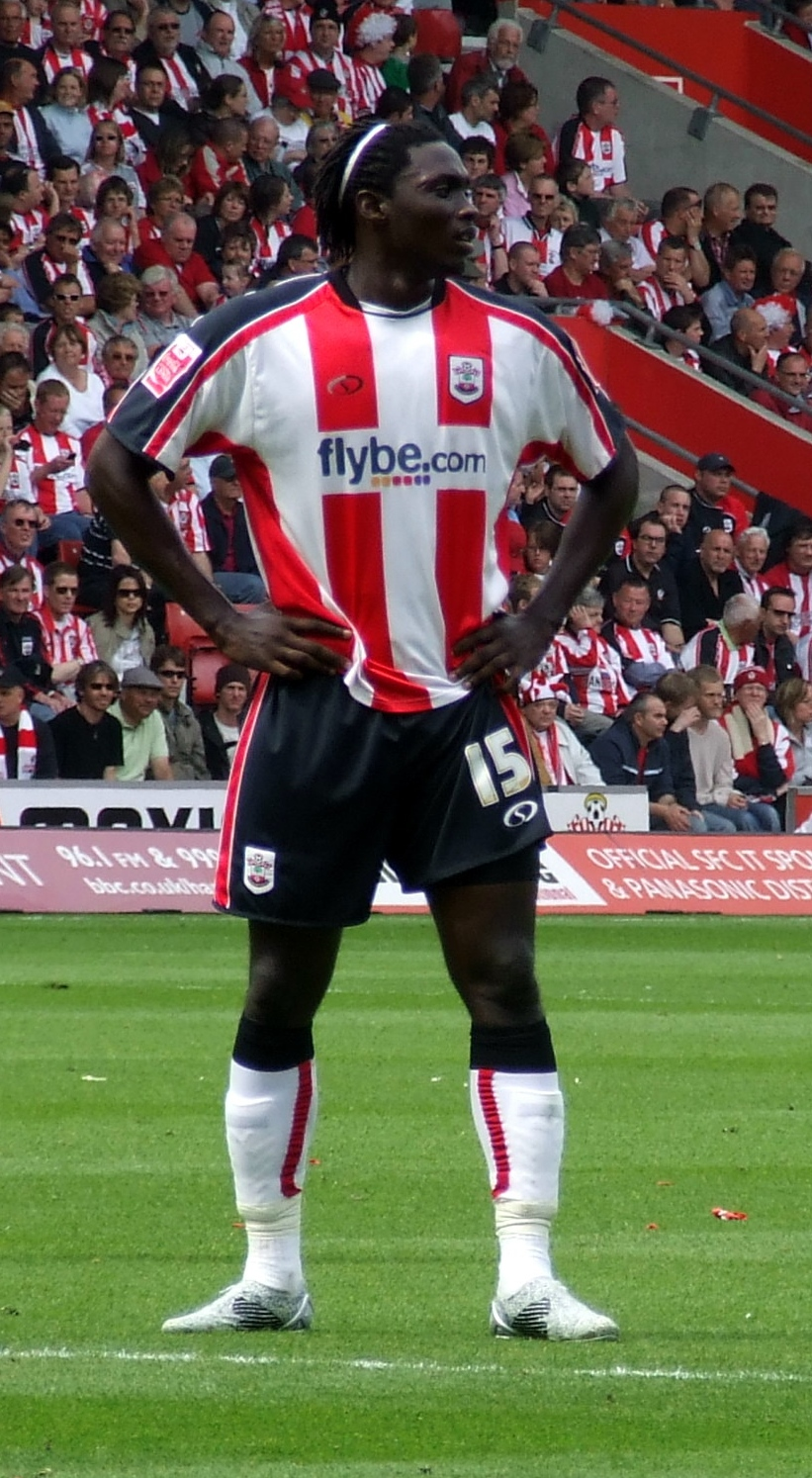
Kenwyne Jones appeared six times for Trinidad and Tobago while at Joe Public and W Connection from 2002 to 2004

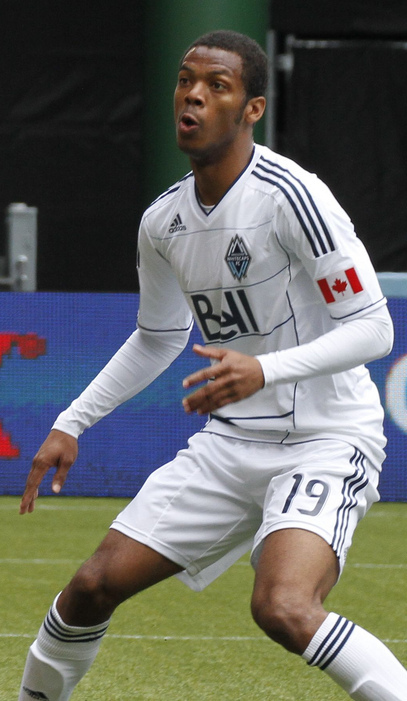
After earning just three caps while at Joe Public, Carlyle Mitchell made a transfer to the Vancouver Whitecaps FC in 2011

Kevin Molino appeared in four matches for the Soca Warriors while in the Pro League before heading to Orlando City

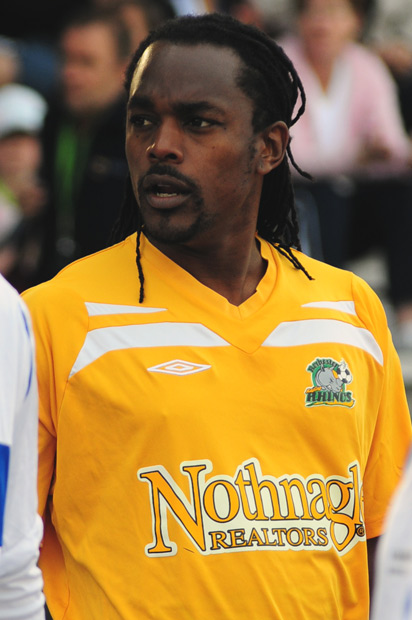
Brent Sancho had nine caps for Trinidad and Tobago while on loan at San Juan Jabloteh during the 2002 and 2003 seasons

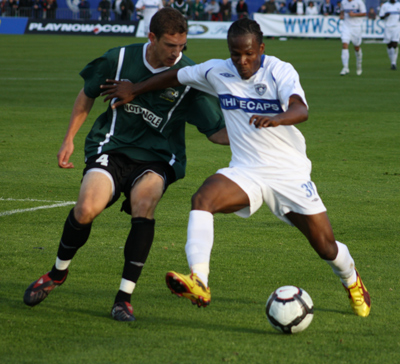
Cornelius Stewart scored six goals for Saint Vincent and the Grendadines during his short stint as a Morvant Caledonia United player

Player	National team	Caps	Goals	Years in TT Pro League	Ref(s)
Vernus Abbott	Saint Lucia	4	0	2005, 2008	
Anthony Abrams	Guyana	12	4	2006–07	
Radanfah Abu Bakr	Trinidad and Tobago	5	1	2007–11, 2012–13	
Akeem Adams	Trinidad and Tobago	9	0	2008–13	
Claude Adams	Trinidad and Tobago	1	0	2000–06	
Romauld Aguillera	Trinidad and Tobago	6	0	2003–13	
Ronny Aloema	Suriname	1	0	2009	
Lyndon Andrews	Trinidad and Tobago	18	1	1999–2000, 2002–11	
Melvin Andrews	Saint Vincent and the Grenadines	11	0	2005–06	
Odelle Armstrong	Trinidad and Tobago	2	0	2002–13	
Brion Baker	Guyana	4	0	2008–09	
Christon Baptiste	Trinidad and Tobago	8	1	2004–13	
Addison Belfon	Trinidad and Tobago	8	0	1999–2006	
Shawn Beveney	Guyana	19	4	2006, 2010–11	
Shawn Bishop	Guyana	2	0	2005, 2007	
Trayon Bobb	Guyana	19	2	2010–13	
Pierre Richard Bruny	Haiti	9	0	2001–02	
Peter Byers	Antigua and Barbuda	10	8	2007–08, 2012–13	
Reynold Carrington	Trinidad and Tobago	30	2	1999–2002	
Kevon Carter	Trinidad and Tobago	31	5	2003–14	
Devon Caseman	Trinidad and Tobago	2	0	2002–04, 2006–09	
Marlon Cayonne	Trinidad and Tobago	2	0	2000–01	
Michael Celestine	Trinidad and Tobago	7	1	2000–07	
David Atiba Charles	Trinidad and Tobago	23	0	1999–2008, 2011–12	
Hutson Charles	Trinidad and Tobago	1	0	1999–2000	
Ricky Charles	Grenada	14	8	2008	
Tristan Charles	Trinidad and Tobago	1	0	2008	
Ranjae Christian	Antigua and Barbuda	4	0	2000	
Kevon Clement	Trinidad and Tobago	2	0	2002–06	
Nigel Codrington	Guyana	20	15	2005–09	
Daneil Cyrus	Trinidad and Tobago	32	0	2010–11, 2012–14	
Kern Cupid	Trinidad and Tobago	25	0	2005–12	
Keon Daniel	Trinidad and Tobago	37	8	2006–09	
Nigel Daniel	Trinidad and Tobago	27	1	2001–12	
Aubrey David (Note: Born in Guyana) (Note: Aubrey David received two caps for Guyana in 2012 before making a one-time international switch to Trinidad and Tobago)	Guyana	2	0	2009–14	
Aubrey David	Trinidad and Tobago	16	1	2009–14	
Shurland David	Trinidad and Tobago	28	0	1999–2000, 2003–05	
Kendall Davis	Trinidad and Tobago	1	0	2002–09	
George Dublin	Antigua and Barbuda	26	2	2002–08	
Andrew Durant	Guyana	1	0	2007–08, 2011–12	
Arnold Dwarika	Trinidad and Tobago	49	17	1999–2003, 2005–10	
Carlos Edwards	Trinidad and Tobago^{†}	10	0	1999–2000	
Michael Edwards	Trinidad and Tobago	1	0	2008–13	
Ancil Elcock	Trinidad and Tobago	7	0	2002–06	
Titus Elva	Saint Lucia	13	5	1999–2005	
Sheldon Emmanuel	Saint Lucia	11	2	2004–09, 2011–12	
Angus Eve	Trinidad and Tobago	64	13	2000–05	
Jonathan Faña	Dominican Republic	6	5	2006–09	
Kerlon Ferguson	Trinidad and Tobago	1	0	2011–	
Jerol Forbes	Trinidad and Tobago	5	1	2004–12	
Peter Ramon Fortune	Trinidad and Tobago	1	0	2002–05	
Mogogi Gabonamong	Botswana	14	2	2004–05	
Jamal Gay	Trinidad and Tobago	14	6	2008, 2011–14	
Selwyn George	Trinidad and Tobago	4	0	2000–08	
Gary Glasgow	Trinidad and Tobago	13	6	2005–12	
Cornell Glen	Trinidad and Tobago^{†}	30	13	1999–2000, 2002–04, 2007–08, 2011–13	
Cyd Gray	Trinidad and Tobago^{†}	59	1	1999–2011	
Ian Gray	Trinidad and Tobago	4	0	2002–09	
Gayson Gregory	Antigua and Barbuda	31	5	2001–03, 2006, 2008, 2010–11	
Keith Gumbs	Saint Kitts and Nevis	7	5	2000–01	
Hughton Hector	Trinidad and Tobago	25	7	2008–12	
Collie Hercules	Guyana	12	0	1999–2000, 2007–09	
Makan Hislop	Trinidad and Tobago	30	0	2008–11	
Floyd Hodge	Saint Kitts and Nevis	10	2	2003–05	
Sheldon Holder	Guyana	10	0	2011–13	
Leslie Holligan	Guyana	12	0	2006–07	
Jermaine Hue	Jamaica	7	7	2004	
Khaleem Hyland	Trinidad and Tobago	25	2	2007–08	
Clayton Ince	Trinidad and Tobago	5	0	1999, 2010–12	
George Isaac	Saint Kitts and Nevis	23	11	2000, 2003–07	
Dwayne Jack	Trinidad and Tobago	12	1	2004–09	
Kelvin Jack	Trinidad and Tobago^{†}	10	0	2000–03	
Kester Jacobs	Guyana	5	0	2008–09	
Kendall Jagdeosingh	Trinidad and Tobago	2	0	2004–07	
Devon Jamerson	Trinidad and Tobago	2	0	2009–12	
Brian James	Trinidad and Tobago	2	0	1999–2006	
Rolston James	Trinidad and Tobago	2	0	1999–2002	
Earl Jean	Saint Lucia	11	3	1999–2008	
Troy Jeffers	Saint Vincent and the Grenadines	5	0	2008	
Kerwyn Jemmot	Trinidad and Tobago	31	2	1999–12	
Randolph Jerome	Guyana	17	7	1999–2011	
Stern John	Trinidad and Tobago^{†}	5	1	2011–12	
Teran John	Saint Lucia	2	0	2011–12	
Josh Johnson	Trinidad and Tobago	4	0	1999–2006	
Quacy Johnson	Guyana	1	0	2007–08	
Kenwyne Jones	Trinidad and Tobago^{†}	6	0	2002–04	
Elijah Joseph	Saint Lucia	15	2	1999–2013	
Valencius Joseph	Saint Lucia	3	0	2000, 2004–05	
Gyasi Joyce	Trinidad and Tobago	4	0	2008–09	
Sean Julien	Trinidad and Tobago	1	0	2002–04	
Sherwyn Julien	Trinidad and Tobago	12	0	1999–2000	
Keith Kelly	Jamaica	4	0	2005	
Derek King	Trinidad and Tobago	33	1	1999–2007	
Ian Lake	Saint Kitts and Nevis	10	8	2003–05	
Francis Lastic	Saint Lucia	3	1	1999–2002	
Dennis Lawrence	Trinidad and Tobago^{†}	18	0	1999–2000, 2009	
Ashford Leggerton	Trinidad and Tobago	1	0	2002–03, 2005–06	
Mark Leslie	Belize	2	0	2004, 2006, 2008–11	
Bevon Lewis	Trinidad and Tobago	1	0	2003–13	
Dean Logan	Trinidad and Tobago	1	0	2002	
Howard Lowe	Guyana	27	1	2004–08	
Konata Mannings	Guyana	9	1	2008	
Handel Manswell	Trinidad and Tobago	1	0	2002–06	
Emerson Sheldon Mark	Saint Lucia	3	0	1999–2002	
Stokely Mason	Trinidad and Tobago	50	5	1999–2009	
Owen Matthews	Trinidad and Tobago	1	0	2000–03	
Terrence McAllister	Trinidad and Tobago	1	0	2002–08	
Michael McComie	Trinidad and Tobago	4	0	1999–2004	
Winslow McDowald	Saint Vincent and the Grenadines	1	0	2010–11	
Errol McFarlane	Trinidad and Tobago	5	1	1999, 2002, 2006–07, 2009–12	
Garvin McKenna	Trinidad and Tobago	1	0	2003–04, 2007–08	
Kelvin McKenzie	Guyana	2	0	2005, 2007–08	
Kayode McKinnon	Guyana	37	2	2002–11	
Jonathan McVane	Saint Lucia	3	1	1999–2002	
Gabriel Michel	Haiti	5	0	2001	
Vurlon Mills	Guyana	17	6	2011–13	
Carlyle Mitchell	Trinidad and Tobago	3	0	2008–11	
Devon Mitchell	Trinidad and Tobago	3	0	2002–08	
Kevin Molino	Trinidad and Tobago	4	0	2008–11	
Walter Moore	Guyana	55	4	2005–13	
Kareem Moses	Trinidad and Tobago	7	0	2010–14	
Travis Mulraine	Trinidad and Tobago	12	0	1999, 2002–13	
David Nakhid	Trinidad and Tobago	4	0	2005	
Adrian Narine	Trinidad and Tobago	5	0	2000–03, 2009–12	
Kevon Neaves	Trinidad and Tobago	1	0	2010–12	
Colin Nelson	Guyana	14	1	2010–13	
Jerren Nixon	Trinidad and Tobago	5	1	2003–05	
Kerry Noray	Trinidad and Tobago	8	1	2001–11	
Anthony Noreiga	Trinidad and Tobago	7	0	2002, 2007–13	
Trevor Nottingham	Trinidad and Tobago	1	0	1999, 2002–05	
Adrian Nuñez	Trinidad and Tobago	1	0	2003–05, 2007–08	
Lester Peltier	Trinidad and Tobago	9	1	2006–11	
Sherman Phillips	Trinidad and Tobago	6	1	2000–08	
Anton Pierre	Trinidad and Tobago	50	1	1999–2011	
Marlon Pierre	Trinidad and Tobago	2	0	2001–03	
Nigel Pierre	Trinidad and Tobago	49	20	1999–2007, 2009	
Zaine Pierre	Saint Lucia	5	1	2010–11	
Charles Pollard	Guyana	50	3	2000–13	
Seon Power	Trinidad and Tobago	40	2	2003–13	
Robert Primus	Trinidad and Tobago	3	0	2008–11	
Brent Rahim	Trinidad and Tobago	15	3	2001, 2006	
Shane Rennie	Grenada	15	5	2008	
Wendell Rennie	Grenada	1	0	2010–11	
Richard Reynolds	Guyana	14	0	2004, 2007–09	
Gregory Richardson	Guyana	10	3	2007–08	
Colin Roberts	Trinidad and Tobago	2	0	1999–2002	
Marlon Rojas	Trinidad and Tobago	12	0	2003–04	
Ross Russell	Trinidad and Tobago	10	0	1999–2001	
Collin Samuel	Trinidad and Tobago^{†}	6	2	1999–2002	
Shandel Samuel	Saint Vincent and the Grenadines	25	16	2006–11	
Brent Sancho	Trinidad and Tobago^{†}	11	0	2000, 2002–03, 2008, 2010	
Dale Saunders	Trinidad and Tobago	36	2	1999–2009	
Robert Scarlett	Jamaica	5	2	2004	
Jason Scotland	Trinidad and Tobago	10	3	1999–2002	
Jose Luiz Seabra (Note: Born in Brazil)	Trinidad and Tobago	6	0	1999–2008	
Kelvin Smith	Guyana	4	0	2009–13	
Kwesi Smith	Trinidad and Tobago	4	0	2000–08	
Silas Spann	Trinidad and Tobago	2	0	2004–08	
Jason Springer	Trinidad and Tobago	1	0	2008	
Cornelius Stewart	Saint Vincent and the Grenadines	8	6	2012–13	
Ryan Stewart	Trinidad and Tobago	2	0	2003–04, 2010–12	
Uz Taylor	Trinidad and Tobago	2	0	2002–11	
Keyeno Thomas	Trinidad and Tobago	66	2	1999, 2001–09	
Hayden Tinto	Trinidad and Tobago	23	1	2006–13	
Kagiso Tshelametsi	Botswana	9	0	2004–05	
Shemol Trimmingham	Saint Vincent and the Grenadines	2	0	2012–13	
Mickey Trotman	Trinidad and Tobago	9	2	2000	
Kendall Velox	Saint Vincent and the Grenadines	37	7	1999–2009, 2011–12	
Aurtis Whitley	Trinidad and Tobago^{†}	41	2	1999–2010	
Lorenzo Wiebers	Suriname	6	0	2007–09	
Daurance Williams	Trinidad and Tobago	16	0	2001–09	
Kurt Williams	Trinidad and Tobago	6	0	1999–2005, 2007–12	
Pernal Williams	Saint Lucia	3	0	2010–11	
Ronson Williams	Guyana	5	0	2011–12	
Kwame Wiltshire	Trinidad and Tobago	5	0	2006–12	
Shahdon Winchester	Trinidad and Tobago	2	0	2008–14	
Evans Wise	Trinidad and Tobago^{†}	1	0	2003–05	
Anthony Wolfe	Trinidad and Tobago	32	3	2002–06, 2008–14	
Wolry Wolfe	Jamaica	6	0	2006, 2008	
Alvin Xavier	Saint Lucia	2	0	1999–2002	

=== International players by nationality ===
Rank	Country	TT Pro League players		
Rank	Country	Current	Former	Total
1	Trinidad and Tobago	50	111	161
2	Guyana	1	26	27
3	Saint Lucia	2	13	15
4	Saint Vincent and the Grenadines	1	7	8
5	Saint Kitts and Nevis	1	4	5
6	Antigua and Barbuda	0	4	4
6	Grenada	1	3	4
6	Jamaica	0	4	4
6	Suriname	2	2	4
10	Botswana	0	2	2
10	Haiti	0	2	2
12	Belize	0	1	1
12	Dominica	1	0	1
12	Dominican Republic	0	1	1
Total		59	180	239

== See also ==
- List of foreign TT Pro League players
- List of foreign TT Pro League goalscorers

== Notes ==
Players

National teams
