= List of foreign TT Pro League goalscorers =

This is a list of foreign goalscorers in the TT Pro League that began league play in 1999. The TT Pro League has been represented by 28 FIFA affiliated nations in total. At the conclusion of the 2015–16 season, 21 different foreign FIFA affiliated nations have been represented in the Pro League score list. The following players must meet both of the following two criteria:

1. Have scored at least one TT Pro League goal. Players who were signed by Pro League clubs, but only scored in lower league, cup and/or international matches, or did not score in any competitive games at all, are not included.
2. Are considered foreign, i.e., outside Trinidad and Tobago, if he is not eligible to play for the Trinidad and Tobago national team.

More specifically,

- If a player has been capped on international level, the national team is used; if he has been capped by more than one country, the highest level (or the most recent) team is used. These include Trinidad and Tobago players with dual citizenship.
- If a player has not been capped on international level, his country of birth is used, except those who were born abroad from Trinidad and Tobago parents or moved to Trinidad and Tobago at a young age, and those who clearly indicated to have switched his nationality to another nation.

Clubs listed are those for which the player has scored at least one Pro League goal. Players that have scored more than one Pro League goal have the number of goals that the player scored in the Pro League listed in parentheses.

In bold: Players who have scored at least one Pro League goal in the current season (2015–16), and the clubs they've scored at least Pro League goal for. They include players who have subsequently left the club, but do not include current players of a Pro League club who have not scored at least one Pro League goal in the current season.

Details correct as of end of 2015–16 season. Next update will remove all players that have scored at least one Pro League goal from withdrawn teams and that have left their clubs from Bold status, and add newly admitted teams' players that scored at least one Pro League goal. This will be undertaken on the first day of the 2016–17 season in September 2016.

== Antigua and Barbuda ==
- Marcus Ambrose – Morvant Caledonia United (2)
- Peter Byers – San Juan Jabloteh, Central FC (30)
- George Dublin – Joe Public
- Gayson Gregory – San Juan Jabloteh, Joe Public (9)

== Belize ==
- Mark Leslie – Ma Pau, North East Stars (4)

== Brazil ==
- Christian Almas – W Connection
- Joao Paulo Santana Bezzera – Ma Pau
- Douglas da Costa – W Connection (2)
- Célio da Silva – W Connection
- Iomar da Silva – Ma Pau (2)
- Jorge da Silva – Joe Public
- José da Silva – W Connection
- Elton de Britto – Ma Pau
- Jerónimo Wendes de Sousa – North East Stars (3)
- José Luiz de Sousa – W Connection
- Leandro dos Santos – Ma Pau
- Gefferson – W Connection (28)
- Luis Andre Lima – United Petrotrin (4)
- José Maria Manoel – W Connection (16)
- Francisco Neto – W Connection
- William Oliveira – W Connection (8)
- Renato Pereira – W Connection
- Paulo Roberto – W Connection
- Igor de Oliviera Santos – W Connection
- Luciano Sato – W Connection (9)
- Ronaldo Viana – W Connection, San Juan Jabloteh (27)
- Jose Luciano Viera – W Connection (6)

== Colombia ==
- Eder Gilmar Arias – W Connection (5)
- Rudinei Cardoso – Joe Public
- Milton Espitia – North East Stars
- Milton Gomez – W Connection, North East Stars (4)
- Carlos González – Joe Public (5)
- Phanor González – Joe Public (6)
- Camilo Ortega – W Connection
- Jerson Peñaranda – San Juan Jabloteh (2)
- Jair Saldaña – Joe Public
- Oscar Velasco – W Connection (5)
- Christian Viveros – W Connection (4)

== Dominica ==
- Julian Wade – Morvant Caledonia United (3)

== Dominican Republic ==
- Jonathan Faña – W Connection (33)

== England ==
- Luke Gullick – San Juan Jabloteh

== Grenada ==
- Ricky Charles – St. Ann's Rangers (3)
- Denron Frederick – Morvant Caledonia United (2)
- Shane Rennie – St. Ann's Rangers (3)
- Wendell Rennie – FC South End

== Guyana ==
- Anthony Abrams – Morvant Caledonia United (5)
- Shawn Beveney – Morvant Caledonia United (2)
- Shawn Bishop – Morvant Caledonia United (2)
- Trayon Bobb – Morvant Caledonia United (2)
- Nigel Codrington – San Juan Jabloteh, Morvant Caledonia United (32)
- Carey Harris – Joe Public, Tobago United, North East Stars (19)
- Collie Hercules – Doc's Khelwalaas, Tobago United (32)
- **Sheldon Holder** – **Morvant Caledonia United** (12)
- Leslie Holligan – North East Stars (2)
- Selwyn Isaacs – Tobago United
- Kester Jacobs – Morvant Caledonia United
- Randolph Jerome – Doc's Khelwalaas, South Starworld Strikers, W Connection, Morvant Caledonia United, North East Stars (112)
- Tichard Joseph – Tobago United (2)
- Howard Lowe – Joe Public, North East Stars, Morvant Caledonia United (7)
- Kayode McKinnon – Morvant Caledonia United, Joe Public, Tobago United, North East Stars (22)
- Vurlon Mills – T&TEC, Morvant Caledonia United (5)
- Walter Moore – North East Stars, Morvant Caledonia United (13)
- Dwight Peters – Morvant Caledonia United (5)
- Charles Pollard – Doc's Khelwalaas, W Connection, Morvant Caledonia United, North East Stars (13)
- Gregory Richardson – Joe Public (12)
- **Pernell Schultz** – **Morvant Caledonia United** (20)

== Jamaica ==
- Nicholas Addlery – South Starworld Strikers (2)
- Oneke Ford – North East Stars (5)
- Sean Fraser – North East Stars (2)
- Christopher Harvey – W Connection, Joe Public (6)
- Jermaine Hue – W Connection (2)
- Akeno Morgan – North East Stars
- Roen Nelson – Joe Public (33)
- Robert Scarlett – W Connection (3)
- Keithy Simpson – North East Stars (3)
- Wolry Wolfe – Joe Public (7)

== Japan ==
- Yu Hoshide – Joe Public (2)

== Nigeria ==
- Christian Okonkwo – North East Stars (2)
- Iyaka Okechekwu Stanley – W Connection, South Starworld Strikers (3)

== Peru ==
- Cesar Soler – San Juan Jabloteh(2)

== Saint Kitts and Nevis ==
- Seretse Cannonier – San Juan Jabloteh
- Devaughn Elliott – W Connection
- Keith Gumbs – San Juan Jabloteh (22)
- George Isaac – Morvant Caledonia United, W Connection (25)
- Gerard Williams – W Connection (4)

== Saint Lucia ==
- Titus Elva – W Connection, Morvant Caledonia United (35)
- Jean-Marie Emerson – Morvant Caledonia United (2)
- Sheldon Emmanuel – Morvant Caledonia United (3)
- **Kurt Frederick** – **W Connection** (7)
- Earl Jean – W Connection, San Juan Jabloteh (90)
- Elijah Joseph – W Connection (2)
- Valencius Joseph – W Connection, Morvant Caledonia United (14)
- Francis Lastic – W Connection (14)
- Emerson Sheldon Mark – W Connection (3)
- **Malik St. Prix** – **W Connection** (2)
- Benner Walter – W Connection (5)
- Alvin Xavier – W Connection

== Saint Vincent and the Grenadines ==
- James Chewitt – San Juan Jabloteh
- Reginald Payne – Tobago United (5)
- Shandel Samuel – North East Stars, San Juan Jabloteh, Ma Pau (16)
- Cornelius Stewart – Morvant Caledonia United
- Kendall Velox – Joe Public, Morvant Caledonia United, North East Stars (43)

== Sierra Leone ==
- Alusine Bangura – W Connection (3)

== South Africa ==
- Hugh Laresevree – Joe Public (2)

== Suriname ==
- Ronny Aloema – Tobago United
- **Dimitrie Apai** – **W Connection** (13)
- Stefano Rijssel–W Connection (9)

== United States ==
- Carlos Diaz – W Connection (2)
- Ralph Lundy III – Morvant Caledonia United (2)

== Venezuela ==
- Alvis Faure Díaz – Arima Fire (11)

== See also ==
- List of foreign TT Pro League players
- List of TT Pro League players with international caps
