= List of Trinidadian football transfers 2009 =

Trinidadian football transfers

This is a list of Trinidadian football transfers during the 2009 season. Only moves featuring at least one TT Pro League club are listed. Transfers that were made following the conclusion of the 2008 season on 29 November 2008 and during the 2009 season, which ran until 27 October 2009, are listed.

Players without a club cannot join one at any time, either during or in between transfer windows. Clubs within or outside the Pro League may sign players on loan at any time. If need be, clubs may sign a goalkeeper on an emergency loan, if all others are unavailable.

== Transfers ==
All players and clubs without with a flag are from Trinidad and Tobago. In addition, transfers involving Major League Soccer clubs in the United States and Canada technically have the league as the second party and not the listed club. MLS player contracts are owned by the league and not by individual clubs.

Date	Player	Moving from	Moving to	Fee
8 December 2008	(Guyana) Howard Lowe	Caledonia AIA	(Guyana) Alpha United FC	Undisclosed
8 December 2008	(Guyana) Sean Johnson	Tobago United	(Guyana) Alpha United FC	Loan
8 December 2008	(Guyana) Kelvin Smith	Tobago United	(Guyana) Alpha United FC	Loan
10 December 2008	(Guyana) Kevin Beaton	Caledonia AIA	(Guyana) Bakewell Topp XX	Undisclosed
10 December 2008	(Guyana) Carey Harris	Tobago United	(Guyana) Bakewell Topp XX	Loan
10 December 2008	(Guyana) Collie Hercules	Tobago United	(Guyana) Bakewell Topp XX	Loan
10 December 2008	(Guyana) Kayode McKinnon	Tobago United	(Guyana) Bakewell Topp XX	Loan
10 December 2008	(Guyana) Richard Reynolds	Tobago United	(Guyana) Bakewell Topp XX	Loan
10 December 2008	Javin Crawford	Tobago United	(Guyana) Bakewell Topp XX	Undisclosed
10 December 2008	(Guyana) Selwyn Isaacs	Tobago United	(Guyana) Bakewell Topp XX	Undisclosed
15 December 2008	(Guyana) Gregory Richardson	Joe Public	(Guyana) Pele FC	Loan
16 December 2008	(Guyana) Charles Pollard	Caledonia AIA	(Guyana) Pele FC	Loan
21 December 2008	(Guyana) Tichard Joseph	Tobago United	(Guyana) Buxton United	Loan
9 January 2009	(Dominican Republic) Miguel Lloyd	(Dominican Republic) Barcelona FC	W Connection	Free
23 January 2009	Hector Sam	Unattached	San Juan Jabloteh	Free
29 January 2009	Jamal Gay	Joe Public	(Germany) Rot-Weiß Oberhausen	Undisclosed
6 February 2009	Hayden Tinto	Caledonia AIA	Joe Public	Free
6 February 2009	Daurance Williams	San Juan Jabloteh	Joe Public	Free
6 February 2009	Michael Woods	Caledonia AIA	Joe Public	Free
12 February 2009	Micah Lewis	San Juan Jabloteh	Joe Public	Free
18 February 2009	Sean Cooper	Unattached	Tobago United	Free
18 February 2009	Julien Landeau	San Juan Jabloteh	Joe Public	Free
18 February 2009	Atiba McKnight	W Connection	Joe Public	Free
18 February 2009	Akeem Parris	United Petrotrin	Joe Public	Free
18 February 2009	John Stewart	Unattached	Joe Public	Free
20 February 2009	Cyd Gray	San Juan Jabloteh	United Petrotrin	Free
20 February 2009	Stokely Mason	Unattached	United Petrotrin	Free
20 February 2009	Nigel Pierre	Unattached	United Petrotrin	Free
20 February 2009	Aurtis Whitley	W Connection	United Petrotrin	Free
23 February 2009	Kevon Villaroel	San Juan Jabloteh	Puerto Rico Islanders	Undisclosed
27 February 2009	(Guyana) Gregory Richardson	Joe Public	(Canada) Toronto FC	Undisclosed
11 March 2009	Terrence McAllister	Joe Public	(United States) Cleveland City Stars	Undisclosed
17 March 2009	Matthew Bartholomew	(Hungary) Ferencváros	W Connection	Free
17 March 2009	Aaron Downing	(Hungary) Ferencváros	W Connection	Free
17 March 2009	Glenton Wolfe	Unattached	W Connection	Free
17 March 2009	Kevon Woodley	United Petrotrin	W Connection	Free
17 March 2009	Keryn Navarro	Unattached	W Connection	Free
23 March 2009	Keyon Edwards	St. Ann's Rangers	Caledonia AIA	Free
23 March 2009	Judah Hernandez	Unattached	Caledonia AIA	Free
23 March 2009	Kevin Mussio	San Juan Jabloteh	Caledonia AIA	Free
23 March 2009	Conrad Smith	Caledonia AIA	Joe Public	Free
30 March 2009	Trent Noel	San Juan Jabloteh	United Petrotrin	Undisclosed
14 April 2009	Errol McFarlane	(Lebanon) Al-Mabarrah	St. Ann's Rangers	Free
20 April 2009	Stephen Cruickshank	Ma Pau	(United States) Cleveland City Stars	Undisclosed
22 April 2009	Anthony Wolfe	Unattached	Ma Pau	Free
27 April 2009	Nigel Daniel	Unattached	United Petrotrin	Free
2 May 2009	Quincy Charles	Ma Pau	Joe Public	Free
2 May 2009	Akiel Guevara	Unattached	Joe Public	Free
4 May 2009	Arnold Dwarika	Joe Public	United Petrotrin	Free
4 May 2009	Gary Glasgow	Joe Public	United Petrotrin	Free
4 May 2009	Ian Gray	Unattached	United Petrotrin	Free
8 May 2009	Lyndon Andrews	Joe Public	Ma Pau	Free
8 May 2009	Kerry Noray	Joe Public	Ma Pau	Free
8 May 2009	Kevin Molino	San Juan Jabloteh	Ma Pau	Loan
8 May 2009	Mekeil Williams	San Juan Jabloteh	Ma Pau	Loan
11 May 2009	Keon Daniel	Unattached	Caledonia AIA	Free
18 May 2009	Cornell Glen	San Juan Jabloteh	(United States) San Jose Earthquakes	Undisclosed
9 June 2009	Kevaughn Connell	Unattached	San Juan Jabloteh	Free
8 July 2009	Travis Mulraine	Joe Public	San Juan Jabloteh	Undisclosed
13 July 2009	(Japan) Yu Hoshide	(United States) Northern Virginia Royals	Joe Public	Free
16 July 2009	Jan-Michael Williams	(Hungary) Ferencváros	W Connection	Free
23 July 2009	Errol McFarlane	St. Ann's Rangers	(United States) Rochester Rhinos	Undisclosed
23 July 2009	Russell Latapy	Unattached	Caledonia AIA	Free
27 July 2009	Anthony Rougier	Unattached	FC South End	Free
4 August 2009	Trent Noel	United Petrotrin	Joe Public	Undisclosed
4 August 2009	Marcus Joseph	FC South End	Joe Public	Free
4 August 2009	Daneil Cyrus	Trinidad and Tobago U20	Joe Public	Free
12 August 2009	(Sierra Leone) Alusine Bangura	(Sierra Leone) Mighty Blackpool	W Connection	Free
14 August 2009	Romauld Aguillera	Unattached	W Connection	Free
20 August 2009	Dennis Lawrence	Unattached	San Juan Jabloteh	Free
24 August 2009	(Guyana) Randolph Jerome	(United States) Pittsburgh Riverhounds	Caledonia AIA	Loan
1 September 2009	Radanfah Abu Bakr	Caledonia AIA	(England) Swansea City	Loan
3 September 2009	(England) Luke Gullick	(England) Chippenham Town	San Juan Jabloteh	Loan
13 September 2009	Glenton Wolfe	W Connection	San Juan Jabloteh	Free
21 September 2009	(Brazil) Murilo Da Costa	W Connection	San Juan Jabloteh	Loan
22 September 2009	(United States) Carlos Diaz	(Hungary) Ferencváros	W Connection	Free
17 October 2009	(Jamaica) Kevin Graham	(Jamaica) August Town	Caledonia AIA	Undisclosed
17 October 2009	Ryan Stewart	(United States) Cleveland City Stars	Caledonia AIA	Free
