= Andrew Durant =

Andrew Durant may refer to:

- Andrew Durant (footballer) (born 1985), Guyanese footballer
- Andrew Durant (musician) (1954–1980), Australian musician

== See also ==
- Andrew Durante (born 1982), New Zealand footballer
