= Clive Nobrega =

Guyanese footballer

Personal information
- Full name: Clive Ossafa Nobrega
- Date of birth: 31 August 1989 (age 37)
- Place of birth: St. Cuthbert's Mission, Guyana
- Position: Midfielder

Team information
- Current team: Eagles United FC

Senior career*
Years	Team	Apps	(Gls)
2011–2013	Milerock		
2013–2014	Alpha United		
2015–2016	Slingerz		
2016–	Eagles United FC		

International career^{‡}
2011–	Guyana	17	(0)
- * Club domestic league appearances and goals ‡ National team caps and goals as of 12:43, 4 July 2021 (UTC)

Clive Ossafa Nobrega (born 31 August 1989) is a Guyanese professional footballer who plays as a midfielder for Guyanese club Eagles United FC and the Guyana national team.

== Honours ==
Alpha United

- GFF National Super League: 2013–14

Slingerz

- GFF Elite League: 2015–16
