= Mackenzie High School (Guyana) =

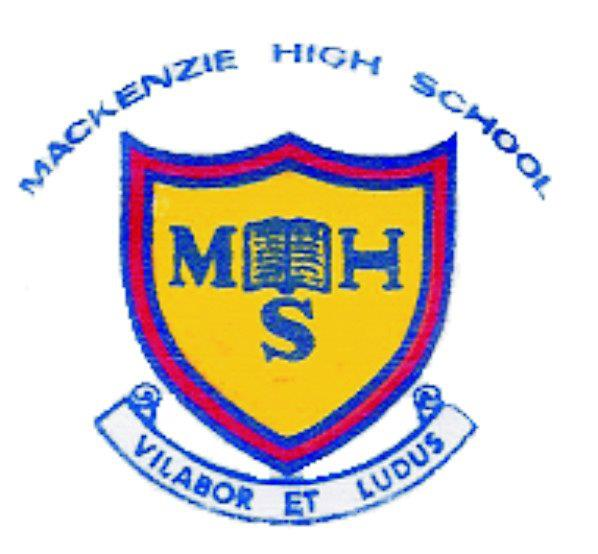

Location
- Linden; Guyana; 6.01160°N 58.30312°W

Information
- Former name: Echols High School
- Type: Public boarding school
- Motto: Latin: Vi Labor Et Ludus
- Established: 1945; 81 years ago
- School district: Region 10
- Principal: Haslyn Small
- Colours: Green and white
- Nickname: MHS
- Website: www.mackenziehigh.school

Mackenzie High school is a secondary school situated at Purple Heart Street, Mackenzie, Linden, Guyana. Admission is based on the Secondary School Entrance Examination (also known as Caribbean Primary Exit Assessment).

Eligible students can be admitted to the school through the National Grade Six Assessment.

== History ==
The history of Mackenzie High School (previously Echols High School) dates back to 1946.

Until 1946 students from that riverine location had to travel to Georgetown if they wished to pursue secondary education. The journey undertaken by children, in those days, was not by road but sailing some 65 miles along the Demerara River. However, their parents were dissatisfied with that situation and a group of them, after World War II ended, explored the possibility of a school in the mining town. Parents initially undertook to employ and pay the teachers but, one year later, DEMBA accepted full responsibility for maintaining Echols High School with 26 children on roll.

The official opening day, on Arvida Road (now Republic Avenue), was recorded as November 19, 1946, with the first principal being Mr. E.U. Wilson. Shortly after, he was succeeded by Mr. Eddie Gunraj, who also hailed from the city.

Ms. Patricia Blair was among the first teachers to be employed from the Mackenzie area and another principal in that period was Mr. Milroy Victor, who, subsequently, was Principal of Central High School in Georgetown. In their tenure, the appropriate uniforms for both boys and girls were in junior and senior categories but all carried the ‘Echols High School’ badge on their berets or caps.

Dr. Dennis Craig, later well known as Vice-Chancellor of the University of Guyana, took up the principalship in 1952 and, by the time he left Echols, in 1956, the number on register had grown to just under 200. The Young Men’s Christian Association (YMCA) building that was near the Recreational Hall (now housing the Linden Museum) was used for general assembly, as the two were among those occupied temporarily by the growing school population.

While the curriculum covered a number of subjects, Science, Art and Physical Education were not taught until 1957, when Mr. D.D. Sim became principal and the programme was reformed. Candidates from Echols no longer took College of Preceptors (CP) or Senior Cambridge examinations but switched to the General Certificate of Education (GCE) ‘O’ Level, from London University and the school became a centre for those tests.

On September 11, 1959, with Sim still in charge, then Minister of Education and Community Development, Mr. Balram Singh Rai formally opened the now renamed Mackenzie High School (MHS) on Purpleheart Street, Mackenzie, where the main building is now located. That structure was built by Sprostons Construction Company to the architectural design of Messrs Mence and Moore.

Through a trust deed, in 1959, as well, DEMBA handed over the property and the facilities within, together with the responsibility for policy and administration, to a Board of Trustees appointed by office. They were the Chief Justice of British Guiana, President of the Royal Agricultural and Commercial Society (RA&CS) of the colony and the Managing Director of DEMBA. Recognition of the four founding members of the school board was reflected in the house system, through which houses were named after Mr. William Grant, Mr. O. D. Cambridge, Mr. Dorsett Carr and Mr. Sam Blackett.

Mr. William Ogle replaced Mr. Sim, from England, before Mr. John Cummings succeeded to the principal post in 1965, a year prior to candidates from the school beginning to sit GCE ‘A’ level exams. The first batch that sat achieved a 100 per cent pass rate. Prior to then, students who qualified to enter sixth form had to seek admission to a senior secondary school in Georgetown, from where they wrote the ‘A’ levels and DEMBA offered scholarships for the purpose.

Cummings died in a road accident on the Soesdyke/Linden Highway in November 1971 and Mr. Seigfred Lyken and Mr. Josephus Bakker, in that order, acted briefly as Principal until Mr. Clifton A. McDonald was appointed to the position in September 1972.

It was during McDonald’s stewardship that the student population grew substantially and necessitated more classrooms. As there was a dire need for a concert hall, too, the Mackenzie High School Board, under the chairmanship of Mr. Clarence London, a senior DEMBA manager, in collaboration with the Gray Dramatic Group, decided to erect an edifice to meet the two needs. On October 17, 1973, the nationalised Guyana Bauxite Company (GUYBAU), in keeping with one of its goals, offered interest free bridging finance for the undertaking. The next year, a three-year project saw the opening of the Linden Concert Hall and School (LICHAS) building, on July 6, 1975. It houses forms one to three in 10 classrooms on the upper flat above the concert facility.

Mackenzie fell under full government control in September 1976 with the advent of free education and the board lost much of its authority.

In 1974, Mackenzie produced its first Guyana Scholar, Alfie Collins, based on his showing at the GCE ‘A’ levels. James Kranenburg became the second Mackenzie Guyana Scholar in 1981 and, in 1985, Nigel Blair was only the third student to be so honoured from that institution.

Mr. Stanley Johnson acted as Principal when McDonald retired in September 1983 and Mrs. Gloria Britton got the appointment in 1985. Mrs. Janice Gibson took over from Britton in 1992 and stayed until 2005 as the second woman principal. On her retirement in 2005, the former had been the longest serving head in the school’s history, with a tenure lasting 13 years. Her successor was her deputy, another female, Mrs. Cheryl McDonald, who retired in 2011. Her Deputy, Mr. Gary Roberts took over from her.

The current principal is Mr Haslyn Small.

== House System ==
Over the years in an effort to promote competition amongst students and teachers, Mackenzie High School has maintained a House System.

The house system was initially named after the founder members of the supervisory board namely Mr. William Grant, Mr. Sam Blackett, Mr. Dawson Carr, Mr. Charles Gittens, Mr. F. Cheddie, Mr. W. Wright, Mr. William Nedd, Mr. O.D. Cambridge and the lone woman, Mrs. Beryl Joseph.

The four Houses were namely:

- Blackett House represented by Blue
- Cambridge House represented by Green
- Carr House represented by Yellow
- Grant House represented by Maroon

== Head Teachers/Principals ==
- 1946-1952 Mr. E.U. Wilson, Mr. Eddie Gunraj and Mr. Milroy Victor
- 1952-1956 Dr. Dennis Craig
- 1956-1960 Mr. D.D. Sim
- 1960-1965 Mr. William Ogle
- 1965-1971 Mr. John Cummings
- 1972-1983 Mr. Clifton McDonald
- 1985-1992 Mrs. Gloria Britton
- 1992-2005 Mrs. Janice Gibson
- 2005-2011 Mrs. Cheryl McDonald
- 2014–2017 Mr. Gary Roberts
- present Mr. Haslyn Small
