= 2013–14 GFF National Super League =

GFF Super League
- Season: 2013–14
- Champions: Alpha United FC
- Matches: 120
- Goals: 405 (3.38 per match)

The 2013–14 GFF National Super League is the 14th season of the highest competitive football league in Guyana, after it was founded in 1990.

== Teams ==
Team	City	Stadium
Alpha United	Georgetown	Bourda Cricket Ground
Buxton United	Enmore	Enmore Recreation Ground
BV/Triumph United	Beterverwagting	BV Triumph Ground
Den Amstel	Uitvlugt	Uitvlugt Community Centre Ground
GDF	Georgetown	Georgetown Football Stadium
Grove Hi-Tech		
Mahaica Determinators		
Milerock	Linden	MSC Ground
New Amsterdam United	Berbice	#5 Ground
Riddim Squad	Berbice	#5 Ground
Rosignol United	Blairmont	Blairmont Community Centre
Santos	Georgetown	Georgetown Football Stadium
Silver Shattas	Linden	MSC Ground
Western Tigers	Georgetown	Georgetown Football Stadium
Winners Connection		
Young Achievers	Berbice	#5 Ground

== League table ==
Pos	Team	Pld	W	D	L	GF	GA	GD	Pts	Qualification or relegation
1	Alpha United	15	15	0	0	62	7	+55	45	Qualification to 2014 CFU Club Championship
2	GDF	15	10	3	2	40	14	+26	33	
3	Western Tigers	15	11	1	3	29	14	+15	34	
4	Buxton United	15	9	2	4	23	15	+8	29	
5	Den Amstel	15	8	2	5	28	17	+11	26	
6	Grove Hi-Tech	15	6	4	5	23	24	−1	22	
7	New Amsterdam United	15	6	1	8	38	25	+13	19	
8	Rosignol United	15	4	4	7	22	43	−21	16	
9	Silver Shattas	15	5	3	7	19	27	−8	18	
10	Riddim Squad	15	5	2	8	19	28	−9	17	
11	Winners Connection	15	5	3	7	22	34	−12	18	
12	Milerock	15	5	2	8	20	20	0	17	
13	BV/Triumph United	15	4	3	8	19	34	−15	15	Relegation
14	Mahaica Determinators	15	4	3	8	13	28	−15	15	Relegation
15	Santos	15	3	5	7	18	29	−11	14	Relegation
16	Young Achievers	15	1	0	14	10	46	−36	3	Relegation

Updated to match(es) played on 5 August 2014. Source:
Rules for classification: 1) points; 2) goal difference; 3) number of goals scored.
