= 2012–13 GFF National Super League =

GFF National Super League
- Season: 2012–13

The 2012–13 GFF National Super League is the 15th season of the competition.

== Table ==
Pos	Team	Pld	W	D	L	GF	GA	GD	Pts	Qualification or relegation
1	Alpha United	16	13	2	1	70	7	+63	41	
2	Pele	18	10	5	3	30	12	+18	35	
3	Western Tigers	16	8	4	4	25	20	+5	28	
4	Milerock	18	8	1	9	29	31	−2	25	
5	Den Amstel Porknockers	17	6	5	6	19	24	−5	23	
6	BV/Triumph United	18	5	6	7	19	23	−4	21	
7	Rosignol United	17	5	6	6	25	33	−8	21	
8	Buxton United	18	6	3	9	16	25	−9	21	
9	Amelia's Ward (R)	18	3	5	10	16	39	−23	14	Relegation to 2013–14 Guyana FA Regional Leagues
10	Uitvlugt Warriors (R)	18	4	1	13	18	53	−35	13	Relegation to 2013–14 Guyana FA Regional Leagues

Source: RSSSF
Rules for classification: 1) points; 2) goal difference; 3) number of goals scored.
(R) Relegated
