= Seweyo =

- military base
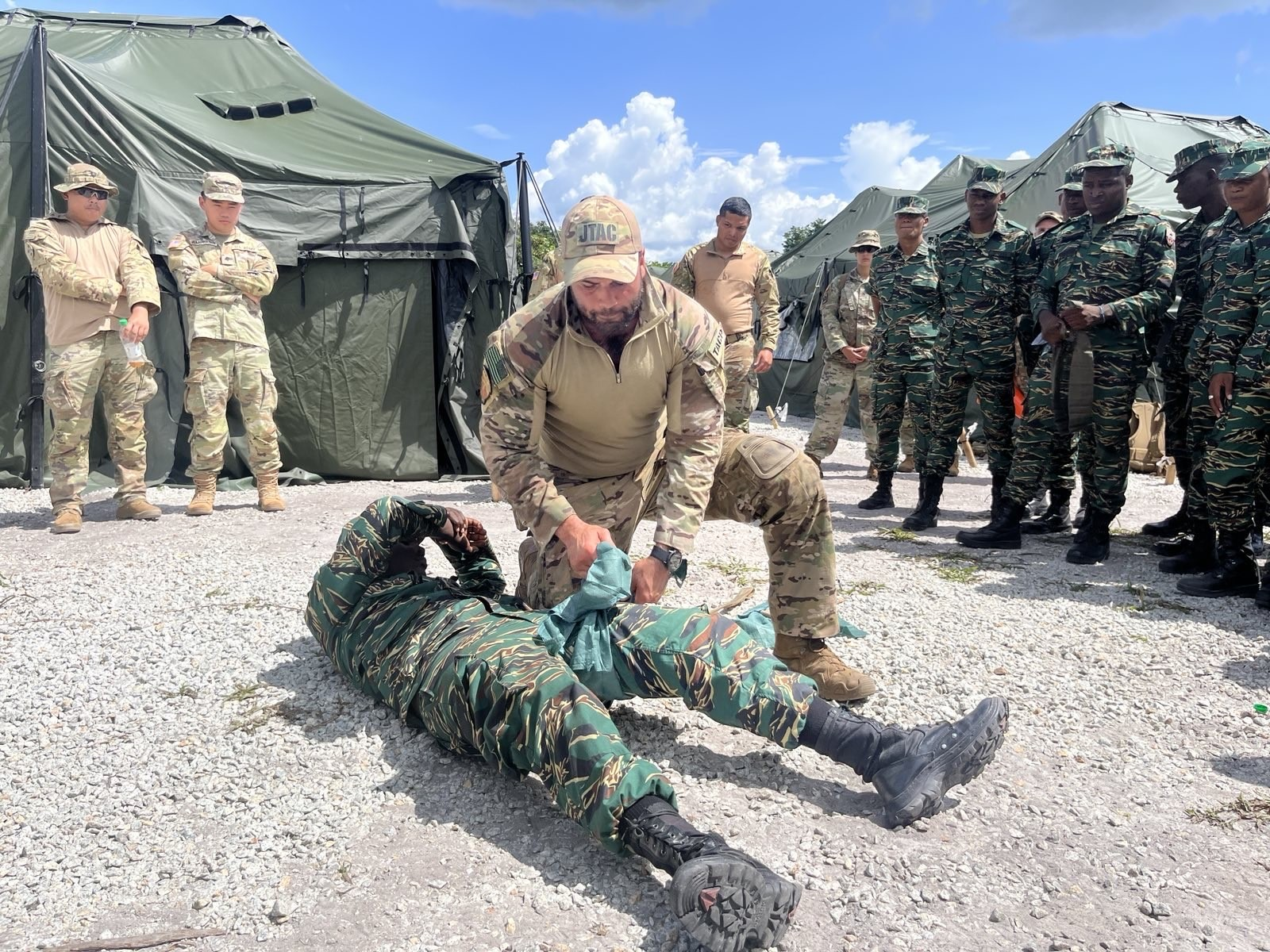
- Training at Camp Seweyo

- Location in Guyana
- Coordinates: 6.2649°N 58.2518°W
- Country: Guyana
- Region: Demerara-Mahaica
- Time zone: UTC-4
- Climate: Af

Seweyo is a Guyana Defence Force (GDF) training camp located 36.5 km (22.7 mi) up the Soesdyke-Linden Highway in Guyana. It caters for all aspects of Skill at Arms and Ground Operations Training.

Seweyo training camp recently completed disaster relief training for GDF reservists.
