= 2010 GFF National Super League =

GFF National Super League
- Season: 2010
- Champions: Alpha United
- Relegated: Bakewell Topp XX; Liquid Gold
- CFU Club Championship: Alpha United; Milerock
- CONCACAF Champions League: Alpha United (2011 CFU Club Championship third place)
- Biggest away win: Buxton United 1–8 Alpha United (9 Apr. 2011)

The 2010 GFF National Super League was the third season of the National Super League under its current format, and the twentieth reported season of top tier Guyanese football. The champions for the second consecutive year were Alpha United who did not lose a single match during the campaign. As champions, Alpha United, along with league runners-up, Milerock earned a berth into the 2011 CFU Club Championship.

The season began in February and ended in September.

== Teams ==
Club	Home city	Home ground
Alpha United	Providence	Providence Stadium

== Regular stage ==
=== Table ===
Pos	Team	Pld	W	D	L	GF	GA	GD	Pts	Qualification or relegation
1	Alpha United (C)	16	12	4	0	39	9	+30	40	2011 CFU Club Championship preliminary phase
2	Milerock	18	10	2	6	24	21	+3	32	2011 CFU Club Championship preliminary phase
3	Guyana Defence Force	18	9	4	5	32	17	+15	31	
4	Rosignal United	18	8	5	5	35	33	+2	29	
5	Camptown	17	8	4	5	36	27	+9	28	
6	Seawall	18	6	3	9	14	21	−7	21	
7	Buxton United	18	4	7	7	23	33	−10	19	
8	Victoria Kings	18	5	3	10	27	32	−5	18	Relegation playoffs
9	Topp XX	18	4	4	10	16	33	−17	16	Relegation playoffs
10	Liquid Gold (R)	17	3	2	12	15	35	−20	11	Relegation to 2011 Guyana FA Regional Leagues

Source: FIFA
Rules for classification: 1) points; 2) goal difference; 3) number of goals scored.
(C) Champions; (R) Relegated

== Playoff stage ==
- RSSSF
