= List of Trinidadian football transfers 2014–15 =

Trinidadian football transfers

This is a list of Trinidadian football transfers during the 2014–15 season. Only moves featuring at least one TT Pro League club are listed. Transfers that were made following the conclusion of the 2013–14 season on 20 May 2014, but many transfers will only officially go through on 1 July, during the 2014–15 season, and following the season until 30 June 2015, are listed.

Players without a club cannot join one at any time, either during or in between transfer windows. Clubs within or outside the Pro League may sign players on loan at any time. If need be, clubs may sign a goalkeeper on an emergency loan, if all others are unavailable.

== Transfers ==
All players and clubs without with a flag are from Trinidad and Tobago. In addition, transfers involving Major League Soccer clubs in the United States and Canada technically have the league as the second party and not the listed club. MLS player contracts are owned by the league and not by individual clubs.

| Date | Player | Moving from | Moving to | Fee |
|---|---|---|---|---|
| 1 July 2014 | Levi García | Siparia Spurs | Central FC | Free |
| 1 July 2014 | Denzil Daniel | Unattached | Central FC | Free |
| 1 July 2014 | Nathaniel García | Unattached | Central FC | Free |
| 10 July 2014 | Elijah Manners | San Juan Jabloteh | Central FC | Free |
| 22 July 2014 | Trevin Caesar | North East Stars | (United States) San Antonio Scorpions | Undisclosed |
| 22 July 2014 | Willis Plaza | Central FC | (Belgium) C.S. Visé | Free |
| 22 July 2014 | Rundell Winchester | Central FC | (Belgium) C.S. Visé | Free |
| 25 July 2014 | Glenton Wolfe | North East Stars | (India) Churchill Brothers | Undisclosed |
| 25 July 2014 | Rennie Britto | San Juan Jabloteh | Malabar | Free |
| 6 August 2014 | Jamal Jack | Central FC | (Guyana) Alpha United FC | Loan |
