= Kagiso (disambiguation) =

Kagiso is a township in Gauteng Province, South Africa. Kagiso or Kagisho may also refer to:

- Kagiso (given name)
- Kagiso Media, a media corporation in South Africa
