= Kagiso (given name) =

Kagiso or Kagisho is a Tswana given name. It means "peace" In the English language. Some people called Kagiso include

- Kagisho Dikgacoi (born 1984), South African footballer
- Kagiso Kilego (born 1983), Botswana sprinter
- Kagiso Lediga, South African stand-up comedian, actor and director
- Kagiso Mohale (born 1994), South African first-class cricketer
- Kagiso Rabada (born 1995), South African cricketer
- Kagiso Rapulana (born 1991), South African first-class cricketer
- Kagiso Tshelametsi (born 1980), Botswana football goalkeeper
