= Maestro Mensah =

Ghanaian footballer

Personal information
- Place of birth: Ghana
- Position(s): Defender

Senior career*
Years	Team	Apps	(Gls)
- Heart of Lions F.C.
–2016	Cunupia FC		
2016	Morvant Caledonia United		
- *Club domestic league appearances and goals

Maestro Mensah is a Ghanaian footballer who is last known to have been part of Morvant Caledonia United of the TT Pro League in 2016.

== Trinidad and Tobago ==
Switching from Cunupia to Morvant Caledonia United of the TT Pro League in 2016, Mensah won the 2016 Lucozade Goal Shield with the club, saying that a defensive style of play was entrenched in their team.

Made an own goal on the 11th minute in a 3–2 defeat to Central.
