= Shawn Bishop =

Guyanese footballer (born 1979)

Personal information
- Full name: Shawn Bishop
- Date of birth: 15 September 1979 (age 47)
- Place of birth: Georgetown, Guyana
- Position: Midfielder

Team information
- Current team: Alpha United FC

Senior career*
Years	Team	Apps	(Gls)
2005	Caledonia AIA		
2005–2007	Guyana Defence Force		
2007	Caledonia AIA		
2007–	Alpha United FC		

International career
2006–2008	Guyana	23	(2)
- * Club domestic league appearances and goals

Shawn Bishop (born 15 September 1979, in Georgetown) is an association footballer from Guyana. Bishop plays in midfield and currently plays for Alpha United FC in the GFF National Super League. He has also played, and scored, for the Guyana national football team.

== Club career ==
=== Early career ===
Bishop began his career in 2005, with Trinidad and Tobago's Caledonia AIA, as they finished third in the 2005 TT Pro League. He left the club in the same year to join Guyana Defence Force in his home country. Bishop went on to play for the club in 2006, before rejoining Caledonia AIA the following year. However, after less than a year in his second spell at Caledonia, Shawn moved on again to play for Alpha United FC, where he has remained ever since.

=== Alpha United FC ===
Since joining Alpha in 2007, Bishop has won two GFF National Super League titles, in 2009 and 2010. These successes saw Alpha United FC qualify for the 2010 CFU Club Championship, where he played four times, and the 2011 CFU Club Championship, where he made three appearances. He has scored for the club in every season since 2008. His first goal for Alpha came against Camptown FC in the 2008 Mayor's Cup semi-final match on 2 April, which Alpha won 2-0. He scored his first league goal for Alpha on April 25, in a 2nd round 3-3 draw with Camptown FC. Bishop continued his goalscoring feats into the 2009 season, netting against Western Tigers in a 5-0 first-round victory in the league, and also scoring against Fruta Conquerors in the East Coast Reunion Football Competition final, which Alpha won 6-1. Shawn scored three times in the 2010 season, his highest season total since joining Alpha. Two of his goals came against Milerock FC and the other strike came against Victoria Kings in a 3-2 league victory.

=== Street Football ===
Bishop played for and captained Holmes Street, Tiger Bay in the Guinness Greatest of de Street four-a-side tournament in 2008. Tiger Bay eventually won the competition, beating Albouystown 1-0 in the final. He scored against Charles Street in a 1-0 win on 21 November 2008, in a first round match.

== International career ==
Bishop first played for Guyana in 2006, being included in the country's 2007 Caribbean Cup squad. At the tournament, Shawn scored his only two international goals to date, netting against the Netherlands Antilles in a 5-0 win, and scoring the only goal against Grenada on 10 September.

Bishop played twelve times for Guyana in 2008, including six appearances at the 2008 Caribbean Championships. His most recent appearance for the national team was against Trinidad and Tobago on 9 November 2008, in a 1-1 draw. Bishop has a total of 23 caps for Guyana.
