= Howard Lowe =

Guyanese footballer

Personal information
- Full name: Howard Andre Lowe
- Date of birth: 14 July 1979 (age 47)
- Place of birth: Linden, Guyana
- Position: Defender

Senior career*
Years	Team	Apps	(Gls)
2002–2003	Upper Demerara		
2004–2006	North East Stars		
2007–2008	Caledonia AIA		
2009–2015	Alpha United		

International career
2002–2010	Guyana	46	(1)
- * Club domestic league appearances and goals

Howard Andre Lowe (born 14 July 1979) is a Guyanese former professional footballer who played as a defender. He formerly captained the Guyana national team, for which made 46 appearances and scored one goal.

== International career ==
Lowe made 46 appearances for the Guyana national team between 2002 and 2010. He scored one goal in 2007.

== Career statistics ==
Guyana score listed first, score column indicates score after the Lowe goal.

International goals by date, venue, opponent, score, result and competition
No.	Cap	Date	Venue	Opponent	Score	Result	Competition	Ref.
1	16	16 January 2007	Manny Ramjohn Stadium, Marabella, Trinidad and Tobago	Guadeloupe	3–2	4–3	Caribbean Cup	

== Honours ==
North East Stars

- TT Pro League: 2004

Caledonia AIA

- Trinidad and Tobago FA Trophy: 2008

Alpha United

- GFF National Super League: 2009, 2010, 2011–12, 2012–13, 2013–14
