= Bodles, Jamaica =

Coordinates: 17°56′00″N 77°08′00″W

Bodles is a locality in southern Jamaica. Bauxite is found there.

== Transport ==
A railway was constructed in the 1950s for the export of bauxite.

== See also ==
- Railway stations in Jamaica
- Transport in Jamaica
