= Thiago Faria =

Brazilian footballer (born 1989)

Personal information
- Full name: Thiago Henrique Marques Faria
- Date of birth: 13 January 1989 (age 37)
- Place of birth: Belo Horizonte, Brazil
- Height: 1.79 m (5 ft 10 1/2 in)
- Position: Midfielder

Youth career
- 2008: Nelas

Senior career*
Years	Team	Apps	(Gls)
2008	Nelas	1	(0)
2008	Praiense	5	(0)
2009	Pombal	16	(4)
2009–2010	Benfica C. Branco	29	(9)
2010–2011	Boavista São Mateus	16	(4)
2011–2012	Ribeira Brava	26	(4)
2012–2013	União	21	(0)
Total		114	(21)
- * Club domestic league appearances and goals

Thiago Henrique Marques Faria (born 13 January 1989), commonly known as Thiago Faria, is a retired Brazilian footballer.

== Career statistics ==
=== Club ===
Club	Season	League			Cup		Other		Total	
Club	Season	Division	Apps	Goals	Apps	Goals	Apps	Goals	Apps	Goals
Nelas	2007–08	Segunda Divisão	1	0	0	0	0	0	1	0
Praiense	2008–09	Segunda Divisão	5	0	0	0	0	0	5	0
Pombal	2008–09	Terceira Divisão	16	4	0	0	0	0	16	4
Benfica C. Branco	2009–10	Terceira Divisão	28	9	0	0	0	0	28	9
Benfica C. Branco	2010–11	Terceira Divisão	1	0	1 (Note: Appearances in the Taça de Portugal)	0	0	0	2	0
Benfica C. Branco	Total		29	9	1	0	0	0	30	9
Boavista São Mateus	2010–11	Terceira Divisão	16	4	0	0	0	0	16	4
Ribeira Brava	2011–12	Segunda Divisão	26	4	5	0	0	0	31	4
União	2012–13	Segunda Liga	21	0	1 (Note: Appearances in the Taça da Liga)	0	0	0	22	0
Career total			114	21	7	0	0	0	121	21
