= Camptown FC =

- Full name: Camptown Football Club
- League: GFF National Super League
- 2010: 5th

Camptown Football Club is a Guyanese football club based in Georgetown, Guyana that competes in the GFF National Super League, the top tier of Guyanese football. During the 2010 season, Camptown finished in fifth place.
