= Brion Baker =

Guyanese footballer

Personal information
- Full name: Brion Baker
- Date of birth: 19 August 1988 (age 38)
- Place of birth: Guyana
- Position: Midfielder

Senior career*
Years	Team	Apps	(Gls)
2007	Barry Buccaneers		
2008–2009	Caledonia AIA		
2010–2014	Alpha Union Georgetown		

International career^{‡}
2008–2012	Guyana	11	(0)
- * Club domestic league appearances and goals as of 4 January 2012 ‡ National team caps and goals as of 4 January 2012

Brion Baker (born 19 August 1988) in Guyana is a footballer who plays as a midfielder. He currently plays for Alpha Union Georgetown and the Guyana national football team.

== Club career ==
In 2007, he played for American college side Barry Buccaneers. In 2008, he signed for TT Pro League outfit Caledonia AIA where he played for 2 seasons. In 2010, he moved back to his homeland to play for Alpha Union Georgetown.

== International career ==
On 8 July 2008 he made his debut for the Guyana national football team in a friendly match against Trinidad and Tobago national football team.
