= Kayode McKinnon =

Guyanese footballer

Personal information
- Full name: Kayode Andrew McKinnon
- Date of birth: November 28, 1979 (age 46)
- Place of birth: Linden, Guyana
- Height: 1.79 m (5 ft 10 in)
- Position: Midfielder

Senior career*
Years	Team	Apps	(Gls)
2000–2002	Bakewell Topp XX		
2004–2006	North East Stars		
2005	→ Caledonia AIA (loan)		
2007	Joe Public		
2008–2011	Tobago United		
2010	→ Bakewell Topp XX (loan)		
2011–	Antigua Barracuda FC	1	(0)

International career^{‡}
2002–	Guyana	60	(2)
- * Club domestic league appearances and goals as of June 12, 2014 ‡ National team caps and goals as of November 1, 2015

Kayode McKinnon (born November 28, 1979) is a Guyanese former footballer. He is also a soccer coach in the United States. He currently is the C.E.O. of Kayode McKinnon & Co. where he trains athletes at all levels of the game, and the technical director of KM Soccer Academy (KMSA).

== Club career ==
McKinnon began his professional career with Bakewell Topp XX in the Guyana National Football League, based in his hometown of Linden. He then joined Trinidadian team North East Stars and won a league championship title in 2004. He went on to play seven seasons in the TT Pro League, including Joe Public and Tobago United. During this time he also played with Caledonia AIA, living in Spain (Las Palmas).

Antigua Barracuda F.C., part of the USL Professional League, welcomed McKinnon for the 2011 season. He made his debut for the Barracudas on April 23 in a 3-2 win against Sevilla FC Puerto Rico.

== International career ==
McKinnon made his first appearance for the Guyana National Team in 2002 and has since gone on to win 25 caps, scoring 2 goals. He played in two of Guyana's qualification games for the 2006 FIFA World Cup, and again in qualification for the 2010 FIFA World Cup. He also played in the 2014 FIFA World Cup, taking the country's football ranking to the highest it had ever been to date. Though he has played extensively on the international stage, he has always been considered a Golden Jaguar (unofficial name for the Guyana National Football Team). Nicknamed "the magician" for his unique playing style, McKinnon is heralded as one of Guyana's most talented athletes in the sport.

== Coaching career ==
Kayode McKinnon has coached professionally in the USA since 2012. He holds the FA level III-A (UEFA A) credential, the highest possible coaching license, among others. His development of an elite coaching system has taken his athletes to national recognition. As a coach he trains players at all levels of soccer/fútbol including varsity, collegiate, olympic, and professional.

== Philanthropy ==
Kayo's Football Academy is the non-profit endeavor of Kayode McKinnon & Co. Founded in 2008, the organization provides elite coaching for disadvantaged children. The academy focuses on providing soccer training to athletes from ages 6 – 16 years, emphasizing all principles of the game from fundamentals to advanced techniques. It is based in Linden, Guyana - McKinnon's hometown where he started playing soccer at 3 years old.

McKinnon has also engaged in multiple charity events, the most prominent being a double marathon of the Soesdyke-Linden Highway to raise funds for AIDS awareness.

== Podcast ==
Kayode McKinnon currently hosts the Coach Kayo show every Saturday night where he discusses coaching tactics. This podcast is available on Facebook, Spotify, Apple Podcast, and other streaming platforms.
