= Rosignol United FC =

Rosignol United
- Full name: Berbice Rosignol United Football Club
- Nickname(s): Rosignol
- League: GFF National Super League
- 2010: 4th

Rosignol United is a Guyanese football club based in Berbice that competes in the GFF National Super League, the top tier of Guyanese football. In the 2010–11, the club finished in fourth place.
