= Kelvin McKenzie (footballer) =

Guyanese footballer

Personal information
- Full name: Kelvin McKenzie
- Date of birth: 2 February 1983 (age 43)
- Place of birth: Georgetown, Guyana
- Position: Defender

Youth career
- 2003–2004: FC Georgetown

Senior career*
Years	Team	Apps	(Gls)
2005	FC Georgetown	15	(0)
2006	Alpha United	11	(0)
2007–2008	North East Stars	24	(0)
2009–2012	Alpha United	6	(0)

International career
2005–	Guyana	2	(0)
- * Club domestic league appearances and goals

Kelvin McKenzie (born February 2, 1983, in Georgetown, Guyana) is a retired footballer who played for multiple teams, most recently Alpha United.

== International career ==
McKenzie was a member of the Guyana national football team.
