= Milerock FC =

Milerock
- Full name: Milerock Football Club
- Nickname: Strikers
- Founded: 1972
- Ground: Mackenzie Sports Club
- Capacity: 1,000

Milerock is a Guyanese football club based in Linden, competing in the Guyana National Football League, the top tier of Guyanese football. The club has a local rivalry with fellow Linden-based club, Topp XX.

== Notable players ==
- Clive Nobrega
