= Richard Reynolds (footballer) =

Guyanese footballer

Personal information
- Date of birth: 13 July 1980 (age 46)
- Place of birth: Providence, Guyana
- Height: 1.83 m (6 ft 0 in)
- Position: Goalkeeper

Team information
- Current team: Alpha United FC
- Number: 22

Senior career*
Years	Team	Apps	(Gls)
2001–2004	Camptown FC	?	(0)
2004–2008	Caledonia AIA	?	(0)
2008–2010	Robinhood	?	(0)
2010–2014	Alpha United	?	(0)
2014--	SV Nishan 42	41	(0)

International career^{‡}
2004–	Guyana	22	(0)
- * Club domestic league appearances and goals as of 20 February 2011 ‡ National team caps and goals as of 22 June 2008

Richard Reynolds is a Guyana footballer who currently plays for SV Nishan 42 in the SVB Hoofdklasse and the Guyana national team.
