= Wolry Wolfe =

Jamaican footballer (born 1981)

Personal information
- Date of birth: 12 August 1981 (age 45)
- Place of birth: Bodles, Jamaica
- Height: 1.71 m (5 ft 7 in)
- Position: Left winger

Team information
- Current team: Humble Lions

Senior career*
Years	Team	Apps	(Gls)
2000–2006	Hazard United	?	(?)
2006	Joe Public	?	(?)
2006–2008	Portmore United	?	(?)
2008–2009	Joe Public	?	(?)
2009	→ Ferencváros (loan)	5	(0)
2009	→ Central Coast Mariners (loan)	0	(0)
2009–2010	Portmore United	?	(?)
2010–2011	Benfica (JAM)	?	(?)
2011–	Humble Lions	30	(7)

International career^{‡}
2007–2009	Jamaica	14	(2)
- * Club domestic league appearances and goals as of 15 January 2011 ‡ National team caps and goals as of 21 January 2011

Wolry Wolfe (born 12 August 1981) is a Jamaican international footballer who plays professionally for Humble Lions, as a left winger.

== Early and personal life ==
Born in Bodles, Wolfe is the brother of Rafe Wolfe and Kemeel Wolfe, and the cousin of Omar Cummings.

== Career ==
=== Club career ===
Wolfe began his professional career in Jamaica in 2000 with Hazard United, and after a brief spell in Trinidad and Tobago with Joe Public, returned to the renamed Portmore United in 2006. After two seasons, Wolfe returned to Joe Public, spending loan spells in Hungary and Australia with Ferencváros and Central Coast Mariners respectively. Wolfe returned to Jamaica in 2009 with Portmore United, moving to Benfica (JAM) in 2010. During the January 2011 transfer window, Wolry Wolfe moved to Humble Lions.

=== International career ===
Wolfe earned 14 caps for Jamaica between 2007 and 2009, including in three FIFA World Cup qualifying matches.
