= William Oliveira (footballer, born 1984) =

Brazilian footballer

Willian Oliveira
Personal information
- Full name: William da Silva Oliveira
- Date of birth: May 31, 1984 (age 42)
- Place of birth: São Paulo, Brazil
- Height: 5 ft 7 in (1.70 m)
- Position: Midfielder

Senior career*
Years	Team	Apps	(Gls)
2000–2001	União Bandeirante FC	26	(5)
2002–2003	Vitória Futebol Clube (ES)	22	(2)
2003–2007	W Connection	66	(20)
2007	Chicago Fire	8	(1)
2009	W Connection		
- * Club domestic league appearances and goals

William da Silva Oliveira (born May 31, 1984 in São Paulo, Brazil) is a former Brazilian soccer midfielder.

== Career ==
Born in Brazil, Oliveira began playing with local sides União Bandeirante FC and Vitória Futebol Clube. He signed with Trinidadian club W Connection's youth system in 2003, and played for the club for four years. After a brief trial period, Oliveira was signed to the Chicago Fire of Major League Soccer on May 24, 2007. However, Oliveira was released before the end of the season.
