= Christopher Harvey (footballer) =

Jamaican footballer (born 1982)

Personal information
- Full name: Christopher Harvey
- Date of birth: 9 October 1982 (age 44)
- Place of birth: Jamaica
- Height: 1.86 m (6 ft 1 in)
- Position: Midfielder

Team information
- Current team: Harbour View

Senior career*
Years	Team	Apps	(Gls)
2003–2006	Portmore United		
2004	→ W Connection (loan)		
2005	→ W Connection (loan)		
2006	→ W Connection (loan)		
2006–2011	Harbour View		
2008	→ Joe Public (loan)		
2011	Antigua Barracuda FC	22	(2)
2012–	Harbour View	23	(0)

International career
2007	Jamaica	5	(1)
- * Club domestic league appearances and goals as of 18 June 2012

Christopher Harvey (born 9 October 1982) is a Jamaican footballer who currently plays for Harbour View.

== Club career ==
Harvey played for Jamaican clubs Portmore United and Harbour View, and spent time on loan at with Trinidadian teams W Connection, and Joe Public. Harvey has won three Jamaica National Premier League titles - one with Portmore in 2003 and two with Harbour View in 2010 - and two JFF Champions Cup titles, both with Portmore in 2003 and 2005. He won the 2007 CFU Club Championship with Harbour View, and played in the 2008 CONCACAF Champions' Cup and the 2008-09 CONCACAF Champions League.

In 2011 Harvey transferred to the new Antigua Barracuda FC team prior to its first season in the USL Professional Division. He made his debut for the Barracudas on 21 April 2011, a 1–0 loss to Sevilla FC Puerto Rico.

== International career ==
Harvey made his debt for the Jamaica national team in 2007, and has gone on to receive 5 caps for the Reggae Boyz, scoring one goal in the process.
