= Lorenzo Wiebers =

Surinamese footballer

Personal information
- Full name: Lorenzo Wiebers
- Date of birth: February 2, 1977 (age 49)
- Place of birth: Paramaribo, Suriname
- Positions: Centre back; defensive midfielder

Team information
- Current team: SV Robinhood

Senior career*
Years	Team	Apps	(Gls)
2004–2006	Royal '95	30	(0)
2007–2009	Tobago United	54	(0)
2009–2010	SV Robinhood	00	(0)

International career
2006–2008	Suriname	12	(0)
- * Club domestic league appearances and goals

Lorenzo Wiebers (born 2 February 1977 in Paramaribo) is a footballer from Suriname who played for SV Robinhood.

== Career ==
Wiebers began his career for Surinamese side Royal '95 before transferring to Trinidad and Tobago team Tobago United.

== International career ==
He plays for the Suriname national football team.
