= Pierre Richard Bruny =

Haitian footballer (born 1972)

Pierre-Richard Bruny
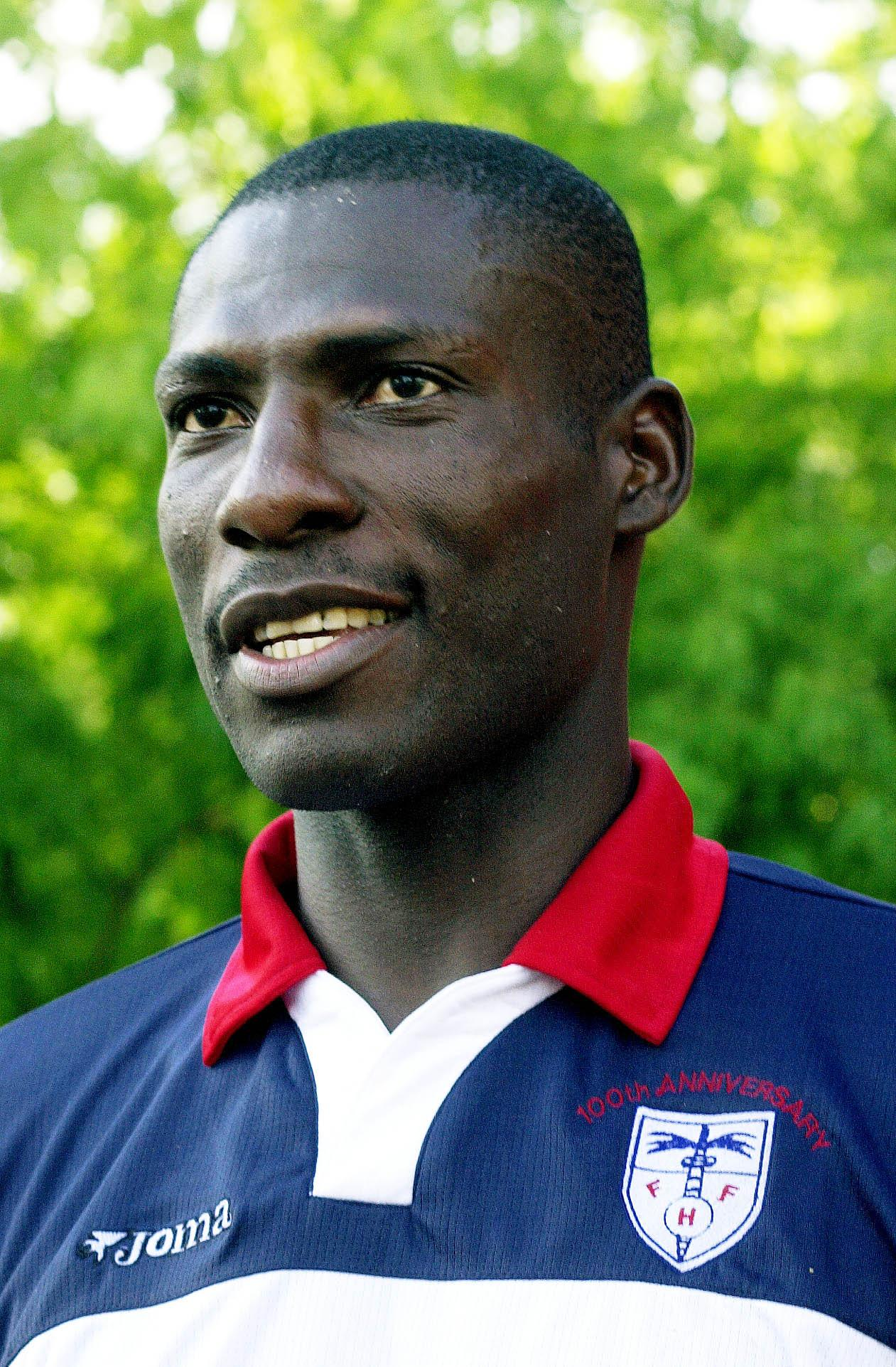
- Bruny with Haiti in 2004

Personal information
- Date of birth: 6 April 1972 (age 54)
- Place of birth: Port-Salut, Haiti
- Position: Defender

Senior career*
Years	Team	Apps	(Gls)
1992–2000	Don Bosco FC		
2001–2002	Joe Public		
2003–2015	Don Bosco FC		

International career
1998–2010	Haiti	95	(2)
- * Club domestic league appearances and goals

Pierre-Richard Bruny (born 6 April 1972) is a Haitian former professional footballer who played as a defender for Don Bosco FC and Joe Public.

== Club career ==
Mostly playing as a sweeper, Bruny played most of his career for Don Bosco FC, except for two seasons at Trinidadian side Joe Public F.C.

== International career ==
A former national team captain and long-serving veteran, Bruny made his debut for Haiti in a July 1998 Caribbean Cup match against the Netherlands Antilles. He was a Haiti squad member at the 2002 and 2007 Gold Cup Finals and he played in 16 World Cup qualification matches between 2000 and 2008. Having announced he would retire after the 2007 Gold Cup, he continued his career in 2008.

== Style of play ==
In 2020 Stéphane Guillaume praised Bruny for his leadership qualities.

== Honours ==
Haiti

- Caribbean Cup: 2007

Individual

- Caribbean Cup Most Valuable Player: 2007
