= Kester Jacobs =

Guyanese footballer

Personal information
- Date of birth: July 28, 1987 (age 39)
- Place of birth: Den Amstel, Guyana
- Position: Defender

Team information
- Current team: Alpha United FC

Senior career*
| Years | Team | Apps | (Gls) |
| 2007–2008 | Santos F.C. | | |
| 2009 | Caledonia AIA | | |
| 2010–? | Alpha United FC | | |
| ?– | Nishan'42 | ? | (1) |

International career^{‡}
- Guyana U20
| 2008– | Guyana | 22 | (0) |
- * Club domestic league appearances and goals ‡ National team caps and goals as of 20 July 2014

Kester Jacobs (born 28 July 1987) is a Guyanese international footballer who plays for Nishan'42 in the SVB Hoofdklasse, as a defender.
