= Kagiso Tshelametsi =

Motswana footballer

Personal information
- Full name: Kagiso Tshelametsi
- Date of birth: 7 July 1980 (age 46)
- Place of birth: Botswana
- Position: Goalkeeper

Team information
- Current team: Notwane FC

Senior career*
Years	Team	Apps	(Gls)
1999–2003	Mogoditshane Fighters		
2003–2004	FC Satmos		
2004–2005	Caledonia AIA		
2005–2006	Notwane FC		
2006–2007	FC Satmos		
2007–	Notwane FC		

International career
2000–2006	Botswana	12	(0)
- * Club domestic league appearances and goals

Kagiso Tshelametsi (born 7 July 1980) is a Motswana footballer who plays as a goalkeeper for Notwane FC. He won 12 caps for the Botswana national football team between 2000 and 2006.He is also Baoganne Tshelametsi's cousin who worked under the Botswana military police together with the former Botswana president Sir Seretse Khama Ian Khama.
