= Topp XX FC =

Top XX
- Full name: Sport Linden Top XX Football Club
- Nickname(s): Lions
- League: GFF Elite League
- 2017–18: 6th

Top XX Football Club is a Guyanese football club based in Linden, competing in the Guyana National Football League, the top tier of Guyanese football.
