= Sheldon Holder =

Guyanese footballer (born 1991)

Personal information
- Date of birth: 30 September 1991 (age 35)
- Place of birth: Georgetown, Guyana
- Height: 1.73 m (5 ft 8 in)
- Position: Forward

Team information
- Current team: Morvant Caledonia United

Senior career*
Years	Team	Apps	(Gls)
2011–2013	Morvant Caledonia United	?	(?)
2013–2015	Alpha United	?	(?)
2015–	Morvant Caledonia United	?	(?)

International career^{‡}
2011–	Guyana	32	(9)
- * Club domestic league appearances and goals as of 7 September 2018 ‡ National team caps and goals as of 13 October 2018

Sheldon Holder (born 30 September 1991) is a Guyanese footballer who plays for the Morvant Caledonia United of Trinidad & Tobago, and the Guyanese national team. He scored his first hat-trick, internationally during the CONCACAF Nations League qualifying rounds where he scored three goals in the 0-8 match against the Turks and Caicos Islands.

== International career ==
=== Guyana ===
An international for Guyana since 2011, he was named to the final 23-man squad for the 2019 CONCACAF Gold Cup on 31 May 2019.

=== International goals ===
Scores and results list Guyana's goal tally first.

No.	Date	Venue	Opponent	Score	Result	Competition
1.	1 February 2015	Barbados National Stadium, Bridgetown, Barbados	Barbados	1–0	2–2	Friendly
2.	22 March 2015	Providence Stadium, Bourda, Guyana	Saint Lucia	2–0	2–0	Friendly
3.	1 June 2016	Ergilio Hato Stadium, Willemstad, Curaçao	Curaçao	1–1	2–5	2017 Caribbean Cup qualification
4.	15 November 2017	Ato Boldon Stadium, Couva, Trinidad and Tobago	Trinidad and Tobago	1–0	1–1	Friendly
5.	13 October 2018	TCIFA National Academy, Providenciales, Turks and Caicos Islands	Turks and Caicos Islands	1–0	8–0	2019–20 CONCACAF Nations League qualification
6.	13 October 2018	TCIFA National Academy, Providenciales, Turks and Caicos Islands	Turks and Caicos Islands	3–0	8–0	2019–20 CONCACAF Nations League qualification
7.	13 October 2018	TCIFA National Academy, Providenciales, Turks and Caicos Islands	Turks and Caicos Islands	4–0	8–0	2019–20 CONCACAF Nations League qualification
8.	6 September 2019	Ergilio Hato Stadium, Willemstad, Curaçao	Aruba	1–0	1–0	2019–20 CONCACAF Nations League B
9.	14 October 2019	Synthetic Track and Field Facility, Leonora, Guyana	Antigua and Barbuda	3–1	5–1	2019–20 CONCACAF Nations League B
