= Shawn Beveney =

Guyanese footballer

Personal information
- Date of birth: 27 March 1982 (age 44)
- Place of birth: Georgetown, Guyana
- Height: 6 ft 2 in (1.88 m)
- Position: Attacking midfielder

Senior career*
Years	Team	Apps	(Gls)
1999–2005	Western Tigers		
2006	North East Stars		
2006–2008	Dulwich Hamlet	55	(21)
2008	Kingstonian	4	(2)
2008	Lewes		
2008	Cray Wanderers	10	(6)
2009	Ashford Town (Kent)	7	(4)
2009	Dulwich Hamlet	5	(2)
2010	Cray Wanderers	19	(7)
2010–2012	Caledonia AIA		
2012–2014	Cray Wanderers	5	(1)
2014	Enfield Town		
2014	Brentwood Town		
2015	Heybridge Swifts		

International career^{‡}
2004–2012	Guyana	37	(7)
- * Club domestic league appearances and goals as of 27 September 2012 ‡ National team caps and goals as of 31 December 2012

Shawn Beveney (born 27 March 1982) is a Guyanese footballer who plays for Haringey Borough F.C.

== Career ==
Beveney was voted in the best five players playing non-League football in March 2009 by leading non-league journalists.

Beveney made his competitive debut for Cray Wanderers in their 4–0 Kent Senior Cup defeat to Ebbsfleet United, and scored on his league début against Godalming Town.

After a thigh injury, Beveney was named to the bench on 27 December, against Kingstonian, but did not play. He finally made his return off the bench at home to Dulwich Hamlet, but after the injury, Shawn was released by the club.

Beveney was released by Lewes in late July.

Beveney moving to Ashford Town (Kent) once fully fit. He scored a hat-trick on his début.

Beveney came plays for Dulwich Hamlet He was granted a full British work permit.

After a spell on trial at Grimsby Town, Beveney returned to Cray Wanderers in October 2009 for their first season in the Isthmian League Premier Division. Beveney was signed on a year contract by TT Pro League Caledonia AIA Where Beveney scored 11 goals in 33 games.

Shawn spent part of the 2010–11 season with Billericay Town scoring a single goal for the club which came in a 3–0 win over Hastings United.

Beveney joined Enfield Town in October 2014, before joining Brentwood Town on loan in December 2014. He joined Heybridge Swifts in February 2015.

=== Position ===
He plays striker or central midfield for his country but plays as a striker at club level.

== International career ==
Beveney has captained Guyana national football team 19 times. He returned from international duty on 25 June 2008 after a man of the match performance in a friendly against Trinidad and Tobago.
