= Soesdyke-Linden Highway =

Highway in Guyana

Coordinates: 6.2824°N 58.2133°W

Route information
- Length: 45 mi (72 km)

Location
- Country: Guyana

Highway system
- Transport in Guyana

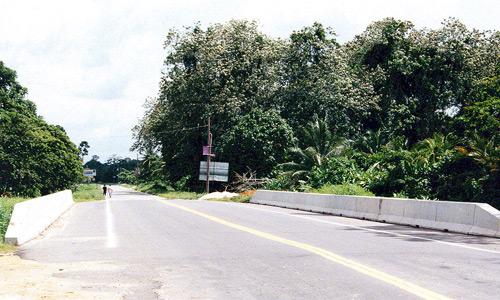
Soesdyke-Linden Highway.

The Soesdyke-Linden Highway is a 45-mile-long (72 km) two-lane highway that runs between Soesdyke and Linden in Guyana. The East Bank Public Road connects Soesdyke with Georgetown.

== Construction ==
The Soesdyke-Linden highway was constructed between 1966 and 1968 by B. B. McCormick & Sons. It cost approximately US$17 million to build. The highway was officially opened in 1969.

== Continuing work ==
The highway was rehabilitated from 1997–1999 with funding from the Caribbean Development Bank. The repair works were carried out by a Trinidadian company called Seereeram Brothers Ltd at a cost of US$6,575,000.

The highway greatly improved development of the town of Linden, which was previously accessed by boat via the Demerara River.

Accidents are common, the highway is unlit and lacks regular maintenance.
