= Luke Gullick =

English footballer

Personal information
- Date of birth: 24 October 1986 (age 40)
- Position: Forward

Team information
- Current team: Cardiff Draconians
- Number: 25

Youth career
- Southampton
- Chippenham Town

Senior career*
Years	Team	Apps	(Gls)
–2006	Biddestone		
2006	Calne Town		
2006–2007	Swindon Supermarine		(1+)
2007-2011	Chippenham Town		
2011–2012	San Juan Jabloteh		
2012	Chippenham Town		
2014–2025	Pontypridd United		
2023–2024	→ Trethomas Bluebirds (loan)		
2025–2026	Caerau Ely	23	(9)
2026–	Cardiff Draconians	7	(4)
- * Club domestic league appearances and goals as of 09:21, 8 November 2026 (UTC)

Luke Gullick (born 24 October 1986) is an English footballer who plays for Cymru South club Cardiff Draconians. Sometimes used as a winger at Chippenham Town, he is able to be put in any position, including defense.

== Trinidad and Tobago ==
Traveling to Trinidad and Tobago in 2009 to trial for San Juan Jabloteh, Gullick harbored ambitions to get called up to the Trinidad and Tobago national team in time for the 2010 FIFA World Cup but they never qualified so he couldn't participate in the event, getting recalled to Chippenham Town following the unsuccessful trial where he performed well upon return.

Earning a six-month deal with San Juan Jabloteh in 2011 and staying with his cousins throughout his spell there, the Englishman notched his first goal in a 4–4 stalemate with T&TEC, claiming that the gameplay there was 'fast and strong'. He then trained with Newport County in Wales before returning to Chippenham Town in 2012.

== Personal life ==
The forward has been a fervid supporter of Chippenham Town since he was 12.

His mother Anne's side of the family hail from Trinidad and his cousin Akeem once directed a professional club there.
