= Elijah Joseph =

Saint Lucian footballer (born 1974)

Personal information
- Date of birth: 9 August 1974 (age 52)
- Position: Defender

Senior career*
Years	Team	Apps	(Gls)
–2013	W Connection		
2017	Northern United		

International career
1996–2012	Saint Lucia	22	(7)
- * Club domestic league appearances and goals

Elijah Joseph (born 9 August 1974) is a Saint Lucian former footballer who played as a defender.

== Life and career ==
Joseph was born on 9 August 1974. He signed for Trinidadian side W Connection. He was a member of the club's first professional squad. He captained them. He played for them in the CONCACAF Champions Cup. He made the most appearances in their history. He was described as "one of the most talented defenders in the TT Pro League at age 37". He was regarded as one of the most prominent defenders in the Caribbean while playing for them.

In 2017, he signed for Saint Lucian side Northern United. He was a Saint Lucia international. He made twenty-two appearances and scored seven goals while playing for the Saint Lucia national football team. He played for the Saint Lucia national football team for 1998 FIFA World Cup qualification, 2002 FIFA World Cup qualification, 2002 CONCACAF Gold Cup qualification, 2003 CONCACAF Gold Cup qualification, 2006 FIFA World Cup qualification, 2005 CONCACAF Gold Cup qualification, and CONCACAF Gold Cup qualification.
