= Leslie Holligan =

Guyanese footballer

Personal information
- Full name: Leslie Holligan
- Date of birth: 3 August 1978
- Place of birth: Georgetown, Guyana
- Date of death: 15 September 2007 (aged 29)
- Place of death: Georgetown, Guyana
- Position: Defender

Youth career
- 1991–1997: Beacon FC

Senior career*
Years	Team	Apps	(Gls)
1998–1999	Beacon FC	30	(3)
2000	Notre Dame SC	25	(7)
2001–2003	FC Georgetown	63	(4)
2003–2005	Camptown Georgetown	74	(3)
2005	Alpha United	8	(0)
2006	North East Stars	28	(1)
2007	Caledonia AIA	13	(1)

International career
2002–2007	Guyana	14	(0)
- * Club domestic league appearances and goals

Leslie Holligan (3 August 1978 – 15 September 2007) was a Guyanese footballer who last played for Caledonia AIA.

== Career ==
He played for Beacon FC, Camptown FC and Alpha United and had stints with Notre Dame of Barbados and Caledonia AIA in the T&T Pro League.

== International career ==
Holligan was a member of the Guyana national football team and played fourteen games. He was a starting member of Guyana's Digicel Cup team 2006 and represented the country since 1991 at U-19, U-21 and U-23 level.

== Death ==
He died on 15 September 2007 at Georgetown Public Hospital and was buried ten days later in Georgetown, Guyana.
