= Andrew Durant (footballer) =

Guyanese footballer

Personal information
- Full name: Andrew Durant
- Date of birth: 2 August 1985 (age 41)
- Place of birth: Georgetown, Guyana
- Position: Goalkeeper

Team information
- Current team: North East Stars
- Number: 1

Youth career
- 1999–2003: Santos Georgetown

Senior career*
Years	Team	Apps	(Gls)
2004–2006	Santos Georgetown	51	(0)
2007	Tobago United	25	(0)
2008–	North East Stars	39	(0)

International career
2004–	Guyana	5	(0)
- * Club domestic league appearances and goals

Andrew Durant (born August 2, 1985) is a footballer who is currently playing for TT Pro League team North East Stars.

== International career ==
Durant is member of the Guyana national football team.
