= Glenton Wolfe =

Trinidadian professional footballer (born 1981)

Personal information
- Date of birth: 30 December 1981 (age 44)
- Place of birth: Manzanilla, Trinidad and Tobago
- Height: 1.79 m (5 ft 10 1/2 in)
- Position: Defender

Team information
- Current team: Sporting Goa

Senior career*
| Years | Team | Apps | (Gls) |
| 2001–2005 | North East Stars | | |
| 2006 | San Juan Jabloteh | | |
| 2007–2008 | North East Stars | | |
| 2009 | W Connection | | |
| 2009 | San Juan Jabloteh | | |
| 2010–2014 | North East Stars | | |
| 2014 | Churchill Brothers | | |
| 2014–2015 | Sporting Goa | 0 | (0) |

International career^{‡}
| 2005–2007 | Trinidad and Tobago | 5 | (0) |
- * Club domestic league appearances and goals as of 17 December 2014 ‡ National team caps and goals as of 17 December 2014

Glenton Wolfe (born 30 December 1981) is a Trinidadian professional footballer who played as a defender. He last appeared with Indian I-League club Sporting Clube de Goa.

== Career ==
=== TT Pro League ===
Wolfe started his career with North East Stars of the TT Pro League, before moving to San Juan Jabloteh. He soon returned to North East Stars before signing for San Juan again and then W Connection. He then moved back to North East Stars, where he stayed till 2014.

=== India ===
In 2014, Wolfe moved to India to sign for Churchill Brothers S.C. of the I-League, and also the club of his brother, Anthony Wolfe. Shortly after Churchill Brothers were relegated, Wolfe signed for rivals Sporting Clube de Goa.

== International ==
Making his debut on 25 May 2005, Wolfe has 5 caps for the Trinidad and Tobago national football team.
