= 2011 Puerto Rico Islanders season =

Puerto Rico Islanders
2011 season
- President: Andy Guillermard
- Head coach: Colin Clarke
- Stadium: Juan Ramón Loubriel Stadium
- NASL: 2nd
- NASL Playoffs: Semi-final
- CFU Club Championship: Champions
- CONCACAF Champions League: Preliminary round
- Top goalscorer: League: Jonathan Faña (12); All: Jonathan Faña (16)
- Highest home attendance: League: 3,721 vs Carolina Railhawks (August 13, 2011); All: 3,721 vs Carolina Railhawks (August 13, 2011)
- Lowest home attendance: League: 1,182 vs Atlanta Silverbacks (August 10, 2011); All: 500 vs Walking Bout Company (May 14, 2011)
- Average home league attendance: 2,161
Home colors	Away colors

The 2011 season is the Puerto Rico Islanders 8th season over all and their 1st season in the North American Soccer League. This article shows player statistics and all matches that the club have and will play during the 2011 season.

== Club ==
=== Technical staff ===
Position	Staff
Head Coach	(Northern Ireland) Colin Clarke
Assistant Coach	(England) Adrian Whitbread
Goalkeeping Coach	(United States) Jack Stefanowski
Team Doctor	(Puerto Rico) Dr. Magdiel Mayol
Head Athletic Trainer	(Puerto Rico) Christian Cotto

Last updated: April 9, 2011
Source: PR Islanders

=== Kit ===
Supplier: Umbro
Sponsor(s): Toyota

Source: Puerto Rico Islanders

== Squad ==
=== First Team squad ===
As of September 13, 2011.

No.	Name	Nationality	Position (s)	Date of birth (age)	Previous club
Goalkeepers
1	Ray Burse	(United States)	GK	October 2, 1984 (age 41)	(United States) Columbus Crew
23	Cody Laurendi	(Puerto Rico)	GK	August 15, 1988 (age 38)	(Belgium) R.R.F.C. Montegnée
15	Richard Martin	(England)	GK	September 1, 1987 (age 38)	(England) Yeovil Town F.C.
Defenders
25	Jamie Cunningham	(United States)	CB	March 9, 1987 (age 39)	(United States) Fort Lewis College
21	Logan Emory	(Puerto Rico)	CB	January 10, 1988 (age 38)	(United States) Portland Pilots
2	Scott Jones	(Puerto Rico)	LB	September 22, 1983 (age 42)	(United States) FC Dallas
3	Richard Martinez	(Puerto Rico)	RWB / CB	April 2, 1988 (age 38)	(United States) Hofstra University
33	Jay Needham	(United States)	CB / RB	September 20, 1984 (age 41)	(United States) Austin Aztex FC
6	Alexis Rivera	(Puerto Rico)	FB / WM	October 29, 1982 (age 43)	(Puerto Rico) Atlético de San Juan FC
4	Marco Vélez	(Puerto Rico)	CB	June 26, 1982 (age 44)	(Canada) Toronto FC
19	Kevon Villaroel	(Trinidad and Tobago)	LB /WM	December 17, 1987 (age 38)	(Trinidad and Tobago) San Juan Jabloteh
Midfielders
5	Noah Delgado (C)	(Puerto Rico)	MF	December 30, 1979 (age 46)	(United States) Rochester Rhinos
20	Josh Hansen	(Puerto Rico)	AM / FW	January 16, 1982 (age 44)	(Canada) Vancouver Whitecaps (1986–2010)
28	Leonardo Ly	(Costa Rica)	DM	March 14, 1985 (age 41)	(Costa Rica) Barrio México
8	Aaron Pitchkolan	(United States)	DM / CB	March 14, 1983 (age 43)	(United States) Rochester Rhinos
16	Joe Salem	(United States)	MF	January 30, 1987 (age 39)	(United States) Tulsa Golden Hurricane
13	Junior Sandoval	(Honduras)	MF	October 13, 1990 (age 35)	(United States) Atlanta Silverbacks Reserves
18	Osei Telesford	(Trinidad and Tobago)	DM	November 30, 1983 (age 42)	(United States) Chicago Fire
14	Jarad Van Schaik	(United States)	MF	December 11, 1988 (age 37)	(United States) Portland Pilots
10	Petter Villegas	(Puerto Rico)	MF	November 15, 1975 (age 50)	River Plate Puerto Rico
17	Tyler Wilson	(Puerto Rico)	MF	May 26, 1989 (age 37)	(United States) UC Riverside
Forwards
11	Nicholas Addlery	(Jamaica)	CF	December 7, 1981 (age 44)	(Canada) Vancouver Whitecaps (1986–2010)
	Steven Beattie	(Republic of Ireland)	FW	August 20, 1988 (age 38)	(United States) NKU
12	Matthew Bouraee	(United States)	FW	July 29, 1988 (age 38)	(United States) New York Red Bull NPSL
9	Jonathan Faña	(Dominican Republic)	CF	April 11, 1987 (age 39)	(Trinidad and Tobago) W Connection
7	David Foley	(Puerto Rico)	CF	July 12, 1987 (age 39)	(England) Hartlepool United F.C.
29	Yaikel Pérez	(Cuba)	FW	February 17, 1985 (age 41)	River Plate Puerto Rico
24	Héctor Ramos	(Puerto Rico)	FW	June 4, 1990 (age 36)	(Puerto Rico) Criollos de Caguas FC
22	Gregory Richardson	(Guyana)	FW	June 16, 1982 (age 44)	(United States) Carolina Railhawks

== Transfers ==
=== In ===
Date	Player	Position	Previous club	Fee/notes	Ref
February 2, 2011	(United States) Jay Needham	DF	(United States) Austin Aztex FC	Free agent	
February 9, 2011	(United States) Matthew Bouraee	FW	(United States) New York Red Bull NPSL	Free agent	
February 25, 2011	(United States) Aaron Pitchkolan	DF	(United States) Rochester Rhinos	Undisclosed	
March 22, 2011	(Republic of Ireland) Steven Beattie	FW	(United States) NKU	Free agent	
March 22, 2011	(Puerto Rico) Tyler Wilson	MF	(United States) UC Riverside	Free agent	
March 29, 2011	(United States) Ray Burse	GK	(United States) Columbus Crew	Free agent	
March 31, 2011	(United States) Jamie Cunningham	DF	(United States) Fort Lewis College	Free agent	
April 1, 2011	(Costa Rica) Leonardo Ly	MF	(Costa Rica) Barrio México	Free agent	
April 6, 2011	(England) Richard Martin	GK	(England) Yeovil Town F.C.	Free agent	
April 6, 2011	(United States) Jarad Van Schaik	MF	(United States) Portland Pilots	Free agent	
April 15, 2011	(Guyana) Gregory Richardson	FW	(United States) Carolina Railhawks	Free agent	
June 3, 2011	(Cuba) Yaikel Pérez	FW	River Plate Puerto Rico	Free agent	
June 3, 2011	(Puerto Rico) Petter Villegas	MF	River Plate Puerto Rico	Free agent	
August 1, 2011	(United States) Cody Laurendi	GK	Sevilla FC Puerto Rico	Loan return	
August 1, 2011	(Puerto Rico) Tyler Wilson	MF	Sevilla FC Puerto Rico	Loan return	
August 12, 2011	(Honduras) Junior Sandoval	MF	(United States) Atlanta Silverbacks	Loan return	
September 13, 2011	(Puerto Rico) Héctor Ramos	FW	(Puerto Rico) Criollos de Caguas FC	Loan	

=== Out ===
Date	Player	Position	Destination club	Fee/notes	Ref
October 31, 2010	(United States) David Horst	DF	(United States) Real Salt Lake	Loan return	
December 12, 2010	(Liberia) Anthony Allison	FW	Free agent	Waived	
December 12, 2010	(Trinidad and Tobago) Nigel Henry	DF	Retired	Retired	
February 16, 2011	(Trinidad and Tobago) Kendall Jagdeosingh	FW	(United States) Rochester Rhinos	Free agent	
February 19, 2011	(United States) Bill Gaudette	GK	(Canada) Montreal Impact	Free agent	
March 7, 2011	(Guyana) Chris Nurse	MF	(United States) Carolina Railhawks	Free agent	
March 15, 2011	(Sierra Leone) Shaka Bangura	MF	(United States) Richmond Kickers	Free agent	
March 15, 2011	(Liberia) Sandy Gbandi	MF	(United States) NSC Minnesota Stars	Free agent	
March 18, 2011	(Trinidad and Tobago) Keon Daniel	MF	(United States) Philadelphia Union	Free agent	
April 1, 2011	(Honduras) Junior Sandoval	MF	(United States) Atlanta Silverbacks	Loan	
April 7, 2011	(El Salvador) Edwin Miranda	MF	(United States) Los Angeles Blues	Free agent	
July 13, 2011	(United States) Cody Laurendi	GK	Sevilla FC Puerto Rico	Loan	
July 13, 2011	(Puerto Rico) Tyler Wilson	MF	Sevilla FC Puerto Rico	Loan	

== Match results ==
=== North American Soccer League ===
April 9, 2011 1	Carolina RailHawks	1–2	Puerto Rico Islanders	Cary
19:00 EDT	Krause (yellow card) 15'; Steele (red card) 58'; Barbara 86' (pen.)	Report	Hansen 32'; Jones (yellow card) 52'; Addlery (yellow card) 61'; Emory (yellow card) 74'; Needham 90+4'	Stadium: WakeMed Soccer Park; Attendance: 1,502

April 17, 2011 2	FC Tampa Bay	0–2	Puerto Rico Islanders	St. Petersburg
18:00 EDT	Sanfilippo (yellow card) 67'	Report	Pitchkolan (yellow card) 31'; Faña 35', 79'	Stadium: Al Lang Stadium; Attendance: 2,913

April 26, 2011 3	Puerto Rico Islanders	3–1	NSC Minnesota Stars	Bayamón
20:05 EDT	Addlery 34'; Faña 39', 77'; Salem (yellow card) 71'	Report	Gotsmanov (yellow card) 19'; Altman 21'; Rodríguez (yellow card) 48'	Stadium: Juan Ramón Loubriel Stadium; Attendance: 2,682

April 29, 2011 4	Puerto Rico Islanders	2–2	Fort Lauderdale Strikers	Bayamón
20:05 EDT	Needham (red card) 36'; Addlery (yellow card) 38' (goal) 75'; Richardson 90'	Report	Wheeler (yellow card) 37'; Coudet 41' (pen.); Le Petit (yellow card) 49'; Laing (yellow card) 61'; Gordon 89'	Stadium: Juan Ramón Loubriel Stadium; Attendance: 2,692

May 18, 2011 5	NSC Minnesota Stars	2–0	Puerto Rico Islanders	Blaine
19:30 EDT	Davis 62'; Deldo 73'	Report	Cunningham (yellow card) 65'; Salem (yellow card) 85'; Faña (yellow card) 90'	Stadium: National Sports Center; Attendance: 1,030

May 21, 2011 6	Carolina RailHawks	3–0	Puerto Rico Islanders	Cary
19:00 EDT	Krause (yellow card) 6'; Barbara 26', 53'; McKenny (yellow card) 66'; Campos 67'; Low (yellow card) 78'	Report	Delgado (yellow card) 58'; Pitchkolan (yellow card) 67'	Stadium: WakeMed Soccer Park; Attendance: 3,498

June 1, 2011 7	Puerto Rico Islanders	1–1	NSC Minnesota Stars	Bayamón
19:30 EDT	Addlery 39'; Pitchkolan (yellow card) 79'; Foley (yellow card) 87'	Report	Rodríguez (yellow card) 29'; Altman (yellow card) 43'; Cosgriff (yellow card) 64'; Bracalello 69'; Cristiano (yellow card) 90'	Stadium: Juan Ramón Loubriel Stadium; Attendance: 1,607

June 4, 2011 8	Fort Lauderdale Strikers	3–2	Puerto Rico Islanders	Fort Lauderdale
19:30 EDT	Thompson 11'; Granado (yellow card) 18'; Arrieta (yellow card) 26' (goal) 81'; Coudet (yellow card) 68'; Hohlbein (yellow card) 86'; Peguero 88'	Report	Delgado (red card) 38'; Addlery 64'; Faña 67'; Villaroel (yellow card) 80'	Stadium: Lockhart Stadium; Attendance: 3,218

June 12, 2011 9	Puerto Rico Islanders	2–1	Montréal Impact	Bayamón
18:05 EDT	Addlery (yellow card) 20' (goal) 37'; Pitchkolan 23'; Cunningham (yellow card) 81'; Burse (yellow card) 86'	Report	Lowery 35'; Tsiskaridze (yellow card) 45'; Testo (yellow card) 53'	Stadium: Juan Ramón Loubriel Stadium; Attendance: 1,667

June 15, 2011 10	FC Edmonton	3–0	Puerto Rico Islanders	Edmonton
21:30 EDT	Chin 9'; Antoniuk 35'; Saiko 57'	Report		Stadium: Foote Field; Attendance: 797

June 19, 2011 11	Puerto Rico Islanders	3–1	Atlanta Silverbacks	Bayamón
21:30 EDT	Faña 1'; Emory (yellow card) 26'; Perez (yellow card) 41'; Hansen 80'; Cunningham (yellow card) 85'; Foley 90'	Report	Davis (yellow card) 11'; Paulini 45' (pen.) (red card) 87'; Hunt (yellow card) 65'; O'Brien (yellow card) 82'	Stadium: Juan Ramón Loubriel Stadium; Attendance: 1,377

June 25, 2011 12	Fort Lauderdale Strikers	1–1	Puerto Rico Islanders	Fort Lauderdale
19:30 EDT	Nuñez 75'; Coudet (yellow card) 78'	Report	Faña 65'; Villegas (yellow card) 90'	Stadium: Lockhart Stadium; Attendance: 3,628

June 29, 2011 13	Montréal Impact	0–0	Puerto Rico Islanders	Montreal
19:30 EDT		Report		Stadium: Saputo Stadium

July 4, 2011 14	Atlanta Silverbacks	3–4	Puerto Rico Islanders	Chamblee
17:00 EDT	O'Brien 32' (pen.) 54' (pen.); Sandoval 59'	Report	Pitchkolan 27'; Bouraee 38'; Foley 65' (pen.); Faña 90'	Stadium: Atlanta Silverbacks Park

July 9, 2011 15	Puerto Rico Islanders	1–1	FC Tampa Bay	Bayamón
20:05 EDT	Cunningham (yellow card) 70'; Foley 82'	Report	King 18'; Millien (yellow card) 61' (yellow-red card) 71'	Stadium: Juan Ramón Loubriel Stadium; Attendance: 2,007

July 17, 2011 16	NSC Minnesota Stars	0–1	Puerto Rico Islanders	Blaine
20:30 EDT		Report	vanSchaik 75'	Stadium: National Sports Center; Attendance: 1,625

July 20, 2011 17	Puerto Rico Islanders	3–1	Fort Lauderdale Strikers	Bayamón
20:05 EDT	vanSchaik 45' (yellow card) 45'; Emory (yellow card) 55'; Foley 73' (pen.); Delgado 75'; Pitchkolan (yellow card) 80'; Burse (yellow card) 88'	Report	vanSchaik 17' (o.g.); West (yellow card) 35'; Coudet (red card) 73'	Stadium: Juan Ramón Loubriel Stadium; Attendance: 1,855

July 31, 2011 18	Montréal Impact	1–0	Puerto Rico Islanders	Montreal
14:30 EDT	Camara (yellow card) 26'; Lowery (yellow card) 37'; Sebrango 74'	Report	Rivera (yellow card) 44'; Perez (red card) 65'	Stadium: Saputo Stadium; Attendance: 12,165

August 6, 2011 19	FC Edmonton	0–1	Puerto Rico Islanders	Edmonton
21:30 EDT	Lemire (yellow card) 11'; Saiko (yellow card) 90'	Report	Emory (yellow card) 11'; Faña (yellow card) 34'; Pitchkolan 90'	Stadium: Foote Field; Attendance: 1,480

August 10, 2011 20	Puerto Rico Islanders	2–0	Atlanta Silverbacks	Bayamón
19:30 EDT	Foley (yellow card) 19' (goal) 26'; Emory (yellow card) 63'; Villaroel 66'	Report	Schnorf (yellow card) 48'	Stadium: Juan Ramón Loubriel Stadium; Attendance: 1,182

August 13, 2011 21	Puerto Rico Islanders	2–0	Carolina RailHawks	Bayamón
19:30 EDT	Foley 37' (pen.); Faña (yellow card) 45'; Villegas 86'	Report	Krause (yellow card) 36'; Steele (yellow card) 52'; Miller (yellow card) 90'	Stadium: Juan Ramón Loubriel Stadium; Attendance: 3,721

August 20, 2011 22	FC Tampa Bay	1–2	Puerto Rico Islanders	St. Petersburg
19:00 EDT	Ambersley 30'; Savage (yellow card) 78'	Report	Cunningham (yellow card) 2'; Addlery 33'; Telesford (yellow card) 36'; Foley 75'	Stadium: Al Lang Stadium; Attendance: 2,965

August 27, 2011 23	Puerto Rico Islanders	3–2	FC Edmonton	Bayamón
19:30 EDT	Addlery 40'; Faña (yellow card) 43'; Needham (yellow card) 50' (goal) 90+2'	Report	Saiko 28'; Duberry (yellow card) 53'; Hamilton (yellow card) 79'; Porter 90'	Stadium: Juan Ramón Loubriel Stadium; Attendance: 2,702

August 30, 2011 23	Puerto Rico Islanders	1–1	FC Edmonton	Bayamón
19:30 EDT	Cox 47' van Leerdam (yellow card) 76'; Hamilton (yellow card) 89'	Report	Telesford (yellow card) 14' (yellow-red card) 54'; Faña 52'	Stadium: Juan Ramón Loubriel Stadium

September 3, 2011 25	Atlanta Silverbacks	2–0	Puerto Rico Islanders	Atlanta
7:30 PM ET	Matt Horth 28', 30'	Report A Report B		Stadium: Atlanta Silverbacks Park

September 7, 2011 26	Puerto Rico Islanders	1–1	Montreal Impact	Bayamón
	Logan Emory (red card) 29'; Jay Needham (yellow card) 87'; Jonathan Fana 90', (yellow card) 90'	Report	Miguel Montaño (yellow card) 15'; Ian Westlake (yellow card) 17'; Leonardo Di Lorenzo (yellow card) 53'; Ryan Pore 88'; Hassoun Camara (yellow card) 90'; Evan Bush (yellow card) 90'; Nevio Pizzolitto (yellow card) 90'	Stadium: Juan Ramón Loubriel Stadium; Attendance: 1,022; Referee: Javier Santos

September 17, 2011 27	Puerto Rico Islanders	1–0	Carolina RailHawks	Bayamón
	Villegas 57'	Report		Stadium: Juan Ramón Loubriel Stadium

September 21, 2011 28	Puerto Rico Islanders	1–0	FC Tampa Bay	Bayamón
7:30 PM EDT	Perez 5'	(Report)	Rodrigues (yellow card) 62'	Stadium: Juan Ramón Loubriel Stadium; Attendance: 1,502
Note: Rescheduled from September 10.

=== CFU Club championship ===
May 7, 2011 R2	Walking Bout Company (Suriname)	1–1	Puerto Rico Islanders	Paramaribo
19:00 EDT	Sandvliet 48'; Franilson (yellow card) 78'	Report	Cunningham 90'	Stadium: Kamperveen Stadion

May 14, 2011 R2	Puerto Rico Islanders	7–0 (8–1 agg.)	(Suriname) Walking Bout Company	Bayamón
20:00 EDT	Delgado 5', 9'; Pitchkolan 23'; Pitchkolan (yellow card) 30'; Foley 37'; Bouraee 44'; Faña 57'; Salem 88' (pen.)	Report	Koenders (yellow card) 44'; Aroepa (yellow card) 51'; Sastromedjo (red card) 83'	Stadium: Juan Ramón Loubriel Stadium; Attendance: 500

May 25, 2011 SF	Alpha United (Guyana)	1–3	Puerto Rico Islanders	Georgetown
20:00 EDT	Jacobs 37'; Mitchell (yellow card) 55'	Report	Bouraee 23'; Telesford (yellow card) 95'; Faña 108'; Foley 116'	Stadium: Providence Stadium; Attendance: 1,500

May 27, 2011 F	Tempête (Haiti)	1–3	Puerto Rico Islanders	Georgetown
20:30 EDT	Charles 42' (pen.); Francoeur (yellow card) 60'; Romondt (red card) 66'	Report	Needham 22'; Villaroel (red card) 40'; Pitchkolan (yellow card) 78'; Telesford (yellow card) 90'; Faña 99', 112'	Stadium: Providence Stadium

CFU Club Championship
2011 winners

Puerto Rico Islanders
Second title

=== CONCACAF Champions League ===
July 27, 2011 PR	Isidro Metapán (El Salvador)	2–0	Puerto Rico Islanders	Metapán
20:00 EDT	E. Sánchez 65'; Allan Kardeck 87'	Report		Stadium: Estadio Jorge Calero Suárez; Attendance: 1,658; Referee: Jafeth Perea (Panama)

August 3, 2011 PR	Puerto Rico Islanders	3–1 (3–3 a agg.)	(El Salvador) Isidro Metapán	Bayamón
20:00 EDT	Foley 60' (pen.), 68' (pen.); Richardson 90+5'	Report	Blanco 56'	Stadium: Juan Ramón Loubriel Stadium; Referee: Valdin Legister (Jamaica)

== Standings ==
Pos	Team	Pld	W	D	L	GF	GA	GD	Pts	Qualification
1	Carolina RailHawks (X)	28	17	3	8	50	26	+24	54	Playoff semifinals
2	Puerto Rico Islanders	28	15	7	6	41	32	+9	52	Playoff semifinals
3	Tampa Bay Rowdies	28	11	8	9	41	36	+5	41	Playoff quarterfinals
4	Fort Lauderdale Strikers	28	9	11	8	35	36	−1	38	Playoff quarterfinals
5	FC Edmonton	28	10	6	12	35	40	−5	36 (Note: EDM: 8 pts; MIN: 2 pts)	Playoff quarterfinals

Source: NASL Standings
Rules for classification: 1) points; 2) head-to-head record; 3) goal difference; 4) number of goals scored.
(X) Regular season champion
