= 2012 Puerto Rico Islanders season =

Puerto Rico Islanders
2012 season
- President: Andy Guillermard
- Head coach: Adrian Whitbread
- Stadium: Estadio Juan Ramón Loubriel
- NASL: 3rd Place
- NASL Playoffs: TBD
- CFU Club Championship: 3rd Place
- CONCACAF Champions League: Group stage
- Top goalscorer: League: Nicholas Addlery (9); All: Nicholas Addlery (10)
- Highest home attendance: 7,192 vs Fort Lauderdale Strikers (August 18, 2012)
- Lowest home attendance: 520 vs FC Edmonton (April 18, 2012)
| Home colors | Away colors | Third colors |

The 2012 season was the Puerto Rico Islanders ninth season over all and their second season in the North American Soccer League. This article shows player statistics and all matches that the club have and will play during the 2012 season.

== Club ==
=== Technical Staff ===
| Position | Staff |
|---|---|
| Head Coach | (England) Adrian Whitbread |
| Assistant Coach | (United States) Jack Stefanowski |
| Goalkeeping Coach | (United States) Jack Stefanowski |
| Team Doctor | (Puerto Rico) Dr. Magdiel Mayol |
| Head Athletic Trainer | (Puerto Rico) Christian Cotto |

Last updated: April 9, 2011
Source: PR Islanders

=== Kit ===
Supplier: Admiral
Sponsor(s): Toyota

Source: Puerto Rico Islanders

== Squad ==
=== First Team Squad ===
As of September 16, 2012.

| No. | Name | Nationality | Position (s) | Date of birth (age) | Previous club |
Goalkeepers
| 1 | Richard Martin | (Puerto Rico) | GK | September 1, 1987 (age 39) | (England) Yeovil Town F.C. |
| 23 | Cody Laurendi | (United States) | GK | August 15, 1988 (age 38) | (Belgium) R.R.F.C. Montegnée |
Defenders
| 2 | Jamie Cunningham | (United States) | CB | March 9, 1987 (age 39) | (United States) Fort Lewis College |
| 32 | Pari Pantazopoulos | (United States) | CB | September 17, 1988 (age 38) | (United States) Chicago Fire |
| 12 | Edson Edward | (Canada) | CB | September 20, 1988 (age 38) | (United States) FC Dallas |
| 3 | Richard Martinez | (Puerto Rico) | RWB / CB | April 2, 1988 (age 38) | (United States) Hofstra University |
| 33 | Jay Needham | (United States) | CB / RB | September 20, 1984 (age 42) | (United States) Austin Aztex FC |
| 6 | Alexis Rivera | (Puerto Rico) | FB / WM | October 29, 1982 (age 44) | (Puerto Rico) Atlético de San Juan FC |
| 4 | Marco Vélez | (Puerto Rico) | CB | June 26, 1982 (age 44) | (Canada) Toronto FC |
| 16 | Anthony Vázquez | (Puerto Rico) | CB | July 29, 1988 (age 38) | (United States) Monmouth Hawks |
| 25 | Christian Ibeagha | (Nigeria) | CB | January 10, 1990 (age 36) | (United States) Carolina Dynamo |
| 29 | Caleb Norkus | (United States) | CB | March 14, 1979 (age 47) | (United States) Carolina RailHawks |
| 22 | César García | (Dominican Republic) | CB | March 13, 1993 (age 33) | |
Midfielders
| 5 | Noah Delgado (C) | (Puerto Rico) | MF | December 30, 1979 (age 46) | (United States) Rochester Rhinos |
| 20 | Josh Hansen | (Puerto Rico) | AM / FW | January 16, 1982 (age 44) | (Canada) Vancouver Whitecaps (1986–2010) |
| 15 | Andrés Pérez | (Puerto Rico) | MF | April 10, 1988 (age 38) | Sevilla FC Puerto Rico |
| 21 | Stephen deRoux | (Jamaica) | MF | December 13, 1983 (age 42) | (United States) Montreal Impact |
| 24 | Justin Fojo | (Trinidad and Tobago) | MF | December 7, 1987 (age 38) | (United States) Orlando City |
| 28 | Yaw Danso | (Ghana) | MF | June 15, 1989 (age 37) | (United States) St. Louis Lions |
| 18 | Osei Telesford | (Trinidad and Tobago) | DM | November 30, 1983 (age 42) | (United States) Chicago Fire |
| 14 | Jarad Van Schaik | (United States) | MF | December 11, 1988 (age 37) | (United States) Portland Pilots |
| 30 | Chris Nurse | (Guyana) | MF | May 7, 1984 (age 42) | (United States) Carolina RailHawks |
| 17 | Tyler Wilson | (Puerto Rico) | MF | May 26, 1989 (age 37) | (United States) UC Riverside |
Forwards
| 11 | Nicholas Addlery | (Jamaica) | CF | December 7, 1981 (age 44) | (Canada) Vancouver Whitecaps (1986–2010) |
| 8 | Joseph Marrero | (Puerto Rico) | FW | April 9, 1993 (age 33) | (Puerto Rico) Conquistadores de Guaynabo |
| 27 | Christian Barreiro | (Puerto Rico) | FW | December 14, 1990 (age 35) | |
| 9 | Jonathan Faña | (Dominican Republic) | CF | April 11, 1987 (age 39) | (Trinidad and Tobago) W Connection |
| 7 | David Foley | (Puerto Rico) | CF | July 12, 1987 (age 39) | (England) Hartlepool United F.C. |
| 24 | Héctor Ramos | (Puerto Rico) | FW | June 4, 1990 (age 36) | (Puerto Rico) Criollos de Caguas FC |
| 22 | Gregory Richardson | (Guyana) | FW | June 16, 1982 (age 44) | (United States) Carolina Railhawks |

== Transfers ==
=== In ===
| Date | Player | Position | Previous club | Fee/notes | Ref |

=== Out ===
| Date | Player | Position | Destination club | Fee/notes | Ref |

== Match results ==
| Pos | Team | Pld | W | D | L | GF | GA | GD | Pts | Qualification |
|---|---|---|---|---|---|---|---|---|---|---|
| 1 | San Antonio Scorpions (X) | 28 | 13 | 8 | 7 | 46 | 27 | +19 | 47 | Playoff semifinals |
| 2 | Tampa Bay Rowdies (C) | 28 | 12 | 9 | 7 | 37 | 30 | +7 | 45 | Playoff semifinals |
| 3 | Puerto Rico Islanders | 28 | 11 | 8 | 9 | 32 | 30 | +2 | 41 | Playoff quarterfinals |
| 4 | Carolina RailHawks | 28 | 10 | 10 | 8 | 44 | 46 | −2 | 40 | Playoff quarterfinals |
| 5 | Fort Lauderdale Strikers | 28 | 9 | 9 | 10 | 40 | 46 | −6 | 36 | Playoff quarterfinals |

Source: NASL Standings
Rules for classification: 1) points; 2) goal difference; 3) number of goals scored.
(C) Champions; (X) Commissioner's Cup (regular season champion)

=== North American Soccer League ===
| 7 April 2012 Match 1 | Puerto Rico Islanders | 1–0 | Tampa Bay Rowdies | Bayamón, Puerto Rico |
| 19:30 | Addlery (yellow card) 21' (goal) 69'; Delgado (yellow card) 25'; Fojo (yellow card) 43'; Cunningham (red card) 59' | Summary | Hill (yellow card) 45'; Yamada (yellow card) 68'; Sanfilippo (yellow card) 90' | Stadium: Bayamón Soccer Complex; Attendance: 952; Referee: Javier Santos |

| 15 April 2012 Match 2 | San Antonio Scorpions | 0–4 | Puerto Rico Islanders | San Antonio, Texas |
| 18:00 | | Summary | Faña 8', 73'; Foley 20'; Addlery 56' | Stadium: Heroes Stadium; Attendance: 13,151; Referee: Jasen Anno |

| 18 April 2012 Match 3 | Puerto Rico Islanders | 0–0 | FC Edmonton | Bayamón, Puerto Rico |
| 19:30 | Foley (yellow card) 38'; Faña (yellow card) 59' | Summary | Saiko (yellow card) 67'; Hatchi (yellow card) 90+3' | Stadium: Bayamón Soccer Complex; Attendance: 520 |

| 21 April 2012 Match 4 | Puerto Rico Islanders | 3–1 | Carolina RailHawks | Bayamón, Puerto Rico |
| 19:30 | Foley 29' (pen.); Martinez 32'; Addlery 57'; Delgado (yellow card) 60'; Edward (yellow card) 76' | Summary | Krause (yellow card) 24'; Low (yellow card) 43'; Needham 51' (o.g.) | Stadium: Bayamón Soccer Complex; Attendance: 1,542 |

| 25 April 2012 Match 5 | Fort Lauderdale Strikers | 3–2 | Puerto Rico Islanders | Fort Lauderdale, Florida |
| 19:30 | Hassan 35', 47', 83'; Laing (yellow card) 60' | Summary | Cunningham (yellow card) 38'; Addlery (yellow card) 41'; Needham 50' (yellow card) 90'; Foley 61' vanSchaik (yellow card) 66' | Stadium: Lockhart Stadium; Attendance: 2,754 |

| 12 May 2012 Match 6 | Puerto Rico Islanders | 2–0 | Fort Lauderdale Strikers | Bayamón, Puerto Rico |
| 19:30 | Martinez (yellow card) 30'; Foley 45'; Ramos 51'; Hansen (yellow card) 89' | Summary | Restrepo (yellow card) 20'; Lorenz (yellow card) 71' | Stadium: Bayamón Soccer Complex; Attendance: 1,060 |

| 16 May 2012 Match 7 | Puerto Rico Islanders | 3–0 | Atlanta Silverbacks | Bayamón, Puerto Rico |
| 19:30 | Foley (yellow card) 19' (goal) 53'; Faña (yellow card) 36'; Ramos 78'; Wilson 88' | Summary | McManus (yellow card) 30'; Navia (yellow card) 40'; Lancaster (red card) 52' | Stadium: Bayamón Soccer Complex; Attendance: 1,000 |

| 19 May 2012 Match 8 | Carolina RailHawks | 1–1 | Puerto Rico Islanders | Cary, North Carolina |
| 19:00 | Shriver 49'; Elenio (yellow card) 57' | Summary | Faña 33'; Edward (yellow card) 89' | Stadium: WakeMed Soccer Park; Attendance: 3,020 |

| 2 June 2012 Match 9 | Carolina RailHawks | 2–1 | Puerto Rico Islanders | Cary, North Carolina |
| 19:00 | Agbossoumonde (red card) 37'; Needham 51' (o.g.); Elenio (yellow card) 54'; Oritiz (yellow card) 63'; Shipalane 88' | Summary | Edward (yellow card) 50'; Faña (yellow card) 69'; Needham 79'; Fojo (yellow card) 89'; Vélez (yellow card) 90' | Stadium: WakeMed Soccer Park; Attendance: 3,568 |

| 9 June 2012 Match 10 | Puerto Rico Islanders | 2–0 | Tampa Bay Rowdies | Bayamón, Puerto Rico |
| 19:30 | Fojo (yellow card) 40'; Rivera (yellow card) 73'; Needham 81' vanSchaik 90+4' | Summary | Picault (yellow card) 30'; Arango (yellow card) 51' | Stadium: Bayamón Soccer Complex; Attendance: 1,012 |

| 16 June 2012 Match 11 | Puerto Rico Islanders | 0–2 | San Antonio Scorpions | Bayamón, Puerto Rico |
| 19:30 | Edward (yellow card) 45+1' (yellow-red card) 90'; Faña (yellow card) 67' | Summary | Ramírez (yellow card) 17' (yellow-red card) 42'; Wagner (yellow card) 23'; Bayona 39'; Pablo Campos 70'; Pitchkolan (yellow card) 79'; Sattler (yellow card) 84'; Denissen (yellow card) 84' | Stadium: Bayamón Soccer Complex; Attendance: 1,551 |

| 23 June 2012 Match 12 | Atlanta Silverbacks | 1–2 | Puerto Rico Islanders | Atlanta |
| 19:30 | Horth 35'; Lancaster (yellow card) 57' | Summary | Addlery 15', 70'; Van Schaik (yellow card) 20'; Telesford (yellow card) 90' | Stadium: Atlanta Silverbacks Park; Attendance: 5,000; Referee: Robert Sibiga |

| 1 July 2012 Match 13 | FC Edmonton | 0–0 | Puerto Rico Islanders | Edmonton, Alberta |
| 16:00 | van Leerdam (yellow card) 22'; Hatchi (yellow card) 37' (yellow-red card) 58'; Rago (yellow card) 64' | Summary | Addlery (yellow card) 45'; Hansen (yellow card) 75' | Stadium: Clarke Stadium; Attendance: 1,474; Referee: Alain Ruch |

| 5 July 2012 Match 13 | Minnesota United | 4–0 | Puerto Rico Islanders | Blaine, Minnesota |
| | Núñez 18', 55'; Bracalello 45'; Walker 81' | Summary | | Stadium: National Sports Center; Attendance: 2,199 |

=== CFU Club Championship ===
==== Group 4 ====
Matches played at the Cayman Islands (host club: George Town).

| Team | Pld | W | D | L | GF | GA | GD | Pts |
|---|---|---|---|---|---|---|---|---|
| Puerto Rico Islanders | 2 | 1 | 1 | 0 | 8 | 0 | +8 | 4 |
| (Trinidad and Tobago) Caledonia AIA | 2 | 1 | 1 | 0 | 5 | 0 | +5 | 4 |
| (Cayman Islands) George Town SC | 2 | 0 | 0 | 2 | 0 | 13 | −13 | 0 |

- (Haiti) Baltimore withdrew due to being unable to obtain visas to enter the Cayman Islands.
May 21, 2012
19:30 UTC−05:00

| Puerto Rico Islanders | 0–0 | (Trinidad and Tobago) Caledonia AIA |
|---|---|---|
| Van Schaik (yellow card) 32' | Report | Joseph (yellow card) 37'; Jorsling (yellow card) 46' |

T.E. McField Sports Centre, George Town
Attendance: 100
Referee: Raymond Bogle (Jamaica)

May 25, 2012
19:30 UTC−05:00

| George Town (Cayman Islands) | 0–8 | Puerto Rico Islanders |
|---|---|---|
| Elliott (yellow card) 48'; Robinson (yellow card) 61'; Barton (yellow card) 83' | Report | Ramos 4', 20' (yellow card) 41'; Faña 22', 54', 56'; Elliott 27' (o.g.); Richardson 44'; Robinson 61' (o.g.) |

T.E. McField Sports Centre, George Town
Attendance: 300
Referee: Wilson da Costa (Bahamas)

== Final round ==
In the semifinals, the two second-round group winners play against the runners-up from the opposite group. The semifinal winners play in the final while the losers play in the third place match.

Matches played at Trinidad and Tobago.

Semi-finals
(Antigua and Barbuda) Antigua Barracuda | 0
(Trinidad and Tobago) Caledonia AIA | 2
(Puerto Rico) PR Islanders | 1
(Trinidad and Tobago) W Connection | 4

Final
(Trinidad and Tobago) Caledonia AIA(p) | 1 (4)
(Trinidad and Tobago) W Connection | 1 (3)
Third place
(Antigua and Barbuda) Antigua Barracuda | 0
(Puerto Rico) PR Islanders | 2

=== Semifinals ===
June 19, 2012
20:00 UTC−04:00

| Puerto Rico Islanders | 1 – 4 | (Trinidad and Tobago) W Connection |
|---|---|---|
| Vázquez (yellow card) 45'; Hansen 76' | Report | Joseph (yellow card) 3'; Britto 28', 66'; Britto 58'; Arcia (yellow card) 83' (goal) 90' |

Manny Ramjohn Stadium, San Fernando
Attendance: 400
Referee: Trevor Taylor (Barbados)

=== Third place match ===
June 21, 2012
18:00 UTC−04:00

| Antigua Barracuda (Antigua and Barbuda) | 0 – 2 | Puerto Rico Islanders |
|---|---|---|
| Thomas (yellow card) 14'; Byers (yellow card) 70' | Report | Hansen 19'; Martin (yellow card) 31'; Martínez (yellow card) 38'; Rivera (yellow card) 48'; Faña 52' (pen.) |

Manny Ramjohn Stadium, San Fernando
Attendance: 250
Referee: Adrian Skeete (Barbados)

The champion, runner-up, and third place qualify for the Group stage of the 2012–13 CONCACAF Champions League.

=== CONCACAF Champions League ===
==== Group 5 ====
| Team | Pld | W | D | L | GF | GA | GD | Pts | Qualification |
|---|---|---|---|---|---|---|---|---|---|
| (United States) Los Angeles Galaxy | 4 | 3 | 1 | 0 | 12 | 4 | +8 | 10 | Advance to championship round |
| Puerto Rico Islanders | 4 | 1 | 1 | 2 | 4 | 7 | −3 | 4 | |
| (El Salvador) Isidro Metapán | 4 | 1 | 0 | 3 | 7 | 12 | −5 | 3 | |

August 1, 2012
22:00

| Isidro Metapán (El Salvador) | 3–1 | Puerto Rico Islanders |
|---|---|---|
| Muñoz 51', 59', 88' | Report | Vázquez (yellow card) 12'; Addlery 25'; Needham (red card) 35'; Martínez (yellow card) 43'; Nurse (yellow card) 44' |

Estadio Jorge Calero Suárez, Metapán
Attendance: 1,480
Referee: Raúl Castro (Honduras)

August 29, 2012
22:00

| Los Angeles Galaxy (United States) | 4–0 | Puerto Rico Islanders |
|---|---|---|
| Meyer 7'; Villarreal 46'; McBean 80'; Stephens 82' | Report |

The Home Depot Center, Carson
Attendance: 7,500
Referee: Jafeth Perea (Panama)

September 19, 2012
20:00

| Puerto Rico Islanders | 0–0 | (United States) Los Angeles Galaxy |
|---|---|---|
| | Report |

Juan Ramón Loubriel Stadium, Bayamón
Attendance: 2,905
Referee: Raymond Bogle (Jamaica)

September 27, 2012
20:00

| Puerto Rico Islanders | 3 – 0 | (El Salvador) Isidro Metapán |
|---|---|---|
| Ramos 40', 79' (yellow card) 89'; Rivera (yellow card) 90+3'; Richardson 90+5' | Report | Sánchez (yellow card) 46'; Ramírez (yellow card) 86'; Suárez (yellow card) 90+3' |

Juan Ramón Loubriel Stadium, Bayamón
Attendance: 550
Referee: Courtney Campbell (Jamaica)

== Squad statistics ==
=== Goal scorers ===
| Place | Position | Nation | Number | Name | NASL | Playoffs | CFU Club Championship | CONCACAF Champions League | Total |
|---|---|---|---|---|---|---|---|---|---|
| 1 | FW | (Jamaica) | 11 | Nicholas Addlery | 9 | 0 | 0 | 1 | 10 |
| 2 | FW | (Dominican Republic) | 9 | Jonathan Faña | 4 | 0 | 4 | 0 | 8 |
| 3 | FW | (England) | 7 | David Foley | 6 | 1 | 0 | 0 | 7 |
| 3 | FW | (Puerto Rico) | 24 | Héctor Ramos | 3 | 0 | 2 | 2 | 7 |
| 5 | DF | (United States) | 33 | Jay Needham | 3 | 0 | 0 | 0 | 3 |
| 5 | FW | (Guyana) | 22 | Gregory Richardson | 1 | 0 | 1 | 1 | 3 |
| 7 | MF | (Puerto Rico) | 20 | Josh Hansen | 0 | 0 | 2 | 0 | 2 |
| 7 | | | | Own goal | 0 | 0 | 2 | 0 | 2 |
| 9 | DF | (Puerto Rico) | 3 | Richard Martinez | 1 | 0 | 0 | 0 | 1 |
| 9 | DF | (Puerto Rico) | 16 | Anthony Vázquez | 1 | 0 | 0 | 0 | 1 |
| 9 | DF | (Puerto Rico) | 5 | Noah Delgado | 1 | 0 | 0 | 0 | 1 |
| 9 | MF | (United States) | 14 | Jarad Van Schaik | 1 | 0 | 0 | 0 | 1 |
| 9 | MF | (Puerto Rico) | 17 | Tyler Wilson | 1 | 0 | 0 | 0 | 1 |
| 9 | MF | (Trinidad and Tobago) | 24 | Justin Fojo | 1 | 0 | 0 | 0 | 1 |
| | | | | TOTALS | 32 | 1 | 11 | 4 | 48 |
