= 2010 Puerto Rico Islanders season =

Puerto Rico Islanders
2010 season
- President: Andy Guillemard-Noble
- Head coach: Colin Clarke
- USSF D-2 Pro League: Conference: 5th League: 8th
- CFU Club Championship: Champions
- Champions League: Group stage
- Playoffs: Champions
- Top goalscorer: League: David Foley (5); All: Josh Hansen (7)
- Highest home attendance: League: 5,077; All: 12,993
Home colors	Away colors	Third colors

The 2010 season was the Puerto Rico Islanders seventh season. Due to the compromise achieved by the United States Soccer Federation between the feuding NASL and the USL, the Islanders played in the unified USSF Division 2 Professional League for this season. The Islanders also played in the 2009–10 and 2010–11 editions of the CONCACAF Champions League.

== Club ==
=== Management ===
Position	Staff
Head Coach	(Northern Ireland) Colin Clarke
Assistant Coach	(England) Adrian Whitbread
Goalkeeping Coach	(United States) Jack Stefanowski

Last updated: April 20, 2010
Source: Islanders FC

=== Kit ===
Supplier: Umbro
Sponsor(s): AT&T

Source: Puerto Rico Islanders

== Squad ==
as of August 1, 2010

Note: Flags indicate national team as defined under FIFA eligibility rules; some limited exceptions apply. Players may hold more than one non-FIFA nationality.

No.	Pos.	Nation	Player
1	GK	PUR	Bill Gaudette
2	DF	PUR	Scott Jones
3	DF	PUR	Richard Martínez
4	DF	PUR	Marco Vélez
5	MF	PUR	Noah Delgado (captain)
6	DF	PUR	Alexis Rivera Curet
7	FW	PUR	David Foley
8	MF	GUY	Chris Nurse
9	MF	DOM	Jonathan Faña (on loan from W Connection)
10	FW	TRI	Kendall Jagdeosingh
11	FW	JAM	Nicholas Addlery
12	FW	LBR	Anthony Allison

No.	Pos.	Nation	Player
13	DF	USA	David Horst (on loan from Real Salt Lake)
14	MF	HON	Junior Sandoval
15	MF	LBR	Sandy Gbandi
16	MF	USA	Joe Salem
17	MF	TRI	Keon Daniel
18	MF	TRI	Osei Telesford
19	DF	TRI	Kevon Villaroel
20	FW	PUR	Josh Hansen
21	DF	PUR	Logan Emory
22	MF	SLE	Shaka Bangura
23	GK	USA	Cody Laurendi
24	DF	TRI	Nigel Henry

== Competitions ==
=== Overall ===
Competition	Started position	Current position / round	Final position / round	First match	Last match
CONCACAF Champions League 2009-10	Preliminary round	-	Group stage	2009-07-29	2009-10-20
USSF D2 Pro regular season	-	-	Champions	2010-04-21	2010-10-30
2010 CFU Club Championship	Second round	-	Champions	2010-04-16	2010-05-09
2010-11 CONCACAF Champions League	Preliminary round	-	-	2010-07-26	-

=== USSF D2 Pro League ===
==== Regular season ====
===== USL Conference standings =====
USL Conference
Pos	Team	Pld	W	L	T	GF	GA	GD	Pts	Qualification
1	Rochester Rhinos	30	16	8	6	38	24	+14	54	Conference leader, qualified for playoffs
2	Austin Aztex	30	15	7	8	53	40	+13	53	Qualified for playoffs (Note: The remaining six teams with the highest point totals, regardless of conference, also advance to the playoffs.)
3	Portland Timbers	30	13	7	10	34	23	+11	49	Qualified for playoffs
4	NSC Minnesota Stars	30	11	12	7	32	36	−4	40	Qualified for playoffs
5	Puerto Rico Islanders	30	9	11	10	37	35	+2	37	Qualified for playoffs
6	FC Tampa Bay	30	7	12	11	41	46	−5	32	

Source: USSF D-2 schedule table

===== Results summary =====
Overall								Home						Away					
Pld	W	D	L	GF	GA	GD	Pts	W	D	L	GF	GA	GD	W	D	L	GF	GA	GD
6	3	0	3	8	9	−1	9	2	0	1	4	5	−1	1	0	2	4	4	0

Last updated: 2010-04-26.
Source: USSF D-2 Pro League 2010

===== Results by matchday =====
Matchday	1	2	3	4	5	6	7	8	9	10	11	12	13	14	15	16	17	18	19	20	21	22	23	24	25	26	27	28	29	30
Stadium	H	A	A	H	A	H	A	H	H	H	A	A	H	H	A	A	H	A	H	H	H	A	A	A	A	H	H	H	A	A
Result	W	W	L	L	L	W	L	L	D	W	W	L	D	W	L	D	D	D	W	D	D	W	W	W	L	D	L			

Updated to match(es) played on 2010-04-26. Source: USSF D-2 Pro League 2010
A = Away; H = Home; W = Win; D = Draw; L = Loss

USSF Division 2 Professional League
2010 winners

Puerto Rico Islanders
First title

=== CFU Club Championship ===
==== Second round ====
Team	Pld	W	D	L	GF	GA	GD	Pts
Puerto Rico Islanders	2	2	0	0	5	0	+5	6
(Haiti) Racing des Gonaïves	2	0	0	2	0	5	−5	0

==== Final round ====
The top three finishers qualify for the preliminary round of the 2010–11 CONCACAF Champions League.

All matches hosted in Trinidad & Tobago.

Team	Pld	W	D	L	GF	GA	GD	Pts
Puerto Rico Islanders	3	2	1	0	5	1	+4	7
(Trinidad and Tobago) Joe Public	3	1	1	1	3	4	−1	4
(Trinidad and Tobago) San Juan Jabloteh	3	1	0	2	4	3	+1	3
(Puerto Rico) Bayamón	3	1	0	2	4	8	−4	3

CFU Club Championship
2010 winners

Puerto Rico Islanders
First title

== Matches ==
=== USSF D-2 Pro League regular season ===
April 21, 2010	Puerto Rico Islanders	3–1	(United States) NSC Minnesota Stars	Bayamón
	Foley 12'; Telesford 16'; Gbandi 51'; Delgado (yellow card) 60'; Gbandi (yellow card) 66'	Report	Hlavaty 84'; Allen (yellow card) 90'	Stadium: Juan Ramón Loubriel Stadium; Attendance: 2,248; Referee: Richard Sanchez, William Anderson, Jesus Lebron

April 24, 2010	Crystal Palace Baltimore (United States)	1–3	Puerto Rico Islanders	Catonsville, Maryland
	Mbuta 90' (pen.); Pejic (yellow card); Teixeira (yellow card); Harrison (yellow card)	Report	Addlery 26'; Hansen 42'; Hansen 78' (pen.); Delgado (yellow card)	Stadium: UMBC Stadium; Attendance: 1,071

May 1, 2010	Montreal Impact (Canada)	1–0	Puerto Rico Islanders	Montreal, Quebec
	Soares 70'; Placentino (yellow card) 73'; Donatelli (yellow card) 81'	Report	Chris Nurse (yellow card) 57'	Stadium: Saputo Stadium; Attendance: 11554; Referee: Navarro, Gray, Carvalho, Charchafian

May 26, 2010	Puerto Rico Islanders	1–2	(United States) Carolina RailHawks FC	Bayamón
	Foley 73'; Jagdeosingh (yellow card) 45'; Nurse (yellow card) 70'; Vélez (yellow card) 67'; Horst (red card) 90+5'		Bundu 5'; Paladini 90+6'; Bobo (yellow card) 67'	Stadium: Juan Ramón Loubriel Stadium; Attendance: 5,077

May 29, 2010	Tampa Bay Rowdies (United States)	2–1	Puerto Rico Islanders	Tampa Bay, Florida
	Valentino (yellow card) 24'; Wheeler 43'; Wheeler (yellow card) 61'; King 67'		Nurse (yellow card) 12'; Emory (yellow card) 26'; Salem (red card); Vélez 56'; Vélez (yellow card) 86'	Stadium: George M. Steinbrenner Field; Attendance: 5,023

June 2, 2010	Puerto Rico Islanders	4–2	(United States) Miami FC	Bayamón
	Hansen 45 + 2'; Addlery 63'; Foley; 67'; Nurse 85'; Rivera (yellow card)	(Report)	Gómez 45 + 1'; Shriver 87'; Diaz (yellow card)	Stadium: Juan Ramón Loubriel Stadium; Attendance: 2,642

=== CFU Club Championship ===
April 16, 2010	Racing des Gonaïves (Haiti)	0–2	Puerto Rico Islanders	Bayamón
	Jean (yellow card) 24'; Philippe (yellow card) 25'; Louissaint (yellow card) 71'	Report	Gbandi 7'; Telesford (red card) 37'; Gbandi 77'	Stadium: Juan Ramón Loubriel Stadium; Attendance: 500; Referee: Javier Santos, Antonio Lopez, William Anderson, Jesus Lebron

April 18, 2010	Puerto Rico Islanders	3–0	(Haiti) Racing des Gonaïves	Bayamón
	Hansen 7'; Foley 36'; Gbandi (yellow card) 36'; Hansen 49'; Jones (red card) 80'	Report	Milcar (yellow card) 22'; Canès (yellow card) 37'; Innocent (red card) 44'; Philippe (yellow card) 85'	Stadium: Juan Ramón Loubriel Stadium; Attendance: 1,300; Referee: Antonio Lopez, Juan Perez, William Anderson, Jesus Lebron

May 5, 2010	Puerto Rico Islanders	3–0	(Puerto Rico) Bayamón FC	Macoya, Trinidad and Tobago
	Delgado 7'; Jagdeosingh (yellow card) 15'; Addlery 33'; Delgado (yellow card) 43'; Hansen 52'	Report	Guirand (yellow card) 8'; Brown (yellow card) 72'	Stadium: Marvin Lee Stadium; Attendance: 300; Referee: Courtney Campbell, Anthony Garwood, Garnet Paige, Neal Brizan

May 7, 2010	Joe Public (Trinidad and Tobago)	1–1	Puerto Rico Islanders	Macoya, Trinidad and Tobago
	Joseph 51'; Smith (yellow card) 90'	Report	Hansen 90'	Stadium: Marvin Lee Stadium; Attendance: 400; Referee: Raymond Bugle, Stephen Brown, Anthony Garwood, Neal Brizan

May 9, 2010	San Juan Jabloteh (Trinidad and Tobago)	0–1	Puerto Rico Islanders	Macoya, Trinidad and Tobago
	Manners 87		Addlery 19'; Nurse (yellow card) 46'; Jones (yellow card) 50'	Stadium: Marvin Lee Stadium; Attendance: 400

== Squad statistics ==
Competitive matches only. Numbers in brackets indicate appearances as a substitute under the Appearance column and number of assists under the Goal column.
Updated to games played May 9, 2010.

=== Players ===
Number	Position	Name	USL1 Regular Season		USL-1 Playoffs		2010-11 CONCACAF Champions League		CFU Club Championship		Total	
Number	Position	Name	Apps	Goals	Apps	Goals	Apps	Goals	Apps	Goals	Apps	Goals
2	DF	(United States) Scott Jones	5 (0)	0 (0)	-	-	-	-	5 (0)	0 (0)	-	-
3	DF	(Puerto Rico) Richard Martinez	2 (3)	0 (0)	-	-	-	-	4 (0)	0 (0)	-	-
4	DF	(Puerto Rico) Marco Vélez	5 (0)	1 (0)	-	-	-	-	5 (0)	0 (0)	-	-
5	MF	(Puerto Rico) Noah Delgado	3 (0)	0 (1)	-	-	-	-	5 (0)	1 (0)	-	-
6	DF	(Puerto Rico) Alexis Rivera Curet	4 (1)	0 (0)	-	-	-	-	1 (1)	0 (0)	-	-
7	FW	(England) David Foley	3 (1)	2 (0)	-	-	-	-	2 (0)	1 (0)	-	-
8	MF	(Guyana) Chris Nurse	3 (1)	0 (0)	-	-	-	-	3 (0)	0 (0)	-	-
9	MF	(Dominican Republic) Jonathan Faña Frias	-	-	-	-	-	-	-	-	-	-
10	FW	(Trinidad and Tobago) Kendall Jagdeosingh	2 (2)	0 (0)	-	-	-	-	4 (0)	0 (0)	-	-
11	FW	(Jamaica) Nicholas Addlery	5 (0)	1 (1)	-	-	-	-	4 (0)	2 (0)	-	-
12	FW	(Liberia) Anthony Allison	1 (2)	0 (0)	-	-	-	-	0 (1)	0 (0)	-	-
13	DF	(United States) David Horst	1 (0)	0 (1)	-	-	-	-	2 (0)	0 (0)	-	-
14	MF	(Honduras) Junior Sandoval	-	-	-	-	-	-	0 (1)	0 (0)	-	-
15	MF	(Liberia) Sandi Gbandi	3 (2)	1 (1)	-	-	-	-	2 (3)	2 (0)	-	-
16	MF	(United States) Joe Salem	3 (2)	0 (0)	-	-	-	-	3 (1)	0 (0)	-	-
18	MF	(Trinidad and Tobago) Osei Telesford	2 (1)	1 (0)	-	-	-	-	2 (1)	0 (0)	-	-
19	DF	(Trinidad and Tobago) Kevon Villaroel	-	-	-	-	-	-	0 (3)	0 (0)	-	-
20	FW	(United States) Josh Hansen	5 (0)	2 (1)	-	-	-	-	5 (0)	4 (0)	-	-
21	DF	(United States) Logan Emory	5 (0)	0 (0)	-	-	-	-	3 (0)	0 (0)	-	-
22	MF	(Sierra Leone) Shaka Bangura	0 (3)	0 (0)	-	-	-	-	0 (3)	0 (0)	-	-
	MF	(Trinidad and Tobago) Keon Daniel	-	-	-	-	-	-	-	-	-	-

=== Goalkeepers ===
Number	Position	Name	USL-1 Regular Season				USL-1 Playoffs				CONCACAF Champions League				CFU Club Championship				Total			
Number	Position	Name	Apps	GA	GAA	CKM	Apps	GA	GAA	CKM	Apps	GA	GAA	CKM	Apps	GA	GAA	CKM	Apps	GA	GAA	CKM
1	GK	(United States) Bill Gaudette	5 (0)	7	1.400	-	-	-	-	-	0 (0)	-	-	-	5 (0)	1	0.200	450	-	-	-	-
23	GK	(United States) Cody Laurendi	-	-	-	-	-	-	-	-	-	-	-	-	-	-	-	-	-	-	-	-
