= Chinese people in Costa Rica =

Total population
- 100,000

Regions with significant populations
- San José, Limón, Nicoya, Puntarenas

Languages
- Spanish, Chinese

Religion
- Buddhism, Taoism, Roman Catholicism

Related ethnic groups
- Chinese people, Asian Latinos

Chinese people have been immigrating to Costa Rica since the 19th century. They come from China (including the enclaves of Hong Kong and Macao), and from Taiwan. They form one of the main Chinese communities in the Americas; with around 9,000 citizens living in the country (according to the 2011 census) in the Caribbean Basin, this size is only surpassed by that of Panama.

This migratory phenomenon presents peaks of waves since the 1850s. Currently, the entry of Chinese to Costa Rica is continuously growing, according to the Office of Remittances and Development of the analyst institution Inter-American Dialogue, this population exceeds 45,000 inhabitants, which positions it as one of the main foreign communities of the Costa Rican population. Historically, both the Pacific and Atlantic coasts and the city of San José have been the poles of concentration of the Asian community in the country.

== History ==
The first Chinese migrants arrived in Costa Rica in 1855; they were a group of 77 originally from Guangzhou, who had come to Central America to work on the Panama Railway. Of them, 32 found work on the farm of José María Cañas, while the remaining 45 were hired by Alejandro Von Bulow, an agent sent by the Berlin Colonization Society to prepare suitable sites for German settlement in Costa Rica. During the 1859-1863 administration of José María Montealegre Fernández, laws were promulgated which prohibited the migration of blacks and Asians, in an effort to reserve Costa Rica for European settlers.

Early Chinese migrants typically arrived by sea through the Pacific coast port of Puntarenas; a "Chinese colony" began to form in the area, founded by José Chen Apuy, a migrant from Zhongshan, Guangdong who arrived in 1873. Puntarenas was so widely known among the Chinese community as a destination that some in China mistook it for the name of the whole country.

In the 1970s, Taiwan began to become a major source of Chinese immigration to Costa Rica. However, they formed a transitory group, with many using Costa Rica as a stopover while they waited for permission to settle in the United States or Canada. Those who settled permanently in Costa Rica included many pensioners enjoying their retirement abroad.

Most Chinese immigrants since then have been Cantonese, but in the last decades of the 20th century, a number of immigrants have also come from Taiwan. Many men came alone to work and married Costa Rican women and speak Cantonese. However the majority of the descendants of the first Chinese immigrants no longer speak Cantonese and feel themselves to be Costa Ricans.

== Crime ==
Chinese mafia are believed to have begun operating in Costa Rica in 1991; they are typically involved in collection of gambling debts. Crimes attributed to them include two kidnappings for ransom in October 1998 and two more in May 2002.

== Notable people ==
- Franklin Chang Díaz, astronaut
- Eduardo Li, president of the Costa Rican football federation
- Cheng Siu Chung, retired football player now coach in Hong Kong
- Harry Shum Jr., actor
- Roberto Wong Ordeñana, footballer
- Luis Guillermo Solís, former President of Costa Rica
- Leonardo Ly Rojas, footballer

== See also ==
- China–Costa Rica relations
- Chinese diaspora
- Immigration to Costa Rica
