= Joe Salem =

Joe Salem may refer to:

- Joe Salem (American football) (born 1938), American football coach and former player
- Joe Salem (soccer) (born 1987), American soccer player
- Joe Salem (sport shooter) (born 1960), Lebanese sports shooter
