= Kevon Villaroel =

Trinidadian soccer player (born 1987)

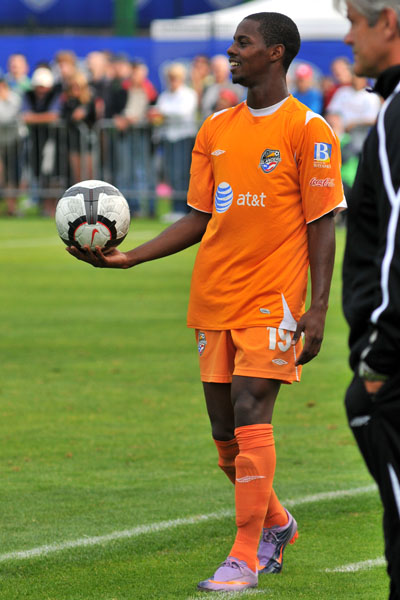

Personal information
- Full name: Kevon Anthony Villaroel
- Date of birth: December 17, 1987 (age 38)
- Place of birth: Diego Martin, Trinidad and Tobago
- Height: 5 ft 9 in (1.75 m)
- Positions: Left wing back; left winger; center back

Team information
- Current team: North East Stars FC
- Number: 3

Youth career
- 2003–2005: Joe Public FC
- 2005–2006: St Anns Rangers
- 2006–2007: San Juan Jabloteh

Senior career*
| Years | Team | Apps | (Gls) |
| 2007–2008 | San Juan Jabloteh | 15 | (5) |
| 2009–2011 | Puerto Rico Islanders | 34 | (3) |
| 2012–2014 | North East Stars FC | 40 | (4) |
| 2014 | C.S. Visé | 6 | (0) |
| 2015–2017 | Central FC | 45 | (2) |
| 2017–present | North East Stars FC | 15 | (1) |

International career^{‡}
| 2017– | Trinidad and Tobago | 5 | (1) |
- * Club domestic league appearances and goals as of 4 June 2011 ‡ National team caps and goals as of 25 August 2017

Kevon Villaroel (born December 17, 1987) is a Trinidadian soccer player who currently plays for the Central FC of the TT Pro League

== Career ==
=== Youth and amateur ===
Villaroel attended Fatima College and St. Anthony College in his native Trinidad, winning both the North Zone Intercol and National Intercol with Fatima College, also winning the silver medal for finishing second in the BGTT League, scoring seven goals and eleven assists that season. Kevon was also named in the National All Star Team that year, and was a member of the U-17 side of Trindadian club Super Star Rangers, Joe Public FC, San Juan Jabloteh Reserves respectively.

=== Professional ===
Villaroel began his professional career with San Juan Jabloteh in 2007, helping the team to the TT Pro League title in 2007 and 2008. In 2009, he moved to the Puerto Rico Islanders of the USL First Division reaching to the CONCACAF Champions League Semi Final in 2009 and winning the USSF Division 2 Pro League Championship 2010. At the end of his third season with the Puerto Rico Islanders he moved back to his native Trinidad and Tobago to play with his longtime rival North East Stars instantly helping them win the 2012 Toyota Classic Cup. Villaroel stamped an instant impression in the league which he was rewarded with his first National Senior team call up. After finishing the 2013-2014 season he moved from his home land to join Belgian team CS Visé of the Belgian Third Division. Villaroel successfully completed his move on the transfer window deadline day. After CS Visé financial failure in the 2015-2016 season Villaroel then joined current TT Pro League and CFU Club Championship Winners Central FC where he helped the club to a very successful season winning TT Pro League CFU Club Championship First Citizens Cup Digicel Pro Bowl and their birth in the CONCACAF Champions League 2015-2016. Villaroel is currently a squad player for the Trinidad and Tobago National Senior Team.

=== International ===
Villaroel was called up to the senior Trinidad and Tobago in 2013 and was also in the squad for a friendly against Grenada in March 2016. In 2017 he was part of the senior team 2017 Concacaf World Cup Qualifiers squad.

=== International goals ===
Scores and results list Trinidad and Tobago'a goal tally first.

| No | Date | Venue | Opponent | Score | Result | Competition |
|---|---|---|---|---|---|---|
| 1. | 22 August 2017 | Hasely Crawford Stadium, Port of Spain, Trinidad and Tobago | Jamaica | 1–1 | 1–2 | Friendly |

== Honors ==
=== San Juan Jabloteh ===
- TT Pro League: 2007, 2008
- First Citizens Cup Winner

=== Puerto Rico Islanders ===
- CFU Club Championship: Winner 2010, 2011
- USSF Division 2 Pro League Championship: 2010
- North American Soccer League: Semi Finalist 2011

=== North East Stars ===
- Toyota Classic Cup: Winner 2012

=== Central FC ===
- CFU Club Championship: Winner 2015
- TT Pro League Winner 2014-2015
- First Citizens Cup Winner 2015
- Digicel Pro Bowl Winner 2015
- TT Pro League Winner 2015-2016
- CFU Club Championship: Winner 2016
- TT Pro League Winner 2016-2017
