= 2011 CFU Club Championship =

2011 CFU Club Champions’ Cup

Tournament details
- Dates: March 10 – May 27, 2011
- Teams: 15 (from 11 associations)

Final positions
- Champions: Puerto Rico Islanders (2nd title)
- Runners-up: (Haiti) Tempête
- Third place: (Guyana) Alpha United
- Fourth place: (Trinidad and Tobago) Defence Force

Tournament statistics
- Matches played: 22
- Goals scored: 58 (2.64 per match)
- Attendance: 16,787 (763 per match)
- Top scorer(s): (Trinidad and Tobago) Michael Edwards (Dominican Republic) Jonathan Faña (Trinidad and Tobago) Richard Roy (4 goals each)

The 2011 CFU Club Champions’ Cup was the 13th edition of the CFU Club Championship, the annual international club football competition in the Caribbean region, held amongst clubs whose football associations are affiliated with the Caribbean Football Union (CFU). The top three teams in the tournament qualified for the 2011–12 CONCACAF Champions League.

== Participating teams ==
The following teams were all entered into the competition.

Association	Team	Qualification method
Antigua and Barbuda	Bassa	2009–10 Antigua and Barbuda Premier Division champion
Bermuda	Dandy Town Hornets	2009–10 Bermudian Premier Division champion
Cayman Islands	Bodden Town	2009–10 CIFA National League runner-up
Dominica	Bath Estate	2009–10 Dominica Championship champion
Guyana	Alpha United	2010 GFF National Super League champion
Guyana	Milerock	2010 GFF National Super League runner-up
Haiti	Tempête	2010–11 Ligue Haïtienne Ouverture champion
Puerto Rico	River Plate	2010 Puerto Rico Soccer League champion
Puerto Rico	Puerto Rico Islanders	2010 Puerto Rico Soccer League runner-up
Saint Kitts and Nevis	Newtown United	2009–10 SKNFA Premier League champion
Saint Lucia	Northern United All Stars	2010 Saint Lucia Premier Division champion
Suriname	Inter Moengotapoe	2009–10 Hoofdklasse champion
Suriname	WBC	2009–10 Hoofdklasse runner-up
Trinidad and Tobago	Defence Force	2010–11 TT Pro League champion
Trinidad and Tobago	Caledonia AIA	2010–11 TT Pro League runner-up

- th – Title holders

The following associations did not enter a team:

- Anguilla
- Aruba
- (The Bahamas) Bahamas
- Barbados
- British Virgin Islands
- Cuba
- Curaçao
- Dominican Republic
- French Guiana
- Grenada
- Guadeloupe
- Jamaica
- Martinique
- Montserrat
- (Collectivity of Saint Martin) Saint Martin
- Saint Vincent and the Grenadines
- Sint Maarten
- Turks and Caicos Islands
- United States Virgin Islands

== Competition format ==
The draw for the tournament took place on February 2, 2011. The first two rounds were played as two-leg, aggregate-goal series. The away goals rule would be applied, and extra time and penalty shootout would be used to decide the winner if necessary. The defending champion, Puerto Rico Islanders, received a bye to the second round. The final round, which consists of the semifinals, the third-place match, and the final, were played as one-leg matches. The original schedule as announced by the CFU is as follows (however, many matches of the first two rounds were played outside the original schedule):

Round	1st leg	2nd leg
First round	March 9–11	March 18–20
Second round	April 12–14	April 22–24
Final round	May 25–29	

It was originally announced that the final round would be played at Trinidad and Tobago. However, it was announced on May 12, 2011, that Guyana's Alpha United, one of the semifinalists, would host the final round at Providence Stadium in Providence, Guyana, with the semifinals on May 25, and the third-placed match and the final on May 27.

== Preliminary phase ==
=== Elimination stage 1 ===
The first round schedule was announced on March 2, 2011.

Team 1	Agg.	Team 2	1st leg	2nd leg
Dandy Town Hornets (Bermuda)	1–4^{1}	(Trinidad and Tobago) Defence Force	1–1	0–3
Newtown United (Saint Kitts and Nevis)	0–6	(Trinidad and Tobago) Caledonia AIA	0–1	0–5
Milerock (Guyana)	2–2 (a)	(Suriname) Inter Moengotapoe	0–1	2–1
Northern United All Stars (Saint Lucia)	1–6	(Suriname) WBC	0–3	1–3
River Plate (Puerto Rico)	2–1	(Cayman Islands) Bodden Town	2–0	0–1
Bath Estate (Dominica)	w/o^{2}	(Haiti) Tempête		
Alpha United (Guyana)	w/o^{2}	(Antigua and Barbuda) Bassa		

Notes

- Note 1: Order of legs reversed after original draw.
- Note 2: Bath Estate and Bassa withdrew from the competition. Tempête and Alpha United advanced automatically.

==== First leg ====
March 10, 2011
20:00 UTC−04:00

Dandy Town Hornets (Bermuda)	1 – 1	(Trinidad and Tobago) Defence Force
Swan 22'	Report	Narcis 30'

BAA Field, Hamilton
Attendance: 350
Referee: Kenville Holder (Cayman Islands)

March 10, 2011
20:00 UTC−04:00

Newtown United (Saint Kitts and Nevis)	0 – 1	(Trinidad and Tobago) Caledonia AIA
	Report	Rochford 53'

Newtown Football Stadium, Basseterre
Attendance: 500
Referee: Bryan Willett (Antigua and Barbuda)

March 13, 2011
16:00 UTC−04:00

Northern United All Stars (Saint Lucia)	0 – 3	(Suriname) WBC
	Report	Aílton 32'; Lupson 45+2'; Felter 49'

Mindoo Philip Park, Castries
Attendance: 320
Referee: Stanley Lancaster (Guyana)

March 13, 2011
19:30 UTC−04:00

Milerock (Guyana)	0 – 1	(Suriname) Inter Moengotapoe
	Report	Brunswijk 88'

MacKenzie Sport Club Ground, Linden
Attendance: 300
Referee: Lee Davis (Trinidad and Tobago)

March 18, 2011
19:00 UTC−05:00

River Plate (Puerto Rico)	2 – 0	(Cayman Islands) Bodden Town
Megaloudis 2'; Frantz 63'	Report

T.E. McField Sports Centre, George Town (Cayman Islands)^{3}
Attendance: 150
Referee: Dave Peterkin (Jamaica)

Notes

- Note 3: Match played in Cayman Islands instead of Puerto Rico.

==== Second leg ====
March 19, 2011
18:00 UTC−04:00

Defence Force (Trinidad and Tobago)	3 – 0	(Bermuda) Dandy Town Hornets
Narcis 18'; Edwards 73', 84'	Report

Manny Ramjohn Stadium, San Fernando
Attendance: 500
Referee: Kevin Thomas (Jamaica)

Defence Force won 4–1 on aggregate.

March 19, 2011
20:00 UTC−03:00

Inter Moengotapoe (Suriname)	1 – 2	(Guyana) Milerock
van Dijk 90+3'	Report	Hercules 5'; Crandon 75'

André Kamperveen Stadion, Paramaribo
Attendance: 1,500
Referee: Bryan Willett (Antigua and Barbuda)

2–2 on aggregate; Milerock won on the away goals rule.

March 19, 2011
19:30 UTC−04:00

Caledonia AIA (Trinidad and Tobago)	5 – 0	(Saint Kitts and Nevis) Newtown United
Stewart 12'; Rochford 43'; Joseph 48'; Armstrong 64'; Woodley 89'	Report

Hasely Crawford Stadium, Port of Spain
Attendance: 500
Referee: Stanley Lancaster (Guyana)

Caledonia AIA won 6–0 on aggregate.

March 20, 2011
18:00 UTC−05:00

Bodden Town (Cayman Islands)	1 – 0	(Puerto Rico) River Plate
Calderon 75'	Report

T.E. McField Sports Centre, George Town
Attendance: 275
Referee: Dave Peterkin (Jamaica)

River Plate won 2–1 on aggregate.

March 26, 2011
20:00 UTC−03:00

WBC (Suriname)	3 – 1	(Saint Lucia) Northern United All Stars
Aroepa 3'; Lupson 40'; Afonsoewa 49'	Report	Prosper 17'

André Kamperveen Stadion, Paramaribo
Attendance: 300
Referee: Lee Davis (Trinidad and Tobago)

WBC won 6–1 on aggregate.

=== Elimination stage 2 ===
The second round schedule was announced on April 1, 2011.

Team 1	Agg.	Team 2	1st leg	2nd leg
WBC (Suriname)	1–8^{4}	Puerto Rico Islanders	1–1	0–7
Milerock (Guyana)	0–7	(Trinidad and Tobago) Defence Force	0–4	0–3
Caledonia AIA (Trinidad and Tobago)	1–1 (2–3 p)	(Haiti) Tempête	0–1	1–0 (aet)
Alpha United (Guyana)	3–2	(Puerto Rico) River Plate	0–0	3–2

Notes

- Note 4: Order of legs reversed after original draw.

==== First leg ====
April 10, 2011
19:30 UTC−04:00

Milerock (Guyana)	0 – 4	(Trinidad and Tobago) Defence Force
	Report	K. Joseph 8'; Roy 31'; Edwards 60', 67'

MacKenzie Sport Club Ground, Linden
Attendance: 600
Referee: Ignatius Baptiste (Dominica)

April 15, 2011
20:00 UTC−04:00

Alpha United (Guyana)	0 – 0	(Puerto Rico) River Plate
	Report

Bourda Cricket Ground, Georgetown
Attendance: 500
Referee: Neal Brizan (Trinidad and Tobago)

April 22, 2011
20:00 UTC−04:00

Caledonia AIA (Trinidad and Tobago)	0 – 1	(Haiti) Tempête
	Report	Armstrong 5' (o.g.)

Ato Boldon Stadium, Couva
Attendance: 520
Referee: Trevor Taylor (Barbados)

May 7, 2011
20:00 UTC−03:00

WBC (Suriname)	1 – 1	Puerto Rico Islanders
Sandvliet 48'	Report	Cunningham 90+1'

André Kamperveen Stadion, Paramaribo
Attendance: 500
Referee: Raymond Bogle (Jamaica)

==== Second leg ====
April 17, 2011
15:00 UTC−04:00

River Plate (Puerto Rico)	2 – 3	(Guyana) Alpha United
Maroni 78'; Díaz 90+4'	Report	Peters 55' (pen.); Abrams 58'; Murray 83'

Bourda Cricket Ground, Georgetown (Guyana)^{5}
Attendance: 500
Referee: Lee Davis (Trinidad and Tobago)

Alpha United won 3–2 on aggregate.

April 22, 2011
18:00 UTC−04:00

Defence Force (Trinidad and Tobago)	3 – 0	(Guyana) Milerock
Elcock 11'; Roy 43', 89'	Report

Ato Boldon Stadium, Couva
Attendance: 520
Referee: Kevin Morrison (Jamaica)

Defence Force won 7–0 on aggregate.

May 8, 2011^{6}
16:00 UTC−05:00

Tempête (Haiti)	0 – 1 (a.e.t.)	(Trinidad and Tobago) Caledonia AIA
	Report	Armstrong 6'
Penalties
	3 – 2

Parc Levelt, Saint-Marc
Attendance: 4,552
Referee: Rudolph Angela (Aruba)

1–1 on aggregate; Tempête won on penalties.

May 14, 2011
20:00 UTC−04:00

Puerto Rico Islanders	7 – 0	(Suriname) WBC
Delgado 5', 8'; Pitchkolan 12'; Foley 37'; Bouraee 44'; Faña 56'; Salem 88' (pen.)	Report

Estadio Juan Ramón Loubriel, Bayamón
Attendance: 500
Referee: Kevin Morrison (Jamaica)

Puerto Rico Islanders won 8–1 on aggregate.

Notes

- Note 5: Match played in Guyana instead of Puerto Rico.
- Note 6: Delayed from April 29, 2011, because of Caledonia's travel issues to Haiti.

== Final phase ==
The draw for the final round was made on May 16, 2011. All matches were played at Providence Stadium in Providence, Guyana.

Semi-finals
(Haiti) Tempête (pen.)	0 (4)
(Trinidad and Tobago) Defence Force	0 (2)
(Guyana) Alpha United	1
(Puerto Rico) PR Islanders (aet)	3

Final
(Haiti) Tempête	1
(Puerto Rico) PR Islanders (aet)	3
Third place
(Trinidad and Tobago) Defence Force	1 (3)
(Guyana) Alpha United (pen.)	1 (4)

=== Semifinals ===
May 25, 2011
18:00 UTC−04:00

Tempête (Haiti)	0 – 0 (a.e.t.)	(Trinidad and Tobago) Defence Force
	Report
Penalties
Charles (penalty scored); Valdano (penalty scored); Gregory (penalty scored); Changler (penalty scored)	4 – 2	(penalty scored) Roy; (penalty scored) K. Joseph; (penalty missed) Fletcher; (penalty missed) A. Joseph

Providence Stadium, Providence
Attendance: 900
Referee: Bryan Willett (Antigua and Barbuda)

May 25, 2011
20:00 UTC−04:00

Alpha United (Guyana)	1 – 3 (a.e.t.)	Puerto Rico Islanders
Jacobs 37'	Report	Bouraee 23'; Faña 108'; Foley 116'

Providence Stadium, Providence
Attendance: 1,500
Referee: Ignatius Baptiste (Dominica)

=== Third place match ===
May 27, 2011
18:00 UTC−04:00

Defence Force (Trinidad and Tobago)	1 – 1 (a.e.t.)	(Guyana) Alpha United
Roy 58'	Report	Peters 52'
Penalties
	3 – 4

Providence Stadium, Providence
Attendance: 1,000
Referee: Caswell Cambridge (Saint Vincent and the Grenadines)

=== Final ===
May 27, 2011
20:30 UTC−04:00

Tempête (Haiti)	1 – 3 (a.e.t.)	Puerto Rico Islanders
Charles 42'	Report	Needham 34'; Faña 100', 113'

Providence Stadium, Providence
Attendance: 500
Referee: Trevor Taylor (Barbados)

CFU Club Championship
2011 Winners

Puerto Rico Islanders
Second Title

Puerto Rico Islanders, Tempête, and Alpha United qualified for the Preliminary Round of the 2011–12 CONCACAF Champions League.

== Top goalscorers ==
Rank	Player	Team	Goals
1	(Trinidad and Tobago) Michael Edwards	(Trinidad and Tobago) Defence Force	4
1	(Dominican Republic) Jonathan Faña	Puerto Rico Islanders	4
1	(Trinidad and Tobago) Richard Roy	(Trinidad and Tobago) Defence Force	4
4	(Trinidad and Tobago) Akim Armstrong	(Trinidad and Tobago) Caledonia AIA	2
4	(United States) Matthew Bouraee	Puerto Rico Islanders	2
4	(Puerto Rico) Noah Delgado	Puerto Rico Islanders	2
4	(England) David Foley	Puerto Rico Islanders	2
4	(Suriname) Rinaldo Lupson	(Suriname) WBC	2
4	(Trinidad and Tobago) Sean Narcis	(Trinidad and Tobago) Defence Force	2
4	(Guyana) Dwight Peters	(Guyana) Alpha United	2
4	(Trinidad and Tobago) Jean-Luc Rochford	(Trinidad and Tobago) Caledonia AIA	2
