= Michael Boulware =

American football player (born 1981)

No. 28
- Position: Safety

Personal information
- Born: September 17, 1981 (age 45); Columbia, South Carolina, U.S.
- Listed height: 6 ft 3 in (1.91 m)
- Listed weight: 220 lb (100 kg)

Career information
- High school: Spring Valley (Columbia)
- College: Florida State
- NFL draft: 2004: 2nd round, 53rd overall pick

Career history
- Seattle Seahawks (2004–2006); Houston Texans (2007); Minnesota Vikings (2008)

Awards and highlights
- Third-team All-American (2003); First-team All-ACC (2003); Second-team All-ACC (2002)

Career NFL statistics
- Total tackles: 189
- Sacks: 3.0
- Forced fumbles: 4
- Fumble recoveries: 1
- Interceptions: 11
- Defensive touchdowns: 1
- Stats at Pro Football Reference

Michael Boulware (born September 17, 1981) is an American former professional football player who was a safety in the National Football League (NFL). He played college football for the Florida State Seminoles and was selected by the Seattle Seahawks in the second round of the 2004 NFL draft. He also played in the NFL for the Houston Texans.

Boulware's older brother Peter Boulware also played in the NFL.

== Early life ==
Boulware attended Spring Valley High School in South Carolina. He played safety and linebacker on the school's football team. Boulware was selected as South Carolina's Gatorade Player of the Year in 1999; he committed to play college football for the Florida State Seminoles.

== College career ==
At Florida State University (FSU) he started every game in 2001 at strongside linebacker, and was an All-America candidate in his senior year.

As a Freshman he was FSU's top tackler on kickoff teams; he was 21st on the team with 21 tackles. As a Sophomore he ranked 4th in the Atlantic Coast Conference and tied for the team lead with three interceptions. He led the Seminole defense in scoring with two touchdowns, and ranked 4th on the team in tackles with 81. As a Junior he started every game at strongside line-backer. He was a semifinalist for the Butkus Award, and named to the All-ACC second-team.

== Professional career ==
Pre-draft measurables
| Height | Weight | Arm length | Hand span | 40-yard dash | 20-yard shuttle | Three-cone drill | Vertical jump | Broad jump | Bench press |
|---|---|---|---|---|---|---|---|---|---|
| 6 ft 2 in (1.88 m) | 225 lb (102 kg) | 32 7/8 in (0.84 m) | 8 5/8 in (0.22 m) | 4.47 s | 3.92 s | 6.89 s | 39.5 in (1.00 m) | 10 ft 2 in (3.10 m) | 15 reps |
All values from NFL Combine/Pro Day

=== Seattle Seahawks ===
After college, Boulware went on to play for the Seattle Seahawks defense as a part-time linebacker and strong safety. In his rookie year he had a forced fumble, a sack, fifty-three tackles and most impressively, intercepted five passes, the most interceptions for any rookie ever to play for the Seahawks (until Earl Thomas did it in 2010). The end of his second year proved to be rewarding as the Seahawks played in Super Bowl XL, in which he intercepted a pass from Ben Roethlisberger. On Wednesday, October 25, Mike Holmgren, coach of the Seattle Seahawks, announced Jordan Babineaux would replace Michael Boulware at the free safety position. Mike Holmgren said that Boulware could get his job back later in the season, which he did in the December 24 game against San Diego.

=== Houston Texans ===
On September 1, 2007, the Seahawks traded Boulware to the Houston Texans for former first-round pick Jason Babin.

=== Minnesota Vikings ===
On March 20, 2008, the Minnesota Vikings signed Boulware to a one-year contract. On August 28, 2008, he suffered a wrist injury and was subsequently placed on IR on August 30, 2008, ending his season.

== NFL career statistics ==
Legend
| **Bold** | Career high |

| Year | Team | GP | COMB | TOTAL | AST | SACK | FF | FR | FR YDS | INT | IR YDS | AVG IR | LNG | TD | PD |
|---|---|---|---|---|---|---|---|---|---|---|---|---|---|---|---|
| 2004 | SEA | 16 | 63 | 47 | **16** | 1.0 | **2** | 0 | 0 | **5** | 69 | 14 | **63** | **1** | 6 |
| 2005 | SEA | 16 | **73** | **58** | 15 | **2.0** | 1 | 0 | 0 | 4 | **107** | **27** | 40 | 0 | **9** |
| 2006 | SEA | 16 | 40 | 32 | 8 | 0.0 | 1 | **1** | 0 | 2 | 1 | 1 | 1 | 0 | 6 |
| 2007 | HOU | 16 | 11 | 7 | 4 | 0.0 | 0 | 0 | 0 | 0 | 0 | 0 | 0 | 0 | 2 |
| Career | | 64 | 187 | 144 | 43 | 3.0 | 4 | 1 | 0 | 11 | 177 | 16 | 63 | 1 | 23 |

== Coaching ==
In 2015, he was an assistant football coach at Cardinal Newman High School. He joined the staff of his alma mater, Spring Valley High School, as a safeties and linebackers coach in 2018.

== Family ==
His wife Jessica is a former pitcher for the Florida State University softball team, and was named an All-American. They were married in 2004. They have a son, Michael Jr, and a daughter, Aspen.

His nephew Tyler Wilson plays international soccer for Puerto Rico.

== See also ==
- List of Spring Valley High School alumni
