= Scott Jones (Puerto Rican footballer) =

Puerto Rican international footballer (born 1983)

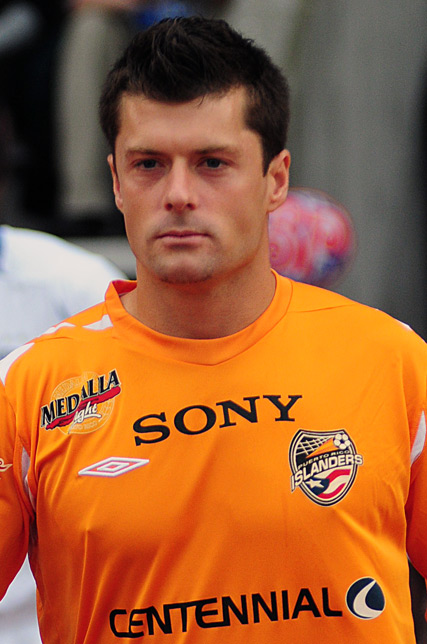

Personal information
- Full name: Scott Lyman Jones
- Date of birth: September 22, 1983 (age 43)
- Place of birth: San Antonio, Texas, United States
- Height: 5 ft 11 in (1.80 m)
- Position: Midfielder

Youth career
- 2003–2006: UNC Greensboro Spartans

Senior career*
Years	Team	Apps	(Gls)
2004–2006	Carolina Dynamo	32	(8)
2007	FC Dallas	0	(0)
2008–2011	Puerto Rico Islanders	74	(1)
2012	Charlotte Eagles	9	(0)

International career^{‡}
2011–2012	Puerto Rico	12	(0)
- * Club domestic league appearances and goals as of July 15, 2012 ‡ National team caps and goals as of July 15, 2012

Scott Lyman Jones (born September 22, 1983) is a Puerto Rican international footballer.

== Career ==
=== College and amateur ===
Jones grew up in Dallas, Texas, where he attended Jesuit College Preparatory School of Dallas. He then attended the University of North Carolina at Greensboro, playing on the men's college soccer team from 2003 to 2006. He was a 2004 second team All American and a 2005 first team All American. In 2004, he began playing for the Carolina Dynamo of the USL Premier Development League during the collegiate off season.

=== Professional ===
On January 12, 2007, FC Dallas selected Jones in the third round (28th overall) in the 2007 MLS SuperDraft. Dallas announced they had signed Jones on March 28, 2007. He played four games, scoring two goals, with the Dallas reserves, but saw no first team time. The team gave him a trial in February 2008, but he decided to leave on March 2, 2008. He signed with the Puerto Rico Islanders of the USL First Division that same year.

=== International ===
Jones was called up to the Puerto Rico national team in September 2011. As a United States citizen, he is eligible to the national team after residing in the Commonwealth for more than two years while playing with the Puerto Rico Islanders. He got his first cap in a 2014 FIFA World Cup qualification stage match against Saint Kitts and Nevis on September 2, 2011, which ended in a 0–0 draw.

== Honors ==
=== Puerto Rico Islanders ===
- Commissioner's Cup Winners (1): 2008
- CFU Club Championship Winner (1): 2010
