= Anthony Vázquez =

Puerto Rican footballer

Personal information
- Date of birth: July 29, 1988 (age 38)
- Place of birth: Brooklyn, New York, United States
- Height: 1.88 m (6 ft 2 in)
- Position: Defender

Youth career
- 2008: St. John's Red Storm
- 2009–2011: Monmouth Hawks

Senior career*
Years	Team	Apps	(Gls)
2012	Puerto Rico Islanders	17	(1)
2013	Pittsburgh Riverhounds	2	(0)

International career^{‡}
2008	Puerto Rico U20	3	(0)
2012–	Puerto Rico	11	(0)
- * Club domestic league appearances and goals as of April 20, 2013 ‡ National team caps and goals as of March 6, 2013

Anthony Vázquez (born July 29, 1988) is a footballer. Born in the continental United States, he represents the Puerto Rico national team.
