= Isaac Nieves Rivera =

Puerto Rican footballer

Isaac Nieves
Personal information
- Full name: Isaac Nieves Rivera
- Date of birth: January 6, 1982 (age 44)
- Place of birth: San Juan, Puerto Rico
- Position: Midfielder

Team information
- Current team: Bayamon FC

Senior career*
Years	Team	Apps	(Gls)
2004–2006	Puerto Rico Islanders	41	(0)
2008–2009	Sevilla FC Puerto Rico	30	(0)
2010–	Bayamon FC	2	(1)

International career
2004–	Puerto Rico	5	(1)
- * Club domestic league appearances and goals as of 9 July 2008

Isaac "Saito" Nieves (born January 6, 1981, in Puerto Rico) is a Puerto Rican soccer player who currently plays midfielder for Bayamon FC of the Puerto Rico Soccer League. Nieves played for the Puerto Rico national football team in a 2010 FIFA World Cup qualifying match.

== International goals ==
#	Date	Venue	Opponent	Score	Result	Competition
?	October 22, 2010	St´Georges	Grenada	1-3	Loss	2010 Caribbean Championship
