= Tyrone Maria =

Curaçao footballer

Personal information
- Date of birth: 24 September 1984 (age 42)
- Place of birth: Willemstad, Netherlands Antilles
- Position: Striker

Team information
- Current team: SV La Fama

Senior career*
Years	Team	Apps	(Gls)
2005–2010	SV. Hubentut Fortuna	58	(27)
2010–2012	SV Bubali	25	(12)
2013–	SV La Fama		

International career
2006	Netherlands Antilles	2	(1)
2013	Curaçao	1	(0)
- * Club domestic league appearances and goals

Tyrone Maria (born 24 September 1984) is a footballer from Curaçao who plays as a striker in actually for SV La Fama in the Aruba first division.

He earned two caps for the Netherlands Antilles national team in 2006.
