= Andrés Pérez (footballer, born 1988) =

Puerto Rican footballer

Personal information
- Full name: Andrés Edgardo Pérez Cruz
- Date of birth: 10 May 1988 (age 38)
- Place of birth: Orlando, Florida, United States
- Height: 1.83 m (6 ft 0 in)
- Position: Defensive midfielder

College career
| Years | Team | Apps | (Gls) |
| 2007–2010 | Barry Buccaneers | 62 | (6) |

Senior career*
| Years | Team | Apps | (Gls) |
| 2011–2012 | Sevilla FC Puerto Rico | | |
| 2012 | Puerto Rico Islanders | 2 | (0) |
| 2013 | Sevilla FC Puerto Rico | | |
| 2014 | Bayamón | | |
| 2015—? | Weston FC | | |

International career^{‡}
| 2011–2015 | Puerto Rico | 17 | (0) |
- * Club domestic league appearances and goals as of 20:33, 18 April 2016 (UTC) ‡ National team caps and goals as of 20:33, 18 April 2016 (UTC)

Andrés Edgardo Pérez Cruz (born 10 May 1988) is a Puerto Rican international footballer who plays as a defensive midfielder.

== Career ==
Born in Orlando, Florida, Pérez played club soccer for the Barry Buccaneers and at senior level for Sevilla FC Puerto Rico, Puerto Rico Islanders, Bayamón, Weston FC.

He made his international debut for Puerto Rico in 2011, and has appeared in FIFA World Cup qualifying matches.
