= Leighton Elliott =

Caymanian footballer

Personal information
- Full name: Leighton Elliott
- Date of birth: 23 October 1984 (age 42)
- Place of birth: Cayman Islands
- Position: Defender

Team information
- Current team: George Town SC

Senior career*
Years	Team	Apps	(Gls)
2009–	George Town SC		

International career^{‡}
2008–	Cayman Islands	11	(0)
- * Club domestic league appearances and goals ‡ National team caps and goals as of 10:33, 9 April 2012 (UTC)

Leighton Elliott (born 23 October 1984) is a Caymanian footballer who plays as a defender. He has represented the Cayman Islands during the 2010 Caribbean Championship and World Cup qualifying matches in 2008 and 2011.
