= Leonardo Ly =

Costa Rican footballer (born 1985)

Personal information
- Full name: Leonardo Ly Rojas
- Date of birth: 14 March 1985 (age 41)
- Place of birth: San Jose, Costa Rica
- Height: 5 ft 8 in (1.73 m)
- Position: Midfielder

Team information
- Current team: San Carlos
- Number: 21

Senior career*
Years	Team	Apps	(Gls)
2010	Municipal Liberia	1	(0)
2010–2011	→ Barrio México (loan)	23	(3)
2011	Puerto Rico Islanders	16	(0)
2012	San Carlos	45	(3)
2013	UCR	16	(0)
- * Club domestic league appearances and goals as of 8 November 2012

Leonardo Ly Rojas (born 14 March 1985) is a Costa Rican footballer who currently plays for UCR.

His ancestors came from China. His last name Ly in Chinese is 李.

== Club career ==
Ly played with Municipal Liberia and Barrio México prior to signing with the Puerto Rico Islanders of the North American Soccer League in 2011. He made his NASL debut on 9 April 2011 in a game against the Carolina RailHawks. He returned to Costa Rica to play for San Carlos but was released in November 2012. Nowadays he works a s a physical education teacher for Centro Educativo Nueva Generación.
