= Matthew Bouraee =

American soccer player

Personal information
- Full name: Matthew Bouraee
- Date of birth: July 29, 1988 (age 38)
- Place of birth: Brooklyn, New York, U.S.
- Height: 6 ft 0 in (1.83 m)
- Positions: Left winger; right full-back

Youth career
- 2006–2009: Cornell Big Red

Senior career*
Years	Team	Apps	(Gls)
2010	New York Red Bull NPSL	14	(12)
2011	Puerto Rico Islanders	15	(4)
2012–2014	Adelaide Comets	57	(19)
2018–2019	West Adelaide	28	(5)
- * Club domestic league appearances and goals as of 26 August 2019

Matthew Bouraee (born July 29, 1988) is an American former soccer player.

== Career ==
=== Youth and college ===
Bouraee attended Wall High School in Wall Township, New Jersey, where he broke the all-time school single season goal record previously held by University of Virginia's current head coach George Gelnovatch. By scoring 31 goals in a single season, Bouraee earned All State First Team and All-Region honors. In his junior season Bouraee helped Wall become the #1 public soccer school in the state by winning a state championship.

Bouraee went on to play four years of college soccer at Cornell University in the Ivy League where he was named to the All Ivy League first team and the All America second team. Bouraee led Cornell in goals and points in all four of his years, and finished as the seventh leading scorer in the history of Cornell.

During his college years, Bouraee was a forward and eventual captain for the New York Red Bull NPSL team.

=== Professional ===
Having spent time training with the New York Red Bulls (USA), Sharjah SC (UAE), Red Bull Salzburg (Austria) and at the Pepsi Football Academy (Egypt), Bouraee signed a contract to play for the Puerto Rico Islanders (Puerto Rico) of the CONCACAF Champions League in January 2011.

In 2012, he signed for FFSA Super League club Adelaide Comets (Australia). In his first season there they won the Carlsberg Cup.

On August 15, 2012, Bouraee made his first appearance playing for South Australia.
