= Richard Martin (footballer, born 1987) =

English footballer (born 1987)

Personal information
- Full name: Richard William Martin
- Date of birth: 1 September 1987 (age 39)
- Place of birth: Chelmsford, England
- Position: Goalkeeper

Youth career
- Brighton & Hove Albion

Senior career*
Years	Team	Apps	(Gls)
2004–2007	Brighton & Hove Albion	0	(0)
2005–2006	→ Kingstonian (loan)	13	(0)
2006	→ Dorchester Town (loan)	11	(0)
2007	→ Folkestone Invicta (loan)	12	(0)
2007–2009	Manchester City	0	(0)
2009	→ Burton Albion (loan)	0	(0)
2009–2010	Yeovil Town	3	(0)
2010	→ Grays Athletic (loan)	3	(0)
2010	Havant & Waterlooville	1	(0)
2010	Crawley Town	0	(0)
2010–2011	Yeovil Town	0	(0)
2011–2012	Puerto Rico Islanders	28	(0)
2013	Whitehawk	2	(0)
2013	Burgess Hill Town	3	(0)
Total		76	(0)
- * Club domestic league appearances and goals

Richard William Martin (born 1 September 1987) is an English former footballer who played as a goalkeeper.

== Career ==
=== England ===
Martin grew up in Liverpool and progressed successfully through the youth ranks at Brighton and was awarded a professional contract in September 2004 on reaching his 17th birthday. During that time, the highly rated 'keeper was a target for a number of premiership clubs including Liverpool with whom he trialled in 2004 and Everton in 2006.

Martin made his first team debut for Brighton in a pre-season friendly against Le Havre AC and went on to feature in four more ties including starts against Oxford United and AFC Bournemouth. During the course of the 2005–06 season, he made fourteen appearances on the substitute bench as the understudy to Irish international Wayne Henderson and also had a successful loan spell at Kingstonian, helping them move from the 18th to seventh position in the league before being recalled by the club.

At the beginning of the 2006–07 season, Martin was sent on a season-long loan to Conference South side Dorchester Town, making eleven appearances and helping Dorchester challenge for a playoff place before being recalled by Brighton after suffering an injury. Martin then went out on loan to Folkestone Invicta at the end of February 2007 and helped the club avoid relegation, playing in every one of their remaining games.

Martin was released at the end of his contract in May 2007, his departure coinciding with that of long time goalkeeping coach John Keeley. In August 2007, two weeks before the start of the new Premiership season Martin, still without a club, was invited to train with Manchester City for a week by goalkeeping coach Eric Steele. However, injuries to Joe Hart and Andreas Isaksson resulted in Martin unexpectedly playing for City that weekend. After impressing in the friendly fixture, Martin was given a month-long contract. Martin continued to impress in subsequent Premier Reserve team fixtures, including a victory over Manchester United. This didn't go unnoticed as City boss Sven-Göran Eriksson saw fit to extend Martin's contract to the end of the season. At the end of the Premier League 2007–08 season, Martin made his Manchester City first team debut in the Pok Oi Charity Cup against a South China Invitational XI.

Martin began the 2008–09 season in new Manchester City manager, Mark Hughes' team as understudy to Joe Hart and Kasper Schmeichel and was given the number 13 shirt for the subsequent Premiership and UEFA Cup campaign. However, a knee injury in September kept him on the sidelines until March 2009. On 17 April 2009, Martin joined Conference National league-leaders Burton Albion on an emergency loan as cover for their two remaining games of the season, after Kevin Poole suffered an injury. After a series of unfortunate injuries during the 2008–09 season, Martin's tenure at Manchester City came to an end.

On 1 July 2009, Martin went on trial with League One side Yeovil Town and went on to appear in four pre-season games before signing a one-year contract prior to the start of the 2009–10 season. Martin made his debut for Yeovil against Bournemouth on 1 September 2009 in the Football League Trophy. His league debut came just under two weeks later on 12 September in Yeovil's 2–2 draw against Stockport County, being called into action after 22 minutes to replace Alex McCarthy who had been sent off. After making three league and two cup appearances during the first half of the 2009–10 season, on 19 January 2010, Martin was loaned out to bottom placed Conference National club Grays Athletic. Martin returned to Yeovil in February were the continued fine form of England U-21 goalkeeper McCarthy limited further first team appearances.

Martin re-signed with Yeovil on 31 December 2010 until the end of the season.

=== North America ===
In March 2011 Martin left Yeovil by mutual consent to sign with the Puerto Rico Islanders of the North American Soccer League. He made his debut for Puerto Rico on 21 May 2011, against the Carolina RailHawks. His second appearance came on 31 July against Montreal Impact at the Saputo Stadium. In this game, Martin produced a breathtaking individual performance making a series of superb saves.

Martin re-signed with the Islanders for the 2012 season establishing himself as first choice between the sticks. He was awarded the NASL Player of the Month award for August 2012. Throughout the course of the season, Martin kept 15 clean sheets in 33 competitive fixtures in the NASL, CFU Club Championship and CONCACAF Champions League.
