= Richard Martinez (footballer) =

American-born Puerto Rican footballer

Personal information
- Full name: Richard Andrew Martinez
- Date of birth: April 2, 1988 (age 38)
- Place of birth: Highland, New York, United States
- Height: 1.75 m (5 ft 9 in)
- Position: Defender

College career
Years	Team	Apps	(Gls)
2006–2009	Hofstra Pride		

Senior career*
Years	Team	Apps	(Gls)
2007–2008	Westchester Flames	24	(0)
2008	San Jose Frogs	3	(0)
2009	Long Island Rough Riders	16	(0)
2010–2012	Puerto Rico Islanders	76	(2)

International career^{‡}
2008–2012	Puerto Rico	16	(0)
- * Club domestic league appearances and goals as of September 30, 2012 ‡ National team caps and goals as of June 16, 2012

Richard Andrew Martinez (born April 2, 1988, in Highland, New York) is an American-born former Puerto Rican footballer.

== Career ==
=== Youth and college ===
Martinez attended Our Lady of Lourdes High School, who he helped to a pair of league championships and one sectional championship, and for whom he scored 42 goals and had 26 assists. He was a four-time All-conference, three-time scholar-athlete selection. He was a member of his region's the Olympic Development Program from 2000 to 2005, won a state cup championship in 2002, and played on the Super-Y League ODP team in 2003 and 2005, before playing college soccer at Hofstra University from 2006 to 2009.

At Hofstra, Martinez was honored by the Colonial Athletic Association with a selection to the All-Rookies Team in 2006, the CAA Second Team in 2007, the CAA First Team and NSCAA-All Southeast Region Team in 2008. In 2009, he was named CAA Defender of the Year, in addition to another appearance on the CAA First Team.

Martinez also played three years in the USL Premier Development League, from 2007 to 2008 for the Westchester Flames, also spent 2008 with the San Jose Frogs and in 2009 for the Long Island Rough Riders.

=== Professional ===
On February 17, 2010, Martinez signed with the Puerto Rico Islanders.

He made his professional debut on April 16, 2010, in a 2010 CFU Club Championship game against Haitian side Racing des Gonaïves, and made his league debut on April 21, 2010, in a 3–1 victory over NSC Minnesota Stars.

He scored his first professional goal in a 2–0 win over Crystal Palace Baltimore. in Bayamon, Puerto Rico. Also, he recorded his first assist in the first leg of 2010 USSF D-2 playoffs in a 2–0 win over the first seeded Rochester Rhinos. During his rookie season in 2010, Martinez played in 55 of 59 games throughout the Caribbean Cup Championships, USSF D-2 League, Concacaf Champions League, and DirecTV SuperCopa, as well as helping the Islanders win their first league championship in the history of the club.

=== International ===
Martinez was called up in January, 2008 to join the Puerto Rico national football team at training camp for the 2010 FIFA World Cup qualification. He would play in the 2–0 victory against Bermuda, which would be Puerto Rico first victory in over 14 years. He would play in 4 more games during that year including the 2–2 draw against Honduras. In 2010, he helped Puerto Rico beat Anguilla 3–1 in the first round of the 2010 Digicel Cup.

== Honors ==
=== Puerto Rico Islanders ===
- USSF Division 2 Pro League Champions (1): 2010
- CFU Club Championship Winner (1): 2010

== Personal life ==
Martinez is the youngest of three children born to Edward and Annette Martinez. He has an older sister named Erika and an older brother named Daniel.
