= Tyler Wilson (footballer) =

American-born Puerto Rican footballer

Personal information
- Full name: Tyler Linden Wilson
- Date of birth: May 26, 1989 (age 37)
- Place of birth: Chino Hills, California, United States
- Height: 5 ft 10 in (1.78 m)
- Position: Midfielder

Youth career
- 2007–2008: Mt. San Antonio College
- 2009–2010: UC Riverside Highlanders

Senior career*
Years	Team	Apps	(Gls)
2011–2012	Puerto Rico Islanders	13	(1)
2013	FC Tucson	1	(0)

International career^{‡}
2010	Puerto Rico U21	2	(0)
2010–2012	Puerto Rico	17	(0)
- * Club domestic league appearances and goals as of October 9, 2012 ‡ National team caps and goals as of October 9, 2012

Tyler Linden Wilson (born May 26, 1989) is an American-born former Puerto Rican international footballer.

== Career ==
=== Club career ===
Wilson signed his first professional contract in March 2011 when he signed with the Puerto Rico Islanders of the North American Soccer League. The Islanders announced on December 27, 2011, that Wilson would return for the 2012 season.

=== International career ===
Wilson made his international debut for Puerto Rico in 2010.

== Personal life ==
Wilson was born in Chino Hills, California. Wilson's uncle is Michael Boulware, who plays American football.
