= Joe Salem (soccer) =

American soccer player

Personal information
- Full name: Joseph Salem
- Date of birth: January 30, 1987 (age 39)
- Place of birth: Akron, Ohio, United States
- Height: 6 ft 1 in (1.85 m)
- Position: Midfielder

Youth career
- Cleveland United

College career
Years	Team	Apps	(Gls)
2005–2009	Tulsa Golden Hurricane		

Senior career*
Years	Team	Apps	(Gls)
2008–2009	Des Moines Menace	23	(4)
2010–2012	Puerto Rico Islanders	26	(0)

Managerial career
- 2012–2014: Louisville Cardinals (asst.)
- 2019: Case Western Reserve Spartans (asst.)
- * Club domestic league appearances and goals as of May 21, 2011

Joe Salem (born January 30, 1987) is an American former soccer player.

== Career ==
=== Youth and college ===
Salem attended St. Vincent – St. Mary High School, where he was named 1st Team All-Tri County as a sophomore and junior and 1st Team All-District as a junior. He played five seasons of club soccer for the Cleveland United club team, leading them team to a US Regional Club runner-up finish and to a Northern Ohio Cup title. He played five years of college soccer at the University of Tulsa, redshirting his freshman year. He received NSCAA/adidas NCAA All-Midwest First Team accolades as a junior in 2008, as well as 1st Team All-Conference USA, Conference USA All-Tournament Team, collegesoccernews.com's National Team of the Week, Conference USA All-Academic Honoree, and University of Tulsa's Student Athlete of the Month. Joe was selected to the MAC Hermann Trophy watch list prior to his senior season, including Preseason Conference USA 1st Team honors. During his time at Tulsa, the Golden Hurricane won 3 consecutive Conference USA Regular Season and Tournament Championships and went to 3 NCAA tournaments, advancing to the Elite 8 in 2009.

During his college years Salem also played with Des Moines Menace in the USL Premier Development League. Joe was selected 1st Team All-Central Conference in 2008 and helped lead the team to the 2009 Heartland Conference Championship and advance to the Elite 8

=== Professional ===
Undrafted out of college, Salem turned professional in 2010 when he signed with the Puerto Rico Islanders of the USSF D2 Pro League. He made his professional debut on April 16, 2010, in a 2010 CFU Club Championship game against Haitian side Racing des Gonaïves, and made his league debut on April 21, 2010, in a game against NSC Minnesota Stars.

== Honors ==
=== Puerto Rico Islanders ===
- CFU Club Championship Winner (1): 2010
