= 2010 CFU Club Championship =

Tournament details
- Dates: 16 March – 8 May
- Teams: 18 (from 10 associations)

Final positions
- Champions: Puerto Rico Islanders (1st title)
- Runners-up: (Trinidad and Tobago) Joe Public
- Third place: (Trinidad and Tobago) San Juan Jabloteh
- Fourth place: (Puerto Rico) Bayamón FC

Tournament statistics
- Matches played: 33
- Goals scored: 123 (3.73 per match)
- Attendance: 34,350 (1,041 per match)
- Top scorer: (Trinidad and Tobago) Kerry Baptiste (9 goals)

The 2010 CFU Club Championship was the 12th edition of the CFU Club Championship, the annual international club football competition in the Caribbean region, held amongst clubs whose football associations are affiliated with the Caribbean Football Union (CFU). The top three teams in the tournament qualified for the 2010–11 CONCACAF Champions League.

== Qualified clubs ==
The following clubs were all entered into the competition.

Association	Team
Bermuda	Devonshire Cougars
Cayman Islands	Elite ‡
Dominica	Bath Estate ‡
Guyana	Defence Force
Guyana	Alpha United
Haiti	Racing Gonaïves
Haiti	Tempête †
Netherlands Antilles	Barber
Netherlands Antilles	Hubentut Fortuna
Puerto Rico	Puerto Rico Islanders †
Puerto Rico	Bayamón FC
Puerto Rico	River Plate
Saint Vincent and the Grenadines	Avenues United
Saint Vincent and the Grenadines	Systems 3
Suriname	Leo Victor
Suriname	WBC
Trinidad and Tobago	Joe Public
Trinidad and Tobago	San Juan Jabloteh †

Notes

- † Three clubs, as the three highest placed finishers of the 2009 CFU Club Championship among the qualified clubs, were awarded a bye into the second round. W Connection, the 2009 CFU champions, did not qualify for the 2010 tournament.
- ‡ Elite SC and Bath Estate withdrew before playing any matches.
- The following CFU member associations did not enter a club into the tournament: Anguilla, Antigua and Barbuda, Aruba, Bahamas, Barbados, British Virgin Islands, Cuba, Dominican Republic, French Guiana, Grenada, Guadeloupe, Jamaica, Martinique, Montserrat, Saint Kitts and Nevis, Saint Lucia, Saint Martin, Sint Maarten, Turks and Caicos Islands, and U.S. Virgin Islands.

== Competition format ==
The competition was initially announced by the CFU to be structures similarly to the previous year, during which several team played two-legged playoffs and other seed teams received byes in the later knockout rounds. However, the format was changed at the 2010 CFU Congress, where it was decided that three rounds of group stages would be used. Also, Haiti, who had not initially entered any clubs into the tournament, added Racing Gonaïves and Tempête. Elite SC from Cayman Islands were also later added. However, Elite SC and Bath Estate later withdrew from the tournament, and Guyana Defence Force were moved to Group D due to travel and immigration difficulties. Those changes reduced Group B to two teams, both of which qualify to the second round.

== First round ==
The top two teams from each group as well as the highest ranked third place team advance to the second round.

=== Group A ===
All matches hosted in Netherlands Antilles.

Team	GP	W	D	L	GF	GA	GD	Pts
(Puerto Rico) River Plate	3	3	0	0	12	2	+10	9
(Haiti) Racing des Gonaïves	3	1	1	1	3	4	−1	4
(Netherlands Antilles) Barber	3	1	0	2	3	6	−3	3
(Netherlands Antilles) Hubentut Fortuna	3	0	1	2	3	9	−6	1

March 16

River Plate (Puerto Rico)	3 – 1	(Haiti) Racing des Gonaïves
Delgado 45'; Ruiz 48', 54'	Report	Clerjuste 77'

Ergilio Hato Stadium, Willemstad, Curaçao
Attendance: 1,200
Referee: Hospedales (Trinidad and Tobago)
March 16

Barber (Netherlands Antilles)	3 – 1	(Netherlands Antilles) Hubentut Fortuna
E. Cassiani 42', 49'; L. Cassiani 75'	Report	Maria 21'

Ergilio Hato Stadium, Willemstad, Curaçao
Attendance: 1,200
Referee: Davis (Trinidad and Tobago)

March 18

Hubentut Fortuna (Netherlands Antilles)	1 – 5	(Puerto Rico) River Plate
L. Trenidad 54'	Report	Delgado 11'; Rojas 45', 90'; Sara 48', 64'

Ergilio Hato Stadium, Willemstad, Curaçao
Attendance: 1,000
Referee: Hospedales (Trinidad and Tobago)
March 18

Barber (Netherlands Antilles)	0 – 1	(Haiti) Racing des Gonaïves
	Report	Clerjuste 66'

Ergilio Hato Stadium, Willemstad, Curaçao
Attendance: 1,000
Referee: Hospedales (Trinidad and Tobago)

March 20

Racing des Gonaïves (Haiti)	1 – 1	(Netherlands Antilles) Hubentut Fortuna
Clerjuste 8'	Report	Maria 40'

Ergilio Hato Stadium, Willemstad, Curaçao
Attendance: 2,800
Referee: Davis (Trinidad and Tobago)
March 20

Barber (Netherlands Antilles)	0 – 4	(Puerto Rico) River Plate
	Report	Sara 11', 75'; Russo 62'; Ruiz 78'

Ergilio Hato Stadium, Willemstad, Curaçao
Attendance: 2,800
Referee: Hospedales (Trinidad and Tobago)

=== Group B ===
All matches hosted in Puerto Rico. Officially, Bayamón FC played as visitor in the first leg.

Team	GP	W	D	L	GF	GA	GD	Pts
(Puerto Rico) Bayamón FC	2	1	1	0	6	2	+4	4
(Saint Vincent and the Grenadines) Systems 3	2	0	1	1	2	6	−4	1

March 27
20:00

Systems 3 (Saint Vincent and the Grenadines)	0 – 4	(Puerto Rico) Bayamón FC
	Report	Waston 21'; Nieves 73'; Robertson 79'; Matos 87'

Juan Ramón Loubriel Stadium, Bayamón
Attendance: 350
Referee: Holder (Cayman Islands)

March 28
18:00

Bayamón FC (Puerto Rico)	2 – 2	(Saint Vincent and the Grenadines) Systems 3
Borrali 37'; Matos 56'	Report	Hazelwood 11'; Oliver 19'

Juan Ramón Loubriel Stadium, Bayamón
Attendance: 200
Referee: Holder (Cayman Islands)

=== Group C ===
All matches hosted in Saint Vincent and the Grenadines.

Team	GP	W	D	L	GF	GA	GD	Pts
(Trinidad and Tobago) Joe Public	3	3	0	0	18	5	+13	9
(Saint Vincent and the Grenadines) Avenues United	3	1	1	1	5	9	−4	4
(Suriname) Leo Victor	3	1	0	2	9	9	0	3
(Bermuda) Devonshire Cougars	3	0	1	2	6	15	−9	1

March 19

Leo Victor (Suriname)	3 – 4	(Trinidad and Tobago) Joe Public
Rijssel 26'; Van Zoolingen 85'; Emanuelson 90+2'	Report	Baptiste 15', 63'; Toussaint 61'; Joseph 79'

Victoria Park, Kingstown
Attendance: 2,700
Referee: Taylor (Barbados)
March 19

Avenues United (Saint Vincent and the Grenadines)	2 – 2	(Bermuda) Devonshire Cougars
George 66'; Francis 88' (pen.)	Report	Zuill 21'; Coddington 41'

Victoria Park, Kingstown
Attendance: 2,700
Referee: Persaud (Guyana)

March 21

Devonshire Cougars (Bermuda)	2 – 5	(Suriname) Leo Victor
Coddington 55'; Steede 90'	Report	Rijssel 29', 45', 79'; Tiendari 43'; Emanuelson 47'

Victoria Park, Kingstown
Attendance: 3,000
Referee: Persaud (Guyana)
March 21

Avenues United (Saint Vincent and the Grenadines)	0 – 6	(Trinidad and Tobago) Joe Public
	Report	Young 7'; Baptiste 47', 68', 75'; Smith 90', 90+1'

Victoria Park, Kingstown
Attendance: 3,500
Referee: Taylor (Barbados)

March 23

Joe Public (Trinidad and Tobago)	8 – 2	(Bermuda) Devonshire Cougars
Toussaint 11'; Joseph 18'; Baptiste 31'; Noel 44'; Tinto 67', 75'; Smith 83', 85'	Report	Tota 46'; Steede 74'

Victoria Park, Kingstown
Attendance: 650
Referee: Persaud (Guyana)
March 23

Avenues United (Saint Vincent and the Grenadines)	3 – 1	(Suriname) Leo Victor
Samuel 21'; Snagg 66', 90'	Report	Emanuelson 31'

Victoria Park, Kingstown
Attendance: 1,500
Referee: Taylor (Barbados)

=== Group D ===
All matches hosted in Guyana.

Team	GP	W	D	L	GF	GA	GD	Pts
(Guyana) Alpha United	2	1	1	0	4	2	+2	4
(Suriname) WBC	2	1	1	0	3	2	+1	4
(Guyana) Defence Force	2	0	0	2	2	5	−3	0

March 26

Defence Force (Guyana)	1 – 2	(Suriname) WBC
Deen 84'	Report	Sastromedjo 15'; Alex 17'

Bourda Cricket Ground, Georgetown
Attendance: 700
Referee: Brizan (Trinidad and Tobago)

March 28

Alpha United (Guyana)	1 – 1	(Suriname) WBC
Browne 40'	Report	Afonsoewa 12'

Bourda Cricket Ground, Georgetown
Attendance: 700
Referee: Brizan (Trinidad and Tobago)

March 30

Alpha United (Guyana)	3 – 1	(Guyana) Defence Force
Ford 38', 65'; Browne 42'	Report

Bourda Cricket Ground, Georgetown
Attendance: 500
Referee: Brizan (Trinidad and Tobago)

== Second round ==
In the second round, only the group winners advance to the final round.

After the completion of the first round, the following changes to the second round have been made:

- Alpha United traded places with Leo Victor, allowing the matches to be staged as schedule by avoiding travel delays due to U.S. restrictions for the Guyanese club.
- The matches in Group E and Group F were postponed due to delays by Haitian clubs Tempete FC and Racing Gonaives in obtaining U.S. visas to travel to Puerto Rico.
- The matches in Group G and Group H were postponed due to stadium availability and were scheduled to begin a day later than previously announced.
- Leo Victor withdrew from Group E for financial reasons, and Tempête was forced to withdraw from Group F following difficulties in obtaining visas to Puerto Rico. Therefore both Group E and F would be played as two-team groups.

=== Group E ===
All matches hosted in Puerto Rico.

Team	GP	W	D	L	GF	GA	GD	Pts
Puerto Rico Islanders	2	2	0	0	5	0	+5	6
(Haiti) Racing des Gonaïves	2	0	0	2	0	5	−5	0

April 16
20:00 UTC−04

Racing des Gonaïves (Haiti)	0 – 2	Puerto Rico Islanders
	Report	Gbandi 7'; Foley 44'

Juan Ramón Loubriel Stadium, Bayamón
Attendance: 500
Referee: Santos (Puerto Rico)

April 18
18:00 UTC−04

Puerto Rico Islanders	3 – 0	(Haiti) Racing des Gonaïves
Hansen 7', 49'; Foley 37'	Report

Juan Ramón Loubriel Stadium, Bayamón
Attendance: 1,300
Referee: Lebron (Puerto Rico)

=== Group F ===
All matches hosted in Puerto Rico.

Team	GP	W	D	L	GF	GA	GD	Pts
(Puerto Rico) Bayamón FC	2	2	0	0	8	2	+6	6
(Saint Vincent and the Grenadines) Avenues United	2	0	0	2	2	8	−6	0

April 13
20:30 UTC−04

Avenues United (Saint Vincent and the Grenadines)	2 – 5	(Puerto Rico) Bayamón FC
Samuel 12', 18'	Report	Elizondo 30'; Waston 33'; Gustave 51', 55', 65'

Juan Ramón Loubriel Stadium, Bayamón
Attendance: 500
Referee: Lebron (Puerto Rico)

April 15
20:00 UTC−04

Bayamón FC (Puerto Rico)	3 – 0	(Saint Vincent and the Grenadines) Avenues United
Elizondo 71', 90'; Waston 89'	Report

Juan Ramón Loubriel Stadium, Bayamón
Attendance: 250
Referee: Santos (Puerto Rico)

=== Group G ===
All matches hosted in Trinidad & Tobago.

Team	GP	W	D	L	GF	GA	GD	Pts
(Trinidad and Tobago) San Juan Jabloteh	2	2	0	0	3	0	+3	6
(Puerto Rico) River Plate	2	0	1	1	1	2	−1	1
(Guyana) Alpha United	2	0	1	1	1	3	−2	1

April 14
20:00 UTC−04

San Juan Jabloteh (Trinidad and Tobago)	2 – 0	(Guyana) Alpha United
Marcano 28', 66'	Report

Marvin Lee Stadium, Macoya, Trinidad
Attendance: 400
Referee: Bogle (Jamaica)

April 16
20:00 UTC−04

Alpha United (Guyana)	1 – 1	(Puerto Rico) River Plate
Abrams 49'	Report	Gonzalez 90'

Marvin Lee Stadium, Macoya, Trinidad
Attendance: 400
Referee: Hospedales (Trinidad and Tobago)

April 18
20:00 UTC−04

San Juan Jabloteh (Trinidad and Tobago)	1 – 0	(Puerto Rico) River Plate
Marcano 65' (pen.)	Report

Larry Gomes Stadium, Malabar, Trinidad
Attendance: 650
Referee: Campbell (Jamaica)

=== Group H ===
All matches hosted in Trinidad & Tobago.

Team	GP	W	D	L	GF	GA	GD	Pts
(Trinidad and Tobago) Joe Public	2	2	0	0	8	1	+7	6
(Suriname) WBC	2	1	0	1	2	5	−3	3
(Saint Vincent and the Grenadines) Systems 3	2	0	0	2	1	5	−4	0

April 14
18:00 UTC−04

Joe Public (Trinidad and Tobago)	5 – 0	(Suriname) WBC
Baptiste 14', 32'; Hoshide 27'; Noel 55'; Toussaint 90'	Report

Marvin Lee Stadium, Macoya, Trinidad
Attendance: 400
Referee: Campbell (Jamaica)

April 16
18:00 UTC−04

WBC (Suriname)	2 – 0	(Saint Vincent and the Grenadines) Systems 3
Afonsoewa 9', 63'	Report

Marvin Lee Stadium, Macoya, Trinidad
Attendance: 400
Referee: Brizan (Trinidad and Tobago)

April 18
18:00 UTC−04

Joe Public (Trinidad and Tobago)	3 – 1	(Saint Vincent and the Grenadines) Systems 3
Baptiste 6'; Noel 42'; Joseph 83'	Report	George 56'

Larry Gomes Stadium, Malabar, Trinidad
Attendance: 650
Referee: Bogle (Jamaica)

== Final round ==
The top three finishers qualify for the preliminary round of the 2010–11 CONCACAF Champions League.

All matches hosted in Trinidad & Tobago.

Team	GP	W	D	L	GF	GA	GD	Pts
Puerto Rico Islanders (C)	3	2	1	0	5	1	+4	7
(Trinidad and Tobago) Joe Public	3	1	1	1	3	4	−1	4
(Trinidad and Tobago) San Juan Jabloteh	3	1	0	2	4	3	+1	3
(Puerto Rico) Bayamón FC	3	1	0	2	4	8	−4	3

May 5
18:00 UTC−04

Puerto Rico Islanders	3 – 0	(Puerto Rico) Bayamón FC
Delgado 7'; Addlery 33'; Hansen 52'	Report

Marvin Lee Stadium, Macoya, Trinidad
Attendance: 300
Referee: Campbell (Jamaica)
May 5
20:00 UTC−04

Joe Public (Trinidad and Tobago)	1 – 0	(Trinidad and Tobago) San Juan Jabloteh
Abu Bakr 50'	Report

Marvin Lee Stadium, Macoya, Trinidad
Attendance: 300
Referee: Bogle (Jamaica)

May 7
18:00 UTC−04

Joe Public (Trinidad and Tobago)	1 – 1	Puerto Rico Islanders
Joseph 51'	Report	Hansen 90'

Marvin Lee Stadium, Macoya, Trinidad
Attendance: 400
Referee: Bogle (Jamaica)
May 7
20:00 UTC−04

San Juan Jabloteh (Trinidad and Tobago)	4 – 1	(Puerto Rico) Bayamón FC
Hinkson 25'; Marcano 55', 90'; Awai 90'	Report	Waston 57'

Marvin Lee Stadium, Macoya, Trinidad
Attendance: 400
Referee: Campbell (Jamaica)

May 9
16:00 UTC−04

San Juan Jabloteh (Trinidad and Tobago)	0 – 1	Puerto Rico Islanders
	Report	Addlery 19'

Marvin Lee Stadium, Macoya, Trinidad
Attendance: 500
Referee: Campbell (Jamaica)
May 9
18:00 UTC−04

Joe Public (Trinidad and Tobago)	1 – 3	(Puerto Rico) Bayamón FC
Abu Bakr 27'	Report	Acevedo 10'; Brown 54'; Waston 60'

Marvin Lee Stadium, Macoya, Trinidad
Attendance: 500
Referee: Bogle (Jamaica)

CFU Club Championship
2010 Winners

Puerto Rico Islanders
First Title

== Top goalscorers ==
Updated for all matches.

Rank	Player	Club	Goals
1	(Trinidad and Tobago) Kerry Baptiste	(Trinidad and Tobago) Joe Public	9
2	(Trinidad and Tobago) Jason Marcano	(Trinidad and Tobago) San Juan Jabloteh	5
2	(Costa Rica) Kendall Waston	(Puerto Rico) Bayamón FC	5
4	(United States) Josh Hansen	Puerto Rico Islanders	4
4	(Trinidad and Tobago) Marcus Joseph	(Trinidad and Tobago) Joe Public	4
4	(Suriname) Stefano Rijssel	(Suriname) Leo Victor	4
4	(Argentina) Juan Sara	(Puerto Rico) River Plate	4
4	(Trinidad and Tobago) Conrad Smith	(Trinidad and Tobago) Joe Public	4
