= David Foley =

English footballer

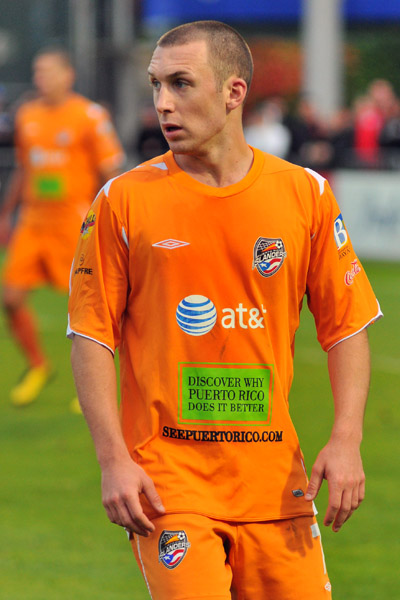
- Foley playing for Puerto Rico Islanders in 2010

Personal information
- Full name: David John Foley
- Date of birth: 12 May 1987 (age 39)
- Place of birth: South Shields, England
- Position: Forward

Youth career
- Hartlepool United

Senior career*
Years	Team	Apps	(Gls)
2003–2010	Hartlepool United	98	(0)
2009	→ Barrow (loan)	3	(0)
2010–2012	Puerto Rico Islanders	74	(24)
2013–2014	Fort Lauderdale Strikers	5	(2)
2015–2017	South Shields	87	(49)
2017–2018	Spennymoor Town	39	(8)
2018–2019	South Shields	37	(14)
- * Club domestic league appearances and goals

David John Foley (born 12 May 1987) is an English footballer. He played in the Football League for Hartlepool United and in the North American Soccer League for the Puerto Rico Islanders and the Fort Lauderdale Strikers.

== Career ==
=== England ===
Foley was trained as a scholar in Hartlepool United's youth academy. As a scholar, he represented the first team on several occasions and became Hartlepool's youngest ever player when he came on as a substitute against Port Vale at the age of 16. Foley also played a key role in Hartlepool's Under 19s Dallas Cup winning team in 2004. During his time at the club Foley failed to score a league goal. However, he was more successful in cup competitions, scoring seven goals, most notably against Premier League side Stoke City which earned Hartlepool a famous 2–0 victory in 2009.

When his first-team appearances started to become limited Foley joined Conference National side Barrow on a month's loan in August 2009, he played three times but failed to score.

=== North America ===
In February 2010 Foley's Hartlepool contract was cancelled so he could join the Puerto Rico Islanders. After playing for the team throughout the 2010 pre-season, he made his debut for the team on 16 April 2010, in a 2010 CFU Club Championship game against Haitian team Racing des Gonaïves.

Foley signed with the Fort Lauderdale Strikers in January 2013. He dressed in 5 games for the club and scored 2 goals before picking up a season-ending injury. On 10 March 2014, the Strikers announced that the club and Foley had officially parted ways by mutual agreement.

=== Return to England ===
After leaving Fort Lauderdale Strikers, Foley returned to England, and in June 2015 he joined hometown club South Shields on a free transfer. He scored on his competitive debut for the club on 8 August, but it was not enough to prevent a 3–2 defeat against Northallerton Town in the Northern League Division Two. He netted again for the Mariners three days later, with his stunning 25-yard volley sealing a 3–2 win against Billingham Town after Shields had earlier found themselves 2–0 down with 12 minutes to play. He also scored in Shields' next game, notching the opener in a 6–0 win over Darlington Railway Athletic. He suffered a hamstring injury against Heaton Stannington on 18 August, and returned as a substitute in a win over Ryhope Colliery Welfare on 6 October.

He went on to play a key part in a successful season for the Mariners, as they gained promotion to Division One of the Northern League as champions.

In June 2017, Foley turned down a new contract at South Shields to join National League North side Spennymoor Town, indicating his desire to play at a higher level. He scored eight league goals in total for Spennymoor. However, on 6 September 2018, Foley re-joined South Shields. On 31 October 2019 it was confirmed, that Foley had left the club for final time due to work commitments.

== Honours ==
=== Club ===
Hartlepool United

- League Two runners-up: 2006–07

Puerto Rico Islanders

- USSF Division 2 Pro League: 2010
- CFU Club Championship: 2010, 2011

South Shields

- Northern League Division Two champions: 2015–16
