= Josh Hansen =

American association football player

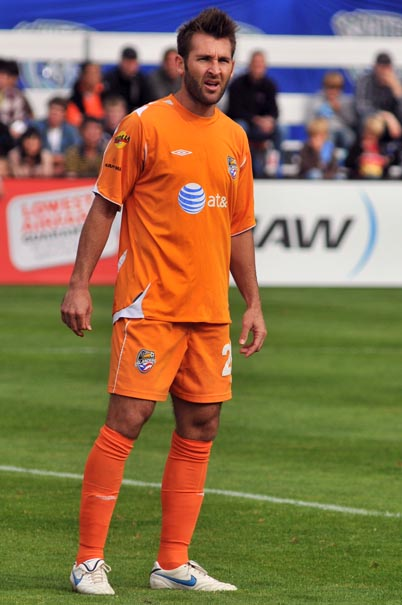
- Hansen with Puerto Rico Islanders in 2010

Personal information
- Full name: Joshua Randolph Hansen
- Date of birth: January 16, 1982 (age 44)
- Place of birth: Phoenix, Arizona, United States
- Height: 5 ft 10 in (1.78 m)
- Positions: Midfielder; forward

College career
Years	Team	Apps	(Gls)
2000–2003	San Francisco Dons		

Senior career*
Years	Team	Apps	(Gls)
2005	Seattle Sounders	0	(0)
2006	Southern California Seahorses	15	(8)
2006	Los Angeles Galaxy	0	(0)
2007	California Victory	20	(6)
2007	Vancouver Whitecaps	8	(0)
2008–2012	Puerto Rico Islanders	85	(16)

International career^{‡}
2010–2012	Puerto Rico	10	(4)
- * Club domestic league appearances and goals as of June 16, 2012 ‡ National team caps and goals as of June 16, 2012

Joshua Randolph Hansen (born January 16, 1982, in Phoenix, Arizona) is an American-born Puerto Rican international football player.

== Career ==
=== College ===
Hansen attended Greenway High School and played four years of college soccer at the University of San Francisco, where he won several honors and his exploits included a hat-trick against Saint Mary's College.

=== Professional ===
Hansen spent 2005 with the championship-winning Seattle Sounders of the USL First Division, but saw little playing time. In an attempt to re-ignite his career, Hansen joined the Southern California Seahorses of the USL Premier Development League in 2006, scoring 8 goals in 15 matches.

On August 30, 2006, following the conclusion of the PDL season. Hansen was signed by the Los Angeles Galaxy, having appeared and scored a goal as a guest player for the Galaxy reserves in a game against the Colorado Rapids reserves earlier in the same month.

Hansen was waived by the Galaxy during the 2007 pre-season, having never played a senior game for the team, and was subsequently signed by the California Victory. He was then transferred to Vancouver Whitecaps FC during the 2007 season. Hansen was waived by the Whitecaps in January 2008. He signed with the Puerto Rico Islanders in the USL First Division in early 2008.

== Honors ==
=== Puerto Rico Islanders ===
- USSF Division 2 Pro League Champions (1): 2010
- Commissioner's Cup Winners (1): 2008
- CFU Club Championship Winner (1): 2010
