= 2009 Puerto Rico Islanders season =

Puerto Rico Islanders
2009 season
- Head coach: Colin Clarke
- USL First Division: 3rd
- Playoffs: Semifinals
- CFU Club Championship: Runners-up
- Champions League (2008–09): Semifinals
- Champions League (2009–10): Group stage

The 2009 season was the sixth and final season for the Puerto Rico Islanders in the USL First Division, the second tier of men's soccer in the United States. The Islanders finished third in the USL standings and qualified for the playoffs, where they were eliminated in the semifinals. The team also participated in two editions of the CONCACAF Champions League, finishing in the semifinals of the 2008–09 edition after a "cinderella run" and the group stage of the 2009–10 edition. The Islanders were also runners-up in the CFU Club Championship, the top competition for clubs in the Caribbean region.

== Club ==
=== Management ===
Position	Staff
Head coach	(Northern Ireland) Colin Clarke
Assistant coach	(England) Adrian Whitbread
GK coach	(United States) Jack Stefanowski

Last updated: February 26, 2009
Source: Islanders FC

=== Kit ===
Supplier: Umbro
Sponsor(s): Centennial de Puerto Rico

Source: Puerto Rico Islanders

== Squad ==
=== First team ===
As of July 4, 2009 Note: Flags indicate national team as defined under FIFA eligibility rules; some limited exceptions apply. Players may hold more than one non-FIFA nationality.

No.	Pos.	Nation	Player
1	GK	PUR	Bill Gaudette
2	MF	USA	Scott Jones
3	MF	HAI	James Marcelin
4	DF	TRI	Nigel Henry
5	MF	PUR	Noah Delgado
6	DF	PUR	Alexis Rivera
7	FW	JAM	Sean Fraser
8	MF	USA	Domenic Mediate
9	MF	URU	Martin Nuñez
10	MF	PUR	Petter Villegas
11	FW	JAM	Nicholas Addlery
12	DF	PUR	John Krause
13	FW	HAI	Fabrice Noël

No.	Pos.	Nation	Player
14	GK	USA	Justin Myers
15	MF	LBR	Sandy Gbandi
16	DF	USA	Kyle Veris
17	MF	PUR	Andrés Cabrero
18	MF	TRI	Osei Telesford
19	DF	TRI	Kevon Villaroel
20	FW	PUR	Josh Hansen
21	DF	COL	Daniel Ojeda
22	MF	NIR	Jonny Steele
23	FW	TRI	Kendall Jagdeosingh
24	MF	USA	Dan Gargan
25	GK	USA	Michael Behonick
26	DF	PUR	Cristian Arrieta

=== 2009 transfers ===
==== In ====
Note: Flags indicate national team as defined under FIFA eligibility rules; some limited exceptions apply. Players may hold more than one non-FIFA nationality.

No.	Pos.	Nation	Player
7	FW	JAM	Sean Fraser (Transfer from Miami FC on a free)
11	FW	JAM	Nicholas Addlery (Transfer from Vancouver Whitecaps FC on a free)
9	MF	URU	Martin Nuñez (Transfer from Carolina Railhawks on a free)
19	DF	TRI	Kevon Villaroel (Transfer from San Juan Jabloteh on a free)

No.	Pos.	Nation	Player
16	DF	USA	Kyle Veris (signed as a free agent)
8	MF	USA	Domenic Mediate (signed as a free agent)
27	GK	USA	Chris McClellan (Transfer from Carolina Railhawks on a free)
24	MF	USA	Dan Gargan (signed as a free agent)

==== Out ====
Note: Flags indicate national team as defined under FIFA eligibility rules; some limited exceptions apply. Players may hold more than one non-FIFA nationality.

No.	Pos.	Nation	Player
14	FW	ENG	Taiwo Atieno (Released)
7	MF	SLV	Edwin Miranda (Released)
13	FW	USA	Kevin Mesa (Released)

No.	Pos.	Nation	Player
8	DF	CMR	William Yomby (transferred to Richmond Kickers)
27	GK	USA	Chris McClellan (Released)
17	MF	PUR	Andrés Cabrero (Resigned)

== Competitions ==
=== Overall ===
Competition	Started position	Current position / round	Final position / round	First match	Last match
CONCACAF Champions League 2008-09	Preliminary round	-	Semifinals	2008-08-27	2009-04-07
USL 1 Regular season	-	1st	-	2009-04-18	2009-09-19
CFU Club Championship 2009	Semifinals	-	Runner-Up	2009-05-15	2009-05-17
CONCACAF Champions League 2009-10	Preliminary round	-	-	2009-07-29	-

=== USL 1 ===
==== Results summary ====
Overall								Home						Away					
Pld	W	D	L	GF	GA	GD	Pts	W	D	L	GF	GA	GD	W	D	L	GF	GA	GD
20	9	7	4	24	18	+6	34	6	3	1	17	10	+7	3	4	3	7	8	−1

Last updated: 2009-02-22.
Source: USL 1

==== Results by match day (regular season) ====
Round	1	2	3	4	5	6	7	8	9	10	11	12	13	14	15	16	17	18	19	20	21	22	23	24	25	26	27	28	29	30
Stadium	H	H	H	A	A	H	H	A	A	H	H	H	H	H	A	A	A	A	A	A	A	A	H	H	H	H	A	A	H	A
Result	W	D	W	D	L	D	L	L	W	W	D	W	W	W	L	W	D	D	D	W	D	L	W							
Position	3	3	4	4	6								1	1	1	1		3	3				4							

Updated to match(es) played on 2009-02-22. Source: Regular season Schedule
A = Away; H = Home; W = Win; D = Draw; L = Loss

* Positions are tabulated at the end of each week.

=== CONCACAF Champions League 2008–2009 ===
==== Championship round (bracket) ====
Quarterfinals
Puerto Rico Islanders	2	1	3
(Honduras) Marathón	1	0	1
(Mexico) Cruz Azul	1	1	2
(Mexico) Universidad Nacional	0	0	0
(Canada) Montreal Impact	2	2	4
(Mexico) Santos Laguna	0	5	5
(United States) Houston Dynamo	1	0	1
(Mexico) Atlante	1	3	4

Semifinals
Puerto Rico Islanders	2	1	3 (2)
(Mexico) Cruz Azul (p)	0	3	3 (4)
(Mexico) Santos Laguna	2	1	3
(Mexico) Atlante	1	3	4

Finals
(Mexico) Cruz Azul
(Mexico) Atlante

== Matches ==
=== Friendlies ===
Match	Date	Tournament	Location	Opponent team	Score	Scorers
1	February 7, 2009	Friendly	Bradenton, Florida	Chicago Fire	1–0	
2	February 9, 2009	Friendly	Bradenton, Florida	New York Red Bulls	0–0	
3	February 12, 2009	Friendly	Bradenton, Florida	Columbus Crew	0–2	Nuñez 1', Delgado 13'
4	February 13, 2009	Friendly	Bradenton, Florida	University of South Florida	2–3	Hansen 17' (pen.), Fraser 65', 70'
5	February 21, 2009	Puerto Rico MLS-USL Challenge	Bayamón, Puerto Rico	D.C. United	1–2	Arrieta 89' (pen.)
6	February 22, 2009	Friendly	Bayamón, Puerto Rico	D.C. United	0–0	
7	March 13, 2009	Friendly	Bayamón, Puerto Rico	Sevilla FC Puerto Rico	0–0	
8*	April 3, 2009	Friendly	Austin, Texas	Austin Aztex	0–0	

* A round of penalty kicks was played after the match, this was already agreed upon by both sides regardless of the match's outcome, Austin won this 3-0.

=== USL-1 regular season ===
All kickoff times are in EST. Names in brackets are players who were awarded the assist for the goal.

April 18, 2009
19:00

Islanders	2–1	Whitecaps
Addlery (Delgado) 6', (Arrieta) 38'; Marcelin (yellow card) 80'	(Report)	Haber (Bellisimo) 2'; Orgill (yellow card) 79'

Estadio Juan Ramon Loubriel, Bayamón
Attendance: 5,250
Referee:
Bryan Roslund
Antonio Lopez
William Ardenson
Daniel Santos

April 24, 2009
20:00

Islanders	0–0	Rhinos
Noel (yellow card) 78'; Arrieta (yellow card) 84'	(Report)	Heins (yellow card) 17'; Nurse (yellow card) 42'; Kenton (yellow card) 77'

Estadio Juan Ramon Loubriel, Bayamón
Attendance: 4,078
Referee:
Carlos Sandoval
Luis Santos
Juan Perez
Jesus Lebron

May 2, 2009
20:00

Islanders	3–2	Impact
Krause (Gbandi) 38'; Gbandi (Arrieta) 60'; Addlery (yellow card) 68'; Jagdeosingh (Noel) 81'; Jagdeosingh (yellow card) 87'	(Report)	Sakuda (Di Lorenzo) 26'; Braz (yellow card) 56'; Gjertsen (Placentino) 76'; Brown (yellow card) 79'

Estadio Juan Ramon Loubriel, Bayamón
Attendance: 4,022
Referee:
Toni Russo
William Anderson
Alex Villareal
Jesus Lebron

May 8, 2009
20:00

Aztex	1–1	Islanders
Alvarez (Johnson) 67'	(Report)	Jagdeosingh (yellow card) 14'; Arrieta 39'

Nelson Field, Austin
Attendance: 5,216
Referee:
Tyler Ploeger
Matthew Foerester
Masoud Rasti
Carlos Salas

May 10, 2009
22:00

Whitecaps	1–0	Islanders
Toure (yellow card) 12'; Knight (yellow card) 42'; Gbeke (Knight) 82'	(Report)	Veris (yellow card) 89'

Swangard Stadium, Burnaby
Attendance: 5,023
Referee:
John Oliva
Kevin Duliba
Cameron Blair
Mauricio Navarro

=== CONCACAF Champions League 2008-09 ===
Match	Date	Home/Away	Opponent team	Score	Scorers
1	February 26, 2009	Home	C.D. Marathón	2–1	Addlery 73', Jagdeosingh 81'
2	March 4, 2009	Away	C.D. Marathón	0–1	Addlery 90'
3	March 17, 2009	Home	C.D.S.C. Cruz Azul	2–0	Gbandi 4', Addlery 37'
4	April 7, 2009	Away	C.D.S.C. Cruz Azul	1–3(aet)(4–2 pen.)	Gbandi 92', Arrieta (pen.), Jagdeosingh (pen.)

=== CFU Club Championship 2009 ===
Match	Date	Stadium	Opponent team	Score	Scorers
1	May 15, 2009	Marvin Lee Stadium	Tempête Football Club	2–0 (aet)	Jagdeosingh 102', Villegas 114'
2	May 17, 2009	Marvin Lee Stadium	W Connection	1–2	Nuñez 35'

=== CONCACAF Champions League 2009-2010 ===
Match	Date	Stadium	Opponent team	Score	Scorers
1	July 29, 2009	BMO Field	Toronto FC	-	
2	August 4, 2009	Juan Ramon Loubriel Stadium	Toronto FC	-	

== Squad statistics ==
Competitive matches only. Numbers in brackets indicate appearances as a substitute under the Appearance column and number of assists under the Goal column.
Updated to games played June 20, 2009.

=== Players ===
Number	Position	Name	USL1 Regular season		USL-1 Playoffs		CONCACAF Champions League 2008-09		CFU Club Championship		Total	
Number	Position	Name	Apps	Goals	Apps	Goals	Apps	Goals	Apps	Goals	Apps	Goals
2	DF	(United States) Scott Jones	12 (0)	0 (1)	-	-	4 (0)	0	1 (0)	0	17 (0)	0 (1)
3	MF	(Haiti) James Marcelin	6 (4)	0 (0)	-	-	3 (0)	0	1 (0)	0	10 (4)	0 (0)
4	DF	(Trinidad and Tobago) Nigel Henry	12 (0)	0 (0)	-	-	4 (0)	0	2 (0)	0	18 (0)	0 (0)
5	MF	(Puerto Rico) Noah Delgado	8 (3)	0 (1)	-	-	4 (0)	0	1 (0)	0	13 (3)	0 (1)
6	DF	(Puerto Rico) Alexis Rivera Curet	1 (3)	0 (0)	-	-	0 (2)	0	1 (0)	0	2 (5)	0 (0)
7	FW	(Jamaica) Sean Fraser	7 (3)	2 (0)	-	-	-	-	2 (0)	0	9 (3)	2 (0)
8	MF	(United States) Domenic Mediate	5 (3)	1 (0)	-	-	0 (1)	0	-	-	5 (4)	1 (0)
9	MF	(Uruguay) Martin Nuñez	2 (5)	0 (0)	-	-	1 (0)	0	1 (0)	1	4 (5)	1 (0)
10	MF	(Puerto Rico) Petter Villegas	9 (2)	0 (1)	-	-	1 (1)	0	1 (1)	1	11 (4)	1 (1)
11	FW	(Jamaica) Nicholas Addlery	6 (3)	4 (0)	-	-	4 (0)	3	1 (0)	0	11 (3)	7 (0)
12	DF	(United States) John Krause	13 (1)	3 (0)	-	-	4 (0)	0	2 (0)	0	19 (1)	3 (0)
13	FW	(Haiti) Fabrice Noel	2 (7)	0 (3)	-	-	-	-	1 (1)	0	3 (8)	0 (3)
15	MF	(Liberia) Sandi Gbandi	10 (2)	1 (2)	-	-	4 (0)	2	1 (0)	0	15 (2)	3 (2)
16	DF	(United States) Kyle Veris	6 (5)	0 (1)	-	-	1 (1)	0	1 (0)	0	8 (6)	0 (1)
17	MF	(Puerto Rico) Andrés Cabrero	4 (1)	0 (0)	-	-	-	-	1 (0)	0	5 (1)	0 (0)
18	MF	(Trinidad and Tobago) Osei Telesford	-	-	-	-	0 (1)	0	-	-	0 (1)	0 (0)
19	DF	(Trinidad and Tobago) Kevon Villaroel	2 (4)	0 (0)	-	-	0 (1)	0	1 (0)	0	3 (5)	0 (0)
20	FW	(United States) Josh Hansen	5 (5)	0 (0)	-	-	3 (1)	0	1 (0)	0	9 (6)	0 (0)
21	DF	(Colombia) Daniel Ojeda	-	-	-	-	-	-	-	-	-	-
22	MF	(Northern Ireland) Jonny Steele	9 (0)	2 (1)	-	-	2 (0)	0	1 (0)	0	12 (0)	2 (1)
23	FW	(Trinidad and Tobago) Kendall Jagdeosingh	8 (6)	2 (0)	-	-	1 (3)	1	0 (2)	1	9 (11)	4 (0)
26	DF	(Italy) Cristian Arrieta	13 (1)	6 (3)	-	-	4 (0)	0	1 (0)	0	18 (1)	11 (3)

=== Goalkeepers ===
Number	Position	Name	USL-1 Regular season				USL-1 Playoffs				CONCACAF Champions League				CFU Club Championship				Total			
Number	Position	Name	Apps	GA	GAA	CKM	Apps	GA	GAA	CKM	Apps	GA	GAA	CKM	Apps	GA	GAA	CKM	Apps	GA	GAA	CKM
1	GK	(United States) Bill Gaudette	20 (0)	18	0.900	1800	-	-	-	-	4 (0)	4	1.000	360	1	0	0.000	90	25 (0)	22	0.880	2250
14	GK	(United States) Justin Myers	-	-	-	-	-	-	-	-	-	-	-	-	-	-	-	-	-	-	-	-
31	GK	(United States) Chris McClellan	-	-	-	-	-	-	-	-	-	-	-	-	1	2	2.000	-	1(0)	2	2.000	0

=== Disciplinary record ===
Only players with at least one card included.

Updated to games played May 15, 2009.

Number	Position	Name	USL-1 Regular season		USL-1 Playoffs		CONCACAF Champions League		CFU Club Championship		Total	
Number	Position	Name	Booked	Sent off (straight red)	Booked	Sent off (straight red)	Booked	Sent off (straight red)	Booked	Sent off (straight red)	Booked	Sent off (straight red)
3	MF	(Haiti) James Marcelin	1	0	0	0	2	0	0	0	3	0
5	MF	(Puerto Rico) Noah Delgado	0	0	0	0	1	0	0	0	1	0
10	MF	(Puerto Rico) Petter Villegas	0	0	0	0	1	0	0	0	1	0
11	FW	(Jamaica) Nicholas Addlery	1	0	0	0	1	0	0	0	2	0
12	DF	(United States) John Krause	0	0	0	0	0	0	1	0	1	0
13	FW	(Haiti) Fabrice Noel	1	0	0	0	0	0	0	0	1	0
15	MF	(Liberia) Sandy Gbandi	0	0	0	0	0	0	1	0	1	0
16	DF	(United States) Kyle Veris	1	0	0	0	1	0	0	0	2	0
19	DF	(Trinidad and Tobago) Kevon Villaroel	0	0	0	0	1	0	0	0	1	0
20	FW	(United States) Josh Hansen	0	0	0	0	1	0	0	0	1	0
23	FW	(Trinidad and Tobago) Kendall Jagdeosingh	2	0	0	0	0	0	0	0	2	0
26	DF	(Italy) Cristian Arrieta	1	0	0	0	1	0	0	0	1	0
		TOTALS	7	0	0	0	9	0	2	0	18	0
