= 2008 Puerto Rico Islanders season =

Puerto Rico Islanders
2008 Season
Manager	Colin Clarke
League position	1st
Playoffs	Runner Up
CFU Club Championship	3rd
CONCACAF Champions League 2008–09	Semi-Finals
$\leftarrow$ Previous season 2007	Next season $\rightarrow$ 2009

The 2008 season is the Puerto Rico Islanders 5th season in the USL First Division. This article shows player statistics and all matches (official and friendly) that the club had during the 2008 season. It also includes matched played in 2008 for the CONCACAF Champions League 2008–09.

== Club ==
=== Management ===
Position	Staff
Head coach	(Northern Ireland) Colin Clarke
Assistant coach	(England) Adrian Whitbread
GK coach	(United States) Jack Stefanowski

Last updated: February 26, 2009
Source: Islanders FC

=== Kit ===
Supplier: Torino
Sponsor(s): Centennial de Puerto Rico

Home	Away	Alternate

Source: PR Islanders

== Competitions ==
=== Overall ===
Competition	Started position	Current position / round	Final position / round	First match	Last match
CONCACAF Champions League 2008-09	Preliminary round	-	Semifinals	2008-08-27	2009-04-07
USL 1 Regular season	-	-	1st	2008-04-17	2008-09-21
USL 1 Playoffs	Semi-Finals	-	Runner Up	2008-10-03	2008-10-12

=== USL 1 ===
==== Results summary ====
Overall								Home						Away					
Pld	W	D	L	GF	GA	GD	Pts	W	D	L	GF	GA	GD	W	D	L	GF	GA	GD
33	16	9	8	47	27	+20	57	9	4	3	27	13	+14	7	5	5	20	14	+6

Last updated: 2009-02-22.
Source: USL 1 2008 Archives

==== Results by round (regular season) ====
Round	1	2	3	4	5	6	7	8	9	10	11	12	13	14	15	16	17	18	19	20	21	22	23	24	25	26	27	28	29	30
Stadium	A	H	H	H	H	H	A	H	A	H	H	A	A	A	A	A	A	H	H	H	A	A	A	H	A	H	H	A	H	A
Result	L	L	W	L	D	D	D	W	L	W	W	L	W	W	W	W	W	L	W	W	D	W	D	W	D	D	W	W	D	D

Updated to match(es) played on 2009-02-22. Source: Regular season Schedule
A = Away; H = Home; W = Win; D = Draw; L = Loss

==== Result by brackets (Playoffs) ====
Teams will be re-seeded for semifinal matchups

Quarterfinals; September 26/28
1	Puerto Rico Islanders
bye
4	Rochester Rhinos	2	0	2
5	Charleston Battery	0	1	1
3	Montreal Impact	1	3	4
6	Seattle Sounders	2	1	3
2	Vancouver Whitecaps	2	3	5
7	Minnesota Thunder	0	4	4

Semifinals; October 3/5
1	Puerto Rico Islanders (AET)	0	3	3
4	Rochester Rhinos	2	0	2
2	Vancouver Whitecaps	0	2	2
3	Montreal Impact	1	0	1

Final; October 12
1	Puerto Rico Islanders	1
2	Vancouver Whitecaps	2
