= 2008–09 CONCACAF Champions League championship round =

The 2008–09 CONCACAF Champions League championship round began on 24 February 2009. The draw for the championship round was held on 10 December 2008. In each round, teams will play their opponent once at home and once away. The four group winners from the group stage will play the second leg at home in the quarterfinals. The order of the home and away matches for the semifinals and finals were determined in the draw.

In all rounds, if two teams are tied after both legs the team with the most away goals is the winner. If the two teams are also tied in away goals, then two fifteen-minute halves of extra time are played. If the two teams are still tied in total goals after extra time, a penalty shootout determines the winner.

== Bracket ==
Quarterfinals
Puerto Rico Islanders | 2 | 1 | 3
(Honduras) Marathón | 1 | 0 | 1
(Mexico) Cruz Azul | 1 | 1 | 2
(Mexico) UNAM | 0 | 0 | 0
(Canada) Montreal Impact | 2 | 2 | 4
(Mexico) Santos Laguna | 0 | 5 | 5
(United States) Houston Dynamo | 1 | 0 | 1
(Mexico) Atlante | 1 | 3 | 4

Semifinals
Puerto Rico Islanders | 2 | 1 | 3 (2)
(Mexico) Cruz Azul (p) | 0 | 3 | 3 (4)
(Mexico) Santos Laguna | 2 | 1 | 3
(Mexico) Atlante | 1 | 3 | 4

Finals
(Mexico) Cruz Azul | 0 | 0 | 0
(Mexico) Atlante | 2 | 0 | 2

== Quarterfinals ==
The first legs of the quarterfinals were played from 24 February 2009 to 26 February 2009, while the second legs were played from 3 March 2009 to 5 March 2009.

| Team 1 | Agg. | Team 2 | 1st leg | 2nd leg |
|---|---|---|---|---|
| Houston Dynamo (United States) | 1–4 | (Mexico) Atlante | 1–1 | 0–3 |
| Montreal Impact (Canada) | 4–5 | (Mexico) Santos Laguna | 2–0 | 2–5 |
| Puerto Rico Islanders | 3–1 | Marathón | 2–1 | 1–0 |
| Cruz Azul (Mexico) | 2–0 | (Mexico) UNAM | 1–0 | 1–0 |

=== First leg ===
24 February 2009
21:00 (UTC-6)

| Houston Dynamo (United States) | 1–1 | (Mexico) Atlante |
|---|---|---|
| Boswell 30' | (Report) | Pereyra 82' |

Robertson Stadium, Houston
Attendance: 10,203
Referee: Neal Brizan (Trinidad and Tobago)

25 February 2009
20:00 (UTC-5)

| Montreal Impact (Canada) | 2–0 | (Mexico) Santos Laguna |
|---|---|---|
| Sebrango 5', 77' | (Report) |

Olympic Stadium, Montreal
Attendance: 55,571
Referee: Terry Vaughn (United States)

25 February 2009
21:00 (UTC-6)

| Cruz Azul (Mexico) | 1–0 | (Mexico) UNAM |
|---|---|---|
| Lozano 5' | (Report) |

Estadio Azul, Mexico City
Attendance: 12,000
Referee: Wálter Quesada (Costa Rica)

26 February 2009
21:00 (UTC-4)

| Puerto Rico Islanders | 2–1 | (Honduras) Marathón |
|---|---|---|
| Addlery 74'; Jagdeosingh 80' | (Report) | Palacios 41' |

Estadio Juan Ramón Loubriel, Bayamón
Attendance: 3,500
Referee: Courtney Campbell (Jamaica)

=== Second leg ===
3 March 2009
21:00 (UTC-6)

| Atlante (Mexico) | 3–0 | (United States) Houston Dynamo |
|---|---|---|
| Navarro 24'; Márquez 37'; Maldonado 90' | (Report) |

Estadio Andrés Quintana Roo, Cancún
Attendance: 10,000
Referee: Silviu Petrescu (Canada)

Atlante won 4–1 on aggregate.

4 March 2009
19:00 (UTC-6)

| Marathón (Honduras) | 0–1 | Puerto Rico Islanders |
|---|---|---|
| | (Report) | Addlery 90' |

Estadio Olímpico Metropolitano, San Pedro Sula
Attendance: 8,000
Referee: Elmar Rodas (Guatemala)

Puerto Rico Islanders won 3–1 on aggregate.

4 March 2009
21:00 (UTC-6)

| UNAM (Mexico) | 0–1 | (Mexico) Cruz Azul |
|---|---|---|
| | (Report) | Riveros 86' |

Estadio Olímpico Universitario, Mexico City
Attendance: 19,721
Referee: Joel Aguilar (El Salvador)

Cruz Azul won 2–0 on aggregate.

5 March 2009
21:00 (UTC-6)

| Santos Laguna (Mexico) | 5–2 | (Canada) Montreal Impact |
|---|---|---|
| Benítez 16'; Vuoso 52', 75'; Quintero 90+2', 90+5' | (Report) | Brown 24'; Sebrango 38' |

Estadio Corona, Torreón
Attendance: 12,000
Referee: Roberto Moreno (Panama)

Santos Laguna won 5–4 on aggregate.

== Semifinals ==
The first legs of the semifinals were played on 17 March and 18 March 2009, while the second legs were played on 7 April and 8 April 2009.

| Team 1 | Agg. | Team 2 | 1st leg | 2nd leg |
|---|---|---|---|---|
| Puerto Rico Islanders | 3–3 (2–4 p) | (Mexico) Cruz Azul | 2–0 | 1–3 (a.e.t.) |
| Santos Laguna (Mexico) | 3–4 | (Mexico) Atlante | 2–1 | 1–3 |

=== First leg ===
17 March 2009
20:00 (UTC-4)

| Puerto Rico Islanders | 2–0 | (Mexico) Cruz Azul |
|---|---|---|
| Gbandi 4'; Addlery 37' | (Report) |

Estadio Juan Ramón Loubriel, Bayamón
Attendance: 12,751
Referee: Neal Brizan (Trinidad and Tobago)

18 March 2009
20:00 (UTC-6)

| Santos Laguna (Mexico) | 2–1 | (Mexico) Atlante |
|---|---|---|
| Quintero 6', 75' | (Report) | Pereyra 35' |

Estadio Corona, Torreón
Attendance: 7,500
Referee: Wálter Quesada (Costa Rica)

=== Second leg ===
7 April 2009
21:00 (UTC-5)

| Cruz Azul (Mexico) | 3–1 (a.e.t.) | Puerto Rico Islanders |
|---|---|---|
| Zeballos 44'; Orozco 84'; Villaluz 99' | (Report) | Gbandi 92' |
Penalties
| Zeballos (penalty scored); Andrade (penalty scored); Torrado (penalty scored); Lugo (penalty missed); Orozco (penalty scored) | 4–2 | (penalty scored) Arrieta; (penalty missed) Delgado; (penalty scored) Jagdeosingh; (penalty missed) Krause |

Estadio Azul, Mexico City
Attendance: 6,928
Referee: Paul Ward (Canada)

3–3 on aggregate. Cruz Azul won 4–2 on penalties.

8 April 2009
21:00 (UTC-5)

| Atlante (Mexico) | 3–1 | (Mexico) Santos Laguna |
|---|---|---|
| Rey 41'; Maldonado 73'; Márquez 90+4' (pen.) | (Report) | Vuoso 67' |

Estadio Andrés Quintana Roo, Cancún
Attendance: 12,000
Referee: Mark Geiger (United States)

Atlante won 4–3 on aggregate.

== Final ==
The two-legged final was played on 22 April and 12 May 2009. The second leg was originally scheduled for 29 April, but was postponed until 12 May by CONCACAF due to concerns over an outbreak of swine flu in Mexico.

| Team 1 | Agg. | Team 2 | 1st leg | 2nd leg |
|---|---|---|---|---|
| Cruz Azul (Mexico) | 0–2 | (Mexico) Atlante | 0–2 | 0–0 |

=== First leg ===
22 April 2009
21:00 (UTC-6)

| Cruz Azul (Mexico) | 0–2 | (Mexico) Atlante |
|---|---|---|
| | | Navarro 17'; Bermúdez 25' |

Estadio Azul, Mexico City
Referee: Marco Rodríguez (Mexico)

=== Second leg ===
12 May 2009
21:00 (UTC-6)

| Atlante (Mexico) | 0–0 | (Mexico) Cruz Azul |

Estadio Andrés Quintana Roo, Cancún
Referee: Benito Archundia (Mexico)

Atlante won 2–0 on aggregate.

CONCACAF Champions League
2009 Champion

Atlante
Second Title
