= Bill Gaudette =

Puerto Rican footballer (born 1981)

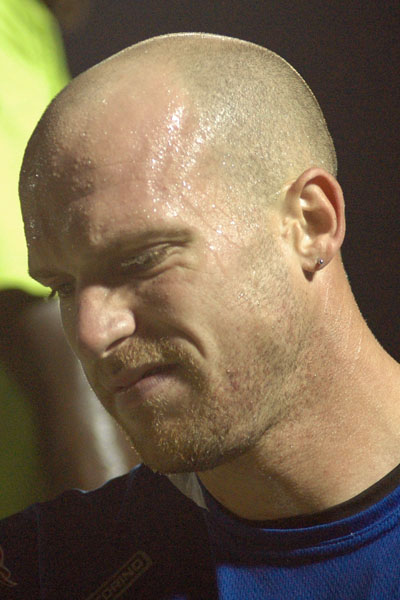

Personal information
- Full name: William Gaudette
- Date of birth: September 14, 1981 (age 45)
- Place of birth: Hummelstown, Pennsylvania, U.S.
- Height: 6 ft 2 in (1.88 m)
- Position: Goalkeeper

College career
Years	Team	Apps	(Gls)
2000–2004	St. John's Red Storm		

Senior career*
Years	Team	Apps	(Gls)
2003	Brooklyn Knights	15	(0)
2005–2007	Columbus Crew	17	(0)
2008–2010	Puerto Rico Islanders	81	(0)
2011	Montreal Impact	9	(0)
2012	Los Angeles Galaxy	3	(0)
2012	New York Red Bulls	12	(0)

International career^{‡}
2012	Puerto Rico	5	(0)
- * Club domestic league appearances and goals as of 01:20, 2 October 2012 (UTC) ‡ National team caps and goals as of June 2, 2012

William Gaudette (born September 14, 1981) is an American retired-born Puerto Rican footballer who played for several MLS teams and the Puerto Rican national team.

Gaudette commenced his soccer career at Lower Dauphin High School, period in which he had the opportunity to train with a talented Brazilian host brother before matriculating onto St. John's University at the college level and becoming an All-American. Also suiting up for the Brooklyn Knights of the USL Premier Development League during the collegiate off-season. After an exceptional career at St. John's, the Columbus Crew selected him 9th overall in the 2005 MLS Draft. His tenure with the Crew saw him serve primarily as backup to Jon Busch due to injury.

In 2008, Gaudette was transferred to the Puerto Rico Islanders of the USL First Division, where he would transform himself into an elite goalkeeper in North America. His contributions led the club to its first regular season championship, as well as leading the Islanders to the playoff finals. His crucial performances in the CONCACAF Champions League provided Puerto Rico with stunning results over regional powerhouses. In February 2010 he was ranked 17th in the USL First Division Top 25 of the Decade, which announced a list of the best and most influential USL players of the previous decade.

== Career ==
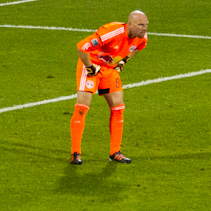
Bill Gaudette vs Montreal 2012

=== College and amateur ===
Gaudette played college soccer at St. John's University from 2001 to 2004, where he finished with a 43–13–12 record. During this period, he also played for the Brooklyn Knights of the USL Premier Development League during the collegiate off-season.

=== Professional ===
Gaudette was drafted in the first round, 9th overall, by Columbus Crew in the 2005 MLS Draft and was part of the team through the 2007 season. He was acquired by Puerto Rico Islanders as their head goalkeeper in early 2008. Gaudette was brought in by Colin Clarke in Clarke's attempt to re-shape the club ahead of the 2008 campaign. During the season, Gaudette made a notable appearance for the Islanders during a match he started against the Rochester Rhinos. Throughout the entire game he was able to shut out the Rhinos in a 4–0 victory for Puerto Rico. It was a memorable victory because it placed the club atop the league's standings for the first time in the club's history. In the final stages of the season, Gaudette managed to assist the club in remaining at the top of the standings. On September 19, Puerto Rico won the club's first Commissioners Cup since their creation, clinching first place in the league's regular season standings. At the end of the 2008 regular season Gaudette had a GAA of 0.851; he also had 10 shutouts and finished as the league's leader in victories with 14. On September 30, 2008, he received the Goalkeeper of the Year award and was selected into the USL First Division All-League First Team. In the club's playoff run, he led the Islanders to the USL 1 Division final only to be defeated by Vancouver Whitecaps by a score of 2–1.

It was in the 2008–09 CONCACAF Champions League where Gaudette established himself as a top-notch goalkeeper in the CONCACAF region, as the Islanders would eventually reach the semi-finals of the tournament due to his first-rate performance. In the preliminary round the Islanders were matched up against regional powerhouse L.D. Alajuelense where in both legs, Gaudette performed well and helped Puerto Rico advance to the group stage. While in the group stage the Islanders managed a victory over Club Santos Laguna, where once again Gaudette's performance led to a 3–1 result. Gaudette led the Islanders to the semi-finals where their opponents were C.D.S.C. Cruz Azul. In the first leg match he earned a shutout victory over the Mexican side, as the Islanders defeated Cruz Azul two goals to none. On the second leg, Cruz Azul won 2–0 and drove the game into extra time, where it ended 3–1. The game was decided through penalties and ended 4–2 in favor of Cruz Azul.

During the 2009 season, he finished with 15 wins, which tied him for the league lead with Steve Cronin, placed fifth in the league in goals against average at 0.74, and recorded 12 shutouts to tie for the league lead with Dusty Hudock. On September 29, 2009, he was selected into the USL First Division All-League Second Team. On April 1, 2010, Gaudette signed a new contract with Puerto Rico for the 2010 season.

Gaudette signed a one-year contract with Montreal Impact of the North American Soccer League on February 19, 2011.

On February 29, 2012, Gaudette signed with Los Angeles Galaxy of Major League Soccer. His debut was against FC Dallas in a 1–1 draw. In his second match against Seattle Sounders FC, Gaudette made 4 saves in a 0–2 defeat. His third match for Los Angeles was a 0–1 defeat to New York Red Bulls. This proved to be his final match for the club. On July 13, Gaudette was traded to New York for a 2014 Supplemental Draft pick. On November 15, Gaudette was denied a contract extension, thus ending his tenure in New York. In December, he entered the 2012 MLS Re-Entry Draft and became a free agent after going undrafted in both rounds of the draft.

=== International ===
On May 27, 2012, Gaudette was called up by Puerto Rico for the team's friendly matches against Nicaragua on June 1 and June 3. In his first game as goalkeeper, Puerto Rico defeated Nicaragua 3–1.

On August 19, 2012, Gaudette was called up again for a friendly match against world and European champion Spain. Gaudette presented an outstanding display defending the goal where, out of 19 shots on target, only 2 went in. The match finished 2–1 in favor of Spain.

In October 2012, he played two more matches with Puerto Rico on the first round of the Caribbean Cup helping Puerto Rico to get two victories (2–1 against Bermuda and 9–0 against Saint Martin).

== Honors ==
Puerto Rico Islanders

- USSF Division 2 Pro League: 2010
- Commissioner's Cup: 2008
- CFU Club Championship: 2010

Individual

- USL First Division Goalkeeper of the Year: 2008
