= Jorge Oscar Rosa =

Puerto Rican football manager

Jorge Rosa
Personal information
- Full name: Jorge Óscar Rosa Lugardo
- Date of birth: May 16, 1965 (age 61)
- Place of birth: Puerto Rico

Managerial career
- Years: Team
- 1992: Puerto Rico
- 2026-: San Juan FC (GK Coach)

Jorge Oscar Rosa is a Puerto Rican professional football manager.

== Career ==
In 1992, he coached the Puerto Rico national football team in the 1994 FIFA World Cup qualification tournament. For the opening match of the qualification cycle, Puerto Rico played the Dominican Republic on March 21, 1992 at Estadio Olímpico Félix Sánchez. The team won the first leg, 2-1 with goals from Marcos Lugris and Ramiro Borja. The second game against DR was played on March 29th, the team took a draw with a score 1-1. Advancing the team to the second preliminary round with a 3–2 on aggregate. The team would then lose to Jamaica 3–1 on aggregate.

On November 28, 2016, Caguas Sporting FC announced Rosa as the new manager.
