= Away goals rule =

Method of breaking ties in sports

The away goals rule is a method of tiebreaking in association football and other sports when teams play each other twice, once at each team's home ground. It was introduced by UEFA in the 1965–66 European Cup Winners' Cup.

Under the away goals rule, if the total goals scored by each team are equal, the team that has scored more goals "away from home" wins the tiebreaker. This is sometimes expressed by saying that away goals "count double" in the event of a tie, though in practice the team with more away goals is simply recorded as the victor, rather than having additional or 'double' goals added to their total.

The away goals rule is most often invoked in two-leg fixtures, where the initial result is determined by the aggregate score — i.e. the scores of both games are added together. In many competitions, the away goals rule is the first tie-breaker in such cases, with a penalty shootout as the second tie-breaker if each team has scored the same number of away goals. Rules vary as to whether the away goals rule applies only to the end of normal time of the second leg, or applies in extra time as well.

Since the early 2020s in association football, the application of the away goals rule has been repeatedly scrutinized and ultimately abolished in numerous competitions. There is empirical evidence that the away goals rule reduces the total number of goals scored during the match and benefits visiting teams in the second leg due to the different perceptions of risk in the first leg and the second leg. There are two other commonly cited reasons for the abandonment of the rule. One is the fact of away goals being an anachronism of 1960s football when the allocation of stadium capacity specifically for travelling away supporters did not exist as a practice, which is no longer the case with more widely available modes of transportation and ease of travel for supporters. Another more unsportsmanlike reason is the fact that, in the event of extra time at the end of the second leg, the away team unfairly benefits from extra time to score a more valuable away goal. The away goals rule was abolished in all UEFA club competitions from the 2021–22 season, all CONMEBOL club competitions from the 2022 season, then in all AFC club competitions from the 2023–24 season.

== Explanation ==
Example 1:

- In the first leg, the final score is: Team A (Home) 1–0 Team B (Away).
- In the second leg, the final score is: Team B (Home) 1–0 Team A (Away).

In this example, the aggregate score is 1–1, but as neither team scored an away goal, the match will progress to the next tie-breaker, extra time.

Example 2:

- In the first leg, the final score is: Team A (Home) 0–0 Team B (Away).
- In the second leg, the final score is: Team B (Home) 2–2 Team A (Away).

In this example, the aggregate score is 2–2. However, because Team A scored an away goal in the second leg while Team B, in the first leg, did not, Team A will progress to the next stage of the competition as they scored more away goals than Team B.

Example 3:

In the first leg, the final score is:

- First leg: Team A (Home) 1–0 Team B (Away).

In the second leg, the final score goes as follows:

- Second leg, after 90 minutes: Team B (Home) 1–0 Team A (Away).
- Second leg, after extra time: Team B (Home) 2–1 Team A (Away).

In this example, the aggregate score is 1–1 after 90 minutes in the second leg and neither team has scored an away goal, the match goes into extra time. The score remains level 2–2 on aggregate after extra time. However, Team A has now scored an away goal and competition rules count away goals after extra time, Team A will thus progress to the next stage of the competition, as they scored more away goals than Team B.

Example 4:

In the first leg, the final score is:

- First leg: Team A (Home) 1–0 Team B (Away).

In the second leg, the final score goes as follows:

- Second leg, after 90 minutes: Team B (Home) 1–0 Team A (Away).
- Second leg, after extra time: Team B (Home) 2–1 Team A (Away).

In this example, the aggregate score is 1–1 after 90 minutes in the second leg and neither team has scored an away goal, the match goes into extra time. After extra time, the scores remain level 2–2 on aggregate, and Team A has now scored an away goal. However, unlike in example 3, the competition rules don't count the away goals in extra time, and the match will progress to a penalty shootout.

Example 5:

In the first leg, the final score is:

- First leg: Team A (Home) 1–0 Team B (Away).

In the second leg, the final score goes as follows:

- Second leg, after 90 minutes: Team B (Home) 1–0 Team A (Away).
- Second leg, after extra time: Team B (Home) 1–0 Team A (Away).

In this example, the aggregate score is 1–1, but as neither team scored an away goal, the match will progress to the next tie-breaker, extra time. Since no further goals are scored there, the match will progress to a penalty shootout.

Example 6:

- First leg: Team A (Home) 0–1 Team B (Away).
- Second leg: Team B (Home) 1–2 Team A (Away).

In this example, the aggregate score is 2–2. However, because Team A has scored more away goals than Team B, Team A will progress to the next stage of the competition.

== Rationale ==
Originally, the away goal rule was introduced in football as an expedited way of doing away with playoffs or tie breakers on neutral grounds to resolve a logistical, physical and calendar problem when two teams were so closely matched the final score over the two legs remained in absolute parity, which could remain even after a third game tie breaker. The away goals rule is intended to encourage the away team to be more aggressive. In football, at least, it can lead to a nervous first leg: the home team is unwilling to commit large numbers of players to attack to avoid conceding an away goal, whilst the away team attempts to snatch an away goal to aid them in the second leg. Such tactics arguably make the second leg more exciting, after a low-scoring first leg leaves both sides with a chance to win. There are sometimes debates over whether the away goals rule gives an unfair advantage to the team playing away first — with the other team squandering their home advantage in the first leg due to away goal fears — and this may be a factor in its somewhat patchy adoption for competitions.

The rule can also make the game more exciting as normally one goal can only make the difference between losing and drawing, or between drawing and winning, but with the away goals rule, one goal can make the difference between losing and winning.

There is also the issue that if extra time is played in the second leg, the away team gets an extra 30 minutes to take advantage of the away goals rule. This can be countered by the fact that in extra time, the home team has the advantage of playing the extra 30 minutes at home. In addition, usually, the home team had made a better campaign in the group stage, which would naturally give it some advantage over the away team.

Anecdotal evidence suggests that most teams feel an away goal puts them in the driving seat, such as Liverpool being able to draw 1–1 at Arsenal in the 2007–08 UEFA Champions League quarterfinals; Liverpool did eliminate Arsenal to advance to the semi-finals. Liverpool won the second game 4–2, making the aggregate score for the tie Liverpool 5–3 Arsenal, therefore, the away goal scored by Liverpool in the first leg was not required. Many commentators have described the importance of a team being able to score an away goal, even when losing that leg of the tie, as it mathematically does give that team a chance to redeem itself on home soil by leveling the tie on aggregate while using the away goal as a tiebreaker. For example, in the 2007 UEFA Champions League round of 16, while Bayern Munich lost the first leg 2–3 at Real Madrid, Bayern later won 2–1 at home to level the tie on aggregate, but it was Bayern's away goals scored during their first leg loss that let them advance. In the 2009–10 UEFA Champions League, Bayern Munich won both round of 16 and quarter-finals on the away goal rule after drawing 4–4 on aggregate, by winning 2–1 at home and losing 2–3 away, against Fiorentina and Manchester United respectively.

In the 2012–13 UEFA Champions League semi-finals, despite losing 1–4 in the first leg to Borussia Dortmund, Real Madrid would have been able to advance if at home it managed to hold Dortmund to 3–0; during the second leg Real Madrid scored two goals in the last ten minutes but were unable to score the third goal that would have sent them through to the final (Dortmund advanced 4–3 on aggregate). In the other semi-final, however, after Barcelona were defeated away by Bayern Munich 4–0, commentators considered Barcelona essentially eliminated because Bayern could seal the tie by scoring one away goal even if Barcelona managed to score five goals (Bayern managed a 3–0 win in the second leg to advance 7–0 on aggregate).

The away goals rule can result in the "lead" of the two-legged tie swinging back and forth. For instance, in the 2004–05 UEFA Champions League round of 16 between Barcelona and Chelsea, Barcelona were ahead on aggregate after a 2–1 win in the first leg at home. During the second leg held in London, Chelsea first scored three straight goals to take the lead on aggregate (4–2), but Barcelona responded with two goals to level the aggregate score at 4–4 while taking the lead on away goals (2–1). Chelsea scored again, though, to advance on aggregate, 5–4.

In the 2018–19 UEFA Champions League semi-finals between Tottenham Hotspur and Manchester City, Spurs led 1-0 in the first leg. Although Manchester City win the second leg by 4-3, Spur still advanced by winning 3-0 away goal(s).

In the 2018–19 UEFA Champions League semi-finals between Tottenham Hotspur and Ajax, Ajax led the tie from the 15th minute of the first leg (in a 1–0 away victory in London) until the 95th minute of the second leg (at that point still up 3–2 on aggregate), when Tottenham's Lucas Moura completed a hat-trick in Amsterdam that leveled the aggregate score at 3–3 while eliminating Ajax, 3–1, on away goals.

== Usage ==
The away goals rule was applied in many football competitions that involved two-leg fixtures, including the knockout stages of the CAF Champions League, CAF Confederation Cup, and any two-legged playoffs in qualification for the FIFA World Cup or European Championships.

From 2014 until 2018, Major League Soccer in the U.S. and Canada used the away goals rule in the MLS Cup Playoffs, in which the conference semi-finals and finals (the quarterfinals and semi-finals of the overall tournament) were two-legged. The rule was first applied in this competition when Seattle Sounders FC defeated FC Dallas in the 2014 Western Conference semi-finals. In the 2019 MLS season, two-legged ties were eliminated in favour of a single-elimination knockout format throughout the entire playoffs.

In the Liga MX, the away goals rule always applied to the playoff games until the 2020–21 season. This was also applied to the final games until the 1995–96 season where Necaxa beat Celaya F.C. In those games, Necaxa was able to pull a 1–1 tie in the game in Celaya, then the team was able to hold a 0–0 tie in Azteca Stadium to win the championship. After that final, the away goals rule was removed from the final game and in case of a tie after the two games, it went to extra time and a penalty shootout if needed, as happened in the Invierno 1999 season where Atlas F.C. and Toluca FC were tied 5–5 (3-3 and 2-2) at the end of the second game (that would give Toluca the championship by away goals) but it went to extra time and a penalty shootout where Toluca beat Atlas 5–3 to win the championship.

In CONMEBOL competitions before 2005, for example the Copa Libertadores, neither away goals rule nor extra time were used. Ties that were level on aggregate went to an immediate penalty shootout. From 2005 until 2021, two-legged ties were decided on points, followed by goal difference and the away goals rule; if the result was still tied, the penalty shootout was used. The finals became the only exception to the away goals and extra time. In Latin America, an example of a tournament that used the away goal rule was the Copa do Brasil (Brazil Cup) until the 2017 edition.

The Football League Cup semi-finals, when previously played over two legs, would apply the away goals rule only after extra time. Similarly, the rule used to be applied in the Football League Play Offs - which are two-legged affairs in the semifinals - as a tiebreaker when the aggregate score was level following extra time. One example of this was in the 1999 First Division Play Off Semi Final.Ipswich Town lost their first leg 0–1 to Bolton Wanderers at home, before winning the second leg 4–3 away after extra time to level the aggregate score at 4–4, but Bolton progressed to the final courtesy of their away goal in the first leg. The Play Offs now uses penalty shootouts to determine a winner if the aggregate score is tied after the extra time period.

The away goals rule is sometimes used in round-robin competitions (that is, leagues or qualifying groups), where it may be used to break ties involving more than two teams. For example, head-to-head away goals are the third tiebreaker in the group stage of both the UEFA Champions League and UEFA Cup. However, this regulation has since been removed as UEFA abolished the use of the away goals rule in knockout matches. In Group C of the UEFA Champions League 2000–01, Olympique Lyonnais took the second qualifying spot ahead of Olympiacos on head-to-head away goals. Because other tiebreakers take precedence, the away goals rule is rarely invoked in such tournaments; for example World Cup qualification, which did not use this rule in 2006.

Ties level on aggregate used to go to a playoff on neutral ground until the away goals rule was first applied in the UEFA Cup Winners' Cup when Budapest Honvéd beat Dukla Prague in the second round in 1965–66. It was introduced in the Fairs Cup in 1966–67, and in the European Cup in 1967–68 for the first round, 1968–69 for the second round, and 1970–71 for later rounds.

On 24 June 2021, UEFA approved the proposal to abolish the away goals rule in all club competitions from the 2021–22 season. After that, AFC followed the suit starting from the 2023–24 season.

== Anomalies ==
If the two clubs contesting a two-legged fixture share the same stadium, each club may be the home club in one leg, and the rule may still apply. For example, the 2003 UEFA Champions League semi-finals drew Inter Milan and AC Milan together. Both legs were played at the San Siro, their shared stadium in Milan:

- First leg: AC Milan 0–0 Inter Milan
- Second leg: Inter Milan 1–1 AC Milan

With an aggregate of 1–1, AC Milan was declared the winner because they were the "away" side in the second game. In this example, as in many such cases, most tickets for each leg will be reserved for the "home" side's fans, so the designation was not totally arbitrary.

Not all competitions with the away goals rule suffer from this anomaly, however: the Copa do Brasil has developed its rules to avoid some anomalies, such as the above. In that Cup, if two teams share either the same stadium or the same home town, neither is considered the home club and thus the away goals rule does not apply. This exception was seen, for example, in the 2006 final between Flamengo and Vasco, when both legs were played at the Maracanã Stadium.

More anomalous was a qualification play-off for the 1991 World Youth Championship between Australia and Israel: Australia won on away goals even though, due to security concerns arising from the First Intifada, Israel's "home" leg was played in Australia. The same situation occurred in the 2010 FIFA World Cup qualification tie between the Bahamas and the British Virgin Islands, when the Bahamas advanced on the away goals rule even though both legs were played in the Bahamas.

There has been at least one case of a wrong application of the away goals rule by a referee in an international club tournament. It happened in a second-round tie in the 1971–72 European Cup Winners' Cup between Rangers and Sporting Clube de Portugal. This fixture had the following scorelines:

- First leg: Rangers 3–2 Sporting
- Second leg, after 90 minutes: Sporting 3–2 Rangers
- Second leg, after extra time: Sporting 4–3 Rangers

Since the teams were now level 6–6 on aggregate, the Dutch referee Laurens van Raavens ordered a penalty shootout, which Sporting won 3–0. Rangers appealed the loss, however, because Van Raavens should not have ordered the shootout, since the Rangers goal in extra time in Lisbon gave them a lead of three away goals to two. Rangers won the appeal and went on to win the Cup Winners' Cup that season.

CONCACAF used a different rule for its CONCACAF Champions League, employing away goals at the end of regulation of the second leg but not applying the rule at the end of extra time. It has since abolished extra time in that tournament with penalty kicks used if teams are even on goals and away goals after both legs. MLS adopted this version of the rule for its playoffs in 2014. For example, the semifinal of the 2008–09 CONCACAF Champions League between Cruz Azul and the Puerto Rico Islanders had the following scorelines:

- First leg: Puerto Rico Islanders 2–0 Cruz Azul
- Second leg, after 90 minutes: Cruz Azul 2–0 Puerto Rico Islanders
- Second leg, after extra time: Cruz Azul 3–1 Puerto Rico Islanders

Since CONCACAF does not apply the away goals rule for goals scored in extra time, the game went to a penalty shootout, which Cruz Azul won 4–2.

A similar situation occurred in the 2018 MLS Cup Playoffs, in the second leg of Seattle Sounders FC vs Portland Timbers. After both legs went 2–1, for a 3–3 aggregate (with equal away goals) after regulation time, the game went to extra time. In extra time, both teams scored. At the end of extra time, the away team, Timbers, began to celebrate, assuming their away goal in extra time would break the tie; but the tournament did not apply the away goals rule to extra time goals, leading to a penalty shootout (which Timbers won 4–2).

The away goals rule can also apply to forfeited matches. Celtic lost their away tie to Legia Warsaw 4–1 in the 2014–15 UEFA Champions League third qualifying round. In their home leg, Legia brought on an ineligible player which automatically gave Celtic a 3–0 win. The forfeiture meant that the tie ended 4–4, meaning Celtic qualified to the next round, 1–0, on away goals.

The away goals rule can also apply to matches played behind closed doors. For the 2019–20 and 2020–21 editions of the UEFA Champions League, although the away goals rule remained in place for these seasons, home advantage was nullified as a result of the COVID-19 pandemic having no home fans for support (empty stadiums) and even being forced to relocate their "home" to alternate venues, leading to UEFA deciding to abolish the away goals rule. Both legs of the 2020–21 UEFA Champions League round of 16 contest between Porto and Juventus were played without fans in attendance due to the COVID-19 pandemic. Porto won the first leg 2–1 at home and trailed the second leg by the same score after regulation. Both teams scored a goal in extra time and Porto went through, 2–1, on away goals. In the same 2020–21 season, the quarter-final between Bayern Munich and Paris Saint-Germain ended in a 3–3 draw on aggregate, but Paris Saint-Germain scored more away goals than Bayern Munich, 3–1, to qualify for the semi-finals.

== Summary ==
Below is a summary of the variations of rules and examples of current competitions using the away goals rule for two legged-ties. In most examples in the table below, a penalty shoot-out is used to determine the winner if all criteria used remain tied.

Application of away goals rule when aggregate score is level after regulation (90 mins) of second leg
Is the away goals rule applied after regulation time?	Extra time played?	Is the away goals rule applied after extra time?	Current examples
Yes	Yes	Yes	None
Yes	Yes	No	CONCACAF Nations League and CONCACAF Champions Cup
Yes	No	—N/a	CAF Champions League and CAF Confederation Cup
No	Yes	Yes	None
