= Nigel Henry =

Trinidadian footballer

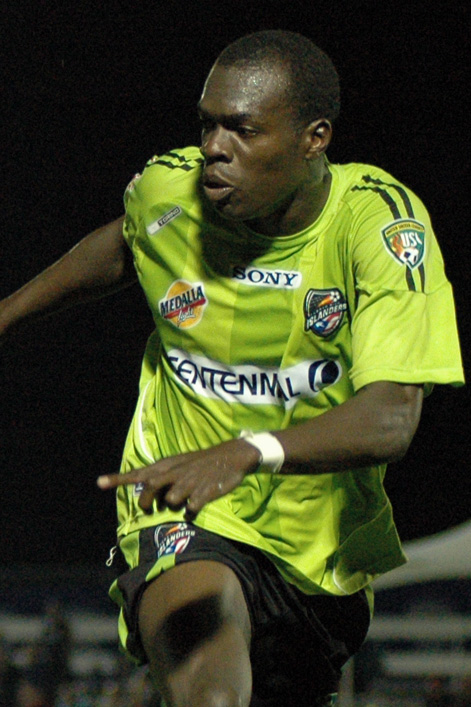

Personal information
- Full name: Neil Nigel Henry
- Date of birth: May 24, 1976 (age 50)
- Place of birth: Carenage, Trinidad and Tobago
- Height: 6 ft 4 in (1.93 m)
- Position: Defender

College career
Years	Team	Apps	(Gls)
- Howard Bison

Senior career*
Years	Team	Apps	(Gls)
2001	Hershey Wildcats	21	(0)
2002	Montreal Impact	7	(0)
2003–2004	Charleston Battery	15	(0)
2005	Toronto Lynx	7	(0)
2006	Kiruna		
2007	Superstar Rangers		
2008–2010	Puerto Rico Islanders	50	(0)

International career^{‡}
2005	Trinidad and Tobago	2	(0)
- * Club domestic league appearances and goals as of September 25, 2009 ‡ National team caps and goals as of July 23, 2008

Nigel Henry (born May 24, 1976 in Carenage) is a retired Trinidadian soccer player.

== Career ==
=== Club ===
In 2001 Henry was signed by the Hershey Wildcats of the USL First Division where he and his teammates reached the USL First Division Championship game. In 2002 Henry was transferred to the Montreal Impact where he played seven games. In the following season, 2003, Henry signed for the Charleston Battery where he was a solid defender, helping the team capture the USL First Division Championship.

In May 2005, Henry signed with the Toronto Lynx where he was a key contributor in the defence for a struggling team plagued with injuries throughout the season.

To improve his chances of selection for the 2006 FIFA World Cup, Henry signed that year for Kiruna FF of the Swedish Division 1, but was unsuccessful in his bid, and never played a game for the team. After another brief stint back home with the Superstar Rangers, the Puerto Rico Islanders announced the signing of Henry and Kevon Villaroel for the 2008 season. He retired at the end of the 2009 season, but in the second half of the 2010 season came back to the Islanders, from which he later retired again.

=== International ===
In 2005 Henry earned two international caps or selection for the Trinidad and Tobago, having been named in squads against Barbados and Guatemala.

== Honors ==
=== Puerto Rico Islanders ===
- USSF Division 2 Pro League Champions (1): 2010
- Commissioner's Cup Winners (1): 2008
