= Víctor Hugo Barros =

Brazilian footballer and manager

Personal information
- Date of birth: 25 May 1961 (age 65)
- Place of birth: Porto Alegre–RS, Brazil

Senior career*
Years	Team	Apps	(Gls)
1970–1975	Internacional		
1971	→ Esportivo (loan)		
1975	Coritiba		
1976	Juventude		
1976–1980	Grêmio		
1981–1982	Palmeiras		
1983	Caxias		
1984	Aimoré		
1985	Esportivo		
1985–1986	Botafogo-PB		

Managerial career
- 2004: Puerto Rico
- 2013–2014: Puerto Rico
- * Club domestic league appearances and goals

Víctor Hugo Barros (born 25 May 1961 in Porto Alegre died 19 August 2025) was a Brazilian former football player and football manager.

== Career ==
In 2004 and since 2014 he coached the Puerto Rico national football team.
