= Carlos García Cantarero =

Spanish football manager

Personal information
- Full name: Carlos García Cantarero
- Date of birth: 4 November 1961 (age 64)
- Place of birth: Madrid, Spain

Managerial career
- Years: Team
- 1995–1999: SS Reyes
- 1999–2000: Amorós
- 2000: Lugo
- 2000–2001: Atlético Madrid B
- 2001: Atlético Madrid
- 2001–2002: Atlético Madrid B
- 2002–2003: Levante
- 2003: Elche
- 2004–2005: Cultural Leonesa
- 2006–2007: Chorrillo
- 2008: Torrellano
- 2009: Alianza
- 2009: Antequera
- 2010: Juventud Retalteca
- 2011–2012: Victoria
- 2012–2013: Plaza Amador
- 2014–2015: Chorrillo
- 2016–2018: Puerto Rico

Carlos García Cantarero (born 4 November 1961) is a Spanish football manager.

García Cantarero managed Atlético Madrid, Levante and Elche in Segunda División, as well as four teams in Segunda División B. Later, he coached extensively in Central America, including two years as national manager of Puerto Rico.

== Career ==
Born in Madrid, García Cantarero began his career with UD San Sebastián de los Reyes, where he helped the side achieve promotion to Segunda División B in 1998. He later managed CP Amorós and fellow league teams CD Lugo and Atlético Madrid B. On 30 April 2001, he succeeded the sacked Marcos Alonso as manager of the latter's first team, who were seven points off the promotion places having been relegated to the Segunda División. He had previously worked as an author and journalist.

García Cantarero was the responsible of giving Fernando Torres his professional debut on 27 May 2001, in a 1–0 home win over neighbours CD Leganés. He won six and drew one of his seven league fixtures, and also oversaw a 2–1 aggregate loss to Real Zaragoza in the Copa del Rey semi-finals.

After the appointment of Luis Aragonés at the Vicente Calderón Stadium, García Cantarero returned to the B-team. He bounced back to the second division on 2 February 2002, taking the helm of Levante UD for the rest of the season. The campaign ended with relegation, but the Valencian team's place was retained due to the administrative relegation of Burgos CF; he was dismissed on 19 May 2003 after hopes of promotion were extinguished. He

García Cantarero began the 2003–04 season in the same league with Elche CF, and was ousted by the board on 15 December. For 2004–05, he returned to the third tier with Cultural y Deportiva Leonesa, but was dismissed in February 2005 with the team 11 points off the play-offs, and agreed with the cash-strapped club that his payout be in instalments into the next year.

In 2006, García Cantarero accepted his first foreign job with Chorrillo F.C. in Panama. He returned home in July 2008, in an attempt to get Torrellano CF into the Tercera División.

García Cantarero returned to Central America in March 2009 with Alianza F.C. from El Salvador, and was sacked in May after the team was confined to a relegation play-off. He was appointed at Antequera CF, newly relegated to Spain's fourth tier, in June 2009, but was dismissed before the end of the calendar year for not meeting the aims of challenging for promotion.

In February 2010, García Cantarero crossed the Atlantic again to lead Juventud Retalteca, last-placed in Guatemala's top flight, and the following year took the reins at CD Victoria in Honduras. Following a return to Panama with C.D. Plaza Amador and Chorrillo again, he was appointed as national manager of Puerto Rico in June 2016. After two years in the hotseat, he was replaced by former Honduran international Amado Guevara.
