= Leandro Antonetti =

Puerto Rican footballer (born 2003)

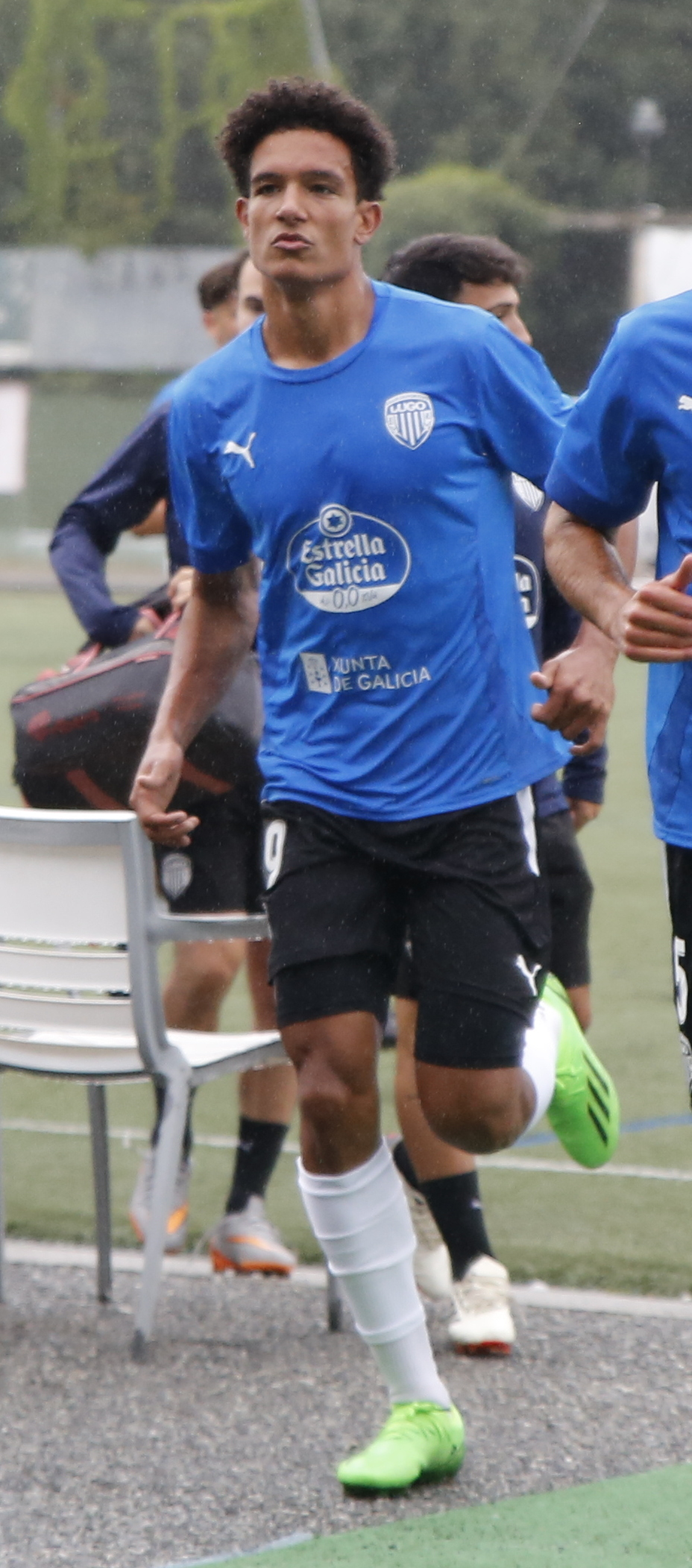
- Antonetti with Lugo in 2024

Personal information
- Full name: Leandro Antonetti López
- Date of birth: 13 January 2003 (age 23)
- Place of birth: Murcia, Spain
- Height: 1.89 m (6 ft 2 in)
- Position: Forward

Team information
- Current team: Estrela da Amadora
- Number: 37

Youth career
- Caguas Bairoa
- Conquistadores de Guaynabo
- 2013–2019: Xuventude Oroso
- 2019–2021: Lugo

Senior career*
| Years | Team | Apps | (Gls) |
| 2021–2023 | Polvorín | 41 | (13) |
| 2023–2024 | Lugo | 39 | (6) |
| 2024–2025 | Sevilla B | 30 | (5) |
| 2025 | Sevilla | 2 | (0) |
| 2025– | Estrela da Amadora | 34 | (5) |

International career^{‡}
| 2019 | Puerto Rico U17 | 4 | (1) |
| 2021 | Puerto Rico U20 | 2 | (0) |
| 2022– | Puerto Rico | 23 | (7) |
Medal record
Representing Puerto Rico
Men's football
FIFA Series
| Winner | 2026 Puerto Rico |
- * Club domestic league appearances and goals as of 22 November 2026 ‡ National team caps and goals as of 4 October 2026

Leandro Antonetti López (born 13 January 2003) is a professional footballer who plays for Primeira Liga club Estrela da Amadora. Mainly a forward, he can also play as a winger. Born in Spain, he plays for the Puerto Rico national team.

== Club career ==
=== Youth career ===
Born in Murcia when his father was playing in Spain, Antonetti began playing football in the Puerto Rican club Caguas Bairoa before moving to Conquistadores de Guaynabo. His impressions at the 2013 MIC Tournament led him to a move to Spanish club ED Xuventude Oroso. In 2019, he was signed by CD Lugo for their academy.

=== Lugo ===
In November 2021, Antonetti was called up by Lugo's first team for a Copa del Rey match against AD Unión Adarve, but he was only an unused substitute. On 20 May 2022, after scoring eleven goals for the reserves and helping in their first-ever promotion to the Segunda Federación, he made his professional debut with Lugo's first team in the Segunda División, coming on as an 80th-minute substitute for Diego Alende in a 0–1 away loss against Real Zaragoza.

=== Sevilla ===
On 30 August 2024, Antonetti signed a three-year deal with Sevilla FC, being initially assigned to the B-team in Primera Federación. Immediately making his debut with the team as a starter two days later against Algeciras CF on September 1. Antonetti made his La Liga debut on January 25, 2025 in a 1-1 draw against RCD Espanyol entering as a substitute.

=== Estrela da Amadora ===
On 1 September 2025, Antonetti moved to Portugal, signing a three-year contract with Primeira Liga club Estrela da Amadora.

== International career ==
Antonetti made his international debut with Puerto Rico U17 in the 2019 Concacaf Championship under coach Marco Vélez, where he managed to score a goal against Martinique in the first round. In 2021, he was called up for the under-20 team under coach Dave Sarachan for 2021 CONCACAF U-20 Championship qualifying, where he helped Puerto Rico advance to the final round.

Antonetti made his debut with the full side on 9 June 2022, in a CONCACAF Nations League match against the Cayman Islands. His first full international goal occurred on 23 March of the following year, as he scored the equalizer in a 3–1 win over the British Virgin Islands.

== Personal life ==
His father Ossie Antonetti is a former professional volleyball player, and is the current head coach of the Puerto Rico men's national volleyball team.

== Career statistics ==
List of international goals scored by Leandro Antonetti
| No. | Date | Venue | Opponent | Score | Result | Competition |
|---|---|---|---|---|---|---|
| 1. | 23 March 2023 | A. O. Shirley Recreation Ground, Road Town, British Virgin Islands | British Virgin Islands | 1–1 | 3–1 | 2022–23 CONCACAF Nations League C |
| 2. | 14 October 2023 | SKNFA Technical Center, Basseterre, Saint Kitts and Nevis | Guyana | 1–0 | 1–3 | 2023–24 CONCACAF Nations League B |
| 3. | 11 June 2024 | Juan Ramon Loubriel Stadium, Bayamón, Puerto Rico | Anguilla | 5–0 | 8–0 | 2026 FIFA World Cup qualification |
| 4. | 10 June 2025 | Mayagüez Athletics Stadium, Mayagüez, Puerto Rico | Saint Vincent and the Grenadines | 1–0 | 2–1 | 2026 FIFA World Cup qualification |
| 5. | 9 September 2024 | Mayagüez Athletics Stadium, Mayagüez, Puerto Rico | Aruba | 1–0 | 1–0 | 2024–25 CONCACAF Nations League B |
| 6. | 25 March 2026 | Juan Ramon Loubriel Stadium, Bayamón, Puerto Rico | Guam | 4–0 | 4–0 | 2026 FIFA Series |

== Honours ==
Puerto Rico

- FIFA Series: 2026
