= Arnie Ramirez =

US association football manager

Personal information
- Full name: Arnold Ramirez
- Place of birth: Costa Rica

Managerial career
- Years: Team
- 1979–1998: Long Island University
- 1992: Puerto Rico
- 1999–2011: Ramapo College (women)

Arnie Ramirez (born in Costa Rica) is an American soccer manager who last worked as head coach of Ramapo College.

== Career ==
Ramirez started his managerial career with Long Island University. In 1992, he was appointed head coach of the Puerto Rico national football team, a position he held until 1992. After that, he coached Ramapo College women.
