= Charlie Trout =

English football manager (born 1985)

Personal information
- Full name: Charles Trout
- Date of birth: 20 April 1985 (age 41)
- Place of birth: Nottingham, England

College career
Years	Team	Apps	(Gls)
2007–2009	UIC Flames		

Senior career*
Years	Team	Apps	(Gls)
	Lincoln City	0	(0)
- Gainsborough Trinity

Managerial career
- 2023–2026: Puerto Rico
- 2026–: Puerto Rico U16
- * Club domestic league appearances and goals

Charles Trout (born 20 April 1985) is an English football manager and former player who managed the Puerto Rico national team.

Released from Lincoln City without a first-team appearance, he played in the Conference North for Gainsborough Trinity, where he suffered from injury. He moved to the United States to play college soccer for the UIC Flames.

Trout stayed in Chicago to coach youths, and in 2021 was hired by Dave Sarachan to oversee the Puerto Rico under-20 team. When Sarachan resigned in March 2023, Trout succeeded him as manager of the senior team.

== Early life and playing career ==
Trout was born in Nottingham and raised in a council estate in Clifton, and became a fan of Nottingham Forest. When he was 11 and representing the Nottinghamshire County Football Association's boys' team, he was scouted for Leeds United, but did not advance through the youth system.

Trout then signed for Lincoln City on an apprenticeship. He was given a first-team squad number and trained with the professionals, but was released at age 19 without playing a game. He then signed for Gainsborough Trinity of the sixth-tier Conference North while working in other jobs during the week. He was sidelined for eight months with a hamstring injury picked up against Kettering Town in the FA Trophy, and recurring injuries afterwards meant that he gave up on finding a way back into professional football in England.

Having previously rejected the chance to play in the United States, Trout had a trial for the UIC Flames of the University of Illinois Chicago. He initially wanted to stay in England after returning during the severe winters of The Windy City, but remained and completed his degree.

== Coaching career ==
Trout had helped coach the youth teams at Lincoln, and became involved with inner-city youth teams in Chicago, with several of his players joining the academy of Chicago Fire SC. During the COVID-19 pandemic, he turned down jobs at other clubs and began his own coaching business.

In 2021, American Dave Sarachan became manager of the Puerto Rico national football team and enlisted Trout as an assistant for the under-20 team. Sarachan resigned with promotion from League C of the CONCACAF Nations League already secured, and Trout was named in charge on 19 March 2023, four days ahead of the next fixture away to the British Virgin Islands. The side won his debut 3–1 in Road Town.

Trout led Puerto Rico in 2023 CONCACAF Gold Cup qualification in Florida, defeating Suriname on penalties in the first round before falling 2–0 to Martinique in the final. In the 2023–24 CONCACAF Nations League B, his team came second of four, behind Guyana, while the following season saw the same result behind a Haiti team with a 100% record; Puerto Rico did not finish as one of the best runners-up to advance to the next CONCACAF Gold Cup qualification. In qualification for the 2026 FIFA World Cup, Puerto Rico advanced to the second round and remained in contention to go further, but a draw between Suriname and El Salvador on the final day meant those two teams advanced.

As manager of Puerto Rico, Trout has fielded young players including those still in college soccer in the United States, as it is common for players in their mid-20s to leave football for a more stable or well-paying profession. He commented that some of his opponents such as Suriname could call upon professionals from the Dutch Eredivisie or Spain's La Liga.
