= John Krause =

American soccer player

Personal information
- Full name: John Krause
- Date of birth: November 11, 1983 (age 43)
- Place of birth: Framingham, Massachusetts, United States
- Height: 6 ft 2 in (1.88 m)
- Position: Defender

College career
Years	Team	Apps	(Gls)
2002–2003	Boston College Eagles		
2004–2005	Vanderbilt Commodores		

Senior career*
Years	Team	Apps	(Gls)
2003	Worcester Kings	9	(1)
2004–2005	Cape Cod Crusaders	32	(8)
2006	Wilmington Hammerheads	6	(1)
2006	Cincinnati Kings	8	(4)
2007–2009	Puerto Rico Islanders	73	(8)
2007–2008	New Jersey Ironmen (indoor)	16	(6)
2008	Massachusetts Twisters (indoor)	3	(4)
2009–2010	Monterrey La Raza (indoor)	7	(5)
2010	Hòa Phát Hà Nội		(2)
2010	Beijing Baxy&Shengshi	9	(0)
2010–2013	San Diego Sockers (indoor)	19	(9)
2011–2012	Carolina RailHawks	31	(1)

International career^{‡}
2010–2012	Puerto Rico	16	(1)
- * Club domestic league appearances and goals as of September 28, 2012 ‡ National team caps and goals as of June 17, 2012

John Krause (born November 11, 1983, in Framingham, Massachusetts) is a Puerto Rican international footballer who most recently played for the Carolina RailHawks in the North American Soccer League.

== Career ==
=== College and amateur ===
Krause was born in Framingham, Massachusetts, the youngest son of M. Jan and Harold Krause's five sons. He was raised in Holliston, Massachusetts and attended The Rivers School, before playing college soccer for both Boston College and Vanderbilt University, and for Worcester Kings in the USL Premier Development League.

=== Professional ===
Undrafted out of college, Krause turned professional in 2006, playing with the Cincinnati Kings in the USL Second Division, finishing as the team's top scorer.

Krause joined the Puerto Rico Islanders in the USL First Division in 2007. He helped the Islanders win the 2008 USL First Division regular season title and progressed to the semi-finals of the CONCACAF Champions League 2008–09.

In 2008 Krause also spent a short period playing indoor soccer with the Massachusetts Twisters in the National Indoor Soccer League. He also spent time with Monterrey La Raza.

He joined the Hanoi team Hòa Phát Hà Nội for the 2010 season, starting January 31, 2010.

Krause transferred to Beijing Baxy&Shengshi on July 16, 2010.

He signed with Carolina RailHawks of the North American Soccer League on March 7, 2011.

=== International ===
Krause was called up to the Puerto Rico national team in September 2010. As a United States citizen he was eligible to the team after residing in the Commonwealth for two years while playing with the Puerto Rico Islanders. He got his first cap in a 2010 Caribbean Championship qualification stage match against Anguilla on October 2, 2010 and scored his first goal in the same competition against Saint-Martin two days later.

== Honors ==
=== Club ===
==== Puerto Rico Islanders ====
- USL First Division Championship runners-up: 2008
- Commissioner's Cup: 2008
- CFU Club Championship runner-up: 2009
