= Cristian Arrieta =

Footballer and coach (born 1979)

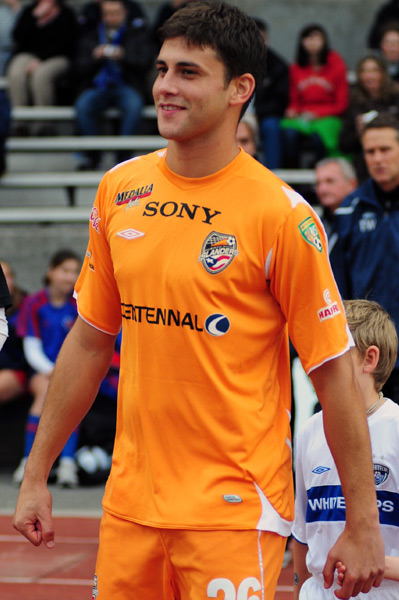
- Arrieta with the Puerto Rico Islanders in 2009

Personal information
- Full name: Cristian Arrieta
- Date of birth: September 18, 1979 (age 47)
- Place of birth: Orlando, Florida, United States
- Height: 6 ft 2 in (1.88 m)
- Position: Defender

Senior career*
Years	Team	Apps	(Gls)
1997–1998	Gravellona	23	(1)
1998–2002	Mestre	79	(5)
2002–2003	Genoa	0	(0)
2003	Alessandria	9	(2)
2003–2004	Ivrea	25	(1)
2004–2005	Cervia	33	(3)
2005–2006	Lecco	26	(1)
2006–2007	Lecce	7	(0)
2008–2009	Puerto Rico Islanders	54	(17)
2010	Philadelphia Union	16	(0)
2011	Fort Lauderdale Strikers	14	(1)
2012–2014	Juventus Domo	?	(?)
2014–2015	Briga	?	(?)
2015–2016	F.A. Euro	5	(1)

International career
2010–2018	Puerto Rico	22	(5)

Managerial career
- 2014–2015: LIAC New York (U19)
- 2015: F.A. Euro (U14)
- 2016: Athletic Union (assistant)
- * Club domestic league appearances and goals

Cristian Arrieta (born September 18, 1979) is a retired professional footballer who played as a defender and later coached youth teams. He represented the Puerto Rico national team, making 22 appearances and scoring five goals between 2010 and 2018.

Born in Orlando, Florida, Arrieta grew up in Spain and Italy. He began his professional career in Italy, playing for clubs in the lower divisions. In 2008, he returned to North America and signed for the Puerto Rico Islanders. Where he played under head coach Colin Clarke. In 2008, the Islanders finished first in the regular season and reached the league final. Arrieta was named the USL First Division Defender of the Year and was selected in the All-League First Team.

In February 2010, he ranked 14th in the USL First Division, Top 25 of the Decade' list. Later that year, he earned his first cap for the Puerto Rico national team.

== Club career ==
=== Europe ===
Born to a Basque-Spanish father and a Portuguese mother from Salento, Arrieta grew up in Bilbao, Spain, and Borgomanero, Italy. He spent much of his early career playing in the Italian lower divisions, with over 120 appearances for clubs such as Varese, Mestre, Ivrea, and Alessandria in the Serie C2. He also participated in the Italian reality show Campioni, il sogno, focused on the football club Cervia.

In 2005, he signed with Lecco in Serie C1, and in 2006 joined Lecce in Serie B, where he made seven appearances.

=== North America ===
In 2008, Arrieta signed with the Puerto Rico Islanders of the USL First Division. That season, the club won the Commissioner's Cup after finishing first in the regular season. Arrieta scored seven goals and two assists and was named the USL First Division Defender of the Year and an All-League First Team selection. The Islanders reached the league final, losing 2–1 to the Vancouver Whitecaps, and advanced to the knockout stages of the CONCACAF Champions League.

During the 2009 season, Arrieta scored 10 goals and made five assists, finishing fourth in the league's scoring rankings. The Islanders returned to the playoffs after finishing third. For the second consecutive year, Arrieta became an All-League selection. On October 15, 2009, Arrieta was named Defender of the Year for the second consecutive season. He also received the Most Valuable Player award, becoming the second defender to do so after Marcelo Balboa in 1988.

Arrieta signed with Major League Soccer club Philadelphia Union on April 5, 2010. Philadelphia waived him on February 8, 2011. He signed with Fort Lauderdale Strikers of the North American Soccer League on March 31, 2011. Arrieta was released by the club at the end of the season.

== International career ==
Arrieta played for the Puerto Rico national team in September 2010. As a United States citizen, Arrieta was eligible to represent Puerto Rico, which fields its own national team in international competitions. He met residency requirements while playing for the Puerto Rico Islanders. He earned his first cap in a 2010 Caribbean Cup qualification stage match against Anguilla on October 2, 2010, and scored his first goal in the same competition against Saint Martin on 4 October 2010.

== Coaching career ==
From 2013 to 2015, Arrieta worked in youth coaching roles in New York with Massapequa Soccer Club, LIAC New York, and Oceanside United. In April 2015, he joined the coaching staff of the Italian Soccer Training Exchange Program (ISTEP).

=== International goals ===
Scores and results list Puerto Rico's goal tally first.

#	Date	Venue	Opponent	Score	Result	Competition
1.	October 4, 2010	Estadio Juan Ramón Loubriel, Bayamón, Puerto Rico	Saint Martin	2–0	2–0	2010 Caribbean Cup qualification
2.	November 12, 2011	Beausejour Stadium, Gros Islet, Saint Lucia	Saint Lucia	1-0	4-0	2014 FIFA World Cup qualification
3.	February 26, 2012	Managua, Nicaragua	Nicaragua	1-0	1-4	Friendly
4.	June 2, 2012	Estadio Juan Ramón Loubriel, Bayamón, Puerto Rico	Nicaragua	1-0	3-1	Friendly
5.	September 9, 2012	Stade Sylvio Cator, Port-au-Prince, Haiti	Saint Martin	4-0	9-0	2012 Caribbean Cup qualification

== Honors ==
=== Club ===
Puerto Rico Islanders

- USL First Division Championship runner-up: 2008
- Commissioner's Cup: 2008
- CFU Club Championship runner-up: 2009

=== Individual ===
- USL First Division MVP: 2009
- USL First Division Defender of the Year: 2008, 2009
