= Jack Stefanowski =

Polish-American soccer player and coach

Personal information
- Full name: Jack Stefanowski
- Birth name: Jacek Stefanowski
- Date of birth: 26 March 1975 (age 51)
- Place of birth: Poland

Senior career*
Years	Team	Apps	(Gls)
2006	Long Island Rough Riders	5	(0)

Managerial career
- 2007–2008: Briarcliffe Seahawks
- 2008–2009: Sevilla FC Puerto Rico
- 2009–2010: Bayamon FC
- 2013–2015: Nepal
- 2016–2017: Puerto Rico FC (assistant)
- 2018: Washington Spirit (assistant)
- 2023–: Loudoun United (goalkeeper coach)
- * Club domestic league appearances and goals

Jack Stefanowski (born March 26, 1975) is a Polish-born American soccer manager, formally head coach of the Nepal national football team and the former interim head coach of Puerto Rico national football team, also having coached various clubs in Puerto Rico. He is currently the goalkeeper coach for USL Championship side, Loudoun United

Stefanowski is a certified coach with UEFA and other football governing bodies.

== Career ==
Jack Stefanowski was born on 26 March 1975 in Poland and raised in New York.

Stefanowski graduated from New York University (NYU) in 1997 with a B.S. in physical therapy. He played for New York Wolfpacks Weston, Irish Rovers SC, Brooklyn Knights and Istria SC. At professional level, he played for Long Island Rough Riders and was an assistant coach for the Puerto Rico Islanders squad that reached the semi-finals of the CONCACAF Champions League.

== Coaching career ==
Stefanowski has 14 years of coaching experience, from college to professional level.

In February 2018, Stefanowski was brought on as an assistant/goalkeeping coach for the Washington Spirit in the NWSL, taking over for Nikki Wright.
