= Puerto Rico national football team =

Men's association football team

Puerto Rico
- Nickname(s): El Huracán Azul (The Blue Hurricane); Los Boricuas (The Boricuas)
- Association: Federación Puertorriqueña de Fútbol (FPF)
- Confederation: CONCACAF (North America)
- Sub-confederation: CFU (Caribbean)
- Head coach: Víctor Nicolás Lonchuk (caretaker)
- Captain: Leandro Antonetti
- Most caps: Ricardo Rivera (48)
- Top scorer: Ricardo Rivera (23)
- Home stadium: Estadio Juan Ramón Loubriel; Estadio Centroamericano
- FIFA code: PUR
First colors	Second colors

FIFA ranking
- Current: 155 (18 November 2026)
- Highest: 97 (March 1994)
- Lowest: 202 (November 2004)

First international
- Cuba 1–1 Puerto Rico (Havana, Cuba; November 12, 1940)

Biggest win
- Puerto Rico 9–0 Saint Martin (Port-au-Prince, Haiti; September 9, 2012)

Biggest defeat
- Netherlands Antilles 15–0 Puerto Rico (Caracas, Venezuela; January 15, 1959)

The Puerto Rico national football team (Spanish: Selección de fútbol de Puerto Rico) represents Puerto Rico in men's international football, and are governed by the Federación Puertorriqueña de Fútbol (English: Puerto Rican Football Federation). The team's nickname is El Huracán Azul meaning The Blue Hurricane. They are members of the Caribbean Football Union, and part of CONCACAF. The team has never qualified for the FIFA World Cup or the CONCACAF Gold Cup.

== History ==
=== Early years (1940s–1980s) ===
Puerto Rico played its first international match against Cuba on November 12, 1940, a game that ended in a 1–1 draw. Six years later, it participated in the 1946 Central American and Caribbean Games in Barranquilla, Colombia, its first official competition. It finished in last place, suffering some embarrassing defeats, starting with a 12–0 loss to Costa Rica. Its next five games ended in defeat: 12–1 against Panama, 4–1 against the host country, Colombia, 4–1 against Guatemala, 14–0 against the Antilles, and finally, on December 26, 1946, it closed its participation with a 6–0 loss to Venezuela. In 1959, it returned to compete in the 8th edition of the regional games in Caracas. It improved slightly on its previous performance, but this was not enough to avoid finishing last, ultimately securing fifth place.

Between 1959 and 1986, Puerto Rico was a regular participant in the Central American and Caribbean Games, competing in every edition without interruption.

They did not record a win until a 3–0 result in 1970 against the Bahamas. In 1972, Puerto Rico recorded a 1–0 win against Panama in a friendly. The 1970s saw Puerto Rico participate in its first World Cup qualifier, specifically for the 1974 FIFA World Cup. They were eliminated by Haiti, the eventual continental champions, who won with a resounding 12–0 aggregate score. Puerto Rico would not play in another qualifier until 1986. In the meantime, they hosted and participated in the 1979 Pan American Games in San Juan. Although they advanced from the group stage, they were unable to progress beyond the second round and finished in 5th place after the United States withdrew. They also hosted the 1981 CFU Championship, though they finished fourth and last in the final round.

Puerto Rico returned to the preliminary rounds of the FIFA World Cup for the 1986 World Cup qualifiers, where they were eliminated in a two-legged tie by El Salvador, who won 8–0 on aggregate. Also, at the 1986 edition in Santiago de los Caballeros, Dominican Republic, they reached the quarterfinals, losing 4–0 to an amateur team from Mexico.

Four years later they were eliminated again in the preliminary round of the 1990 World Cup qualifiers, although Jamaica prevailed by a less lopsided aggregate score of 3:1. Puerto Rican wins between the 1980s and 1990s were mainly against the Bahamas, the Dominican Republic, and Martinique.

=== 1990s ===
The most significant event of the 1990s for the Puerto Rico team was their qualification for the final stage of the Caribbean Cup in Jamaica in 1993. Drawn in the same group as the host nation, Jamaica, along with Saint Kitts and Nevis and Sint Maarten, Puerto Rico got off to a strong start, defeating Sint Maarten 3–0. Unfortunately, they lost twice by a single goal to their other two opponents, losing any chance of reaching the tournament semifinals. Puerto Rico has not yet managed to return to the group stage of the Caribbean Cup.

Chris Armas played for Puerto Rico in the 1993 Caribbean Cup. In the tournament, Puerto Rico established a 4-game win streak without conceding a goal. The competition was not then recognized by FIFA, and so his five matches were considered friendlies. As a result, he was later allowed to switch his allegiance to the United States. He would later receive 66 caps for the United States.

In the 1994 World Cup qualifiers, Puerto Rico confirmed its progress, defeating the Dominican Republic in the first round (3–2 on aggregate) with a memorable 1–2 victory in Santo Domingo on March 21, 1992. In the following round, they were eliminated again by Jamaica, who won 3–1 on aggregate. In the 1998 World Cup qualifiers, they failed to replicate their previous success, suffering a crushing 9–1 defeat to Saint Vincent and the Grenadines.

Between 1995 and 2007 Puerto Rico did not record a win, and had only four draws. During this time, the team dropped down in the FIFA Rankings to 202nd.

=== 2000s ===
Puerto Rico began the new century by losing to Aruba in the first round of the 2002 World Cup qualifiers (6–4 on aggregate). Four years later, they withdrew from the qualifiers for the 2006 World Cup, allowing Belize to advance in their place.

However, thanks to the participation of players in MLS and USL, the Puerto Rican national team significantly improved its level. In 2008, they won two games as visitors against Bermuda (1–0 and 2–0), and drew 2–2 with Trinidad and Tobago. They also won for the first time since 1994 when they beat the Dominican Republic in the first round of the World Cup qualifiers, although they lost the first leg 4–0 to Honduras, they fought a 2–2 tie in the home leg in the second round, and were therefore eliminated from contention.

The Puerto Rican Football Federation then announced plans that would have allowed them to participate in the next editions of the Caribbean Cup and CONCACAF Gold Cup.

Puerto Rico was supposed to make their debut in the 2010 Central American and Caribbean Games on home soil in Mayagüez, but due to the controversy of CONCACAF not approving the stadiums, the team couldn't compete in the football event. The team was supposed to play in Venezuela instead but due to the lack of teams, the male event was canceled.

=== 2010s ===
In the 2014 World Cup qualifiers, Puerto Rico was placed in Group D of the first round, along with Canada, Saint Kitts and Nevis, and Saint Lucia. They finished second in the group behind Canada, with 9 points. Although that total was insufficient to advance to the second round, the Blue Hurricane earned a commendable 0–0 draw in Toronto on October 11, 2011. Many of the players on the Puerto Rican national team also played for the Puerto Rico Islanders, a team in the NASL, which at the time was the second division of American soccer.

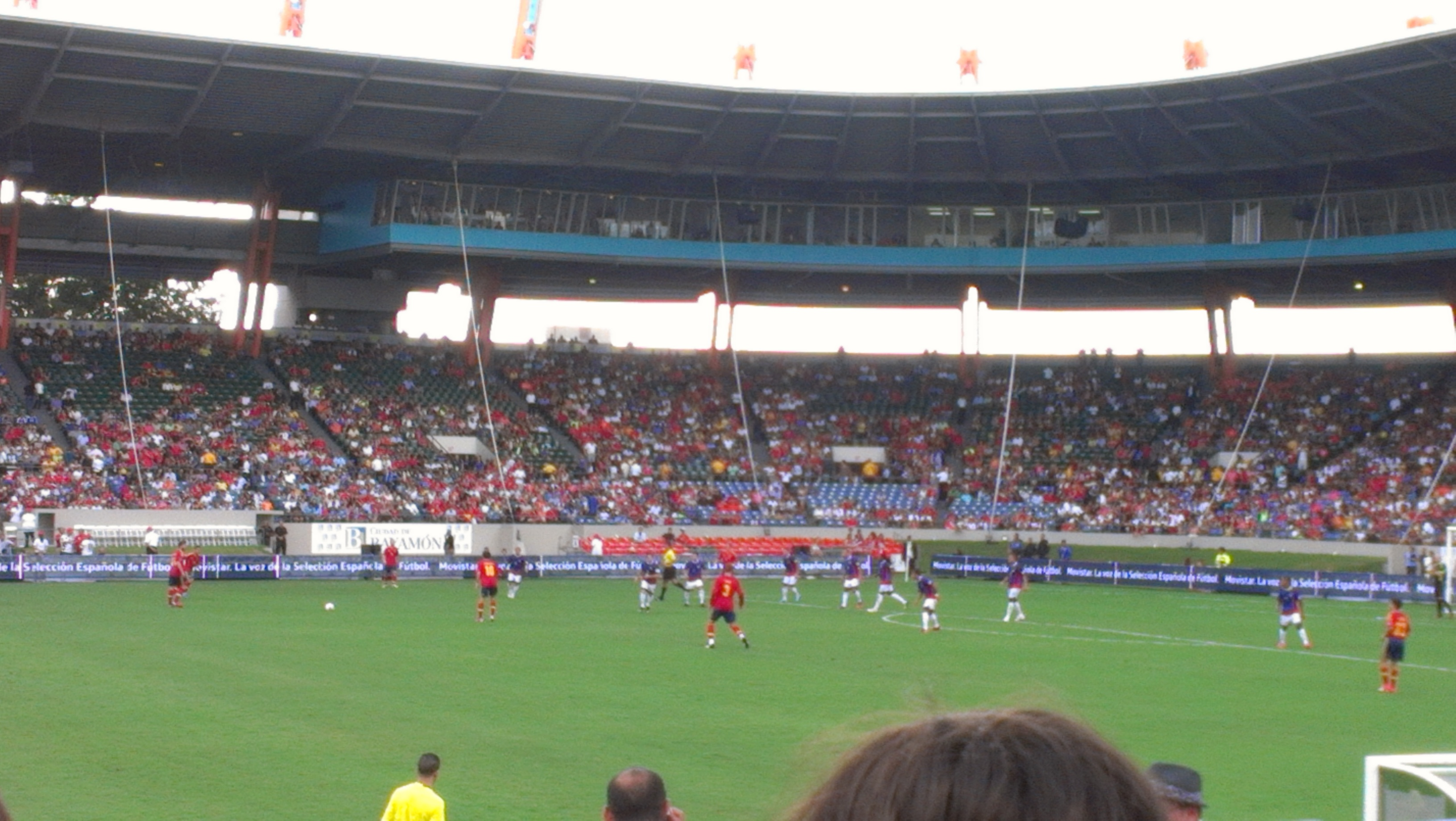
Puerto Rico (in blue) playing Spain in 2012.

On August 15, 2012, Puerto Rico hosted Spain, the reigning world and European champions, in a prestigious international friendly played at the Juan Ramón Loubriel Stadium in the city of Bayamón. Although the Spanish dominated the match, they only managed a narrow 2–1 victory (goals by Santi Cazorla and Cesc Fàbregas; Cintrón scored for Puerto Rico). It was the first time Puerto Rico had played against a world champion team and also Spain's first encounter with a Caribbean nation. The Spanish press was highly critical of the match.

On June 5, 2015, Puerto Rico played a friendly against Bermuda, their last friendly before the qualifiers for the 2018 World Cup in Russia. Puerto Rico received a bye to the second round where they faced Grenada. In the first match, in Bayamón, they secured an important 1–0 victory, but in the return leg, they lost 2–0 in Grenada, thus being eliminated from the World Cup with a 2–1 aggregate score. After losing to Grenada 2–1 in the second round of the 2018 World Cup qualifiers, Puerto Rico's Interim coach Jose 'Cukito' Martinez resigned and a few days later, the Uruguayan Carlos Avedissian solved his visa problems and could finally arrive as the head coach of the national team. On December 11, 2015, Puerto Rico played a friendly against MLS team New York City, losing 2–1.

In the 2016 Caribbean Cup, Puerto Rico began their campaign by defeating Anguilla 4–0 and losing to Guyana 1–0, which allowed them to advance to the second round. There, they achieved a 1–0 victory against Antigua and Barbuda and a draw against Grenada, whom they then defeated 4–3 in a penalty shootout. This marked Puerto Rico's historic achievement of reaching the Final Phase for the first time since 1993. In the final phase, they faced Antigua and Barbuda again, losing 3–0, and closed out the tournament with a 4–2 defeat against Curaçao.

==== Carlos Avedissian / Jack Stefanowski era ====
Uruguayan manager Carlos Avedissian took charge of the team in 2015 forming a roster mainly of players from the Puerto Rico local leagues. On May 22, 2016, Puerto Rico played a friendly match against the United States for the first time ever ending in a 3–1 loss. For discrepancies with the Federation, Avedissian was substituted by Jack Stefanowski for the second round on an interim basis. With this team mainly of local players, Puerto Rico advanced for the first time to the third round of the 2017 Caribbean Cup qualification when they defeated Grenada and Antigua and Barbuda in the second round, only two games away from reaching the CONCACAF Gold Cup for the first time. Stefanowski had to leave the technical director position because he was an assistant for Puerto Rico.

On September 3, 2016, Puerto Rico faced India for the first time in an international friendly match at the Mumbai Football Arena, but were defeated in the contest 1–4.

==== Carlos García Cantarero era ====
After Stefanowski left the team to continue with Puerto Rico, Carlos Cantarero assumed as head coach of the national team with Jose Cukito Martinez (who had coached most of the local players in the Puerto Rico League) as assistant coach. The team played three friendlies, two against the Dominican Republic and one against India, prior to the third round matches against Antigua and Barbuda and Curaçao. Coach Cantarero couldn't coach in the friendlies due to visa problems. After the second friendly against the Dominican Republic Assistant Coach Martinez left the team prior to the trip to India and David Guillemat assumed the position. Regardless of the administrative debacle, and coaching changes, Puerto Rico lost the decisive match against Curaçao after being 2–0 up front for which Curaçao as head of group advanced to the Gold Cup.

Puerto Rico didn't play an international match until the summer of 2017 when they played to a scoreless draw against Indonesia.

After the devastation of Hurricane Maria in September that left the entire island powerless. On October 7 it was reported MLS club, Orlando City SC announced a Fuerza Puerto Rico’ Friendly for November 4 with all the net proceeds from the match going towards the United for Puerto Rico initiative to raise funds and aid recovery efforts for the island. Reactivating the national team for a 3rd time this year. The friendly marked Orlando City’s last game of 2017, as well team captain, Kaká with the lions. Puerto Rico lost the exhibition match 6–1.

==== Amado Guevara era ====
In May 2018, the Puerto Rican Football Federation announced that Carlos Cantarero would no longer continue as head coach of the national team, with former Honduran player Amado Guevara taking over as head coach.

In 2018, the new CONCACAF Nations League was launched, featuring a qualification system to allocate the remaining nine spots for the 2019 Gold Cup and simultaneously place the teams in the corresponding leagues based on their final standings after four matches. Puerto Rico finished second to last in the standings, occupying 33rd place out of 34 participants, earning no points in their four matches, losing them all (1–0 vs. Saint Kitts and Nevis, Belize, and Martinique; 2–0 vs. Grenada). This placed them in League C, preventing them from qualifying for the Gold Cup.

In 2019, during the Nations League group stage, Puerto Rico was placed in Group C alongside Guatemala and Anguilla. The team performed acceptably, winning both matches against Anguilla (3–2 and 3–0, respectively) and losing both games to Guatemala (5–0).

=== 2020s ===
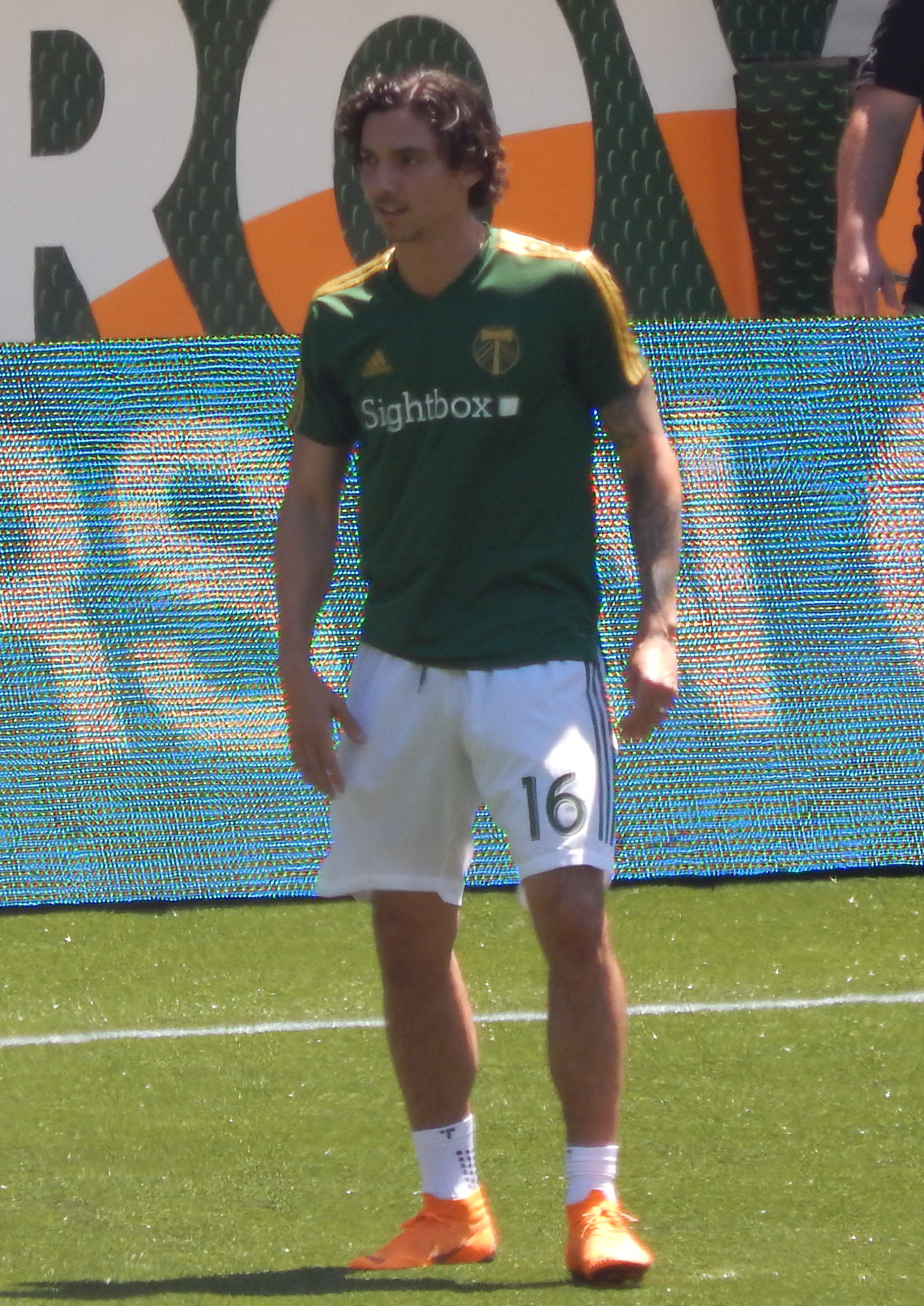
Zarek Valentin made his debut for Puerto Rico in 2021

The decade started well for Puerto Rico, where they played two friendly matches in January 2021 against the Dominican Republic, where they achieved a historic 1–0 victory in Santo Domingo and finally against Guatemala, where they lost 1–0.

However, the team would once again fail to qualify for the World Cup in 2022. In the qualifiers for this edition, the team lost away to Saint Kitts and Nevis 1–0 (in a game played in San Cristóbal in the Dominican Republic), tied with Trinidad and Tobago at home 1–1, thrashed the Bahamas 7–0 at home (both home games were played at the Athletics Stadium Mayagüez), before defeating Guyana 2–0 away (in a match played in Saint Kitts and Nevis). This wasn't enough for Puerto Rico, who was knocked out in the first round of qualification after finishing third in their group behind Trinidad and Tobago and group winners Saint Kitts and Nevis.

On March 19, 2023, just days before the Nations League, the Puerto Rican Football Federation announced Charlie Trout as the new head coach of the national team.

==== 2022–23 Nations League ====
In the second season of the CONCACAF Nations League, Puerto Rico would again be a part of the C-League. This time being inserted to Group D alongside the British Virgin Islands and the Cayman Islands. The team would go on to beat the British Islands 3–1 and then later beat the Cayman Islands 5–1. The team would go on to win the group stage, thus earning a 2023 CONCACAF Gold Cup qualification invitation and promotion into the B league for the next Nations league.

In the CONCACAF Gold Cup preliminary, the team would draw against Suriname 0–0 and later winning in a penalty shootout 4–3. In the second round of the prelims, Puerto Rico would face Martinique. The team would lose 2–0 and be eliminated from the tournament.

==== 2026 World Cup qualification campaign ====
For the 2026 FIFA World Cup qualifiers, Puerto Rico received a bye to the second round. Their campaign began with a goalless away draw against El Salvador, followed by an 8–0 thrashing of Anguilla. Puerto Rico then lost 1–0 away to Suriname before defeating Saint Vincent and the Grenadines 2–1 at home. Finishing third in their group behind Suriname and El Salvador, Puerto Rico failed to advance to the next stage.

==== 2026 FIFA Series ====
The men's competition of the 2026 FIFA Series was split into nine different sections hosted across eight countries. In November 2025, FIFA announced that Puerto Rico would host one such section in Bayamón, in which Guam, the U.S. Virgin Islands and American Samoa would also compete. The Puerto Rican section of the tournament was held in a four-match format (semi-finals, third-place match and final) in late March 2026. Puerto Rico were the section's champions after victories against Guam and the U.S. Virgin Islands in the semi-final and final, respectively.

== Results and fixtures ==
The following is a list of match results in the last 12 months, as well as any future matches that have been scheduled.

Win Draw Loss Fixture

=== 2026 ===
25 March 2026 2026 FIFA Series	Puerto Rico	4–0	Guam	Bayamón, Puerto Rico
20:00 UTC−4	W. Rivera 52', 61'; R. Rivera 57'; Antonetti 76' (pen.)	Report		Stadium: Juan Ramón Loubriel Stadium; Referee: José Corporán (Dominican Republic)

28 March 2026 2026 FIFA Series	Puerto Rico	2–0	U.S. Virgin Islands	Bayamón, Puerto Rico
20:00 UTC−4	De León 19' (pen.); Shaffer 44' (o.g.)	Report		Stadium: Juan Ramón Loubriel Stadium; Referee: Randy Encarnación (Dominican Republic)

5 June Friendly	Puerto Rico	0–3	Saudi Arabia	Austin, Texas, United States
19:00 UTC−4		Report	Mandash 45+1'; Al-Hamdan 50'; S. Al-Dawsari 88'	Stadium: Q2 Stadium; Referee: Reon Radix (Grenada)

24 September 2026 Nations League B	Puerto Rico	0–1	Guyana	Roseau, Dominica
15:00			De Rosario 78' (pen.)	Stadium: Windsor Park; Attendance: 200; Referee: Reginald Gumbs (Saint Kitts and Nevis)

27 September 2026 Nations League B	Dominica	0–2	Puerto Rico	Roseau, Dominica
20:00		Report	Sulia 4'; W. Rivera 37'	Stadium: Windsor Park; Attendance: 2,131; Referee: Norberto Da Silva (Curaçao)

1 October 2026 Nations League B	Cayman Islands	0–3	Puerto Rico	Mayagüez, Puerto Rico
20:00		Report	R. Rivera 26'; W. Rivera 45'; Antonetti 90+3' (pen.)	Stadium: Mayagüez Athletics Stadium; Attendance: 1,575; Referee: Benjamín Pineda (Costa Rica)

4 October 2026 Nations League B	Puerto Rico	1–0	Cayman Islands	Mayagüez, Puerto Rico
18:00	de León 64'	Report		Stadium: Mayagüez Athletics Stadium; Attendance: 1,755; Referee: Julio Luna (Guatemala)

13 November 2026 Nations League B	Puerto Rico	4–2	Dominica	Georgetown, Guyana
15:00 UTC−4	R. Rivera 38' (pen.); W. Rivera 56'; Díaz 83'; Rosario 87'	Report	Sharpe 77'; Cuffy 90+1'	Stadium: Synthetic Track and Field Facility; Referee: Victor Rivas (United States)

16 November 2026 Nations League B	Guyana	4–2	Puerto Rico	Georgetown Guyana
14:00 (15:00 UTC−4)	I. Jones 51'; De Rosario 59' (pen.); Duke-McKenna 73'; Moore 76'	Report	W. Rivera 14'; R. Rivera 75'	Stadium: Synthetic Track and Field Facility, Referee: Kwinsi Williams (Trinidad and Tobago)

== Coaching staff ==
As of 12 November 2026

Role	Name	Since
Sporting director	(Puerto Rico) Eduardo Jiménez	26 May 2026
Head coach	(Argentina) Víctor Nicolás Lonchuk (caretaker)	12 November 2026
Assistant coach	Vacant	12 November 2026
Goalkeeping coach	Vacant	7 March 2026

=== Coaching history ===
Caretaker managers are listed in italics.

- (Puerto Rico) Eduardo Ordóñez Munguira (1959)
- (Puerto Rico) Raúl Marchant González (1966)
- (Puerto Rico) Egberto Morales Carrasco (1972)
- (Spain) / (Puerto Rico) Luis Villarejo (1974–1975)
- (Argentina) Carlos Martinolli (1978–1979)
- (Puerto Rico) Joe Serralta (1979–1982)
- (Puerto Rico) Juan "Saso" Tullier (1982–1984)
- (Argentina) Ricardo "Richie" Romano (1985–1990)
- (Brazil) Víctor Hugo Barros (1990–1991)
- (United States) Arnie Ramirez (1992)
- (Puerto Rico) Oscar Rosa (1992)
- (Puerto Rico) Cristóbal Vaccaro (1996)
- (Spain) José Luis "Majo" Rodríguez (1999)
- (Brazil) Raimundo Gatinho (2000)
- (Costa Rica) Toribio Rojas (2002–2003)
- (Brazil) Víctor Hugo Barros (2004)
- (Northern Ireland) Colin Clarke (2007–2011)
- (United States) Jack Stefanowski (2011)
- (England) Adrian Whitbread (2011)
- (Costa Rica) Jeaustin Campos (2011–2013)
- (Brazil) Víctor Hugo Barros (2013–2014)
- (Puerto Rico) José "Cukito" Martinez (2015)
- (Uruguay) Carlos Avedissian (2015–2016)
- (United States) Jack Stefanowski (2016)
- (Spain) Carlos García Cantarero (2016–2018)
- (Honduras) Amado Guevara (2018–2019)
- (Costa Rica) Elgy Morales (2019–2021)
- (United States) Dave Sarachan (2021–2022)
- (England) Charlie Trout (2023–2026)
- (United States) Jay Mims (2026)
- (Argentina) Víctor Nicolás Lonchuk (2026-present)

== Players ==
=== Current squad ===
The following players were called up for the 2026–27 CONCACAF Nations League B against Guyana, Dominica, and the Cayman Islands from September 24th to November 13th.

Caps and goals updated as of May 12, 2026.

No.	Pos.	Player	Date of birth (age)	Caps	Goals	Club
	GK	Sebastián Cutler	May 20, 2003 (age 23)	5	0	Free agent
	GK	Aurie Echevarría Briscoe	June 26, 2001 (age 25)	0	0	(United States Soccer Federation) Fort Wayne FC
	GK	Joel Serrano	May 17, 1999 (age 27)	22	0	(Puerto Rican Football Federation) Academia Quintana
	DF	Nicolás Cardona	February 14, 1998 (age 28)	28	1	(United States Soccer Federation) El Paso Locomotive FC
	DF	Giovanni Calderón	September 15, 2000 (age 26)	16	0	(United States Soccer Federation) Real Monarchs
	DF	Callum Stretch	September 18, 1999 (age 27)	3	0	(United States Soccer Federation) Las Vegas Lights FC
	DF	André Cutler	May 20, 2003 (age 23)	0	0	(Malta Football Association) Victoria Wanderers
	DF	Sidney Paris	March 10, 2002 (age 24)	11	0	(United States Soccer Federation) St. Louis City 2
	DF	Rodolfo Sulia	August 8, 2002 (age 24)	22	3	(United States Soccer Federation) FC Naples
	DF	Beto Ydrach	November 20, 2002 (age 24)	13	1	(United States Soccer Federation) Pittsburgh Riverhounds
	MF	Steven Echevarria	August 19, 2000 (age 26)	5	0	(United States Soccer Federation) Colorado Springs Switchbacks FC
	MF	Gerald Díaz	March 23, 1999 (age 27)	35	12	(United States Soccer Federation) Miami FC
	MF	Juan O'Neill	July 12, 1998 (age 28)	21	0	(Puerto Rican Football Federation) Academia Quintana
	MF	Ignacio Antonetti	February 2, 2008 (age 18)	3	0	(Royal Spanish Football Federation) SD Compostela
	MF	Jeremy de León	September 30, 2004 (age 22)	6	3	(Royal Spanish Football Federation) UE Sant Andreu
	MF	Wilfredo Rivera	October 14, 2003 (age 23)	27	7	(Argentine Football Association) Barracas Central
	MF	Jaden Servania	July 16, 2001 (age 25)	26	2	(United States Soccer Federation) Brooklyn FC
	MF	Ian Charles	February 8, 2007 (age 19)	0	0	(United States Soccer Federation) North Texas SC
	MF	Dante Williams	November 19, 2003 (age 23)	0	0	(Puerto Rican Football Federation) Academia Quintana
	FW	Ricardo Rivera	April 17, 1997 (age 29)	38	19	(Puerto Rican Football Federation) Academia Quintana
	FW	Leandro Antonetti	January 1, 2003 (age 23)	20	6	(Portuguese Football Federation) Estrela da Amadora
	FW	Christian Vargas	April 7, 1999 (age 27)	0	0	(Puerto Rican Football Federation) Metropolitan FA
	FW	Lazzar Ramos	July 23, 2007 (age 19)	0	0	(United States Soccer Federation) Mohave College

=== Recent call-ups ===
Pos.	Player	Date of birth (age)	Caps	Goals	Club	Latest call-up
GK	Nicolás Aristizábal	May 2, 2008 (age 18)	0	0	(United States) Georgia Southern University	2026 FIFA Series, 16 March 2026
DF	Diego Rossi	May 19, 2005 (age 21)	0	0	(Croatia) NK Istra 1961	v. Argentina, 14 October 2025
DF	David Marrero	August 1, 2005 (age 21)	0	0	Puerto Rico Surf	2026 FIFA Series, 16 March 2026
DF	Gamaliel Ortiz	September 14, 2007 (age 19)	0	0	(United States) Bentley Falcons	2026 FIFA Series, 16 March 2026
DF	Adyn Torres	November 13, 2007 (age 19)	2	0	(Estonia) Nõmme United	2026 FIFA Series, 16 March 2026
MF	Isaac Angking	January 24, 2000 (age 26)	15	4	Free agent	v. Argentina, 14 October 2025
MF	Darren Ríos	October 14, 1995 (age 31)	34	6	Free agent	v. Argentina, 14 October 2025
MF	Adrián Biaggi	April 13, 2005 (age 21)	7	0	(United States) UIC	v. Argentina, 14 October 2025
MF	Noeh Hernández	December 9, 2004 (age 21)	12	1	(United States) DePaul Blue Demons	2026 FIFA Series, 16 March 2026
MF	Benjamín Donato	July 5, 2005 (age 21)	7	0	(United States) Stetson Hatters	2026 FIFA Series, 16 March 2026
FW	Isaiah Vicentti	March 28, 2008 (age 18)	0	0	(United States) Inter Miami CF Academy	2026 FIFA Series, 16 March 2026

== Player records ==
As of October 14, 2025
Players in bold are still active with Puerto Rico.

=== Most appearances ===
Rank	Player	Caps	Goals	Career
1	**Gerald Díaz**	39	13	2017–present
1	**Ricardo Rivera**	39	19	2016–present
3	**Darren Ríos**	38	7	2016–present
4	Héctor Ramos	36	18	2010–2019
5	Andrés Cabrero	35	4	2008–2018
6	Jackie Marrero	32	6	2011–2019
7	Alexis Rivera	31	0	2004–2016
8	**Nicolás Cardona**	27	1	2021–present
9	**Juan O'Neill**	25	0	2017–present
9	**Wilfredo Rivera**	25	5	2021–present

=== Top goalscorers ===
Rank	Player	Goals	Caps	Ratio	Career
1	**Ricardo Rivera**	19	39	0.49	2016–present
2	Héctor Ramos	18	36	0.5	2010–2019
3	**Gerald Díaz**	13	39	0.33	2017–present
4	**Darren Ríos**	7	38	0.18	2016–present
5	Chris Megaloudis	6	20	0.3	2008–2012
5	Jackie Marrero	6	32	0.19	2011–2019
7	**Leandro Antonetti**	5	18	0.28	2022–present
7	Marcos Lugris	5	20	0.25	1983–1998
7	Cristian Arrieta	5	22	0.23	2010–2015
7	**Wilfredo Rivera**	5	25	0.2	2021–present

== Competitive record ==
=== FIFA World Cup ===
FIFA World Cup									Qualification					
Year	Round	Position	Pld	W	D	L	GF	GA	Pld	W	D	L	GF	GA
(Uruguay) 1930 to (Sweden) 1958	Not a FIFA member								Not a FIFA member					
(Chile) 1962 to (Mexico) 1970	Did not enter								Did not enter					
(West Germany) 1974	Did not qualify								2	0	0	2	0	12
(Argentina) 1978 and (Spain) 1982	Did not enter								Did not enter					
(Mexico) 1986	Did not qualify								2	0	0	2	0	8
(Italy) 1990	Did not qualify								2	0	0	2	1	3
(United States) 1994	Did not qualify								4	1	1	2	4	5
(France) 1998	Did not qualify								2	0	0	2	1	9
(South Korea) (Japan) 2002	Did not qualify								2	0	1	1	4	6
(Germany) 2006	Did not enter								Did not enter					
(South Africa) 2010	Did not qualify								3	1	1	1	3	6
(Brazil) 2014	Did not qualify								6	2	3	1	8	4
(Russia) 2018	Did not qualify								2	1	0	1	1	2
(Qatar) 2022	Did not qualify								4	2	1	1	10	2
(Canada) (Mexico) (United States) 2026	Did not qualify								4	2	1	1	10	2
(Morocco) (Portugal) (Spain) 2030	To be determined								To be determined					
(Saudi Arabia) 2034	To be determined								To be determined					
Total		0/16							33	9	8	16	42	59

=== CONCACAF Gold Cup ===
CONCACAF Championship & Gold Cup record
Year	Round	Position	Pld	W	D	L	GF	GA
(El Salvador) 1963	Did not enter							
(Guatemala) 1965	Did not enter							
(Honduras) 1967	Did not enter							
(Costa Rica) 1969	Did not enter							
(Trinidad and Tobago) 1971	Did not enter							
(Haiti) 1973	Did not enter							
(Mexico) 1977	Did not enter							
(Honduras) 1981	Did not enter							
1985	Did not enter							
1989	Did not enter							
(United States) 1991	Did not qualify							
(Mexico) (United States) 1993	Did not qualify							
(United States) 1996	Did not qualify							
(United States) 1998	Did not qualify							
(United States) 2000	Did not qualify							
(United States) 2002	Did not qualify							
(Mexico) (United States) 2003	Did not qualify							
(United States) 2005	Did not qualify							
(United States) 2007	Did not enter							
(United States) 2009	Did not enter							
(United States) 2011	Did not qualify							
(United States) 2013	Did not qualify							
(Canada) (United States) 2015	Did not qualify							
(United States) 2017	Did not qualify							
(Costa Rica) (Jamaica) (United States) 2019	Did not qualify							
(United States) 2021	Did not qualify							
(Canada) (United States) 2023	Did not qualify							
(Canada) (United States) 2025	Did not qualify							
(Canada) (United States) 2027	To be determined							
Total		0/28						

=== CONCACAF Nations League ===
CONCACAF Nations League record
League											Finals								
Season	Division	Group	Pld	W	D	L	GF	GA	P/R		Finals	Result	Pld	W	D	L	GF	GA	Squad
2019–20	C	C	4	2	0	2	6	12	Same position		(United States) 2021	Ineligible							
2022–23	C	D	4	4	0	0	17	2	▲		(United States) 2023	Ineligible							
2023–24	B	D	6	4	0	2	22	10	Same position		(United States) 2024	Ineligible							
2024–25	B	C	6	3	0	3	11	12	Same position		(United States) 2025	Ineligible							
2026–27	B	A	6	4	0	2	12	7	Same position		(United States) 2027								
Total	—	—	26	17	0	9	68	43	—	Total	0 Titles	—	—	—	—	—	—	—	—

CONCACAF Nations League history
First match	Puerto Rico 0–5 Guatemala (September 10, 2019; Mayagüez, Puerto Rico)
Biggest win	Puerto Rico 6–0 British Virgin Islands (June 12, 2022; Mayagüez, Puerto Rico)
Biggest defeat	Puerto Rico 0–5 Guatemala (September 10, 2019; Mayagüez, Puerto Rico); Guatemala 5–0 Puerto Rico (November 16, 2019; Guatemala City, Guatemala)
Best result	—
Worst result	—

=== Pan American Games ===
Pan American Games record
Year	Round	Position	Pld	W	D	L	GF	GA
(Argentina) 1951	Did not enter							
(Mexico) 1955	Did not enter							
(United States) 1959	Did not enter							
(Brazil) 1963	Did not enter							
(Canada) 1967	Did not enter							
(Colombia) 1971	Did not enter							
(Mexico) 1975	Did not enter							
(Puerto Rico) 1979	Round 2	5th	4	1	0	3	2	12
(Venezuela) 1983	Did not enter							
(United States) 1987	Did not enter							
(Cuba) 1991	Did not enter							
(Argentina) 1995	Did not enter							
(Canada) 1999	Did not enter							
(Dominican Republic) 2003	Did not qualify							
(Brazil) 2007	Did not enter							
(Mexico) 2011	Did not qualify							
(Canada) 2015	Did not qualify							
(Peru) 2019	Did not qualify							
(Chile) 2023	Did not qualify							
(Peru) 2027	To be determined							
Total	Round 2	1/19	4	1	0	3	2	12

=== Inactive tournaments ===
==== CFU Caribbean Cup ====
The Caribbean Cup was replaced with the CONCACAF Nations League.

CFU Championship & Caribbean Cup record									Qualification record					
Year	Round	Position	Pld	W	D	L	GF	GA	Pld	W	D	L	GF	GA
(Trinidad and Tobago) 1978	Did not qualify								2	0	1	1	1	2
(Suriname) 1979	Did not enter								Did not enter					
(Puerto Rico) 1981	Fourth place	4th	3	0	1	2	1	9	Qualified as host					
(French Guiana) 1983	Did not enter								Did not enter					
(Barbados) 1985	Did not enter								Did not enter					
(Martinique) 1988	Did not enter								Did not enter					
(Barbados) 1989	Did not enter								Did not enter					
(Trinidad and Tobago) 1990	Did not enter								Did not enter					
(Jamaica) 1991	Did not qualify								2	0	0	2	3	6
(Trinidad and Tobago) 1992	Did not enter								Did not enter					
(Jamaica) 1993	Group stage	6th	3	0	1	2	7	14	3	3	0	0	7	0
(Trinidad and Tobago) 1994	Did not qualify								2	1	0	1	1	2
(Cayman Islands) (Jamaica) 1995	Did not qualify								3	0	1	2	3	14
(Trinidad and Tobago) 1996	Did not enter								Did not enter					
(Antigua and Barbuda) (Saint Kitts and Nevis) 1997	Withdrew								Withdrew					
(Jamaica) (Trinidad and Tobago) 1998	Did not qualify								2	0	0	2	1	7
(Trinidad and Tobago) 1999	Did not qualify								3	0	0	3	0	9
(Trinidad and Tobago) 2001	Did not qualify								2	0	1	1	1	2
(Barbados) 2005	Did not qualify								3	0	1	2	3	11
(Trinidad and Tobago) 2007	Did not enter								Did not enter					
(Jamaica) 2008	Did not enter								Did not enter					
(Martinique) 2010	Did not qualify								6	3	0	3	10	8
(Antigua and Barbuda) 2012	Did not qualify								6	2	0	4	15	12
(Jamaica) 2014	Did not qualify								3	0	2	1	5	6
(Martinique) 2017	Did not qualify								6	1	2	3	11	11
Total	Fourth place	2/25	6	0	2	4	8	23	43	10	8	25	61	80

== Honours ==
Friendly

- FIFA Series
  - (gold) Champions (1): 2026 Puerto Rico

== Team image ==
=== Kit sponsorship ===
Kit supplier	Period	Contract duration	Notes
(Brazil) RR Sports	2006-2007		
(Spain) Joma	2008		
Unknown	2009-2016		
(Pakistan) Forward Sports	2014-2017		
(England) Admiral Sportswear (Indonesia) SPECS Sport	2017		
(Spain) Joma	2018–2024		
(Denmark) Hummel	2024–2026		
(United States) Stimulus Athletic	2026		

=== Crest ===
Crest used by the team from 2013 to 2024.

Current Crest used by the team since 2024.

=== Historical Kits ===
==== 2000-10s ====
RR; 2006 Home	Forward; 2014 Home	Forward; 2014 Away	Admiral; 2017 Home	Admiral; 2017 Away	Joma; 2018 Away	Joma; 2018 Home

==== 2020s ====
Joma; 2021 Home	Joma; 2021 Away	Joma; 2021 Alternate	Hummel; 2024 Home	Hummel; 2024 Away	Hummel; 2024 Alternate	Stimulus; 2026 Home	Stimulus; 2026 Away	Stimulus; 2026 Alternate

== See also ==
- Puerto Rico national under-20 football team
- Puerto Rico national under-17 football team
- Football in Puerto Rico
