= Kendall Jagdeosingh =

Trinidad and Tobago footballer

Personal information
- Full name: Kendall Maurice Jagdeosingh
- Date of birth: May 30, 1986 (age 40)
- Place of birth: Manzanilla, Trinidad and Tobago
- Height: 5 ft 11 in (1.80 m)
- Position: Forward

Team information
- Current team: Ayutthaya
- Number: 11

Senior career*
Years	Team	Apps	(Gls)
2004–2005	North East Stars	0	(0)
2006	Caledonia AIA	0	(0)
2007	North East Stars	0	(0)
2008–2010	Puerto Rico Islanders	71	(9)
2011	Rochester Rhinos	22	(5)
2012–2013	Chainat	28	(10)
2014	Trat	11	(6)
2014	Phuket	9	(9)
2015	Ang Thong	16	(7)
2015	TTM	0	(0)
2016	Satun United	9	(1)
2016	Ayutthaya	2	(0)
2017	Ayutthaya United	25	(12)
2018	Sakaeo F.C.	0	(0)
2018	Ayutthaya	0	(0)

International career^{‡}
2006–2012	Trinidad and Tobago	12	(0)
- * Club domestic league appearances and goals as of May 21, 2017 ‡ National team caps and goals as of November 15, 2013

Kendall Jagdeosingh (born May 30, 1986 in Manzanilla) is a Trinidadian footballer who currently plays for Ayutthaya in Thai League 3

== Career ==
=== Club ===
Jagdeosingh began his career in his native Trinidad, playing four seasons for North East Stars and Caledonia AIA in the TT Pro League.

Jagdeosingh joined the Puerto Rico Islanders in the USL First Division in 2007. He helped the Islanders win the 2008 USL First Division regular season title and progressed to the semi-finals of the CONCACAF Champions League 2008–09.

On February 16, 2011, Jagdeosingh signed with Rochester Rhinos of the third division USL Pro league. The contract is for one year with a club option for 2012.

In March 2012, Jagdeosing signed with Chainat F.C. alongside fellow Trinidad national Yohance Marshall.

=== International ===
Jagdeosingh played for the Trinidadian national U-20 U-21 U-23 team, and was part of the Trinidad squad which competed at the 2007 CONCACAF Gold Cup. He also participated in several of Trinidad's early qualifying games for the 2010 FIFA World Cup, and qualifying games for the 2014 FIFA World Cup and an international friendly against Finland on January 22, 2012.

== Honors ==
=== Puerto Rico Islanders ===
- USSF Division 2 Pro League Champions (1): 2010
- Commissioner's Cup Winners (1): 2008
- CFU Club Championship Winner (1): 2010
