= Sandy Gbandi =

Liberian footballer (born 1983)

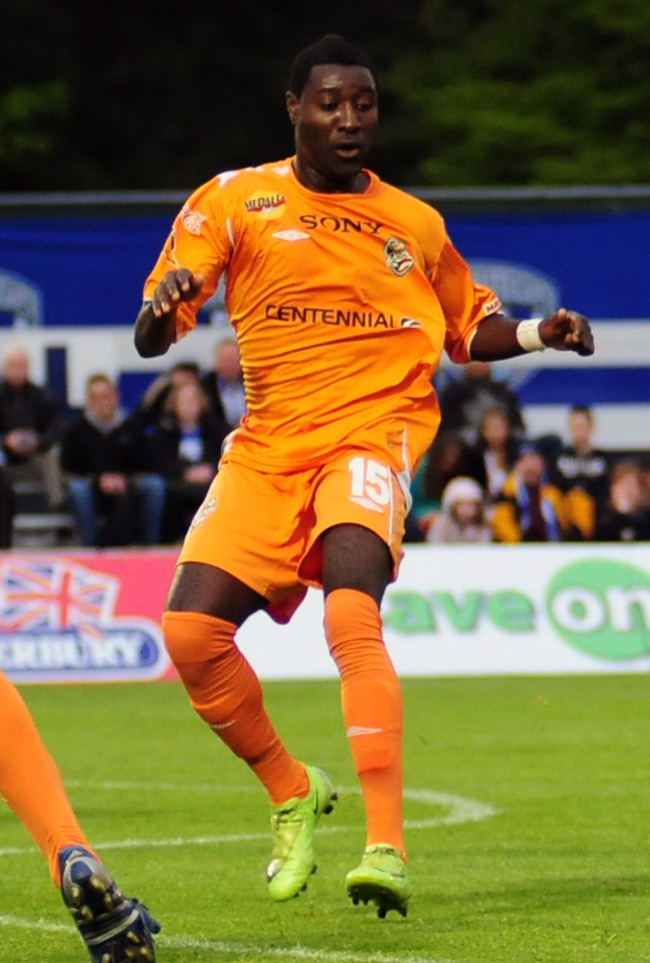

Personal information
- Full name: Sandy Hena Gbandi Junior
- Date of birth: July 12, 1983 (age 43)
- Place of birth: Harbel, Liberia
- Height: 5 ft 10 in (1.78 m)
- Position: Midfielder

Youth career
- 2002–2006: UAB Blazers

Senior career*
| Years | Team | Apps | (Gls) |
| 2007 | FC Dallas | 0 | (0) |
| 2008–2010 | Puerto Rico Islanders | 76 | (6) |
| 2011 | NSC Minnesota Stars | 5 | (0) |
- * Club domestic league appearances and goals as of July 15, 2011

Sandy Gbandi (born July 12, 1983, in Harbel) is a Liberian former footballer.

== Career ==
=== Early life and college ===
Born near the Firestone rubber plantation, Gbandi and his family fled from his native Liberia to Houston, Texas following the outbreak of the First Liberian Civil War in 1989, when he was just six years old. Gbandi went on to attend Jersey Village High School, played club football for the Houston Dynamos and the Houston Texans as a youth, and played four years of college soccer at University of Alabama at Birmingham. Gbandi played in 56 games for UAB, scoring 10 goals and adding 14 assists. As a sophomore in 2004 he was selected First Team All-Conference USA and then was named Second Team All-Conference USA a year later.

=== Professional ===
Gbandi left school early when he was selected in the 2007 MLS Supplemental Draft by FC Dallas, but he never saw any first team-minutes with the team, and was waived at the end of the season.

Gbandi signed with the Puerto Rico Islanders in the USL First Division in 2008, helping the Islanders win the 2008 USL First Division regular season title and progressed to the semi-finals of the CONCACAF Champions League 2008–09. Gbandi stayed with Puerto Rico through the 2010 season.

On March 15, 2011, Gbandi signed with NSC Minnesota Stars of the second division North American Soccer League. He was released by the club on November 29, 2011.

== Personal ==
Sandy's brother, Chris Gbandi, is also a former professional footballer, who was selected to compete for the Liberian national team in the 2006 World Cup qualifiers. The two brothers played together at FC Dallas in 2007 and against each other in 2010, when Chris joined Miami FC.

== Honors ==
=== Puerto Rico Islanders ===
- USSF Division 2 Pro League Champions (1): 2010
- Commissioner's Cup Winners (1): 2008
- CFU Club Championship Winner (1): 2010
