= List of Trinidadian football transfers 2011–12 =

Trinidadian football transfers

This is a list of Trinidadian football transfers during the 2011–12 season. Only moves featuring at least one TT Pro League club are listed. Transfers that were made following the conclusion of the 2010–11 season on 1 February 2011, during the 2011–12 season, and following the season until 30 June 2012, are listed.

Players without a club cannot join one at any time, either during or in between transfer windows. Clubs within or outside the Pro League may sign players on loan at any time. If need be, clubs may sign a goalkeeper on an emergency loan, if all others are unavailable.

== Transfers ==
All players and clubs without with a flag are from Trinidad and Tobago. In addition, transfers involving Major League Soccer clubs in the United States and Canada technically have the league as the second party and not the listed club. MLS player contracts are owned by the league and not by individual clubs.

Date	Player	Moving from	Moving to	Fee
6 February 2011	Robert Primus	San Juan Jabloteh	(Kazakhstan) FC Aktobe	Undisclosed
25 February 2011	Nigel Daniel	Joe Public	Ma Pau	Free
4 March 2011	Juma Clarence	Unattached	Caledonia AIA	Free
4 March 2011	Daneil Cyrus	1.FC Santa Rosa	Caledonia AIA	Loan
11 March 2011	Cordell Cato	San Juan Jabloteh	Defence Force	Free
18 March 2011	Aubrey David	FC South End	Joe Public	Free
18 March 2011	Kevin Molino	Ma Pau	(United States) Orlando City SC	Free
24 March 2011	Kevon Woodley	Unattached	Caledonia AIA	Free
25 March 2011	Conrad Smith	Joe Public	(Canada) FC Edmonton	Free
7 April 2011	(Guyana) Walter Moore	Caledonia AIA	(United States) Charlotte Eagles	Loan
10 April 2011	Lester Peltier	Ma Pau	(Slovakia) Trenčín	Free
17 April 2011	(Antigua and Barbuda) Gayson Gregory	Joe Public	(Antigua and Barbuda) Antigua Barracuda FC	Free
18 April 2011	Cornell Glen	Unattached	Caledonia AIA	Free
3 June 2011	(Jamaica) Kimarley McDonald	North East Stars	(Antigua and Barbuda) Antigua Barracuda FC	Free
24 June 2011	(Jamaica) Sean Fraser	North East Stars	(El Salvador) Once Municipal	Free
29 June 2011	Clyde Leon	W Connection	T&TEC	Free
7 July 2011	Kerry Baptiste	Joe Public	(United States) FC Tampa Bay	Free
18 July 2011	Clayton Ince	Ma Pau	T&TEC	Free
22 July 2011	Radanfah Abu Bakr	Joe Public	(Belgium) Olympic de Charleroi-Marchienne	Free
26 July 2011	Andrei Pacheco	W Connection	T&TEC	Free
26 July 2011	Romauld Aguillera	W Connection	T&TEC	Free
26 July 2011	Kelvin Modeste	FC South End	T&TEC	Free
26 July 2011	Wesley John	W Connection	T&TEC	Free
26 July 2011	Akeem Adams	W Connection	T&TEC	Free
26 July 2011	(Guyana) Vurlon Mills	St. John's United	T&TEC	Free
26 July 2011	Kerlon Ferguson	Castara Goal City	T&TEC	Free
27 July 2011	Marvin Oliver	Unattached	San Juan Jabloteh	Free
27 July 2011	Ishmael Daniel	Caledonia AIA	North East Stars	Free
27 July 2011	Stephan Stoute	WASA	North East Stars	Free
27 July 2011	Kevin Jagdeosingh	Defence Force	North East Stars	Free
28 July 2011	(Jamaica) Leon Gordon	(Jamaica) Tivoli Gardens	North East Stars	Free
28 July 2011	Aaron Ali	Biche United	North East Stars	Free
4 August 2011	Clyde Leon	T&TEC	(Colombia) Itagüí Ditaires	Undisclosed
7 August 2011	Makan Hislop	Joe Public	St. Clair Coaching School	Free
7 August 2011	Mekeil Williams	Ma Pau	W Connection	Free
10 August 2011	Jerol Forbes	Unattached	San Juan Jabloteh	Free
10 August 2011	Devon Jamerson	Unattached	San Juan Jabloteh	Free
10 August 2011	Nigel Daniel	Ma Pau	San Juan Jabloteh	Free
10 August 2011	Randy Britto	Police	San Juan Jabloteh	Free
10 August 2011	Kerron Edward	WASA	San Juan Jabloteh	Free
18 August 2011	Anton Hutchinson	San Juan Jabloteh	Police	Free
19 August 2011	Seon Power	Ma Pau	North East Stars	Free
20 August 2011	Jerrel Britto	San Juan Jabloteh	W Connection	Free
20 August 2011	Aquilius Sylvester	FC South End	W Connection	Free
20 August 2011	Andre Quashie	Joe Public	W Connection	Free
30 August 2011	Trevin Caesar	Ma Pau	Caledonia AIA	Free
30 August 2011	Aquil Selby	Ma Pau	Caledonia AIA	Free
30 August 2011	Micah Lewis	Joe Public	Caledonia AIA	Free
31 August 2011	Stern John	Unattached	North East Stars	Free
8 September 2011	Trent Noel	Joe Public	St. Ann's Rangers	Free
8 September 2011	Errol McFarlane	North East Stars	St. Ann's Rangers	Free
8 September 2011	Jevon Morris	Joe Public	St. Ann's Rangers	Free
8 September 2011	(Colombia) Jaime Andres Ruiz	(Colombia) Bucaramanga	St. Ann's Rangers	Free
8 September 2011	Mikhail Awai	San Juan Jabloteh	St. Ann's Rangers	Free
8 September 2011	Marvin Springer	San Juan Jabloteh	St. Ann's Rangers	Free
8 September 2011	Keon Peters	San Juan Jabloteh	St. Ann's Rangers	Free
8 September 2011	Kareem Moses	Joe Public	St. Ann's Rangers	Free
8 September 2011	Jamal Gay	Unattached	Caledonia AIA	Free
15 September 2011	Carlyle Mitchell	Joe Public	(Canada) Vancouver Whitecaps FC	Undisclosed
22 September 2011	Densill Theobald	Caledonia AIA	(India) Dempo	Undisclosed
2 October 2011	David Atiba Charles	Unattached	Caledonia AIA	Free
3 December 2011	Marvin Phillip	W Connection	T&TEC	Undisclosed
6 December 2011	Ryan Stewart	Caledonia AIA	North East Stars	Free
7 December 2011	Kerry Baptiste	(United States) FC Tampa Bay	T&TEC	Undisclosed
7 December 2011	Ataullah Guerra	Unattached	Caledonia AIA	Free
7 December 2011	Devorn Jorsling	(United States) Orlando City SC	Caledonia AIA	Free
8 December 2011	Keion Goodridge	Unattached	North East Stars	Free
8 December 2011	Larry Bacchus	Unattached	St. Ann's Rangers	Free
8 December 2011	Cameron Roget	(United States) San Diego Boca	St. Ann's Rangers	Free
10 December 2011	Cornell Glen	Caledonia AIA	(Vietnam) Sông Lam Nghệ An	Free
13 December 2011	Hughton Hector	W Connection	(Vietnam) Sông Lam Nghệ An	Loan
20 December 2011	Kwame Wiltshire	San Juan Jabloteh	Caroni Samba	Free
20 December 2011	Nigel Daniel	San Juan Jabloteh	Caroni Samba	Free
4 January 2012	(Brazil) Thiago Faria	(Brazil) Ituano Futebol Clube	North East Stars	Free
5 January 2012	Shahdon Winchester	W Connection	(Vietnam) Sông Lam Nghệ An	Loan
5 January 2012	Trent Noel	St. Ann's Rangers	Police	Free
5 January 2012	Vernell Ramirez	Unattached	Police	Free
5 January 2012	Trent Lougheed	Unattached	Police	Free
5 January 2012	Wesley John	T&TEC	Police	Free
5 January 2012	Andre Toussaint	Unattached	T&TEC	Free
5 January 2012	Kareem Smith	(Puerto Rico) FC Leones	T&TEC	Free
5 January 2012	Jayson Joseph	W Connection	T&TEC	Free
5 January 2012	Andre Marchan	W Connection	North East Stars	Loan
5 January 2012	Hector Sam	San Juan Jabloteh	St. Ann's Rangers	Free
17 January 2012	Cordell Cato	Defence Force	(United States) Seattle Sounders FC	Undisclosed
23 January 2012	Conrad Smith	(Canada) FC Edmonton	Caledonia AIA	Free
28 January 2012	Jason Devenish	Queen's Park	North East Stars	Free
12 February 2012	Gary Glasgow	Unattached	North East Stars	Free
22 February 2012	Mekeil Williams	W Connection	(Poland) Pogoń Szczecin	Loan
23 February 2012	(Brazil) Jerónimo Wendes de Sousa	(Brazil) Clube Atlético Bragantino	North East Stars	Free
19 April 2012	(Saint Lucia) Zaine Pierre	W Connection	(Italy) Genoa Primavera	Undisclosed
30 April 2012	Willis Plaza	San Juan Jabloteh	(Vietnam) Navibank Sài Gòn	Loan
1 May 2012	(Saint Vincent and the Grenadines) Cornelius Stewart	Unattached	Caledonia AIA	Free
12 May 2012	Kareem Smith	T&TEC	(United States) FC Tucson	Free
14 June 2012	Andrei Pacheco	T&TEC	W Connection	Free
18 June 2012	Glenroy Samuel	(Antigua and Barbuda) All Saints United	Caledonia AIA	Free
18 June 2012	Daneil Cyrus	1.FC Santa Rosa	W Connection	Free
19 June 2012	Densill Theobald	(India) Dempo	Caledonia AIA	Free
19 June 2012	Radanfah Abu Bakr	(Belgium) Olympic de Charleroi-Marchienne	Caledonia AIA	Free
19 June 2012	(Guyana) Ronson Williams	(Guyana) Alpha United FC	Caledonia AIA	Free
22 June 2012	Kerry Baptiste	Unattached	North East Stars	Free
22 June 2012	Micah Lewis	Unattached	North East Stars	Free
22 June 2012	Kareem Moses	Unattached	North East Stars	Free
22 June 2012	Cleon John	Unattached	North East Stars	Free
22 June 2012	Sheldon Bateau	Unattached	North East Stars	Free
22 June 2012	Elijah Manners	Unattached	North East Stars	Free
