= 2012 Trinidad and Tobago Classic =

2012 TOYOTA Classic
Trinidad and Tobago Classic

Tournament details
- Country: Trinidad and Tobago
- Teams: 16

Final positions
- Champions: North East Stars
- Runners-up: Defence Force

Tournament statistics
- Matches played: 15
- Goals scored: 62 (4.13 per match)
- Top goal scorer: Jerrel Britto (4 goals)

Awards
- Best player: Cleon John

The 2012 Trinidad and Tobago Classic was the eighth season of the TOYOTA Classic, which is a knockout tournament competition for teams in Trinidad and Tobago's TT Pro League and the National Super League. The tournament began on 23 November with 16 teams (8 each from the Pro League and Super League) competing in single elimination matches until the final on 7 December. W Connection entered as the tournament's defending champion having defeated T&TEC with a penalty shootout after the match ended 0–0.

== Qualification ==
Every club from the TT Pro League automatically qualified for the competition. In addition, following the conclusion of the National Super League season, the top eight teams ranked according to the league table qualified. All teams entered the competition at the first round.

The draw for the first round for the eighth edition of the tournament was conducted by Pro League CEO Dexter Skeene on 20 November 2012, at the Hasely Crawford Stadium VIP Lounge. The 16 teams in the competition, valued at TT$70,000 in total sponsorship, were drawn into four groups. Each Pro League club was drawn with a club from the National Super League for the first round of the single-elimination tournament. In addition, the top four clubs in each league's table were drawn as the home team for their first round fixture.

The following clubs have qualified for this year's edition of the TOYOTA Classic:

TT Pro League	National Super League
Caledonia AIA; Defence Force; W Connection; North East Stars; Central FC; St. Ann's Rangers; Police; T&TEC	WASA; Westside Super Starz; Joe Public; Stokely Vale; Siparia Spurs; 1.FC Santa Rosa; 1976 FC Phoenix; Defence Force

== Schedule ==
The schedule for the 2012 TOYOTA Classic, as announced by the TT Pro League and National Super League:

Round	Date	Matches	Clubs	New entries this round
First round	23 November 2012	8	16 → 8	16: 1st–16th
Quarterfinals	27 November 2012	4	8 → 4	
Semifinals	30 November 2012	2	4 → 2	
Final	7 December 2012	1	2 → 1	

== Bracket ==
First round 23 November 2012
A1	North East Stars	2
A4	Siparia Spurs	0
A2	Joe Public	1 (3)
A3	T&TEC	1 (4)
B1	Caledonia AIA	3
B4	1.FC Santa Rosa	2
B2	Stokely Vale	5
B3	Police	0
C1	W Connection	5
C4	Defence Force	0
C2	WASA	2
C3	St. Ann's Rangers	1
D1	Defence Force	4
D4	1976 FC Phoenix	0
D2	Westside Super Starz	1 (4)
D3	Central FC	1 (3)

Quarterfinals; 27 November 2012
A1	North East Stars	6
A3	T&TEC	2
B1	Caledonia AIA	3 (5)
B2	Stokely Vale	3 (6)
C1	W Connection	4
C2	WASA	0
D1	Defence Force	7
D2	Westside Super Starz	0

Semifinals; 30 November 2012
A1	North East Stars	1 (4)
B2	Stokely Vale	1 (1)
C1	W Connection	0
D1	Defence Force	3

Final; 7 December 2012
A1	North East Stars	2 (4)
D1	Defence Force (PL)	2 (2)

== Results ==
All matches were played over two 45 minute halves, and in the process if the match were drawn at the end of regulation time, penalty kicks determined the winner.

=== First round ===
The first round of the competition witnessed three giant-killers from the Super League surprising their Pro League competition after Central FC, Police, and St. Ann's Rangers were booted from the Classic following defeats to Westside Super Starz, Stokely Vale, and WASA respectively. Defending champions W Connection advanced easily into the quarterfinals with a 5–0 win over Defence Force from the Super League. Joevin Jones and Jerrel Britto provided a brace each in support of the Savonetta Boys' win. However, the Soldiers' Pro League counterparts recorded a clean sheet against 1976 FC Phoenix. The Morvant/Laventille Stallions progressed into the quarterfinals following a hard fought 3–2 victory over 1.FC Santa Rosa. In the other first round matches, North East Stars defeated Siparia Spurs 2–0 at Manny Ramjohn Stadium and T&TEC won 4–3 on a penalty shootout over Joe Public after the matched ended 1–1 in regulation.

23 November 2012	North East Stars (1)	2–0	Siparia Spurs (2)	Marabella, Trinidad
18:00 (UTC-4)	Manners 17'; Gabriel 83'	Report		Stadium: Manny Ramjohn Stadium

23 November 2012	Joe Public (2)	1–1 (3–4 p)	T&TEC (1)	Couva, Trinidad
18:00 (UTC-4)	Antoine 30'	Report	Sutton 55'	Stadium: Ato Boldon Stadium

23 November 2012	Caledonia AIA (1)	3–2	1.FC Santa Rosa (2)	Mucurapo, Trinidad
18:00 (UTC-4)	Bobb 27'; Theobald 70' (pen.); Armstrong 87'	Report	Alleyne 61'; Muckette 90'	Stadium: Hasely Crawford Stadium

23 November 2012	Stokely Vale (2)	5–0	Police (1)	Bacolet, Tobago
20:00 (UTC-4)	R. Winchester 19', 75'; Peters 36' (o.g.); Manning 49'; Sebro 55'	Report		Stadium: Dwight Yorke Stadium

23 November 2012	W Connection (1)	5–0	Defence Force (2)	Marabella, Trinidad
20:00 (UTC-4)	Winchester 3'; Jones 26', 89'; Britto 31', 63'	Report		Stadium: Manny Ramjohn Stadium

23 November 2012	WASA (2)	2–1	St. Ann's Rangers (1)	Mucurapo, Trinidad
20:00 (UTC-4)	Smith 76'; Walker 90'	Report	Modeste 40' (pen.)	Stadium: Hasely Crawford Stadium; Referee: Keenan Marcus

23 November 2012	Defence Force (1)	4–0	1976 FC Phoenix (2)	Bacolet, Tobago
18:00 (UTC-4)	Balthazar 3'; Rivers 31'; Jorsling 39', 54'	Report		Stadium: Dwight Yorke Stadium

23 November 2012	Westside Super Starz (2)	1–1 (4–3 p)	Central FC (1)	Couva, Trinidad
20:00 (UTC-4)	Thompson 16'	Report	LoSarah 14'	Stadium: Ato Boldon Stadium

=== Quarterfinals ===
The upset of the tournament occurred on 27 November 2012 in the quarterfinals when defending CFU Club Championship holders Caledonia AIA were eliminated by Stokely Vale. The Super League club won 6–5 in a penalty shootout after the match ended 3–3 after 90 minutes. North East Stars used six goals to prevail over T&TEC in a high scoring affair between the two Pro League sides. The two other quarterfinal matches witnessed a hat-trick from Josimar Belgrave to power Defence Force to a 7–0 win over Westside Super Starz. In addition, W Connection recorded another clean sheet 4–0 over WASA to advance into the semifinals.

27 November 2012	North East Stars (1)	6–2	T&TEC (1)	Marabella, Trinidad
18:00 (UTC-4)	Gabriel 1', 42'; Baptiste 51'; Lewis 68'; Glen 74' (pen.), 84'	Report	Sparks 50'; Garcia 87'	Stadium: Manny Ramjohn Stadium; Referee: Cecil Hinds

27 November 2012	Caledonia AIA (1)	3–3 (5–6 p)	Stokely Vale (2)	Mucurapo, Trinidad
18:00 (UTC-4)	Joseph 48' (pen.); David 85'; Bobb 89'	Report	Thomas 20'; R. Winchester 29'; T. Winchester 50'	Stadium: Hasely Crawford Stadium

27 November 2012	W Connection (1)	4–0	WASA (2)	Marabella, Trinidad
20:00 (UTC-4)	Britto 35', 86'; Arcia 45'; Winchester 90+1'	Report		Stadium: Manny Ramjohn Stadium

27 November 2012	Defence Force (1)	7–0	Westside Super Starz (2)	Mucurapo, Trinidad
20:00 (UTC-4)	Sebro 11', 34'; Belgrave 39', 66', 81'; Russell Jr. 71'; Jorsling 86'	Report		Stadium: Hasely Crawford Stadium

=== Semifinals ===
In the first semifinal match on 30 November 2012, the giant-killers of Stokely Vale were eliminated from the tournament following a 4–1 loss on penalties after a regulation tie 1–1 against North East Stars. The Sangre Grande Boys took the early lead with a goal from Cornell Glen four minutes from half-time and marked his third of the competition in as many games. Stokely Vale fought back in the second half and equalized in the sixtieth minute from Tyrone Manning. The match ended 1–1 after regulation and was decided on penalty kicks. Cleon John saved two penalties in the shootout which allowed North East Stars to cruise in the penalty shootout with successful efforts from Cornell Glen, Elijah Manners, Kerry Baptiste, and Seon Power. Defence Force recorded its third consecutive clean sheet after a 3–0 victory over defending TOYOTA Classic champions W Connection. The Soldiers used a goal from Rodell Elcock in the 30th minute to lead 1–0 at the break. The scoreline lasted well into the second half before Kevon Carter scored fifteen minutes from time to give Defence Force a 2–0 lead late in the match. Jerwyn Balthazar secured the win 3–0 in the 85th minute with a goal from outside the penalty area.

30 November 2012	North East Stars (1)	1–1 (4–1 p)	Stokely Vale (2)	Mucurapo, Trinidad
19:00 (UTC-4)	Glen 41'	Report	Manning 60'	Stadium: Hasely Crawford Stadium
	Penalties
	Glen (penalty scored); Manners (penalty scored); Baptiste (penalty scored); Power (penalty scored)		Manning (penalty scored); Sebro (penalty missed); Charles (penalty missed)

30 November 2012	W Connection (1)	0–3	Defence Force (1)	Mucurapo, Trinidad
21:00 (UTC-4)		Report	Elcock 30'; Carter 75'; Balthazar 85'	Stadium: Hasely Crawford Stadium

=== Final ===
In the final held on 7 December 2012 at the Hasely Crawford Stadium, North East Stars defeated Defence Force 4–2 in a penalty shootout following a 2–2 draw in regulation. The win marked the Sangre Grande Boys' first title in the TOYOTA Classic after having finished runners-up in the 2010 final. North East Stars trailed late in the match 1–2 to the Teteron Boys before a late equalizer from Keryn Navarro in second half stoppage time sent the match into penalties. In the penalty shootout, Stars goalkeeper Cleon John saved a pair of penalty kicks from Rodell Elcock and Aklie Edwards and was later named the most valuable player of the tournament. With four goals in the competition, Jerrel Britto of W Connection was named the tournament's top goalscorer.

7 December 2012	North East Stars (1)	2–2 (4–2 p)	Defence Force (1)	Mucurapo, Trinidad
20:00 (UTC-4)	Wolfe 17'; Navarro 90+3'	Report	Elcock 58', 85'	Stadium: Hasely Crawford Stadium
	Penalties
	Glen (penalty scored); Glasgow (penalty scored); Baptiste (penalty scored); John (penalty scored)		Belgrave (penalty scored); Elcock (penalty missed); Joseph (penalty scored); Edwards (penalty missed)
