= 2010–11 Trinidad and Tobago FA Trophy =

2010–11 FA Trophy
Trinidad and Tobago Cup

Tournament details
- Country: Trinidad and Tobago
- Teams: 32

Final positions
- Champions: San Juan Jabloteh
- Runners-up: North East Stars

Tournament statistics
- Matches played: 31
- Goals scored: 128 (4.13 per match)
- Top goal scorer: Akeil Pierre (5 goals)

The 2010–11 Trinidad and Tobago FA Trophy was the 81st season of the FA Trophy, which is the oldest football competition for teams in Trinidad and Tobago. Joe Public entered as the tournament's defending champion, who defeated W Connection in the 2009 final. The tournament commenced on 17 November 2010, with 32 teams competing in single elimination matches and concluded on 25 January 2011.

== Qualification ==
The tournament featured teams from the top three levels of the football pyramid. These three levels and 8 leagues, namely the TT Pro League, National Super League, Central FA's Premier Division, Eastern FA's Premier Division, Eastern Counties' Football Union, Northern FA's Premier Division, Southern FA's Premier Division, and Tobago FA's Premier Division, each have their own separate qualification process to trim their ranks down to their final team delegations.

The top eight teams following the first round of matches in the 2010–11 season qualified as the Pro League's representatives for the competition. In addition, the top six finishers from the Super League also qualified. In addition, all six regional football associations were awarded three qualification positions into this year's edition.

The following clubs qualified for the 81st edition of the FA Trophy:

TT Pro League; 8 teams	National Super League; 6 teams	Regional FA Leagues; 18 teams	
Caledonia AIA; Defence Force; Joe Public; Ma Pau; North East Stars; San Juan Jabloteh; St. Ann's Rangers; W Connection	Defence Force; East West Super Starz; Joe Public; Real Maracas; St. Francois Nationals; T&TEC	Central FA – Premier Division: Caroni Connection; Couva Sports; Eagles United; Eastern FA – Premier Division: 1.FC Santa Rosa; Malabar; Valtrin United; Eastern Counties – Football Union: Biche United; Damarie Hill Reunited; Valencia United	Northern FA – Premier Division: Defence Force; Petit Valley United; Queen's Park; Southern FA – Premier Division: Diamond United; La Brea All-Stars; PAL United; Tobago FA – Premier Division: Castara Goal City; Mason Hall; St. Clair's Coaching School

== Schedule ==
The schedule for the 2010–11 FA Trophy, as announced by the Trinidad and Tobago Football Association:

Round	Date	Matches	Clubs	New entries this round
First round	17 November 2010	16	32 → 16	32: 1st–32nd
Second round	29 November 2010	8	16 → 8	
Quarterfinals	10 December 2010	4	8 → 4	
Semifinals	12 January 2011	2	4 → 2	
Final	25 January 2011	1	2 → 1	

== Results ==
All matches were played over two 45 minute halves, and in the process if the match were drawn at the end of regulation time, then two additional 15-minute halves were used, and if necessary, penalty kicks if still drawn after extra time.

=== First round ===
The draw for the most prestigious knockout tournament held by the Trinidad and Tobago Football Association was made on 3 November 2010 at its head office in Port of Spain, Trinidad with ties played in the week beginning 17 November 2010. The only Pro League match-up featured Ma Pau facing W Connection. The remaining six professional teams advanced with little difficulty. Castara Goal City from the Tobago FA and Valencia United from the Eastern Counties Football Union defeated National Super League sides T&TEC and St. Francois Nationals respectively.

Tie no	Home team	Score	Away team
1	San Juan Jabloteh	3–0	Valtrin United
2	Joe Public (PL)	2–0	Real Maracas
3	Ma Pau	0–0	W Connection
0–0 after extra time – Ma Pau won 3–2 on penalties
4	East West Super Starz	2–2	North East Stars
North East Stars won 5–2 after extra time
5	Damarie Hill Reunited	3–3	PAL United
3–3 after extra time – Damarie Hill won 4–3 on penalties
6	St. Ann's Rangers	5–0	Malabar
7	Petit Valley United	2–3	La Brea All-Stars
8	Joe Public (SL)	9–0	Defence Force (NFA)

Tie no	Home team	Score	Away team
9	St. Clair School	1–2	Queen's Park
10	Valencia United	3–2	St. Francois Nationals
11	Defence Force (PL)	9–1	Diamond United
12	Defence Force (SL)	3–1	Eagles United
13	Biche United	1–4	Caledonia AIA
14	Caroni Connection	0–1	1.FC Santa Rosa
15	Castara Goal City	2–1	T&TEC
16	Mason Hall	6–0	Couva Sports

=== Second round ===
The draw for the second round took place on 17 November 2010 and involved the 16 winning teams from the first round. These were from the following levels:

- 7 from Level 1 (TT Pro League)
- 2 from Level 2 (National Super League)
- 7 from Level 3 (1 EFA Premier Division, 2 Eastern Counties Football Union, 1 NFA Premier Division, 1 SFA Premier Division, 2 Tobago FA Premier Division)

Matches in the second round were played in the week commencing 29 November 2010. La Brea All-Stars continued their run with a 3–2 win over Queen's Park. In the only match-up between teams from the Pro League, San Juan Jabloteh defeated defending champions Joe Public 2–0 after extra time to secure their place in the quarterfinals. Caledonia AIA received a scare from Defence Force from the National Super League, but prevailed using a 111th-minute goal from Ishmael Daniel in extra time.

Tie no	Home team	Score	Away team
1	St. Ann's Rangers	5–1	Valencia United
2	Castara Goal City	1–3	North East Stars
3	Defence Force (PL)	7–1	Damarie Hill Reunited
4	La Brea All-Stars	1–1	Queen's Park
La Brea All-Stars won 3–2 after extra time
5	Caledonia AIA	1–1	Defence Force (SL)
Caledonia AIA won 2–1 after extra time
6	1.FC Santa Rosa	0–3	Ma Pau
7	Mason Hall	0–2	Joe Public (SL)
8	Joe Public (PL)	0–0	San Juan Jabloteh
San Juan Jabloteh won 2–0 after extra time

=== Quarterfinals ===
The draw for the quarterfinals took place on 4 December 2010 and involved the 8 winning teams from the second round. The lowest ranked team left in the competition was La Brea All-Stars of the Southern FA Premier Division, the third tier of Trinidad and Tobago football. The eight remaining teams were from the following levels:

- 6 from Level 1 (TT Pro League)
- 1 from Level 2 (Joe Public of the National Super League)
- 1 from Level 3 (La Brea All-Stars of the Southern FA Premier Division)

Matches in the quarterfinals were played on 10 December 2010. The two remaining minnows were ousted at the quarterfinals stage, leaving the semifinals to be an all-professional affair. La Brea All-Stars of the SFA Premier Division were defeated by San Juan Jabloteh 5–0 in the late match at Ato Boldon Stadium. The other potential giant-killer Joe Public from the National Super League were also eliminated from the competition following a loss to professional side Caledonia AIA 5–4 on penalties after the match ended 2–2 in regulation. In the remaining all-Pro League matches, North East Stars defeated Ma Pau 1–0 and Defence Force (PL) beat St. Ann's Rangers by a 3–1 scoreline.

10 December 2010	Joe Public (2)	2–2 (4–5 p)	Caledonia AIA (1)	Macoya, Trinidad
17:00 (UTC-4)	Charles 56', 90'	Report	Beveney 6'; Bennett 43'	Stadium: Marvin Lee Stadium; Referee: Rashby McPhie

10 December 2010	Ma Pau (1)	0–1	North East Stars (1)	Couva, Trinidad
17:00 (UTC-4)		Report	Wolfe 25'	Stadium: Ato Boldon Stadium

10 December 2010	Defence Force (1)	3–1	St. Ann's Rangers (1)	Macoya, Trinidad
19:00 (UTC-4)	Jorsling 83', 97'; Williams 111'	Report	Modeste 15'	Stadium: Marvin Lee Stadium

10 December 2010	San Juan Jabloteh (1)	5–0	La Brea All-Stars (3)	Couva, Trinidad
19:00 (UTC-4)	Plaza 12'; Oliver 26'; Glen 69'; Guerra 80'; Manners 90'	Report		Stadium: Ato Boldon Stadium

=== Semifinals ===
The draw for the semifinals took place on 11 December 2010. The four remaining teams were all consisted of Pro League (1) teams including Caledonia AIA, Defence Force, North East Stars, and San Juan Jabloteh. Both semifinal matches took place at Marvin Lee Stadium on 12 January 2011. North East Stars defeated Defence Force (PL) 2–0 to reach the final of the competition. Both goals came from Guyanese Charles Pollard, who scored in the 24th and in first half stoppage time. In the other semifinal, San Juan Jabloteh needed eight penalty kicks to defeat Caledonia AIA by a score of 7–6 following a 2–2 scoreline after regulation time.

12 January 2011	Caledonia AIA (1)	2–2 (6–7 p)	San Juan Jabloteh (1)	Macoya, Trinidad
17:00 (UTC-4)	Stewart 64', 88'	Report	Marcano 42'; Sam 59'	Stadium: Marvin Lee Stadium
	Penalties
	Joseph (penalty scored); Moore (penalty scored); Rochford (penalty scored); Cyrus (penalty missed); David (penalty scored); Stewart (penalty scored); Theobald (penalty scored); Daniel (penalty missed)		Manners (penalty scored); Marcano (penalty missed); Hinkson (penalty scored); Guerra (penalty scored); Oliver (penalty scored); Thomas (penalty scored); Peltier (penalty scored); Bateau (penalty scored)

12 January 2011	Defence Force (1)	0–2	North East Stars (1)	Macoya, Trinidad
19:00 (UTC-4)		Report	Pollard 24', 45+1'	Stadium: Marvin Lee Stadium

=== Final ===
The final was played at Marvin Lee Stadium in Macoya, Trinidad on 29 January 2011. The match was contested by North East Stars, who defeated Defence Force (PL) 2–0 in their semifinal, and San Juan Jabloteh who needed penalties to defeat Caledonia AIA after the match ended 2–2 after the end of regulation. San Juan Jabloteh secured the Trophy following an early goal from Kennedy Hinkson in the 2nd minute and superb goalkeeping from Cleon John to defeat the North East Stars 1–0. The win marked the San Juan Boys' third FA Trophy win, whereas the Sangre Grande Boys settled for their second runner-up in the competition. The leading goal scorer of the tournament was Akeil Pierre of Defence Force (PL) having scored a hat-trick in his side's first round match against Diamond United and a further brace against Damarie Hill Reunited in the second round.

29 January 2011	North East Stars (1)	0–1	San Juan Jabloteh (1)	Macoya, Trinidad
19:00 (UTC-4)		Report	Hinkson 2'	Stadium: Marvin Lee Stadium
