= 2008 Trinidad and Tobago FA Trophy =

2008 FA Trophy
Trinidad and Tobago Cup

Tournament details
- Country: Trinidad and Tobago
- Teams: 32

Final positions
- Champions: Caledonia AIA
- Runners-up: W Connection

Tournament statistics
- Matches played: 31
- Goals scored: 132 (4.26 per match)
- Top goal scorer: Atiba McKnight (6 goals)

The 2008 Trinidad and Tobago FA Trophy was the 79th season of the FA Trophy, which is the oldest football competition for teams in Trinidad and Tobago. The tournament took place at the conclusion of the 2008 season. Joe Public entered as the tournament's defending champion. The tournament began on 3 December, with 32 teams competing in single elimination matches.

== Qualification ==
The tournament featured teams from the top three levels of the football pyramid. These three levels and 8 leagues, namely the TT Pro League, National Super League, Central FA's Premier Division, Eastern FA's Premier Division, Eastern Counties' Football Union, Northern FA's Premier Division, Southern FA's Premier Division, and Tobago FA's Premier Division, each have their own separate qualification process to trim their ranks down to their final team delegations.

The top eight finishers in the Pro League for the 2008 season all qualified for the competition. In addition, the top eight finishers from the Super League also qualified. However, only three clubs from 4 of the 6 regional football associations were awarded qualification into this year's edition, with the Eastern Counties and Northern FA as the exceptions as they only received two.

The following clubs qualified for the 79th edition of the FA Trophy:

TT Pro League; 8 teams	National Super League; 8 teams	Regional FA Leagues; 16 teams	
Caledonia AIA; Defence Force; Joe Public; North East Stars; San Juan Jabloteh; St. Ann's Rangers; United Petrotrin; W Connection	Defence Force; Harlem Strikers; Harvard; 1976 FC Phoenix; St. Ann's Rangers; Trinidad and Tobago Air Guard/Coast Guard; Trinidad and Tobago U20; WASA	Central FA – Premier Division: A to Z United; Harlem Strikers; Strugglers; Eastern FA – Premier Division: Atomic Youth; Joe Public; Malick Togetherness; Eastern Counties – Football Union: Biche United; Valencia United	Northern FA – Premier Division: Dathea Copious Suns; Queen's Park; Southern FA – Premier Division: La Brea All-Stars; Siparia Spurs; T&TEC; Tobago FA – Premier Division: Charlotteville Unifiers; Hills United; Roxborough Lakers

== Schedule ==
The schedule for the 2008 FA Trophy, as announced by the Trinidad and Tobago Football Association:

Round	Date	Matches	Clubs	New entries this round
First round	3 December 2008	16	32 → 16	32: 1st–32nd
Second round	7 December 2008	8	16 → 8	
Quarterfinals	10 December 2008	4	8 → 4	
Semifinals	15 December 2008	2	4 → 2	
Final	17 December 2008	1	2 → 1	

== Results ==
All matches were played over two 45 minute halves, and in the process if the match were drawn at the end of regulation time, then two additional 15-minute halves were used, and if necessary, penalty kicks if still drawn after extra time.

=== First round ===
The draw for the most prestigious knockout tournament held by the Trinidad and Tobago Football Association was made on 24 November 2008 at its head office in Port of Spain, Trinidad with ties played on 3 December 2008. The only Pro League match-up featured United Petrotrin against North East Stars. All Pro League clubs advanced easily into the second round with a combined scoreline of 28–2. With the withdrawal of Trinidad and Tobago U20, Charlotteville Unifiers was the lone survivor facing competition from a higher division.

Tie no	Home team	Score	Away team
1	W Connection	5–1	A to Z United
2	T&TEC	1–1	Roxborough Lakers
1–1 after extra time – T&TEC won 4–3 on penalties
3	Malick Togetherness	2–1	Valencia United
4	Charlotteville Unifiers	w/o	Trinidad and Tobago U20
Awarded to Charlotteville, T&T U20 withdrew after draw
5	Joe Public (EFA)	0–2	Caledonia AIA
6	Harvard	2–0	Biche United
7	Harlem Strikers (NFA)	0–7	San Juan Jabloteh
8	Siparia Spurs	1–2	Dathea Copious Suns

Tie no	Home team	Score	Away team
9	St. Ann's Rangers (PL)	5–0	Hills United
10	St. Ann's Rangers (SL)	w/o	La Brea All-Stars
Awarded to St. Ann's Rangers (SL), La Brea withdrew after draw
11	Queen's Park	3–0	Strugglers
12	Atomic Youth Movement	1–3	Joe Public (PL)
13	United Petrotrin	0–1	North East Stars
14	WASA	2–1	Defence Force (SL)
15	1976 FC Phoenix	w/o	Harlem Strikers (SL)
Awarded to 1976 FC Phoenix, Strikers withdrew after draw
16	Defence Force (PL)	6–0	T&T AG/CG

=== Second round ===
The draw for the second round took place on 4 December 2008 and involved the 16 winning teams from the first round. These were from the following levels:

- 7 from Level 1 (TT Pro League)
- 4 from Level 2 (National Super League)
- 5 from Level 3 (1 EFA Premier Division, 2 NFA Premier Division, 1 SFA Premier Division, 1 Tobago FA Premier Division)

Matches in the second round were played on 7 December 2008. 1976 FC Phoenix and WASA provided the Trophy's first two upsets over Pro League clubs by putting out Joe Public and North East Stars, respectively. Another surprise from the round was that Dathea Copious Suns defeated T&TEC to be the lone representative from the third level of the pyramid in the quarterfinals.

Tie no	Home team	Score	Away team
1	St. Ann's Rangers (SL)	0–5	St. Ann's Rangers (PL)
2	Defence Force (PL)	6–1	Queen's Park
3	1976 FC Phoenix	2–2	Joe Public (PL)
2–2 after extra time – 1976 FC Phoenix won 4–2 on penalties
4	Charlotteville Unifiers	0–7	San Juan Jabloteh
5	Caledonia AIA	9–0	Harvard
6	Malick Togetherness	0–6	W Connection
7	WASA	3–3	North East Stars
3–3 after extra time – WASA won 5–4 on penalties
8	T&TEC	1–2	Dathea Copious Suns

=== Quarterfinals ===
The draw for the quarterfinals took place on 8 December 2008 and involved the 8 winning teams from the second round. These were from the following levels:

- 5 from Level 1 (TT Pro League)
- 2 from Level 2 (National Super League)
- 1 from Level 3 (Dathea Copious Suns of the Northern FA Premier Division)

Matches in the quarterfinals were played on 10 December 2008. WASA remained the only club from outside the TT Pro League to advance to the semifinals after defeating Dathea Copious Suns. Caledonia AIA needed extra time to defeat St. Ann's Rangers (PL), Defence Force stunned San Juan Jabloteh 2–1, and W Connection put out giant-killers 1976 FC Phoenix to advance to the semifinals.

10 December 2008	San Juan Jabloteh (1)	1–2	Defence Force (1)	Marabella, Trinidad
17:00 (UTC-4)	Peltier 4'	Report	Carter 18', 59'	Stadium: Manny Ramjohn Stadium

10 December 2008	W Connection (1)	3–0	1976 FC Phoenix (2)	Macoya, Trinidad
17:00 (UTC-4)	Santos 44'; Isaac 82', 85'	Report		Stadium: Marvin Lee Stadium

10 December 2008	Caledonia AIA (1)	4–1	St. Ann's Rangers (1)	Marabella, Trinidad
19:00 (UTC-4)	Armstrong 68'; Joseph 95'; Theobald 106'; Moore 116'	Report	McFarlane 60'	Stadium: Manny Ramjohn Stadium

10 December 2008	WASA (2)	5–2	Dathea Copious Suns (3)	Macoya, Trinidad
19:00 (UTC-4)	Faure 4', 43', 64'; Brooks 57'; Stoute 90'	Report	Gillard 52', 67'	Stadium: Marvin Lee Stadium

=== Semifinals ===
The draw for the semifinals took place on 11 December 2008. It consisted of Caledonia AIA, Defence Force, and W Connection from the Pro League (1) and WASA from the National Super League (2). The semifinal matches took place at Marvin Lee Stadium on 15 December 2008.

W Connection made quick work of Super League side WASA to end their run in the competition by putting up eight goals. Caledonia AIA defeated Defence Force 4–2 to make it back-to-back final appearances.

15 December 2008	W Connection (1)	8–1	WASA (2)	Macoya, Trinidad
17:00 (UTC-4)	Santos 2'; McKnight 5', 64', 86'; Isaac 15', 74'; Smith 46'; Leon 88'	Report	Brooks 66'	Stadium: Marvin Lee Stadium

15 December 2008	Defence Force (1)	2–4	Caledonia AIA (1)	Macoya, Trinidad
19:00 (UTC-4)	Jorsling 7', 13'	Report	Velox 10', 53', 75'; Moore 65'	Stadium: Marvin Lee Stadium

=== Final ===
The final was played at Marvin Lee Stadium in Macoya, Trinidad on 17 December 2008. The match was contested by Caledonia AIA, who beat Defence Force 4–2 in their semifinal, and W Connection who beat WASA 8–1. Caledonia AIA used a goal late from Conrad Smith to level the match at two each in the 82nd minute. After the match ended 2–2 in regulation, Caledonia AIA used the momentum and produced a goal from Jameel Perry in the 108th minute to give Caledonia AIA their first FA Trophy title. Atiba McKnight claimed the title of the Trophy's leading goal scorer with six goals for W Connection on their way to the final.

17 December 2008	Caledonia AIA (1)	3–2	W Connection (1)	Macoya, Trinidad
19:00 (UTC-4)	Moore 34'; Smith 82'; Perry 108'	Report	Smith 29'; McKnight 37'	Stadium: Marvin Lee Stadium
