= 2009 Trinidad and Tobago Classic =

2009 TOYOTA Classic
Trinidad and Tobago Classic

Tournament details
- Country: Trinidad and Tobago
- Teams: 16

Final positions
- Champions: Joe Public
- Runners-up: San Juan Jabloteh

Tournament statistics
- Matches played: 15
- Goals scored: 46 (3.07 per match)
- Top goal scorer(s): Marvin Oliver; Noel Williams (4 goals)

The 2009 Trinidad and Tobago Classic was the fifth season of the TOYOTA Classic, which is a knockout tournament competition for teams in the TT Pro League and the National Super League. The tournament took place at the conclusion of the 2009 season. San Juan Jabloteh entered as the tournament's defending champion. The tournament commenced on 30 October, with 16 teams competing in single elimination matches.

== Qualification ==
Every club from the TT Pro League automatically qualified for the competition except for Tobago United who did not enter. In addition, following the conclusion of the National Super League season, the top six teams ranked according to the league table qualified. All teams entered the competition at the first round.

The draw for the first round for the fifth edition of the tournament was conducted by Pro League CEO Dexter Skeene on 28 October 2009, at the TOYOTA Trinidad and Tobago Limited Barataria showroom. The 16 teams in the competition, valued at TT$50,000 in total sponsorship, were drawn into four groups. All clubs were seeded based on their positions in their respective leagues.

St. Ann's Rangers, San Juan Jabloteh, Defence Force, and Joe Public were drawn as the top seeds in Groups A, B, C, and D, respectively.

The following clubs have qualified for this year's edition of the TOYOTA Classic:

TT Pro League	National Super League
Joe Public; San Juan Jabloteh; Caledonia AIA; W Connection; Ma Pau; Defence Force; United Petrotrin; FC South End; St. Ann's Rangers; Police	Joe Public; T&TEC; Harvard; 1976 FC Phoenix; Defence Force; Economy Strikers

== Schedule ==
The schedule for the 2009 TOYOTA Classic, as announced by the TT Pro League and National Super League:

Round	Date	Matches	Clubs	New entries this round
First round	30 October 2009	8	16 → 8	16: 1st–16th
Quarterfinals	3 November 2009	4	8 → 4	
Semifinals	6 November 2009	2	4 → 2	
Final	13 November 2009	1	2 → 1	

== Bracket ==
First round 30 October 2009
A1	St. Ann's Rangers	3
A4	FC South End	2
B2	1976 FC Phoenix	1 (4)
B3	Harvard	1 (3)
B1	San Juan Jabloteh	5
B4	Defence Force	0
A2	United Petrotrin	2
A3	Economy Strikers	1
C1	Defence Force	3
C4	T&TEC	0
D2	Joe Public	4
D3	Police	1
D1	Joe Public	1
D4	Ma Pau	2
C2	W Connection	1 (3)
C3	Caledonia AIA	1 (0)

Quarterfinals; 3 November 2009
A1	St. Ann's Rangers	2 (8)
B2	1976 FC Phoenix	2 (7)
B1	San Juan Jabloteh	0 (3)
A2	United Petrotrin	0 (2)
C1	Defence Force	1
D2	Joe Public	2
D4	Ma Pau	1
C2	W Connection	0

Semifinals; 6 November 2009
A1	St. Ann's Rangers	3
B1	San Juan Jabloteh	4
D2	Joe Public	1 (3)
D4	Ma Pau	1 (2)

Final; 13 November 2009
B1	San Juan Jabloteh	0
D2	Joe Public	4

== Results ==
All matches were played over two 45 minutes halves, and in the process if the match were drawn at the end of regulation time, penalty kicks determined the winner.

=== First round ===
On the competition's opening night, W Connection dumped Caledonia AIA out of the tournament with a 3–0 victory on penalty kicks after each team scored a goal in regulation. There were no other surprises as Joe Public easily defeated Police, Ma Pau claimed a 2–1 victory over Joe Public (SL), and St. Ann's Rangers used a late Jahvon Morris goal to advance past fellow Pro League side FC South End. On the following day, Defence Force defeated T&TEC by a score 3–0, whereas San Juan Jabloteh mauled Defence Force (SL) 5–0 to advance to the quarterfinals.

30 October 2009	St. Ann's Rangers (1)	3–2	FC South End (1)	Malabar, Trinidad
18:00 (UTC-4)	Musgrave 23', 55'; Morris 88'	Report	Etienne 34', 37'	Stadium: Larry Gomes Stadium

1 November 2009	1976 FC Phoenix (2)	1–1 (4–3 p)	Harvard (2)	Malabar, Trinidad
18:00 (UTC-4)	Noray 2'	Report	Freitas 20'	Stadium: Larry Gomes Stadium

31 October 2009	San Juan Jabloteh (1)	5–0	Defence Force (2)	Malabar, Trinidad
18:00 (UTC-4)	Williams 16', 67' (pen.); Oliver 58', 72'; Mulraine 79'	Report		Stadium: Larry Gomes Stadium; Referee: Neal Brizan

30 October 2009	United Petrotrin (1)	2–1	Economy Strikers (2)	Marabella, Trinidad
18:00 (UTC-4)	Lima 32'; Dwarika 85'	Report	Hughes 90+2'	Stadium: Manny Ramjohn Stadium

31 October 2009	Defence Force (1)	3–0	T&TEC (2)	Malabar, Trinidad
20:00 (UTC-4)	Narcis 18'; Balthazar 25'; Carter 33'	Report		Stadium: Larry Gomes Stadium

30 October 2009	Joe Public (1)	4–1	Police (1)	Macoya, Trinidad
18:00 (UTC-4)	Noel 20'; McKnight 24'; Highley 82', 86'	Report	Marshall 90'	Stadium: Marvin Lee Stadium

30 October 2009	Joe Public (2)	1–2	Ma Pau (1)	Macoya, Trinidad
20:00 (UTC-4)	Derrick 45'	Report	Samuel 35', 60'	Stadium: Marvin Lee Stadium

30 October 2009	W Connection (1)	1–1 (3–0 p)	Caledonia AIA (1)	Marabella, Trinidad
20:00 (UTC-4)	Oliveira 80'	Report	Joseph 29' (o.g.)	Stadium: Manny Ramjohn Stadium
	Penalties
	Seabra (penalty scored); Pereira (penalty scored); Cupid (penalty scored)		Muhammed (penalty missed); Daniel (penalty missed); Stewart (penalty missed)

=== Quarterfinals ===
San Juan Jabloteh survived a scoreless match after regulation to defeat Petrotrin on penalties 3–2 and advanced to the semifinals. Likewise, St. Ann's Rangers needed eight penalty kicks to defeat the lone National Super League team left in the tournament, 1976 FC Phoenix. Ma Pau and Joe Public continued their run to the semifinals with wins over Pro League sides W Connection and Defence Force respectively.

4 November 2009	St. Ann's Rangers (1)	2–2 (8–7 p)	1976 FC Phoenix (2)	Couva, Trinidad
17:00 (UTC-4)	Belgrave 45+1' (pen.); Thomas 61'	Report	Grimshaw 21'; Williams 88'	Stadium: Ato Boldon Stadium; Referee: Shane de Silva
	Penalties
	Belgrave (penalty scored); Narine (penalty scored); Thomas (penalty scored); Modeste (penalty scored); Bristol (penalty scored); Thomas (penalty scored); Belgrave (penalty scored); Williams (penalty scored)		Keith (penalty scored); Williams (penalty scored); Roberts (penalty scored); Grimshaw (penalty scored); Delpeche (penalty scored); Mitchell (penalty scored); Nedd (penalty scored); Williams (penalty missed)

3 November 2009	San Juan Jabloteh (1)	0–0 (3–2 p)	United Petrotrin (1)	Marabella, Trinidad
18:00 (UTC-4)		Report		Stadium: Manny Ramjohn Stadium; Referee: Mike Mohammed
	Penalties
	Guerra (penalty scored); Johnson (penalty scored); Glen (penalty scored); Williams (penalty missed)		Campbell (penalty missed); Lima (penalty scored); Pierre (penalty scored); Hislop (penalty missed); Glasgow (penalty missed)

3 November 2009	Defence Force (1)	1–2	Joe Public (1)	Macoya, Trinidad
18:00 (UTC-4)	Balthazar 4'		Smith 86', 90+3'	Stadium: Marvin Lee Stadium

3 November 2009	Ma Pau (1)	1–0	W Connection (1)	Marabella, Trinidad
20:00 (UTC-4)	Caesar 53'			Stadium: Manny Ramjohn Stadium

=== Semifinals ===
Jabloteh held off St. Ann's Rangers 4–3 following two late goals from Rangers to advance to the final on 13 November. In the other semifinal match, Joe Public edged Ma Pau on penalties to meet Jabloteh in the final.

6 November 2009	St. Ann's Rangers (1)	3–4	San Juan Jabloteh (1)	Macoya, Trinidad
18:00 (UTC-4)	Modeste 15'; Musgrave 90+2'; Belgrave 90+4'	Report	Williams 1', 52'; Oliver 8', 45+1'	Stadium: Marvin Lee Stadium

6 November 2009	Joe Public (1)	1–1 (3–2 p)	Ma Pau (1)	Macoya, Trinidad
20:00 (UTC-4)	Noel 83'	Report	Andrews 76'	Stadium: Marvin Lee Stadium
	Penalties
	Noel (penalty scored); Mitchell (penalty missed); Hoshide (penalty missed); Smith (penalty scored); Rochford (penalty scored)		Wolfe (penalty scored); Gonzales (penalty missed); Freitas (penalty missed); Samuel (penalty scored); Noray (penalty missed)

=== Final ===
Joe Public claimed the title on 13 November with a 4–0 mauling of Jabloteh at Marvin Lee Stadium. Although Jabloteh lost in the final, teammates Marvin Oliver and Noel Williams walked away as the tournament's top goal scorers with four goals each.

13 November 2009	San Juan Jabloteh (1)	0–4	Joe Public (1)	Macoya, Trinidad
20:00 (UTC-4)			Mitchell 14'; Baptiste 24', 29'; Tinto 65'	Stadium: Marvin Lee Stadium
