= 2011–12 Trinidad and Tobago FA Trophy =

2011–12 FA Trophy
Trinidad and Tobago Cup

Tournament details
- Country: Trinidad and Tobago
- Teams: 36

Final positions
- Champions: Caledonia AIA
- Runners-up: Defence Force

Tournament statistics
- Matches played: 35
- Goals scored: 118 (3.37 per match)
- Top goal scorer(s): Michael Edwards; Andrew London (5 goals each)

The 2011–12 Trinidad and Tobago FA Trophy was the 82nd season of the FA Trophy, which is the oldest football competition for teams in Trinidad and Tobago. San Juan Jabloteh entered as the tournament's defending champion, who defeated North East Stars 1–0 in the 2010–11 final at Marvin Lee Stadium. The number of entrants in the tournament was expanded by the Trinidad and Tobago Football Association to allow four teams from the Secondary Schools Football League to compete in the competition against semi-professional and professional football clubs. The tournament began on 29 January 2012 with 36 teams competing in single elimination matches and concluded on 25 March 2012.

== Qualification ==
The tournament featured teams from the top three levels of the football pyramid. These three levels and 9 leagues, namely the TT Pro League, National Super League, Central FA's Premier Division, Eastern FA's Premier Division, Eastern Counties' Football Union, Northern FA's Premier Division, Southern FA's Premier Division, Tobago FA's Premier Division, and the Secondary School Football League each have their own separate qualification process to trim their ranks down to their final team delegations.

All eight teams from the TT Pro League entered the competition. The top six following the 2011 National Super League season also met qualification. In addition, the six regional football associations were awarded three qualification positions. For the first time in the competition, four teams qualified from the Secondary Schools Football League.

The following clubs qualified for the 82nd edition of the FA Trophy:

TT Pro League; 8 teams	National Super League; 6 teams	Regional FA Leagues; 18 teams		Secondary School Football League; 4 teams
Caledonia AIA; Defence Force; North East Stars; Police; San Juan Jabloteh; St. Ann's Rangers; T&TEC; W Connection	Club Sando; Joe Public; St. Francois Nationals; Stokely Vale; 1976 FC Phoenix; WASA	Central FA – Premier Division: Caroni Samba; Harlem Strikers; KC Perseverance; Eastern FA – Premier Division: 1.FC Santa Rosa; Maloney FC; WASA; Eastern Counties – Football Union: Damarie Hill Reunited; Guaya United; Mafeking United	Northern FA – Premier Division: Clint Marcelle Coaching School; Dathea Copious Suns; Queen's Park; Southern FA – Premier Division: OJ's Soldado All-Stars; T&TEC; Uprising Youths; Tobago FA – Premier Division: St. Clair's Coaching School; 1976 FC Phoenix; Youth Stars	Carapichaima East Secondary; El Dorado East Secondary; Scarborough Secondary; St. Anthony's College

== Schedule ==
The schedule for the 2011–12 FA Trophy, as announced by the Trinidad and Tobago Football Association:

Round	Date	Matches	Clubs	New entries this round
First round	29 January 2012	4	36 → 32	8: 29th–36th
Second round	5 February 2012	16	32 → 16	28: 1st–28th
Third round	26 February 2012	8	16 → 8	
Quarterfinals	11 March 2012	4	8 → 4	
Semifinals	18 March 2012	2	4 → 2	
Final	25 March 2012	1	2 → 1	

== Results ==
All matches were played over two 45 minute halves, and in the process if the match were drawn at the end of regulation time, then two additional 15-minute halves were used, and if necessary, penalty kicks if still drawn after extra time.

=== First round ===
The draw for the most prestigious knockout tournament held by the Trinidad and Tobago Football Association was made on 20 January 2012 at its head office in Port of Spain, Trinidad with ties played in the week beginning 23 January 2012. As a result of the random draw, two TT Pro League clubs were drawn into the first round of the competition with Caledonia AIA facing Uprising Youths and Defence Force squaring off with St. Anthony's College. However, both clubs progressed into the second round with the Morvant/Laventille Stallions recording a 4–1 victory and the Teteron Boys narrowly defeating the Secondary Schools Football League team 3–2.

Tie no	Home team	Score	Away team
1	St. Anthony's College	2 – 3	Defence Force
2	Caledonia AIA	4 – 1	Uprising Youths
3	WASA (SL)	3 – 1	Maloney FC
4	Club Sando	6 – 0	Damarie Hill Reunited

=== Second round ===
The draw for the second round took place on 31 January 2012 and involved the four winning teams from the first round and the remaining 28 teams that received byes into the second round. These were from the following levels:

- 8 from Level 1 (TT Pro League)
- 6 from Level 2 (National Super League)
- 15 from Level 3 (Regional Football Association Leagues)
- 3 from the Secondary Schools Football League

Matches in the second round were played in the week commencing 5 February 2012. The TT Pro League clubs progressed into the third round draw with relative ease. Michael Edwards of Defence Force recorded five goals in a rout over Makeking United 11–0. In addition, San Juan Jabloteh defeated El Dorado East with a 5–0 win following a hat-trick from Willis Plaza, W Connection dominated KC Perseverance by a score of 7–0, and North East Stars claimed victory over Dalthea Copious Suns 5–1. Police and St. Ann's Rangers later became the fifth and sixth Pro League teams to advance with wins over Youth Stars and WASA respectively. Caledonia AIA later joined their fellow professional clubs with a narrow 1–0 victory over 1.FC Santa Rosa. However, T&TEC became the first Pro League to fall to a giant-killer after the Electricity Boys tasted defeat 1–0 to St. Francois Nationals of the National Super League.

Tie no	Home team	Score	Away team
1	Caroni Samba	w/o	Stokely Vale
Awarded to Caroni Samba, Stokely Vale withdrew after draw
2	Scarborough	3–1	1976 FC Phoenix (TFA)
3	1976 FC Phoenix (SL)	w/o	Club Sando
Awarded to Club Sando, Unfit ground at Tobago Phoenix
4	Guaya United	1–1	Harlem Strikers
1–1 after extra time – Harlem Strikers won 4–3 on penalties
5	Joe Public	2–1	St. Clair Coaching School
6	Carapichaima East	0–4	OJ's Soldado All-Stars
7	T&TEC (SFA)	0–1	Clint Marcelle School
8	St. Francois Nationals	1–0	T&TEC (PL)

Tie no	Home team	Score	Away team
9	Mafeking United	0–11	Defence Force
10	El Dorado East	0–5	San Juan Jabloteh
11	North East Stars	5–1	Dathea Copious Suns
12	W Connection	7–0	KC Perseverance
13	Police	1–0	Youth Stars
14	Queen's Park	1–4	WASA (SL)
15	WASA (EFA)	1–3	St. Ann's Rangers
16	Caledonia AIA	1–0	1.FC Santa Rosa

=== Third round ===
The draw for the third round took place on 9 February 2012 and involved the 16 winning teams from the second round. These were from the following levels:

- 7 from Level 1 (TT Pro League)
- 4 from Level 2 (National Super League)
- 4 from Level 3 (2 CFA Premier Division, 1 NFA Premier Division, 1 SFA Premier Division)
- 1 from the Secondary Schools Football League (Scarborough Secondary)

Matches in the third round were played in the week commencing 26 February 2012. Following the draw, three matches featured all-Pro League encounters with Defence Force advancing with a narrow 3–2 win over Police, Caledonia AIA upending North East Stars 4–3 on penalties after the match ended 1–1 in regulation, and W Connection eliminating the defending champions San Juan Jabloteh 1–0 with a goal from Shahdon Winchester. However, St. Ann's Rangers would not advance to the quarterfinals following a 3–1 defeat to Joe Public from the National Super League. Scarborough Secondary, the lone Secondary Schools Football League team remaining in the competition, continued their deep run with a 3–1 penalty shootout victory after the match ended in a 0–0 draw with Caroni Samba to advance into the quarterfinals.

Tie no	Home team	Score	Away team
1	Caledonia AIA	1–1	North East Stars
1–1 after extra time – Caledonia AIA won 4–3 on penalties
2	Harlem Strikers	0–2	OJ's Saldado All-Stars
3	W Connection	1–0	San Juan Jabloteh
4	Club Sando	1–2	WASA (SL)
5	Scarborough	0–0	Caroni Samba
0–0 after extra time – Scarborough won 3–1 on penalties
6	Police	2–3	Defence Force
7	Clint Marcelle School	1–2	St. Francois Nationals
8	Joe Public	3–1	St. Ann's Rangers

=== Quarterfinals ===
The draw for the quarterfinals took place on 6 March 2012 and involved the 8 winning teams from the third round. The lowest ranked teams left in the competition were OJ's Soldado All-Stars of the Southern FA Premier Division, the third tier of Trinidad and Tobago football, and Scarborough Secondary of the Secondary Schools Football League. The eight remaining teams were from the following levels:

- 3 from Level 1 (TT Pro League)
- 3 from Level 2 (National Super League)
- 1 from Level 3 (OJ's Soldado All-Stars of the Southern FA Premier Division)
- 1 from the Secondary Schools Football League (Scarborough Secondary)

Matches in the quarterfinals were played on 11 March 2012. Caledonia AIA used goals from Devorn Jorsling and Ataullah Guerra to defeat Joe Public 2–0 and advance to the semifinal round. In addition, W Connection ended the cinderella run of Scarborough Secondary following a dominant 5–0 win with Hashim Arcia recording a hat-trick. Defence Force also easily advanced to the semifinals with a 5–0 triumph over St. Francois Nationals. In the only match involving teams outside the top flight, WASA from the National Super League defeated OJ's Soldado All-Stars 3–1.

11 March 2012	Caledonia AIA (1)	2–0	Joe Public (2)	Mucurapo, Trinidad
17:00 (UTC-4)	Jorsling 34'; Guerra 73'	Report		Stadium: Hasely Crawford Stadium

11 March 2012	Defence Force (1)	5–0	St. Francois Nationals (2)	Marabella, Trinidad
17:00 (UTC-4)	Sebro 18'; Belgrave 27', 45'; Neptune 65'; Russell Jr. 77'	Report		Stadium: Manny Ramjohn Stadium

11 March 2012	WASA (2)	3–1	OJ's Soldado All-Stars (3)	Saint Joseph, Trinidad
17:00 (UTC-4)	Garcia 37', 43'; Calderon 74'	Report	Smart 70'	Stadium: WASA Ground

11 March 2012	W Connection (1)	5–0	Scarborough Secondary	Couva, Trinidad
17:00 (UTC-4)	Arcia 33', 50', 55'; Britto 40', 85'	Report		Stadium: Ato Boldon Stadium

=== Semifinals ===
The draw for the semifinals took place on 14 March 2012. The four remaining teams consisted of three clubs from the Pro League (1) which included Caledonia AIA, Defence Force, and W Connection. The other remaining team was WASA of the National Super League (2). Both semifinal matches took place at Manny Ramjohn Stadium on 18 March 2012.

On 18 March 2012 at the Manny Ramjohn Stadium, W Connection lost to Caledonia AIA 1–0 with a goal from Ataullah Guerra in the 35th minute to propel the Morvant/Laventille Stallions into the final. In the other semifinal match, Defence Force used first-half goals from Josimar Belgrave and Sean Narcis to defeat WASA 3–2.

18 March 2012	Defence Force (1)	3–2	WASA (2)	Marabella, Trinidad
16:00 (UTC-4)	Belgrave 17'; Narcis 38'; Sebro 56'	Report	Celestine 50', 58'	Stadium: Manny Ramjohn Stadium

18 March 2012	W Connection (1)	0–1	Caledonia AIA (1)	Marabella, Trinidad
18:15 (UTC-4)		Report	Guerra 35'	Stadium: Manny Ramjohn Stadium

=== Final ===
The final was played at Manny Ramjohn Stadium in Marabella, Trinidad on 25 March 2012. The match was decided between Caledonia AIA, who defeated W Connection 1–0 in the second semifinal match, and Defence Force who ended the giant-killing of WASA from the National Super League by a score of 3–2 in the other semifinal. Caledonia AIA raised the Trophy for the second time in their club's history (2008) after former soldier and striker Devorn Jorsling scored for the Morvant/Laventille Stallions against his former club, Defence Force, in the 81st minute to secure a hard fought 1–0 victory. The leading goal scorer of the tournament was jointly held by Michael Edwards of Defence Force and Andrew London of Club Sando. Edwards recorded five goals in a second round win over Mafeking United, whereas Andrew London scored four goals in the first round and followed with another goal in the third round.

25 March 2012	Caledonia AIA (1)	1–0	Defence Force (1)	Marabella, Trinidad
17:00 (UTC-4)	Jorsling 81'	Report		Stadium: Manny Ramjohn Stadium
