= 2008 Trinidad and Tobago Classic =

2008 TOYOTA Classic
Trinidad and Tobago Classic

Tournament details
- Country: Trinidad and Tobago
- Teams: 16

Final positions
- Champions: San Juan Jabloteh
- Runners-up: St. Ann's Rangers

Tournament statistics
- Matches played: 16
- Goals scored: 56 (3.5 per match)
- Top goal scorer: Conrad Smith (4 goals)

The 2008 Trinidad and Tobago Classic was the fourth season of the TOYOTA Classic, which is a knockout tournament competition for teams in the TT Pro League and the National Super League. The tournament took place at the conclusion of the 2008 season. Joe Public entered as the tournament's defending champion.

== Qualification ==
Every club from the TT Pro League automatically qualified for the competition. In addition, following the conclusion of the National Super League season, the top five teams ranked according to the league table qualified. All teams entered the competition at the first round.

The draw for the first round for the fourth edition of the tournament was conducted by Pro League CEO Dexter Skeene on 26 November 2008, at the Constantine Stand, Queen's Park Oval. The 16 teams in the competition, valued at TT$150,000 in total sponsorship, were drawn into four groups, all named after TOYOTA branded vehicles, Terios (Group A), Sirion (Group B), Delta (Group C), and Daihatsu (Group D). All clubs were seeded based on their positions in their respective leagues.

W Connection, Caledonia AIA, San Juan Jabloteh, and Joe Public of the TT Pro League were drawn as the top seeds in Groups A, B, C, and D, respectively.

The following clubs have qualified for this year's edition of the TOYOTA Classic:

TT Pro League	National Super League
San Juan Jabloteh; W Connection; North East Stars; Caledonia AIA; Joe Public; United Petrotrin; St. Ann's Rangers; Defence Force; Ma Pau; Tobago United	Trinidad and Tobago U20; Joe Public; WASA; 1976 FC Phoenix; Carenage United; Economy Strikers

== Schedule ==
The schedule for the 2008 TOYOTA Classic, as announced by the TT Pro League and National Super League:

Round	Date	Matches	Clubs	New entries this round
First round	1 December 2008	8	16 → 8	16: 1st–16th
Quarterfinals	5 December 2008	4	8 → 4	
Semifinals	12 December 2008	2	4 → 2	
Third place	19 December 2008	1	2 → 1	
Final	19 December 2008	1	2 → 1	

== Bracket ==
First round 1 December 2008
A1	W Connection	4
A4	Economy Strikers	3
A2	North East Stars	0 (4)
A3	Joe Public	0 (2)
D1	Joe Public	4
D4	Carenage United	0
D2	St. Ann's Rangers	3
D3	Trinidad and Tobago U20	2
B1	Caledonia AIA	4
B4	WASA	3
B2	United Petrotrin	2
B3	Ma Pau	0
C1	San Juan Jabloteh	4
C4	1976 FC Phoenix	0
C2	Defence Force	1
C3	Tobago United	2

Quarterfinals; 5 December 2008
A1	W Connection	1
A2	North East Stars	2
D1	Joe Public	1
D2	St. Ann's Rangers	2
B1	Caledonia AIA	2
B2	United Petrotrin	0
C1	San Juan Jabloteh	5
C3	Tobago United	0

Semifinals; 12 December 2008
A2	North East Stars	0
D2	St. Ann's Rangers	1
B1	Caledonia AIA	1
C1	San Juan Jabloteh	2

Final; 19 December 2008
D2	St. Ann's Rangers	1
C1	San Juan Jabloteh	2
Third place
A2	North East Stars	2 (5)
B1	Caledonia AIA	2 (6)

== Results ==
All matches were played over two 45 minutes halves, and in the process if the match were drawn at the end of regulation time, penalty kicks determined the winner.

=== First round ===
The tournament commenced on 1 December, with all 16 teams competing in single elimination matches. Despite having the chance to upset a club from the Pro League, each Super League team lost in the first round. Tobago United provided the only upset of the round, when the Tobago Boys topped Defence Force in Group C. All other higher-seeded teams advanced to the quarterfinals with little difficulty.

1 December 2008	W Connection (1)	4–3	Economy Strikers (2)	Couva, Trinidad
17:00 (UTC-4)	Isaac 5', 46'; Velasco-Torijano 56'; Daniel 58'		Charles 20' (pen.), 83' (pen.); Jones 32'	Stadium: Ato Boldon Stadium

1 December 2008	Joe Public (2)	0–0 (2–4 p)	North East Stars (1)	Macoya, Trinidad
17:00 (UTC-4)				Stadium: Marvin Lee Stadium
	Penalties
	Noreiga (penalty scored); Mulraine (penalty missed); Lewis (penalty missed); Waldron (penalty scored)		Cooper (penalty scored); Gonzales (penalty scored); Fitzpatrick (penalty scored); Leslie (penalty scored)

1 December 2008	Joe Public (1)	4–0	Carenage United (2)	Macoya, Trinidad
19:00 (UTC-4)	Richardson 22', 68'; Mitchell 35'; Baptiste 61'			Stadium: Marvin Lee Stadium

1 December 2008	St. Ann's Rangers (1)	3–2	Trinidad and Tobago U20 (2)	Mucurapo, Trinidad
19:00 (UTC-4)	Edwards 6'; McFarlane 21'; Peters 75'		Bateau 3'; Gay 17'	Stadium: Hasely Crawford Stadium

1 December 2008	Caledonia AIA (1)	4–3	WASA (2)	Malabar, Trinidad
19:00 (UTC-4)	Armstrong 5'; Smith 24', 64'; Joseph 70'		Thompson 18'; Dickenson 55'; Bailey 65'	Stadium: Larry Gomes Stadium

1 December 2008	United Petrotrin (1)	2–0	Ma Pau (1)	Couva, Trinidad
19:00 (UTC-4)	Williams 11'; Frederick 38'			Stadium: Ato Boldon Stadium

1 December 2008	San Juan Jabloteh (1)	4–0	1976 FC Phoenix (2)	Mucurapo, Trinidad
17:00 (UTC-4)	Joseph 16'; Manners 32' (pen.)			Stadium: Hasely Crawford Stadium

1 December 2008	Defence Force (1)	1–2	Tobago United (1)	Malabar, Trinidad
17:00 (UTC-4)	Jorsling 37' (pen.)		McKinnon 45'; Hercules 87'	Stadium: Larry Gomes Stadium

=== Quarterfinals ===
In the quarterfinals, top-seeded clubs W Connection and Joe Public were ousted from the competition following defeats to North East Stars and St. Ann's Rangers, respectively. On the other side of the bracket, San Juan Jabloteh and Caledonia AIA both advanced easily as both Pro League sides did not concede a goal during the round.

5 December 2008	W Connection (1)	1–2	North East Stars (1)	Marabella, Trinidad
20:00 (UTC-4)	Santos 65'		Stewart 27'; Sancho 39'	Stadium: Manny Ramjohn Stadium

5 December 2008	Joe Public (1)	1–2	St. Ann's Rangers (1)	Malabar, Trinidad
19:00 (UTC-4)	Richardson 45'		Modeste 49'; James 52'	Stadium: Larry Gomes Stadium

5 December 2008	Caledonia AIA (1)	2–0	United Petrotrin (1)	Marabella, Trinidad
18:00 (UTC-4)	Theobald 51'; Joseph 80'			Stadium: Manny Ramjohn Stadium

5 December 2008	San Juan Jabloteh (1)	5–0	Tobago United (1)	Malabar, Trinidad
17:00 (UTC-4)	Plaza 22'; Forbes 30', 43', 50'; Marcano 88'			Stadium: Larry Gomes Stadium

=== Semifinals ===
One week after the quarterfinals, on 12 December, St. Ann's Rangers continued their run through the tournament with a 1–0 win over fellow Pro League side North East Stars. San Juan Jabloteh also advanced to the final with a victory against Caledonia AIA.

12 December 2008	North East Stars (1)	0–1	St. Ann's Rangers (1)	Macoya, Trinidad
18:00 (UTC-4)			Navarro 90' (o.g.)	Stadium: Marvin Lee Stadium; Referee: Nigel Roberts

12 December 2008	Caledonia AIA (1)	1–2	San Juan Jabloteh (1)	Marabella, Trinidad
20:00 (UTC-4)	Smith 90'		Glen 24'; Manners 59'	Stadium: Manny Ramjohn Stadium

=== Third place ===
In the consolation match-up, Caledonia AIA narrowly defeated North East Stars 6–5 on penalty kicks, after the match ended 2–2 in regulation, to claim the competition's third place.

19 December 2008	North East Stars (1)	2–2 (5–6 p)	Caledonia AIA (1)	Mucurapo, Trinidad
18:00 (UTC-4)	Wolfe 71'; Cudjoe 90'		Smith 31'; Joseph 45' (pen.)	Stadium: Hasely Crawford Stadium; Referee: Rashby McPhie
	Penalties
	Jerome (penalty scored); González (penalty scored); Fitzpatrick (penalty scored); Wolfe (penalty scored); Leslie (penalty missed); Cudjoe (penalty scored); Stewart (penalty missed)		Joseph (penalty scored); David (penalty missed); Bentick (penalty scored); Moore (penalty scored); Theobald (penalty scored); Phillips (penalty scored); Jones (penalty scored)

=== Final ===
In the final, San Juan Jabloteh claimed their first TOYOTA Classic title with a 2–1 win over St. Ann's Rangers using goals from Jason Marcano and Trent Noel. Conrad Smith used a brace in Caledonia AIA's victory in the first round to eventually end as the tournament's leading goal scorer with four goals.

19 December 2008	St. Ann's Rangers (1)	1–2	San Juan Jabloteh (1)	Mucurapo, Trinidad
20:00 (UTC-4)	Peters 67'		Noel 49'; Marcano 56'	Stadium: Hasely Crawford Stadium; Referee: Russell Casimar
