= Rundell Winchester =

Trinidadian footballer

Personal information
- Full name: Rundell Renold Winchester
- Date of birth: 16 December 1993 (age 32)
- Place of birth: Plymouth, Trinidad and Tobago
- Height: 6 ft 2 in (1.88 m)
- Position: Forward

Team information
- Current team: Adhyaksa Bekasi
- Number: 9

Youth career
- 2005–2010: Goodwood High School

Senior career*
Years	Team	Apps	(Gls)
2011–2012	Stokely Vale	8	(9)
2012–2014	Central	18	(9)
2014	Visé	4	(3)
2014–2016	Central	34	(19)
2015–2016	→ Portland Timbers 2 (loan)	22	(3)
2016	PS Kemi	6	(0)
2016	AC Kajaani	5	(4)
2017	Central		(1)
2017–2018	Ma Pau Stars		(10)
2018–2019	Platense	42	(12)
2019–2020	Gudja United	19	(5)
2020–2021	Hibernians	11	(2)
2021	Marsaxlokk	5	(2)
2021–2023	Żabbar St. Patrick		
2023–2024	Al-Rayyan		
2024	Tarxien Rainbows	10	(6)
2024–2025	Lija Athletic	17	(5)
2025–2026	Khaleej Sirte	9	(0)
2026–	Adhyaksa Bekasi	2	(0)

International career^{‡}
2013–	Trinidad and Tobago	6	(0)
- * Club domestic league appearances and goals as of 22:00, 18 September 2026 (UTC) ‡ National team caps and goals as of 27 March 2023 (UTC)

Rundell Renold Winchester (born 16 December 1993) is a Trinidadian professional footballer who plays as a forward for Championship club Adhyaksa Bekasi.

Winchester began his football career in 2011, at the age of 17, with semi-professional club Stokely Vale in his native Trinidad and Tobago. After two seasons in the National Super League and an impressive series of performances in the 2012 Classic and FA Trophy competitions, he made a transfer to Central of the TT Pro League in December 2012. Winchester later moved to Visé of the Belgian Third Division prior to the 2014–15 season.

In international football, Winchester made his Trinidad and Tobago debut in October 2013, at the age of 19.

== Club career ==
=== Early career ===
Winchester began his football career in 2011, at the age of 17, for semi-professional club Stokely Vale on the sister-isle of Tobago. In his first season, Winchester was positioned as a winger and scored one league goal. However, his best performances occurred during the TOYOTA Classic in November 2011 where he scored two goals in as many matches to lead his club to the quarterfinals. Winchester started the following season for Stokely Vale as a striker and immediately scored two goals in his first three matches. However, Rundell did not score again until 5 August 2012 when he recorded the lone goal in a win over Joe Public. In October, Winchester rediscovered his goal-scoring form after recording goals in three consecutive league matches, respectively, against Siparia Spurs, 1.FC Santa Rosa, and Club Sando. He scored a further brace in his next match to bring his league total to eight goals.

In November 2012, Winchester gained notoriety around the TT Pro League after scoring three goals to eliminate both Police and Caledonia AIA in consecutive rounds during the TOYOTA Classic. In December, he continued his giant-killing in the FA Trophy after leading Stokely Vale to the quarterfinals with victories over Pro League clubs St. Ann's Rangers and Defence Force; having scored a goal in each match. In his two seasons with Stokely Vale, Winchester recorded nine league goals and 16 goals in all competitions.

=== Central FC ===
On 20 December 2012, one day after leading Stokely Vale to a win over TT Pro League leaders Defence Force, Winchester completed a move to Central FC on a free transfer. The following night, he scored a 57th-minute goal in his professional debut for the Sharks in a loss to Caledonia AIA. However, after the arrival of Antiguan Peter Byers the next month, playing time was sparse for the remainder of the season. However, in a rare start on 6 May 2013, he provided a brace in a win over Caledonia AIA. Winchester finished his first season with Central FC with a goal in the semifinals of the Digicel Pro Bowl against North East Stars.

Prior to the 2013–14 season, Central FC and Walsall of Football League One agreed to a partnership that featured the Saddlers' in a pre-season tour of Trinidad and Tobago. As part of their agreement, Winchester was one of five one-week trialists at Walsall during its training sessions and exhibition matches against his previous club Stokely Vale and a Pro League XI. On 13 September 2013, Rundell opened the Pro League season with a goal in a 3–1 win over Pro League defending champions Defence Force. His strong start to the season was ultimately rewarded with a call-up to the national team. In October 2013, Winchester was named the most valuable player of the First Citizens Cup after scoring the winning goal to give Central FC its first major trophy in a 2–1 win over Defence Force in the final. Four days later, he recorded his first career hat-trick as a professional on 22 October against Point Fortin Civic. After his successful month, Winchester was named Pro League Player of the Month for October. Winchester concluded his second season with Central FC by leading the Sharks to the 2014 Goal Shield over rivals W Connection and winning his second most valuable player award of the season. Following the season, Winchester signed a two-year contract extension, keeping him with Central FC until the end of the 2015–16 season.

On 17 July 2014, Winchester traveled to Visé to discuss personal terms with Belgian club C.S. Visé. Prior to departing for Belgium, Winchester recorded nine goals in the TT Pro League and 18 goals in all competitions in his two years with Central.

=== Cercle Sportif Visé ===
On 22 July 2014, Winchester agreed to join C.S. Visé of the Belgian Third Division on a free transfer from Central FC and was reunited with former manager Terry Fenwick and teammate Willis Plaza.

=== PS Kemi ===
On 12 May 2016, Winchester signed a deal with PS Kemi that would see him awarded a one-year contract, with the option of another year, upon the completion of a successful trial. PS Kemi chose not to activate the permanent contract upon the completion of the trial period.

=== Marsaxlokk ===
Winchester signed for Maltese First Division side Marsaxlokk on 8 January 2021.

=== Al-Rayyan ===
On 31 May 2023, Winchester joined Saudi Second Division side Al-Rayyan.

== International career ==
Winchester has represented Trinidad and Tobago on the senior level of international competition, having been capped for the Trinidad and Tobago national team.

The young man has some qualities[...] Some things went wrong for him, but he never hid. He wanted the ball, he took people on, he got the penalty and for me that is the making of a player for the future.

— Stephen Hart on the 19-year-old Winchester after a friendly against Jamaica on 19 November 2013.

Winchester made his full international debut for the Trinidad and Tobago national team, on 15 October 2013, at the age of 19, in a match against New Zealand after coming on as a second-half substitute for captain Kenwyne Jones. The following month, Winchester was selected in the squad for a pair of matches against Caribbean rivals Jamaica. On 15 November, he made his first start for the Soca Warriors in a 1–0 win in Montego Bay. In the return match in Port of Spain, Winchester came on as a substitute for Lester Peltier and helped draw a penalty kick that led to the team's second goal.

On 4 June 2014, Winchester made a late substitute appearance in a 3–0 loss during a send-off series match for Argentina at Estadio Monumental prior to the 2014 FIFA World Cup.

== Career statistics ==
=== International ===
As of 27 March 2023

National team	Year	Friendly		Competitive		Total	
National team	Year	Apps	Goals	Apps	Goals	Apps	Goals
Trinidad and Tobago	2013	3	0	0	0	3	0
Trinidad and Tobago	2014	1	0	0	0	1	0
Trinidad and Tobago	2023	0	0	2	0	2	0
Total		4	0	2	0	6	0
