= Elton John (footballer) =

Trinidad Tobago footballer (born 1987)

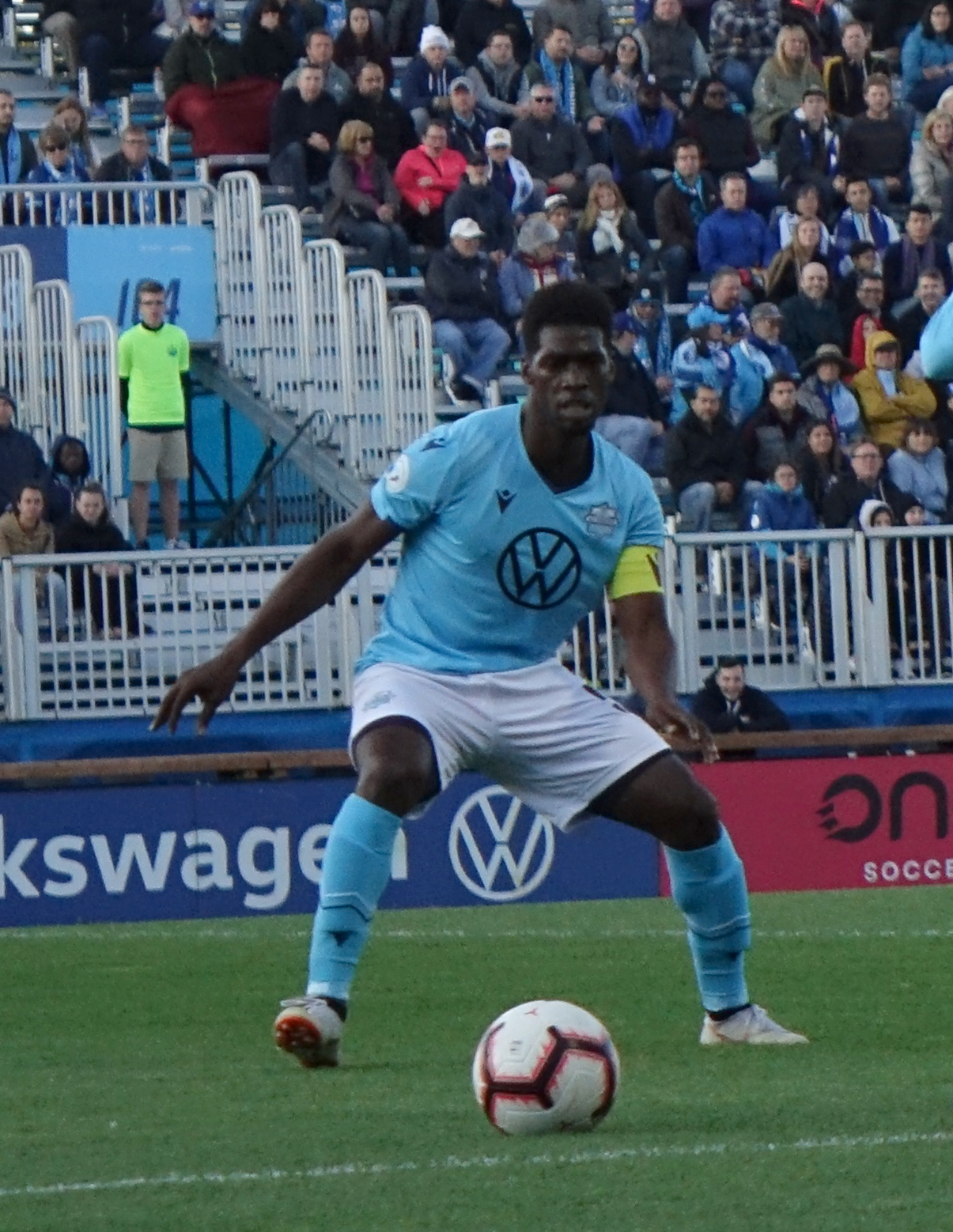
- John with HFX Wanderers in 2019

Personal information
- Full name: Elton David Wallace John
- Date of birth: 8 April 1987 (age 39)
- Place of birth: Arima, Trinidad and Tobago
- Height: 1.75 m (5 ft 9 in)
- Positions: Midfielder; defender

Senior career*
| Years | Team | Apps | (Gls) |
| 2007–2009 | San Juan Jabloteh | | (2) |
| 2010–2011 | Ma Pau | | (0) |
| 2011–2012 | San Juan Jabloteh | | (1) |
| 2012–2013 | North East Stars | | (0) |
| 2013–2014 | Central FC | | (0) |
| 2014 | Visé | 7 | (1) |
| 2015–2016 | Central FC | | (0) |
| 2016–2017 | Ma Pau Stars | | (2) |
| 2017 | North East Stars | | (3) |
| 2018 | Queen's Park | 8 | (3) |
| 2018 | San Juan Jabloteh | | |
| 2019 | HFX Wanderers | 18 | (0) |

International career^{‡}
| 2012 | Trinidad and Tobago | 1 | (0) |
- * Club domestic league appearances and goals as of 19 October 2019 ‡ National team caps and goals as of 12 January 2019

Elton David Wallace John (born 8 April 1987) is a Trinidadian professional footballer who plays as a midfielder.

== Club career ==
=== San Juan Jabloteh ===
John began his professional football career with San Juan Jabloteh.

John won his first two TT Pro League titles in back-to-back seasons with Jabloteh in 2007 and 2008. He also helped the club win the 2008 Trinidad and Tobago Classic.

The following season, John played every minute in all four games for Jabloteh in the 2009 CFU Club Championship and scored two goals, helping the club earn third place and qualify for the 2009–10 CONCACAF Champions League.

John again played every minute of every match for Jabloteh in Champions League play that year. He helped the club win its preliminary round play-off against Panamanian side San Francisco and then played the first four matches of the group stage against Marathón, Toluca and twice against FC Dallas before his contract with Jabloteh expired at the end of the 2009 season.

=== Ma Pau ===
On 4 January 2010, John signed with Ma Pau ahead of the 2010–11 season.

=== Second spell at Jabloteh ===
In 2011, John rejoined Jabloteh for the 2011–12 season.

=== North East Stars ===
In the 2012–13 season, John played for North East Stars and helped the club win the 2012 Trinidad and Tobago Classic.

=== Central FC ===
On 3 September 2013, John signed with Central FC.

In October 2013 he played in the final of the Trinidad and Tobago League Cup, a 2–1 win for Central FC over Defence Force and the club's first League Cup title. In April 2014 he helped Central win the 2014 Trinidad and Tobago Goal Shield. At the end of the 2013–14 season he was voted Central FC's Supporters' Player of the Year.

=== Visé ===
In August 2014, John transferred to Belgian Third Division club Visé for an undisclosed fee.

=== Second spell at Central FC ===
John left Visé in Fall 2014 and returned to Central FC, helping the club win its first TT Pro League title. In May 2015, he scored a penalty in a shoot-out in the semi-finals of the 2015 CFU Club Championship against Haitian side Don Bosco, helping Central earn a spot in the final. Central went on to win the final against Trinidadian rivals W Connection, earning John his first international title.

In August 2015, John's transfer to Visé became part of a scandal involving Central FC founders Brent Sancho and Kevin Harrison. Leaked emails revealed that Harrison had allegedly requested that a portion of the fees for the transfers of John and other Central FC players be wired directly to himself and Sancho as a "personal payment." A Visé official later claimed that this request was rebuffed. Sancho left the club in February 2015 when he was appointed Trinidad and Tobago's Minister for Sport and subsequently appointed Harrison as his advisor. In September 2015, after Harrison appeared in the Central FC dressing room to congratulate the players for their victory in the 2015 Charity Shield, John and 23 other Central FC players signed a petition addressed to the club's management to voice their displeasure with Harrison's continued presence at the club in light of the transfer fee scandal and the pair's alleged pocketing of players' performance bonuses after the 2014–15 season.

John made his return to the Champions League that season, playing every minute of all four of Central FC's matches in the group stage against LA Galaxy and Comunicaciones. Central failed to qualify for the knockout round, but finished second in the group after earning a win against Comunicaciones and a draw against LA Galaxy at home despite losing both away matches.

In addition to the Charity Shield title, John helped Central FC win the TT Pro League and the CFU Club Championship, both for the second year in a row.

On 17 August 2016, John played 90 minutes for Central FC against Sporting Kansas City in the Champions League group stage.

=== Second spell at Ma Pau ===
In the 2016–17 season, John played for Ma Pau Stars.

=== Second spell at NE Stars ===
In 2017, John won his fifth TT Pro League title with North East Stars.

=== Queen's Park ===
In 2018, John played for TT Super League side Queen's Park, scoring three goals in eight appearances.

=== Third spell at Jabloteh ===
In August 2018, John returned for a third spell with San Juan Jabloteh and was named captain of his first club.

=== HFX Wanderers ===
John signed with Canadian Premier League club HFX Wanderers on 10 January 2019. On 14 December 2019, the club announced that John would not be returning for the 2020 season.

== International career ==
John made his Trinidad and Tobago debut on 29 February 2012, in a 4–0 win against Antigua and Barbuda.

== Personal life ==
John was born in Arima on Trinidad. He was raised by his grandmother, as his father was absent and his mother moved away when he was young.

He is a cousin of former Trinidad and Tobago international footballer Jason Marcano, with whom he played at Central FC.

In May 2018, John and seven other Trinidadian professional footballers created the Can Bou Play Foundation, an outreach program which provides mentorship and football education opportunities to youth in Trinidad and Tobago.

== Honours ==
San Juan Jabloteh

- TT Pro League: 2007, 2008
- Trinidad and Tobago Classic: 2008

North East Stars

- TT Pro League: 2017
- Trinidad and Tobago Classic: 2012

Central FC

- TT Pro League: 2014–15, 2015–16
- CFU Club Championship: 2015, 2016
- Trinidad and Tobago League Cup: 2013
- Trinidad and Tobago Goal Shield: 2014
- Trinidad and Tobago Charity Shield: 2015

Individual

- Central FC Supporters' Player of the Year: 2013–14
