= Neil Benjamin =

Trinidad and Tobago footballer

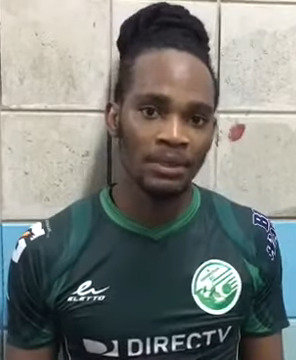
- Benjamin at an interview as W Connection player in 2017

Personal information
- Full name: Neil Tevin Michael Benjamin Jr.
- Date of birth: 20 August 1994 (age 32)
- Place of birth: Couva, Trinidad and Tobago
- Height: 1.71 m (5 ft 7 in)
- Positions: Winger; forward

Team information
- Current team: Nam Định F.C

Youth career
- 2001–2010: W Connection
- 2010: Naparima College

Senior career*
Years	Team	Apps	(Gls)
2011–2018	W Connection	28	(5)
2018	Nam Định F.C	7	(1)

International career^{‡}
2010–2011	Trinidad and Tobago U17	6	(0)
2012	Trinidad and Tobago U20	3	(0)
2017–2019	Trinidad and Tobago	3	(0)
- * Club domestic league appearances and goals as of 23 May 2014 ‡ National team caps and goals as of 11 August 2019

Neil Tevin Michael Benjamin Jr. (born 20 August 1994) is a Trinidadian professional footballer who plays as a winger for TT Pro League club W Connection.

Benjamin began his professional football career in 2011, at the age of 17, with W Connection in his native Trinidad and Tobago. During his time with the Savonetta Boys, Benjamin has won the TT Pro League title twice and the FA Trophy in 2013–14.

== Early life ==
Benjamin was born in Couva, Trinidad and Tobago, to parents Neil Sr. and Charlene. In primary school, Neil discovered at an early age that he had a talent for his speed on the track. However, his focus would soon transition to football and credits his father and uncles, Glen and St. Nicholas, for his passion for the sport. At the age of 7, Benjamin enrolled in the youth program at TT Pro League club W Connection – based in his hometown of Couva.

Benjamin attended Naparima College in San Fernando, Trinidad and led the team to the Secondary Schools Football League (SSFL) South Zone title in 2010. He later scored the lone goal in a 3–1 loss to St. Augustine Secondary, which witnessed Naps eliminated from the national Intercol Big Five competition. In 2011, Benjamin was the joint-leading goal scorer with 10 goals in the under-17 reserve league while playing for W Connection and was named the most valuable player in the under-18 reserve league the following season.

== Club career ==
=== W Connection ===
After several seasons in the club's youth program, Benjamin was promoted to the first-team in 2011, at the age of 17, with W Connection of the TT Pro League. Prior to his professional football debut with the Savonetta Boys, Benjamin and former Naparima College teammate Shahdon Winchester received a ten-day trial with FC Dallas of Major League Soccer in June 2011. Upon his return to Trinidad and Tobago, Neil featured in five league matches and took part in the club's fourth Pro League championship. Following the season, Benjamin helped W Connection finish runners-up in the 2012 CFU Club Championship and earn a place in the 2012–13 CONCACAF Champions League.

In September 2012, Benjamin traveled to Italy for a trial with Serie A club Genoa. During his first week, he drew serious interest from Genoa after impressing the club with his speed and had his stay extended. However, the trial proved unsuccessful and Neil was ultimately released to rejoin W Connection in November. Afterwards, Benjamin went on to enjoy an active second season with the Savonetta Boys after scoring four league goals and five in all competitions, including his first career hat-trick as a professional in a 4–0 win over eventual Pro League champions Defence Force on 6 May 2013.

Neil opened the 2013–14 season as a regular substitute for W Connection playing primarily as a right-wing forward. During the 2013–14 CONCACAF Champions League, Benjamin made appearances in each of the Savonetta Boys' four group stage matches. On 8 August 2013, he came on for Mekeil Williams in the 62nd minute and later scored W Connection's lone goal of the competition in a 3–1 loss to Árabe Unido. Two weeks later, Benjamin started in a scoreless draw at home against the Houston Dynamo of Major League Soccer. During the match, Neil had two late match-winning opportunities with one "horrific" open net miss and another shot hitting the crossbar. Benjamin later had an impressive series of performances in the TOYOTA Classic and FA Trophy competitions. On 18 December, he was named the most valuable player of the FA Trophy final after scoring the tying goal to send the match into a penalty shootout and lead the Savonetta Boys to the club's first FA Trophy crown in 11 years. Afterwards, Benjamin experienced a dip in form with his lone league goal scored on 10 January 2014 in a narrow 2–1 win over Police. He concluded his third season with W Connection with a string of substitute appearances to help lead the club to its fifth Pro League title and second in three years.

== International career ==
Benjamin has represented Trinidad and Tobago on various levels of international competition, having been capped for the under-17 and under-20 national teams.

=== Youth teams ===
He began his international career for the under-17 team during qualification for the 2011 CONCACAF U-17 Championship, where he made two starts in the midfield for the Soca Warriors against Cuba and Saint Kitts and Nevis. He made a further second-half substitute appearance in the team's final group match against Bermuda to help Trinidad and Tobago top their qualification group. In February 2011, during the continental competition, Benjamin started in consecutive matches against Jamaica and Guatemala. However, in the quarterfinals, the Young Warriors were eliminated from the competition following a 2–0 defeat to Canada.

In August 2012, Benjamin made consecutive starts as a defender for the under-20 team during their first round of qualification for the 2013 CONCACAF U-20 Championship. However, he was forced to miss the Soca Warriors' win against Saint Vincent and the Grenadines after receiving two yellow cards in each of the previous two matches. In November 2012, under-20 team managers Hutson Charles and Ross Russell complained to Benjamin's parent club W Connection concerning the timing of the player's trial with Serie A club Genoa and subsequent decline in form on international duty. As a result, Benjamin was left out of the squad for the team's final round of qualification.

== Career statistics ==
=== Club ===
As of 23 May 2014

Club	Season	League			Cup		League Cup (Note: Includes appearances in the Trinidad and Tobago's Classic, Goal Shield, and Pro Bowl)		Continental (Note: Includes appearances in the CONCACAF Champions League)		Other (Note: Includes appearances in the Trinidad and Tobago Charity Shield and CFU Club Championship)		Total	
Club	Season	Division	Apps	Goals	Apps	Goals	Apps	Goals	Apps	Goals	Apps	Goals	Apps	Goals
W Connection	2011–12	TT Pro League	5	0	0	0	2	0	0	0	3	0	10	0
W Connection	2012–13	TT Pro League	9	4	0	0	5	1	0	0	1	0	15	5
W Connection	2013–14	TT Pro League	14	1	3	2	12	1	4	1	1	0	34	5
W Connection	Total		28	5	3	2	19	2	4	1	5	0	59	10
Career total			28	5	3	2	19	2	4	1	5	0	59	10
