= Kevon Neaves =

Trinidadian soccer midfielder (born 1985)

Personal information
- Full name: Kevon Declan Neaves
- Date of birth: October 24, 1985 (age 41)
- Place of birth: Mount Hope, Trinidad and Tobago
- Height: 6 ft 0 in (1.83 m)
- Position: Midfielder

Youth career
- 2002–2005: St. Anthony's College

College career
Years	Team	Apps	(Gls)
2005–2008	South Florida Bulls	69	(13)

Senior career*
Years	Team	Apps	(Gls)
2005	Ajax Orlando Prospects	12	(1)
2008–2010	Köping FF	8	(6)
2010–2013	T&TEC	21	(21)
2013–2014	Westside Superstarz	0	(0)
2014–2017	Club Sando	3	(0)

International career^{‡}
2006–2012	Trinidad and Tobago	2	(0)
- * Club domestic league appearances and goals as of 22 November 2020 ‡ National team caps and goals as of 9 November 2014

Kevon Declan Neaves (born October 24, 1985) was a Trinidadian soccer midfielder who last played for Club Sando in the National Super League.

== Career ==
=== Early career ===
Born in Mount Hope, Neaves was raised in Petit Valley, Trinidad and Tobago. He went on to play for St. Anthony's College, where he helped the team win three Intercollegiate Championships and was named the 2005 Trinidad High School Player of the Year. He then relocated to the United States playing in the USL Premier Development League for the Ajax Orlando Prospects. He made 12 appearances while scoring once for the farm team of Dutch club Ajax Amsterdam before playing Division I College soccer for the South Florida Bulls until 2008.

=== Köping FF ===
In 2008 Neaves relocated to Sweden, signing with Division 2 team Köping FF. He played two season with the club before returning to Trinidad and Tobago.

=== T&TEC ===
In 2010, Neaves joined the T&TEC Sports Club playing in the National Super League, the 2nd tier of professional football in Trinidad. After his debut season, Neaves was named as one of the top “Five Players of the Year” as the “Electricity Boys”, as T&TEC FC were called, finished at the top of the standings, qualifying for the TT Pro League in the process, the top flight of football in Trinidad and Tobago.

The following season saw T&TEC finish in second place to W Connection, finishing as runners-up in both the First Citizens Cup as well as the Toyota Classic before relegating back to the National Super League two seasons later.

=== Westside Superstarz ===
In 2013, he signed with Westside Superstarz F.C. playing in the National Super League once more.

=== Club Sando ===
In 2014, he signed with Club Sando remaining in the same league.

== International career ==
Having progressed through the youth ranks of the Soca Warriors, Neaves made his debut for the Trinidad and Tobago first team under manager Leo Beenhakker in a 2–0 victory against Iceland on 28 February 2006. He made his second appearance on 29 February 2012 against Antigua and Barbuda in a 4–0 away win.

== Career statistics ==
=== International ===
Statistics accurate as of match played 29 February 2012.

Trinidad and Tobago senior team
Year	Apps	Goals
2006	1	0
2012	1	0
Total	2	0

== Honours ==
T&TEC

- National Super League: 2010
- First Citizens Cup runner-up: 2011
- Toyota Classic runner-up: 2011

Individual

- National Super League Topscorer: 2010
