= FA Trophy (disambiguation) =

The FA Trophy is the main annual knockout cup competition in English non-League football.

FA Trophy may also refer to:

- Maltese FA Trophy, Malta's main men's football cup competition
- Trinidad and Tobago FA Trophy, Trinidad and Tobago's main men's football cup competition
