= Mekeil Williams =

Trinidadian footballer

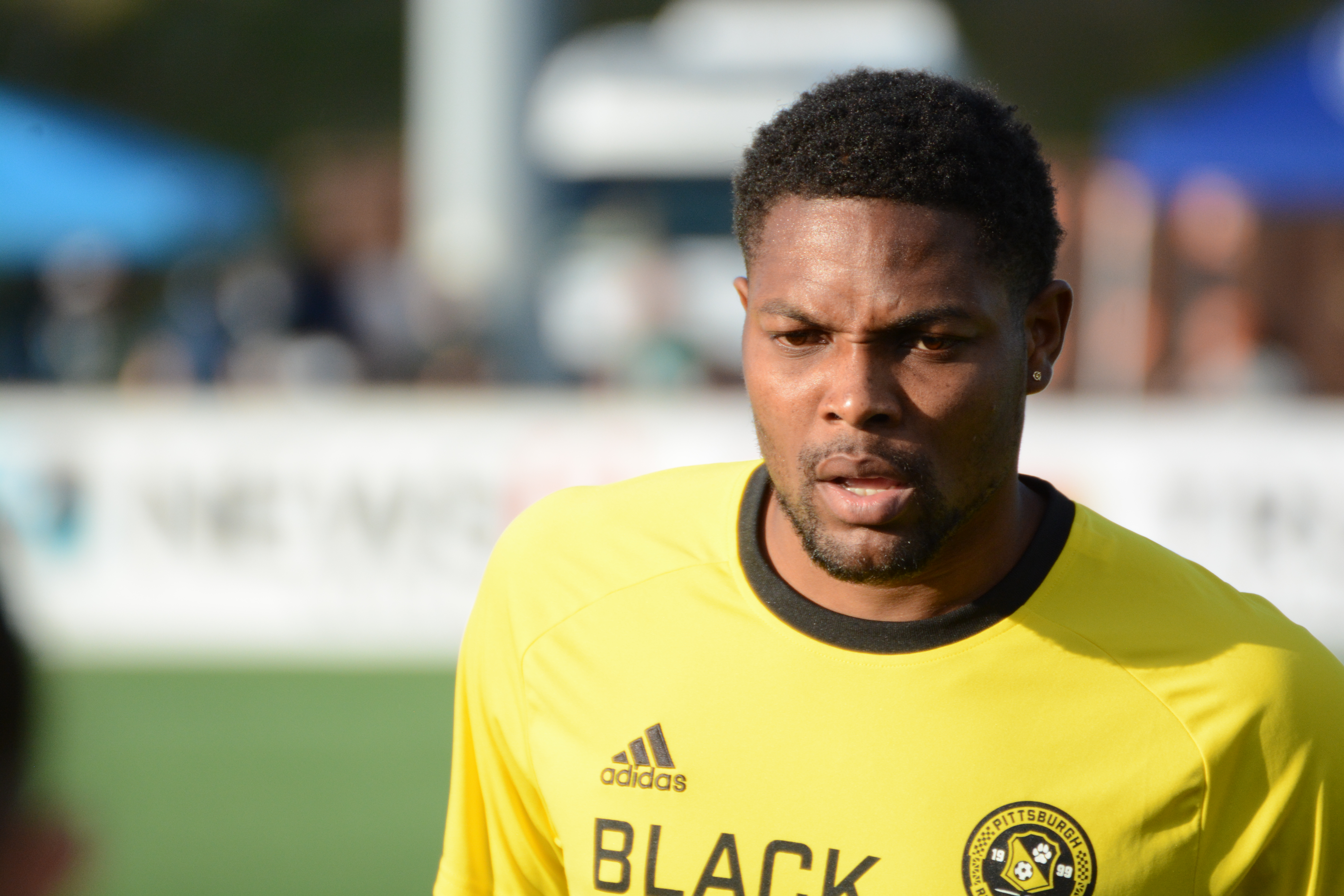
- Williams in 2021

Personal information
- Full name: Mekeil Andy Williams
- Date of birth: 24 July 1990 (age 36)
- Place of birth: Port of Spain, Trinidad and Tobago
- Height: 1.86 m (6 ft 1 in)
- Position: Centre-back

Team information
- Current team: Police FC

Senior career*
Years	Team	Apps	(Gls)
2009	Ma Pau		
2011–2012	W Connection		
2012	→ Pogoń Szczecin (loan)	9	(1)
2012–2013	FC Fyn	8	(0)
2013–2015	W Connection		
2015–2016	Antigua GFC	25	(0)
2016–2017	Colorado Rapids	38	(0)
2018	Richmond Kickers	27	(0)
2019	Oklahoma City Energy	28	(1)
2020	Municipal	12	(0)
2021–2022	Pittsburgh Riverhounds	53	(1)
2023	Chattanooga Red Wolves	29	(1)
2024–	Police FC		

International career
2012–2022	Trinidad and Tobago	32	(1)
- * Club domestic league appearances and goals as of 10:11, 24 July 2024 (UTC)

Mekeil Andy Williams (born 24 July 1990) is a Trinidadian professional footballer who plays as a centre-back for Police FC.

== Club career ==
Born in Port of Spain, Williams spent his early career with Ma Pau and W Connection. In February 2012 he joined Polish club Pogoń Szczecin on a five-month loan deal. He moved to Danish club FC Fyn in August 2012 on a free transfer. After returning to Trinidad to play with W Connection, he signed a two-year contract with Guatemalan club Antigua GFC in June 2015.

Williams signed for Major League Soccer side Colorado Rapids on 4 February 2016.

Williams signed for USL side Richmond Kickers for the 2018 season on 16 February 2018.

He signed for Oklahoma City Energy for the 2019 season.

Williams moved to Liga Nacional de Fútbol de Guatemala side Municipal on 30 December 2019.

On 10 March 2021, Williams signed a one-year deal with USL Championship side Pittsburgh Riverhounds.

Williams joined USL League One side Chattanooga Red Wolves on 2 March 2023.

== International career ==
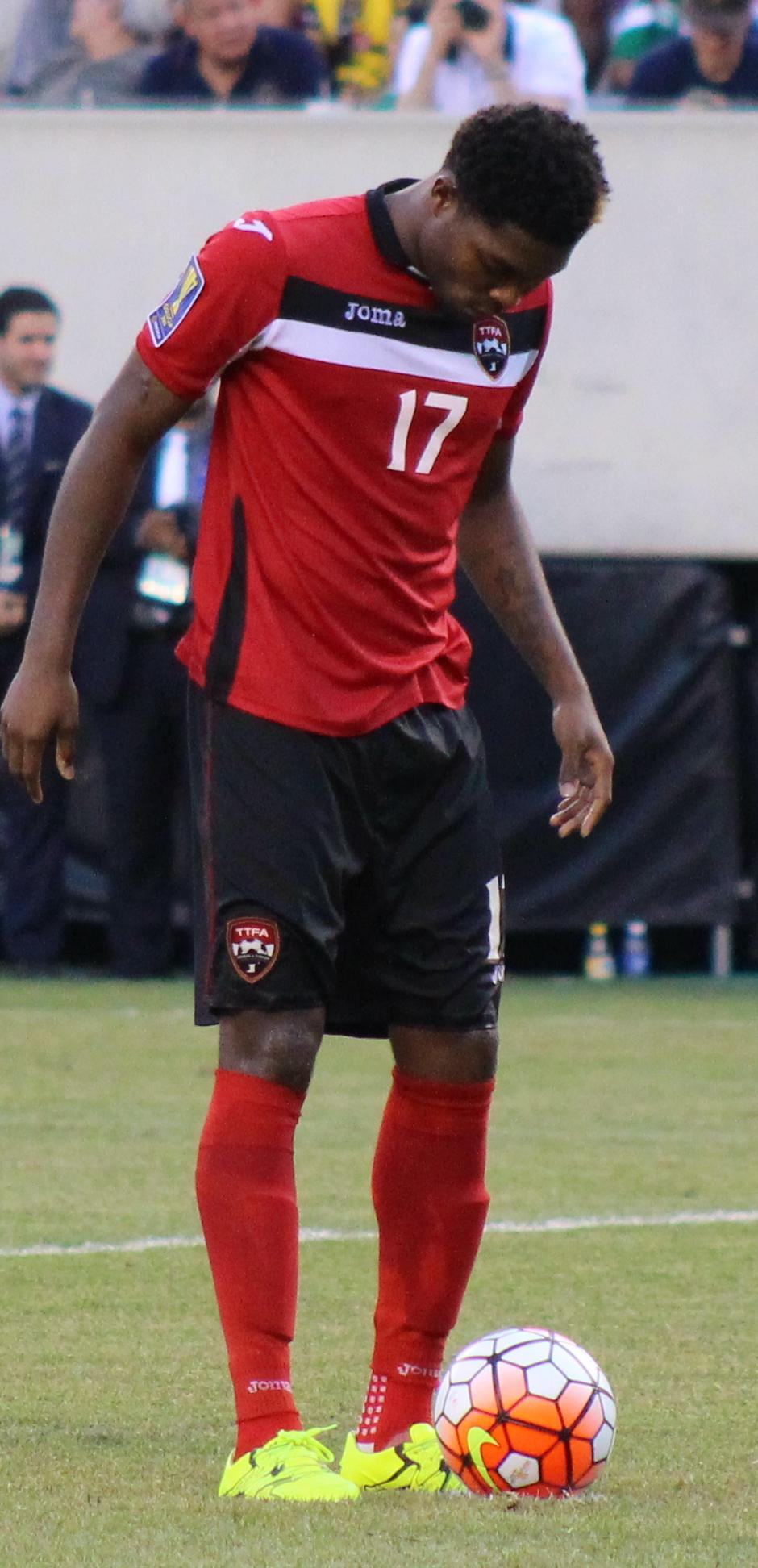
Williams with Trinidad and Tobago.

He made his senior international debut for Trinidad and Tobago in 2012, scoring on his debut.

== Career statistics ==
=== International ===
Appearances and goals by national team and year
National team	Year	Apps	Goals
Trinidad and Tobago	2012	1	1
Trinidad and Tobago	2013	–	
Trinidad and Tobago	2014	–	
Trinidad and Tobago	2015	10	0
Trinidad and Tobago	2016	5	0
Trinidad and Tobago	2017	5	0
Trinidad and Tobago	2018	2	0
Trinidad and Tobago	2019	7	0
Trinidad and Tobago	2020	–	
Trinidad and Tobago	2021	3	0
Trinidad and Tobago	2022	4	0
Total		37	1

Scores and results list Trinidad and Tobago's goal tally first, score column indicates score after each Williams goal.

List of international goals scored by Mekeil
No.	Date	Venue	Opponent	Score	Result	Competition
1	22 January 2012	Hasely Crawford Stadium, Port of Spain, Trinidad and Tobago	Finland	1–0	2–3	Friendly

== Honours ==
Ma Pau

- Trinidad and Tobago Classic: 2010

Williams Connection

- TT Pro League: 2011–12, 2013–14
- Trinidad and Tobago FA Trophy: 2013–14
- Trinidad and Tobago Classic: 2011, 2013
- Trinidad and Tobago Charity Shield: 2014

Antigua GFC

- Liga Nacional de Fútbol de Guatemala: Apertura 2015
