= Trinidad and Tobago Super League Cup =

CFTL League Cup
- Founded: 2004
- Region: Trinidad and Tobago
- Teams: 19
- Current champions: Guaya United (8th title)
- Website: ttsuperleague.com
- 2017 CFTL League Cup

The Trinidad and Tobago Super League Cup, or commonly known as the CFTL League Cup for sponsorship reasons, is a league cup style football competition open for Trinidad and Tobago teams competing in the country's TT Super League. It is played on a knockout (single elimination) basis from September to November.

== Sponsorship ==
The League Cup's sponsor was CFTL for 2017, however this will be the only year they will sponsor the League Cup as they failed to pay the winners Guaya United TT$.5m contract.

Period	Sponsor	Name
2017	CFTL	CFTL League Cup

== Finals ==
=== Results ===
Key
*	Match decided in extra time
^{†}	Match decided by a penalty shootout after regulation time
^{‡}	Match decided by a penalty shootout after extra time

Season	Winner	Score	Runners–up	Venue
2017	Guaya United	3–1	Prisons	Ato Boldon Stadium
