= Gary Glasgow =

Trinidadian footballer (born 1976)

Personal information
- Date of birth: 13 May 1976 (age 50)
- Place of birth: Arima, Trinidad and Tobago
- Height: 1.78 m (5 ft 10 in)
- Position: Forward

Senior career*
Years	Team	Apps	(Gls)
1996	San Juan Jabloteh		
1997	Defence Force	30	(26)
1998	New Orleans Storm	24	(15)
1999	Richmond Kickers	28	(14)
2000–2002	Kansas City Wizards	32	(5)
2002	Hampton Roads Mariners	19	(1)
2003–2004	Guangzhou Xiangxue/Guangzhou Rizhiquan	40	(9)
2005	Henan Jianye	3	(0)
2005	North East Stars		
2006–2008	Joe Public		
2009	United Petrotrin		
2010–2013	North East Stars		
2013–2017	WASA St. Joseph		
2018	Guaya United	5	(2)
Total		181+	(72+)

International career
1995–2007	Trinidad and Tobago	52	(14)
- * Club domestic league appearances and goals

Gary Glasgow (born 13 May 1976) is a Trinidadian former professional footballer who played as a forward.

== Career ==
Born in Arima, Glasgow played in Trinidad, the United States, and China for San Juan Jabloteh, Defence Force, New Orleans Storm, Richmond Kickers, Kansas City Wizards, Hampton Roads Mariners, Guangzhou Xiangxue/Guangzhou Rizhiquan, Henan Jianye, North East Stars, Joe Public, United Petrotrin, WASA St. Joseph and Guaya United.

He also played for Trinidad and Tobago at international level, scoring 14 goals in 52 games.

== International goals ==
Scores and results list Trinidad and Tobago's goal tally first, score column indicates score after each Glasgow goal.

List of international goals scored by Gary Glasgow
No.	Date	Venue	Opponent	Score	Result	Competition	Ref.
1	24 October 1995	Truman Bodden Sports Complex, George Town, Cayman Islands	Cayman Islands	–	7–0	Friendly	
2	24 October 1995	Truman Bodden Sports Complex, George Town, Cayman Islands	Cayman Islands	–	7–0	Friendly	
3	2 April 1997	Queen's Park Oval, Port of Spain, Trinidad and Tobago	Guyana	2–0	3–0	Friendly	
4	6 April 1997	Arima Velodrome, Arima, Trinidad and Tobago	Grenada	–	2–3	Friendly	
5	6 April 1997	Arima Velodrome, Arima, Trinidad and Tobago	Grenada	–	2–3	Friendly	
6	17 November 1999	Estadio General Francisco Morazán, San Pedro Sula, Honduras	Honduras	2–3	2–3	Friendly	
7	2 July 2000	Arnos Vale Stadium, Arnos Vale, Saint Vincent and the Grenadines	Saint Vincent and the Grenadines	–	1–2	Friendly	
8	15 November 2002	Hasely Crawford Stadium, Port of Spain, Trinidad and Tobago	Saint Kitts and Nevis	1–0	2–0	2003 CONCACAF Gold Cup qualification	
9	10 July 2004	Suphachalasai Stadium, Bangkok, Thailand	Thailand	2–0	2–3	Friendly	
10	9 January 2005	Manny Ramjohn Stadium, San Fernando, Trinidad and Tobago	Saint Vincent and the Grenadines	1–1	3–1	2005 Caribbean Cup qualification	
11	12 January 2007	Hasely Crawford Stadium, Port of Spain, Trinidad and Tobago	Barbados	1–0	1–1	2007 Caribbean Cup	
12	15 January 2007	Hasely Crawford Stadium, Port of Spain, Trinidad and Tobago	Martinique	3–1	5–1	2007 Caribbean Cup	
13	15 January 2007	Hasely Crawford Stadium, Port of Spain, Trinidad and Tobago	Martinique	5–1	5–1	2007 Caribbean Cup	
14	17 January 2007	Hasely Crawford Stadium, Port of Spain, Trinidad and Tobago	Haiti	2–1	3–1	2007 Caribbean Cup	
15	17 January 2007	Hasely Crawford Stadium, Port of Spain, Trinidad and Tobago	Haiti	3–1	3–1	2007 Caribbean Cup	
16	20 January 2007	Hasely Crawford Stadium, Port of Spain, Trinidad and Tobago	Cuba	1–1	3–1	2007 Caribbean Cup	
