= Seon Power =

Trinidadian footballer (born 1984)

Personal information
- Date of birth: 2 February 1984 (age 42)
- Place of birth: Arima, Trinidad and Tobago
- Height: 1.90 m (6 ft 3 in)
- Position: Defender

Senior career*
Years	Team	Apps	(Gls)
2003–2009	Joe Public		
2010–2011	Ma Pau		
2011–2013	North East Stars		
2013–2015	Chainat Hornbill	34	(3)
2015	→ Dome (loan)		
2016	Phuket		
2017	Central FC		
2018	Ulaanbaatar City FC		
2019	Krabi	13	(1)
2019	Nara United	3	(1)
2020	Banbueng		
2021–2022	Prey Veng		
2022	→ Visakha FC (loan)	14	(1)

International career
2007–2013	Trinidad and Tobago	38	(2)
- * Club domestic league appearances and goals

Seon Power (born 2 February 1984) is a Trinidadian former professional footballer as a defender . Between 2007 and 2013 he made 38 appearances for the Trinidad and Tobago national team, scoring twice.

== Club career ==
Born in Arima, Power has played club football for Joe Public, Ma Pau, North East Stars and Chainat Hornbill.

In July 2015 he moved on loan to Dome.

He then played for Phuket before returning to Trinidad with Central FC.

In April 2018 it was announced that Power had signed for Ulaanbaatar City FC of the Mongolia Premier League for the 2018 season.

He returned to Thailand with Krabi FC for the 2019 season, and also spent time with Nara United and Banbueng.

He signed for Cambodian club Prey Veng FC for the 2021 season.

== International career ==
Power made his international debut for Trinidad and Tobago in 2007, and has appeared in FIFA World Cup qualifying matches.

== Career statistics ==
Scores and results list Trinidad and Tobago's goal tally first.

No	Date	Venue	Opponent	Score	Result	Competition
1.	26 January 2008	Juan Ramón Loubriel Stadium, Bayamón, Puerto Rico	Puerto Rico	2–2	2–2	Friendly
2.	16 November 2012	Dwight Yorke Stadium, Bacolet, Trinidad and Tobago	Suriname	1–0	3–0	2012 Caribbean Cup qualification
