= Guaya United F.C. =

Guaya United FC
- Full name: Guaya United Active Youth Association
- Nickname(s): Guaya United
- Founded: 2010
- Ground: Guayaguayare Recreation Ground
- Capacity: 1,000
- Manager: Calvin Hughes
- League: National Super League
- 2018: 5th
Home colours	Away colours

Guaya United FC is a Trinidad and Tobago football club, based in Guayaguayare, that plays in the National Super League. The club is located in the southeast of Trinidad in its oil belt region.

The club was established in 2010. It won the 2013 Super League title in its inaugural year of participation in the competition, becoming the first club to do so. Since then, Guaya United has competed regularly in Trinidad and Tobago football, including campaigns in the TT Premier Football League Tier 2.

In 2023, the Trinidad and Tobago Football Association (TTFA) issued a public apology to Guaya United following a dispute over player eligibility. The club has also been subject to disciplinary measures, including sanctions reported in the national press.

== Stadium ==
The club plays its home matches at the Guayaguayare Recreation Ground, located in Guayaguayare, which has a capacity of about 1,000.

== Honours ==
- National Super League
  - Champions: 2013–14
