= Walter Moore (footballer, born 1984) =

Guyanese footballer

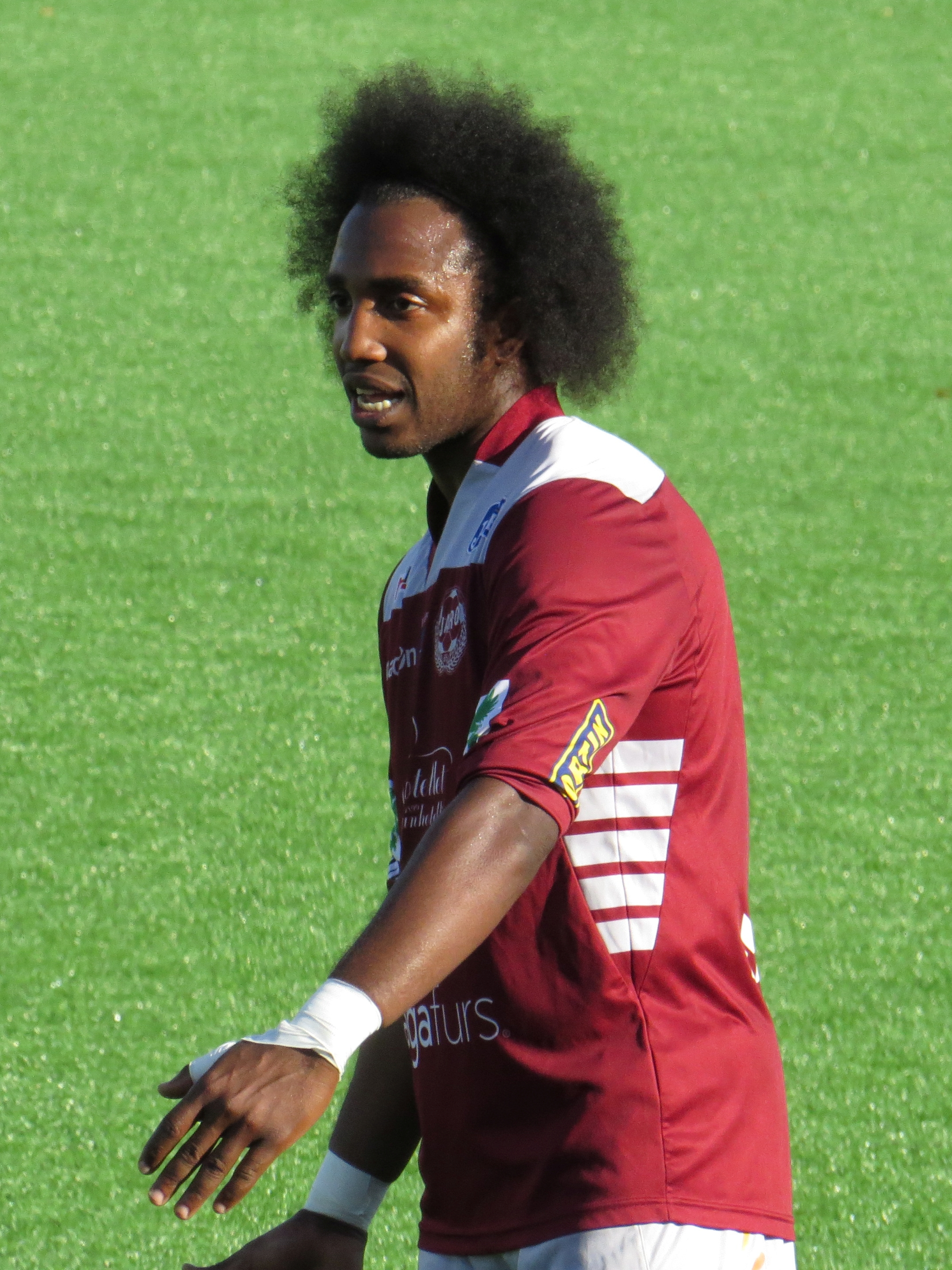
- Walter Moore in 2015

Personal information
- Full name: Walter Andre Moore
- Date of birth: 1 September 1984 (age 42)
- Place of birth: Guyana
- Height: 6 ft 1 in (1.85 m)
- Positions: Left-back; left midfielder

Senior career*
Years	Team	Apps	(Gls)
2006	North East Stars	27	(4)
2007–2013	Caledonia AIA	115	(24)
2010	→ Alpha United (loan)		
2011	→ Charlotte Eagles (loan)	18	(1)
2013	Vostok	31	(1)
2014	Astana-1964	6	(0)
2015–2018	FF Jaro	76	(4)
2018	AC Oulu	26	(1)
2019	FF Jaro	23	(1)

International career
2004–2019	Guyana	77	(5)
- * Club domestic league appearances and goals

Walter Moore (born 1 September 1984) is a Guyanese former professional footballer who played as a left-back and left midfielder. He is the Guyana national team's most-capped footballer.

== Club career ==
Moore has played extensively in Trinidad and Tobago TT Pro League, for North East Stars and Caledonia AIA. He was part of the Caledonia team which won both the Trinidad and Tobago Cup and the Trinidad and Tobago Pro Bowl in 2008.

Moore was loaned by Caledonia AIA to Charlotte Eagles of the USL Pro league in April 2011.

Moore left FC Astana-1964 during the summer of 2014.

In March 2015, Moore moved to Finland, signing a two-year contract with FF Jaro. In 2018, Moore left Jaro for AC Oulu. In 2019, he returned to FF Jaro.

== International career ==
Moore has played left back for the Guyana national football team since 2004. He scored his first international goal on 13 October 2010 in a 2010 Caribbean Championship game against the Netherlands Antilles. Moore retired from international football in October 2016. But he did make a return to the squad; on 13 October, he made a start against Turks and Caicos Islands in the CONCACAF Nations League Qualifying and they defeated them 8–0 in Providenciales.

== Career statistics ==
=== International ===
Guyana
Year	Apps	Goals
2004	2	0
2005	2	0
2006	10	0
2007	3	0
2008	15	0
2009	0	0
2010	8	2
2011	7	1
2012	15	2
2013	0	0
2014	3	0
2015	3	0
2016	5	0
2017	1	0
2018	2	0
2019	1	0
Total	77	5

Statistics accurate as of match played 16 March 2019

=== International goals ===
Scores and results list Guyana's goal tally first.

No.	Date	Venue	Opponent	Score	Result	Competition
1.	15 October 2010	André Kamperveen Stadion, Paramaribo, Suriname	Netherlands Antilles	3–0	3–2	2010 Caribbean Cup qualification
2.	17 October 2010	Andre Kamperveen Stadion, Paramaribo, Suriname	Suriname	1–0	2–0	2010 Caribbean Cup qualification
3.	24 August 2011	Providence Stadium, Providence, Guyana	India	2–1	2–1	Friendly
4.	22 February 2012	Grenada National Stadium, St. George's, Grenada	Grenada	2–1	2–1	Friendly
5.	18 November 2012	Grenada National Stadium, St. George's, Grenada	French Guiana	2–1	2–1	2012 Caribbean Cup qualification
