= Trinidad and Tobago Classic =

TOYOTA Classic
- Founded: 2005
- Region: Trinidad and Tobago
- Teams: 16
- Current champions: San Juan Jabloteh (2nd title)
- Most championships: W Connection (3 titles)
- Website: TOYOTA Classic

The Trinidad and Tobago Classic, or commonly known as the TOYOTA Classic, is a knockout tournament for teams in Trinidad and Tobago's TT Pro League and National Super League. The football competition began in 2005, with TOYOTA as the primary sponsor, and is currently contested each October and November following the Pro League and Super League seasons.

The inaugural competition was contested between San Juan Jabloteh and W Connection, with the Savonetta Boys claiming their first title with a 1–0 win. United Petrotrin claimed the trophy in 2006, as well as, Joe Public capturing their first in 2007. San Juan Jabloteh took the trophy in 2008 with a win over St. Ann's Rangers in Hasely Crawford Stadium. Joe Public became the first club in 2009 to win the TOYOTA Classic twice. In 2010, Ma Pau won their first competitive trophy after defeating North East Stars in the Classic's first final decided on a penalty shootout. W Connection became the second club to win the Classic in 2011 by defeating Pro League newcomers T&TEC. North East Stars defeated Defence Force 4–2 on penalties after the match ended in a 2–2 draw in the 2012 final.

The current theme is It's a Hard Road to the Final and There Are No Free Rides, with the winner receiving TT$50,000 and the runners-up collecting TT$35,000.

== Format ==
The knockout tournament begins in the first round with all TT Pro League teams automatically entering the competition. Following each National Super League season, the top eight teams in the final league table qualify and enter in the first round as well.

The draw for the first round is performed prior to the start of the tournament. The 16 teams in the competition, valued at TT$85,000 in total sponsorship, are drawn into four groups, all named after TOYOTA branded vehicles, Terios (Group A), Sirion (Group B), Delta (Group C), and Daihatsu (Group D) and are seeded based on their positions in their respective leagues. Clubs from the Super League look forward to meeting a Pro League team at home. Top-ranked teams look for easy opposition, but have to be on their guard against lower teams with ambition.

All matches are played over two 45 minutes halves, and in the process the match is drawn at the end of regulation time, penalty kicks shall determine the winner.

== Finals ==
=== Results ===
Key
*	Match decided in extra time
^{†}	Match decided by a penalty shootout after regulation time
^{‡}	Match decided by a penalty shootout after extra time
Italics	Team from outside the top level of Trinidad and Tobago football

Season	Winner	Score	Runners–up	Venue
2005	W Connection	1–0	San Juan Jabloteh	Manny Ramjohn Stadium
2006	United Petrotrin	4–0	Superstar Rangers	Manny Ramjohn Stadium
2007	Joe Public	2–1	San Juan Jabloteh	Hasely Crawford Stadium
2008	San Juan Jabloteh	2–1	St. Ann's Rangers	Hasely Crawford Stadium
2009	Joe Public (2)	4–0	San Juan Jabloteh	Marvin Lee Stadium
2010	Ma Pau	1–1^{†}	North East Stars	Marvin Lee Stadium
2011	W Connection (2)	0–0^{†}	T&TEC	Manny Ramjohn Stadium
2012	North East Stars	2–2^{†}	Defence Force	Hasely Crawford Stadium
2013	W Connection (3)	2–0	Club Sando	Ato Boldon Stadium
2014	San Juan Jabloteh (2)	1–1^{†}	Point Fortin Civic	Ato Boldon Stadium

== Results by team ==
Club	Wins	Last final won	Runners-up	Last final lost
W Connection	3	2013	0	
Joe Public	2	2009	0	
San Juan Jabloteh	2	2014	3	2009
North East Stars	1	2012	1	2010
Ma Pau	1	2010	0	
United Petrotrin	1	2006	0	
St. Ann's Rangers	0		2	2008
Club Sando	0		1	2013
Defence Force	0		1	2012
Point Fortin Civic	0		1	2014
T&TEC	0		1	2011
