= Trent Noel =

Trinidadian football midfielder

Personal information
- Date of birth: 14 January 1976 (age 50)
- Place of birth: Trinidad and Tobago
- Position: Centre midfielder

Team information
- Current team: Joe Public
- Number: 8

Senior career*
Years	Team	Apps	(Gls)
1999–2001	Police FC		
2002–2008	San Juan Jabloteh		
2009–2016	Joe Public	17	(6)
2016–	Police FC II		

International career^{‡}
2001–2010	Trinidad and Tobago	36	(0)
- * Club domestic league appearances and goals ‡ National team caps and goals as of 25 July 2011

Trent Noel (born 14 January 1976) is a Trinidadian football midfielder. He currently plays for Joe Public of the TT Pro League. He has also represented Trinidad and Tobago on national team.
