= Cleon John =

Trinidad and Tobago footballer

Personal information
- Date of birth: 25 October 1981 (age 45)
- Position: Goalkeeper

Team information
- Current team: North East Stars

Senior career*
Years	Team	Apps	(Gls)
2008–2012	San Juan Jabloteh		
2012–	North East Stars		

International career^{‡}
2013–	Trinidad and Tobago	1	(0)
- * Club domestic league appearances and goals as of 9 June 2014 ‡ National team caps and goals as of 9 June 2014

Cleon John (born 25 October 1981) is a Trinidad and Tobago international footballer who plays for North East Stars, as a goalkeeper.

== Career ==
John has played club football for San Juan Jabloteh and North East Stars.

He made his international debut for Trinidad and Tobago in 2013.
