= Trinidad and Tobago football league system =

- Country: Trinidad and Tobago
- Sport: Association football
- Promotion and relegation: Yes

National system
- Federation: Trinidad and Tobago Football Association
- Confederation: CONCACAF
- Top division: Premier Football League
- Second division: Premier Football League 2
- Cup competition: TT Classic; Charity Shield; FA Trophy; Goal Shield; League Cup; Pro Bowl

The Trinidad and Tobago football league system, also known as the football pyramid, is a series of interconnected leagues for men's association football clubs in Trinidad and Tobago. The system has a hierarchical format with promotion and relegation between leagues at different levels and is governed by the Trinidad and Tobago Football Association at the national level. There are over eight individual leagues, containing more than ten divisions. The exact number of clubs varies from year to year as clubs join and leave leagues or fold altogether, but an estimated average of 10 clubs per division implies that more than 100 clubs are members of a league in the Trinidad and Tobago football league system.

== Structure ==
At the top is the single division of the TT Pro League (which is often referred to as the "top flight"), containing ten clubs. Below the Pro League is the National Super League (Level 2), which contains 13 clubs. All the teams in the Pro League are full-time professional teams, but the Super League is semi-professional containing a few clubs that have close affiliations with Pro League clubs.

Outside the top two levels of the pyramid, at Levels 3 and 4, are the six regional football association leagues. Each regional association operates its own respective top division (Level 3): Premier Division (Central Football Association), Premier Division (Eastern Football Association), Football Union (Eastern Counties), Premier Division (Northern Football Association), Premier Division (Southern Football Association), and Premier Division (Tobago Football Association).these clubs are amateur, The amateur leagues that operate a second-tier division (Level 4) are the Northern FA, Southern FA, and Tobago FA.

== Promotion and relegation ==
1. TT Premier Football League (level 1, 11 clubs): Top team becomes Champions of Trinidad and Tobago, (no promotion). No automatic relegation.
2. TT Premier Football League 2 (level 2, 15 clubs): No automatic promotion and clubs may apply for admission into level 1. However, clubs with an affiliation with a current Level 1 club may not be promoted. Bottom two clubs are relegated, to each club's appropriate regional football association league.
3. Regional FA Leagues (level 3, 60 clubs in 6 regional leagues): The top club in each football association's regional league competes in the promotion playoffs, with the top two teams gaining promotion. Each league has its own promotion and relegation rules.

== Cup eligibility ==
Being members of a league at a particular level also affects eligibility for Cup, or single-elimination, competitions.

- FA Trophy: Levels 1–3
- TOYOTA Classic: Levels 1–2
- First Citizens Cup: Level 1
- Digicel Pro Bowl: Level 1
- Lucozade Sport Goal Shield: Level 1
- National Super League Cup: Level 2
- TTPFL Knockout Cup: Levels 1-2

Beyond Level 2 the pyramid becomes regional and the cups become accordingly regional. Further down the pyramid is split on a football association basis, with each association having their own cups accordingly.

== The system ==
The table below shows the current structure of the system. For each division, its official name, sponsorship name, and number of clubs is given. At levels 1–4, each division promotes to the division(s) that lie directly above it and relegates to the division(s) that lie directly below it.

Level	League(s)/Division(s)					
1	TT Premier Football League; 11 clubs - 1 relegation, 2 qualified for the CONCACAF Caribbean Cup.					
2	TT Premier Football League 2; 15 clubs – 2 relegations, 2 promotions.					
3	Central FA Premier Division; 11 clubs - 2r, 0-1p	Eastern FA Premier Division; 9 clubs - 2r, 0-1p	Eastern Counties Football Union; Unknown (probably 7 to 14) - 0r, 0-1p	Northern FA Premier Division; 8 clubs - 2r, 0-1p	Southern FA Premier Division; 11 clubs - 2r, 0-1p	Tobago FA Premier Division; 12 clubs – 2r, 0-1 p
4	None	Eastern FA First Division; 10 clubs - 2 promoted	None	Northern FA First Division; 10 clubs - 2 promoted	Southern FA First Division; 8 clubs - 2 promoted	Tobago FA First Division; 13 clubs – 2p, 2r
5	None	None	None	None	None	Tobago FA Second Division; 13 clubs – 2p

== See also ==
- Association football in Trinidad and Tobago
- League system, for a list of similar systems in other countries.
