= Densill Theobald =

Trinidadian footballer

Densill Theobald CM
Personal information
- Date of birth: 27 June 1982 (age 44)
- Place of birth: Port of Spain, Trinidad and Tobago
- Height: 1.81 m (5 ft 11 in)
- Position: Central midfielder

Youth career
- 1999: Jean Lillywhite CC

Senior career*
Years	Team	Apps	(Gls)
2000	Toronto Olympians	4	(0)
2002	Caledonia AIA	11	(4)
2003	Joe Public	17	(8)
2004–2005	Caledonia AIA	10	(6)
2005–2006	Falkirk	0	(0)
2006–2007	Caledonia AIA	13	(2)
2007	Újpest	7	(0)
2008–2011	Caledonia AIA	16	(3)
2011–2012	Dempo	15	(0)
2012–2014	Caledonia AIA		(9)
2014–2015	Royal Wahingdoh	20	(3)
2015−2016	Sporting Goa	7	(0)
2016−2017	Morvant Caledonia United	10	(2)
2017	Mumbai FC	14	(0)
2017	North East Stars		(2)

International career
2002–2013	Trinidad and Tobago	99	(2)
- * Club domestic league appearances and goals

Densill Theobald CM (born 27 June 1982) is a Trinidadian former professional footballer who played as a central midfielder and represented Trinidad and Tobago national team 99 times, scoring twice.

== Club career ==
=== Early career and moves to Europe ===
Theobald joined Scottish club Falkirk in the summer transfer window of 2005, after the recommendation of international team-mate Russell Latapy. Although he played regularly at the international level, he never played a first-team game for Falkirk and so he left the club and returned to Caledonia AIA, in the summer of 2007 he returned to Europe, and joined the Hungarian team Újpest FC.

Theobald joined the Seattle Sounders for a trial in February 2009, but did not make the club's roster.

=== Dempo ===
On 16 January 2012, it was officially announced that after terms were agreed with Újpest and Caledonia AIA that Theobald has signed for Dempo SC in the I-League in India.

=== Royal Wahingdoh ===
In December 2014, Theobald signed for newly promoted I-League club Royal Wahingdoh form Shillong for one season. He appeared in all games for Wahingdoh, and the team ended their debut season in third position with 30 points after 20 league matches.

=== Sporting De Goa ===
In December 2015, Theobald signed for Sporting de Goa.

=== Mumbai FC ===
In January 2017, he signed with another I-League club Mumbai FC.

== International career ==
Theobald was a regular member of the Trinidad and Tobago national team and played in all three of the country's World Cup games at the 2006 FIFA World Cup.

Following the retirements of Dwight Yorke and Dennis Lawrence from international football, Theobald has since been named captain of the 'Soca Warriors'.

He appeared in several editions of Caribbean Cup and he was in the squad of Trinidad's silver medal-winning team at the 2012 Caribbean Cup, where they lost in the final to Cuba.

Scores and results list Trinidad and Tobago's goal tally first, score column indicates score after each Theobald goal.

List of international goals scored by Densill Theobald
No.	Date	Venue	Opponent	Score	Result	Competition
1	20 June 2004	Manny Ramjohn Stadium, Marabella, Trinidad and Tobago	Dominican Republic	3-0	4-0	2006 FIFA World Cup qualification
2	20 January 2007	Hasely Crawford Stadium, Port of Spain, Trinidad and Tobago	Cuba	3-0	3-1	2007 Caribbean Cup

== Personal life ==
As a member of the squad that competed at the 2006 FIFA World Cup in Germany, Theobald was awarded the Chaconia Medal (Gold Class), the second highest state decoration of Trinidad and Tobago.

== Honours ==
Morvant Caledonia United

- TT Pro League: 2017, runner-up 2012–13

Central

- TT League Cup: 2018
- TT Pro League: runner-up 2018
- Charity Shield: runner-up 2018

W Connection

- CFU Club Championship: 2012

Royal Wahingdoh

- I-League: third place 2014–15

Trinidad & Tobago

- Caribbean Cup: runner-up 2012

Individual

- Chaconia Medal Gold Class, 2006
