= T&TEC Sports Club =

Trinidad and Tobago football club in Gooding Village

T&TEC
- Full name: Trinidad and Tobago Electricity Commission Sports Club
- Nickname: Electricity Boys
- Ground: Manny Ramjohn Stadium; San Fernando, Trinidad and Tobago
- Capacity: 10,000
- Chairman: Peter Mohan
- Manager: Jefferson George
- League: TT Pro League
- 2012–13: TT Pro League, 8th
Home colours	Away colours

The Trinidad and Tobago Electricity Commission Sports Club (better known as the T&TEC Sports Club) is a state-owned football team from Trinidad and Tobago based in Gooding Village. The team was a member of the TT Pro League, the highest level of football in Trinidad.

In May 2012, it was announced that the Trinidad and Tobago Electricity Commission would cut funding to the team due to a shortfall in its annual budget. Peter Mohan, the Sports Club manager suggested that the club would field more TTEC employees as a way of keeping costs down.

== Club honours ==
=== League ===
- National Super League
  - Champions (1): 2010

=== Cup ===
- First Citizens Cup
  - Runners-up (1): 2011
- TOYOTA Classic
  - Runners-up (1): 2011
