= TT Super League =

TT Premier Football League 2
- Founded: 2017
- First season: 2017
- Country: Trinidad and Tobago
- Confederation: CONCACAF
- Number of clubs: 19
- Level on pyramid: 2
- Relegation to: CFA Premier Division, EFA Premier Division, Eastern Counties Football Union, NFA Premier Division, SFA Premier Division and Tobago Premier Division.
- Domestic cup: FA Trophy
- League cup: Super League Cup
- Current champions: 1976 Phoenix (2023)
- Most championships: Joe Public (4 titles)
- Broadcaster(s): https://mycujoo.tv/tt-super-league
- Website: thettfa.com/ttpremierleague
- Current: 2023-24 TT Premier Football League 2

The TT Premier Football League 2 (formerly called TT Super League) is a league for semi-professional association football clubs in Trinidad and Tobago. It is the second-highest division of the Trinidad and Tobago football league system. The league currently comprises 19 teams between 2 leagues and operates on a system of relegation between those leagues. Although the Super League champion of each season can apply for membership in the TT Pro League, the two leagues do not operate on an automatic promotion and relegation system.

The league was founded in 2003 to allow the best teams from association football to play in a semi-professional environment, as they prepare for life in the professional game. The first season took place in the same year beginning with eleven teams. As of the 2012 season, there have been a total of 36 distinct teams that have taken part in the Super League, but only six have won the title: Crab Connection, Joe Public, Police, T&TEC, WASA, and the Trinidad and Tobago U20 team. WASA are the current league champions, who claimed their second title in 2012. In 2017, the league rebranded to form the TT Super League

The winners of the National Super League may apply for promotion at the end of each season to the TT Pro League. Potential promoted clubs must be elected by Pro League members. As a consequence, there is no guarantee that winning the Super League will result in promotion. In the first ten seasons, the Super League has provided the Pro League with four teams – Superstar Rangers, Police, Joe Public, and T&TEC.

== History ==
Super League Champions
Season	Winner
2003	Crab Connection
2004	Joe Public
2005	Joe Public
2006	Police
2007	WASA
2008	Trinidad and Tobago U20
2009	Joe Public
2010	T&TEC
2011	Joe Public
2012	WASA

== Competition format ==
The league comprises 12 teams, consisting of teams from each of the country's six regional football association leagues. Over the course of a season, which runs annually from July to February, each team plays twice against the others in the league, once at their home stadium and once at that of their opponents. This makes for a total of 22 games played each season. Clubs gain three points for a win, one for a draw, and none for a defeat. The teams are ranked in the league table by points gained, then goal difference, and then goals scored.

At the end of the season, the league champion may apply for promotion to the TT Pro League. However, potential promoted clubs must be elected by Pro League members. As a consequence, there is no guarantee that winning the Super League will result in promotion. The bottom two teams are relegated to the third tier in the league system comprising the six regional leagues and are replaced by the top two finishers in a promotion playoff contested between the six regional champions.

=== Cup competitions ===
In addition to competing in the annual Trinidad and Tobago Football Association Trophy, Super League clubs are also invited to enter the Classic (currently called the TOYOTA Classic) organised by the TT Pro League. The National Super League organises one knock-out cup competition: the Super League Cup. The League Cup was established in 2004 and is open to all Super League clubs.

== Sponsorship ==
The National Super League has been sponsored since its inception in 2003. The sponsor has been able to determine the league's sponsorship name. The list below details who the sponsors have been and what they called the competition:

2003–2005: All Sport (All-Sport National Super League)
2006–2013: bmobile (bmobile National Super League)

== Clubs ==
A total of 36 distinct teams have played in the National Super League since its inception in 2003, however, only six have won the league title. In addition, only WASA have been members of the league since its inception.

The following 11 clubs competed in the TT Premier League during the 2023 TT Premier League season.

=== League 1 ===
Club	Location	Stadium
1976 Phoenix	Canaan	Canaan and Bon Accord Recreation Grounds
Bethel United	Bethel	Montgomery Recreation Ground
Club Sando Moruga	Moruga	Grand Chemin Recreation Ground
Cunupia	Cunupia	Larry Gomes Stadium
Defence Force	Chaguaramas	Defence Force Sports Field
Guaya United	Guayaguayare	New Lands Recreation Ground
Police	Saint James	St. James Barracks
QPCC	Port of Spain	Hasely Crawford Stadium
Santa Rosa	Arima	Arima Velodrome
Siparia Spurs	Palo Seco	Palo Seco Recreation Ground
UTT	O'Meara	UTT Campus Ground
WASA	Saint Joseph	WASA Ground

=== League 2 ===
Club	Location	Stadium
Central 500 Spartans	Chaguanas	Edinburgh 500 Recreation Ground
Harlem Strikers	Frederick Settlement	Frederick Settlement Recreation Ground
Perseverance Ball Runners	New Settlement	New Settlement Recreation Ground
Petit Valley/Diego Martin United	Diego Martin	Diego Martin North Secondary School Ground
Prisons	Arouca	Youth Training Centre
Marabella FCC	Marabella	Guaracara Park
Youth Stars	Roxborough	Roxborough Complex

== Top scorers ==
Season	Scorer	Club	Goals
2003			
2004	(Jamaica) Roen Nelson	Joe Public	30
2005	(Jamaica) Roen Nelson	Joe Public	22
2005	(Jamaica) Carlington Smith	Joe Public	22
2006			
2007			
2008			
2009			
2010	(Trinidad and Tobago) Kevon Neaves	T&TEC	19
2011	(Trinidad and Tobago) Brent Antoine	Joe Public	14
2012	(Trinidad and Tobago) Troy Thompson	Westside Super Starz	16

== See also ==
- Trinidad and Tobago Football Association
- Association football in Trinidad and Tobago
- Trinidad and Tobago national football team
