= Trinidad and Tobago FA Trophy =

Football tournament

FA Trophy
- Founded: 1927
- Region: Trinidad and Tobago
- Teams: 64
- Current champions: North East Stars (2nd title)
- Most championships: Maple Club; Malvern United (7 titles each)
- Website: ttffonline.com/fa_trophy
- 2017 FA Trophy

The Trinidad and Tobago FA Trophy, is the premier knockout tournament for teams in Trinidad and Tobago that is open to all clubs affiliated with the Trinidad and Tobago Football Association. The FA Trophy is the oldest football competition in Trinidad and Tobago, dating back to 1927 when Shamrock claimed the inaugural trophy. Since the competition involves clubs of all standards playing against each other, there is the possibility for 'giant-killers' from the lower divisions of eliminating top clubs from the tournament and even theoretically win the trophy, although lower division teams rarely reach the final.

The trophy is currently contested each December through March following the National Super League season and the first round of matches in the TT Pro League. The current holders of the FA Trophy are North East Stars, who defeated fellow Pro League side W Connection in the 2014–15 final on 29 March 2015.

== Format ==
The competition is a knockout tournament with pairings for each round drawn at random – there are no seeds, and the draw for each round is not made until after the scheduled dates for the previous round. The draw also determines which teams will play at home.

Each tie is played as a single leg. If a match is drawn after regulation time, then the match is determined by extra time and a penalty shootout, as required. Until the 1990s, a draw would result in the match being replayed two or three days after the original game. In the result of a drawn replay, extra time and penalty shootouts were used to determine the winner. However, beginning in 1999 each match is decided in its current format.

There are a total of six rounds in the competition – first, second, and third rounds, followed by the quarterfinals, semifinals, and the final. The competition begins in December with the first round where eight teams are entered into the competition. The remaining teams enter the FA Trophy in the second round. Each round is contested until the champion has been decided by single-elimination. Along with presented the trophy, the winning team also receives 23 gold medals and the runners-up receive 23 silver medals following the competition.

=== The draw ===
The draw for each round, performed by drawing numbered balls from a bag, is a source of great interest to clubs and their supporters. Sometimes two top clubs may be drawn against each other in the early rounds, removing the possibility of them meeting in the final. Lower-ranked clubs with reputations as 'giant-killers' look forward to meeting a top team. Top-ranked teams look for easy opposition, but have to be on their guard against 'giant-killers' and lower teams with ambition.

=== Eligible teams ===
All clubs in the TT Pro League are automatically eligible and the top six clubs following the league season in the National Super League are also eligible to enter the competition. Clubs from the six regional football association leagues that consist the third level of the football pyramid are also eligible. However, qualification is determined by the club's respective regional football association and narrowed to the top three clubs from each league. All clubs entering the competition must have a suitable stadium.

The number of entrants increased from 32 to 36 beginning with the 2011–12 edition. The Trinidad and Tobago Football Association decided to include the top four teams from the Secondary Schools Football League to provide youth players an opportunity to compete with professional and semi-professional clubs. By comparison, the other major Trinidad and Tobago domestic cup, the First Citizens Cup, involves only the members of the TT Pro League.

== Trophy ==
There have been 35 different trophy winners with Malvern United and Maple Club claiming the most titles with seven each.

At the end of the final, the winning team is presented with a trophy, also known as the "FA Trophy", which they hold until the following year's final. Individual members of the teams playing in the final are presented with winners' and runners'-up medals. The present FA Trophy has been used since the inception of the tournament in 1927. Following the awarding of the winners' medals, the trophy is presented by President of the Trinidad and Tobago Football Association to the winning team's captain.

Eight clubs have won consecutive FA Trophies: Everton (1929–32), Colts (1944–45), United British Oilfields Trinidad (1950–51), Malvern United (1960–61), Maple Club (1970–72), ASL Sports Club (1982–83), W Connection (1999–2000), and Caledonia AIA (2012–13). However, there has not been any clubs to win consecutive FA Trophies on more than one occasion. With the start of the League Cup in 1997, there has not been any clubs that have won the FA Trophy as part of a League and Cup double. In 1985, Defence Force added the 1985 Champions' Cup crown to their double, an accomplishment known as the continental treble.

=== Winners from outside the top flight ===
Since the debut of professional teams into the competition in 1999, clubs from the former Professional Football League (PFL) and the current TT Pro League have won the cup in all but one of those years. WASA of the Super League were surprise winners in 2006, defeating two professional clubs, including the North East Stars 4–2 on penalties after the championship match ended drawn 3–3. In fact, WASA remains the only club to win the trophy from outside the top flight since the introduction of professional clubs.

There has been only one other occurrence of a team outside to the professional ranks to reach the final. In 2001, Carib from the Eastern FA, reached the final after defeating North East Stars and Police of the PFL. However, Carib fell to their third professional opponent, Joe Public, in the final.
