= La Horquetta Rangers F.C. =

La Horquetta Rangers
- Full name: La Horquetta Rangers Football Club
- Nickname: Rangers
- Ground: Hasely Crawford Stadium; Mucurapo, Trinidad and Tobago
- Capacity: 23,000
- Coach: Adrian Romain
- League: TT Pro League
- 2025–26: 8th
Home colours

La Horquetta Rangers F.C. (formerly known as St. Ann's Rangers) is a Trinidad and Tobago football team and a member of the TT Pro League. The team was based in St. Ann's and they played their home games at the Hasely Crawford Stadium in Mucurapo.

== History ==
St. Ann's Rangers is a football club hailing from the St. Ann, Port-of-Spain area. "Rangers" as the Club is commonly referred to, has represented the area of St. Ann's for over 30 years, competing at the highest levels of the game locally, fielding both Male (TT Pro League – Senior, Reserves, Youth) and Female (TTWoLF – Senior) teams.

Although St. Ann's Rangers is one of the country's oldest football institutions, the team only made their debut in the Professional Football League in 2006. In January 2019 under Interims Chairman Richard Fakoory, the club moved to La Horquetta, Arima and was refounded as La Horquetta Rangers as a phoenix club.

== Club honours ==
=== Cups and trophies ===
- FA Trophy
  - Runners-up (3): 1990, 1994, 1997
- TOYOTA Classic
  - Runners-up (2): 2006, 2008
- Digicel Pro Bowl
  - Runners-up (1): 2007
