= Manny Ramjohn Stadium =

Football stadium in Trinidad and Tobago

Mannie Ramjohn Stadium
- Interactive map of Mannie Ramjohn Stadium
- Location: Marabella, Trinidad
- Coordinates: 10°18′12″N 61°26′30″W
- Capacity: 10,000
- Surface: Grass

Construction
- Opened: 2001

Tenants
- FC South End; Ma Pau SC; Police FC; W Connection

The Mannie Ramjohn Stadium, located in Marabella, San Fernando, Trinidad and Tobago, is named for long-distance runner Manny Ramjohn, the first person to win a gold medal for Trinidad and Tobago in a major international sporting event. The stadium was constructed for the 2001 FIFA U-17 World Cup which was hosted by Trinidad and Tobago. It also hosted games from the 2010 FIFA U-17 Women's World Cup.
