= Ma Pau Stars S.C. =

Association football club in Trinidad and Tobago

Meu Pau Stars Sports Club
- Full name: Ma Pau Stars Sports Club
- Nickname: The Casino Boys
- Founded: 2007; 19 years ago
- Ground: Larry Gomes Stadium
- Chairman: Brian Bain
- Manager: Ross Russell
- League: TT Pro League
- 2016–17: TT Pro League, 4th

Ma Pau Stars S.C. is a professional football club from Trinidad and Tobago that began playing in the TT Pro League in 2016.
