= 2017 Trinidad and Tobago FA Trophy =

2017 FA Trophy
Trinidad and Tobago Cup

Tournament details
- Country: Trinidad and Tobago
- Teams: 64

Final positions
- Champions: W Connection
- Runners-up: Police

Tournament statistics
- Matches played: 63
- Goals scored: 207 (3.29 per match)

Awards
- Best player: Hector

The 2017 Trinidad and Tobago FA Trophy was the 86th season of the FA Trophy, which is the oldest football competition for teams in Trinidad and Tobago. North East Stars entered as the tournament's defending champion, who defeated W Connection 5–4 on penalties after a 0–0 in the 2014–15 final at Ato Boldon Stadium. The tournament began on 16 September with 64 teams competing in single elimination matches and will conclude with the final on 8 December. W Connection won their 5th FA Trophy after beating Police 3–1 in the final at the Ato Boldon Stadium.

== Qualification ==
The 2017–18 FA Trophy will involve all ten Pro League clubs, twenty Super League sides, six each from the Northern FA, Eastern FA, Central FA, Southern FA, and five from the Tobago FA and the Eastern Counties Football Union (ECFU).

The following clubs qualified for the 83rd edition of the FA Trophy:

| TT Pro League; 10 teams | National Super League; 20 teams | Regional FA Leagues; 34 teams | |
| Central; Club Sando; Defence Force; Morvant Caledonia United; North East Stars; Point Fortin Civic; Police; San Juan Jabloteh; St. Ann's Rangers; W Connection | 1976 FC Phoenix; Bethel United; Central 500 Spartans; Club Sando Moruga; Cunupia; Defence Force; FC Santa Rosa; Guaya United; Harlem Strikers; Marabella Family Crisis Centre; Perseverance Ball Runners; Petit Valley United; Police; Prisons; QPCC; Siparia Spurs; Stokely Vale; UTT; WASA; Youth Stars | Northern FA: Belmont; Cultural Roots; Malta Carib Alcons; RSSR; Step by Step Maple; St. Francois Nationals; Eastern FA: Creek SCC; F.C. Maloney; La Horquetta XF; Red Hill; Trinity Rangers; WASA; Central FA: Central Soccer World; Eagles; Fire Service; Harlem Strikers; Perseverance Ball Runners; Perseverance United | Southern FA: Erin; Pele Pele; Pitchmen; San Fernando Giants; Santa Flora; Serial Strikers; Tobago FA: Black Rock; Calder Hall; Goal City; Leeds; Signal Hill United; Eastern Counties Football Union: Biche United; D'Marie Hill Youths; Manzan United; Sangre Grande Dream Team; Tamana United |

== Schedule ==
The schedule for the 2017–18 FA Trophy, as announced by the Trinidad and Tobago Football Association:

| Round | Date | Matches | Clubs | New entries this round |
|---|---|---|---|---|
| Round of 64 | 16–17 September 2017 | 32 | 64 → 32 | 64 |
| Round of 32 | 1–5 October 2017 | 16 | 32 → 16 | |
| Round of 16 | 22–25 October 2017 | 8 | 16 → 8 | |
| Quarterfinals | 7–8 November 2017 | 4 | 8 → 4 | |
| Semifinals | 26 November | 2 | 4 → 2 | |
| Final | 17 December | 1 | 2 → 1 | |

== Results ==
All matches were played over two 45 minute halves, and in the process if the match were drawn at the end of regulation time, penalty kicks will decide the outcome.

=== Round of 64 ===
The draw for the most prestigious knockout tournament held by the Trinidad and Tobago Football Association was made on 22 August 2017 at its head office in the Ato Boldon Stadium with ties played on 16 and 17 of September 2017.

| 16 September 2017 | Central (PL) | 0–2 | Morvant Caledonia United (PL) | Port of Spain |
| 16:00 (UTC-4) | | Report | Holder 27'; Kareem Joseph 65' | Stadium: Hasely Crawford Stadium training field |

| 16 September 2017 | San Juan Jabloteh (PL) | 7–0 | La Horquetta XF (EFA) | Malabar |
| 16:00 (UTC-4) | Bonval 5', 27'; Noel 8'; Hutchinson 10'; Lombardo 33', 68'; Douglas 79' | Report | | Stadium: Larry Gomes Stadium |

| 16 September 2017 | Siparia Spurs (SL) | 1–5 | North East Stars (PL) | Palo Seco |
| 16:00 (UTC-4) | Teesdale 57' | Report | Jackson 69'; Felix 90'; George 43'; Grosvenor 83'; John 90+2' (pen.) | Stadium: Palo Seco Velodrome |

| 16 September 2017 | Eagles (CFA) | 1–1 (9–10 p) | Sangre Grande Dream Team (ECFU) | Enterprise |
| 16:00 (UTC-4) | | Report | | Stadium: Africa Ground |

| 16 September 2017 | D'Marie Hill Youths (ECFU) | 0–1 | Guaya United (SL) | Sangre Grande |
| 16:00 (UTC-4) | | Report | | Stadium: D'Marie Hill Recreation Ground |

| 16 September 2017 | Malta Carib Alcons (NFA) | 1–2 | UTT (SL) | O'Meara |
| 16:00 (UTC-4) | | Report | | Stadium: UTT Ground |

| 1 October 2017 | Fire Service (CFA) | 4–3 | Black Rock (TFA) | Chaguanas |
| 16:00 (UTC-4) | | Report | | Stadium: Woodford Lodge |

| 16 September 2017 | Manzan United (ECFU) | 0–1 | Prisons (SL) | Manzanilla |
| 16:00 (UTC-4) | | Report | | Stadium: Manzanilla Recreation Ground |

| 16 September 2017 | 1976 FC Phoenix (SL) | 2–1 | Goal City (TFA) | Bon Accord, Tobago |
| 17:00 (UTC-4) | | Report | | Stadium: Bon Accord Recreation Ground |

| 16 September 2017 | Perseverance Ball Runners (CFA) | 1–1 (7–6 p) | Erin (SFA) | Chaguanas |
| 16:00 (UTC-4) | | Report | | Stadium: New Settlement Ground |

| 16 September 2017 | Biche United (ECFU) | 2–2 (2–4 p) | Trinity Rangers (EFA) | Biche |
| 16:00 (UTC-4) | | Report | | Stadium: Biche Recreation Ground |

| 16 September 2017 | QPCC (SL) | 0–3 | FC Santa Rosa (SL) | Westmoorings |
| 16:00 (UTC-4) | | Report | | Stadium: St. Anthony's College Grounds |

| 16 September 2017 | Petit Valley United (SL) | 1–4 | Cunupia (SL) | Diego Martin |
| 16:00 (UTC-4) | | Report | | Stadium: Diego Martin North Secondary School Ground |

| 16 September 2017 | Central Soccer World (CFA) | 1–0 | Harlem Strikers (CFA) | Freeport |
| 16:00 (UTC-4) | | Report | | Stadium: St. Mary's Ground |

| 16 September 2017 | Calder Hall (TFA) | 2–3 | Bethel United (SL) | Mt. Pleasant, Tobago |
| 18:00 (UTC-4) | | Report | | Stadium: Mt. Pleasant Recreation Ground |

| 16 September 2017 | Serial Strikers (SFA) | 0–0 (4–5 p) | Pitchmen (SFA) | Penal |
| 16:00 (UTC-4) | | Report | | Stadium: Lachoos Road Recreation Facility |

| 17 September 2017 | W Connection (PL) | 12–0 | Tamana United (ECFU) | Couva |
| 17:00 (UTC-4) | Paul 4'; St. Prix 14', 18', 23'; Benjamin 15', 83'; Joseph 27', 30', 71'; Diaz 65'; Apai 78', 80' | Report | | Stadium: Ato Boldon Stadium |

| 17 September 2017 | St. Ann's Rangers (PL) | 1–0 | Perseverance Ball Runners (SL) | Saint Augustine |
| 16:00 (UTC-4) | Lansiquot 52' | Report | | Stadium: St. Augustine Secondary School Ground |

| 17 September 2017 | Cultural Roots (NFA) | 1–2 | Club Sando (PL) | Saint James |
| 16:30 (UTC-4) | 68' | Report | Trimmingham 8'; Redhead 38' | Stadium: Dibe Recreation Ground |

| 17 September 2017 | Red Hill (EFA) | 1–5 | Point Fortin Civic (PL) | Maloney |
| 16:00 (UTC-4) | Johnson 12' | Report | Mitchell 19', 49', 70'; Neptune 74'; Kesar 89' | Stadium: Maloney Recreation Ground |

| 17 September 2017 | Belmont (NFA) | 0–3 | Defence Force (PL) | Port of Spain |
| 17:00 (UTC-4) | | Report | Jorsling; Garica; Cooper | Stadium: Hasely Crawford Stadium training field |

| 17 September 2017 | WASA (SL) | 1–2 | Police (PL) | Saint Joseph |
| 17:00 (UTC-4) | Glasgow | Report | Freitas; Mc David 79' | Stadium: WASA Ground |

| 17 September 2017 | Santa Flora (SFA) | 1–0 | Harlem Strikers (SL) | Santa Flora |
| 16:00 (UTC-4) | Nathaniel 44' | Report | | Stadium: Santa Flora Ground |

| 17 September 2017 | RSSR (NFA) | 0–1 | Signal Hill United (TFA) | Port of Spain |
| 16:00 (UTC-4) | | Report | | Stadium: Hasely Crawford Stadium |

| 17 September 2017 | San Fernando Giants (SFA) | 2–1 | St. Francois Nationals (NFA) | Claxton Bay |
| 16:00 (UTC-4) | | Report | | Stadium: Union Recreation Ground |

| 17 September 2017 | Club Sando Moruga (SL) | 2–1 | Perseverance United (CFA) | Moruga |
| 16:00 (UTC-4) | | Report | | Stadium: Grand Chemin Recreation Ground |

| 17 September 2017 | Leeds (TFA) | 3–0; Awarded | Creek SCC (EFA) | Mt. Pleasant, Tobago |
| 16:00 (UTC-4) | | Report | | Stadium: Mt. Pleasant Recreation Ground |

| 17 September 2017 | Step by Step Maple (NFA) | 0–3; Awarded | Stokely Vale (SL) | Port of Spain |
| 15:30 (UTC-4) | | Report | | Stadium: Hasely Crawford Stadium training field |

| 17 September 2017 | Central 500 Spartans (SL) | 1–1 (5–4 p) | Marabella Family Crisis Centre (SL) | Chaguanas |
| 16:00 (UTC-4) | | Report | | Stadium: Edinburgh 500 Recreation Ground |

| 17 September 2017 | Defence Force (SL) | 3–0; Awarded | Youth Stars (SL) | Chaguaramas |
| 16:00 (UTC-4) | | Report | | Stadium: Defence Force Headquarters Ground |

| 17 September 2017 | Pele Pele (SFA) | 0–3; Awarded | Police (SL) | La Brea |
| 16:00 (UTC-4) | | Report | | Stadium: La Brea Recreation Facility |

| 17 September 2017 | WASA (EFA) | 1–0 | F.C. Maloney (EFA) | Saint Joseph |
| 15:00 (UTC-4) | Hosine 80' | Report | | Stadium: WASA Ground |

=== Round of 32 ===
The matches of the Round of 32 are as follows and will be played from 1 to 5 October 2017.

| 1 October 2017 | Central 500 Spartans (SL) | 4–1 | Perseverance Ball Runners (CFA) | Chaguanas |
| 18:00 (UTC-4) | Peters 33'; Grazette 44'; Lewis 81'; James 87' | Report | Jones 90+2' | Stadium: Edinburgh 500 Recreation Ground |

| 4 October 2017 | Police (PL) | 3–1 | UTT (SL) | Saint James |
| 18:00 (UTC-4) | Perry 6', 68', 76' | Report | Glen 9' | Stadium: Police Barracks Ground |

| 5 October 2017 | FC Santa Rosa (SL) | 3–1 | Santa Flora (SFA) | Arima |
| 15:45 (UTC-4) | Mitchell 20'; Stewart 66'; Cornwall 90+1' | Report | Taylor 54' | Stadium: Arima Velodrome |

| 1 October 2017 | Morvant Caledonia United (PL) | 1–1 (4–3 p) | Stokely Vale (SL) | Port of Spain |
| 15:30 (UTC-4) | Holder | Report | Walters | Stadium: Hasely Crawford Stadium |

| 5 October 2017 | Cunupia (SL) | 8–0 | Central Soccer World (CFA) | Port of Spain |
| 18:30 (UTC-4) | Mitchell 8'; Valley 23'; Woodley 27', 32', 57' (pen.), 70'; Legall 45'; Roberts 55' | Report | | Stadium: Hasely Crawford Stadium training field |

| 4 October 2017 | W Connection (PL) | 3–0 | Bethel United (SL) | Marabella |
| 15:45 (UTC-4) | St. Prix 41'; Diaz 51'; Apai 85' | Report | | Stadium: Mannie Ramjohn Stadium |

| 1 October 2017 | Defence Force (PL) | 10–0 | Trinity Rangers (EFA) | Marabella |
| 15:45 (UTC-4) | Jorsling 9' (pen.), 24' (pen.), 27' (pen.), 45', 80'; Arcia 31', 83', 84'; Serrette 42'; Sebro 55' | Report | | Stadium: Mannie Ramjohn Stadium |

| 5 October 2017 | St. Ann's Rangers (PL) | 3–0 | Fire Service (CFA) | Saint Augustine |
| 16:00 (UTC-4) | Lansiquot 32'; Donald 39' (pen.); Gerard Mitchell 80' | Report | | Stadium: St. Augustine Secondary School Ground |

| 4 October 2017 | Prisons (SL) | 1–4 | 1976 FC Phoenix (SL) | Arouca |
| 15:45 (UTC-4) | Thomas 2' | Report | Kerr 24'; Douglas 69'; Noray 80'; Williams 83' | Stadium: Youth Training Centre |

| 4 October 2017 | San Juan Jabloteh (PL) | 1–2 | Defence Force (SL) | Barataria |
| 17:00 (UTC-4) | Simpson 18' | Report | Edwards 33', 72' | Stadium: Barataria Recreational Ground |

| 4 October 2017 | Club Sando Moruga (SL) | 6–3 | Sangre Grande Dream Team (ECFU) | Moruga |
| 16:00 (UTC-4) | London 27', 41', 61'; Julien 29', 33', 83' | Report | Charles 36'; Sample 58'; Parris 65' (pen.) | Stadium: Grand Chemin Recreation Ground |

| 4 October 2017 | San Fernando Giants (SFA) | 0–1 | Police (SL) | Point Fortin |
| 19:00 (UTC-4) | | Report | Boodram 85' | Stadium: Mahaica Oval |

| 1 October 2017 | Pitchmen (SFA) | 2–4 | North East Stars (PL) | La Brea |
| 19:00 (UTC-4) | Alleyne 79', 81' | Report | Seecharan 6'; Baptiste 19'; Francois 23'; Abraham 84' | Stadium: La Brea Recreation Ground |

| 5 October 2017 | Club Sando (PL) | 1–1 (5–6 p) | Guaya United (SL) | Marabella |
| 15:30 (UTC-4) | Joel Russell 18' | Report | Jagdeosingh 18' | Stadium: Mannie Ramjohn Stadium |

| 1 October 2017 | Point Fortin Civic (PL) | 3–0; Awarded | Signal Hill United (TFA) | Point Fortin |
| 16:00 (UTC-4) | | Report | | Stadium: Mahaica Oval |

| 1 October 2017 | Leeds (TFA) | 1–2 | WASA (EFA) | Plymouth, Tobago |
| 17:00 (UTC-4) | Brathwaite 67' | Report | Harley 11'; Celestine 73' | Stadium: Plymouth Recreation Ground |

=== Round of 16 ===
The draws for the Round of 16 are as follows. Morvant Caledonia United made another leap towards a fourth FA Trophy by ousting fellow Pro League compatriots and defending champions North East Stars 4–1 on penalties following a 1–1 draw in one of six Round-of-16 clashes contested on Sunday. Connection, four-time former champions, edged Super League's Cunupia FC 3–2 in a fiery contest that saw three red cards, a missed penalty, a converted penalty, and a “Showtime” double at the Mannie Ramjohn Stadium. But six-time former champions Defence Force, led by an uninterrupted hat-trick from Trinidad and Tobago attacking midfielder Hashim Arcia, made light work of Central 500 Spartans, trashing the Super League outfit 5–1 at Barataria Oval. Three-time former champions, Police FC, left it late against WASA FC's Eastern Football Association (EFA) side for a 2–1 win through goals by Elijah Belgrave and Kenaz Williams 89th and 92nd minutes to overturn a one-goal deficit at WASA Ground in St. Joseph after Theo Hosein had given the hosts the lead on 59 minutes. Elsewhere, Jabari Mitchell and Shaquille Dublin scored on either side of the break to earn 1969 champions Point Fortin Civic a 2–0 win over Police FC's Super League side at Police Barracks in St. James.

| 22 October 2017 | Morvant Caledonia United (PL) | 1–1 (4–1 p) | North East Stars (PL) | Port of Spain |
| 15:30 (UTC-4) | Benjamin 61' | Report | George 29' | Stadium: Hasely Crawford Stadium |

| 22 October 2017 | W Connection (PL) | 3–2 | Cunupia (SL) | Marabella |
| 15:30 (UTC-4) | Diaz 7'; Apai 53'; Jones 71' | Report | Woodley 69' (pen.), 75' | Stadium: Mannie Ramjohn Stadium |

| 22 October 2017 | Club Sando Moruga (SL) | 2–2 (3–1 p) | St. Ann's Rangers (PL) | Moruga |
| 15:30 (UTC-4) | Louison 43'; Julien 56' | Report | Selby 13'; Hilbert 27' | Stadium: Grand Chemin Recreation Ground |

| 22 October 2017 | Police (SL) | 0–2 | Point Fortin Civic (PL) | Saint James |
| 15:30 (UTC-4) | | Report | Mitchell 15'; Dublin 85' | Stadium: Police Barracks Ground |

| 22 October 2017 | WASA (EFA) | 1–2 | Police (PL) | Saint Joseph |
| 16:30 (UTC-4) | Hosein 59' | Report | Belgrave 89'; Williams 90+2' | Stadium: WASA Ground |

| 22 October 2017 | Defence Force (PL) | 5–1 | Central 500 Spartans (SL) | Barataria |
| 16:00 (UTC-4) | Arcia 11', 39', 51'; Gonzales 82'; Morris 90' | Report | Derrick 62' | Stadium: Barataria Recreational Ground |

| 25 October 2017 | Defence Force (SL) | Unknown | Guaya United (SL) | Barataria |
| 18:00 (UTC-4) | | Report | | Stadium: Barataria Recreational Ground |

Result unknown but Guaya United advanced

| 25 October 2017 | 1976 FC Phoenix (SL) | Unknown | FC Santa Rosa (SL) | Canaan, Tobago |
| 17:00 (UTC-4) | | Report | | Stadium: Canaan Recreation Ground |

Result unknown but 1976 Phoenix advanced

=== Quarterfinals ===
Former champions Morvant Caledonia United and Police FC, both of the Pro League, have booked their places into the 2017 FA Trophy semi-final round which is tentatively set November 26.

Morvant Caledonia edged Super League side Club Sando Moruga 1-0 courtesy Kareem Joseph's late converted penalty before Police rallied from a goal down to beat rivals Defence Force 3–1 to complete the first quarter-final double-header at the Hasely Crawford Stadium training field on Tuesday afternoon. Neil Benjamin Jr. scored his 15th goal in all competitions this season to lift W Connection to a 1–0 win over Super League side Guaya United on Wednesday night to complete the last four of the 2017 FA Trophy.

Connection, FA champions of 1999, 2000, 2002 and 2013–14, joined Pro League compatriots and former champions Morvant Caledonia United and Police FC, and 1976 FC Phoenix—the last remaining team of 19 Super League clubs that were part of the competition this season—into the semi-final round which is expected to be contested on November 26.

| 7 November 2017 | Club Sando Moruga (SL) | 0–1 | Morvant Caledonia United (PL) | Port of Spain |
| 16:00 (UTC-4) | | Report | Joseph 90' (pen.) | Stadium: Hasely Crawford Stadium training field |

| 7 November 2017 | Police (PL) | 3–1 | Defence Force (PL) | Port of Spain |
| 18:15 (UTC-4) | Ryan 56' (pen.); Belgrave 88'; Leach 90+5' | Report | Sebro 46' | Stadium: Hasely Crawford Stadium training field |

| 8 November 2017 | Point Fortin Civic (PL) | 0–2 | 1976 FC Phoenix (SL) | Port of Spain |
| 16:00 (UTC-4) | | Report | Noray 2', 51' (pen.) | Stadium: Hasely Crawford Stadium training field |

| 8 November 2017 | Guaya United (SL) | 0–1 | W Connection (PL) | Port of Spain |
| 18:15 (UTC-4) | | Report | Benjamin 79' | Stadium: Hasely Crawford Stadium training field |

=== Semifinals ===
W Connection and Police FC have set up an all-Pro League final of the 2017 FA Trophy on December 17 after comfortable semi-final wins yesterday over Tobago's 1976 FC Phoenix, 3–0, and Morvant Caledonia United, 5–1, respectively, at Ato Boldon Stadium.

Neil Benjamin Jr. put four-time champions Connection ahead in just the fourth minute of the semi-final one against Phoenix before veteran attacker Hughtun Hector (26’) and Suriname forward Dimitri Apai (75’) sent the Tobagonians packing.

Later, Kareem Freitas scored a hat-trick, netting in the 19th, 54th and 84th minutes at the Couva venue, interrupted by the break and a double from teammate Elijah Belgrave (47th & 51st minutes) to as the Lawmen dispatched three-time former champions Morvant Caledonia, who grabbed a consolation item in the 90th minute through Sedale Mc Lean.

| 26 November 2017 | W Connection (PL) | 3–0 | 1976 FC Phoenix (SL) | Couva |
| 16:00 (UTC-4) | Benjamin 4'; Hector 26'; Apai 75' | Report | | Stadium: Ato Boldon Stadium |

| 26 November 2017 | Police (PL) | 5–1 | Morvant Caledonia United (PL) | Couva |
| 18:15 (UTC-4) | Freitas 19', 54', 84'; Belgrave 47', 51' | Report | Mc Lean 90' | Stadium: Ato Boldon Stadium |

=== Final ===
W Connection celebrated a fifth FA Trophy, reuniting with the title they last won in 2014 after defeating 10-men Police FC 3-1 last night at the Home of Football, Ato Boldon Stadium in Couva to bring down the curtain on the 2017 season for top-flight clubs.

Veteran midfielder Hughtun Hector scored late on either side of the break to finish with a double and the eventual MVP award after Suriname international Dimitri Apai opened the 2017 final scoring for coach Stuart Charles-Fevrier's men.

“It’s a great feeling; a Christmas feeling, to come away champions,” said W Connection assistant coach Earl Jean after his team were crowned the $100,000 2017 FA Trophy champions.

| 8 December 2017 | W Connection (PL) | 3–1 | Police (PL) | Couva |
| 20:00 (UTC-4) | Apai 32'; Hector 45', 90' | Report | Perry 67' | Stadium: Ato Boldon Stadium; Referee: Crystal Sobers |
