= 2012–13 Trinidad and Tobago FA Trophy =

2012–13 FA Trophy
Trinidad and Tobago Cup

Tournament details
- Country: Trinidad and Tobago
- Teams: 36

Final positions
- Champions: Caledonia AIA
- Runners-up: Central FC

Tournament statistics
- Matches played: 35
- Goals scored: 134 (3.83 per match)
- Top goal scorer: Marcus Joseph (7 goals)

The 2012–13 Trinidad and Tobago FA Trophy was the 83rd season of the FA Trophy, which is the oldest football competition for teams in Trinidad and Tobago. Caledonia AIA entered as the tournament's defending champion, who defeated Defence Force 1–0 in the 2011–12 final at Manny Ramjohn Stadium. The tournament began on 5 December 2012 with 36 teams competing in single elimination matches and concluded on 1 March 2013 with the crowning of the cup winners.

== Qualification ==
The tournament features teams from the top three levels of the football pyramid. These three levels and 9 leagues, namely the TT Pro League, National Super League, Central FA's Premier Division, Eastern FA's Premier Division, Eastern Counties' Football Union, Northern FA's Premier Division, Southern FA's Premier Division, Tobago FA's Premier Division, and the Secondary School Football League each have their own separate qualification process to trim their ranks down to their final team delegations.

All eight teams from the TT Pro League entered the competition. The top six following the 2012 National Super League season also met qualification. In addition, all six regional football associations were awarded three qualification positions and four teams qualified from the Secondary Schools Football League.

The following clubs qualified for the 83rd edition of the FA Trophy:

TT Pro League; 8 teams	National Super League; 6 teams	Regional FA Leagues; 18 teams		Secondary School Football League; 4 teams
Caledonia AIA; Central FC; Defence Force; North East Stars; Police; St. Ann's Rangers; T&TEC; W Connection	1.FC Santa Rosa; Eagles United; Westside Super Starz; Joe Public; Stokely Vale; WASA	Central FA – Premier Division: Cunupia; Edinburgh 500; Enterprise Youths; Eastern FA – Premier Division: Malabar; La Horquetta SA; Joe Public; Eastern Counties – Football Union: Guaya United; Mathura United; Valencia United	Northern FA – Premier Division: Queen's Park; Police; Petit Valley United; Southern FA – Premier Division: Point Fortin Civic; OJ's Soldado All-Stars; Marabella Family Crisis Centre; Tobago FA – Premier Division: Roxborough Lakers; Hills United; Youth Stars	Carapichaima East Secondary; Shiva Boys' Hindu College; Scarborough Secondary; St. Anthony's College

== Schedule ==
The schedule for the 2012–13 FA Trophy, as announced by the Trinidad and Tobago Football Association:

Round	Date	Matches	Clubs	New entries this round
First round	5 December 2012	4	36 → 32	8: 29th–36th
Second round	12 December 2012	16	32 → 16	28: 1st–28th
Third round	19 December 2012	8	16 → 8	
Quarterfinals	9 January 2013	4	8 → 4	
Semifinals	16 January 2013	2	4 → 2	
Final	1 March 2013	1	2 → 1	

== Results ==
All matches were played over two 45 minute halves, and in the process if the match were drawn at the end of regulation time, then two additional 15-minute halves were used, and if necessary, penalty kicks if still drawn after extra time.

=== First round ===
The draw for the most prestigious knockout tournament held by the Trinidad and Tobago Football Association was made on 30 November 2012 at its head office in Port of Spain, Trinidad with ties played in the week beginning 3 December 2012. The only Pro League match-up featured W Connection facing North East Stars in the opening match of the FA Trophy. The remaining 28 teams after the random draw were given byes into the second round. North East Stars came from a goal behind in the final eight minutes of the match with W Connection to win 2–1 over their Pro League opponent with goals from Kaydion Gabriel and Elijah Manners. The other teams to advance into the draw for the second round include Point Fortin Civic, La Horquetta SA, and Marabella Family Crisis Centre.

5 December 2012	Point Fortin Civic (3)	7–2	WASA (2)	Point Fortin, Trinidad
15:30 (UTC-4)	M. Joseph 19', 29', 68'; Alexis 21', 42'; Cave 70', 90'	Report	Walker 66'; Noray 85'	Stadium: Mahaica Oval Pavilion

5 December 2012	Carapichaima East Secondary (4)	1–2	Marabella Family Crisis Centre (3)	Carapichaima, Trinidad
15:30 (UTC-4)	Holder 31'	Report	Jordan 4'; Campbell 85'	Stadium: Carapichaima East Ground

5 December 2012	La Horquetta SA (3)	3–1	Police (3)	La Horquetta, Trinidad
17:00 (UTC-4)	Robinson 3'; Barbour 52'; Jackson 90'	Report	Elliot 10'	Stadium: La Horquetta Recreation Ground

5 December 2012	W Connection (1)	1–2	North East Stars (1)	Couva, Trinidad
18:00 (UTC-4)	Winchester 55'	Report	Gabriel 83'; Manners 86' (pen.)	Stadium: Ato Boldon Stadium

=== Second round ===
The draw for the second round took place on 7 December 2012 and involved the four winning teams from the first round and the remaining 28 teams that received byes into the second round. These were from the following levels:

- 7 from Level 1 (TT Pro League)
- 5 from Level 2 (National Super League)
- 17 from Level 3 (Regional Football Association Leagues)
- 3 from the Secondary Schools Football League

Matches in the second round were played in the week commencing 10 December 2012. The defending champions, Caledonia AIA, entered the competition in the second round to easily defeat Northern FA's Petit Valley United 8–0 with a second-half hat-trick from Trevin Caesar to advance into the third round draw. Shiva Boys' Hindu College was one of the surprises of the round after the Shiva Boys defeated Eagles United from the National Super League 7–6 on penalties after the match ended in a 3–3 draw. Stokely Vale continued their giant-killing from the 2012 TOYOTA Classic after they won 3–2 over St. Ann's Rangers from the TT Pro League.

12 December 2012	Scarborough Secondary (4)	0–1	Enterprise Youths (3)	Plymouth, Tobago
15:30 (UTC-4)		Report	Sobers 23'	Stadium: Plymouth Recreation Ground

12 December 2012	Petit Valley United (3)	0–8	Caledonia AIA (1)	Diego Martin, Trinidad
15:30 (UTC-4)		Report	Holder 2'; Armstrong 8', 52'; Bobb 12', 38'; Caesar 48', 51', 75'	Stadium: Diego Martin Secondary Ground

12 December 2012	St. Anthony's College (4)	0–2	1.FC Santa Rosa (2)	Westmoorings, Trinidad
15:30 (UTC-4)		Report	Alleyne 42'; Durant 60'	Stadium: St. Anthony's Ground

12 December 2012	Shiva Boys (4)	3–3 (7–6 p)	Eagles United (2)	Penal, Trinidad
15:30 (UTC-4)	Felix 12'; Reberio 54'; García 67'	Report	Glasgow 22', 47', 87'	Stadium: David Williams Recreation Ground

12 December 2012	Mathura United (3)	3–3 (4–2 p)	Valencia United (3)	Mathura, Trinidad
15:30 (UTC-4)		Report		Stadium: Mathura Recreation Ground

12 December 2012	Guaya United (3)	2–3	Point Fortin Civic (3)	La Savane, Trinidad
15:30 (UTC-4)	Stewart 34' (pen.); Jones 73'	Report	M. Joseph 18', 53'; S. Joseph 26'	Stadium: New Lands Recreation Ground

12 December 2012	T&TEC (1)	3–0	Edinburgh 500 (3)	San Fernando, Trinidad
16:00 (UTC-4)	Benito 25', 41'; Bass 59'	Report		Stadium: Skinner Park

12 December 2012	Hills United (3)	1–3	Cunupia (3)	Goodwood Park, Trinidad
16:00 (UTC-4)	Stewart 31'	Report	James 37', 48', 75'	Stadium: Goodwood Recreation Ground

12 December 2012	OJ's Soldado All-Stars (3)	4–3	La Horquetta SA (3)	Siparia, Trinidad
17:00 (UTC-4)	Ettienne 8', 20', 78'; Griffith 89'	Report	Robinson 18'; Elcock 34'; Charles 60'	Stadium: Cedros Recreation Ground

12 December 2012	Defence Force (1)	8–0	Queen's Park (3)	Mucurapo, Trinidad
17:00 (UTC-4)	Belgrave 20', 26'; Edwards 59', 83', 90'; Balthazar 61'; Sebro 67'; Joseph 88'	Report		Stadium: Hasely Crawford Stadium

12 December 2012	Stokely Vale (2)	3–2	St. Ann's Rangers (1)	Plymouth, Tobago
17:30 (UTC-4)	Joseph 15', 64'; Winchester 33'	Report	Modeste 7', 26'	Stadium: Plymouth Recreation Ground

12 December 2012	Central FC (1)	3–2	Malabar (3)	Couva, Trinidad
18:00 (UTC-4)	Harris 22'; Glen 67', 83' (pen.), 93' (pen.)	Report	Morris 14'; Stoute 44'; Samuel 48' (pen.)	Stadium: Ato Boldon Stadium

12 December 2012	North East Stars (1)	5–0	Westside Superstarz (2)	Mucurapo, Trinidad
19:00 (UTC-4)	Gabriel 14', 65'; Thomas 29'; Manners 82'; Joseph 90+'	Report		Stadium: Hasely Crawford Stadium

13 December 2012	Joe Public (3)	5–1	Youth Stars (3)	Macoya, Trinidad
15:30 (UTC-4)	Morris 52'; Osbourne 62'; Reid 70'; Wyllie 79'; Julien 87'	Report	Rogers 23'	Stadium: Marvin Lee Stadium

13 December 2012	Joe Public (2)	3–1	Marabella Family Crisis Centre (3)	Macoya, Trinidad
17:30 (UTC-4)	Goodridge 21'; Derrick 55'; Jordan 88'	Report	Martin 41'	Stadium: Marvin Lee Stadium

13 December 2012	Roxborough Lakers (3)	w/o	Police (1)	Plymouth, Tobago
18:00 (UTC-4)				Stadium: Plymouth Recreation Ground

=== Third round ===
The draw for the third round took place on 14 December 2012 and involved the 16 winning teams from the second round. These were from the following levels:

- 6 from Level 1 (TT Pro League)
- 3 from Level 2 (National Super League)
- 6 from Level 3 (2 CFA Premier Division, 1 EFA Premier Division, 1 Eastern Counties Football Union, 2 SFA Premier Division)
- 1 from the Secondary Schools Football League (Shiva Boys' Hindu College)

Matches in the third round will be played in the week commencing 17 December 2012. After having eliminated WASA and Guaya United in the first and second rounds, respectively, Point Fortin Civic knocked off another club from the Super League with a 2–0 win over Joe Public to advance into the quarterfinals. However, the surprise of the round again came from Stokely Vale who picked off their second successive Pro League club when they shocked Defence Force 2–1 at Hasely Crawford Stadium. In the lone all-Pro League encounter, Central FC defeated Police with a 2–1 comeback win using goals from Anthony Wolfe and Darryl Trim to propel The Sharks into the last eight. Caledonia AIA narrowly defeated Joe Public of the Eastern FA Premier Division by a scoreline of 1–0.

19 December 2012	Point Fortin Civic (3)	2–0	Joe Public (2)	Point Fortin, Trinidad
15:30 (UTC-4)	M. Joseph 77'; S. Joseph 90' (pen.)	Report		Stadium: Mahaica Oval Pavilion

19 December 2012	T&TEC (1)	3–1	Enterprise Youths (3)	Marabella, Trinidad
16:00 (UTC-4)	Peters 7'; Bass 57', 87'	Report	Frederick 20'	Stadium: Manny Ramjohn Stadium

19 December 2012	Mathura United (3)	2–3	Cunupia (3)	Mathura, Trinidad
16:00 (UTC-4)	Charles 9'; Nathaniel 23'	Report	James 5'; Spencer 45'; Noel 49'	Stadium: Mathura Recreation Ground

19 December 2012	Defence Force (1)	1–2	Stokely Vale (2)	Mucurapo, Trinidad
17:00 (UTC-4)	Jorsling 57'	Report	Winchester 2'; McDougall 52'	Stadium: Hasely Crawford Stadium

19 December 2012	OJ's Saldado All-Stars (3)	3–3 (0–3 p)	Shiva Boys (4)	La Brea, Trinidad
17:00 (UTC-4)	Ettienne 39'; Sherwood 51'; Burgess 79'	Report	Weston 32', 44', 74'	Stadium: La Brea Recreation Ground

19 December 2012	Caledonia AIA (1)	1–0	Joe Public (3)	Maracas, Trinidad
18:00 (UTC-4)	David 75'	Report		Stadium: Maracas Recreation Ground

19 December 2012	Central FC (1)	2–1	Police (1)	Couva, Trinidad
18:00 (UTC-4)	Wolfe 51'; Trim 62'	Report	Perry 15'	Stadium: Ato Boldon Stadium

19 December 2012	1.FC Santa Rosa (2)	0–2	North East Stars (1)	Couva, Trinidad
20:00 (UTC-4)		Report	Glasgow 36'; Mitchell 52'	Stadium: Ato Boldon Stadium

=== Quarterfinals ===
The draw for the quarterfinals took place on 20 December 2012 and involved the eight winning teams from the third round. The lowest ranked teams left in the competition were Cunupia of the Central FA Premier Division and Point Fortin Civic of the Southern FA Premier Division, both from the third tier of Trinidad and Tobago football, and Shiva Boys' Hindu College of the Secondary Schools Football League. The eight remaining teams were from the following levels:

- 4 from Level 1 (TT Pro League)
- 1 from Level 2 (Stokely Vale of the National Super League)
- 2 from Level 3 (Cunupia of the Central FA Premier Division and Point Fortin Civic of the Southern FA Premier Division)
- 1 from the Secondary Schools Football League (Shiva Boys' Hindu College)

Matches in the quarterfinals will be played on 9 January 2013. Central FC eased into the semifinals with a 2–0 win over Shiva Boys with goals from Tyrone Charles and Quincy Charles. The other two quarterfinal matches were decided on penalty kicks with T&TEC and North East Stars respective victors over Point Fortin Civic and Cunupia. The remaining quarterfinal match between Caledonia AIA and Stokely Vale was postponed until 16 January 2013 due to the absence of match officials. The Stallions from Morvant/Laventille came away with a narrow 1–0 victory in Plymouth, Tobago with a 55th-minute goal from Sheldon Holder.

9 January 2013	Point Fortin Civic (3)	1–1 (1–3 p)	T&TEC (1)	Point Fortin, Trinidad
15:30 (UTC-4)	M. Joseph 36'	Report	Benito 85' (pen.)	Stadium: Mahaica Oval Pavilion

9 January 2013	Cunupia (3)	1–1 (2–4 p)	North East Stars (1)	Woodford Lodge, Trinidad
18:00 (UTC-4)	King 11'	Report	Gomez 7'	Stadium: Hugo Francis Recreation Ground

9 January 2013	Central FC (1)	2–0	Shiva Boys (4)	Couva, Trinidad
18:00 (UTC-4)	T. Charles 78'; Q. Charles 88'	Report		Stadium: Ato Boldon Stadium

16 January 2013	Stokely Vale (2)	0–1	Caledonia AIA (1)	Plymouth, Tobago
17:00 (UTC-4)		Report	Holder 55'	Stadium: Plymouth Recreation Ground

=== Semifinals ===
The draw for the semifinals took place at the Trinidad and Tobago Football Association office in Woodbrook on 11 January 2013. The four remaining teams consisted of clubs from the Pro League (1) which included Caledonia AIA, Central FC, North East Stars, and T&TEC. The first semifinal match was contested at Ato Boldon Stadium between Central FC and T&TEC on 16 January 2013. At Hasely Crawford Stadium, Caledonia AIA faced North East Stars in the second semifinal.

In the first semifinal match, Central FC secured a place in the club's first FA Trophy final following a 1–0 win over fellow Pro League club T&TEC at Ato Boldon Stadium. Marvin Oliver grabbed the winner for the Sharks in the 76th minute. In the other semifinal, Caledonia AIA came from a one-goal deficit to defeat North East Stars 2–1 with goals from Sheldon Holder in the 69th minute and ten minutes later from substitute Sherron Joseph.

16 January 2013	Central FC (1)	1–0	T&TEC (1)	Couva, Trinidad
18:00 (UTC-4)	Oliver 76'	Report		Stadium: Ato Boldon Stadium

24 January 2013	North East Stars (1)	1–2	Caledonia AIA (1)	Couva, Trinidad
18:00 (UTC-4)	Manners 47'	Report	Holder 69'; Joseph 79'	Stadium: Ato Boldon Stadium

=== Final ===
The final will be contested on 1 March 2013 at a venue to be announced. The match featured Pro League newcomers Central FC, who defeated T&TEC 1–0 in the first semifinal match, and the defending FA Trophy winners Caledonia AIA who defeated North East Stars 2–1 in the second semifinal. Caledonia AIA successfully defended their FA Trophy title with a win over Central FC 2–0 with goals on either side of the half. Keyon Edwards scored the game winner in the 32nd minute for the Stallions of Morvant/Laventille with another goal from Akim Armstrong to secure the win. The leading goal scorer of the tournament was Marcus Joseph of Point Fortin Civic, who ended the competition with seven goals and led his team to an appearance in the quarterfinals.

1 March 2013	Central FC (1)	0–2	Caledonia AIA (1)	Couva, Trinidad
18:00 (UTC-4)		Report	Edwards 32'; Armstrong 69'	Stadium: Ato Boldon Stadium; Referee: Neal Brizan
