= 2017 TT Super League =

The 2017 TT Super League season is the inaugural season under the title of the TT Super League and the fifteenth season for second tier association football clubs in Trinidad and Tobago, since its establishment in 2003. The league comprises 19 teams playing in two divisions. 12 teams play in League 1 and 7 teams play in League 2. League 1 began on June 11, 2017 and ended on December 10, 2017 with the crowning of Guaya United as champions. League 2 began on June 24, 2017 and ended on September 30, 2017 with the crowning of Petit Valley/Diego Martin United as champions.

== League 1 ==
League 1
- Season: 2017
- Champions: Guaya United
- Relegated: Bethel United; Siparia Spurs
- Matches played: 132
- Top goalscorer: Carlon Hughes 30 goals

=== Stadia and locations ===
Location of the 2017 TT Super League teams

Team	Location	Stadium
1976 Phoenix	Canaan	Canaan and Bon Accord Recreation Grounds
Bethel United	Bethel	Montgomery Recreation Ground
Club Sando Moruga	Moruga	Grand Chemin Recreation Ground
Cunupia	Cunupia	Larry Gomes Stadium
Defence Force	Chaguaramas	Defence Force Sports Field
Guaya United	Guayaguayare	New Lands Recreation Ground
Police	Saint James	St. James Barracks
QPCC	Port of Spain	Hasely Crawford Stadium
Santa Rosa	Arima	Arima Velodrome
Siparia Spurs	Palo Seco	Palo Seco Recreation Ground
UTT	O'Meara	UTT Campus Ground
WASA	Saint Joseph	WASA Ground

=== League table ===
Pos	Team	Pld	W	D	L	GF	GA	GD	Pts	Relegation
1	Guaya United (C)	22	16	4	2	67	25	+42	52	
2	Santa Rosa	22	16	2	4	52	16	+36	50	
3	Cunupia	22	13	4	5	48	32	+16	43	
4	1976 Phoenix	22	11	4	7	43	33	+10	37	
5	UTT	22	11	3	8	41	37	+4	36	
6	QPCC	22	9	5	8	36	35	+1	32	
7	Defence Force	22	9	4	9	43	41	+2	31	
8	WASA	22	8	6	8	36	39	−3	30	
9	Police	22	5	5	12	27	46	−19	20	
10	Club Sando Moruga	22	5	4	13	43	53	−10	19	
11	Bethel United (R)	22	3	4	15	22	58	−36	13	Relegation to 2018 League 2
11	Siparia Spurs (R)	22	2	3	17	20	63	−43	9	Relegation to 2018 League 2

Updated to match(es) played on March 11, 2018. Source:
Rules for classification: 1) points; 2) goal difference; 3) number of goals scored.
(C) Champions; (R) Relegated

=== Matches 1–22 ===
Home \ Away	1PH	BEU	CSM	CUN	DEF	GUA	POL	QPC	SAR	SIS	UTT	WAS
1976 Phoenix		2–2	2–1	1–2	2–2	5–3	1–1	3–0	0–0	4–1	2–0	3–2
Bethel United	0–4		3–0	0–2	1–3	0–3	0–0	1–0	0–4	3–0	0–3	1–2
Club Sando Moruga	1–2	2–2		2–3	6–2	1–0	7–1	3–4	1–3	0–0	2–2	5–0
Cunupia	2–0	3–1	5–1		3–2	0–0	4–3	3–2	1–2	0–1	1–1	2–2
Defence Force	1–3	6–0	2–2	0–1		2–3	2–1	1–3	0–1	3–1	2–0	3–2
Guaya United	3–1	7–0	3–1	6–2	6–1		3–1	1–0	2–0	5–1	5–0	4–2
Police	1–2	3–3	2–1	1–0	0–2	2–2		1–2	0–4	3–0	2–0	2–3
QPCC	2–1	3–1	2–0	3–3	1–3	0–0	2–1		1–1	1–0	0–1	2–3
Santa Rosa	3–0	2–0	7–0	2–0	0–2	1–3	1–0	4–1		5–1	0–1	2–0
Siparia Spurs	0–3	3–2	1–2	0–7	2–2	2–4	1–2	0–3	2–5		1–2	0–0
University of Trinidad and Tobago	4–2	2–1	3–2	2–3	2–1	1–2	6–0	3–3	1–2	4–3		2–1
WASA	2–0	4–1	4–3	0–1	1–1	2–2	0–0	1–1	0–3	3–0	2–1	

Updated to match(es) played on 12 March 2018. Source:
Legend: Blue = home team win; Yellow = draw; Red = away team win.

=== Top scorers ===
Rank	Player	Club	Goals
1	Carlon Hughes	Guaya United	30
2	Rashad Griffith	Santa Rosa	14
2	Devon Modeste	QPCC	14
4	Keron Clarke	Santa Rosa	13
4	Glen Walker	WASA	13
6	Michael Darko	Cunupia	11
7	Stevon Stoute	Cunupia	10
7	Kevon Woodley	Cunupia	10
7	Andell Noray	1976 Phoenix	10
10	Nathan Julien	Santa Rosa	9

=== Top assists ===
Rank	Player	Club	Assists
1	Andy London	Club Sando Moruga	9
2	Isaiah Mejias	UTT	8
3	Dexter Thornhill	Defence Force	7
3	Jody Allsop	Guaya United	7
3	Kevon Woodley	Cunupia	7
6	Stevon Stoute	Cunupia	6
6	Leroy Jones	Guaya United	6
8	Kevin Jagdeosingh	Guaya United	5
8	Jesse Rampersad	Santa Rosa	5
8	Jamal Goodridge	Defence Force	5

== League 2 ==
League 2
- Season: 2017
- Champions: Petit Valley/Diego Martin United
- Promoted: Petit Valley/Diego Martin United; Prisons
- Matches played: 42
- Top goalscorer: Donovan Derrick; Kevon Woodley 8 goals

=== Stadia and locations ===
Location of the 2017 TT Super League teams

Club	Location	Stadium
Central 500 Spartans	Chaguanas	Edinburgh 500 Recreation Ground
Harlem Strikers	Frederick Settlement	Frederick Settlement Recreation Ground
Marabella FCC	Marabella	Guaracara Park
Perseverance Ball Runners	New Settlement	New Settlement Recreation Ground
Petit Valley/Diego Martin United	Diego Martin	Diego Martin North Secondary School Ground
Prisons	Arouca, Trinidad and Tobago	Youth Training Centre
Youth Stars	Roxborough	Roxborough Complex

=== League table ===
Pos	Team	Pld	W	D	L	GF	GA	GD	Pts	Promotion
1	Petit Valley/Diego Martin United (C, P)	12	7	2	3	27	14	+13	23	Promoted to 2018 League 1
2	Prisons (P)	12	7	1	4	23	12	+11	22	Promoted to 2018 League 1
3	Central 500 Spartans	12	6	3	3	29	15	+14	21	
4	Perseverance Ball Runners	12	6	0	6	20	27	−7	18	
5	Harlem Strikers	12	4	4	4	18	24	−6	16	
6	Youth Stars	12	4	2	6	24	24	0	14	
7	Marabella FCC	12	2	0	10	16	41	−25	6	

Updated to match(es) played on March 13, 2018. Source:
Rules for classification: 1) points; 2) goal difference; 3) number of goals scored.
(C) Champions; (P) Promoted

=== Matches 1–12 ===
Home \ Away	C5S	HAS	MFC	PBR	PVD	PRI	YOS
Central 500 Spartans		2–2	13–1	3–1	0–1	0–3	4–4
Harlem Strikers	1–3		3–2	1–3	2–2	0–0	2–1
Marabella FCC	0–1	1–2		3–0	1–0	1–4	3–6
Perseverance Ball Runners	1–0	1–2	2–1		4–2	2–4	3–2
Petit Valley/Diego Martin United	1–1	3–0	4–1	6–0		2–0	2–1
Prisons	0–1	3–0	2–1	1–2	4–2		2–0
Youth Stars	0–1	3–3	4–1	2–1	0–2	1–0	

Updated to match(es) played on 14 March 2018. Source:
Legend: Blue = home team win; Yellow = draw; Red = away team win.

=== Top scorers ===
Rank	Player	Club	Goals
1	Donovan Derrick	Central 500 Spartans	8
1	Kevon Woodley	Youth Stars	8
3	Josiah Grazette	Central 500 Spartans	7
4	Keron Cummings	Petit Valley/Diego Martin United	6
4	Ishaq Abdullah	Petit Valley/Diego Martin United	6
4	Keith Williams II	Central 500 Spartans	6
7	Wendell Archibald	Harlem Strikers	5
7	Eric Charles	Petit Valley/Diego Martin United	5
7	Anthony Parris	Prisons	5
10	Neon O'Garro	Harlem Strikers	4
