= 1996 CONCACAF Gold Cup squads =

Football tournament squads

These are the squad lists of the teams participating in the 1996 CONCACAF Gold Cup.

== Group A ==
=== Guatemala ===
Head coach: (Argentina) Juan Ramón Verón

No.	Pos.	Player	Date of birth (age)	Caps	Club
1	GK	Edgar Estrada	16 November 1967 (aged 28)		(Guatemala) Municipal
18	GK	Julio César Englenton	22 January 1966 (aged 29)		(Guatemala) Aurora
2	DF	Eduardo Acevedo	8 June 1972 (aged 23)		(Guatemala) Comunicaciones
16	DF	Julio Girón	2 March 1970 (aged 25)		(Guatemala) Aurora
3	DF	Iván León	3 March 1967 (aged 28)		(Guatemala) Comunicaciones
14	DF	Martín Machón	4 February 1973 (aged 22)		(Guatemala) Comunicaciones
13	DF	Erick Miranda	17 December 1971 (aged 24)		(Guatemala) Amatitlán
19	DF	Marvin Ruano	8 September 1969 (aged 26)		(Guatemala) Aurora
4	DF	German Ruano	17 October 1971 (aged 24)		(Guatemala) Municipal
5	MF	Carlos Castañeda	4 January 1963 (aged 33)		(Guatemala) Comunicaciones
6	MF	Miguel Estuardo Coronado	29 March 1970 (aged 25)		(Guatemala) Suchitepéquez
7	MF	Juan Manuel Funes	16 May 1966 (aged 29)		(Guatemala) Municipal
11	MF	Jorge René Guzman	29 November 1969 (aged 26))		(Guatemala) Deportivo Escuintla
17	MF	Carlos Lemus	17 June 1974 (aged 21)		(Guatemala) Amatitlán
10	MF	Jorge Rodas	9 October 1971 (aged 24)		(Guatemala) Comunicaciones
9	FW	Edgar Arriaza	16 April 1968 (aged 27)		(Guatemala) Comunicaciones
15	FW	Juan Carlos Plata	1 January 1971 (aged 25)		(Guatemala) Municipal
8	FW	Julio Rodas	9 December 1966 (aged 29)		(El Salvador) FAS
12	FW	Edgar Valencia	31 March 1971 (aged 24)		(Guatemala) Municipal
20	FW	Edwin Westphal	3 April 1966 (aged 29)		(Guatemala) Aurora

=== Mexico ===
Head coach: (Federal Republic of Yugoslavia) Bora Milutinović

No.	Pos.	Player	Date of birth (age)	Caps	Club
1	GK	Oswaldo Sanchez	21 September 1973 (aged 22)		(Mexico) Atlas
2	DF	Claudio Suárez	17 December 1968 (aged 27)		(Mexico) UNAM Pumas
3	DF	Francisco Javier Sánchez	30 January 1973 (aged 22)		(Mexico) América
4	DF	Salvador Carmona	22 August 1975 (aged 20)		(Mexico) Toluca
5	DF	Duilio Davino	21 March 1976 (aged 19)		(Mexico) UAG Tecos
6	MF	Raúl Rodrigo Lara	28 February 1973 (aged 22)		(Mexico) América
7	MF	Ramón Ramírez	5 December 1969 (aged 26)		(Mexico) Guadalajara
8	MF	Alberto Garcia Aspe	11 May 1967 (aged 28)		(Mexico) Necaxa
9	FW	Ricardo Peláez	14 March 1964 (aged 31)		(Mexico) Necaxa
10	FW	Luis García Postigo	1 June 1969 (aged 26)		(Mexico) América
11	FW	Luis Hernández	22 December 1968 (aged 27)		(Mexico) Necaxa
12	GK	Carlos Briones	16 June 1968 (aged 27)		(Mexico) Tecos UAG
14	MF	Joaquín del Olmo	20 April 1969 (aged 26)		(Mexico) América
15	FW	Cuauhtémoc Blanco	17 January 1973 (aged 22)		(Mexico) América
16	DF	Edson Astivia	9 April 1975 (aged 20)		(Mexico) Toros Neza
17	DF	Germán Villa	2 April 1973 (aged 22)		(Mexico) América
18	FW	Agustín García	1 June 1973 (aged 22)		(Mexico) UAG Tecos
19	GK	Jorge Campos	15 October 1966 (aged 29)		(Mexico) Atlante
20	FW	Eustacio Rizo	30 September 1971 (aged 24)		(Mexico) UAG Tecos
21	DF	Raúl Gutiérrez	16 October 1966 (aged 29)		(Mexico) América

=== Saint Vincent and the Grenadines ===
Head coach: (Jamaica) Lenny Taylor

No.	Pos.	Player	Date of birth (age)	Caps	Club
1	GK	Urtis Blackett	24 March 1973 (aged 22)		(Saint Vincent and the Grenadines) GMA Kingstown Frenches FC
20	GK	Fitzgerald Bramble	27 October 1967 (aged 28)		(Saint Vincent and the Grenadines) Hotspurs FC
18	DF	Dexter Browne	7 September 1972 (aged 23)		(Saint Vincent and the Grenadines) GMA Kingstown Frenches FC
19	DF	Burton Forde	11 February 1971 (aged 24)		(Saint Vincent and the Grenadines) Youth Olympians
5	DF	Ezra Hendrickson	16 January 1972 (aged 23)		(United States) New Orleans Riverboat Gamblers
3	DF	Cornelius Huggins	1 June 1974 (aged 21)		(Saint Vincent and the Grenadines) Pastures United FC
15	DF	Keith Ollivierre	13 April 1971 (aged 24)		(Saint Vincent and the Grenadines) Camdonia Chelsea SC
4	DF	Verbin Sutherland	10 November 1966 (aged 29)		(Saint Vincent and the Grenadines) Stingers
6	DF	Dexter Walker	21 March 1971 (aged 24)		(Saint Vincent and the Grenadines) GMA Kingstown Frenches FC
2	MF	Earl Alexander			(Saint Vincent and the Grenadines) GMA Kingstown Frenches FC
16	MF	Orane Ash	16 February 1976 (aged 19)		(United States) North Carolina State Wolfpack
13	MF	Kenlyn Gonsalves	16 March 1976 (aged 19)		(Saint Vincent and the Grenadines) Stubborn Youth SC
12	MF	Wesley John	4 October 1976 (aged 19)		(Saint Vincent and the Grenadines) Rodox United
8	MF	Tyrone Prince	12 March 1968 (aged 27)		(Saint Vincent and the Grenadines) Sesco
7	MF	Everad Sam	6 September 1974 (aged 21)		(Saint Vincent and the Grenadines) Avenues United FC
11	MF	Kendall Velox	18 August 1971 (aged 24)		(Saint Vincent and the Grenadines) GMA Kingstown Frenches FC
14	FW	Rohan Keizer			(Saint Vincent and the Grenadines)
10	FW	Andre Hinds	24 April 1971 (aged 24)		(Saint Vincent and the Grenadines) Stingers
9	FW	Rodney Jack	28 September 1972 (aged 23)		(England) Torquay United
17	FW	Marlon James	16 November 1976 (aged 19)		(Saint Vincent and the Grenadines) Youth Olympians

== Group B ==
=== Brazil ===
Head coach: (Brazil) Mario Zagallo

No.	Pos.	Player	Date of birth (age)	Caps	Club
1	GK	Dida	7 October 1973 (aged 22)		(Brazil) Cruzeiro
2	DF	Zé Maria	25 July 1973 (aged 22)		(Brazil) Portuguesa
3	DF	Alexandre Lopes	29 October 1974 (aged 21)		(Brazil) Corinthians
4	DF	Narciso	23 December 1973 (aged 22)		(Brazil) Santos
5	MF	Flavio Conceição	13 June 1974 (aged 21)		(Brazil) Palmeiras
6	DF	André Luiz	11 January 1974 (aged 21)		(Brazil) São Paulo
7	FW	Caio	16 August 1975 (aged 20)		(Italy) Inter Milan
8	MF	Amaral	28 February 1973 (aged 22)		(Brazil) Palmeiras
9	MF	Iranildo	16 October 1976 (aged 19)		(Brazil) Botafogo
10	MF	Arílson	11 June 1973 (aged 22)		(Germany) 1. FC Kaiserslautern
11	FW	Sávio	9 January 1974 (aged 22)		(Brazil) Flamengo
12	GK	Danrlei	18 April 1973 (aged 22)		(Brazil) Grêmio
13	DF	Carlinhos	5 December 1974 (aged 21)		(Brazil) Guarani
14	DF	Gélson Baresi	11 May 1974 (aged 21)		(Brazil) Cruzeiro
15	DF	Zé Roberto	6 July 1974 (aged 21)		(Brazil) Portuguesa
16	MF	Zé Elias	25 September 1976 (aged 19)		(Brazil) Corinthians
17	MF	Beto	7 January 1975 (aged 21)		(Brazil) Botafogo
18	FW	Paulo Jamelli	22 July 1972 (aged 23)		(Brazil) Santos
19	MF	Souza	6 June 1975 (aged 20)		(Brazil) Corinthians
20	FW	Leandro Machado	22 March 1976 (aged 19)		(Brazil) Internacional

=== Canada ===
Head coach: (Canada) Bob Lenarduzzi

No.	Pos.	Player	Date of birth (age)	Caps	Club
1	GK	Craig Forrest	20 September 1967 (aged 28)	29	(England) Ipswich Town
2	DF	Frank Yallop	4 April 1964 (aged 31)	35	(England) Blackpool
3	DF	Iain Fraser	7 April 1963 (aged 32)	13	(United States) Sacramento Knights
6	DF	Colin Miller	4 October 1964 (aged 31)	45	(Scotland) Dunfermline Athletic
7	FW	Tomasz Radzinski	14 December 1973 (aged 22)	4	(Belgium) Germinal Ekeren
8	MF	Lyndon Hooper	30 May 1966 (aged 29)	54	(Canada) Montreal Impact
9	MF	Alex Bunbury	18 June 1967 (aged 28)	45	(Portugal) Marítimo
11	MF	Tom Kouzmanis	22 April 1973 (aged 22)	3	(Canada) Montreal Impact
12	FW	Carlo Corazzin	25 December 1971 (aged 24)	11	(England) Cambridge United
14	MF	Geoff Aunger	4 February 1968 (aged 27)	26	(Canada) Vancouver 86ers
15	MF	John Limniatis	24 June 1967 (aged 28)	37	(Canada) Montreal Impact
16	MF	Kevin Holness	25 September 1971 (aged 24)	6	(Canada) Montreal Impact
17	MF	Martin Dugas	15 October 1972 (aged 23)	0	(Netherlands) Cambuur
18	GK	Paul Dolan	16 April 1966 (aged 29)	47	(Canada) Vancouver 86ers
20	FW	Niall Thompson	16 April 1974 (aged 21)	6	(Canada) Montreal Impact
22	GK	Pat Onstad	13 January 1968 (aged 27)	-	(Canada) Montreal Impact
23	DF	Carl Fletcher	26 December 1971 (aged 24)	3	(Canada) Montreal Impact
24	DF	Ian Carter	20 September 1967 (aged 28)	8	(Canada) Montreal Impact
25	DF	Paul Fenwick	25 August 1969 (aged 26)	1	(Scotland) St Mirren

=== Honduras ===
Head coach: (Brazil) Ernesto Rosa Guedes

No.	Pos.	Player	Date of birth (age)	Caps	Club
	GK	Milton Flores	5 December 1974 (aged 21)		(Honduras) Real España
	GK	Wilmer Cruz	18 December 1965 (aged 30)		(Honduras) Motagua
	DF	Arnold Cruz	22 December 1971 (aged 24)		(Mexico) Toluca
	DF	José Fernandez	29 November 1970 (aged 25)		(Honduras) Olimpia
	DF	Norberto Martínez	6 June 1966 (aged 29)		(Honduras) Olimpia
	DF	Raúl Martínez Sambulá	14 March 1963 (aged 32)		(Honduras) Victoria
	DF	Mario Peri	5 March 1970 (aged 25)		(Peru) Deportivo Sipesa
	DF	Behiker Bustillo	30 December 1973 (aged 22)		(Honduras) Marathón
	MF	Renán Aguilera	23 November 1965 (aged 30)		(Honduras) Victoria
	MF	Camilo Bonilla	30 September 1971 (aged 24)		(Peru) Deportivo Sipesa
	MF	Óscar Lagos	17 June 1973 (aged 22)		(Honduras) Real Maya
	MF	Alex Pineda Chacón	19 December 1969 (aged 26)		(Honduras) Olimpia
	MF	Jorge Pineda	26 November 1964 (aged 31)		(Honduras) Vida
	MF	José Luis Pineda	19 March 1975 (aged 20)		(Honduras) Olimpia
	MF	Christian Santamaria	20 December 1972 (aged 23)		(Honduras) Olimpia
	FW	Eduardo Bennett	17 September 1968 (aged 27)		(Argentina) Argentinos Juniors
	FW	Presley Carson	20 July 1968 (aged 27)		(Honduras) Motagua
	FW	Enrique Reneau	9 April 1971 (aged 24)		(Honduras) Olimpia
	FW	Eugenio Dolmo Flores	31 July 1965 (aged 30)		(Honduras) Olimpia
	FW	Milton Núñez	30 October 1972 (aged 23)		(Guatemala) Comunicaciones

== Group C ==
=== El Salvador ===
Head coach: (Argentina) José Omar Pastoriza

No.	Pos.	Player	Date of birth (age)	Caps	Club
16	GK	Misael Alfaro	6 January 1971 (aged 25)		(El Salvador) Luis Ángel Firpo
1	GK	Raúl García	13 September 1962 (aged 33)		(El Salvador) Águila
3	DF	Leonel Carcamo	5 May 1965 (aged 30)		(El Salvador) Luis Ángel Firpo
5	DF	Jaime Vladimir Cubías	10 March 1974 (aged 21)		(El Salvador) FAS
5	DF	Carlos Hernández			(El Salvador) Luis Ángel Firpo
20	DF	Wilfredo Iraheta	22 February 1967 (aged 28)		(El Salvador) FAS
2	DF	Mario Mayén Meza	19 May 1968 (aged 27)		(El Salvador) FAS
4	DF	William Osorio	13 April 1971 (aged 24)		(El Salvador) Luis Ángel Firpo
8	MF	Carlos Castro Borja	1 August 1967 (aged 28)		(El Salvador) Atlético Marte
19	MF	Erber Burgos	31 December 1969 (aged 26)		(El Salvador) FAS
12	MF	Mauricio Cienfuegos	12 February 1968 (aged 27)		(El Salvador) Luis Ángel Firpo
13	MF	Milton Meléndez	3 August 1967 (aged 28)		(El Salvador) Alianza
9	MF	Marlon Menjívar	1 September 1965 (aged 30)		(El Salvador) Luis Ángel Firpo
17	MF	Erick Prado	25 January 1976 (aged 19)		(El Salvador) ADET
15	MF	Guillermo Rivera	11 January 1969 (aged 26)		(El Salvador) FAS
7	MF	Jorge Rodríguez	20 May 1971 (aged 24)		(El Salvador) FAS
10	FW	Raúl Díaz Arce	1 February 1970 (aged 25)		(El Salvador) Luis Ángel Firpo
11	FW	Ronald Cerritos	3 January 1975 (aged 21)		(El Salvador) ADET
14	FW	Oscar Díaz	15 October 1970 (aged 25)		(El Salvador) FAS
18	FW	William Renderos	3 October 1971 (aged 24)		(El Salvador) Luis Ángel Firpo

=== Trinidad and Tobago ===
Head coach: (Federal Republic of Yugoslavia) Zoran Vranes

No.	Pos.	Player	Date of birth (age)	Caps	Club
1	GK	David Austin	24 February 1973 (aged 22)		(Trinidad and Tobago) Defence Force
21	GK	Michael McCommie	22 April 1972 (aged 23)		(Trinidad and Tobago) ECM Motown
22	GK	Ross Russell	18 December 1967 (aged 28)		(Trinidad and Tobago) Defence Force
5	DF	Craig Demmin	21 May 1971 (aged 24)		(Scotland) East Fife
13	DF	Ancil Elcock	17 March 1969 (aged 26)		(Trinidad and Tobago) Malta Carib Alcons
4	DF	Dexter Francis	1 April 1963 (aged 32)		(Trinidad and Tobago) United Petrotrin
19	DF	Shawn Garcia	5 December 1976 (aged 19)		(Trinidad and Tobago) Defence Force
3	DF	Sherwyn Julien	27 July 1970 (aged 25)		(Trinidad and Tobago) United Petrotrin
16	DF	Richard Theodore	22 October 1971 (aged 24)		(Trinidad and Tobago) Defence Force
14	DF	Alvin Thomas	17 November 1966 (aged 29)		(Trinidad and Tobago) San Juan Jabloteh
17	MF	Lyndon Andrews	20 January 1976 (aged 19)		(Trinidad and Tobago) Superstar Rangers
9	MF	Arnold Dwarika	23 February 1973 (aged 22)		(Scotland) East Fife
6	MF	Marvin Faustin	22 October 1967 (aged 28)		(Trinidad and Tobago) Superstar Rangers
10	MF	Russell Latapy	2 August 1968 (aged 27)		(Portugal) Porto
12	MF	David Nakhid	15 May 1964 (aged 31)		(Lebanon) Al Ansar
2	MF	Anthony Rougier	17 July 1971 (aged 24)		(Scotland) Raith Rovers
15	MF	Terry St. Louis	23 December 1969 (aged 26)		(Trinidad and Tobago) San Juan Jabloteh
8	FW	Angus Eve	23 February 1972 (aged 23)		(Trinidad and Tobago) Defence Force
7	FW	Evans Wise	23 November 1973 (aged 22)		(Germany) SG Egelsbach
11	FW	Dwight Yorke	3 November 1971 (aged 24)		(England) Aston Villa

=== United States ===
Head coach: (United States) Steve Sampson

No.	Pos.	Player	Date of birth (age)	Caps	Club
1	GK	Brad Friedel	18 May 1971 (aged 24)		(Turkey) Galatasaray
2	DF	Frankie Hejduk	5 August 1974 (aged 21)		(United States) Tampa Bay Mutiny
3	DF	Steve Pittman	18 July 1967 (aged 28)		(Scotland) Partick Thistle
4	DF	Mike Burns	14 September 1970 (aged 25)		(Denmark) Viborg
5	MF	Thomas Dooley	5 December 1961 (aged 34)		(Germany) Schalke 04
6	MF	John Harkes	8 March 1967 (aged 28)		(England) West Ham United
7	MF	Mike Sorber	14 May 1971 (aged 24)		(Mexico) UNAM Pumas
8	FW	Jovan Kirovski	18 March 1976 (aged 19)		(England) Manchester United
9	FW	Joe-Max Moore	23 February 1971 (aged 24)		(Germany) 1. FC Nürnberg
10	MF	Tab Ramos	21 September 1966 (aged 29)		(Mexico) Tigres UANL
11	FW	Eric Wynalda	9 June 1969 (aged 26)		(Germany) VfL Bochum
12	DF	Jeff Agoos	2 May 1968 (aged 27)		(United States) D.C. United
13	MF	Cobi Jones	16 June 1970 (aged 25)		(Brazil) Vasco da Gama
14	MF	Frank Klopas	1 September 1966 (aged 29)		(United States) Kansas City Wizards
15	FW	Roy Lassiter	9 March 1969 (aged 26)		(United States) Tampa Bay Mutiny
16	GK	Juergen Sommer	27 February 1969 (aged 26)		(England) Luton Town
17	DF	Marcelo Balboa	8 August 1967 (aged 28)		(Mexico) Leon
18	GK	Kasey Keller	29 November 1969 (aged 26)		(England) Millwall F.C.
20	DF	Paul Caligiuri	9 May 1964 (aged 31)		(Germany) FC St. Pauli
21	MF	Claudio Reyna	20 July 1973 (aged 22)		(Germany) Bayer Leverkusen
22	DF	Alexi Lalas	1 June 1970 (aged 25)		(Italy) Padova
