= Saint Vincent and the Grenadines at the CONCACAF Gold Cup =

The CONCACAF Gold Cup is North America's major tournament in senior men's football and determines the continental champion. Until 1989, the tournament was known as CONCACAF Championship. It is currently held every two years. From 1996 to 2005, nations from other confederations have regularly joined the tournament as invitees. In earlier editions, the continental championship was held in different countries, but since the inception of the Gold Cup in 1991, the United States are constant hosts or co-hosts.

From 1973 to 1989, the tournament doubled as the confederation's World Cup qualification. CONCACAF's representative team at the FIFA Confederations Cup was decided by a play-off between the winners of the last two tournament editions in 2015 via the CONCACAF Cup, but was then discontinued along with the Confederations Cup.

Since the inaugural tournament in 1963, the Gold Cup was held 28 times and has been won by seven different nations, most often by Mexico (13 titles).

Saint Vincent and the Grenadines became a full FIFA member in 1988, but entered the qualification process for a continental championship for the first time in 1993. They for a lone Gold Cup in 1996. Out of the 31 nations which have participated at Gold Cups or its preceding tournaments, Saint Vincent and the Grenadines are one of only two sides which have yet to score a goal.

== Record at the CONCACAF Championship/Gold Cup ==
CONCACAF Championship & CONCACAF Gold Cup
Year	Result	Position	Pld	W	D	L	GF	GA
(El Salvador) 1963	Not a CONCACAF member							
(Guatemala) 1965	Not a CONCACAF member							
(Honduras) 1967	Not a CONCACAF member							
(Costa Rica) 1969	Not a CONCACAF member							
(Trinidad and Tobago) 1971	Not a CONCACAF member							
(Haiti) 1973	Not a CONCACAF member							
(Mexico) 1977	Not a CONCACAF member							
(Honduras) 1981	Not a CONCACAF member							
1985	Not a CONCACAF member							
1989	Did not enter							
(United States) 1991	Did not enter							
(Mexico) (United States) 1993	Did not qualify							
(United States) 1996	Group stage	9th	2	0	0	2	0	8
(United States) 1998	Did not qualify							
(United States) 2000	Did not qualify							
(United States) 2002	Did not qualify							
(Mexico) (United States) 2003	Did not enter							
(United States) 2005	Did not qualify							
(United States) 2007	Did not qualify							
(United States) 2009	Did not qualify							
(United States) 2011	Did not qualify							
(United States) 2013	Did not qualify							
(Canada) (United States) 2015	Did not qualify							
(United States) 2017	Did not qualify							
(Costa Rica) (Jamaica) (United States) 2019	Did not qualify							
(United States) 2021	Did not qualify							
(Canada) (United States) 2023	Did not qualify							
(Canada) (United States) 2025	Did not qualify							
2027	???	???	???	???	???	???	???	???
Total	2/32	28/31	2	0	0	2	0	8

== Match overview ==
Tournament	Round	Opponent	Score	Venue
(United States) 1996	Group stage	Mexico	0–5	San Diego
(United States) 1996	Group stage	Guatemala	0–3	Anaheim

== 1996 squad ==
Head coach: (Jamaica) Lenny Taylor

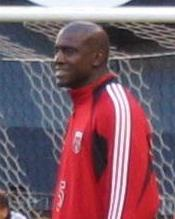
Defender Ezra Hendrickson has played through both CONCACAF Gold Cup matches for his country. He was one of only three squad members playing abroad, and went on to have a notable professional career in the US, representing LA Galaxy and Columbus Crew, among others.

Position	Name	Date of birth (age)	Club	Matches	Minutes
GK	Fitzgerald Bramble	27 October 1967 (aged 28)	(Saint Vincent and the Grenadines) Hotspurs FC	2	180
GK	Urtis Blackett	24 March 1973 (age 22)	(Saint Vincent and the Grenadines) GMA Kingstown Frenches FC	0	0
DF	Dexter Browne	7 September 1972 (aged 23)	(Saint Vincent and the Grenadines) GMA Kingstown Frenches FC	2	116
DF	Burton Forde	11 February 1971 (aged 24)	(Saint Vincent and the Grenadines) Youth Olimpians	1	59
DF	Ezra Hendrickson	16 January 1972 (aged 23)	(United States) New Orleans Riverboat Gamblers	2	180
DF	Cornelius Huggins	1 June 1974 (aged 21)	(Saint Vincent and the Grenadines) Pastures United FC	2	150
DF	Keith Ollivierre	13 April 1971 (aged 24)	(Saint Vincent and the Grenadines) Camdonia Chelsea SC	1	64
DF	Verbin Sutherland	10 November 1966 (aged 29)	(Saint Vincent and the Grenadines) Stingers FC	2	180
DF	Dexter Walker	21 March 1971 (aged 24)	(Saint Vincent and the Grenadines) GMA Kingstown Frenches FC	2	180
MF	Earl Alexander		(Saint Vincent and the Grenadines) GMA Kingstown Frenches FC	1	22
MF	Oronde Ash	16 February 1976 (aged 19)	(United States) North Carolina State University	2	97
MF	Kenlyn Gonsalves	16 March 1976 (aged 19)	(Saint Vincent and the Grenadines) Stubborn Youth SC	1	52
MF	Wesley John	4 October 1976 (aged 19)	(Saint Vincent and the Grenadines) Rodox United	1	68
MF	Tyrone Prince	12 March 1968 (aged 27)	(Saint Vincent and the Grenadines) SESCO	1	80
MF	Everad Sam		(Saint Vincent and the Grenadines) Avenues United FC	1	3
MF	Kendall Velox	18 August 1971 (aged 24)	(Saint Vincent and the Grenadines) GMA Kingstown Frenches FC	1	90
FW	Andre Hinds		(Saint Vincent and the Grenadines) Stingers FC	2	180
FW	Rodney Jack	28 September 1972 (aged 23)	(England) Torquay United	2	180
FW	Marlon James	16 November 1976 (aged 19)	(Saint Vincent and the Grenadines) Youth Olimpians	2	69
FW	Rohan Keizer		(Saint Vincent and the Grenadines) Tafari	0	0
