= 2023 TT Premier Football League =

TT Premier Football League
- Season: 2023
- Dates: 10 March – 24 June 2023
- Champions: Defence Force; 5th Pro League title 24th Trinbagonian title
- Caribbean Cup: Defence Force; Port of Spain
- Caribbean Shield: Sando
- Matches: 132
- Goals: 430 (3.26 per match)
- Average attendance: 114

The 2023 TT Premier Football League was the 22nd season of the TT Premier Football League, the top tier of football in Trinidad and Tobago, and the first season under its current branding. It was the first year that top flight football was played in Trinidad and Tobago since the start of the COVID-19 pandemic. The season began on 10 March and concluded on 24 June 2023.

Defending champions, Defence Force, successfully defended their title, winning their fifth Premier League title, and their 23rd overall Trindadian top-flight title. Defence Force and league runners-up, Port of Spain, earned group stage berths into the 2023 CONCACAF Caribbean Cup, for an opportunity to play in the 2024 CONCACAF Champions Cup.

== Background ==
The last season the TT Premier Football League played was in 2020, due to the COVID-19 pandemic. The 2019–20 season began on 13 December 2019 and was scheduled to end on 10 April 2020. However, the season prematurely ended on 20 March 2020 due to the pandemic. Defence Force F.C. were crowned champions virtue of being top of the league by the time of cancellation.

== Teams ==
Location of the 2023 TT Premier League teams

The same 11 teams that played in 2020 returned for the 2023 season with the inclusion of Prison Service F.C, who were the champions of the second division in 2019.

=== Team summaries ===
Note: Flags indicate national team as has been defined under FIFA eligibility rules. Players may hold more than one non-FIFA nationality.

Team	Location	Stadium	Capacity	Manager	Captain
Central Football Club	Couva (California)	Ato Boldon Stadium	10,000	(Trinidad and Tobago) Stern John	(Trinidad and Tobago) Che Benny
Club Sando Football Club	San Fernando	Mahaica Oval Pavilion	2,500	(Trinidad and Tobago) Angus Eve	(Trinidad and Tobago) Jayson Joseph
Cunupia Football Club	Cunupia	Larry Gomes Stadium	10,000	(Trinidad and Tobago) Michael De Four	(Trinidad and Tobago) Kevon Woodley
Defence Force Football Club	Chaguaramas	Hasely Crawford Stadium	27,000	(Trinidad and Tobago) Marvin Gordon	(Trinidad and Tobago) Jerwyn Balthazar
La Horquetta Rangers Football Club	Arima (La Horquetta)	La Horquetta Recreational Grounds	1,000	(Trinidad and Tobago) Dave Quamina	(Trinidad and Tobago) Chadley David
Morvant Caledonia United	Morvant/Laventille	Morvant Recreational Ground	3,000	(Trinidad and Tobago) Jerry Moe	(Trinidad and Tobago) Kareem Joseph
Point Fortin Civic Football Club	Point Fortin	Mahaica Oval Pavilion	2,500	(Trinidad and Tobago) Reynold Carrington	(Trinidad and Tobago) Hughtun Hector
Police Football Club	Port of Spain (Saint James)	Manny Ramjohn Stadium	10,000	(Trinidad and Tobago) Richard Hood	(Trinidad and Tobago) Adrian Foncette
Athletic Club Port of Spain	Port of Spain	Hasely Crawford Stadium	27,000	(Serbia) Zoran Vraneš	(Trinidad and Tobago) Sean John
Prison Service Football Club	Arouca	Youth Training Centre	1,000		
San Juan Jabloteh Football Club	San Juan	Ato Boldon Recreational Park	1,000	(Trinidad and Tobago) Keith Jeffrey	(Trinidad and Tobago) Elton John
W Connection Football Club	Couva (Point Lisas)	Manny Ramjohn Stadium	10,000	(Saint Lucia) Stuart Charles-Fevrier	(Saint Kitts and Nevis) Gerard Williams

== Table ==
Pos	Team	Pld	W	D	L	GF	GA	GD	Pts	Qualification
1	Defence Force (C)	22	18	2	2	53	16	+37	56	Qualified for 2023 CONCACAF Caribbean Cup
2	Port of Spain	22	18	1	3	63	18	+45	55	Qualified for 2023 CONCACAF Caribbean Cup
3	Sando	22	15	3	4	43	22	+21	48	Qualified for 2023 CONCACAF Caribbean Shield
4	La Horquetta Rangers	22	14	1	7	62	31	+31	43	
5	Police	22	12	3	7	43	32	+11	39	
6	Central	22	11	1	10	38	41	−3	34	
7	Point Fortin Civic	22	7	4	11	21	27	−6	25	
8	San Juan Jabloteh	22	6	4	12	35	46	−11	22	
9	W Connection	22	6	4	12	19	36	−17	22	
10	Morvant Caledonia United	22	5	2	15	24	50	−26	17	
11	Prison Service	22	3	3	16	16	61	−45	12	
12	Cunupia	22	2	2	18	13	50	−37	8	

Source: RSSSF
(C) Champions

== Attendances ==
The average league attendance was 255:

#	Club	Average
1	Defence Force	523
2	Port of Spain	472
3	W Connection	386
4	San Juan Jabloteh	277
5	Sando	268
6	La Horquetta Rangers	247
7	Central	239
8	Police	221
9	Point Fortin Civic	147
10	Morvant Caledonia United	119
11	Cunupia	93
12	Prison Service	67
