= 2019–20 TT Pro League =

TT Pro League
- Season: 2019–20
- Champions: Defence Force; 4th Pro League title
- 2021 Caribbean Club Championship: Defence Force; La Horquetta Rangers
- Matches: 94
- Goals: 284 (3.02 per match)
- Top goalscorer: Shaqkeem Joseph 11 goals
- Biggest home win: La Horquetta Rangers 8–1 Cunupia; 31 January 2020
- Biggest away win: San Juan Jabloteh 0–5 Club Sando; 4 February 2020
- Highest scoring: La Horquetta Rangers 7–2 Port of Spain; 19 December 2019; La Horquetta Rangers 8–1 Cunupia; 31 January 2020

The 2019–20 TT Pro League season is the 21st season of the TT Pro League, the Trinidad and Tobago professional league for association football clubs, since its establishment in 1999. A total of eleven teams are contesting the league, with W Connection the defending champions from the 2018 season.

League play officially started on 13 December 2019 and was originally to end in April 2020. However, due to the COVID-19 pandemic in Trinidad and Tobago, the league was cut short and Defence Force were crowned champions virtue of being top of the league by the time of cancellation. It was their first title since the 2012–13 season.

== Changes from the 2018 season ==
- Cunupia FC were admitted into the league, bringing the total number of teams to eleven.
- St. Ann's Rangers relocated to La Horquetta, Arima and rebranded to La Horquetta Rangers
- North East Stars relocated to Port of Spain and rebranded to AC Port of Spain

== Teams ==
=== Team summaries ===
Location of the 2018 TT Pro League teams

Note: Flags indicate national team as has been defined under FIFA eligibility rules. Players may hold more than one non-FIFA nationality.

Team	Location	Stadium	Capacity	Manager	Captain
Central	California	Ato Boldon Stadium	10,000	(Trinidad and Tobago) Stern John	(Trinidad and Tobago) Che Benny
Club Sando	San Fernando	Mahaica Oval Pavilion	2,500	(Trinidad and Tobago) Angus Eve	(Trinidad and Tobago) Jayson Joseph
Cunupia	Cunupia	Larry Gomes Stadium	10,000	(Trinidad and Tobago) Michael De Four	(Trinidad and Tobago) Kevon Woodley
Defence Force	Chaguaramas	Hasely Crawford Stadium	27,000	(Trinidad and Tobago) Marvin Gordon	(Trinidad and Tobago) Jerwyn Balthazar
La Horquetta Rangers	La Horquetta, Arima	La Horquetta Recreational Grounds	1,000	(Trinidad and Tobago) Dave Quamina	(Trinidad and Tobago) Chadley David
Morvant Caledonia United	Morvant/Laventille	Park Street Recreational Ground	3,000	(Trinidad and Tobago) Jerry Moe	(Trinidad and Tobago) Kareem Joseph
Point Fortin Civic	Point Fortin	Mahaica Oval Pavilion	2,500	(Trinidad and Tobago) Reynold Carrington	(Trinidad and Tobago) Hughtun Hector
Police	Saint James	Manny Ramjohn Stadium	10,000	(Trinidad and Tobago) Richard Hood	(Trinidad and Tobago) Adrian Foncette
Port of Spain	Port of Spain	Hasely Crawford Stadium	27,000	(Serbia) Zoran Vraneš	(Trinidad and Tobago) Sean John
San Juan Jabloteh	San Juan	Barataria Oval	1,000	(Trinidad and Tobago) Keith Jeffrey	(Trinidad and Tobago) Elton John
W Connection	Point Lisas	Manny Ramjohn Stadium	10,000	(Saint Lucia) Stuart Charles-Fevrier	(Saint Kitts and Nevis) Gerard Williams

== League table ==
Pos	Team	Pld	W	D	L	GF	GA	GD	Pts	Qualification
1	Defence Force (C, Q)	17	13	3	1	35	17	+18	42	2021 Caribbean Club Championship Group Stage
2	La Horquetta Rangers (Q)	17	11	2	4	48	18	+30	35	2021 Caribbean Club Championship Group Stage
3	Point Fortin Civic	17	8	4	5	25	23	+2	28	
4	W Connection	16	8	3	5	28	20	+8	27	
5	Morvant Caledonia United	17	6	6	5	20	23	−3	24	
6	Police	17	6	5	6	29	22	+7	23	
7	Club Sando	18	5	6	7	28	25	+3	21	
8	San Juan Jabloteh	17	5	4	8	21	31	−10	19	
9	Central	18	3	5	10	18	34	−16	14	
10	Port of Spain	17	3	4	10	18	38	−20	13	
11	Cunupia	17	2	6	9	14	33	−19	12	

Updated to match(es) played on 6 June 2020. Source: TT Pro League
Rules for classification: 1) points; 2) goal difference; 3) number of goals scored.
(C) Champions; (Q) Qualified for the phase indicated

== Results ==
Matches 1–20
Home \ Away	CEN	CSA	CUN	DFO	LHR	MCU	PFC	POL	POS	SJJ	WCO
Central		2–1	1–1	1–2	0–2	2–1	1–4	1–5	1–1	3–1	1–4
Club Sando	2–0		1–1	2–3	0–1	3–0	0–3	2–2	C	1–0	C
Cunupia	0–0	2–1		1–2	C	1–1	C	0–0	2–1	C	0–2
Defence Force	C	4–4	3–2		2–1	1–2	C	4–1	3–1	1–1	1–0
La Horquetta Rangers	C	1–1	8–1	0–2		4–0	5–1	2–0	7–2	6–0	4–1
Morvant Caledonia United	3–1	0–0	3–1	C	2–0		1–1	2–1	C	1–0	1–1
Point Fortin Civic	2–1	1–1	3–1	0–3	C	1–0		1–0	3–2	2–1	2–1
Police	0–0	2–1	2–0	0–0	1–2	C	3–1		4–1	C	C
Port of Spain	3–2	1–0	1–0	0–1	2–2	0–0	1–1	C		0–1	0–4
San Juan Jabloteh	1–0	0–5	1–1	1–2	0–2	4–1	0–0	3–2	5–2		C
W Connection	1–1	2–3	3–0	0–1	3–1	C	1–0	0–4	2–0	2–2	

Updated to match(es) played on 6 June 2020. Source: TT Pro League
Legend: Blue = home team win; Yellow = draw; Red = away team win.

=== Top scorers ===
Rank	Player	Club	Goals
1	(Trinidad and Tobago) Shaqkeem Joseph	Club Sando	11
2	(Trinidad and Tobago) Jamal Creighton	La Horquetta Rangers	10
3	(Trinidad and Tobago) Isaiah Lee	La Horquetta Rangers	8
4	(Trinidad and Tobago) Tyrone Charles	La Horquetta Rangers	7
4	(Trinidad and Tobago) Kevon Woodley	Cunupia	7
6	(Trinidad and Tobago) Reon Moore	Defence Force	6
6	(Trinidad and Tobago) Keron Cornwall	Club Sando	6
6	(Trinidad and Tobago) Kerville Jeremiah	Point Fortin Civic	6
6	(Saint Lucia) Tev Lawrence	Morvant Caledonia United	6
6	(Suriname) Dimitrie Apai	W Connection	6
