= List of football clubs in Trinidad and Tobago =

== 2014–15 TT Pro League ==
Location of the 2014–15 TT Pro League teams

Note: Flags indicate national team as has been defined under FIFA eligibility rules. Players may hold more than one non-FIFA nationality.

Team	Location	Stadium	Capacity	Manager	Captain
Caledonia AIA	Morvant/Laventille	Larry Gomes Stadium	10,000	(Trinidad and Tobago) Jamaal Shabazz	(Trinidad and Tobago) Stephan David
Central FC	California	Ato Boldon Stadium	10,000	(Serbia) Zoran Vraneš	(Trinidad and Tobago) Marvin Oliver
Defence Force	Chaguaramas	Hasely Crawford Stadium	27,000	(Trinidad and Tobago) Ross Russell	(Trinidad and Tobago) Corey Rivers
North East Stars	Sangre Grande	Sangre Grande Ground	7,000	(Trinidad and Tobago) Angus Eve	(Trinidad and Tobago) Cleon John
Point Fortin Civic	Point Fortin	Mahaica Oval Pavilion	2,500	(Trinidad and Tobago) Reynold Carrington	(Trinidad and Tobago) Kelvin Modeste
Police	Saint James	Hasely Crawford Stadium	27,000	(Trinidad and Tobago) Richard Hood	(Trinidad and Tobago) Trent Noel
San Juan Jabloteh	San Juan	Hasely Crawford Stadium	27,000	(Trinidad and Tobago) Keith Jeffrey	(Trinidad and Tobago) Kerry Baptiste
St. Ann's Rangers	San Juan	Hasely Crawford Stadium	27,000	(Trinidad and Tobago) Jason Spence	(Trinidad and Tobago) Terrence Lewis
W Connection	Point Lisas	Manny Ramjohn Stadium	10,000	(Saint Lucia) Stuart Charles-Fevrier	(Saint Kitts and Nevis) Gerard Williams

== National Super League ==
The following 12 clubs competed in the 2013 National Super League season.

Club	Founded	Joined	Location	Stadium	Capacity	League Titles	Last title
1.FC Santa Rosa	1992	2012	Arima	Stadio di Rosa		0	
Biche United		2012	Biche	Biche Recreation Ground		0	
Club Sando	1991	2003	San Fernando	Manny Ramjohn Stadium	10,000	0	
Defence Force Super League	1973	2003	Chaguaramas	Hasely Crawford Stadium	27,000	0	
Eagles United		2011	Chaguanas	Woodford Lodge Recreation Ground		0	
1976 FC Phoenix	1976	2004	Scarborough	Canaan Ground		0	
Joe Public	1996	2004	Arouca	Marvin Lee Stadium	6,000	4	2011
Real Maracas		2011	Saint Joseph	Maracas Recreation Ground		0	
Siparia Spurs		2012	Siparia	Palo Seco Velodrome	10,000	0	
Stokely Vale		2011	Plymouth	Plymouth Recreation Ground	1,000	0	
WASA		2003	Saint Joseph	WASA Grounds		2	2012
Westside Superstarz		2010	Diego Martin	Saint Anthony's College Ground		0	
