= Bich =

Bich may refer to:

Surname:

- Albino Bich (1901–?), Italian skier, competitor in the 1924 Winter Olympics (military patrol)
- Ivan Bich (born 1993), Russian pair skater
- Marcel Bich (1914–1994), manufacturer and co-founder of Bic, the world's leading producer of ballpoint pens

Given name:

- Bich Minh Nguyen (born 1974), American novelist
- Bui Bich Phuong (born 1971), crowned Miss Vietnam in 1988
- Luong Bich Huu, born September 1, 1984, is a Vietnamese actress and singer of Chinese ancestry
- Ngoc Bich Ngan, (Mỹ Tho, 16 September 1973), is a Vietnamese-Canadian singer, songwriter, artist and writer
- Nguyễn Quang Bích (1832–1890), Vietnamese poet
- Nguyễn Thị Bích (1830–1909), Vietnamese poet
- Tran Bich San (born 1940), famous Vietnamese writer, philosopher, and intellectual

Other:

- BICh, the abbreviated name for aircraft designed by Boris Ivanovich Cheranovsky
- Bich 10 or Ten-string guitar, including both electric and acoustic guitars
- Bich-poo or Poodle crossbreed, purebred poodles that have been crossbred with another purebred dog breed
- Kali Bich, a name for Potassium dichromate

== See also ==
- Bich Dong, capital of Việt Yên District, Bac Giang Province, Vietnam
- Bich Sơn
- Biche
- Bicheh
- Biches
- Bitch (disambiguation)
- Bitche
- Bitsch (disambiguation)

Media related to Bich at Wikimedia Commons
