= Football in Trinidad and Tobago =

- Country: Trinidad and Tobago
- Governing body: Trinidad and Tobago Football Association
- National team: Men's national team
- First played: 1862

National competitions
- TT Pro League; TT Women's League Football

International competitions
- CONCACAF Champions League; CONCACAF League; Caribbean Club Championship; FIFA Club World Cup; CONCACAF Gold Cup (National Team); CONCACAF Nations League (National Team); FIFA World Cup (National Team); CONCACAF Women's Championship (National Team); FIFA Women's World Cup (National Team)

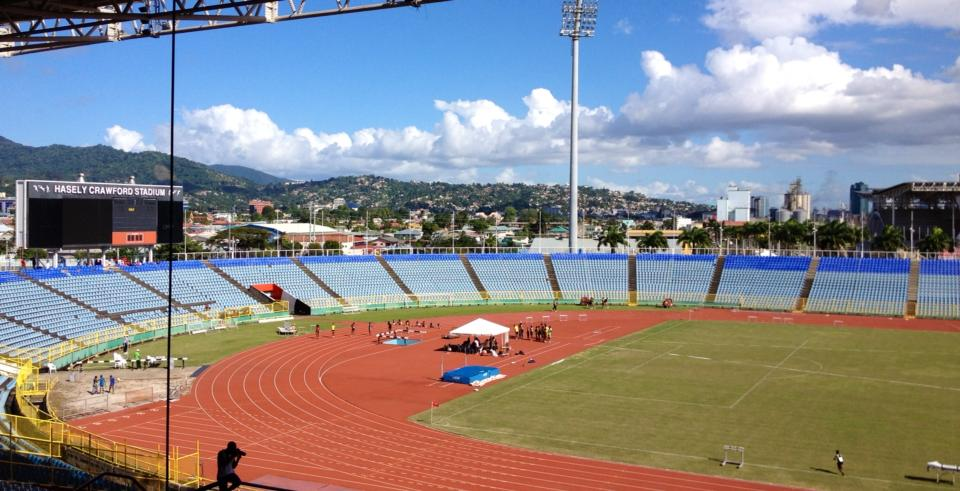
The Hasely Crawford Stadium.

Association football is the most popular sport in Trinidad and Tobago after cricket.

== Men's football leagues ==
The professional first-division league in Trinidad and Tobago is the TT Pro League, which consists of nine teams located on the island of Trinidad. The Pro League was formed in 1999 as part of a need for a professional league to strengthen the country's national team and improve the development of domestic players. The most successful club in the league has been Defence Force, who has won the league championship 22 times. The National Super League is the semi-professional second-division league in Trinidad and Tobago and contains 12 teams. The Super League was founded in 2003 to allow the best teams from association football to play in a semi-professional environment, as they prepare for life in the professional game. The amateur third and fourth divisions of six regional football associations which govern their own first and second divisions.

The Trinidad and Tobago Football Association sanctions regional tournaments that allow entry into the FA Trophy, which is the premier knockout tournament for teams in Trinidad and Tobago. The competition is open to all those affiliated with the FA. The FA Trophy is the oldest football competition in Trinidad and Tobago, dating back to 1927 and pits teams from the top three levels of the football pyramid against each other each year, similar to England's FA Cup.

=== International competitions ===
Trinidad and Tobago are members of CONCACAF, which governs association football in North America, Central America, and the Caribbean. Trinidad and Tobago are also members of the Caribbean Football Union and compete in regional competitions staged by the governing body. At the club level, CFU organises an annual competition, called the CFU Club Championship, open to the champions of each Caribbean's football association first-division. Presently, the TT Pro League has two automatic qualification places given to the top 2 teams in the league standings following each season. The league champion is automatically seeded and enter the competition in the Second Round, whereas the league runner-up enter in the First Round.

As of the 2012–13 CONCACAF Champions League, Caribbean qualifying teams include the top three clubs from the 2012 CFU Club Championship. In the case any Caribbean club is precluded, it is supplanted by the fourth-place finisher from the CFU Club Championship. Between 2008–09 and 2011–12, the Champions League was played as a twenty-four team tournament with a preliminary round, followed by a sixteen-team group stage (four groups of four), followed by an eight-team home-and-away single-elimination tournament. In early 2012, CONCACAF announced a new format for the 2012–13 edition of its Champions League. Under the new format, the preliminary round would be eliminated, and group play would consist of eight groups of three teams each, with each group winner advancing to the quarterfinals.

== Trinidadians playing in foreign leagues ==
Since the early 1990s, many Trinidad and Tobago men have found opportunities playing football at the highest levels of foreign leagues. Among the first players from Trinidad and Tobago to become regulars in foreign leagues were Dwight Yorke at Aston Villa and later Manchester United in England, Leonson Lewis at Académica de Coimbra in Portugal, and Brian Haynes at FC Dallas in the United States. The following is a list of Trinidadians playing in foreign leagues:

Asia (AFC)
Country	League	Player	Club
India	I-League	Cornell Glen	Mohun Bagan
India	I-League	Densill Theobald	Sporting Clube de Goa
Philippines	United Football League	Sean Bateau	Global
South Korea	K League Challenge	Carlyle Mitchell	Seoul E-Land FC
Thailand	Division 1 League	Kendall Jagdeosingh	TTM Customs
Thailand	Regional League Division 2	Darryl Roberts	Ubon UMT United
(United Arab Emirates) UAE	Pro League	Kenwyne Jones	Al Jazira Club

Europe (UEFA)
Country	League	Player	Club
Belgium	Pro League	John Bostock	Oud-Heverlee Leuven
Belgium	Pro League	Khaleem Hyland	KVC Westerlo
Denmark	1st Division	Radanfah Abu Bakr	HB Køge
England	Football League One	Chris Birchall	Port Vale
England	Football League Two	Andre Boucaud	Dagenham & Redbridge
England	Football League Two	Gavin Hoyte	Barnet
England	Football League Two	Justin Hoyte	Dagenham & Redbridge
Finland	Ykkönen	Akil DeFreitas	FC Jazz
Finland	Ykkönen	Cameron Roget	Vasa IFK
Finland	Kakkonen	Jamel Farell	Sporting Kristina
Iceland	Úrvalsdeild	Jonathan Glenn	Breiðablik UBK
Kazakhstan	Premier League	Lester Peltier	Irtysh Pavlodar
Netherlands	Eredivisie	Levi García	AZ Alkmaar
Poland	I Liga	Keon Daniel	Miedź Legnica
Portugal	Campeonato de Portugal	Duane Muckette	Barreirense
Russia	Premier League	Sheldon Bateau	FC Krylia Sovetov Samara
Scotland	League One	Jason Scotland	Stenhousemuir
Scotland	League Two	Marvin Andrews	Clyde
Slovenia	Slovenian Third League	Kristian Lee-Him	MNK Izola
Sweden	Division 1	Dominic Adams	Oskarshamns AIK

North & Central America, Caribbean (CONCACAF)
Country	League	Player	Club
Costa Rica	Primera División	Aubrey David	Deportivo Saprissa
El Salvador	Primera División	Wesley John	UES
El Salvador	Primera División	Willis Plaza	Alianza
El Salvador	Primera División	Kordell Samuel	Chalatenango
El Salvador	Segunda División	Akil Pompey	Once Municipal
Mexico	Ascenso MX	Jerrell Britto	Murciélagos
Mexico	Ascenso MX	Yohance Marshall	Murciélagos
Puerto Rico	Liga Nacional de Fútbol	Osei Telesford	Criollos de Caguas
United States	Major League Soccer	Cordell Cato	San Jose Earthquakes
United States	Major League Soccer	Nick DeLeon	D.C. United
United States	Major League Soccer	Shannon Gomez	New York City
United States	Major League Soccer	Joevin Jones	Chicago Fire
United States	Major League Soccer	Kevin Molino	Orlando City
United States	Major League Soccer	Mekeil Williams	Colorado Rapids
United States	North American Soccer League	Kevan George	Jacksonville Armada FC
United States	North American Soccer League	Julius James	Fort Lauderdale Strikers
United States	North American Soccer League	Kareem Moses	Carolina RailHawks
United States	USL Pro	Trevin Caesar	Orange County Blues
United States	USL Pro	Tyler David	Saint Louis FC
United States	USL Pro	Ataullah Guerra	Charleston Battery
United States	USL Pro	Neveal Hackshaw	Charleston Battery
United States	USL Pro	Greg Ranjitsingh	Louisville City FC
United States	USL Pro	Darren Toby	Charlotte Eagles

== National teams ==
The Trinidad and Tobago men's and women's national soccer teams represent Trinidad and Tobago in international competition. The men's national team competes in the FIFA World Cup and the FIFA Confederations Cup, in addition to the CFU Caribbean Cup, CONCACAF Gold Cup and other competitions by invitation. The women's national team competes in the FIFA Women's World Cup, and the Summer Olympics, in addition to the CONCACAF Women's Championship and other competitions by invitation.

In recent years, the men's national team have been the most successful in the Caribbean, having qualified for the only 2006 FIFA World Cup and have won the CFU's Caribbean Cup 8 times since it was founded in 1990. By claiming the Caribbean Cup in 1989, 1992, 1994, 1995, 1996, 1997, 1999 and 2001, Trinidad and Tobago have qualified for the CONCACAF Gold Cup more than any other Caribbean nation. Though the national team have never claimed the Gold Cup title, their best finish came in the 1973 CONCACAF Championship when they finished runners-up to Haiti. The Trinidad and Tobago women's national team competed in their first international match in 1991 with a 3-1 victory over Mexico. The women's team have yet to qualify for the FIFA Women's World Cup with their best performance in the CONCACAF Women's Championship coming in the 1991 when they finished in third place.

In addition to the Trinidad and Tobago national team, the island of Tobago also has an official football team that represents the island. The team is not affiliated with FIFA, CONCACAF, nor the CFU and as a result may not enter any of the organisation's football competitions.

== Football stadiums in Trinidad and Tobago ==
The 20,000-capacity Queen's Park Oval is the largest non-football venue in Trinidad and Tobago. The stadium is used mostly for cricket.

#	Stadium	Main sport	Capacity	Tenants	Image
1	Hasely Crawford Stadium	Association football	23,000	Trinidad and Tobago national football team, San Juan Jabloteh F.C.	
2	Ato Boldon Stadium	Association football	10,000		
3	Larry Gomes Stadium	Association football	10,000		
4	Manny Ramjohn Stadium	Association football	10,000		

== Attendances ==
The average attendance per top-flight football league season and the club with the highest average attendance:

Season	League average	Best club	Best club average
2023	255	Defence Force	523

Source: League page on Wikipedia

== See also ==
- Trinidad and Tobago football league system
- List of football clubs in Trinidad and Tobago
- Lists of stadiums
