= Lenny Taylor =

Lenny Taylor may refer to:

- Lenny Taylor (American football)
- Lenny Taylor (football coach)
