= Club Sando FC (women) =

Trinidad and Tobago football club

Club Sando
- Full name: Club Sando Football Club
- Founded: 1990 (women's 2014)
- Head coach: Arnold Murphy
- League: WoLF
- Website: https://clubsando.wixsite.com/csfc

Club Sando Football Club or Club Sando is a women's football club in Trinidad and Tobago from San Fernando. Next to the women's team the club has a men's team.

== History ==
The club was founded in 1990 and in 1991 the first competitive men's team was established. The women's team was founded in 2014. In 2019 the club won the WoLF championship.

=== Current squad ===
As of 12 July 2020

Note: Flags indicate national team as defined under FIFA eligibility rules; some limited exceptions apply. Players may hold more than one non-FIFA nationality.

No. / Pos. / Nation / Player; — / DF / (Trinidad and Tobago) TRI / Khadisha Debesette	No. / Pos. / Nation / Player; — / FW / (Trinidad and Tobago) TRI / Dennecia Prince
