= Bitch =

Bitch may refer to:

- Bitch (slang), a vulgar derogatory term used primarily referring to women, but is often directed towards men as well
- A female dog or other canine

Bitch or bitches may also refer to:

== Arts and media ==
=== Film and television ===
- Bitch (film), a 2017 dark comedy film starring Marianna Palka
- The Bitch (film), a 1979 film starring Joan Collins
- "Bitches" (Pushing Daisies), an episode of Pushing Daisies

=== Music ===
==== Performers ====
- Bitch (band), an American heavy metal band
- Bitch, one half of American musical group Bitch and Animal

==== Albums ====
- Bitch (album), 2026 release by Lizzo

==== Songs ====
- "Bitch" (Rolling Stones song), 1971
- "Bitch" (Meredith Brooks song), 1997
- "Bitch" (E-40 song), 2010
- "Bitches" (song), 2018 recording by Tove Lo
- "B.I.T.C.H.", 2020 song by Megan Thee Stallion
- "Bitch", 1998 song by Sevendust from the album Sevendust
- "Bitch", 2011 song by Toxic Holocaust from the album Conjure and Command
- "Bitches", 1999 song by Insane Clown Posse featuring Ol' Dirty Bastard and the Jerky Boys from the album The Amazing Jeckel Brothers
- "Bitches", 2000 song by Mindless Self Indulgence from the album Frankenstein Girls Will Seem Strangely Sexy
- "Bitches", 2010 song by Hollywood Undead from the EP Swan Songs Rarities
- "B.I.T.C.H. (Breaking In to Colored Houses)", 2013 song by Tech N9ne featuring T-Pain from the album Something Else
- "BITCH", 2025 song by Ayesha Erotica from the album Precum

=== Other media ===
- Bitch (magazine)
- "Bitch" (short story), by Roald Dahl
- The Bitch (novel), by Jackie Collins
- Bitch: In Praise of Difficult Women, 1998 non-fiction book by Elizabeth Wurtzel

== Geographical ==
- Bitch Creek, a stream in Idaho, U.S.
- Bitch Mountain, a mountain in New York, U.S.
- The Bitches, rocks near Ramsey Island, Pembrokeshire

== Other uses ==
- BITCH-100, or Black Intelligence Test of Cultural Homogeneity, a psychometric test
- Bitches (cards), one of the many nicknames for a pair of queens in card games

== See also ==
- Bitchin (disambiguation)
- Bitching (disambiguation)
