= Bitchin =

Bitchin may refer to:

- Ali Bitchin (1560–1645), Italian-born Algerian privateer
- Bitchin', a 2007 album by The Donnas
- Bitchin, a 1999 album by Susan and the Surftones
- Bitchin', a 2002 EP by We Are Scientists

== See also ==
- Bitch (disambiguation)
- Bitching (disambiguation)
