= Elliot Millington =

Vincentian football manager (born 1976)

Personal information
- Date of birth: 1954
- Place of birth: Saint Vincent and the Grenadines
- Date of death: 17 July 2023 (aged 68–69)
- Place of death: New York City, United States
- Position: Midfielder

International career
Years	Team	Apps	(Gls)
1977–1988	Saint Vincent and the Grenadines		

Managerial career
- 1990–1992: Saint Vincent and the Grenadines

Elliot Millington (1954 - 17 July 2023) was a Vincentian football manager and footballer.

== Life and career ==
Millington was born in 1954 in Saint Vincent and the Grenadines. He had five siblings. He was the brother of Saint Vincent and the Grenadines international Oswald Millington. He attended Sion Hill Government School in Saint Vincent and the Grenadines. After that, he attended Emmanuel High School in Saint Vincent and the Grenadines. He worked as a plumber. He mainly operated as a midfielder. He was known for his passing ability.

Millington was a Saint Vincent and the Grenadines youth international. He played for the Saint Vincent and the Grenadines national under-20 football team at the 1974 Caribbean Youth Championship. He was vice-captain of the team. He was a Saint Vincent and the Grenadines international. He captained the team. He helped them achieve second place at the 1979 CFU Championship. In 1990, he was appointed manager of the Saint Vincent and the Grenadines national football team. After retiring from football, he moved with his family to the United States. He was married. He had two daughters and two sons. He died on 17 July 2023 in New York City, United States.
