= Shane Jordan =

English vegetarian chef and author

- Born: United Kingdom
- Occupations: Chef, author
- Writing career
- Genres: Waste management, cooking
- Notable work: Food Waste Philosophy,
- Website: foodwastephilosophy.com

Shane Jordan is an English vegetarian chef and author based in Bristol, recognised for minimising food waste by using leftover edible fruit and vegetable skins in creative dishes. He has been described as a "pioneer" for his imaginative use of food waste in restaurants and has written a cookery book detailing his alternative approach. Promoting sustainability outside the kitchen, he has partnered with a host of waste UK waste initiatives, including Vegfest UK, FoodCycle, Love Food, Hate Waste and Waste & Resources Action Programme.

== Career ==
After leaving finishing school in Bristol, Shane studied youth work at the City of Bristol College. After graduating, he became a mentor in a young offenders' institution located in Bristol and also worked in local youth centres, teaching chess and cooking classes. He is now a part time chef in Bristol at Arc Cafe and works freelance, teaching cooking at universities and Festivals as well as working with a variety of UK waste initiatives.

== Alternative cooking ==
Jordan has been recognised as an innovative chef, creating recipes from food waste such as banana skins, cauliflower stalks and potato skins. This alternative approach to cooking is aimed at reducing waste on landfill sites. His cookery book Food Waste Philosophy explains this approach.
