= Bitching =

Bitching may refer to:

- A form of the word bitch
- "Bitching", a song by The Stranglers from No More Heroes

== See also ==
- Bitchin (disambiguation)
