= Bitch Mountain =

Mountain in the United States

- Location within New York Adirondack Park Location within the United States

Highest point
- Elevation: 2,625 ft (800 m)
- Coordinates: 44°21′56″N 73°39′06″W

Geography
- Location: Essex County, New York
- Topo map: USGS Jay Mountain

Bitch Mountain is a summit in Essex County, New York, in the United States. With an elevation of 2,625 feet (800 m), Bitch Mountain is the 527th highest summit in the state of New York.

Bitch Mountain has been noted for its unusual place name.
