= Kaydion Gabriel =

Trinidad and Tobago footballer

Personal information
- Date of birth: 1 December 1990 (age 35)
- Place of birth: Trinidad and Tobago
- Positions: Defender; midfielder; winger; striker

Senior career*
Years	Team	Apps	(Gls)
-2012/13	North East Stars F.C.		(2)
	Central F.C.		(8+)

International career
2015	Trinidad and Tobago	1	(0)
- * Club domestic league appearances and goals

Kaydion Gabriel (born 1 December 1990 in Trinidad and Tobago) is a Trinidadian footballer.

== Career ==
Able to operate as a defender, midfielder, winger, or forward, Gabriel was nicknamed "Drogba" after the Ivory Coast international Didier Drogba by his teammates.

Gabriel won 3 Trinidadian top flight titles in a row with Central, in 2014/14, 2015/16, and 2016/17.
