= Bitsch =

Bitsch is a surname of German origin. Notable people with the surname include:

- Emil Bitsch (1916–1944), German Luftwaffe flying ace
- Jana Bitsch Messerschidt (born 1990), German karateka
- Jørgen Bitsch (1922–2005), Danish writer
- Marcel Bitsch (1921–2011), French composer
- Mia Bitsch, German karateka
- Noah Bitsch (born 1989), German karateka

== See also ==
- Bitche (German: Bitsch), a town and commune of the Moselle département, France
- Bitsch, a municipality in canton Valais, Switzerland
- Bytča (German: Bitsch), a town in Slovakia
