= Urtis Blackett =

Saint Vincent and the Grenadines footballer

Personal information
- Full name: Urtis Orlando Blackett
- Date of birth: 24 March 1973 (age 53)
- Place of birth: Kingstown, Saint Vincent and the Grenadines
- Position: Goalkeeper

Senior career*
Years	Team	Apps	(Gls)
- GMA Kingstown Frenches

International career
2000	Saint Vincent and the Grenadines	1	(0)
- * Club domestic league appearances and goals

Urtis Orlando Blackett (born 24 March 1973) is a Saint Vincentian retired international footballer who played as a goalkeeper. (Note: Urtis Blackett at WorldFootball.net)

== Career ==
Blackett earned one cap for the Saint Vincent and the Grenadines national team, coming in a 2000 friendly against Costa Rica. He had been in the squad for the 1996 CONCACAF Gold Cup, but did not make an appearance as Fitzgerald Bramble started both matches at the tournament for Saint Vincent.

== Retirement ==
After retiring as a player, Blackett stayed involved in football as a coach. He served as an assistant coach for the Saint Vincent and the Grenadines women's national team at the 2016 Windward Islands Tournament and for the men's under-20 national team at the 2018 CONCACAF U-20 Championship.

Outside of football, Blackett lived in East Kingstown and was employed as a sales worker. In August 2020, he won $5,800 through the lottery in Saint Vincent and the Grenadines.
