= Keith Ollivierre =

Vincentian football coach

Personal information
- Date of birth: 13 April 1971 (age 55)
- Place of birth: St. Vincent and the Grenadines
- Position: Defender

Senior career*
Years	Team	Apps	(Gls)
- Camdonia Chelsea SC

International career
1992–1996	St. Vincent and the Grenadines		

Managerial career
- Camdonia Chelsea SC
- St. Vincent and the Grenadines (technical director)
- 2016: St. Vincent and the Grenadines
- * Club domestic league appearances and goals

Keith Ollivierre (born 13 April 1971) is a Vincentian football coach. He served as the Saint Vincent and the Grenadines Football Federation's technical director and head coach in 2016. However, he was lambasted for assuming those two roles at the same time.

Undertaking the role of the Saint Vincent and the Grenadines head coach ahead of the 2017 Caribbean Cup qualification second round, his team were knocked out of the competition after losing to the Saint Kitts and Nevis by one goal. After the match, Ollivierre lamented his charges' wastefulness and claimed they should have advanced further. Head coach of the Vincy Heat in their 2018 FIFA World Cup qualifying campaign as well, he managed his team in two straight losses, losing 6-0 to the United States and 9-3 to Guatemala.
