= Dexter Browne =

Saint Vincent and the Grenadines footballer

Personal information
- Date of birth: 28 January 1976 (age 50)
- Place of birth: Saint Vincent and the Grenadines
- Position: Defender

International career
Years	Team	Apps	(Gls)
1996–2007	Saint Vincent and the Grenadines		

Dexter Browne is an international footballer, who played as a defender.

== Biography ==
Browne was born in Saint Vincent and the Grenadines. He played for the Saint Vincent and the Grenadines national football team between 1996 and 2007. After the 2007 games he was one of several of the team to retire from international football.

He took part in the 1996 CONCACAF Gold Cup in the United States. He played two games in the competition: against Mexico, and Guatemala. In 2019 the team was honoured for being the only team to have got to the CONCACAF Gold Cup.
