= Cunupia F.C. =

Association football club in Trinidad and Tobago

Cunupia
- Full name: Cunupia Football Club
- Ground: Larry Gomes Stadium; Malabar, Trinidad and Tobago
- Capacity: 7,500
- League: TT Premier Football League
- 2025–26: TT Pro League, 10th

Cunupia F.C. is a Trinidadian professional football club, based in Cunupia, that plays in the TT Premier Football League. Once in the second division of Trinidad and Tobago football, they became a top flight team after being accepted to the then 2019-20 TT Pro League season. They finished bottom of the shortened season.

The club's colours are black and yellow.

== History ==
Cunupia won the 2016 Super League (second division) title, beating University of Trinidad and Tobago to the title on head-to-head.

Cunupia finished fourth in the second division and won the second division knock-out in 2018 and was accepted to the top league in February 2019, although had their bid initially un-accepted in March 2019.

In 2022 the team played in the Ascension League as Trinidad and Tobago did not have a professional league.

The team returned to the top flight for the 2023 season after COVID interrupted the Trinidadian pro league.
