= Cornelius Huggins =

Vincentian footballer

- Huggins in 2008

Personal information
- Full name: Cornelius Bernard Huggins
- Date of birth: January 7, 1975 (age 51)
- Place of birth: Kingstown, St. Vincent and the Grenadines
- Height: 6 ft 1 in (1.85 m)
- Position: Centre back

Team information
- Current team: St. Vincent and the Grenadines (coach)

Senior career*
Years	Team	Apps	(Gls)
1995–2002	Pastures United FC		
2003	Virginia Beach Mariners		
2004–2008	Kedah FA	116	(3)
2008	Vancouver Whitecaps		
2011	Hope International FC		

International career
1995–2011	St. Vincent and the Grenadines	96	(0)
- * Club domestic league appearances and goals

Cornelius Bernard Huggins (born June 1, 1974), also known as Outlaw between fans, is a footballer from Saint Vincent and the Grenadines formerly playing as a centre back and a vice-captain for Kedah FA in the Malaysian Super League.

== Career ==
His game is valued highly by the Kedah FA management who have placed their trust on him in defence starting from 2004 season. He was a part of the squad that won historical double treble titles.

== International ==
Huggins has made numerous appearances for the Saint Vincent and the Grenadines national football team, including playing at the 1996 CONCACAF Gold Cup. He is also the most-capped Saint Vincentian defender in international competitions especially in the Caribbean Cup.

== Honours ==
Kedah

- Malaysia Cup: 2006–07, 2007–08
- Malaysian Super League: 2006–07, 2007–08
- Malaysian Premier League: 2005–06
- Malaysian FA Cup: 2006–07, 2007–08
