= TT Women's League Football =

- Country: Trinidad and Tobago
- Confederation: CONCACAF
- Number of clubs: 10
- Level on pyramid: 1
- Current champions: Club Sando (2019)
- Current: 2026 TT Women's League Football

The TT Women's League Football, or WoLF is the top level of the women's football system in Trinidad and Tobago. Contested by 10 clubs. WoLF is also the body responsible for the development of the women's game on Trinidad and Tobago.

== Teams ==
- Club Sando (San Fernando)
- St Augustine (Unknown)
- Trincity Nationals (Unknown)
- QPCC (Unknown)
- Defence Force (Unknown)
- Police (Unknown)
- UTT (Unknown)
- Jewels (Unknown)
- Tobago Chicas (Unknown)
- St Augustine Juniors (Unknown)

== Champions ==
- 1985 Rossi Potentials
- 1986-90 not known
- 1991 Rossi Potentials
- 1992 Rossi Potentials
- 1993-97 not known
- 1998 United Petrotrin
- 1999 United Petrotrin
- 2000 United Petrotrin
- 2001 Stingrays
- 2002 unknown
- 2003 unknown
- 2004 Joe Public (aka Jane Public)
- 2005 Joe Public (aka Jane Public)
- 2006 Real Dimension
- 2007 Real Dimension
- 2008 Real Dimension
- 2009 Tobago FC
- 2010 Real Dimension
- 2011 league abandoned
- 2012 Real Dimension
- 2013 not known
- 2014 St. Ann's Rangers FC
- 2015 St. Augustine FC [*]
- 2016 Real Dimension
- 2017 Real Dimension
- 2018 not known
- 2019: Club Sando
- 2020: not held
- 2021: unknown
