= Prison Service F.C. =

Football club based in Arouca

Prison Service Football Club, also known as Prisons F.C., is a football club based in Arouca, Trinidad and Tobago. Its players include both prison officers and civilians and prisoners. As of 2023, the club competes in the TT Premier Football League (TTPFL).

In 2020, Prisons F.C. were awarded the League Trophy in the T&T Super League.

== See also ==
- WASA F.C.
- Defence Force F.C.
- Police F.C. (Trinidad and Tobago)
