= Queen's Park Cricket Club =

Cricket club

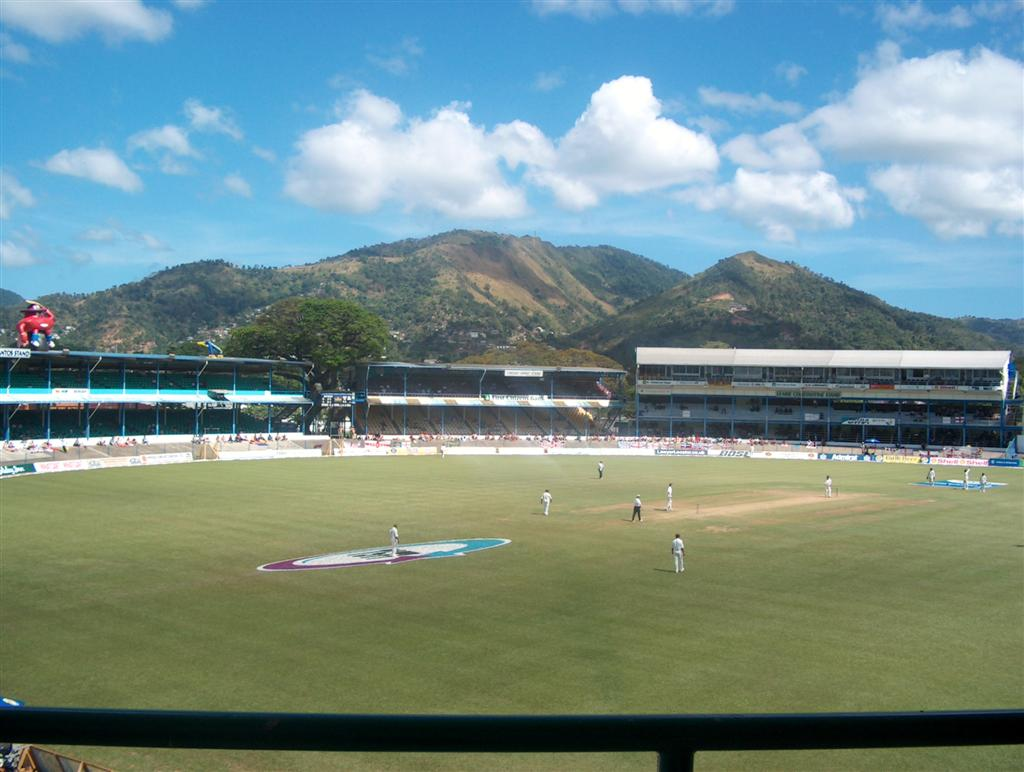
The Queen's Park Oval, which is owned by the QPCC.

The Queen's Park Cricket Club (QPCC) is a cricket club in Trinidad and Tobago, current owner of the Queen's Park Oval, having previously played at the Queen's Park Savannah since its founding in 1891. During the first decades of the twentieth century, the private Queen's Park Oval was the most exclusive cricket ground and club on the island. C. L. R. James records that "they were for the most part white and often wealthy" and that "a black man in the Queen's Park was rare and usually anonymous." The Queen's Park club was "the big shot" of the local cricket on the island, and matches against touring English sides were the mainstay of cricket at the ground. The club also contributed to the growth of cricket on the island, for trial matches were held on weekends while a tour was in progress, and local talent was invited to play.
