= Kevon Woodley =

Trinidadian footballer (born 1986)

Personal information
- Date of birth: 6 July 1986 (age 40)
- Place of birth: Trinidad and Tobago
- Position: Forward

Team information
- Current team: Morvant Caledonia United

Senior career*
Years	Team	Apps	(Gls)
–2008	United Petrotrin		
2009	W Connection		
2010	Tobago United		
2011	Morvant Caledonia United		
2011–2014	Malabar		
2015–2016	Club Sando		
2017–2020	Cunupia		
2022	Western Tigers		
2023	Cunupia		
2023	San Juan Jabloteh		
2024–	Morvant Caledonia United		

International career
2024–	Trinidad and Tobago	7	(1)
- * Club domestic league appearances and goals

Kevon Woodley (born 6 July 1986) is a Trinidadian footballer who plays as a forward for Morvant Caledonia United.

== Club career ==
Woodley started his career with Trinidadian side United Petrotrin. In 2009, he signed for Trinidadian side W Connection. In 2010, he signed for Trinidadian side Tobago United. In 2011, he signed for Trinidadian side Morvant Caledonia United. In 2011, he signed for Trinidadian side Malabar. In 2015, he signed for Trinidadian side Club Sando In 2017, he signed for Trinidadian side Cunupia.

In 2022, he signed for Trinidadian side Western Tigers. In 2023, Woodley returned to Trinidadian side Cunupia. He was regarded as one of the club's most important players. After that, he signed for Trinidadian side San Juan Jabloteh. In 2024, he returned to Trinidadian side Morvant Caledonia United for the second time.

== International career ==
Woodley is a Trinidad and Tobago international. He played for the Trinidad and Tobago national football team for 2026 FIFA World Cup qualification. He is also a Trinidad and Tobago beach soccer international. He has been the all-time top scorer for the Trinidad and Tobago national beach soccer team.

== Personal life ==
Woodley was born on 6 July 1986 in Trinidad and Tobago. He is a native of Arima, Trinidad and Tobago. He played cricket as a child. He started playing football at the age of seven. He practiced football on the beach as a child. He attended Roxborough Secondary School in Trinidad and Tobago. He has been married. He has two children. He has been nicknamed "Showtime".

== Career statistics ==
=== International ===
Appearances and goals by national team and year
National team	Year	Apps	Goals
Trinidad and Tobago	2024	7	1
Total		7	1

Scores and results list Trinidad and Tobago's goal tally first, score column indicates score after each Woodley goal.

List of international goals scored by Kevon Woodley
No.	Date	Venue	Opponent	Score	Result	Competition
1	15 May 2024	Hasely Crawford Stadium, Port of Spain, Trinidad and Tobago	Guyana	2–0	2–0	Friendly
