= Plymouth, Trinidad and Tobago =

- Village
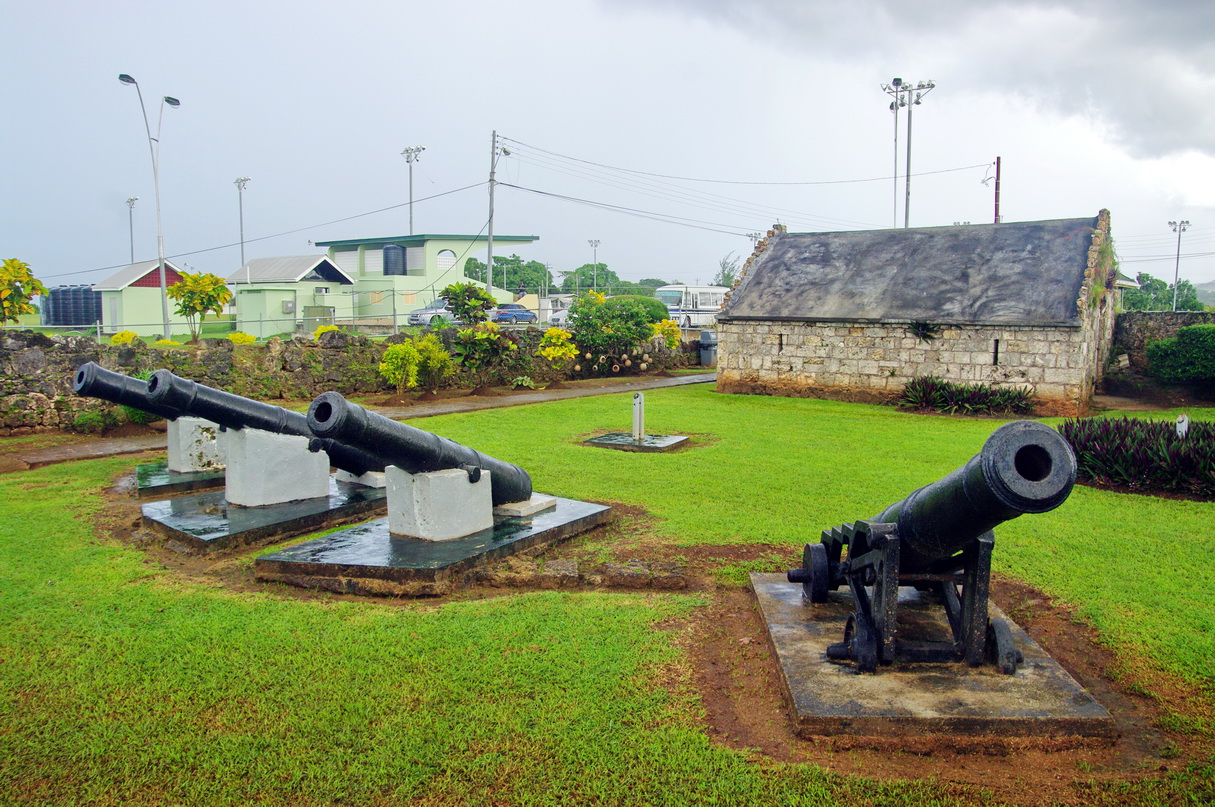
- Fort James, Plymouth

- Location of Plymouth on Tobago island Plymouth, Trinidad and Tobago (Lesser Antilles)
- Coordinates: 11°13′13″N 60°46′29″W
- Country: Trinidad and Tobago

Plymouth is a village on the north-west coast of the island of Tobago, Trinidad and Tobago. It was first settled by Courlanders.
