= Trinidad and Tobago Football Association =

Sports governing body

CONCACAF
- Short name: TTFA
- Founded: 1908; 118 years ago
- Headquarters: Couva
- FIFA affiliation: 1964
- CONCACAF affiliation: 1964
- President: David John- Williams
- Website: thettfa.com

The Trinidad and Tobago Football Association (TTFA) is the governing body of football in Trinidad and Tobago. It is based in Port of Spain, Trinidad. It is a member of FIFA and is responsible for governing amateur and professional football and including the men's and women's national teams. The TTFA is also responsible for sanctioning referees and football tournaments for leagues in Trinidad and Tobago.

The association was known as the Trinidad and Tobago Football Federation (TTFF) between 1992 and 1 July 2013.

== History ==
The first World Cup qualification campaign for the national team began in 1965 in preparation for the 1966 World Cup. The team failed to qualify after finishing last in their group in the First Round of qualification. However, in 1973, Trinidad and Tobago came within two points of qualifying for the 1974 World Cup in controversial fashion. Trinidad and Tobago lost a crucial game on 4 December 1973 against hosts Haiti 2–1 having five of their goals disallowed.

It was not until qualification for the 1990 World Cup that the national team would be in contention again. Needing only a draw to qualify in their final home game against the United States, Trinidad and Tobago's hopes were dashed by Paul Caligiuri who scored the game's only goal in the 38th minute to give the United States the last qualification spot for the World Cup.

Trinidad and Tobago qualified for the 2006 World Cup in Germany, its first-ever qualification for the tournament. They became the smallest country to qualify for the FIFA World Cup in 2006, succeeding Haiti for the title. In Germany, Trinidad and Tobago were grouped with England, Sweden and Paraguay in Group B. The team earned some international respect after a draw with Sweden in their opening game and managing to hold England scoreless for 83 minutes. Trinidad and Tobago finished with their first-ever point from World Cup play after finishing 0–1–2 for the tournament.

=== 2006 World Cup players' bonus dispute ===
Following the 2006 World Cup, the national team was thrown into turmoil by a dispute between the players from the World Cup squad and the TTFF. Prior to the competition, the players had agreed to a bonus scheme with the TTFF, where the players would share 50% of the federation's income from the World Cup.

Following the competition, the TTFF declared the income and expenses of TT$18.25 million and TT$17.97 million, respectively. This left TT$282,952 in net revenue and offered each player TT$5600, whereby the players rejected the offer. Subsequently, the TTFF revised their figure to TT$950,000. The amount the Federation received during their qualification campaign prior to the 2006 World Cup. The players also rejected the revised offer and requested to see the TTFF's unaudited accounts. The Federation refused the player's request.

The sixteen players were Marvin Andrews, Chris Birchall, Atiba Charles, Ian Cox, Cornell Glen, Cyd Gray, Shaka Hislop, Kelvin Jack, Avery John, Stern John, Kenwyne Jones, Collin Samuel, Brent Sancho, Aurtis Whitley, Evans Wise, and Anthony Wolfe. The players claim to have been blacklisted as none had been selected to represent the national team since a friendly against Austria in November 2006. The TTFF claimed that the decision was left to the coach, Wim Rijsbergen.

On 30 June 2007, the players initiated a lawsuit against the TTFF. Following an August 2007 inquiry by their lawyers to the Trinidad and Tobago government under the Freedom of Information Act, it was revealed that the TTFF had understated its income by at least TT$173.5 million. This was not including a TT$32 million bonus paid by the government and television revenue from friendly matches played in Europe prior to the World Cup. As a result, the players were deprived of at least TT$6.5 million each.

Following the inquiry, the TTFF immediately lifted its ban on the players, and agreed to go to arbitration in London rather than to court. On 18 May 2008, British arbitrator Ian Mill QC ruled that the Soca Warriors were entitled to 50% of the profits of the Federation obtained from 2006 World Cup qualifying, as well as friendlies prior to the World Cup. However, on 9 Jan 2009 the proceedings never progressed as the TTFF were no longer interested in arbitration hearings in London and shifted their dispute to the Port of Spain Higher Court. The TTFF argued that the change was due to lawyers representing the 16 players breached the confidentiality clause in comments made to a local newspaper and other international media houses. A hearing of the application to lift the order which prevents the Port of Spain High Court from hearing the case is expected on 16 June 2009.

In February 2011 the High Court ruled that an interim payment of US$100 be paid to the footballers. The judge also rejected the accounting documents submitted by the TTFF.

In August 2012, the Federation relocated to new offices in Woodbroke as a consequence of having its equipment seized in a court order relating to unpaid payments.

The FIFA Council suspended the TTFA on 24 September 2020 after the federation filed a claim in a local court against FIFA's decision to appoint a normalisation committee to reform the TTFA.

The FIFA Council lifted the membership suspension on 19 November 2020 after the federation agreed to terminate all legal court action being pursued against FIFA. This consequently led to all FIFA membership rights being reinstated; this includes the inclusion in international football tournaments.

It is estimated that there in 2019 there was an outstanding debt level at the TTFA of TT$500 million owing to both footballing creditors such as the men's national team, and to non-footballing creditors including the backroom staff. It is understood a number of sponsors such as Caribbean Chemicals, AVEC, and Digicel were owed vast amounts of money through undelivered sponsorship agreements.

== Association staff ==
Name	Position	Source
(Trinidad and Tobago) Robert Hadad	President	
(Trinidad and Tobago) Judy Daniel	Vice President	
(Trinidad and Tobago) Amiel Mohammed	General Secretary	
n/a	Treasurer	
(Trinidad and Tobago) Dion La Foucade	Technical Director	
(Trinidad and Tobago) Dwight Yorke	Team Coach (Men's)	
(England) Damian Briggs	Team Coach (Women's)	
(Trinidad and Tobago) Shaun Fuentes	Media/Communications Manager	
n/a	Futsal Coordinator	
n/a	Referee Coordinator	

== Associations affiliated with TTFA ==
=== Adult level ===
1. Trinidad and Tobago men's national football team
2. Trinidad and Tobago women's national football team

=== Youth teams ===
1. Trinidad and Tobago U-23 men's national football team
2. Trinidad and Tobago U-20 men's national football team
3. Trinidad and Tobago U-17 men's national football team
4. Trinidad and Tobago U-15 men's national football team
5. Trinidad and Tobago U-20 women's national football team
6. Trinidad and Tobago U-19 women's national football team
7. Trinidad and Tobago U-17 women's national football team
8. Trinidad and Tobago U-15 women's national football team

=== Leagues and organizations ===
1. TT Pro League
2. National Super League
3. TT Women's League Football
4. Secondary Schools Football League
5. Primary Schools Football League
6. Trinidad and Tobago AYSO Youth League
7. Veteran Footballers Assoc

== Professional leagues ==
The TT Pro League is a first division football league in Trinidad and Tobago founded in 1999 and comprises eight teams. The Women's Football League is the top-level women's football league. It was established in 1986 and consists of 15 teams in two divisions, Premier and First.

The TTFF has also, since 1927, sponsored a nationwide tournament open to all TTFF affiliated clubs known as the FA Trophy.

== Awards ==
The association awards the Trinidad and Tobago Footballer of the Year yearly to a male and a female professional footballer. Below is a partial list of recipients of that award:

T&T Men's footballer of the year			T&T Women's footballer of the year		
Year	Player	Club	Year	Player	Club
1967	Sedley Joseph	Maple			
1983	Russell Latapy				
1985	Russell Latapy				
1989	Russell Latapy	Trintoc			
1996	Russell Latapy	FC Porto			
1998	Arnold Dwarika	Joe Public			
1999	Arnold Dwarika	Joe Public			
2000	Reynold Carrington	W Connection	2000	Leslie Ann James	Jane Public
2001	Arnold Dwarika	W Connection	2001	Leslie Ann James	Jane Public
2002	Stern John	Nottingham Forest	2002	Tasha St. Louis	Stingrays
2005	Kennya Cordner		2005	Dwight Yorke	Sydney FC
2007	Kenwyne Jones	Sunderland			
2008	Bassam Tomeh	Swansea	2008	Ahkeela Mollon	Charlotte Lady Eagles
2009	Not Awarded		2009	Not Awarded	
2010	Kenwyne Jones	Stoke City	2010	Kennya Cordner	Djurgården
2011
2012	Khaleem Hyland	Genk	2012	Kennya Cordner	Seattle Reign Reserves
2013	Kenwyne Jones	Stoke City	2013	Kennya Cordner	Seattle Reign
2019			2019	Kennya Cordner	IL Sandviken
2020			2020	Kennya Cordner	IL Sandviken
2021	Aubrey David	Deportivo Saprissa	2021	Kennya Cordner	Fenerbahçe S.K. (women's football)
2022	Levi García	AEK Athens	2022	Asha James	West Texas A&M Buffaloes

== See also ==
- Trinidad and Tobago national football team
- Trinidad and Tobago women's national football team
