= Biche =

- Village
- Location within Trinidad and Tobago
- Coordinates: 10.433°N 61.133°W
- Country: Trinidad and Tobago
- First inhabited: 1874

Government
  - Local Government Councilor: Glen Ram
- Elevation: 42 m (138 ft)

Population (2009)
  - Total: 3,055
- Time zone: UTC-4 (Eastern Caribbean)
- Area code: 868
- ISO 3166 code: TT

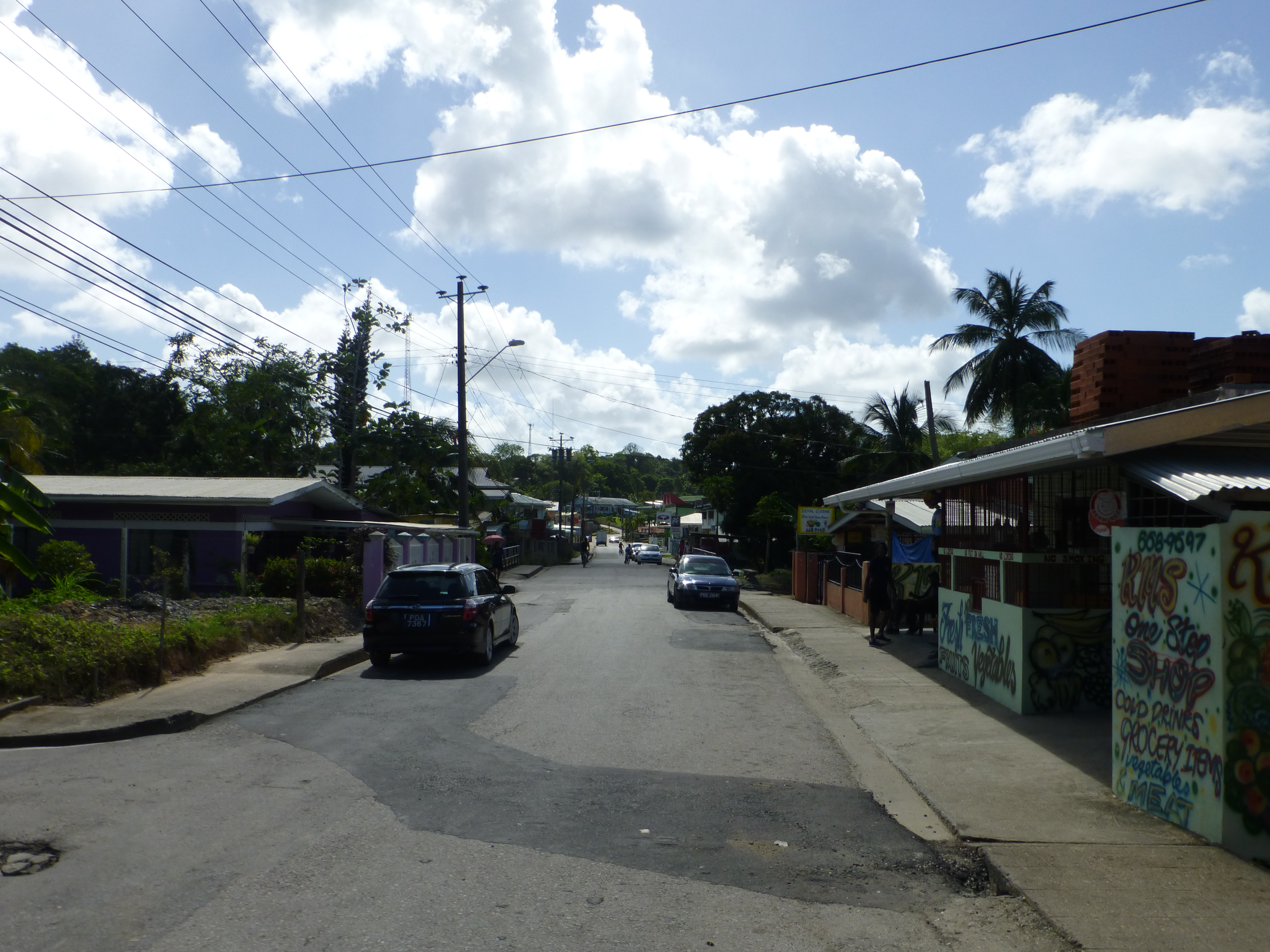
Biche

Biche is a village in east Trinidad and Tobago 18 kilometers south of Sangre Grande and 18 kilometers north of Rio Claro.

== Overview ==
Situated along the Cunapo Southern Main Road, Biche was first inhabited by a hunter and his teenage wife in 1874. There is little historical data to support the origins of this couple; however, the hunter's wife was believed to be named as Maria Gomez.

The name Biche derives from the French word biche, meaning deer or wild beast. In those times, hunters from Arima wandered into the area via the Nariva River and Nariva Swamp in search of wild animals.

Biche falls under the jurisdiction of the Rio Claro–Mayaro Regional Corporation, and has a population in excess of 4000.

Biche boasts of its own cable service and high school. The Biche Secondary School (formerly Biche High School ) was opened to students on September 5, 2011. There are presently students from forms one to five attending this school.

In recent times, the exploration of oil has given hope to the residents of Biche which over the years have seen the increase in the brain drain of its youths because of its location and lack of job opportunity besides gardening. Up to this time no oil has been found but the villagers remain optimistic that some will be found and thus boost the appeal of the town in terms of job availability. Cocoa beans are being cultivated in Biche, and as a project supported by the Alliance for Rural Communities (ARC) chocolate is being produced and sold in form of community-branded bars.

Biche is also known for its wild meat. It is one of the few places that one can still acquire cascadura in abundance.
