= Lenny Taylor (football coach) =

Jamaican football coach

Personal information
- Place of birth: Jamaica

College career
Years	Team	Apps	(Gls)
- New York City Community College
1970–1973	Long Island University		

Managerial career
- 1975–1980: Medgar Evers College
- 1981–1985: Florida Youth Soccer Association (instructor)
- 1983–1987: Lauderhill Lions (youth)
- 1992–1994: Hairoun Lions
- 1993–1996: Saint Vincent and the Grenadines
- 1997–1999: United States Youth Soccer Association (regional coach)
- 2000–2001: Saint Vincent and the Grenadines
- 2005–2008: Saint Kitts and Nevis (technical director)
- 2014–2015: Pompano Beach Football Club

Lenny Taylor is a Jamaican football coach who is last known to have coached Pompano Beach Football Club in the United States.

== Early life ==
Growing up poor in Kingston, Jamaica, Taylor had seven siblings and his father was a Christian carpenter.

== Coaching career ==
=== Saint Vincent and the Grenadines ===
Resigned as head coach of Saint Vincent and the Grenadines after the 1996 Gold Cup which saw his team lose both their group stage clashes.

Was disinterested in the idea of becoming the Saint Vincent and the Grenadines technical director again in 2016.

=== Saint Kitts and Nevis ===
The Saint Kitts and Nevis Football Association praised for choosing Taylor as their technical director in 2005, he ran the entire football development program there, also aiding youth players in their careers. However, by 2008, the Jamaican was discharged from his duties, inequitably according to some.
