= Zoran Vraneš =

Montenegrin football coach (born 1950)

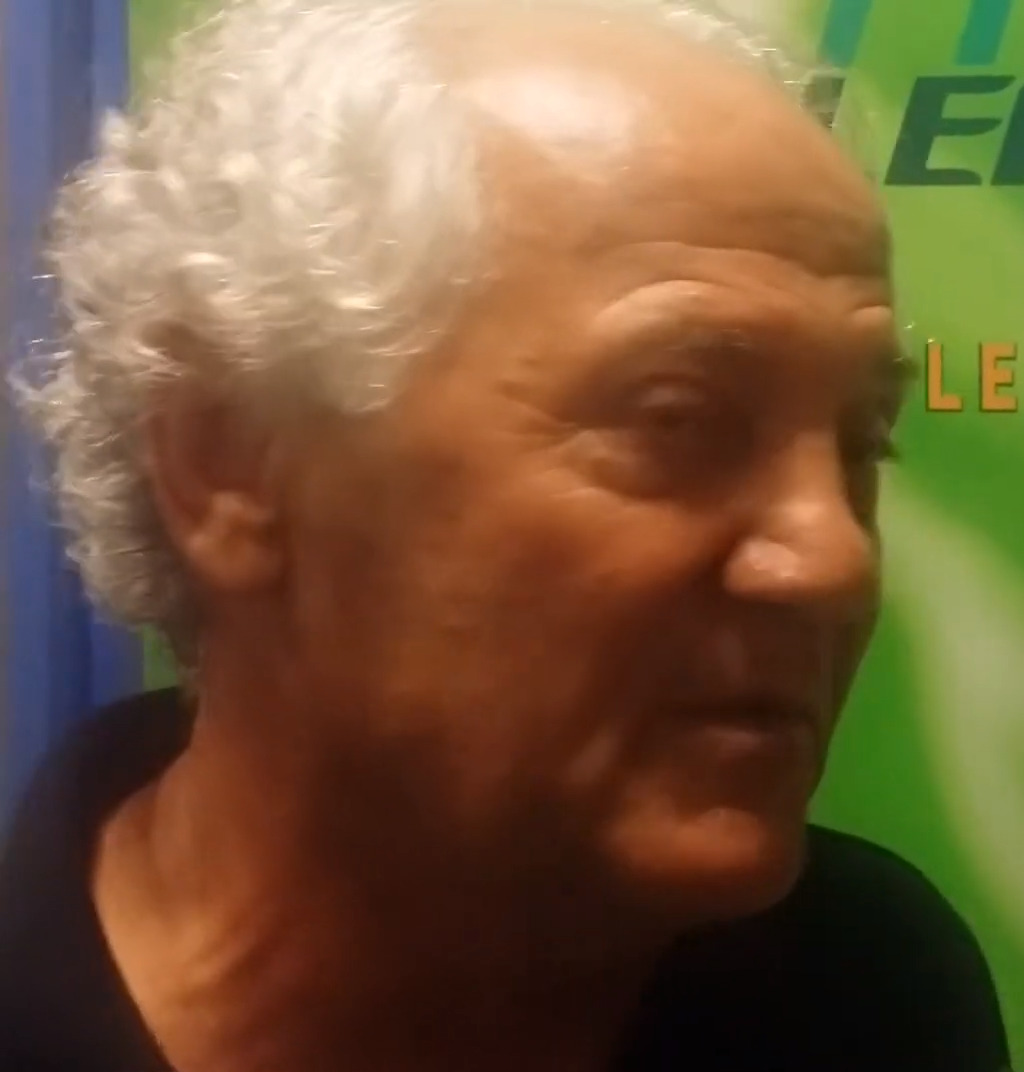
- Vraneš at an interview as Central FC coach in 2014

Personal information
- Date of birth: 14 September 1950 (age 76)
- Place of birth: Pljevlja, FPR Yugoslavia
- Position: Defender

Senior career*
Years	Team	Apps	(Gls)
1972–1973	Crvenka	9	(0)
1974–1975	Partizan	19	(1)
1975–1980	Šumadija Aranđelovac	102	(6)

Managerial career
- 1994: Rudar Pljevlja
- 1994–1996: Trinidad and Tobago
- 1998–2000: Antigua and Barbuda
- 2001–2002: Joe Public
- 2003: Trinidad and Tobago
- 2003–2004: Rudar Pljevlja
- 2004–2007: Saint Vincent and the Grenadines
- 2009–2010: Trinidad and Tobago (assistant)
- 2009–2010: Trinidad and Tobago U20
- 2014–2015: Central FC
- 2015–2016: Trinidad and Tobago U23
- 2018–2019: North East Stars
- * Club domestic league appearances and goals

Zoran Vraneš (Serbian Cyrillic: Зоран Вранеш; born 14 September 1950) is a Montenegrin former football coach and player.

== Playing career ==
Born in Pljevlja, SR Montenegro, then one of the republics constituting Yugoslavia, Vraneš first made his name as a player of Partizan and Šumadija.

== Coaching career ==
Vraneš coached Rudar Pljevlja. He then choached the Trinidad and Tobago national football team. He has received praise for helping to transform the defencemen of St Vincent and the Grenadines football into a formidable defensive team. He took six points in six games of FIFA World Cup qualifying but it proved insufficient. Then came a middling finish in the Caribbean Nations Cup, followed by the history-setting year of 2006, when they beat the Jamaica national football team in a 2–1 win. It was the first time that St Vincent ever beat Jamaica in football, and they won it with defence. However, the team was ultimately unable to win the championship, making it only to the 8-team finals.

== Honours ==
Trinidad and Tobago

- CONCACAF Gold Cup: 1996
