= WASA F.C. =

Association football club from Trinidad and Tobago

WASA FC is a football club from St. Joseph in Trinidad and Tobago.

They were founded in 1996 and competes in the National Super League in Trinidad, of which they emerged champions in 2012.

== Awards ==
- 1998 – Eastern Football Association League Champions
- 1999 – Eastern Football Association League Champions
- 2001 – Eastern Football Association League Champions
- 2002 – Eastern Football Association League Champions
- 2004 – Eastern Football Association League Champions
- 2006 – National FA Cup Champions
- 2007 – National Super League Champions
- 2008 – 3rd Place National Super League; President's Cup Champions (EFA)
- 2010 – Eastern Football Association League Cup Champions
- 2011 – Eastern Football Association Challenge Cup Champions; President's Cup (EFA); 2nd Place National Super League;
- 2012 – Super League Champions
- 2023 - 3rd Place Indonesia Super League
- 2023 - International Bonge Cup Champions

== See also ==
- Prison Service F.C.
- Defence Force F.C.
- Police F.C. (Trinidad and Tobago)
