= Cunupia =

- Neighbourhood
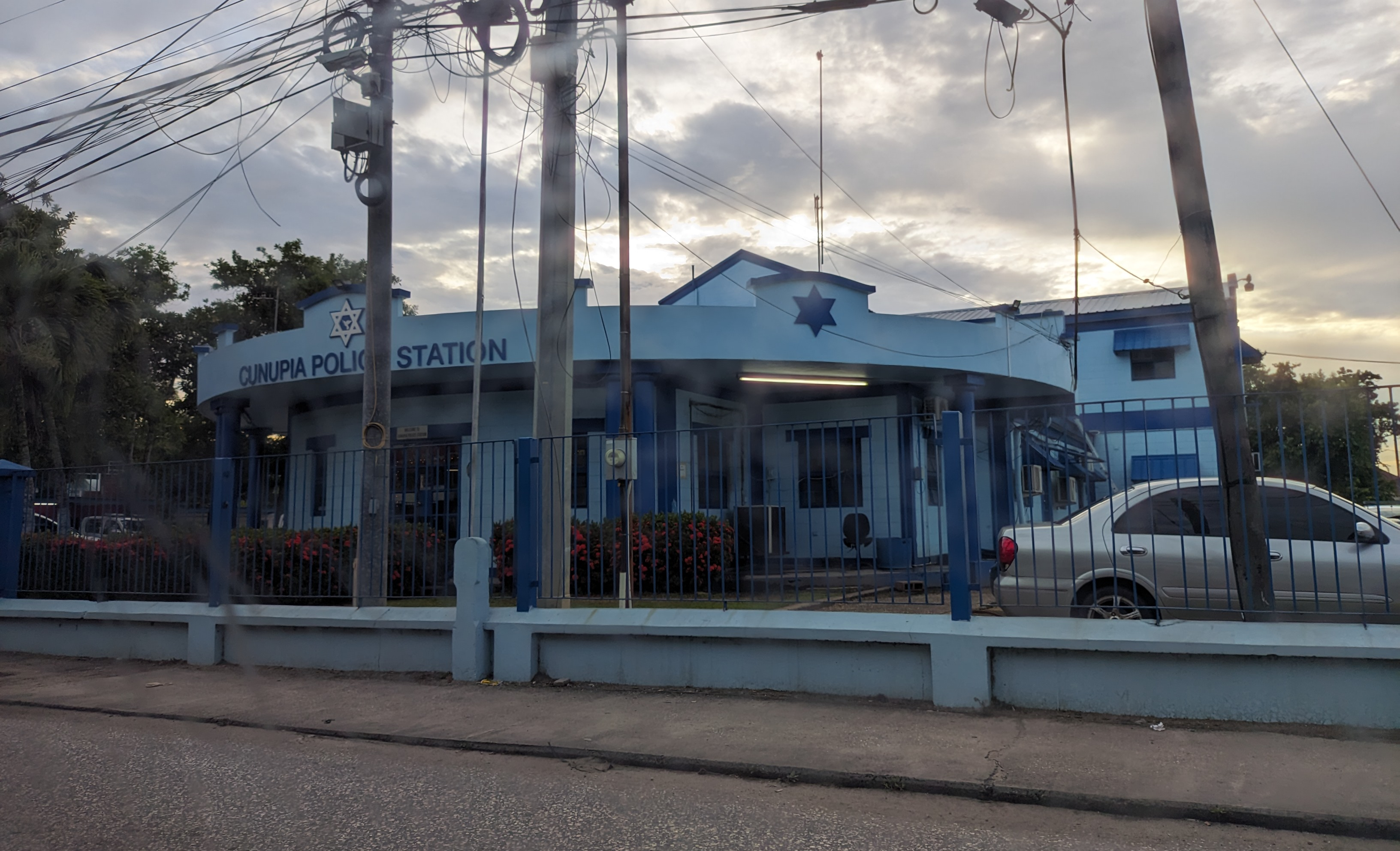
- Cunupia police station (2024)

- Location within Trinidad and Tobago
- Coordinates: 10°33′N 61°22′W
- Country: Trinidad and Tobago
- Borough: Chaguanas
- Settled: 1797
- Incorporated into Chaguanas: September 13, 1990
- Named for: the Spanish word "conupia"

Population (2011)
  - Total: 8,768
- Time zone: UTC−4 (AST)
- Postal code: 52xxxx
- Area code: 868
- Telephone Exchange: 693

Cunupia is a town in central Trinidad. It is part of the Borough of Chaguanas. Cunupia is just northeast of Chaguanas proper. Like Chaguanas itself, Cunupia has experienced rapid growth in recent years, especially in terms of residential developments.

== Notable People ==
- Seepersad Naipaul, writer, journalist, and father of V. S. Naipaul
