= 2013 Trinidad and Tobago Goal Shield =

2013 Lucozade Sport Goal Shield
Trinidad and Tobago Goal Shield

Tournament details
- Country: Trinidad and Tobago
- Teams: 8

Final positions
- Champions: W Connection
- Runners-up: North East Stars

Tournament statistics
- Matches played: 7
- Goals scored: 21 (3 per match)
- Top goal scorer(s): Kevon Carter; Joevin Jones (3 goals each)

Awards
- Best player: Alejandro Figueroa

The 2013 Trinidad and Tobago Goal Shield was the fourth season of the Lucozade Sport Goal Shield, which is a knockout tournament competition for Trinidad and Tobago teams competing in the TT Pro League. Caledonia AIA entered as the cup holders having defeated Defence Force 3–1 in the 2012 final. Continuing from previous seasons, the competition not only allowed the winner and runner-up healthy purses at the end of the tournament, but more so give an added incentive for more goals to be scored throughout the tournament. In particular, the winner of the competition was awarded TT$20,000 plus an additional TT$3,000 for every goal scored in the final, TT$2,000 for every goal in the semifinals, and TT$1,000 for each goal scored in the quarterfinals. Whereas, the runner-up was awarded TT$10,000 plus TT$1,500 for every goal scored in the final, TT$1,000 for every goal in the semifinals, and TT$500 for each goal scored in the quarterfinals.

== Qualification ==
For the third consecutive season, all eight teams competing in the TT Pro League entered the competition at the quarterfinal round. Seeding was determined from the league standings after the conclusion of the second round of fixtures during the 2012–13 season. Defence Force entered the competition as the league leader and top seeded team in the competition. The remaining top seeds were Caledonia AIA, W Connection, and North East Stars after finishing in second, third, and fourth place, respectively, in the league table at the time of the draw.

The draw for the quarterfinals took place on 10 April 2013 at the VIP Lounge of the Hasely Crawford Stadium, in Mucurapo. The quarterfinal match-ups resulted in Defence Force facing bottom of the league table T&TEC at Ato Boldon Stadium in Couva. The later match at Ato Boldon Stadium featured W Connection against Police. In the other two quarterfinal matches hosted at Marvin Lee Stadium in Macoya, Caledonia AIA faced St. Ann's Rangers and North East Stars against Central FC.

== Schedule ==
The schedule for the 2013 Lucozade Sport Goal Shield, as announced by the TT Pro League:

Round	Date	Matches	Clubs	New entries this round
Quarterfinals	12 April 2013	4	8 → 4	8: 1st–8th
Semifinals	19 April 2013	2	4 → 2	
Final	3 May 2013	1	2 → 1	

== Bracket ==
Quarterfinals; 12 April 2013
1	Defence Force	6
8	T&TEC	1
4	North East Stars	1
5	Central FC	0
3	W Connection	4
6	Police	0
2	Caledonia AIA	4
7	St. Ann's Rangers	1

Semifinals; 19 April 2013
1	Defence Force	1 (4)
4	North East Stars	1 (5)
3	W Connection	2
2	Caledonia AIA	1

Final; 3 May 2013
4	North East Stars	0 (3)
3	W Connection	0 (4)

== Results ==
All matches were played for 90 minutes duration, at the end of which if the match was still tied, penalty-kicks were used to determine the match winner.

=== Quarterfinals ===
In the quarterfinals, all top-seeded teams advanced to the semifinals with relative ease. Defence Force used a brace each from Devorn Jorsling and Kevon Carter to defeat T&TEC 6–1. The Stallions from Morvant/Laventille upended St. Ann's Rangers 4–1 and W Connection secured a 4–0 clean sheet against Police. The lone match decided by fewer than three goals was between North East Stars and Central FC. Using a goal in the twenty-ninth minute from Elijah Manners, the Sangre Grande Boys recorded a 1–0 win.

12 April 2013	Defence Force	6–1	T&TEC	Couva, Trinidad
18:00 (UTC-4)	Jorsling 20', 36'; Carter 65', 67'; Roy 80'; Belgrave 90+'	Report	Elcock 45' (o.g.)	Stadium: Ato Boldon Stadium

12 April 2013	Caledonia AIA	4–1	St. Ann's Rangers	Macoya, Trinidad
18:00 (UTC-4)	David 39'; Gay 47'; Lester 86'; Lewis 89'	Report	Charles 90+'	Stadium: Marvin Lee Stadium

12 April 2013	W Connection	4–0	Police	Couva, Trinidad
20:00 (UTC-4)	Arcia 31'; Britto 46'; Rijssel 56'; Jones 68'	Report		Stadium: Ato Boldon Stadium

12 April 2013	North East Stars	1–0	Central FC	Macoya, Trinidad
20:00 (UTC-4)	Manners 29'	Report		Stadium: Marvin Lee Stadium

=== Semifinals ===
On 19 April, North East Stars and W Connection claimed victories in their semifinal matches to advance to the final on 3 May at Marvin Lee Stadium in Macoya. In the early semifinal, North East Stars defeated Defence Force 5–4 on penalties after the match ended 1–1 following goals from Kerry Baptiste for North East Stars in the 35th minute and Kevon Carter of Defence Force on the other side of half-time. In the penalty shootout, Cleon John saved two penalties from Josimar Belgrave and Jemel Sebro to give North East Stars the win. In the other semifinal, Joevin Jones recorded a brace in a 2–1 upset of defending champions Caledonia AIA.

19 April 2013	Defence Force	1–1 (4–5 p)	North East Stars	Macoya, Trinidad
18:00 (UTC-4)	Carter 51'	Report	Baptiste 35'	Stadium: Marvin Lee Stadium
	Penalties
	Roy (penalty scored); Gonzales (penalty scored); Elcock (penalty scored); Belgrave (penalty missed); Rivers (penalty scored); Sebro (penalty missed)		Manners (penalty scored); Moses (penalty scored); Simpson (penalty missed); Thomas (penalty scored); Hinkson (penalty scored); Villaroel (penalty scored)

19 April 2013	Caledonia AIA	1–2	W Connection	Macoya, Trinidad
20:00 (UTC-4)	Armstrong 55'	Report	Jones 39', 90+'	Stadium: Marvin Lee Stadium

=== Final ===
In the final on 3 May, W Connection and North East Stars played to a 0–0 draw in regulation time and the match went immediately into a penalty shootout. Goalkeeper Alejandro Figueroa saved two penalties from North East Stars' Elijah Manners and Keithy Simpson to give the Savonetta Boys a 4–3 win from the penalty spot. The win resulted in W Connection claiming its second Lucozade Sport Goal Shield title and first since the inaugural tournament in 2009. W Connection's Joevin Jones and Defence Force's Kevon Carter finished the tournament as the leading scorers each scoring three goals for their respective clubs.

3 May 2013	W Connection	0–0 (4–3 p)	North East Stars	Macoya, Trinidad
20:00 (UTC-4)		Report		Stadium: Marvin Lee Stadium; Referee: Rodphin Harris
	Penalties
	Jones (penalty scored); Spann (penalty missed); Paul (penalty scored); Williams (penalty scored); Leon (penalty scored)		Manners (penalty missed); John (penalty scored); Moses (penalty scored); Simpson (penalty missed); Hinkson (penalty scored)
