= 2014 Trinidad and Tobago Goal Shield =

2014 Lucozade Sport Goal Shield
Trinidad and Tobago Goal Shield

Tournament details
- Country: Trinidad and Tobago
- Teams: 9

Final positions
- Champions: Central FC
- Runners-up: W Connection

Tournament statistics
- Matches played: 8
- Goals scored: 21 (2.63 per match)
- Top goal scorer(s): Hashim Arcia; Keron Cummings; Marvin Oliver; Willis Plaza; Rundell Winchester (2 goals each)

Awards
- Best player: Rundell Winchester

The 2014 Trinidad and Tobago Goal Shield was the fifth season of the Lucozade Sport Goal Shield, which is a knockout tournament competition for Trinidad and Tobago teams competing in the TT Pro League. W Connection entered as the cup holders having defeated North East Stars 4–3 in a penalty shootout in the 2013 final. Continuing from previous seasons, the competition not only allowed the winner and runner-up healthy purses at the end of the tournament, but more so give an added incentive for more goals to be scored throughout the tournament. In particular, the winner of the competition was awarded TT$30,000 plus an additional TT$3,000 for every goal scored in the final, TT$2,000 for every goal in the semifinals, and TT$1,000 for each goal scored in the quarterfinals. Whereas, the runner-up was awarded TT$10,000 plus TT$1,500 for every goal scored in the final, TT$1,000 for every goal in the semifinals, and TT$500 for each goal scored in the quarterfinals.

== Qualification ==
Since the league expanded to nine clubs for the 2013–14 TT Pro League season, the competition re-introduced the qualifying round to narrow the number of teams prior to the quarterfinals. Seeding was determined from the league standings at the end of fixtures held on 29 March 2014. W Connection entered the competition as the league leader and top seeded team in the competition. The remaining top seeds were Central FC, North East Stars, and Point Fortin Civic after placing second, third, and fourth, respectively, in the league table at the time of the draw.

The draw for the quarterfinals took place on 31 March 2014 at the Capital Plaza in Port of Spain. The quarterfinal matches to be played on 4 April in Ato Boldon Stadium resulted in Central FC facing Caledonia AIA and Point Fortin Civic against Defence Force. The following night in Couva, W Connection will face the winner of the qualifying round between the bottom two in the league table, San Juan Jabloteh and St. Ann's Rangers, and North East Stars against Police.

== Schedule ==
The schedule for the 2014 Lucozade Sport Goal Shield, as announced by the TT Pro League:

Round	Date	Matches	Clubs	New entries this round
Qualifying round	3 April 2014	1	9 → 8	2: 8th–9th
Quarterfinals	4 April 2014	4	8 → 4	7: 1st–7th
Semifinals	11 April 2014	2	4 → 2	
Final	25 April 2014	1	2 → 1	

== Bracket ==
Qualifying round 3 April 2014
8	San Juan Jabloteh	2
9	St. Ann's Rangers	0

Quarterfinals; 4 April 2014
1	W Connection	3
8	San Juan Jabloteh	1
4	Point Fortin Civic	1 (4)
5	Defence Force	1 (3)
3	North East Stars	2
6	Police	1
2	Central FC	4
7	Caledonia AIA	0

Semifinals; 11 April 2014
1	W Connection	1
4	Point Fortin Civic	0
3	North East Stars	0
2	Central FC	2

Final; 25 April 2014
1	W Connection	1
2	Central FC	2

== Results ==
All matches were played for 90 minutes duration, at the end of which if the match was still tied, penalty-kicks were used to determine the match winner.

=== Qualifying round ===
The competition kicked off with the qualifying round between the San Juan Jabloteh and St. Ann's Rangers, which represented the bottom of the 2013–14 TT Pro League league table. The San Juan Kings used goals on either side of the half from Jean-Luc Rochford and Micah Lewis, respectively, to advance to the quarterfinals to face W Connection.

2 April 2014	San Juan Jabloteh	2–0	St. Ann's Rangers	Malabar, Trinidad
18:00 (UTC-4)	Rochford 5'; Lewis 61'	Report		Stadium: Larry Gomes Stadium

=== Quarterfinals ===
In the quarterfinals, all four of the higher seeds progressed. In the early match in Couva on 4 April, Central FC easily defeated the Stallions of Morvant/Laventille with a 4–0 win, which included a first-half brace from Willis Plaza. However, the Akini Adams stole the spotlight in the late match between Point Fortin Civic and Defence Force. Acting as a stand-in goalkeeper, Adams saved two kicks in the penalty shootout, after the match ended 1–1, to help Point Fortin advance to the semifinals. After the match, Adams dedicated the win to his brother Akeem Adams, who died on 30 December 2013 from a heart attack suffered in September while playing for Ferencváros in Hungary. The following day, W Connection won convincingly over San Juan Jabloteh after scoring three goals in the first half. North East Stars used a brace from Keron Cummings to upend Police and advance to the semifinals.

4 April 2014	Central FC	4–0	Caledonia AIA	Couva, Trinidad
18:00 (UTC-4)	Plaza 14' (pen.), 43'; Guerra 81'; Oliver 90' (pen.)	Report		Stadium: Ato Boldon Stadium; Referee: Mervyn Wallace

4 April 2014	Point Fortin Civic	1–1 (4–3 p)	Defence Force	Couva, Trinidad
20:00 (UTC-4)		Report		Stadium: Ato Boldon Stadium; Referee: Cecil Hinds
	Penalties
	M. Joseph (penalty scored); Toussaint (penalty scored); Ettienne (penalty scored); Bass (penalty scored)		Jorsling (penalty scored); Roy (penalty scored); Gonzales (penalty missed); Russell Jr. (penalty scored); Rivers (penalty missed)

5 April 2014	W Connection	3–1	San Juan Jabloteh	Couva, Trinidad
18:00 (UTC-4)	Paul 8'; Clarence 15'; Arcia 24'	Report	Smith 75'	Stadium: Ato Boldon Stadium; Referee: Gyasi McDonald

5 April 2014	North East Stars	2–1	Police	Couva, Trinidad
20:00 (UTC-4)	Cummings 2', 41'	Report	Perry 72'	Stadium: Ato Boldon Stadium; Referee: Neal Brizan

=== Semifinals ===
On 11 April, W Connection and Central FC won their semifinal contests to advance to the final on 25 April at Ato Boldon Stadium in Couva. In the first semifinal, Central FC defeated North East Stars 2–0 following goals from their two young strikers; Dwight Quintero and Rundell Winchester on either side of half-time. W Connection used a lone goal from Hashim Arcia in the 53rd minute to defeat Point Fortin Civic 1–0.

11 April 2014	Central FC	2–0	North East Stars	Couva, Trinidad
18:00 (UTC-4)	Quintero 15'; Winchester 79'	Report		Stadium: Ato Boldon Stadium; Referee: Gyasi McDonald

11 April 2014	W Connection	1–0	Point Fortin Civic	Couva, Trinidad
20:00 (UTC-4)	Arcia 53'	Report		Stadium: Ato Boldon Stadium; Referee: Rodphin Harris

=== Final ===
In the final on 25 April, Central FC scored two goals in succession from Rundell Winchester and Marvin Oliver to power the Couva Sharks to their first Goal Shield title. For his performance in the final, Winchester was named the Most Valuable Player after providing his second goal of the tournament and setting up the winning goal from Oliver.

25 April 2014	W Connection	1–2	Central FC	Couva, Trinidad
20:00 (UTC-4)	A. Jones 21'	Report	Winchester 13'; Oliver 19'	Stadium: Ato Boldon Stadium; Referee: Neal Brizan
