= List of Trinidadian football transfers 2012–13 =

Trinidadian football transfers

This is a list of Trinidadian football transfers during the 2012–13 season. Only moves featuring at least one TT Pro League club are listed. Transfers that were made following the conclusion of the 2011–12 season on 29 March 2012, but many transfers will only officially go through on 1 July, during the 2012–13 season, and following the season until 30 June 2013, are listed.

Players without a club cannot join one at any time, either during or in between transfer windows. Clubs within or outside the Pro League may sign players on loan at any time. If need be, clubs may sign a goalkeeper on an emergency loan, if all others are unavailable.

== Transfers ==
All players and clubs without with a flag are from Trinidad and Tobago. In addition, transfers involving Major League Soccer clubs in the United States and Canada technically have the league as the second party and not the listed club. MLS player contracts are owned by the league and not by individual clubs.

Date	Player	Moving from	Moving to	Fee
1 July 2012	Andre Toussaint	T&TEC	Joe Public	Free
1 July 2012	(Dominican Republic) Miguel Lloyd	W Connection	(Panama) Árabe Unido	Free
6 July 2012	Willis Plaza	San Juan Jabloteh	(Vietnam) Sông Lam Nghệ An	Free
7 July 2012	Jayson Joseph	T&TEC	North East Stars	Free
18 July 2012	Silvio Spann	Unattached	W Connection	Free
18 July 2012	(Guyana) Aubrey David	T&TEC	Caledonia AIA	Free
19 July 2012	(Suriname) Stefano Rijssel	(Suriname) Inter Moengotapoe	W Connection	Undisclosed
21 July 2012	Adrian Foncette	Unattached	North East Stars	Free
22 July 2012	Cornell Glen	Unattached	North East Stars	Free
25 July 2012	Devorn Jorsling	Caledonia AIA	Defence Force	Free
20 August 2012	Kerlon Ferguson	T&TEC	Caledonia AIA	Free
22 August 2012	Mekeil Williams	W Connection	(Denmark) Fyn	Free
23 August 2012	Johan Peltier	Unattached	North East Stars	Free
25 August 2012	(South Sudan) Ladulé Lako LoSarah	(United States) San Diego Flash	St. Ann's Rangers	Free
25 August 2012	(United States) Daniel Torres	Unattached	St. Ann's Rangers	Free
27 August 2012	Jason Marcano	Unattached	St. Ann's Rangers	Free
27 August 2012	Jamal Jack	Unattached	St. Ann's Rangers	Free
27 August 2012	Christon Thomas	Unattached	St. Ann's Rangers	Free
27 August 2012	Andrew Smith	Unattached	St. Ann's Rangers	Free
27 August 2012	Zane Coker	Caledonia AIA	St. Ann's Rangers	Free
27 August 2012	Kurdell Brathwaite	Police	St. Ann's Rangers	Free
27 August 2012	Raymond St. Hllaire	Westside Super Starz	St. Ann's Rangers	Free
27 August 2012	(Guyana) Akel Clarke	Real Maracas	St. Ann's Rangers	Free
27 August 2012	Kadeem Darlington	Unattached	St. Ann's Rangers	Free
27 August 2012	Tarik Nicholls	Unattached	St. Ann's Rangers	Free
27 August 2012	Justin Harper	Unattached	St. Ann's Rangers	Free
6 September 2012	Hayden Tinto	Joe Public	Central FC	Free
6 September 2012	Quincy Charles	Joe Public	Central FC	Free
6 September 2012	Tyrone Charles	Joe Public	Central FC	Free
6 September 2012	Sayid Freitas	Police	Central FC	Free
6 September 2012	Adrian Noel	Police	Central FC	Free
6 September 2012	Simba Aberdeen	1.FC Santa Rosa	Central FC	Free
6 September 2012	Cyrano Glen	Unattached	Central FC	Free
6 September 2012	Jameel Neptune	Unattached	Central FC	Free
6 September 2012	Marvin Oliver	Unattached	Central FC	Free
6 September 2012	Dylon Charles	Unattached	Central FC	Free
6 September 2012	(Guyana) Kelvin Smith	Unattached	Central FC	Free
6 September 2012	Darryl Trim	Unattached	Central FC	Free
6 September 2012	(Jamaica) Shane Mattis	St. Ann's Rangers	Central FC	Free
6 September 2012	Shaquille Nesbitte	St. Ann's Rangers	Central FC	Free
6 September 2012	Keron Cummings	W Connection	Central FC	Free
6 September 2012	Marvin Phillip	T&TEC	Central FC	Free
6 September 2012	Akeem Adams	T&TEC	Central FC	Free
6 September 2012	Corneal Thomas	T&TEC	Central FC	Free
6 September 2012	Anthony Wolfe	North East Stars	Central FC	Free
6 September 2012	Kevaughn Connell	North East Stars	Central FC	Free
6 September 2012	Keion Goodridge	North East Stars	Central FC	Free
6 September 2012	Marc Leslie	Unattached	Central FC	Free
6 September 2012	(Guyana) Carey Harris	Unattached	Central FC	Free
6 September 2012	Trent Noel	Joe Public	Police	Free
7 September 2012	Jameel Perry	North East Stars	Police	Free
7 September 2012	Karlon Murray	Unattached	Police	Free
7 September 2012	Anton Hutchinson	Unattached	Police	Free
7 September 2012	Kareem Perry	Unattached	Police	Free
7 September 2012	Joshua Bachan	Unattached	Police	Free
7 September 2012	Ashim Pierre	Unattached	Police	Free
7 September 2012	Keith Weekes	Unattached	Police	Free
7 September 2012	Kwasi Tommy	Unattached	Police	Free
7 September 2012	Dillon Lewis	Unattached	Police	Free
13 September 2012	Sheldon Bateau	North East Stars	(Belgium) KV Mechelen	Undisclosed
14 September 2012	Kevon Villaroel	Westside Super Starz	North East Stars	Free
20 September 2012	(South Sudan) Ladulé Lako LoSarah	St. Ann's Rangers	Central FC	Free
20 September 2012	(United States) Daniel Torres	St. Ann's Rangers	Central FC	Free
17 December 2012	Radanfah Abu Bakr	Unattached	Caledonia AIA	Free
20 December 2012	Osei Telesford	Puerto Rico Islanders	Central FC	Loan
20 December 2012	Justin Fojo	Puerto Rico Islanders	Central FC	Free
20 December 2012	Rennie Britto	W Connection	Central FC	Loan
20 December 2012	Rundell Winchester	Stokely Vale	Central FC	Free
20 December 2012	Omar Charles	Stokely Vale	Central FC	Free
22 December 2012	Dwane James	Caledonia AIA	St. Ann's Rangers	Free
30 December 2012	Darren Mitchell	1976 FC Phoenix	Central FC	Free
30 December 2012	Dario Holmes	1976 FC Phoenix	Central FC	Free
3 January 2013	Larry Bacchus	Unattached	T&TEC	Free
3 January 2013	Husani Thomas	Unattached	T&TEC	Free
4 January 2013	Elijah Belgrave	St. Ann's Rangers	Police	Free
4 January 2013	Jevon Morris	St. Ann's Rangers	Police	Free
4 January 2013	Christon Thomas	St. Ann's Rangers	Police	Free
4 January 2013	Kerry Fredericks	Caledonia AIA	Police	Free
4 January 2013	Kemron Purcell	Caledonia AIA	Police	Free
4 January 2013	Anthony Marshall	Club Sando	Police	Free
4 January 2013	Noel Williams	Club Sando	Police	Free
5 January 2013	(Antigua and Barbuda) Akeem Thomas	(Antigua and Barbuda) Antigua Barracuda FC	Caledonia AIA	Free
5 January 2013	(Antigua and Barbuda) Elvis Thomas	(Antigua and Barbuda) Antigua Barracuda FC	Caledonia AIA	Free
5 January 2013	Hector Sam	St. Ann's Rangers	Central FC	Free
5 January 2013	Wesley John	Police	Central FC	Free
7 January 2013	Sherron Joseph	Unattached	Caledonia AIA	Free
7 January 2013	(Grenada) Shemel Louison	(Grenada) Queens Park Rangers	Caledonia AIA	Free
7 January 2013	(Jamaica) Keithy Simpson	(Jamaica) Tivoli Gardens	North East Stars	Loan
9 January 2013	(Antigua and Barbuda) Peter Byers	(Antigua and Barbuda) Antigua Barracuda FC	Central FC	Free
9 January 2013	(Antigua and Barbuda) Troy Dublin	(Antigua and Barbuda) Antigua Barracuda FC	Central FC	Free
11 January 2013	(Guyana) Vurlon Mills	1.FC Santa Rosa	Caledonia AIA	Undisclosed
14 January 2013	Kerron Reid	Joe Public	St. Ann's Rangers	Free
14 January 2013	Devon King	Joe Public	St. Ann's Rangers	Free
14 January 2013	Dominique Hutchinson	Joe Public	St. Ann's Rangers	Free
14 January 2013	Alfie James	Joe Public	St. Ann's Rangers	Free
14 January 2013	Muhammad Nakid	Joe Public	St. Ann's Rangers	Free
14 January 2013	Musa Nakid	Joe Public	St. Ann's Rangers	Free
15 January 2013	Jason Marcano	St. Ann's Rangers	Central FC	Free
15 January 2013	Johan Peltier	North East Stars	Central FC	Undisclosed
15 January 2013	(Saint Vincent and the Grenadines) Shemol Trimmingham	(Saint Vincent and the Grenadines) Systems 3	Caledonia AIA	Free
15 January 2013	(Saint Vincent and the Grenadines) Nical Stephens	(Saint Vincent and the Grenadines) Pastures United FC	Caledonia AIA	Free
15 January 2013	(Canada) Miguel Alejandro Romeo	Unattached	Caledonia AIA	Free
15 January 2013	(Brazil) Douglas Poroca	Unattached	Caledonia AIA	Free
15 January 2013	Qian Grosvenor	Westside Super Starz	Caledonia AIA	Free
15 January 2013	Fabien Lewis	(Singapore) Woodlands Wellington FC	Central FC	Free
15 January 2013	Shem Alexander	Unattached	St. Ann's Rangers	Free
15 January 2013	Marvin Lee	Unattached	St. Ann's Rangers	Free
15 January 2013	Ryan O'Neil	Defence Force	St. Ann's Rangers	Free
15 January 2013	(Colombia) Alejandro Figueroa	Unattached	W Connection	Free
15 January 2013	(Saint Lucia) Tremain Paul	(Saint Lucia) Pakis FC	W Connection	Free
15 January 2013	Joel John Bailey	Unattached	T&TEC	Free
15 January 2013	Stephan Chang	1.FC Santa Rosa	North East Stars	Free
25 January 2013	Shahdon Winchester	W Connection	(Finland) FF Jaro	Loan
28 January 2013	(Guyana) Walter Moore	Caledonia AIA	(Kazakhstan) FC Vostok	Free
1 February 2013	(South Sudan) Ladule Lako LoSarah	Central FC	(Maldives) Maziya S&RC	Free
4 February 2013	Radanfah Abu Bakr	Caledonia AIA	(Kazakhstan) FC Vostok	Free
12 February 2013	Seon Power	North East Stars	(Thailand) Chainat FC	Undisclosed
22 February 2013	(Guyana) Trayon Bobb	Caledonia AIA	(Finland) TP-47	Undisclosed
1 March 2013	(Saint Vincent and the Grenadines) Cornelius Stewart	Caledonia AIA	(Finland) OPS	Free
12 March 2013	Jan-Michael Williams	W Connection	St. Ann's Rangers	Free
15 March 2013	Ataullah Guerra	Caledonia AIA	(Finland) RoPS	Loan
26 March 2013	Fabien Lewis	Central FC	(Philippines) Kaya	Free
5 May 2013	Mekeil Williams	Unattached	W Connection	Free
19 May 2013	Andre Toussaint	Joe Public	Caledonia AIA	Free
27 May 2013	Shaquille Bertrand	North East Stars	1.FC Santa Rosa	Loan
27 May 2013	Gerard de Verteuil	North East Stars	1.FC Santa Rosa	Loan
27 May 2013	Urbane Joseph	North East Stars	1.FC Santa Rosa	Loan
27 May 2013	Keston Superville	North East Stars	1.FC Santa Rosa	Loan
17 June 2013	Cornell Glen	North East Stars	(India) Shillong Lajong	Free
