= 2012 Trinidad and Tobago Goal Shield =

2012 Lucozade Sport Goal Shield
Trinidad and Tobago Goal Shield

Tournament details
- Country: Trinidad and Tobago
- Teams: 8

Final positions
- Champions: Caledonia AIA
- Runners-up: Defence Force

Tournament statistics
- Matches played: 7
- Goals scored: 22 (3.14 per match)
- Top goal scorer: Richard Roy (4 goals)

Awards
- Best player: Stephan David

The 2012 Trinidad and Tobago Goal Shield was the third season of the Lucozade Sport Goal Shield, which is a knockout tournament competition for Trinidad and Tobago teams competing in the TT Pro League. North East Stars entered as the Goal Shield holders after defeating San Juan Jabloteh 1–0 in the 2010 final. Continuing from previous seasons, the competition not only allowed the winner and runner-up healthy purses at the end of the tournament, but more so give an added incentive for more goals to be scored throughout the tournament. In particular, the winner of the competition was awarded TT$20,000 plus an additional TT$3,000 for every goal scored in the final, TT$2,000 for every goal in the semifinals, and TT$1,000 for each goal scored in the quarterfinals. Whereas, the runner-up was awarded TT$10,000 plus TT$1,500 for every goal scored in the final, TT$1,000 for every goal in the semifinals, and TT$500 for each goal scored in the quarterfinals.

Along with the shift in the league calendar of the TT Pro League from April through December to September through March, the Pro League also shifted the TOYOTA Classic to be played in November of each year. Moreover, the Pro League moved the Lucozade Sport Goal Shield towards the conclusion of the league season in April and May. As a result, the Goal Shield was not competed during the 2011 calendar year.

== Qualification ==
For the second consecutive season, all eight teams competing in the TT Pro League entered the competition at the quarterfinal round. Seeding was determined from the league standings after the conclusion of the second round of fixtures during the 2012–13 season. Defence Force entered the competition as the league leader and top seeded team in the competition. The remaining top seeds were Caledonia AIA, W Connection, and North East Stars after finishing in second, third, and fourth place, respectively, in the league table at the time of the draw.

The draw for the quarterfinals took place on 10 April 2013 at the VIP Lounge of the Hasely Crawford Stadium, in Mucurapo. The quarterfinal match-ups resulted in Defence Force facing bottom of the league table T&TEC at Ato Boldon Stadium in Couva. The later match at Ato Boldon Stadium featured W Connection against Police. In the other two quarterfinal matches hosted at Marvin Lee Stadium in Macoya, Caledonia AIA faced St. Ann's Rangers and North East Stars against Central FC.

== Schedule ==
The schedule for the 2012 Lucozade Sport Goal Shield, as announced by the TT Pro League:

Round	Date	Matches	Clubs	New entries this round
Quarterfinals	13 April 2012	4	8 → 4	8: 1st–8th
Semifinals	20 April 2012	2	4 → 2	
Final	27 April 2012	1	2 → 1	

== Bracket ==
Quarterfinals; 13 April 2012
1	W Connection	0
8	St. Ann's Rangers	1
4	Defence Force	4
5	San Juan Jabloteh	1
3	Caledonia AIA	1
6	Police	0
2	T&TEC	1 (4)
7	North East Stars	1 (3)

Semifinals; 20 April 2012
8	St. Ann's Rangers	1
4	Defence Force	4
3	Caledonia AIA	3
2	T&TEC	1

Final; 27 April 2012
4	Defence Force	1
3	Caledonia AIA	3

== Results ==
All matches were played for 90 minutes duration, at the end of which if the match was still tied, penalty-kicks were used to determine the match winner.

=== Quarterfinals ===
13 April 2012	W Connection	0–1	St. Ann's Rangers	Marabella, Trinidad
18:00 (UTC-4)		Report	Modeste 5'	Stadium: Manny Ramjohn Stadium

13 April 2012	Caledonia AIA	1–0	Police	Mucurapo, Trinidad
18:00 (UTC-4)	Gay 66'	Report		Stadium: Hasely Crawford Stadium

13 April 2012	T&TEC	1–1 (4–3 p)	North East Stars	Marabella, Trinidad
20:00 (UTC-4)	Power 67'	Report	De Leon 5'	Stadium: Manny Ramjohn Stadium

13 April 2012	Defence Force	4–1	San Juan Jabloteh	Mucurapo, Trinidad
20:00 (UTC-4)	Baptiste 50'; Serries 57'; Roy 70'; Belgrave 77'	Report	Jamerson 27'	Stadium: Hasely Crawford Stadium

=== Semifinals ===
20 April 2012	Defence Force	4–1	St. Ann's Rangers	Marabella, Trinidad
18:00 (UTC-4)	Roy 57', 84'; Belgrave 64'; Balthazar 81'	Report	Roget 59'	Stadium: Manny Ramjohn Stadium

20 April 2012	T&TEC	1–3	Caledonia AIA	Marabella, Trinidad
20:00 (UTC-4)	Neaves 63'	Report	Thomas 13'; Jorsling 47'; Guerra 70'	Stadium: Manny Ramjohn Stadium

=== Final ===
27 April 2012	Caledonia AIA	3–1	Defence Force	Mucurapo, Trinidad
20:00 (UTC-4)	Joseph 6'; Gay 48'; Moore 50'	Report	Roy 40'	Stadium: Hasely Crawford Stadium
