= List of Trinidadian football transfers 2013–14 =

Trinidadian football transfers

This is a list of Trinidadian football transfers during the 2013–14 season. Only moves featuring at least one TT Pro League club are listed. Transfers that were made following the conclusion of the 2012–13 season on 10 May 2013, but many transfers will only officially go through on 1 July, during the 2013–14 season, and following the season until 30 June 2014, are listed.

Players without a club cannot join one at any time, either during or in between transfer windows. Clubs within or outside the Pro League may sign players on loan at any time. If need be, clubs may sign a goalkeeper on an emergency loan, if all others are unavailable.

== Transfers ==
All players and clubs without with a flag are from Trinidad and Tobago. In addition, transfers involving Major League Soccer clubs in the United States and Canada technically have the league as the second party and not the listed club. MLS player contracts are owned by the league and not by individual clubs.

Date	Player	Moving from	Moving to	Fee
1 July 2013	Hayden Tinto	Central FC	Malabar	Free
1 July 2013	Cyrano Glen	Central FC	Malabar	Free
1 July 2013	Jameel Neptune	Central FC	Malabar	Free
1 July 2013	Devon Modeste	St. Ann's Rangers	Club Sando	Free
1 July 2013	Kern Cupid	W Connection	Club Sando	Free
1 July 2013	Andre Marchan	W Connection	Club Sando	Free
1 July 2013	Kemuel Rivers	W Connection	Club Sando	Free
1 July 2013	Corneal Thomas	Central FC	Club Sando	Free
1 July 2013	Odelle Armstrong	Caledonia AIA	Club Sando	Free
1 July 2013	Trevin Caesar	Caledonia AIA	North East Stars	Free
1 July 2013	Conrad Smith	Caledonia AIA	St. Ann's Rangers	Free
2 July 2013	Jamal Jack	St. Ann's Rangers	Central FC	Free
2 July 2013	Shem Alexander	St. Ann's Rangers	Central FC	Free
2 July 2013	Julio Noel	St. Ann's Rangers	Central FC	Free
2 July 2013	Kevon Goddard	St. Ann's Rangers	Central FC	Free
2 July 2013	Dwight Pope	Shiva Boys' Hindu College	Central FC	Free
2 July 2013	Javon Sample	St. Anthony's College	Central FC	Free
13 July 2013	(Dominica) Julian Wade	(Dominica) Bath Estate	Caledonia AIA	Undisclosed
15 July 2013	(Italy) Mirko Delia	Unattached	W Connection	Free
15 July 2013	(Brazil) João Ananias	(Brazil) Náutico	W Connection	Loan
20 July 2013	Dwight Quintero	El Dorado East Secondary	Central FC	Free
23 July 2013	Noel Williams	Police	Caledonia AIA	Loan
25 July 2013	(Guyana) Jamaal Smith	Unattached	Caledonia AIA	Free
5 August 2013	(Brazil) Célio da Silva	(Brazil) Anápolis	W Connection	Undisclosed
5 August 2013	(Colombia) Yhon Reyes	(Colombia) Club Deportivo Orsomarso	W Connection	Undisclosed
5 August 2013	(Colombia) Yefer Lozano	(Colombia) Club Deportivo Orsomarso	W Connection	Undisclosed
5 August 2013	(Colombia) Camilo Ortega	(Colombia) Club Deportivo Orsomarso	W Connection	Undisclosed
5 August 2013	(Saint Kitts and Nevis) Julani Archibald	(Saint Kitts and Nevis) Village Superstars FC	W Connection	Undisclosed
5 August 2013	(Saint Kitts and Nevis) Devaughn Elliott	(Saint Kitts and Nevis) Village Superstars FC	W Connection	Undisclosed
6 August 2013	Jan-Michael Williams	St. Ann's Rangers	Central FC	Free
14 August 2013	(Brazil) Douglas Poroca	Caledonia AIA	St. Ann's Rangers	Free
14 August 2013	(Brazil) Euler Gomes dos Santos	Unattached	St. Ann's Rangers	Free
21 August 2013	Jean-Luc Rochford	Caledonia AIA	North East Stars	Free
22 August 2013	Elton John	North East Stars	Central FC	Undisclosed
22 August 2013	Akeem Benjamin	Unattached	Central FC	Free
22 August 2013	Keon Trim	Unattached	Central FC	Free
22 August 2013	(Jamaica) Toric Robinson	(Antigua and Barbuda) Antigua Barracuda FC	Central FC	Free
10 September 2013	Kelvin Modeste	Unattached	Point Fortin Civic	Free
12 September 2013	Andre Toussaint	Caledonia AIA	Point Fortin Civic	Free
12 September 2013	Andrei Pacheco	W Connection	Point Fortin Civic	Loan
12 September 2013	Nickolson Thomas	W Connection	Point Fortin Civic	Free
13 September 2013	Andre Ettienne	Unattached	Point Fortin Civic	Free
13 September 2013	Akini Adams	Unattached	Point Fortin Civic	Free
13 September 2013	Wesley John	Unattached	Point Fortin Civic	Free
13 September 2013	Sylvester Teesdale	Unattached	Point Fortin Civic	Free
13 September 2013	Marvin Phillip	Unattached	Point Fortin Civic	Free
13 September 2013	Glen Sutton	Unattached	Point Fortin Civic	Free
13 September 2013	Lyndon Diaz	Unattached	Point Fortin Civic	Free
13 September 2013	Bevon Bass	Unattached	Point Fortin Civic	Free
13 September 2013	Keron Neptune	Unattached	Point Fortin Civic	Free
13 September 2013	Brenton De Leon	Unattached	Point Fortin Civic	Free
13 September 2013	Kelvin Hernandez	Unattached	Point Fortin Civic	Free
13 September 2013	Akeem Parris	Unattached	Point Fortin Civic	Free
13 September 2013	Kevin Rouse	Unattached	Point Fortin Civic	Free
13 September 2013	Akiniyei Rouse	Unattached	Point Fortin Civic	Free
14 September 2013	Aquil Selby	Caledonia AIA	North East Stars	Free
14 September 2013	(Puerto Rico) Andrés Cabrero	(Puerto Rico) Criollos de Caguas	North East Stars	Undisclosed
15 September 2013	Qian Grosvenor	Westwide Super Starz	St. Ann's Rangers	Free
15 September 2013	Kern Caesar	Westwide Super Starz	St. Ann's Rangers	Free
15 September 2013	Keron Cummings	Westwide Super Starz	St. Ann's Rangers	Free
15 September 2013	Stefan Berkeley	Westwide Super Starz	North East Stars	Free
16 September 2013	Kerry Baptiste	North East Stars	San Juan Jabloteh	Undisclosed
16 September 2013	(Grenada) Kithson Bain	Unattached	Caledonia AIA	Free
16 September 2013	Kevaughn Connell	Unattached	Caledonia AIA	Free
16 September 2013	Juma Clarence	Unattached	W Connection	Free
16 September 2013	Kevin Dobbs	Malabar	San Juan Jabloteh	Free
16 September 2013	Keston Malchan	Harlem Strikers	San Juan Jabloteh	Free
16 September 2013	Jesse Peters	St. Ann's Rangers	San Juan Jabloteh	Free
16 September 2013	Jevon Morris	Police	San Juan Jabloteh	Free
16 September 2013	Dario Holmes	Unattached	San Juan Jabloteh	Free
16 September 2013	Dillon Kirton	WASA	San Juan Jabloteh	Free
16 September 2013	Keino Goodridge	Joe Public	San Juan Jabloteh	Free
16 September 2013	Nyron Jones	Carib	San Juan Jabloteh	Free
16 September 2013	Kevin Figaro	Unattached	San Juan Jabloteh	Free
16 September 2013	Alfie James	St. Ann's Rangers	San Juan Jabloteh	Free
16 September 2013	Shane Hospidales	Malabar	San Juan Jabloteh	Free
16 September 2013	Trevon Lester	Cantaro United	San Juan Jabloteh	Free
16 September 2013	Le Kion Ellie	Westside Super Starz	San Juan Jabloteh	Free
16 September 2013	Rennie Britto	Unattached	San Juan Jabloteh	Free
16 September 2013	Jamal Spencer	Cunupia	San Juan Jabloteh	Free
16 September 2013	Akil Thomas	WASA	San Juan Jabloteh	Free
16 September 2013	Savion Kirton	Barataria Ball Players	San Juan Jabloteh	Free
16 September 2013	Jelani Felix	Unattached	San Juan Jabloteh	Free
16 September 2013	Kerry Mitchell	Unattached	San Juan Jabloteh	Free
16 September 2013	Kerry Daniel	Cantaro United	San Juan Jabloteh	Free
16 September 2013	Kevin Piper	Westside Super Starz	San Juan Jabloteh	Free
16 September 2013	Lemuel Lyons	Club Sando	San Juan Jabloteh	Free
16 September 2013	Shaquille Bertrand	Unattached	San Juan Jabloteh	Free
16 September 2013	Anthony Guppy	Cantaro United	San Juan Jabloteh	Free
16 September 2013	Darryl Mark	Defence Force	San Juan Jabloteh	Free
17 October 2013	Gem Gordon	1976 FC Phoenix	W Connection	Free
18 October 2013	Akil DeFreitas	(Lithuania) FK Dainava	Central FC	Free
15 December 2013	Anthony Wolfe	North East Stars	(India) Churchill Brothers	Undisclosed
1 January 2014	Ataullah Guerra	Unattached	Central FC	Free
3 January 2014	Kendall Davis	W Connection	Point Fortin Civic	Free
3 January 2014	Jamille Boatswain	Unattached	Point Fortin Civic	Free
3 January 2014	Kestwin Goolie	Unattached	Point Fortin Civic	Free
3 January 2014	Dwane James	St. Ann's Rangers	San Juan Jabloteh	Free
4 January 2014	Lemuel Lyons	San Juan Jabloteh	North East Stars	Free
4 January 2014	Chike Sullivan	San Juan Jabloteh	North East Stars	Free
4 January 2014	Anslem Jackson	Unattached	North East Stars	Free
4 January 2014	Keron Cummings	St. Ann's Rangers	North East Stars	Free
9 January 2014	Clevon McFee	St. Ann's Rangers	Police	Free
9 January 2014	Kurdell Braithwaite	St. Ann's Rangers	Police	Free
9 January 2014	Yohance Marshall	(Myanmar) Nay Pyi Taw	Central FC	Free
16 January 2014	Kareem Moses	North East Stars	(Canada) FC Edmonton	Free
16 January 2014	Conrad Smith	St. Ann's Rangers	Caledonia AIA	Free
16 January 2014	(Jamaica) Kevin Graham	(Jamaica) August Town	Caledonia AIA	Free
17 January 2014	Willis Plaza	(Vietnam) Sông Lam Nghệ An	Central FC	Free
17 January 2014	Leston Paul	Guaya United	Central FC	Free
24 January 2014	Sean de Silva	(United States) Minnesota United FC	Central FC	Free
24 January 2014	Samuel Delice	Defence Force	Central FC	Free
24 January 2014	Jean-Luc Rochford	North East Stars	San Juan Jabloteh	Free
24 January 2014	Kareem Smith	Unattached	San Juan Jabloteh	Free
24 January 2014	Bradley Welch	Unattached	San Juan Jabloteh	Free
24 January 2014	(Jamaica) Shane Mattis	Central FC	San Juan Jabloteh	Free
24 January 2014	(Saint Kitts and Nevis) Mudassa Howe	(Saint Kitts and Nevis) Conaree United	San Juan Jabloteh	Undisclosed
24 January 2014	(Suriname) Dimitrie Apai	(Suriname) SV Transvaal	W Connection	Undisclosed
24 January 2014	(Cameroon) Mendi Kenneth Nzonteu	Unattached	W Connection	Free
24 January 2014	(Saint Lucia) Shawn Evans	Unattached	W Connection	Free
24 January 2014	(Saint Lucia) Levi Francis	Unattached	W Connection	Free
24 January 2014	(Saint Lucia) Eden Charles	(Saint Lucia) Northern United All Stars	W Connection	Free
24 January 2014	(Saint Lucia) Jamil Joseph	(Saint Lucia) Roots Alley Ballers	W Connection	Free
24 January 2014	(United States) Ralph Lundy III	Unattached	Caledonia AIA	Free
24 January 2014	(Saint Lucia) Otev Lawrence	Unattached	Caledonia AIA	Free
24 January 2014	(Saint Lucia) Lester Joseph	Unattached	Caledonia AIA	Free
24 January 2014	(Grenada) Denron Frederick	Unattached	Caledonia AIA	Free
24 January 2014	(Guyana) Pernell Schultz	(Guyana) Fruta Conquerors	Caledonia AIA	Free
24 January 2014	Jesse Peters	Unattached	Caledonia AIA	Free
24 January 2014	Jameel Neptune	Malabar	Caledonia AIA	Free
24 January 2014	Dylon King	Unattached	Caledonia AIA	Free
24 January 2014	Omar Charles	Central FC	Point Fortin Civic	Free
24 January 2014	Kariym Balthazar	Unattached	Point Fortin Civic	Free
24 January 2014	Amare Etienne	Unattached	Point Fortin Civic	Free
24 January 2014	Sean Cooper	(Suriname) Walking Bout Company	Point Fortin Civic	Free
24 January 2014	Keron Neptune	Point Fortin Civic	Central FC	Free
13 March 2014	Aubrey David	Caledonia AIA	(Finland) FF Jaro	Loan
14 March 2014	Marcus Gomez	North East Stars	San Juan Jabloteh	Free
19 March 2014	Shahdon Winchester	W Connection	(Finland) FF Jaro	Loan
28 March 2014	(Jamaica) Keithy Simpson	North East Stars	(Finland) VPS	Undisclosed
3 April 2014	Jamal Gay	Caledonia AIA	(Finland) RoPS	Loan
6 April 2014	Bradley Welch	San Juan Jabloteh	(Australia) Dapto Dandaloo Fury	Free
11 April 2014	Cameron Roget	St. Ann's Rangers	(Finland) Sporting Kristina	Free
27 April 2014	Akim Armstrong	Caledonia AIA	(Finland) FC YPA	Free
19 May 2014	Daneil Cyrus	W Connection	(Vietnam) Hà Nội T&T	Loan
