= 2010 Trinidad and Tobago Goal Shield =

2010 Lucozade Sport Goal Shield
Trinidad and Tobago Goal Shield

Tournament details
- Country: Trinidad and Tobago
- Teams: 11

Final positions
- Champions: North East Stars
- Runners-up: San Juan Jabloteh

Tournament statistics
- Matches played: 9
- Goals scored: 21 (2.33 per match)
- Top goal scorer: Devorn Jorsling (4 goals)

Awards
- Best player: Sean Fraser

The 2010 Trinidad and Tobago Goal Shield was the second edition of the annual Lucozade Sport Goal Shield, which is a knockout tournament competition for teams in the TT Pro League. W Connection entered as the defending champions after they defeated Defence Force 3–0 in the inaugural tournament. Continuing from the previous season, the competition not only allowed the winner and runner-up healthy purses at the end of the tournament, but more so give an added incentive for more goals to be scored throughout the tournament. In particular, the winner of the competition was awarded TT$20,000 plus an additional TT$3,000 for every goal scored in the final, TT$2,000 for every goal in the semifinals, and TT$1,000 for each goal scored in the quarterfinals. Whereas, the runner-up was awarded TT$10,000 plus TT$1,500 for every goal scored in the final, TT$1,000 for every goal in the semifinals, and TT$500 for each goal scored in the quarterfinals.

Due to the refurbishment of Trinidad and Tobago's five major stadiums, ahead of the 2010 FIFA U-17 Women's World Cup, all of the matches were played at Marvin Lee Stadium in Macoya.

== Qualification ==
Seeding was determined from the league standings following the conclusion of the first round of matches in the 2010–11 season. The bottom two teams were placed in a penalty shootout to determine which team would advance to the qualifying round. Teams ranked seventh to ninth were then placed directly into the qualifying round which will determine the seventh and eight spots in the quarterfinals. Finally, the teams ranked from first to sixth automatically qualified for the quarterfinals.

The automatic quarterfinal qualifiers in order of league position were: Defence Force, Joe Public, W Connection, Ma Pau, San Juan Jabloteh, and Caledonia AIA.

== Schedule ==
The schedule for the 2010 Lucozade Sport Goal Shield, as announced by the TT Pro League:

Round	Date	Matches	Clubs	New entries this round
Penalty shootout	23 July 2010	0	11 → 10	2: 10th–11th
Qualifying round	23 July 2010	2	10 → 8	3: 7th–9th
Quarterfinals	30 July 2010	4	8 → 4	6: 1st–6th
Semifinals	6 August 2010	2	4 → 2	
Final	13 August 2010	1	2 → 1	

== Bracket ==
Penalty shootout 23 July 2010
10	FC South End	(5)
11	Police	(3)

Qualifying round 23 July 2010
8	St. Ann's Rangers	0 (5)
9	Tobago United	0 (6)
7	North East Stars	3
10	FC South End	0

Quarterfinals; 30 July 2010
1	Defence Force	5
9	Tobago United	3
4	Ma Pau	1 (2)
5	San Juan Jabloteh	1 (4)
3	W Connection	1
6	Caledonia AIA	0
2	Joe Public	0
7	North East Stars	2

Semifinals; 6 August 2010
1	Defence Force	0
5	San Juan Jabloteh	1
3	W Connection	1
7	North East Stars	2

Final; 13 August 2010
5	San Juan Jabloteh	0
7	North East Stars	1

== Results ==
All matches except the Penalty shootout were played for 90 minutes duration, at the end of which if the match was still tied, penalty-kicks were used to determine the match winner.

=== Penalty shootout ===
The tournament commenced on 23 July with FC South End defeating Police 5–3 in a penalty shootout to determine the tenth team to enter the competition.

23 July 2010	FC South End	v (5–3 p)	Police	Macoya, Trinidad
17:30 (UTC-4)		Report		Stadium: Marvin Lee Stadium
	Penalties
	David (penalty scored); Alleyne (penalty scored); Moses (penalty scored); Bachan (penalty scored); Noel (penalty scored)		Marshall (penalty scored); Arjoon (penalty scored); Andrews (penalty scored); Lamy (penalty missed)

=== Qualifying round ===
In the qualifying round, North East Stars took an early lead over FC South End with a strike from Sean Fraser and eased into the quarterfinals by a 3–0 score. In the other fixture, St. Ann's Rangers and Tobago United needed 16 penalty kicks to determine the winner after the match ended scoreless. Tobago United's goalkeeper, Sean Johnson, provided some brilliant saves during regulation time before pulling off a save against Joseph Peters in the fifth kick of the penalty shootout to help his side win 6–5 from the spot.

23 July 2010	St. Ann's Rangers	0–0 (5–6 p)	Tobago United	Macoya, Trinidad
18:00 (UTC-4)		Report		Stadium: Marvin Lee Stadium
	Penalties
	Belgrave (penalty scored); Narine (penalty scored); McFee (penalty scored); Modeste (penalty missed); Peters (penalty missed); Belgrave (penalty scored); Wilson (penalty scored); Valentine (penalty missed)		McKinnon (penalty scored); Sobers (penalty missed); Ross (penalty scored); Woodley (penalty scored); Warrick (penalty missed); Murray (penalty scored); Charles (penalty scored); Jack (penalty scored)

23 July 2010	North East Stars	3–0	FC South End	Macoya, Trinidad
20:00 (UTC-4)	Fraser 10'; Dwarika 82'; McDonald 89'	Report		Stadium: Marvin Lee Stadium

=== Quarterfinals ===
In the quarterfinals, Devorn Jorsling completed a beaver-trick to help Defence Force advance with a 5–3 victory over Tobago United. Joe Public were knocked out of the tournament following a 2–0 loss to North East Stars. In addition, San Juan Jabloteh advanced to the semifinals after they defeated Ma Pau on penalties 4–2 after the match ended 1–1. The last team to secure their place was W Connection who defeated Caledonia AIA 1–0.

30 July 2010	Defence Force	5–3	Tobago United	Macoya, Trinidad
18:00 (UTC-4)	Jorsling 8', 12', 15', 90'; Roy 55'	Report	Woodley 26'; Sobers 57'; Charles 62'	Stadium: Marvin Lee Stadium; Referee: Ishmael Mohammed

31 July 2010	Ma Pau	1–1 (2–4 p)	San Juan Jabloteh	Macoya, Trinidad
20:00 (UTC-4)	Gray 57'	Report	Williams 36'	Stadium: Marvin Lee Stadium; Referee: Neal Brizan
	Penalties
	Andrews (penalty missed); Gonzales (penalty missed); Power (penalty scored); Wolfe (penalty scored)		Viana (penalty scored); Guerra (penalty scored); Glen (penalty missed); Oliver (penalty scored); Plaza (penalty scored)

30 July 2010	W Connection	1–0	Caledonia AIA	Macoya, Trinidad
20:00 (UTC-4)	Hector 70'	Report		Stadium: Marvin Lee Stadium; Referee: Rashby McPhie

31 July 2010	Joe Public	0–2	North East Stars	Macoya, Trinidad
18:00 (UTC-4)		Report	Fraser 21'; McFarlane 37'	Stadium: Marvin Lee Stadium; Referee: Nigel Roberts

=== Semifinals ===
On 6 August, Defence Force suffered their first defeat of the league season following their loss to San Juan Jabloteh 0–1. In the other semifinal, North East Stars upended the defending champions W Connection by a 2–1 score.

6 August 2010	Defence Force	0–1	San Juan Jabloteh	Macoya, Trinidad
18:00 (UTC-4)		Report	Britto 87'	Stadium: Marvin Lee Stadium; Referee: Lee Davis

6 August 2010	W Connection	1–2	North East Stars	Macoya, Trinidad
20:00 (UTC-4)	Hector 48'	Report	Glasgow 35'; McDonald 90+4'	Stadium: Marvin Lee Stadium; Referee: Shane de Silva

=== Final ===
On 13 August, North East Stars captured the title with the lone goal supplied by Sean Fraser in the 1–0 win over San Juan Jabloteh at Marvin Lee Stadium in Macoya.

13 August 2010	San Juan Jabloteh	0–1	North East Stars	Macoya, Trinidad
20:00 (UTC-4)		Report	Fraser 76'	Stadium: Marvin Lee Stadium; Referee: Neal Brizan
