= 2009 Trinidad and Tobago Goal Shield =

2009 Lucozade Sport Goal Shield
Trinidad and Tobago Goal Shield

Tournament details
- Country: Trinidad and Tobago
- Teams: 11

Final positions
- Champions: W Connection
- Runners-up: Defence Force

Tournament statistics
- Matches played: 9
- Goals scored: 24 (2.67 per match)
- Top goal scorer: Jonathan Faña (5 goals)

Awards
- Best player: Jonathan Faña

The 2009 Trinidad and Tobago Goal Shield was the inaugural season of the Lucozade Sport Goal Shield, which is a knockout tournament competition for teams in the TT Pro League. The structure of the competition not only allowed the winners and runners-up healthy purses at the end of the tournament, but more so give an added incentive for more goals to be scored throughout the tournament. In particular, the winner of the competition was awarded TT$20,000 plus an additional TT$3,000 for every goal scored in the final, TT$2,000 for every goal in the semifinals, and TT$1,000 for each goal scored in the quarterfinals. Whereas, the runner-up was awarded TT$10,000 plus TT$1,500 for every goal scored in the final, TT$1,000 for every goal in the semifinals, and TT$500 for each goal scored in the quarterfinals.

== Qualification ==
Seeding was determined from the league standings after the fourth match day of the 2009 season. However, the teams which played four matches, their goals and points from Match Day 4 were not entered into the qualifying table to ensure that all teams start evenly. Thus, only points from three matches were considered for the draw and the clubs were drawn based on their positions.

The bottom two teams were placed in a penalty shootout to determine which team would advance to the qualifying round. Teams ranked seventh to ninth were then placed directly into the qualifying round which will determine the seventh and eight spots in the quarterfinals. Finally, the teams ranked from first to sixth automatically qualified for the quarterfinals.

The automatic quarterfinal qualifiers in order of league position were: San Juan Jabloteh, United Petrotrin, Joe Public, Caledonia AIA, W Connection, and Defence Force.

== Schedule ==
The schedule for the 2009 Lucozade Sport Goal Shield, as announced by the TT Pro League:

Round	Date	Matches	Clubs	New entries this round
Penalty shootout	29 May 2009	0	11 → 10	2: 10th–11th
Qualifying round	29 May 2009	2	10 → 8	3: 7th–9th
Quarterfinals	12 June 2009	4	8 → 4	6: 1st–6th
Semifinals	19 June 2009	2	4 → 2	
Final	26 June 2009	1	2 → 1	

== Bracket ==
Penalty shootout 29 May 2009
10	FC South End	(2)
11	Tobago United	(4)

Qualifying round 29 May 2009
8	Ma Pau	1
9	St. Ann's Rangers	2
7	Police	0 (3)
11	Tobago United	0 (5)

Quarterfinals; 12 June 2009
1	San Juan Jabloteh	6
9	St. Ann's Rangers	0
4	Caledonia AIA	1
5	W Connection	4
3	Joe Public	1 (2)
6	Defence Force	1 (4)
2	United Petrotrin	0 (4)
11	Tobago United	0 (3)

Semifinals; 19 June 2009
1	San Juan Jabloteh	0
5	W Connection	1
6	Defence Force	3
2	United Petrotrin	1

Final; 26 June 2009
5	W Connection	3
6	Defence Force	0

== Results ==
All matches except the Penalty shootout were played for 90 minutes duration, at the end of which if the match was still tied, penalty-kicks were used to determine the match winner.

=== Penalty shootout ===
On 29 May, Tobago United became the first club to win two penalty shootouts on one night, when they first defeated FC South End in the penalty shootout by a score of 4–2 to advance to the qualifying round.

29 May 2009	Tobago United	v (4–2 p)	FC South End	Macoya, Trinidad
18:30 (UTC-4)				Stadium: Marvin Lee Stadium
	Penalties
	McKinnon (penalty scored); Harris (penalty missed); Cooper (penalty scored); James (penalty scored); Payne (penalty scored)		Teesdale (penalty scored); Williams (penalty scored); De Leon (penalty missed); Leoung-Tat (penalty missed)

=== Qualifying round ===
Thirty minutes after their penalty shootout win, Tobago United faced Police in the qualifying round. The Tobago Boys picked up the unusual achievement by outscoring Police 5–3 on penalties after the match ended 0–0 in regular time.

29 May 2009	Ma Pau	1–2	St. Ann's Rangers	Macoya, Trinidad
21:00 (UTC-4)	Caesar 52'		McFarlane Jr. 54'; Charles 71'	Stadium: Marvin Lee Stadium

29 May 2009	Tobago United	0–0 (5–3 p)	Police	Macoya, Trinidad
19:00 (UTC-4)				Stadium: Marvin Lee Stadium
	Penalties
	McKinnon (penalty scored); Harris (penalty scored); Cooper (penalty scored); James (penalty scored); Payne (penalty scored)		Sam (penalty scored); Eastman (penalty scored); Harris (penalty scored); Foster (penalty missed)

=== Quarterfinals ===
12 June 2009	San Juan Jabloteh	6–0	St. Ann's Rangers	Malabar, Trinidad
20:00 (UTC-4)	Belgrave 25' (o.g.); Marcano 37', 50'; Jamerson 55'; Guerra 59', 90'			Stadium: Larry Gomes Stadium

12 June 2009	Caledonia AIA	1–4	W Connection	Marabella, Trinidad
20:00 (UTC-4)	Joseph 52' (pen.)		Faña 6', 84'; Bartholomew 27'; Hector 76'	Stadium: Manny Ramjohn Stadium

12 June 2009	Tobago United	0–0 (3–4 p)	United Petrotrin	Marabella, Trinidad
18:00 (UTC-4)				Stadium: Manny Ramjohn Stadium
	Penalties
	Morgan (penalty scored); McKinnon (penalty scored); Ortiz (penalty scored); Payne (penalty missed); Harris (penalty missed)		Caseman (penalty scored); Glasgow (penalty scored); Noreiga (penalty scored); Wiltshire (penalty scored)

12 June 2009	Joe Public	1–1 (2–4 p)	Defence Force	Malabar, Trinidad
18:00 (UTC-4)	Highley 34'		Matthews 90'	Stadium: Larry Gomes Stadium
	Penalties
	Baptiste (penalty missed); Mitchell (penalty scored); Rochford (penalty scored); Thomas (penalty missed)		Williams (penalty scored); Rivers (penalty scored); Roy (penalty scored); Matthews (penalty scored)

=== Semifinals ===
19 June 2009	San Juan Jabloteh	0–1	W Connection	Marabella, Trinidad
20:00 (UTC-4)			Faña 37'	Stadium: Manny Ramjohn Stadium; Referee: Geoffrey Hospidales

19 June 2009	United Petrotrin	1–3	Defence Force	Marabella, Trinidad
18:00 (UTC-4)	Daniel 53'		Carter 45', 84'; Jorsling 77'	Stadium: Manny Ramjohn Stadium; Referee: Lee Davis

=== Final ===
The competition culminated with the inaugural final, held at Manny Ramjohn Stadium, Marabella on 26 June. The match was contested by W Connection and Defence Force, with W Connection taking the title 3–0. Jonathan Faña, of Dominican Republic, scored five goals to lead the tournament and W Connection to the title.

26 June 2009	W Connection	3–0	Defence Force	Marabella, Trinidad
20:00 (UTC-4)	Faña 14', 74'; Toussaint 59'			Stadium: Manny Ramjohn Stadium; Referee: Neal Brizan
