= Jonathan Faña =

Dominican footballer

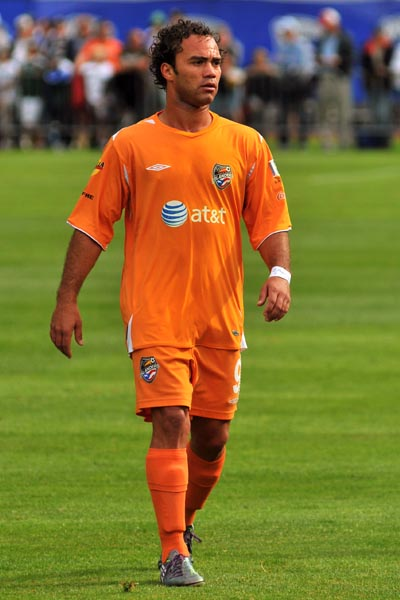
- Faña with the Puerto Rico Islanders in 2010

Personal information
- Full name: Jonathan Rafael Faña Frías
- Date of birth: 11 April 1987 (age 39)
- Place of birth: Moca, Dominican Republic
- Height: 1.73 m (5 ft 8 in)
- Position: Striker

Youth career
- Moca

Senior career*
| Years | Team | Apps | (Gls) |
| 2004–2005 | Moca | 20 | (16) |
| 2006–2010 | W Connection | 100 | (35) |
| 2010–2012 | Puerto Rico Islanders | 95 | (30) |
| 2012 | Bauger | 12 | (4) |
| 2013 | Alianza | 35 | (13) |
| 2014 | San Antonio Scorpions | 1 | (0) |
| 2014 | Moca | 5 | (4) |
| 2015 | Bauger | 18 | (17) |
| 2016 | Cibao | 4 | (6) |
| 2016 | Árabe Unido | 6 | (0) |
| 2017 | Moca | 3 | (4) |
| 2018 | Atlético Pantoja | 1 | (1) |
| 2019 | Club Atlético San Francisco | | |
| Total | | 287 | (121) |

International career
| 2006–2022 | Dominican Republic | 47 | (24) |
- * Club domestic league appearances and goals

Jonathan Rafael Faña Frías (born 11 April 1987) is a Dominican former professional footballer who played as a striker.

Faña is the all-time international top goalscorer of the Dominican Republic national football team with 24 goals.

== Club career ==
Faña began his career with Moca FC in the Dominican Republic, leading the Liga Mayor with 16 goals during the 2004/05 season.

He moved to TT Pro League power W Connection in 2006. Faña quickly established himself at the club and by 2007 was a regular starter, scoring 9 league goals during his first season as a regular starter and playing primarily as a left-sided attacking midfielder. During the 2008 TT Pro League campaign Faña led W Connection with 10 goals.

The 2009 season was Faña's most successful as he impressed at both the local league as well as in CONCACAF competitions. He led W Connection to the 2009 CFU Club Championship helping defeat Puerto Rico Islanders 2–1 in the final on 17 May 2009 and claiming a spot in the CONCACAF Champions League 2009-10. Faña scored both Connection goals in the final and ended as the competition's top scorer with six goals. During the CONCACAF Champions League Faña appeared in seven matches scoring five goals, which included a hat trick on 24 September 2009 in a 3–0 road victory over Guatemalan side CSD Comunicaciones. As a result of his play in the Champions League Faña began to receive interest from Central and North American clubs, including Guatemalan club Xelajú MC.

Faña also helped W Connection capture the inaugural Trinidad and Tobago Goal Shield scoring twice in a 3–0 victory in the 26 June 2009 final versus Defence Force. Faña also finished as the competition's top scorer with five goals. During the 2009 TT Pro League Faña scored 10 goals and including Champions League, CFU Cup, and Goal Shield matches he ended the 2009 campaign with 26 goals in all competitions.

In February 2010 Faña was sent on loan to the Puerto Rico Islanders on a one-year deal with an option to buy when the 2010 USSF D2 Pro League season was over. After the missing the first few months of the season through injury, Faña made his debut for the Islanders on 26 June 2010 as a substitute in a 3–0 loss to the Rochester Rhinos. He remained with Puerto Rico for the 2011 season and was named Player of the Year by the club's fans.

Puerto Rico re-signed Faña for the 2012 season on 9 November 2011. After the Islanders organization went on hiatus in order to restructure, Faña signed with Dominican club Bauger FC in 2012, finishing the season as one of the league's top scorers and steering the club to a third-place finish in the league. After spending a season in his homeland, Faña signed for Alianza F.C. of the Salvadoran Primera División.

On 11 December 2013, it was announced that Faña was returning to the North American Soccer League by signing for the San Antonio Scorpions.

== International career ==
Faña debuted for the Dominican Republic national football team in 2006. He has scored 16 goals in 24 appearances with the national team, and appeared in Caribbean Nations Cup qualifying matches. On 24 March 2013 Faña scored the game-winning goal in a 3–1 victory over Haiti, the Dominican Republic's first-ever victory over their neighboring country.

== Career statistics ==
As of match played 8 June 2016. Dominican Republic score listed first, score column indicates score after each Faña goal.

International goals by date, venue, cap, opponent, score, result and competition
| No. | Date | Venue | Cap | Opponent | Score | Result | Competition |
|---|---|---|---|---|---|---|---|
| 1 | 29 September 2006 | Lionel Roberts Park, Charlotte Amalie, US Virgin Islands | 1 | Bermuda | 1–3 | 1–3 | 2007 Caribbean Cup |
| 2 | 1 October 2006 | Lionel Roberts Park, Charlotte Amalie, US Virgin Islands | 2 | U.S. Virgin Islands | 2–1 | 6–1 | 2007 Caribbean Cup |
| 3 | 1 October 2006 | Lionel Roberts Park, Charlotte Amalie, US Virgin Islands | 2 | U.S. Virgin Islands | 3–1 | 6–1 | 2007 Caribbean Cup |
| 4 | 1 October 2006 | Lionel Roberts Park, Charlotte Amalie, US Virgin Islands | 2 | U.S. Virgin Islands | 4–1 | 6–1 | 2007 Caribbean Cup |
| 5 | 1 October 2006 | Lionel Roberts Park, Charlotte Amalie, US Virgin Islands | 2 | U.S. Virgin Islands | 6–1 | 6–1 | 2007 Caribbean Cup |
| 6 | 8 July 2011 | Estadio Panamericano, San Cristóbal, Dominican Republic | 10 | Anguilla | 2–0 | 2–0 | 2014 FIFA World Cup qualification |
| 7 | 10 July 2011 | Estadio Panamericano, San Cristóbal, Dominican Republic | 11 | Anguilla | 4–0 | 4–0 | 2014 FIFA World Cup qualification |
| 8 | 11 October 2011 | André Kamperveen Stadion, Paramaribo, Suriname | 15 | Suriname | 1–0 | 3–1 | 2014 FIFA World Cup qualification |
| 9 | 27 September 2012 | Kensington Oval, Bridgetown, Barbados | 19 | Dominica | 1–1 | 2–1 | 2012 Caribbean Cup qualification |
| 10 | 27 September 2012 | Kensington Oval, Bridgetown, Barbados | 19 | Dominica | 2–1 | 2–1 | 2012 Caribbean Cup qualification |
| 11 | 23 October 2012 | Stade René Serge Nabajoth, Les Abymes, Guadeloupe | 20 | Guadeloupe | 1–0 | 2–0 | 2012 Caribbean Cup qualification |
| 12 | 23 October 2012 | Stade René Serge Nabajoth, Les Abymes, Guadeloupe | 20 | Guadeloupe | 2–0 | 2–0 | 2012 Caribbean Cup qualification |
| 13 | 27 October 2012 | Stade René Serge Nabajoth, Les Abymes, Guadeloupe | 22 | Puerto Rico | 1–0 | 3–1 | 2012 Caribbean Cup qualification |
| 14 | 27 October 2012 | Stade René Serge Nabajoth, Les Abymes, Guadeloupe | 22 | Puerto Rico | 2–0 | 3–1 | 2012 Caribbean Cup qualification |
| 15 | 7 December 2012 | Antigua Recreation Ground, St. John's, Antigua and Barbuda | 23 | Antigua and Barbuda | 2–1 | 2–1 | 2012 Caribbean Cup |
| 16 | 24 March 2013 | Estadio Panamericano, San Cristóbal, Dominican Republic | 26 | Haiti | 2–0 | 3–1 | Friendly |
| 17 | 7 September 2014 | Antigua Recreation Ground, St. John's, Antigua and Barbuda | 32 | Anguilla | 4–0 | 10–0 | 2014 Caribbean Cup qualification |
| 18 | 7 September 2014 | Antigua Recreation Ground, St. John's, Antigua and Barbuda | 32 | Anguilla | 8–0 | 10–0 | 2014 Caribbean Cup qualification |
| 19 | 8 October 2014 | Ato Boldon Stadium, Couva, Trinidad & Tobago | 33 | Trinidad and Tobago | 1–6 | 1–6 | 2014 Caribbean Cup qualification |
| 20 | 12 October 2014 | Ato Boldon Stadium, Couva, Trinidad & Tobago | 35 | Saint Lucia | 1–0 | 3–2 | 2014 Caribbean Cup qualification |
| 21 | 12 October 2014 | Bermuda National Stadium, Hamilton, Bermuda | 39 | Bermuda | 1–0 | 1–0 | 2017 Caribbean Cup qualification |
| 22 | 7 June 2016 | Estadio Olímpico Félix Sánchez, Santo Domingo, Dominican Republic | 40 | French Guiana | 1–1 | 2–1 | 2017 Caribbean Cup qualification |
| 23 | 7 June 2016 | Estadio Olímpico Félix Sánchez, Santo Domingo, Dominican Republic | 40 | French Guiana | 2–1 | 2–1 | 2017 Caribbean Cup qualification |
| 24 | 28 August 2016 | Estadio Panamericano, San Cristóbal, San Cristóbal, Dominican Republic | 41 | Puerto Rico | 2–0 | 5-0 | Friendly |

== Honours ==
W Connection

- CFU Club Championship: 2006, 2009
- First Citizens Cup: 2006, 2007, 2008
- Pro League Big Six: 2007
- Digicel Pro Bowl: 2007
- Trinidad and Tobago Goal Shield: 2009

Puerto Rico Islanders

- USSF Division 2 Pro League: 2010
- CFU Club Championship: 2010, 2011

Moca FC

- Liga Mayor Coca-Cola: 2014

Bauger FC

- Liga Dominicana de Fútbol Regular Season Champions: 2015

Cibao FC

- Copa Dominicana de Fútbol: 2015 Champions

Atlético Pantoja

- CFU Club Championship: 2018

Individual

- Liga Mayor 2004–05 Top scorer – 16 goals
- 2009 CFU Club Championship Top scorer – 6 goals
- 2009 Trinidad and Tobago Goal Shield Top scorer – 5 goals
- 2011 CFU Club Championship Top scorer - 4 goals
- 2015 Liga Dominicana de Fútbol Top Scorer- 17 goals
- Copa Dominicana de Fútbol: 2015 Top Scorer - 15 goals
