= Dwight Quintero =

Trinidadian professional footballer (born 1994)

Personal information
- Full name: Dwight Quintero
- Date of birth: 20 January 1994 (age 32)
- Place of birth: Blanchisseuse, Trinidad and Tobago
- Height: 1.88 m (6 ft 2 in)
- Position: Striker

Team information
- Current team: Central FC
- Number: 99

Youth career
- 2006–2011: El Dorado East Secondary School
- 2009–2011: Joe Public
- 2012–2013: North East Stars

Senior career*
Years	Team	Apps	(Gls)
2013–	Central FC	16	(3)

International career^{‡}
2010–2011	Trinidad and Tobago U17	6	(0)
2012	Trinidad and Tobago U20	4	(7)
- * Club domestic league appearances and goals as of 13 May 2014 ‡ National team caps and goals as of 9 November 2012

Dwight Quintero (born 20 January 1994) is a Trinidadian professional footballer who plays as a striker for TT Pro League club Central FC.

Quintero's professional career began with Central FC in his native Trinidad and Tobago, where he made his first-team debut in 2013, at the age of 19.

== Early life ==
Quintero was born in Blanchisseuse, Trinidad and Tobago and attended El Dorado East Secondary School, where he repeated his final year to improve himself academically prior to pursuing a career in football. Dwight has stated that his aunt, Tamara, was a significant influence on his early football career as she encouraged and provided him with confidence to have higher aspirations.

In March 2009, Quintero joined the youth program at local club Joe Public and represented the Eastern Lions for three seasons. In 2011, Quintero led El Dorado East's Blue Thunder in his final season with 12 goals, which included two hat-tricks, and the Secondary Schools Football League (SSFL) East Zone title. After Joe Public withdrew from the TT Pro League following the 2010–11 season, Dwight made a switch to fellow Pro League club North East Stars in 2012 and played in their reserve team for two years.

== Club career ==
=== Central FC ===
At the age of 19, Quintero signed a two-year contract with Central FC of the TT Pro League in July 2013. Two months later, he scored a 67th-minute goal in his league debut to give the Sharks a win over defending champions Defence Force in the 2013–14 league opener. In October 2013, Quintero scored in the final of the First Citizens Cup to give Central FC its first major trophy in a 2–1 win over Defence Force. He scored two more goals in the next three league matches against Police on 25 October and a week later against North East Stars on 1 November. Quintero continued his goal scoring form in November with five goals against National Super League clubs Joe Public and 1.FC Santa Rosa, respectively, during the TOYOTA Classic and FA Trophy competitions. He later scored a first-half equaliser for the Sharks in the FA Trophy final against W Connection on 18 December. However, after the arrival of Willis Plaza the next month, playing time was sparse for the remainder of the season. Quintero finished his first professional season with three league goals and 11 goals in all competitions.

== International career ==
Quintero has represented Trinidad and Tobago on various levels of international competition, having been capped for the under-17 and under-20 national teams.

=== Youth teams ===
He began his international career for the under-17 team during qualification for the 2011 CONCACAF U-17 Championship, where he made three second-half substitute appearances. In February 2011, during the continental competition, Quintero made his first start for the Soca Warriors against hosts Jamaica. However, after a lackluster first-half performance he was an early second-half substitution. He went on to make late appearances in the team's final two matches against Guatemala and Canada.

In August 2012, Quintero made three scoreless starts as a lone striker for the under-20 team during their first round of qualification for the 2013 CONCACAF U-20 Championship. However, in November 2012, he made just one appearance for the Soca Warriors, which witnessed the team finish a disappointing bottom in their final qualification group.
