= Trinidad and Tobago Goal Shield =

Lucozade Sport Goal Shield
- Founded: 2009
- Region: Trinidad and Tobago
- Teams: 9
- Current champions: Central FC (1st title)
- Most championships: W Connection (2 titles)
- Website: Goal Shield
- 2014 Goal Shield

The Trinidad and Tobago Goal Shield, or commonly known as the Lucozade Sport Goal Shield for sponsorship reasons, is a knockout tournament competition for football teams competing in the TT Pro League of Trinidad and Tobago. Similar to the First Citizens Cup, it is played on a knockout (single elimination) basis in April and May towards the end of each Pro League season. The structure of the competition not only allows the winner and runner-up healthy purses at the end of the tournament, but more so give an added incentive for more goals to be scored throughout the tournament. In particular, the winner of the competition is awarded TT$30,000 plus an additional TT$3,000 for every goal scored in the final, TT$2,000 for every goal in the semifinals, and TT$1,000 for each goal scored in the quarterfinals. Whereas, the runner-up is awarded TT$10,000 plus TT$1,500 for every goal scored in the final, TT$1,000 for every goal in the semifinals, and TT$500 for each goal scored in the quarterfinals. The knockout tournament is sponsored by Lucozade Sport and is therefore officially known as the Lucozade Sport Goal Shield.

W Connection is the most successful club in the Goal Shield having won the inaugural tournament in 2009 and again in 2013. Central FC are the current holders having defeated their Couva rivals, W Connection, 2–1 on 25 April 2014 to claim their first Goal Shield.

== History ==
The knockout tournament was inaugurated in 2009 and has been captured by four teams in the competition's five-year history. In the inaugural tournament, W Connection defeated Defence Force 3–1. North East Stars secured their first cup title in four years with a 1–0 win over San Juan Jabloteh in 2010. Caledonia AIA became the third team in three years to claim the Goal Shield after winning 3–1 against Defence Force in 2012. In 2013, W Connection won 4–3 in a penalty shootout over North East Stars.

== Format ==
The competition is open to all clubs in the TT Pro League and is divided into three rounds consisting of single-legged matches. With the introduction of the knockout tournament in 2009, eleven teams entered the competition. The bottom two teams in the league standings, at the start of the tournament, were placed into a penalty shootout to determine the team that would advance to the qualifying round. Teams ranked seventh through ninth were placed directly into the qualifying round, which determined the seventh and eighth spots in the quarterfinals. The top six ranked teams automatically entered the competition in the quarterfinals. However, with the contraction of the league to eight teams with the 2011–12 season, the penalty shootout and qualifying rounds were eliminated and all eight teams now enter the competition in the quarterfinals. In 2014, the competition re-introduced the qualifying round to narrow the teams from nine prior to the quarterfinals.

Matches in all rounds are single-legged played for 90 minutes duration, at the end of which if the match is still tied, a penalty shootout is used to determine the match winner.

== Sponsorship ==
The Goal Shield has been sponsored since its inauguration in 2009. The sponsor has been able to determine the competition's sponsorship name. The list below details who the sponsors have been and what they called the competition:

Period	Sponsor	Name
2009–2014	Lucozade Sport (sports drink)	Lucozade Sport Goal Shield

== Finals ==
=== Results ===
Key
*	Match decided in extra time
^{†}	Match decided by a penalty shootout after regulation time
^{‡}	Match decided by a penalty shootout after extra time

Season	Winner	Score	Runners–up	Venue
2009	W Connection	3–0	Defence Force	Manny Ramjohn Stadium
2010	North East Stars	1–0	San Juan Jabloteh	Marvin Lee Stadium
2012	Caledonia AIA	3–1	Defence Force	Hasely Crawford Stadium
2013	W Connection (2)	0–0^{†}	North East Stars	Marvin Lee Stadium
2014	Central FC	2–1	W Connection	Ato Boldon Stadium
2015	Not played			
2016	Morvant Caledonia United	2–2^{†}	W Connection	Hasely Crawford Stadium

== Results by team ==
Club	Wins	Last final won	Runners-up	Last final lost
W Connection	2	2013	2	2016
Morvant Caledonia United (Caledonia AIA)	2	2016	0	
North East Stars	1	2010	1	2013
Central FC	1	2014	0	
Defence Force	0		2	2012
San Juan Jabloteh	0		1	2010
