= Shane Mattis =

Jamaican footballer (born 1980)

Personal information
- Full name: Shane Navajho Mattis
- Date of birth: 17 November 1980
- Place of birth: Saint Catherine Parish, Jamaica
- Position: Goalkeeper

Team information
- Current team: North East Stars F.C.

Youth career
- Waterford High School (Jamaica)

Senior career*
Years	Team	Apps	(Gls)
- Arlington F.C.
2008–2009	St. Ann's Rangers F.C.		
2009–2011	Ma Pau Stars S.C.		
2011–2012	St. Ann's Rangers F.C.		
2012–2014	Central F.C.		
2014–2016	San Juan Jabloteh F.C.		
2016–	North East Stars F.C.		
- * Club domestic league appearances and goals

Shane Mattis is a professional goalkeeper from Jamaica who is currently contracted to North East Stars F.C. in the TT Pro League.

== Career ==
=== Youth ===
Taught football at the Fairview Open Bible Church in Jamaica, Mattis originally played as a striker but switched to goalkeeper at age 14 as his team was without someone who could play in goal.

=== Trinidad and Tobago ===
Involved with a number of Trinidadian clubs, Mattis made two penalty saves in the 2014 First Citizens Cup for San Juan Jabloteh, knocking out Defence Force from the tournament. Also, Mattis made another two penalty stops for the same club in the 2014 Trinidad and Tobago Classic final.

After retirement, the Jamaican wants to be a coach.

=== International ===
Was called up to the Jamaica national football team in 2004 in what he describes as the apotheosis of his career.

== Personal life ==
Having one son, Mattis sees him as his inspiration to play football.
