= Kimarley McDonald =

Jamaican footballer (born 1984)

Personal information
- Full name: Kimarley McDonald
- Date of birth: 2 September 1984 (age 42)
- Place of birth: Jamaica
- Position: Defender

Senior career*
Years	Team	Apps	(Gls)
2008–2009	Boys' Town		
2010–2011	North East Stars	?	(2)
2011	Antigua Barracuda FC	10	(0)
- * Club domestic league appearances and goals as of 16 September 2011

Kimarley McDonald (born 2 September 1984) is a Jamaican footballer who last played for Antigua Barracuda FC in the USL Professional Division.

== Club career ==
McDonald played for Boys' Town in his native Jamaica, and for teams in the Middle East and the United States, before signing for TT Pro League club North East Stars in 2010. He played one season for the Trinidadians, scoring 2 goals.

In 2011 McDonald transferred to the new Antigua Barracuda FC team prior to its first season in the USL Professional Division. He made his debut for the Barracudas on 3 June 2011, a 2–1 loss to the Rochester Rhinos.
