= Christon Baptiste =

Trinidad and Tobago footballer

Personal information
- Date of birth: 25 January 1980 (age 46)
- Place of birth: Carenage, Trinidad and Tobago
- Height: 1.85 m (6 ft 1 in)
- Position: Midfielder

Senior career*
Years	Team	Apps	(Gls)
2004–2013	Defence Force		
2013–2017	Defence Force II		

International career
2007–2008	Trinidad and Tobago	8	(1)
- * Club domestic league appearances and goals

Christon Baptiste (born 25 January 1980) is a retired Trinidadian football player.

== Career statistics ==
=== International ===
National team	Year	Apps	Goals
Trinidad and Tobago	2007	7	1
Trinidad and Tobago	2008	1	0
Total		8	1

=== International goals ===
Scores and results list Trinidad and Tobago's goal tally first.

No	Date	Venue	Opponent	Score	Result	Competition
1.	24 March 2007	Stade Roger Zami, Le Gosier, Guadeloupe	Guadeloupe	1–2	2–2	Friendly
