= Alejandro Figueroa (footballer, born 1978) =

Colombian footballer

Personal information
- Full name: Heiber Alejandro Figueroa Ocoro
- Date of birth: 18 August 1978 (age 48)
- Place of birth: Colombia
- Position: Goalkeeper

Senior career*
Years	Team	Apps	(Gls)
2001–2005	W Connection F.C.		
- Doc's Khelwalaas
- San Juan Jabloteh F.C.
–2009	Joe Public F.C.		
2009–2011	Ma Pau Stars S.C.		
2013–2014	W Connection F.C.		
- * Club domestic league appearances and goals

Alejandro Figueroa (born 18 August 1978) is a Colombian retired footballer who last played for W Connection F.C. of the TT Pro League in Trinidad and Tobago.

== Career ==
Was signed by Ma Pau Stars in December 2009.

Rejoined former club W Connection in January 2013 for the upcoming season.

Put in an immaculate performance in the 2013 Trinidad and Tobago Goal Shield final, making two penalty saves in the shoot-out to deny North East Stars the trophy.
