= Bradley Welch =

Footballer (born 1989)

Personal information
- Date of birth: 14 January 1989 (age 37)
- Place of birth: Brooklyn, New York, United States
- Height: 1.82 m (6 ft 0 in)
- Position: Forward

Youth career
- 2007–2009: Rollins College

Senior career*
Years	Team	Apps	(Gls)
2011	F.C. New York	7	(0)
2013–2014	San Juan Jabloteh	9	(1)
2014	Dapto Dandaloo Fury	18	(7)
2015–2016	South Coast Wolves	18	(5)
2017–	Orlando FC Wolves		
2019–?	Central Florida Panthers		

International career
2007–2012	Trinidad and Tobago U23		(1)
- * Club domestic league appearances and goals

Bradley Welch (born 14 January 1989) is a former footballer who plays as a forward. Born in the United States, he represented Trinidad and Tobago at national level.

== Club career ==
Welch began his youth career with his high school team Cypress Creek High School where he earned several honors. Following high school he signed with Rollins College where he was first called up to Trinidad and Tobago U23s. In 2009, he signed for F.C. New York in their inaugural season in the USL pro, the professional third tier in the United States. After an unsuccessful season he moved to the San Juan Jabloteh in the Trinidad and Tobago TT Pro League. This was to be a short lived move, only scoring once in a stint lasting less than 10 games. As a result, he moved to Australia where he signed with Illawarra Premier League club Dapto Dandaloo in the hope of securing a move to the A-League.

Following a solid 2014 season with Dapto Dandaloo in which he scored five goals, Welch signed with South Coast Wolves in the National Premier Leagues NSW for the 2015 New South Wales National Premier Leagues Men's 1 season.

In March 2019, he was added to the brand new National Premier Soccer League team based out of Orlando, Florida the Central Florida Panthers SC.

== International career ==
Welch represented Trinidad and Tobago at U23 level.
