= Marvin Oliver (footballer) =

Trinidadian association football player

Personal information
- Date of birth: August 15, 1975 (age 51)
- Place of birth: San Juan, Trinidad
- Height: 6 ft 0 in (1.83 m)
- Position: Midfielder

Senior career*
| Years | Team | Apps | (Gls) |
| 1998–1999 | Staten Island Vipers | 48 | (14) |
| 2001 | Broward County Wolfpack | | |
| 2002 | Lauderhill Lions | | |
| 2003 | Uruguay SC | | |
| 2005 | Crab Connection | | |
| 2006 | North East Stars | | |
| 2006–2007 | Crab Connection | | |
| 2007–2008 | Caledonia AIA | | |
| 2008–2010 | San Juan Jabloteh | | |
| 2013 | Central FC | | |
- * Club domestic league appearances and goals

Marvin Oliver is a Trinidadian association football player who played professionally in the United States and Trinidad.

On August 5, 1997, Oliver signed with the Staten Island Vipers of the USISL A-League. In 1998, he was Second Team All League. In 2000, he moved to the Broward County Wolfpack of the Premier Development League. In 2002, Oliver played for the Lauderhill Lions in the amateur Gold Coast Soccer League, moving to Uruguay SC of the same league in 2003. By 2005, Oliver was in Trinidad with Crab Connection. He began the 2006 season with the North East Stars, but was back with Crab Connection by the end of the season. In 2007, Oliver signed with Caledonia AIA before moving to San Juan Jabloteh in 2008. In 2013, he played for Central FC.

== Honors ==
- 1998 Second Team All League
