= Tyrone Charles =

Trinidadian international footballer

Personal information
- Date of birth: 30 November 1988 (age 37)
- Place of birth: Port of Spain, Trinidad and Tobago
- Height: 1.83 m (6 ft 0 in)
- Positions: Left winger; forward

Team information
- Current team: Club Sando

Senior career*
Years	Team	Apps	(Gls)
2012–2013	Central		
2013	St. Ann's Rangers		
2013–2014	Caledonia AIA		
2014	North East Stars		
2014–2017	San Juan Jabloteh		
2017–	Club Sando		

International career^{‡}
2015–	Trinidad and Tobago	8	(1)
- * Club domestic league appearances and goals as of 09:19, 27 March 2018 (UTC) ‡ National team caps and goals as of 09:19, 27 March 2018 (UTC)

Tyrone Charles (born 30 November 1988) is a Trinidadian international footballer who plays for Club Sando as a left winger or forward.

== Career ==
Born in Port of Spain, he has played club football for Central, St. Ann's Rangers, Caledonia AIA, North East Stars, San Juan Jabloteh and Club Sando.

He made his international debut for Trinidad and Tobago in 2015.
