= Andre Toussaint =

Trinidadian footballer (born 1981)

Personal information
- Date of birth: August 26, 1981 (age 45)
- Place of birth: Point Fortin, Trinidad and Tobago
- Height: 5 ft 9 in (1.75 m)
- Position: Forward

Team information
- Current team: W Connection
- Number: 14

Youth career
- Point Fortin Civic F.C.
- 1997–2000: Saint Benedict's College

Senior career*
Years	Team	Apps	(Gls)
1999–2003	Joe Public		
2003–2007	W Connection	?	(29)
2007	Charleston Battery	8	(1)
2007–2010	W Connection	?	(10)
2010–2012	Joe Public	9	(3)
2012	T&TEC Sports Club		
2012–2013	Morvant Caledonia United		
2013–2015	Point Fortin		
2015–	W Connection	5+	(5)

International career^{‡}
2002–2004	Trinidad and Tobago U-23		
2002–2011	Trinidad and Tobago	30	(6)
- * Club domestic league appearances and goals as of 5 May 2009 ‡ National team caps and goals as of 21 August 2011

Andre Toussaint (born August 26, 1981) is a Trinidadian football player. He currently plays for W Connection of the TT Pro League.

== Career statistics ==
=== International ===
Scores and results list Trinidad and Tobago's goal tally first, score column indicates score after each Toussaint goal.

List of international goals scored by Andre Toussaint
No.	Date	Venue	Opponent	Score	Result	Competition
1	28 July 2002	Warner Park Sporting Complex, Basseterre, Saint Kitts and Nevis	Saint Kitts and Nevis	1–?	1–2	Friendly
2	2 August 2003	Warner Park Sporting Complex, Basseterre, Saint Kitts and Nevis	Saint Kitts and Nevis	1–0	2–1	Friendly
3	24 March 2007	Stade Roger-Zami, Le Gosier, Guadeloupe	Guadeloupe	2–2	2–2	Friendly
4	28 May 2007	Hasely Crawford Stadium, Port of Spain, Trinidad and Tobago	Haiti	1–0	1–0	Friendly
5	17 July 2008	Marvin Lee Stadium, Macoya, Trinidad and Tobago	Netherlands Antilles	1–0	2–0	Friendly
6	5 November 2008	Marvin Lee Stadium, Macoya, Trinidad and Tobago	Antigua and Barbuda	3–1	3–2	2008 Caribbean Cup qualification
