= Devon Jamerson =

Trinidad and Tobago footballer

Personal information
- Full name: Devon Jamerson
- Date of birth: 27 August 1988 (age 38)
- Place of birth: Trinidad and Tobago
- Position: Midfielder

Team information
- Current team: Ma Pau

Senior career*
Years	Team	Apps	(Gls)
2009–	Ma Pau		(0)

International career^{‡}
2010–	Trinidad and Tobago	1	(0)
- * Club domestic league appearances and goals as of 06:43, 29 May 2010 (UTC) ‡ National team caps and goals as of 06:43, 29 May 2010 (UTC)

Devon Jamerson (born 27 August 1988), is an international soccer player from Trinidad and Tobago who plays professionally for Ma Pau as a midfielder.
