= Curtis Gonzales =

Trinidad and Tobago footballer

Personal information
- Full name: Curtis Gonzales
- Date of birth: 26 January 1989 (age 37)
- Place of birth: Santa Cruz, Trinidad and Tobago
- Height: 1.83 m (6 ft 0 in)
- Position: Defender

Team information
- Current team: Defence Force

Senior career*
Years	Team	Apps	(Gls)
2010–2011	Ma Pau		
2011–	Defence Force		

International career^{‡}
2012–2021	Trinidad and Tobago	31	(0)
- * Club domestic league appearances and goals as of 15:46, 26 March 2018 (UTC) ‡ National team caps and goals as of 16:26, 15 June 2023 (UTC)

Curtis Gonzales (born 26 January 1989) is a Trinidad and Tobago international footballer who plays for Defence Force, as a defender.

== Career ==
Gonzales has played club football for Ma Pau and Defence Force.

He made his international debut for Trinidad and Tobago in 2012.
