= Macoya =

Coordinates: 10°38′29.79″N 61°23′5.14″W

- Community
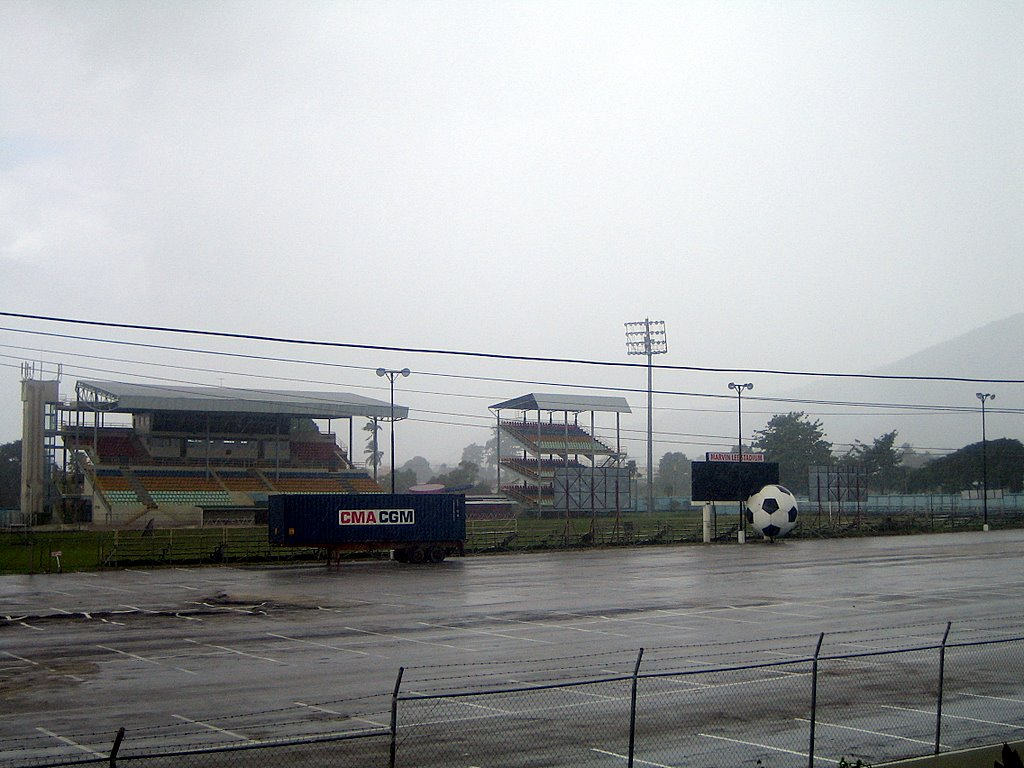
- Marvin Lee Stadium, Macoya
- Interactive map of Macoya
- Country: Trinidad and Tobago
- Region: Tunapuna-Piarco

Population (2011)
  - Total: 2,130
- Postal Code: 3306xx, 3307xx

Macoya is a community located alongside the Churchill-Roosevelt Highway in the Tunapuna-Piarco region in Trinidad and Tobago. It is located between downtown Tunapuna and Trincity.

It is composed primarily of:

- Macoya/Trincity industrial estate - commercial warehouses
- Macoya Gardens - a small residential neighbourhood.
- Macoya village - located around
- Macoya Road near Constantine park
- Macoya extension - a developing community, south bound of centre of excellence.
- The Marvin Lee Stadium, a football facility that hosts domestic and international football matches as well as the adjacent João Havelange Centre of Excellence are located in Macoya.
