= Lucozade =

British carbonated glucose drink

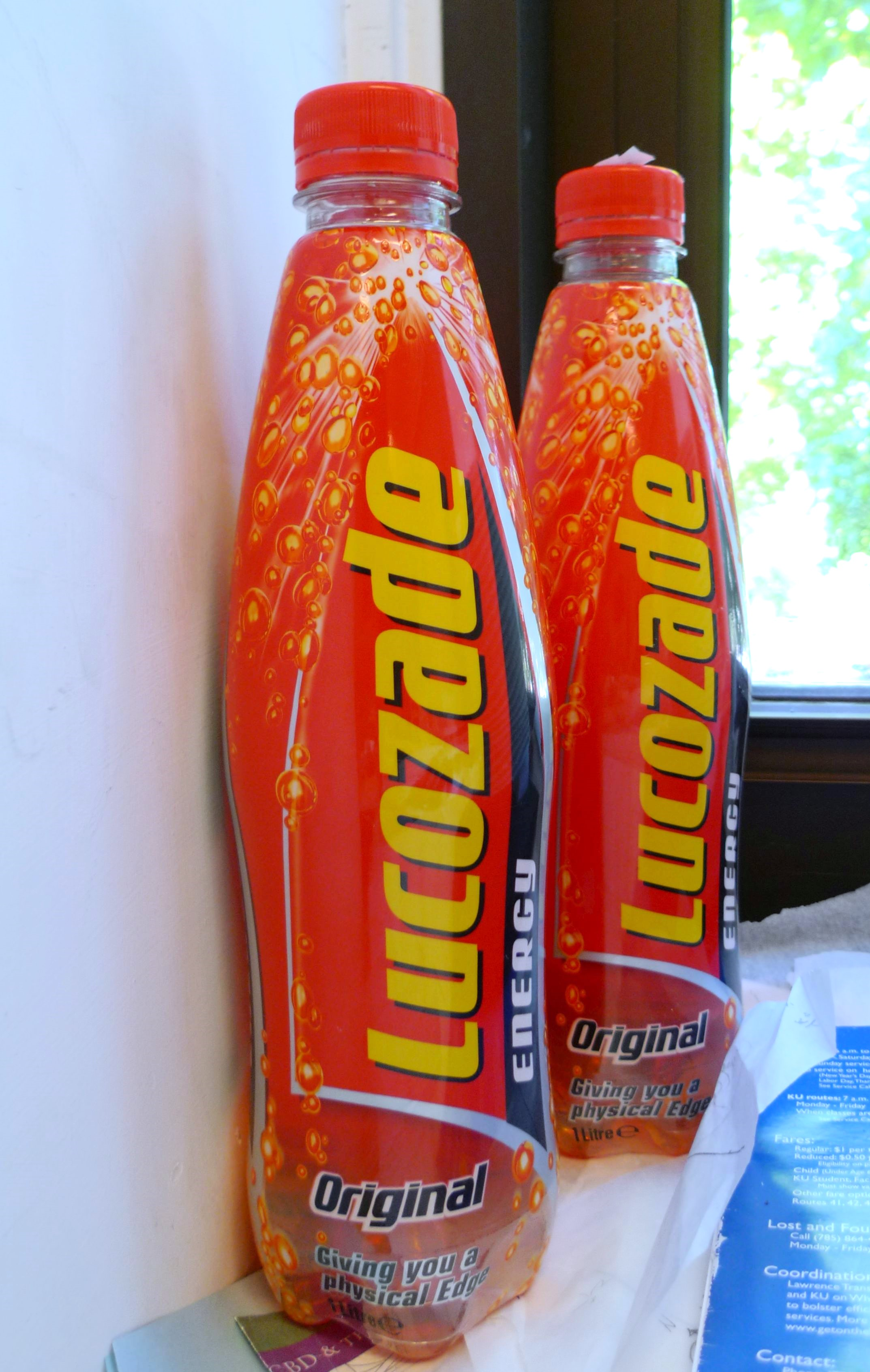
- Bottles of Lucozade Original
- Type: Soft drink
- Manufacturer: Suntory
- Origin: Newcastle upon Tyne, England
- Introduced: 1927; 99 years ago
- Website: lucozade.com

Lucozade is a British brand of soft drinks and energy drinks manufactured and marketed by the Japanese company Suntory since 2013. Created as "Glucozade" by a Newcastle pharmacist, William Walker Hunter (trading as W. Owen & Son) (Note: "LUCOZADE-—Word mark. Wares: Non-alcoholic and carbonated beverages of all kinds and essences and syrups for making same. William Walker Hunter, trading as W. Owen & Son, 151, Barras Bridge, Newcastle-uponTyne, England. NS.") in 1927, it was acquired by the pharmaceutical company Beecham's in 1938 and sold as Lucozade, an energy drink for the sick. It was sold mostly in pharmacies up until the 1980s before it was more readily available as a sports drink across Britain.

A glucose and water solution, the product was sold until 1983 as a carbonated, slightly orange-flavoured drink in a glass bottle wrapped in cellophane. Pharmacists sold it, children were given it when ill, and hospital visitors would regularly arrive with a bottle. (Note: "Dilly" (Poppadom Preach, 2011). "[Dr Johnson suspected that Egg had] picked up a bug of some sort. He said she needed plenty to drink, and suggested Lucozade. Suddenly I wished I was sick as well, because my friendship with Estie had given me a taste for Lucozade: the smell, the bright orange colour, the cellophane wrapping (which could later be used to make X-ray specs), the glugging as it left the bottle like a fizzy golden waterfall, the tiny bubbles jumping out of the glass and popping in the air." James Willocks and Wallace Barr (2004): "a rush of friends and relations clutching the traditional bunch of flowers and bottle of Lucozade". "Adrian Mole" (The Lost Diaries of Adrian Mole, 1999–2001, 2009): "Personally I think it was a great mistake to provide hospital patients with bedside telephones. They give their long-suffering relations no peace with their incessant, peevish demands for Lucozade and boxes of tissues.") It was rebranded in 1978 as a "pick me up", and as a sports drink in 1983, to associate it with health rather than sickness. The company switched to a plastic bottle and introduced a range of flavours. As of 2016, a 500 ml bottle contained 62 g (15.5 cubes) of sugar, more than Coca-Cola. In 2017, to avoid the sugar tax, the drink was reformulated to contain 22.5 g of sugar per 500 ml of liquid, as well as the artificial sweeteners aspartame and acesulfame K. In 2023, it was reformulated again. It still contains the same amount of sugar, and features the sweeteners Acesulfame K, and Sucralose.

Lucozade is the highest-selling energy drink in Britain and Ireland, and it has also been sold in markets in Africa, Asia and Australasia. In 1989, the Beecham Group merged to form SmithKline Beecham, which further merged in 2000 to form GlaxoSmithKline. In September 2013, GlaxoSmithKline sold Lucozade and another soft drink, Ribena, to the Japanese drinks conglomerate Suntory for £1.35 billion.

== History ==
Lucozade history section at Gunnersbury Park museum, London

"Like many brands that are now global names, the history of Lucozade is complex, and several names have been cited as the inventors of the drink. However, Newcastle University credits Professor Pybus as the real creator of the reviving glucose drink. Pybus never benefitted from his idea, but the chemist did. He was William Walker Hunter, and his company traded as W. Owen & Son."

— Historian Dr Miriam Bibby on the origin of Lucozade in the 1920s.

Newcastle University credits Professor Frederick Pybus as the creator of "Glucozade". Pybus, a surgeon at the Royal Victoria Infirmary in Newcastle, England, and his colleagues developed a glucose drink that was energy-giving, which was given to children up to the time of their operation. The drink was carbonated, with historian Miriam Bibby writing: "the "ade" part made it clear that it was a soft drink. It also suggested aid, as in assistance, first aid, or aiding the sick." In 1927, the chemist William Walker Hunter, also from Newcastle, commercialised the drink. Hunter sold the product to the Beecham Group in 1938 and it was eventually renamed Lucozade.

Lucozade originally was available in only one variety, which was effervescent with a distinctive sweet citric flavour. It was sold in a glass bottle with a yellow cellophane wrap until 1983, when it was re-branded as an energy drink to remove the brand's associations with illness. The slogan "Lucozade aids recovery" as used in the 1960s and 1970s was replaced by "Lucozade replaces lost energy". The glass bottle was replaced by a plastic (polyethylene terephthalate (PET)) one. After the re-branding, UK sales tripled to almost £75 million between 1984 and 1989.

Two additional flavoured varieties arrived in 1986: Orange and Lemon. In 1990, Tropical became a fourth flavour. Lucozade underwent a major relaunch in 1996 with a new 300 mL bottle and a new Lucozade Energy logo.

In 1989, the Beecham Group and SmithKline merged to form SmithKline Beecham, and in 2000 SmithKline Beecham and GlaxoWellcome merged to form GlaxoSmithKline (GSK). In 2013, GSK put Ribena and Lucozade up for sale. Suntory, a Japanese holding company, bought the brands in September for £1.35 billion. At the time of the sale, the product was manufactured in England at the Royal Forest Factory in Coleford, Gloucestershire, in the Forest of Dean.

== Commercials ==
Originally as a health product, Lucozade's advertising slogan was "Lucozade. Aids recovery". Following its rebranding as a sports drink, high-profile athletic figures in British pop culture have promoted Lucozade in television commercials, beginning with Olympic decathlon champion Daley Thompson in 1983, followed by sporting figures such as Olympic sprint champion Linford Christie, footballers John Barnes and Alan Shearer, rugby player Jonny Wilkinson, and Tomb Raider heroine Lara Croft.

== Purpose and effectiveness ==
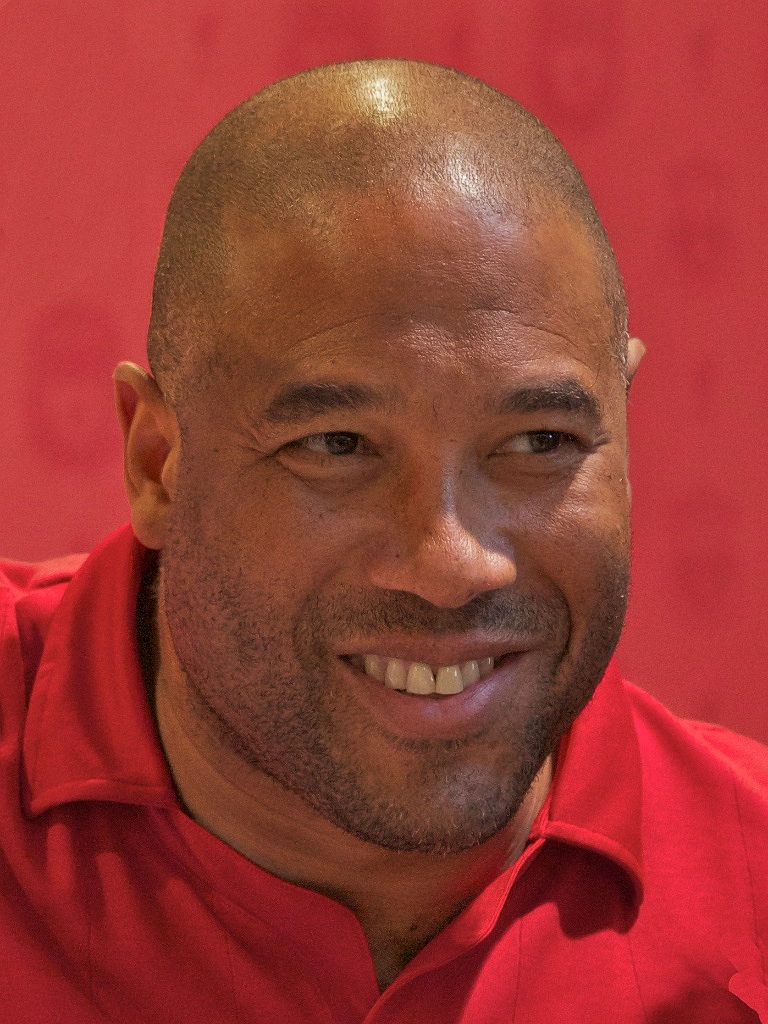
Sponsored by Lucozade, footballer John Barnes appeared in an early 1990s commercial, stating: "this is Isotonic Lucozade Sport, it gets to your thirst, fast".

A stated purpose of sports drinks, which provide many calories of energy from sugars, is to improve performance and endurance. In a 2012 analysis by Matthew Thompson and colleagues from the Oxford Centre for Evidence Based Medicine, of 431 marketing claims of performance enhancement, most cited no evidence. 174 sources were cited for Lucozade; of them, Thompson found only three studies of high quality with a low risk of bias. The rigorous studies that did show improved endurance were "of limited relevance to most people because the tests were on elite athletes". This was backed up by a research study done on professional cyclists, to see if ingesting Lucozade before an hour bike ride would impact performance. The study could not find any positive impact on performance after ingesting it. Thompson said that for the vast majority of people, drinking such products "could completely counteract exercising more, playing football more, going to the gym more".

Lucozade comes in the form of liquid in either a can or plastic bottle, or it can come in the form of a tablet. The tablets have the flavours of either orange or the original flavour.

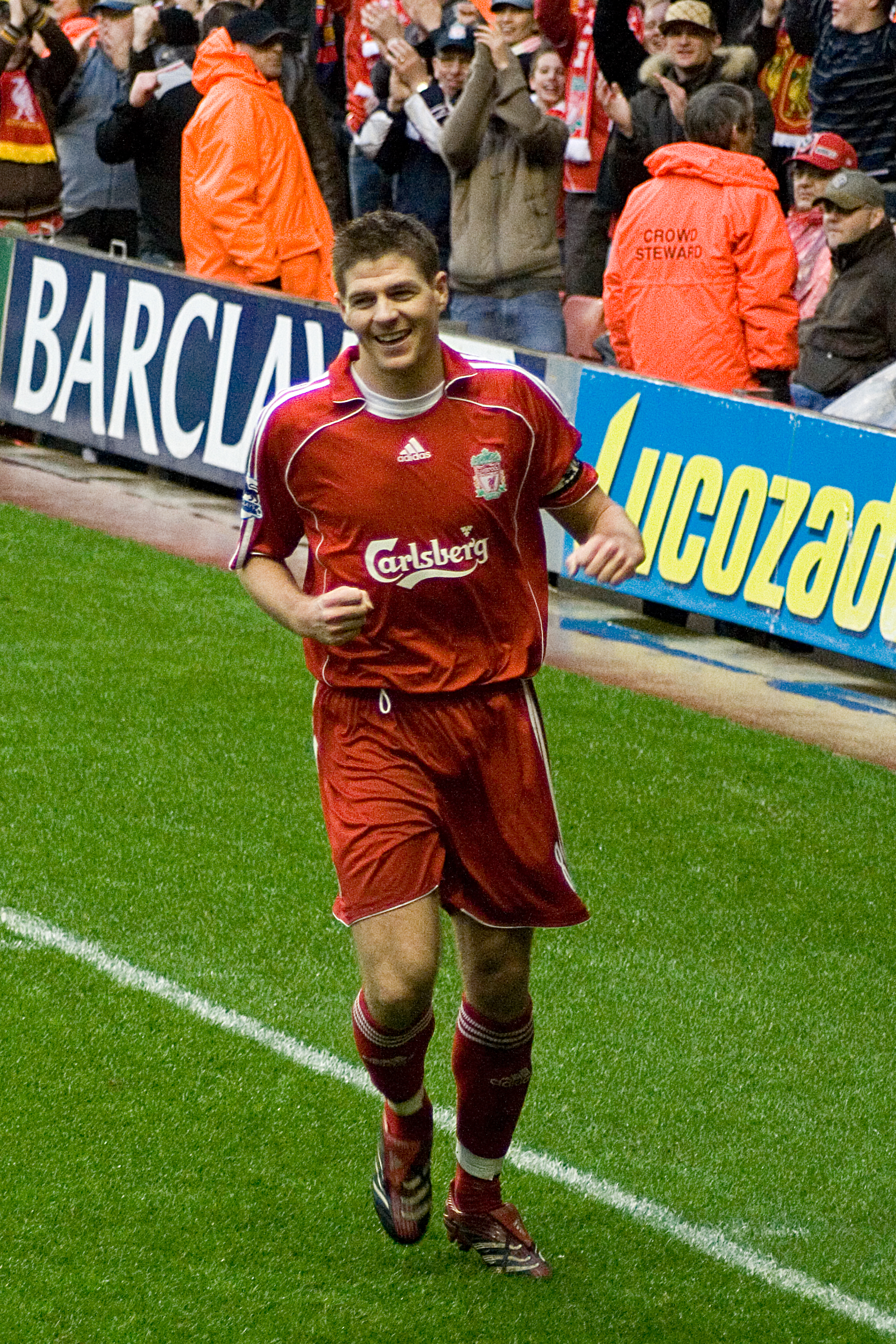
Lucozade appearing on an advertising hoarding to the right in 2007 as a sponsor of the Premier League

The drinks are marketed as soft drinks; a soft drinks industry spokesman said in response: "By helping people participating in sport to perform better and to recover more quickly, sports drinks can encourage people to exercise more".

In May 2016, Liverpool City Council ran a "name-and-shame campaign" entitled "Is your child's sweet tooth harming their health?". The short-lived campaign claimed that Lucozade was "the worst offender", containing 62 grams of sugar in a 500 ml bottle, followed by Coca-Cola with 54 grams. Posters for the campaign were displayed in hospitals for a time.

In its original high-sugar formulation, Lucozade was recommended by British diabetes charities as an immediate treatment for hypoglycaemia in individuals who take insulin. Since the drink now includes artificial sweeteners, guidelines have been amended to state that Lucozade should not be used to treat diabetic hypoglycaemia.

== Composition ==
While the ingredients vary somewhat from one drink to another, those of the Lucozade Original Energy were listed as follows in 2013: carbonated water, glucose syrup (25%), citric acid (E330), lactic acid (E270), flavouring (unspecified), preservatives (potassium sorbate, sodium bisulphite (E-222)), caffeine, antioxidant (ascorbic acid), colour (sunset yellow (E110), Ponceau 4R). After the reformulation to lower sugar in 2017, and another reformulation in 2023, Lucozade Original contains less glucose syrup, and the sweeteners sucralose and acesulfame K.

A warning is printed on the packaging that the colouring may have an adverse effect on activity and attention in children. Lucozade contains 0.01% ethanol (alcohol), which meant that observant Muslims could not drink it. However, in 2004, the Muslim Council of Britain ruled that they saw no harm in consuming Lucozade which contains traces of ethyl alcohol that do not bear its original qualities and do not change the taste, colour or smell. GlaxoSmithKline pointed out that fruit juices and bread could also contain the same or higher trace amounts of alcohol due to natural fermentation.

== Variants ==
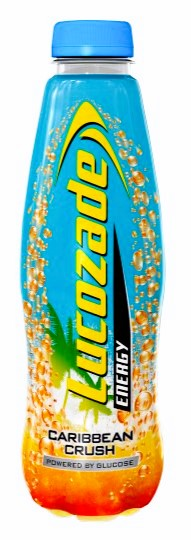
Caribbean Crush

=== Lucozade Energy ===
- Original
- Orange
- Wild Cherry
- Wild Berry
- Pink Lemonade
- Lemon
- Cloudy Lemon
- Tropical
- Mixed Berry
- Strawberry
- Raspberry Ripple
- Watermelon & Strawberry
- Melonade
- Caribbean Crush
- Brazilian Mango & Mandarin
- Citrus Chill
- Citrus Clear
- Grafruitti
- Pineapple Punch
- Tropical Fusion
- Black Edition Cola
- Blackcurrant
- Blue Burst

=== Lucozade Zero ===
- Original
- Orange
- Pink Lemonade
- Tropical
- Grafruitti

=== Lucozade Sport ===
- Orange
- Caribbean Burst
- Brazilian Guava
- Raspberry
- Cherry
- Mango & Passion Fruit
- Fruit Punch (AJ Edition)
- Low Cal - Orange
- Low Cal - Lemon & Lime
- Blue Force
- Ice Kick (Jude Bellingham Edition)

=== Lucozade Alert ===
- Original
- Tropical Burst
- Cherry Blast
- Blue Rush

== Sponsorships ==
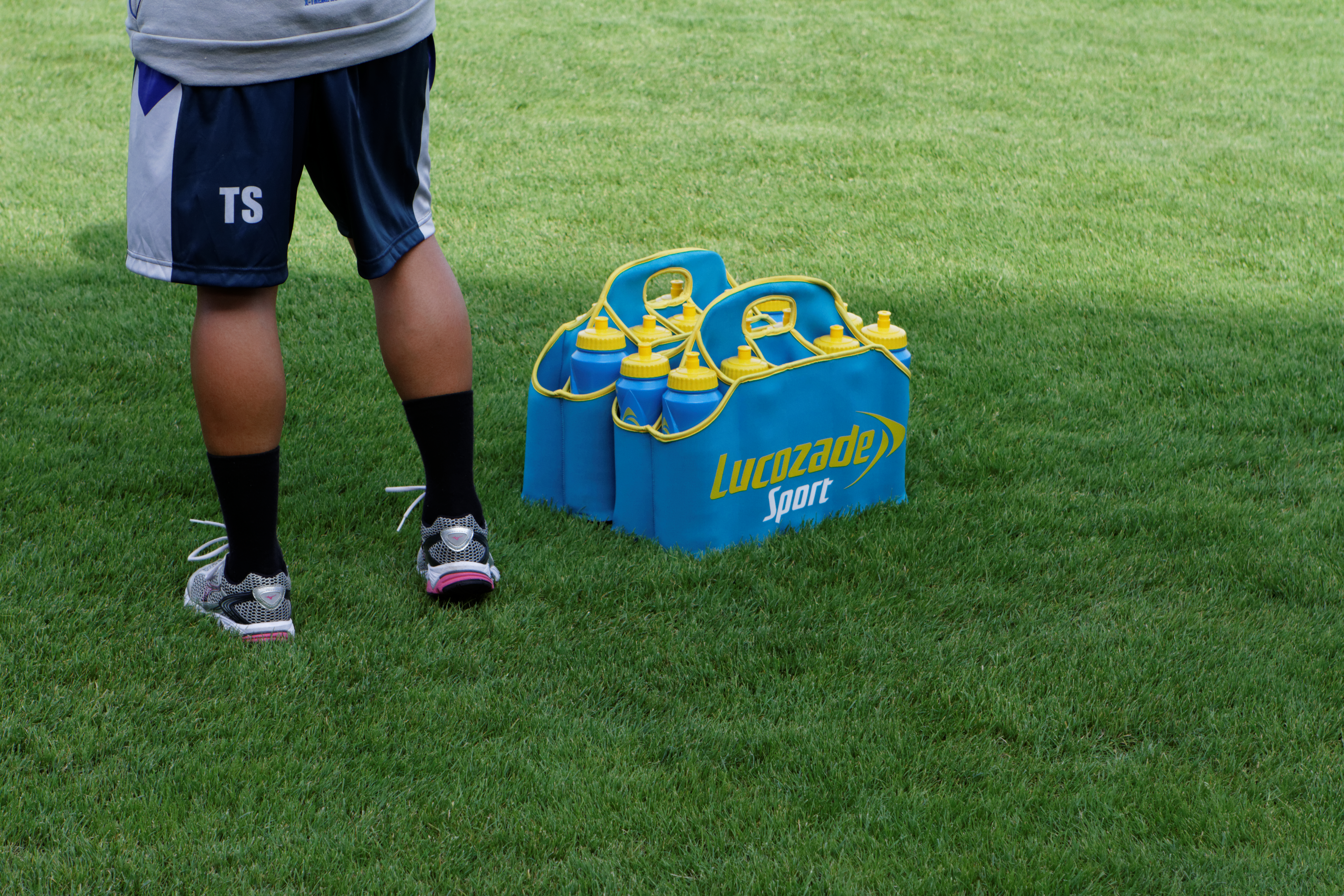
Lucozade Sport during the 2014 Women's Rugby World Cup in France

Lucozade Sport is a major sponsor of events, teams and athletes in the UK and Ireland, including the Amateur Rowing Association (ARA), Premier League (and clubs such as Liverpool F.C.), FA Cup, England Rugby Football Union, England Football Team, the Republic Of Ireland Football Team, the London Marathon, Parkrun, Michael Owen and Steven Gerrard.

The McLaren Formula One team was previously sponsored by Lucozade. The brand has also sponsored Jamaican sprinter Asafa Powell since he first broke the 100 m World Record in 2005. They honoured his Beijing Summer Olympics achievements with a small function in October 2008.

Although soft drink representation in video games had appeared occasionally beforehand, the game Superfrog (originally released in 1993) featured Lucozade overtly, as a result of Lucozade sponsoring the game. Bottles of Lucozade are collectable power-ups which give the title character super powers.

== Collaborations ==
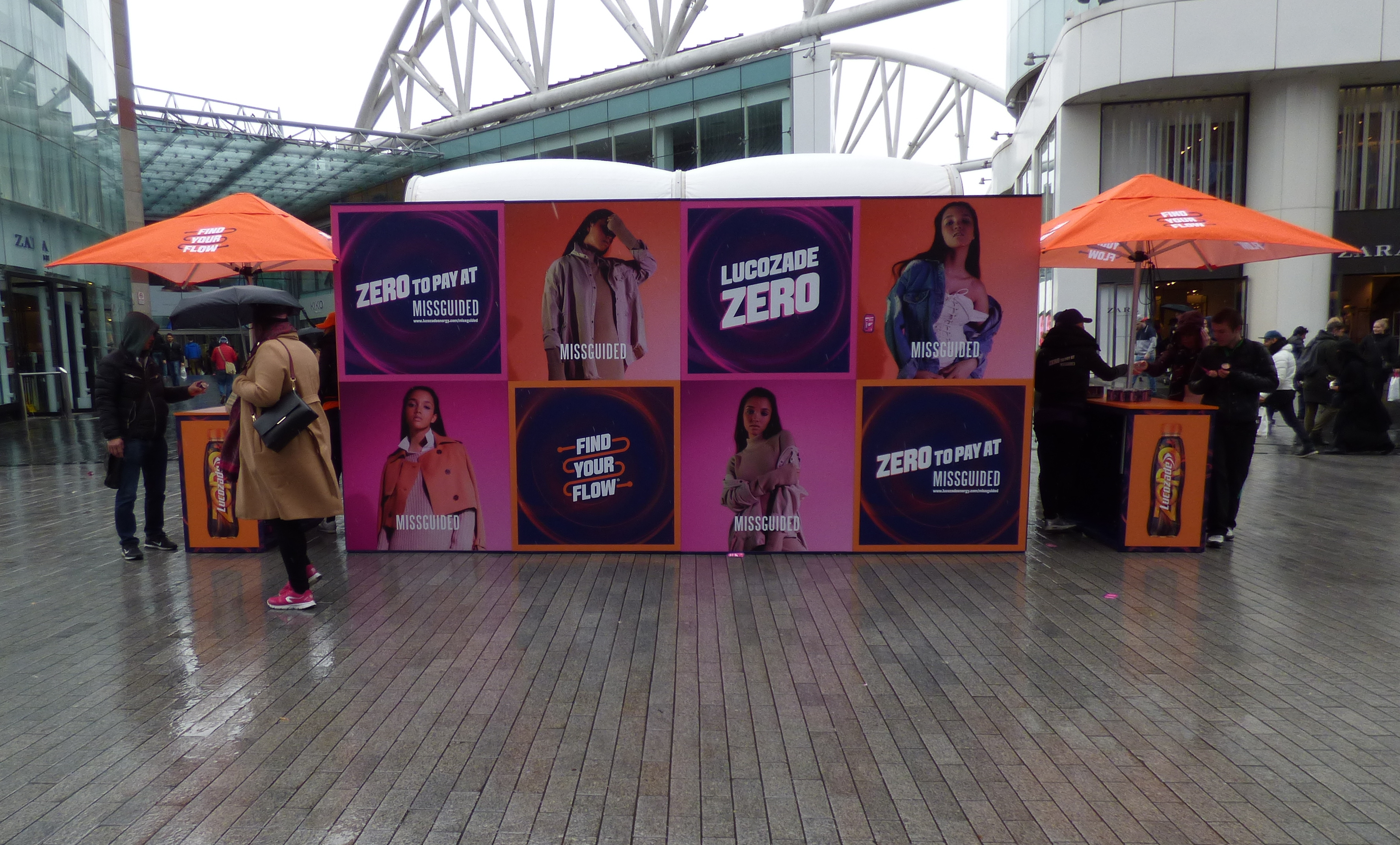
A Lucozade Zero booth marketing a tie-in with Missguided in 2017 in Birmingham

In 2017, British fashion supplier Missguided was included in a campaign by Lucozade Zero. Coded cans were offered at booths in crowded areas that entitled drinkers to discounts on Missguided products.
