= Central F.C. =

Association football club in Trinidad and Tobago

Central FC
- Full name: Central Football Club
- Nickname: The Sharks
- Founded: July 2012; 14 years ago
- Ground: Ato Boldon Stadium; Couva, Trinidad and Tobago
- Capacity: 10,000
- Operation Director: Brent Sancho, Kevin Harrison
- Head Coach: Vacant
- League: TT Pro League
- 2025–26: TT Pro League, 7th
Away colours

Central Football Club is a Trinidad and Tobago professional football club, based in California, that plays in the TT Pro League. Founded in 2012, the Sharks were the 21st team to join the Pro League and plays its home matches in Ato Boldon Stadium located in nearby Couva.

== History ==
Central FC was founded in July 2012, with the ambition to become a high achieving club on the pitch and an active club within its community. In the club's first season, Central completed twelve projects designed to promote football within the local community. Former Trinidad and Tobago international football player Brent Sancho was the Chief Executive Officer.

On 13 August 2012, former Arsenal and England international Graham Rix was named the club's first manager for their inaugural Pro League season. However, when Rix resigned after only five months and returned to his native England, the club appointed former San Juan Jabloteh manager and England international Terry Fenwick.

=== Inaugural season ===
Central FC began play in the 2012–13 TT Pro League season with their first match on 19 October 2012, against Police, which they won 1–0 following a goal from former captain Anthony Wolfe. The Sharks finished in a solid fifth position after their inaugural Pro League season having won eight from their 21 matches. However, the club's most significant accomplishment during their first season came in the FA Trophy after advancing to the final before losing 1–0 to Caledonia AIA.

Following the season, Central hosted a pre-season tour of Trinidad and Tobago for Football League One club, Walsall in July 2013. During the England club's visit, Central arranged for the Saddlers to visit four coaching schools and compete in three exhibition matches. The tour also provided four Central FC players a week trial with Walsall.

== Managers ==
- (England) Graham Rix (2012)
- (England) Terry Fenwick (2013–2014)
- (Federal Republic of Yugoslavia) Zoran Vranes (2014–2015)
- (Trinidad and Tobago) Dale Saunders (2016–2017)
- (Trinidad and Tobago) Stern John (2017–2020)

== Players ==
Note: Flags indicate national team as defined under FIFA eligibility rules; some limited exceptions apply. Players may hold more than one non-FIFA nationality.

No.	Pos.	Nation	Player
18	GK	TTO	Marvin Phillip
-	GK	TTO	Keinol Paul
1	GK	TTO	Jabari Brice
21	GK	TTO	Levi Fernández
2	DF	TTO	Joshua Ragoo
24	DF	TTO	Tariq Mulraine
-	DF	TTO	Noel Williams
5	DF	TTO	Jamal Jack
4	DF	TTO	Malik Mieres
15	DF	TTO	Seon Thomas
3	DF	TTO	Joevin Jones
17	DF	TTO	Ross Russell Jr.
-	DF	TTO	Damani Richards
-	DF	TTO	Jameel Neptune
16	DF	TTO	Alvin Jones
6	MF	TTO	Daniel David

No.	Pos.	Nation	Player
12	MF	TTO	Rhondel Gibson
14	MF	TTO	Liam Burns
20	MF	TTO	Emmanuel Thomas
26	MF	TTO	Jared London
8	MF	TTO	Jameel Antoine
-	MF	TTO	Julio Noel
45	MF	TTO	Kadeem Corbin
7	FW	TTO	Tyrone Charles
11	FW	TTO	Sedale McLean
19	FW	TTO	Gary Griffith
-	FW	TTO	Sean Bonval
9	FW	TTO	Isaiah Lee
-	FW	TTO	Jamal Gay
-	FW	TTO	Ja-Shawn Thomas
-	FW	TTO	Kenton James
29	FW	TTO	Miquel Williams

== Honours ==
=== Domestic ===
- TT Pro League
  - Winners (3): 2014–15, 2015–16, 2016–17
- FA Trophy
  - Runners-up (2): 2012–13, 2013–14
- First Citizens Cup
  - Winners (2): 2013, 2014
- Lucozade Sport Goal Shield
  - Winners (1): 2014

=== Regional ===
- CFU Club Championship
  - Winners (2): 2015, 2016
