= Marvin Lee Stadium =

Stadium in Trinidad and Tobago

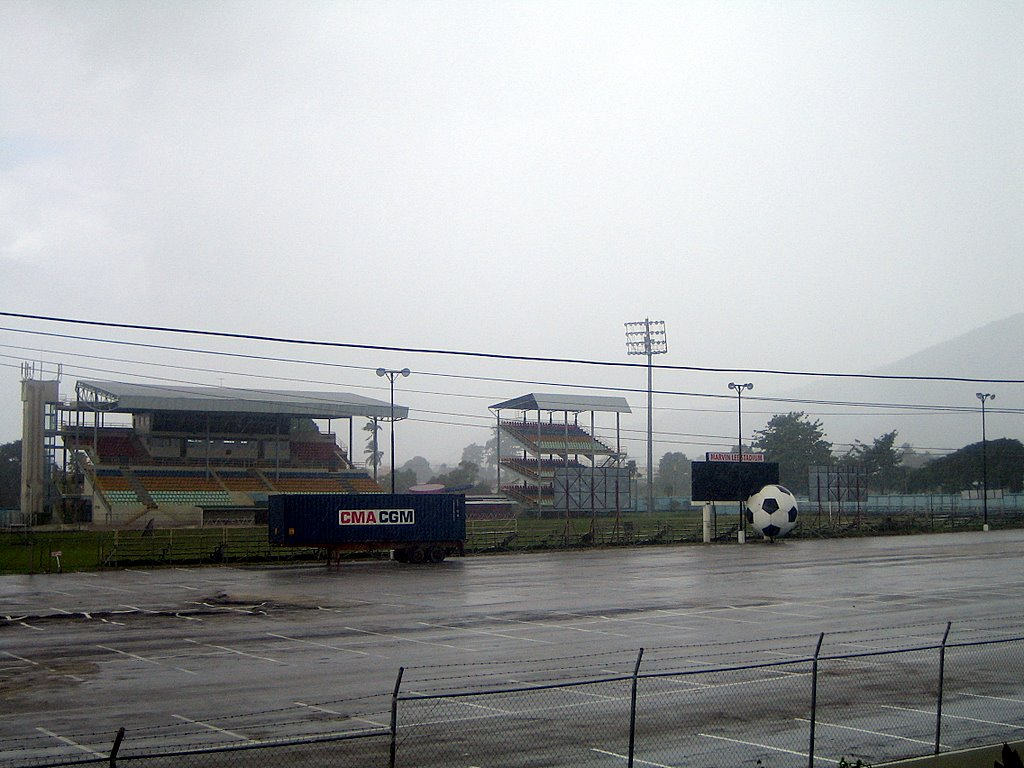
- Interactive map of Marvin Lee Stadium
- Location: Macoya, Trinidad
- Coordinates: 10°38′29.79″N 61°23′5.14″W
- Capacity: 6,000
- Surface: Astroturf

Tenant
- Joe Public F.C.

Marvin Lee Stadium is a multi-purpose stadium in Macoya, Trinidad and Tobago which is housed together with the Dr. João Havelange Centre of Excellence. It is used mostly for football matches and is the home stadium of Joe Public F.C. The stadium holds approximately 6,000 people.

The stadium was named after defender and national Under-20 football captain Marvin Lee, who sustained head and neck injuries suffered in a collision with Landon Donovan in an U-20 game versus the USA. He was left paralysed after the incident and later succumbed to illness as a result of his weakened state. Lee was later recognised by the government of Trinidad for his service to the nation.

In 2007, the stadium became the first in the Caribbean to have an artificial playing surface, costing TT$8 million, which was made possible through a FIFA development grant. The first game was a TT Pro League encounter, where Caledonia AIA scored a narrow win over Joe Public F.C. It was also host on June 15, 2008 to a World Cup qualifier between Trinidad and Bermuda which Bermuda won 2–1.
