= Defence Force F.C. =

Football club in Trinidad and Tobago

- Full name: Defence Force Football Club
- Nickname: Teteron Boys
- Founded: 1962; 64 years ago (As Regiment FC)
- Ground: Hasely Crawford Stadium; Port of Spain, Trinidad and Tobago
- Capacity: 23,000
- Manager: Marvin Gordon
- League: TT Premier Football League
- 2025–26: 1st (Champions)
Home colours	Away colours

Defence Force Football Club is a football club based in Chaguaramas, Trinidad and Tobago that currently plays in the country's TT Premier Football League. The team plays its home games in the Hasely Crawford Stadium in Port of Spain.

== History ==
Founded in 1974, Defence Force F.C. is the nation's most successful football club, winning 20 national championships. They won 15 titles in twenty-two seasons in the National League from 1974 to 1995, two titles in the Semi-Professional League between 1996 and 1998, and three championships since the Trinidad and Tobago league became professional in 1999 with the Pro League. They are also the only team from Trinidad and Tobago to have ever won the CONCACAF Champions' Cup, having won titles in 1978 and 1985. In 1985, Defence Force achieved the treble, winning the National League, FA Trophy, and CONCACAF Champions' Cup. They are one of only three teams in the CONCACAF Federation to have achieved this feat, along with Cruz Azul and Monterrey and the only CONCACAF club outside of Mexico. Also, this was the last time a Caribbean club won the Champions Cup.

Since the club is composed of Trinidad and Tobago's protective forces, they are named Defence Force F.C. Usually included are officers, soldiers, and sailors from the Trinidad and Tobago Army and Coast Guard.

== Players ==
Note: Flags indicate national team as defined under FIFA eligibility rules; some limited exceptions apply. Players may hold more than one non-FIFA nationality.

No.	Pos.	Nation	Player
31	GK	TTO	Christopher Biggette
80	GK	TTO	Jabari St. Hillaire
-	DF	TTO	Jaheim Joseph
3	DF	TTO	Isaiah García
5	DF	TTO	Jerome McIntyre
6	DF	TTO	Rodell Elcock
7	DF	TTO	Jelani Felix
17	DF	TTO	Curtis Gonzales
23	DF	TTO	Jamali Garcia
26	DF	TTO	Justin Garcia
37	DF	TTO	Cassim Kellar
10	MF	TTO	Hashim Arcia
12	MF	TTO	Jemel Sebro
13	MF	TTO	Rivaldo Coryat
21	MF	TTO	Justin Sadoo
22	MF	TTO	Darius Ollivierra

No.	Pos.	Nation	Player
32	MF	TTO	Jameel Cooper
34	MF	TTO	Keilon Burnett-Acevaro
66	MF	TTO	Kevon Goddard
-	FW	TTO	Kevin Molino
-	FW	TTO	Kathon St. Hillaire
-	FW	TTO	Jamille Boatswain
45	FW	TTO	Kaihim Thomas
8	FW	TTO	Brent Sam
9	FW	TTO	Devorn Jorsling
11	FW	TTO	Dwight Quintero
14	FW	TTO	Kendell Hitlal
15	FW	TTO	Shaquille Bertrand
16	FW	TTO	Lashawn Roberts
24	FW	TTO	Shaquille Holder

== Club honours ==
=== League honours ===
- TT Premier Football League and predecessors
  - Winners (26): 1972, 1973, 1974, 1975, 1976, 1977, 1978, 1980, 1981, 1984, 1985, 1987, 1989, 1990, 1992, 1993, 1995, 1996, 1997, 1999, 2010–11, 2012–13, 2019–20, 2023, 2024–25, 2025–26

=== Cups and trophies ===
- FA Trophy
  - Winners (6): 1974, 1981, 1985, 1989, 1991, 1996.
  - Runners-up (4): 1995, 1998, 2005, 2012.
- First Citizens Cup
  - Winners (3): 2002, 2009, 2016.
  - Runners-up (5): 2000, 2004, 2010, 2012, 2013.
- Digicel Charity Shield
  - Runners-up (3): 2012, 2013, 2016.
- TOYOTA Classic
  - Runners-up (1): 2012
- Digicel Pro Bowl
  - Winners (3): 2012, 2016, 2017.
  - Runners-up (1): 2008.
- Lucozade Sport Goal Shield
  - Runners-up (2): 2009, 2012
- Knockout Cup
  - Winners (2): 2023, 2024

=== International honours ===
- CONCACAF Champions' Cup
  - Winners (2): 1978, 1985
  - Runner-up (2): 1987, 1988
- Copa Interamericana
  - Runner-up (1): 1985
- CFU Club Championship
  - Winners (1): 2001

== Team management ==
- Head Coach: Kerry Jamerson
- Asst Coach: Ross Russell
- Technical Director: Hutson Charles

== Managerial history ==
- Hutson Charles (May 2003 – Sep 2004)
- Kerry Jamerson (Sep 2004 – April 2006)
- Anthony Barrington (April 2006– Nov 2006)
- Kerry Jamerson (Feb 2007– Dec 2008)
- Ross Russell (April 2009– Jan 2015)

== Performance in CONCACAF competitions ==
The following is a list of results for Defence Force F.C. in international competitions. Defence Force F.C.'s scores are listed first.

Year	Tournament	Round	Opponent	Home	Away	Agg.
1967	CONCACAF Champions' Cup	Group Stage	(Curaçao) Jong Colombia		1–1	
1967	CONCACAF Champions' Cup	Group Stage	(Haiti) Racing Haïtien		1–0	
1967	CONCACAF Champions' Cup	Group Stage	(Jamaica) Regiment		2–1	
1967	CONCACAF Champions' Cup	Group Stage	(Bermuda) Somerset Trojans		1–5	
1977	CONCACAF Champions' Cup	First Round	(Haiti) Violette	0–2	0–2	0–4
1978	CONCACAF Champions' Cup	First Round	(Guyana) Thomas United	1–0	3–2	4–2
1978	CONCACAF Champions' Cup	Second Round	(Suriname) Transvaal	3–1	1–1	4–2
1978	CONCACAF Champions' Cup	Third Round	(Suriname) Voorwaarts	2–0	2–1	4–1
1979	CONCACAF Champions' Cup	Second Round	(Curaçao) Jong Holland	0–0	2–0	2–0
1979	CONCACAF Champions' Cup	Third Round	(Curaçao) Jong Colombia	2–0	0–3	2–3
1980	CONCACAF Champions' Cup	Second Round	(Suriname) Robinhood	2–2	1–2	3–4
1981	CONCACAF Champions' Cup	First Round	(Suriname) Transvaal	2–2	0–1	2–3
1982	CONCACAF Champions' Cup	Second Round	(Curaçao) SUBT	2–0	0–1	2–1
1982	CONCACAF Champions' Cup	Third Round	(Suriname) Robinhood	1–1	2–5	3–6
1983	CONCACAF Champions' Cup	First Round	(Suriname) Robinhood	0–1	1–2	1–3
1985	CONCACAF Champions' Cup	Second Round	(Collectivity of Saint Martin) JS Capesterre	1–0	1–0	2–0
1985	CONCACAF Champions' Cup	Third Round	(Guadeloupe) Moulien			w/o ^{†}
1985	CONCACAF Champions' Cup	Final Round	(French Guiana) Montjoly			w/o ^{†}
1985	CONCACAF Champions' Cup	Final	(Honduras) Olimpia	2–0	0–1	2–1
1987	CONCACAF Champions' Cup	Second Round	(Martinique) Club Franciscain	4–2		4–2
1987	CONCACAF Champions' Cup	Final Round	(Trinidad and Tobago) Trintoc	2–1	1–1	3–2
1987	CONCACAF Champions' Cup	Final	(Mexico) América	1–1	0–2	1–3
1988	CONCACAF Champions' Cup	First Round	(Martinique) Club Franciscain	2–0	2–2	4–2
1988	CONCACAF Champions' Cup	Second Round	(Saint Vincent and the Grenadines) Cardinals	1–0	0–0	1–0
1988	CONCACAF Champions' Cup	Semi-finals	(Suriname) Robinhood		0–1	3–2
1988	CONCACAF Champions' Cup	Semi-finals	(Suriname) Robinhood		3–1	3–2
1988	CONCACAF Champions' Cup	Final	(Honduras) Olimpia		0–2	0–4
1988	CONCACAF Champions' Cup	Final	(Honduras) Olimpia		0–2	0–4
1989	CONCACAF Champions' Cup	Group Stage	(Curaçao) Jong Colombia		2–0	
1989	CONCACAF Champions' Cup	Group Stage	(Cuba) Pinar del Río		0–1	
1989	CONCACAF Champions' Cup	Group Stage	(Bonaire) Juventus		0–0	
1989	CONCACAF Champions' Cup	Group Stage	(Trinidad and Tobago) Trintoc		1–0	
1991	CONCACAF Champions' Cup	First Round	(Suriname) Robinhood	3–1	0–1	3–2
1991	CONCACAF Champions' Cup	Second Round	(Cayman Islands) Scholars International	1–0	6–0	7–0
1991	CONCACAF Champions' Cup	Third Round	(Trinidad and Tobago) Police	1–0	1–3	2–3
2001	CFU Club Championship	First Round	(Saint Lucia) Rovers United	6–1	3–0	9–1
2001	CFU Club Championship	Second Round	(Haiti) Roulado	5–1		
2001	CFU Club Championship	Second Round	(Suriname) SNL	3–1		
2001	CFU Club Championship	Third Round	(Trinidad and Tobago) W Connection	Cancelled		
2002	CONCACAF Champions' Cup	First Round	(Mexico) Pachuca	0–4	0–1	0–5
2011	CFU Club Championship	Elimination Stage 1	(Bermuda) Dandy Town Hornets	3–0	1–1	4–1
2011	CFU Club Championship	Elimination Stage 2	(Guyana) Milerock	3–0	4–0	7–0
2011	CFU Club Championship	Semi-finals	(Haiti) Tempête		0–0	
2011	CFU Club Championship	Third Place Match	(Guyana) Alpha United		1–1	
2014	CFU Club Championship	First Round	(Guyana) Alpha United		0–2	
2014	CFU Club Championship	First Round	(Jamaica) Harbour View		2–0	
2023	CONCACAF Caribbean Cup	Group Stage	(Jamaica) Cavalier	1–1		
2023	CONCACAF Caribbean Cup	Group Stage	(Martinique) Golden Lion		1–0	
2023	CONCACAF Caribbean Cup	Group Stage	(Trinidad and Tobago) Port of Spain		1–1	
2023	CONCACAF Caribbean Cup	Group Stage	(Dominican Republic) Moca	0–2		
2024	CFU Club Shield	Round of 16	(Dominican Republic) Atlético Pantoja		0–1	
2025	CONCACAF Caribbean Cup	Group Stage	(Haiti) Juventus des Cayes	1–0		
2025	CONCACAF Caribbean Cup	Group Stage	(Jamaica) Cavalier		1–2	
2025	CONCACAF Caribbean Cup	Group Stage	(Barbados) Weymouth Wales	1–1		
2025	CONCACAF Caribbean Cup	Group Stage	(Dominican Republic) Cibao		2–0	
2025	CONCACAF Caribbean Cup	Semi-finals	(Jamaica) Mount Pleasant	1–5	1–0	2–5
2025	CONCACAF Caribbean Cup	Third Place Play-off	(Dominican Republic) Cibao	3–0	1–2	4–2
2026	CONCACAF Champions Cup	Round One	(United States) Philadelphia Union	0–5	0–7	0–12
2026	CONCACAF Caribbean Cup	Group Stage	(Haiti) Violette		0–3	
2026	CONCACAF Caribbean Cup	Group Stage	(Suriname) Broki	2–1		
2026	CONCACAF Caribbean Cup	Group Stage	(Trinidad and Tobago) Club Sando	0–2		
2026	CONCACAF Caribbean Cup	Group Stage	(Dominican Republic) Delfines del Este		1–3	

- † Results of these matches are unknown

=== Record by opponent ===
Team	Pld	W	D	L	GF	GA	GD	WPCT
(Guyana) Alpha United	2	0	1	1	1	3	−2	0.00
(Mexico) América	2	0	1	1	1	3	−2	0.00
(Dominican Republic) Atlético Pantoja	1	0	0	1	0	1	−1	0.00
(Suriname) Broki	1	1	0	0	2	1	+1	100.00
(Jamaica) Cavalier	2	0	1	1	2	3	−1	0.00
(Dominican Republic) Cibao	3	2	0	1	6	2	+4	66.67
(Curaçao) Jong Colombia	4	2	1	1	5	4	+1	50.00
(Saint Vincent and the Grenadines) Cardinals	2	1	1	0	1	0	+1	50.00
(Trinidad and Tobago) Club Sando	1	0	0	1	0	2	−2	0.00
(Dominican Republic) Delfines del Este	1	0	0	1	1	3	−2	0.00
(Bermuda) Dandy Town Hornets	2	1	1	0	4	1	+3	50.00
(Martinique) Club Franciscain	3	2	1	0	8	4	+4	66.67
(Martinique) Golden Lion	1	1	0	0	1	0	+1	100.00
(Jamaica) Harbour View	2	1	1	0	2	0	+2	50.00
(Curaçao) Jong Holland	2	1	1	0	2	1	+1	50.00
(Haiti) Juventus des Cayes	1	1	0	0	1	0	+1	100.00
(Jamaica) Regiment	1	1	0	0	2	1	+1	100.00
(Collectivity of Saint Martin) JS Capesterre	2	2	0	0	2	0	+2	100.00
(Bonaire) Juventus	1	0	1	0	0	0	0	0.00
(Guyana) Milerock	2	2	0	0	7	0	+7	100.00
(Dominican Republic) Moca	1	0	0	1	0	2	−2	0.00
(Jamaica) Mount Pleasant	2	1	0	1	2	5	−3	50.00
(Honduras) Olimpia	4	1	0	3	2	5	−3	25.00
(Mexico) Pachuca	2	0	0	2	0	5	−5	0.00
(United States) Philadelphia Union	2	0	0	2	0	12	−12	0.00
(Trinidad and Tobago) Police	2	1	0	1	2	3	−1	50.00
(Trinidad and Tobago) Port of Spain	1	0	1	0	1	1	0	0.00
(Cuba) Pinar del Río	1	0	0	1	0	1	−1	0.00
(Haiti) Racing Haïtien	1	1	0	0	1	0	+1	100.00
(Suriname) Robinhood	10	2	2	6	13	17	−4	20.00
(Haiti) Roulado	1	1	0	0	5	1	+4	100.00
(Saint Lucia) Rovers United	2	2	0	0	9	1	+8	100.00
(Cayman Islands) Scholars International	2	2	0	0	7	0	+7	100.00
(Suriname) SNL	1	1	0	0	3	1	+2	100.00
(Curaçao) SUBT	2	1	0	1	2	1	+1	50.00
(Suriname) Voorwaarts	2	2	0	0	4	1	+3	100.00
(Haiti) Tempête	1	0	1	0	0	0	0	0.00
(Guyana) Thomas United	2	2	0	0	4	2	+2	100.00
(Suriname) Transvaal	4	1	2	1	6	5	+1	25.00
(Bermuda) Somerset Trojans	1	0	0	1	1	5	−4	0.00
(Trinidad and Tobago) United Petrotrin	3	2	1	0	4	2	+2	66.67
(Haiti) Violette	3	0	0	3	0	7	−7	0.00
(Barbados) Weymouth Wales	1	0	1	0	1	1	0	0.00
Total	87	38	18	31	115	107	+8	43.68

Source: Results

== See also ==
- Police F.C. (Trinidad and Tobago)
- WASA F.C.
- Prison Service F.C.
