= Police F.C. (Trinidad and Tobago) =

Police
- Full name: Police Football Club
- Founded: 1975; 51 years ago
- Ground: Police Barracks Ground; Saint James, Trinidad and Tobago
- League: TT Premier Football League
- 2025–26: TTPFL, 4th
| Home colours | Away colours |

Police Football Club, also referred to as Reboot Miscellaneous Police Football Club for sponsorship reasons, is a professional football club from Trinidad and Tobago, founded in 1975. The club represents the Trinidad and Tobago Police Service.

== History ==
Police are based in Saint James and play at Police Barracks Ground. They were founded in 1975 as a way for police officers to be able to play football too. They are currently a member of the TT Premier Football League, the professional Trinidadian league and the top division in the Trinidad and Tobago football league system.

The club was a finalist of the 1991 CONCACAF Champions' Cup, but lost to the Mexican Liga MX club Puebla 4–2 on aggregate. This was the last appearance of a Caribbean club at the Champions Cup final.

In 2024, they represented Trinidad and Tobago at the 2024 CONCACAF Caribbean Cup.

== Personnel ==
Police F.C.'s personnel includes serving police officers as well as civilians. All of the club's board are serving members of the Trinidad and Tobago Police Service. In their early years, Police and Defence Force that could offer guaranteed employment to their players but due to professionalism in the country, most of Police's players have to manage their shifts and playing. This can lead to occasions where players and coaches missing training and matches for operational reasons.

In 2024, there was a controversy which led to the head coach, Sergeant Richard Hood being sacked. The Trinidad and Tobago Police Sports Club had elected a new board led by Inspector Andrew Boodoo, whom offered Hood the position of technical director in exchange for stepping down. Hood declined the offer but was sacked as head coach as a result.

== See also ==
- WASA F.C.
- Prison Service F.C.
- Defence Force F.C.
