= AC Port of Spain =

- Full name: Athletic Club of Port of Spain
- Nickname: AC POS
- Founded: 2002; 24 years ago
- Ground: Hasely Crawford Stadium, Trinidad and Tobago
- Capacity: 23,000
- Chairman: Ryan Nunes
- Manager: TBA
- League: TT Premier Football League
- 2025–26: TTPFL, 5th

Athletic Club of Port of Spain (previously known as North East Stars FC) is a Trinidad and Tobago professional football club based in Port of Spain, Trinidad, that plays in the TT Premier Football League. The team plays its home games at the Hasely Crawford Stadium.

== History ==
The team joined the Professional Football League as North East Stars F.C. beginning in the 2002 season, having previously played in Trinidad's ECFU league. The team joined the league with the explicit intention of representing the north-east of Trinidad, previously underrepresented in football circles.

The team was terrible in their first season, finishing last in the league with a dismal record of 4 wins, 2 ties, and 22 losses. They improved dramatically in 2003, however, jumping from last to third, as they went 19–7–10. They improved even further in 2004, surprising everyone by winning the league with a dominant 14–5–2 performance. They finished 5th in 2005.

The club's Jerren Nixon finished the 2004 season as the league's leading scorer with a staggering 31 goals, 17 in front of second place Randolph Jerome's 14.

In 2020, the club moved to Port of Spain and changed its name.

== Club honours ==
=== League honours ===
- TT Premier Football League
  - Champions (3): 2004, 2017, 2023–24
  - Big Six Winners (1): 2004

=== Cups and trophies ===
- FA Trophy
  - Winners (1): 2003
  - Runners-up (2): 2006, 2010–11
- First Citizens Cup
  - Runners-up (2): 2006, 2014
- TOYOTA Classic
  - Winners (1): 2012
  - Runners-up (1): 2010
- Lucozade Sport Goal Shield
  - Winners (1): 2010

== Team management ==
- Owner and President: Ryan Nunes
- Technical Director:TBA
- Manager: TBA
- Head coach: TBA
- Goal keeper coach: TBA
- Assistant coach:TBA
- Equipment manager: TBA
- Physio therapist/ Trainer: TBA
