= 2009 Trinidad and Tobago Pro Bowl =

2009 Digicel Pro Bowl
Trinidad and Tobago Pro Bowl

Tournament details
- Country: Trinidad and Tobago
- Teams: 10

Final positions
- Champions: Joe Public
- Runners-up: Caledonia AIA

Tournament statistics
- Matches played: 9
- Goals scored: 29 (3.22 per match)
- Top goal scorer(s): Kerry Baptiste; Hayden Tinto (4 goals)

The 2009 Trinidad and Tobago Pro Bowl was the sixth season of the Digicel Pro Bowl, which is a knockout tournament competition for teams in the TT Pro League. The football tournament took place at the conclusion of the 2009 season. Caledonia AIA entered as the tournament's defending champion. The tournament commenced on 17 November 2009 with 10 teams competing in single elimination matches and concluded with the final on 11 December.

== Qualification ==
Every team based on the island of Trinidad took part in the tournament, with Tobago United as the lone Pro League representative that did not participate. Seeding for this year's competition was determined by each team's league position following the 2009 season. The bottom four teams in the table, United Petrotrin, FC South End, St. Ann's Rangers, and Police entered the tournament in the qualifying round.

The two winning teams from the qualifying round will take on the top two seeds Joe Public and Caledonia AIA, respectively. The other four clubs that qualified for the Pro League Big Six also entered the Pro Bowl directly in the quarterfinals.

== Schedule ==
The schedule for the 2009 Digicel Pro Bowl, as announced by the TT Pro League:

Round	Date	Matches	Clubs	New entries this round
Qualifying round	17 November 2009	2	10 → 8	4: 7th–10th
Quarterfinals	20 November 2009	4	8 → 4	6: 1st–6th
Semifinals	4 December 2009	2	4 → 2	
Final	11 December 2009	1	2 → 1	

^{†}The winner will also receive an additional prize amount based on gate receipts from each match.

== Bracket ==
Qualifying round 17 November 2009
7	United Petrotrin	1
10	Police	2
8	FC South End	0
9	St. Ann's Rangers	1

Quarterfinals; 20 November 2009
1	Joe Public	9
10	Police	1
4	W Connection	0
5	Ma Pau	3
3	San Juan Jabloteh	1
6	Defence Force	2
2	Caledonia AIA	5
9	St. Ann's Rangers	0

Semifinals; 4 December 2009
1	Joe Public	1
5	Ma Pau	0
6	Defence Force	0
2	Caledonia AIA	1

Final; 11 December 2009
1	Joe Public	1 (5)
2	Caledonia AIA	1 (3)

== Results ==
All matches were played for 90 minutes duration, at the end of which if the match was still tied, penalty-kicks were used to determine the match winner.

=== Qualifying round ===
On 17 November, St. Ann's Rangers pulled an upset over FC South End 1–0 with Josimar Belgrave providing the lone goal. In the other qualifying round match, Police also stunned United Petrotrin 2–1 to complete the teams in the quarterfinals.

17 November 2009	United Petrotrin	1–2	Police	Marabella, Trinidad
17:00 (UTC-4)	Augustus 19'		Harris 29'; Peltier 66'	Stadium: Manny Ramjohn Stadium

17 November 2009	FC South End	0–1	St. Ann's Rangers	Marabella, Trinidad
19:00 (UTC-4)			Belgrave 10'	Stadium: Manny Ramjohn Stadium

=== Quarterfinals ===
In the quarterfinals on 20 November, Joe Public used four goals from 2009 Golden Boot winner, Kerry Baptiste, to a 9–1 win against Police. Ma Pau joined the Eastern Lions in the semifinals, with a win over W Connection at Manny Ramjohn Stadium. On the other side of the bracket, Caledonia AIA defeated St. Ann's Rangers by a score 5–0 following a hat-trick from Kendall Velox, while Defence Force provided the closest match in the round with their win over San Juan Jabloteh 2–1.

20 November 2009	Joe Public	9–1	Police	Marabella, Trinidad
18:00 (UTC-4)	Tinto 11', 81', 83'; Power 26'; Baptiste 44', 56', 76', 80'; Rochford 63'	Report	Jones 76'	Stadium: Manny Ramjohn Stadium

20 November 2009	W Connection	0–3	Ma Pau	Marabella, Trinidad
20:00 (UTC-4)		Report	Caesar 60'; Samuel 79', 89'	Stadium: Manny Ramjohn Stadium

20 November 2009	San Juan Jabloteh	1–2	Defence Force	Malabar, Trinidad
20:00 (UTC-4)	Sam 52'	Report	Balthazar 29'; Jorsling 58'	Stadium: Larry Gomes Stadium

20 November 2009	Caledonia AIA	5–0	St. Ann's Rangers	Malabar, Trinidad
18:00 (UTC-4)	Velox 15', 56', 65'; David 36'; Moore 86'	Report		Stadium: Larry Gomes Stadium

=== Semifinals ===
On 4 December, Joe Public and Caledonia AIA both registered 1–0 victories in the semifinals to advance to the final. The Eastern Lions used a Hayden Tinto goal in the thirteenth minute to upend Ma Pau. However, Caledonia AIA needed an 81st minute free kick from winger Kareem Joseph to defeat Defence Force.

4 December 2009	Joe Public	1–0	Ma Pau	Mucurapo, Trinidad
20:00 (UTC-4)	Tinto 13'			Stadium: Hasely Crawford Stadium

4 December 2009	Caledonia AIA	1–0	Defence Force	Mucurapo, Trinidad
18:00 (UTC-4)	Joseph 81'			Stadium: Hasely Crawford Stadium; Referee: Gordon Maloney

=== Final ===
In the final, Joe Public came from behind to earn a draw 1–1 in regulation time before Colombian goalkeeper Alejandro Figueroa saved a Caledonia AIA's Keon Daniel penalty kick to give Joe Public a 5–3 win from the penalty spot.

11 December 2009	Joe Public	1–1 (5–3 p)	Caledonia AIA	Mucurapo, Trinidad
20:00 (UTC-4)	Highley 35'	Report	Theobald 3'	Stadium: Hasely Crawford Stadium; Referee: Gregory Hospidales
	Penalties
	Baptiste (penalty scored); Noel (penalty scored); Smith (penalty scored); Mitchell (penalty scored); Power (penalty scored)		Daniel (penalty missed); Joseph (penalty scored); David (penalty scored); Joseph (penalty scored)
