= 2008 Trinidad and Tobago Pro Bowl =

2008 Courts Pro Bowl
Trinidad and Tobago Pro Bowl

Tournament details
- Country: Trinidad and Tobago
- Teams: 10

Final positions
- Champions: Caledonia AIA
- Runners-up: Defence Force

Tournament statistics
- Matches played: 9
- Goals scored: 20 (2.22 per match)
- Top goal scorer: Oscar Torijano (2 goals)

The 2008 Trinidad and Tobago Pro Bowl was the fifth season of the Courts Pro Bowl, which is a knockout tournament competition for teams in the TT Pro League. W Connection entered as the tournament's defending champion. The tournament commenced on 6 May, with 10 teams competing in single elimination matches and concluded on 23 May, with Caledonia AIA defeating Defence Force 2–0 to claim the title.

== Qualification ==
Every club from the TT Pro League automatically qualified for the competition. Seeding was determined by the league standings following the fourth match day of the 2008 season. Teams ranked seventh to tenth were placed directly into the qualifying round which determined the seventh and eight spots in the quarterfinals.

The automatic quarterfinal qualifiers in order of league position were: Caledonia AIA, W Connection, San Juan Jabloteh, United Petrotrin, Joe Public, and Defence Force.

== Schedule ==
The schedule for the 2008 Courts Pro Bowl, as announced by the TT Pro League:

Round	Date	Matches	Clubs	New entries this round
Qualifying round	6 May 2008	2	10 → 8	4: 7th–10th
Quarterfinals	9 May 2008	4	8 → 4	6: 1st–6th
Semifinals	16 May 2008	2	4 → 2	
Final	23 May 2008	1	2 → 1	

== Bracket ==
Qualifying round 6 May 2008
7	St. Ann's Rangers	3
10	Tobago United	1
8	North East Stars	1
9	Ma Pau	0

Quarterfinals; 9 May 2008
1	Caledonia AIA	3
7	St. Ann's Rangers	1
4	United Petrotrin	1
5	Joe Public	0
3	San Juan Jabloteh	1 (4)
6	Defence Force	1 (5)
2	W Connection	4
8	North East Stars	0

Semifinals; 16 May 2008
1	Caledonia AIA	0 (4)
4	United Petrotrin	0 (2)
6	Defence Force	2
2	W Connection	0

Final; 23 May 2008
1	Caledonia AIA	2
6	Defence Force	0

== Results ==
All matches were played for 90 minutes duration, at the end of which if the match was still tied, penalty-kicks were used to determine the match winner.

=== Qualifying round ===
In the qualifying round, St. Ann's Rangers defeated Tobago United 3–1, whereas North East Stars upended Ma Pau 1–0 to advance to the quarterfinals.

6 May 2008	St. Ann's Rangers	3–1	Tobago United	Malabar, Trinidad
17:00 (UTC-4)	Thomas 8'; Belgrave 44'; Clarence 47'	Report	Hercules 35'	Stadium: Larry Gomes Stadium

6 May 2008	North East Stars	1–0	Ma Pau	Malabar, Trinidad
19:00 (UTC-4)	Wolfe 65'	Report		Stadium: Larry Gomes Stadium

=== Quarterfinals ===
Caledonia AIA and W Connection met little resistance from St. Ann's Rangers and North East Stars respectively. However, Defence Force upset San Juan Jabloteh 5–4 on penalties after the match ended 1–1 in regulation. United Petrotrin advanced to the semifinals after they beat Joe Public with the lone goal from Beville Joseph.

13 May 2008	Caledonia AIA	3–1	St. Ann's Rangers	Malabar, Trinidad
18:00 (UTC-4)	Theobald 8'; Joseph 34'; Phillips 86'	Report	Edwards 48'	Stadium: Larry Gomes Stadium

9 May 2008	United Petrotrin	1–0	Joe Public	Marabella, Trinidad
20:00 (UTC-4)	Joseph 50'	Report		Stadium: Manny Ramjohn Stadium

13 May 2008	San Juan Jabloteh	1–1 (4–5 p)	Defence Force	Malabar, Trinidad
20:00 (UTC-4)	Byers 46'	Report	Jorsling 90+3'	Stadium: Larry Gomes Stadium
	Penalties
	Noel (penalty scored); Guerra (penalty scored); Jean (penalty scored); Gregory (penalty scored)		Jorsling (penalty scored); Pierre (penalty scored); Williams (penalty scored); Roy (penalty scored); Rivers (penalty scored)

9 May 2008	W Connection	4–0	North East Stars	Marabella, Trinidad
18:00 (UTC-4)	Leon 18'; Velasco-Torijano 42', 68'; Hector 85'	Report		Stadium: Manny Ramjohn Stadium

=== Semifinals ===
On 16 May, Caledonia AIA needed penalty kicks to defeat United Petrotrin 4–2. In addition, Defence Force continued their run through the competition with a 2–0 upset win over W Connection.

16 May 2008	Caledonia AIA	0–0 (4–2 p)	United Petrotrin	Marabella, Trinidad
20:30 (UTC-4)		Report		Stadium: Manny Ramjohn Stadium
	Penalties
	Jemmott (penalty scored); Codrington (penalty scored); Joseph (penalty scored); Theobald (penalty scored)		Daniel (penalty scored); Caseman (penalty scored)

16 May 2008	W Connection	0–2	Defence Force	Marabella, Trinidad
18:00 (UTC-4)		Report	Edwards 33'; Durity 60'	Stadium: Manny Ramjohn Stadium

=== Final ===
In the final on 23 May, Caledonia AIA claimed the title over Defence Force following a quick goal from Kendall Velox in the 6th minute and an own goal by Corey Rivers a minute before half-time. Using a double in W Connection's win over North East Stars, Oscar Velasco-Torijano was the tournament's leading goal scorer.

23 May 2008	Defence Force	0–2	Caledonia AIA	Marabella, Trinidad
19:00 (UTC-4)		Report	Velox 6'; Rivers 44' (o.g.)	Stadium: Manny Ramjohn Stadium
