= 2017 Trinidad and Tobago Pro Bowl =

2017 Digicel Pro Bowl
Trinidad and Tobago Pro Bowl

Tournament details
- Country: Trinidad and Tobago
- Teams: 10

Final positions
- Champions: Defence Force
- Runners-up: Central

Tournament statistics
- Matches played: 9
- Goals scored: 32 (3.56 per match)
- Top goal scorer: Johan Peltier 4 goals

The 2017 Trinidad and Tobago Pro Bowl was the thirteenth season of the Digicel Pro Bowl, which is a knockout football tournament for Trinidad and Tobago teams competing in the TT Pro League.Defence Force entered as the cup holders having defeated W Connection by a score of 2–1 in the 2016 final. Defence Force won the tournament by 5-3 on penalty kicks over Central after a 2-2 draw at the final whistle.

== Qualification ==
Based on league positions before the tournament.

=== Enter at quarterfinals ===
1st. Central
2nd. W Connection
3rd. San Juan Jabloteh
4th. Ma Pau Stars
5th. Club Sando
6th. Defence Force

=== Enter at Qualifiers ===
7th. Police
8th. St. Ann's Rangers
9th. Morvant Caledonia United
10th. Point Fortin Civic

== Results ==
=== Qualifiers ===
31 January 2017	Police (7)	9-0	Point Fortin Civic (10)	Port of Spain, Trinidad and Tobago
19:00 (UTC-4)	Belgrave 2', 16', 80'; Perry 44', 69'; Riley 50'; Alleyne 57'; Perry 90+'; Lewis 79'	Report		Stadium: Hasely Crawford Stadium

31 January 2017	St. Ann's Rangers (8)	0-0 (5-4 p)	Morvant Caledonia United (9)	Port of Spain, Trinidad and Tobago
21:00 (UTC-4)		Report		Stadium: Hasely Crawford Stadium
	Penalties
	Antoine (penalty scored); Modeste (penalty missed); Benny (penalty missed); Phillip (penalty scored); Bartholemew (penalty scored); Mc Lean (penalty scored); Donald (penalty scored)		Joseph (penalty scored); Bethelmy (penalty missed); Armstrong (penalty scored); Neptune (penalty missed); King (penalty scored); Thomas (penalty scored); Samuel (penalty missed)

=== Quarterfinals ===
8 February 2017 A	Central (1)	8-0	St. Ann's Rangers (8)	Couva, Trinidad and Tobago
18:00 (UTC-4)	de Silva 28' (pen.); Winchester 31', 52'; Peltier 40', 80', 83' (pen.), 88'; Cummings 68'	Report		Stadium: Ato Boldon Stadium

8 February 2017 B	W Connection (2)	1-1 (2-3 p)	Police (7)	Couva, Trinidad and Tobago
20:00 (UTC-4)	Hector 20'	Report	Thomas 86'	Stadium: Ato Boldon Stadium
	Penalties
	Hector (penalty missed); Goddard (penalty scored); Frederick (penalty missed); St. Prix (penalty scored); Williams (penalty missed)		Ryan (penalty missed); Caruth (penalty scored); Perry (penalty missed); Thomas (penalty scored); Alleyne (penalty scored)

9 February 2017 D	Ma Pau Stars (4)	0-2	Club Sando (5)	Couva, Trinidad and Tobago
18:00 (UTC-4)	Piper 63'; Humphrey 63'	Report		Stadium: Ato Boldon Stadium

9 February 2017 C	San Juan Jabloteh (3)	1-2	Defence Force (6)	Couva, Trinidad and Tobago
20:00 (UTC-4)	Reid 29' (pen.)	Report	Arcia 49', 52'	Stadium: Ato Boldon Stadium

=== Semifinals ===
12 February 2017 M	Central (1)	0-0 (5-4 p)	Club Sando (5)	Couva, Trinidad and Tobago
16:00 (UTC-4)		Report		Stadium: Ato Boldon Stadium
	Penalties
	Marcano (penalty missed); Mitchell (penalty scored); Paul (penalty scored); George (penalty scored); Winchester (penalty scored); Cummings (penalty missed); John (penalty missed); Williams (penalty scored)		Rivers (penalty scored); Cornwall (penalty scored); Humphrey (penalty scored); Stephens (penalty scored); Latapy (penalty missed); Piper (penalty missed); Russell (penalty missed); Holder (penalty missed)

12 February 2017 N	Police (7)	0-4	Defence Force (6)	Couva, Trinidad and Tobago
18:00 (UTC-4)		Report	Boatswain 61', 78', 84'; Arcia 68'	Stadium: Ato Boldon Stadium

=== Final ===
19 February 2017	Central (1)	2-2 (3-5 p)	Defence Force (6)	Couva, Trinidad and Tobago
18:00 (UTC-4)	Paul 57' (pen.); Mitchell 90'	Report	Garcia 6'; Boatswain 67'	Stadium: Ato Boldon Stadium
	Penalties
	Arcia (penalty scored); Gonzales (penalty scored); Garcia (penalty scored); Garcia (penalty scored); Jorsling (penalty scored)		Mitchell (penalty missed); Paul (penalty scored); George (penalty scored); James (penalty scored)
