= 2014 Trinidad and Tobago Pro Bowl =

2014 Digicel Pro Bowl
Trinidad and Tobago Pro Bowl

Tournament details
- Country: Trinidad and Tobago
- Teams: 9

Tournament statistics
- Matches played: 1
- Goals scored: 2 (2 per match)
- Top goal scorer(s): Neil Mitchell; Brent Sam (1 goal each)

The 2014 Trinidad and Tobago Pro Bowl is the tenth season of the Digicel Pro Bowl, which is a knockout football tournament for Trinidad and Tobago teams competing in the TT Pro League. For the fourth consecutive season, the Pro Bowl concluded the Pro League calendar. Additionally, for the third year the winner of the Pro Bowl was invited to compete in the Digicel Charity Shield to open the 2014–15 Pro League season. W Connection entered as the Pro Bowl holders, having defeated North East Stars 4–3 in a penalty shootout after the match ended in 0–0 in regulation during the 2013 final at Hasely Crawford Stadium. The competition commenced on 2 May with all nine Pro League teams competing in single elimination beginning with the qualifying round and concluded on 23 May with the final.

== Qualification ==
After the expansion of the TT Pro League back to nine teams competing during the 2013–14 season, the Pro Bowl re-introduced the qualifying round to determine the eighth team to enter the draw for the quarterfinals. The lowest two teams in the league table, San Juan Jabloteh and St. Ann's Rangers, were drawn into the qualifying round, which was held on 2 May 2014 at the Ato Boldon Stadium in Couva.

The random draw for the quarterfinals took place on 8 May at the Digicel corporate box in Queen's Park Oval in Port of Spain. W Connection entered the competition as the defending Pro Bowl winners and were drawn against Caledonia AIA in the later quarterfinal match-up at Hasely Crawford Stadium. The remaining quarterfinal match-ups resulted in the winner of the qualifying round to face Police in the first match at the Mucurapo venue. In the match-up of the round, re-admitted Pro League club Point Fortin Civic were drawn against 2012 Digicel Pro Bowl winners Defence Force in Couva. The final quarterfinal match, also held at the Ato Boldon Stadium, North East Stars will face recently crowned 2014 Lucozade Sport Goal Shield winners Central FC.

== Schedule ==
The schedule for the 2014 Digicel Pro Bowl, as announced by the TT Pro League:

Round	Date	Matches	Clubs	New entries this round
Qualifying round	2 May 2014	1	9 → 8	2: 8th–9th
Quarterfinals	9 May 2014	4	8 → 4	8: 1st–8th
Semifinals	16 May 2014	2	4 → 2	
Final	23 May 2014	1	2 → 1	

== Bracket ==
Qualifying round 2 May 2014
San Juan Jabloteh	2
St. Ann's Rangers	0

Quarterfinals; 9 May 2014
Police	4
San Juan Jabloteh	2
Point Fortin Civic	2 (3)
Defence Force	2 (4)
Caledonia AIA	1
W Connection	3
North East Stars	0
Central FC	3

Semifinals; 16 May 2014
Police	4
Defence Force	2
W Connection	1 (4)
Central FC	1 (2)

Final; 23 May 2014
Police
W Connection

== Results ==
All matches were played for 90 minutes duration, at the end of which if the match was still tied, penalty-kicks were used to determine the match winner.

=== Qualifying round ===
The Pro Bowl began with the qualifying round between the bottom two clubs, San Juan Jabloteh and St. Ann's Rangers, in the Pro League during the 2013–14 season. With two second-half goals from Brent Sam and Neil Mitchell, the San Juan Kings advanced to the quarterfinals with a 2–0 win.

2 May 2014	San Juan Jabloteh	2–0	St. Ann's Rangers	Couva, Trinidad
20:00 (UTC-4)	Sam 70'; Mitchell 84'	Report		Stadium: Ato Boldon Stadium
