= La Curacao =

La Curacao may refer to:

- Curacao (retail store), a U.S. retail store chain, formerly named La Curacao
- La Curacao, a Salvadoran retail chain in Central America owned by the Unicomer Group
