= 2013 Trinidad and Tobago Pro Bowl =

2013 Digicel Pro Bowl
Trinidad and Tobago Pro Bowl

Tournament details
- Country: Trinidad and Tobago
- Teams: 8

Final positions
- Champions: W Connection
- Runners-up: North East Stars

Tournament statistics
- Matches played: 7
- Goals scored: 17 (2.43 per match)
- Top goal scorer: Kevon Carter (3 goals)

The 2013 Trinidad and Tobago Pro Bowl was the ninth season of the Digicel Pro Bowl, which is a knockout football tournament for Trinidad and Tobago teams competing in the TT Pro League. For the third consecutive season, the Pro Bowl concluded the Pro League calendar. Additionally, for the second year the winner of the Pro Bowl was invited to compete in the Digicel Charity Shield to open the 2013–14 Pro League season. Defence Force entered as the Pro Bowl holders having defeated Caledonia AIA by a score of 5–2 in the 2012 final in Hasely Crawford Stadium. The competition commenced on 17 May with all eight Pro League teams competing in single elimination beginning in the quarterfinals and concluded on 29 May with the final.

== Qualification ==
For the second consecutive season, all eight teams competing in the TT Pro League entered the competition at the quarterfinal round. The draw for the quarterfinals took place on 15 May 2013 at the Digicel corporate box in Queen's Park Oval in Port of Spain. Defence Force entered the competition as the defending Pro Bowl winners and were the first to draw from eight secretly numbered cards respective to spots in the quarterfinal round.

Following the draw, quarterfinal match-ups resulted in Defence Force facing T&TEC who finished last following the Pro League season. In the later quarterfinal match-up saw North East Stars facing St. Ann's Rangers. However, the match-up of the round will contest Caledonia AIA and W Connection at Manny Ramjohn Stadium in Couva. The two clubs finished second and third, respectively, in the league table. The other quarterfinal match-up in Couva resulted Central FC facing Police.

== Schedule ==
The schedule for the 2013 Digicel Pro Bowl, as announced by the TT Pro League:

Round	Date	Matches	Clubs	New entries this round
Quarterfinals	17 May 2013	4	8 → 4	8: 1st–8th
Semifinals	24 May 2013	2	4 → 2	
Final	29 May 2013	1	2 → 1	

== Bracket ==
Quarterfinals; 17 May 2013
Defence Force	5
T&TEC	0
W Connection	3
Caledonia AIA	1
North East Stars	3
St. Ann's Rangers	0
Central FC	1
Police	0

Semifinals; 24 May 2013
Defence Force	1 (3)
W Connection	1 (4)
North East Stars	1 (5)
Central FC	1 (3)

Final; 29 May 2013
W Connection	0 (4)
North East Stars	0 (3)

== Results ==
All matches were played for 90 minutes duration, at the end of which if the match was still tied, penalty-kicks were used to determine the match winner.

=== Quarterfinals ===
In the quarterfinals on 17 May, Defence Force advanced to the semifinals with a win over T&TEC 5–0. The Teteron Boys scored all five goals in the second half and used a hat-trick from Kevon Carter. North East Stars recorded a clean sheet over St. Ann's Rangers with goals from Kennedy Hinkson, Marcus Gomez, and Kareem Moses. Peter Byers was the lone goal scorer in a 1–0 win for Central FC over Police. In the match-up of the round, W Connection ousted Caledonia AIA from the competition 3–1 at Ato Boldon Stadium in Couva.

17 May 2013	Defence Force	5–0	T&TEC	Mucurapo, Trinidad
18:00 (UTC-4)	Elcock 63'; Carter 68', 70', 83'; Russell Jr. 78'	Report		Stadium: Hasely Crawford Stadium

17 May 2013	Central FC	1–0	Police	Couva, Trinidad
18:00 (UTC-4)	Byers 61'	Report		Stadium: Ato Boldon Stadium

17 May 2013	North East Stars	3–0	St. Ann's Rangers	Mucurapo, Trinidad
20:00 (UTC-4)	Hinkson 27'; Gomez 45'; Moses 47'	Report		Stadium: Hasely Crawford Stadium

17 May 2013	W Connection	3–1	Caledonia AIA	Couva, Trinidad
20:00 (UTC-4)	Pacheco 9' (pen.); Benjamin 49'; Arcia 79'	Report	David 52'	Stadium: Ato Boldon Stadium; Referee: Gyasi McDonald

=== Semifinals ===
In the semifinals, on 24 May, W Connection upended the recently crowned Pro League champions Defence Force 4–3 in a penalty shoot-out after the match ended in a 1–1 draw. Andrei Pacheco scored his second goal in as many matches to give the Savonetta Boys a 1–0 lead in the eighth minute. However, the match remained level until a Devorn Jorsling goal in the 74th to send the match into penalties. Alejandro Figueroa saved two penalties from Richard Roy and Kevon Carter to give W Connection the victory and trip to the final. The other semifinal match would also need a penalty shoot-out to determine the winner. North East Stars used a 5–3 win on penalties to end Central FC's inaugural season. The Sangre Grande Boys claimed the lead in the 57th minute with a goal from Kennedy Hinkson. However, one minute later the Sharks equalised through Rundell Winchester. The match ended in a 1–1 draw and resulted in penalties. Cleon John denied Darren Mitchell in the third round of spot kicks to give North East Stars the win after the club successfully converted five consecutive penalties.

24 May 2013	Defence Force	1–1 (3–4 p)	W Connection	Macoya, Trinidad
18:00 (UTC-4)	Jorsling 74'	Report	Pacheco 8'	Stadium: Marvin Lee Stadium; Referee: Gordon Maloney
	Penalties
	Jorsling (penalty scored); Roy (penalty missed); Elcock (penalty scored); Gonzales (penalty scored); Carter (penalty missed)		Pacheco (penalty missed); Spann (penalty scored); J. Jones (penalty scored); A. Jones (penalty scored); Arcia (penalty scored)

24 May 2013	North East Stars	1–1 (5–3 p)	Central FC	Macoya, Trinidad
20:00 (UTC-4)	Hinkson 57'	Report	Winchester 58'	Stadium: Marvin Lee Stadium; Referee: Rodphin Harris
	Penalties
	Manners (penalty scored); John (penalty scored); Moses (penalty scored); Thomas (penalty scored); Hinkson (penalty scored)		Marcano (penalty scored); Mitchell (penalty missed); Oliver (penalty scored); Winchester (penalty scored)

=== Final ===
On 29 May, W Connection claimed their third Digicel Pro Bowl title following a 4–3 penalty shoot-out win over North East Stars after a scoreless draw. The Pro Bowl title was the Savonetta Boys third and first in six years. Colombian goalkeeper Alejandro Figueroa saved the first penalty in the shoot-out from Cornell Glen. However, Joevin Jones missed on his attempt to keep the shoot-out level. Afterwards, Elijah Manners and Kareem Moses converted for North East Stars, as well as Silvio Spann and Gerard Williams for W Connection. The momentum shifted after Elton John hit his penalty off the crossbar. After Hashim Arcia and Kennedy Hinkson scored their shots for W Connection and North East Stars respectively, W Connection captain and Saint Lucian international Elijah Joseph hit his penalty down the center past Cleon John to give the Savonetta Boys the win.

29 May 2013	W Connection	0–0 (4–3 p)	North East Stars	Mucurapo, Trinidad
20:00 (UTC-4)		Report		Stadium: Hasely Crawford Stadium; Referee: Neal Brizan
	Penalties
	J. Jones (penalty missed); Spann (penalty scored); G. Williams (penalty scored); Arcia (penalty scored); Joseph (penalty scored)		Glen (penalty missed); Manners (penalty scored); Moses (penalty scored); John (penalty missed); Hinkson (penalty scored)
