= Justin Garcia =

Trinidadian footballer (born 1995)

Personal information
- Full name: Justin Julian Garcia
- Date of birth: 26 October 1995 (age 31)
- Place of birth: Trinidad and Tobago
- Height: 1.84 m (6 ft 0 in)
- Position: Centre-back

Team information
- Current team: Song Lam Nghe An
- Number: 62

Senior career*
Years	Team	Apps	(Gls)
2016–2025	Defence Force		
2025–	Song Lam Nghe An	19	(3)

International career^{‡}
2019–	Trinidad and Tobago	39	(3)
- * Club domestic league appearances and goals as of 7 June 2026 ‡ National team caps and goals as of 12 November 2026

Justin Julian Garcia (born 26 October 1995) is a Trinidadian professional footballer who plays as a centre-back for V.League 1 club Song Lam Nghe An and the Trinidad and Tobago national team.

== Club career ==
In August 2025, Garcia moved to Vietnam, signing for V.League 1 club Song Lam Nghe An.

== International career ==
Garcia debuted for the Trinidad and Tobago national team in a friendly 1–0 loss to St. Vincent and the Grenadines on 11 August 2019. He was called up to represent Trinidad and Tobago at the 2021 CONCACAF Gold Cup.

== Honours ==
Defence Force

- Trinidad and Tobago Pro Bowl: 2017
- TT Pro League: 2019–20, 2023, 2024–25
- Knockout Cup: 2023, 2024

Individual

- TTPFL Player of the Year: 2023

== Statistics ==
=== International goals ===
Scores and results list Trinidad and Tobago goal tally first, score column indicates score after each Garcia goal

List of international goals scored by Justin Garcia
No.	Date	Venue	Opponent	Score	Result	Competition
1	10 September 2023	Estadio Jorge "El Mágico" González, San Salvador, El Salvador	El Salvador	3–2	3–2	2023–24 CONCACAF Nations League A
2	18 June 2025	Shell Energy Stadium, Houston, United States	Haiti	1–1	1–1	2025 CONCACAF Gold Cup
3	12 November 2026	Sir Vivian Richards Stadium, St. John's, Antigua and Barbuda	Antigua and Barbuda	3–1	align="center"|3–1	2026–27 CONCACAF Nations League
