= Trinidad and Tobago Pro Bowl =

Digicel Pro Bowl
- Founded: 2004
- Region: Trinidad and Tobago
- Teams: 10
- Current champions: Defence Force (2nd title)
- Most championships: W Connection (4 titles)
- Website: Digicel Pro Bowl
- 2017 Digicel Pro Bowl

The Trinidad and Tobago Pro Bowl, or commonly known as the Digicel Pro Bowl for sponsorship reasons, is a knockout football tournament for teams in the TT Pro League. The competition is played during May following the conclusion of the Pro League season. The Pro Bowl began without a sponsor during the competitions's first two years. It was not until 2006, when Courts began providing monetary prizes, that the tournament had its first sponsor. Following a pullout by Courts after three years, Digicel became the new branding partner of the competition. The prize money for the winner, as announced by TT Pro League CEO Dexter Skeene, is determined by the players, the clubs and the communities. With this programme the communities are expected to adopt the clubs and pledge their support to them during the tournament. The prize money will be the amount received from gate receipts and TT$100,000, courtesy of tournament sponsors Digicel.

Beginning in 2012, the winner of the previous year's Pro Bowl will open the following TT Pro League season in the Digicel Charity Shield against the defending Pro League champion. In the case that the league champion also wins the Pro Bowl, then the Charity Shield is contested by the top two teams in the previous league season.

W Connection is the most successful club in the Pro Bowl having claimed the title four times. In fact, the Savonetta Boys are the current holders of the Pro Bowl after defeating North East Stars 4–3 in a penalty shoot-out in 2013 after the match ended in a scoreless draw, and winning again in 2014.

== History ==
The tournament was dominated by San Juan Jabloteh and W Connection in its first four years. The Pro Bowl served as a continuance of the rivalry between the two clubs. Although the Savonetta Boys claimed the inaugural tournament in 2004 and winning again in 2007. The San Juan Kings secured the Pro Bowl title in consecutive seasons in 2005 and 2006 over their rivals. In 2008, Caledonia AIA became the first club besides San Juan Jabloteh or W Connection to claim the title. Joe Public became the second club in 2009 after defeating Caledonia AIA on penalty kicks. The Eastern Lions repeated as winners in 2011 before shortly afterwards withdrawing from the TT Pro League. The following year, Defence Force claimed their first Pro Bowl after a 5–2 win over Caledonia AIA in 2012.

== Format ==
The competition is open to all clubs in the TT Pro League and is divided into three rounds consisting of single-legged matches. During the first two years of the competition, eight and seven clubs, respectively, representing the Pro League entered the tournament. In 2006, with the expansion of the league to include ten teams, the Pro Bowl added the qualifying round to narrow the teams to eight before the quarterfinals. In 2009, the draw for the knockout tournament was based on club's finish in the 2009 season. The bottom four teams entered the tournament at the qualifying round and the top six teams were automatically entered the quarterfinals. However, with the contraction of the league to eight teams with the 2010–11 season, the qualifying round was eliminated and all eight teams now enter the competition in the quarterfinals. As of the 2017 tournament with ten teams in the TT Pro League, the four lowest teams in league position at the start of the tournament will enter a qualifying round, where the two winners will advance to the quarterfinals.

Matches in all rounds are single-legged played for 90 minutes duration, at the end of which if the match is still tied, a penalty shootout is used to determine the match winner.

== Sponsorship ==
The Pro Bowl has been sponsored since 2006. The sponsor has been able to determine the competition's sponsorship name. The list below details who the sponsors have been and what they called the competition:

Period	Sponsor	Name
2004–2005	No main sponsor	Pro Bowl
2006–2008	Courts (Furniture retailer)	Courts Pro Bowl
2009–2016	Digicel (Mobile phone network)	Digicel Pro Bowl

== Finals ==
=== Results ===
Key
*	Match decided in extra time
^{†}	Match decided by a penalty shootout after regulation time
^{‡}	Match decided by a penalty shootout after extra time

Season	Winner	Score	Runners–up	Venue
2004	W Connection	2–2^{†}	San Juan Jabloteh	
2005	San Juan Jabloteh	1–0	W Connection	Manny Ramjohn Stadium
2006	San Juan Jabloteh (2)	0–0^{†}	W Connection	Manny Ramjohn Stadium
2007	W Connection (2)	2–2^{†}	Superstar Rangers	Manny Ramjohn Stadium
2008	Caledonia AIA	2–0	Defence Force	Manny Ramjohn Stadium
2009	Joe Public	1–1^{†}	Caledonia AIA	Hasely Crawford Stadium
2011	Joe Public (2)	1–0	W Connection	Marvin Lee Stadium
2012	Defence Force	5–2	Caledonia AIA	Hasely Crawford Stadium
2013	W Connection (3)	0–0^{†}	North East Stars	Hasely Crawford Stadium
2014	W Connection (4)	3–0	Police	Hasely Crawford Stadium
2015	Central	4–1	Caledonia AIA	Hasely Crawford Stadium
2016	Defence Force (2)	2–1	W Connection	Hasely Crawford Stadium
2017	Defence Force (3)	2–2^{†}	Central	Hasely Crawford Stadium

== Results by team ==
Club	Wins	Last final won	Runners-up	Last final lost
W. Connection FC	4	2014	4	2016
Defence Force FC	3	2017	1	2008
San Juan Jabloteh FC	2	2006	1	2004
Joe Public FC	2	2011	0	
Caledonia AIA FC	1	2008	3	2015
Central FC	1	2015	1	2017
North East Stars FC	0		1	2013
Police FC	0		1	2014
Superstar Rangers FC	0		1	2007
