= Jamille Boatswain =

Trinidadian footballer (born 1993)

Personal information
- Date of birth: 30 September 1993 (age 33)
- Place of birth: Trinidad and Tobago
- Position: Forward

Team information
- Current team: Honduras Progreso

Senior career*
Years	Team	Apps	(Gls)
2014–2017	Point Fortin Civic	?	(25)
2017	Defence Force	?	(3)
2017–2018	Alajuelense	6	(1)
2018–	Honduras Progreso	0	(0)

International career^{‡}
2017–	Trinidad and Tobago	8	(3)
- * Club domestic league appearances and goals as of 01:33, 31 January 2018 (UTC) ‡ National team caps and goals as of 22 November 2017

Jamille Boatswain (born 30 September 1993) is a Trinidian footballer who plays as a striker for Honduran side Honduras Progreso and the Trinidad and Tobago national team.

== International career ==
Boatswain made his international debut on 10 March 2017 in a friendly against Barbados. After coming on as a 33rd-minute substitute, he scored twice before being subbed off himself in the 62nd minute. According to FIFA rules, because he came on as a substitute but did not finish the match he was not credited with a cap. Therefore, after the match his international statistics were officially two goals in zero caps.

=== International goals ===
Scores and results list Trinidad and Tobago's goal tally first.

No	Date	Venue	Opponent	Score	Result	Competition
1.	10 March 2017	Ato Boldon Stadium, Couva, Trinidad and Tobago	Barbados	1–0	2–0	Friendly
2.	10 March 2017	Ato Boldon Stadium, Couva, Trinidad and Tobago	Barbados	2–0	2–0	Friendly
3.	12 November 2017	Ato Boldon Stadium, Couva, Trinidad and Tobago	Grenada	1–2	2–2	Friendly
