= Kennedy Hinkson =

Grenadian footballer

Personal information
- Full name: Kennedy Hinkson
- Date of birth: 21 February 1986 (age 40)
- Place of birth: Port of Spain, Trinidad & Tobago
- Height: 1.65 m (5 ft 5 in)
- Position: Midfielder

Team information
- Current team: La Horquetta Rangers

Senior career*
| Years | Team | Apps | (Gls) |
| 2005–2009 | United Petrotrin | | |
| 2010–2011 | San Juan Jabloteh | | (1) |
| 2013–2015 | North East Stars | | (8) |
| 2015–2017 | San Juan Jabloteh | | (5) |
| 2018 | W Connection | | (1) |
| 2019–? | La Horquetta Rangers | | |

International career
| 2017–2019 | Grenada | 11 | (1) |
- * Club domestic league appearances and goals

Kennedy Hinkson (born 21 February 1986), is a professional football player who is last known to have played for La Horquetta Rangers of Trinidad and Tobago, and representing the Grenadian national team. He was called up and debuted internationally on 16 November 2018 during the qualifiers of the CONCACAF Nations League, scoring his first national goal for Grenada in a 5–2 victory against non-FIFA member Saint Martin.

== International career ==
=== International goals ===
Scores and results list Grenada's goal tally first.

| No. | Date | Venue | Opponent | Score | Result | Competition |
|---|---|---|---|---|---|---|
| 1. | 16 November 2018 | Kirani James Athletic Stadium, St. George's, Grenada | Saint Martin | 3–0 | 5–2 | 2019–20 CONCACAF Nations League qualification |
