= Hayden Tinto =

Trinidad and Tobago footballer

Personal information
- Full name: Hayden Tinto
- Date of birth: 31 August 1985 (age 41)
- Place of birth: Port of Spain, Trinidad and Tobago
- Height: 5 ft 11 in (1.80 m)
- Position: Midfielder

Team information
- Current team: Joe Public
- Number: 7

Senior career*
| Years | Team | Apps | (Gls) |
| 2005 | Maraval Youth Academy | | |
| 2006–2008 | Caledonia AIA | ? | (12) |
| 2009– | Joe Public | ? | (3) |

International career^{‡}
| 2007– | Trinidad and Tobago | 15 | (2) |
- * Club domestic league appearances and goals as of 08:18, 15 June 2009 (UTC) ‡ National team caps and goals as of 13 August 2009

Hayden Tinto (born 31 August 1985) is a Trinidad and Tobago footballer.

== Career ==
Tinto began his career with Caledonia AIA and joined in 2009 to league rival Joe Public.

=== Attributes ===
He has achieved wide acclaim for his skill and is sometimes called from Fans the "Caribbean Maradona."

== International career ==
Tinto scored the first international goal for the Trinidad and Tobago national team in Azteca Stadium.

== Music career ==
He is also a trained classical violinist and has poured thousands of his own dollars into the "Hayden Tinto Academy of Fiddling" in downtown Port of Spain to provide poor young Trinidadians opportunities to learn to play stringed instruments.
