= Silvio Spann =

Trinidad and Tobago footballer (born 1981)

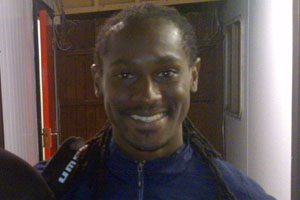

Personal information
- Full name: Silvio Reinaldo Spann
- Date of birth: 21 August 1981 (age 45)
- Place of birth: Couva, Trinidad and Tobago
- Height: 1.75 m (5 ft 9 in)
- Position: Midfielder

Senior career*
| Years | Team | Apps | (Gls) |
| 2000 | Doc's Khelwalaas | ? | (?) |
| 2001 | W Connection | ? | (?) |
| 2001–2002 | Perugia | 0 | (0) |
| 2002 | Sambenedettese | 35 | (30) |
| 2002–2004 | W Connection | ?? | (?) |
| 2004–2005 | Dinamo Zagreb | 0 | (0) |
| 2005 | Yokohama FC | 20 | (3) |
| 2006–2007 | W Connection | ? | (?) |
| 2007–2010 | Wrexham | 50 | (1) |
| 2010–2015 | W Connection | ? | (?) |

International career^{‡}
| 2002–2009 | Trinidad and Tobago | 41 | (2) |
- * Club domestic league appearances and goals as of 12:33, 21 February 2010 (UTC) ‡ National team caps and goals as of 27 January 2010

Silvio Spann (born 21 August 1981) is a former Trinidad and Tobagonian footballer who played professionally in countries including Italy, Japan, Croatia and Wales.

Spann is a midfielder. He is the son of Leroy Spann, also former Trinidad and Tobago national team player.

== Club career ==
Spann has played in Italy, for Perugia and Sambenedettese. His move to Japan occurred after he failed to get a work permit in England, where Derby County and Crystal Palace were both interested in him.

Spann's contract with Japanese club Yokohama FC finished just before the 2006 World Cup, forcing him to return home where he re-signed for W Connection.

It was announced in July 2007 that Spann would be attending a two-week trial with Sunderland. He also spent time on trial at Sheffield United.

Spann later went on to sign a 3-year contract with Wrexham who play their football in the Football League Two after international teammates, and former Wrexham players, Carlos Edwards and Dennis Lawrence gave the club a glowing report. Silvio has been granted the number 16 shirt at Wrexham. He scored his first goal for the club in a 2–1 league defeat to Notts County, a game in which he later got sent off. He was transfer listed by Wrexham in May 2008 following the club's relegation to the Football Conference. Despite being transfer listed, he remained with the club until he was released at the end of the 2009–10 season.

== International career ==
Spann made his international debut against Barbados in July 2002. Spann had been named in the Trinidad and Tobago national team for the 2006 FIFA World Cup in Germany, but had to drop out after sustaining a hamstring injury in the run-up to the tournament.

On 7 June 2007, in the Gold Cup Tournament at the Home Depot Center, Spann scored a spectacular free kick more than 40 meters out against El Salvador, Trinidad & Tobago were defeated 2–1.

== Club statistics ==
| Club performance | | | League | | Cup | | Total | |
| Season | Club | League | Apps | Goals | Apps | Goals | Apps | Goals |
| Trinidad and Tobago | | | League | | Trinidad and Tobago Cup | | Total | |
|---|---|---|---|---|---|---|---|---|
| 2000 | Doc's Khelwalaas | Pro League | | | | | | |
| 2001 | W Connection | Pro League | | | | | | |
| Italy | | | League | | Coppa Italia | | Total | |
| 2001/02 | Perugia | Serie A | 0 | 0 | | | 0 | 0 |
| 2002/03 | Sambenedettese | Serie C1 | 3 | 0 | | | 3 | 0 |
| Trinidad and Tobago | | | League | | Trinidad and Tobago Cup | | Total | |
| 2003 | W Connection | Pro League | | | | | | |
| 2004 | W Connection | Pro League | | | | | | |
| Croatia | | | League | | Croatian Cup | | Total | |
| 2004/05 | Dinamo Zagreb | Prva HNL | 0 | 0 | | | 0 | 0 |
| Japan | | | League | | Emperor's Cup | | Total | |
| 2005 | Yokohama FC | J2 League | 20 | 3 | 0 | 0 | 20 | 3 |
| Trinidad and Tobago | | | League | | Trinidad and Tobago Cup | | Total | |
| 2006 | W Connection | Pro League | | | | | | |
| 2007 | W Connection | Pro League | | | | | | |
| England | | | League | | FA Cup | | Total | |
| 2007/08 | Wrexham | League Two | 9 | 1 | 1 | 0 | 10 | 1 |
| 2008/09 | Wrexham | Conference | 13 | 0 | 2 | 0 | 15 | 0 |
| 2009/10 | Wrexham | Conference | | | | | | |
| Country | Trinidad and Tobago | | | | | | | |
| Country | Italy | | 3 | 0 | | | 3 | 0 |
| Country | Croatia | | 0 | 0 | | | 0 | 0 |
| Country | Japan | | 20 | 3 | 0 | 0 | 20 | 3 |
| Country | England | | 22 | 1 | 3 | 0 | 25 | 1 |
| Total | | | 45 | 4 | 3 | 0 | 48 | 4 |

== National team statistics ==
Trinidad and Tobago national team
| Year | Apps | Goals |
|---|---|---|
| 2002 | 3 | 0 |
| 2003 | 7 | 0 |
| 2004 | 8 | 1 |
| 2005 | 9 | 0 |
| 2006 | 2 | 0 |
| 2007 | 5 | 1 |
| 2008 | 1 | 0 |
| 2009 | 6 | 0 |
| Total | 41 | 2 |

=== International goals ===
Scores and results list T&T's goal tally first.

| # | Date | Venue | Opponent | Score | Result | Competition |
|---|---|---|---|---|---|---|
| 1 | 12 December 2004 | Tortola, British Virgin Islands | British Virgin Islands | 4–0 | 4–0 | Digicel Caribbean Cup 2005 |
| 2 | 7 June 2007 | California, United States | El Salvador | 1–0 | 1–2 | 2007 CONCACAF Gold Cup |

== Personal life ==
His younger brother Silas Spann of Joe Public F.C. is currently member of the Trinidad and Tobago national football team.
