= Unicomer Group =

Private finance group in El Salvador

Unicomer Caribbean Holding Co. Ltd
- Type: Private
- Industry: Retail
- Founded: 2000; 26 years ago
- Headquarters: San Salvador, El Salvador
- Area served: Central America, Caribbean Islands, United States, South America
- Products: Appliances, furniture, video and audio products, computers/tablets/smartphones, optical products, motorcycles and a variety of technological accessories
- Brands: Courts; RadioShack
- Number of employees: +15,000
- Website: https://www.unicomergroup.com

Unicomer Caribbean Holding Co. Ltd (Spanish: Grupo Unicomer), is a multinational retailing and consumer finance group headquartered in San Salvador, El Salvador, with regional offices in Miami, Trinidad, Jamaica, and Costa Rica. It operates several chains of retail brands in the consumer durables sector, specializing in furniture, audio & video, appliances, and electronics in Central America, the Caribbean, South America, and United States.

== History ==
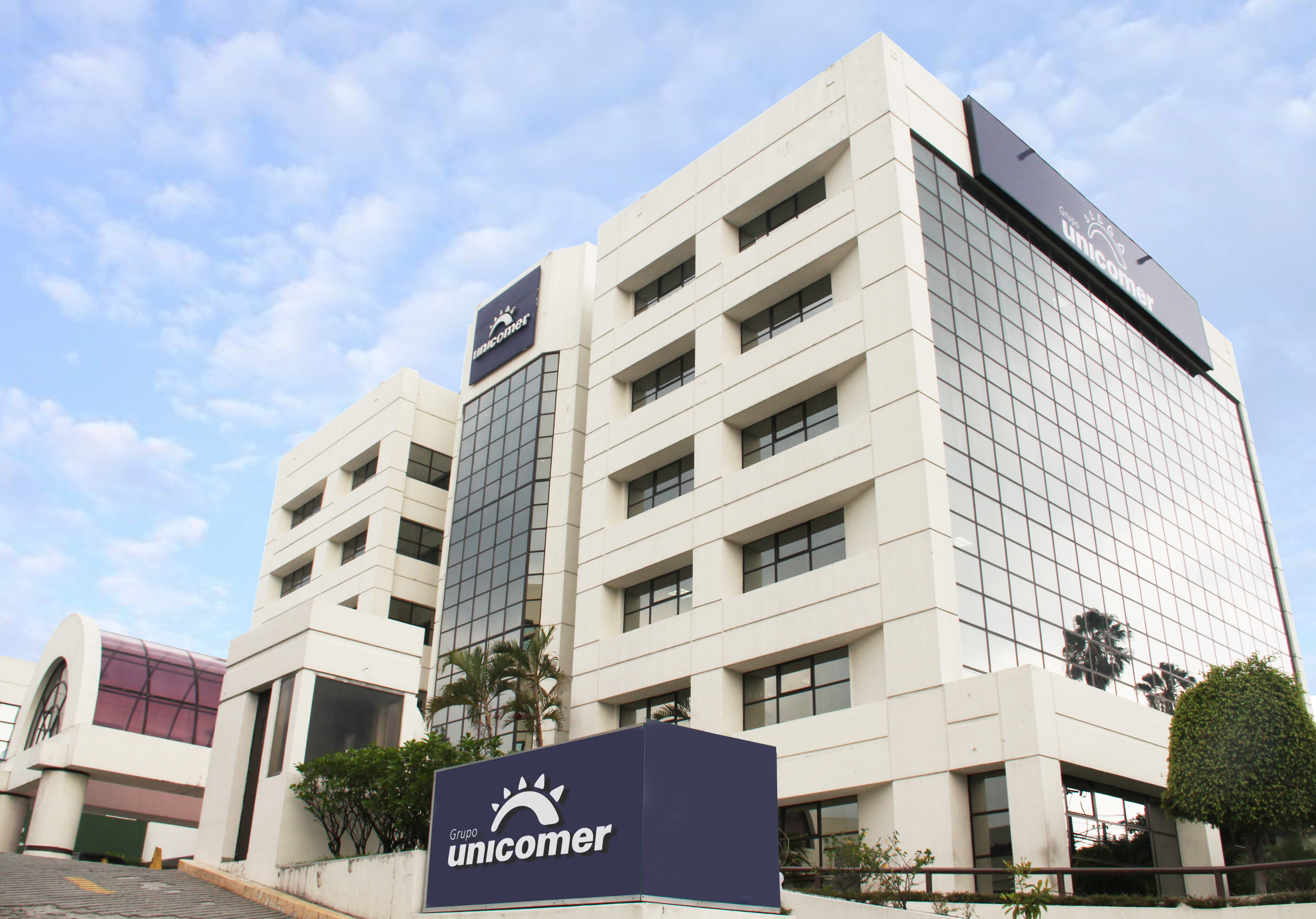
Unicomer Group Headquarters in San Salvador, El Salvador.

The Unicomer Group was founded in 2000.

In 2014, Unicomer Group obtained international credit ratings from Fitch Ratings and from Standard and Poors for its consolidated holding company, which at that time was named Regal Forest Holding Co. Ltd.

15 April 2015, Unicomer Group acquired the exclusive rights to the RadioShack brands, intellectual property and contracts of existing RadioShack franchisees throughout Central America, South America and the Caribbean.

In February 2017, the Group's holding company changed its name to Grupo Unicomer Holding Co. Ltd.

In March 2017, Unicomer Group issued a 144A/RegS international bond in an amount of US$350 Million for a term of 7 years that was listed on the SGX Singapore Exchange.

Later 2017, Latin Finance Magazine awarded Unicomer Group with the Best Capital Markets Strategy Award for the Central America and Caribbean region.

In December 2021, Unicomer Group's international credit ratings were BB−.

In May 2022, Unicomer Group signed an agreement to purchase CrediScotia Financiera, a Peruvian financial services company owned by Bank of Nova Scotia of Canada. This acquisition is pending regulatory approvals.

Since 2000, Unicomer Group is operating more than 30 brands with over 1,000 stores in 26 countries in Central America, South America, the Caribbean islands and USA, employing over 13,000 associates.

Unicomer Group publishes annually its Corporate Responsibility and Sustainability Report (ESG).

== Brands operated by Unicomer Group ==
Brand	Presence (Country/Region)
La Curaçao	El Salvador, Guatemala, Nicaragua, Honduras, Costa Rica, Dominican Republic
Gollo	Costa Rica
Artefacta	Ecuador
Almacenes Tropigas	El Salvador, Guatemala, Nicaragua, Honduras, Belize
Loco Luis	El Salvador, Guatemala, Nicaragua, Honduras
Optica La Curaçao	El Salvador, Guatemala, Nicaragua, Honduras
Gollo Opticas	Costa Rica
Servitotal	El Salvador, Guatemala, Nicaragua, Honduras, Costa Rica, Dominican Republic
Electro Facil	Paraguay
Baratodo	Ecuador
TropiMotors	El Salvador, Guatemala, Nicaragua, Honduras, Ecuador
AKT	Nicaragua
Courts	Jamaica, Barbados, Trinidad & Tobago, Guyana, St. Lucia, Dominica, Grenada, Antigua & Barbuda, St. Kitts & Nevis, St. Vincent & the Grenadines, Belize
Lucky Dollar	Jamaica, Trinidad & Tobago
Unicomer USA	United States (Houston)
Courts Caribbean	United States (New York City)
Servitech	Jamaica, Barbados, Trinidad & Tobago, St. Lucia, Dominica, Grenada, Antigua & Barbuda, St. Kitts & Nevis, St. Vincent & the Grenadines, Belize
Ashley Furniture HomeStore	Jamaica, Trinidad & Tobago
Omni	Curaçao, Bonaire, St. Maarten
AMC Unicon	Aruba
Hagemyer	Aruba
Home & Nature	Aruba
Price Hacker	Aruba
RadioShack Franchise	Central America, South America, Caribbean
lacuracaonline.com	E-commerce
gollotienda.com	E-commerce
shopcourts.com	E-commerce

== La Curacao ==
The Central American retail chain La Curaçao was established in 1890 under the name Curaçao Trading Company which dedicated to maritime ports exploitation.

By 1911, it was acquired by the Dutch Curaçao Trading Company (CETECO) renovating into selling household and agricultural products.

In 1945, it consolidated into the household appliance store as of today.

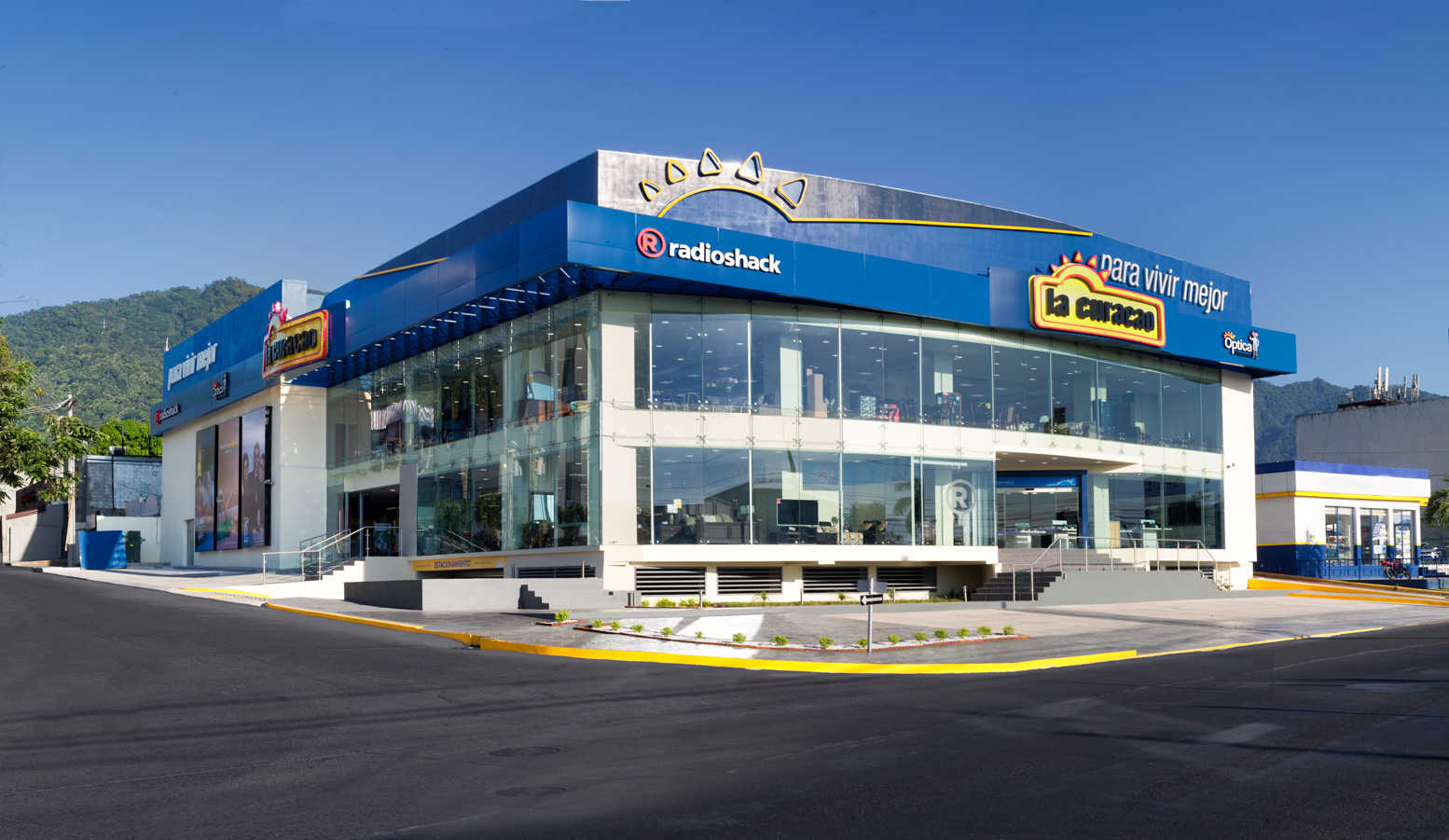
La Curaçao store located in Calle Circunvalación, San Pedro Sula, Honduras. The re inauguration of this store marked the 1,000th store milestone for Unicomer Group.

In 2000, the Unicomer Group was formed when it acquired the Dutch multinational CETECO's retail operations in Central America, including the chains La Curaçao and Almacenes Tropigas.

Operations were strengthened by the acquisition in countries like Guatemala, El Salvador, Honduras, Nicaragua and later in the Dominican Republic. In 2004, the Unicomer Group opened two stores under the name of UNICOMER in Houston, Texas, in the United States.

In October 2005, La Curaçao expands its services introducing Opticas La Curaçao in Guatemala, selling ophthalmological products. Opticas La Curaçao supplies lenses and frames for eye- and sunglasses, as well as ocular medical consultations using advanced diagnostic equipment.

In February 2006, Opticas La Curaçao is introduced in El Salvador and later in Nicaragua in October of the same year, and later Honduras.

La Curaçao opened its e-commerce website in 2003.

La Curaçao also opened a concept store named La Curaçao Cash, providing preferential customers cash loans to be repaid in instalments. This concept begins in Guatemala in 2013 and is now present in Honduras totaling 15 cash stores. Later on, the cash loans concept was added in the normal La Curacao stores. They also provide instant credit, delivery, warranties, and maintenance service for products.

As of 2017, La Curaçao branched out to more than 200 stores.

== Courts ==
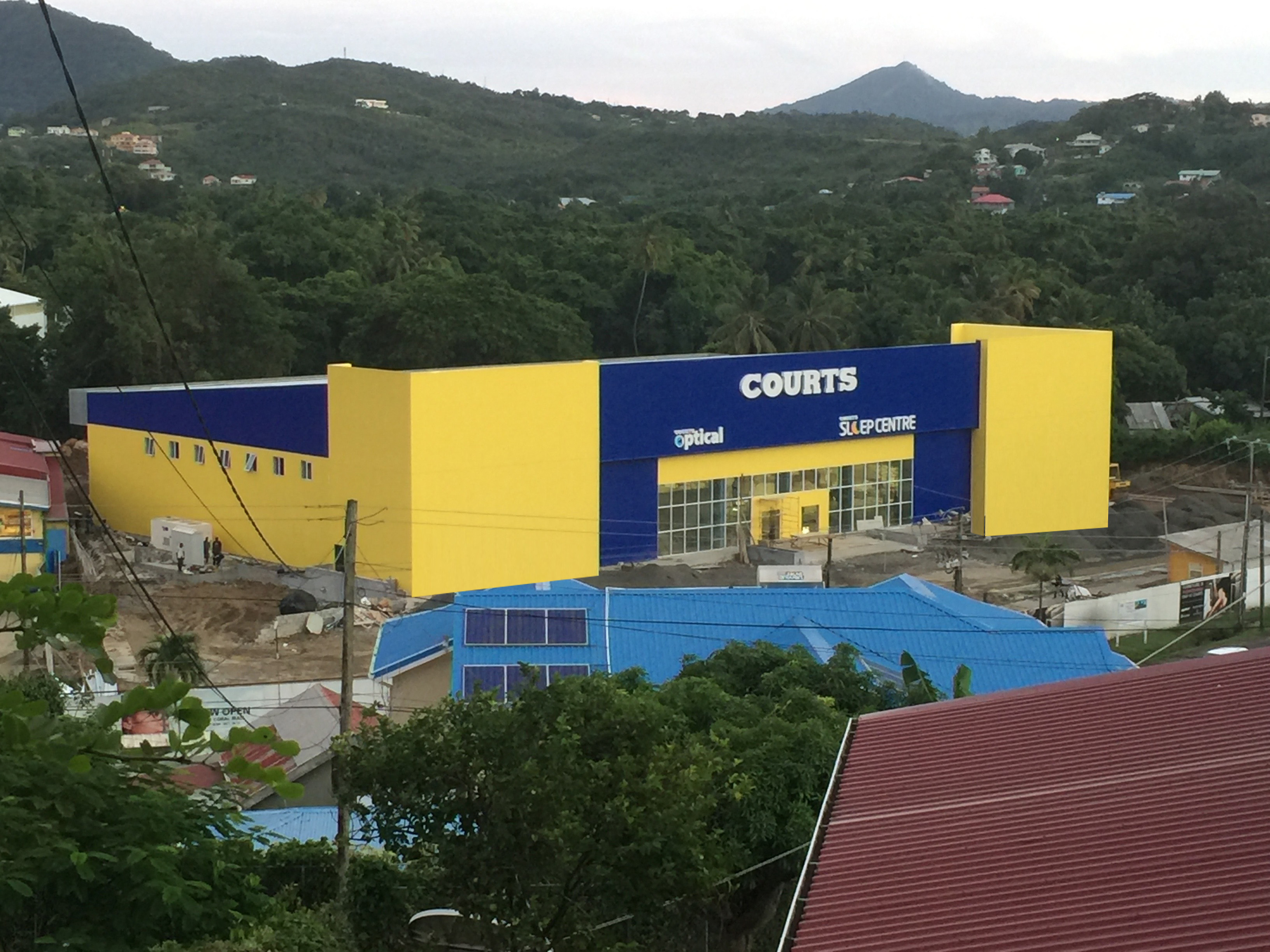
Courts mega store in Marisule, Saint Lucia

Courts was founded in 1850 with one store in England.

The company was established in the Caribbean region since 1959, and is the Caribbean's largest furniture, appliance and electrical retailer. The company has stores across the Caribbean islands: Antigua and Barbuda, Barbados, Belize, Dominica, Grenada, Jamaica, St. Kitts and Nevis, St. Vincent and the Grenadines, St. Lucia, Trinidad & Tobago, and also on the South American continent in Guyana. Courts also has a retail presence in other former British territories in Asia and Africa.

In December 2006, Unicomer Group acquired the Courts operations in the Caribbean. In the process, Unicomer Group realized the first-ever leveraged buyout (LBO) in the Caribbean region by acquiring the publicly traded shares of Courts in Jamaica and Barbados, and by acquiring the remaining operations directly from the holding company, Courts plc, in the UK.

In 2008, Unicomer Group opened its first Courts Caribbean store in Brooklyn, New York City, US.

In 2011 Unicomer Group expanded its US services by opening a store in Queens, catering principally to the Caribbean immigrant communities in the area.

In 2012, just as its sister store La Curaçao, synergy between regions led Courts to open its optical branch, Courts Optical.

In 2014, Courts opens its e-commerce website, providing products in the Caribbean and those living outside of the Caribbean wishing to send products back home.

== Gollo ==
Gollo store in San Ramon, Alajuela, Costa Rica

Gollo was founded in 1974 in Costa Rica with four employees, operates in retailing technology, furniture and home appliances in the Costa Rican market.

In 2000, Gollo introduced its mascot with the same name.

In 2005, the slogan "Solo Bueno" was introduced.

In 2012, Gollo was acquired by Unicomer Group.

In February 2014, Gollo launches its e-commerce site.

In 2014 also, Gollo Optical is launched providing lenses and frames for eye and sunglasses, ocular medical consultations with technology just as its sister stores, La Curaçao and Courts.

Today the store chain comprises more than 120 stores with more than 700,000 square feet area and 1,600 employees.

== Artefacta ==
Founded in 1989 with Peruvian investments, Artefacta began as an electrical goods assembly plant under de name ETELSA. A few years in, the company took a more commercial operation opening two stores in Ecuador: one in Quito and one in Guayaquil.

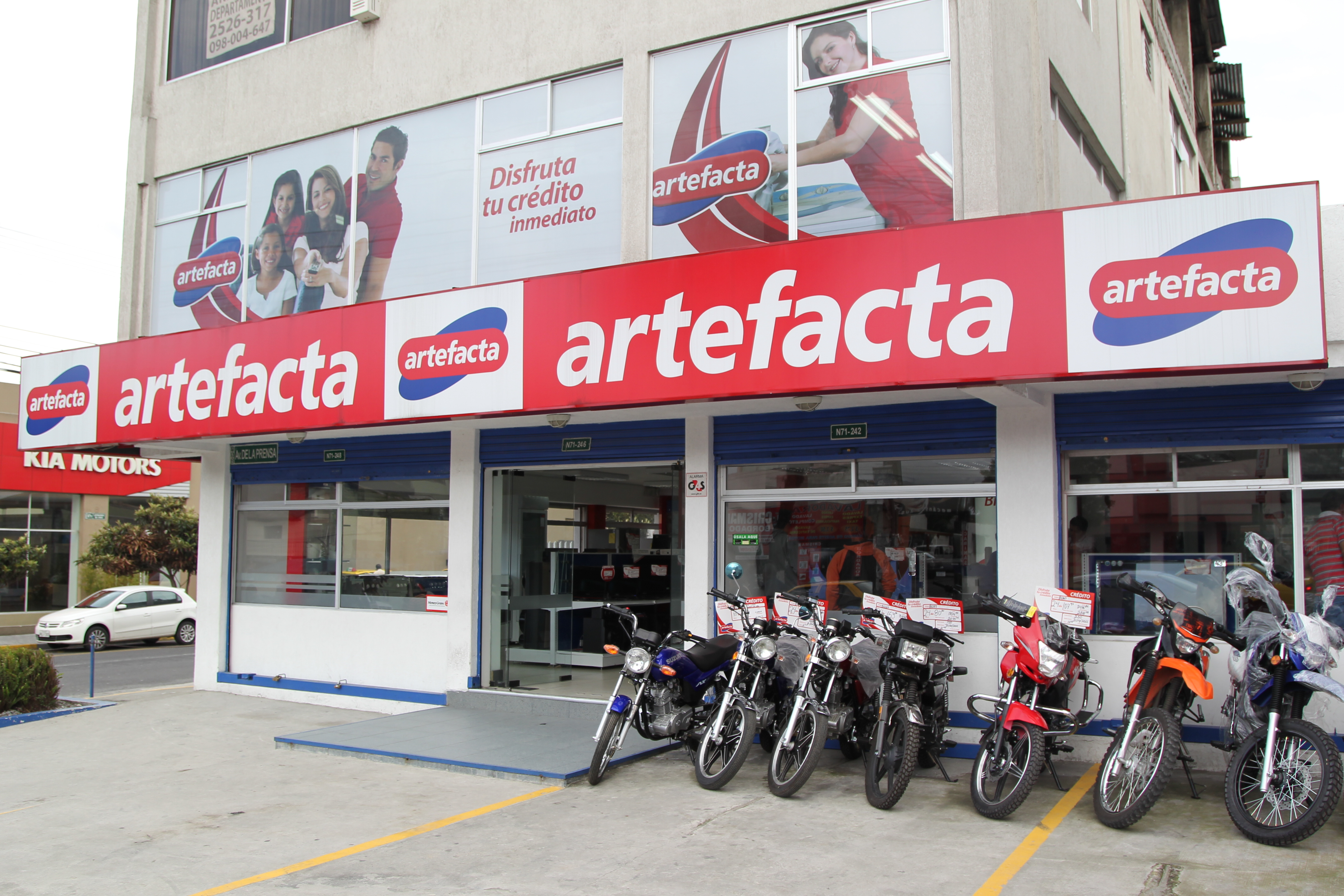
Artefacta store in El Condado, Quito, Ecuador

Following this, the company changed its name to Artefacta.

In 2002, Artefacta decided to extend its product line to motorcycles and cellular phones, making it one of the first chains that opened a different sales channel for these products.

In 2004, Artefacta began selling desktops and laptops, which has been one of the fastest growing lines of the company.

In 2008, Artefacta changed its advertising concept strategy, adopting the image "Family of appliances", incorporated into all the advertising of the company.

In 2009, Artefacta was the first store in Ecuador to venture into mass insurance market, providing insurance packages for life, accident and unemployment.

At the end of 2011, Unicomer Group acquired Artefacta with its 98 stores.

== Almacenes Tropigas ==
Tropigas began a liquified gas company in 1955. It soon attended the demand for small appliances and home goods and began commercializing these.

In 1988, the gas section of the company was acquired by Shell International and by 1992, the Dutch business group CETECO acquired the household appliance section, separating the retail business into Almacenes Tropigas.

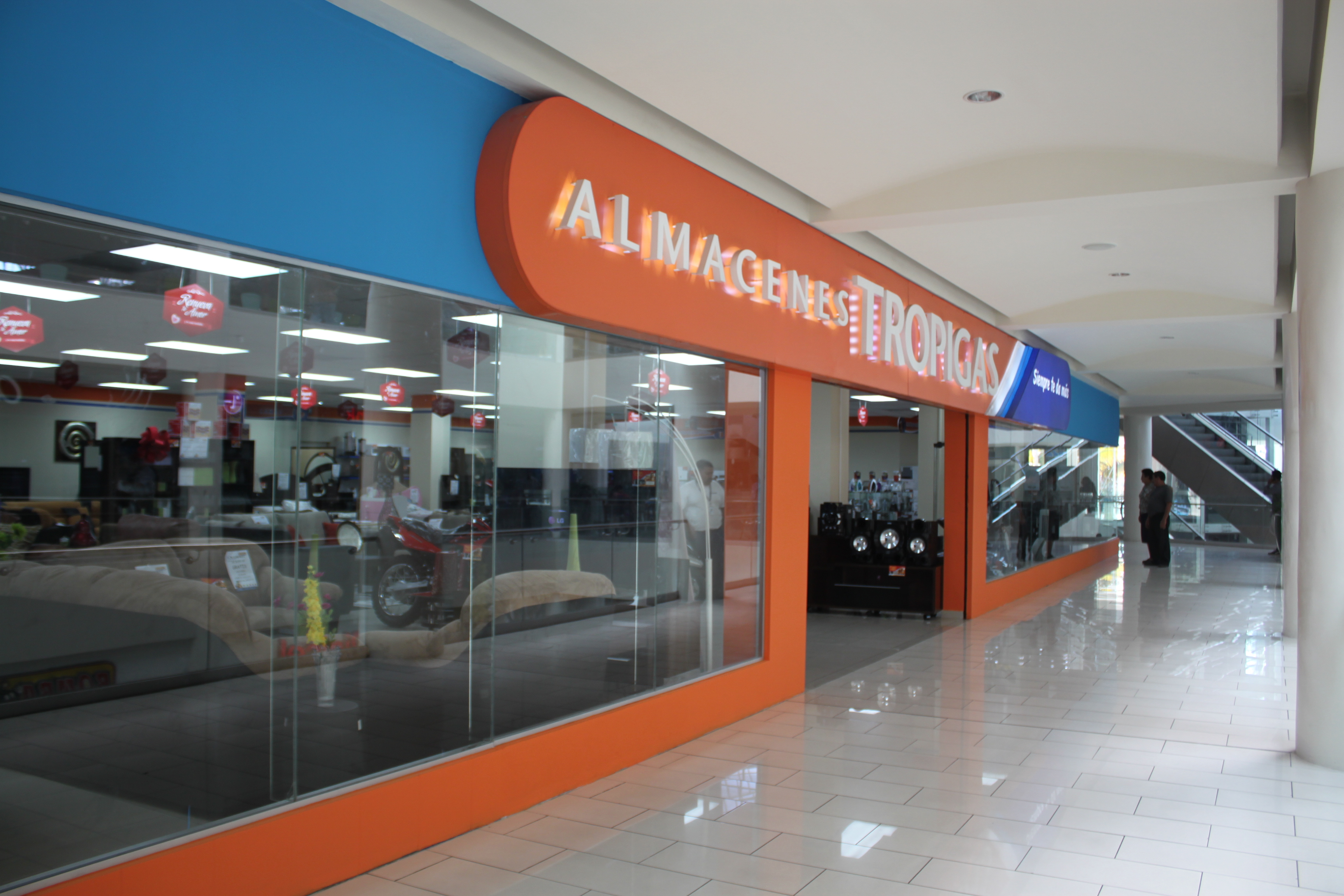
Almacenes Tropigas store in Metrocentro mall, San Salvador, El Salvador

Almacenes Tropigas, backed up by La Curaçao, carried out strategies allowing them to cover a larger share of the market, positioning itself as second in the electric appliance market.

In 2000, Unicomer Group bought the CETECO group. At that time, Almacenes Tropigas had reached a significant portion in the Central American region.

Early 2001, Almacenes Tropigas implemented the door-to-door sales system, starting in El Salvador and rolling out to the rest of the Central American countries in October of the same year.

In 2007, Almacenes Tropigas started operations in Belize.

In 2015, it reaches a total of 130 stores distributed through El Salvador, Honduras, Guatemala, Nicaragua, and Belize. Like its sister chain La Curaçao, TropiCash was launched, providing cash loans with installments.

== RadioShack franchise ==
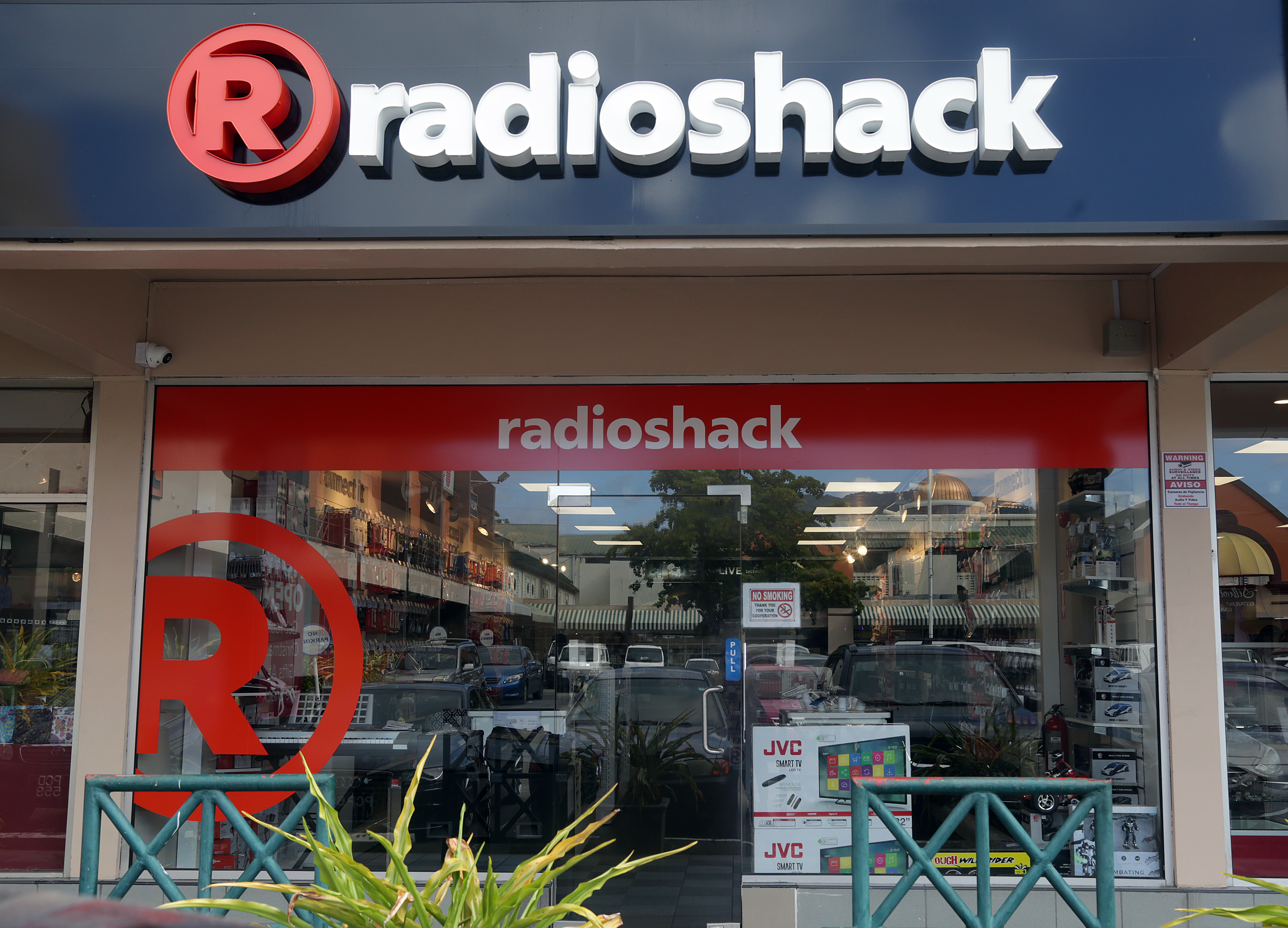
Unicomer Group owned RadioShack store in Valpark, Trinidad & Tobago

In January 1998, Unicomer Group's shareholders initially acquired a RadioShack franchise in El Salvador.

In 2002, the brand's expansion outside the Salvadoran territory began in Honduras.

In 2003, operations began in Guatemala.

In May 2005, operations began in Nicaragua.

By January 2015, Unicomer Group owned 57 RadioShack stores distributed throughout the Central American region, making it one of the largest independent owners of RadioShack stores in the world.

Since 2000, Unicomer Group has become a franchise operator for RadioShack. The brand gained position in the region and has created thousands of jobs for Central American families that rely on its brand and deferred payment facilities.

Unicomer Group received awards Diamond Excellence Award, Platinum Plus Award, Best RadioShack Store Growth Award, and Best Advertising Program.

On 15 April 2015, Unicomer Group acquired the exclusivity rights from the US Bankruptcy court for the RadioShack brands, intellectual property and contracts of existing RadioShack franchise throughout Central America, South America and the Caribbean. In the new territories, RadioShack is present through 198 franchise stores, with Unicomer Group as franchisor. This has allowed Unicomer Group to have an indirect retail presence in countries where it was not yet present, such as Peru, Bolivia, and Haiti.
