= Malabar Settlement =

Malabar
- Neighborhoods of Arima
- Interactive map of Malabar
- Coordinates: 10°37′N 61°17′W
- Country: Trinidad and Tobago
- Historic County: Saint George
- Borough: Arima
- Named for: Malabar Coast of India
- Postal code: 350462
- Area code: +1 (868)-667

Malabar is a diverse neighbourhood in South Arima, in Trinidad and Tobago. It is noted for middle class housing. Its boundaries are marked by Omeara Road to the west, Tumpuna Road to the east, the Churchill-Roosevelt Highway to the south and Pro Queen Street to the north. One of its main streets, Subero Street extends southward into Malabar from Pro Queen Street into the Malabar housing project and ends at Nutones Boulevard, which runs along the northern boundary of the O'meara Industrial Estate. The other main street is the Malabar Road. The western part of Malabar seems to overlap with what was once the La Chance estate (Verification required), which was founded by Gaston de Gannes de La Chancellerie in the 1840s. The La Chance estate house is located on O'Meara Rd and currently houses the Acoté veterinary clinic.

Until the early 1970s, southern Malabar was primarily populated by the descendants of indentured Malayali, Tamil (Madrasi), and Kannadiga Malabar Indians from the Malabar region on the southwestern coast of India. The southern part of the original settlement along Malabar Road was known locally as India.

Malabar is a heavily residential area, with small to medium - size businesses distributed along its main thoroughfares. These businesses are in the main shops, food vendors and small service establishments such as tyre shops, laundries etc. The late 1960s and 1970s saw the establishment of a number of residential areas by private developers in the district. these were:

Christina Gardens, Malabar Gardens (often confused with the government housing project), Leotaud Lands, Sierra Vista, and Concorde Gardens

And, in the late 1990s:

Filly Gardens

In the late 1960s the Trinidad and Tobago government commenced the construction of the Malabar housing project. This continued into the 1980s. The Trinidad and Tobago government's Malabar housing project is currently divided into four Phases, numbered in order of establishment:

1. Phase 1, whose streets are named after decorative and ornamental plant species, such as Banyan Boulevard, Salvia Drive, Allamanda Avenue, and Poui Lane. The Malabar Government Primary School is located in this Phase.
2. Phase 2, whose streets are named after popular steelbands, such as Despers Crescent and Nutones Boulevard.
3. Phase 3, whose streets are named after birds, such as Falcon Crescent and Cornbird Crescent
4. Phase 4, whose streets are named after prominent Arimian citizens such as Roland Cleveland, Eustace Draper and Gloria McLean

Up to the late 1960s southern Malabar, currently the housing project, was covered by light forest and was known for large number of guava trees that grew there. Caimans, tortoises, green parrots, parakeets and various fish such as guppy (Poecilia reticulata), cascarob (a type of cichlid) and guabin (hoplias malabiricus) were quite common in the area but have virtually disappeared with the removal of the native forests. Green Iguanas (Iguana iguana), Opossums (of the order Didelphimorphia) and mongooses(Herpestidae) currently co - exist with the district's human residents.

A sports facility Larry Gomes Stadium is located in Malabar. The Malabar settlement has a community centre, and a judicial complex has been proposed.
