= Courts (retailer) =

Furniture and electronics retailer

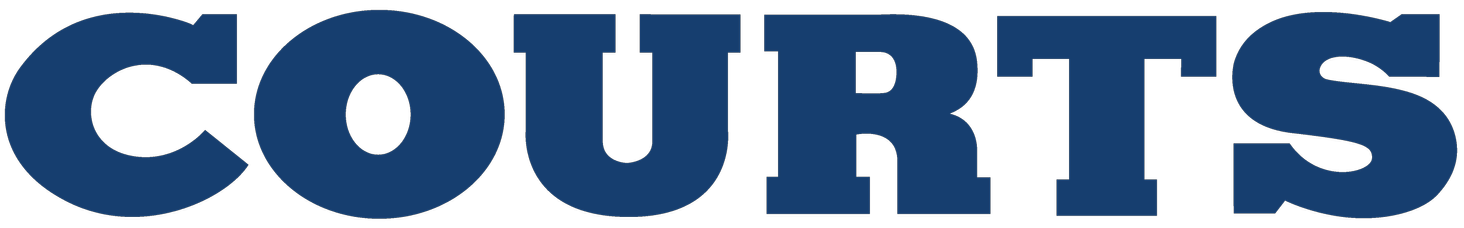
- Type: Private
- Industry: Retail
- Founded: 1850
- Area served: Antigua and Barbuda; Barbados; Belize; Curacao; Dominica; Grenada; Guyana; Jamaica; St. Kitts and Nevis; St. Lucia; Saint Vincent and the Grenadines; Trinidad and Tobago; United Kingdom (trademarks only); United States
- Owner: Unicomer Group
- Website: courts.com

Courts is a furniture and electronics retailer, founded by William Henry Court in Canterbury, England in 1850.

In 1959, Courts opened its first store in Jamaica, and subsequently grew across the Caribbean. In 2004, Courts plc went into administration in the United Kingdom. Its Caribbean operations and defunct UK trademarks were later acquired by Unicomer Group in 2006, who now operate the Courts brand across 13 countries.

== History ==
Courts was founded in 1850, by William Henry Court, with a single store in Canterbury, England. In 1945, the company was sold to the Cohen brothers, who began to expand the business. Hire purchase terms were offered from 1946. Courts was listed on London Stock Exchange in 1959. By this stage, Courts had thirty four retail stores in the United Kingdom.

In 1959, Courts expanded into the Caribbean, and opened its first store in Kingston, Jamaica. By 1965, a further store was opened in Barbados, and the product range was diversified to include electricals. Courts Jamaica listed on the Jamaica Stock Exchange in 1969. In 1978, Courts Barbados listed on the Barbados Stock Exchange.

In December 2001, after Courts plc breached a number of its banking covenants, the company's banks appointed PwC to safeguard their debts.

On Monday 29 November 2004, shares in Courts plc were suspended at 13.5p and the company went into administration, with debts of £280 million. PwC earned record fees for both pre administration and post administration work. The reasons given for entering administration were a fall in sales in the country, combined with the financial cost of the damage caused by Hurricane Ivan to the company's Caribbean arm.

The administration caused public controversy, because the sudden store closures had seen a number of outlets almost besieged and in some cases damaged by angry customers and left thousands of customers out of pocket, without the furniture they had ordered and deposits they had paid. SB Capital, owners of Furnitureland, acquired the largest number of former UK branches.

All stores in the United Kingdom were closed, and overseas subsidiaries were sold, with most going to Unicomer Group. Courts plc in the UK was eventually dissolved as a company.

A store branded Courts Caribbean is located in Jamaica, New York to serve Caribbean immigrants living in the United States wishing to send gifts to family members in their countries of birth. The American store positions itself as an ethnic and nostalgic brand. As of November 2023, there are four Courts stores in the US, located in Jamaica, Brooklyn, The Bronx and Miramar, Florida. These all operated by Unicomer Group.

== Other retailers trading as Courts ==
=== Asia (Nojima Corporation) ===
Courts expanded into Singapore in 1971. The Malaysian and Singaporean operations (which had previously operated stores in Indonesia and Thailand) were consolidated under Courts Asia Ltd once Courts plc in the UK ceased, which has since opened new stores in Indonesia. Courts Asia was acquired by Nojima Corporation in 2019.

=== Australia / Oceania (Vision Investments Limited) ===
Courts expanded into Fiji in 1971. Courts branded stores are operated in Fiji and Papua New Guinea by Vision Investments Limited. Courts also makes furniture in Fiji taking advantage of locally grown Mahogany.

=== Africa (Bramcom Holding) ===
BAIC-subsidiary Bramcom Holding acquired the Mauritius and Madagascar operations, and co-founded Victoria Courts in Kenya in partnership with Nairobi-based Victoria Furnitures. Following the collapse of BAIC in 2015, the Mauritius stores were acquired in a management buyout, after a failed acquisition attempt by Courts Asia.
