= Larry Gomes Stadium =

Stadium in Malabar, Trinidad and Tobago

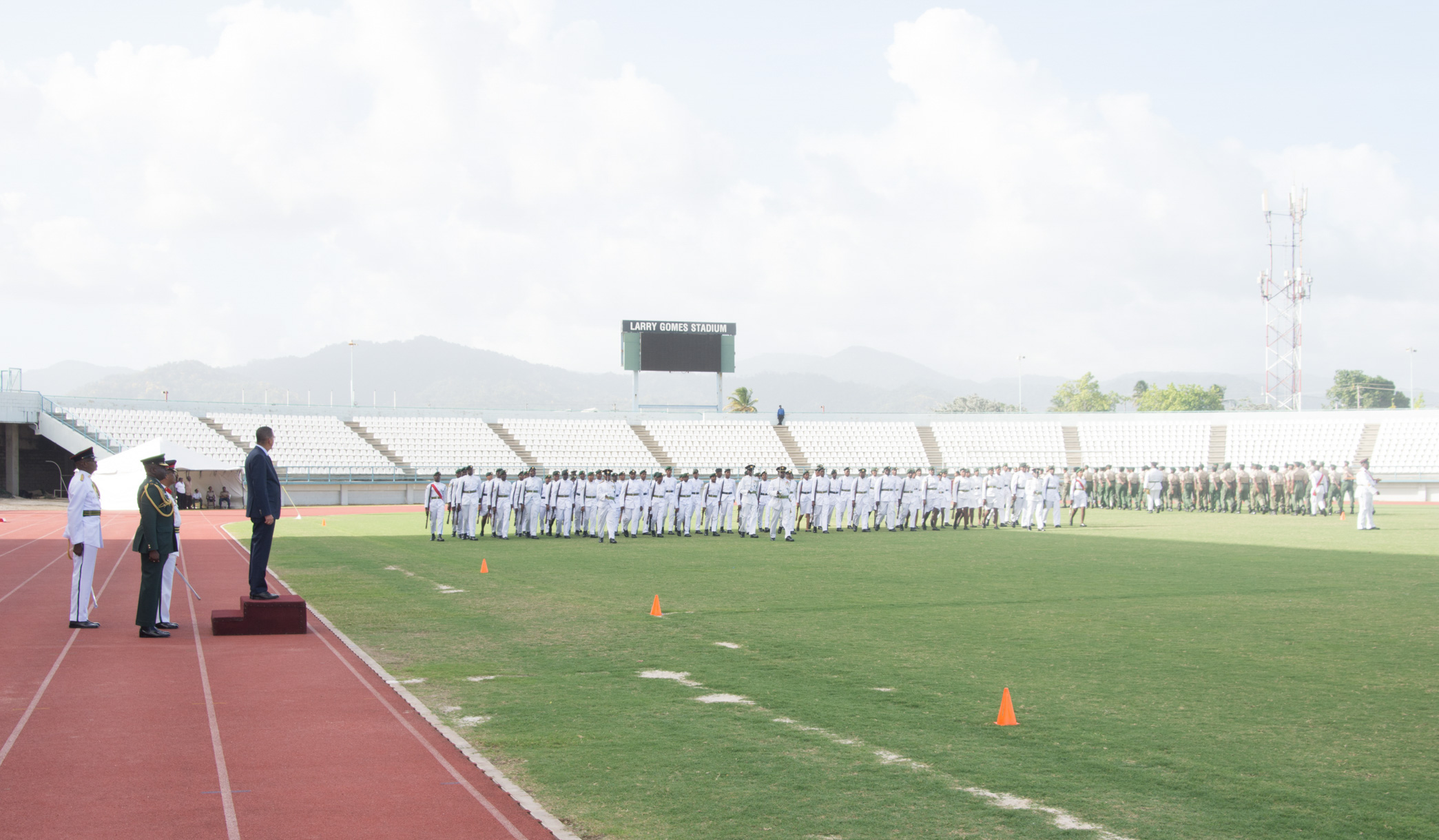
- Interactive map of Larry Gomes Stadium
- Location: TBD Road, Arima, Trinidad and Tobago
- Coordinates: 10.6165°N 61.2825°W
- Capacity: 10,000
- Surface: Grass

Construction
- Opened: 2001

Tenant
- Morvant Caledonia United

The Larry Gomes Stadium, located in Malabar, Arima, Trinidad and Tobago, is named for West Indies cricketer Larry Gomes. The stadium was constructed for the 2001 U-17 World Cup, which was hosted by Trinidad and Tobago. It also hosted games in the 2010 FIFA U-17 Women's World Cup.
