= 2023–24 Jamaica Premier League =

Jamaican football league

Jamaica Premier League
- Season: 2023–24
- Dates: 22 October 2023 - 19 May 2024
- Champions: Cavalier (3rd title)
- Relegated: Lime Hall; Treasure Beach
- CONCACAF Caribbean Cup: Cavalier; Mount Pleasant
- CFU Caribbean Club Shield: Arnett Gardens
- Matches played: 192
- Goals scored: 490 (2.55 per match)
- Top goalscorer: (Jamaica) Javane Bryan (17 goals)
- Biggest home win: Cavalier 6–0 Molynes United (7 April 2024); Humble Lions 6–0 Lime Hall (25 March 2024)
- Biggest away win: Lime Hall 0–6 Harbour View (20 March 2024)
- Highest scoring: Molynes United 3–6 Tivoli Gardens (20 March 2024)
- Longest winning run: 6 Wins; Mount Pleasant; Cavalier
- Longest unbeaten run: 17 Matches; Mount Pleasant
- Longest winless run: 16 Matches; Lime Hall
- Longest losing run: 12 Losses; Treasure Beach
- All statistics correct as of 26 June 2024.

The 2023–24 Jamaica Premier League was the 50th season of the top-tier football league in Jamaica. The season began on October 22, 2023, and concluded on May 19, 2024. 14 teams competed in the league, with Mount Pleasant F.A. being the defending champions. Wray and Nephew Group replaced Digicel as the new title sponsor at the start of the season. Cavalier won the league to earn their 3rd JPL title.

== Background ==
Two pre-season friendlies were announced by Professional Football Jamaica Limited (PFJL) prior to the start of the 2023–24 season. The friendlies would first see Mount Pleasant face Cavalier in the “Powerade Finals Rematch” on October 15, followed by Arnett Gardens vs Waterhouse in the second staging of the “Boom El Classico” on October 16.

While Mount Pleasant defeated Cavalier 3–1 in the Powerade Finals rematch held at the Drax Hall Sports Complex, there were uncertainties whether the Boom El Classico match would be allowed to be hosted at the Anthony Spaulding Sports Complex due to curfews in the surrounding areas. The match was later postponed to October 20 with the venue changed to the Drewsland Mini-Stadium. Arnett Gardens defeated Waterhouse 2–0 to retain the Boom El Classico trophy after also running out winners in the inaugural edition held in the 2022 preseason.

== Overview ==
The season kicked off on 22 October 2023, with 6 of the 7 scheduled match week one fixtures contested. Cavalier and Harbour View match week one and two fixtures were postponed due to both teams involvement in the knockout stage of the 2023 CONCACAF Caribbean Cup.

In a late announcement by the PFJL, all 5 match week two fixtures on Sunday, 29 October 2023, were postponed due to Reggae Girls hosting Guatemala at home in the 2024 CONCACAF W Gold Cup qualification competition.

Newly promoted premier league club Lime Hall parted ways with head coach David Pryce on November 20. Pryce walked away after guiding the team through three rounds of matches during which they garnered only a single point. Molynes United head coach, Alex Thomas, became the second managerial causality of the season. Thomas parted ways with Molynes on November 29 after a run of 4 consecutive losses, leaving the club sitting at the bottom of the table and winless after 7 match weeks.

Cavalier and Harbour View match week seven and eight fixtures were postponed due to both teams respective involvement in the finals and third place matches of the 2023 CONCACAF Caribbean Cup.

All postponed matches were rescheduled as midweek fixtures leading up to the halfway point of the season, with each team playing 13 matches by the end of the first round. Defending champions, Mount Pleasant, led the table with 28 points after winning their first 6 matches. Portmore United, displaying strong form and the best defense, trailed closely with 27 points. Despite a shaky start, Cavalier rallied with 6 consecutive victories, tying with Portmore United. Tivoli Gardens, Arnett Gardens, and Dunbeholden secured the remaining playoff spots in the top six.

=== Derbies ===
==== Match Week 4 ====
Match week four was promoted as derby day, with two local derbies, the "Portmore Derby" and the "West Kingston Derby", scheduled on 12 November 2023. The Portmore Derby, the newer of the two, saw Dunbeholden square up against Portmore United at the Ferdi Neita Sports Complex. While the more established and historic West Kingston Derby between Arnett Gardens and Tivoli Gardens was hosted at the Anthony Spaulding Sports Complex.

===== Portmore Derby =====
Portmore United defeated Dunbeholden 2–0 in the Portmore Derby. The fiercely contested matchup saw both team go down to 10 players. Dunbeholden's Rohan Brown was shown a straight red card in the 12th minute and Portmore United's Emelio Rousseau shown a straight red card in the 70th minute for violent conduct.

===== West Kingston Derby =====
Tivoli Gardens defeated Arnett Gardens 3–1 in the West Kingston Derby to mark their first derby victory at their arch-nemesis home ground since 2019. Justin Dunn netted all 3 goals for Tivoli Gardens to earn the premier league's first hat-trick of season, he was rewarded with the man of the match award for his outstanding derby performance.

==== Match Week 17 ====
Match week 17 featured the return fixtures of both local derbies. The Portmore Derby was hosted at the Fredi Neita Sports Complex again, while the West Kingston Derby was hosted at Stadium East Field.

===== Portmore Derby =====
The return leg of the Portmore Derby ended in a 1–1 draw. Dunbeholden took the lead with a 24th-minute goal from Chevoy Watkin, but Steven Young equalized for Portmore United in the 75th minute. Saneekie Burton was shown a red card in the 88th minute.

===== West Kingston Derby =====
Tivoli Gardens completed the double over Arnett Gardens with a 3–1 victory in their second encounter, cementing their dominance over their eternal rivals. Arnett Gardens seized the initiative when captain and talisman Fabian Reid lobbed the ball accurately from outside the 18-yard box, beating the onrushing Tivoli Gardens goalkeeper in the 57th minute to notch his 80th career goal for Arnett Gardens in the Jamaica Premier League.

However, Tivoli Gardens faced a setback when Howard Morris was shown a straight red card in the 62nd minute for deliberately striking an opponent in the face during a challenge for a loose ball. Despite being reduced to 10 men, Tivoli Gardens maintained their relentless pressure and were rewarded with a penalty in the 73rd minute, expertly converted by striker Justin Dunn, bringing his season tally to 10 goals.

Undeterred, Tivoli Gardens continued to press forward and eventually took the lead in the 76th minute through a goal by substitute Steven Clarke. Notably, Clarke, a former Arnett Gardens player, refrained from celebrating the goal as a sign of respect to his former club. Clarke then secured victory for Tivoli Gardens with another goal in the 80th minute, sealing a memorable win for his team.

== Teams ==
Fourteen teams competed in the league — the top twelve teams from the previous season and two promoted teams from the second division. The two promoted teams were Lime Hall and Treasure Beach. Lime Hall made a return to the league since the 2010-11 season in which they competed under the name Benfica. Treasure Beach made their debut in the Jamaica Premier League. They replaced Faulkland and Chapelton Maroons, both of whom previously made their debut in the league. They finished 13th and 14th, respectively, at the conclusion of the 2022–23 season and were relegated to the second division.

Location of teams in the 2023–24 Jamaica Premier League

=== Stadiums and locations ===
Team	Location	Stadium	Stadium Capacity
Arnett Gardens	Kingston	Anthony Spaulding Sports Complex	6,000
Cavalier	Kingston	Stadium East	3,000
Dunbeholden	Portmore	Dunbeholden Sports Complex	1,500
Harbour View	Kingston	Harbour View Football Club Stadium	7,000
Humble Lion	May Pen	Effortville Community Centre	1,500
Lime Hall Academy	Brown's Town	Draxhall Sports Complex	3,500
Molynes United	Kingston	Jasceria Park Recreational Center	1,500
Montego Bay United	Montego Bay	Wespow Park	3,000
Mount Pleasant Football Academy	Runaway Bay	Draxhall Sports Complex	3,500
Portmore United	Portmore	Ferdie Neita Sports Complex	3,000
Tivoli Gardens	Kingston	Edward Seaga Sports Complex	5,000
Treasure Beach	Treasure Beach	St. Elizabeth Technical High School	3,000
Vere United	Hayes	Wembley Centre of Excellence	4,000
Waterhouse	Kingston	Waterhouse Mini Stadium	5,000

Source: Jamaica Premier League

=== Personnel and kits ===
Team	Manager	Captain	Shirt Sponsor (chest)	Kit Manufacturer
Arnett Gardens	(Jamaica) Xavier Gilbert	(Jamaica) Fabian Reid	Lasco iCool	Admiral Sportswear
Cavalier Football Club	(Jamaica) Rudolph Speid	(Jamaica) Kyle Ming	Foska Oats	Admiral Sportswear
Dunbeholden Football Club	(Jamaica) Lenworth Hyde	(Jamaica) Ricardo Thomas	Sagicor Group Jamaica Limited	Admiral Sportswear
Harbour View Football Club	(Jamaica) Ludlow Bernard	TBC	VM Group Limited	Admiral Sportswear
Humble Lion Football Club	(Jamaica) Vassell Reynolds	(Jamaica) Andrew Vanzie	none	Admiral Sportswear
Lime Hall Academy Football Club	(Jamaica) Valnie Clark	(Jamaica) Damani Sewell	Lynk Digital Payments	Admiral Sportswear
Molynes United Football Club	(Jamaica) Donald Stewart	(Jamaica) Jason Wright	Konnexx Services Limited	Admiral Sportswear
Montego Bay United Football Club	(Brazil) Neider Dos Santos	(Jamaica) Nevaun Turner	Mastercard	Admiral Sportswear
Mount Pleasant Football Academy	(Jamaica) Theodore Whitmore	(Jamaica) Sue-Lae McCalla	CONSERVE IT Limited	Admiral Sportswear
Portmore United Football Club	(Jamaica) Phillip Williams	(Jamaica) Seigle Knight	Kemtek Development & Construction Limited	Admiral Sportswear
Tivoli Gardens Football Club	(Jamaica) Jerome Waite	(Jamaica) Barrington Pryce	JN Money	Admiral Sportswear
Treasure Beach Football Club	TBC	(Jamaica) Ramario Thompson	none	Admiral Sportswear
Vere United Football Club	(Jamaica) Linval Dixon	(Jamaica) Javier Brown	none	Admiral Sportswear
Waterhouse Football Club	(Jamaica) Marcel Gayle	(Jamaica) Kemar Foster	Bert's Auto Parts	Admiral Sportswear

Source: Admiral - Jamaica Premier League Store

Note
- All kits were exclusively manufactured by Admiral Sportswear from an agreement signed between the league and sport-ware company in 2022.
- Arnett Gardens, Humble Lions, Treasure Beach & Vere United began the season without front shirt sponsors.
- All kits (shirts and shorts) display logos of the league's title sponsor, Wray & Nephew, and affiliate sponsors Proven and JustBet.

=== Managerial changes ===
Team	Outgoing Manager	Manner of Departure	Date of Vacancy	Incoming Manager	Date of Appointment
Arnett Gardens	(Jamaica) Paul Davis	End of Contract	11 July 2023	(Jamaica) Xavier Gilbert	21 August 2023
Dunbeholden	(Jamaica) Harold Thomas	End of Contract	11 July 2023	(Jamaica) Lenworth Hyde	August 2023
Tivoli Gardens	(Jamaica) Jermaine Johnson	Mutual Consent	11 July 2023	(Jamaica) Jerome Waite	August 2023
Lime Hall	(Jamaica) David Pryce	Stepped Down	20 November 2023	(Jamaica) Valnie Clark	4 December 2023
Molynes United	(Jamaica) Alex Thomas	Sacked	29 November 2023	(Jamaica) Donald Stewart	4 December 2023
Humble Lions	(Jamaica) Andrew Price	Sacked	27 December 2023	(Jamaica) Vassell Reynolds	27 December 2023
Treasure Beach	(Jamaica) Omar Wedderburn	Stepped Down	4 February 2023	(Jamaica) Victor Ebanks	TBC

== Regular season ==
=== League table ===
Pos	Team	Pld	W	D	L	GF	GA	GD	Pts	Qualification or relegation
1	Mount Pleasant	26	18	5	3	37	15	+22	59	Advanced to Playoffs (Semifinals)
2	Cavalier (C)	26	16	6	4	48	17	+31	54	Advanced to Playoffs (Semifinals)
3	Tivoli Gardens	26	15	6	5	51	23	+28	51	Advanced to Playoffs (Quarterfinals)
4	Portmore United	26	13	10	3	37	16	+21	49	Advanced to Playoffs (Quarterfinals)
5	Arnett Gardens	26	14	7	5	44	24	+20	49	Advanced to Playoffs (Quarterfinals)
6	Waterhouse	26	12	7	7	38	22	+16	43	Advanced to Playoffs (Quarterfinals)
7	Montego Bay United	26	12	7	7	39	29	+10	43	
8	Dunbeholden	26	10	7	9	34	33	+1	37	
9	Vere United	26	7	6	13	27	36	−9	27	
10	Humble Lions	26	7	4	15	30	47	−17	25	
11	Molynes United	26	5	8	13	29	55	−26	23	
12	Harbour View	26	5	7	14	32	39	−7	22	
13	Treasure Beach (R)	26	3	4	19	17	52	−35	13	Relegated to JFF Championship
14	Lime Hall (R)	26	1	4	21	14	69	−55	7	Relegated to JFF Championship

(C) Champions; (R) Relegated

=== Results ===
Home \ Away	ARN	CAV	DUN	HAR	HUM	LIM	MBU	MOL	MTP	POR	TIV	TRE	VER	WAT
Arnett Gardens	—	2–2	0–0	2–1	5–1	3–0	3–1	4–1	2–0	1–1	1–3	2–0	2–0	1–0
Cavalier	3–0	—	1–0	1–0	1–1	4–0	1–0	6–0	2–1	0–1	1–1	1–0	2–0	1–1
Dunbeholden	0–1	2–4	—	3–0	1–0	2–1	0–2	2–1	1–2	0–2	2–2	1–1	4–2	2–1
Harbour View	2–2	1–3	2–0	—	2–2	3–0	0–3	0–1	1–2	1–1	0–3	1–2	0–0	1–2
Humble Lions	0–2	1–2	0–0	2–4	—	6–0	3–2	1–1	0–1	1–4	0–2	1–0	3–0	1–5
Lime Hall	1–1	1–1	1–4	0–6	0–1	—	0–0	1–2	1–4	0–2	1–4	1–0	1–4	1–3
Montego Bay United	0–0	1–0	1–2	2–2	3–0	3–0	—	2–1	1–2	3–2	2–1	1–0	2–0	2–2
Molynes United	0–4	0–3	2–4	2–2	3–2	0–0	2–1	—	1–3	2–2	3–6	1–2	0–0	0–3
Mount Pleasant	2–0	2–0	3–0	2–0	1–0	2–1	1–1	1–1	—	1–0	1–0	1–0	0–2	0–0
Portmore United	2–0	1–0	1–1	1–0	2–0	3–0	1–1	2–0	1–1	—	0–0	3–1	0–1	0–0
Tivoli Gardens	3–1	0–0	1–1	1–0	4–1	3–1	1–2	1–0	0–1	0–0	—	3–2	1–2	3–0
Treasure Beach	1–4	0–5	0–0	0–2	0–1	1–0	1–2	2–2	0–2	1–3	0–5	—	0–2	2–4
Vere United	0–1	1–3	1–2	1–1	2–1	6–2	1–1	0–2	0–0	0–1	1–2	0–0	—	0–1
Waterhouse	0–0	0–1	1–0	1–0	0–1	1–0	3–0	1–1	0–1	1–1	0–1	4–1	4–1	—

Legend: Blue = home team win; Yellow = draw; Red = away team win.

== Playoffs ==
=== Bracket ===
Quarterfinals
6	Waterhouse	1	2	3
3	Tivoli Gardens	1	0	1
5	Arnett Gardens	1	1	2
4	Portmore United	1	0	1

Semifinals
6	Waterhouse	1	1	2
1	Mount Pleasant	1	2	3
5	Arnett Gardens	1	1	2
2	Cavalier	1	3	4

Finals
Mount Pleasant	1 (3)
Cavalier (p)	1 (4)
3rd place match
Waterhouse	1
Arnett Gardens	5

=== Results ===
==== Quarter finals ====
22 April 2024
First Leg

Waterhouse	1–1	Tivoli Gardens
J. Bryan 44' (pen.)	Report	L. Russell 74'

Sabina Park, Kingston
Referee: O. Nicholson
29 April 2024
Second Leg

Tivoli Gardens	0–2	Waterhouse
	Report	J. Bryan 14'; A. Fletcher 45+6'

Sabina Park, Kingston
Referee: O. Nation

Waterhouse won 3–1 on aggregate and advanced to the semi-finals.

22 April 2024
Second Leg

Arnett Gardens	1–1	Portmore United
F. Reid 82'	Report	P. Wing 41' (o.g.)

Sabina Park, Kingston
Referee: C. Mason
29 April 2024
Second Leg

Portmore United	0–1	Arnett Gardens
	Report	F. Reid 90'

Sabina Park, Kingston
Referee: O. Hamilton

Arnett Gardens won 2–1 on aggregate and advanced to semi-finals.

==== Semi-finals ====
5 May 2024
First Leg

Waterhouse	1–1	Mount Pleasant
J. Bryan 46'	Report	S. McCalla 73'

Sabina Park, Kingston
Referee: C. Mason
12 May 2024
Second Leg

Mount Pleasant	2–1	Waterhouse
D. Campbell 41', 56'	Report	K. Simpson 90+4'

Sabina Park, Kingston
Referee: O. Hamilton

Mount Pleasant won 3–2 on aggregate and advanced to JPL Finals.

First Leg

Arnett Gardens	1–1	Cavalier
J. Thomas 40'	Report	J. Calvin 43'

Sabina Park, Kingston
Referee: A. Perry
12 May 2024
Second Leg

Cavalier	3–1	Arnett Gardens
D. Atkinson 14' (pen.); A. Reid 45+6'; J. Calvin 90+1'	Report	C. Willis 45+10'

Sabina Park, Kingston
Referee: O. Nicholson

Cavalier won 4–2 on aggregate and advanced to JPL Finals.

==== Third place playoff ====
May 19, 2024

Waterhouse	1–5	Arnett Gardens
J. Dorman 34'	Report	S. Smith 25', 67'; K. Dixon 46', 90'; F. Reid 52'

Independence Park, Kingston
Referee: A. Perry

==== Jamaica Premier League Finals ====
19 May 2024

Mount Pleasant	1–1	Cavalier
D. Campbell 65'	Report	R. King 67'
Penalties
(penalty scored) J. Topey; (penalty scored) A. Bygrave; (penalty missed) L. Richie; (penalty missed) R. Guthrie; (penalty scored) S. McCalla	3—4	(penalty missed) D. Atkinson; (penalty scored) G. Irving; (penalty scored) R. King; (penalty scored) A. Reid; (penalty scored) N. Hamilton

Independence Park, Kingston
Referee: O. Nation

== Champions ==
Jamaica Premier League Champions
(gold) Cavalier
3rd title

== Season statistics ==
=== Top scorers ===
Rank	Player	Club	Goals
1	(Jamaica) Javane Bryan	Waterhouse	17
2	(Jamaica) Justin Dunn	Tivoli Gardens	16
3	(Antigua and Barbuda) Jalmaro Calvin	Cavalier	13
3	(Jamaica) Fabian Reid	Arnett Gardens	13
5	(Jamaica) Andre Fletcher	Waterhouse	12
5	(Jamaica) Jason Wright	Molynes United	12
7	(Jamaica) Kemar Beckford	Vere United	10
7	(Jamaica) Shaqueil Bradford	Mount Pleasant	10
7	(Jamaica) Nicholas Nelson	Dunbeholden	10
10	(Jamaica) Chevaugh Walsh	Portmore United	9

=== Hat-tricks ===
Date	Player	Club	Match Result	Scored Against
12 November 2023	(Jamaica) Justin Dunn	Tivoli Gardens	3-1	Arnett Gardens
20 November 2023	(Jamaica) Javane Bryan	Waterhouse	4-1	Vere United
22 January 2024	(Jamaica) Fabian Reid	Arnett Gardens	4-1	Molynes United
25 February 2024	(Jamaica) Nicholas Nelson	Dunbeholden	4-2	Molynes United
25 February 2024	(Jamaica) Kemar Beckford	Vere United	6-2	Lime Hall
20 March 2024	(Jamaica) Andre Fletcher	Waterhouse	4-2	Treasure Beach
20 March 2024	(Jamaica) Justin Dunn	Tivoli Gardens	6-3	Molynes United
20 March 2024	(Jamaica) Jason Wright	Molynes United	3-6	Tivoli Gardens
25 March 2024	(Jamaica) Cleo Clark	Humble Lions	6-0	Lime Hall
7 April 2024	(Jamaica) Rojay Smith	Dunbeholden	4-2	Vere United

== Awards ==
=== Match Week Awards ===
Proven Player of the Week Award
Match Week	Player of the Week	
Match Week	Player	Club
1	none awarded	
2	(Jamaica) Javane Bryan	Waterhouse
3	(Jamaica) Alex Marshall	Portmore United
4	(Jamaica) Justin Dunn	Tivoli Gardens
5	(Jamaica) Javane Bryan	Waterhouse
6	(Jamaica) Nicholas Nelson	Dunbeholden
7	(Jamaica) Nicholas Nelson	Dunbeholden
8	(Jamaica) Deonjay Brown	Montego Bay United
9	(Jamaica) Justin Dunn	Tivoli Gardens
10	(Jamaica) Andre Fletcher	Waterhouse
11	(Jamaica) Daniel Hardy	Molynes United
12	none awarded	
13	(Jamaica) Chevaughn Walsh	Portmore United
14	none awarded	
15	(Jamaica) Fabian Reid	Arnett Gardens
16	none awarded	
17	(Jamaica) Steven Clarke	Tivoli Gardens
