= 2024–25 Jamaica Premier League =

Jamaican football league

Jamaica Premier League
- Season: 2024–25
- Dates: 15 September 2024 – 23 May 2025
- Champions: Cavalier
- Relegated: Vere United; Humble Lions
- CONCACAF Caribbean Cup: Cavalier; Mount Pleasant
- CFU Club Shield: Arnett Gardens
- Matches: 247
- Goals: 615 (2.49 per match)
- Top goalscorer: (Jamaica) Warner Brown (22 goals)
- Biggest home win: Tivoli Gardens 6–0 Harbour View (24 November 2024)
- Biggest away win: Vere United 0–6 Mount Pleasant (28 November 2024)
- Highest scoring: Tivoli Gardens 3–5 Arnett Gardens (03 February 2025); Molynes United 2–6 Mount Pleasant (14 February 2025)
- Longest winning run: 12 wins Mount Pleasant
- Longest unbeaten run: 14 matches Mount Pleasant
- Longest winless run: 11 matches Harbour View; Vere United
- Longest losing run: 7 losses Vere United
- All statistics correct as of 14 April 2025.

The 2024–25 Jamaica Premier League was the 51st season of the top-tier football league in Jamaica. The season began on September 15, 2024 and concluded on May 23, 2025. Cavalier were the defending champions having won their third title the previous season.

The season was scheduled with three rounds of preliminary games, returning to its pre-COVID structure. The return to three rounds increased the number of games each team played from 26 to 39 regular-season matches, followed by the playoffs.

Cavalier were crowned champions after winning the playoff finals, becoming the first team since 2019 to win consecutive JPL titles.

== Teams ==
Fourteen teams are competing in the league — the top twelve teams from the previous season and two promoted teams from the second division. The two promoted teams are Chapelton Maroons and Racing United. They replaced Treasure Beach and Lime Hall which finished 13th and 14th, respectively, at the conclusion of the 2023–24 season and were relegated to the second division.

Chapelton Maroons are making their second appearance in Jamaica's top flight league after one season away, they were relegated at the end of their debut season in the 2022–23 campaign. Racing United will be making their debut in the Jamaica Premier League, becoming the latest club to feature from Jamaica's third city; Portmore.

Location of teams in the 2023–24 Jamaica Premier League

| Pos. | Relegated from 2023-24 Premier League |
|---|---|
| 13th | Treasure Beach |
| 14th | Lime Hall Academy |

| Pos. | Promoted from 2023-24 JFF Championship |
|---|---|
| Winners | Chapelton Maroons |
| Runner-up | Racing United |

=== Stadiums and locations ===
| Team | Location | Stadium | Stadium Capacity |
|---|---|---|---|
| Arnett Gardens | Kingston | Anthony Spaulding Sports Complex | 6,000 |
| Cavalier | Kingston | Stadium East | 3,000 |
| Chapelton Maroons | Chapelton | Anthony Spaulding Sports Complex | 6,000 |
| Dunbeholden | Portmore | Dunbeholden Sports Complex | 1,500 |
| Harbour View | Kingston | Harbour View Stadium | 7,000 |
| Humble Lion | May Pen | Effortville Community Centre | 1,500 |
| Molynes United | Kingston | Jasceria Park Recreational Center | 1,500 |
| Montego Bay United | Montego Bay | Catherine Hall Sports Complex | 7,000 |
| Mount Pleasant | Runaway Bay | Draxhall Sports Complex | 3,500 |
| Portmore United | Portmore | Ferdie Neita Sports Complex | 3,000 |
| Racing United | Portmore | Ferdie Neita Sports Complex | 3,000 |
| Tivoli Gardens | Kingston | Edward Seaga Sports Complex | 5,000 |
| Vere United | Hayes | Wembley Centre of Excellence | 4,000 |
| Waterhouse | Kingston | Waterhouse Mini Stadium | 5,000 |

Source: Jamaica Premier League

== Personnel and kits ==
| Team | Manager | Captain | Shirt Sponsor (chest) | Kit Manufacturer |
|---|---|---|---|---|
| Arnett Gardens | (Jamaica) Xavier Gilbert | (Jamaica) Fabian Reid | iCool Water | Admiral Sportswear |
| Cavalier | (Jamaica) Rudolph Speid | (Jamaica) Richard King | Foska Oats | Admiral Sportswear |
| Chapelton Maroons | (Jamaica) Vassell Reynolds | (Jamaica) Gawain Austin | n/a | Admiral Sportswear |
| Dunbeholden | (Jamaica) Harold Thomas | (Jamaica) Fabian McCarthy | National Commercial Bank of Jamaica | Admiral Sportswear |
| Harbour View | (Jamaica) Donald Stewart | (Jamaica) Garth Stewart | VM Group Limited | Admiral Sportswear |
| Humble Lion | (Jamaica) Alex Thomas | (Jamaica) Odane Murray | n/a | Admiral Sportswear |
| Molynes United | (Jamaica) Jermaine Thomas | (Jamaica) Jason Wright | n/a | Admiral Sportswear |
| Montego Bay United | (Jamaica) Paul Davis | (Jamaica) Owayne Gordon | Sunshine Snacks | Admiral Sportswear |
| Mount Pleasant | (Jamaica) Theodore Whitmore | (Jamaica) Sue-Lae McCalla | Powerade | Admiral Sportswear |
| Portmore United | (Jamaica) Rodolph Austin | (Jamaica) Seigle Knight | Kemtek Development & Construction Limited | Admiral Sportswear |
| Racing United | (Jamaica) Anthony Patrick | (Jamaica) Marcovich Brown | Pepsi | Admiral Sportswear |
| Tivoli Gardens | (Jamaica) Jerome Waite | (Jamaica) Barrington Pryce | JN Money | Admiral Sportswear |
| Vere United | (Jamaica) Lenworth Hyde | (Trinidad and Tobago) Matthew Woo Ling | Sagicor Group Jamaica Limited | Admiral Sportswear |
| Waterhouse | (Jamaica) Marcel Gayle | (Jamaica) Kemar Foster | Bert's Auto Parts | Admiral Sportswear |

Source: Jamaica Premier League, Admiral - Jamaica Premier League Store

=== Managerial changes ===
| Team | Outgoing Manager | Manner of Departure | Date of Vacancy | Incoming Manager | Date of Appointment |
|---|---|---|---|---|---|
| Montego Bay United | (Brazil) Neider Dos Santos | Contract Terminated | 28 May 2024 | (Argentina) Rodolfo Zapata | 10 July 2024 |
| Portmore United | (Jamaica) Phillip Williams | End of Contract | 30 June 2024 | (Jamaica) Davion Ferguson | 1 July 2024 |
| Dunbeholden | (Jamaica) Lenworth Hyde | End of Contract | July 2024 | (Jamaica) Phillip Williams | July 2024 |
| Mount Pleasant | (Jamaica) Theodore Whitmore | End of Contract | 31 July 2024 | (Jamaica) Harold Thomas | 1 August 2024 |
| Vere United | (Jamaica) Linval Dixon | End of Contract | August 2024 | (Jamaica) Lenworth Hyde | August 2024 |

== Foreign Players ==
The clubs can have a maximum of six foreign players in their Jamaica Premier League squads per match, but there is no limit of foreigners in the clubs' squads.

- Players marked in **bold** indicate they were registered during mid-season transfer window.
- Players marked in italics indicate they had left their respective clubs during mid-season transfer window.

| Club | Player 1 | Player 2 | Player 3 | Player 4 | Player 5 | Player 6 | Player 7 | Former Players |
|---|---|---|---|---|---|---|---|---|
| Arnett Gardens | | | | | | | | |
| Cavalier | (Saint Lucia) Vino Barclett | (Suriname) Shaquille Stein | (Trinidad and Tobago) Kaïlé Auvray | **(Haiti) Shad San Milan** | **(Suriname) Jamilhio Rigters** | | | (Saint Lucia) Darren Donaie |
| Chapelton Maroons | (Brazil) Willian | (Saint Lucia) Shanoi Evnas | | | | | | |
| Dunbeholden | | | | | | | | |
| Harbour View | (Suriname) Demelcio Fer | (Nigeria) Chidalu Chukwuemeka | (Saint Lucia) Alvinus Myers | (Dominica) Javid George | | | | |
| Humble Lions | (Trinidad and Tobago) Glenroy Samuel | | | | | | | |
| Molynes United | **(Saint Lucia) Darren Donaie** | **(Saint Lucia) Dante Fitz** | | | | | | |
| Montego Bay United | (Trinidad and Tobago) Aaron Enill | (Trinidad and Tobago) Jordan Britto | (Trinidad and Tobago) Darnell Hospedales | (Brazil) Lucas Lima | (Trinidad and Tobago) Josiah Trimmingham | **(Brazil) Jean Claudio Ferreira** | **(Trinidad and Tobago) Che Benny** | |
| Mount Pleasant | (Haiti) Celestine Franco | **(Saint Lucia) Melvin Doxilly** | **(United States) Cooper Nugent** | **(Haiti) Clifford Thomas** | | | | (Haiti) Shad San Milan, (Brazil) Jean Claudio Ferreira, (Cameroon) Wilfried Rayonne, (Trinidad and Tobago) Nathaniel James, (Panama) Jonathan Cecena |
| Portmore United | (Canada) Zion Richards | | | | | | | |
| Racing United | | | | | | | | |
| Tivoli Gardens | | | | | | | | |
| Vere United | (Trinidad and Tobago) Matthew Woo Ling | (Dominica) David Juba | (Guyana) Ravi Coates | **(Saint Vincent and the Grenadines) Shemron Phillips** | **(England) Destiny Oladipo** | **(Brazil) Marcos Pegoretti** | | |
| Waterhouse | (Guyana) Kvist Paul | **(Barbados) Omani Leacock** | | | | | | |

=== Dual nationality ===
Players who are Jamaican nationals but also hold dual citizenship or represent another FIFA nation in international football are not regarded as foreign players and do not take up a foreign player slot.

- (Antigua and Barbuda) Jalmaro Calvin (Cavalier)
- (Guyana) Romaine Brackenridge (Harbour View)

== Regular season ==
=== League table ===
| Pos | Team | Pld | W | D | L | GF | GA | GD | Pts | Qualification or relegation |
|---|---|---|---|---|---|---|---|---|---|---|
| 1 | Mount Pleasant (Q) | 39 | 29 | 6 | 4 | 94 | 21 | +73 | 93 | Advance to Playoffs (Semifinals) |
| 2 | Arnett Gardens (Q) | 39 | 22 | 10 | 7 | 74 | 39 | +35 | 76 | Advance to Playoffs (Semifinals) |
| 3 | Montego Bay United (Q) | 39 | 21 | 12 | 6 | 62 | 28 | +34 | 75 | Advance to Playoffs (Quarterfinals) |
| 4 | Cavalier (Q) | 39 | 18 | 15 | 6 | 65 | 43 | +22 | 69 | Advance to Playoffs (Quarterfinals) |
| 5 | Portmore United (Q) | 39 | 18 | 12 | 9 | 46 | 25 | +21 | 66 | Advance to Playoffs (Quarterfinals) |
| 6 | Tivoli Gardens (Q) | 39 | 15 | 13 | 11 | 61 | 48 | +13 | 58 | Advance to Playoffs (Quarterfinals) |
| 7 | Waterhouse | 39 | 16 | 10 | 13 | 44 | 42 | +2 | 58 | |
| 8 | Racing United | 39 | 13 | 12 | 14 | 43 | 50 | −7 | 51 | |
| 9 | Chapelton Maroons | 39 | 9 | 10 | 20 | 36 | 59 | −23 | 37 | |
| 10 | Dunbeholden | 39 | 10 | 7 | 22 | 34 | 67 | −33 | 37 | |
| 11 | Harbour View | 39 | 9 | 9 | 21 | 38 | 58 | −20 | 36 | |
| 12 | Molynes United | 39 | 9 | 8 | 22 | 40 | 76 | −36 | 35 | |
| 13 | Humble Lions (R) | 39 | 7 | 12 | 20 | 34 | 65 | −31 | 33 | Relegation to JFF Championship |
| 14 | Vere United (R) | 39 | 5 | 8 | 26 | 32 | 82 | −50 | 23 | Relegation to JFF Championship |

Source: JPL
(Q) Qualified for the phase indicated; (R) Relegated

=== Results ===
==== Matches 1-26 ====
| Home \ Away | ARN | CAV | CHA | DUN | HAR | HUM | MBU | MOL | MTP | POR | TIV | RAC | VER | WAT |
|---|---|---|---|---|---|---|---|---|---|---|---|---|---|---|
| Arnett Gardens | | 1–2 | 1–1 | 3–0 | 2–1 | 5–1 | 1–0 | 0–0 | 1–1 | 0–0 | 2–1 | 1–1 | 2–0 | 3–2 |
| Cavalier | 2–2 | | 1–3 | 4–1 | 0–1 | 3–1 | 1–1 | 5–1 | 2–2 | 2–1 | 0–0 | 1–1 | 2–1 | 2–2 |
| Chapelton Maroons | 1–1 | 1–2 | | 1–3 | 1–0 | 2–0 | 0–1 | 0–0 | 1–1 | 0–3 | 2–3 | 1–2 | 1–1 | 1–1 |
| Dunbeholden | 0–1 | 0–2 | 2–0 | | 1–0 | 3–2 | 2–0 | 0–2 | 3–2 | 3–3 | 2–1 | 2–2 | 1–1 | 1–0 |
| Harbour View | 0–1 | 0–0 | 1–2 | 4–1 | | 1–1 | 0–1 | 2–1 | 2–1 | 1–2 | 2–2 | 3–1 | 0–0 | 0–1 |
| Humble Lions | 1–2 | 1–1 | 1–0 | 0–0 | 1–1 | | 0–0 | 1–2 | 1–4 | 0–1 | 0–0 | 1–1 | 0–1 | 2–1 |
| Montego Bay United | 1–0 | 1–1 | 2–1 | 2–1 | 1–2 | 3–1 | | 4–0 | 1–1 | 0–0 | 3–1 | 0–0 | 2–0 | 3–1 |
| Molynes United | 0–3 | 0–3 | 4–0 | 0–1 | 3–1 | 0–1 | 0–2 | | 2–6 | 0–0 | 0–2 | 2–1 | 1–3 | 1–3 |
| Mount Pleasant | 2–0 | 3–0 | 1–0 | 4–0 | 3–1 | 5–0 | 3–0 | 4–0 | | 1–0 | 1–0 | 4–0 | 4–1 | 0–0 |
| Portmore United | 0–1 | 1–1 | 2–1 | 0–0 | 4–0 | 2–1 | 0–0 | 4–0 | 0–2 | | 2–1 | 1–1 | 2–0 | 0–0 |
| Tivoli Gardens | 3–5 | 1–1 | 1–1 | 2–0 | 6–0 | 5–1 | 2–4 | 0–0 | 0–1 | 1–1 | | 1–0 | 2–1 | 0–1 |
| Racing United | 0–2 | 1–0 | 1–0 | 1–0 | 1–0 | 1–1 | 0–4 | 3–2 | 2–3 | 1–1 | 2–0 | | 1–1 | 1–1 |
| Vere United | 0–2 | 1–2 | 2–1 | 3–0 | 1–1 | 1–1 | 1–4 | 0–5 | 0–6 | 0–2 | 2–2 | 0–3 | | 0–3 |
| Waterhouse | 0–1 | 0–2 | 0–3 | 3–2 | 1–0 | 2–0 | 1–1 | 1–1 | 0–3 | 1–0 | 0–1 | 1–0 | 2–1 | |

Source: JPL
Legend: Blue = home team win; Yellow = draw; Red = away team win.

==== Matches 27-39 ====
| Home \ Away | ARN | CAV | CHA | DUN | HAR | HUM | MBU | MOL | MTP | POR | TIV | RAC | VER | WAT |
|---|---|---|---|---|---|---|---|---|---|---|---|---|---|---|
| Arnett Gardens | | | 5–0 | 4–1 | | | | | | | | 2–2 | | |
| Cavalier | | | | 1–0 | | | | | | | | | | |
| Chapelton Maroons | | | | | | 2–1 | 0–1 | | 0–2 | | | | | |
| Dunbeholden | | | | | | | | | 0–3 | | 2–4 | | | |
| Harbour View | | | 3–0 | | | | | 0–0 | | 0–2 | | | | |
| Humble Lions | | 3–1 | | | 1–0 | | | | | | 3–2 | | | |
| Montego Bay United | 2–2 | | | | 1–0 | | | 5–0 | | | | | | |
| Molynes United | 0–4 | | 1–1 | | | | | | | | | | 3–2 | |
| Mount Pleasant | | | | | | | | | | | | | | 1–0 |
| Portmore United | | | | | | | | | 1–0 | | 1–1 | | 1–0 | |
| Tivoli Gardens | | | | | | | | 3–0 | | | | | | 3–2 |
| Racing United | | | | 1–0 | | | 0–3 | | | | | | | |
| Vere United | | | | | | 2–0 | 1–2 | | | | | | | |
| Waterhouse | | 1–1 | | | | 1–0 | | | | | | 0–3 | 2–1 | |

Updated to match(es) played on 14 April 2025. Source: JPL
Legend: Blue = home team win; Yellow = draw; Red = away team win.

== Season Statistics ==
=== Top Scorers ===
| Rank | Player | Club | Goals |
|---|---|---|---|
| 1 | (Jamaica) Warner Brown | Arnett Gardens | 18 |
| 2 | (Antigua and Barbuda) Jalmaro Calvin | Cavalier | 14 |
| 3 | (Jamaica) Shaqueil Bradford | Mount Pleasant | 12 |
| 3 | (Jamaica) Daniel Green | Mount Pleasant | 12 |
| 3 | (Jamaica) Shaniel Thomas | Montego Bay United | 12 |

=== Hat-tricks ===
| Date | Player | Club | Match Result | Scored Against |
|---|---|---|---|---|
| 29 December 2024 | (Jamaica) Devonte Davis | Molynes United | 5–0 | Vere United |
| 19 January 2025 | (Jamaica) Tedj Bryan | Portmore United | 4–0 | Harbour View |
| 3 February 2025 | (Jamaica) Warner Brown | Arnett Gardens | 5–3 | Tivoli Gardens |
| 17 February 2025 | (Jamaica) Daniel Green | Mount Pleasant | 5–0 | Humble Lions |
| 20 March 2025 | (Jamaica) Jourdaine Fletcher | Montego Bay United | 5–0 | Molynes United |

== Attendances ==
The average league attendance was 169:

| # | Club | Average |
|---|---|---|
| 1 | Mount Pleasant | 242 |
| 2 | Arnett Gardens | 231 |
| 3 | Cavalier | 224 |
| 4 | Montego Bay United | 218 |
| 5 | Portmore United | 198 |
| 6 | Tivoli Gardens | 187 |
| 7 | Waterhouse | 173 |
| 8 | Racing United | 159 |
| 9 | Chapelton Maroons | 142 |
| 10 | Dunbeholden | 133 |
| 11 | Harbour View | 128 |
| 12 | Molynes United | 119 |
| 13 | Humble Lions | 112 |
| 14 | Vere United | 104 |
