= 2025–26 Jamaica Premier League =

Jamaican football league

Jamaica Premier League
- Season: 2025–26
- Dates: 15 September 2025 – 23 May 2026
- Champions: Portmore United
- Relegated: Harbour View; Spanish Town Police
- CONCACAF Caribbean Cup: Portmore United; Cavalier
- CFU Club Shield: Mount Pleasant
- Matches: 247
- All statistics correct as of 12 March 2026.

The 2025–26 Jamaica Premier League is the 52st season of the top-tier football league in Jamaica. The season began on September 15, 2025, suspended on October 23 due to Hurricane Melissa, resumed December 7, 2025 and final scheduled for May 2026.

The season was scheduled with three rounds of preliminary games, returning to its pre-COVID structure. The return to three rounds increased the number of games each team played from 26 to 39 regular-season matches, followed by the playoffs.

== Teams ==
Fourteen teams are competing in the league — the top twelve teams from the previous season and two promoted teams from the second division.

Location of teams in the 2025–26 Jamaica Premier League

Pos.	Relegated from 2024-25 Premier League
13th	Humble Lion
14th	Vere United F.C.

Pos.	Promoted from 2024-25 JFF Championship
Winners	Spanish Town Police
Runner-up	Racing United

=== Stadiums and locations ===
Team	Location	Stadium	Stadium Capacity
Arnett Gardens	Kingston	Anthony Spaulding Sports Complex	6,000
Cavalier	Kingston	Stadium East	3,000
Chapelton Maroons	Chapelton	Anthony Spaulding Sports Complex	6,000
Dunbeholden	Portmore	Dunbeholden Sports Complex	1,500
Harbour View	Kingston	Harbour View Stadium	7,000
Molynes United	Kingston	Jasceria Park Recreational Center	1,500
Montego Bay United	Montego Bay	Catherine Hall Sports Complex	7,000
Mount Pleasant	Runaway Bay	Draxhall Sports Complex	3,500
Portmore United	Portmore	Ferdie Neita Sports Complex	3,000
Racing United	Portmore	Ferdie Neita Sports Complex	3,000
Spanish Town Police F.C.	Spanish Town	Spanish Town Prison Oval	3,500
Treasure Beach F.C.	Treasure Beach	STEHS	1,200
Tivoli Gardens	Kingston	Edward Seaga Sports Complex	5,000
Waterhouse	Kingston	Waterhouse Mini Stadium	5,000

Source: Jamaica Premier League

== Personnel and kits ==
Team	Manager	Captain	Shirt Sponsor (chest)	Kit Manufacturer
Arnett Gardens	(Jamaica) TBA	(Jamaica) Fabian Reid	iCool Water	Admiral Sportswear
Cavalier	(Jamaica) Rudolph Speid	(Jamaica) TBA	Foska Oats	Admiral Sportswear
Chapelton Maroons	(Jamaica) Vassell Reynolds	(Jamaica) Gawain Austin	n/a	Admiral Sportswear
Dunbeholden	(Jamaica) Harold Thomas	(Jamaica) Fabian McCarthy	National Commercial Bank of Jamaica	Admiral Sportswear
Harbour View	(Jamaica) Donald Stewart	(Jamaica) Garth Stewart	VM Group Limited	Admiral Sportswear
Molynes United	(Jamaica) Jermaine Thomas	(Jamaica) Jason Wright	n/a	Admiral Sportswear
Montego Bay United	(Jamaica) Xavier Gilbert	(Jamaica) Owayne Gordon	Sunshine Snacks	Admiral Sportswear
Mount Pleasant	(Jamaica) Theodore Whitmore	(Jamaica) TBA	Powerade	Admiral Sportswear
Portmore United	(Jamaica) Rodolph Austin	(Jamaica) Seigle Knight	Kemtek Development & Construction Limited	Admiral Sportswear
Racing United	(Jamaica) Anthony Patrick	(Jamaica) Marcovich Brown	Pepsi	Admiral Sportswear
Spanish Town Police	(Jamaica) TBA	(Jamaica) TBA		Admiral Sportswear
Tivoli Gardens	(Jamaica) Jerome Waite	(Jamaica) Barrington Pryce	JN Money	Admiral Sportswear
Treasure Beach F.C.	(Jamaica) TBA	(Jamaica) TBA		Admiral Sportswear
Waterhouse	(Jamaica) Marcel Gayle	(Jamaica) Kemar Foster	Bert's Auto Parts	Admiral Sportswear

Source: Jamaica Premier League, Admiral - Jamaica Premier League Store

=== Managerial changes ===
Team	Outgoing Manager	Manner of Departure	Date of Vacancy	Incoming Manager	Date of Appointment

== Foreign Players ==
The clubs can have a maximum of six foreign players in their Jamaica Premier League squads per match, but there is no limit of foreigners in the clubs' squads.

- To be Updated
- Players marked in **bold** indicate they were registered during mid-season transfer window.
- Players marked in italics indicate they had left their respective clubs during mid-season transfer window.

Club	Player 1	Player 2	Player 3	Player 4	Player 5	Player 6	Player 7	Former Players
Arnett Gardens								
Cavalier	(Saint Lucia) Vino Barclett	(Suriname) Shaquille Stein	(Trinidad and Tobago) Kaïlé Auvray	**(Haiti) Shad San Milan**	**(Suriname) Jamilhio Rigters**			(Saint Lucia) Darren Donaie
Chapelton Maroons	(Brazil) Willian	(Saint Lucia) Shanoi Evnas						
Dunbeholden								
Harbour View	(Suriname) Demelcio Fer	(Nigeria) Chidalu Chukwuemeka	(Saint Lucia) Alvinus Myers	(Dominica) Javid George				
Molynes United	**(Saint Lucia) Darren Donaie**	**(Saint Lucia) Dante Fitz**						
Montego Bay United	(Trinidad and Tobago) Aaron Enill	(Trinidad and Tobago) Jordan Britto	(Trinidad and Tobago) Darnell Hospedales	(Brazil) Lucas Lima	(Trinidad and Tobago) Josiah Trimmingham	**(Brazil) Jean Claudio Ferreira**	**(Trinidad and Tobago) Che Benny**	
Mount Pleasant	(Haiti) Celestine Franco	**(Saint Lucia) Melvin Doxilly**	**(United States) Cooper Nugent**	**(Haiti) Clifford Thomas**				(Haiti) Shad San Milan, (Brazil) Jean Claudio Ferreira, (Cameroon) Wilfried Rayonne, (Trinidad and Tobago) Nathaniel James, (Panama) Jonathan Cecena
Portmore United	(Canada) Zion Richards							
Racing United								
Spanish Town Police								
Tivoli Gardens								
Waterhouse	(Guyana) Kvist Paul	**(Barbados) Omani Leacock**						

=== Dual nationality ===
Players who are Jamaican nationals but also hold dual citizenship or represent another FIFA nation in international football are not regarded as foreign players and do not take up a foreign player slot.

- (Antigua and Barbuda) Jalmaro Calvin (Cavalier)
- (Guyana) Romaine Brackenridge (Harbour View)

== Regular season ==
=== League table ===
Pos	Team	Pld	W	D	L	GF	GA	GD	Pts	Qualification or relegation
1	Mount Pleasant (Q)	39	20	13	6	69	25	+44	73	Advance to Playoffs (Semifinals)
2	Montego Bay United (Q)	39	21	8	10	79	45	+34	71	Advance to Playoffs (Semifinals)
3	Portmore United (Q)	39	17	14	8	54	35	+19	65	Advance to Playoffs (Quarterfinals)
4	Waterhouse (Q)	39	19	8	12	51	32	+19	65	Advance to Playoffs (Quarterfinals)
5	Cavalier (Q)	39	19	4	16	57	41	+16	61	Advance to Playoffs (Quarterfinals)
6	Racing United (Q)	39	14	17	8	53	34	+19	59	Advance to Playoffs (Quarterfinals)
7	Arnett Gardens	39	17	7	15	68	46	+22	58	
8	Chapelton Maroons	39	14	7	18	42	57	−15	49	
9	Dunbeholden	39	13	9	17	40	53	−13	48	
10	Tivoli Gardens	39	11	11	17	37	58	−21	44	
11	Treasure Beach F.C.	39	10	13	16	43	59	−16	43	
12	Molynes United	39	9	15	15	45	47	−2	42	
13	Harbour View (R)	39	9	11	19	53	73	−20	38	Relegation to JFF Championship
14	Spanish Town Police (R)	39	7	5	27	25	111	−86	26	Relegation to JFF Championship

Source: JPL
(Q) Qualified for the phase indicated; (R) Relegated

=== Results ===
==== Matches 1-26 ====
Home \ Away	ARN	CAV	CHA	DUN	HAR	MBU	MOL	MTP	POR	TBF	TIV	RAC	STP	WAT
Arnett Gardens		2–3	1–0	1–0	2–0	0–1	0–0	0–1	0–2	0–1	1–2	1–1	1–2	2–1
Cavalier	0–3		1–0	5–1	0–0	3–0	2–1	0–1	2–4	2–1	1–2	1–4	5–0	0–1
Chapelton Maroons	3–0	0–3		2–0	2–1	1–2	1–0	0–2	3–2	2–0	2–1	0–0	0–0	0–1
Dunbeholden	1–1	1–0	0–0		4–2	1–2	1–1	0–0	0–2	4–2	1–0	0–0	0–2	1–2
Harbour View	2–5	0–1	0–2	1–0		2–2	2–2	1–0	1–2	3–4	2–2	0–3	5–2	1–1
Montego Bay United	1–1	1–0	2–0	1–0	4–4		3–0	0–1	0–0	3–1	3–1	3–1	4–0	0–1
Molynes United	3–1	1–0	0–0	0–2	2–2	0–2		0–0	0–0	1–2	3–2	0–1	1–1	0–2
Mount Pleasant	1–0	2–1	3–1	4–0	4–1	2–2	1–1		1–1	0–0	5–0	1–1	5–0	0–1
Portmore United	1–0	1–0	0–0	0–0	4–1	2–0	1–1	0–2		1–1	0–0	0–0	4–0	0–1
Treasure Beach	1–1	1–1	0–1	0–4	1–1	1–2	2–2	0–0	2–0		4–2	2–4	2–0	0–0
Tivoli Gardens	0–2	0–2	2–0	2–1	2–1	0–1	1–1	1–1	2–2	0–0		0–0	2–1	2–1
Racing United	5–1	0–1	3–0	1–1	0–0	1–1	3–2	1–0	1–1	4–1	0–0		3–0	0–0
Spanish Town Police	2–10	0–3	0–1	0–1	1–0	0–5	2–2	1–0	0–1	0–0	0–1	1–3		2–1
Waterhouse	0–1	0–0	3–1	1–0	1–2	1–0	0–2	1–1	1–2	1–0	1–1	1–2	3–0	

Source: JPL
Legend: Blue = home team win; Yellow = draw; Red = away team win.

==== Matches 27-39 ====
Home \ Away	ARN	CAV	CHA	DUN	HAR	MBU	MOL	MTP	POR	RAC	STP	TBF	TIV	WAT
Arnett Gardens											6–0			
Cavalier					2–1					2–0				
Chapelton Maroons	2–7	1–4									6–2			
Dunbeholden	2–1							0–5						
Harbour View						4–3						2–1		
Montego Bay United											6–0	0–2		
Molynes United					0–1				0–1				2–0	
Mount Pleasant						2–1								
Portmore United	1–2												3–0	
Racing United									1–1					0–1
Spanish Town Police										0–4				
Treasure Beach				1–0			0–2							
Tivoli Gardens		0–2						1–0						
Waterhouse			3–0	4–0										

Updated to match(es) played on 14 April 2026. Source: JPL
Legend: Blue = home team win; Yellow = draw; Red = away team win.

== Playoffs ==
=== Bracket ===
Quarterfinals
6	Racing United	3	0	3
3	Portmore United	3	2	5
5	Waterhouse	2	0	2
4	Cavalier	2	2	4

Semifinals
3	Portmore United	0	4	4
1	Mount Pleasant	1	2	3
3	Cavalier	0	2	2
2	Montego Bay United F.C.	1	0	1

Finals
Portmore United F.C.	5 (Pks)
Cavalier	3
3rd place match
Mount Pleasant	3
Montego Bay United F.C.	2

=== Results ===
==== Quarter finals ====
10 May 2026
First Leg

Racing United	3–3	Portmore United
	Report

National Stadium, Kingston
13 May 2026
Second Leg

Portmore United	2–0	Racing United

National Stadium, Kingston

TBA

10 May 2026
First Leg

Waterhouse	2–2	Cavalier

National Stadium, Kingston
13 May 2026
Second Leg

Cavalier	2–0	Waterhouse

National Stadium, Kingston

TBA

==== Semi-finals ====
17 May 2026
First Leg

Portmore United	0–2	Mount Pleasant

National Stadium, Kingston
20 May 2024
Second Leg

Mount Pleasant	1–4	Portmore United
	Report

National Stadium, Kingston

TBA

17 May 2026
First Leg

Cavalier	0–1	Montego Bay United

National Stadium, Kingston
20 May 2026
Second Leg

Montego Bay United	0–2	Cavalier
		Kimarly Scott 54' , Kimarly Scott 97'

National Stadium, Kingston

Cavalier advances to the finals 2-1 on agg

==== Third place playoff ====
May 24, 2026

Mount Pleasant	3–2	Montego Bay United F.C.
	Report

Independence Park, Kingston

==== Jamaica Premier League Finals ====
May 24, 2026

Cavalier	3 (3)–3 (5 pks)	Portmore United
	Report

Independence Park, Kingston

== Season statistics ==
=== Top scorers ===
Rank	Player	Club	Goals
1	(Jamaica) Raheem Edwards	Mount Pleasant FA	23
2	(Jamaica) Trayvone Reid	Harbour View F.C.	21
3	(Jamaica) Fabian Reid	Arnett Gardens F.C.	18
4	(Jamaica) Rohan Brown	Arnett Gardens F.C.	17
4	(Jamaica) Tajay Ajani Grant	Racing United F.C.	17

=== Hat-tricks ===
Date	Player	Club	Match Result	Scored Against
March 2026	(Jamaica) Jabarie Howell	Mount Pleasant F.A.	3–1	Vere United
March 2026	(Jamaica) Giovanni Taylor	Arnett Gardens F.C.	4–0	Harbour View

== Attendances ==
The average league attendance was TBA;

#	Club	Average
1	Mount Pleasant	
2	Arnett Gardens	
3	Cavalier	
4	Montego Bay United	
5	Portmore United	
6	Tivoli Gardens	
7	Waterhouse	
8	Racing United	
9	Chapelton Maroons	
10	Dunbeholden	
11	Harbour View	
12	Molynes United	
13	Spanish Town Police	
14	Treasure Beach F.C.	
