= 2022–23 Jamaica Premier League =

Jamaican football league

Jamaica Premier League
- Season: 2022–23
- Dates: 23 October 2022 – 11 July 2023
- Champions: Mount Pleasant (1st title)
- Relegated: Faulkland; Chapelton Maroons
- Matches: 188
- Goals: 475 (2.53 per match)
- Top goalscorer: (Jamaica) Collin Anderson (20 goals)
- Biggest home win: 7 goals: Mount Pleasant 7—0 Chapelton Maroons
- Biggest away win: 6 goals: Chapelton Maroons 1—7 Dunbeholden
- Highest scoring: 8 goals: Chapelton Maroons 1—7 Dunbeholden; Faulkland 4—4 Chapelton Maroons

The 2022–23 Jamaica Premier League was the 49th season of the Jamaica Premier League, the top division football competition in Jamaica. The season kicked off on 23 October 2022 and ended on 11 July 2023.

Harbour View were the defending champions, having won their 5th premier league title, their first since the 2012-13 season. Mount Pleasant defeated Cavalier in the playoff finals to win their first premier league title.

== Teams ==
There were no relegations at the end of the 2022 season due to the expansion of the league from 12 to 14 teams for the 2022-23 season. Chapelton Maroons and Faulkland were promoted from the second division. Both were making their debut in Jamaica's top flight football league.

Location of teams in the 2022–23 Jamaica Premier League

=== Stadiums and locations ===
Team	Location	Stadium	Capacity	Manager
Arnett Gardens	Kingston	Anthony Spaulding Sports Complex	7,000	(Jamaica) Paul Davis
Cavalier	Kingston	Stadium East	2,000	(Jamaica) Rudolph Speid
Chapleton Maroons	Chapleton	Anthony Spaulding Sports Complex	2,200	(Jamaica) Lenworth Hyde
Dunbeholden	Portmore	Prison Oval	2,000	(Jamaica) Harold Thomas
Faulkland	Montego Bay, Jamaica	WespoW Park	2000	(Jamaica) Gregory Palmer
Harbour View	Kingston	Harbour View Mini Stadium	7,000	(Jamaica) Ludlow Bernard
Humble Lions	Clarendon	Effortville Community Centre	1,000	(Jamaica) Andrew Price
Montego Bay United	St. James	Montego Bay Sports Complex	7,000	(Jamaica) Donovan Duckie
Molynes United	Kingston	Jacisera Park		(Jamaica) Alex Thomas
Mount Pleasant	Runaway Bay, St. Ann	Drax Hall Sports Complex, Drax Hall	2,000	(Jamaica) Theodore Whitmore
Portmore United	Portmore	Ferdie Neita Sports Complex	3,000	(Jamaica) Phillip Williams
Tivoli Gardens	Kingston	Railway Oval	3,000	(Jamaica) Jermaine Johnson
Vere United	Clarendon	Wembley Centre of Excellence		(Jamaica) Linval Dixon
Waterhouse	Kingston	Waterhouse Stadium	5,000	(Jamaica) Marcel Gayle

== Regular season ==
=== League table ===
Pos	Team	Pld	W	D	L	GF	GA	GD	Pts	Qualification or relegation
1	Arnett Gardens	26	16	7	3	48	21	+27	55	Advance to Playoffs (Semifinals)
2	Cavalier	26	16	4	6	47	24	+23	52	Advance to Playoffs (Semifinals)
3	Mount Pleasant (C)	26	12	10	4	48	19	+29	46	Advance to Playoffs (Quarterfinals)
4	Harbour View	26	12	8	6	34	21	+13	44	Advance to Playoffs (Quarterfinals)
5	Humble Lions	26	11	9	6	27	15	+12	42	Advance to Playoffs (Quarterfinals)
6	Dunbeholden	26	12	5	9	44	31	+13	41	Advance to Playoffs (Quarterfinals)
7	Portmore United	26	9	13	4	19	17	+2	40	
8	Waterhouse	26	11	6	9	41	18	+23	39	
9	Molynes United	26	8	6	12	37	48	−11	30	
10	Montego Bay United	26	5	11	10	22	40	−18	26	
11	Tivoli Gardens	26	5	7	14	29	42	−13	22	
12	Vere United	26	3	12	11	15	32	−17	21	
13	Faulkland (R)	26	1	10	15	23	55	−32	13	Relegated to JFF Tier II
14	Chapelton Maroons (R)	26	3	6	17	14	62	−48	9	Relegated to JFF Tier II

Updated to match(es) played on 11 July 2023. Source:
(C) Champions; (R) Relegated
Note
- Chapelton Maroons were deducted -6 points for failure to appear in match day 11.
- Cavalier and Waterhouse were both awarded 0-3 losses, and deducted -3 points each, for fielding suspended players in match day 24. The match originally ended 1-0 to Watherhourse.

=== Results ===
Home \ Away	ARN	CAV	CHA	DUN	FAU	HAR	HUM	MBU	MOL	MTP	POR	TIV	VER	WAT
Arnett Gardens	—	2–1	3–0	1–0	0–0	3–0	0–1	1–1	2–1	3–2	1–1	4–1	1–1	1–0
Cavalier	1–2	—	4–1	3–1	4–0	1–2	1–0	0–0	4–2	0–1	2–0	3–0	1–0	0–1
Chapelton Maroons	0–5	0–3	—	1–7	0–1	0–2	0–3	0–0	1–0	0–3	0–1	2–0	0–4	2–3
Dunbeholden	4–2	1–2	0–0	—	4–2	1–4	1–2	4–0	0–1	1–1	1–3	4–1	3–1	0–0
Faulkland	0–2	2–2	4–4	0–2	—	1–5	0–0	0–1	2–2	0–0	1–3	2–2	0–1	2–3
Harbour View	0–1	1–1	1–0	2–0	6–1	—	1–0	1–0	1–1	1–1	0–1	2–2	0–0	0–4
Humble Lions	1–1	1–2	4–0	0–0	2–0	0–1	—	0–0	2–1	1–1	1–0	1–0	2–0	0–0
Montego Bay United	2–1	1–2	1–1	0–2	2–1	0–1	0–1	—	2–2	2–2	1–1	0–3	3–3	1–0
Molynes United	1–5	0–2	3–1	2–3	2–2	0–0	3–2	0–1	—	0–5	0–3	4–3	1–0	2–1
Mount Pleasant	0–0	2–2	7–0	3–0	2–1	0–0	1–0	5–1	1–2	—	0–0	3–1	0–0	1–0
Portmore United	1–2	1–2	0–0	0–0	4–0	1–0	1–1	1–1	1–1	0–0	—	2–1	0–0	1–1
Tivoli Gardens	1–2	0–1	3–0	0–2	0–0	1–1	1–2	5–2	2–1	0–2	0–0	—	0–0	0–1
Vere United	1–1	0–3	0–0	0–1	1–1	1–0	0–0	0–0	0–4	0–5	0–2	1–1	—	0–1
Waterhouse	0–2	0–0	0–1	0–0	1–0	0–2	0–0	3–0	2–1	2–0	1–1	0–1	2–1	—

Updated to match(es) played on 11 June 2023. Source:
Legend: Blue = home team win; Yellow = draw; Red = away team win.

== Playoffs ==
=== Bracket ===
Quarterfinals
6	Dunbeholden	1	0	1
3	Mount Pleasant	1	3	4
5	Humble Lions	0	3	3
4	Harbour View	2	2	4

Semifinals
3	Mount Pleasant	2	3	5
1	Arnett Gardens	2	1	3
4	Harbour View	0	0	0
2	Cavalier	1	2	3

Finals
Mount Pleasant	2
Cavalier	1
3rd place match
Arnett Gardens	1
Harbour View	0

=== Results ===
==== Quarter finals ====
15 May 2023
First Leg

Dunbeholden	1–1	Mount Pleasant
S. Barnett 53'	Report	L. Rankine 90+7'

Sabina Park, Kingston
Referee: (Jamaica) D. Parchment
22 May 2023
21:00 EST(UTC-05:00)
Second Leg

Mount Pleasant	3–0	Dunbeholden
L. Rankine 49', 60'; A. Bygrave 86'	Report

Sabina Park, Kingston
Referee: (Jamaica) O. Nicholson

Mount Pleasant won 4-1 on aggregate, advanced to the semi-finals.

15 May 2023
20:30 EST(UTC-05:00)
First Leg

Humble Lions	0–2	Harbour View
	Report	O. Harding 23'; R. Wellington 76'

Sabina Park, Kingston
Referee: (Jamaica) O. Hamilton
22 May 2023
Second Leg

Harbour View	2–3	Humble Lions
C. Daley 10'; R. Wellington 78'	Report	A. Clennon 45+2'; R. Sharpe 57'; J. Smith 66'

Sabina Park, Kingston
Referee: (Jamaica) S. Dewar

Harbour View won 4-3 on aggregate, advanced to semi-finals.

==== Semi-finals ====
29 May 2023
First Leg

Harbour View	0–1	Cavalier
	Report	O. Russell 51'

Sabina Park, Kingston
Referee: (Jamaica) N. Goldson
4 June 2023
21:00 EST (UTC-05:00)
Second Leg

Cavalier	2–0	Harbour View
C. Anderson 11', 57'	Report

Sabina Park, Kingston
Referee: (Jamaica) C. Mason

Cavalier won 3-0 on aggregate, advanced to JPL Finals.

29 May 2023
20:30 EST(UTC-05:00)
First Leg

Mount Pleasant	2–2	Arnett Gardens
L. Rankine 17'; T. Stewart 63'	Report	S. Smith 30'; F. Reid 66'

Sabina Park, Kingston
Referee: (Jamaica) A. Perry
4 June 2023
Second Leg

Arnett Gardens	1–3	Mount Pleasant
D. Cunningham 15'	Report	T. Stewart 33', 40'; S. James 86'

Sabina Park, Kingston
Referee: (Jamaica) S. Dewar

Mount Pleasant won 5-3 on aggregate, advanced to JPL Finals.

==== Third place playoff ====
June 11, 2023
16:00 EST(UTC-05:00)

Arnett Gardens	1–0 (a.e.t.)	Harbour View
O. Harding (OG) 96'	Report

Sabina Park, Kingston
Referee: (Jamaica) A. Perry

==== Jamaica Premier League Finals ====
11 June 2023
20:00 EST (UTC-05:00)

Mount Pleasant	2–1	Cavalier
S. McCalla 8', 89'	Report	C. Anderson 83'

Sabina Park, Kingston
Referee: (Jamaica) O. Nicholson

== Champions ==
Jamaica Premier League Champions

1st title

== Season statistics ==
=== Top scorers ===
Rank	Scorer	Team	Goals
1	(Jamaica) Collin Anderson	Cavalier	20
2	(Jamaica) Trivante Stewart	Mount Pleasant	18
3	(Jamaica) Fabian Reid	Arnett Gardens	16
4	(Jamaica) Jason Wright	Molynes United	14
5	(Jamaica) Dwayne Atkinson	Cavalier	9
5	(Jamaica) Shaqueil Bradford	Waterhouse	9
5	(Jamaica) Stephen Barnett	Dunbeholden	9
8	(Jamaica) Alian Ottey	Montego Bay United	8
8	(Jamaica) Chevaughn Walsh	Portmore United	8
10	(Jamaica) Ajuma Johnson	Arnett Gardens	7
10	(Jamaica) Nicholas Nelson	Molynes United	7
10	(Jamaica) Atapharoy Bygrave	Mount Pleasant	7
13	(Jamaica) Nicholas Hamilton	Harbour View	6
13	(Jamaica) Timar Lewis	Harbour View	6
13	(Jamaica) Ricardo Morris	Mount Pleasant	6
13	(Jamaica) Colorado Murray	Harbour View	6
13	(Jamaica) Andrew Vanzie	Humble Lions	6
