= Jamaica national under-20 football team =

National association football team

Jamaica Under-20
- Nickname: The Reggae Boyz
- Association: Jamaica Football Federation
- Confederation: CONCACAF (North America)
- Sub-confederation: CFU (Caribbean)
- Head coach: Rodolph Austin
| First colours | Second colours |

FIFA U-20 World Cup
- Appearances: 1 (first in 2001)
- Best result: Group stage (2001)

The Jamaica national under-20 football team is the national under-20 football team representing Jamaica and is controlled by the Jamaica Football Federation. The team qualified for the FIFA U-20 World Cup in 2001, and was second placed in the Pan American Games in 2007. It has also taken part in the CONCACAF Under-20 Championship and the CFU U-20 Tournament.

== Qualification history ==
- 2001: Qualified for 2001 FIFA World Youth Championship
- 2003: Eliminated in CFU qualifying
- 2005: Eliminated 4th in Group B in CONCACAF Final round
- 2007: Eliminated 4th in Group 1 in CONCACAF Final round
- 2009: Eliminated 3rd in Group B in CONCACAF Final round
- 2011: Eliminated 3rd in Group A in CONCACAF Final round
- 2013: Eliminated in quarterfinals in CONCACAF Final round
- 2015: Eliminated 4th in Group A in CONCACAF Final round
- 2017: Eliminated in CFU First round
- 2018: Eliminated 2nd in Group B in CONCACAF Final round
- 2020: Cancelled due to COVID-19
- 2022: Eliminated in quarterfinals in CONCACAF Final round
- 2024: Eliminated 4th in Group A in CONCACAF Final round
- 2026: Eliminated Quarterfinal round of CONCACAF Final round

== Honors ==
- Pan American Games:
  - Runner-up (1): 2007

== Upcoming schedule ==
| 5 August 2026 2026 CONCACAF U-20 Championship | Canada | 3–1 (a.e.t.) | Jamaica | Puebla, Mexico |
| 16:30 | Mackenzie 57', 94' (pen.); Vogele 116' | Report | Nolan 87' (pen.) | Stadium: Estadio Cuauhtémoc; Referee: Ismael López (Mexico) |

| 1 August 2026 2026 CONCACAF U-20 Championship | Canada | 2 – 2 | Jamaica | Puebla, Mexico |
| 14:00 | Sedin 56'; Aiyenero 79' (pen.) | Report | Nolan 21'; Leighton 90+12' (pen.) | Stadium: Estadio Universitario BUAP; Referee: Guido Gonzales Jr (United States) |

| 29 July 2026 2026 CONCACAF U-20 Championship | Jamaica | 2 – 2 | Panama | Puebla, Mexico |
| 14:00 | Nolan 62'; Brown 90+6' | Report | Richards 13'; Gordón 22' | Stadium: Estadio Universitario BUAP; Referee: Waldir García (El Salvador) |

| 26 July 2026 2026 CONCACAF U-20 Championship | Honduras | 1–2 | Jamaica | Puebla, Mexico |
| | Salazar 75' | Report | Nolan 22'; Bent 90+5' | Stadium: Estadio Universitario BUAP; Referee: Cristhofer Corado (Guatemala) |

| 3 March 2026 2026 CONCACAF U-20 Championship qualifying | Jamaica | 1–0 | Puerto Rico | Stadion Rignaal 'Jean' Francisca, Willemstad |
| 19:00 | Howell 32' | Report |

| 1 March 2026 2026 CONCACAF U-20 Championship qualifying | Jamaica | 8–0 | Saint Kitts and Nevis | Stadion Rignaal 'Jean' Francisca, Willemstad |
| 19:00 | Leighton 9', 60'; Howell 11'; Nolan 31' (pen.); Campbell-Dennis 52' (pen.); Dennis 67', 90+3'; Miller 73' |

| 27 February 2026 2026 CONCACAF U-20 Championship qualifying | Cayman Islands | 0–9 | Jamaica | Stadion Rignaal 'Jean' Francisca, Willemstad |
| 19:00 | | Report | Wilberforce 19'; Taylor 28' (pen.), 33'; Miller 52'; Nugent 71'; Nolan 79', 90', 90+3'; Howell 88' | Referee: Josué Ugalde (Costa Rica) |

| 25 February 2026 2026 CONCACAF U-20 Championship qualifying | Turks and Caicos Islands | 0 - 7 | Jamaica | Stadion Rignaal 'Jean' Francisca, Willemstad,Curacao |
| 19:00 | | | Campbell-Dennis 10', 13'; Nolan 19'; Howell 30'; Taylor 61', 87'; Miller 82' | Referee: Patrick Senecharles (Haiti) |

| 23 February 2026 2026 CONCACAF U-20 Championship qualifying | Jamaica | 3 -0 | Bonaire | Stadion Rignaal 'Jean' Francisca, Willemstad, Curacao |
| 19:00 | Leighton 25'; Talbert 43'; Campbel-Dennis 71' | Report | | Referee: Andrew Samuel (Trinidad and Tobago) |

== Players ==
=== Current squad ===
- The following players were called up for the 2026 CONCACAF U-20 Championship.
- Match dates: 25 July – 5 August 2026
- Caps and goals correct as of: 6 August 2026, after match against Canada
- Names in italics denote players who have been capped for the senior team.

| No. | Pos. | Player | Date of birth (age) | Caps | Goals | Club |
|---|---|---|---|---|---|---|
| 1 | GK | Joshua Grant | 27 May 2007 (age 19) | 8 | 0 | (United States Soccer Federation) FC Naples |
| 13 | GK | Johnoi Steadman | 31 December 2008 (age 17) | 1 | 0 | (Jamaica Football Federation) St. Elizabeth Technical High School |
| 21 | GK | Justin Murray | 15 April 2008 (age 18) | 1 | 0 | (Jamaica Football Federation) Glenmuir High School |
| 2 | DF | Demario McIntosh | 17 August 2007 (age 19) | 0 | 0 | (United States Soccer Federation) New England Revolution |
| 3 | DF | Jaquan Brown | 6 May 2007 (age 19) | 6 | 1 | (Jamaica Football Federation) Portmore United F.C. |
| 4 | DF | Dante Plunkett | 9 October 2007 (age 19) | 3 | 0 | (The Football Association) Manchester United F.C. |
| 14 | DF | Duwayne Burgher | 7 July 2009 (age 17) | 7 | 0 | (Jamaica Football Federation) Waterhouse F.C. |
| 16 | DF | Raequan Campbell-Dennis | 30 January 2008 (age 18) | 3 | 0 | (Canadian Soccer Association) Toronto FC Academy |
| 18 | DF | Brandon Bent | 24 January 2008 (age 18) | 5 | 1 | (United States Soccer Federation) Miami F.C. |
| 6 | MF | Owen Jumpp | 1 September 2007 (age 19) | 4 | 0 | (Jamaica Football Federation) Mount Pleasant Football Academy |
| 8 | MF | Jermaine Young | 2 June 2007 (age 19) | 4 | 0 | (Portuguese Football Federation) Casa Pia A.C. |
| 10 | MF | Jabarie Howell | 2 December 2007 (age 18) | 8 | 4 | (Jamaica Football Federation) Mount Pleasant Football Academy |
| 11 | MF | Jahmani Bell | 11 October 2007 (age 19) | 6 | 0 | (United States Soccer Federation) Houston Dynamo |
| 17 | MF | Santana Headley | 4 October 2007 (age 19) | 4 | 0 | (Jamaica Football Federation) Portmore United F.C. |
| 18 | MF | Kimarly Scott | 23 May 2007 (age 19) | 4 | 0 | (Jamaica Football Federation) Cavalier F.C. |
| 20 | MF | Che Gardner | 26 May 2007 (age 19) | 2 | 0 | (The Football Association) Stockport County F.C. |
| 5 | FW | Cai McClean | 27 June 2008 (age 18) | 4 | 1 | (United States Soccer Federation) Inter Miami C.F. |
| 9 | FW | Giovanni Taylor | 9 January 2008 (age 18) | 6 | 2 | (Jamaica Football Federation) Arnett Gardens F.C. |
| 7 | FW | Jahmarie Nolan | 11 November 2009 (age 16) | 9 | 9 | (Canadian Soccer Association) Toronto F.C. |
| 12 | FW | Sean Leighton | 17 September 2008 (age 18) | 7 | 3 | (Jamaica Football Federation) Chapelton Maroons F.C. |
| 15 | FW | Jamone Lyle | 10 July 2009 (age 17) | 8 | 2 | (Jamaica Football Federation) Waterhouse F.C. |

=== Technical staff ===
- Head Coach: Rodolph Austin (Jamaica)
- Asst. Coach: TBA (Jamaica)
- Goalkeeper Coach: TBA (Jamaica)
- Technical Director: Wendell Downswell (Jamaica)

== Previous results ==
The following is a list of matches played in the last 3 U-20 cycles as well as any games scheduled to take place in the future.

== Previous U20 players and staff ==
=== 2024 CONCACAF final round squad ===
- The following players were called up for the 2024 CONCACAF U-20 Championship.
- Caps and goals correct as of: 28 February 2024, after match against Bermuda
- Names in italics denote players who have been capped for the senior team.

| No. | Pos. | Player | Date of birth (age) | Caps | Goals | Club |
|---|---|---|---|---|---|---|
| 1 | GK | Joshua Grant | 27 May 2007 (age 19) | 2 | 0 | (United States Soccer Federation) New York Red Bulls II |
| 13 | GK | Taywane Lynch | 19 January 2006 (age 20) | 1 | 0 | (Jamaica Football Federation) Mount Pleasant |
| 2 | DF | Javin Williams | 4 April 2006 (age 20) | 0 | 0 | (Jamaica Football Federation) Reno |
| 3 | DF | Nahshon Bolt-Barrett | 19 May 2006 (age 20) | 1 | 0 | (Jamaica Football Federation) Arnett Gardens |
| 4 | DF | Romain Blake | 14 July 2005 (age 21) | 4 | 0 | (United States Soccer Federation) Chicago Fire FC II |
| 5 | DF | Adrian Reid Jr | 5 September 2006 (age 20) | 2 | 0 | (Jamaica Football Federation) Cavalier |
| 6 | DF | Rashaun Small | 23 January 2005 (age 21) | 0 | 0 | (Jamaica Football Federation) Portmore United |
| 8 | MF | Makai Welch | 4 October 2005 (age 21) | 0 | 0 | (The Football Association) Leyton Orient |
| 9 | MF | Fabian Reynolds | 6 April 2006 (age 20) | 0 | 0 | (The Football Association) Wolverhampton |
| 12 | MF | Shadeko Wizzard | 14 October 2005 (age 21) | 0 | 0 | (Jamaica Football Federation) Arnett Gardens |
| 16 | MF | Brian Burkett | 22 July 2005 (age 21) | 2 | 0 | (Jamaica Football Federation) Dunbeholden |
| 17 | MF | Alexander Bicknell | 14 February 2005 (age 21) | 3 | 0 | (Portuguese Football Federation) Leixoes SC |
| 7 | FW | Dunsting Cohen | 22 December 2006 (age 19) | 2 | 0 | (Jamaica Football Federation) Vere United |
| 10 | FW | Orane Watson | 11 November 2006 (age 19) | 0 | 0 | (Jamaica Football Federation) Chapelton Maroons |
| 11 | FW | Nashordo Gibbs | 14 April 2006 (age 20) | 0 | 0 | (Jamaica Football Federation) Real Mona |
| 14 | FW | Ashton Gordon | 14 April 2007 (age 19) | 1 | 0 | (United States Soccer Federation) Atlanta United |
| 20 | FW | Nyle Waugh | 18 October 2006 (age 20) | 1 | 0 | (United States Soccer Federation) FC Dallas Academy |

=== 2018 CONCACAF final round squad ===
Squad named for final round.

Stats as of November 4, 2018 following match versus Nicaragua u20s.

| No. | Pos. | Player | Date of birth (age) | Caps | Goals | Club |
|---|---|---|---|---|---|---|
| 1 | GK | Jeadine White | 7 July 2000 (age 26) | 2 | 0 | (Jamaica Football Federation) Cavalier F.C. |
| 2 | DF | Kimani Gibbons | 29 May 2000 (age 26) | 1 | 0 | (Jamaica Football Federation) Portmore United F.C. |
| 3 | DF | Trey Bennett | 22 August 1999 (age 27) | 1 | 0 | (Jamaica Football Federation) UWI F.C. |
| 4 | MF | Jeremy Verley | 9 August 2000 (age 26) | 1 | 0 | |
| 5 | DF | Jamoi Topey | 13 January 2000 (age 26) | 2 | 2 | (United States Soccer Federation) Charleston Battery |
| 6 | DF | Damani Osei | 21 October 2000 (age 25) | 2 | 0 | (United States Soccer Federation) Santa Clara Broncos |
| 7 | MF | Kaheem Parris | 6 January 2000 (age 26) | 0 | 0 | (Football Association of Slovenia) Koper |
| 8 | FW | Leonardo Fogarthy | 7 March 1999 (age 27) | 2 | 0 | (Jamaica Football Federation) Montego Bay United F.C. |
| 9 | FW | Nicque Daley | 19 October 2000 (age 26) | 2 | 1 | (Jamaica Football Federation) Cavalier F.C. |
| 10 | MF | Tyreek Magee | 27 August 1999 (age 27) | 2 | 0 | (Royal Belgian Football Association) Eupen |
| 11 | MF | Tevin Rochester | 6 February 1999 (age 27) | 1 | 1 | (Jamaica Football Federation) Cavalier |
| 12 | DF | Maliek Howell | 27 January 1999 (age 27) | 2 | 0 | (United States Soccer Federation) New Mexico Lobos |
| 13 | GK | Tajay Griffiths | 18 April 2000 (age 26) | 0 | 0 | (Jamaica Football Federation) Harbour View F.C. |
| 14 | DF | Javain Brown | 9 March 1999 (age 27) | 2 | 0 | (Canadian Soccer Association) Vancouver Whitecaps |
| 15 | MF | Nathan Thomas | 11 November 1999 (age 26) | 2 | 0 | (Jamaica Football Federation) Tivoli Gardens F.C. |
| 16 | DF | Casseam Priestley | 2 December 2000 (age 25) | 1 | 0 | (Jamaica Football Federation) Harbour View F.C. |
| 17 | MF | Shandel Senior | 28 February 1999 (age 27) | 2 | 0 | (Jamaica Football Federation) Fraziers Whip |
| 18 | MF | Ricardo Mcintosh | 16 November 2000 (age 25) | 2 | 0 | (Jamaica Football Federation) Portmore United F.C. |
| 19 | MF | Leonardo Jibbison | 14 January 1999 (age 27) | 1 | 0 | (Jamaica Football Federation) Humble Lions F.C. |
| 20 | GK | St Michael Edwards | 6 January 1999 (age 27) | 0 | 0 | (Jamaica Football Federation) Cavalier F.C. |

=== 2016 player pool ===
These are the players called in training camp for the 2016 CFU First round, caps updated on January 1, 2016.

| No. | Pos. | Player | Date of birth (age) | Caps | Goals | Club |
|---|---|---|---|---|---|---|
| | GK | George Brown | | 0 | 0 | (Jamaica Football Federation) Waterhouse F.C. |
| | DF | Jahwahni Hinds | | 0 | 0 | (Jamaica Football Federation) Calabar |
| | DF | Donovan Dawkins | | 0 | 0 | (Jamaica Football Federation) Jamaica College |
| | MF | John Luca Levee | 21 February 1997 (age 29) | 4 | 0 | (United States Soccer Federation) GPS Elite |
| | MF | Siegel Knight | | 0 | 0 | (Jamaica Football Federation) Clarendon College |
| | MF | Kevon Lambert | | 0 | 0 | (Jamaica Football Federation) Glenmuir |
| | MF | Peter-Lee Vassell | | 0 | 0 | (United States Soccer Federation) Indy Eleven |
| | MF | Joseph DeZart II | | 0 | 0 | (United States Soccer Federation) Philadelphia Union |
| | FW | Jourdaine Fletcher | | 0 | 0 | (Jamaica Football Federation) Cornwall College |
| | FW | Deshane Beckford | | 0 | 0 | (Jamaica Football Federation) Montego Bay United F.C. |
| | FW | Nathaniel Adamolekun | 28 August 1998 (age 28) | 0 | 0 | (United States Soccer Federation) Orlando City Academy |
| | FW | Rodave Murray | | 0 | 0 | (Jamaica Football Federation) Waterhouse F.C. |
| | FW | Shamar Nicholson | 16 March 1997 (age 29) | 3 | 0 | (Royal Belgian Football Association) Charleroi |

=== 2015 CONCACAF U20 final squad ===
This is the list for the 2015 CONCACAF U20 Championships, caps updated on January 11, 2014.

| No. | Pos. | Player | Date of birth (age) | Caps | Goals | Club |
|---|---|---|---|---|---|---|
| | GK | Nicholas Nelson | 4 September 1996 (age 30) | 3 | 0 | (United States Soccer Federation) Georgia United |
| | GK | Dane Chambers | 16 June 1995 (age 31) | 3 | 0 | (Jamaica Football Federation) Harbour View F.C. |
| | DF | Malcolm Stewart | 14 April 1996 (age 30) | 4 | 0 | (United States Soccer Federation) UNC Charlotte |
| | DF | Javaun Waugh | 16 November 1995 (age 30) | 6 | 0 | (Jamaica Football Federation) Portmore United |
| | DF | Shaquille Dyer | 10 August 1995 (age 31) | 5 | 0 | (Jamaica Football Federation) Arnett Gardens F.C. |
| | DF | Rennico Clarke | 26 August 1995 (age 31) | 6 | 0 | (Jamaica Football Federation) Harbour View |
| | DF | Nicholas Garel | 10 February 1995 (age 31) | 8 | 10 | (Jamaica Football Federation) Hope Pasture |
| | DF | Roberto Johnson | 23 September 1995 (age 31) | 4 | 0 | (Jamaica Football Federation) Portmore United F.C. |
| | DF | Allando Brown | 27 September 1996 (age 30) | 3 | 0 | (Jamaica Football Federation) Jamaica College |
| | DF | Joel Cunningham | 21 August 1996 (age 30) | 2 | 0 | (Jamaica Football Federation) Wolmers Boys High School |
| | MF | I'Ishmale Currie | 6 June 1996 (age 30) | 2 | 0 | (Jamaica Football Federation) Portmore United F.C. |
| | MF | Martin Davis | 11 October 1996 (age 30) | 3 | 0 | (Malta Football Association) Gżira United |
| | MF | Luca Levee | 21 February 1997 (age 29) | 4 | 0 | (Jamaica Football Federation) Harbour View |
| | MF | Isamnia Cohen | 21 September 1995 (age 31) | 2 | 0 | (Jamaica Football Federation) Manchester High School |
| | MF | Cardel Benbow | 3 June 1995 (age 31) | 4 | 0 | (Jamaica Football Federation) Waterhouse F.C. |
| | FW | Shamar Nicholson | 16 March 1997 (age 29) | 3 | 0 | (Royal Belgian Football Association) Charleroi |
| | FW | Junior Flemmings | 16 January 1996 (age 30) | 5 | 2 | (United States Soccer Federation) Birmingham Legion |
| | FW | Khallil Stewart | 19 January 1996 (age 30) | 2 | 0 | (United States Soccer Federation) College of Charleston |
| | FW | Michael Seaton | 1 May 1996 (age 30) | 2 | 2 | (German Football Association) Viktoria Köln |
| | FW | Daniel Roberts | 30 May 1995 (age 31) | 3 | 0 | (Jamaica Football Federation) Rivoli United F.C. |
| | FW | Donja Smith | 13 September 1995 (age 31) | 3 | 2 | (Jamaica Football Federation) St. Elizabeth Technical High School |

=== 2015 player pool ===
| No. | Pos. | Player | Date of birth (age) | Caps | Goals | Club |
|---|---|---|---|---|---|---|
| | DF | Kyle Smith | May 1995 (age 31) | 2 | 0 | (Jamaica Football Federation) Harbour View |
| | MF | Ryan Miller | 5 September 1996 (age 30) | 3 | 2 | (Jamaica Football Federation) Cavalier F.C. |
| | MF | Javon East | 25 June 1995 (age 31) | 1 | 0 | (Jamaica Football Federation) Portmore United |
| | MF | Raffique Bryan | 13 May 1996 (age 30) | 1 | 0 | (Jamaica Football Federation) Arnett Gardens F.C. |

== Former coaches ==
- 1999 Clovis DeOlivera (Brazil)
- 2001 Clovis DeOlivera (Brazil)
- 2003 Wendell Downswell (Jamaica)
- 2005 Wendell Downswell (Jamaica)
- 2007 Dr Dean Weatherly (Jamaica)
- 2009 Donovan Duckie (Jamaica)
- 2011 Walter Gama (Brazil)
- 2013 Wendell Downswell (Jamaica)
- 2015 Theodore Whitmore (Jamaica)
- 2020-2022 Jerome Waite (Jamaica)
