= Allan Ottey =

Jamaican footballer (born 1992)

Personal information
- Full name: Allan Thimmoy Ottey
- Date of birth: 18 December 1992 (age 33)
- Position: Striker

Youth career
- St James high school Montego Bay United F.C.

Senior career*
Years	Team	Apps	(Gls)
2011–2017	Montego Bay United	91	(19)
2017	Faulkland F.C.	11	(?)
2018	Waterhouse F.C.	15	(2)
2018–2021	Montego Bay United	12	(2)
2022	Mount Pleasant	6	(3)
2022–2024	Montego Bay United	23	(8)

International career^{‡}
2010–2011	Jamaica U20	3	(1)
2015–	Jamaica	1	(0)
Medal record
Men's football
Representing Jamaica
CONCACAF Gold Cup
Runner-up	2015 United States–Canada	Team
- * Club domestic league appearances and goals as of 5 June 2015 ‡ National team caps and goals as of 5 June 2015 (UTC)

Allan Thimmoy Ottey (born 18 December 1992) is a Jamaican international footballer who plays as a striker.

== Career ==
=== Club ===
==== Montego Bay United ====
Ottey has played senior club football for Montego Bay United.

==== Faulkland FC ====
In 2017, Ottey moved to Faulkland FC in the Western Super League.

==== Waterhouse FC ====
In 2018, Ottey moved to Waterhouse F.C. reuniting with Donovan Duckie in the RSPL.

=== International ===
Ottey has played for Jamaica at the U20 and senior team level.

== Honours ==
- Jamaica National Premier League: 2

2014, 2016

- Jamaica National Premier League runners up 2015
- CONCACAF Gold Cup:2015 (Runner-up)
