= Kaheim Dixon =

Jamaican footballer

Personal information
- Full name: Kaheim Anthony Dixon
- Date of birth: 4 October 2004 (age 22)
- Place of birth: Trench Town, Kingston, Jamaica
- Height: 1.81 m (5 ft 11 in)
- Position: Forward

Team information
- Current team: Novi Pazar
- Number: 20

Senior career*
Years	Team	Apps	(Gls)
2022–2023	Chapelton Maroons	3	(0)
2023–2024	Arnett Gardens	8	(4)
2024–2026	Charlton Athletic	3	(0)
2025–2026	→ Crawley Town (loan)	14	(0)
2026–	Novi Pazar	13	(5)

International career^{‡}
2024–	Jamaica	32	(4)
Medal record
Men's football
Representing Jamaica
CONCACAF Nations League
Bronze medal – third place	2024 United States	Team
- * Club domestic league appearances and goals as of 17:10, 14 November 2026 (UTC) ‡ National team caps and goals as of 17:10, 14 November 2026 (UTC)

Kaheim Anthony Dixon (born 4 October 2004) is a Jamaican football player who plays as a forward for Serbian Superliga club Novi Pazar, and the Jamaica national team.

== Youth and High School career ==
Although Dixon resided in Kingston, he commuted and boarded while attending secondary school at Clarendon College, where he had a standout schoolboy football career in Jamaica's DaCosta Cup competition.

== Club career ==
=== Charlton Athletic ===
Having started his playing career in his native Jamaica with Chapelton Maroons and Arnett Gardens, Dixon moved to England to join League One side Charlton Athletic on 23 August 2024.

On 19 October 2024, Dixon made his debut for Charlton Athletic, coming on as a 91st minute substitute in a 1–1 draw, in League One, with Stockport County.

==== Crawley Town (loan) ====
On 15 August 2025, Dixon joined League Two side Crawley Town on a season-long loan.

On 2 February 2026, Dixon was recalled early from his loan.

=== Novi Pazar ===
On 24 July 2026, it was announced that Dixon had joined Novi Pazar on a three-year deal.

== International career ==
Dixon made his debut for the senior Jamaica national team on 22 March 2024 in a CONCACAF Nations League semi-final against the United States.

== Career statistics ==
=== Club ===
As of match played 8 November 2026

Appearances and goals by club, season and competition
Club	Season	League			National Cup		League Cup		Other		Total	
Club	Season	Division	Apps	Goals	Apps	Goals	Apps	Goals	Apps	Goals	Apps	Goals
Chapelton Maroons	2022–23	Jamaica Premier League	3	0	0	0	—		0	0	3	0
Chapelton Maroons	Chapelton Maroons total		3	0	0	0	0	0	0	0	3	0
Arnett Gardens	2023–24	Jamaica Premier League	8	4	0	0	—		5 (Note: Five appearances and two goals in the Jamaica Premier League Play-Offs)	2	13	6
Arnett Gardens	Arnett Gardens total		8	4	0	0	0	0	5	2	13	6
Charlton Athletic	2024–25	League One	3	0	0	0	0	0	2 (Note: Two appearances in the EFL Trophy)	0	5	0
Charlton Athletic	2025–26	Championship	0	0	0	0	0	0	—		0	0
Charlton Athletic	Charlton Athletic total		3	0	0	0	0	0	2	0	5	0
Crawley Town (loan)	2025–26	League Two	14	0	1	0	—		1 (Note: One appearance and one goal in the EFL Trophy)	1	16	1
Novi Pazar	2026–27	Serbian SuperLiga	13	5	1	1	—		—		14	6
Career total			41	9	2	1	0	0	8	3	51	13

=== International ===
As of match played 14 November 2026

Appearances and goals by national team and year
National team	Year	Apps	Goals
Jamaica	2024	11	2
Jamaica	2025	13	1
Jamaica	2026	8	1
Total		32	4

Scores and results list Jamaica's goal tally first, score column indicates score after each Dixon goal.

List of international goals scored by Kaheim Dixon
No.	Date	Venue	Opponent	Score	Result	Competition
1	1 March 2024	Manny Ramjohn Stadium, San Fernando, Trinidad and Tobago	Trinidad and Tobago	1–0	1–0	Friendly
2	9 June 2024	Windsor Park, Roseau, Dominica	Dominica	2–0	3–2	2026 FIFA World Cup qualification
3	31 May 2025	Gtech Community Stadium, Brentford, England	Nigeria	1–1	2–2	2025 Unity Cup
4	27 May 2026	The Valley, Charlton, England	India	2–0	2–0	2026 Unity Cup

== Honours ==
Jamaica

- Unity Cup runner-up: 2025, 2026
