= JFF Championship =

- Founded: 2022
- Country: Jamaica
- Confederation: CONCACAF
- Number of clubs: 14
- Promotion to: Jamaica Premier League
- Relegation to: Regional Super Leagues
- Current champions: Spanish Town Police (2025)
- Website: https://jff.football/

The JFF Championship is the second-tier league of football in Jamaica. It is organized by the Jamaica Football Federation.

== History ==
Originally known as the JFF Tier 2, the league's inaugural season was played in 2022.

== Promotion/Relegation ==
The top two teams in the JFF Championship are promoted to the Jamaica Premier League the following season. Teams are relegated to and promoted from their regional Super Leagues, including the KSAFA Super League, South Central Confederation Super League, Eastern Confederation Super League, and Western Confederation Super League. Previously the top club from each of the four Super Leagues played each other to determine the two teams that qualified directly to the Premier League.

== Clubs in the 2025/2026 season ==
Group A

- Lime Hall FC
- Portlanders FC
- Baptist Alliance
- Brown's Town FC
- Progressive FC
- Wi-Fi United
- Meadforest FC
- Tru-Juice FC

Group B

- Humble Lion FC
- St. Bess United
- Petersfield FC
- Duncans United
- Vere United F.C.
- Falmouth United
- Boys Town FC
- Holland United

== List of winners ==
Season	Champions	Runners-up	Ref.
2022	Faulkland	Chapelton Maroons	
2023	Treasure Beach	Lime Hall Academy	
2024	Chapelton Maroons	Racing United	
2025	Spanish Town Police	Treasure Beach	
