= Shandel Senior =

Jamaican footballer (born 1999)

Personal information
- Date of birth: 28 February 1999 (age 27)
- Place of birth: Hayes, Jamaica
- Positions: Midfielder; defender

Team information
- Current team: Daytona SC
- Number: 12

College career
Years	Team	Apps	(Gls)
2018–2020	Daytona State Falcons	14	(0)
2020–	Florida Gulf Coast University Eagles	9	(0)

Senior career*
Years	Team	Apps	(Gls)
2016–2017	Jamalco	4	(0)
2017	Vere United		
2017–2018	Fraser's Whip		
2019–	Daytona SC	5	(0)

International career^{‡}
2018	Jamaica u20	3	(0)
2018–	Jamaica	1	(0)
- * Club domestic league appearances and goals as of 16 June 2019 ‡ National team caps and goals as of 16:22, 4 February 2019 (UTC)

Shandel Senior (born 28 February 1999) is a Jamaican international footballer who plays for Daytona SC in USL League Two as well as the Daytona State Falcons. Senior plays as a midfielder or a defender.

== Career ==
=== Club ===
Born in Hayes, Senior has played club football for Jamalco, Vere United, Fraser's Whip and Daytona State Falcons. Senior joined USL League Two expansion club Daytona SC in 2019. He was named to League Two's Top 50 Prospect list.

=== International ===
He made his international debut for Jamaica in 2018. Senior also played for the Jamaica u20 national team in November 2018.
