= Tyreek Magee =

Jamaican footballer (born 1999)

Personal information
- Full name: Tyreek Anthony Magee
- Date of birth: 27 August 1999 (age 27)
- Place of birth: Kingston, Jamaica
- Height: 1.80 m (5 ft 11 in)
- Position: Midfielder

Team information
- Current team: Colorado Springs Switchbacks
- Number: 21

Senior career*
Years	Team	Apps	(Gls)
2015–2019	Harbour View	21	(1)
2019–2023	Eupen	7	(0)
2023–2024	Colorado Springs Switchbacks	42	(6)
2025	Vere United	13	(3)
2025	Mount Pleasant F.A.	4	(0)
2026–	Colorado Springs Switchbacks	13	(1)

International career^{‡}
2018	Jamaica U20	6	(4)
2019–	Jamaica	16	(0)
- * Club domestic league appearances and goals as of 19:52, 8 November 2026 (UTC) ‡ National team caps and goals as of 23:15, 9 February 2025 (UTC)

Tyreek Anthony Magee (born 27 August 1999) is a Jamaican professional footballer who plays as a midfielder for USL Championship club Colorado Springs Switchbacks and the Jamaica national team.

== Club career ==
Magee began his club career at Harbour View in Jamaica.

Magee signed a four-year deal with Belgian top flight club Eupen in 2019, after impressing while on trial.

On 2 May 2023, Magee joined USL Championship club Colorado Springs Switchbacks on a one-year contract.

In 2025 Magee joined Vere United F.C. in Jamaica on a short-term deal through the end of the 2024-2025 domestic season.

In October 2025, Magee signed with Mount Pleasant F.A. in Jamaica.

On 17 April 2026, Colorado Spring Switchbacks announced they had signed Magee to a multi-year contract through the 2027 USL Championship season including a club option for 2028.

== International career ==
In August 2019, Magee played for the Jamaican under-23 national team in the Pan American Games.

On 30 June 2019, he made his debut for the Jamaican senior national team as a late substitute in a friendly against the United States.

In 2024, Magee was called up again to Jamaica's senior national team.

== Career statistics ==
=== Club ===
As of 26 April 2025.

Club	Season	League			Cup		Continental		Other		Total	
Club	Season	Division	Apps	Goals	Apps	Goals	Apps	Goals	Apps	Goals	Apps	Goals
Harbour View	2015–16	Jamaica Premier League	1	0	0	0	0	0	0	0	1	0
Harbour View	2016–17	Jamaica Premier League	0	0	0	0	0	0	0	0	0	0
Harbour View	2017–18	Jamaica Premier League	6	0	0	0	0	0	0	0	6	0
Harbour View	2018–19	Jamaica Premier League	14	1	0	0	0	0	0	0	14	1
Harbour View	Total		21	1	0	0	0	0	0	0	21	1
Eupen	2021-22	Belgian Pro League	2	0	0	0	0	0	0	0	2	0
Eupen	2022-23	Belgian Pro League	5	0	0	0	0	0	0	0	5	0
Eupen	Total		7	0	0	0	0	0	0	0	7	0
Colorado Springs Switchbacks	2023	USL Championship	25	3	0	0	0	0	0	0	25	3
Colorado Springs Switchbacks	2024	USL Championship	18	3	1	0	0	0	1	0	20	3
Colorado Springs Switchbacks	Total		43	6	1	0	0	0	1	0	45	6
Vere United	2024–25	Jamaica Premier League	13	3	—		—		—		13	3
Career Total			83	9	1	0	0	0	1	0	85	9

=== International ===
As of match played 9 February 2025.

National team	Year	Apps	Goals
Jamaica	2019	2	0
Jamaica	2020	2	0
Jamaica	2021	4	0
Jamaica	2022	1	0
Jamaica	2023	1	0
Jamaica	2024	4	0
Jamaica	2025	2	0
Total		16	0

== Honors ==
- USL Championship
  - Colorado Springs Switchbacks FC
    - Champion: 2024
