= Javane Bryan =

Jamaican footballer (born 1996)

Personal information
- Full name: Javane Bryan
- Date of birth: 22 February 1996 (age 30)
- Place of birth: Jamaica
- Position: Striker

Team information
- Current team: Waterhouse
- Number: 9

Senior career*
Years	Team	Apps	(Gls)
2017–2018	Jamalco		
2021–2023	Meadforest		
2023–	Waterhouse	31	(17)
- * Club domestic league appearances and goals as of 11 January 2024

Javane Bryan (born 22 January 1996) is a Jamaican footballer who plays as a striker for Waterhouse Football Club.

== Career ==
Bryan signed for Waterhouse in the top flight Jamaica Premier League prior to the start of the 2023–24 season. Bryan received high praises for his performance in the first half of his debut season after scoring a hat-trick versus Vere United to lead Waterhouse on a run of three consecutive wins.

== Honors ==
Individual

- Jamaica Premier League Golden Boot: 2023–24
