= Justin Dunn (footballer) =

Jamaican footballer (born 2003)

Personal information
- Date of birth: 27 August 2003 (age 23)
- Place of birth: Kingston, Jamaica
- Position: Forward

Team information
- Current team: Tivoli Gardens
- Number: 9

Senior career*
Years	Team	Apps	(Gls)
2021–	Tivoli Gardens	63	(18)
- * Club domestic league appearances and goals as of 26 June 2024

Justin Dunn (born 27 August 2003) is a Jamaican footballer who plays for Tivoli Gardens Football Club.

== Career ==
Dunn began his career signing for Tivoli Gardens in 2021. Used as wingback for his first 3 seasons at the club, Dunn was converted to a forward by head coach, Jerome Waite, at the start of the 2023-24 season.

Dunn made his name in Tivoli Gardens history by scoring the first hat-trick of the 2023–24 season, doing so in the West Kingston Derby against arch-nemesis Arnett Gardens on their rivals home ground.
