= Donovan Duckie =

Jamaican football manager (born 1976)

Personal information
- Date of birth: 10 July 1976
- Place of birth: Jamaica

Managerial career
- Years: Team
- 2015–2017: Humble Lion
- 2017–2018: Waterhouse
- 2018–2019: Mount Pleasant
- 2021–2022: Vere United
- 2022–2023: Montego Bay United
- 2024–2025: Humble Lion

Donovan Duckie (born July 10, 1976) is a Jamaican football manager who last managed Humble Lion.

== Early life ==
Duckie is a native of Port Maria, Jamaica.

== Career ==
According to one commentator, Duckie "rose to prominence as a young coach after guiding Star Cosmos FC to the National Premier League in 2003 and St. Georges S.C. in 2007".

Phoenix Academy Director, Craig Butler, had this to say about Duckie: “His work is exemplary and his work ethic is consistent with the culture we have and want to maintain,” said Butler. He continued: "Duckie is a pleasure to work with. He is first to training and last to leave and instils discipline and has great structure and organisation in his work."

== Personal life ==
Duckie has a son.
