= Rondee Smith =

Jamaican footballer (born 1991)

Personal information
- Full name: Rondee Smith
- Date of birth: 7 August 1991 (age 35)
- Place of birth: Jamaica
- Height: 1.75 m (5 ft 9 in)
- Position: Striker

Team information
- Current team: Portmore United
- Number: 20

Senior career*
| Years | Team | Apps | (Gls) |
| 2011–2017 | Manchioneal | | |
| 2017– | Portmore United | | |

International career^{‡}
| 2017– | Jamaica | 1 | (0) |
- * Club domestic league appearances and goals as of 13:01, 21 January 2018 (UTC) ‡ National team caps and goals as of 13:01, 21 January 2018 (UTC)

Rondee Smith (born 7 August 1991) is a Jamaican international footballer who plays for Portmore United, as a striker.
