= Omar Wedderburn =

Jamaican football manager

Omar Wedderburn is a Jamaican football manager who last managed Treasure Beach.

== Early life ==
Wedderburn attended Godfrey Stewart High School in Jamaica.

== Career ==
Wedderburn managed St. Elizabeth Technical High School in Jamaica, helping the team win the league.

== Style of play ==
Wedderburn was described as "used at right back, sometimes as a right link player and ultimately in the forward position during his playing days, where his 10 goals in 1998 were a great achievement for a utility player such as he was".

== Personal life ==
Wedderburn is nicknamed "Rambo".
