= Andrew Vanzie =

Jamaican footballer (born 1990)

Personal information
- Full name: Andrew Anthony Vanzie
- Date of birth: 26 November 1990 (age 35)
- Position: Midfielder

Team information
- Current team: Spanish Town Police

Senior career*
| Years | Team | Apps | (Gls) |
| 2011–2014 | Portmore United | 82 | (5) |
| 2014–2024 | Humble Lions | 202 | (28) |
| 2024–2026 | Phoenix Chapelton Maroons | 44 | (3) |
| 2026– | Spanish Town Police | 16 | (1) |

International career^{‡}
| 2011– | Jamaica | 3 | (0) |
- * Club domestic league appearances and goals as of 08:46, 15 November 2026 (UTC) ‡ National team caps and goals as of 8 June 2014

Andrew Anthony Vanzie (born 26 November 1990) is a Jamaican international footballer who plays for Spanish Town Police, as a midfielder.

== Career ==
Vanzie has played club football for Portmore United and Humble Lions, Phoenix Chapelton Maroons, and Spanish Town Police.

He made his international debut for Jamaica in 2011.
