= Joel Cunningham (footballer) =

Jamaican footballer

Personal information
- Full name: Joel Antonio Cunningham
- Date of birth: August 21, 1996 (age 30)
- Place of birth: Spanish Town, Jamaica

Team information
- Current team: Arnett Gardens
- Number: 21

Youth career
- Wolmer's Boys' School

College career
Years	Team	Apps	(Gls)
2015–2018	Howard Bison	71	(2)

Senior career*
Years	Team	Apps	(Gls)
2018–2020	D.C. United U-23		
2020–2022	KFF	1	(0)
2022–	Arnett Gardens	45	(0)

International career
2015	Jamaica U-20	1	(0)
- * Club domestic league appearances and goals

Joel Cunningham (born 21 August 1996) is a Jamaican footballer who plays for Arnett Gardens in the Jamaica Premier League as a defender.

== Career ==
=== School/Club ===
Born in Spanish Town, Jamaica, Cunningham made name for himself at Wolmer's Boys’ School in Kingston, Jamaica. Cunningham moved to Howard University's soccer team Howard Bison in 2015.

Cunningham signed for D.C. United U-23 after leaving Howard in 2018. After 2 years in D.C. Cunningham moved to Iceland, signing with KFF in 2020.

Cunningham returned to Jamaica in 2022 signing with Arnett Gardens.

=== International ===
Cunningham has represented Jamaica at the under-20 level.

In January 2024, Cunningham was called up to a domestic senior national team camp.
