= Ricardo Thomas =

Jamaican footballer (born 1997)

Personal information
- Full name: Ricardo Theodore Thomas
- Date of birth: 30 May 1990 (age 36)
- Place of birth: Kingston, Jamaica
- Height: 1.77 m (5 ft 10 in)
- Position: Left back

Team information
- Current team: Dunbeholden

Senior career*
Years	Team	Apps	(Gls)
2013–2014	Greenwich Town		
2014–2017	Newlands		
2015–2016	→ Molynes United (loan)		
2017	Maverley Hughenden	6	(0)
2017–2022	Waterhouse	106	(2)
2022–	Dunbeholden	58	(9)

International career^{‡}
2018–	Jamaica	14	(0)
- * Club domestic league appearances and goals as of 23:22, 29 December 2024 (UTC) ‡ National team caps and goals as of 11:06, 23 March 2024 (UTC)

Ricardo Theodore Thomas (born 30 May 1990) is a Jamaican international footballer who plays for Dunbeholden, as a left back.

== Career ==
=== Club ===
Born in Kingston, Thomas has played club football for Greenwich Town, Newlands, Molynes United, Maverley Hughenden and Waterhouse. In 2022, Thomas signed for Dunbeholden.

=== International ===
He made his international debut for Jamaica in 2018.
