= Kemar Foster =

Jamaican association football player (born 1992)

Kemar Robert Foster
Personal information
- Date of birth: 30 August 1992 (age 34)
- Position: Goalkeeper

Team information
- Current team: Waterhouse

Senior career*
Years	Team	Apps	(Gls)
2016-2021	Portmore United	48	(0)
2022-	Waterhouse	90	(0)

International career
2022-	Jamaica	4	(0)
- * Club domestic league appearances and goals as of 00:15 (UTC) 3 June 2025

Kemar Robert Foster (born 30 August 1992) is a Jamaican professional footballer who plays as a goalkeeper for Waterhouse. He also playing for the Jamaica national team.

== Club national team. ==
yed for Portmore United in the Concacaf Champions League in 2020. He joined fellow Jamaican Premier League club Waterhouse in 2022. In 2024, he was captain of the team.

== International career ==
He played for Jamaica at under-20 level, and made his senior international debut for Jamaica in August 2022 against Qatar in a 1-1 draw. In 2023, he was called-up by the Jamaica squad for their CONCACAF Nations League matches by manager Heimir Hallgrímsson.
