= Lenny Hyde =

Jamaican football manager

Lenworth Hyde Sr. is a Jamaican football manager and former player who manages Dunbeholden.

== Playing career ==
Hyde played for Jamaican side Tivoli Gardens at a young age, helping the club win the league.

Hyde debuted for the Jamaica U19s in 1976. He went on to represent the senior national team from 1978 to 1991.

== Managing career ==
Hyde has won the Jamaican league three times as a manager.

== Personal life ==
Hyde has five children, including track and field athlete Jaheel Hyde.
