= Mount Pleasant F.A. =

Association football club in Jamaica

Mount Pleasant
- Full name: Mount Pleasant Football Academy
- Nickname: Stush
- Founded: 2016; 10 years ago
- Ground: Mount Pleasant stadium Saint Ann's Bay, Saint Ann, Jamaica
- Capacity: 3,500
- Coordinates: 18.436°N 77.202°W
- Chairman: Peter Gould
- Head coach: Theodore Whitmore
- League: Jamaica Premier League
- 2025–26: Regular season: 1st Playoffs: 3rd place
- Website: www.mountpleasantacademyja.org

Mount Pleasant Football Academy is a Jamaican professional football club based in the parish of Saint Ann. The club currently plays in the Jamaica Premier League.

== History ==
Formed in 2016 by Peter Gould, Mount Pleasant F.A., formerly known as “Stush in the Bush”, is nestled in the hills of St Ann, less than five minutes from the Runaway Bay main road, and has brought back football hype to the parish for the first time since Benfica F.C. participated in the 2010–11 season.

The club gained promotion for the first time to the Jamaica Premier League via the playoffs on July 1, 2018, by finishing second in the four team table. On June 11, 2023, the club won its first ever league title in history, defeating Cavalier F.C. 2–1 at Sabina Park.

On November 8th 2026 Mount Pleasant played there first Fixture at the Mount pleasant stadium beating Tiovli Gardens 2-1.

== Players ==
=== Current squad ===
As of 25 September 2026

Note: Flags indicate national team as defined under FIFA eligibility rules; some limited exceptions apply. Players may hold more than one non-FIFA nationality.

No.	Pos.	Nation	Player
3	DF	JAM	Romain Blake
4	DF	JAM	Fitzroy Cummings
5	DF	JAM	Ricardo Thomas
6	MF	HAI	Daniel Saint-Fleur
7	MF	JAM	Nickalia Fuller
8	FW	JAM	Chevaughn Walsh
9	FW	JAM	Daniel Green
10	FW	JAM	Nicholas Nelson
11	FW	JAM	Trayvone Reid
12	MF	JAM	Kimoni Bailey
15	DF	JAM	Kyle Ming
16	DF	JAM	Jaheem Douglas
17	MF	JAM	Jahshaun Anglin
18	FW	JAM	Rashawn Williams
19	FW	JAM	Warner Brown

No.	Pos.	Nation	Player
20	MF	JAM	Luca' Kung
21	MF	JAM	Demarko Smith
23	MF	JAM	Lamar Walker
24	MF	JAM	Devone Davis
25	MF	LCA	Shevon Byron
26	MF	HAI	Clifford Thomas
28	DF	JAM	Shaquille Dyer
31	MF	JAM	Demario Phillips
34	GK	JAM	Kemar Foster
38	FW	JAM	Shaqueil Bradford
42	DF	JAM	Jamoi Topey
77	FW	HAI	Angelo Exilus
—	DF	JAM	Sue-Lae McCalla
80	GK	JAM	Shaquan Davis
96	GK	JAM	Shaquan Davis

== Club staff ==
Role	Name
Head Coach	(Jamaica) Theodore Whitmore
Assistant Head Coach	(Jamaica) Davion Ferguson

== Honours ==
=== Domestic ===
- Jamaica Premier League
  - Champions (1): 2022–23
  - Runners-up (2): 2023–24, 2024–25
- JFF Champions Cup
  - Champions (1): 2026.
  - Runners-up (0): .
- CONCACAF Caribbean Cup
  - Champions (1): 2025
- CFU Club Shield
  - Champions (1): 2026

== Performance in CONCACAF competitions ==
The following is a list of results for Mount Pleasant F.A. in international competitions. Mount Pleasant F.A.'s scores are listed first.

Year	Tournament	Round	Opponent	Home	Away	Agg.
2024	CONCACAF Caribbean Cup	Group Stage	(Jamaica) Cavalier	0–2		
2024	CONCACAF Caribbean Cup	Group Stage	(Jamaica) Arnett Gardens		2–1	
2024	CONCACAF Caribbean Cup	Group Stage	(Trinidad and Tobago) Police		0–0	
2024	CONCACAF Caribbean Cup	Group Stage	(Haiti) Real Hope	0–2		
2025	CONCACAF Caribbean Cup	Group Stage	(Suriname) Robinhood	1–0		
2025	CONCACAF Caribbean Cup	Group Stage	(Dominican Republic) Moca		2–0	
2025	CONCACAF Caribbean Cup	Group Stage	(Trinidad and Tobago) Central		2–0	
2025	CONCACAF Caribbean Cup	Group Stage	(Dominican Republic) O&M	2–0		
2025	CONCACAF Caribbean Cup	Semi-finals	(Trinidad and Tobago) Defence Force	0–1	5–1	5–2
2025	CONCACAF Caribbean Cup	Final	(Dominican Republic) O&M	2–2	1–0	3–2
2026	CONCACAF Champions Cup	Round of 16	(United States) LA Galaxy	0–3	0–3	0–6
2026	CFU Club Shield	Quarter-finals	(Barbados) Weymouth Wales		1–0	
2026	CFU Club Shield	Semi-finals	(Suriname) Robinhood		3–1	
2026	CFU Club Shield	Final	(Dominican Republic) Delfines del Este		1–0	
2026	CONCACAF Caribbean Cup	Group Stage	(Dominican Republic) Cibao	1–2		
2026	CONCACAF Caribbean Cup	Group Stage	(Dominican Republic) Salcedo		1–1	
2026	CONCACAF Caribbean Cup	Group Stage	(Jamaica) Portmore United		1–0	
2026	CONCACAF Caribbean Cup	Group Stage	(Jamaica) Cavalier	1–0		
2026	CONCACAF Caribbean Cup	Semi-finals	(Trinidad and Tobago) Club Sando	2–0	1–1	3–1
2026	CONCACAF Caribbean Cup	Final	(Jamaica) Portmore United			
2027	CONCACAF Champions Cup	TBD	TBD			
