= Neider dos Santos =

Brazilian football manager

Personal information
- Date of birth: 1964 or 1965 (age 61–62)
- Place of birth: Brazil

Team information
- Current team: Montego Bay United (manager)

Managerial career
- Years: Team
- Vasco da Gama (Youth)
- Botafogo (Youth)
- Cayman Islands
- 2002–2004: Guyana
- 2005: Simba
- 2006–2010: Bahamas
- 2010–2011: Village United
- 2011–2012: Montego Bay United
- 2014–2017: Saint George
- 2023–: Montego Bay United

Neider dos Santos (born 1964/1965) is a Brazilian football coach who manages Jamaican club Montego Bay United.

== Career ==
Dos Santos started his managerial career with the Vasco da Gama youth teams.

He has previously managed Simba SC in Tanzania, as well as the youth teams of Brazilian clubs Vasco da Gama and Botafogo, plus the national teams of Cayman Islands and Guyana. Dos Santos took over as manager of Jamaican club Village United in late 2010, having spent the previous four years as manager of the Bahamas national team. After leaving Jamaican club Village United in early 2011, Dos Santos was hired by newly promoted Montego Bay United in October 2011. By September 2012 he was the club's Technical Director.

He became manager of Ethiopian club Saint George in 2014, and was still in charge of them in May 2017.

In March 2023 he returned as manager of Montego Bay United, helping the club to avoid relegation.
