= Ludlow Bernard =

Jamaican football manager)

Personal information
- Place of birth: Jamaica

Managerial career
- Years: Team
- 2005–2017: Harbour View
- 2020–: Harbour View

Ludlow Bernard is a Jamaican football manager who last managed Harbour View.

== Early life ==
Bernard attended Kingston College in Jamaica.

== Career ==
Bernard has been described as having "spent almost his entire career at Harbour View in one role or another". He helped the club win the league. Previously, he managed Kingston College in Jamaica, helping the team win the Manning Cup.
