= Lime Hall Academy F.C. =

Football club

Lime Hall Academy Football Club is a football club based in Brown's Town, Jamaica who compete in the Jamaican Premier League.

Lime Hall were promoted to the Jamaica Premier League for the first time in 2010 where they were contestants under the name Benfica. They returned to top flight football in 2023 but were however relegated at the end of the season.
