= Barrington Pryce =

Jamaican footballer (born 1993)

Personal information
- Full name: Barrington Akeem Pryce
- Date of birth: 14 August 1993 (age 33)
- Position: Defender

Team information
- Current team: Tivoli Gardens

Senior career*
Years	Team	Apps	(Gls)
2012–	Tivoli Gardens	118	(4)
2013–2014	→ Rivoli United (loan)	12	(0)

International career^{‡}
2018–	Jamaica	2	(0)
- * Club domestic league appearances and goals as of 16:22, 4 February 2019 (UTC) ‡ National team caps and goals as of 16:22, 4 February 2019 (UTC)

Barrington Akeem Pryce (born 14 August 1993) is a Jamaican international footballer who plays for Tivoli Gardens, as a defender.

== Career ==
Pryce has played club football for Tivoli Gardens and Rivoli United.

He made his international debut for Jamaica in 2018.
