= Portmore United F.C. =

Association football club in Jamaica

- Full name: Portmore United Football Club
- Nickname: PMU
- Founded: 1985 (as Hazard United); 2003 (as Portmore United F.C.)
- Ground: Ferdi Neita Sports Complex; Portmore, Jamaica
- Capacity: 2,500
- Chairman: Garwin Tulloch
- Manager: Romar Beckford
- Coach: Rodolph Austin
- League: Jamaica Premier League
- 2025–26: Regular season: 3rd Playoffs: Champions
Home colours	Away colours

Portmore United Football Club is a Jamaican professional football team in the top flight Jamaica Premier League. With 7 Jamaica Premier League titles, 5 JFF Champions Cup and 2 Caribbean Club Championships, Portmore United is the most decorated club in Jamaican Football.

The team plays its home matches at the Ferdie Nieta Park.

== History ==
=== Hazard United ===
The club was formed as Hazard United and has been around for more than 20 years. They started out in the Clarendon League in Division 2, then played two years in Division 1 when they qualified for Craven A Premier League. They have been in Jamaica National Premier League ever since. Hazard United were based in May Pen and won two league titles (1993 and 2003).

=== Move to Portmore and rebranding as Portmore United ===
Portmore United was founded in the late 20th century in Hazard as Hazard United. In the early 21st century, the club moved to Clarendon and renamed itself to honor its Clarendon home. JFF regulations stipulated that each club have stands with seating capacity of at least 1,500 persons, which Clarendon did not have. In order to honor this requirement, the team subsequently moved to St. Catherine and began to use the Ferdi Neita Sports Complex. Initially, Clarendon and the St. Catherine football club agreed to share the same stadium. However, in 2002, St. Catherine suggested Clarendon change its affiliation to become a St. Catherine team. However, due to an anaemic growth rate in support due to a club name which was not locally identifiable, Clarendon instead chose to move to Portmore and rebrand itself as Portmore United. The club has won four (4) Premier League titles since it relocated to the Portmore community.

The club also has teams in youth divisions, including Under 20, Under 17, Under 15, and Under 13. A number of players from these teams have been capped with their respective Jamaica national teams.

In October 2008, Portmore were stunned as technical director Donovan Duckie quit the club for personal reasons. Duckie had only recently succeeded Horace Reid in August 2008 after Portmore won the league title. The team’s current management staff includes Andre Waugh as technical director and joint head coaches Philip Williams, Rodolph Austin and Kevin Deerr.

=== Modern Era ===
Portmore United defeated Cavalier 2-0 in the inaugural 2023 Lynk Cup all-island knockout final to claim the first ever Lynk Cup trophy. Adding to the team existing 4 JFF Champions Cup titles, Portmore United now has a record setting 5 all-island knockout titles.

=== Rivalries ===
Portmore Derby

A local derby has developed between Portmore United and Dunbeholden since the latter’s promotion to the premier league in the 2018-19 season. Both clubs are closely located in the city of Portmore, the matchup is coined the Portmore Derby.

== Current squad ==
As of 25 September 2026

Note: Flags indicate national team as defined under FIFA eligibility rules; some limited exceptions apply. Players may hold more than one non-FIFA nationality.

No.	Pos.	Nation	Player
3	DF	JAM	Rashaun Small
4	DF	JAM	Steven Young
5	DF	JAM	Clayton Peck
6	DF	JAM	Emelio Rosseau
8	DF	JAM	Akeem Mullings
9	FW	JAM	Peter McGregor
10	FW	JAM	Cory Burke
11	MF	JAM	Romario Guthrie
12	MF	JAM	Javier Brown
13	GK	JAM	Daveigh Payton
14	FW	JAM	Jevaughn Grant
15	MF	JAM	Marques Reid
16	MF	JAM	Orlando Russell

No.	Pos.	Nation	Player
17	DF	JAM	Gawain Austin
18	MF	JAM	Tedj Bryan
20	MF	JAM	Jahein Rose
22	FW	JAM	Ronaldo Robinson
23	MF	JAM	Markland Burton
25	FW	JAM	Stevaughn Spence
26	MF	JAM	Ramone Howell
27	FW	JAM	Venton Evans
29	MF	JAM	Nickoy Gayle
31	FW	JAM	Demario Dailey
32	GK	JAM	Daniel Russell
40	GK	JAM	Sheldon York
47	DF	JAM	Tarick Ximines

== Honours ==
=== Official trophies (recognized by CONCACAF and FIFA) ===
==== National ====
- Jamaica Premier League
  - Champions (8): 1992–93, 2002–03, 2004–05, 2007–08, 2011–12, 2017–18, 2018–19, 2025-26
  - Runners-up (5): 2001–02, 2006–07, 2008–09, 2015–16, 2016–17
- JFF Champions Cup
  - Champions (5): 2000, 2003, 2005, 2007, 2023

==== International ====
- Caribbean Club Championship
  - Champions (2): 2005, 2019

=== Doubles ===
- League & JFF Champions Cup: 2002–03
- League & Caribbean Club Championship: 2018–19

=== Trebles ===
- League, JFF Champions Cup & Caribbean Club Championship: 2004–05

== Performance in CONCACAF competitions ==
The following is a list of results for Portmore United F.C. in international competitions. Portmore United F.C.'s scores are listed first.

Year	Tournament	Round	Opponent	Home	Away	Agg.
2003	CFU Club Championship	First Round	(Dominica) Pointe Michel			w/o
2003	CFU Club Championship	Second round	(Curaçao) Barber	1–0	2–1	3–1
2003	CFU Club Championship	Semi-finals	(Trinidad and Tobago) W Connection		0–0	0–1
2003	CFU Club Championship	Semi-finals	(Trinidad and Tobago) W Connection		0–1	0–1
2005	CFU Club Championship	Quarter-finals	(Antigua and Barbuda) Hoppers		3–0	10–0
2005	CFU Club Championship	Quarter-finals	(Antigua and Barbuda) Hoppers		7–0	10–0
2005	CFU Club Championship	Semi-finals	(Curaçao) Barber		3–1	3–2
2005	CFU Club Championship	Semi-finals	(Curaçao) Barber		0–1	3–2
2005	CFU Club Championship	Final	(Suriname) Robinhood		1–2	5–2
2005	CFU Club Championship	Final	(Suriname) Robinhood		4–0	5–2
2006	CONCACAF Champions' Cup	Quarter-finals	(Mexico) América		1–2	3–7
2006	CONCACAF Champions' Cup	Quarter-finals	(Mexico) América		2–5	3–7
2007	CFU Club Championship	First Round	(United States Virgin Islands) Helenites		2–0	
2007	CFU Club Championship	First Round	(Suriname) Leo Victor		3–0	
2007	CFU Club Championship	Quarter-finals	(Jamaica) Harbour View		0–2	
2013	CFU Club Championship	First Round	(Jamaica) Boys' Town		1–0	
2013	CFU Club Championship	First Round	(Haiti) Valencia		3–4	
2013	CFU Club Championship	First Round	(Puerto Rico) Bayamón		5–0	
2013	CFU Club Championship	Play-off Round	(Trinidad and Tobago) Caledonia AIA		0–1	2–3
2013	CFU Club Championship	Play-off Round	(Trinidad and Tobago) Caledonia AIA		2–2	2–3
2017	Caribbean Club Championship	First Round	(Cayman Islands) Scholars International		2–0	
2017	Caribbean Club Championship	First Round	Puerto Rico FC		1–0	
2017	Caribbean Club Championship	First Round	(Suriname) Transvaal		6–1	
2017	Caribbean Club Championship	Final Round	(Haiti) Racing		1–0	
2017	Caribbean Club Championship	Final Round	(Trinidad and Tobago) San Juan Jabloteh		2–2	
2017	Caribbean Club Championship	Third Place Match	(Trinidad and Tobago) Central		2–2	
2017	CONCACAF League	Round of 16	(Panama) Plaza Amador	1–0	0–1	1–1
2018	Caribbean Club Championship	Group Stage	(Trinidad and Tobago) Central		2–0	
2018	Caribbean Club Championship	Group Stage	(Dominican Republic) Atlántico		2–2	
2018	Caribbean Club Championship	Group Stage	(Haiti) Racing		0–1	
2018	Caribbean Club Championship	Semi-finals	(Dominican Republic) Atlético Pantoja	3–4		
2018	Caribbean Club Championship	Third Place Match	(Trinidad and Tobago) Central	2–1		
2018	CONCACAF League	Round of 16	(Costa Rica) Santos de Guápiles	1–2	2–1	3–3
2018	CONCACAF League	Quarter-finals	(Honduras) Motagua	0–2	2–3	2–5
2019	Caribbean Club Championship	Group Stage	(Haiti) Real Hope	1–0		
2019	Caribbean Club Championship	Group Stage	(Haiti) Capoise	1–0		
2019	Caribbean Club Championship	Group Stage	(Jamaica) Waterhouse	1–1		
2020	CONCACAF Champions League	Round of 16	(Mexico) Cruz Azul	1–2	0–4	1–6
2020	Caribbean Club Championship	Group Stage	(Dominican Republic) Atlético Pantoja	0–4		
2020	Caribbean Club Championship	Group Stage	(Haiti) Arcahaie	0–1		
2026	CONCACAF Caribbean Cup	Group Stage	(Dominican Republic) Salcedo	1–2		
2026	CONCACAF Caribbean Cup	Group Stage	(Jamaica) Cavalier		2–0	
2026	CONCACAF Caribbean Cup	Group Stage	(Jamaica) Mount Pleasant	0–1		
2026	CONCACAF Caribbean Cup	Group Stage	(Dominican Republic) Cibao		2–1	
2026	CONCACAF Caribbean Cup	Semi-finals	(Haiti) Violette	3–1		4–3
2026	CONCACAF Caribbean Cup	Semi-finals	(Haiti) Violette	1–2		4–3
2026	CONCACAF Caribbean Cup	Final	(Jamaica) Mount Pleasant			
2027	CONCACAF Champions Cup	TBD	TBD			

=== Record by opponent ===
Team	Pld	W	D	L	GF	GA	GD	WPCT
(Haiti) Arcahaie	1	0	0	1	0	1	−1	0.00
(Mexico) América	2	0	0	2	3	7	−4	0.00
(Dominican Republic) Atlético Pantoja	2	0	0	2	3	8	−5	0.00
(Dominican Republic) Atlántico	1	0	1	0	2	2	0	0.00
(Puerto Rico) Bayamón	1	1	0	0	5	0	+5	100.00
(Jamaica) Boys' Town	1	1	0	0	1	0	+1	100.00
(Trinidad and Tobago) Morvant Caledonia United	2	0	1	1	2	3	−1	0.00
(Haiti) Capoise	1	1	0	0	1	0	+1	100.00
(Jamaica) Cavalier	1	1	0	0	2	0	+2	100.00
(Mexico) Cruz Azul	2	0	0	2	1	6	−5	0.00
(Trinidad and Tobago) Central	3	2	1	0	6	3	+3	66.67
(Dominican Republic) Cibao	1	1	0	0	2	1	+1	100.00
(Curaçao) Barber	4	3	0	1	6	3	+3	75.00
(Costa Rica) Santos de Guápiles	2	1	0	1	3	3	0	50.00
(Jamaica) Harbour View	1	0	0	1	0	2	−2	0.00
(United States Virgin Islands) Helenites	1	1	0	0	2	0	+2	100.00
(Antigua and Barbuda) Hoppers	2	2	0	0	10	0	+10	100.00
(Trinidad and Tobago) San Juan Jabloteh	1	0	1	0	2	2	0	0.00
(Suriname) Leo Victor	1	1	0	0	3	0	+3	100.00
(Honduras) Motagua	2	0	0	2	2	5	−3	0.00
(Jamaica) Mount Pleasant	1	0	0	1	0	1	−1	0.00
(Panama) Plaza Amador	2	1	0	1	1	1	0	50.00
Puerto Rico FC	1	1	0	0	1	0	+1	100.00
(Haiti) Racing	2	1	0	1	1	1	0	50.00
(Haiti) Real Hope	1	1	0	0	1	0	+1	100.00
(Suriname) Robinhood	2	1	0	1	5	2	+3	50.00
(Dominican Republic) Salcedo	1	0	0	1	1	2	−1	0.00
(Cayman Islands) Scholars International	1	1	0	0	2	0	+2	100.00
(Suriname) Transvaal	1	1	0	0	6	1	+5	100.00
(Haiti) Violette	2	1	0	1	4	3	+1	50.00
(Haiti) Valencia	1	0	0	1	3	4	−1	0.00
(Jamaica) Waterhouse	1	0	1	0	1	1	0	0.00
(Trinidad and Tobago) W Connection	2	0	1	1	0	1	−1	0.00
Total	50	23	6	21	82	63	+19	46.00

Source: Results

== Former players who played at international clubs ==
- (Jamaica) Jason Morrison
- (Jamaica) Alvas Powell
- (Jamaica) Omar Daley
- (Jamaica) Claude Davis
- (Jamaica) Rodolph Austin
- (Jamaica) Jermie Lynch
- (Jamaica) Duwayne Kerr
- (Jamaica) Ricardo Cousins
- (Jamaica) Lamar Walker
- (Jamaica) Andre Lewis
- (Jamaica) Chavany Willis
- (Jamaica) Shakeone Satchwell
- (Jamaica) Maalique Foster
- (Jamaica) Javon East
- (Jamaica) Ricardo Morris
- (Jamaica) Tremaine Stewart
- (Jamaica) Ewan Grandison
- (Jamaica) Shavar Thomas
- (Jamaica) Linval Dixon
- (Jamaica) Paul Young
- (Jamaica) Rafe Wolfe
- (Jamaica) Wolry Wolfe
- (Jamaica) Demar Stewart
- (Jamaica) Roen Nelson
- (Jamaica) Damian Williams
- (Jamaica) Eric Vernan
- (Jamaica) Venton Evans
- (Jamaica) Tevin Shaw
- (Jamaica) Michael Binns

== Former coaches ==
- (Jamaica) Leebert Halliman
- (Jamaica) Horace Reid
- (Jamaica) Bradley Stewart
- (Jamaica) Lenworth Hyde
- (Jamaica) Donovan Duckie
- (Jamaica) Neville Bell
- (Jamaica) Calvin Lewis
- (Jamaica) Andre Waugh
- (Jamaica) Paul Young (2005–07)
- (Jamaica) Linval Dixon (2007–09), (2010)
- (Jamaica) Shavar Thomas (2017–19)
- (Jamaica) Ricardo Gardner (2019–21)
- (Jamaica) Lenworth Hyde (2021–22)
- (Jamaica) Philip Williams (2022–present)
