= Fabian Reid =

Jamaican footballer (born 1991)

Personal information
- Full name: Fabian Dwayne Reid
- Date of birth: 6 August 1991 (age 35)
- Place of birth: Kingston, Jamaica
- Height: 1.78 m (5 ft 10 in)
- Position: Midfielder

Team information
- Current team: Arnett Gardens
- Number: 13

Senior career*
Years	Team	Apps	(Gls)
2008–2009	Boys' Town		
2009–2014	Arnett Gardens	72	(12)
2014–2016	San Juan Jabloteh	48	(7)
2016–2019	Arnett Gardens	91	(30)
2019	Dila Gori	3	(0)
2019–2023	Arnett Gardens	57	(23)
2023	NEROCA	3	(1)
2024–	Arnett Gardens	13	(10)

International career^{‡}
2017–2018	Jamaica	7	(3)
- * Club domestic league appearances and goals as of 18:09, 7 April 2024 (UTC) ‡ National team caps and goals as of 18:32, 9 October 2023 (UTC)

Fabian Dwayne Reid (born 6 August 1991) is a Jamaican professional footballer who plays as a midfielder for Jamaica Premier League club Arnett Gardens.

== Club career ==
Born in Kingston, Reid spent his early career with Boys' Town and Arnett Gardens, before moving to play for Trinidadian club San Juan Jabloteh. After two seasons abroad he returned to Arnett Gardens. He spent time in Georgia with Dila Gori, before returning to Arnett Gardens for a third spell.

In August 2023, Reid joined I-League club NEROCA. He scored first league goal for the club against Shillong Lajong at SSA Stadium on 9 November, in an 1–1 draw.

In January 2024 he returned to former club Arnett Gardens. In February 2024 he became the first player to score 80 goals in the Jamaica Premier League.

== International career ==
Reid made his national team debut for Jamaica in 2017. By May 2018, Reid had scored 3 goals in 5 official and unofficial games for Jamaica.

=== International goals ===
Scores and results list Jamaica's goal tally first.

No	Date	Venue	Opponent	Score	Result	Competition
1.	25 August 2017	Hasely Crawford Stadium, Port of Spain, Trinidad and Tobago	Trinidad and Tobago	2–1	2–1	Friendly
2.	26 April 2018	Warner Park Sporting Complex, Basseterre, Saint Kitts and Nevis	Saint Kitts and Nevis	1–0	3–1	Friendly
3.	29 April 2018	Sir Vivian Richards Stadium, North Sound, Antigua and Barbuda	Antigua and Barbuda	2–0	2–0	Friendly
