= Hayes, Jamaica =

Settlement in Jamaica

Coordinates: 17.881°N 77.239°W

Location of Hayes in Jamaica

Hayes is a settlement in Jamaica covering an area of 90.7 km^{2} (35.0 sq mi) and is located in the parish of Clarendon. It has a population of 36,688 as of 2015.
