= Faulkland F.C. =

Faulkland Football Club is a football club based in Saint James Parish, Jamaica.
