= Treasure Beach F.C. =

Jamaican football club

Treasure Beach Football Club
- Founded: 1993
- Ground: BREDS Sport Park
- Chairman: Jason Henzell O.D.
- Coach: Kemar Ricketts
- League: Jamaica Premier League
- 2025-26: 11th
Home colours

Treasure Beach Football Club is a football club based in Treasure Beach, Jamaica.

Treasure Beach were promoted to the Jamaica Premier League for the first time in 2023. They were the first club from St. Elizabeth to play in the top flight since 1980.

Treasure Beach also narrowly missed out on promotion in 2022, losing in the playoff semi-finals to Chapelton Maroons.

For the 2023-24 season, the club was the only club in the top flight to be owned by a non-profit, which secured $3 million in sponsorship for the team's participation after their promotion.
