= Arnett Gardens F.C. =

Football club in Jamaican league

- Full name: Arnett Gardens Football Club
- Nickname: Junglists
- Founded: 1977; 49 years ago
- Ground: Anthony Spaulding Sports Complex, Kingston, Jamaica
- Capacity: 7,000
- President: (Jamaica) Chris Bicknell
- Chairman: (Jamaica) Mark Golding
- Manager: (Jamaica) Xavier Gilbert
- League: Jamaica Premier League
- 2025–26: Regular season: 7th
- Website: https://arnettgardensfc.org
| Home colours | Away colours |

The Arnett Gardens Football Club is a Jamaican professional football club based in Kingston, which currently plays in the Jamaica Premier League.

The team is based in the Arnett Gardens community of South Saint Andrew, Jamaica, and plays in the Anthony Spaulding Sports Complex.

== History ==
The team came out of a merger between the All Saints and Jones Town Football teams in 1977. Arnett's fans originate primarily from Arnett Gardens and its adjoining communities – Jones Town, Craig Town, Hannah Town & Admiral Town. The Junglists, as their fans are known, are very passionate and vociferous about their team and will travel all over the country in support of the team. The Arnett Gardens part of Kingston is popularly known as the Concrete Jungle, hence the nickname of the club.

The club won the league in its first season, 1978. Although it suffered a long drought after that, it re-emerged at the start of the new millennium, winning both the 2000–01 and 2001–02 championships.

=== Recent seasons and managerial changes ===
The start of the 2007–08 season proved to be one of their worst ever and forced coach Max Straw to resign on 14 January 2008 to be replaced by former coach Jerome Waite, who led Arnett Gardens to the celebrated back-to-back titles of 2001 and 2002. They then finished the season four points above the relegation zone after winning 3 of their final 4 games.

Waite himself was axed after only four games into the 2008–09 season, losing all games and managing to score only one goal. He was replaced by Fabian Davis, who left his post at the end of 2009. As of January 2010, Wayne Fairclough was the team's coach but he decided to quit in October 2010. Fairclough was succeeded by former national team striker Paul Davis.

Davis took them to a creditable 5th place in the 2012–13 season, his third with the club, before he resigned in November 2012 citing a lack of commitment from the players and other issues within the club. In October 2013, his successor Calvin Lewis resigned and his place was taken by former coach Jerome Waite.

Alex Thomas took over the reins for the 2019–20 season. On October 22, 2021, he had resigned from his position as head coach.

On October 26, 2021, Paul Davis was announced as the newly appointed head coach.

Xavier Gilbert was appointed as the new head coach on August 21, 2023.

On August 5, Arnett Gardens F.C. won their first ever international cup, the CFU Caribbean Club Shield, by defeating Grenades F.C. at the Stadion Rignaal 'Jean' Francisca, Willemstad.

== Anthony Spaulding Sports Complex ==
Anthony Spaulding Sports Complex
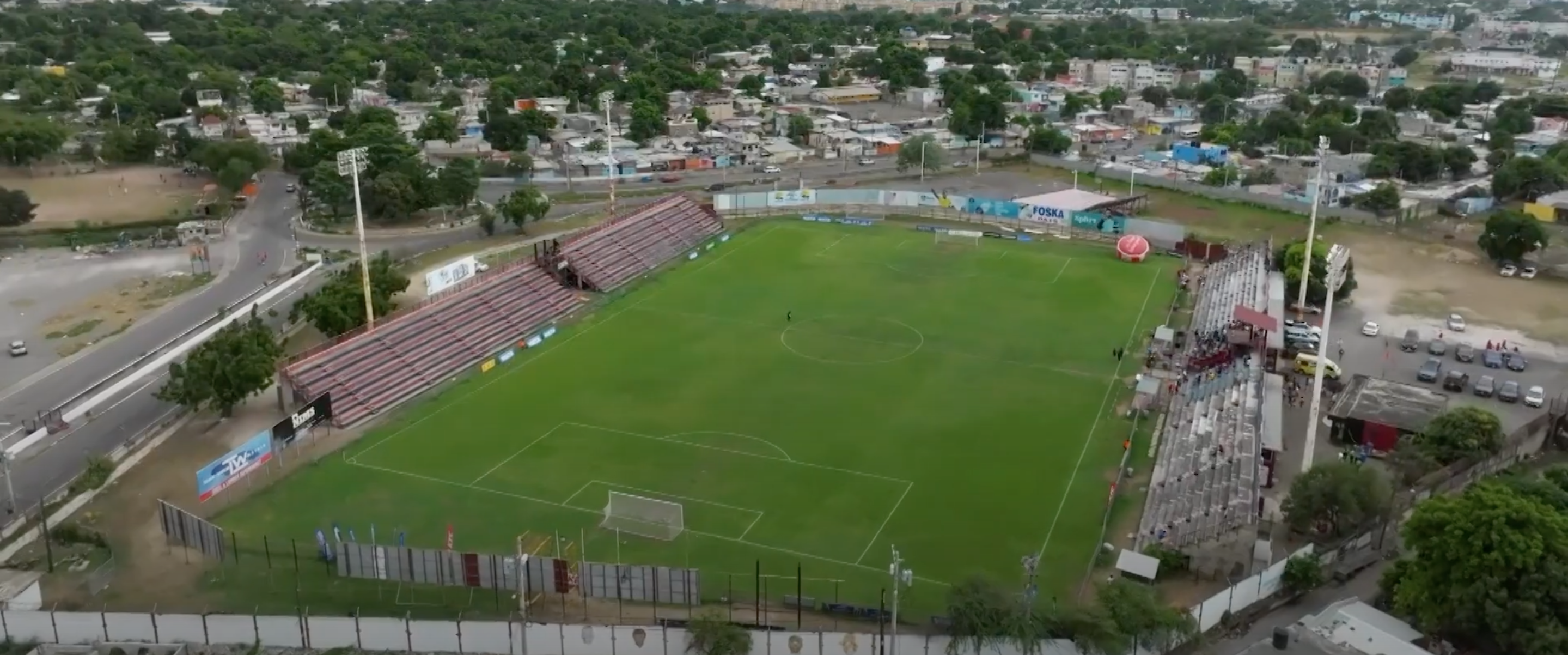
- Anthony Spaulding Sports Complex (March 2025)
- Interactive map of Anthony Spaulding Sports Complex
- Address: 645 Collie Smith Drive
- Location: Kingston, Jamaica
- Coordinates: 17.9891°N 76.7993°W
- Owner: Arnett Gardens
- Operator: Arnett Gardens
- Capacity: 6,000+
- Surface: Grass

Tenants
- Arnett Gardens; Jamaica national football team (selected matches); Chapelton Maroons (JPL) 2024—present

Anthony Spaulding Sports Complex is a multi-sport facility, featuring a football stadium, futsal, basketball, netball, gym, VIP lounge and administrative offices. It is the home field of Arnett Gardens F.C. and has a capacity of 6,000+. The venue is named in honor of the late Jamaican attorney-at-law and politician Anthony Spaulding.

The venue is regularly used to host televised double-headers in the Jamaica Premier League and Jamaica Women's Premier League. In February 2025 the venue was used by Jamaica national football team to host an international friendly versus Trinidad and Tobago.

== Players ==
=== Current squad ===
As of 23 August 2024

Note: Flags indicate national team as defined under FIFA eligibility rules; some limited exceptions apply. Players may hold more than one non-FIFA nationality.

| No. | Pos. | Nation | Player |
|---|---|---|---|
| 1 | GK | JAM | Asher Hutchinson |
| 3 | DF | JAM | Nickache Murray |
| 4 | DF | JAM | Earl Simpson |
| 5 | DF | JAM | Roshawn Amos |
| 6 | DF | JAM | Joel Jones |
| 7 | MF | JAM | Jamone Shephard |
| 8 | MF | JAM | Marlon Martin |
| 9 | FW | JAM | Warner Brown |
| 10 | MF | JAM | Rushike Kelson |
| 11 | FW | JAM | Shai Smith |
| 12 | FW | JAM | Kimani Arbourine |
| 13 | MF | JAM | Fabian Reid |
| 14 | MF | JAM | Roderick Granville |
| 15 | FW | JAM | Jahvon James |
| 16 | FW | JAM | Kevoan McGregor |
| 17 | DF | LCA | Shanoi Evans |
| 18 | MF | JAM | Jaheim Thomas |

| No. | Pos. | Nation | Player |
|---|---|---|---|
| 19 | DF | JAM | Phillando Wing |
| 20 | DF | JAM | Gerald Neil Jr. |
| 21 | DF | JAM | Joel Cunningham |
| 22 | MF | JAM | Rushane Thompson |
| 23 | DF | JAM | Deandre Cunningham |
| 24 | DF | JAM | Osani Ricketts |
| 25 | MF | JAM | Chavany Willis |
| 26 | DF | JAM | Shane Watson |
| 27 | MF | JAM | Jahiem Harris |
| 28 | MF | JAM | Amarlie King |
| 29 | MF | JAM | Shadeko Wizzard |
| 30 | MF | JAM | Malike Stephens |
| 31 | DF | JAM | Keneldo Brown |
| 40 | GK | JAM | Richardo White |
| 45 | GK | JAM | Croccifixio Thompson |
| 55 | GK | JAM | Eric Edwards |

== Achievements ==
=== Domestic ===
- Jamaica Premier League
  - Champions (5): 1977–78, 2000–01, 2001–02, 2014–15, 2016–17
  - Runners-up (4): 1990–91,1992–93, 1996–97, 2002–03
- JFF Champions Cup
  - Runners-up: 1995–96
- KSAFA Jackie Bell Knockout Competition
  - Champions (7): 1989–90, 1991–92, 1994–95, 1998–99, 2004–05, 2011–12, 2015–16
  - Runners-up (2): 2002–03, 2010–11

=== International ===
- CFU Caribbean Club Shield
  - Champions (1): 2024
- Caribbean Club Championship
  - Runners-up (2): 2002, 2018
