= Phoenix Chapelton Maroons F.C. =

Jamaican football club

- Full name: Phoenix Chapelton Maroons Football Club
- Nicknames: Maroons phoenix
- Founded: 1980; 46 years ago,
- Ground: Turner's oval
- Capacity: 300
- Head coach: Donovan Duckie
- League: Jamaica Premier League
- 2025–26: Jamaica Premier League, 8th of 14

Phoenix Chapelton Maroons Football Club, commonly known as Chapelton or Maroons, is a Jamaican football club based in Chapelton (Clarendon Parish), Jamaica. Phoenix Chapelton Maroons plays in the Jamaica Premier League and have won JFF Championship title once; in 2023–24, and were runners up in the 2021–22 season, thus gaining their first ever promotion to the Jamaica Premier League.

The club formed in 1980 based in the community of Turners in Clarendon. The name Maroons signifies historical pride and fighting spirit in the community. The club currently competes in the Jamaica Premier League. They play their home matches in the Turner's Oval.
