= Vere United F.C. =

Jamaican football club

- Full name: Vere United Football Club
- Founded: 2010
- Ground: Wembley Center Of Excilence, Hayes, Hayes, Jamaica
- Capacity: 2,000
- Owner: Ahmani Pendleton
- Chairman: Quindell Pendleton
- Manager: Arnon Webster
- Coach: Dwayne Hoover
- League: JFF Championship
colours	colours

Vere United F.C. is a Jamaican football team based in Clarendon. They currently play in the JFF Championship after being relegated in 2024.

The club was formerly named Jamalco F.C. Jamalco played in the Premier League in 2016–17 after being promoted, finishing last, and was relegated.

== Current squad ==
As of 23 November 2023

Note: Flags indicate national team as defined under FIFA eligibility rules; some limited exceptions apply. Players may hold more than one non-FIFA nationality.

No.	Pos.	Nation	Player
1	GK	JAM	Shakur Adair
4	DF	JAM	Damion Thomas
5	DF	JAM	Carlton Brown
6	DF	JAM	Michael Forbes
7	MF	JAM	Marcos Pegoretti
8	FW	JAM	Romarion Thomas
9	DF	JAM	Robino Gordon
10	MF	JAM	Denzel McKenzie
12	MF	JAM	Marlon Cunningham
13	MF	JAM	Saqlain Waul
14	DF	JAM	Aboubacar Kaba
15	DF	JAM	Sean Leighton
16	MF	JAM	Alex Gayle
17	MF	TRI	Matthew Woo Ling
18	MF	JAM	Daniel Daley
19	MF	JAM	Dante Peralto
20	DF	JAM	Trevance Salmon

No.	Pos.	Nation	Player
21	DF	JAM	Matt Ludford
22	FW	JAM	Dunsting Cohen
23	DF	JAM	Michael Graham
24	FW	NGA	Destiny Oladipo
25	MF	VIN	Shemron Phillips
27	MF	JAM	Maquan Parchment
28	MF	JAM	Bliss Nelson
31	GK	JAM	Davin Watkins
32	DF	JAM	Jadon Anderson
33	DF	GRN	David Juba
60	GK	JAM	Mikhail Harrison
66	DF	JAM	Demarion Harris
—	FW	JAM	Kevaughn Atkinson
—	MF	JAM	Tyreek Magee
—	DF	JAM	Donhue Mitchell
—	MF	JAM	Jaheim Dorman
