= Waterhouse F.C. =

Jamaican football club

- Full name: Waterhouse Football Club
- Nickname: Fire-House
- Founded: 1968
- Ground: Waterhouse Stadium, Waterhouse, Kingston, Jamaica
- Capacity: 5,000
- Chairman: Bruce Bicknell
- Manager: Marcel Gayle
- League: Jamaica Premier League
- 2023–24: Regular season: 6th Playoffs: Fourth place
Home colours

The Waterhouse Football Club is a professional football team based in Kingston, that competes in the Jamaica Premier League.

Their home stadium is Waterhouse Stadium.

== History ==
The club was founded in 1968 as Harlem Kickers FC, changed to The Great West Football Club in 1972 until it was renamed Waterhouse in 1979 and started with their home ground at Emmett Park. Their home ground has since been moved into the community, The Waterhouse Stadium, which can hold a capacity of up to 5,000.

They won the league title in 2005–06, which was said to be dedicated to the late Peter Cargill, their coach who died in a car crash.

== Players ==
=== Current squad ===
As of 24 November 2023

Note: Flags indicate national team as defined under FIFA eligibility rules; some limited exceptions apply. Players may hold more than one non-FIFA nationality.

No.	Pos.	Nation	Player
4	DF	JAM	Javain Linton
5	MF	JAM	Devonte Walker
8	MF	JAM	Duvaughn Dunkley
9	FW	JAM	Javane Bryan
10	MF	JAM	Denardo Thomas
12	MF	JAM	Andre Smith
15	FW	JAM	Andre Fletcher
23	MF	JAM	Nickoy Christian
24	DF	JAM	Elvis Wilson
25	DF	JAM	Orlando Brown

No.	Pos.	Nation	Player
26	FW	JAM	Donte Duncan
27	FW	JAM	Rochane Smith
29	FW	JAM	Kemar Reid
33	MF	JAM	Rojia Layne
34	GK	JAM	Kemar Foster
39	DF	JAM	Kenniel Hyde
42	GK	JAM	John Wilson
45	DF	JAM	Malika Cocking
62	DF	JAM	Shamarie Dallas
63	DF	JAM	Delano Daley

=== Other players under contract ===
Note: Flags indicate national team as defined under FIFA eligibility rules; some limited exceptions apply. Players may hold more than one non-FIFA nationality.

No.	Pos.	Nation	Player
3	DF	JAM	Kenly Deacon
6	MF	JAM	Shemar Booth
7	MF	JAM	Jaheim Dorman
11	MF	JAM	Leonardo Jibbison
13	FW	JAM	Jermaine Morgan

No.	Pos.	Nation	Player
19	DF	JAM	Dareio Dacres
20	FW	JAM	Rondee Smith
21	DF	JAM	Damion Binns
31	FW	JAM	Revaldo Mitchell
47	DF	JAM	Navardo Blair

== Achievements ==
=== Domestic ===
- Jamaica Premier League
  - Champions (2): 1997–98, 2005–06
  - Runners-up (7): 1999–00, 2000–01, 2012–13, 2013–14, 2017–18, 2018–19, 2021
- JFF Champions Cup
  - Champions (3): 2004, 2008, 2013
  - Runners-up: 1997–98
- KSAFA Jackie Bell Knockout Competition
  - Winners (4): 1996–97, 2001–02, 2002–03, 2014–15
  - Runners-up (4): 1997–98, 2005–06, 2007–08, 2015-16

=== Regional ===
- Caribbean Club Championship
  - Runners-up: 2019

== List of coaches ==
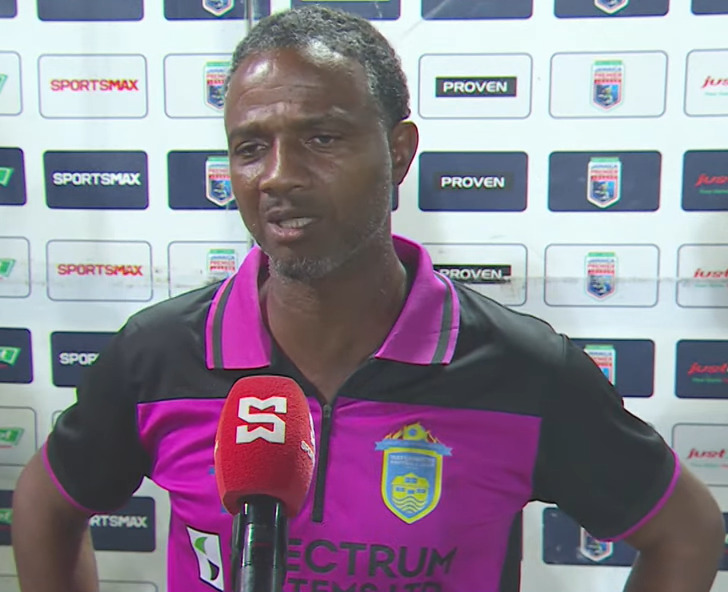
Marcel Gayle Waterhouse FC

- (Jamaica) Peter Cargill † (2004–05)
- (Jamaica) Anthony Patrick
- (Jamaica) Marcel Gayle (2018–present)
