= 2022 Jamaica Premier League =

Jamaican football league

Jamaica Premier League
- Season: 2022
- Dates: 16 January 2022 – 3 July 2022
- Champions: Harbour View (5th title)
- CONCACAF Caribbean Cup: Harbour View; Dunbeholden; Cavalier
- CONCACAF Caribbean Shield: Waterhouse
- Matches: 138
- Goals: 344 (2.49 per match)
- Top goalscorer: (Jamaica) Atapharoy Bygrave (Jamaica) Daniel Green (13 goals each)
- Biggest home win: 6 goals: Mount Pleasant 5-1 Humble Lions
- Biggest away win: 3 goals: Cavalier 0-3 Waterhouse
- Highest scoring: 6 goals: Mount Pleasant 5-1 Humble Lions

The 2022 Jamaica Premier League was the 48th season of the Jamaica Premier League, the top division football competition in Jamaica. The season kicked off on 16 January 2022 and ended on 3 June 2022.

Cavalier F.C. were the defending champions, having won their 2nd Jamaica Premier League title which was their first league title in almost 40 years. Harbour View F.C. won their fifth title.

== Teams ==
Due to financial reasons UWI F.C. withdrew from the league, prior to the shortened 2021 season leaving 11 teams to compete. Montego Bay United were promoted back to the league for this upcoming season, bring the league back to 12 teams.

=== Stadiums and locations ===
Location of teams in the 2022 Jamaica Premier League

| Team | Location | Stadium | Capacity | Manager |
|---|---|---|---|---|
| Arnett Gardens | Kingston | Anthony Spaulding Sports Complex | 7,000 | (Jamaica) Paul Davis |
| Cavalier | Kingston | Stadium East | 2,000 | (Jamaica) Rudolph Speid |
| Dunbeholden | Portmore | Prison Oval | 2,000 | (Jamaica) Harold Thomas |
| Harbour View | Kingston | Harbour View Mini Stadium | 7,000 | (Jamaica) Ludlow Bernard |
| Humble Lions | Clarendon | Effortville Community Centre | 1,000 | (Jamaica) Andrew Price |
| Montego Bay United | St. James | Montego Bay Sports Complex | 7,000 | (England) Ricky Hill |
| Molynes United | Kingston | Jacisera Park | | (Jamaica) Anthony Patrick |
| Mount Pleasant F.A. | Runaway Bay, St. Ann | Drax Hall Sports Complex, Drax Hall | 2,000 | (England) Wally Downes |
| Portmore United | Portmore | Ferdie Neita Sports Complex | 3,000 | (Jamaica) Garnett Lawrence |
| Tivoli Gardens | Kingston | Railway Oval | 3,000 | (Jamaica) Phillip Williams |
| Vere United | Clarendon | Wembley Centre of Excellence | | (Jamaica) Donavon Duckie |
| Waterhouse | Kingston | Waterhouse Stadium | 5,000 | (Jamaica) Marcel Gayle |

== Regular season ==
=== League table ===
| Pos | Team | Pld | W | D | L | GF | GA | GD | Pts | Qualification or relegation |
|---|---|---|---|---|---|---|---|---|---|---|
| 1 | Waterhouse (S) | 22 | 15 | 4 | 3 | 41 | 18 | +23 | 49 | Advance to Playoffs (Semifinals) |
| 2 | Dunbeholden (Q) | 22 | 13 | 5 | 4 | 31 | 22 | +9 | 44 | Advance to Playoffs (Semifinals) |
| 3 | Arnett Gardens | 22 | 12 | 6 | 4 | 39 | 25 | +14 | 42 | Advance to Playoffs (Quarterfinals) |
| 4 | Mount Pleasant | 22 | 12 | 5 | 5 | 38 | 25 | +13 | 41 | Advance to Playoffs (Quarterfinals) |
| 5 | Cavalier (Q) | 22 | 10 | 5 | 7 | 28 | 20 | +8 | 35 | Advance to Playoffs (Quarterfinals) |
| 6 | Harbour View (C, Q) | 22 | 7 | 7 | 8 | 26 | 23 | +3 | 28 | Advance to Playoffs (Quarterfinals) |
| 7 | Humble Lions | 22 | 6 | 10 | 6 | 23 | 22 | +1 | 28 | |
| 8 | Tivoli Gardens | 22 | 7 | 7 | 8 | 29 | 30 | −1 | 28 | |
| 9 | Portmore United | 22 | 5 | 5 | 12 | 15 | 29 | −14 | 20 | |
| 10 | Vere United | 22 | 5 | 5 | 12 | 12 | 21 | −9 | 20 | |
| 11 | Molynes United | 22 | 4 | 3 | 15 | 23 | 44 | −21 | 15 | |
| 12 | Montego Bay United | 22 | 2 | 6 | 14 | 15 | 41 | −26 | 12 | |

Updated to match(es) played on 12 June 2022. Source:

(C): Playoffs Champion, (Q): Qualified for 2023 CONCACAF Caribbean Cup, (S): Qualified for 2023 CONCACAF Caribbean Shield

=== Results ===
| Home \ Away | ARN | CAV | DUN | HAR | HUM | MBU | MOL | MTP | POR | TIV | VER | WAT |
|---|---|---|---|---|---|---|---|---|---|---|---|---|
| Arnett Gardens | — | 1–2 | 1–0 | 3–0 | 2–2 | 3–1 | 2–1 | 0–1 | 2–1 | 2–0 | 2–1 | 4–2 |
| Cavalier | 1–0 | — | 1–2 | 1–0 | 0–2 | 3–0 | 4–1 | 0–0 | 0–1 | 0–1 | 0–0 | 0–3 |
| Dunbeholden | 1–2 | 1–1 | — | 1–1 | 1–0 | 3–0 | 2–1 | 1–1 | 1–0 | 1–1 | 1–0 | 2–2 |
| Harbour View | 1–1 | 0–2 | 0–1 | — | 0–0 | 4–0 | 2–2 | 3–0 | 2–0 | 3–3 | 1–0 | 0–2 |
| Humble Lions | 1–1 | 0–1 | 3–1 | 0–0 | — | 1–0 | 1–2 | 1–2 | 1–0 | 2–2 | 0–0 | 1–1 |
| Montego Bay United | 2–2 | 2–2 | 0–1 | 0–0 | 1–1 | — | 4–1 | 0–3 | 0–1 | 1–1 | 1–1 | 0–3 |
| Molynes United | 3–3 | 0–2 | 0–1 | 1–4 | 2–1 | 2–1 | — | 2–3 | 0–1 | 0–1 | 0–1 | 0–1 |
| Mount Pleasant | 1–1 | 1–3 | 1–3 | 1–0 | 5–1 | 4–0 | 4–1 | — | 0–2 | 4–1 | 1–0 | 1–1 |
| Portmore United | 1–2 | 0–0 | 2–3 | 0–2 | 1–1 | 0–1 | 0–2 | 1–2 | — | 1–1 | 2–1 | 0–4 |
| Tivoli Gardens | 1–3 | 1–3 | 0–1 | 1–2 | 1–1 | 2–0 | 3–1 | 3–1 | 1–1 | — | 3–0 | 0–1 |
| Vere United | 2–1 | 1–0 | 1–2 | 2–0 | 0–0 | 1–0 | 1–1 | 0–1 | 0–0 | 0–1 | — | 0–2 |
| Waterhouse | 0–1 | 3–2 | 4–1 | 2–1 | 1–0 | 2–1 | 0–2 | 1–1 | 3–0 | 2–1 | 1–0 | — |

Updated to match(es) played on 12 June 2022. Source:
Legend: Blue = home team win; Yellow = draw; Red = away team win.

== Playoffs ==
=== Bracket ===
Quarterfinals
6 | Harbour View (p) | 1 | 1 | 2 (8)
3 | Arnett Gardens | 1 | 1 | 2 (7)
4 | Mount Pleasant | 0 | 1 | 1 (3)
5 | Cavalier (p) | 0 | 1 | 1 (4)

Semifinals
1 | Waterhouse | 0 | 1 | 1
6 | Harbour View | 1 | 1 | 2
2 | Dunbeholden (p) | 0 | 4 | 4 (4)
4 | Cavalier | 1 | 3 | 4 (2)

Finals
Harbour View (p) | 1 (6)
Dunbeholden | 1 (5)
3rd place match
Cavalier | 4
Waterhouse | 1

=== Results ===
==== Quarter finals ====
20 June 2022
First Leg

| Harbour View | 1–1 | Arnett Gardens |
|---|---|---|
| T. Reid 45' (pen.) | Report | M. Allen 78' |

Sabina Park, Kingston
Referee: (Jamaica) C. Mason
23 June 2022
20:30 EST(UTC-05:00)
Second Leg

| Arnett Gardens | 1–1 (a.e.t.) | Harbour View |
|---|---|---|
| E. Simpson 68' | Report | S. Dyer 33' |
Penalties
| (penalty scored) F. Reid; (penalty scored) R. Guthrie; (penalty scored) S. Clarke; (penalty scored) O. Anderson; (penalty scored) S. James; (penalty scored) G. Neil; (penalty scored) A. Johnson; (penalty missed) K. Arbouine | 7—8 | (penalty scored) T. Reid; (penalty scored) N. Hamilton; (penalty scored) O. Staple; (penalty scored) S. Dyer; (penalty scored) C. Murray; (penalty scored) A. Talbott; (penalty scored) G. Stewart; (penalty scored) A. Bennett |

Sabina Park, Kingston
Referee: (Jamaica) O. Nicholson

Harbour View win on penalties after 2–2 aggregate draw, advances to the semi-finals.

20 June 2022
20:30 EST(UTC-05:00)
First Leg

| Mount Pleasant | 0–0 | Cavalier |
|---|---|---|
| | Report |

Sabina Park, Kingston
Referee: (Jamaica) N. Goldson
Second Leg

| Cavalier | 1–1 (a.e.t.) | Mount Pleasant |
|---|---|---|
| R. King 26' (pen.) | Report | D. Green 35' |
Penalties
| (penalty scored) R. King; (penalty scored) G. Irving; (penalty scored) M. Doxilly; (penalty missed) K. Campbell; (penalty scored) S. Lopez | 4—3 | (penalty scored) L. Richie; (penalty scored) J. Topey; (penalty missed) D. Segree; (penalty scored) C. Pryce; (penalty missed) D. Green |

Sabina Park, Kingston
Referee: (Jamaica) S. Dewar

Cavalier win on penalties after 1-1 aggregate draw, advances to semi-finals.

==== Semi-finals ====
26 June 2022
18:15 EST(UTC-05:00)
First Leg

| Harbour View | 1–0 | Waterhouse |
|---|---|---|
| N. Hamilton 81' | Report |

Sabina Park, Kingston
Referee: (Jamaica) N. Goldson
29 June 2022
Second Leg

| Waterhouse | 1–1 | Harbour View |
|---|---|---|
| S. Bradford 45' | Report | N. Hamilton 84' |

Sabina Park, Kingston
Referee: (Jamaica) C. Mason

Harbour View wins 2–1 on aggregate, advances to JPL Finals.

26 June 2022
16:00 EST(UTC-05:00)
First Leg

| Cavalier | 0–1 | Dunbeholden |
|---|---|---|
| | Report | P. McGregor 20' |

Sabina Park, Kingston
Referee: (Jamaica) V. Nembhard
30 June 2022
20:30 EST(UTC-05:00)
Second Leg

| Dunbeholden | 3–4 (a.e.t.) | Cavalier |
|---|---|---|
| K. Bailey 16'; A. Bygrave 55', 92' | Report | D. Atkinson 45'; K. Gibbons 60'; R. Webster 64'; R. King 95' |
Penalties
| (penalty missed) F. McCarthy; (penalty scored) D. Phillips; (penalty scored) A. Bygrave; (penalty scored) D. Thomas; (penalty scored) D. Smith | 4—2 | (penalty missed) R. King; (penalty scored) G. Irving; (penalty missed) M. Doxilly; (penalty scored) K. Campbell |

Sabina Park, Kingston
Referee: (Jamaica) O. Hamilton

Dunbeholden wins on penalty after 4-4 aggregate draw, advances to JPL Finals.

==== Third place playoff ====
3 July 2022
16:00 EST(UTC-05:00)

| Cavalier | 4–1 | Waterhouse |
|---|---|---|
| K. Campbell 46'; D. Atkinson 60', 70'; G. Irving 90+3' | Report | K. Simpson 90+3' |

Sabina Park, Kingston
Referee: (Jamaica) T. Robinson

==== Jamaica Premier League Finals ====
| Harbour View | 1–1 (a.e.t.) | Dunbeholden |
|---|---|---|
| C. Murray 2' | Report | D. Phillips 56' |
Penalties
| (penalty scored) T. Reid; (penalty scored) N. Hamilton; (penalty scored) O. Staple; (penalty scored) S. Dyer; (penalty scored) C. Murray; (penalty scored) A. Talbott | 6-5 | (penalty scored) A. Bygrave; (penalty scored) D. Phillips; (penalty scored) D. Thomas; (penalty scored) N. Christian; (penalty scored) D. Smith; (penalty missed) F. McCarthy |

Sabina Park, Kingston
Referee: (Jamaica) O. Nicholson

== Champions ==
Jamaica Premier League Champions

5th title

== Season statistics ==
=== Top scorers ===
| Rank | Scorer | Team | Goals |
|---|---|---|---|
| 1 | (Jamaica) Daniel Green | Mount Pleasant F.A. | 13 |
| 1 | (Jamaica) Atapharoy Bygrave | Dunbeholden F.C. | 13 |
| 3 | (Jamaica) Nicholas Nelson | Molynes United F.C. | 11 |
| 3 | (Jamaica) Cardel Benbow | Waterhouse F.C. | 11 |
| 5 | (Jamaica) Marlon Allen | Arnett Gardens F.C. | 10 |
| 6 | (Jamaica) Trayvone Reid | Harbour View F.C. | 9 |
| 7 | (Jamaica) Peter Mcgregor | Dunbeholden F.C. | 8 |
| 7 | (Jamaica) Trivante Stewart | Molynes United F.C. | 8 |
| 7 | (Jamaica) Colorado Murray | Harbour View F.C. | 8 |
| 10 | (Jamaica) Renaldo Cephas | Arnett Gardens F.C. | 7 |
| 10 | (Jamaica) Denardo Thomas | Waterhouse F.C. | 7 |
| 10 | (Jamaica) Rodico Wellington | Tivoli Gardens F.C. | 7 |
| 10 | (Jamaica) Collin Anderson | Cavalier F.C. | 7 |
| 10 | (Jamaica) Kimani Arbourine | Arnett Gardens F.C. | 7 |
