= 2019–20 National Premier League =

National Premier League
- Season: 2019–20
- Champions: Season cancelled
- Matches: 173
- Goals: 419 (2.42 per match)
- Top goalscorer: Kemar Beckford (14)
- Biggest home win: 7 goals: Waterhouse 7–0 Harbor View
- Biggest away win: 8 matches tied
- Highest scoring: 3 matches tied, 7 goals

The 2019–20 Red Stripe Premier League is the 46th season of the National Premier League, the top division football competition in Jamaica. The season kicked off on 1 September 2019. On March 12, 2020, the season entered a lengthy suspension due to the COVID-19 pandemic, following the cancellation of several matches. Three days later, the Jamaica Football Federation officially cancelled the season on 15 March 2020 as part of its effort to help contain the pandemic.

== Teams ==
Montego Bay United and Reno finished 11th and 12th, respectively, at the conclusion of the 2018–19 National Premier League season and were relegated to the Western Confederation Super League, their respective regional Super League. The two teams promoted from the 2018-19 National Playoff were Vere United and Molynes United.

Location of teams in the 2019–20 National Premier League

Team	Location	Stadium	Stadium Capacity	Manager
Arnett Gardens	Kingston	Anthony Spaulding Sports Complex	7,000	(Jamaica) Jerome Waite
Cavalier	Kingston	Stadium East	2,000	(Jamaica) Rudolph Speid
Dunbeholden	Portmore	Prison Oval	2,000	(Jamaica) Michael Cohen
Harbour View	Kingston	Harbour View Mini Stadium	7,000	(Jamaica) Fabian Taylor
Humble Lions	Clarendon	Effortville Community Centre	1,000	(Jamaica) Admiral Bailey
Molynes United	Kingston	Jacisera Park		(Jamaica) Calvert Fitzgerald
Mount Pleasant F.A.	Runaway Bay, St. Ann	Drax Hall Sports Complex, Drax Hall	2,000	(Jamaica) Donovan Duckie
Portmore United	Portmore	Ferdie Neita Sports Complex	3,000	(Jamaica) Shavar Thomas
Tivoli Gardens	Kingston	Railway Oval	3,000	(Jamaica) Omar Edwards
UWI	Kingston	UWI Bowl	2,000	(Jamaica) Andrew Peart
Vere United	Clarendon	Wembley Centre of Excellence		(Jamaica) Howard Cephas
Waterhouse	Kingston	Waterhouse Stadium	5,000	(Jamaica) Marcel Gayle

== Regular season ==
The season completed 29 matches for most teams. When the JFF announced the suspension of play it was determined that no champion would be declared for any league and no teams would be promoted or relegated; the season was declared null and void.

Pos	Team	Pld	W	L	T	GF	GA	GD	Pts	Qualification or relegation
1	Waterhouse	29	15	5	9	50	27	+23	54	Advance to Playoffs (Semifinals)
2	Mount Pleasant	29	16	8	5	43	22	+21	53	Advance to Playoffs (Semifinals)
3	Portmore United	28	14	10	4	38	28	+10	46	Advance to Playoffs (Quarterfinals)
4	Humble Lions	28	12	6	10	30	23	+7	46	Advance to Playoffs (Quarterfinals)
5	Tivoli Gardens	29	12	10	7	39	34	+5	43	Advance to Playoffs (Quarterfinals)
6	Dunbeholden	29	12	10	7	34	30	+4	43	Advance to Playoffs (Quarterfinals)
7	Arnett Gardens	29	11	9	9	40	42	−2	42	
8	Cavalier	29	10	10	9	41	33	+8	39	
9	Harbour View	29	10	10	9	29	35	−6	39	
10	Molynes United	29	8	16	5	30	47	−17	29	
11	UWI	29	2	15	12	26	51	−25	18	Relegated to Regional confederations
12	Vere United	29	2	15	12	19	47	−28	18	Relegated to Regional confederations

Source: FlashScore

== Top goalscorers ==
Rank	Scorer	Team	Goals
1	(Jamaica) Kemar Beckford	Mount Pleasant	14
2	(Jamaica) Kemal Malcolm	Arnett Gardens	13
3	(Jamaica) Cevone Marsh	Cavalier	12
3	(Jamaica) Colorado Murray	Tivoli Gardens	12
3	(Jamaica) Dean Andre Thomas	Waterhouse	12
6	(Jamaica) Cory Burke	Portmore United	11
7	(Jamaica) Thorn Simpson	UWI	10
8	(Jamaica) Keithy Simpson	Waterhouse	9
9	(Jamaica) Cardel Benbow	Mount Pleasant	7
9	(Jamaica) Davion Garrison	Tivoli Gardens	7
9	(Jamaica) Vishinuel Phillips Harris	Humble Lions	7
9	(Jamaica) Xhane Reid	Vere United	7
9	(Jamaica) Stephen Williams	Waterhouse	7

Goal totals reflect statistics up to suspension of 2019–20 season.
