= 2021 Jamaica Premier League =

Jamaican football league

Jamaica Premier League
- Season: 2021
- Champions: Cavalier (2nd title)
- Caribbean Club Championship: Cavalier; Waterhouse
- Matches: 65
- Goals: 147 (2.26 per match)
- Top goalscorer: (Jamaica) Oquassa Chong (Jamaica) Jourdaine Fletcher (Jamaica) Shaqueil Bradford (6 goals each)
- Biggest home win: 3 goals: Portmore United 3–0 Humble Lions; Waterhouse 4–1 Arnett Gardens
- Biggest away win: 3 goals: Arnett Gardens 0–3 Cavalier; Dunbeholden 2–5 Mount Pleasant; Molynes United 1–4 Waterhouse
- Highest scoring: 7 goals: Dunbeholden 2–5 Mount Pleasant; Tivoli Gardens 4–3 Humble Lions
- Longest winning run: 4 matches Waterhouse
- Longest unbeaten run: 7 matches Tivoli Gardens
- Longest winless run: 5 matches Humble Lions
- Longest losing run: 5 matches Humble Lions

The 2021 Jamaica Premier League is the 47th season of the top division football competition in Jamaica, and the first season since rebranding as the Jamaica Premier League (formerly called the National Premier League). The season kicked off on 26 June 2021. The season operated with a shortened schedule due to impacts from the COVID-19 pandemic, following the cancellation of the 2019–20 season.

== Teams ==
In May 2021, the Jamaican Football Federation announced that the Jamaica Premier League would resume, playing a shortened season between June and September, competed by the 12 teams from the previous season In June 2021, UWI F.C. announced it would withdraw ahead of the 2021 season due to the modified schedule conflicting with other player commitments; leaving 11 teams in the competition.

Location of teams in the 2021 Jamaica Premier League

Team	Location	Stadium	Stadium Capacity	Manager
Arnett Gardens	Kingston	Anthony Spaulding Sports Complex	7,000	(Jamaica) Alex Thomas
Cavalier	Kingston	Stadium East	2,000	(Jamaica) Rudolph Speid
Dunbeholden	Portmore	Prison Oval	2,000	(Jamaica) Harold Thomas
Harbour View	Kingston	Harbour View Mini Stadium	7,000	(Jamaica) Ludlow Bernard
Humble Lions	Clarendon	Effortville Community Centre	1,000	(Jamaica) Andrew Price
Molynes United	Kingston	Jacisera Park		(Jamaica) Anthony Patrick
Mount Pleasant F.A.	Runaway Bay, St. Ann	Drax Hall Sports Complex, Drax Hall	2,000	(England) Wally Downes
Portmore United	Portmore	Ferdie Neita Sports Complex	3,000	(Jamaica) Garnett Lawrence
Tivoli Gardens	Kingston	Railway Oval	3,000	(Jamaica) Phillip Williams
Vere United	Clarendon	Wembley Centre of Excellence		(Jamaica) Howard Cephas
Waterhouse	Kingston	Waterhouse Stadium	5,000	(Jamaica) Marcel Gayle

Note: UWI F.C. withdrew prior to beginning of season.

== Regular season ==
=== Format ===
The 2021 season will operate under a modified compressed schedule where each team will play each other once during the preliminary round of the competition. At the end of the preliminary round, teams will be separated into two tiers with the bottom six teams playing each other once in a round-robin format to determine rank. For the top tier, the top two teams will automatically advance to the semi-finals, while the other four teams will play for the remaining semi-finals spots. No team will face relegation during the 2021 season.

Four venues have been approved for matches:

- Independence Park (preferred)
- Sabina Park (preferred)
- Stadium East (alternate)
- Captain Horace Burrell Centre of Excellence (alternate)

Captain Horace Burrell Centre of Excellence was selected to host all five matches kicking off the 2021 season.

==== League table ====
Pos	Team	Pld	W	L	T	GF	GA	GD	Pts	Qualification or relegation
1	Waterhouse	10	5	1	4	18	8	+10	19	Advance to Playoffs (Semifinals)
2	Cavalier	10	5	2	3	16	9	+7	18	Advance to Playoffs (Semifinals)
3	Mount Pleasant	10	5	2	3	13	10	+3	18	Advance to Playoffs (Playoff)
4	Tivoli Gardens	10	4	1	5	14	11	+3	17	Advance to Playoffs (Playoff)
5	Vere United	10	4	3	3	9	7	+2	15	Advance to Playoffs (Playoff)
6	Harbour View	10	4	3	3	12	11	+1	15	Advance to Playoffs (Playoff)
7	Dunbeholden	10	4	4	2	12	16	−4	14	Advance to Bottom Tier
8	Portmore United	10	4	5	1	11	9	+2	13	Advance to Bottom Tier
9	Arnett Gardens	10	2	6	2	8	15	−7	8	Advance to Bottom Tier
10	Molynes United	10	1	5	4	8	16	−8	7	Advance to Bottom Tier
11	Humble Lions	10	2	8	0	10	19	−9	6	Advance to Bottom Tier

Updated to match(es) played on 11 September 2021. Source: Jamaica Premier League

=== Results ===
Home \ Away	ARN	CAV	DUN	HAR	HUM	MOL	MTP	POR	TIV	VER	WAT
Arnett Gardens	—	0–3	1–1		1–0			3–1			
Cavalier		—	0–1		2–0		2–3	1–0			
Dunbeholden			—		2–1	3–1	2–5			2–1	0–2
Harbour View	1–0	1–1	2–0	—		1–0		1–1	1–3		
Humble Lions				2–0	—	0–1	0–1			1–3	2–1
Molynes United	1–1	1–3				—					1–4
Mount Pleasant	1–0			0–2			—		0–0	0–0	0–2
Portmore United			2–0		3–0	1–0	0–1	—			0–1
Tivoli Gardens	1–0	1–1	1–1		4–3	1–1		1–3	—		
Vere United	1–0	0–1		3–2		0–0		1–0	0–1	—	
Waterhouse	4–1	2–2		1–1					1–1	0–0	—

Updated to match(es) played on 11 September 2021. Source:
Legend: Blue = home team win; Yellow = draw; Red = away team win.

== Playoffs ==
=== Bracket ===
Quarterfinals
3	Mount Pleasant	3	1	4
6	Harbour View	1	1	2
4	Tivoli Gardens	0	4	4
5	Vere United	0	0	0

Semifinals
1	Waterhouse	1	1	2
3	Mount Pleasant F.A.	0	1	1
2	Cavalier	1	0	1
4	Tivoli Gardens	0	0	0

Finals
Waterhouse	1 (4)
Cavalier	1 (5)
3rd place match
Mount Pleasant F.A.	1 (3)
Tivoli Gardens	1 (4)

=== Results ===
==== Quarterfinals ====
18 September 2021

Harbour View	1 - 3	Mount Pleasant
T. Williams 90+4'		D. Campbell 30'; K. Hall 54'; J. Fletcher 75'

Captain Horace Burrell Centre of Excellence
Referee: Steffon Dewar
22 September 2021

Mount Pleasant	1 - 1	Harbour View
J. Fletcher 62'		O. Staple 4'

Captain Horace Burrell Centre of Excellence
Referee: Oshane Nation

Mount Pleasant progresses 4-2 on aggregates.

18 September 2021

Vere United	0 – 0	Tivoli Gardens

Captain Horace Burrell Centre of Excellence
Referee: Veralton Nembhard
22 September 2021

Tivoli Gardens	4 - 0	Vere United
S. Barnett 18'; T. Reid 62'; H. Morgan 86'; J. Johnson 90+5' (pen.)

Captain Horace Burrell Centre of Excellence
Referee: Daneon Parchment

Tivoli Gardens progresses 4-0 on aggregates.

==== Semifinals ====
25 September 2021

Tivoli Gardens	0 – 1	Cavalier
		C. Anderson 85'

Captain Horace Burrell Centre of Excellence
Referee: Christopher Mason
29 September 2021

Cavalier	0 – 0	Tivoli Gardens

Captain Horace Burrell Centre of Excellence
Referee: Odette Hamilton

Cavalier progresses 1-0 on aggregate

25 September 2021

Mount Pleasant	0 – 1	Waterhouse
		S. Bradford 79'

Captain Horace Burrell Centre of Excellence
Referee: Veralton Nembhard
29 September 2021

Waterhouse	1 – 1	Mount Pleasant
R. Thomas 45+3'		J. Fletcher 6'

Captain Horace Burrell Centre of Excellence
Referee: Steffon Dewar

Waterhouse progresses 2-1 on aggregates

==== Third Place Game ====
2 October 2021

Mount Pleasant	1 – 1 (a.e.t.)	Tivoli Gardens
D. Campbell 27'		T. Reid 48'
Penalties
Fletcher (penalty scored); McCalla (penalty scored); Isaacs (penalty scored); D. Campbell (penalty missed); Rankine (penalty missed)	3-4	Johnson (penalty scored); McQueen (penalty scored); Reid (penalty scored); Wellington (penalty scored)

Captain Horace Burrell Centre of Excellence
Referee: Neressa Goldson

Tivoli Gardens won 1-1(4-3 on penalties)

==== Final ====
2 October 2021

Waterhouse	1 – 1 (a.e.t.)	Cavalier
Damion Binns 90+8' (pen.)		Jamoi Topey 17'
Penalties
Binns (penalty missed); Bradford (penalty scored); Stewart (penalty scored); Leslie (penalty scored); Thomas (penalty scored); Campbell (penalty missed)	4-5	King (penalty scored); Topey (penalty scored); Doxilly (penalty scored); Maxwell (penalty scored); Laing (penalty missed); Purcell (penalty scored)

Captain Horace Burrell Centre of Excellence
Referee: Oshane Nation

Cavalier won 1-1(5-4 on penalties)

== Champions ==
Jamaica Premier League Champions

2nd title

== Top goalscorers ==
Rank	Scorer	Team	Goals
1	(Jamaica) Oquassa Chong	Harbour View	6
1	(Jamaica) Jourdaine Fletcher	Mount Pleasant F.A	6
1	(Jamaica) Shaqueil Bradford	Waterhouse FC	6
4	(Jamaica) Andre Fletcher	Waterhouse FC	5
4	(Jamaica) Damion Binns	Waterhouse FC	5
4	(Jamaica) Nicholas Nelson	Molynes United FC	5
4	(Jamaica) Andrew Vanzie	Humble Lions	5
8	(Jamaica) Kesslon Hall	Mount Pleasant FA	4
8	(Jamaica) Devroy Grey	Tivoli Gardens FC	4
8	(Jamaica) Horatio Morgan	Tivoli Gardens FC	4
8	(Jamaica) Shaniel Thomas	Cavalier FC	4
