= Daniel Green (Jamaican footballer) =

Jamaican footballer (born 1997)

Personal information
- Full name: Daniel Michael Green
- Date of birth: 10 June 1997 (age 29)
- Place of birth: Jamaica
- Height: 1.78 m (5 ft 10 in)
- Position: Forward

Team information
- Current team: Mount Pleasant

Senior career*
Years	Team	Apps	(Gls)
2016–2018	Harbour View	38	(3)
2018–2022	Mount Pleasant	67	(19)
2022–2023	Hồ Chí Minh City	33	(7)
2023–	Mount Pleasant	133	(34)

International career^{‡}
2019	Jamaica U23	4	(0)
2018–	Jamaica	7	(1)
- * Club domestic league appearances and goals as of 22:53, 4 May 2025 (UTC) ‡ National team caps and goals as of 22:57, 27 May 2025 (UTC)

Daniel Michael Green (born 10 June 1997) is a Jamaican footballer who plays as a forward in the Jamaica Premier League for the club Mount Pleasant and the Jamaica national team.

== Club career ==
Green started his career at Harbour View FC in Kingston, before moving to Mount Pleasant in St. Ann. In 2022, he signed with Ho Chi Minh City in Vietnam before returning to Mount Pleasant in 2023. He was elevated to Mount Pleasant team captain in September 2025.

On October 22, 2026, Green made his 200th appearance for Mount Pleasant.

== International career ==
Green has featured for the Jamaica youth and senior national teams.

== Career statistics ==
=== Club ===
As of 23 May 2025.

Club	Season	League			Cup		Continental		Other		Total	
Club	Season	Division	Apps	Goals	Apps	Goals	Apps	Goals	Apps	Goals	Apps	Goals
Harbour View	2016–17	Jamaica Premier League	15	0	0	0	—		0	0	15	0
Harbour View	2017–18	Jamaica Premier League	23	3	0	0	—		2 (Note: Appearances in Jamaica Premier League playoffs)	0	25	3
Harbour View	Total		38	3	0	0	—		2	0	40	3
Mount Pleasant	2018–19	Jamaica Premier League	18	4	0	0	—		4	0	22	4
Mount Pleasant	2019–20	Jamaica Premier League	23	2	0	0	—		0	0	23	2
Mount Pleasant	2020–21	Jamaica Premier League	8	1	0	0	—		3	0	11	1
Mount Pleasant	2021–22	Jamaica Premier League	18	12	0	0	—		2	1	20	13
Mount Pleasant	Total		67	19	0	0	—		9	1	76	20
Hồ Chí Minh City	2022	V.League 1	15	5	0	0	—		—		15	5
Hồ Chí Minh City	2023	V.League 1	18	2	0	0	—		—		18	2
Hồ Chí Minh City	Total		33	7	0	0	—		—		33	7
Mount Pleasant	2023–24	Jamaica Premier League	18	7	—		—		3	0	21	7
Mount Pleasant	2024–25	Jamaica Premier League	36	14	—		4 (Note: Appearances in CONCACAF Champions Cup)	0	3	0	43	14
Mount Pleasant	Total		54	21	—		4	0	6	0	64	21
Career total			192	50	0	0	4	0	13	1	209	51

=== International ===
As of match played 27 May 2025

National team	Year	Apps	Goals
Jamaica	2018	1	1
Jamaica	2022	4	0
Jamaica	2025	2	0
Total		7	1

=== International goals ===
Scores and results list Jamaica's goal tally first.

No	Date	Venue	Opponent	Score	Result	Competition
1.	29 April 2018	Kirani James Athletic Stadium, St. George's, Grenada	Grenada	1–0	5–1	Friendly

== Honors ==
=== Individual ===
- 2022 Jamaica Premier League Golden Boot
