= 2016–17 National Premier League =

National Premier League
- Season: 2016–17
- Matches: 148
- Goals: 311 (2.1 per match)
- Top goalscorer: (Jamaica) Jermaine Johnson: 16 goals
- Biggest home win: UWI F.C. 4-0 Boys' Town October 27, 2016, Reno F.C. 4-0 Boys' Town November 6, 2016
- Biggest away win: Boys' Town 0-4 Tivoli Gardens November 27, 2016
- Highest scoring: Maverley Hughenden 2-3 Jamalco September 25, 2016; UWI F.C. 3-2 Arnett Gardens October 16, 2016; Boys' Town 2-3 UWI F.C. November 20, 2016
- Longest winning run: Montego Bay United: 5 games
- Longest unbeaten run: Montego Bay United: 5 games
- Longest losing run: Jamalco: 6 games

The 2016–17 Red Stripe Premier League is the highest competitive football league in Jamaica. It is the 43rd edition of the competition. It started on September 4, 2016. For this season the teams qualifying for the playoffs were increased from four to six teams. Teams ranked from one to two would get a bye to the semi-final round and teams ranked 3 and 6 will play a two leg tie along with teams ranked 4 and 5 for the quarterfinal stage. The two legged tie still remains for the semi-final stage.

== Changes from 2015–2016 ==
- Maverley Hughenden and Jamalco were promoted from the Jamaican Major Leagues (second tier football).
- Rivoli United and Cavalier were relegated to the Jamaican Major Leagues (second tier football).

== Teams ==
Team information.

Team	Location	Stadium	Stadium Capacity	Manager
Arnett Gardens	Kingston	Anthony Spaulding Sports Complex	7,000	(Jamaica) Jerome Waite
Boys' Town	Kingston	Collie Smith Drive Sporting Complex	2,000	(Jamaica) Andrew Price
Harbour View	Kingston	Harbour View Mini Stadium	7,000	(Jamaica) Ludlow Bernard
Humble Lions	Clarendon	Effortville Community Centre	1,000	(Jamaica) Donovan Duckie
Jamalco	Clarendon	Wembley Centre of Excellence	1,000	(Jamaica) Rayon Johnson
Maverley Hughenden	Kingston	Constant Spring Football Field	3,000	(Jamaica) Anthony Patrick
Montego Bay United	Montego Bay	Montego Bay Sports Complex, WesPow Park	9,000	(Jamaica) Dillon Thelwell (Interim)
Portmore United	Portmore	Ferdie Neita Sports Complex	3,000	(Jamaica) Linval Dixon
Reno F.C.	Westmoreland Parish	Frome	2,000	(Jamaica) Wendell Downswell
Tivoli Gardens	Kingston	Railway Oval	3,000	(Jamaica) Omar Edwards
UWI F.C.	Kingston	UWI Bowl	2,000	(Jamaica) Marcel Gayle
Waterhouse	Kingston	Waterhouse Stadium	5,000	(Jamaica) Admiral Bailey

== Managerial Changes ==
Manager	Club	Status	Date	Replacement
(Jamaica) Anthony Patrick (Interim)	Waterhouse	End of caretaker spell	May 2016	(Jamaica) Marvin Tate
(Jamaica) Paul 'Tegat' Davis	Montego Bay United	End of caretaker spell	July 2016	(Serbia) Slaviša Božičić
(Jamaica) Marvin Tate	Waterhouse	Sacked	November 2016	(Jamaica) Admiral Bailey
(Jamaica) Lijyasu Simms	Maverley Hughenden	Sacked	December 2016	(Jamaica) Anthony Patrick
(Serbia) Slaviša Božičić	Montego Bay United	Step Down	December 2016	(Jamaica) Dillon Thelwell (Interim)

== League table ==
Pos	Team	Pld	W	D	L	GF	GA	GD	Pts	Qualification or relegation
1	Humble Lions	33	17	10	6	44	21	+23	61	Qualification for Semi-Finals
2	UWI	33	17	8	8	42	28	+14	59	Qualification for Semi-Finals
3	Montego Bay United	33	16	8	9	39	26	+13	56	Qualification for Quarterfinals
4	Portmore United	33	14	13	6	43	30	+13	55	Qualification for Quarterfinals
5	Tivoli Gardens	33	17	4	12	44	34	+10	55	Qualification for Quarterfinals
6	Arnett Gardens	33	13	7	13	47	46	+1	46	Qualification for Quarterfinals
7	Reno	33	10	9	14	28	34	−6	39	
8	Waterhouse	33	10	7	16	26	32	−6	37	
9	Harbour View	33	9	9	15	31	45	−14	36	
10	Boys' Town	33	10	6	17	35	56	−21	36	
11	Maverley Hughenden	33	7	14	12	26	35	−9	35	Relegation to Regional confederations
12	Jamalco	33	9	3	21	29	47	−18	30	Relegation to Regional confederations

Rules for classification: 1) points; 2) goal difference; 3) number of goals scored.

== Playoffs ==
=== Results ===
==== Quarterfinals ====
23 April 2017
16:00

Tivoli Gardens	1–1	Portmore United
Morris 85'	Report	East 39'

Railway Oval, Kingston
Referee: Odette Hamilton
30 April 2017
15:00

Portmore United	2-1	Tivoli Gardens
East 5'; Grandison 40'	Report	Pryce 23'

Wembley Centre of Excellence, Hayes
Referee: Kevin Morrison

24 April 2017
20:00

Arnett Gardens	1–1	Montego Bay United
Anderson 74'	Report	Kirlew 68'

Anthony Spaulding Sports Complex, Kingston
Referee: Karl Tyrell
1 May 2017
20:00

Montego Bay United	1-2	Arnett Gardens
Williams 63'	Report	Reid 17' 76'

Catherine Hall Sports Complex, Montego Bay
Referee: Karl Tyrell

==== Semi-finals ====
7 May 2017
15:00

Portmore United	1–2	UWI
Wayne 5'	Report	G. Brown 23'; P. Brown 69'

Wembley Centre of Excellence, Hayes
28 May 2017
15:00

UWI	0–2 (a.e.t.)	Portmore United
	Report	Foster 82'; Binns 116'

UWI Bowl, Kingston

8 May 2017
20:00

Arnett Gardens	2 - 1	Humble Lions
F. Reid 45'; Harris 60'	Report	K. Reid 62'

Anthony Spaulding Sports Complex, Kingston
21 May 2017
15:00

Humble Lions	0 - 1	Arnett Gardens
	Report	F. Reid 72'

Effortville Community Centre, May Pen

==== Final ====
5 June 2017
20:30

Portmore United F.C.	1 - 2	Arnett Gardens
Foster 2'	Report [ Report]	Anderson 55'; Morgan 65'

Independence Park, Kingston
Attendance: 20, 000

== Top goalscorers ==
Updated as of March 4, 2017

Rank	Scorer	Team	Goals
1	(Jamaica) Jermaine Johnson	Tivoli Gardens	16
2	(Jamaica) Shamar Nicholson	Boys' Town	11
3	(Jamaica) Elton Thpmpson	Tivoli Gardens	7
4	(Jamaica) Dino Williams	Montego Bay United	7
5	(Jamaica) Afiba Chambers	Reno	6
6	(Jamaica) Rochane Smith	UWI	6
7	(Jamaica) Francis Swaby	Humble Lions	6
8	(Jamaica) Kemar Beckford	Waterhouse	5
9	(Jamaica) Anthony Greenland	UWI	5
10	(Jamaica) Lennox Russell	Arnett Gardens	5
