= Ajeanie Talbott =

Jamaican footballer (born 1998)

Personal information
- Full name: Ajeanie Khadeem Talbott
- Date of birth: 27 March 1998 (age 28)
- Place of birth: Kingston, Jamaica
- Height: 1.83 m (6 ft 0 in)
- Position: Defender

Team information
- Current team: Harbour View
- Number: 17

Youth career
- 2014–2015: Cavalier

Senior career*
Years	Team	Apps	(Gls)
2015–	Harbour View	140	(1)
2021–2022	→ São João de Ver (Loan)		

International career^{‡}
2015	Jamaica U17	10	(0)
2017	Jamaica U20	2	(0)
2019	Jamaica U23	7	(0)
2018–	Jamaica	4	(0)
- * Club domestic league appearances and goals as of 22:53, 25 January 2019 (UTC) ‡ National team caps and goals as of 22:53, 25 January 2019 (UTC)

Ajeanie Khadeem Talbott (born 27 March 1998) is a Jamaican footballer who plays as a defender for São João de Ver and the Jamaica national football team.

== Early life and education ==
Talbott was born in Kingston and played for Jamaica College in secondary school.

== Career ==
=== Club ===
Following a move from Cavalier youth set up in 2015, Talbott made his professional debut for Harbour view in the same year. Following the resumption of football due to the COVID-19 virus, Talbott was named as the new captain for Harbour view ahead of the 2021 season.

On 15 September 2021, Portuguese club Sporting Clube Sao Joao De Ver announced the signing of Talbott on a 3-month loan.

=== International ===
Talbott has represented Jamaica at the youth and senior levels. He represented Jamaica at the U17, U20 and U23 age groups, captaining both the U17 and U23 teams. In 2018, at just 20-years-old, Talbott received his first call up to the Jamaican senior national team from head coach Theodore Whitmore, starting back to back friendly internationals against Grenada and Barbados. In 2019, Talbott was selected as part of Jamaica's provisional roster from the 2019 CONCACAF Gold Cup.

== Career statistics ==
=== Club ===
As of 25 January 2019.

Club	Season	League			Cup		Other		Total	
Club	Season	Division	Apps	Goals	Apps	Goals	Apps	Goals	Apps	Goals
Harbour View	2014–15	National Premier League	1	0	0	0	0	0	1	0
Harbour View	2016–17	National Premier League	3	0	0	0	0	0	3	0
Harbour View	2017–18	National Premier League	25	0	0	0	0	0	25	0
Harbour View	2018–19	National Premier League	30	0	0	0	0	0	30	0
Harbour View	2019–20	National Premier League	15	0	0	0	0	0	15	0
Harbour View	2021	National Premier League	10	0	0	0	0	0	10	0
Harbour View	2022	National Premier League	1	0	0	0	0	0	1	0
Total club			85	0	0	0	0	0	85	0
Total			85	0	0	0	0	0	85	0

=== International ===
As of match played 25 January 2019.

Jamaica
Year	Apps	Goals
2018	2	0
2019	1	0
2020	1	0
Total	4	0
