= 2018–19 National Premier League =

National Premier League
- Season: 2018–19
- Champions: Portmore United; 7th title
- Relegated: Montego Bay United; Reno
- Caribbean Club Championship: Portmore United; Waterhouse
- Matches: 198
- Goals: 434 (2.19 per match)
- Biggest home win: Waterhouse 4-0 Harbour View; Cavalier 5-1 Montego Bay United; Tivoli Gardens 5-1 Harbour View
- Biggest away win: Harbour View 1-5 Waterhouse; Reno 0-4 Tivoli Gardens; Montego Bay United 1-5 Portmore United
- Highest scoring: Humble Lions 3-4 Dunbeholden; Reno 3-4 Portmore United

The 2018–19 Red Stripe Premier League was the 45th season of the National Premier League, the top division football competition in Jamaica. The season began on 16 September 2018 and ended on 29 April 2019. Portmore United were the defending champions, having won their 6th title the previous season.

== Teams ==
Sandals South Coast FC and Boys' Town finished 11th and 12th in last season's competition and were relegated to their respective regional Super Leagues, the Western Super League and KSAFA Super League respectively.

At the end of last season, the champions of the four Super Leagues participated in a promotion playoff double round robin tournament. Dunbeholden F.C. and Mount Pleasant Football Academy finished 1st and 2nd after the playoff and were promoted to the National Premier League for this season.

Location of teams in the 2018–19 National Premier League

Team	Location	Stadium	Stadium Capacity	Manager
Arnett Gardens	Kingston	Anthony Spaulding Sports Complex	7,000	(Jamaica) Jerome Waite
Cavalier	Kingston	Stadium East	2,000	(Jamaica) Rudolph Speid
Dunbeholden	Portmore	TBD	2,000	(Jamaica) Michael Cohen
Harbour View	Kingston	Harbour View Mini Stadium	7,000	(Jamaica) Fabian Taylor
Humble Lions	Clarendon	Effortville Community Centre	1,000	(Jamaica) Admiral Bailey
Montego Bay United	Montego Bay	Montego Bay Sports Complex, WesPow Park	9,000	(Jamaica)
Mount Pleasant F.A.	Runaway Bay, St. Ann	Drax Hall Sports Complex, Drax Hall	2,000	(Jamaica) Donovan Duckie
Portmore United	Portmore	Ferdie Neita Sports Complex	3,000	(Jamaica) Shavar Thomas
Reno	Savanna-la-Mar	Frome Sports Club	2,000	(Jamaica) Wendell Downswell
Tivoli Gardens	Kingston	Railway Oval	3,000	(Jamaica) Omar Edwards
UWI	Kingston	UWI Bowl	2,000	(Jamaica) Andrew Peart
Waterhouse	Kingston	Waterhouse Stadium	5,000	(Jamaica) Marcel Gayle

== Regular season ==
Pos	Team	Pld	W	D	L	GF	GA	GD	Pts	Qualification or relegation
1	Portmore United	33	19	9	5	53	27	+26	66	Advance to Playoffs (Semifinals)
2	Waterhouse	33	17	11	5	47	24	+23	62	Advance to Playoffs (Semifinals)
3	Mount Pleasant	33	17	9	7	32	19	+13	60	Advance to Playoffs (Quarterfinals)
4	Cavalier	33	14	12	7	38	24	+14	54	Advance to Playoffs (Quarterfinals)
5	Arnett Gardens	33	13	9	11	39	33	+6	48	Advance to Playoffs (Quarterfinals)
6	UWI	33	13	7	13	32	31	+1	46	Advance to Playoffs (Quarterfinals)
7	Tivoli Gardens	33	11	6	16	36	42	−6	39	
8	Humble Lions	33	9	11	13	36	38	−2	38	
9	Harbour View	33	7	14	12	33	48	−15	35	
10	Dunbeholden	33	8	9	16	33	42	−9	33	
11	Montego Bay United (R)	33	7	9	17	31	55	−24	30	Relegated to Regional confederations
12	Reno (R)	33	4	12	17	24	51	−27	24	Relegated to Regional confederations

Source: Soccerway
(R) Relegated

== Results ==
=== Regular home games ===
Home \ Away	ARN	CAV	DUN	HAR	HUM	MBU	MTP	POR	REN	TIV	UWI	WAT
Arnett Gardens	—	1–3	2–0	2–1	2–1	0–0	1–0	2–3	2–0	1–0	2–2	0–1
Cavalier	2–1	—	1–1	1–2	0–0	5–1	1–1	0–2	0–0	3–0	1–1	1–0
Dunbeholden	1–3	1–1	—	0–1	1–1	0–1	0–2	2–3	3–0	2–1	0–1	0–0
Harbour View	1–1	1–0	1–1	—	1–0	1–2	1–2	0–2	1–1	1–1	0–1	1–5
Humble Lions	2–1	2–0	3–4	2–0	—	2–1	0–0	1–1	1–0	2–0	0–1	1–1
Montego Bay United	1–2	2–1	2–3	0–3	1–1	—	1–1	1–5	0–0	0–2	1–3	1–1
Mount Pleasant	1–0	0–1	0–1	0–2	0–1	2–0	—	1–1	1–0	1–1	1–0	1–0
Portmore United	3–0	1–0	2–0	1–1	0–0	1–0	1–2	—	4–3 (Note: This match between Reno and Portmore United on 25 November 2018 was played at the Frome Sports Complex, which is Reno's home ground.)	0–1	1–1	0–0
Reno	1–2	0–2	2–1	0–0	2–2	1–1	0–0	0–2	—	0–4	1–0	1–0
Tivoli Gardens	0–2	0–2	1–0	1–1	1–3	2–1	0–1	3–2	2–1	—	0–1	1–2
UWI	3–0	1–0	1–0	2–2	1–0	1–2	0–1	0–1	2–2	0–1	—	0–1 (Note: The match between UWI and Waterhouse on 4 November 2018 was abandoned in the 4th minute due to a waterlogged pitch. The match was resumed and finished on 15 November 2018.)
Waterhouse	1–1	2–2	1–0	4–0	3–2	2–1	0–0	2–2	2–0	1–1	0–0	—

Source: Soccerway
Legend: Blue = home team win; Yellow = draw; Red = away team win.
For upcoming matches, an "a" indicates there is an article about the rivalry between the two participants.

=== Additional home games ===
Home \ Away	ARN	CAV	DUN	HAR	HUM	MBU	MTP	POR	REN	TIV	UWI	WAT
Arnett Gardens	—	—	0–0	—	3–0	3–0	0–0	0–1	1–1	—	—	—
Cavalier	0–0	—	1–1	—	—	2–1	—	2–1	0–0	—	—	—
Dunbeholden	—	—	—	—	2–1	2–1	1–2	0–1	—	1–1	0–2	—
Harbour View	0–0	0–2	1–1	—	—	—	—	—	1–1	—	—	1–3
Humble Lions	—	1–1	—	2–2	—	1–1	0–1	0–2	—	—	—	0–1
Montego Bay United	—	—	—	3–3	—	—	1–0	—	—	0–0	2–0	0–3
Mount Pleasant	—	0–0	—	2–1	—	—	—	—	—	2–1	2–0	2–0
Portmore United	—	—	—	0–0	—	1–0	1–0	—	—	2–0	1–2	—
Reno	—	—	0–3	—	0–3 (Note: The match between Reno and Humble Lions on 20 March 2019 was awarded 0-3 due to Reno not showing up for the match.)	1–2	2–3	2–4	—	—	1–1	—
Tivoli Gardens	0–3	0–1	—	5–1	2–0	—	—	—	0–1	—	—	2–4
UWI	3–1	0–1	—	0–1	2–1	—	—	—	—	0–2	—	0–2
Waterhouse	1–0	0–1	2–1	—	—	—	—	1–1	1–0	—	—	—

Source: Soccerway
Legend: Blue = home team win; Yellow = draw; Red = away team win.
For upcoming matches, an "a" indicates there is an article about the rivalry between the two participants.

== Playoffs ==
=== Bracket ===
Quarterfinals
3	Mount Pleasant F.A.	2	1	3
6	UWI	2	0	2
4	Cavalier	3	0	3
5	Arnett Gardens	0	0	0

Semifinals
1	Portmore United	2	1	3
3	Mount Pleasant F.A.	1	1	2
2	Waterhouse	2	1	3
4	Cavalier	0	0	0

Finals
1	Portmore United	1
2	Waterhouse	0

=== Results ===
==== Quarterfinals ====
24 March 2019
17:00 UTC-5

UWI	2 – 2	Mount Pleasant F.A.
R. Reid 21'; R. Miller 67' (pen.)		S. McCalla 60'; F. Swaby 81' (pen.)

Anthony Spaulding Sports Complex
31 March 2019
15:00 UTC-5

Mount Pleasant F.A.	1 – 0	UWI
F. Swaby 27' (pen.)

Drax Hall Sports Complex

Mount Pleasant F.A. progresses 3-2 on aggregate.

24 March 2019
20:00 UTC-5

Arnett Gardens	0 – 3	Cavalier
		C. Marsh 15'; A. Marshall 77'; N. Hamilton 87'

Anthony Spaulding Sports Complex
Referee: Oshane Nation
1 April 2019
20:35 UTC-5

Cavalier	0 – 0	Arnett Gardens

Waterhouse Stadium
Referee: Odette Hamilton

Cavalier progresses 3-0 on aggregate.

==== Semifinals ====
The winners of these ties will qualify for the Caribbean Club Championship.

8 April 2019
17:30 UTC-5

Mount Pleasant F.A.	1 – 2	Portmore United
J. Fletcher 48'		43' J. East; R. Sharpe 90+2'

Independence Park
Referee: Daneon Parchment
15 April 2019
20:35 UTC-5

Portmore United	1 – 1	Mount Pleasant F.A.
J. East 22'		90+2' S. McCalla

Independence Park
Referee: Oshane Nation

Portmore United progress 3-2 on aggregate.

8 April 2019
20:35 UTC-5

Cavalier	0 – 2	Waterhouse
		34' K. Simpson; 40' T. Stewart

Independence Park
Referee: Odette Hamilton
15 April 2019
17:30 UTC-5

Waterhouse	1 – 0	Cavalier
K. Daley 46'

Independence Park

Waterhouse progresses 3-0 on aggregate.

==== Third-place game ====
29 April 2019
17:30 UTC-5

Cavalier	1 – 0	Mount Pleasant F.A.
A. Marshall 41'

Independence Park

==== Finals ====
29 April 2019
20:35 UTC-5

Portmore United	1 – 0	Waterhouse
R. Morris 51'

Independence Park
Referee: Odette Hamilton

== Top goalscorers ==
Rank	Scorer	Team	Goals
1	(Jamaica) Javon East	Portmore United	12
1	(Jamaica) Colorado Murray	Tivoli Gardens	12
1	(Jamaica) Tremaine Stewart	Waterhouse	12
4	(Jamaica) Fabian Reid	Arnett Gardens	11
4	(Jamaica) Francois Swaby	Mount Pleasant	11
6	(Jamaica) Alex Marshall	Cavalier	10
7	(Jamaica) Kenroy Howell	Waterhouse	12
7	(Jamaica) Nicholas Hamilton	Cavalier	9
7	(Jamaica) Rondee Smith	Portmore United	9
10	(Jamaica) Deshane Beckford	Montego Bay United	8
