= Trivante Stewart =

Jamaican footballer (born 2000)

Personal information
- Full name: Trivante Vicent Stewart
- Date of birth: 22 March 2000 (age 26)
- Place of birth: Spanish Town, Jamaica
- Height: 1.91 m (6 ft 3 in)
- Position: Forward

Team information
- Current team: Gaziantep (on loan from Maccabi Haifa)
- Number: 9

Youth career
- DB Basovak

Senior career*
Years	Team	Apps	(Gls)
2019–2020	UWI	20	(4)
2022	Molynes United	8	(2)
2022–2023	Mount Pleasant	38	(24)
2023–2024	Salernitana	4	(0)
2024	→ Javor Ivanjica (loan)	17	(3)
2024–2025	Radnički Niš	33	(13)
2025–	Maccabi Haifa	29	(11)
2026–	→ Gaziantep (loan)	4	(0)

International career^{‡}
2022–2023	Jamaica	4	(0)
- * Club domestic league appearances and goals as of 11 October 2026 ‡ National team caps and goals as of 4 August 2026

Trivante Vicent Stewart (born 22 March 2000) is a Jamaican professional footballer who plays as a forward for Turkish Süper Lig club Gaziantep on loan from Maccabi Haifa, and the Jamaica national team.

== Amateur and school career ==
Stewart started his career with DB Basovak in his hometown of Spanish Town before going on to play football at Innswood High School and Charlie Smith High School, the latter of which he represented in the Manning Cup.

== Professional career ==
He started his professional career with UWI, before a move to Molynes United in 2022. Mid-way through the 2022 season, he moved to Mount Pleasant, where he flourished, scoring five goals in his first four games for the Saint Ann Parish-based club.

On 17 August 2023, Stewart officially joined Italian side Salernitana on a permanent deal, signing a three-year contract with the club, with a further option. In the process, he became the first Jamaican footballer to ever play in Serie A (Note: as Ravel Morrison and Rolando Aarons represented England at the time they were playing in Serie A), as well as the first one to join it from his own national league. On 1 October 2023, Trivante made his debut for Salernitana, coming on as a substitute in the 79th minute against Inter Milan. However, Salernitana lost 4–0, with Lautaro Martinez, himself a substitute, scoring all four goals.

On 15 February 2024, Stewart was loaned out to Serbian club Javor Ivanjica with an option to buy. After completing his loan at Javor Ivanjica, Stewart was permanently sold by Salernitana to another Serbian club, Radnički Niš in July 2024. On 15 July 2025, Stewart left Radnički Niš for Maccabi Haifa in the Israeli Premier League with a transfer fee of €1.5 million, a record sale for Radnički Niš.

== International career ==
His JPL performances earned him a call-up to the Jamaica national team.

== Career statistics ==
=== Club ===
As of 25 June 2025

Appearances and goals by club, season and competition
Club	Season	League			Cup		Other		Total	
Club	Season	Division	Apps	Goals	Apps	Goals	Apps	Goals	Apps	Goals
UWI	2019–20	National Premier League	20	4	0	0	0	0	20	4
Molynes United	2022	Jamaica Premier League	8	2	0	0	0	0	8	2
Mount Pleasant	2022	Jamaica Premier League	12	6	0	0	0	0	12	6
Mount Pleasant	2022–23	Jamaica Premier League	26	18	0	0	0	0	26	18
Mount Pleasant	Total		38	24	0	0	0	0	38	24
Salernitana	2023–24	Serie A	4	0	1	0	0	0	5	0
Javor Ivanjica (loan)	2023–24	Serbian SuperLiga	17	3	0	0	2	0	19	3
Radnički Niš	2024–25	Serbian SuperLiga	33	13	3	2	2	1	38	16
Maccabi Haifa	2025–26	Israeli Premier League	0	0	0	0	0	0	0	0
Career total			120	46	4	2	4	1	128	49

=== International ===
As of match played 25 March 2025

National team	Year	Apps	Goals
Jamaica	2022	1	0
Jamaica	2023	3	0
Total		4	0

== Honors ==
Mount Pleasant

- Jamaica Premier League: 2022–23
