= Alex Marshall (footballer) =

Jamaican footballer (born 1998)

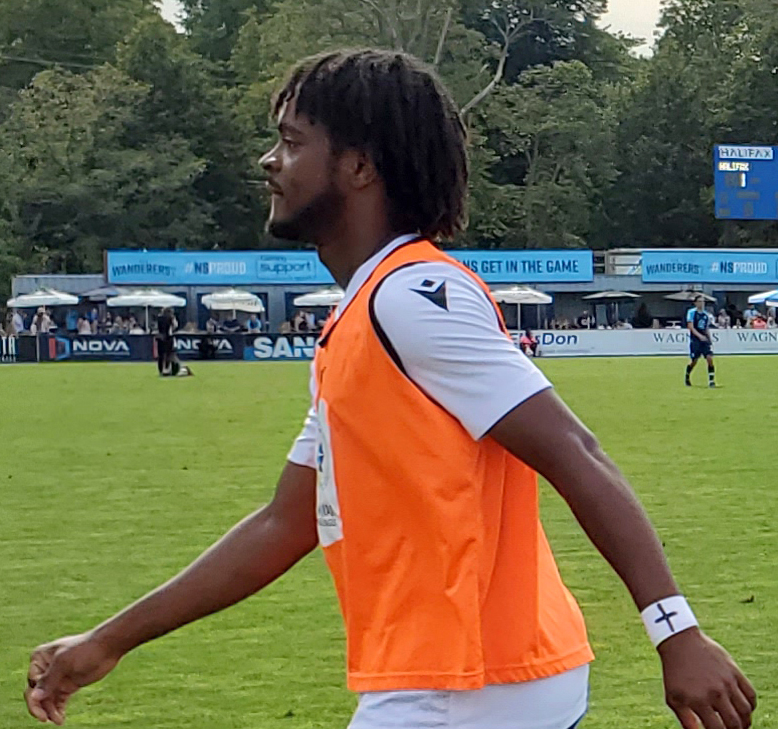
- Marshall with HFX Wanderers in 2022

Personal information
- Full name: Alexander Andre Marshall
- Date of birth: 24 February 1998 (age 28)
- Place of birth: Kingston, Jamaica
- Height: 1.75 m (5 ft 9 in)
- Position: Left winger

Team information
- Current team: Mount Pleasant

Senior career*
Years	Team	Apps	(Gls)
2014–2020	Cavalier	66	(21)
2020–2022	HFX Wanderers	50	(2)
2023–2024	Portmore United	38	(8)
2024-	Mount Pleasant	1	(0)

International career^{‡}
2014–2015	Jamaica U17	9	(7)
2019	Jamaica U23	2	(0)
2017–	Jamaica	14	(0)
- * Club domestic league appearances and goals as of 11:16, 21 December 2024 (UTC) ‡ National team caps and goals as of 30 June 2024

Alexander Andre Marshall (born 24 February 1998) is a Jamaican professional footballer who plays for Mount Pleasant as a winger.

== Club career ==
=== Early career ===
Born in Kingston, Marshall attended St. George's College.

=== Cavalier ===
Marshall made his senior debut for Cavalier in the 2014–15 season, but did not make another senior appearance until after the club was relegated from the National Premier League in the 2015–16 season. In 2015 he trained with American club Philadelphia Union. In the KSAFA Super League, Marshall scored three goals in league play and in May 2017 he scored in the KSAFA Super League final, a 2–1 win over Santos, earning Cavalier promotion back to the National Premier League.

In the 2017–18 season, Marshall made 30 league appearances, scoring seven goals. In October 2018 he was linked with a transfer to a number of English Premier League clubs, including Leicester City, Aston Villa, Tottenham Hotspur, Liverpool and West Ham United.

The following season, Marshall made 34 appearances, scoring eleven goals. In February 2019, he spent a month on trial with Greek Super League side Aris Thessaloniki. In the 2019–20 season, he made ten appearances and scored three goals before departing Cavalier mid-season.

=== HFX Wanderers ===
On 29 January 2020, Marshall signed with Canadian Premier League club HFX Wanderers. He made his Wanderers debut on 15 August against Pacific FC Marshall scored his first goal for the Wanderers during the 2021 season, scoring the opener in a 1–1 draw with Forge FC on 22 August. The Wanderers announced in January 2022 that they had re-signed Marshall to a new deal through 2023. After the conclusion of the 2022 CPL season, HFX announced they had declined Marhsall's contract option, ending his time with the club.

=== Portmore United ===
Marshall joined Portmore United in January 2023. Marshall won the inaugural Lynk Cup knockout competition in his first season at Portmore United, playing an influential role in the club's success.

=== Mount Pleasant ===
In August 2024, Marshall was signed by Mount Pleasant Football Academy. On 15 September in the first game of the 2024-25 Jamaica Premier league against his former club Portmore United. Marshall was substituted midway through the first half, having broken his leg.

== International career ==
=== Youth ===
Marshall represented Jamaica at the 2014 CFU Men's U-17 Tournament, scoring seven goals, and was named the tournament's Most Valuable Player. In the opening match of the tournament against the U.S. Virgin Islands, he scored a hat-trick in a 19–0 victory. In the second group stage match against the Cayman Islands, Marshall scored another hat-trick in a 5–3 win.

Marshall made five appearances at the 2015 CONCACAF U-17 Championship, including the playoff loss on penalties to the United States, which saw Jamaica miss out on qualification for the 2015 FIFA U-17 World Cup.

In July 2019, Marshall played for the Jamaica's U23s in Caribbean qualifying for the 2020 CONCACAF Men's Olympic Qualifying Championship and was named team captain. In the opening match against Dominica, he assisted on Nicque Daley's equalizing goal in a shock 1–1 draw. Marshall also played in the second match against Saint Kitts and Nevis and had some good scoring opportunities, but the match ultimately finished in another 1–1 draw, eliminating Jamaica from qualifying.

=== Senior ===
Marshall trained with the senior national team in May 2017, and made his senior debut later that year.

== Career statistics ==
=== Club ===
As of 20 December 2024

Club statistics
Club	Season	League			National Cup		Other (Note: Includes appearances in the KSAFA Super League Final, National Premier League Playoffs and Canadian Premier League Playoffs.)		Total	
Club	Season	Division	Apps	Goals	Apps	Goals	Apps	Goals	Apps	Goals
Cavalier	2014–15	National Premier League	1	0	0	0	0	0	1	0
Cavalier	2015–16	National Premier League	0	0	—		0	0	0	0
Cavalier	2016–17	KSAFA Super League	?	3	—		1	1	?	4
Cavalier	2017–18	National Premier League	26	6	—		4	1	30	7
Cavalier	2018–19	National Premier League	29	9	—		5	2	34	11
Cavalier	2019–20	National Premier League	10	3	—		0	0	10	3
Cavalier	Total		66	21	0	0	10	4	76	25
HFX Wanderers	2020	Canadian Premier League	10	0	—		1	0	11	0
HFX Wanderers	2021	Canadian Premier League	22	2	1	0	—		23	1
HFX Wanderers	2022	Canadian Premier League	18	0	1	0	—		19	0
HFX Wanderers	Total		50	2	2	0	1	0	53	2
Portmore United	2022–23	National Premier League	16	5	0	0	—		16	5
Portmore United	2023–24	National Premier League	22	3	0	0	—		22	3
Portmore United	Total		38	8	0	0	0	0	38	8
Career total			154	31	2	0	11	4	167	35

=== International ===
As of 30 June 2024

Jamaica national team
Year	Apps	Goals
2017	1	0
2018	6	0
2019	3	0
2020	0	0
2021	0	0
2022	2	0
2024	2	0
Total	14	0

== Honours ==
Cavalier

- KSAFA Super League: 2017

Portmore United

- Lynk Cup: 2023

Individual

- CFU Men's U-17 Tournament MVP: 2014
