= Nicholas Nelson (footballer) =

Jamaican footballer (born 1998)

Personal information
- Full name: Nicholas Anthoney Nelson
- Date of birth: March 23, 1998 (age 28)
- Place of birth: Kingston, Jamaica
- Height: 1.83 m (6 ft 0 in)
- Position: Winger

Team information
- Current team: Dunbeholden
- Number: 10

Youth career
- Hydel High School

Senior career*
| Years | Team | Apps | (Gls) |
| 2013–2015 | Rivoli United | 2 | (0) |
| 2015–2016 | Waterhouse | 9 | (0) |
| 2016–2017 | Molynes United | | |
| 2017 | Maverley Hughenden | 5 | (0) |
| 2017–2018 | Molynes United | | |
| 2018–2019 | Cavalier | 23 | (6) |
| 2019–2022 | Molynes United | 56 | (19) |
| 2022-2023 | Xelajú M. C. | 21 | (2) |
| 2023– | Dunbeholden | 9 | (6) |

International career^{‡}
- Jamaica U-15
- Jamaica U-17
- Jamaica U-20
| 2022– | Jamaica | 1 | (0) |
- * Club domestic league appearances and goals as of 31 December 2023 ‡ National team caps and goals as of 32 December 2023

Nicholas Anthoney Nelson (born November 22, 1998) is a Jamaican footballer. He plays as a right winger for Dunbeholden in the Jamaica Premier League.

== Career ==
=== Schoolboy ===
Nelson was regarded as a star player and prolific striker in schoolboy football while representing Hydel High School.

=== Club ===
Nelson has represented Rivoli United, Waterhouse, Molynes United, Maverley Hughenden, Cavalier and Dunbeholden in the Jamaica Premier League. Nelson was captain of Molynes in 2022 season.

There were speculations that Nelson would sign for a German club at the end of January 2022. Nelson was quoted stating “I don’t know the team I am heading to, but it is in Germany. I will have to keep focused and keep working hard to show there is a lot of talent in Jamaica and in Molynes."

On July 16, 2022, Nelson signed with C.S.D Xelajú M. C. of the Liga Nacional de Fútbol de Guatemala after a successful United States tour with the club. Nelson impressed in friendlies against C.D. Águila of El Salvador and D.C. United of Major League Soccer.

Nelson returned to Jamaica in 2023 signing for Dunbeholden. Nelson scored back-to-back braces for Dunbeholden in the 2023–24 season.

=== International ===
Nelson represented Jamaica at the under-17. He scored a brace against Guadeloupe in the semifinals of the 2014 CFU Men's U-17 Tournament. Also, Nelson scored the winner versus USA in a 1–0 victory in the group stage of the 2015 CONCACAF U-17 Championship.

In 2022 Nelson made his senior team debut for Jamaica in World Cup Qualifiers versus Canada, coming on as a half-time substitute for Lamar Walker.

== Personal life ==
Nelson's older brother, Jermy Nelson, is also a footballer who plays for Molynes United. Both brothers played together at Molynes United in the club's inaugural season in the Jamaica Premier League in 2019.

== Honors ==
=== Individual ===
- 2014 CFU Men's U-17 Tournament Golden Boot
