= Fabian McCarthy (Jamaican footballer) =

Jamaican footballer (born 1990)

Personal information
- Date of birth: 12 May 1990 (age 36)
- Place of birth: Kingston, Jamaica
- Height: 1.85 m (6 ft 1 in)
- Position: Midfielder

Team information
- Current team: Dunbeholden
- Number: 8

Senior career*
Years	Team	Apps	(Gls)
2011–2017	Montego Bay United	121	(19)
2017–2020	UWI F.C.	62	(5)
2021–	Dunbeholden	60	(2)

International career^{‡}
2018–	Jamaica	14	(0)
- * Club domestic league appearances and goals as of 22 March 2024 ‡ National team caps and goals as of 22 March 2024

Fabian McCarthy is a Jamaican footballer who plays for Dunbeholden in the National Premier League. He made his debut for the Jamaica national football team in 2018.

== Career ==
=== International ===
McCarthy plays for Jamaica.
