= Nicholas Hamilton (footballer) =

Jamaican footballer (born 1996)

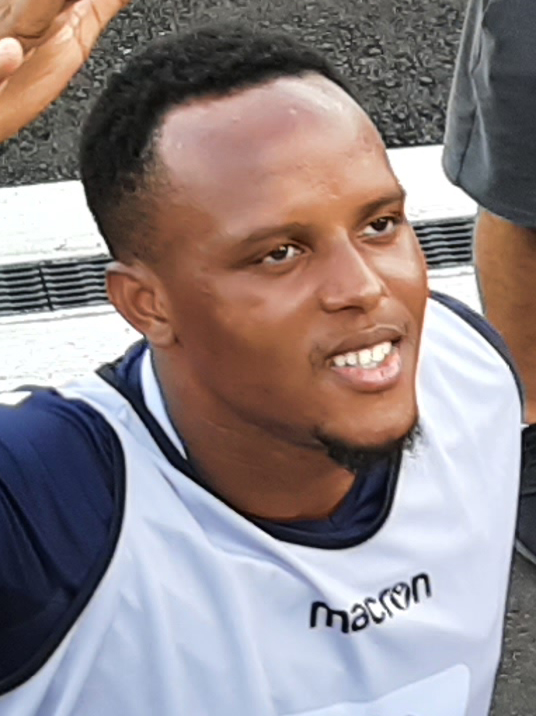
- Hamilton in 2021

Personal information
- Date of birth: 16 March 1996 (age 30)
- Place of birth: Kingston, Jamaica
- Height: 1.81 m (5 ft 11 in)
- Position: Winger

Team information
- Current team: Cavalier
- Number: 9

Senior career*
Years	Team	Apps	(Gls)
2014–2020	Cavalier	113	(21)
2020–2021	York United	15	(0)
2020–2021	→ Dundee (loan)	0	(0)
2022–2023	Harbour View	24	(7)
2023	FF Jaro	9	(0)
2023	Jakobstads BK	2	(0)
2023–2024	Cavalier	1	(0)
2024–2025	Waterhouse	29	(3)
2025–2026	Cavalier		
2026	Jawalakhel		
2026–	Cavalier		

International career^{‡}
2022–	Jamaica	1	(0)
- * Club domestic league appearances and goals as of 30 August 2026 ‡ National team caps and goals as of 2 September 2022

Nicholas Hamilton (born 16 March 1996) is a Jamaican professional footballer who plays as a winger for Jamaica Premier League club Cavalier. He has previously played for Jamaican clubs Cavalier (four spells), Harbour View and Waterhouse, as well as with Canadian club York United, Scottish club Dundee, Finnish clubs FF Jaro and Jakobstads BK, and Nepalese club Jawalakhel YC. He has also played for the Jamaica national football team.

== Club career ==
=== Cavalier ===
Hamilton began his career with Cavalier SC in the National Premier League in 2014, and played over 100 league games with the side over 6 years, scoring 21 goals, including 10 goals in the 2018–19 season and 5 goals during the 2019–20 before the season's cancellation. In 2016–17 in the KSAFA Super League, Hamilton scored three goals en route to an immediate re-promotion to the National Premier League for Cavalier.

=== York United and Dundee loan ===
In February 2020, Hamilton signed a multi-year deal with Canadian Premier League side York United (known as York9 until December). Due to restrictions put in place due to the COVID-19 pandemic, Hamilton was unable to enter Canada to join the club for the 2020 season. In September 2020, Hamilton went on loan to Scottish Championship side Dundee. He first had to complete the required 14 day quarantine for travelers form outside of the country due to the pandemic, officially joining the club for training on 12 October, just days before their first league match. Hamilton made his debut for Dundee late on in a League Cup game against Cove Rangers, which Dundee would win 3–0. He scored his first goal in an exhibition match against Forfar Athletic on 9 December 2020. He was recalled from his loan on 1 June 2021. On July 10, Hamilton made his York United debut against Pacific FC, subbing on for Diyaeddine Abzi in the 80th minute of a 3–0 defeat. In December 2021, York announced they had declined Hamilton's contract option.

=== Harbour View ===
In 2022, Hamilton returned to Jamaica with National Premier League side Harbour View, making his debut on March 12 against Vere United. He would score two key goals for the club in both legs of the league play-off semi-finals against Waterhouse. Hamilton would score a penalty in a shootout victory which crowned Harbour View as National Premier League champions, their first league title since 2013. In January 2023, Hamilton was awarded the People's Choice Award at the RJR/Gleaner National Sportsperson Awards for his semi-final goal against Waterhouse.

=== Finland ===
In April 2023, after a two-week trial in Finland with IFK Mariehamn, Hamilton signed with Ykkönen club FF Jaro on a one-year deal. On 21 June, Hamilton would leave Jaro by mutual consent. Hamilton would then sign for fellow Jakobstad club Jakobstads BK, and would make his debut on 1 July 2023.

=== Cavalier return ===
In August 2023, Hamilton returned to Jamaica and his first team Cavalier. He made his second debut for the club on 31 August, in a CONCACAF Caribbean Cup win over A.C. Port of Spain. After struggling through the season with injury, Hamilton came on as a substitute for Cavalier in their Jamaica Premier League Finals victory over Mount Pleasant FA after scoring the winning penalty, winning his second national title in Jamaica.

=== Waterhouse ===
In September 2024, Hamilton joined fellow Jamaica Premier League club Waterhouse. Hamilton made his debut for the Firehouse on 29 September in a league game at home to his former club Cavalier. On 11 November, Hamilton scored his first goal for Waterhouse in an away league win against Molynes United. On 29 August 2025, Waterhouse announced that Hamilton had departed the club and thanked him for his efforts.

=== Jawalakhel ===
In January 2026, Hamilton joined Nepalese club Jawalakhel YC, becoming only the second Jamaican to play football in Nepal after Amal Knight, with the hope of experiencing a career rebirth in South Asia.

== International career ==
On the international level, Hamilton received a call-up for the Jamaica national football team in 2019.

In August 2022, Hamilton would be named as part of the Reggae Boyz squad to take part in a friendly tournament at the Ernst-Happel-Stadion in Vienna, Austria. Hamilton made his international debut in a friendly against Qatar on 26 August.

== Personal life ==
He attended Holy Trinity school in Jamaica. He is also referred to by the name "Kumi".

== Career statistics ==
As of match played 4 May 2025

Club	Season	League			National Cup		League Cup		Other		Total	
Club	Season	Division	Apps	Goals	Apps	Goals	Apps	Goals	Apps	Goals	Apps	Goals
Cavalier	2014–15	National Premier League	11	0	—		—		—		11	0
Cavalier	2015–16	National Premier League	15	3	—		—		—		15	3
Cavalier	2016–17	KSAFA Super League	?	3	—		—		—		?	3
Cavalier	2017–18	National Premier League	30	4	—		—		—		30	4
Cavalier	2018–19	National Premier League	36	9	—		—		—		36	9
Cavalier	2019–20	National Premier League	21	5	—		—		—		21	5
Cavalier	Total		113	24	0	0	0	0	0	0	113	24
York United	2020	Canadian Premier League	0	0	—		—		—		0	0
York United	2021	Canadian Premier League	15	0	1	0	—		—		16	0
York United	Total		15	0	1	0	0	0	0	0	16	0
Dundee (loan)	2020–21	Scottish Championship	0	0	0	0	1	0	0	0	1	0
Harbour View	2022	Jamaica Premier League	8	1	—		—		3 (Note: Appearance(s) in the Jamaica Premier League playoffs)	2	11	3
Harbour View	2022–23	Jamaica Premier League	16	6	—		—		0	0	16	6
Harbour View	Total		24	7	0	0	0	0	3	2	27	9
FF Jaro	2023	Ykkönen	9	0	1	0	—		0	0	10	0
Jakobstads BK	2023	Kakkonen	2	0	0	0	0	0	0	0	2	0
Cavalier	2023–24	Jamaica Premier League	1	0	0	0	0	0	6 (Note: Four appearances in CONCACAF Caribbean Cup, two appearances in Jamaica Premier League playoffs)	0	7	0
Waterhouse	2024–25	Jamaica Premier League	29	3	0	0	0	0	0	0	29	3
Career total			192	34	2	0	1	0	9	2	204	36

=== International ===
As of match played 26 August 2022

Appearances and goals by national team and year
National team	Year	Apps	Goals
Jamaica	2022	1	0
Total		1	0

== Honours ==
=== Club ===
Cavalier

- KSAFA Super League: 2016–17
- CONCACAF Caribbean Cup runner-up: 2023
- Jamaica Premier League: 2023–24

Dundee

- Scottish Premiership play-offs: 2020–21

Harbour View

- Jamaica Premier League: 2022

=== Individual ===
- 2022 RJR/Gleaner National Sportsman of the Year - People's Choice Award
