= Atapharoy Bygrave =

Jamaican footballer (born 1993)

Personal information
- Date of birth: 12 November 1993 (age 32)
- Place of birth: Spanish Town, Jamaica
- Height: 1.75 m (5 ft 9 in)
- Position: Forward

Senior career*
Years	Team	Apps	(Gls)
–2015	Cavalier		
2015–2016	August Town		
2016–2018	Grenades		
2018–2019	Tryum		
2019–2022	Dunbeholden	41	(16)
2022–2022	Hồ Chí Minh City	16	(4)

International career
2022–	Jamaica	4	(0)
- * Club domestic league appearances and goals

Atapharoy Bygrave (born 12 November 1993) is a Jamaican footballer who plays as a forward.

== Club career ==
In 2016, Bygrave signed for Antiguan side Grenades. In 2019, he signed for Dunbeholden in Jamaica, helping them finish second place. He was top scorer of the 2022 National Premier League with 13 goals. In 2022, Bygrave signed for Vietnamese club TPHCM.

== International career ==
Bygrave made his national team debut in March 2022.

== Honors ==
=== Individual ===
- 2022 Jamaica Premier League Golden Boot
