= Greensleeves Rhythm Album 5: Punanny =

Greensleeves Rhythm Album #5: Punanny

Compilation album by Various artists
- Released: November 4, 2000
- Recorded: 2000
- Genre: Dancehall
- Label: Greensleeves
- Producer: King Jammy; Ward 21

Various artists chronology
Volume (2000)	Greensleeves Rhythm Album #5: Punanny (2000)	Latino/Boasy Gal (2000)

Professional ratings
Review scores
Source	Rating
Allmusic	link

Greensleeves Rhythm Album #5: Punanny is an album in Greensleeves Records' rhythm album series. It was released in November 2000 on CD and LP. The album features the famous King Jammy's "Punanny" riddim from the 1986 Admiral Bailey hit "Punanny". The first tracks on the album feature currents artists over a re-lick version of the riddim by Ward 21, while the last 10 tracks feature artists over the original riddim.

== Track listing ==
1. "Punanny Medley" - Various artists
2. "Pum Pum" - Elephant Man
3. "Roll Deep" - Beenie Man
4. "Chuckie Boo" - Mr. Vegas
5. "Haters Pt. 2" - Ward 21
6. "Shot Cocky" - Danny English
7. "Bruk Weh" - Buccaneer
8. "Man & Woman Fi Dance" - Anthony B
9. "It's All About Cash" - Lady Saw
10. "Get U Coffin" - Harry Toddler
11. "Gimme A Light" - Wayne Marshall
12. "Five A Day" - Ward 21
13. "Punanny" - Admiral Bailey
14. "Healthy Body" - Admiral Bailey
15. "Halla Fi Body" - Shabba Ranks
16. "Needle Eye Pum Pum" - Shabba Ranks
17. "Babylon Boops" - Major Worries
18. "Yes Mama" - Little John
19. "Bike Rack" - Johnny P
20. "Bucket A Shit" - Little Twitch
21. "Border Clash" - Ninjaman
22. "Carbon Copy" - Tiger
