= Nicholas Hamilton (disambiguation) =

Nicholas Hamilton may refer to:

- Nicholas Hamilton, Australian actor and musician
- Nicholas Hamilton (footballer), Jamaican football player

== See also ==
- Nick Barton (Nicholas Hamilton Barton), British evolutionary biologist
- Nicolas Hamilton, English racing driver
- Nick Patrick (referee) (real name Nick Hamilton), professional wrestling referee
