= Timar Lewis =

Jamaican footballer (born 1998)

Personal information
- Full name: Timar Lewis
- Date of birth: 11 April 1998 (age 28)
- Place of birth: Westmoreland, Jamaica
- Height: 1.78 m (5 ft 10 in)
- Position: Winger

Team information
- Current team: Harbour View
- Number: 11

Youth career
- 2010–2017: Munro College

Senior career*
Years	Team	Apps	(Gls)
2017–2018	Sandals South Coast F.C.	18	(3)
2018–	Harbour View	21	(1)
- * Club domestic league appearances and goals as of 10:53, 19 February 2019 (UTC)

Timar Lewis (born 11 April 1998) is a Jamaican footballer who plays for Harbour View as a winger.

== Career ==
Lewis is a left-footed midfielder who has played both in the defence at left back and on the left side of midfield. He made his professional debut for Sandals South Coast F.C. during the 2017–18 National Premier League season. On 15 October 2017 he scored his first goal as a professional with Sandals in a 1–1 draw with Cavalier SC.

During August 2018 Lewis joined Harbour View. He scored his first goal with the club on 17 December 2018 in a 3–0 victory over Montego Bay United.

During February 2019 he went on trial with New York Red Bulls II.

== Career statistics ==
As of 19 February 2019

Club	Season	League		League Cup		Domestic Cup		CONCACAF		Total	
Club	Season	Apps	Goals	Apps	Goals	Apps	Goals	Apps	Goals	Apps	Goals
Sandals South Coast F.C.	2017-18	18	3	-	-	-	-	-	-	18	3
Harbour View	2018-19	21	1	-	-	-	-	-	-	21	1
Career total		39	4	-	-	-	-	-	-	39	3
