= Jason Wright (Jamaican footballer) =

Jamaican football player (born 1994)

Jason Nathaniel Wright
Personal information
- Full name: Jason Nathaniel Wright
- Date of birth: December 26, 1994 (age 31)
- Place of birth: Jamaica
- Height: 1.75 m (5 ft 9 in)
- Position: Forward

Team information
- Current team: Molynes United
- Number: 10

College career
Years	Team	Apps	(Gls)
2014-2016	Rutgers University	59	(29)
2017-2018	Clemson University	19	(8)

Senior career*
Years	Team	Apps	(Gls)
2018–2019	Cavalier	3	(0)
2019–2021	Humble Lions	10	(0)
2022	CS Mioveni	1	(0)
2022–	Molynes United	48	(26)

International career^{‡}
2011	Jamaica U17	8	(4)
2013	Jamaica U20	2	(0)
2016	Jamaica U23	1	(0)
2024–	Jamaica	2	(0)
- * Club domestic league appearances and goals as of 9 December 2023 ‡ National team caps and goals as of 9 December 2023

Jason Wright (born 26 December 1994) is a Jamaican footballer who plays as a forward and captains Molynes United.

== College career ==
Wright played for Rutgers University where he made 59 appearances scoring 29 goals and a total of 13 assists. Wright received several awards during his tenure at Rutgers including a NSCCAA All-American selection. He transferred to Clemson University to complete his senior year. While at Clemson University he made 19 appearances scoring 8 goals and adding 3 assists.

== Professional career ==
Wright began his career at Cavalier and moved to Humble Lions after one season. After impressing at Humble Lions, Wright signed with Romanian superliga club CS Mioveni in February 2022 becoming the first Jamaican in history to play in Romania superliga. Wright returned to Jamaica and signed with Molynes United in September 2022.

Wright netted a hat-trick for Molynes United in an entertaining 4–3 win over Tivoli Gardens in the 2022-23 Jamaica Premier League season.

== International career ==
Wright netted a brace for the Jamaica Under-17 team in a 2–1 win over Honduras in the 2011 CONCACAF Under-17 quarter-finals to secure Jamaica's passage to the 2011 FIFA Under-17 World Cup in Mexico. Wright was the joint leading goal scorer at the 2011 Under-17 Concacaf championship. Wright went on to represent the Jamaica Under-20 and Jamaica Under-23 level. Wright has made two appearances for Jamaica's national team against their heart rival Trinidad and Tobago in February and March 2024.
