= Renaldo Wellington =

Jamaican footballer (born 1999)

Personal information
- Date of birth: 3 March 1999 (age 27)
- Position: Defender

Team information
- Current team: Harbour View F.C.

Senior career*
Years	Team	Apps	(Gls)
2018–2021	Montego Bay United		
2021–	Harbour View F.C.		

International career^{‡}
2021–	Jamaica	1	(0)
- * Club domestic league appearances and goals as of 14 April 2021 ‡ National team caps and goals as of 14 April 2021

Renaldo Wellington (born 3 March 1999) is a Jamaican football defender who plays for Harbour View F.C.

== Career ==
=== Club ===
Has played locally for Montego Bay United F.C.

In 2021, Wellington transferred to Harbour View F.C.

=== International ===
Wellington was capped by Jamaica for the March 2021 USA friendly in Austria.
