= Chamell Asprilla =

Panamanian footballer (born 1998)

Personal information
- Full name: Chamell Gernell Asprilla Alarcón
- Date of birth: 11 August 1998 (age 28)
- Place of birth: Ciudad de Colón, Panama
- Height: 1.75 m (5 ft 9 in)
- Position: Midfielder

Team information
- Current team: Atlético Chiriquí

Senior career*
Years	Team	Apps	(Gls)
2016–2018	Árabe Unido	28	(5)
2018–2019	Leones de América		
2019–2020	CD Almeda	16	(1)
2020–2021	Árabe Unido	20	(3)
2021	Veraguas	14	(1)
2022–	Atlético Chiriquí	35	(3)

International career^{‡}
- Panama U17
2017–	Panama U20	2	(0)
2017	Panama	1	(0)
- * Club domestic league appearances and goals as of 1 January 2024 ‡ National team caps and goals as of 30 May 2024

Chamell Gernell Asprilla Alarcón (born 11 August 1998) is a Panamanian footballer currently playing for Panamanian club Atlético Chiriquí in the Liga Panameña de Fútbol.

== International career ==
At the youth level he played in the 2015 CONCACAF U-17 Championship qualifiers and the 2017 CONCACAF U-20 Championship.

Asprilla made his senior international debut for Panama on October 24, 2017, during a friendly match against Grenada.

== Career statistics ==
=== International ===
As of matches played 2 January 2018.

National team	Year	Apps	Goals
Panama	2017	1	0
Total		1	0
