= Oquassa Chong =

Jamaican footballer (born 2000)

Personal information
- Date of birth: 6 March 2000 (age 26)
- Position: Forward

Team information
- Current team: Mount Pleasant FA

Senior career*
Years	Team	Apps	(Gls)
2018–2022	Harbour View	19	(6)
2022–2023	Esbjerg fB	0	(0)
2023–	Mount Pleasant FA	11	(4)
- * Club domestic league appearances and goals as of 19:48, 7 March 2024 (UTC)

Oquassa Chong (born 6 March 2000) is a Jamaican professional footballer who plays for Mount Pleasant Football Academy as a forward.

== Early life ==
Chong attended Jamaica College.

== Club career ==
After playing for Harbour View in the National Premier League, Chong signed for Danish club Esbjerg fB in January 2022, signing a three-and-a-half-year contract.

He returned to Jamaica in April 2023 for a break from Denmark, before returning permanently later in the year to sign for Mount Pleasant Football Academy.

== International career ==
Chong was called up to the Jamaica national team for the first team in January 2022.

== Honors ==
Individual

- 2021 Jamaica Premier League Golden Boot
