= Thorn Simpson =

Jamaican football player (born 1998)

Personal information
- Full name: Thorn Simpson
- Date of birth: 22 February 1998 (age 28)
- Place of birth: Kingston, Jamaica
- Height: 6 ft 3 in (1.91 m)
- Position: Striker

Team information
- Current team: Molynes United
- Number: 9

Senior career*
Years	Team	Apps	(Gls)
2017–2018	Harbour View	9	(0)
2018	Reno	12	(3)
2019–2020	UWI	26	(10)
2020–2022	Molynes United		
2021	→ North Carolina FC (loan)	20	(1)
2022–	Molynes United	9	(0)
- * Club domestic league appearances and goals as of 19:19, 25 December 2023 (UTC)

Thorn Simpson (born 22 February 1998) is a Jamaican professional footballer who plays as a striker for Molynes United.

== Club career ==
Simpson began his career in Jamaica, playing for Harbour View, Reno, UWI, and Molynes United.

On 14 May 2021, Simpson was loaned to USL League One side North Carolina FC. His debut for North Carolina FC came on 22 May in a goalless draw vs. Richmond Kickers. His first goal came on 18 July vs. Toronto FC II.
