= Damion Hyatt =

Jamaican footballer (born 1985)

Personal information
- Date of birth: 23 December 1985 (age 40)
- Place of birth: Kingston, Jamaica
- Height: 1.89 m (6 ft 2 in)
- Position: Goalkeeper

Senior career*
Years	Team	Apps	(Gls)
2007–2008	August Town		
2008–2020	Arnett Gardens		
2021–2024	Dunbeholden		

International career
2018	Jamaica	2	(0)
Medal record
Men's football
Representing Jamaica
CONCACAF Gold Cup
Runner-up	2017 United States	Team
- * Club domestic league appearances and goals

Damion Hyatt (born 23 December 1985) is a Jamaican international footballer who plays as a goalkeeper.

== Career ==
Hyatt has played club football for August Town, Arnett Gardens and Dunbeholden.

He made his international debut for Jamaica in 2018.
