= Zerguinho Deira =

Surinamese footballer (born 2002)

Personal information
- Full name: Zerguinho Maikel Deira
- Date of birth: 23 July 2002 (age 24)
- Place of birth: Paramaribo, Suriname
- Height: 1.83 m (6 ft 0 in)
- Positions: Defensive midfielder; defender

Team information
- Current team: Montego Bay United

Youth career
- 2006–2018: Transvaal

Senior career*
| Years | Team | Apps | (Gls) |
| 2018–2025 | Transvaal | | |
| 2025 | Cavalier | | |
| 2026 | Leo Victor | | |
| 2026– | Montego Bay United | | |

International career
| 2019 | Suriname U17 | 3 | (0) |
| 2018 | Suriname U20 | 3 | (0) |
| 2018–2019 | Suriname | 3 | (0) |
- * Club domestic league appearances and goals

Zerguinho Maikel Deira (born 23 July 2002) is a Surinamese professional footballer who plays as a defensive midfielder and defender for Jamaica Premier League club Montego Bay United.

== Club career ==
Deira joined Transvaal at the age of four. He made his debut for the first team at the age of sixteen.

== International career ==
On 13 October 2018, Deira made his debut for Suriname in a 5–0 win against the British Virgin Islands. In doing so, he became the youngest player in the history of the Suriname national team, at the age of sixteen.
