= 2015 CONCACAF U-17 Championship qualifying =

The qualifying competitions for the 2015 CONCACAF U-17 Championship were handled by two regional of CONCACAF's bodies; the Caribbean Football Union (Caribbean zone) and the Central American Football Union (Central American zone).

Representative teams from Canada, Mexico and the United States automatically qualified for the final competition.

== Caribbean Zone ==
2014 CFU Men's U-17 Tournament
2015 CONCACAF U-17 Championship qualifying (Caribbean zone)

Tournament details
- Host countries: Jamaica; Saint Lucia; Dominican Republic; Bahamas; Cuba (first round groups); Haiti (finals)
- Dates: 18 July – 27 August 2014 (first round); 19–26 October 2014 (finals)
- Teams: 20 (total); 8 (finals) (from 1 sub-confederation)

Final positions
- Champions: Haiti
- Runners-up: Jamaica
- Third place: Cuba
- Fourth place: Saint Lucia

Tournament statistics
- Matches played: 41
- Goals scored: 142 (3.46 per match)
- Top scorer(s): (Jamaica) Nicholas Nelson (total; 10 goals finals; 6 goals)
- Best player: (Jamaica) Alex Marshall
- Best goalkeeper: (Haiti) Emmanuel Chery
- Fair play award: Guadeloupe

The Caribbean qualification competition (2014 CFU Men's U-17 Tournament) was organised by the Caribbean Football Union (CFU).

All match times are UTC−4, except Group 1 which are UTC−5.

=== Teams ===
A total of 20 teams entered the competition.

Round	Teams entering round	No. of teams
Did not enter	Anguilla; Aruba; Bonaire; British Virgin Islands; French Guiana; Montserrat; Saint Kitts and Nevis; Saint Martin; Saint Vincent and the Grenadines; Sint Maarten; Turks and Caicos Islands	11
First round	Antigua and Barbuda; Bahamas; Barbados; Bermuda; Cayman Islands; Cuba; Curaçao; Dominica; Dominican Republic; Grenada; Guadeloupe; Guyana; Jamaica; Martinique; Puerto Rico; Saint Lucia; Suriname; Trinidad and Tobago; U.S. Virgin Islands	19
Second round	Haiti	1

=== First round ===
The group winners and the two best runners-up advanced to the final round.

==== Group 1 ====
Pos	Team	Pld	W	D	L	GF	GA	GD	Pts	Qualification
1	Jamaica (H)	3	3	0	0	27	3	+24	9	Qualify to Final round
2	Guadeloupe	3	2	0	1	8	3	+5	6	Qualify to Final round
3	Cayman Islands	3	1	0	2	5	8	−3	3	
4	U.S. Virgin Islands	3	0	0	3	0	26	−26	0	

Source: CFU
(H) Hosts
23 August 2014
16:00

Guadeloupe	3–0	Cayman Islands
Julius 54'; Fumont 79' (pen.); Bordin 80'	Report

Anthony Spalding Sports Complex, Kingston
Referee: Moeth Gaymes (St Vincent & Grenadines)
23 August 2014
19:00

Jamaica	19–0	U.S. Virgin Islands
Dawkins 5', 32', 43', 67', 70', 86', 89'; McMaster 9', 36', 50', 60'; Marshall 15', 20', 23'; Brown 29'; Nelson 68', 79'; Talbot 74', 90'	Report

Anthony Spalding Sports Complex, Kingston
Referee: Kimbell Ward (St Kitts & Nevis)

25 August 2014
16:00

U.S. Virgin Islands	0–5	Guadeloupe
	Report	Zelateur 26', 31', 78'; Adelaide 72'; Luissint 90+2'

Anthony Spalding Sports Complex, Kingston
Referee: Neal Brizan (Trinidad & Tobago)
25 August 2014
19:00

Jamaica	5–3	Cayman Islands
Marshall 15', 62' (pen.), 90'; Brown 18'; Talbot 74'	Report	Ebanks 5'; Seymour 7'; Scott 25'

Anthony Spalding Sports Complex, Kingston
Referee: Moeth Gaymes (St Vincent & Grenadines)

27 August 2014
16:00

Cayman Islands	2–0	U.S. Virgin Islands
Jackson 45'; Thomas 55'	Report

Anthony Spalding Sports Complex, Kingston
Referee: Kimbell Ward (St Kitts & Nevis)
27 August 2014
19:00

Jamaica	3–0	Guadeloupe
Nelson 23', 33'; Dawkins 55'	Report

Anthony Spalding Sports Complex, Kingston
Referee: Neal Brizan (Trinidad & Tobago)

==== Group 2 ====
Pos	Team	Pld	W	D	L	GF	GA	GD	Pts	Qualification
1	Trinidad and Tobago	3	3	0	0	7	2	+5	9	Qualify to Final round
2	Saint Lucia (H)	3	2	0	1	10	5	+5	6	Qualify to Final round
3	Grenada	3	1	0	2	4	7	−3	3	
4	Curaçao	3	0	0	3	3	10	−7	0	

Source: CFU
(H) Hosts
20 August 2014
18:00

Trinidad and Tobago	2–0	Grenada
Hoyce 4'; Daniel 65'	Report

Beausejour Cricket Ground, Gros Islet
Referee: Trevor Taylor (Barbados)
20 August 2014
20:00

Saint Lucia	4–2	Curaçao
Nicholas 15', 45'; Winter 19'; Prospere 33'	Report	Lodovica 90+3'; Fransinet 90+5'

Beausejour Cricket Ground, Gros Islet
Referee: Johannes Dolaini (Surinam)

22 August 2014
18:00

Curaçao	0–2	Trinidad and Tobago
	Report	Mason 47'; Celestine 84'

Beausejour Cricket Ground, Gros Islet
Referee: Bryan Willett (Antigua & Barbuda)
22 August 2014
20:00

Saint Lucia	4–0	Grenada
Winter 15', 50'; Joseph 67'; Albertine 87'	Report

Beausejour Cricket Ground, Gros Islet
Referee: Sherwin Moore (Guyana)

24 August 2014
18:00

Grenada	4–1	Curaçao

Beausejour Cricket Ground, Gros Islet
Referee: Johannes Dolaini (Surinam)
24 August 2014
20:00

Saint Lucia	2–3	Trinidad and Tobago

Beausejour Cricket Ground, Gros Islet
Referee: Trevor Taylor (Barbados)

==== Group 3 ====
Pos	Team	Pld	W	D	L	GF	GA	GD	Pts	Qualification
1	Barbados	3	2	1	0	5	1	+4	7	Qualify to Final round
2	Dominican Republic (H)	3	1	1	1	3	2	+1	4	
3	Guyana	3	1	1	1	4	6	−2	4	
4	Antigua and Barbuda	3	0	1	2	2	5	−3	1	

Source: CFU
(H) Hosts
18 July 2014
14:00

Guyana	1–1	Barbados
Washington 61'	Report	Greaves 49'

Estadio Panamericano, San Cristóbal
Referee: Neal Brizan (Trinidad & Tobago)
18 July 2014
16:30

Dominican Republic	0–0	Antigua and Barbuda
	Report

Estadio Panamericano, San Cristóbal
Referee: Javier Santos (Puerto-Rico)

20 July 2014
14:00

Antigua and Barbuda	2–3	Guyana
Stevens 30'; Henry 79'	Report	Dick 6', 37'; Washington 90+2'

Estadio Panamericano, San Cristóbal
Referee: Walner Laventure (Haiti)
20 July 2014
16:30

Dominican Republic	0–2	Barbados
	Report	Esworth 80'; Forde 90+4'

Estadio Panamericano, San Cristóbal
Referee: Wilson Da Costa (Bahamas)

22 July 2014
14:00

Barbados	2–0	Antigua and Barbuda
Went 34', 57'	Report

Estadio Panamericano, San Cristóbal
Referee: Javier Santos (Puerto-Rico)
22 July 2014
16:30

Dominican Republic	3–0	Guyana
Marte 45+2', 52', 66'	Report

Estadio Panamericano, San Cristóbal
Referee: Neal Brizan (Trinidad & Tobago)

==== Group 4 ====
Pos	Team	Pld	W	D	L	GF	GA	GD	Pts	Qualification
1	Martinique	3	2	1	0	5	1	+4	7	Qualify to Final round
2	Bermuda	3	1	2	0	5	1	+4	5	
3	Puerto Rico	3	1	1	1	4	2	+2	4	
4	Bahamas (H)	3	0	0	3	0	10	−10	0	

Source: CFU
(H) Hosts
23 July 2014
17:00

Puerto Rico	0–2	Martinique
	Report	Sainte-Marie 79'; Agot 90'

Roscow A. L. Davies Soccer Field, Nassau
Referee: Valdin Legister (Jamaica)
23 July 2014
19:30

Bahamas	0–4	Bermuda
	Report	Bailey 42', 51'; Bascome 76' (pen.); Butterfield 90+3'

Roscow A. L. Davies Soccer Field, Nassau
Referee: Alain Georges (Haiti)

25 July 2014
17:00

Bermuda	0–0	Puerto Rico
	Report

Roscow A. L. Davies Soccer Field, Nassau
Referee: Dwight Royal (Jamaica)
25 July 2014
19:30

Bahamas	0–2	Martinique
	Report	Matteo 49'; Andrew 58'

Roscow A. L. Davies Soccer Field, Nassau
Referee: Alain Georges (Haiti)

27 July 2014
15:00

Martinique	1–1	Bermuda
Corteau 20'	Report	Lowe 8'

Roscow A. L. Davies Soccer Field, Nassau
Referee: Alain Georges (Haiti)
27 July 2014
17:30

Bahamas	0–4	Puerto Rico
	Report	Arocha 17', 90+3'; Rivera 76'; Martinez 88'

Roscow A. L. Davies Soccer Field, Nassau
Referee: Valdin Legister (Jamaica)

==== Group 5 ====
Pos	Team	Pld	W	D	L	GF	GA	GD	Pts	Qualification
1	Cuba (H)	2	2	0	0	6	0	+6	6	Qualify to Final round
2	Suriname	2	1	0	1	3	2	+1	3	
3	Dominica	2	0	0	2	0	7	−7	0	

Source: CFU
(H) Hosts
25 July 2014
17:00

Dominica	0–4	Cuba
	Report	Blanco 14'; Borromeo 37', 90+3'; Gonzalez 70'

Estadio Pedro Marrero, Havana

27 July 2014
17:00

Dominica	0–3	Suriname
	Report	MacDonald 17' (pen.); Schmeltz 46' (pen.); Tolud 90+' (pen.)

Estadio Pedro Marrero, Havana

29 July 2014
16:00

Cuba	2–0	Suriname
Borromeo 15' (pen.); Campillo 45+1'	Report

Estadio Pedro Marrero, Havana

==== Ranking of runners-up ====
Since Group 5 contains three teams, only the results against the first and third placed teams are counted. The Dominican Republic were given the tie-breaker over Suriname and would play in the final round of qualifying.

Pos	Team	Pld	W	D	L	GF	GA	GD	Pts	Qualification
1	Saint Lucia	2	1	0	1	6	3	+3	3	Qualify to Final round
2	Dominican Republic	2	1	0	1	3	2	+1	3	
3	Suriname	2	1	0	1	3	2	+1	3	
4	Guadeloupe	2	1	0	1	3	3	0	3	Qualify to Final round
5	Bermuda	2	0	2	0	1	1	0	2	

Source: CFU

=== Final round ===
The final round was hosted in Haiti.

The CFU released a new fixtures list. Guadeloupe were given the spot assumed to be given to Suriname or The Dominican Republic. The dates of the matches were changed from late September to October 19–26. The top two from each group and the best third placed team advanced to the 2015 CONCACAF U-17 Championship.

==== Group A ====
Pos	Team	Pld	W	D	L	GF	GA	GD	Pts	Qualification
1	Haiti (H)	3	3	0	0	11	1	+10	9	Qualify to CONCACAF U-17 Championship & Final
2	Saint Lucia	3	1	1	1	4	7	−3	4	Qualify to CONCACAF U-17 Championship & Third place playoff
3	Trinidad and Tobago	3	1	0	2	3	5	−2	3	Qualify to CONCACAF U-17 Championship
4	Barbados	3	0	1	2	1	6	−5	1	

Source: CFU
(H) Hosts
19 October 2014
17:00

Saint Lucia	2–0	Trinidad and Tobago
Nicholas 25', 53'	Report

Stade Sylvio Cator, Port-au-Prince
Referee: Dwight Royal (Jamaica)
19 October 2014
19:30

Haiti	2–0	Barbados
Pierre 5'; Ulysse 34'	Report

Stade Sylvio Cator, Port-au-Prince
Referee: Yadel Martinez Pupo (Cuba)

21 October 2014
17:00

Trinidad and Tobago	3–0	Barbados
Herbert 19'; Hoyce 50'; Daniel 77'	Report

Stade Sylvio Cator, Port-au-Prince
Referee: Marco Brea Despaigne (Cuba)
21 October 2014
19:30

Haiti	6–1	Saint Lucia
Jeudy 17'; Damus 31'; Bissainthe 45'; Maitre 49', 64', 83'	Report	Nicholas 61'

Stade Sylvio Cator, Port-au-Prince
Referee: Wilson Da Costa (Bahamas)

23 October 2014
17:00

Barbados	1–1	Saint Lucia
Leacock 55'	Report	Wilfred 72'

Stade Sylvio Cator, Port-au-Prince
Referee: Wilson Da Costa (Bahamas)
23 October 2014
19:30

Haiti	3–0	Trinidad and Tobago
Metellus 14'; Claude 56', 69'	Report

Stade Sylvio Cator, Port-au-Prince
Referee: Yadel Martinez Pupo (Cuba)

==== Group B ====
Pos	Team	Pld	W	D	L	GF	GA	GD	Pts	Qualification
1	Jamaica	3	3	0	0	10	2	+8	9	Qualify to CONCACAF U-17 Championship & Final
2	Cuba	3	2	0	1	6	3	+3	6	Qualify to CONCACAF U-17 Championship & Third place playoff
3	Guadeloupe	3	1	0	2	2	8	−6	3	
4	Martinique	3	0	0	3	0	5	−5	0	

Source: CFU
20 October 2014
17:00

Cuba	5–0	Guadeloupe
Sanchez 23'; Campillo 41'; Herrera 45'; Borromeo 47'; Romero 69'	Report

Stade Sylvio Cator, Port-au-Prince
Referee: Leo Clarke (St Lucia)
20 October 2014
19:30

Jamaica	4–0	Martinique
Marshall 16'; Grant 75'; Nelson 84'; Beckford 90'	Report

Stade Sylvio Cator, Port-au-Prince
Referee: Sherwin Johnson (Guyana)

22 October 2014
17:00

Martinique	0–1	Cuba
		Gonzalez 60'

Stade Sylvio Cator, Port-au-Prince
Referee: Kimbell Ward (St Kitts & Nevis)
22 October 2014
19:30

Jamaica	3–2	Guadeloupe
Nelson 3', 26', 80'

Stade Sylvio Cator, Port-au-Prince
Referee: Adrian Skeete (Barbados)

24 October 2014
17:00

Guadeloupe	1–0	Martinique
Zelateur 17'	Report

Stade Sylvio Cator, Port-au-Prince
Referee: Kimbell Ward (St Kitts & Nevis)
24 October 2014
19:30

Cuba	0–3	Jamaica
	Report	Vassell 24'; Nelson 81' (pen.), 83'

Stade Sylvio Cator, Port-au-Prince
Referee: Leo Clarke (St Lucia)

==== Third place playoff ====
26 October 2014
17:00

Saint Lucia	0–2	Cuba
	Report	Cerbranco 16'; Herrera 37'

Stade Sylvio Cator, Port-au-Prince
Referee: Kimbell Ward (St Kitts & Nevis)

==== Final ====
26 October 2014
19:30

Haiti	2–0	Jamaica
Metellus 20', 75'	Report

Stade Sylvio Cator, Port-au-Prince
Referee: Yadel Martinez Pupo (Cuba)

==== Awards ====
Golden Boot

- (Jamaica) Nicholas Nelson

MVP

- (Jamaica) Alex Marshall

Golden Glove

- (Haiti) Emmanuel Chery

Fair Play Award

- Guadeloupe

== Central American Zone ==
2015 CONCACAF U-17 Championship qualifying (Central American zone)
Tournament details
- Host countries: Costa Rica; Panama
- Dates: 4–30 July 2014 (first round); 17–24 January 2015 (play-off)
- Teams: 6 (from 1 sub-confederation)

Tournament statistics
- Matches played: 8
- Goals scored: 29 (3.63 per match)
- Top scorer(s): (Panama) Ronaldo Córdoba (El Salvador) Carlos Herrera (3 goals each)

The Central American qualification competition was organised by the Central American Football Union (UNCAF). Honduras, host of the 2015 CONCACAF U-17 Championship, did not participate in the qualifying tournament. The remaining six UNCAF teams were drawn on 19 May 2014 into two triangulars, which were hosted in Costa Rica and Panama, respectively. The first-place teams from each triangular qualified for the 2015 CONCACAF U-17 Championship, while the second-place teams contested a repechage playoff for the final UNCAF berth.

All match times are UTC−6, except Triangular 2 which are UTC−5.

=== Triangular 1 ===
Pos	Team	Pld	W	D	L	GF	GA	GD	Pts	Qualification
1	Costa Rica (H)	2	2	0	0	5	2	+3	6	Qualify to CONCACAF U-17 Championship
2	El Salvador	2	1	0	1	8	2	+6	3	Repechage playoff
3	Belize	2	0	0	2	1	10	−9	0	

Source: UNCAF
(H) Hosts
4 July 2014
15:00

Costa Rica	3–1	Belize
Martínez 64' (pen.), 72' (pen.); Reyes 88'	Report	Sifontes 2'

Estadio Edgardo Baltodano Briceño, Liberia
Referee: Mario Escobar (Guatemala)

6 July 2014
15:00

Belize	0–7	El Salvador
	Report	Montes 8'; Blanco 41'; Bonilla 43'; Herrera 66', 86'; Espinal 71'; Meléndez 76' (pen.)

Estadio Edgardo Baltodano Briceño, Liberia
Referee: Ariel Sánchez (Panama)

8 July 2014
15:00

Costa Rica	2–1	El Salvador
Palomo 18' (o.g.); Hernández 67'	Report	Herrera 42'

Estadio Edgardo Baltodano Briceño, Liberia
Referee: Oscar Moncada (Honduras)

=== Triangular 2 ===
Pos	Team	Pld	W	D	L	GF	GA	GD	Pts	Qualification
1	Panama (H)	2	2	0	0	9	1	+8	6	Qualify to CONCACAF U-17 Championship
2	Guatemala	2	1	0	1	3	4	−1	3	Repechage playoff
3	Nicaragua	2	0	0	2	0	7	−7	0	

Source: UNCAF
(H) Hosts
26 July 2014
20:00

Panama	5–0	Nicaragua
Santos 41'; Ávila 74'; Kirtoon 83'; Córdoba 89'; Carrasquilla 90+1'	Report

Estadio Maracaná, Panama City
Referee: Christopher Reid (Belize)

28 July 2014
20:00

Nicaragua	0–2	Guatemala
	Report	Méndez 38' (pen.); García 71'

Estadio Maracaná, Panama City
Referee: Melvin Matamoros (Honduras)

30 July 2014
18:00

Panama	4–1	Guatemala
Asprilla 2'; Córdoba 27', 74'; Rodríguez 83'	Report	Lemus 80'

Estadio Maracaná, Panama City
Referee: Ricardo Montero (Costa Rica)

=== Repechage playoff ===
The two triangular runners-up played a two-legged repechage playoff to determine the last qualifier. The draw for the order of legs was held on 25 November 2014.

Team 1	Agg.	Team 2	1st leg	2nd leg
Guatemala	2–1	El Salvador	0–1	2–0

17 January 2015
15:00

Guatemala	0–1	El Salvador
	Report	Menendez 8'

Estadio Julio Armando Cobar, San Miguel Petapa
Attendance: 1,500
Referee: Jafeth Perea (Panama)

24 January 2015
15:00

El Salvador	0–2	Guatemala
	Report	Raymundo 21'; García 51'

Estadio Cuscatlán, San Salvador
Attendance: 9,374
Referee: Oscar Moncada (Honduras)

Guatemala won 2–1 on aggregate and qualified for the 2015 CONCACAF U-17 Championship.

== Qualified teams ==
North American zone

- Canada (automatic)
- Mexico (automatic)
- United States (automatic)

Central American zone

- Honduras (hosts)
- Costa Rica
- Panama
- Guatemala

Caribbean zone

- Haiti
- Jamaica
- Cuba
- Saint Lucia
- Trinidad and Tobago
