= Lynk Cup =

Football tournament in Jamaica

- Organiser(s): Jamaica Football Federation
- Founded: 2022
- Region: Jamaica
- Teams: 24
- Current champions: Portmore United (1st title)
- Most championships: Portmore United (1 title)
- 2023 Lynk Cup

The Lynk Cup is an annual knockout competition held for football clubs of Jamaica. Established to promote and celebrate the diversity and depth of soccer talent in the country. The competition holds all the soccer teams in the Jamaican Premier League, along with 10 selected teams from the Jamaican Football Federation's Tier 2.

== Overview ==
The Lynk Cup, first introduced in 2022, is organized by the Jamaica Football Federation (JFF) in collaboration with Lynk Jamaica. It replaces the JFF Champions Cup last held in 2014. The tournament is sponsored by Lynk, a prominent mobile payment company, supporting sports and community development in Jamaica. This competition serves as a platform for emerging talent to shine while allowing the established Premier League teams to fine-tune their skills in a competitive environment.

=== Participating teams ===
The Lynk Cup brings together a total of 24 teams, all 14 teams from the National Premier League and an additional 10 teams from the JFF Tier 2. The inclusion of Tier 2 teams was designed to provide an opportunity for these clubs to showcase their abilities against stronger and more experienced opposition.

=== Format ===
The Lynk Cup follows a knockout format, where teams are eliminated from the competition upon losing their match. The matches are typically played over 2 legs with the winner on aggregate, advancing to the next round. In the final, a single leg is played and the champion is crowned. The knockout stage consists of multiple rounds including, the Round of 24, Round of 16, Quarter-finals, Semi-finals, and the Finals.

=== Finals ===
The final is held at Sabina Park, this match has the potential to draw thousands of fans as the stadium holds 20,000. The final is usually held as a double header with the match for 3rd place being played before the final. The victorious team is awarded the prestigious Lynk Cup along with a sum of money;

- Winner - J$1.65million
- Runners Up - J$1.45million
- Third place - J$1.05million

== History ==
When founded, the Lynk Cup ended the 9-year hiatus of an all-island knock out competition in Jamaican football, which was previously served by the JFF Champions Cup, last held in 2014.

Portmore United defeated Cavalier 2–0 in the inaugural Lynk Cup National final to claim the first ever title and their only silverware of the 2022-23 season.

== Controversy ==
The inaugural JFF Lynk Cup final between Portmore United and Cavalier at Sabina Park was overshadowed by robbery, as thieves broke into one of the dressing rooms. Several Cavalier players were robbed of their belongings while the game was in progress. Phones, money and other valuables were discovered to have been stolen when the Cavalier team returned to the dressing room at half time.

== Winners and finalists ==
Club	Wins	Champions	Runners-up
Portmore United	1	2023	—
Cavalier F.C.		—	2023

Source: Soccerway
