= Jermy Nelson =

Jamaican footballer (born 1994)

Personal information
- Full name: Jermy Patrick Nelson
- Date of birth: May 10, 1994 (age 32)
- Place of birth: Jamaica
- Position: Midfielder

Team information
- Current team: Molynes United
- Number: 7

Senior career*
Years	Team	Apps	(Gls)
2014–2017	Rivoli United	?	(5)
2018–2019	Cavalier	31	(0)
2019–2020	Molynes United	19	(5)
2020–2021	Mount Pleasant	6	(0)
2021–	Molynes United	59	(7)
- * Club domestic league appearances and goals as of 6 January 2024

Jermy Nelson (born May 10, 1994) is a Jamaican footballer who plays as a midfielder for Molynes United.

== Career ==
Nelson began his professional career at Rivoli United in 2013 before moving to Cavalier in 2018.

Nelson moved to Molynes United, along with his younger brother Nicholas Nelson, in 2019 to help the club in their debut season in the Red Stripe Premier League.

In 2020 Nelson was sold to Mount Pleasant as part of a two-player transfer from Molynes United in order to stabilize the club's finances.

Nelson returned to Molynes United in 2021 after a single season with Mount Pleasant.

== Style of play ==
Nelson was regarded as a midfield general during his time at Rivoli United.

== Personal life ==
Nelson's younger brother, Nicholas Nelson is also a professional footballer.
