= Sandals South Coast F.C. =

Jamaican football club

Sandals South Coast
- Full name: Sandals South Coast Football Club
- Founded: January 1, 2007; 19 years ago as Sandals Whitehouse
- Ground: Frome Sports Complex; Westmoreland, Jamaica
- Capacity: 2,000
- Manager: Aaron Lawrence
- League: Red Stripe Premier League
- 2016–17: Western Confederation Super League, 1st
Home colours

Sandals South Coast FC is a Jamaican football club based in Westmoreland.

== History ==
When the football programme began at Sandals South Coast (then Sandals Whitehouse) in 2007 it was little more than a fun pastime for employees at the resort as part of the resort's existing Sports Programme. However, as enthusiasm began to grow for the sport among young men on resort, the Management team zoomed in on the available talent pool and started looking for ways in which to engage their interest. Coach Aaron Lawrence joined the team that year and soon Sandals South Coast had representation at the community/corner league level.

== Current squad ==
As of 10 March 2018.

Note: Flags indicate national team as defined under FIFA eligibility rules; some limited exceptions apply. Players may hold more than one non-FIFA nationality.

No.	Pos.	Nation	Player
—	DF	JAM	Delroy Davis
—	MF	JAM	Romaine Bennett
—	DF	JAM	Odorland Harding
—	DF	JAM	Michael Hurst
—	FW	JAM	O'Brien Bent
—	FW	JAM	Ron Daley
—	FW	JAM	Triston Sommerville
—	FW	JAM	Dervin Campbell
—	FW	JAM	Malik Reid
—	MF	JAM	Timar Lewis
—	FW	JAM	Jamoy Sibblies
—	DF	JAM	Corey Rodriques

No.	Pos.	Nation	Player
—	DF	JAM	Malik Quarrie
—	MF	JAM	Dwayne Blake
—	MF	JAM	Leonard Rankine
—	FW	JAM	Shemar Wright
—	DF	JAM	Dale Brown
—	DF	JAM	Jermaine Clarke
—	FW	JAM	Kenrick Clarke
—	FW	JAM	Dane Spence
—	GK	JAM	O'Brian Vennor
—	GK	JAM	Junior Stewart
—	MF	JAM	Lamar Aiken
—	MF	JAM	Denardo Kerr

== Honors ==
- Western Confederation Super League:
  - Winners (1): 2016–17
