= Kevaughn Isaacs =

Jamaican footballer (born 1996)

Personal information
- Date of birth: 12 January 1996 (age 30)
- Position: Midfielder

Team information
- Current team: Mount Pleasant
- Number: 18

Senior career*
Years	Team	Apps	(Gls)
2013–2014	Mile Gully		
2015–2018	Humble Lions	54	(6)
2018–	Mount Pleasant		

International career^{‡}
2018–	Jamaica	5	(0)
- * Club domestic league appearances and goals as of 16:22, 4 February 2019 (UTC) ‡ National team caps and goals as of 16:22, 14 March 2021 (UTC)

Kevaughn Isaacs (born 12 January 1996) is a Jamaican international footballer who plays for Mount Pleasant, as a midfielder.

== Career ==
Isaacs has played club football for Mile Gully, Humble Lions and Mount Pleasant.

He made his international debut for Jamaica in 2018.
