= Keithy Simpson =

Jamaican footballer (born 1990)

Personal information
- Date of birth: 19 April 1990 (age 36)
- Place of birth: Kingston, Jamaica
- Height: 6 ft 0 in (1.83 m)
- Positions: Midfielder; forward

Team information
- Current team: Dunbeholden F.C.

Youth career
- 2005–2007: Bull Bay F.C.

Senior career*
Years	Team	Apps	(Gls)
2007–2008	Cavalier S.C.		
2008–2011	Sporting Central Academy	18	(0)
2009	→ Whitecaps Residency (loan)	12	(1)
2011–2011	Portmore United F.C.	10	(0)
2011–2012	Tivoli Gardens F.C.	45	(5)
2012–2014	North East Stars F.C.	30	(3)
2014–2015	Vaasan Palloseura	21	(3)
2016	Águila		
2016	Club Sando		
2017	San Juan Jabloteh	10	(1)
2017–2020	Waterhouse F.C.		
2020–	Dunbeholden F.C.		

International career
2008–2009	Jamaica U20	12	(1)
2014	Jamaica	2	(0)
- * Club domestic league appearances and goals

Keithy Simpson (born 19 April 1990) is a Jamaican professional footballer who plays as a midfielder or forward.

== Club career ==
=== Youth and amateur ===
Simpson attended Donald Quarrie High School and Hydel High School in Jamaica and played club soccer for Sporting Central Academy before joining the youth academy of Canadian team Vancouver Whitecaps joining Jamaica youth national teammate Dever Orgill. He featured in matches against the youth academies of Eintracht Frankfurt and Leicester City at the XXIX Dallas Cup, and played in the USL Premier Development League with the Vancouver Whitecaps Residency team in 2009. He also traveled to Germany with the club and competed against the U-19 team of Hertha Berlin and others.

=== Senior ===
After featuring for Sporting Central Academy most of his career, Simpson move to Portmore United in January 2011. He spent 18 months with North East Stars FC of the TT Pro League from September 2012. In March 2014, Simpson signed with Vaasan Palloseura in Finland. In 2016, Simpson signed with Águila in El Salvador.

In September 2020, Simpson signed with Dunbeholden FC in the Jamaican top flight.

== International career ==
Simpson was a member of the Jamaica under-17 squad during the 2017 CONCACAF U-17 Championship qualifiers 2007 in Kingston, Jamaica and 2009 CONCACAF U-20 World Cup qualifiers in Scarborough, Tobago.

In August 2011, Simpson played in the CFU Olympic qualifiers in Suriname for Jamaica. On 30 May 2014, he made his debut for the Jamaica senior team against Switzerland, as a second-half substitute in Lucerne.

He was called up to play against Egypt on 4 June, and France on 8 June, but was unable to travel with the team due to club commitments.

On 9 September 2014 he earned his second cap in a 3–1 away defeat to Canada.
