= Colorado Murray =

Jamaican footballer (born 1995)

Personal information
- Date of birth: 23 January 1995 (age 31)
- Place of birth: Spanish Town, Jamaica
- Height: 1.76 m (5 ft 9 in)
- Position: Forward

Team information
- Current team: Fuerte San Francisco
- Number: 28

Senior career*
| Years | Team | Apps | (Gls) |
| 2016–2019 | Tivoli Gardens | 57 | (21) |
| 2019-2021 | Waterhouse | 27 | (12) |
| 2021-2022 | Harbour View | 27 | (12) |
| 2023 | FAS | 5 | (2) |
| 2022-2023 | Fuerte San Francisco | 19 | (1) |

International career^{‡}
| 2020– | Jamaica | 1 | (0) |
- * Club domestic league appearances and goals as of 27 May 2020 ‡ National team caps and goals as of 27 May 2020

Colorado Murray (born 23 January 1995) is a Jamaican footballer who currently plays for Fuerte San Francisco of the Salvadoran Primera División.

Played for Excelsior High School.

== Club ==
In August 2020 Murray signed with Waterhouse.

== International ==
In February 2019 Murray was invited to train with the Jamaican senior team. He made his international debut for the Reggae Boyz in a friendly against Bermuda on 11 March 2020.
