= Omar Edwards =

Jamaican football coach

Personal information
- Date of birth: 30 May 1980 (age 46)
- Place of birth: Clarendon, Jamaica

Youth career
- Years: Team
- Dunoon Technical

Managerial career
- 2016–2019: Tivoli Gardens
- 2019–2022: Turks and Caicos Islands
- 2023–2024: Cheshire Hall
- 2025–: Turks and Caicos Islands U17

Omar Edwards (born 30 May 1980) is a Jamaican football coach, former manager of the Turks and Caicos Islands.

== Coaching career ==
In 2004, Edwards was appointed under-20 coach of Boys' Town, before moving up to coaching the club's under-21 team. Edwards later was named assistant head coach of Boys' Town. In 2010, Edwards joined the coaching staff at Jamaica's U17 side, before leaving in 2017.

From 2016 to 2019, Edwards was manager of the top flight Jamaica National Premier League club Tivoli Gardens. In March 2019, Edwards was appointed manager of the Turks and Caicos Islands.

== Managerial statistics ==
As of 14 June 2022

Team	From	To	Record				
Team	From	To	G	W	D	L	Win %
Turks and Caicos Islands	2019	2022	11	4	0	7	36.36
