= Molynes United F.C. =

Jamaican football club

- Full name: Molynes United Football Club
- Founded: 1991
- Ground: Jacisera Park
- Capacity: TBD
- Owner: Eurado Cornwall
- Chairman: Kymani Robinson
- Manager: Oshane Boyd
- Coach: Imani Gaylord
- League: Jamaica Premier League
- 2025–26: Regular season: 12th Playoffs: Did not qualify
colours

Molynes United Football Club is a Jamaican football club located in Kingston. They were promoted to the Jamaica Premier League in 2019.

Molynes United F.C. play their home games at Jacisera Park since 2018 after their old Chalmers Avenue ground was taken over by Digicel. They have also played matches in Constant Spring, including to start off their Jamaica Premier League tenure as Jacisera Park's stand was not complete in time for the start of the 2019–20 Jamaica Premier League season.

== History ==
Molynes United F.C. were founded in 1991.

Molynes United F.C. were promoted to the Jamaica Premier League in 2019 after winning their first five matches in the promotion play-offs. The club were led in their push by head coach Lijyasu Simms, who has helped three different teams gain promotion to Jamaica's top flight. They defeated Portmore United F.C. 3–0 in their inaugural Jamaica Premier League fixture.

== Coaching staff ==
Jermaine Thomas has served as head coach of Molynes United in the Jamaica Premier League era.In July 2025, former Jamaica international Wolry Wolfe joined the club's technical staff as assistant head coach, alongside assistant coach Xavian Virgo.

== Season-by-season ==
Season	Division	Pos	Pld	W	D	L	GF	GA	GD	Pts	Notes
2019–20	Jamaica Premier League	10	24	7	6	11	28	39	-11	27	Season ended early (COVID-19)
2021	Jamaica Premier League	10	10	1	4	5	8	16	-8	7	
2022	Jamaica Premier League	11	22	4	3	15	23	44	-21	15	
2022–23	Jamaica Premier League	9	25	8	6	11	36	46	-10	30	
2023–24	Jamaica Premier League	11	26	5	8	13	29	55	-26	23	
2024–25	Jamaica Premier League	12	39	9	8	22	40	76	-36	35	

== Current squad ==
As of 10 November 2023

Note: Flags indicate national team as defined under FIFA eligibility rules; some limited exceptions apply. Players may hold more than one non-FIFA nationality.

No.	Pos.	Nation	Player
3	DF	JAM	Tajay Cooper
5	DF	JAM	Enrique Gordon
6	DF	JAM	Taraj Andrews
7	MF	JAM	Jermy Nelson
8	MF	JAM	Jhanni Flemmings
9	FW	JAM	Thorn Simpson
10	FW	JAM	Jason Wright
11	MF	JAM	Rashawn Livingston
12	MF	JAM	Sujae Mcbean
13	MF	JAM	Jaheim Palmer

No.	Pos.	Nation	Player
14	DF	JAM	Sergeni Frankson
15	MF	JAM	Stevo Reid
17	MF	JAM	Marvin Williams
20	FW	JAM	Tyreak O'Connor
22	MF	JAM	Jevaughn Brown
23	FW	JAM	Richard Gooden
34	GK	JAM	Maximus Davis
41	FW	JAM	Tevin Olando Scott
50	DF	JAM	Kevin Pilgrim
99	GK	JAM	Zandrey Mcleod

=== Other players under contract ===
Note: Flags indicate national team as defined under FIFA eligibility rules; some limited exceptions apply. Players may hold more than one non-FIFA nationality.

No.	Pos.	Nation	Player
—	DF	JAM	Jowell Powell
—	DF	JAM	Dijon Grant
—	GK	JAM	Peter Harrison
—	MF	JAM	Daniel Hardy
—	MF	JAM	Shamaro Dennis
—	GK	JAM	Joshua Clarke
—	MF	JAM	Omario Cunningham
