= Prison Oval =

Multi-use stadium in Spanish Town, Jamaica

- Prison Oval (Jamaica)
- Interactive map of Prison Oval
- Location: Spanish Town, Jamaica
- Coordinates: 17.9926°N 76.9506°W
- Capacity: 2000
- Field size: Approximately 120 metres (390 ft) x 100 metres (330 ft)

Prison Oval is a multi-use stadium in Spanish Town, Jamaica, currently used mostly for football matches. It serves as the home ground of Dunbeholden F.C. and Rivoli United FC. The stadium holds 2,000 people.

The name 'Prison Oval' is attributed to it being on the same property as the maximum security Saint Catherine Prison. Some prisoners are able to watch matches and other events from their cells.

It is featured in the Barrington Levy song "Prison Oval Rock".
