= Montego Bay United F.C. =

Jamaican football club

Montego Bay United
- Full name: Montego Bay United Football Club
- Nickname: Seba
- Founded: 1972 (as Beacon)
- Ground: Catherine Hall Sports Complex; Montego Bay, Jamaica
- Capacity: 7,000
- President: Yoni Epstein
- Manager: Mohamed Yusuf
- League: Jamaica Premier League
- 2025–26: Regular season: 2nd Playoffs: 4th place
- Website: https://montegobayunitedfc.com/
Home colours	Away colours

Montego Bay United Football Club is a Jamaican professional football club based in Montego Bay.

== History ==
Founded as Beacon in 1972, the club were renamed Seba United after a few years and won the Jamaica Premier League in 1987 and 1997; the most famous of these triumphs was the 1996–97 season when they were docked twenty points but still found a way to the lift the title. The club used to play their home games at Jarrett Park, which can hold a capacity of up to 4,000, and is located in Montego Bay.

Seba were relegated from the Jamaica Premier League after the 2007–08 season for the first time in their storied history and played in the Western Confederation Super League, before returning to Jamaica's top level for the 2011–12 season after winning the promotion play-offs. Successful Peruvian coach Danilo Barriga however left the club just a few weeks before the end of the season.

In July 2011, the franchise was acquired by Orville Powell and renamed and rebranded as Montego Bay United F.C, despite earlier claims by former chairman Bruce Gaynor it would not ever happen. They used to play their home games at Montego Bay Sports Complex, Montego Bay.

In 2013 they moved to the WespoW Park stadium in the Tucker area of Montego Bay. They were premier league champions, having won the 2015–16 season.

In July 2016, the club assigned Serbian coach Slaviša Božičić as their new manager.

In August 2019, Somali coach Mohamed Yusuf was appointed as the manager.

In January 2022, Ricky Hill became the manager.

== Current squad ==
As of 25 September 2026

Note: Flags indicate national team as defined under FIFA eligibility rules; some limited exceptions apply. Players may hold more than one non-FIFA nationality.

No.	Pos.	Nation	Player
1	GK	LCA	Vino Barclett
2	DF	JAM	Renaldo Wellington
3	DF	SUR	Zerguinho Deira
4	DF	JAM	Tajay Cooper
5	MF	PAN	Jesús Murillo
6	MF	BRA	Lucas Correa
7	MF	JAM	Malachi Sterling
8	MF	JAM	Jermy Nelson
9	FW	JAM	Damorney Hutchinson
10	FW	JAM	Dwight Merrick
11	FW	JAM	Jourdaine Fletcher
12	FW	JAM	Timar Lewis
13	DF	JAM	Deverow Mckenzie
14	DF	JAM	Okeemo Jones
15	FW	JAM	Nashordo Gibbs
16	MF	JAM	Jahmar Stevens

No.	Pos.	Nation	Player
17	MF	LCA	Kegan Caull
18	DF	JAM	Jovan Gordon
19	DF	JAM	Phillando Wing
20	DF	JAM	Janoi Williams
21	FW	JAM	Richardo Ramsey
23	MF	JAM	Deonjay Brown
25	FW	USA	Alonzo Peart
26	MF	TTO	Che Benny
27	FW	JAM	Courtney Allen
30	GK	JAM	Davonnie Burton
31	MF	HAI	Gerson Gabriel
32	FW	JAM	Kimani Arbourine
40	GK	JAM	Jaheim Williams
72	FW	JAM	Devonte Campbell
—	DF	LCA	Melvin Doxilly
—	FW	JAM	Owayne Gordon

=== Other players under contract ===
Note: Flags indicate national team as defined under FIFA eligibility rules; some limited exceptions apply. Players may hold more than one non-FIFA nationality.

No. / Pos. / Nation / Player	No. / Pos. / Nation / Player

== Achievements ==
=== Domestic ===
- Jamaica Premier League
  - Champions (4): 1986–87, 1996–97, 2013–14, 2015–16
  - Runners-up (5): 1984–85, 1988–89, 1993–94, 1997–98, 2014–15
- JFF Champions Cup
  - Champions (1): 1992 (as Seba United)
- Western Confederation Super League
  - Champions (1): 2011 (as Seba United)

=== Continental ===
- Caribbean Club Championship
  - Runners-up (1): 1997
  - Third place (1): 2015
