= Admiral Bailey =

Jamaican dancehall deejay

Admiral Bailey OD
- Born: Glendon Orville Bailey; 15 March 1966 (age 60)
- Origin: Kingston, Jamaica
- Genres: Reggae, dancehall
- Instrument: Vocals
- Years active: late 1980s–present
- Labels: VP; Powerhouse; Dynamic

Admiral Bailey (born Glendon Orville Bailey, 15 March 1966, Kingston, Jamaica) is a Jamaican dancehall deejay who enjoyed his greatest success between the mid-1980s and the early 1990s. He now lives in Jamaica. He has been described as "the hottest dancehall star of the late 1980s".

== Career ==
Bailey had worked on U-Roy's King Sturgav Hi-Fi sound system and was taken to King Jammy's studio in Waterhouse by Josey Wales. He started a string of hits with a duet with Chaka Demus, "One Scotch, One Bourbon, One Beer", which was followed by "Politician" (based on Larry Marshall's 1969 hit "Throw Me Corn"), "Chatty Chatty Mouth", "Ballot Box" (with Josey Wales) and, in 1987, the slack "Punaany" (with a lyric that included "Gimme Punaany, Want punaany, Any punaany is the same punaany"), which was initially banned from radio play until it was re-recorded with a less offensive lyric, retitled "Healthy Body". His debut album, Kill Them With It, was released in 1987 and he went on to record for producers such as Papa Biggy and Donovan Germain. He recorded further for Penthouse Records ("Help") in 1990 and Bobby Digital ("Ah Nuh Sin") in 1991. In 1993, he began working with Jammy again. In the 1990s he became known as a "clean" deejay, eschewing the slackness of many of his contemporaries. He recorded with Byron Lee on some of the latter's big soca hits, and even starred in television commercials for banks.

== Discography ==
- Kill Them With It (1987) Jammys/Live & Love
- Dancehall Showcase Vol. 2: M.C.'s Clash (1987) Mango (with Tonto Irie)
- Undisputed (1988) Dynamic
- Ram Up You Party (1988) Powerhouse
- Science Again (1989) Rohit
- Born Champion (1991) Jammys/Live & Love
- Original (1991) VP
- Mi Big Up (1992) VP
- Undisputed Champion (1993) Rhino
- Best of Reggae: Live (2006) Super Power
