= Railway Oval =

Edward Seaga Sports Complex
- Railway Oval
- Interactive map of Edward Seaga Sports Complex
- Full name: Edward Seaga Sports Complex
- Location: Tivoli Gardens, Kingston
- Coordinates: 17°58′13″N 76°47′58″W
- Capacity: 5000
- Surface: Grass

Tenant
- Tivoli Gardens FC

Edward Seaga Sports Complex, commonly known as Railway Oval, is a multi-use stadium in Kingston, Jamaica. It is used mostly for football matches. It serves as a home ground of Tivoli Gardens FC. The stadium holds 5,000 people. In 1987, 12,000 spectators attended a Jamaican cup match with Tivoli Gardens at the stadium.

It was officially renamed the Edward Seaga Sports Complex in 2004.
