= Dunbeholden F.C. =

- Full name: Dunbeholden Football Club
- Founded: 1992; 34 years ago
- Stadium: Dunbeholden Sports Complex, Portmore, Jamaica
- Capacity: 2,000
- General Manager: (Jamaica) Roger Simmonds
- Head Coach: (Jamaica) Lenworth Hyde
- League: Jamaica Premier League
- 2025–26: Regular season: 9th Playoffs: Did not qualify
Home colours	Away colours

Dunbeholden Football Club is a Jamaican football club based in the community of Dunbeholden in Portmore, Jamaica. The club competes in the Jamaica Premier League since gaining promotion at the start of the 2018–19 season.

== History ==
The club was founded in 1992 by Donovan Witter. Since its inception the club competed exclusively in the South Central Confederation regional leagues until gaining promotion to the Jamaica Premier League. Dunbeholden defeated Wadadah F.C. 4-0 in the 2017-18 Magnum/Charley's JB Promotion Playoffs to gain promotion to Jamaica’s premier football competition.

After a hard start to the first season of premier league football, Dunbeholden dug deep to lift themselves out of the relegation zone and remain in the top flight. In the 2022 Jamaica Premier League season Dumbeholden finished runners-up in their first ever JPL finals appearance to mark their best premier league finish to date. The runners-up result sealed Dunbeholden a spot in the inaugural 2023 CONCACAF Caribbean Cup.

The kick-off to the 2023 CONCACAF Caribbean Cup marked an historic occasion for Dumbeholden Football Club, it being the club’s first ever appearance in an international competition and the first time a CONCACAF Caribbean Cup kicked-off in Jamaica between two Jamaican clubs.

== Supporters ==
The community of Dunbeholden is nestled off the south-eastern end of Salt Pond Road, a major thoroughfare that joins the cities of Spanish Town and Portmore. Because of its geographical location, the club boasts large fanbases in both St. Catherine cities. After securing promotion to the Jamaica Premier League for the 2018-19 season, the club decided to play their home games at Prison Oval in Spanish Town. With ambitions to bring football back to their community, the St. Catherine-based club broke ground on their home field in 2019 to improve the facility to meet required Jamaica Football Federation (JFF) standards.

=== Rivalries ===
==== Portmore Derby ====
Because of Dunbeholden’s rise in status as an established premier league team that regularly competes for playoffs positions and their close proximity to league giants Portmore United, a local derby between the two clubs have developed. Dubbed the Portmore Derby, the matchup is hotly contested and is regularly impactful on the end of season playoffs places.

== Players ==
=== Current squad ===
As of 22 March 2024

Note: Flags indicate national team as defined under FIFA eligibility rules; some limited exceptions apply. Players may hold more than one non-FIFA nationality.

No.	Pos.	Nation	Player
3	DF	JAM	Kevin Graham
5	DF	JAM	Dimitri Edwards
6	MF	JAM	Dwayne Smith
7	DF	JAM	Ricardo Thomas
8	MF	JAM	Fabian McCarthy
9	FW	JAM	Marlon Allen
10	FW	JAM	Nicholas Nelson
12	FW	JAM	Stephen Williams
14	DF	GUY	Jaleei Alcindor
15	MF	JAM	Nickoi Roberts
16	MF	JAM	Brian Burkett
17	MF	JAM	Theon Cupee
18	DF	JAM	Chevoy Watkin
19	MF	JAM	Donovan Segree
20		JAM	Tyreak O'Connor
21	MF	JAM	Shakeen Powell
22	DF	JAM	Zackiya Wilks
23	MF	JAM	Malachi Douglas
24	DF	JAM	Saneeki Burton
25	MF	JAM	Tyrese Gowe

No.	Pos.	Nation	Player
26	FW	JAM	Dwight Merrick
27	MF	JAM	Rojay Smith
28	MF	JAM	Shawn Daley
29	FW	JAM	Carlington Blackwood
30	DF	JAM	Devonti Hodges
31	GK	JAM	Damion Hyatt
33	MF	JAM	Alex Gayle
45	MF	JAM	Ajuma Johnson
50	GK	JAM	Leonardo Saunders
—	DF	JAM	Jonoy Cunningham
—	DF	JAM	Ricardo Beckford
—	DF	JAM	Shevan James
—	DF	JAM	Tyrese Wynter
—	MF	JAM	Clive Wedderburn
—	MF	JAM	Conaie Rose
—	MF	JAM	Romone Small
—	FW	JAM	Antonio Radcliffe
—	FW	JAM	Damari Deacon
—	FW	JAM	Ewan Barton
—	FW	JAM	Nicque Daley

== Honors ==
=== Domestic ===
- Jamaica Premier League
  - Runners-up (1): 2022
