= UWI F.C. =

Jamaican football club

University of the West Indies F.C.
- Full name: University of the West Indies Football Club
- Nickname: Pelicans
- Dissolved: 2021
- Ground: UWI Bowl, Mona, St. Andrew Parish
- Capacity: 3000
- League: National Premier League
- 2018–19: Regular season: 6th Playoffs: Quarterfinals

University of the West Indies Football Club (commonly abbreviated UWI F.C.), was a Jamaican association football club based at the Mona campus of the University of the West Indies, near Kingston. They were promoted to the National Premier League for first time after the 2014–15 season. During their first season in Jamaica's top division in 2015–16, the club finished one point out of the championship play-offs.
