= Tivoli Gardens F.C. =

Jamaican football club

- Full name: Tivoli Gardens Football Club
- Nickname: T.G.
- Founded: 1970
- Ground: Edward Seaga Sports Complex (Railway Oval); Tivoli Gardens, Kingston, Jamaica
- Capacity: 5,000
- President: Edward Seaga
- Coach: Jerome Waite
- League: Jamaica Premier League
- 2025–26: Regular season: 10th
Home colours	Away colours

Tivoli Gardens Football Club is a Jamaican football club, based in Kingston. The club's senior team competes in the Jamaica Premier League. The club has won the Jamaica Premier League title 5 times and the JFF Champions Cup 3 times. Their home stadium is the Railway oval.

== History ==
Founded in 1970, Tivoli Gardens Football Club was previously headed by former Prime Minister the late Rt Hon Edward Seaga, who served as Member of Parliament for forty years. Five-times national champions, they won their first Premier League title in 1983.

The club operates on lands previously home to the Jamaica Railway Corporation. The grounds are laid and the sight of old railcars. A number of major companies post their billboards on the complex which provides valuable cash to meet operational and development needs.

=== Recent seasons ===
The club won the National Premier League championship in 2003–04 and was runner up in 2004–05. They also won the Red Stripe Cup 2006, by overturning the fortunes of Portmore United, who led up to the 70th minute of play. They also won the 2008–09 Digicel Premier League on the final match day.

The senior coaches for the last years have been Glendon "Admiral" Bailey, who is well known in entertainment circles, and Calvert Fitzgerald, formerly of NPL rivals Waterhouse and Rivoli United who had been replaced by Desmond Francis for the 2007–08 season.

== Club identity, politics and rivalry with Waterhouse FC ==
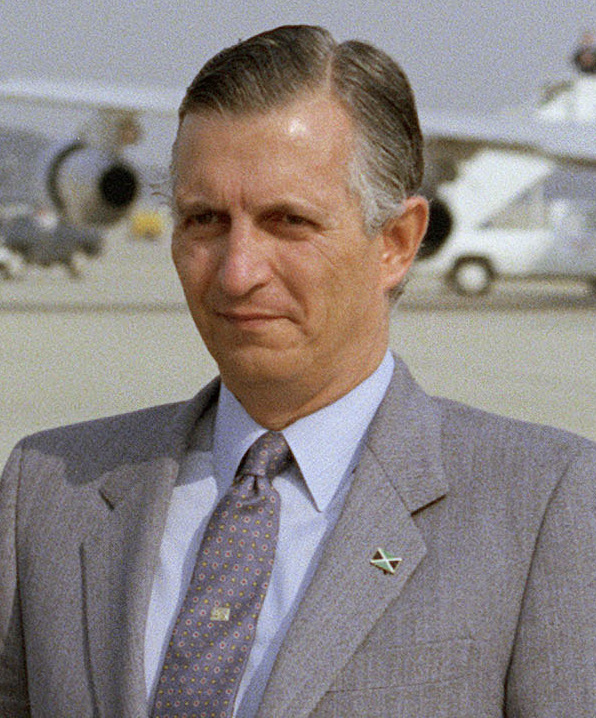
Tivoli Gardens are heavily linked to Jamaican political leader Edward Seaga and his political party the Jamaica Labour Party.

Tivoli Gardens are heavily linked with the centre-right Jamaica Labour Party and specifically Edward Seaga. The football club emerged from the redevelopment of the Back-O-Wall area in Kingston during the 1970s, a project led by Seaga when he was Housing Minister. This redevelopment transformed a poor neighbourhood into a model community that became a JLP stronghold, with housing allocated largely to party supporters. The club itself became more than just a sporting institution, acting as a symbol of the JLP’s presence and influence in West Kingston. Tivoli Gardens' home ground is named the Edward Seaga Sports Complex. Seaga’s ongoing involvement with the club helped to reinforce the political identity of both the community and the team.

Under the leadership of Seaga and other JLP-affiliated figures, Tivoli Gardens FC achieved notable success in Jamaican football, winning multiple national titles. These victories were often celebrated as extensions of the party’s dominance in the area, tying the club’s fortunes closely to the political dynamics of the community. Despite these strong partisan links, the club has also played a role in moments of political reconciliation, such as the historic 2003 match against Waterhouse FC, a team associated with the rival centre-left People’s National Party. This match, attended by leaders from both parties, and was a significant attempt to end partisanship in Jamaica. However, in 2017 it was noted by The Jamaica Star that both Tivoli Gardens and Waterhouse remained deeply connected to their respective political counterparts, referring to the teams as "Garrison Clubs".

== Current squad ==
As of 24 November 2023

Note: Flags indicate national team as defined under FIFA eligibility rules; some limited exceptions apply. Players may hold more than one non-FIFA nationality.

No.	Pos.	Nation	Player
1	GK	JAM	Nicholas Clarke
3	FW	JAM	Odean Pennycooke
4	MF	JAM	Nathan Thomas
5	DF	JAM	Barrington Pryce
6	MF	JAM	Horatio Morgan
7	FW	JAM	Howard Morris
8	FW	JAM	Diego Mckenzie
9	DF	JAM	Justin Dunn
10	FW	JAM	Rodico Wellington
11	MF	JAM	Anthony Nelson

No.	Pos.	Nation	Player
16	DF	JAM	Richard Brown
19	FW	JAM	Kimarley Smith
24	FW	JAM	Shaquille Jones
26	DF	JAM	Christopher Matthews
27	MF	JAM	Tkiven Garnett
29	DF	JAM	Keno Simpson
31	DF	JAM	Alton Lewis
33	GK	JAM	Kewong Watkins
34	MF	JAM	Anthony Thompson
50	FW	JAM	Shamar Bloomfield

=== Other players under contract ===
Note: Flags indicate national team as defined under FIFA eligibility rules; some limited exceptions apply. Players may hold more than one non-FIFA nationality.

No.	Pos.	Nation	Player
12	MF	JAM	Rick-Quan Coke
14	MF	JAM	Dwight Mckenzie
15	FW	JAM	Carlton Salmon
18	MF	JAM	Nakeel Wright
21	FW	JAM	Nickalia Fuller

No.	Pos.	Nation	Player
28	DF	JAM	Rolando Stephenson
30	MF	JAM	Jah-Neil Wray
36	FW	JAM	Chen-Ries Calder
40	GK	JAM	Diego Haughton

== Honours ==
=== Regional ===
- Caribbean Club Championship
  - Runner-up (1): 2004

=== Domestic ===
- Jamaica Premier League
  - Champions (5): 1982–83, 1998–99, 2003–04, 2008–09, 2010–11
  - Runners-up (4): 1983–84, 2004–05, 2007–08, 2009–10
- JFF Champions Cup
  - Champions (3): 1999, 2006, 2011
- KSAFA Jackie Bell Knockout Competition
  - Winners (6): 1993–94, 2003–04, 2008–09, 2013–14, 2016–17, 2017–18
  - Runners-up (3): 1998–99, 1999–2000, 2004–05

=== Doubles ===
- League & JFF Champions Cup (2): 1998–99, 2010–11

== Former players ==
- (Jamaica) Christopher Nicholas
- (Jamaica) Ricardo Fuller
- (Jamaica) Jermaine Johnson

== Managers ==
- (Jamaica) Calvert Fitzgerald (2006–07)
- (Jamaica) Desmond Francis (2007)
- (Jamaica) Glendon "Admiral" Bailey (2008)
- (Jamaica) Lenworth Hyde sr. (2008–10)
- (Jamaica) Desmond Francis (2010)
- (Jamaica) Glendon "Admiral" Bailey (2010–2011)
