= 2024 CONCACAF Caribbean Cup knockout stage =

Stage of the association football tournament

The 2024 CONCACAF Caribbean Cup knockout stage was played from 23 October to 3 December 2024. A total of 4 teams competed in the knockout stage to decide the champions of the 2024 CONCACAF Caribbean Cup.

== Qualified teams ==
The winners and runners-up of each of the four groups in the group stage advanced to the quarter-finals.

Group	Winners	Runners-up
A	(Jamaica) Cavalier	(Haiti) Real Hope
B	(Dominican Republic) Cibao	(Dominican Republic) Moca

== Format ==
The knockout stage was played on a single-elimination tournament with the following rules:

- Each tie was played on a home-and-away two-legged basis. The home team of the second leg in each tie was determined separately for each round as follows (Regulations Article 12.9):
  - In the semi-finals, the group winners hosted the second leg.
  - In the finals, the higher-ranked team based on total points accumulated in the group stage and semi-finals hosted the second leg.
- In the semi-finals, if tied on aggregate, the away goals rule would be used. If still tied, the penalty shoot-out would be directly used to determine the winners (Regulations Article 12.8.2).
- In the third place play-offs and finals, if tied on aggregate, the away goals rule would also be used. If still tied, 30 minutes of extra time would be played but the away goals scored during this time would not serve as a tie-breaking criteria. If still tied after extra time, the penalty shoot-out would be used to determine the winner (Regulations Article 12.8.3).

== Bracket ==
The bracket of the final stages was determined as follows:

Round	Matchups
Semi-finals	(Group winner team host second leg): Match SF1: Group B runners-up vs. Group A winners; Match SF2: Group A runners-up vs. Group B winners
Third place play-offs	(Higher-ranked team host second leg): Loser SF1 vs. Loser SF2
Finals	(Higher-ranked team host second leg): Winner SF1 vs. Winner SF2

The bracket was pre-determined as follows.

Semi-finals
(Haiti) Real Hope	2	0	2
(Dominican Republic) Cibao	3	1	4
(Dominican Republic) Moca	0	0	0
(Jamaica) Cavalier	0	7	7

Finals
(Jamaica) Cavalier (a)	1	1	2
(Dominican Republic) Cibao	0	2	2
Third place
(Haiti) Real Hope	1	3	4
(Dominican Republic) Moca	0	2	2

== Semi-finals ==
=== Summary ===
The first legs were played on 23 and 24 October, and the second legs were played on 30 and 31 October 2024.

Team 1	Agg.	Team 2	1st leg	2nd leg
Real Hope (Haiti)	2–4	(Dominican Republic) Cibao	2–3	0–1
Moca (Dominican Republic)	0–7	(Jamaica) Cavalier	0–0	0–7

=== Matches ===
23 October 2024
20:00

Real Hope (Haiti)	2–3	(Dominican Republic) Cibao
Exilus 11' (pen.), 83'	Report	López 4'; Díaz 49'; Correa 90+1' (pen.)

Track and field stadium of PUCMM, Santiago de los Caballeros, (Dominican Republic) (Note: Real Hope played their home match at the track and field stadium of PUCMM, Santiago de los Caballeros (Dominican Republic) instead of their regular stadium Parc Saint-Victor, Cap-Haïtien due to the ongoing civil unrest and violence in Haiti.)
Referee: Steffon Dewar (Jamaica)
31 October 2024
20:00

Cibao (Dominican Republic)	1–0	(Haiti) Real Hope
Correa 10'	Report

Estadio Cibao FC, Santiago de los Caballeros
Referee: Shavin Greene (Guyana)

Cibao won 4–2 on aggregate, advanced to the finals and qualify for the 2025 CONCACAF Champions Cup Round One at minimum. Real Hope advanced to the third place play-off.

24 October 2024
20:00

Moca (Dominican Republic)	0–0	(Jamaica) Cavalier
	Report

Estadio Complejo Deportivo Moca 86, Moca
Referee: José Torres (Puerto Rico)
30 October 2024
20:00 (19:00 UTC−5)

Cavalier (Jamaica)	7–0	(Dominican Republic) Moca
Auvray 1', 51'; Stein 6', 45+3', 62'; Ainsworth 39' (pen.); Atkinson 79' (pen.)	Report

National Stadium, Kingston
Referee: Filip Dujic (Canada)

Cavalier won 7–0 on aggregate, advanced to the finals and qualify for the 2025 CONCACAF Champions Cup Round One at minimum. Moca advanced to the third place play-off.

== Third place play-offs ==
In the third place play-offs, the team which had the better performances across all previous rounds (group stage and semi-finals) hosted the second leg.

Pos	Team	Pld	W	D	L	GF	GA	GD	Pts	Host
1	(Dominican Republic) Moca	6	3	2	1	8	11	−3	11	Second leg
2	(Haiti) Real Hope	6	2	2	2	7	6	+1	8	First leg

Source: CONCACAF
Rules for classification: 1) Points; 2) Goal difference; 3) Goals scored; 4) Away goals scored; 5) Wins; 6) Away wins; 7) Disciplinary points (1 point for yellow card, 3 points for second yellow card/indirect red card, 4 points for direct red card, 5 points for yellow card and direct red card); 8) Drawing of lots (Regulations Article 12.11.4).

=== Summary ===
Team 1	Agg.	Team 2	1st leg	2nd leg
Real Hope (Haiti)	4–2	(Dominican Republic) Moca	1–0	3–2

=== Matches ===
26 November 2024
19:00

Real Hope (Haiti)	1–0	(Dominican Republic) Moca
Joseph 8'	Report

Estadio Cibao FC, Santiago de los Caballeros, (Dominican Republic) (Note: Real Hope played their home match at Estadio Cibao FC, Santiago de los Caballeros (Dominican Republic) instead of their regular stadium Parc Saint-Victor, Cap-Haïtien due to the ongoing civil unrest and violence in Haiti.)
Referee: Odette Hamilton (Jamaica)
3 December 2024
17:30

Moca (Dominican Republic)	2–3	(Haiti) Real Hope
de Peña 71', 79'	Report	Exilus 66'; Saint-Fleur 90'; Intervil 90+5'

Estadio Complejo Deportivo Moca 86, Moca
Referee: Víctor Rivas (United States)

Real Hope won 4–2 on aggregate and qualified for the 2025 CONCACAF Champions Cup Round One.

== Finals ==
In the finals, the team which had the better performances across all previous rounds (group stage and semi-finals) hosted the second leg.

Pos	Team	Pld	W	D	L	GF	GA	GD	Pts	Host
1	(Dominican Republic) Cibao	6	5	1	0	13	6	+7	16	Second leg
2	(Jamaica) Cavalier	6	4	1	1	18	4	+14	13	First leg

Source: CONCACAF
Rules for classification: 1) Points; 2) Goal difference; 3) Goals scored; 4) Away goals scored; 5) Wins; 6) Away wins; 7) Disciplinary points (1 point for yellow card, 3 points for second yellow card/indirect red card, 4 points for direct red card, 5 points for yellow card and direct red card); 8) Drawing of lots (Regulations Article 12.11.4).

=== Summary ===
Team 1	Agg.	Team 2	1st leg	2nd leg
Cavalier (Jamaica)	2–2 (a)	(Dominican Republic) Cibao	1–0	1–2

=== Matches ===
26 November 2024
20:00 (19:00 UTC−5)

Cavalier (Jamaica)	1–0	(Dominican Republic) Cibao
Stein 20'	Report

National Stadium, Kingston
Referee: Kwinsi Williams (Trinidad and Tobago)
3 December 2024
19:00

Cibao (Dominican Republic)	2–1	(Jamaica) Cavalier
Díaz 27' (pen.); Correa 28'	Report	Atkinson 54'

Estadio Cibao FC, Santiago de los Caballeros
Referee: Reon Radix (Grenada)

Tied 2–2 on aggregate, Cavalier won on away goals and qualified for the 2025 CONCACAF Champions Cup Round of 16.
