= 2025 CONCACAF Caribbean Cup group stage =

Football group stage

The 2025 CONCACAF Caribbean Cup group stage was played from 19 August to 2 October 2025. A total of ten teams competed in the group stage to decide the four places in the knockout stage of the 2025 CONCACAF Caribbean Cup.

== Draw ==
The draw for the group stage was held on 3 June 2025 at 17:00 EDT (UTC−4) in Miami, Florida, United States. The ten involved teams were previously seeded into five pots of two teams each based on their CONCACAF Club Ranking as of 2 June 2025, except for the teams in pot 5, which was reserved for the champions and runners-up of the 2025 CFU Club Shield.

Pot	Team	Rank	Pts
1	(Dominican Republic) Cibao	80	1,066
1	(Jamaica) Mount Pleasant	86	1,058
2	(Jamaica) Cavalier	91	1,052
2	(Suriname) Robinhood	101	1,042
3	(Trinidad and Tobago) Defence Force	104	1,040
3	(Dominican Republic) O&M	132	1,001
4	(Haiti) Juventus des Cayes	136	993
4	(Trinidad and Tobago) Central	168	937
5	(Dominican Republic) Moca	—	
5	(Barbados) Weymouth Wales	—	

Notes

1. ^{CCS} The identity of the champions (Moca) and runners-up (Weymouth Wales) of the 2025 CFU Club Shield was not known at the time the pots were determined.

For the group stage, the ten teams were drawn into two groups (Groups A and B) of five containing a team from each of the five pots. Teams from pot 1 were drawn first and were placed in the first position of their group, starting with Group A and then Group B. The same procedure was followed for teams from pots 2, 3, 4 and 5, and they were placed in positions 2, 3, 4 and 5, respectively, within the group to which they were drawn. Each group must contain no more than two clubs from the same national association. No restrictions were applied at the time of drawing the groups.

The draw resulted in the following groups:

Group A
Pos	Team
A1	(Jamaica) Mount Pleasant
A2	(Suriname) Robinhood
A3	(Dominican Republic) O&M
A4	(Trinidad and Tobago) Central
A5	(Dominican Republic) Moca

Group B
Pos	Team
B1	(Dominican Republic) Cibao
B2	(Jamaica) Cavalier
B3	(Trinidad and Tobago) Defence Force
B4	(Haiti) Juventus des Cayes
B5	(Barbados) Weymouth Wales

Notes

1. ^{CCS} The identity of the champions (Moca) and runners-up (Weymouth Wales) of the 2025 CFU Club Shield was not known at the time of the draw.

== Format ==
In the group stage, each group was played on a single home-and-away round-robin basis, with teams playing against each other once, for a total of four matches per team (two home and two away). The teams were ranked according to the following criteria (Regulations Article 12.8.1).:

1. Points (3 points for a win, 1 point for a draw, and 0 points for a loss);
2. Goal difference;
3. Goals scored;
4. If two or more teams were still tied after applying the above criteria, their rankings were determined as follows:
  1. Points in the matches played among the tied teams;
  2. Goal difference in the matches played among the tied teams (if more than two teams were equal on points);
  3. Goals scored in the matches played among the tied teams (if more than two teams were equal on points);
  4. The lowest number of disciplinary points, based on the following criteria:
    1. Yellow card: plus 1 point;
    2. Second yellow card/indirect red card: plus 3 points;
    3. Direct red card: plus 4 points;;
    4. Yellow card and direct red card: plus 5 points;
5. Drawing of lots by CONCACAF.

The winners and runners-up of each group advanced to the semi-finals of the knockout stage.

== Schedule ==
Matches in the competition were played on either Tuesday, Wednesday, or Thursday as decided by CONCACAF. The schedule of each week was as follows (Regulations Article 2).

Weeks	Dates	Matches
Week 1	19–21 August	Team 1 vs. Team 2, Team 3 vs. Team 4
Week 2	26–28 August	Team 5 vs. Team 1, Team 2 vs. Team 4
Week 3	16–18 September	Team 4 vs. Team 5, Team 2 vs. Team 3
Week 4	23–25 September	Team 4 vs. Team 1, Team 3 vs. Team 5
Week 5	30 September – 1 October	Team 1 vs. Team 3, Team 5 vs. Team 2

== Groups ==
All match times are in EDT (UTC−4) and local times, if different, are in parentheses as listed by CONCACAF.

=== Group A ===
Pos	Team	Pld	W	D	L	GF	GA	GD	Pts	Qualification	MTP	O&M	ROB	CEN	MOC
1	(Jamaica) Mount Pleasant	4	4	0	0	7	0	+7	12	Advance to semi-finals	—	2–0	1–0	—	—
2	(Dominican Republic) O&M	4	2	0	2	6	5	+1	6	Advance to semi-finals	—	—	—	2–0	1–2
3	(Suriname) Robinhood	4	1	1	2	5	6	−1	4		—	1–3	—	2–2	—
4	(Trinidad and Tobago) Central	4	1	1	2	4	6	−2	4		0–2	—	—	—	2–0
5	(Dominican Republic) Moca	4	1	0	3	2	7	−5	3		0–2	—	0–2	—	—

Source: CONCACAF
19 August 2025
20:00 (19:00 UTC−5)

Mount Pleasant (Jamaica)	1–0	(Suriname) Robinhood
McCalla 35'	Report

Independence Park, Kingston
Referee: Shavin Greene (Guyana)
20 August 2025
20:00

O&M (Dominican Republic)	2–0	(Trinidad and Tobago) Central
Manterola 69'; Gómez 83'	Report

Estadio Cibao, Santiago de los Caballeros
Referee: Ray Torres (Puerto Rico)

26 August 2025
18:00 (19:00 UTC−3)

Robinhood (Suriname)	2–2	(Trinidad and Tobago) Central
Santos 10'; Zijler 60'	Report	Lee 27'; Jones 37'

Dr. Ir. Franklin Essed Stadion, Paramaribo
Referee: Steffon Dewar (Jamaica)
27 August 2025
20:00

Moca (Dominican Republic)	0–2	(Jamaica) Mount Pleasant
	Report	Green 31', 60'

Estadio Moca 86, Moca
Referee: Edson Lieveld (Suriname)

16 September 2025
20:00

Central (Trinidad and Tobago)	2–0	(Dominican Republic) Moca
Neptune 39'; Charles 78'	Report

Hasely Crawford Stadium, Port of Spain
Referee: James Ramprashad (British Virgin Islands)
18 September 2025
18:00 (19:00 UTC−3)

Robinhood (Suriname)	1–3	(Dominican Republic) O&M
Esajas 25'	Report	Báez 1'; Herard 21', 90+4'

Dr. Ir. Franklin Essed Stadion, Paramaribo
Referee: Christopher Mason (Jamaica)

23 September 2025
20:00

Central (Trinidad and Tobago)	0–2	(Jamaica) Mount Pleasant
	Report	Edwards 51'; Walsh 90'

Hasely Crawford Stadium, Port of Spain
Referee: Sergio Rozenhaut (Suriname)
24 September 2025
20:00

O&M (Dominican Republic)	1–2	(Dominican Republic) Moca
Báez 33'	Report	Parra 31'; Azcona 56'

Estadio Cibao, Santiago de los Caballeros
Referee: Adrián Lage (Cuba)

30 September 2025
20:00

Moca (Dominican Republic)	0–2	(Suriname) Robinhood
	Report	Esajas 51'; Andro 74'

Estadio Moca 86, Moca
Referee: Okeito Nicholson (Jamaica)
30 September 2025
20:00 (19:00 UTC−5)

Mount Pleasant (Jamaica)	2–0	(Dominican Republic) O&M
Irving 36'; Biggs 63'	Report

Independence Park, Kingston
Referee: Ken Pennyfeather (Antigua and Barbuda)

=== Group B ===
Pos	Team	Pld	W	D	L	GF	GA	GD	Pts	Qualification	CIB	DEF	WEY	CAV	JDC
1	(Dominican Republic) Cibao	4	3	0	1	7	3	+4	9	Advance to semi-finals	—	0–2	—	2–0	—
2	(Trinidad and Tobago) Defence Force	4	2	1	1	5	3	+2	7	Advance to semi-finals	—	—	1–1	—	1–0
3	(Barbados) Weymouth Wales	4	2	1	1	6	5	+1	7		1–2	—	—	2–1	—
4	(Jamaica) Cavalier	4	1	1	2	4	6	−2	4		—	2–1	—	—	1–1
5	(Haiti) Juventus des Cayes	4	0	1	3	2	7	−5	1		0–3	—	1–2	—	—

Source: CONCACAF
19 August 2025
20:00

Cibao (Dominican Republic)	2–0	(Jamaica) Cavalier
De la Cruz 20'; Ventura 73'	Report

Estadio Cibao, Santiago de los Caballeros
Referee: Ricangel de Leça (Aruba)
21 August 2025
20:00

Defence Force (Trinidad and Tobago)	1–0	(Haiti) Juventus des Cayes
Molino 53'	Report

Hasely Crawford Stadium, Port of Spain
Referee: Reon Radix (Grenada)

26 August 2025
20:00

Weymouth Wales (Barbados)	1–2	(Dominican Republic) Cibao
Applewhaite 78'	Report	Correa 4', 17'

Wildey Turf, Wildey
Referee: Shekiel Byon Jokil (Suriname)
28 August 2025
20:00 (19:00 UTC−5)

Cavalier (Jamaica)	1–1	(Haiti) Juventus des Cayes
Watson 18'	Report	Seïde 77'

Sabina Park, Kingston
Referee: Hakeem Harvey (Saint Kitts and Nevis)

17 September 2025
20:00 (19:00 UTC−5)

Cavalier (Jamaica)	2–1	(Trinidad and Tobago) Defence Force
Massicot 21'; Ainsworth 82'	Report	Thomas 2'

Independence Park, Kingston
Referee: Norberto Da Silva Costa (Curaçao)
18 September 2025
20:00

Juventus des Cayes (Haiti)	1–2	(Barbados) Weymouth Wales
Dorante 26'	Report	Stewart 20', 42'

Estadio Cibao, Santiago de los Caballeros (Dominican Republic)
Referee: Andrew Samuel (Trinidad and Tobago)

23 September 2025
20:00

Juventus des Cayes (Haiti)	0–3	(Dominican Republic) Cibao
	Report	Peguero 14'; Correa 42'; Acuña 63'

Estadio Cibao, Santiago de los Caballeros (Dominican Republic)
Referee: Reginald Gumbs (Saint Kitts and Nevis)
25 September 2025
20:00

Defence Force (Trinidad and Tobago)	1–1	(Barbados) Weymouth Wales
Bertrand 45+1'	Report	Applewhaite 79'

Hasely Crawford Stadium, Port of Spain
Referee: Michael Akangou (Cayman Islands)

1 October 2025
20:00

Weymouth Wales (Barbados)	2–1	(Jamaica) Cavalier
Lashley 10'; Bynoe 90+3'	Report	Massicot 13'

Wildey Turf, Wildey
Referee: Khamal Vere Benjamin Harding-Hodge (Anguilla)
1 October 2025
20:00

Cibao (Dominican Republic)	0–2	(Trinidad and Tobago) Defence Force
	Report	Molino 2'; Keller 46'

Estadio Cibao, Santiago de los Caballeros
Referee: Kimbell Ward (Saint Kitts and Nevis)
