= 2024 CONCACAF Caribbean Cup group stage =

Annual edition of a club football competition

The 2024 CONCACAF Caribbean Cup group stage was played from 20 August to 3 October 2024. A total of 10 teams competed in the group stage to decide the 4 places in the knockout stage of the 2024 CONCACAF Caribbean Cup.

== Draw ==
The draw for the group stage was held on 6 June 2024 at 17:00 EDT (UTC−4) in Miami, Florida, United States. The 10 involved teams were previously seeded into five pots of two teams each based on their CONCACAF Club Ranking as of 3 June 2024, except for the teams in pot 5, which was reserved for the champions and runners-up of the 2024 CFU Club Shield.

Pot	Team	Rank	Pts
1	(Dominican Republic) Cibao	91	1,050
1	(Jamaica) Mount Pleasant	92	1,048
2	(Jamaica) Cavalier	100	1,041
2	(Dominican Republic) Moca	111	1,023
3	(Haiti) Real Hope	123	1,007
3	(Haiti) Ouanaminthe	129	1,001
4	(Trinidad and Tobago) Police F.C.	138	986
4	(Trinidad and Tobago) Port of Spain	151	969
5	(Jamaica) Arnett Gardens	—	
5	(Antigua and Barbuda) Grenades	—	

For the group stage, the 10 teams were drawn into two groups (Groups A and B) of five containing a team from each of the five pots. Teams from pot 1 were drawn first and were placed in the first position of their group, starting with Group A and then Group B. The same procedure was followed for teams from pots 2, 3, 4 and 5, and they were placed in positions 2, 3, 4 and 5, respectively, within the group to which they were drawn. No restrictions were applied at the time of drawing the groups.

The draw resulted in the following groups:

Group A
Pos	Team
A1	(Jamaica) Mount Pleasant
A2	(Jamaica) Cavalier
A3	(Haiti) Real Hope
A4	(Trinidad and Tobago) Police F.C.
A5	(Jamaica) Arnett Gardens

Group B
Pos	Team
B1	(Dominican Republic) Cibao
B2	(Dominican Republic) Moca
B3	(Haiti) Ouanaminthe
B4	(Trinidad and Tobago) Port of Spain
B5	(Antigua and Barbuda) Grenades

Notes

1. ^{CCS} The identity of the champions (Arnett Gardens) and runners-up (Grenades) of the 2024 CFU Club Shield was not known at the time of the draw.

== Format ==
In the group stage, each group was played on a single home-and-away round-robin basis, with teams playing against each other once, for a total of four matches per team (two home and two away). The teams were ranked according to the following criteria (Regulations Article 12.8.1).:

1. Points (3 points for a win, 1 point for a draw, and 0 points for a loss);
2. Goal difference;
3. Goals scored;
4. If two or more teams are still tied after applying the above criteria, their rankings would be determined as follows:
  1. Points in the matches played among the tied teams;
  2. Goal difference in the matches played among the tied teams (if more than two teams are equal on points);
  3. Goals scored in the matches played among the tied teams (if more than two teams are equal on points);
  4. The lowest number of disciplinary points, based on the following criteria:
    1. Yellow card: plus 1 point;
    2. Second yellow card/indirect red card: plus 3 points;
    3. Direct red card: plus 4 points;
    4. Yellow card and direct red card: plus 5 points;
5. Highest CONCACAF Club Ranking position (once all group stage matches were completed).
6. Drawing of lots by CONCACAF.

The winners and runners-up of each group advanced to the semi-finals of the knockout stage.

== Groups ==
All match times are in EDT (UTC−4) and local times, if different, are in parentheses as listed by CONCACAF.

=== Group A ===
Pos	Team	Pld	W	D	L	GF	GA	GD	Pts	Qualification	CAV	RHP	POL	MTP	ARN
1	(Jamaica) Cavalier	4	3	0	1	11	4	+7	9	Advance to semi-finals	—	1–2	4–1	—	—
2	(Haiti) Real Hope	4	2	2	0	5	2	+3	8	Advance to semi-finals	—	—	1–1	—	0–0
3	(Trinidad and Tobago) Police	4	1	2	1	4	6	−2	5		—	—	—	0–0	2–1
4	(Jamaica) Mount Pleasant	4	1	1	2	2	5	−3	4		0–2	0–2	—	—	—
5	(Jamaica) Arnett Gardens	4	0	1	3	3	8	−5	1		1–4	—	—	1–2	—

Source: CONCACAF
20 August 2024
18:00 (17:00 UTC−5)

Mount Pleasant (Jamaica)	0–2	(Jamaica) Cavalier
	Report	Ainsworth 9' (pen.); Stein 25'

Sabina Park, Kingston
Referee: Shavin Greene (Guyana)
22 August 2024
20:00 (19:00 UTC−5)

Real Hope (Haiti)	1–1	(Trinidad and Tobago) Police
Exilus 35'	Report	Kwesi 87'

Sabina Park, Kingston, (Jamaica) (Note: Real Hope played their home matches at Sabina Park, Kingston (Jamaica) instead of their regular stadium Parc Saint-Victor, Cap-Haïtien due to the ongoing civil unrest and violence in Haiti.)
Referee: Adonis Carrasco (Dominican Republic)

27 August 2024
18:00 (17:00 UTC−5)

Arnett Gardens (Jamaica)	1–2	(Jamaica) Mount Pleasant
Smith 54'	Report	Anglin 33'; Bailey 81'

Sabina Park, Kingston
Referee: Sergio Rozenhout (Suriname)
29 August 2024
20:00 (19:00 UTC−5)

Cavalier (Jamaica)	4–1	(Trinidad and Tobago) Police
Stein 22', 65'; Atkinson 77', 90+2'	Report	Woodley 32'

Sabina Park, Kingston
Referee: Alyssa Nichols (United States)

17 September 2024
20:00 (19:00 UTC−5)

Cavalier (Jamaica)	1–2	(Haiti) Real Hope
Atkinson 4'	Report	Chery 60'; Mondestin 66' (pen.)

Independence Park, Kingston
Referee: Hakeem Harvey (Saint Kitts and Nevis)
19 September 2024
20:00

Police (Trinidad and Tobago)	2–1	(Jamaica) Arnett Gardens
J. Jones 47'; Kesar 84'	Report	Brown 49'

Hasely Crawford Stadium, Port of Spain (Note: Police played their home matches at Hasely Crawford Stadium, Port of Spain (originally scheduled at Ato Boldon Stadium, Couva) instead of their regular stadium Manny Ramjohn, Saint James which did not meet CONCACAF requirements. The Hasely Crawford Stadium was under renovation from July to December 2024 but was opened for two weeks in September to host Police matches.)
Referee: Randy Encarnación (Dominican Republic)

25 September 2024
20:00 (19:00 UTC−5)

Real Hope (Haiti)	0–0	(Jamaica) Arnett Gardens
	Report

Independence Park, Kingston, (Jamaica)
Referee: Shekiel Jokil (Suriname)
26 September 2024
18:00

Police (Trinidad and Tobago)	0–0	(Jamaica) Mount Pleasant
	Report

Hasely Crawford Stadium, Port of Spain
Referee: Norberto da Silva (Curaçao)

3 October 2024
20:00 (19:00 UTC−5)

Arnett Gardens (Jamaica)	1–4	(Jamaica) Cavalier
Smith 9'	Report	Stein 29'; Calvin 35', 71'; Atkinson 59'

Independence Park, Kingston
Referee: José Torres (Puerto Rico)
3 October 2024
20:00 (19:00 UTC−5)

Mount Pleasant (Jamaica)	0–2	(Haiti) Real Hope
	Report	Exilus 12', 77'

Sabina Park, Kingston
Referee: José Corporán (Dominican Republic)

=== Group B ===
Pos	Team	Pld	W	D	L	GF	GA	GD	Pts	Qualification	CIB	MOC	POS	GRE	OUA
1	(Dominican Republic) Cibao	4	3	1	0	9	4	+5	10	Advance to semi-finals	—	0–0	—	—	4–1
2	(Dominican Republic) Moca	4	3	1	0	8	4	+4	10	Advance to semi-finals	—	—	3–2	—	3–1
3	(Trinidad and Tobago) Port of Spain	4	0	2	2	6	8	−2	2		2–3	—	—	1–1	—
4	(Antigua and Barbuda) Grenades	4	0	2	2	5	7	−2	2		1–2	1–2	—	—	—
5	(Haiti) Ouanaminthe	4	0	2	2	5	10	−5	2		—	—	1–1	2–2	—

Source: CONCACAF
21 August 2024
18:00

Cibao (Dominican Republic)	0–0	(Dominican Republic) Moca
	Report

Estadio Cibao FC, Santiago de los Caballeros
Referee: Reon Radix (Grenada)
22 August 2024
18:00

Ouanaminthe (Haiti)	1–1	(Trinidad and Tobago) Port of Spain
Willinx 52'	Report	Henry 34'

Estadio Moca 86, Moca, (Dominican Republic) (Note: Ouanaminthe played their home matches at Estadio Moca 86, Moca (Dominican Republic) instead of their regular stadium Parc Notre-Dame, Ouanaminthe due to the ongoing civil unrest and violence in Haiti.)
Referee: Moeth Gaymes (Saint Vincent and the Grenadines)

27 August 2024
20:00

Moca (Dominican Republic)	3–2	(Trinidad and Tobago) Port of Spain
Aciar 51'; Ascona 62'; Thomas 90+1'	Report	Rochford 41', 49'

Estadio Moca 86, Moca
Referee: Odette Hamilton (Jamaica)
28 August 2024
20:00

Grenades (Antigua and Barbuda)	1–2	(Dominican Republic) Cibao
Augustin 52'	Report	López 27'; Rodríguez 72'

Estadio Cibao FC, Santiago de los Caballeros, (Dominican Republic) (Note: Grenades played their home matches against Cibao at Estadio Cibao FC, Santiago de los Caballeros and against Moca at Estadio Moca 86, Moca (both in Dominican Republic) instead of their regular stadium Antigua Recreation Ground, St John's which did not meet CONCACAF requirements.)
Referee: Sanchez Bass (Saint Kitts and Nevis)

17 September 2024
18:00

Port of Spain (Trinidad and Tobago)	1–1	(Antigua and Barbuda) Grenades
Henry 21'	Report	Tomlinson 90+5'

Hasely Crawford Stadium, Port of Spain (Note: Port of Spain played their home matches (originally scheduled at Ato Boldon Stadium, Couva) at their regular stadium Hasely Crawford, Port of Spain after it was made available for two weeks in September to host the matches in the midst of the renovation works that took place from July to December 2024.)
Referee: Tristley Bassue (Saint Kitts and Nevis)
18 September 2024
20:00

Moca (Dominican Republic)	3–1	(Haiti) Ouanaminthe
Yambatis 21'; Ascona 65' (pen.); Sánchez 86'	Report	Philistin 27'

Estadio Moca 86, Moca
Referee: Ken Pennyfeather (Antigua and Barbuda)

24 September 2024
18:00

Ouanaminthe (Haiti)	2–2	(Antigua and Barbuda) Grenades
Willinx 45' (pen.), 69' (pen.)	Report	Q. Griffith 20'; Stewart 89'

Estadio Moca 86, Moca, (Dominican Republic)
Referee: Christopher Mason (Jamaica)
24 September 2024
20:00

Port of Spain (Trinidad and Tobago)	2–3	(Dominican Republic) Cibao
Henry 38'; Neptune 40'	Report	López 63'; Correa 75', 89'

Hasely Crawford Stadium, Port of Spain
Referee: Okeito Nicholson (Jamaica)

1 October 2024
20:00

Grenades (Antigua and Barbuda)	1–2	(Dominican Republic) Moca
Griffith 50'	Report	Ascona 53'; De Peña 61'

Estadio Moca 86, Moca, (Dominican Republic)
Referee: Timothy Derry (Trinidad and Tobago)
1 October 2024
20:00

Cibao (Dominican Republic)	4–1	(Haiti) Ouanaminthe
Rodríguez 33'; Heredia 37'; Correa 48'; Quezada 78'	Report	Altidor 55'

Estadio Cibao FC, Santiago de los Caballeros
Referee: Kimbell Ward (Saint Kitts and Nevis)
