= 2025 CONCACAF Caribbean Cup =

Association football tournament

Tournament details
- Dates: 19 August – 2 December
- Teams: 10 (from 6 associations)

Final positions
- Champions: (Jamaica) Mount Pleasant (1st title)
- Runners-up: (Dominican Republic) O&M
- Third place: (Trinidad and Tobago) Defence Force
- Fourth place: (Dominican Republic) Cibao

Tournament statistics
- Matches played: 26
- Goals scored: 62 (2.38 per match)
- Top scorer: (Haiti) Frantzety Herard (5 goals)
- Best player: (Jamaica) Daniel Green
- Best young player: (Dominican Republic) Edwarlyn Reyes
- Best goalkeeper: (Jamaica) Tafari Chambers
- Fair play award: (Dominican Republic) O&M

The 2025 CONCACAF Caribbean Cup was the third edition of the CONCACAF Caribbean Cup, the first-tier annual international club football competition in the Caribbean region.

Mount Pleasant won the title and qualified to the 2026 CONCACAF Champions Cup round of 16, while runners-up O&M and third place Defence Force both qualified to round one.

== Teams ==
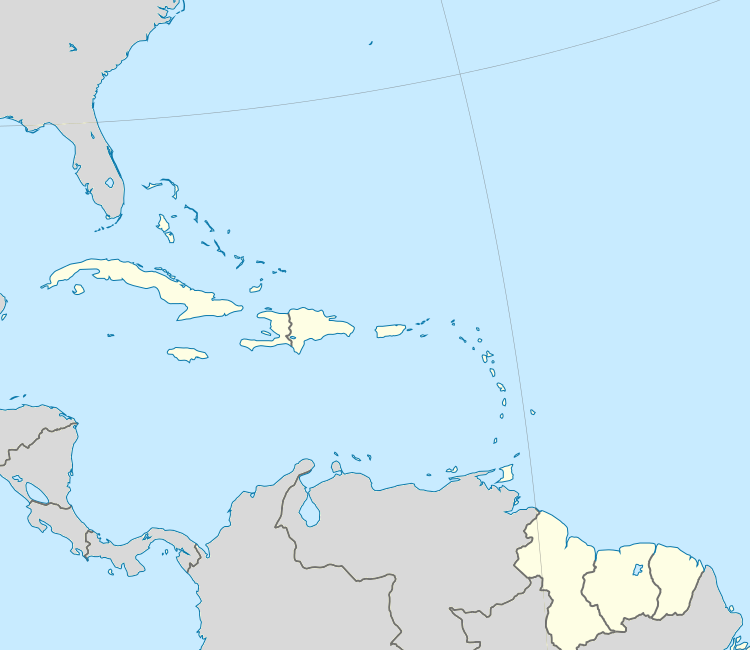
Location of teams of the 2025 CONCACAF Caribbean Cup

Ten teams from six CFU member associations qualified for the tournament. Eight teams from five nations qualified based on results from their domestic leagues, with Suriname receiving a direct slot for the first time at the expense of Haiti, which went from having two slots to one. The remaining two teams qualified from the 2025 CFU Club Shield.

The entry berths were as follows:

- CFU Club Shield: 2 berths (champions and runners-up)
- Dominican Republic, Jamaica, Trinidad and Tobago: 2 berths
- Haiti, Suriname: 1 berth

Association	Team	Qualification method
Barbados (0+1 berths)	Weymouth Wales	2025 CFU Club Shield runners-up
Dominican Republic (2+1 berths)	Cibao	2024 Liga Dominicana de Fútbol champions
Dominican Republic (2+1 berths)	O&M	2024 Liga Dominicana de Fútbol runners-up
Dominican Republic (2+1 berths)	Moca	2025 CFU Club Shield champions
Jamaica (2 berths)	Cavalier	2024–25 Jamaica Premier League champions
Jamaica (2 berths)	Mount Pleasant	2024–25 Jamaica Premier League runners-up
Haiti (1 berth)	Juventus des Cayes	2025 D1 Special Championship champions
Suriname (1 berth)	Robinhood	2024 Suriname Major League champions
Trinidad and Tobago (2 berths)	Defence Force	2024–25 TT Premier Football League champions
Trinidad and Tobago (2 berths)	Central	2024–25 TT Premier Football League runners-up

== Schedule ==
The schedule of the competition was as follows.

Stage	Round	First leg	Second leg
Group stage	Matchday 1	19–21 August	
Group stage	Matchday 2	26–28 August	
Group stage	Matchday 3	16–18 September	
Group stage	Matchday 4	23–25 September	
Group stage	Matchday 5	30 September – 1 October	
Knockout stage	Semi-finals	22–30 October	5–6 November
Knockout stage	Final and third place play-off	25 November	2 December

== Group stage ==
In the group stage, each group was played on a home-and-away basis, where each club played every other club in their group once, two matches at home and two matches away.

The top two teams in each group advanced to the knockout stage.

=== Group A ===
Pos	Team	Pld	W	D	L	GF	GA	GD	Pts	Qualification	MTP	O&M	ROB	CEN	MOC
1	(Jamaica) Mount Pleasant	4	4	0	0	7	0	+7	12	Advance to semi-finals	—	2–0	1–0	—	—
2	(Dominican Republic) O&M	4	2	0	2	6	5	+1	6	Advance to semi-finals	—	—	—	2–0	1–2
3	(Suriname) Robinhood	4	1	1	2	5	6	−1	4		—	1–3	—	2–2	—
4	(Trinidad and Tobago) Central	4	1	1	2	4	6	−2	4		0–2	—	—	—	2–0
5	(Dominican Republic) Moca	4	1	0	3	2	7	−5	3		0–2	—	0–2	—	—

Source: CONCACAF
Rules for classification: 1) Points; 2) Goal difference; 3) Goals scored; 4) Head-to-head results (points, goal difference, goals scored); 5) Disciplinary points; 6) Drawing of lots.

=== Group B ===
Pos	Team	Pld	W	D	L	GF	GA	GD	Pts	Qualification	CIB	DEF	WEY	CAV	JDC
1	(Dominican Republic) Cibao	4	3	0	1	7	3	+4	9	Advance to semi-finals	—	0–2	—	2–0	—
2	(Trinidad and Tobago) Defence Force	4	2	1	1	5	3	+2	7	Advance to semi-finals	—	—	1–1	—	1–0
3	(Barbados) Weymouth Wales	4	2	1	1	6	5	+1	7		1–2	—	—	2–1	—
4	(Jamaica) Cavalier	4	1	1	2	4	6	−2	4		—	2–1	—	—	1–1
5	(Haiti) Juventus des Cayes	4	0	1	3	2	7	−5	1		0–3	—	1–2	—	—

Source: CONCACAF
Rules for classification: 1) Points; 2) Goal difference; 3) Goals scored; 4) Head-to-head results (points, goal difference, goals scored); 5) Disciplinary points; 6) Drawing of lots.

== Knockout stage ==
The knockout stage was played on a single-elimination tournament with the following rules:

- Each tie was played on a home-and-away two-legged basis. The home team of the second leg in each tie was determined separately for each round as follows (Regulations Article 12.9):
  - In the semi-finals, the group winners hosted the second leg.
  - In the final, the higher-ranked team based on total points accumulated in the group stage and semi-finals hosted the second leg.
- In the semi-finals, if tied on aggregate, the away goals rule was used. If still tied, the winners were determined by a penalty shoot-out.
- In the third place play-off and final, if tied on aggregate, the away goals rule was also used. If still tied, 30 minutes of extra time were played (without an away goals criteria). If still tied after extra time, the winner was determined by a penalty shoot-out.

=== Qualified teams ===
The winners and runners-up of each of the four groups in the group stage advanced to the semi-finals.

Group	Winners	Runners-up
A	(Jamaica) Mount Pleasant	(Dominican Republic) O&M
B	(Dominican Republic) Cibao	(Trinidad and Tobago) Defence Force

=== Bracket ===
The bracket was pre-determined.

Semi-finals
(Trinidad and Tobago) Defence Force	1	1	2
(Jamaica) Mount Pleasant	5	0	5
(Dominican Republic) O&M	1	1	2
(Dominican Republic) Cibao	1	0	1

Final
(Jamaica) Mount Plesant	1	2	3
(Dominican Republic) O&M	0	2	2
Third place
(Trinidad and Tobago) Defence Force	3	1	4
(Dominican Republic) Cibao	0	2	2

=== Semi-finals ===
The first legs were played on 21 and 30 October, and the second legs were played on 5 and 6 November 2025. Both winners qualified for the 2026 CONCACAF Champions Cup.

Team 1	Agg.	Team 2	1st leg	2nd leg
Defence Force (Trinidad and Tobago)	2–5	(Jamaica) Mount Pleasant	1–5	1–0
O&M (Dominican Republic)	2–1	(Dominican Republic) Cibao	1–1	1–0

22 October 2025
17:00 (18:00 UTC−4)

Defence Force (Trinidad and Tobago)	1–5	(Jamaica) Mount Pleasant
Thomas 90+7'	Report	Brown 5'; Edwards 15', 57'; Bradford 84'; Bailey 90+3'

Hasely Crawford Stadium, Port of Spain
Referee: Adonis Carrasco (Dominican Republic)
5 November 2025
18:00 (19:00 UTC−5)

Mount Pleasant (Jamaica)	0–1	(Trinidad and Tobago) Defence Force
	Report	Molino 13'

Independence Park, Kingston
Referee: Ken Pennyfeather (Antigua and Barbuda)

Mount Pleasant won 5–2 on aggregate.

30 October 2025
17:00 (18:00 UTC−4)

O&M (Dominican Republic)	1–1	(Dominican Republic) Cibao
Herard 25' (pen.)	Report	Trinidad 7'

Estadio Olímpico Félix Sánchez, Santo Domingo
Referee: Andrew Samuel (Trinidad and Tobago)
6 November 2025
18:00 (19:00 UTC−4)

Cibao (Dominican Republic)	0–1	(Dominican Republic) O&M
	Report	Herard 67'

Estadio Cibao FC, Santiago de los Caballeros
Referee: Reginald Gumbs (Saint Kitts and Nevis)

O&M won 2–1 on aggregate.

=== Third place play-off ===
The winner qualified for the 2026 CONCACAF Champions Cup.

Team 1	Agg.	Team 2	1st leg	2nd leg
Defence Force (Trinidad and Tobago)	4–2	(Dominican Republic) Cibao	3–0	1–2

25 November 2025
16:00
(17:00 UTC−4)

Defence Force (Trinidad and Tobago)	3–0	(Dominican Republic) Cibao
Bateau 3'; Molino 42' (pen.); St. Hillaire 85'	Report

Hasely Crawford Stadium, Port of Spain
Referee: Edson Lieveld (Suriname)
2 December 2025
16:00
(17:00 UTC−4)

Cibao (Dominican Republic)	2–1	(Trinidad and Tobago) Defence Force
Correa 45+6'; Peralta 45+8'	Report	Ollivierra 90+4'

Estadio Cibao FC, Santiago de los Caballeros
Referee: Steffon Dewar (Jamaica)

Defense Force won 4–2 on aggregate.

=== Final ===
The winner qualified for the round of 16 of the 2026 CONCACAF Champions Cup.

Team 1	Agg.	Team 2	1st leg	2nd leg
O&M (Dominican Republic)	2–3	(Jamaica) Mount Pleasant	0–1	2–2

25 November 2025
19:06
(20:06 UTC−4)

O&M (Dominican Republic)	0–1	(Jamaica) Mount Pleasant
	Report	Bailey 8'

Estadio Cibao FC, Santiago de los Caballeros
Referee: Ricangel de Leça (Aruba)
2 December 2025
19:00
(20:00 UTC−4)

Mount Pleasant (Jamaica)	2–2	(Dominican Republic) O&M
Brown 62'; Magee 87'	Report	Herard 45+5'; Olasagasti 69'

National Stadium, Kingston
Referee: José Torres (Puerto Rico)

Mount Pleasant won 3–2 on aggregate.

== Statistics ==
=== Top goalscorers ===
Rank	Player	Team	Goals
1	(Haiti) Frantzety Herard	(Dominican Republic) O&M	5
2	(Colombia) Rivaldo Correa	(Dominican Republic) Cibao	4
2	(Trinidad and Tobago) Kevin Molino	(Trinidad and Tobago) Defence Force	4
4	(Jamaica) Raheem Edwards	(Jamaica) Mount Pleasant	3
5	(Dominican Republic) Isaac Báez	(Dominican Republic) O&M	2
5	(Jamaica) Kimoni Bailey	(Jamaica) Mount Pleasant	2
5	(Jamaica) Warner Brown	(Jamaica) Mount Pleasant	2
5	(Suriname) Murgillio Esajas	(Suriname) Robinhood	2
5	(Jamaica) Daniel Green	(Jamaica) Mount Pleasant	2
5	(Antigua and Barbuda) Daryl Massicot	(Jamaica) Cavalier	2
5	(Barbados) Shaquille Stewart	(Barbados) Weymouth Wales	2
5	(Trinidad and Tobago) Kaihim Thomas	(Trinidad and Tobago) Defence Force	2

=== Best XI ===
CONCACAF selected the following players as the team of the tournament.

Pos.	Player	Team
GK	(Jamaica) Tafari Chambers	(Jamaica Football Federation) Mount Pleasant
DF	(Dominican Republic) Edwarlyn Reyes	(Dominican Football Federation) Cibao
DF	(Jamaica) Jamoi Topey	(Jamaica Football Federation) Mount Pleasant
DF	(Spain) Julen Olasagasti	(Dominican Football Federation) O&M
DF	(Dominican Republic) Yoan Melo	(Dominican Football Federation) O&M
MF	(Spain) Jon Trincado	(Dominican Football Federation) O&M
MF	(Jamaica) Jahshaun Anglin	(Jamaica Football Federation) Mount Pleasant
MF	(Trinidad and Tobago) Kevin Molino	(Trinidad and Tobago Football Association) Defence Force
FW	(Jamaica) Daniel Green	(Jamaica Football Federation) Mount Pleasant
FW	(Colombia) Rivaldo Correa	(Dominican Football Federation) Cibao
FW	(Haiti) Frantzety Herard	(Dominican Football Federation) O&M

=== Awards ===
Award	Player	Team	Ref.
Best Player Award	(Jamaica) Daniel Green	(Jamaica Football Federation) Mount Pleasant	
Best Goalkeeper Award	(Jamaica) Tafari Chambers	(Jamaica Football Federation) Mount Pleasant	
Young Player Award	(Dominican Republic) Edwarlyn Reyes	(Dominican Football Federation) Cibao	
Top Scorer Award	(Haiti) Frantzety Herard	(Dominican Football Federation) O&M	
Fair Play Award	—N/a	(Dominican Football Federation) O&M	

== See also ==
- 2025 CONCACAF Champions Cup
- 2025 Leagues Cup
- 2025 CONCACAF Central American Cup
