= Rudolph Speid =

Jamaican football manager (born 1962)

Personal information
- Date of birth: 22 February 1962
- Place of birth: Jamaica

Managerial career
- Years: Team
- 2016–2025: Cavalier
- 2025–: Jamaica

Rudolph Speid (born 22 February 1962) is a Jamaican professional football coach.

== Early life ==
Speid worked as an accountant and treasurer.

== Playing Career ==
Speid played in the domestic Business House and amateur leagues in Jamaica while coaching youth and club football.

== Management/Coaching Career ==
Speid headed the Kingston & St Andrew Football Association from 1996 to 2000 and again from 2004 to 2008. He later worked as technical director of Jamaican side Cavalier.

In December 2024, Speid coached Cavalier to the 2024 Caribbean Club Championship.

On 21 November 2025, Speid was appointed as interim coach of Jamaican national team for the 2026 World Cup qualification inter-confederation play-offs.

On 31 March 2026, Speid left as the interim coach of Jamaican national team.

== Personal life ==
Speid obtained a CONCACAF A Coaching License.

== Honors ==
As Head Coach:

=== Domestic ===
- Jamaica Premier League:
  - Champions (3): 2021, 2023–24, 2024–25
  - Runners-up (1):2022–23

=== International ===
- CONCACAF Caribbean Cup
  - Champions (1): 2024
  - Runners-up (1): 2023

=== Doubles ===
- League & Caribbean Cup: 2024
