= Vino Barclett =

Saint-Lucian football player

Personal information
- Full name: Vino Shervin Barclett
- Date of birth: 12 October 1999 (age 27)
- Place of birth: Vieux Fort, Saint Lucia
- Height: 1.80 m (5 ft 11 in)
- Position: Goalkeeper

Team information
- Current team: Cavalier
- Number: 1

Senior career*
Years	Team	Apps	(Gls)
2022–	Cavalier	81	(0)

International career^{‡}
2018	Saint Lucia U20	4	(0)
2018–	Saint Lucia	39	(0)
- * Club domestic league appearances and goals as of 20 March 2026 ‡ National team caps and goals as of 24 March 2026

Vino Shervin Barclett (born 12 October 1999) is a Saint Lucian professional footballer who plays as a goalkeeper for Jamaica Premier League club Cavalier and the Saint Lucia national team.

== Club career ==
Barclett was signed by Cavalier F.C. ahead of the 2022 season as a replacement goalkeeper for Jeadine White who left Cavalier in order to begin pre-season training with Phoenix Rising FC of the USL Championship. Barclett said he had to adapt his style of play to suit Cavalier, to come for more crosses, and improve his ball playing abilities. Such was Barclett’s early season form for Cavalier he received Man of the Match awards in consecutive games in February 2022 and he was nicknamed “The Wall” by sections of the local press. Barclett saved penalties from Donovan Segree and Daniel Green as Cavalier defeated Mount Pleasant 4–3 on spot-kicks in the quarter-final of the 2022 National Premier League play-offs. However, after a 4–4 draw on aggregate in the semi-final against Dunbeholden F.C. Barclett was unable to prevent a 4–2 penalty shoot-out defeat for his side in July 2022.

He saved two penalties as Cavalier won the Jamaican Premier League final in May 2024 on a penalty shoot-out against Mount Pleasant.

== International career ==
Barclett was playing in goal for the Saint Lucia national football team in June 2022 as they secured promotion from League C of the 2022–23 CONCACAF Nations League. This came following back to back victories under the management of Stern John. First, a 1–0 away win over Dominica at Windsor Park, which included a fingertip save in the 59th minute from Barclett from a free kick from Anfernee Frederick. Second, a 2–0 home win against Anguilla at the Darren Sammy Cricket Ground.

== Honours ==
Cavalier

- Jamaica Premier League: 2023–24, runner-up 2022–23
- JFF Champions Cup runner-up: 2023
- CONCACAF Caribbean Cup: 2024, runner-up 2023

Individual

- CONCACAF Caribbean Cup Semifinal Best XI: 2023
- CONCACAF Caribbean Cup Best Goalkeeper: 2024
- CONCACAF Caribbean Cup Best XI: 2024
