= 2024 CONCACAF Caribbean Cup =

Association football tournament

Tournament details
- Dates: 20 August – 3 December
- Teams: 10 (from 5 associations)

Final positions
- Champions: (Jamaica) Cavalier (1st title)
- Runners-up: (Dominican Republic) Cibao
- Third place: (Haiti) Real Hope
- Fourth place: (Dominican Republic) Moca

Tournament statistics
- Matches played: 28
- Goals scored: 81 (2.89 per match)
- Top scorer(s): (Suriname) Shaquille Stein (8 goals)
- Best player: (Jamaica) Dwayne Atkinson
- Best young player: (Antigua and Barbuda) Jalmaro Calvin
- Best goalkeeper: (Saint Lucia) Vino Barclett
- Fair play award: (Jamaica) Cavalier

The 2024 CONCACAF Caribbean Cup was the second edition of the CONCACAF Caribbean Cup, the first-tier annual international club football competition in the Caribbean region. It was contested by clubs whose football associations are affiliated with the Caribbean Football Union (CFU), a sub-confederation of CONCACAF.

The winners of the 2024 CONCACAF Caribbean Cup qualified to the 2025 CONCACAF Champions Cup Round of 16, and the second and third place teams qualified to Round One.

== Teams ==
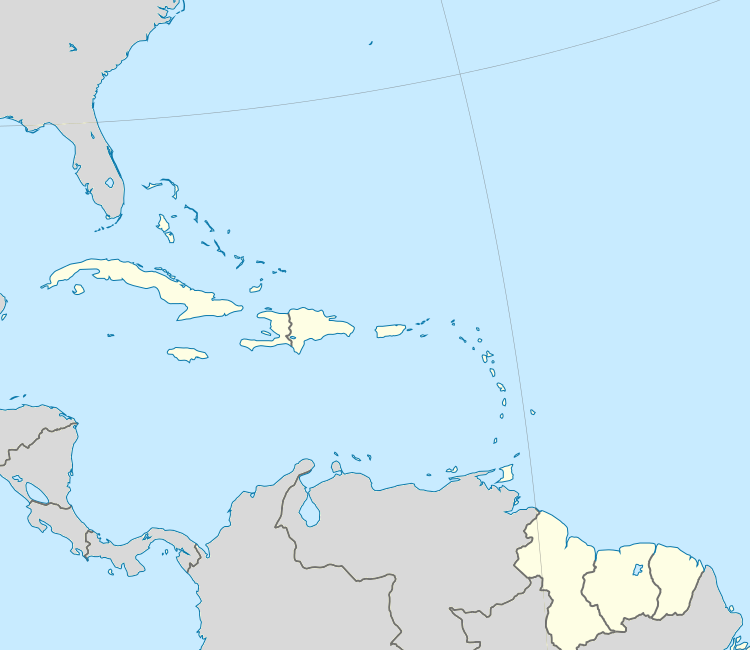
Location of teams of the 2024 CONCACAF Caribbean Cup

Ten teams from five CFU member associations qualified for the tournament. Eight teams from four nations qualified based on results from their domestic leagues and the remaining two teams qualified from the 2024 CFU Club Shield.

The entry berths were as follows:

- CFU Club Shield: 2 berths (champions and runners-up)
- Dominican Republic, Jamaica, Haiti, and Trinidad and Tobago: 2 berths

| Association | Team | Qualification method |
|---|---|---|
| Antigua and Barbuda (0+1 berth) | Grenades | 2024 CFU Club Shield runners-up |
| Dominican Republic (2 berths) | Cibao | 2023 Liga Dominicana de Fútbol champions |
| Dominican Republic (2 berths) | Moca | 2023 Liga Dominicana de Fútbol runners-up |
| Jamaica (2+1 berths) | Cavalier | 2023–24 Jamaica Premier League champions |
| Jamaica (2+1 berths) | Mount Pleasant | 2023–24 Jamaica Premier League runners-up |
| Jamaica (2+1 berths) | Arnett Gardens | 2024 CFU Club Shield champions |
| Haiti (2 berths) | Real Hope | 2024 D1 Special Championship champions |
| Haiti (2 berths) | Ouanaminthe | 2024 D1 Special Championship runners-up |
| Trinidad and Tobago (2 berths) | Port of Spain | 2023–24 TT Premier Football League champions |
| Trinidad and Tobago (2 berths) | Police | 2023–24 TT Premier Football League runners-up |

== Schedule ==
The schedule of the competition was as follows.

| Stage | Round | First leg | Second leg |
|---|---|---|---|
| Group stage | Matchday 1 | 20–22 August | |
| Group stage | Matchday 2 | 27–29 August | |
| Group stage | Matchday 3 | 17–19 September | |
| Group stage | Matchday 4 | 24–26 September | |
| Group stage | Matchday 5 | 1–3 October | |
| Knockout | Semifinals | 23–24 October | 30–31 October |
| Knockout | Finals and 3rd place | 26 November | 3 December |

== Group stage ==
In the group stage, each group was played on a home-and-away basis, where each club played every other club in their group once, two matches at home and two matches away.

The first and second-place finishers advanced to the knockout stage.

=== Group A ===
| Pos | Team | Pld | W | D | L | GF | GA | GD | Pts | Qualification | CAV | RHP | POL | MTP | ARN |
|---|---|---|---|---|---|---|---|---|---|---|---|---|---|---|---|
| 1 | (Jamaica) Cavalier | 4 | 3 | 0 | 1 | 11 | 4 | +7 | 9 | Advance to semi-finals | — | 1–2 | 4–1 | — | — |
| 2 | (Haiti) Real Hope | 4 | 2 | 2 | 0 | 5 | 2 | +3 | 8 | Advance to semi-finals | — | — | 1–1 | — | 0–0 |
| 3 | (Trinidad and Tobago) Police | 4 | 1 | 2 | 1 | 4 | 6 | −2 | 5 | | — | — | — | 0–0 | 2–1 |
| 4 | (Jamaica) Mount Pleasant | 4 | 1 | 1 | 2 | 2 | 5 | −3 | 4 | | 0–2 | 0–2 | — | — | — |
| 5 | (Jamaica) Arnett Gardens | 4 | 0 | 1 | 3 | 3 | 8 | −5 | 1 | | 1–4 | — | — | 1–2 | — |

Source: CONCACAF
Rules for classification: 1) Points; 2) Goal difference; 3) Goals scored; 4) Head-to-head results (points, goal difference, goals scored); 5) Disciplinary points; 6) Drawing of lots.

=== Group B ===
| Pos | Team | Pld | W | D | L | GF | GA | GD | Pts | Qualification | CIB | MOC | POS | GRE | OUA |
|---|---|---|---|---|---|---|---|---|---|---|---|---|---|---|---|
| 1 | (Dominican Republic) Cibao | 4 | 3 | 1 | 0 | 9 | 4 | +5 | 10 | Advance to semi-finals | — | 0–0 | — | — | 4–1 |
| 2 | (Dominican Republic) Moca | 4 | 3 | 1 | 0 | 8 | 4 | +4 | 10 | Advance to semi-finals | — | — | 3–2 | — | 3–1 |
| 3 | (Trinidad and Tobago) Port of Spain | 4 | 0 | 2 | 2 | 6 | 8 | −2 | 2 | | 2–3 | — | — | 1–1 | — |
| 4 | (Antigua and Barbuda) Grenades | 4 | 0 | 2 | 2 | 5 | 7 | −2 | 2 | | 1–2 | 1–2 | — | — | — |
| 5 | (Haiti) Ouanaminthe | 4 | 0 | 2 | 2 | 5 | 10 | −5 | 2 | | — | — | 1–1 | 2–2 | — |

Source: CONCACAF
Rules for classification: 1) Points; 2) Goal difference; 3) Goals scored; 4) Head-to-head results (points, goal difference, goals scored); 5) Disciplinary points; 6) Drawing of lots.

== Knockout stage ==
The knockout stage was played on a single-elimination tournament with the following rules:

- Each tie was played on a home-and-away two-legged basis. The home team of the second leg in each tie was determined separately for each round as follows (Regulations Article 12.9):
  - In the semi-finals, the group winners hosted the second leg.
  - In the finals, the higher-ranked team based on total points accumulated in the group stage and semi-finals hosted the second leg.
- In the semi-finals, if tied on aggregate, the away goals rule would be used. If still tied, the penalty shoot-out would be directly used to determine the winners (Regulations Article 12.8.2).
- In the third place play-offs and finals, if tied on aggregate, the away goals rule would also be used. If still tied, 30 minutes of extra time would be played but the away goals scored during this time would not serve as a tie-breaking criteria. If still tied after extra time, the penalty shoot-out would be used to determine the winner (Regulations Article 12.8.3).

=== Qualified teams ===
The winners and runners-up of each of the four groups in the group stage advanced to the quarter-finals.

| Group | Winners | Runners-up |
|---|---|---|
| A | (Jamaica) Cavalier | (Haiti) Real Hope |
| B | (Dominican Republic) Cibao | (Dominican Republic) Moca |

=== Bracket ===
The bracket was pre-determined as follows.

Semi-finals
(Haiti) Real Hope | 2 | 0 | 2
(Dominican Republic) Cibao | 3 | 1 | 4
(Dominican Republic) Moca | 0 | 0 | 0
(Jamaica) Cavalier | 0 | 7 | 7

Finals
(Jamaica) Cavalier (a) | 1 | 1 | 2
(Dominican Republic) Cibao | 0 | 2 | 2
Third place
(Haiti) Real Hope | 1 | 3 | 4
(Dominican Republic) Moca | 0 | 2 | 2

=== Semi-finals ===
The first legs were played on 23 and 24 October, and the second legs were played on 30 and 31 October 2024.

| Team 1 | Agg. | Team 2 | 1st leg | 2nd leg |
|---|---|---|---|---|
| Real Hope (Haiti) | 2–4 | (Dominican Republic) Cibao | 2–3 | 0–1 |
| Moca (Dominican Republic) | 0–7 | (Jamaica) Cavalier | 0–0 | 0–7 |

=== Third place play-offs ===
| Team 1 | Agg. | Team 2 | 1st leg | 2nd leg |
|---|---|---|---|---|
| Real Hope (Haiti) | 4–2 | (Dominican Republic) Moca | 1–0 | 3–2 |

=== Finals ===
| Team 1 | Agg. | Team 2 | 1st leg | 2nd leg |
|---|---|---|---|---|
| Cavalier (Jamaica) | 2–2 (a) | (Dominican Republic) Cibao | 1–0 | 1–2 |

== Top goalscorers ==
Team eliminated for this round.
Team inactive for this round.

| Rank | Player | Team | GS1 | GS2 | GS3 | GS4 | GS5 | SF1 | SF2 | TP1 | TP2 | F1 | F2 | Total |
|---|---|---|---|---|---|---|---|---|---|---|---|---|---|---|
| 1 | (Suriname) Shaquille Stein | (Jamaica) Cavalier | 1 | 2 | | | 1 | | 3 | | | 1 | | 8 |
| 2 | (Jamaica) Dwayne Atkinson | (Jamaica) Cavalier | | 2 | 1 | | 1 | | 1 | | | | 1 | 6 |
| 2 | (Colombia) Rivaldo Correa | (Dominican Republic) Cibao | | | | 2 | 1 | 1 | 1 | | | | 1 | 6 |
| 2 | (Haiti) Angelo Exilus | (Haiti) Real Hope | 1 | | | | 2 | 2 | | | 1 | | | 6 |
| 5 | (Argentina) Gustavo Ascona | (Dominican Republic) Moca | | 1 | 1 | | 1 | | | | | | | 3 |
| 5 | (Trinidad and Tobago) Shackiel Henry | (Trinidad and Tobago) Port of Spain | 1 | | 1 | 1 | | | | | | | | 3 |
| 5 | (Haiti) Joseph Willinx | (Haiti) Ouanaminthe | 1 | | | 2 | | | | | | | | 3 |
| 5 | (Dominican Republic) Jean Carlos López | (Dominican Republic) Cibao | | 1 | | 1 | | 1 | | | | | | 3 |
| 5 | (Dominican Republic) Guillermo de Peña | (Dominican Republic) Moca | | | | | 1 | | | | 2 | | | 3 |
| 10 | (Antigua and Barbuda) Jalmaro Calvin | (Jamaica) Cavalier | | | | | 2 | | | | | | | 2 |
| 10 | (Trinidad and Tobago) John-Paul Rochford | (Trinidad and Tobago) Port of Spain | | 2 | | | | | | | | | | 2 |
| 10 | (Dominican Republic) Edipo Rodriguez | (Dominican Republic) Cibao | | 1 | | | 1 | | | | | | | 2 |
| 10 | (Jamaica) Shai Smith | (Jamaica) Arnett Gardens | | 1 | | | 1 | | | | | | | 2 |
| 10 | (Jamaica) Christopher Ainsworth | (Jamaica) Cavalier | 1 | | | | | | 1 | | | | | 2 |
| 10 | (Colombia) Juan Díaz | (Dominican Republic) Cibao | | | | | | 1 | | | | | 1 | 2 |
| 10 | (Trinidad and Tobago) Kaïlé Auvray | (Jamaica) Cavalier | | | | | | | 2 | | | | | 2 |

== See also ==
- 2024 Leagues Cup
- 2024 CONCACAF Central American Cup
- 2024 CFU Club Shield
- 2025 CONCACAF Champions Cup
