= 2025 CONCACAF Champions Cup =

60th season of the CONCACAF club football tournament

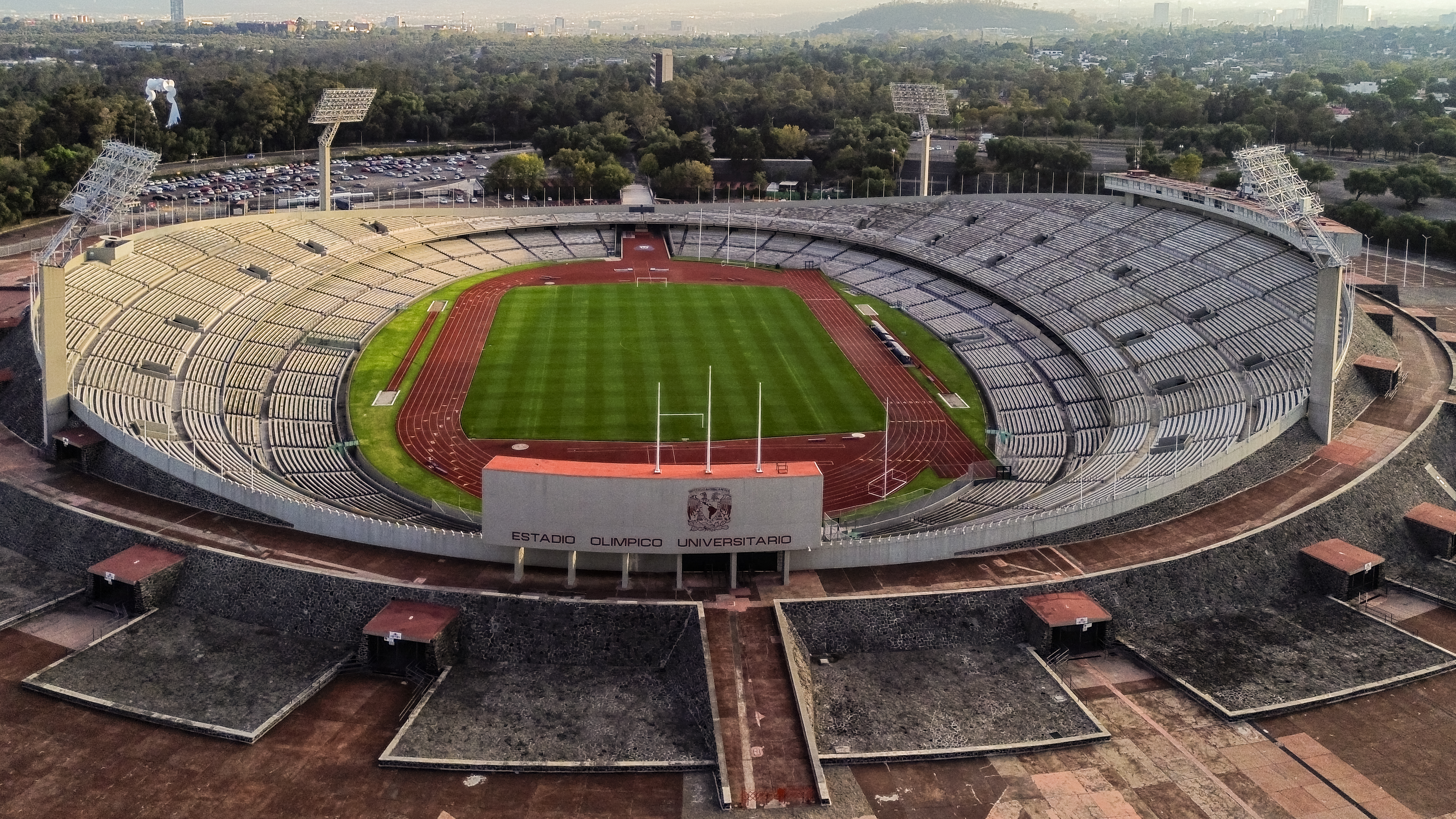
- The Estadio Olímpico Universitario in Mexico City hosted the final

Tournament details
- Dates: 4 February – 1 June
- Teams: 27 (from 10 associations)

Final positions
- Champions: (Mexico) Cruz Azul (7th title)
- Runners-up: (Canada) Vancouver Whitecaps FC

Tournament statistics
- Matches played: 51
- Goals scored: 133 (2.61 per match)
- Attendance: 844,867 (16,566 per match)
- Top scorer(s): (Mexico) Ángel Sepúlveda (Cruz Azul); 9 goals
- Best player: (Mexico) Ángel Sepúlveda (Cruz Azul)
- Best young player: (Greece) Noah Allen (Inter Miami CF)
- Best goalkeeper: (Colombia) Kevin Mier (Cruz Azul)
- Fair play award: (Canada) Vancouver Whitecaps FC

The 2025 CONCACAF Champions Cup was the 60th season of the CONCACAF Champions Cup, the premier club association football tournament for North, Central America, and the Caribbean's organized by CONCACAF. It was a five-round knockout tournament, with 27 teams that qualified based on their national and zonal league and cup competitions; the first four rounds were played as a two-legged series at the home stadiums of the respective teams.

Cruz Azul won their record-tying seventh title, defeating Vancouver Whitecaps of MLS in the final 5–0. As winners, they qualified for the 2029 FIFA Club World Cup and the 2025 FIFA Intercontinental Cup.

== Qualification ==
Twenty-seven teams qualified for the tournament, with five qualifying directly to the round of 16. The remaining 22 teams entered in round one.

In addition to national league competitions in the United States, Mexico, and Canada, 12 of 27 berths were determined by international competitions, including the revamped North American zonal competition, the 2024 Leagues Cup (three), and the existing regional or zonal championships in the Caribbean and Central America, the CONCACAF Caribbean Cup (three) and CONCACAF Central American Cup (six), respectively.

Two Canadian Premier League teams qualified automatically, while the United States-only 2024 U.S. Open Cup knockout competition and the Canada-only equivalent, the 2024 Canadian Championship, provided one berth each.

The winners of the three zonal championships, along with the winner of MLS Cup 2024 and the champion of the 2023–24 Liga MX season, received the five byes into the round of 16.

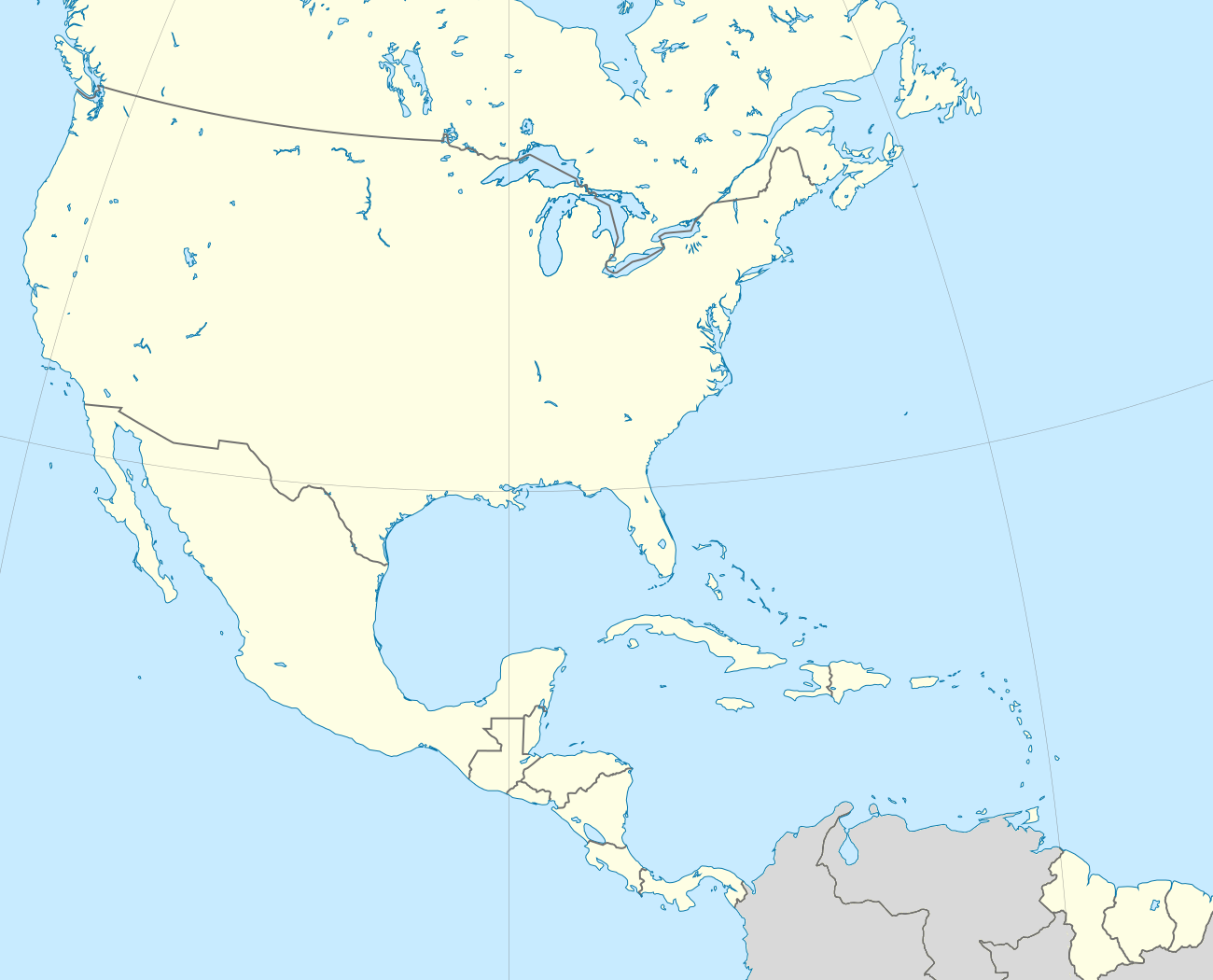
Location of teams of the 2025 CONCACAF Champions Cup
North American Zone Central American Zone Caribbean Zone

=== Distribution ===
A total of 27 teams (from 10 associations) qualified for the tournament.

- North American Zone: 18 teams (from three associations)
- Central American Zone: Six teams (from four associations)
- Caribbean Zone: Three teams (from three associations)

Five teams received a bye into the round of 16.

- The champion of the regional competitions for each of CONCACAF's constituent zones; North American, Central American, and Caribbean
- The champions of Liga MX of Mexico and Major League Soccer of the United States and Canada (Liga MX had a split Clausura and Apertura system, so the champion team with the higher aggregate points took this place. If a team won both Apertura and Clausura, they took this place.)

The remaining 22 teams entered in round one.

- The runners-up and third-place team from the MLS–Liga MX Leagues Cup
- The runners-up and third-place team from the Caribbean Cup
- The runners-up, remaining semi-finalists, and two play-in winners from the Central American Cup
- The U.S. Open Cup champion
- The Canadian Championship winner
- The Canadian Premier League regular season winner and playoff champion
- The remaining winner with the worse record, two runners-up, and the two best next clubs by season aggregate from Liga MX
- The MLS Supporters' Shield winner
- The remaining MLS Conference regular-season leader, and the next two teams in the Supporters' Shield table

== Teams ==
The following table includes the number of appearances, last appearance, and previous best from the CONCACAF Champions Cup tournament.

Teams entering in round of 16 (5)
Competition	Team	Qualifying method	App. (last)	Previous best (last)
Caribbean Cup	(Jamaica) Cavalier	2024 Caribbean Cup champions	2nd (2024)	First round (2024)
Central American Cup	(Costa Rica) Alajuelense	2024 Central American Cup champions	28th (2024)	Champions (2004)
Leagues Cup	(United States) Columbus Crew	2024 Leagues Cup champions	6th (2024)	Runners-up (2024)
Liga MX	(Mexico) América	2023–24 Liga MX Apertura and Clausura champions	16th (2024)	Champions (2015–16)
Major League Soccer	(United States) LA Galaxy	MLS Cup 2024 champions	11th (2015–16)	Champions (2000)

Teams entering in round one (22)
Competition	Team	Qualifying method	App. (last)	Previous best (last)
Canadian Championship (1 berth)	(Canada) Vancouver Whitecaps FC	2024 Canadian Championship winners	5th (2024)	Semi-finals (2016–17)
Canadian Premier League (2 berths)	(Canada) Cavalry FC	2024 Canadian Premier League champions	2nd (2024)	First round (2024)
Canadian Premier League (2 berths)	(Canada) Forge FC	2024 CPL Shield winners	3rd (2024)	Round of 16 (2022)
Caribbean Cup (2 berths)	(Dominican Republic) Cibao	2024 Caribbean Cup finalists	2nd (2018)	Round of 16 (2018)
Caribbean Cup (2 berths)	(Haiti) Real Hope	2024 Caribbean Cup third place	1st	Debut
Central American Cup (5 berths)	(Nicaragua) Real Estelí	2024 Central American Cup runners-up	13th (2024)	Round of 16 (2021)
Central American Cup (5 berths)	(Guatemala) Antigua	2024 Central American Cup semi-finalists	2nd (2016–17)	Group stage (2016–17)
Central American Cup (5 berths)	(Costa Rica) Herediano	2024 Central American Cup semi-finalists	17th (2024)	Semi-finals (2014–15)
Central American Cup (5 berths)	(Costa Rica) Saprissa	2024 Central American Cup play-in winners	38th (2024)	Champions (2005)
Central American Cup (5 berths)	(Honduras) Motagua	2024 Central American Cup play-in winners	21st (2023)	Quarter-finals (2023)
Leagues Cup (2 berths)	(United States) Los Angeles FC	2024 Leagues Cup runners-up	3rd (2023)	Runners-up (2023)
Leagues Cup (2 berths)	(United States) Colorado Rapids	2024 Leagues Cup third place	4th (2022)	Round of 16 (2022)
Liga MX (5 berths)	(Mexico) Cruz Azul	2023–24 Liga MX Clausura runners-up	18th (2022)	Champions (2013–14)
Liga MX (5 berths)	(Mexico) Tigres UANL	2023–24 Liga MX Apertura runners-up	12th (2024)	Champions (2020)
Liga MX (5 berths)	(Mexico) Monterrey	Next three best clubs in 2023–24 Liga MX aggregate table	13th (2024)	Champions (2021)
Liga MX (5 berths)	(Mexico) Guadalajara	Next three best clubs in 2023–24 Liga MX aggregate table	10th (2024)	Champions (2018)
Liga MX (5 berths)	(Mexico) Pumas UNAM	Next three best clubs in 2023–24 Liga MX aggregate table	12th (2022)	Champions (1989)
Major League Soccer (4 berths)	(United States) Inter Miami CF	2024 Major League Soccer Supporters' Shield winners	2nd (2024)	Quarter-finals (2024)
Major League Soccer (4 berths)	(United States) FC Cincinnati	Next best clubs in the 2024 Supporters' Shield standings	2nd (2024)	Round of 16 (2024)
Major League Soccer (4 berths)	(United States) Real Salt Lake	Next best clubs in the 2024 Supporters' Shield standings	4th (2015–16)	Runners-up (2010–11)
Major League Soccer (4 berths)	(United States) Seattle Sounders FC	Next best clubs in the 2024 Supporters' Shield standings	8th (2022)	Champions (2022)
U.S. Open Cup (1 berth)	(United States) Sporting Kansas City	2024 U.S. Open Cup runners-up	7th (2019)	Semi-finals (2019)

1. Mexico (MEX): Since América won both the Liga MX, Apertura and Clausura, a spot was passed to the third-best team in the aggregate table not already qualified, Pumas UNAM.
2. United States (USA): As the Columbus Crew, Los Angeles FC, and LA Galaxy already qualified based on their performances in other competitions, these berths were awarded to teams that finished 5th, 6th, and 7th in the overall standings.
3. United States (USA2): Sporting Kansas City qualified as 2024 U.S. Open Cup runners-up as the champions Los Angeles FC already qualified via the 2024 Leagues Cup.

== Draw ==
The draw for the tournament took place on 10 December 2024 in Miami. The ceremony was streamed on CONCACAF's YouTube channel and broadcast live on Fox Sports in the United States and Mexico and ESPN in most of the Americas. Teams were seeded and placed in draw pots based on their CONCACAF club ranking as of 9 December 2024.

The champions of CONCACAF's three regional cup competitions, as well as the Liga MX winners with the most accumulated points and the MLS Cup winners, received a bye to the round of 16. The three remaining highest-ranked clubs were pre-seeded into a round one bracket position.

Entering in round of 16
Seed	Team	Ranking points
1	(United States) Columbus Crew	1252
2	(Mexico) América	1242
3	(United States) LA Galaxy	1203
4	(Costa Rica) Alajuelense	1157
5	(Jamaica) Cavalier	1057

Seeded in round one
Seed	Team	Ranking points
1	(Mexico) Monterrey	1229
2	(Mexico) Tigres UANL	1227
3	(Mexico) Cruz Azul	1223

Pot 1
Team	Ranking points
(United States) Los Angeles FC	1222
(United States) Inter Miami CF	1216
(United States) Seattle Sounders FC	1202
(Mexico) Pumas UNAM	1200
(Mexico) Guadalajara	1199
(United States) FC Cincinnati	1194
(United States) Real Salt Lake	1191
(Canada) Vancouver Whitecaps FC	1173

Pot 2
Team	Ranking points
(United States) Colorado Rapids	1166
(United States) Sporting Kansas City	1159
(Costa Rica) Saprissa	1142
(Costa Rica) Herediano	1128
(Canada) Cavalry FC	1117
(Honduras) Motagua	1110
(Guatemala) Antigua	1108
(Canada) Forge FC	1106
(Nicaragua) Real Estelí	1076
(Dominican Republic) Cibao	1060
(Haiti) Real Hope	1025

== Schedule ==
The competition schedule was as follows.

Round	First leg	Second leg
Round one	4–6 and 18–20 February	11–13 and 25–27 February
Round of 16	4–6 March	11–13 March
Quarter-finals	1–2 April	8–9 April
Semi-finals	23–24 April	30 April – 1 May
Final	1 June	

Times are EST or EDT, (Note: EST (UTC−5) for dates up to 8 March 2024 (Round one and first legs of Round of 16), and EDT (UTC−4) for dates thereafter.) as listed by CONCACAF (local times, if different, are in parentheses).

== Bracket ==
Round one
(Dominican Republic) Cibao	1	0	1
(Mexico) Guadalajara	1	3	4
(Guatemala) Antigua	1	1	2
(United States) Seattle Sounders	3	3	6
(Haiti) Real Hope	0	0	0
(Mexico) Cruz Azul	2	5	7
(Costa Rica) Herediano	0	2	2
(United States) Real Salt Lake	0	1	1
(Honduras) Motagua	1	1	2
(United States) FC Cincinnati	4	1	5
(Nicaragua) Real Estelí	1	0	1
(Mexico) Tigres UANL	0	3	3
(United States) Colorado Rapids	2	0	2
(United States) Los Angeles FC (a)	1	1	2
(United States) Sporting Kansas City	0	1	1
(United States) Inter Miami	1	3	4
(Costa Rica) Saprissa	2	0	2
(Canada) Vancouver Whitecaps	1	2	3
(Canada) Forge FC	0	0	0
(Mexico) Monterrey	2	3	5
(Canada) Cavalry FC	2	0	2
(Mexico) Pumas UNAM	1	2	3

Round of 16
(Mexico) Guadalajara	1	0	1
(Mexico) América	0	4	4
(United States) Seattle Sounders	0	1	1
(Mexico) Cruz Azul	0	4	4
(Costa Rica) Herediano	1	1	2
(United States) LA Galaxy	0	4	4
(United States) FC Cincinnati	1	1	2
(Mexico) Tigres UANL	1	3	4
(United States) Los Angeles FC	3	1	4
(United States) Columbus Crew	0	2	2
(United States) Inter Miami	2	2	4
(Jamaica) Cavalier	0	0	0
(Canada) Vancouver Whitecaps (a)	1	2	3
(Mexico) Monterrey	1	2	3
(Mexico) Pumas UNAM	2	1	3
(Costa Rica) Alajuelense	0	1	1

Quarter-finals
(Mexico) América	0	1	1
(Mexico) Cruz Azul	0	2	2
(United States) LA Galaxy	0	2	2
(Mexico) Tigres UANL	0	3	3
(United States) Los Angeles FC	1	1	2
(United States) Inter Miami	0	3	3
(Canada) Vancouver Whitecaps (a)	1	2	3
(Mexico) Pumas UNAM	1	2	3

Semi-finals
(Mexico) Cruz Azul	1	1	2
(Mexico) Tigres UANL	1	0	1
(United States) Inter Miami	0	1	1
(Canada) Vancouver Whitecaps	2	3	5

Final
1 June – Mexico City
(Mexico) Cruz Azul	5
(Canada) Vancouver Whitecaps	0

== Round one ==
=== Summary ===
Round one was played during four weekly windows: on 4–6 February; 11–13 February; 18–20 February; and 25–27 February.

Team 1	Agg.	Team 2	1st leg	2nd leg
Colorado Rapids (United States)	2–2 (a)	(United States) Los Angeles FC	2–1	0–1
Sporting Kansas City (United States)	1–4	(United States) Inter Miami CF	0–1	1–3
Forge FC (Canada)	0–5	(Mexico) Monterrey	0–2	0–3
Saprissa (Costa Rica)	2–3	(Canada) Vancouver Whitecaps FC	2–1	0–2
Cavalry FC (Canada)	2–3	(Mexico) Pumas UNAM	2–1	0–2
Cibao (Dominican Republic)	1–4	(Mexico) Guadalajara	1–1	0–3
Real Hope (Haiti)	0–7	(Mexico) Cruz Azul	0–2	0–5
Antigua (Guatemala)	2–6	(United States) Seattle Sounders FC	1–3	1–3
Real Estelí (Nicaragua)	1–3	(Mexico) Tigres UANL	1–0	0–3
Motagua (Honduras)	2–5	(United States) FC Cincinnati	1–4	1–1
Herediano (Costa Rica)	2–1	(United States) Real Salt Lake	0–0	2–1

=== Matches ===
18 February 2025
22:00 (20:00 UTC–07:00)

Colorado Rapids (United States)	2–1	(United States) Los Angeles FC
Mihailovic 48' (pen.), 80'	Report	Long 87'

Dick's Sporting Goods Park, Commerce City
Attendance: 1,811
Referee: Oshane Nation (Jamaica)
25 February 2025
22:00 (19:00 UTC–08:00)

Los Angeles FC (United States)	1–0	(United States) Colorado Rapids
Delgado 49'	Report

BMO Stadium, Los Angeles
Attendance: 11,200
Referee: Pierre-Luc Lauzière (Canada)

2–2 on aggregate. Los Angeles FC won on away goals.

19 February 2025 (Note: Due to expected winter weather issues in the Kansas City metropolitan area, the game was pushed back a day.)
20:00 (19:00 UTC–06:00)

Sporting Kansas City (United States)	0–1	(United States) Inter Miami CF
	Report	Messi 56'

Children's Mercy Park, Kansas City
Attendance: 15,178
Referee: Marco Ortíz (Mexico)
25 February 2025
20:00

Inter Miami CF (United States)	3–1	(United States) Sporting Kansas City
Messi 19'; Allende 45+1'; Suárez 45+3'	Report	Rodríguez 63'

Chase Stadium, Fort Lauderdale
Attendance: 18,280
Referee: Ismael Cornejo (El Salvador)

Inter Miami CF won 4–1 on aggregate.

5 February 2025
20:00

Forge FC (Canada)	0–2	(Mexico) Monterrey
	Report	Deossa 53'; Cortizo 66'

Hamilton Stadium, Hamilton
Attendance: 5,413
Referee: Lukasz Szpala (United States)
11 February 2025
20:00 (19:00 UTC–06:00)

Monterrey (Mexico)	3–0	(Canada) Forge FC
Berterame 19', 58'; Cortizo 48'	Report

Estadio BBVA, Guadalupe
Attendance: 24,630
Referee: Walter López (Guatemala)

Monterrey won 5–0 on aggregate.

20 February 2025
20:00 (19:00 UTC–06:00)

Saprissa (Costa Rica)	2–1	(Canada) Vancouver Whitecaps FC
Torres 52'; Rodríguez 90+5'	Report	Gauld 21'

Estadio Ricardo Saprissa Aymá, San Juan de Tibás
Attendance: 10,957
Referee: Iván Barton (El Salvador)
27 February 2025
22:00 (19:00 UTC–08:00)

Vancouver Whitecaps FC (Canada)	2–0	(Costa Rica) Saprissa
White 46', 90+1'	Report

BC Place, Vancouver
Attendance: 14,059
Referee: Adonai Escobedo (Mexico)

Vancouver Whitecaps FC won 3–2 on aggregate.

6 February 2025
22:00 (19:00 UTC−08:00)

Cavalry FC (Canada)	2–1	(Mexico) Pumas UNAM
Trafford 57'; Warschewski 80'	Report	López 44'

Starlight Stadium, Langford (Note: Due to expected winter weather issues in Calgary, Cavalry FC played their first round match in Langford, British Columbia.)
Attendance: 3,139
Referee: Mario Escobar (Guatemala)
13 February 2025
20:00 (19:00 UTC−06:00)

Pumas UNAM (Mexico)	2–0	(Canada) Cavalry FC
Martínez 53', 74'	Report

Estadio Olímpico Universitario, Mexico City
Attendance: 8,778
Referee: Juan Gabriel Calderón (Costa Rica)

Pumas UNAM won 3–2 on aggregate.

6 February 2025
20:00 (21:00 UTC–04:00)

Cibao (Dominican Republic)	1–1	(Mexico) Guadalajara
Díaz 1'	Report	Rey 90+10'

Estadio Cibao FC, Santiago de los Caballeros
Attendance: 3,008
Referee: Kwinsi Williams (Trinidad and Tobago)
12 February 2025
20:00 (19:00 UTC–06:00)

Guadalajara (Mexico)	3–0	(Dominican Republic) Cibao
Beltrán 22'; Hernández 55'; González 78'	Report

Estadio Akron, Zapopan
Attendance: 14,939
Referee: Joe Dickerson (United States)

Guadalajara won 4–1 on aggregate.

4 February 2025
20:00 (21:00 UTC–04:00)

Real Hope (Haiti)	0–2	(Mexico) Cruz Azul
	Report	Sepúlveda 38'; Guillaume 84' (o.g.)

Estadio Cibao FC, Santiago de los Caballeros (Dominican Republic)
Attendance: 1,017
Referee: Natalie Simon (United States)
11 February 2025
22:00 (21:00 UTC–06:00)

Cruz Azul (Mexico)	5–0	(Haiti) Real Hope
Sepúlveda 21', 24'; Fernández 26', 75'; Montaño 60'	Report

Estadio Olímpico Universitario, Mexico City
Attendance: 4,293
Referee: Julio Luna (Guatemala)

Cruz Azul won 7–0 on aggregate.

19 February 2025
20:00 (19:00 UTC–06:00)

Antigua (Guatemala)	1–3	(United States) Seattle Sounders FC
Santis 24'	Report	Arriola 3'; De la Vega 61'; Rusnák 90+5'

Estadio Pensativo, Antigua Guatemala
Attendance: 2,200
Referee: Katia García (Mexico)
26 February 2025
22:30 (19:30 UTC–08:00)

Seattle Sounders FC (United States)	3–1	(Guatemala) Antigua
De la Vega 24', 88'; Arriola 53'	Report	Gálvez 45+2'

Lumen Field, Seattle
Attendance: 24,714
Referee: Selvin Brown (Honduras)

Seattle Sounders FC won 6–2 on aggregate.

5 February 2025
22:00 (21:00 UTC–06:00)

Real Estelí (Nicaragua)	1–0	(Mexico) Tigres UANL
Grahl 83'	Report

Estadio Independencia, Estelí
Attendance: 3,771
Referee: Keylor Herrera (Costa Rica)
12 February 2025
22:00 (21:00 UTC–06:00)

Tigres UANL (Mexico)	3–0	(Nicaragua) Real Estelí
Herrera 2'; Lainez 14'; Vigón 85'	Report

Estadio Universitario, San Nicolás de los Garza
Attendance: 22,351
Referee: Armando Villarreal (United States)

Tigres UANL won 3–1 on aggregate.

19 February 2025
22:00 (21:00 UTC–06:00)

Motagua (Honduras)	1–4	(United States) FC Cincinnati
Auzmendi 41'	Report	Bucha 28', 78'; Denkey 49'; Evander 87'

Estadio Nacional Chelato Uclés, Tegucigalpa
Attendance: 2,917
Referee: Bryan López (Guatemala)
26 February 2025
18:30

FC Cincinnati (United States)	1–1	(Honduras) Motagua
Denkey 19'	Report	Auzmendi 10'

TQL Stadium, Cincinnati
Attendance: 21,280
Referee: Víctor Cáceres Hernández (Mexico)

FC Cincinnati won 5–2 on aggregate.

19 February 2025
18:30 (17:30 UTC–06:00)

Herediano (Costa Rica)	0–0	(United States) Real Salt Lake
	Report

Estadio Nacional, San José
Attendance: 3,062
Referee: Saíd Martínez (Honduras)
26 February 2025
20:30 (18:30 UTC–07:00)

Real Salt Lake (United States)	1–2	(Costa Rica) Herediano
Ajago 26'	Report	Aguilar 70'; Vega 90+9' (pen.)

America First Field, Sandy
Attendance: 9,000
Referee: Fernando Hernández (Mexico)

Herediano won 2–1 on aggregate.

== Round of 16 ==
=== Summary ===
The first legs were played on 4–6 March, and the second legs were played on 11–13 March 2025.

Team 1	Agg.	Team 2	1st leg	2nd leg
Los Angeles FC (United States)	4–2	(United States) Columbus Crew	3–0	1–2
Inter Miami CF (United States)	4–0	(Jamaica) Cavalier	2–0	2–0
Vancouver Whitecaps FC (Canada)	3–3 (a)	(Mexico) Monterrey	1–1	2–2
Pumas UNAM (Mexico)	3–1	(Costa Rica) Alajuelense	2–0	1–1
Guadalajara (Mexico)	1–4	(Mexico) América	1–0	0–4
Seattle Sounders FC (United States)	1–4	(Mexico) Cruz Azul	0–0	1–4
FC Cincinnati (United States)	2–4	(Mexico) Tigres UANL	1–1	1–3
Herediano (Costa Rica)	2–4	(United States) LA Galaxy	1–0	1–4

=== Matches ===
4 March 2025
22:30 (19:30 UTC−8)

Los Angeles FC (United States)	3–0	(United States) Columbus Crew
Bouanga 20', 46'; Ordaz 81'	Report

BMO Stadium, Los Angeles
Attendance: 7,285
Referee: César Ramos (Mexico)
11 March 2025
20:30

Columbus Crew (United States)	2–1	(United States) Los Angeles FC
Russell-Rowe 10'; Rossi 45' (pen.)	Report	Bouanga 90+6'

Lower.com Field, Columbus
Attendance: 6,205
Referee: Iván Barton (El Salvador)

Los Angeles FC won 4–2 on aggregate.

6 March 2025
20:00

Inter Miami CF (United States)	2–0	(Jamaica) Cavalier
Allende 61'; Suárez 83'	Report

Chase Stadium, Fort Lauderdale
Attendance: 15,413
Referee: Mario Escobar (Guatemala)
13 March 2025
20:00 (19:00 UTC−5)

Cavalier (Jamaica)	0–2	(United States) Inter Miami CF
	Report	Suárez 37' (pen.); Messi 90+2'

National Stadium, Kingston
Attendance: 35,000
Referee: Keylor Herrera (Costa Rica)

Inter Miami CF won 4–0 on aggregate.

5 March 2025
22:30 (19:30 UTC−8)

Vancouver Whitecaps FC (Canada)	1–1	(Mexico) Monterrey
Halbouni 86'	Report	De la Rosa 25'

BC Place, Vancouver
Attendance: 9,613
Referee: Kwinsi Williams (Trinidad and Tobago)
12 March 2025
20:30 (18:30 UTC−6)

Monterrey (Mexico)	2–2	(Canada) Vancouver Whitecaps FC
Canales 4'; Ramos 90+7' (pen.)	Report	Ocampo 57'; White 78'

Estadio Corona, Torreón (Note: Due to a Shakira concert at Estadio BBVA, Monterrey played their home round of 16 match in Torreón.)
Attendance: 10,420
Referee: Selvin Brown (Honduras)

3–3 on aggregate. Vancouver Whitecaps FC won on away goals.

4 March 2025
20:30 (19:30 UTC−6)

Pumas UNAM (Mexico)	2–0	(Costa Rica) Alajuelense
Ergas 38'; Funes Mori 73'	Report

Estadio Olímpico Universitario, Mexico City
Attendance: 9,276
Referee: Tori Penso (United States)
13 March 2025
22:00 (20:00 UTC−6)

Alajuelense (Costa Rica)	1–1	(Mexico) Pumas UNAM
Campos 39'	Report	Suárez 72'

Estadio Alejandro Morera Soto, Alajuela
Attendance: 12,052
Referee: Lukasz Szpala (United States)

Pumas UNAM won 3–1 on aggregate.

5 March 2025
20:30 (19:30 UTC−6)

Guadalajara (Mexico)	1–0	(Mexico) América
Cáceres 77' (o.g.)	Report

Estadio Akron, Zapopan
Attendance: 41,695
Referee: Drew Fischer (Canada)
12 March 2025
22:30 (20:30 UTC−6)

América (Mexico)	4–0	(Mexico) Guadalajara
Rodríguez 6'; Valdés 45'; Zendejas 65'; Fidalgo 79'	Report

Estadio Ciudad de los Deportes, Mexico City
Attendance: 29,391
Referee: Walter López (Guatemala)

América won 4–1 on aggregate.

5 March 2025
22:30 (19:30 UTC−8)

Seattle Sounders FC (United States)	0–0	(Mexico) Cruz Azul
	Report

Lumen Field, Seattle
Attendance: 27,844
Referee: Julio Luna (Guatemala)
11 March 2025
20:30 (18:30 UTC−6)

Cruz Azul (Mexico)	4–1	(United States) Seattle Sounders FC
Rodríguez 33'; Sepúlveda 71' (pen.); Romero 85'; Sánchez 88'	Report	Musovski 75'

Estadio Olímpico Universitario, Mexico City
Attendance: 7,473
Referee: Oshane Nation (Jamaica)

Cruz Azul won 4–1 on aggregate.

4 March 2025
18:30

FC Cincinnati (United States)	1–1	(Mexico) Tigres UANL
Bucha 3'	Report	Ibáñez 17'

TQL Stadium, Cincinnati
Attendance: 14,298
Referee: Bryan López (Guatemala)
11 March 2025
22:30 (20:30 UTC−6)

Tigres UANL (Mexico)	3–1	(United States) FC Cincinnati
Herrera 64'; Brunetta 69'; Ibáñez 73'	Report	Evander 18'

Estadio Universitario, San Nicolás de los Garza
Attendance: 27,992
Referee: Saíd Martínez (Honduras)

Tigres UANL won 4–2 on aggregate.

5 March 2025
20:30 (19:30 UTC−6)

Herediano (Costa Rica)	1–0	(United States) LA Galaxy
Aguilar 65'	Report

Estadio Eladio Rosabal Cordero, Heredia
Attendance: 7,773
Referee: Adonai Escobedo (Mexico)
12 March 2025
22:30 (19:30 UTC−7)

LA Galaxy (United States)	4–1	(Costa Rica) Herediano
Aude 30'; Berry 38'; Gabriel Pec 53'; Ramirez 76'	Report	González 82'

Dignity Health Sports Park, Carson
Attendance: 9,011
Referee: Ismael Cornejo (El Salvador)

LA Galaxy won 4–2 on aggregate.

== Quarter-finals ==
Within each matchup, the team which had the better performance in the round of 16 hosted the second leg.

Pos	Team	Pld	W	D	L	GF	GA	GD	Pts	Host
1 (QF1)	(United States) Inter Miami CF	2	2	0	0	4	0	+4	6	Second leg
2 (QF1)	(United States) Los Angeles FC	2	1	0	1	4	2	+2	3	First leg
1 (QF2)	(Mexico) Pumas UNAM	2	1	1	0	3	1	+2	4	Second leg
2 (QF2)	(Canada) Vancouver Whitecaps FC	2	0	2	0	3	3	0	2	First leg
1 (QF3)	(Mexico) Cruz Azul	2	1	1	0	4	1	+3	4	Second leg
2 (QF3)	(Mexico) América	2	1	0	1	4	1	+3	3	First leg
1 (QF4)	(Mexico) Tigres UANL	2	1	1	0	4	2	+2	4	Second leg
2 (QF4)	(United States) LA Galaxy	2	1	0	1	4	2	+2	3	First leg

Source: CONCACAF
Rules for classification: 1) Points; 2) Goal difference; 3) Goals scored; 4) Away goals scored; 5) Wins; 6) Away wins; 7) Disciplinary points; 8) Drawing of lots (Regulations Article 12.9.5).

=== Summary ===
The first legs were played on 1 and 2 April, and the second legs were played on 8 and 9 April 2025.

Team 1	Agg.	Team 2	1st leg	2nd leg
Los Angeles FC (United States)	2–3	(United States) Inter Miami CF	1–0	1–3
Vancouver Whitecaps FC (Canada)	3–3 (a)	(Mexico) Pumas UNAM	1–1	2–2
América (Mexico)	1–2	(Mexico) Cruz Azul	0–0	1–2
LA Galaxy (United States)	2–3	(Mexico) Tigres UANL	0–0	2–3

=== Matches ===
1 April 2025
21:15 (19:15 UTC−6)

América (Mexico)	0–0	(Mexico) Cruz Azul
	Report

Estadio Ciudad de los Deportes, Mexico City
Attendance: 19,720
Referee: Joe Dickerson (United States)
8 April 2025
23:30 (21:30 UTC−6)

Cruz Azul (Mexico)	2–1	(Mexico) América
Sepúlveda 12', 85'	Report	Fidalgo 57'

Estadio Olímpico Universitario, Mexico City
Attendance: 27,923
Referee: Ismael Cornejo (El Salvador)

Cruz Azul won 2–1 on aggregate.

1 April 2025
23:15 (20:15 UTC−7)

LA Galaxy (United States)	0–0	(Mexico) Tigres UANL
	Report

Dignity Health Sports Park, Carson
Attendance: 13,434
Referee: Kwinsi Williams (Trinidad and Tobago)
8 April 2025
21:00 (19:00 UTC−6)

Tigres UANL (Mexico)	3–2	(United States) LA Galaxy
Ibáñez 9'; Antuna 10'; Rômulo 57'	Report	Paintsil 40'; Garcés 60'

Estadio Universitario, San Nicolás de los Garza
Attendance: 34,435
Referee: Selvin Brown (Honduras)

Tigres UANL won 3–2 on aggregate.

2 April 2025
23:30 (20:30 UTC−7)

Los Angeles FC (United States)	1–0	(United States) Inter Miami CF
Ordaz 57'	Report

BMO Stadium, Los Angeles
Attendance: 22,207
Referee: Oshane Nation (Jamaica)
9 April 2025
20:00

Inter Miami CF (United States)	3–1	(United States) Los Angeles FC
Messi 35', 84' (pen.); Redondo 61'	Report	Long 9'

Chase Stadium, Fort Lauderdale
Attendance: 19,609
Referee: César Ramos (Mexico)

Inter Miami CF won 3–2 on aggregate.

2 April 2025
21:30 (18:30 UTC−7)

Vancouver Whitecaps FC (Canada)	1–1	(Mexico) Pumas UNAM
White 71'	Report	Carrasquilla 87'

BC Place, Vancouver
Attendance: 12,356
Referee: Keylor Herrera (Costa Rica)
9 April 2025
22:30 (20:30 UTC−6)

Pumas UNAM (Mexico)	2–2	(Canada) Vancouver Whitecaps FC
Martínez 37'; Pussetto 88'	Report	Berhalter 33'; Blackmon 90+3'

Estadio Olímpico Universitario, Mexico City
Attendance: 19,397
Referee: Walter López (Guatemala)

3–3 on aggregate. Vancouver Whitecaps FC won on away goals.

== Semi-finals ==
In the semi-finals, the matchups were determined as follows:

- SF1: Winner QF1 vs. Winner QF2
- SF2: Winner QF3 vs. Winner QF4

The semi-finalists in each tie which had the better performance in previous rounds (excluding round one) hosted the second leg.

Pos	Team	Pld	W	D	L	GF	GA	GD	Pts	Host
1 (SF1)	(United States) Inter Miami CF	4	3	0	1	7	2	+5	9	Second leg
2 (SF1)	(Canada) Vancouver Whitecaps FC	4	0	4	0	6	6	0	4	First leg
1 (SF2)	(Mexico) Cruz Azul	4	2	2	0	6	2	+4	8	Second leg
2 (SF2)	(Mexico) Tigres UANL	4	2	2	0	7	4	+3	8	First leg

Source: CONCACAF
Rules for classification: 1) Points; 2) Goal difference; 3) Goals scored; 4) Away goals scored; 5) Wins; 6) Away wins; 7) Disciplinary points (1 point for yellow card, 3 points for indirect red card, 4 points for direct red card, 5 points for yellow card and direct red card); 8) Drawing of lots (Regulations Article 12.9.5).

=== Summary ===
The first legs were played on 23 and 24 April, and the second legs were played on 30 April and 1 May 2025.

Team 1	Agg.	Team 2	1st leg	2nd leg
Vancouver Whitecaps FC (Canada)	5–1	(United States) Inter Miami CF	2–0	3–1
Tigres UANL (Mexico)	1–2	(Mexico) Cruz Azul	1–1	0–1

=== Matches ===
24 April 2025
22:30 (19:30 UTC−8)

Vancouver Whitecaps FC (Canada)	2–0	(United States) Inter Miami CF
White 24'; Berhalter 85'	Report

BC Place, Vancouver
Attendance: 53,837
Referee: Mario Escobar (Guatemala)
30 April 2025
20:00

Inter Miami CF (United States)	1–3	(Canada) Vancouver Whitecaps FC
Alba 9'	Report	White 51'; Vite 53'; Berhalter 71'

Chase Stadium, Fort Lauderdale
Attendance: 21,225
Referee: Saíd Martínez (Honduras)

Vancouver Whitecaps FC won 5–1 on aggregate.

23 April 2025
22:00 (21:00 UTC−6)

Tigres UANL (Mexico)	1–1	(Mexico) Cruz Azul
Purata 84'	Report	Rotondi 68'

Estadio Universitario, San Nicolás de los Garza
Attendance: 31,251
Referee: Iván Barton (El Salvador)
1 May 2025
22:00 (21:00 UTC−6)

Cruz Azul (Mexico)	1–0	(Mexico) Tigres UANL
Sepúlveda 82' (pen.)	Report

Estadio Olímpico Universitario, Mexico City
Attendance: 39,689
Referee: Drew Fischer (Canada)

Cruz Azul won 2–1 on aggregate.

== Final ==
The finalist with the better record during the competition's earlier stages (excluding round one), Cruz Azul, hosted the match at Estadio Olímpico Universitario in Mexico City.

Pos	Team	Pld	W	D	L	GF	GA	GD	Pts	Final
1	(Mexico) Cruz Azul (H)	6	3	3	0	8	3	+5	12	Host
2	(Canada) Vancouver Whitecaps FC	6	2	4	0	11	7	+4	10	

Source: CONCACAF
Rules for classification: 1) Points; 2) Goal difference; 3) Goals scored; 4) Away goals scored; 5) Wins; 6) Away wins; 7) Disciplinary points; 8) Drawing of lots.
(H) Hosts

=== Match ===
1 June 2025
21:00 (19:00 UTC−6)

Cruz Azul (Mexico)	5–0	(Canada) Vancouver Whitecaps FC
Rivero 8'; Faravelli 28'; Sepúlveda 37', 50'; Bogusz 45'	Report

Estadio Olímpico Universitario, Mexico City
Attendance: 33,046
Referee: Walter López (Guatemala)

== Statistics ==
=== Top goalscorers ===
Rank	Player	Team	Goals
1	(Mexico) Ángel Sepúlveda	(Mexico) Cruz Azul	9
2	(United States) Brian White	(Canada) Vancouver Whitecaps FC	6
3	(Argentina) Lionel Messi	(United States) Inter Miami CF	5
4	(United States) Sebastian Berhalter	(Canada) Vancouver Whitecaps FC	3
4	(Gabon) Denis Bouanga	(United States) Los Angeles FC	3
4	(Czech Republic) Pavel Bucha	(United States) FC Cincinnati	3
4	(Argentina) Pedro de la Vega	(United States) Seattle Sounders FC	3
4	(Argentina) Nicolás Ibáñez	(Mexico) Tigres UANL	3
4	(Uruguay) Luis Suárez	(United States) Inter Miami CF	3
10	Multiple players (14)		2

=== Best XI ===
CONCACAF selected the following players as the team of the tournament.

Pos.	Player	Team
GK	(Colombia) Kevin Mier	(Mexican Football Federation) Cruz Azul
DF	(Greece) Noah Allen	(United States Soccer Federation) Inter Miami CF
DF	(Colombia) Willer Ditta	(Mexican Football Federation) Cruz Azul
DF	(Argentina) Gonzalo Piovi	(Mexican Football Federation) Cruz Azul
DF	(Argentina) Carlos Rotondi	(Mexican Football Federation) Cruz Azul
MF	(Uruguay) Ignacio Rivero	(Mexican Football Federation) Cruz Azul
MF	(United States) Sebastian Berhalter	(Canadian Soccer Association) Vancouver Whitecaps FC
MF	(Argentina) Juan Brunetta	(Mexican Football Federation) Tigres UANL
MF	(Mexico) Carlos Rodríguez	(Mexican Football Federation) Cruz Azul
FW	(United States) Brian White	(Canadian Soccer Association) Vancouver Whitecaps FC
FW	(Mexico) Ángel Sepúlveda	(Mexican Football Federation) Cruz Azul

=== Awards ===
Award	Player	Team	Ref.
Best Player Award	(Mexico) Ángel Sepúlveda	(Mexican Football Federation) Cruz Azul	
Best Goalkeeper Award	(Colombia) Kevin Mier	(Mexican Football Federation) Cruz Azul	
Young Player Award	(Greece) Noah Allen	(United States Soccer Federation) Inter Miami CF	
Top Scorer Award	(Mexico) Ángel Sepúlveda	(Mexican Football Federation) Cruz Azul	
Fair Play Award	—N/a	(Canadian Soccer Association) Vancouver Whitecaps FC	
