= Jalmaro Calvin =

Jamaican footballer (born 2003)

Personal information
- Full name: Jalmaro Tyreese Calvin
- Date of birth: 30 June 2003 (age 23)
- Place of birth: Jamaica
- Height: 1.73 m (5 ft 8 in)
- Positions: Winger; striker

Team information
- Current team: St Mirren
- Number: 17

Senior career*
Years	Team	Apps	(Gls)
2022	Cavalier	7	(0)
2022–2023	→ Ottos Rangers (loan)		
2023–2025	Cavalier	71	(31)
2025–	St Mirren	5	(0)

International career^{‡}
2022–2024	Antigua and Barbuda U20	3	(0)
2024	Antigua and Barbuda	1	(0)
2025–	Jamaica	2	(0)
- * Club domestic league appearances and goals as of 20 May 2026 ‡ National team caps and goals as of 9 February 2025

Jalmaro Tyreese Calvin (born 30 June 2003) is a Jamaican footballer who plays as a winger or striker for Scottish Premiership club St Mirren. Born in Jamaica, he represented Antigua and Barbuda before switching back to his native Jamaica.

== Club career ==
In 2023, Calvin signed for Jamaican side Cavalier. He was regarded as one of the club's most important players. He helped the club win the league.

On 22 July 2025, Calvin signed for Scottish Premiership club St Mirren on an initial two-year deal.

== International career ==
Calvin was an Antigua and Barbuda international before changing his allegiance to represent his native Jamaica. He played for the Antigua and Barbuda national under-20 football team at the 2022 CONCACAF U-20 Championship.

== Personal life ==
Calvin was born in 2003 in Jamaica. He lived in Antigua and Barbuda as a child.

== Career statistics ==
=== International ===
As of match played 9 February 2025

Appearances and goals by national team and year
National team	Year	Apps	Goals
Antigua and Barbuda	2024	1	0
Total		1	0
Jamaica	2025	2	0
Total		2	0
Career total		3	0

== Honours ==
=== Club ===
Cavalier

- Jamaica Premier League: 2023–24, 2024–25
- CONCACAF Caribbean Cup: 2024

=== Individual ===
- CONCACAF Caribbean Cup Best Young Player: 2024
- CONCACAF Caribbean Cup Best XI: 2024
