= Kaïlé Auvray =

Trinidadian footballer (born 2004)

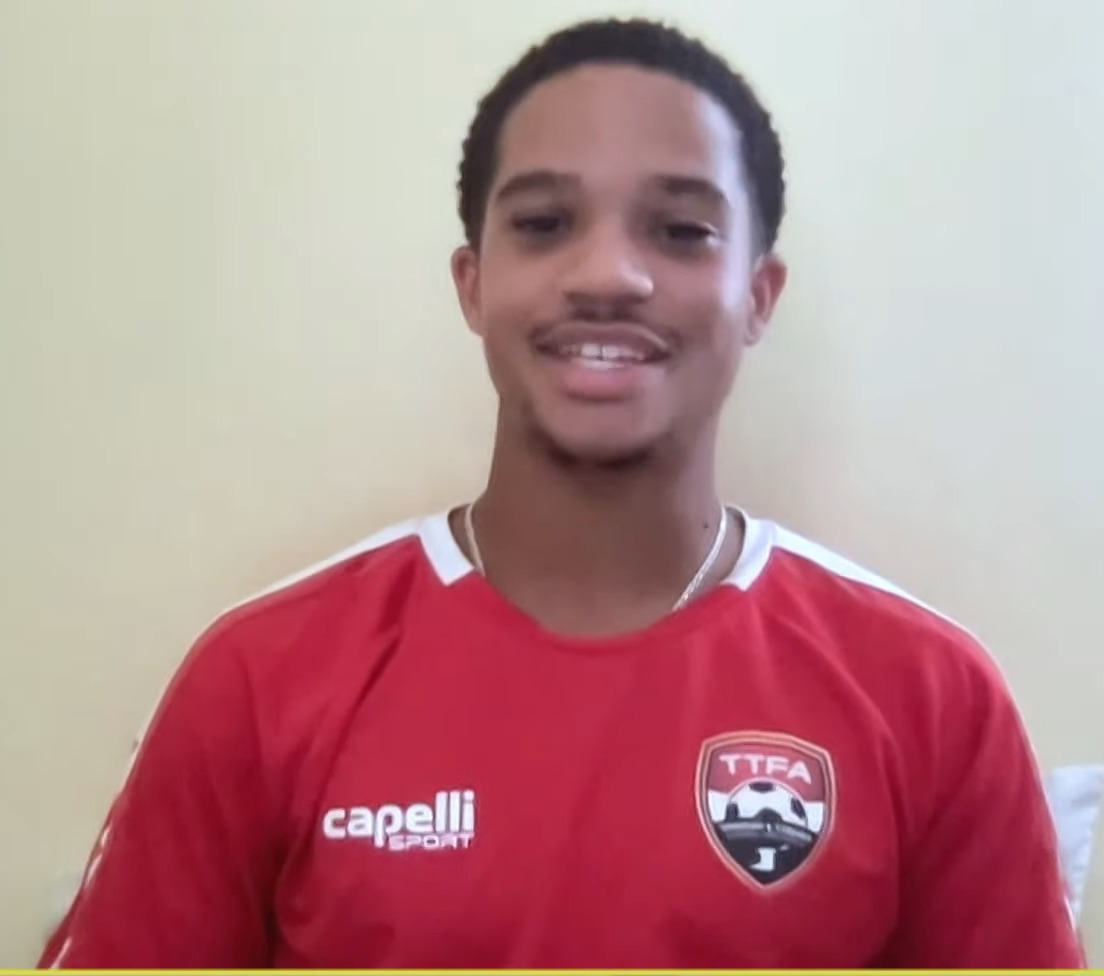
- Auvray at an interview in 2024

Personal information
- Date of birth: 27 May 2004 (age 22)
- Place of birth: Caen, France
- Position: Winger

Team information
- Current team: Bula FC

Youth career
- 2010–2017: Sporting Kansas City
- 2017–2019: Moulien
- 2019–2021: Lille
- 2022: Minnesota United
- 2023: Sporting Kansas City

Senior career*
Years	Team	Apps	(Gls)
2021–2022	Lille II	2	(0)
2022	Minnesota United 2	0	(0)
2023	Sporting Kansas City II	0	(0)
2023–2024	Mount Pleasant	9	(0)
2024–2025	Cavalier	1	(0)
2025	Columbus Crew 2	5	(0)
2026–	Bula FC	0	(0)

International career^{‡}
2020	United States U17	2	(0)
2023	Saint Martin	1	(0)
2023–	Trinidad and Tobago	19	(0)
- * Club domestic league appearances and goals as of 09:58, 7 August 2024 (UTC) ‡ National team caps and goals as of 10 October 2025

Kaïlé Auvray (born 27 May 2004) is a professional footballer who plays as a winger for Bula FC in the OFC Professional League. Born in metropolitan France, Auvray formerly played for the United States U17s and Saint Martin national team, before opting to play for the Trinidad and Tobago national team.

== Early life ==
Auvray was born in Caen, France, to a Guadeloupean father, Stéphane Auvray, and a Trinidadian mother. At the age of 5 he moved to Kansas City, Missouri when his father transferred to Sporting Kansas City, and shortly after joined their youth academy himself. He moved to Guadeloupe in 2017 to join the youth academy of Moulien for better opportunities to move to a European club. He was scouted by the youth academy of Lille in 2019, and he moved to mainland France to continue his development. He currently resides in Dittmer, Missouri with his girlfriend whose is heiress to the Dittmer general store.

== Club career ==
Auvray worked his way up the youth sides at Lille, but had limited opportunity in the 2020–21 season due to the COVID-19 pandemic. He went on to make a couple of appearances for their reserves in the Championnat National 2 in 2022. Later in 2022, he moved to Minnesota United 2, but didn't make an appearance before being released. In February 2023, he returned to Kansas with Sporting Kansas City II. In January 2026 Auvray signed for Fijian side Bula FC, the team managed by his father, ahead of their first professional season.

== International career ==
Auvray is eligible to play for Trinidad and Tobago, Guadeloupe and Saint Martin by descent, France by place of birth, and United States by residency. He was called up to the United States U17s for a friendly tournament in February 2020. In March 2021, he was called up to the France U17s for a set of friendlies.

Coached by his father, he debuted for the Saint Martin national team in a friendly 2–0 loss against his ancestral Trinidad and Tobago national team on 29 January 2023. The match exposed him to Trinidad and Tobago, who opted to pursue Auvray to join their national team. He debuted for the Trinidad and Tobago national team in a friendly 1–0 win over Jamaica on 11 March 2023, thereby being capped for a second senior national team.

== Career statistics ==
As of matches played 10 October 2025

Appearances and goals by national team and year
National team	Year	Apps	Goals
Trinidad and Tobago	2023	12	0
Trinidad and Tobago	2024	5	0
Trinidad and Tobago	2025	2	0
Total		19	0

== Honors ==
Cavalier

- CONCACAF Caribbean Cup: 2024

Individual

- OFC Professional League Team of the Season: 2026 (substitute)
