= Raheem Edwards (footballer, born 2002) =

Jamaican footballer (born 2002)

Personal information
- Date of birth: August 14, 2002 (age 24)
- Place of birth: Jamaica
- Height: 1.80 m (5 ft 11 in)
- Position: Forward

Team information
- Current team: RAEC Mons

Senior career*
Years	Team	Apps	(Gls)
2022–2024	Racing United		
2024–2026	Mount Pleasant	70	(36)
2026–	RAEC Mons	0	(0)

International career^{‡}
2026–	Jamaica	2	(0)
- * Club domestic league appearances and goals as of August 29, 2026 ‡ National team caps and goals as of 31 May 2026

Raheem Edwards (born 14 August 2002) is a Jamaican footballer who plays as a forward for RAEC Mons in the Belgian Division 1 and the Jamaica national team.

== Club career ==
In 2023, Edwards played with Racing United in the second-tier JFF Championship. On May 13, 2023, he scored four goals in a 9–0 victory over Wadada United, putting him at 18 goals through just five matches at the time. In the final regular season match of the 2022–23 season, he scored a hat trick in a 3–2 victory over Treasure Beach to clinch the regular season title and qualify for the semi-finals of the promotion series.

In 2024, he moved to Mount Pleasant in the Jamaica Premier League. On November 18, 2024, he scored an equalizing goal in stoppage time to earn a point for his club against the Chapelton Maroons. He scored 13 goals in his first season with the club. He won the 2025 CONCACAF Caribbean Cup with the club. On December 28, 2025, he scored the winning goal in a 1–0 victory over Montego Bay United. He won the league's Golden Boot as top scorer in 2025–26 with 23 goals.

In August 2026, he signed a three-year deal with Belgian Division 1 club RAEC Mons.

== International career ==
In January 2025, he was called up to the Jamaica national team for a friendly against Trinidad and Tobago. In February 2026, Edwards was called up to the squad, featuring an entirely locally based squad, for a friendly against Martinique. He made his national team debut in the match on 22 February. In May 2026, he was named to the squad for the 2026 Unity Cup friendly series.

== Career statistics ==
=== International ===
As of match played 30 May 2026

Appearances and goals by national team and year
National team	Year	Apps	Goals
Jamaica	2026	2	0
Total		2	0

== Honours ==
=== Club ===
Mount Pleasant

- CONCACAF Caribbean Cup: 2025

Individual

- Jamaica Premier League Golden Boot: 2025–26
