= Dwayne Atkinson =

Jamaican footballer (born 2002)

Personal information
- Date of birth: 5 May 2002 (age 24)
- Place of birth: Kingston, Jamaica
- Position: Forward

Team information
- Current team: Rhode Island FC
- Number: 7

Youth career
- 2019–2020: Cavalier

Senior career*
Years	Team	Apps	(Gls)
2020–2023	Cavalier	71	(23)
2023–2024	ÍBV	10	(1)
2024–2025	Cavalier	38	(12)
2025–	Rhode Island FC	50	(3)

International career^{‡}
2017	Jamaica U15	1	(0)
2019	Jamaica U17	4	(0)
2022–	Jamaica	9	(0)
- * Club domestic league appearances and goals as of 7 November 2026 ‡ National team caps and goals as of 5 October 2026

Dwayne Atkinson (born 5 May 2002) is a Jamaican footballer who plays as a forward for Rhode Island FC in the USL Championship and the Jamaica national team.

== Club career ==
Atkinson featured for Cavalier at the youth and senior levels.

On 26 April 2023, Atkinson moved to Iceland to play for ÍBV, He signed a contract until the end of 2023, with option to extend it.

Atkinson returned to Cavalier in January 2024. He marked his second JPL debut with a goal and an assist in a 3–0 victory over Arnett Gardens.

In the summer of 2025, Atkinson was transferred to Rhode Island FC in the USL Championship.

== International career ==
Atkinson was called up to the senior national against Peru.

== Career statistics ==
=== Club ===
As of 19 September 2026.

Appearances and goals by club, season and competition
Club	Season	League			Cup		Continental		Other		Total	
Club	Season	Division	Apps	Goals	Apps	Goals	Apps	Goals	Apps	Goals	Apps	Goals
Cavalier	2019–20	Jamaica Premier League	11	3	0	0	0	0	0	0	11	3
Cavalier	2021	Jamaica Premier League	10	3	0	0	0	0	3 (Note: Appearances in the Jamaica Premier League playoffs)	0	13	3
Cavalier	2022	Jamaica Premier League	20	5	2	2	0	0	5	3	27	10
Cavalier	2022–23	Jamaica Premier League	22	9	0	0	0	0	0	0	22	9
Cavalier	2023–24	Jamaica Premier League	14	5	0	0	2 (Note: Appearances in CONCACAF Champions Cup)	0	3	1	19	6
Cavalier	2024–25	Jamaica Premier League	33	13	0	0	9 (Note: Two appearances in CONCACAF Champions Cup, seven appearances and 6 goals in CONCACAF Caribbean Cup)	6	5	1	47	19
Cavalier	Total		110	38	2	2	11	6	16	5	139	50
ÍBV (loan)	2023	Besta deild karla	10	1	—		—		—		10	1
Rhode Island FC	2025	USL Championship	10	0	—		—		2 (Note: Apeparances in USL Cup)	1	12	1
Rhode Island FC	2026	USL Championship	19	3	3	0	—		3	0	25	3
Rhode Island FC	Total		29	3	3	0	—		5	1	37	4
Career total			149	42	5	2	11	6	21	6	186	55

=== International ===
As of match played 5 October 2026

National team	Year	Apps	Goals
Jamaica	2022	1	0
Jamaica	2023	2	0
Jamaica	2025	3	0
Jamaica	2026	3	0
Total		9	0

== Honours ==
=== Cavalier ===
- Jamaica Premier League: 2021, 2023–24, 2024–25
- CONCACAF Caribbean Cup: 2024

=== Individual ===
- CONCACAF Caribbean Cup Best Player: 2024
- CONCACAF Caribbean Cup Best XI: 2024
