= Jeadine White =

Jamaican footballer (born 2000)

Personal information
- Full name: Jeadine Shemar White
- Date of birth: 7 July 2000 (age 26)
- Place of birth: Kingston, Jamaica
- Height: 1.86 m (6 ft 1 in)
- Position: Goalkeeper

Team information
- Current team: Cavalier
- Number: 31

Senior career*
Years	Team	Apps	(Gls)
2016–2019	Cavalier	10	(0)
2019–2020	Humble Lions	9	(0)
2020–	Cavalier	65	(0)

International career^{‡}
2018	Jamaica U20		
2018–	Jamaica	3	(0)
- * Club domestic league appearances and goals as of 23:22, 29 December 2024 (UTC) ‡ National team caps and goals as of 12:30, 16 August 2022 (UTC)

Jeadine Shemar White (born 7 July 2000) is a Jamaican international footballer who plays for Cavalier, as a goalkeeper.

== Club career ==
Born in Kingston, White has played club football for Cavalier and Humble Lions. In 2020, White returned to Cavalier.

On 2 October 2021, White saved two penalties to help Cavalier win the National Premier League; their first league title since 1981.

== International career ==
After playing for Jamaica at under-20 level, he made his senior international debut for Jamaica in 2018.

== Coaching career ==
In 2023, White accepted a position as the goalkeeper's coach at his alma mater, St Andrew Technical High School, at the invitation of his former schoolboy coach.

== Honours ==
=== Cavalier ===
- Jamaica Premier League: 2021
