= FC Juventus des Cayes =

Haitian football club

Juventus des Cayes
- Full name: Football Club Juventus des Cayes
- Nickname: Solo
- Founded: 16 July 2006; 20 years ago
- Ground: Parc Larco
- Chairman: Franel Étienne André (President)
- Manager: Moïse Diderrot
- League: Ligue Haïtienne
- 2025: Champions
Away colours

Football Club Juventus des Cayes (commonly referred to as Juventus des Cayes) is a professional football club based in Les Cayes, Haiti.
