= Edipo Rodríguez =

Dominican Republic footballer (born 1993)

Personal information
- Full name: Edipo Antonio Rodríguez Encarnación
- Date of birth: 27 June 1993 (age 33)
- Place of birth: Barahona, Dominican Republic
- Height: 1.76 m (5 ft 9 in)
- Position: Right winger

Team information
- Current team: Cibao

Youth career
- 2006–2008: Calasanz
- 2008–2009: CIA
- 2009–2012: Numancia

Senior career*
Years	Team	Apps	(Gls)
2011–2016	Numancia B	72	(20)
2015–2016	Numancia	9	(0)
2015	→ Guadajalara (loan)	12	(0)
2016	Atlético San Cristóbal	2	(1)
2016–2017	San José	13	(7)
2017–2018	Hospitalet	28	(2)
2018	Tarazona	16	(4)
2018-2020	Almazán	57	(27)
2020–2021	Horta	12	(2)
2021	Cibao	26	(5)
2021–2023	Almazán	55	(22)
2023–2024	Palencia	33	(7)
2024–2025	Cibao	22	(2)
2025–	San José	28	(22)

International career^{‡}
2014–2019	Dominican Republic	29	(7)
- * Club domestic league appearances and goals as of 23 July 2025 ‡ National team caps and goals as of 5 June 2021

Edipo Antonio Rodríguez Encarnación (born 27 June 1993), simply known as Edipo in Spain, is a Dominican footballer who plays as a right winger for Tercera Federación club Palencia. He represented the Dominican Republic internationally. He also holds Spanish citizenship.

== Club career ==
Born in Barahona, Edipo moved to Soria in 1999, aged six, and started playing for lowly CD Calasanz five years later. In March 2008 he went on a trial at Real Valladolid, but nothing came of it.

In the 2009 summer Edipo joined CD Numancia, after a stint at Club Internacional de la Amistad. In 2011, he made his senior debuts, appearing for the former's reserve team in Tercera División.

On 15 February 2015 Edipo played his first match as a professional, coming on as a second half substitute for Mickaël Gaffoor in a 2–1 away win against SD Ponferradina in the Segunda División championship. On 11 July he was loaned to Segunda División B side CD Guadalajara, in a season-long deal.

In May 2016, after being sparingly used by Guadalajara, Edipo joined Club Atlético San Cristóbal in his homeland. He rescinded his link in August, and returned to Spain in October after signing for CD San José in the fourth tier.

On 16 January 2017, Edipo moved to CE L'Hospitalet in the third division.

== International career ==
On 18 August 2014 Edipo was called up to Dominican Republic national team for a friendly against El Salvador. He made his international debut late in the month, starting in a 0–2 loss.

=== International goals ===
Scores and results list Dominican Republic's goal tally first.

No	Date	Venue	Opponent	Score	Result	Competition
1.	26 March 2016	Ergilio Hato Stadium, Willemstad, Curaçao	Curaçao	1–1	1–2	2017 Caribbean Cup qualification
2.	28 August 2016	Estadio Panamericano, San Cristobal, Dominican Republic	Puerto Rico	1–0	5–0	Friendly
3.	8 November 2017	Estadio Cacique Diriangén, Diriamba, Nicaragua	Nicaragua	1–0	3–0	Friendly
4.	8 November 2017	Estadio Cacique Diriangén, Diriamba, Nicaragua	Nicaragua	3–0	3–0	Friendly
5.	11 November 2017	Estadio Panamericano, San Cristóbal, Dominican Republic	Nicaragua	1–0	1–0	Friendly
6.	12 October 2018	Estadio Cibao, Santiago de los Caballeros, Dominican Republic	Cayman Islands	2–0	3–0	2019–20 CONCACAF Nations League qualification
