= Rivaldo Correa =

Colombian footballer (born 1999)

Personal information
- Full name: Rivaldo Antonio Correa Barbosa
- Date of birth: 7 September 1999 (age 27)
- Place of birth: Santa Marta, Colombia
- Height: 1.85 m (6 ft 1 in)
- Position: Forward

Team information
- Current team: Panserraikos
- Number: 7

Senior career*
Years	Team	Apps	(Gls)
2017	Rionegro Águilas	10	(1)
2018	Independiente Medellín	9	(0)
2019	Cortuluá	23	(5)
2019–2021	Leones	4	(2)
2021–2022	Panserraikos	0	(0)
2023	Comerciantes	24	(4)
2024-	Cibao FC	43	(30)

International career^{‡}
2019	Colombia U20	7	(0)
- * Club domestic league appearances and goals as of 21:33, 10 June 2020 (UTC) ‡ National team caps and goals as of 12:04, 31 May 2019 (UTC)

Rivaldo Antonio Correa Barbosa (born 7 September 1999) is a Colombian professional footballer who plays as a forward for Greek Super League 2 club Panserraikos.
