= Cavalier F.C. =

Association football club in Jamaica

- Full name: Cavalier Football Club
- Founded: 1 August 1962; 64 years ago
- Ground: Stadium East Field; Kingston, Jamaica
- Capacity: 3,000
- Chairman: Ryan Foster
- Manager: Rudolph Speid
- League: Jamaica Premier League
- 2024–25: Regular season: 4th Playoffs: Winners
Home colours

Cavalier Football Club is a Jamaican professional football club based in the community of Mountain View in Kingston, which currently plays in the Jamaica Premier League.

The team's home ground is the 3,000-capacity Stadium East Field.

== History ==
Cavalier were founded on 1 August 1962, by the late Leighton Duncan and were then also known as the Duncan Destroyers. They won the Jamaica Premier League title 4 times (1981, 2021, 2023–24 and 2024–25) and the CONCACAF Caribbean Cup once (2024). The club is known for producing top quality youth teams and has won over 40 domestic titles at various levels.

In 1971 the club hosted an invitational mid-season tournament called Torneio Triangular Kingston, inviting English club Chelsea and Brazilian club Santos. Cavalier faced Santos and the late legendary forward Pele on 31 January 1971 at the National Stadium in front of a sold out crowd of 30,000 spectators. Pele was gifted the key to the city by then Mayor of Kingston Councillor Emerson Barrett prior to the start of the game.

=== Recent seasons ===
After facing relegation in 1995, the club returned to the Jamaica Premier League in 2012, ending a 17-year hiatus and finished the season in mid-table.

The club has since regain its status as a historic club in Jamaica’s top division and has particularly grown in dominance following the cancelled COVID-19 season. They won the league upon its return in 2021, were runners-up in 2022–23 and champions again in 2023–24. They have also garnered prominence on the regional stage, featuring in the CONCACAF Caribbean Cup finals on the first two occasions since the competition’s inception. They finished runners-up 2023 and were champions in 2024.

== Players ==
=== Current squad ===
As of 29 November 2024

Note: Flags indicate national team as defined under FIFA eligibility rules; some limited exceptions apply. Players may hold more than one non-FIFA nationality.

No.	Pos.	Nation	Player
1	GK	LCA	Vino Barclett
4	DF	JAM	Shamar Watson
6	DF	JAM	Jeovanni Laing
7	FW	JAM	Jalmaro Calvin
8	MF	JAM	Adrian Reid Jr.
9	FW	TTO	Kaile Auvray
10	MF	JAM	Dwayne Atkinson
11	FW	JAM	Christopher Ainsworth
13	MF	JAM	Dwayne Allen
15		JAM	Oneil Bryan
16	FW	JAM	Orlando Russell
18	DF	JAM	Dahmani Miller
19	MF	JAM	Chad James
21	MF	JAM	Jaheem Frazer
22	DF	JAM	Jloyd Smith
23	DF	JAM	Kwayne Thompson
25	FW	SUR	Jamilhio Rigters
26		JAM	Odane Wilberforce
27	MF	JAM	Jerome Mcleary
28	DF	JAM	Matthew Ellis
29		JAM	Johni Morgan
30	DF	JAM	Alexavier Gooden

No.	Pos.	Nation	Player
31	GK	JAM	Jeadine White
33	FW	SUR	Shaquille Stein
50	GK	JAM	Jamari Gordon
—	DF	SUR	Zerguinho Deira
—	MF	JAM	Ronaldo Barrett
—	FW	SUR	Riquelme Antomoi
—		JAM	Keyanni Jackson
—		JAM	Omari Grant
—		JAM	Jamoy Dennis
—		JAM	Kirk King
—		JAM	Simion Henry
—		JAM	Dashawn Jacques
—		JAM	Damarley Williams
—		JAM	Jordan Reddison
—		JAM	Maalick Whyte
—		JAM	Deshawn Talbert
—		JAM	Rojawn Small
—		JAM	Joaquin Bryan
—		JAM	Darren Donaie

=== Notable former players ===
- Alex Marshall
- Neville Oxford
- Kaheem Parris
- Calvin Stewart
- Art Welch
- Asher Welch

== Club staff ==
Position	Name
Chairman	(Jamaica) Ryan Foster
Manager	(Jamaica) Rudolph Speid
Assistant Manager	(Jamaica) Keziah Garling
First-Team Coach	(Jamaica) Windall Marshall
Goalkeeper Coach	(Jamaica) Clinton Gibbs
Fitness Coach	(Jamaica) Flavius Portmore
Video Analyst	(Jamaica) Leandrus Kimble
Trainer	(Jamaica) Juninio Harrington
Club Doctor	(Jamaica) Devon Cornelius
Physiotherapist	(Jamaica) Moses Wilkerson
Massage Therapist	(Jamaica) Khaleefa Christopher
Equipment Manager	(Jamaica) Keith Dunkirk
Kitman	(Jamaica) Williot Collins

== Honors ==
=== Domestic ===
- Jamaica Premier League:
  - Champions (4): 1980–81, 2021, 2023–24, 2024–25
  - Runners-up (4): 1975–76, 1976–77, 1979–80, 2022–23

=== International ===
- CONCACAF Caribbean Cup
  - Champions (1): 2024
  - Runners-up (1): 2023

=== Doubles ===
- League & Caribbean Cup: 2024

== Achievements ==
=== Youth team ===
==== International ====
- 2019
  - Cayman U15 Invitational Champion
  - Sweden-World Youth Cup-Gothia Cup-2nd round qualifier
  - Mexico U15 Copa Celta – beat top Mexican club Atlas in prelims
- 2018
  - Sweden-World Youth Cup – Gothia Cup Tipselit – B Final - 2nd Place
  - Cayman U13 Invitational - 2nd Place
- 2017
  - Cayman U15 Invitational - 3rd Place
- 2016
  - Cayman U15 Invitational - Champion

==== Domestic ====
- KSAFA Under 13
  - 2018-KSAFA KO Champ
  - 2015-KSAFA Champion
  - 2014-KSAFA Champion
  - 2013-KSAFA Champion
  - 2012-KSAFA Champion
  - 2011-KSAFA Champion
  - 2010-KSAFA Runner-Up
  - 2009-KS AFA Champion
- Under 15
  - 2019-KSAFA Champion
  - 2018-KSAFA Champion
  - 2015 - KSAFA Champion
  - 2013-KSAFA 2nd Place
  - 2010-KSAFA Champion
  - 2009-KSAFA Champion
  - 2008-KSAFA Champion
- Under 17
  - 2019-KSAFA U17 Runner-Up
  - 2018-KSAFA-U17 Runner-Up
  - 2017-KSAFA Champion
  - 2015-KSAFA Champion
  - 2013-KSAFA Champion
  - 2011-KSAFA Champion
  - 2010-KSAFA – Champion
- KSAFA Under 20
  - 2015-KSAFA-3rd Place

=== Players on the Jamaica teams ===
The Jamaica U17 team that qualified for the 2011 world had 8 players from the Cavalier Soccer Club in the squad. All 8 players played against France in a 1–1 tie at the World Cup which is a record achievement from any club in the world.

- Jamaica U17: 2011
  - Jason Wright, Patrick Palmer, Romario Williams, Romario Jones, Oshane Jenkins, Nico Campbell, Zhelano Barnes, Andre Lewis
- Jamaica U17: 2012
  - Ryan Miller, Jahmarley Thomas, Alando Brown, Courtney Dowdie
- Jamaica U20: 2013
  - Romario Jones, Mark Brown, Nico Campbell, David Mitchell, Tavares Thompson, Zhelano Barnes
- Jamaica U15:2013
  - Krishna Clarke, Jevaughn McKellar, Justin McMaster
- Jamaica U17: 2014
  - Alex Marshall, Hakim Williams, Ajeanie Talbott, Jahwanni Hinds
- Jamaica U21: 2014
  - Chevonne Marsh, Oshane Jenkins, David Mitchell
- Jamaica U17: 2016
  - Kaheem Parris, Jahmoi Topey, Nickache Murray, Omar Thompson, Jeadine White, Javon Francis, Nicque Daley
- Jamaica U15: 2017
  - Dwayne Atkinson, Isaac Scott, Dwayne Allen, Khalifah Richards, Okeefe Cunningham, Tyrese Durrant
- Jamaica U20: 2019
  - Kaheem Parris, Nicque Daley, Tevin Rochester, Jamoi Topey, Jeadine White, Clifton Woodbine
- Jamaica U17:2019
  - Dwayne Atkinson, Isaac Scott, Hassani Barnes, Rajay Wright, Dandre Miller
- Jamaica U23
  - Alex Marshall, Nicque Daley, Jamoi Topey, Sheldon Mckoy
- Jamaica Senior Team
  - Chevonne Marsh, Alex Marshall, Kaheem Parris, Jamoi Topey, Jeadine White

=== Individual achievements ===
- 2019
  - Kaheem Parris signed to NK Domzale-Europe Slovenia – Priva Liga
  - Jamoi Topey signed to Philadelphia Union=USA-USL League
  - Nicque Daley signed to Charleston Battery-USA-USL League
  - Rojay Nelson-invited to Philadelphia Union Academy USA
  - Jhamar Brown-leading goalscorer Cayman U15 Invitational
  - Xavier Codlin-MVP Cayman U15 invitational
- 2018
  - Christopher Ainsworth and Nathaniel Brooks sent to Barcelona Spain to train
  - Christopher Ainsworth-MVP KSAFA U13 KO
  - Jhamar Brown-leading goalscorer Cayman U13 invitational
- 2017
  - Kaheem Parris became the youngest ever senior international for Jamaica.
  - Chevonne Marsh and Alex Marshall made their debut as Senior Jamaica team players.
  - Jeadine White goalkeeper at 16 led Cavalier to Premier league promotion
  - Dwayne Atkinson was named to the Concacaf All Star U15 team
- 2016
  - Chevonne Marsh-Kokkolan Palloveik – Finland Div 2
  - Cavalier becomes the only KSAFA team to win the U13, U15, U17 titles in the same year
  - Kemali Green recruited to Philadelphis Union Academy USA
  - Cavalier beat Tottenham Hotspur(UK) in the finals of the Cayman U14 Invitational
- 2015
  - Chevonne Marsh-Ventura Fusion-USA-USL league 2
  - KSAFA U 20 leading goalscorer-Nicholas Hamilton
  - KSAFA U17 leading goalscorer Alex Marshall
  - KSAFA U17 MVP-Alex Marshall
  - KSAFA U15 leading goalscorer-Michael Allen
  - KSAFA U15 MVP-Jeadine White
  - KSAFA U13 leading goalscorer-Revaldo Mitchell
  - KSAFA U13 MVP –Dwayne Atkinson
- 2014
  - Caribbean Football Union U17 MVP-Alex Marshall Cavalier
  - Philadelphia Union MLS recruited Ryan Miller Cavalier into their academy
  - JFF appoints Cavalier coaches-Lamar Morgan &Toni Cowan to the Jamaica U15
  - KSAFA U13 MVP-Michael Allen
  - KSAFA U13 leading goalscorer-Michael Allen
  - Digicel Kick start player-Alex Marshall
  - Cavalier became the 2nd team to win the KSAFA U13, U15 and U17 in the same year
- 2013
  - KSAFA U13 leading goalscorer-Michael Allen
  - KSAFA U15 leading goalscorer-Tevin Rochester
  - KSAFA U17 leading goalscorer-Sheldon Mckoy
- 2012
  - Digicel Kick Start selectees-Chevon Crooks & Kevon Deacon
  - KSAFA U13 leading goalscorer-Tevin Rochester
  - KSAFA U 13 MVP Matthew Wilson
- 2011
  - Digicel Kick start selectee- Kendon Anderson
  - KSAFA U17 leading goalscorer Chevonne Marsh
  - KSAFA U17 MVP Chevonne Marsh
  - KSAFA U13 leading goalscorer Krishna Clarke
  - KSAFA U13 MVP Clyde Ottey
- 2010
  - KSAFA U13 leading goalscorer –Sheldon Mckoy
  - KSAFA U17 MVP Conroy Johnson
  - KSAFA U17 leading goalscorer-Michaelous Martin
- 2009
  - Real MADRID Academy had Jason Wright and Patrick Palmer
  - KSAFA U15 MVP Patrick Palmer
  - KSAFA U13 MVP Jordan James
- 2008
  - KSAFA U15 MVP Conroy Johnson

=== Cavalier achievements senior ===
- 2011–2012
  - Qualified for the National Premier League
- 2010
  - Won KSAFA Super League; Won Under 17 Confederation (KSAFA)
  - Finalist- Jackie Bell Knockout Competition
- 2009
  - Won Under 15 Confederation League (KSAFA)
  - Won Under 13 Confederation League (KSAFA)
  - Super League Runner-up; Winner of Fair Play Award
- 2008
  - Won Under 15 Confederation League (KSAFA)
- 2006
  - Promoted to Super League
  - Runner-up Major League
- 2001
  - Finalist in Syd Bartlett League Promoted to Major League
- 1994
  - Semi-finalist in National Premier League
- 1993
  - Published "Call of the Ball’" as part of 30th anniversary celebrations
- 1992
  - Third in National Premier League
- 1989
  - Third in President’s Cup Finalist in Parish Knockout Competition – Umoja
- 1988
  - Fourth in National Premier League
- 1986
  - Finalist in Parish League
- 1985
  - Third in National Premier League Fourth in President’s Cup
- 1984
  - Third in National Premier League
- 1983
- Finalist in Parish League Cavalier; Top Goal Scorer of Competition
- 1980
  - Finalist in Parish League – Major League (competition abandoned)
  - Won National Club League
- 1979
  - Second in National Club League
  - Finalist in Parish League
  - Major League Finalist in Parish Knockout Competition – Umoja
  - Founder of Cavalier awarded National Honour – Order of Distinction
- 1978
  - Won Parish League – Major League
  - Joint Winners JFF Knockout Competition – President’s Cup
- 1977
  - Won Parish Knockout Competition – Umoja Cup
- 1976
  - Second in National Club League
- 1975
  - Second in National Club League
- 1974
  - Won Parish League – Major League
- 1973
  - Did not participate in Parish League
- 1972
  - Won National Knockout Competition – Ovaltine
  - Did not participate in Parish League
- 1971
  - Host to Santos of Brazil and Chelsea of England Cavalier International XI commemoration of Santos-Chelsea Tournament
  - Won Parish Division I Championship – Arthur McKenzie Cup.
  - Won Juvenile All-Island Knockout Championship – Alcan Trophy
- 1969
  - Track and Field athletic section of Club established.
  - Promoted initial Annual Athletic Meet for schoolgirls
- 1968
  - Hosts of Detroit Cougars Soccer Club of the North American League.
  - Cavalier squad toured Haiti.
- 1967
  - Won Juvenile All-Island Knockout Championship – Alcan Trophy
  - Won Homelectrix Knockout Championship
  - Cavalier player voted "Most Outstanding Player" in Homelectrix Tournament
- 1966
  - Won Booker Challenge Trophy
  - Cavalier Squad toured Bermuda
  - Cavalier Coaching School established, in conjunction with JFF, conducted Coaching Clinic for coaches.
- 1965
  - Won Division I Championship – Arthur McKenzie Cup
  - Cavalier Player awarded "Player of the Year" award – Diamond Soccer Awards
  - Cavalier Player awarded "Most Improved Player" award.
- 1964
  - Won All-Island Knockout Championship – Ovaltine Trophy
  - Cavalier Coach awarded "Coach of the Year" award – Diamond Soccer Award
- 1963
  - Won "Most Sparkling Team" award – Diamond Soccer Awards
- 1962
  - Won Division II and Junior Knockout Championships – unbeaten
