= CONCACAF Caribbean Cup =

- Organiser(s): CFU; CONCACAF
- Founded: 2021; 5 years ago
- Region: Caribbean
- Teams: 10
- Qualifier for: CONCACAF Champions Cup
- Related competitions: CFU Club Shield; CONCACAF Central American Cup; Leagues Cup
- Current champions: (Jamaica) Mount Pleasant (1st title)
- Most championships: (Jamaica) Mount Pleasant (Jamaica) Cavalier (Suriname) Robinhood (1 title each)
- Broadcaster: CONCACAF (YouTube)
- 2026 CONCACAF Caribbean Cup

The CONCACAF Caribbean Cup is an international association football competition organized by CONCACAF as its top regional tournament for clubs from the Caribbean. Beginning with the inaugural edition in 2023, the new competition serves as a qualification method for the CONCACAF Champions Cup. It is the successor of the Caribbean Club Championship which ran from 1997 to 2022.

The top three clubs from the Caribbean Cup qualify for the Champions Cup, with the winner entering the round of 16 and second and third-place finishers entering in round one.

== History ==
In September 2021, CONCACAF announced that beginning in 2024, the CONCACAF Champions League would be expanded from 16 to 27 clubs. At that time, it was announced that clubs from the Caribbean sub-region would qualify via the new CONCACAF Caribbean Cup, but specific details were not revealed. Further details were announced in June 2022.

== Qualification ==
Eight of the ten competing clubs will be the current title-holders and runners-up of the five leagues in the region which meet CONCACAF's professional licensing standards. For the 2023–24 competition cycle, Haiti's berths have been re-allotted to the Dominican Republic and Jamaica. For the 2025 edition, Suriname will have a berth to the tournament, while Haiti will be reduced to one berth.

Nation	League	Participants
Dominican Republic	Liga Dominicana de Fútbol	Winner and runner-up
Haiti	Ligue Haïtienne	Winner
Jamaica	Jamaica Premier League	Winner and runner-up
Suriname	Suriname Major League	Winner
Trinidad and Tobago	TT Premier Football League	Winner and runner-up
Varies	CFU Club Shield	Winner and runner-up

== Competition format ==
The ten participating clubs are divided into two groups of five. The clubs play a round-robin style tournament within their group, two home and two away games. The top two clubs from each group play knockout rounds to determine final positions and, therefore, the round they enter the CONCACAF Champions Cup.

== Results ==
Year	Champions	Results	Runners-up	Third place	Results	Fourth place
2023	(Suriname) Robinhood	1–0; 2–0	(Jamaica) Cavalier	(Dominican Republic) Moca	2–1; 1–1	(Jamaica) Harbour View
2024	(Jamaica) Cavalier	1–0; 1–2 (away goals)	(Dominican Republic) Cibao	(Haiti) Real Hope	1–0; 3–2	(Dominican Republic) Moca
2025	(Jamaica) Mount Pleasant	1–0; 2–2	(Dominican Republic) O&M	(Trinidad and Tobago) Defence Force	3–0; 2–1	(Dominican Republic) Cibao

== Performances ==
Performance by club
Club	Titles	Runners-up	Years won	Years runners-up
(Jamaica) Cavalier	1	1	2024	2023
(Suriname) Robinhood	1	0	2023	–
(Jamaica) Mount Pleasant	1	0	2025	–
(Dominican Republic) Cibao	0	1	–	2024
(Dominican Republic) O&M	0	1	–	2025

Performance by nation
Nation	Titles	Runners-up	Total
Jamaica	2	1	3
Suriname	1	0	1
Dominican Republic	0	2	2

== See also ==
- CONCACAF Central American Cup
- CONCACAF Champions Cup
- CONCACAF League
- Leagues Cup
