= 2013 CONCACAF U-17 Championship qualifying =

The 2013 CONCACAF U-17 Championship qualification tournaments took place in 2012 to qualify national teams for the 2013 CONCACAF U-17 Championship.

== Caribbean Zone ==
=== First round ===
==== Group 1 ====
Team	Pld	W	D	L	GF	GA	GD	Pts
Jamaica	2	2	0	0	9	0	+9	6
Bermuda	2	1	0	1	2	6	−4	3
Antigua and Barbuda	2	0	0	2	1	6	−5	0

At Kingston, Jamaica

11 July 2012

Jamaica	5–0	Bermuda
Hyde 16', 28', 60'; Flemmings 51'; Seaton 70'	Report

Waterhouse Stadium
Attendance: 100
Referee: Christophel Stewart (Cayman Islands)
13 July 2012

Bermuda	2–1	Antigua and Barbuda
Burrows 14', 68'	Report	Stevens 53'

Waterhouse Stadium
Attendance: 100
Referee: Kenville Holder (Cayman Islands)

15 July 2012

Jamaica	4–0	Antigua and Barbuda
Currie 10'; Flemmings 17', 20'; Seaton 44'	Report

Waterhouse Stadium
Attendance: 1,000
Referee: Christophel Stewart (Cayman Islands)

==== Group 2 ====
Team	Pld	W	D	L	GF	GA	GD	Pts
Cuba	3	3	0	0	15	0	+15	9
Puerto Rico	3	1	1	1	4	3	+1	4
Aruba	3	0	2	1	4	11	−7	2
Bahamas	3	0	1	2	3	12	−9	1

At Havana, Cuba

5 July 2012

Aruba	1–1	Puerto Rico
Dubero 5'	Report	Cerra 79'

Estadio Pedro Marrero
Attendance: 100
Referee: Walner Laventure (Haiti)
5 July 2012

Cuba	6–0	Bahamas
Valdés 11', 69'; Samonte 14'; Arancibia 30', 43'; Guerra 87'	Report

Estadio Pedro Marrero
Attendance: 100
Referee: Dwight Royal (Jamaica)

7 July 2012

Puerto Rico	3–0	Bahamas
Betancourt 41', 73'; Calderon 81'	Report

Estadio Pedro Marrero
Attendance: 100
Referee: Sherwin Johnson (Guyana)
7 July 2012

Cuba	7–0	Aruba
Valdés 25', 42'; Adao 36'; Godinez 61'; Samonte 68'; Arancibia 71'; Guerra 72'	Report

Estadio Pedro Marrero
Attendance: 200
Referee: Javier Jauregui (Curaçao)

9 July 2012

Aruba	3–3	Bahamas
van der Biezen 20'; Trinidad 60', 67'	report	Williamson 18', 40'; Collie 81'

Estadio Pedro Marrero
Attendance: 150
Referee: Dwight Royal (Jamaica)
9 July 2012

Cuba	2–0	Puerto Rico
Samonte 22', 60'	Report

Estadio Pedro Marrero
Attendance: 150
Referee: Javier Jauregui (Curaçao)

==== Group 3 ====
Team	Pld	W	D	L	GF	GA	GD	Pts
Haiti	3	3	0	0	10	2	+8	9
Curaçao	3	1	1	1	7	7	0	4
Dominican Republic	3	1	1	1	6	7	−1	4
Saint Lucia	3	0	0	3	3	10	−7	0

At Port-au-Prince, Haiti

5 July 2012

Dominican Republic	2–2	Curaçao
Quesada 6'; Martinez 70'	Report	Valerius 30'; Fortin 38'

Stade Sylvio Cator
Attendance: 1,200
Referee: David Rubalcaba (Cuba)
5 July 2012

Haiti	3–0	Saint Lucia
Desire 28', 66'; Derival 77'	Report

Stade Sylvio Cator
Attendance: 6,000
Referee: Irving Pierau (Surinam)

7 July 2012

Saint Lucia	2–3	Dominican Republic
Meril 43'; Henry 57'	Report	Diaz 6'; Mateo 25'; Puello 73'

Stade Sylvio Cator
Attendance: 6,500
Referee: Trevor Taylor (Barbados)
7 July 2012

Haiti	4–1	Curaçao
Derival 6'; Desire 45', 58', 78'	Report	Fortin 3'

Stade Sylvio Cator
Attendance: 6,500
Referee: Wilson da Costa (Bahamas)

9 July 2012

Curaçao	4–1	Saint Lucia
Gerard 5'; Clements 39'; Fortin 78', 80'	Report	O Brian 18'

Stade Sylvio Cator
Referee: Wilson da Costa (Bahamas)
9 July 2012

Haiti	3–1	Dominican Republic
Derival 16', 75'; Phillippe 66'	Report	Quezada 80'

Stade Sylvio Cator
Attendance: 2,000
Referee: David Rubalcaba (Cuba)

==== Group 4 ====
Team	Pld	W	D	L	GF	GA	GD	Pts
Trinidad and Tobago	3	3	0	0	28	1	+27	9
Suriname	3	2	0	1	22	4	+18	6
Guyana	3	1	0	2	14	5	+9	3
British Virgin Islands	3	0	0	3	0	54	−54	0

At Trinidad & Tobago

24 July 2012

Guyana	1–3	Suriname
Parks 24'	Report	Gainsa 16'; Fer 76'; Asoman 85'

Hasely Crawford Stadium
Attendance: 200
Referee: Sandy Vasquez (Dominican Republic)
24 July 2012

Trinidad and Tobago	23–0	British Virgin Islands
Fortune 10'; Mitchell 13', 19', 43', 50'; Sam 23', 29', 38', 54', 60', 70', 71'; Seecharan 31', 41'; Garcia 36'; Creed 48', 76'; Watson 84'	Report

Hasely Crawford Stadium
Attendance: 200
Referee: Valdin Legister (Jamaica)

26 July 2012

British Virgin Islands	0–13	Guyana
	Report	Knights 7', 76'; Fletcher 23' 26', 28', 59'; Wronge 30'; Parks 34' 49', 68', 87', 89'; Enoe 38'

Ato Boldon Stadium
Attendance: 60
Referee: Canaan St Catherine (St Lucia)
26 July 2012

Trinidad and Tobago	3–1	Suriname
Seecharan 27'; Garcia 38'; Mitchell 47'	Report	Khoenkhoen 32'

Ato Boldon Stadium
Attendance: 656
Referee: Junior Andujar (Dominican Republic)

28 July 2012

Suriname	18–0	British Virgin Islands
Doesberg 2', 40'; Everd 11'; Asoman 21', 32', 33', 76'; Gainsa 28', 43', 66', 81', 83'; Zandveld 45', 60', 88'; Juliaans 72', 90'; Aroeman 80'	Report

Hasely Crawford Stadium
Attendance: 110
Referee: Junior Andujar (Dominican Republic)
29 July 2012

Trinidad and Tobago	2–0	Guyana
Trimmingham 22'; Creed 71'	Report

Hasely Crawford Stadium
Attendance: 864
Referee: Valdin Legister (Jamaica)

==== Group 5 ====
Team	Pld	W	D	L	GF	GA	GD	Pts
Barbados	2	2	0	0	7	2	+5	6
Saint Kitts and Nevis	2	1	0	1	5	3	+2	3
U.S. Virgin Islands	2	0	0	2	1	8	−7	0

At Basseterre, St. Kitts. Grenada were also drawn into this group but later withdrew.

30 July 2012

Saint Kitts and Nevis	4–0	U.S. Virgin Islands
Nelson 5', 10'; McKoy 20'; Barnes 75'	Report

Warner Park Football Stadium
Attendance: 270
Referee: Caswell Cambridge (St Vincent & Grenadines)
1 August 2012

Barbados	4–1	U.S. Virgin Islands
Davis 15'; Belle 62', 73'; O Brian 74'	Report	Castro 40'

Warner Park Football Stadium
Attendance: 270
Referee: Marcos Brea Despaigne (Cuba)
3 August 2012

Saint Kitts and Nevis	1–3	Barbados
Warner 79'	Report	Boyce 4', 55', 90'

Warner Park Football Stadium
Attendance: 450
Referee: Kevin Thomas (Jamaica)

== Central American Zone ==
Guatemala hosted the qualifying tournament, matches took place between 7–15 December. Panama qualified automatically as the host of the final tournament, whereas Belize opted not to participate in the qualifiers.

Team	Pld	W	D	L	GF	GA	GD	Pts	Qualification
Honduras	4	3	1	0	13	3	+10	10	2013 CONCACAF U-17 Championship
Costa Rica	4	2	1	1	4	4	0	7	2013 CONCACAF U-17 Championship
Guatemala (H)	4	1	2	1	4	5	−1	5	2013 CONCACAF U-17 Championship
El Salvador	4	1	0	3	8	12	−4	3	
Nicaragua	4	0	2	2	2	7	−5	2	

Source: Soccerway
(H) Hosts
7 December 2012
18:00

El Salvador	2–5	Honduras
Amaya 23'; Jacobo 72'	Report	Velásquez 5', 61'; García 45+1'; Elis 66'; Bodden 82'

Estadio Julio Armando Cobar, San Miguel Petapa
Referee: Henry Bejarano (Costa Rica)
7 December 2012
22:00

Guatemala	0–0	Nicaragua
	Report

Estadio Julio Armando Cobar, San Miguel Petapa
Referee: John Pitti (Panama)

9 December 2012
18:00

Honduras	3–0	Costa Rica
Elis 50', 74', 78'	Report

Estadio Julio Armando Cobar, San Miguel Petapa
Referee: Óscar Reyna (Guatemala)
9 December 2012
22:00

Guatemala	3–2	El Salvador
Ortiz 28', 52', 89'	Report	Barahona 58'; O. Hernandez 73'

Estadio Julio Armando Cobar, San Miguel Petapa
Referee: Raúl Castro (Honduras)

11 December 2012
18:00

Nicaragua	0–4	Honduras
	Report	García 51' (pen.), 88'; Ramos 67'; Bodden 75'

Estadio Julio Armando Cobar, San Miguel Petapa
Referee: Fidel Paiz (El Salvador)
11 December 2012
22:00

El Salvador	1–2	Costa Rica
Acevedo 61'	Report	Rivera 84' (pen.); Burke 87'

Estadio Julio Armando Cobar, San Miguel Petapa
Referee: John Pitti (Panama)

13 December 2012
18:00

Costa Rica	0–0	Nicaragua
	Report

Estadio Julio Armando Cobar, San Miguel Petapa
Referee: Raúl Castro (Honduras)
13 December 2012
22:00

Guatemala	1–1	Honduras
Samayoa 32'	Report	Santos 65'

Estadio Julio Armando Cobar, San Miguel Petapa
Referee: Henry Bejarano (Costa Rica)

15 December 2012
18:00

Nicaragua	2–3	El Salvador
Bonilla 12', 75'	Report	Amaya 24'; Barahona 45'; Luna 69'

Estadio Julio Armando Cobar, San Miguel Petapa
Referee: Óscar Reyna (Guatemala)
15 December 2012
22:00

Guatemala	0–2	Costa Rica
	Report	Burke 17'; Leal 45+2'

Estadio Julio Armando Cobar, San Miguel Petapa
Referee: John Pitti (Panama)
