= Puerto Rico national under-17 football team =

Association football team in Puerto Rico

Puerto Rico U17
- Nickname(s): El Huracán Azul (The Blue Hurricane); Los Boricuas (The Boricuas)
- Association: Federación Puertorriqueña de Fútbol (FPF)
- Confederation: CONCACAF (North America)
- Sub-confederation: CFU (Caribbean)
- Head coach: Pablo Almagro
- Home stadium: Estadio Juan Ramón Loubriel
- FIFA code: PUR
First colors	Second colors

First international
- Honduras 1–0 Puerto Rico (Port of Spain, Trinidad and Tobago; August 28, 1983)

Biggest win
- Puerto Rico 16–0 U.S. Virgin Islands (August 31, 2022)

Biggest defeat
- Mexico 8–0 Puerto Rico (Port of Spain, Trinidad and Tobago; August 30, 1983)

CONCACAF Under-17 Championship
- Appearances: 4 (first in 1983)
- Best result: Quarter-finals (2023)

FIFA U-17 World Cup
- Appearances: 0

The Puerto Rico national under-17 football team represents Puerto Rico in tournaments at the under-17 level. It is controlled by the Puerto Rican Football Federation.

== History ==
Puerto Rico made its debut at the 1983 CONCACAF Championship where they faced Honduras and México. Subsequently, they played in the FIFA U-17 World Cup qualifiers in 1991, 2000 and 2002. It wasn't until 2006 where they got their first two victories against Anguilla and Saint Lucia.

Since 2012 they have participated in every World Cup qualification. In 2012 the team was managed by Jeaustin Campos where they played in Cuba the first round of the qualification where they faced the hosts, Aruba and Bahamas but failing to advance to the next round.

In 2014 they went to Bahamas this time managed by Vítor Hugo Barros where they earned a win against Bahamas but failed to advance after losing 2–0 against Martinique and drawing scoreless to Bermudas.

Steven Estrada managed the team in 2016 with a very limited time to prepare. They lost all the matches against Haiti, Cayman Islands and Aruba, scoring only one goal.

Marco Vélez took charge of the U-17 in 2019. After a successful first round, the team reached the Round of 16 of the Concacaf Championship where they lost 2–1 against Mexico.

The team returned in 2022 with Pablo Almagro a head coach. Puerto Rico advanced as group leaders through the qualifying round with 25 goals scored and none conceded. They managed to get a historic result defeating Costa Rica in the Round of 16 of the 2023 Concacaf U-17 Championship.

== Fixtures and recent results ==
The following is a list of match results from the previous 12 months, as well as any future matches that have been scheduled.

Win Draw Loss

== Players ==
=== Current squad ===
The following 21 players were selected for the most recent fixtures in the 2026 CONCACAF U-17 World Cup qualification.

No.	Pos.	Player	Date of birth (age)	Club
1	GK	Maximilian Linse	9 July 2009 (age 17)	(Puerto Rican Football Federation) Bayamón FC
18	GK	Daniel Valle	7 May 2010 (age 16)	(United States Soccer Federation) TSF Academy
21	GK	Jomar Rodríguez	3 October 2009 (age 17)	(Royal Spanish Football Federation) Levante UD Academy
4	DF	Armando Montalván	3 February 2009 (age 17)	(Puerto Rican Football Federation) Bayamón FC
13	DF	Benjamín Harris	15 June 2009 (age 17)	(United States Soccer Federation) Metropolitan Oval Academy
16	DF	André Hernández	25 March 2009 (age 17)	(United States Soccer Federation) Weston FC
12	DF	Denzel Palacios	18 March 2009 (age 17)	(United States Soccer Federation) Chicago Fire FC
2	DF	Adrián Soto	5 January 2009 (age 17)	(Puerto Rican Football Federation) Academia Quintana
5	DF	Luis Moringlane	16 January 2009 (age 17)	(United States Soccer Federation) Inter Miami CF
11	DF	Marcus Nazaire	6 April 2010 (age 16)	(United States Soccer Federation) New York Red Bulls
3	MF	Jordan Interiano	24 March 2009 (age 17)	(United States Soccer Federation) Orlando City SC
6	MF	Lleyton Wadsworth	5 February 2009 (age 17)	(United States Soccer Federation) Tampa Bay United SC
9	MF	Lucas Hernández	4 January 2009 (age 17)	(United States Soccer Federation) Austin FC
20	MF	Caleb Simmons	8 May 2009 (age 17)	(United States Soccer Federation) New York Red Bulls
8	MF	Keven Medrano	16 February 2009 (age 17)	(United States Soccer Federation) Atlanta United FC
15	MF	Dereck Hernández	1 July 2009 (age 17)	(Puerto Rican Football Federation) Puerto Rico Surf SC
10	MF	Nicolás González	24 September 2009 (age 17)	(United States Soccer Federation) Cedar Stars Rush
14	FW	Diego Echevarria (captain)	10 February 2009 (age 17)	(United States Soccer Federation) FC Dallas
7	FW	Edwin Ríos	18 July 2009 (age 17)	(United States Soccer Federation) LA Galaxy
17	FW	Reignen Magsino	31 July 2009 (age 17)	(United States Soccer Federation) Real Salt Lake
19	FW	Dacian Delgado	22 February 2009 (age 17)	(United States Soccer Federation) Columbus Crew

== Competitive record ==
=== CONCACAF U-17 Championship ===
CONCACAF U-17 Championship record
Year	Result	Position	Pld	W	D	L	GF	GA
(Trinidad and Tobago) 1983	Group stage	6th of 6	2	0	0	2	0	9
(Mexico) 1985	Did not enter							
(Honduras) 1987	Did not enter							
(Trinidad and Tobago) 1988	Did not enter							
(Trinidad and Tobago) 1991	Group stage	12th of 12	3	0	0	3	0	12
(Cuba) 1992	Did not enter							
(El Salvador) 1994	Did not enter							
(Trinidad and Tobago) 1996	Did not enter							
(Jamaica) (El Salvador) 1999	Did not enter							
(United States) (Honduras) 2001	Did not qualify							
(Guatemala) (Canada) 2003	Did not qualify							
(Costa Rica) (Mexico) 2005	Did not enter							
(Honduras) (Jamaica) 2007	Did not qualify							
(Mexico) 2009	Did not enter							
(Jamaica) 2011	Did not enter							
(Panama) 2013	Did not qualify							
(Honduras) 2015	Did not qualify							
(Panama) 2017	Did not qualify							
(United States) 2019	Round of 16	9th of 20	1	0	0	1	1	2
(Guatemala) 2023	Quarter-finals	7th of 20	2	1	0	1	1	4
Total	Quarter-finals	-	8	1	0	7	2	27
