= 2022 CONCACAF U-17 Championship qualifying =

Tournament details
- Host countries: Dominican Republic; Nicaragua; United States
- Dates: August 30 – September 8, 2022
- Teams: 19 (from 1 confederation)
- Venue(s): 4 (in 3 host cities)

Tournament statistics
- Matches played: 36
- Goals scored: 146 (4.06 per match)
- Top scorer(s): (Puerto Rico) Maxim Speed (6 goals)

The qualifiers of the 2023 CONCACAF U-17 Championship took place between 30 August and 8 September 2022.

== Draw ==
The draw for the qualifying round took place on 16 June 2022.

Pot 1	Pot 2	Pot 3	Pot 4	Pot 5
Nicaragua; Dominican Republic; Bermuda; Saint Lucia	Guyana; Puerto Rico; Antigua and Barbuda; Saint Kitts and Nevis	Cayman Islands; Grenada; Aruba; Bahamas	Martinique; Saint Vincent and the Grenadines; Belize; Bonaire	Saint Martin; U.S. Virgin Islands; Dominica; Anguilla; British Virgin Islands; Turks and Caicos Islands

== Venues ==
2022 CONCACAF U-17 Championship qualifying is located in Caribbean	(United States) Bradenton		(Dominican Republic) Santo Domingo	(Nicaragua) Managua
2022 CONCACAF U-17 Championship qualifying is located in Caribbean	IMG Academy Field 1	IMG Academy Field 6	Estadio Olímpico Félix Sánchez	Estadio Nacional de Fútbol
2022 CONCACAF U-17 Championship qualifying is located in Caribbean	Capacity: 1,500	Capacity: ?	Capacity: 27,000	Capacity: 20,000

== Qualifying round ==
The winners of each group qualify for the 2023 CONCACAF U-17 Championship, where they enter the round of 16 of the knockout stage.

=== Group A ===
Pos	Team	Pld	W	D	L	GF	GA	GD	Pts	Qualification
1	Bermuda	5	4	0	1	21	3	+18	12	2023 CONCACAF U-17 Championship
2	Bonaire	5	4	0	1	11	6	+5	12	
3	Guyana	5	3	1	1	13	8	+5	10	
4	Bahamas	5	2	0	3	3	12	−9	6	
5	British Virgin Islands	5	1	1	3	4	9	−5	4	
6	Saint Martin	5	0	0	5	4	18	−14	0	

Source: CONCACAF
Rules for classification: Tie-breakers
30 August 2022

Bahamas	2–1	Saint Martin
Edgecombe 32'; Perez 63'	Report	Lake 30'

IMG Academy Field 1, Bradenton
30 August 2022

Guyana	2–4	Bonaire
Burnette 40'; Martin 52'	Report	51' (o.g.); Dishmay 58'; Michiel 70'; Piar 88'

IMG Academy Field 6, Bradenton
30 August 2022

Bermuda	4–0	British Virgin Islands
Roberts 9'; Dill 31'; J. Robinson 45+3'; Eve 75'	Report

IMG Academy Field 1, Bradenton

1 September 2022

Saint Martin	0–9	Bermuda
	Report	Deroza 10', 24', 40'; Dill 13'; P. Robinson 47'; Burgess 59'; Belboda 71', 90+4'; 84' (o.g.)

IMG Academy Field 1, Bradenton
1 September 2022

British Virgin Islands	1–2	Bonaire
Rowe 32'	Report	Michiel 8'; Piar 35'

IMG Academy Field 6, Bradenton
1 September 2022

Guyana	4–0	Bahamas
4' (o.g.); Wharton 9', 30'; Whitter 18'	Report

IMG Academy Field 1, Bradenton

3 September 2022

Bonaire	0–2	Bermuda
	Report	Roberts 51' (pen.); Fulton 55'

IMG Academy Field 1, Bradenton
3 September 2022

Guyana	3–1	Saint Martin
Martin 36'; Kissoon 69'; Wharton 76'	Report	Jeremie 8'

IMG Academy Field 6, Bradenton
3 September 2022

Bahamas	1–0	British Virgin Islands
Holcombe 33'	Report

IMG Academy Field 1, Bradenton

5 September 2022

Bermuda	4–0	Bahamas
Roberts 21'; Eve 48'; Raynor 50'; Furbert 79'	Report

IMG Academy Field 1, Bradenton
5 September 2022

British Virgin Islands	1–1	Guyana
Rowe 42'	Report	Wharton 71'

IMG Academy Field 6, Bradenton
5 September 2022

Bonaire	2–1	Saint Martin
Pineda 8'; Dishmey 88'	Report	Joe 51'

IMG Academy Field 1, Bradenton

7 September 2022

Saint Martin	1–2	British Virgin Islands
Zephir 21'	Report	Lacey 36'; Abrams 40' (pen.)

IMG Academy Field 1, Bradenton
7 September 2022

Bahamas	0–3 Awarded (w/o)	Bonaire

IMG Academy Field 6, Bradenton
7 September 2022

Bermuda	2–3	Guyana
Swan-Desilva 38'; Dill 80'	Report	Samuels 25'; Whitter 34', 69'

IMG Academy Field 1, Bradenton

=== Group B ===
Pos	Team	Pld	W	D	L	GF	GA	GD	Pts	Qualification
1	Puerto Rico	4	3	1	0	25	0	+25	10	2023 CONCACAF U-17 Championship
2	Aruba	4	3	1	0	7	1	+6	10	
3	Martinique	4	2	0	2	18	3	+15	6	
4	Anguilla	4	1	0	3	2	15	−13	3	
5	U.S. Virgin Islands	4	0	0	4	0	33	−33	0	

Source: CONCACAF
Rules for classification: Tie-breakers
31 August 2022

Aruba	2–1	Martinique
Delgado 6' (pen.); De Mey 80'	Report	Roque 71'

IMG Academy Field 1, Bradenton
31 August 2022

Puerto Rico	16–0	U.S. Virgin Islands
Vazquez 1', 20', 72'; Speed 6', 7', 13', 17', 48', 68'; 11' (o.g.); Aviles 42'; Nelson 61'; Prado 81'; Delgado 83'; Blanco 86'; Villanueva 89'	Report

IMG Academy Field 6, Bradenton

2 September 2022

Anguilla	0–8	Puerto Rico
	Report	Aviles 3', 11', 45+1'; Vazquez 8', 19'; Charles 34'; Rosario 61'; Suster 89'

IMG Academy Field 1, Bradenton
2 September 2022

U.S. Virgin Islands	0–3	Aruba
	Report	Franken 22'; Delgado 39'; Boekhoudt 85'

IMG Academy Field 6, Bradenton

4 September 2022

U.S. Virgin Islands	0–12	Martinique
	Report	Thine 34', 43'; Le Curieux-Lafayette 40' (pen.); Demonière-Leprix 48', 54', 80', 83'; Roque 58', 74', 87', 88'; (o.g.)

IMG Academy Field 1, Bradenton
4 September 2022

Aruba	2–0	Anguilla
Boekhoudt 15'; Croes 83'	Report

IMG Academy Field 6, Bradenton

6 September 2022

Anguilla	2–0	U.S. Virgin Islands
Smeins 62'; Grant 83'	Report

IMG Academy Field 1, Bradenton
6 September 2022

Martinique	0–1	Puerto Rico
	Report	Delgado 49'

IMG Academy Field 6, Bradenton

8 September 2022

Puerto Rico	0–0	Aruba
	Report

IMG Academy Field 1, Bradenton
8 September 2022

Martinique	5–0	Anguilla
Loties 8', 63'; Demonière-Leprix 30'; Vinceslas 69'; Suivant 80'	Report

IMG Academy Field 6, Bradenton

=== Group C ===
Pos	Team	Pld	W	D	L	GF	GA	GD	Pts	Qualification
1	Dominican Republic (H)	3	3	0	0	19	1	+18	9	2023 CONCACAF U-17 Championship
2	Saint Kitts and Nevis	3	2	0	1	4	5	−1	6	
3	Cayman Islands	3	1	0	2	2	7	−5	3	
4	Dominica	3	0	0	3	0	12	−12	0	

Source: CONCACAF
Rules for classification: Tie-breakers
(H) Hosts
30 August 2022

Saint Kitts and Nevis	1–0	Cayman Islands
Francis 33'	Report

Estadio Olímpico Félix Sánchez, Santo Domingo
30 August 2022

Dominican Republic	8–0	Dominica
Jackson 3', 48', 58'; Nunez 8'; Cabrera 12'; Cruz 43'; Sarante 67'; Sapeg 71'	Report

Estadio Olímpico Félix Sánchez, Santo Domingo

1 September 2022

Dominica	0–2	Saint Kitts and Nevis
	Report	Francis 34'; Bradshaw 84'

Estadio Olímpico Félix Sánchez, Santo Domingo
1 September 2022

Cayman Islands	0–6	Dominican Republic
	Report	Peralta 11', 44', 87'; Reyes 15'; Jackson 59'; Sarante 81'

Estadio Olímpico Félix Sánchez, Santo Domingo

3 September 2022

Cayman Islands	2–0	Dominica
Henry 58'; Bennett 68'	Report

Estadio Olímpico Félix Sánchez, Santo Domingo
3 September 2022

Dominican Republic	5–1	Saint Kitts and Nevis
Peralta 47'; Breton 55'; 64' (o.g.); Cruz 67'; Sapeg 80'	Report	Mills 33'

Estadio Olímpico Félix Sánchez, Santo Domingo

=== Group D ===
Pos	Team	Pld	W	D	L	GF	GA	GD	Pts	Qualification
1	Nicaragua (H)	3	3	0	0	11	0	+11	9	2023 CONCACAF U-17 Championship
2	Belize	3	1	1	1	3	4	−1	4	
3	Antigua and Barbuda	3	1	1	1	2	4	−2	4	
4	Turks and Caicos Islands	3	0	0	3	0	8	−8	0	

Source: CONCACAF
Rules for classification: Tie-breakers
(H) Hosts
31 August 2022

Antigua and Barbuda	1–1	Belize
Jarvis 31'	Report	Mena 15'

Estadio Nacional de Fútbol, Managua
31 August 2022

Nicaragua	5–0	Turks and Caicos Islands
Gutierrez 6' (pen.); Uriarte 14'; Bello 20', 34'; Parrales 51'	Report

Estadio Nacional de Fútbol, Managua

2 September 2022

Turks and Caicos Islands	0–1	Antigua and Barbuda
	Report	Jarvis 45+1'

Estadio Nacional de Fútbol, Managua
2 September 2022

Belize	0–3	Nicaragua
	Report	Cano 24'; Uriarte 56', 69'

Estadio Nacional de Fútbol, Managua

4 September 2022

Belize	2–0	Turks and Caicos Islands
Augustine 14'; Garbutt 39'	Report

Estadio Nacional de Fútbol, Managua
4 September 2022

Nicaragua	3–0	Antigua and Barbuda
Uriarte 20'; Bello 73'; Navarrete 87'	Report

Estadio Nacional de Fútbol, Managua

== Goalscorers ==
There were 146 goals scored in 36 matches, for an average of 4.06 goals per match.

6 goals

- (Puerto Rico) Maxim Speed

5 goals

- (Martinique) Mathéo Demonière-Leprix
- (Martinique) Donovan Roque
- (Puerto Rico) Jorge Vazquez

4 goals

- (Dominican Republic) Bladimil Jackson
- (Dominican Republic) Juan Peralta
- (Guyana) Bryan Wharton
- (Nicaragua) Juban Uriarte
- (Puerto Rico) Leonard Aviles Jr.

3 goals

- (Bermuda) Xahvi Deroza
- (Bermuda) Hayden Dill
- (Bermuda) Jannis Roberts
- (Guyana) Christopher Whitter
- (Nicaragua) Oliver Bello

2 goals

- (Antigua and Barbuda) Tejhano Jarvis
- (Aruba) Reangelo Boekhoudt
- (Aruba) Juan Luis Delgado
- (Bermuda) Malachai Belboda
- (Bermuda) Chance Eve
- (Bonaire) Mervin Dishmay
- (Bonaire) Freadyen Michiel
- (Bonaire) Rhiordan Piar
- (British Virgin Islands) Johnny-Jay Rowe
- (Dominican Republic) Nicolas Cruz
- (Dominican Republic) Alejandro Sapeg
- (Dominican Republic) Carlos Sarante
- (Guyana) Matrim Martin
- (Martinique) Samy Loties
- (Martinique) Noa Thine
- (Puerto Rico) Antonio Delgado
- (Saint Kitts and Nevis) Vyhonrai Francis

1 goal

- (Anguilla) Rochard Grant
- (Anguilla) Jared Smeins
- (Aruba) Juan Croes
- (Aruba) Adrien De Mey
- (Aruba) Damiano Franken
- (The Bahamas) Reuben Edgecombe
- (The Bahamas) Robert Holcombe
- (The Bahamas) Kai Perez
- (Belize) Ammad Augustine
- (Belize) Devin Garbutt
- (Belize) Jaheim Mena
- (Bermuda) Jutorre Burgess
- (Bermuda) Luke Fulton
- (Bermuda) Bakari Furbert
- (Bermuda) Quran Raynor
- (Bermuda) Jaidyn Robinson
- (Bermuda) Paris-Mitchell Robinson
- (Bermuda) Daion Swan-Desilva
- (Bonaire) Roengel Pineda
- (British Virgin Islands) Jadon Abrams
- (British Virgin Islands) Johari Lacey
- (Cayman Islands) Jahmai Bennett
- (Cayman Islands) Javon Henry
- (Dominican Republic) Lucas Breton
- (Dominican Republic) Alvaro Cabrera
- (Dominican Republic) Josue Nunez
- (Dominican Republic) Francisco Reyes
- (Guyana) Gerry Burnette
- (Guyana) Noah Kissoon
- (Guyana) Shemaiah Samuels
- (Martinique) Noah Le Curieux-Lafayette
- (Martinique) Théo Suivant
- (Martinique) Yan Vinceslas
- (Nicaragua) Felix Cano
- (Nicaragua) Joab Gutierrez
- (Nicaragua) Oscar Navarrete
- (Nicaragua) Fernando Parrales
- (Puerto Rico) Justin Blanco
- (Puerto Rico) Ian Charles
- (Puerto Rico) Abraham Nelson
- (Puerto Rico) Adrian Prado
- (Puerto Rico) Adrian Rosario
- (Puerto Rico) Eric Suster
- (Puerto Rico) Marcos Villanueva
- (Saint Kitts and Nevis) Josiah Bradshaw
- (Saint Kitts and Nevis) Devauhn Mills
- (Collectivity of Saint Martin) Adrien Jeremie
- (Collectivity of Saint Martin) Jaheem Joe
- (Collectivity of Saint Martin) Jaheim Lake
- (Collectivity of Saint Martin) David Zephir

1 own goal

- (The Bahamas) Unknown player (against Guyana)
- (Guyana) Unknown player (against Bonaire)
- (Saint Kitts and Nevis) Unknown player (against Dominican Republic)
- (Collectivity of Saint Martin) Unknown player (against Bermuda)
- (United States Virgin Islands) Unknown player (against Martinique)
- (United States Virgin Islands) Unknown player (against Puerto Rico)
