= 2001 CONCACAF U-17 Tournament =

Association football tournament for under-17 national teams

2001 CONCACAF U-17 Championship

Tournament details
- Host country: Honduras; United States
- Cities: San Pedro Sula; St. Louis
- Dates: 18 April – 6 May
- Teams: 8 (from 1 confederation)
- Venues: 2 (in 2 host cities)

Final positions
- Champions: United States
- Runners-up: Costa Rica
- Third place: Mexico
- Fourth place: Canada

Tournament statistics
- Matches played: 12
- Goals scored: 37 (3.08 per match)

The 2001 CONCACAF U-17 Tournament was played in Honduras and United States.

== 2001 CONCACAF U-17 Tournament qualification ==
The qualification for the 2001 CONCACAF U-17 Tournament took place between November 2000 and February 2001.

=== teams ===
Honduras were automatically qualified as hosts. Canada, Mexico and the United States did not have to enter qualifying either. The rest advanced from qualifying.

- Canada
- Costa Rica
- El Salvador
- Haiti
- Honduras
- Jamaica
- Mexico
- United States

== Caribbean Zone ==
=== First round ===
==== Group A ====
Pos	Team	Pld	W	D	L	GF	GA	GD	Pts	Qualification
1	Cuba	2	2	0	0	14	6	+8	6	Advance to Second round
2	Cayman Islands	2	1	0	1	6	3	+3	3	
3	U.S. Virgin Islands	2	0	0	2	0	17	−17	0	

6 December 2000

Cayman Islands	6–0	U.S. Virgin Islands

8 December 2000

Cuba	11–0	U.S. Virgin Islands

10 December 2000

Cayman Islands	0–3	Cuba

==== Group B ====
January 14, 2001

Dominican Republic	1–1	Saint Vincent and the Grenadines

January 21, 2001

Saint Vincent and the Grenadines	2–2	Dominican Republic

- Saint Vincent and the Grenadines advanced

==== Group C ====
Pos	Team	Pld	W	D	L	GF	GA	GD	Pts	Qualification
1	Netherlands Antilles	3	2	1	0	10	6	+4	7	Advance to Second round
2	Antigua and Barbuda	3	2	1	0	10	7	+3	7	
3	Dominica (H)	3	0	1	2	5	7	−2	1	
4	Aruba	3	0	1	2	4	9	−5	1	

(H) Hosts
November 22, 2000

Dominica	2–2	Aruba

November 22, 2000

Antigua and Barbuda	4–4	Netherlands Antilles

November 24, 2000

Netherlands Antilles	3–2	Dominica

November 24, 2000

Antigua and Barbuda	4–2	Aruba

November 26, 2000

Aruba	0–3	Netherlands Antilles

November 26, 2000

Antigua and Barbuda	2–1	Dominica

==== Group D ====
Pos	Team	Pld	W	D	L	GF	GA	GD	Pts	Qualification
1	Barbados	2	2	0	0	5	2	+3	6	Advance to Second round
2	Guyana (H)	2	1	0	1	2	1	+1	3	
3	Puerto Rico	2	0	0	2	2	6	−4	0	

(H) Hosts
November 29, 2000

Guyana	2–0	Puerto Rico

December 1, 2000

Guyana	0–1	Barbados

December 3, 2000

Barbados	4–2	Puerto Rico

==== Group E ====
Pos	Team	Pld	W	D	L	GF	GA	GD	Pts	Qualification
1	Jamaica	3	3	0	0	17	0	+17	9	Advance to Second round
2	Grenada	3	2	0	1	18	5	+13	6	
3	Saint Lucia	3	1	0	2	8	9	−1	3	
4	Anguilla	3	0	0	3	0	29	−29	0	

November 22, 2000

Jamaica	3–0	Grenada

November 22, 2000

Anguilla	0–6	Saint Lucia

November 24, 2000

Jamaica	12–0	Anguilla

November 24, 2000

Saint Lucia	2–7	Grenada

November 26, 2000

Jamaica	2–0	Saint Lucia

November 26, 2000

Grenada	11–0	Anguilla

=== Second round ===
==== Group 1 ====
Pos	Team	Pld	W	D	L	GF	GA	GD	Pts	Qualification
1	Haiti	3	3	0	0	11	2	+9	9	2001 CONCACAF U-17 Tournament
2	Cuba	3	2	0	1	8	4	+4	6	
3	Suriname	3	0	1	2	2	5	−3	1	
4	Saint Vincent and the Grenadines	3	0	1	2	3	13	−10	1	

February 21, 2001

Haiti	2–0	Suriname

February 21, 2001

Cuba	5–1	Saint Vincent and the Grenadines

February 23, 2001

Saint Vincent and the Grenadines	1–7	Haiti

February 23, 2001

Cuba	2–1	Suriname

February 25, 2001

Suriname	1–1	Saint Vincent and the Grenadines

February 25, 2001

Cuba	1–2	Haiti

==== Group 2 ====
Pos	Team	Pld	W	D	L	GF	GA	GD	Pts	Qualification
1	Jamaica	3	3	0	0	10	2	+8	9	2001 CONCACAF U-17 Tournament
2	Bermuda	3	2	0	1	9	4	+5	6	
3	Barbados	3	0	1	2	2	9	−7	1	
4	Netherlands Antilles	3	0	1	2	2	8	−6	1	

12 February 2001

Jamaica	2–0	Netherlands Antilles

12 February 2001

Bermuda	3–0	Barbados

14 February 2001

Jamaica	4–0	Barbados

14 February 2001

Netherlands Antilles	0–4	Bermuda

16 February 2001

Barbados	2–2	Netherlands Antilles

16 February 2001

Bermuda	2–4	Jamaica

== Central American Zone ==
Pos	Team	Pld	W	D	L	GF	GA	GD	Pts	Qualification
1	Costa Rica	4	3	1	0	13	2	+11	10	2001 CONCACAF U-17 Tournament
2	El Salvador	4	3	1	0	16	4	+12	10	2001 CONCACAF U-17 Tournament
3	Guatemala (H)	4	2	0	2	6	6	0	6	
4	Panama	4	1	0	3	6	10	−4	3	
5	Nicaragua	4	0	0	4	0	19	−19	0	

(H) Hosts
March 2, 2001

Costa Rica	5–0	Panama

March 2, 2001

Guatemala	2–0	Nicaragua

March 4, 2001

El Salvador	8–0	Nicaragua

March 4, 2001

Guatemala	2–1	Panama

March 7, 2001

Panama	5–0	Nicaragua

March 7, 2001

Costa Rica	2–2	El Salvador

March 9, 2001

Nicaragua	0–4	Costa Rica

March 9, 2001

Guatemala	2–3	El Salvador

March 11, 2001

El Salvador	3–0	Panama

March 11, 2001

Guatemala	0–2	Costa Rica

== Group stage ==
=== Group A ===
United States qualified to the 2001 FIFA U-17 World Championship in Trinidad and Tobago.

Pos	Team	Pld	W	D	L	GF	GA	GD	Pts	Qualification
1	United States (H)	3	3	0	0	10	3	+7	9	2001 FIFA U-17 World Championship
2	Canada	3	1	1	1	6	5	+1	4	
3	El Salvador	3	1	1	1	4	5	−1	4	
4	Jamaica	3	0	0	3	1	8	−7	0	

(H) Hosts
April 18, 2001

Canada	1–1	El Salvador
Unknown 20' (o.g.)		Ochoa 46'

Hermann Stadium, St. Louis, US
April 18, 2001

United States	2–1	Jamaica

Hermann Stadium, St. Louis, US

April 20, 2001

El Salvador	3–0	Jamaica

Hermann Stadium, St. Louis, US
April 20, 2001

United States	4–2	Canada
Johnson 14', 63'; Capano 63'; Lancos 69'		Belotte 32', 77'

Hermann Stadium, St. Louis, US

April 22, 2001

Canada	3–0	Jamaica
Belotte 56', 78'; Matondo 59'

Hermann Stadium, St. Louis, US
April 22, 2001

United States	4–0	El Salvador

Hermann Stadium, St. Louis, US

=== Group B ===
Costa Rica qualified to the 2001 FIFA U-17 World Championship in Trinidad and Tobago.

Pos	Team	Pld	W	D	L	GF	GA	GD	Pts	Qualification
1	Costa Rica	3	2	1	0	3	1	+2	7	2001 FIFA U-17 World Championship
2	Mexico	3	1	1	1	8	2	+6	4	
3	Haiti	3	1	0	2	2	9	−7	3	
4	Honduras (H)	3	0	2	1	3	4	−1	2	

(H) Hosts
May 2, 2001

Costa Rica	1–0	Mexico

San Pedro Sula, HON
May 2, 2001

Honduras	1–2	Haiti

San Pedro Sula, HON

May 4, 2001

Haiti	0–7	Mexico

San Pedro Sula, HON
May 4, 2001

Honduras	1–1	Costa Rica

San Pedro Sula, HON

May 6, 2001

Costa Rica	1–0	Haiti

San Pedro Sula, HON
May 6, 2001

Honduras	1–1	Mexico

San Pedro Sula, HON
