= Cuba national under-17 football team =

Cuba U-17
- Nickname: Leones del Caribe
- Association: Asociación de Fútbol de Cuba
- Confederation: CONCACAF (North America)
First colours	Second colours

Biggest win
- Cuba 11–0 US Virgin Islands (United States Virgin Islands) (December 7, 2000)

FIFA U-17 World Cup
- Appearances: 2 (first in 1989)
- Best result: Group stage (1989, 1991)

CONCACAF Under-17 Championship
- Appearances: 11 (first in 1988)
- Best result: Champions (1988)

The Cuba national under-17 football team represents Cuba in tournaments and friendly matches at the under-17 level and is controlled by the Asociación de Fútbol de Cuba.

== 2011 CONCACAF U-17 Championship qualification ==
=== Group A - final round ===
Team	GP	W	D	L	GF	GA	+/−	Pts
Trinidad and Tobago	3	2	1	0	10	1	+9	7
Cuba	3	2	1	0	4	1	+3	7
Saint Kitts and Nevis	3	1	0	2	3	11	−8	3
Bermuda	3	0	0	0	4	8	−4	0

== Competitive record ==
=== FIFA U-16/17 World Cup record ===
Year	Round	Position	Pld	W	D	L	GF	GA
(China) 1985	Did not enter							
(Canada) 1987	Did not enter							
(Scotland) 1989	Group stage	15th	3	0	1	2	2	8
(Italy) 1991	Group stage	16th	3	0	0	3	3	10
(Japan) 1993	Did not qualify							
(Ecuador) 1995	Did not qualify							
(Egypt) 1997	Did not qualify							
(New Zealand) 1999	Did not qualify							
(Trinidad and Tobago) 2001	Did not qualify							
(Finland) 2003	Did not qualify							
(Peru) 2005	Did not qualify							
(South Korea) 2007	Did not qualify							
(Nigeria) 2009	Did not qualify							
(Mexico) 2011	Did not qualify							
(United Arab Emirates) 2013	Did not qualify							
(Chile) 2015	Did not qualify							
(India) 2017	Did not qualify							
(Brazil) 2019	Did not enter							
(Indonesia) 2023	Did not qualify							
(Qatar) 2025	Did not qualify							
(Qatar) 2026	In progress	TBD	1	0	0	1	3	5
Totals:3/21	Group stage	15th	7	0	1	6	8	23

=== CONCACAF U-16/U-17 Championship record ===
- 1983: Did not enter
- 1985: Did not enter
- 1987: Did not enter
- 1988: Champions
- 1991: Third place
- 1992: Fourth place
- 1994: Did not enter
- 1996: Did not enter
- 1999: Did not enter
- 2001: Did not qualify
- 2003: Fourth place Group B
- 2005: Third place Group A
- 2007: Did not qualify
- 2009: Third place Group A (tournament interrupted)
- 2011: Group stage
- 2013: Group stage
- 2015: Group stage
- 2017: Classification stage
- 2019: Did not enter
- 2023: Round of 16
- From 1983 until 1991, competition was U-16, not U-17
- In 2009, the tournament was interrupted due to the swine flu.

== Current players ==
=== Current Squad ===
The following 21 players have been selected for the most recent fixtures in the 2026 CONCACAF U-17 World Cup qualification.

No.	Pos.	Player	Date of birth (age)	Club
1	GK	Noslen Godínez	12 October 2009 (age 17)	(Football Association of Cuba) La Habana
12	GK	Kevin Méndez	12 June 2009 (age 17)	(Football Association of Cuba) Ciego de Ávila
21	GK	Claudio Daysson	13 July 2011 (age 15)	(Football Association of Cuba) Guantánamo
15	DF	David Estrada	11 July 2011 (age 15)	(Football Association of Cuba) Matanzas
20	DF	Israel Pérez	15 March 2010 (age 16)	(Football Association of Cuba) Cienfuegos
3	DF	Erik La O Cornet	14 July 2009 (age 17)	(Football Association of Cuba) Guantánamo
4	DF	Erick Martín	13 February 2009 (age 17)	(Football Association of Cuba) Villa Clara
5	DF	Harold Guerra	19 January 2009 (age 17)	(Football Association of Cuba) La Habana
2	DF	Eliécer Sidos	30 July 2009 (age 17)	(Football Association of Cuba) La Habana
6	MF	Deiby Borrell (captain)	4 April 2009 (age 17)	(Football Association of Cuba) La Habana
7	MF	Iván Pacheco	16 June 2009 (age 17)	(Football Association of Cuba) La Habana
14	MF	Dylan Leiva	17 January 2010 (age 16)	(Football Association of Cuba) La Habana
16	MF	Alessandro Sevillano	3 November 2010 (age 16)	(Football Association of Cuba) Artemisa
17	MF	Luis Naveda	26 April 2009 (age 17)	(Football Association of Cuba) Pinar del Río
8	MF	Kevin Díaz	1 October 2009 (age 17)	(Football Association of Cuba) Camagüey
9	FW	Yojanry González	14 April 2009 (age 17)	(Football Association of Cuba) Cienfuegos
10	FW	Yankarlos Iglesias	2 May 2009 (age 17)	(Football Association of Cuba) La Habana
11	FW	Iker Rodríguez	12 January 2009 (age 17)	(Football Association of Cuba) La Habana
13	FW	Jesús Bernabé	28 August 2009 (age 17)	(Football Association of Cuba) La Habana
18	FW	Yan García	3 January 2009 (age 17)	(Football Association of Cuba) La Habana
19	FW	Deivys Curuneaux	31 December 2009 (age 16)	(Football Association of Cuba) Camagüey

== Honours ==
- CONCACAF Under-17 Championship
  - Winners (1): 1988

== See also ==
- Cuba national football team
- Cuba national under-20 football team
