= Guatemala national under-17 football team =

Guatemalan U-17

Guatemala U-17
- Nickname(s): La Azul y Blanco; Los Chapines; La Bicolor; La Furia Azul
- Association: Federación Nacional de Fútbol de Guatemala
- Confederation: CONCACAF (North America)
- Sub-confederation: UNCAF (Central America)
- Head coach: Rigoberto Gómez
- Home stadium: Estadio Doroteo Guamuch Flores
- FIFA code: GUA
First colours	Second colours

First international
- Guatemala 1–4 Honduras (Mexico City, Mexico; 14 May 1985)

Biggest win
- Guatemala 13–0 Nicaragua (San Salvador, El Salvador; 16 November 2008)

Biggest defeat
- Mexico 7–0 Guatemala (Mexico City, Mexico; 24 May 1985)

CONCACAF U-17 Championship
- Appearances: 12 (first in 1985)
- Best result: Quarter-finals (2013, 2023)

The Guatemala national U-17 football team is the national under-17 football team of Guatemala and is controlled by the Federación Nacional de Fútbol de Guatemala.

== Fixtures and recent results ==
The following is a list of match results from the previous 12 months, as well as any future matches that have been scheduled.

Win Draw Loss

== Players ==
For the 2026 CONCACAF U-17 World Cup qualification, held at Estadio Cementos Progreso, coach Willy Olivera, who hails from Uruguay, named a 21-man squad, with eight players hailing from clubs in the United States. Guatemala beat Antigua and Barbuda 2–0 and Grenada 7–0, but a 2–1 loss to Haiti in the final group match, in which Patrick Arana scored Guatemala's goal, eliminated the team from contention for the 2026 FIFA U-17 World Cup in Qatar.

=== Current squad ===
The following 21 players have been called up for the most recent fixtures in the 2026 CONCACAF U-17 World Cup qualification.

No.	Pos.	Player	Date of birth (age)	Club
1	GK	Ethan Ruppert	5 February 2009 (age 17)	(United States Soccer Federation) Orlando City SC
12	GK	Alex Pinzón	1 May 2009 (age 17)	(National Football Federation of Guatemala) Xelajú
21	GK	José Pablo García	24 February 2009 (age 17)	(National Football Federation of Guatemala) Comunicaciones
3	DF	Anthony Mártir	22 March 2009 (age 17)	(National Football Federation of Guatemala) Achuapa
4	DF	Jeffrey Interiano	10 May 2009 (age 17)	(United States Soccer Federation) New York City FC
5	DF	Marcos Arango	15 December 2009 (age 16)	(National Football Federation of Guatemala) Xelajú
14	DF	Jorge Castellanos	4 June 2009 (age 17)	(United States Soccer Federation) Woodstock Academy
2	DF	Leandro Rivas	22 October 2009 (age 17)	(United States Soccer Federation) Charlotte FC
18	DF	Taylor Santiago	27 June 2009 (age 17)	(National Football Federation of Guatemala) Xelajú
19	DF	Daniel González	22 April 2009 (age 17)	(United States Soccer Federation) Charlotte FC
10	MF	Patrick Arana	14 March 2009 (age 17)	(Canadian Soccer Association) CF Montréal
15	MF	Julio Sandoval (captain)	7 December 2009 (age 16)	(National Football Federation of Guatemala) Cobán Imperial
16	MF	Joshua Jimenez	8 May 2010 (age 16)	(United States Soccer Federation) FC Cincinnati
6	MF	Deyvid Mejía	5 April 2009 (age 17)	(National Football Federation of Guatemala) Comunicaciones
8	MF	Andoni Jiménez	16 December 2009 (age 16)	(National Football Federation of Guatemala) Comunicaciones
20	MF	Troi Panniel	5 February 2009 (age 17)	(United States Soccer Federation) New York Red Bulls
11	FW	Jorge de León	23 January 2009 (age 17)	(National Football Federation of Guatemala) Comunicaciones
17	FW	Jeffrey González	4 June 2009 (age 17)	(National Football Federation of Guatemala) Xelajú
13	FW	Ángel García	20 December 2009 (age 16)	(National Football Federation of Guatemala) AFF Guatemala
7	FW	Matías Micheo	8 February 2009 (age 17)	(National Football Federation of Guatemala) Comunicaciones
9	FW	Hensen Chacón	25 April 2009 (age 17)	(National Football Federation of Guatemala) Municipal

== Tournament records ==
=== FIFA U-17 World Cup ===
Year	Round	Pld	W	D	L	GF	GA
(China) 1985	Did not qualify						
(Canada) 1987	Did not qualify						
(Scotland) 1989	Did not qualify						
(Italy) 1991	Did not qualify						
(Japan) 1993	Did not qualify						
(Ecuador) 1995	Did not qualify						
(Egypt) 1997	Did not qualify						
(New Zealand) 1999	Did not qualify						
(Trinidad and Tobago) 2001	Did not qualify						
(Finland) 2003	Did not qualify						
(Peru) 2005	Did not qualify						
(South Korea) 2007	Did not qualify						
(Nigeria) 2009	Did not qualify						
(Mexico) 2011	Did not qualify						
(United Arab Emirates) 2013	Did not qualify						
(Chile) 2015	Did not qualify						
(India) 2017	Disqualified from qualification						
(Brazil) 2019	Did not qualify						
(Indonesia) 2023	Did not qualify						
(Qatar) 2025	To be determined						
Total	0/20	0	0	0	0	0	0

=== CONCACAF U-17 championship record ===
- 1983: Did not enter
- 1985: First stage
- 1987: Did not enter
- 1988: First stage
- 1991: First stage
- 1992: First stage
- 1994: Did not enter
- 1996: First stage
- 1999: Did not qualify (lost qualifying playoff)
- 2001: Did not qualify
- 2003: Fourth place Group A
- 2005: Did not qualify
- 2007: Did not qualify
- 2009: Third place Group B (tournament interrupted)
- 2011: Group stage
- 2013: Quarter-finals
- 2015: Group stage
- 2017: Disqualified from qualification
- 2019: Round of 16
- 2023: Quarter-finals
- From 1983 until 1991, competition was U-16, not U-17
- In 2009 the tournament was interrupted due to the swine flu.
