= Jarrett Park =

Sports stadium

- Interactive map of Jarrett Park

Ground information
- Location: Cottage Road, Montego Bay, Jamaica
- Country: West Indies
- Coordinates: 18°28′07.92″N 77°54′56.39″W
- Capacity: 4,000
- Tenants: Cricket Jamaica cricket team (1965–2001) Football Montego Bay United (1972–2013); Jamaica National Football team (selected matches); Wadadah (1983-Present)

International information
- Only women's Test: 7–9 May 1976: West Indies v Australia

Team information
Jamaica	(1865–2001)
- As of 3 September 2020; Source: CricketArchive

Jarrett Park is a multi-use stadium in the city of Montego Bay, Jamaica. It has a capacity of 4,000 people.

In 1976 it hosted the first ever Women's Test match played by the West Indies Women, against Australia Women.

It was used by the local football club Seba United. The stadium has also been used by the Jamaica national football team, latest in the 2008 Caribbean Championship. And was also one of the venues of the 2011 CONCACAF U-17 Championship

== History ==
The property was purchased by the St James Parish Council, now St James Municipal Corporation, in 1957, fulfilling the need for a permanent recreational venue for the residents of Montego Bay.

== Cricket Venue ==
From 1965 to 2001 Jarrett Park hosted regional first class matches while hosting a women's test international match in 1976.

== Football Venue ==
The Stadium has hosted association football with Jamaica Premier League club Montego Bay United FC until 2013 when the club moved to the cross town to the Cathrine Hall Sports Complex. Jarrett Park also the home of 2 time Jamaica Premier League champions Wadadah FC, it is also the home of Faulkland Football Club since 2013 (to present) when they started playing in the St. James Division 2 football Competition and has also hosted selected international matches of the senior Jamaica national football team & the Jamaica national U-20 and U-17 teams. In 2008 Jarrett Park was selected as one of the host venues for the 2008 Caribbean cup and was also selected as one of the host venues for the 2011 CONCACAF U-17 championship.
