= Trinidad and Tobago national under-17 football team =

Trinidad and Tobago U-17
- Nickname: The Soca Warriors
- Association: Trinidad and Tobago Football Association
- Confederation: CONCACAF
- Head coach: Randolph Boyce
- Captain: Nikosi Foncette
- FIFA code: TRI
| First colours | Second colours |

FIFA U-17 World Cup
- Appearances: 2 (first in 2001)
- Best result: Group stage (2001, 2007)

CONCACAF Under-17 Championship
- Appearances: 15 (first in 1983)
- Best result: Runners-up (1983)

The Trinidad and Tobago national U-17 football team represents Trinidad and Tobago in tournaments and friendly matches at the under-17 level. They are coached by Randolph Boyce, and have made two FIFA U-17 World Cup appearances.

== Fixtures and recent results ==
The following is a list of match results from the previous 12 months, as well as any future matches that have been scheduled.

Win Draw Loss

== Current players ==
=== Current squad ===
The following 21 players were called up for the most recent fixtures in 2026 CONCACAF U-17 World Cup qualification

| No. | Pos. | Player | Date of birth (age) | Club |
|---|---|---|---|---|
| 1 | GK | Mikhail Clement | 17 January 2009 (age 17) | (Trinidad and Tobago Football Association) Naparima College |
| 18 | GK | Necose Moore | 5 January 2009 (age 17) | (Trinidad and Tobago Football Association) St Anthony’s College |
| 21 | GK | Levi Williams | 2 July 2010 (age 16) | (United States Soccer Federation) Inter Miami |
| 4 | DF | Antonio Hills | 6 November 2009 (age 16) | (Trinidad and Tobago Football Association) Club Sando |
| 5 | DF | Jaylon Roberts | 19 June 2010 (age 16) | (Trinidad and Tobago Football Association) Saint Mary's College |
| 13 | DF | Adriel Faure | 29 September 2009 (age 17) | (Trinidad and Tobago Football Association) St. Anthony's College |
| 16 | DF | Kenai Richardson | 26 March 2010 (age 16) | (Trinidad and Tobago Football Association) Fatima College |
| 3 | DF | Sebastian James | 2 April 2010 (age 16) | (Trinidad and Tobago Football Association) Naparima College |
| 20 | DF | Akel Vesprey | 24 January 2009 (age 17) | (Jamaica Football Federation) Munro College |
| 2 | DF | Reagan Rowe | 7 September 2010 (age 16) | (Trinidad and Tobago Football Association) Fatima College |
| 6 | MF | Jeremiah Daniel (captain) | 30 January 2009 (age 17) | (Trinidad and Tobago Football Association) Naparima College |
| 12 | MF | Daniel Lewis | | (Trinidad and Tobago Football Association) San Juan North Secondary |
| 19 | MF | Antuan Louison | 23 March 2009 (age 17) | (Trinidad and Tobago Football Association) Fatima College |
| 8 | MF | Donovan Drayton | 2 March 2009 (age 17) | (Trinidad and Tobago Football Association) Naparima College |
| 10 | MF | Finn de Freitas | 9 February 2009 (age 17) | (Trinidad and Tobago Football Association) Saint Mary's College |
| 15 | MF | Christian Pitt | 1 September 2009 (age 17) | (Canadian Soccer Association) Toronto FC |
| 17 | FW | Jeremai Nanton | 1 October 2010 (age 16) | (Trinidad and Tobago Football Association) Fatima College |
| 7 | FW | Jasai Theophilus | 21 December 2009 (age 16) | (Trinidad and Tobago Football Association) QRC FC |
| 9 | FW | J'meke Watkins | 15 October 2009 (age 17) | (Trinidad and Tobago Football Association) Signal Hill Secondary |
| 11 | FW | Adasa Richardson | 31 July 2010 (age 16) | (Trinidad and Tobago Football Association) Naparima College |
| 14 | FW | Kanye Glasgow | 21 January 2009 (age 17) | (Trinidad and Tobago Football Association) St. Anthony's College |

== Competitive record ==
=== CONCACAF U-17 championship record ===
- 1983: Runners-up
- 1985: First stage
- 1987: First stage
- 1988: Fourth place
- 1991: Fourth place
- 1992: Did not enter
- 1994: First stage
- 1996: First stage
- 1999: Fourth place Group B
- 2001: Did not enter
- 2003: Did not qualify
- 2005: Did not qualify
- 2007: Third place Group B
- 2009: Fourth place Group B (tournament interrupted)
- 2011: Quarter-finals
- 2013: Quarter-finals
- 2015: Group stage
- 2017: Did not qualify
- 2019: Round of 16
- 2023: Round of 16
- From 1983 until 1991, competition was U-16, not U-17
- In 2009, the tournament was interrupted due to the swine flu.

=== FIFA U-16/17 World Cup record ===
| Year | Round | Position | Pld | W | D | L | GF | GA |
|---|---|---|---|---|---|---|---|---|
| (China) 1985 | Did not qualify | | | | | | | |
| (Canada) 1987 | Did not qualify | | | | | | | |
| (Scotland) 1989 | Did not qualify | | | | | | | |
| (Italy) 1991 | Did not qualify | | | | | | | |
| (Japan) 1993 | Did not qualify | | | | | | | |
| (Ecuador) 1995 | Did not qualify | | | | | | | |
| (Egypt) 1997 | Did not qualify | | | | | | | |
| (New Zealand) 1999 | Did not qualify | | | | | | | |
| (Trinidad and Tobago) 2001 | Group stage | 16th | 3 | 0 | 0 | 3 | 2 | 9 |
| (Finland) 2003 | Did not qualify | | | | | | | |
| (Peru) 2005 | Did not qualify | | | | | | | |
| (South Korea) 2007 | Group stage | 23rd | 3 | 0 | 0 | 3 | 1 | 14 |
| (Nigeria) 2009 | Did not qualify | | | | | | | |
| (Mexico) 2011 | Did not qualify | | | | | | | |
| (United Arab Emirates) 2013 | Did not qualify | | | | | | | |
| (Chile) 2015 | Did not qualify | | | | | | | |
| (India) 2017 | Did not qualify | | | | | | | |
| (Brazil) 2019 | Did not qualify | | | | | | | |
| (Indonesia) 2023 | Did not qualify | | | | | | | |
| (Qatar) 2025 | To be determined | | | | | | | |
| Total | Group stage | 2/20 | 6 | 0 | 0 | 6 | 3 | 23 |

== See also ==
- Trinidad and Tobago men's national football team
- CONCACAF Under-17 Championship
- 2013 CONCACAF U-17 Championship qualifying
- 2013 FIFA U-17 World Cup
