= Jaheim Mena =

Belizean footballer (born 2006)

Personal information
- Full name: Jaheim Roy Mena
- Date of birth: 23 February 2006 (age 20)
- Place of birth: Seine Bight, Belize
- Height: 1.80 m (5 ft 11 in)
- Position: Striker

Team information
- Current team: Oaxaca

Senior career*
Years	Team	Apps	(Gls)
2024–2025	San Pedro Pirates	18	(10)
2025–	Oaxaca	0	(0)

International career^{‡}
2024–	Belize	6	(0)
- * Club domestic league appearances and goals ‡ National team caps and goals as of 13:51, 22 June 2025 (UTC)

Jaheim Mena (born 23 February 2006) is a Belizean association footballer who currently plays for Oaxaca of Mexico’s Liga de Expansión MX and the Belize national team.

== Club career ==
Mena competed with his Stann Creek District team in the 2022 National Elite Youth Football Championships. In 2024, he was part of the Toledo Legends FC team that took part in the National Amateur Inter-District Championship. He scored four goals against defending champions Club Atletico of Belmopan to qualify for the semi-finals. In the semi-final match, Mena scored against the San Pedro Terror Squad but it was not enough to avoid defeat and elimination. Mena went on to be the top scorer in the competition.

In August 2024, Mena joined Premier League of Belize club San Pedro Pirates FC after being spotted playing against the San Pedro Terror Squad in that year's National Amateur Inter-District Championship. He scored in his league debut for the club to help secure a 2–2 draw with Wagiya on 24 August. That season, Mena scored in the playoffs of the closing season to help defeat regular-season champions Port Layola and advanced to the championship series. The Pirates ultimately finished as runners-up after falling to Verdes FC in the finals.

In June 2025, it was announced that Mena, along with three other Belize internationals, would travel to Mexico for a 21-day trial with Alebrijes de Oaxaca of the Liga de Expansión MX, the second tier of the Mexican football league system. Following the trial, it was announced that Mena and Freybin Pagoada had been selected to join the club with Mena joining immediately.

== International career ==
At the youth level, Mena represented Belize in 2022 CONCACAF U-17 Championship qualifying. He scored against Antigua and Barbuda in the team's opening match to help secure a 1–1 draw. Belize finished second in its group behind Nicaragua, failing to qualify for the final tournament. Two years later, Mena was part of the Belize under-20 squad that participated in 2024 CONCACAF U-20 Championship qualifying. He scored to take the early lead against the British Virgin Islands, but Belize ultimately fell following a comeback by the British territory.

In September 2024, Mena was included in Belize's senior squad for 2024–25 CONCACAF Nations League C matches against the Turks and Caicos and Anguilla. He went on to make his senior international debut on 7 September 2024 in the match against Turks and Caicos.

=== International career statistics ===
As of match played 7 June 2025.

Belize national team
2024	2	0
2025	4	0
Total	6	0

== Beach soccer ==
Mena also plays beach soccer. In 2022, his team, the Seine Bight Christ Warriors, finished in third place in the Travel Belize Beach Soccer Cup with Mena scoring five goals in the bronze medal match. He finished as joint-top scorer in the competition. The following year, he was named to the Belize national beach soccer team for the 2023 CONCACAF Beach Soccer Championship. He scored one goal in Belize's opening match of the competition, an eventual 2–4 loss to Mexico.
