= Wendell Downswell =

Jamaican footballer and manager (born 1958)

Personal information
- Full name: Wendell Downswell
- Date of birth: 5 February 1958 (age 68)
- Place of birth: Savannah-la-Mar, Jamaica
- Height: 5 ft 10 in (1.78 m)
- Position: Forward

Youth career
- 1968–1976: Reno F.C.

Senior career*
Years	Team	Apps	(Gls)
1976–1988	Reno F.C.		

International career
1977–1984	Jamaica	6	(0)

Managerial career
- 2000–2005: Jamaica U20
- 2004–2006: Jamaica
- 2006–2007: Reno F.C.
- 2007: Jamaica U20
- 2007: Jamaica U-23
- 2008–2010: Reno F.C. (Technical Director)
- 2010–2014: Jamaica U17
- 2017–2021: Jamaica (Director of Football)
- 2021–: Jamaica (Technical Director)
- * Club domestic league appearances and goals

Wendell Downswell (born 5 February 1958) the current Jamaica youth national team technical director as well as the technical director of Jamaica

== Playing career ==
=== High school and college ===
Downswell was born Savannah-la-Mar, Jamaica. He played for and attended St. Elizabeth Technical High School in Jamaica. He then completed his degree in Physical Education at G.C. Foster College in Spanish Town, Jamaica. He also pursuing a master's degree at the UWI, Mona.

=== Professional ===
Downswell played for Reno F.C. in the Jamaica National Premiere League as a winger.

=== International ===
From 1976, Downswell made several appearance for the Jamaica national football team.

== Coaching career ==
Downswell has traveled extensively to the United States, Germany, Paraguay, Brazil and other countries to participate in numerous coaching certifications courses and programs. He is also currently the lead instructor for the JFF Coaching Program.

=== St. Elizabeth Technical High School (STETHS) ===
In 2007, he also joined the St. Elizabeth Technical High School (STETHS) football coach staff as technical director.

=== Reno F.C. ===
Downswell had been involved in the coaching department of Reno F.C. since 1985.

=== Jamaica youth national teams ===
Under the guidance and recommendation of Rene Simoes, Downswell was selected to coach the u20 national team in 2000 and held that position until 2005. In 2001, he coached Jamaica U20 national team at the 2001 FIFA World Youth Championship. He rejoined the youth national team staff from 2007–2008 and again in 2010. During the 2007 Pan Games in Rio de Janeiro, Brazil, he led his squad to team to a silver medal. In 2010, he led the Jamaica U17 national team tour in São Paulo, Brazil ahead of the 2011 CONCACAF U17 finals. In February 2011, Downswell led Jamaica U17 to a fourth-place finish in the 2011 CONCACAF U-17 Championship Finals and qualification to the 2011 FIFA U-17 World Cup in Mexico, scheduled in June 2011.

=== Jamaica senior national team ===
During his time as national team head coach, he won the 2005 Caribbean Cup title and made the quarterfinals of the 2005 CONCACAF Gold Cup. Downswell also served as an assistant coach in 2007.

In 2017, Downswell was named Director of Football

== Personal life ==
Wendell Downswell's son, Renario, also played at STETHS and played in the youth system of Reno F.C.

== Honours ==
Reno F.C.

- Western Confederation Super League: 2010

Jamaica

- Caribbean Cup: 2005
- Pan American Games: runner-up 2007
