= Eduardo Acevedo (disambiguation) =

Eduardo Acevedo may refer to:

- Eduardo Acevedo Maturana (1815–1863), Uruguayan jurist and politician
- Eduardo Acevedo Díaz (1851–1921), Uruguayan journalist and politician
- Eduardo Acevedo (footballer, born 1959), Uruguayan football player and manager
- Eduardo Acevedo (Guatemalan footballer) (born 1964), Guatemalan football player and manager
- Eduardo Blanco Acevedo (1884–1971), Uruguayan political figure and physician

== See also ==
- Edward Acevedo (disambiguation)
