= Stevie Rodriguez =

American soccer player

Personal information
- Full name: Esteban Rodriguez Loera
- Date of birth: February 11, 1994 (age 32)
- Place of birth: Los Angeles, California, United States
- Height: 1.68 m (5 ft 6 in)
- Position: Midfielder

Youth career
- 2010: Cosmos Academy West
- 2010–2011: IMG Academy
- 2011–2012: Chivas USA

Senior career*
| Years | Team | Apps | (Gls) |
| 2012–2016 | Tijuana | 0 | (0) |
| 2014–2015 | → Sinaloa (loan) | 19 | (3) |
| 2016 | → Atlante (loan) | 2 | (0) |

International career^{‡}
| 2010–2011 | United States U17 | 25 | (4) |
- * Club domestic league appearances and goals as of December 17, 2015 ‡ National team caps and goals as of August 5, 2014

Esteban "Stevie" Rodriguez Loera (born February 11, 1994) is an American professional soccer player.

== Career ==
=== Club ===
Rodriguez signed with Club Tijuana upon turning 18 in 2012, with his youth club, Chivas USA, having been unable to reach a deal for him under Major League Soccer's Homegrown Player Rule.

He was loaned to Dorados, Tijuana's Ascenso MX affiliate, in 2014. He scored his first career first-team goal in August 2014.

== Atlante ==
In December 2015, Club Tijuana send Rodriguez on loan to Atlante FC.

=== International ===
Born in the United States, Rodriguez is of Mexican descent. He started four matches for the United States at the 2011 FIFA U-17 World Cup.

== Honors ==
United States U17

- CONCACAF U-17 Championship: 2011
