= Jamaica national under-17 football team =

National association football team

Jamaica Under-17
- Nickname: The Reggae Boyz
- Association: Jamaica Football Federation
- Confederation: CONCACAF (North America)
- Sub-confederation: CFU (Caribbean)
- Head coach: (Jamaica) Wendell Downswell
First colours	Second colours

First international
- Mexico 1–0 Jamaica (Honduras; 14 February 1987)

Biggest win
- Jamaica 19-0 U.S. Virgin Islands (Kingston, Jamaica; 23 August 2014)

Biggest defeat
- Turkey 10–1 Jamaica (Antalya, Turkey; 24 April 2024)

FIFA U-17 World Cup
- Appearances: 3 (first in 1999)
- Best result: Group stage (1999, 2011)

CONCACAF Under-17 Championship
- Appearances: 15 (first in 1987)
- Best result: Fourth place (2011)

The Jamaica national under-17 football team is the national under-17 football team of Jamaica and is controlled by the Jamaica Football Federation. The highest level of competition in which the team may compete is in the FIFA U-17 World Cup, which is held annually.

== History ==
The team has qualified for two out of nineteen FIFA U-17 World Cups. On November 5, 2011, the Jamaican men's under-17 football team achieved its first-ever point at a FIFA U-17 World Cup in a 1–1 against France a match in Doha, Qatar. Zhelano Barnes scored the equalizer in the 22nd minute, and this was the first goal scored by the Jamaican team at the tournament over 2 participations.

== Tournament records ==
=== FIFA U-17 World Cup record ===
FIFA U-17 World Cup record
Year	Round	Position	Pld	W	D*	L	GF	GA
(China) 1985	Did not enter							
(Canada) 1987	Did not qualify							
(Scotland) 1989	Did not qualify							
(Italy) 1991	Did not qualify							
(Japan) 1993	Did not qualify							
(Ecuador) 1995	Did not qualify							
(Egypt) 1997	Did not enter							
(New Zealand) 1999	Group stage	15th	3	0	0	3	0	10
(Trinidad and Tobago) 2001	Did not qualify							
(Finland) 2003	Did not qualify							
(Peru) 2005	Did not qualify							
(South Korea) 2007	Did not qualify							
(Nigeria) 2009	Did not qualify							
(Mexico) 2011	Group stage	21st	3	0	1	2	2	4
(United Arab Emirates) 2013	Did not qualify							
(Chile) 2015	Did not qualify							
(India) 2017	Did not qualify							
(Brazil) 2019	Did not qualify							
(Indonesia) 2023	Did not qualify							
(Qatar) 2025	Did not qualify							
(Qatar) 2026	In progress	TBD	1	0	0	1	0	6
Total:3/21	Group stage	15th	7	0	1	6	2	20

== CONCACAF U-17 Championship Record ==
- 1983: Did not enter
- 1985: Did not enter
- 1987: Third place Group B
- 1988: Third place Group B
- 1991: Second place Group 1
- 1992: Third place Group B
- 1994: Third place Group 1
- 1996: Did not enter
- 1999: First place Group A
- 2001: Fourth place Group A
- 2003: Second place Group A; lost in playoff; Did not qualify
- 2005: Eliminated in 2nd round
- 2007: Fifth place Group B
- 2009: Eliminated in semifinals of the 2008 CFU Youth Cup; Did not qualify
- 2011: Fourth place
- 2013: Quarter-finals
- 2015: Playoff stage
- 2017: Group stage
- 2019: Round of 16
- 2023: Round of 16
- 2025: Group stage
- 2026: First place in group G
- From 1983 until 1994, competition was U-16, not U-17

== Recent and upcoming matches ==
=== 2026 ===
20 November 2026 2026 FIFA U-17 World Cup	Italy	v	Jamaica	Aspire Zone, Al Rayyan
18:00		Report

23 November 2026 2026 FIFA U-17 World Cup	Uzbekistan	v	Jamaica	Aspire Zone, Al Rayyan
16:00		Report

26 November 2026 2026 FIFA U-17 World Cup	Jamaica	v	Ivory Coast	Aspire Zone, Al Rayyan
17:00		Report

== Current players ==
=== 2026 squad ===
Squad named for the 2026 CONCACAF U-17 Championship which will be held from February 2-11 2026 in Costa Rica. Drawn into Group G, Jamaica will play Aruba Cayman Islands, and Canada on February 6, 8, and 11, respectively.Caps and goals as of February 8, 2026, after the match against Cayman Ialands.

No.	Pos.	Player	Date of birth (age)	Caps	Goals	Club
1	GK	O'Mario White	November 17, 2009 (age 17)	2	0	(Canadian Soccer Association) Toronto FC Academy
13	GK	Kemal Mattocks	October 25, 2009 (age 17)	0	0	(United States Soccer Federation) Strikers Miami F.C.
21	GK	Jahieme Gray	March 25, 2010 (age 16)	0	0	(Jamaica Football Federation) Cavaliers FC
2	DF	Tyraun Bembribge	May 13, 2009 (age 17)	1	2	(Jamaica Football Federation) Harbour View FC
3	DF	Jalani Bradshaw	May 7, 2009 (age 17)	1	0	(United States Soccer Federation) Atlanta United Academy
4	DF	Jaeden Morgan	November 1, 2009 (age 17)	2	0	(United States Soccer Federation) Phillips Academy Andover
5	DF	Jaeshawn Edwards	September 3, 2009 (age 17)	2	0	(Jamaica Football Federation) Harbour View FC
11	FW	Kenoy Banton	January 22, 2009 (age 17)	2	0	(Jamaica Football Federation) STETHS Elite Football Academy
14	DF	Raheem Kelly	February 2, 2009 (age 17)	1	0	(Jamaica Football Federation) Old Harbour Bay United
15	DF	Rajon Mckenzie	May 25, 2009 (age 17)	1	1	(Jamaica Football Federation) Reno FC
6	MF	Romie Henry	June 6, 2009 (age 17)	2		(Jamaica Football Federation) Real Mona F.C.
8	MF	Jaheem Bennett	November 20, 2009 (age 17)	2	1	(United States Soccer Federation) New York City FC
12	MF	Duwayne Burgher	July 7, 2009 (age 17)	2	0	(Jamaica Football Federation) Waterhouse FC
16	MF	Lukas Anderson	March 9, 2009 (age 17)	1	0	(United States Soccer Federation) Bethesda Soccer Club
17	MF	Justin Hayles	January 7, 2009 (age 17)	2	1	(Jamaica Football Federation) Clarendon Collage
18	MF	Jude Royes	June 27, 2009 (age 17)	1	0	(United States Soccer Federation) Athletum F.C.
19	MF	Kai Williamson	May 25, 2009 (age 17)	2	0	(United States Soccer Federation) Inter Miami CF
7	FW	Jamone Lyle	July 10, 2009 (age 17)	2	2	(Jamaica Football Federation) Waterhouse F.C.
9	FW	Kelvin Brown	January 17, 2009 (age 17)	2	5	(Jamaica Football Federation) Harbour View F.C.
10	FW	Jahmarie Nolan	November 11, 2009 (age 17)	5	6	(Canadian Soccer Association) Toronto FC II
20	DF	Javan Foster	January 11, 2009 (age 17)	2	0	(Jamaica Football Federation) Garvey Maceo High School

== Coaching staff ==
=== Current staff ===
As of February 11, 2026.

Position	Name
National Team Head Coach	Wendell Downswell
Assistant Coach	Vaesell Reynolds
Assistant Coach	Altimont Buttler
Goalkeeping Coach	Evadean Scarlet
Performance Manager	Andrew Peart
