= 2026 CONCACAF U-17 World Cup qualification =

20th CONCACAF qualification for the FIFA U-17 World Cup

2026 Concacaf U-17 Men's Qualifiers
Tournament details
- Host countries: Costa Rica; Guatemala; Honduras; Panama; Saint Vincent and the Grenadines; Trinidad and Tobago
- Dates: 3–12 February 2026
- Teams: 32 (from 1 confederation)
- Venues: 6 (in 6 host cities)

Tournament statistics
- Matches played: 49
- Goals scored: 255 (5.2 per match)

2026 CONCACAF U-17 World Cup qualification, officially called the 2026 Concacaf U-17 Men's Qualifiers, decided which teams from CONCACAF join host Qatar at the 2026 FIFA U-17 World Cup. Eight qualifying slots were allocated to CONCACAF.

== Teams ==
The 41 CONCACAF national teams were ranked based on the CONCACAF Men's Under-17 Ranking as of 24 April 2025. 34 teams originally entered the tournament, and two subsequently withdrew, resulting in 32 teams participating.

April 2025 rankings

Participating (32 teams)
Rank	Team	Points
1	Mexico	5,264
2	United States	4,777
3	Canada	3,408
4	Panama	2,577
5	Honduras	2,161
6	Costa Rica	2,133
7	Haiti	1,996
8	El Salvador	1,727
9	Nicaragua	1,464
10	Puerto Rico	1,376
11	Jamaica	1,243
12	Bermuda	1,187
13	Dominican Republic	1,170
14	Guatemala	1,133
15	Trinidad and Tobago	1,108
16	Curaçao	1,081
17	Cuba	1,013
18	Guyana	955
19	Aruba	893
20	Barbados	747
~~21~~	~~Guadeloupe~~ (W)	~~725~~
22	British Virgin Islands	693
23	Saint Kitts and Nevis	683
24	Antigua and Barbuda	678
25	Belize	606
26	Cayman Islands	519
29	Saint Martin	472
~~30~~	~~Suriname~~ (W)	~~459~~
31	Anguilla	388
32	Turks and Caicos Islands	338
33	Saint Vincent and the Grenadines	332
34	Grenada	328
36	Dominica	276
38	Sint Maarten	104

Did not enter (7 teams)
Rank	Team	Points
27	Martinique	515
28	Bahamas	480
35	Saint Lucia	291
37	U.S. Virgin Islands	208
39	Bonaire	92
40	French Guiana	0
41	Montserrat	0

- (W): Withdrew after draw.

== Draw ==
The final draw took place on 21 October 2025, 11:00 ET, at the CONCACAF headquarters in Miami. The teams were drawn into two groups of five and six groups of four.

Pot 1	Pot 2	Pot 3	Pot 4	Pot 5
1. Mexico; 2. United States; 3. Canada; 4. Panama; 5. Honduras; 6. Costa Rica; 7. Haiti; 8. El Salvador	9. Nicaragua; 10. Puerto Rico; 11. Jamaica; 12. Bermuda; 13. Dominican Republic; 14. Guatemala; 15. Trinidad and Tobago; 16. Curaçao	17. Cuba; 18. Guyana; 19. Aruba; 20. Barbados; 21. ~~Guadeloupe~~ (W); 22. British Virgin Islands; 23. Saint Kitts and Nevis; 24. Antigua and Barbuda	25. Belize; 26. Cayman Islands; 27. Saint Martin; 28. ~~Suriname~~ (W); 29. Anguilla; 30. Turks and Caicos Islands; 31. Saint Vincent and the Grenadines; 32. Grenada	33. Dominica; 34. Sint Maarten

- (W): Withdrew after draw.

== Groups ==
The tournament was played from 3–12 February 2026. The teams played a round-robin and the winner of each group qualified for the 2026 FIFA U-17 World Cup.

=== Group A ===
Pos	Team	Pld	W	D	L	GF	GA	GD	Pts	Qualification
1	Mexico	4	4	0	0	20	2	+18	12	2026 FIFA U-17 World Cup
2	Barbados	4	3	0	1	15	5	+10	9	
3	Trinidad and Tobago (H)	4	2	0	2	10	3	+7	6	
4	Saint Martin	4	1	0	3	3	11	−8	3	
5	Sint Maarten	4	0	0	4	1	28	−27	0	

Source: CONCACAF
Rules for classification: Tiebreakers
(H) Hosts

=== Group B ===
Pos	Team	Pld	W	D	L	GF	GA	GD	Pts	Qualification
1	Panama (H)	3	3	0	0	16	2	+14	9	2026 FIFA U-17 World Cup
2	Nicaragua	3	2	0	1	11	5	+6	6	
3	Anguilla	3	0	1	2	1	10	−9	1	
4	Dominica	3	0	1	2	3	14	−11	1	
5	Guadeloupe	0	0	0	0	0	0	0	0	Withdrew

Source: CONCACAF
Rules for classification: Tiebreakers
(H) Hosts

=== Group C ===
Pos	Team	Pld	W	D	L	GF	GA	GD	Pts	Qualification
1	Haiti	3	3	0	0	11	2	+9	9	2026 FIFA U-17 World Cup
2	Guatemala (H)	3	2	0	1	10	2	+8	6	
3	Antigua and Barbuda	3	1	0	2	1	6	−5	3	
4	Grenada	3	0	0	3	1	13	−12	0	

Source: CONCACAF
Rules for classification: Tiebreakers
(H) Hosts

=== Group D ===
Pos	Team	Pld	W	D	L	GF	GA	GD	Pts	Qualification
1	Costa Rica (H)	3	2	1	0	35	0	+35	7	2026 FIFA U-17 World Cup
2	Puerto Rico	3	2	1	0	15	0	+15	7	
3	Turks and Caicos Islands	3	0	1	2	2	14	−12	1	
4	British Virgin Islands	3	0	1	2	2	40	−38	1	

Source: CONCACAF
Rules for classification: Tiebreakers
(H) Hosts

=== Group E ===
Pos	Team	Pld	W	D	L	GF	GA	GD	Pts	Qualification
1	United States	3	2	1	0	19	1	+18	7	2026 FIFA U-17 World Cup
2	Dominican Republic	3	2	1	0	16	1	+15	7	
3	Saint Kitts and Nevis	3	0	1	2	2	17	−15	1	
4	Saint Vincent and the Grenadines (H)	3	0	1	2	2	20	−18	1	

Source: CONCACAF
Rules for classification: Tiebreakers
(H) Hosts

=== Group F ===
Pos	Team	Pld	W	D	L	GF	GA	GD	Pts	Qualification
1	Cuba	3	2	1	0	3	1	+2	7	2026 FIFA U-17 World Cup
2	El Salvador	3	2	0	1	9	4	+5	6	
3	Belize	3	0	2	1	3	5	−2	2	
4	Curaçao	3	0	1	2	3	8	−5	1	

Source: CONCACAF
Rules for classification: Tiebreakers

=== Group G ===
Pos	Team	Pld	W	D	L	GF	GA	GD	Pts	Qualification
1	Jamaica	3	3	0	0	18	1	+17	9	2026 FIFA U-17 World Cup
2	Canada	3	2	0	1	9	4	+5	6	
3	Aruba	3	1	0	2	4	9	−5	3	
4	Cayman Islands	3	0	0	3	1	18	−17	0	

Source: CONCACAF
Rules for classification: Tiebreakers

=== Group H ===
Pos	Team	Pld	W	D	L	GF	GA	GD	Pts	Qualification
1	Honduras (H)	2	2	0	0	6	2	+4	6	2026 FIFA U-17 World Cup
2	Guyana	2	1	0	1	3	4	−1	3	
3	Bermuda	2	0	0	2	0	3	−3	0	
4	Suriname	0	0	0	0	0	0	0	0	Withdrew

Source: CONCACAF
Rules for classification: Tiebreakers
(H) Hosts

== Qualified teams for FIFA U-17 World Cup ==
The following teams from CONCACAF qualified for the 2026 FIFA U-17 World Cup in Qatar.

The United States team subsequently withdrew on 11 November 2026, citing security concerns, and were replaced the following day by the Dominican Republic team.

Team	Qualified on	Previous appearances in FIFA U-17 World Cup^{1}
Costa Rica	10 February 2026	11 (1985, 1995, 1997, 2001, 2003, 2005, 2007, 2009, 2015, 2017, 2025)
Haiti	10 February 2026	3 (2007, 2019, 2025)
Panama	10 February 2026	4 (2011, 2013, 2023, 2025)
~~United States~~	10 February 2026	19 (1985, 1987, 1989, 1991, 1993, 1995, 1997, 1999, 2001, 2003, 2005, 2007, 2009, 2011, 2015, 2017, 2019, 2023, 2025)
Cuba	11 February 2026	2 (1989, 1991)
Honduras	11 February 2026	6 (2007, 2009, 2013, 2015, 2017, 2025)
Jamaica	11 February 2026	2 (1999, 2011)
Mexico	12 February 2026	16 (1985, 1987, 1991, 1993, 1997, 1999, 2003, **2005**, 2009, **2011**, 2013, 2015, 2017, 2019, 2023, 2025)
Dominican Republic	12 November 2026 (Note: replaced the United States team who withdrew)	Debut

^{1} Bold indicates champions for that year. Italic indicates hosts for that year.
