= Wyn Belotte =

Canadian football player

Personal information
- Date of birth: May 6, 1984 (age 42)
- Place of birth: Montreal, Quebec, Canada
- Height: 1.91 m (6 ft 3 in)
- Position: Striker

Youth career
- CS Montréal-Nord/Bourassa
- 1998–2002: Nantes

Senior career*
Years	Team	Apps	(Gls)
2002	IFK Norrköping	1	(0)
2002	→ Ängelholms FF (loan)	3	(0)
2003	Wisła Kraków II	4	(5)
2005	Toronto Lynx	8	(2)

International career
2000–2001	Canada U17	12	(6)
2001–2003	Canada U20	14	(4)
- * Club domestic league appearances and goals

Wyn Belotte (born May 6, 1984) is a Canadian former professional soccer player who played as a striker.

== Career ==
At age 14, Belotte left Canada to train at Rennes and with the Nantes youth system. He was signed by IFK Norrköping in 2002. In the 2003–04 season, Belotte was signed by Polish club Wisła Kraków, where he played in the reserve team.

In 2005, he returned to his native country and signed with the Toronto Lynx of the USL First Division. His signing was announced on June 21, 2005 along with newly acquired striker Said Ali, and league veteran Chris Williams. He made his debut for the club on June 24, 2005 in a match against the Minnesota Thunder, where he recorded his first goal of the season with the club as well as registering an assist in a 2–1 victory. Belotte's contribution in the match marked the Lynx's first victory for the 2005 season. He would score his second of the season two weeks later in a 2–1 victory over the Seattle Sounders.

After the acquisition of Belotte, the Lynx managed a 4-game undefeated streak, but unfortunately the Lynx performed poorly throughout the 2005 season by finishing last in the overall standings.

== International career ==
Belotte played in 2003 FIFA World Youth Championship for Canada as well as appearing at the 2001 FIFA World Youth Championship.

Belotte played 2010 futsal at the QCSL World Cup.

== Personal life ==
Both of his parents come from Haiti and his uncle André is former member of the Canada national under-16 soccer team.
