= Berny Burke =

Costa Rican footballer (born 1996)

Personal information
- Full name: Berny Thomas Burke Montiel
- Date of birth: 16 March 1996 (age 30)
- Place of birth: Guápiles, Costa Rica
- Height: 1.75 m (5 ft 9 in)
- Position: Right winger

Team information
- Current team: Sporting San José

Youth career
- –2013: Santos de Guápiles

Senior career*
Years	Team	Apps	(Gls)
2013–2016	Santos de Guápiles	46	(2)
2016–2018	Santa Clara	36	(0)
2018	→ Santos de Guápiles (loan)	2	(0)
2018–2021	Herediano	92	(6)
2022–	Sporting San José	15	(0)

International career
2012–2013	Costa Rica U17	6	(2)
2014	Costa Rica U20	1	(1)
2015	Costa Rica U23	3	(0)
- * Club domestic league appearances and goals as of 12:41, 2 June 2022 (UTC)

Berny Thomas Burke Montiel (born 16 March 1996) is a Costa Rican professional footballer who plays as a right winger for Liga FPD club Sporting San José.

== Club career ==
Burke started his career at hometown club Santos de Guápiles and made his professional debut on 23 April 2014, in a Costa Rican Primera División match against CF Universidad de Costa Rica.

On 30 June 2016, Burke agreed a two-year deal with C.D. Santa Clara.
