= 2009 CONCACAF U-17 Championship =

Association football tournament for under-17 national teams

Tournament details
- Host country: Mexico
- City: Tijuana, Baja California
- Dates: April 21–26
- Teams: 8 (from 1 confederation)
- Venue: 1 (in 1 host city)

Tournament statistics
- Matches played: 12
- Goals scored: 44 (3.67 per match)
- Attendance: 81,999 (6,833 per match)
- Top scorer: (United States) Jack McInerney (5)

The 2009 CONCACAF U17 Championship was the football championship tournament for under-17 in the CONCACAF region (North America, Central America and the Caribbean), and was formatted to determine the four CONCACAF representatives to advance to the 2009 FIFA U-17 World Cup in Nigeria. The 8-team tournament was originally scheduled to be played from April 21 to May 2 and hosted by Mexico at the Estadio Caliente in Tijuana. However, the tournament was cancelled on April 27 due to the swine flu outbreak in Mexico. At the time that the tournament was cancelled the group stage had already been played, and the four teams who could qualify to the U-17 World Cup – Costa Rica, Honduras, Mexico, and the United States – had already done so.

== Teams ==
Region	Qualification Tournament	Qualifiers
Caribbean (CFU)	2008 CFU Youth Cup	Cuba; Trinidad and Tobago
Central America (UNCAF)	2009 Central American U-17 qualifying tournament	Costa Rica; Guatemala; Honduras
North America (NAFU)	Automatically qualified	Canada; Mexico; United States

== Venues ==
Tijuana
Estadio Caliente
Capacity: 27,333
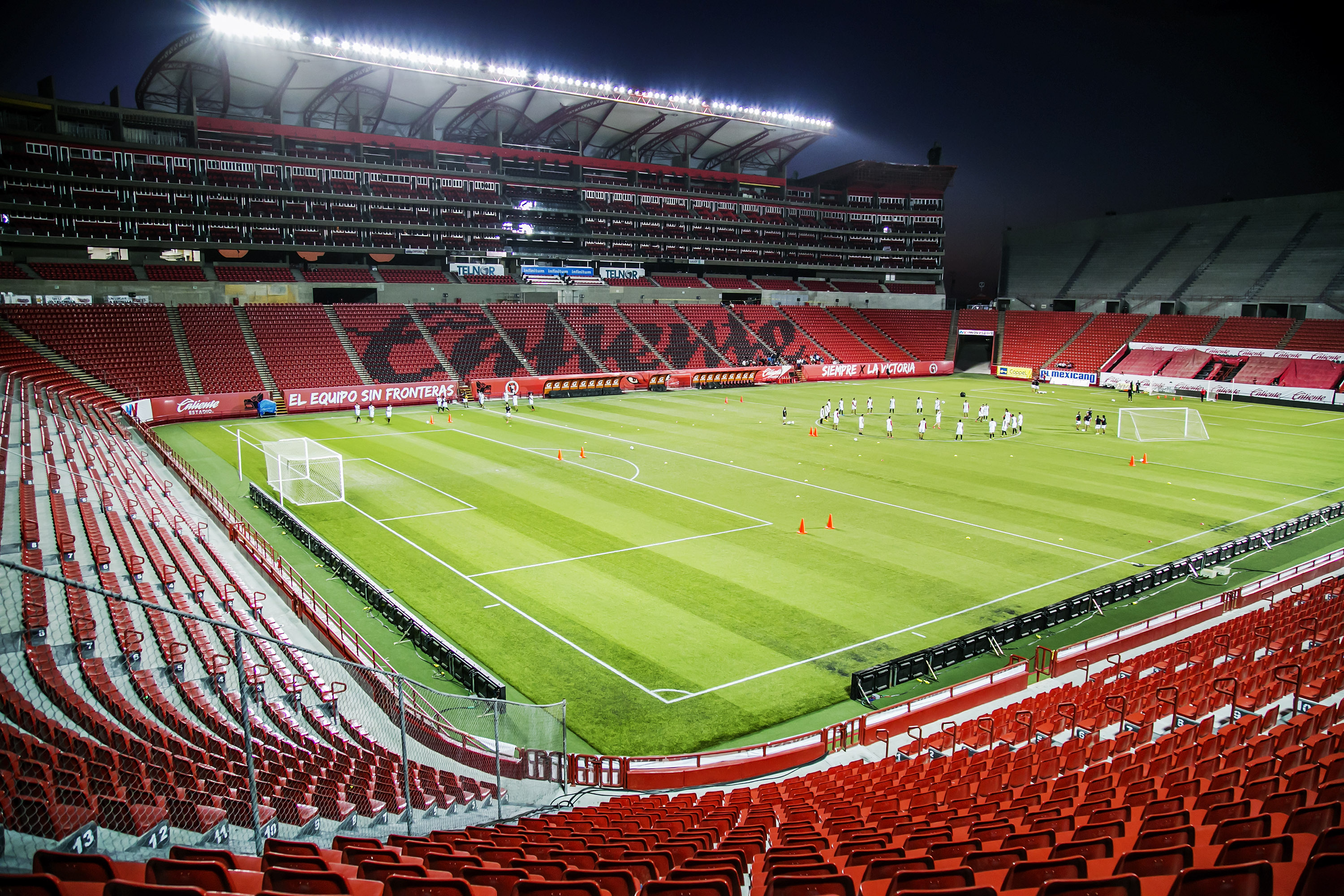

== Group stage ==
The groups were drawn at the CONCACAF headquarters on January 15, 2009. The match schedule for the groups and final rounds were announced two weeks later. The top two teams from each group will advance to the semifinals.

=== Group A ===
Team	Pld	W	D	L	GF	GA	GD	Pts
United States	3	3	0	0	12	2	+10	9
Honduras	3	1	1	1	7	4	+3	4
Cuba	3	1	0	2	2	12	−10	3
Canada	3	0	1	2	4	7	−3	1

21 April 2009
13:30 PDT

Honduras	1 – 1	Canada
Lozano 60'	Report	Teibert 40' (pen.)

Estadio Caliente, Tijuana
Attendance: 4,000
Referee: Francisco Chacón (Mexico)
21 April 2009
16:00 PDT

Cuba	0 – 5	United States
	Report	Jerome 29'; McInerney 33' 47'; Lletget 37'; Gil 61'

Estadio Caliente, Tijuana
Attendance: 4,000
Referee: Raymond Bogle (Jamaica)

23 April 2009
13:30 PDT

Honduras	6 – 0	Cuba
Rivera 18'; Tobías 30'; Lozano 43' (pen.) 73' 83'; Martínez 67'	Report

Estadio Caliente, Tijuana
Attendance: 4,000
Referee: Hugo Cruz (Costa Rica)
23 April 2009
16:00 PDT

United States	4 – 2	Canada
McInerney 4' (pen.) 31'; Lletget 40'; Gyau 85'	Report	Hoilett 70'; Jackson 86'

Estadio Caliente, Tijuana
Attendance: 4,000
Referee: Paul Delgadillo (Mexico)

25 April 2009
16:00 PDT

Canada	1 – 2	Cuba
Maheu 81'	Report	Lahera 87' (pen.) 90+2'

Estadio Caliente, Tijuana
Attendance: 5,000
Referee: David España (Guatemala)
25 April 2009
16:00 PDT

United States	3 – 0	Honduras
Palodichuk 28' 45'; McInerney 36'	Report

Estadio Caliente, Tijuana
Attendance: 5,000
Referee: Stanley Lancaster (Guyana)

=== Group B ===
Team	Pld	W	D	L	GF	GA	GD	Pts
Mexico	3	3	0	0	11	0	+11	9
Costa Rica	3	1	1	1	4	2	+2	4
Guatemala	3	1	1	1	4	4	0	4
Trinidad and Tobago	3	0	0	3	0	13	−13	0

22 April 2009
13:30 PDT

Guatemala	1 – 1	Costa Rica
Ceballos 75'	Report	Campbell 38'

Estadio Caliente, Tijuana
Attendance: 4,000
Referee: Stanley Lancaster (Guyana)
22 April 2009
16:00 PDT

Mexico	7 – 0	Trinidad and Tobago
Campos 5'; Galván 24' (pen.) 48' 64'; Mañon 29'; Télles 52' (pen.); Jasso 83'	Report

Estadio Caliente, Tijuana
Attendance: 13,333
Referee: Trevor Taylor (Barbados)

24 April 2009
13:30 PDT

Costa Rica	3 – 0	Trinidad and Tobago
Campbell 14'; Bustos 18'; Mayorga 37'	Report

Estadio Caliente, Tijuana
Attendance: 4,000
Referee: Luis Rodríguez (Panama)
24 April 2009
16:00 PDT

Mexico	3 – 0	Guatemala
K. Álvarez 41' 70'; Campos 86' (pen.)	Report

Estadio Caliente, Tijuana
Attendance: 13,333
Referee: Marlón Mejía (México)

26 April 2009
13:30 PDT

Trinidad and Tobago	0 – 3	Guatemala
	Report	Navas 37'; Herrate 38'; Lima 69'

Estadio Caliente, Tijuana
Attendance: 8,000
Referee: Gerald Henry (Belize)
26 April 2009
16:00 PDT

Mexico	1 – 0	Costa Rica
Mora 61' (o.g.)	Report

Estadio Caliente, Tijuana
Attendance: 13,333
Referee: Raymond Bogle (Jamaica)

== Championship round ==
The four teams to qualify for the semifinals were automatically qualified to the World Cup. The championship round, however, was not played because it was cancelled due to a swine flu outbreak. The four qualifiers are:

- Costa Rica
- Honduras
- Mexico
- United States

== Goal scorers ==
5 goals

- (United States) Jack McInerney

4 goals

- (Honduras) Anthony Lozano

3 goals

- (Mexico) Martín Galván

2 goals

- (Costa Rica) Joel Campbell
- (Cuba) Yaudel Lahera Garcia
- (Mexico) Kristian Álvarez
- (Mexico) Carlos Campos
- (United States) Sebastian Lletget

2 goals (continued)

- (United States) Nicholas Palodichuk

1 goal

- (Canada) Jaineil Hoilett
- (Canada) Coulton Jackson
- (Canada) Justin Maheu
- (Canada) Russell Teibert
- (Costa Rica) Juan Bustos
- (Costa Rica) Rosbin Mayorga
- (Guatemala) Marvin Ceballos
- (Guatemala) Kendel Herrate
- (Guatemala) Gerson Lima
- (Guatemala) Gabriel Navas

1 goal (continued)

- (Honduras) Nestor Nahum Martínez
- (Honduras) Johny Rivera
- (Honduras) José Danilo Tobías
- (Mexico) Víctor Mañon
- (Mexico) Salvador Jasso
- (Mexico) Luis Télles
- (United States) Luis Gil
- (United States) Joseph Gyau
- (United States) Stefan Jerome

Own goal

- (Costa Rica) Adrian Mora (for Mexico)

== See also ==
- CONCACAF Under-17 Championship
- FIFA U-17 World Cup
