= 2011 CONCACAF U-17 Championship =

Association football tournament for under-17 national teams

Campeonato Sub-17 CONCACAF 2011 (in Spanish)

Tournament details
- Host country: Jamaica
- Dates: 14–27 February
- Teams: 12 (from 1 confederation)
- Venue: 2 (in 1 host city)

Final positions
- Champions: United States (3rd title)
- Runners-up: Canada
- Third place: Panama
- Fourth place: Jamaica

Tournament statistics
- Matches played: 19
- Goals scored: 49 (2.58 per match)
- Attendance: 38,181 (2,010 per match)
- Top scorer(s): (Costa Rica) John Jairo Ruiz (Jamaica) Jason Wright (United States) Andrew Oliver (4 goals each)
- Best player: (United States) Andrew Souders

The 2011 CONCACAF U-17 Championship determined the four CONCACAF representatives to advance to the 2011 FIFA U-17 World Cup in Mexico. Jamaica staged the championship between 14 and 27 February.

The United States defeated Canada 3–0 in the final to claim their third championship.

== Qualified teams ==
Region	Qualification Tournament	Qualifiers
Caribbean (CFU)	Caribbean zone	Barbados; Trinidad and Tobago; Cuba; Jamaica (hosts); Haiti
Central America (UNCAF)	Central American Zone	Costa Rica; El Salvador; Honduras; Panama; Guatemala
North America (NAFU)	Automatically qualified	Canada; United States

Mexico did not participate.

== Draw ==
The draw for the final tournament took place on December 15 in Montego Bay, Jamaica, dividing the 12 sides into four, three-team groups.

Due to a decision of the CONCACAF Youth Championships Committee, Pot 1 was reconfigured from the original announcement. Honduras, which had qualified for each of the previous two World Cups, will replace Canada in Pot 1, which also will include the United States, host Jamaica and Costa Rica.

Canada was moved to Pot 2 with Central American sides El Salvador, Guatemala and Panama.

Pot 1	Pot 2	Pot 3
Jamaica; United States; Honduras; Costa Rica	El Salvador; Guatemala; Canada; Panama	Cuba; Trinidad and Tobago; Haiti; Barbados

== Venues ==
The tournament was hosted in two host cities. Trelawny was dropped after an inspection by CONCACAF four days before the tournament was due to begin, because there was no grass.

Montego Bay	Montego Bay
Jarrett Park	Catherine Hall Stadium
Capacity: 4,000	Capacity: 8,000

== Group stage ==
All times are local time – UTC−05:00

=== Group A ===
Team	Pld	W	D	L	GF	GA	GD	Pts
Costa Rica	2	2	0	0	6	3	+3	6
El Salvador	2	1	0	1	5	3	+2	3
Haiti	2	0	0	2	1	6	−5	0

14 February 2011
12:30

Haiti	1–3	Costa Rica
Chéry 23'	Report	Quirós 22'; Leiva 43'; Ruiz 47'

Catherine Hall Stadium, Montego Bay
Attendance: 200
Referee: Juan Carlos Guerra (Guatemala)

16 February 2011
12:30

El Salvador	3–0 Awarded^{1}	Haiti
	Report

Jarrett Park, Montego Bay

18 February 2011
12:30

Costa Rica	3–2	El Salvador
Ruiz 16', 45+2', 73'	Report	Iraheta 32'; Mejía 47'

Jarrett Park, Montego Bay
Referee: Kenville Holder (Cayman Islands)

^{1} Haiti could not field a team for the match against El Salvador due to player illness; El Salvador was awarded with a 3–0 win.

=== Group B ===
Team	Pld	W	D	L	GF	GA	GD	Pts
United States	2	2	0	0	4	1	+3	6
Panama	2	0	1	1	0	1	−1	1
Cuba	2	0	1	1	1	3	−2	1

14 February 2011
15:00

Cuba	1–3	United States
López 68'	Report	Koroma 27'; Oliver 46'; S. Rodriguez 51'

Catherine Hall Stadium, Montego Bay
Attendance: 548
Referee: Enrico Wijngaarde (Suriname)

16 February 2011
15:00

Panama	0–0	Cuba
	Report

Jarrett Park, Montego Bay
Attendance: 261
Referee: Paul Ward (Canada)

18 February 2011
15:00

United States	1–0	Panama
Oliver 49'	Report

Jarrett Park, Montego Bay
Attendance: 290
Referee: Enrico Wijngaarde (Suriname)

=== Group C ===
Team	Pld	W	D	L	GF	GA	GD	Pts
Jamaica	2	1	1	0	3	2	+1	4
Trinidad and Tobago	2	1	1	0	3	2	+1	4
Guatemala	2	0	0	2	0	2	−2	0

- CONCACAF held a draw tiebreaker to determine the group winner, which was won by Jamaica.
15 February 2011
15:00

Jamaica	2–2	Trinidad and Tobago
Wright 41'; Lewis 77'	Report	Henry 56', 63'

Catherine Hall Stadium, Montego Bay
Attendance: 4,400
Referee: Ricardo Arellano (Mexico)

17 February 2011
15:00

Guatemala	0–1	Trinidad and Tobago
	Report	Noel 90'

Jarrett Park, Montego Bay
Attendance: 600
Referee: Trevor Taylor (Barbados)

19 February 2011
15:30

Jamaica	1–0	Guatemala
Wright 45'	Report

Catherine Hall Stadium, Montego Bay
Attendance: 6,563
Referee: Elmer Bonilla (El Salvador)

=== Group D ===
Team	Pld	W	D	L	GF	GA	GD	Pts
Canada	2	1	1	0	8	0	+8	4
Honduras	2	1	1	0	2	1	+1	4
Barbados	2	0	0	2	1	10	−9	0

15 February 2011
12:30

Barbados	1–2	Honduras
Prescod 15'	Report	Róchez 62'; Velásquez 90'

Catherine Hall Stadium, Montego Bay
Attendance: 4,400
Referee: Hugo Cruz Alvarado (Costa Rica)

17 February 2011
12:30

Canada	8–0	Barbados
Petrasso 12', 29', 56'; Jalali 14'; Nanco 23'; Alemán 33', 47'; Cain 73'	Report

Jarrett Park, Montego Bay
Attendance: 400
Referee: Jafeth Perea (Panama)

19 February 2011
12:30

Honduras	0–0	Canada
	Report

Catherine Hall Stadium, Montego Bay
Attendance: 1,500
Referee: Valdin Legister (Jamaica)

== Knockout stage ==
Quarter-finals
22 February — Montego Bay
Costa Rica	0
Panama	1
23 February — Montego Bay
Canada	2
Trinidad and Tobago	0
22 February — Montego Bay
United States (a.e.t.)	3
El Salvador	2
23 February — Montego Bay
Jamaica	2
Honduras	1

Semi-finals
25 February — Montego Bay
Panama	0
Canada	1
25 February — Montego Bay
United States	2
Jamaica	0

Final
27 February — Montego Bay
Canada	0
United States (a.e.t.)	3
Third place
27 February — Montego Bay
Panama	1
Jamaica	0

All times are local time – UTC−05:00

=== Quarter-finals ===
22 February 2011
12:00

Costa Rica	0–1	Panama
	Report	Stephens 76'

Catherine Hall Stadium, Montego Bay
Attendance: 228
Referee: Ricardo Arellano (Mexico)

22 February 2011
15:00

United States	3–2 (a.e.t.)	El Salvador
Guido 4'; M. Rodríguez 96'; Pelosi 112'	Report	Peña 8'; Iraheta 120' (pen.)

Catherine Hall Stadium, Montego Bay
Referee: Valdin Legister (Jamaica)

23 February 2011
12:00

Canada	2–0	Trinidad and Tobago
Nanco 15'; Alemán 20'	Report

Catherine Hall Stadium, Montego Bay
Attendance: 300
Referee: Elmer Bonilla (El Salvador)

23 February 2011
15:00

Jamaica	2–1	Honduras
Wright 13', 46'	Report	Rochez 65'

Catherine Hall Stadium, Montego Bay
Attendance: 5,600
Referee: Enrico Wijngaarde (Suriname)

=== Semi-finals ===
25 February 2011
16:00

Panama	0–1	Canada
	Report	Gasparotto 8'

Catherine Hall Stadium, Montego Bay
Attendance: 2,000
Referee: Trevor Taylor (Barbados)

25 February 2011
19:00

United States	2–0	Jamaica
Pelosi 10'; Oliver 90+2'	Report

Catherine Hall Stadium, Montego Bay
Attendance: 8,361
Referee: Ricardo Arellano (Mexico)

=== Third place match ===
27 February 2011
16:00

Panama	1–0	Jamaica
Browne 36'	Report

Catherine Hall Stadium, Montego Bay
Attendance: 1,400
Referee: Elmer Bonilla (El Salvador)

=== Final ===
27 February 2011
19:00

Canada	0–3 (a.e.t.)	United States
	Report	Smith 92'; Oliver 100'; Koroma 120'

Catherine Hall Stadium, Montego Bay
Attendance: 1,130
Referee: Enrico Wijngaarde (Suriname)

== Winners ==
2011 CONCACAF U-17 Championship

United States
First title

The U.S. has won the CONCACAF championship twice at this level, in 1983 and 1992,
but because those were U-16 events, the U.S. has technically never won the CONCACAF U-17 Championship.
When the qualifying tournament was held as two groups in separate venues, the U.S. won its group three times (2001, 2003, 2005).

== Goalscorers ==
4 goals

- (Costa Rica) John Jairo Ruiz
- (Jamaica) Jason Wright
- (United States) Andrew Oliver

3 goals

- (Canada) Keven Alemán
- (Canada) Michael Petrasso

2 goals

- (Canada) Chris Nanco
- (El Salvador) Gerardo Iraheta
- (Honduras) Bryan Róchez
- (Trinidad and Tobago) Shackeil Henry
- (United States) Alfred Koroma
- (United States) Marc Pelosi

1 goal

- (Barbados) Zari Prescod
- (Canada) Wesley Cain
- (Canada) Luca Gasparotto
- (Canada) Sadi Jalali
- (Costa Rica) Gabriel Leiva
- (Costa Rica) William Quirós
- (Cuba) Frank López
- (El Salvador) Rommel Mejía
- (El Salvador) José Peña
- (Haiti) Johnley Chéry
- (Honduras) Eder Yair Velásquez
- (Jamaica) Andre Lewis
- (Panama) Omar Browne
- (Panama) Alfredo Stephens
- (Trinidad and Tobago) Adan Noel
- (United States) Alejandro Guido
- (United States) Mario Rodríguez
- (United States) Stevie Rodriguez
- (United States) Nathan Smith

== Countries to participate in 2011 FIFA U-17 World Cup ==
The top four teams qualified for the 2011 FIFA U-17 World Cup.

- United States
- Canada
- Panama
- Jamaica
