= Stefan Jerome =

American soccer player (born 1992)

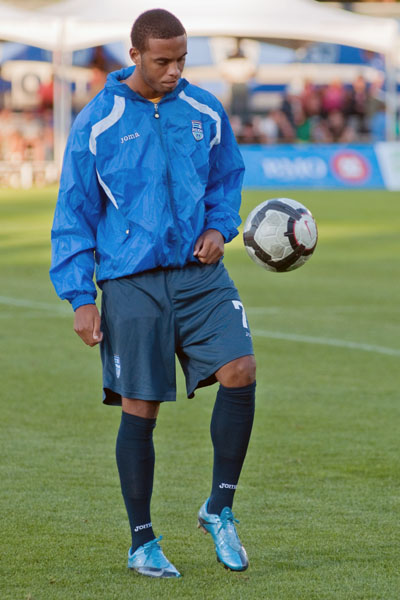

Personal information
- Date of birth: August 11, 1992 (age 34)
- Place of birth: Davie, Florida, United States
- Height: 6 ft 0 in (1.83 m)
- Position: Forward

Youth career
- 2007–2009: IMG Academy

Senior career*
Years	Team	Apps	(Gls)
2010–2012	Fort Lauderdale Strikers	7	(0)
2011	→ Sigma Olomouc (loan)	5	(0)
2012	→ Nyköpings BIS (loan)	9	(1)

International career^{‡}
2009	United States U17	16	(5)
- * Club domestic league appearances and goals as of June 28, 2013 ‡ National team caps and goals as of October 21, 2010

Stefan Jerome (born August 11, 1992, in Davie, Florida) is an American soccer player. He played for Sigma Olomouc in the Gambrinus Liga in 2011.

== Background ==
Jerome was born in Davie, Florida and is of Haitian descent.

== Career ==
=== Club ===
Jerome attended American Heritage High School, who he led to the 2007 Florida High School Athletic Association's Class 3A title game, played club soccer for West Pines FC in Pembroke Pines, Florida and Schulz Academy program in Boca Raton Florida until he was invited to attend the residency program, and spent two years in US soccer residency program at the famed IMG Academy in Bradenton, Florida, before being signed by Miami FC in June 2010. At the time of his signing he was the youngest player in Miami FC team history.

He made his professional debut on June 19, 2010, as a substitute in a 3–1 loss to the Austin Aztex.

After trialling with Sigma Olomouc in January 2011, Jerome signed on loan with the club until the end of the 2010–11 season.

=== International ===
Jerome has been an active member of the US youth national teams and was on the team that played at the 2009 FIFA U-17 World Cup in Nigeria. He has also received callups for the U-20 team camp and also played with the U-20 men's at the 2010 Copa Chivas tournament.
