= Edward Acevedo =

Edward Acevedo may refer to:

- Edward Acevedo (footballer) (born 1985), Dominican footballer
- Edward Acevedo (politician) (born 1963), American politician

== See also ==
- Eduardo Acevedo (disambiguation)
