= Gabriel Leiva =

Costa Rican footballer (born 1994)

Personal information
- Full name: Gabriel Fernando Leiva Rojas
- Date of birth: 27 August 1994 (age 32)
- Place of birth: Turrialba, Costa Rica
- Height: 1.85 m (6 ft 1 in)
- Position: Midfielder

Team information
- Current team: Sporting
- Number: 6

Youth career
- –2011: Deportivo Saprissa

Senior career*
| Years | Team | Apps | (Gls) |
| 2011–2012 | Deportivo Saprissa | 0 | (0) |
| 2012–2013 | River Plate B | | |
| 2013–2015 | Cartaginés | 15 | (0) |
| 2015 | Carmelita | 16 | (1) |
| 2016 | Cartaginés | 5 | (0) |
| 2016–2017 | Patriotas | 2 | (0) |
| 2017–2018 | Turrialba | | |
| 2018 | Malacateco | 20 | (4) |
| 2019 | Jicaral | 20 | (3) |
| 2020–2022 | Pérez Zeledón | 92 | (16) |
| 2023 | Herediano | 6 | (0) |
| 2023 | → San Carlos (loan) | 21 | (4) |
| 2024 | San Carlos | 35 | (7) |
| 2025 | Liberia | 37 | (3) |
| 2026 | Olancho | 14 | (1) |
| 2026– | Sporting | 16 | (5) |

International career^{‡}
| 2011 | Costa Rica U17 | 3 | (1) |
| 2013 | Costa Rica U20 | 2 | (0) |
| 2015 | Costa Rica U23 | 1 | (0) |
| 2026– | Costa Rica | 1 | (0) |
- * Club domestic league appearances and goals as of 7 November 2026 ‡ National team caps and goals as of 17 November 2026

Gabriel Fernando Leiva Rojas (born 27 August 1994) is a Costa Rican football midfielder who plays for Liga FPD club Sporting and the Costa Rica national team. Standing at 1.85m tall, he is physically strong, left-footed, and can be deployed as a full-back.

== Career ==
=== River Plate ===
Joining Argentinean giants River Plate in 2012 and becoming the first Costa Rican to play there in the process, the midfielder was to be in their reserve team until he turned 18, which would then allow him to be registered in their senior squad.

=== Czech Republic ===
In September 2014, Cartagines agreed to let Leiva test for with Czech club 1. FC Slovácko, with the trial ending on August 31. Playing three practice matches there, he scored 6 goals, with 1. FC Slovácko asking him to return by the end of his try-out there. The Costa Rican left in January 2015 for his second trial in the Czech Republic.

=== Patriotas Boyacá ===
Penning a three-year deal with Patriotas Boyacá of the Colombian Categoria Premier A in summer 2016, Leiva expressed benevolence at the opportunity, recording his first outing for the club in a 0–0 draw with Atlético Bucaramanga, entering in the 63rd minute.

== International career ==
Leiva made his debut for the Costa Rica national team on 17 November 2026 in a friendly against Argentina, substituting Celso Borges in the 68th minute of a 0–7 loss.
