= Ian Charles =

British scientist

Ian Charles OBE is Director of the Quadram Institute in Norwich, UK. The Institute combines Quadram Institute Bioscience (the former Biotechnology and Biological Sciences Research Council (BBSRC) Institute of Food Research) and the endoscopy centre of the Norfolk and Norwich University Hospitals NHS Foundation Trust. It is closely allied with the University of East Anglia and the BBSRC. Charles' field of research is infectious diseases and the microbiome and its impact on health and well-being.

Charles was an awarded an OBE in 2023.

== Career ==
Charles was a visiting professor at the University of Technology in Sydney. He was also a professor of molecular biology at the University of Sheffield, and became the founding member of the Wolfson Institute for BioMedical Research at University College London in 19951.

Charles founded two companies that discovers drugs against infection; Arrow Therapeutics sold to AstraZeneca in 2007, and Auspherix founded in 2013.

== Selected publications ==
Charles' research interests lie in the areas of infectious diseases and the microbiome and their impact on human health.

- Micro-Patterned Surfaces That Exploit Stigmergy to Inhibit Biofilm Expansion (2017)
- A genomic island in Vibrio cholerae with VPI-1 site-specific recombination characteristics contains CRISPR-Cas and type VI secretion modules. (2016)
- Genomic Microbial Epidemiology Is Needed to Comprehend the Global Problem of Antibiotic Resistance and to Improve Pathogen Diagnosis (2016)
- Bacterial Communities Vary between Sinuses in Chronic Rhinosinusitis Patients (2016)
- Coordinating Bacterial Cell Division with Nutrient Availability: a Role for Glycolysis (2014)
- Comparative genomic analysis of a multiple antimicrobial resistant enterotoxigenic E. coli O157 lineage from Australian pigs (2015)
