= 1994 CONCACAF U-17 Tournament =

Association football tournament for under-17 national teams

1994 CONCACAF U-16 Championship
Tournament details
- Host country: El Salvador
- City: San Salvador; Santa Ana
- Dates: 2–13 November
- Teams: 12
- Venue(s): Estadio Jorge "El Mágico" González; Estadio Óscar Quiteño; Estadio Cuscatlán

Final positions
- Champions: Costa Rica
- Runners-up: United States
- Third place: Canada
- Fourth place: Mexico

The 1994 CONCACAF U-16 Championship was a North American international association football tournament, it determined the 1995 FIFA U-17 World Championship entrants from the CONCACAF region. The 1994 edition of the competition was held in El Salvador.

== First round ==
=== Group 1 ===
Team	Pld	W	D	L	GF	GA	Pts
Canada	3	3	0	0	14	0	9
El Salvador	3	1	1	1	4	5	4
Jamaica	3	1	1	1	3	4	4
Nicaragua	3	0	0	3	3	15	0

2 November 1994

Canada	10-0	Nicaragua

Estadio Jorge "El Mágico" González, San Salvador
2 November 1994

El Salvador	1-1	Jamaica

Estadio Jorge "El Mágico" González, San Salvador

5 November 1994

Jamaica	0-2	Canada

Estadio Jorge "El Mágico" González, San Salvador
5 November 1994

El Salvador	3-2	Nicaragua

Estadio Jorge "El Mágico" González, San Salvador

6 November 1994

Nicaragua	1-2	Jamaica

Estadio Jorge "El Mágico" González, San Salvador
6 November 1994

El Salvador	0-2	Canada

Estadio Jorge "El Mágico" González, San Salvador

=== Group 2 ===
Team	Pld	W	D	L	GF	GA	Pts
Mexico	3	3	0	0	15	0	9
Dominican Republic	3	1	0	2	4	4	3
Honduras	3	1	0	2	5	11	3
Panama	3	1	0	2	4	13	3

2 November 1994

Honduras	5-2	Panama

Estadio Oscar Quiteño, Santa Ana
2 November 1994

Mexico	2-0	Dominican Republic

Estadio Oscar Quiteño, Santa Ana

4 November 1994

Mexico	7-0	Panama

Estadio Oscar Quiteño, Santa Ana
4 November 1994

Dominican Republic	3-0	Honduras

Estadio Oscar Quiteño, Santa Ana

6 November 1994

Panama	2-1	Dominican Republic

Estadio Oscar Quiteño, Santa Ana
6 November 1994

Honduras	0-6	Mexico

Estadio Oscar Quiteño, Santa Ana

=== Group 3 ===
Team	Pld	W	D	L	GF	GA	Pts
Costa Rica	3	3	0	0	16	2	9
United States	3	2	0	1	13	7	6
Trinidad and Tobago	3	0	1	2	6	14	1
Netherlands Antilles	3	0	1	2	2	14	1

3 November 1994

United States	7-0	Netherlands Antilles

Estadio Cuscatlán, San Salvador
4 November 1994

Costa Rica	7-1	Trinidad and Tobago

Estadio Cuscatlán, San Salvador

5 November 1994

Netherlands Antilles	0-5	Costa Rica

Estadio Cuscatlán, San Salvador
5 November 1994

Trinidad and Tobago	3-5	United States

Estadio Cuscatlán, San Salvador

7 November 1994

Netherlands Antilles	2-2	Trinidad and Tobago

Estadio Cuscatlán, San Salvador
7 November 1994

Costa Rica	4-1	United States

Estadio Cuscatlán, San Salvador

== Final round ==
Team	Pld	W	D	L	GF	GA	Pts
Costa Rica	3	2	0	1	6	3	6
United States	3	2	0	1	4	3	6
Canada	3	1	0	2	2	4	3
Mexico	3	1	0	2	2	4	3

9 November 1994

Costa Rica	1-2	United States

Estadio Jorge "El Mágico" González, San Salvador
9 November 1994

Mexico	0-1	Canada

Estadio Jorge "El Mágico" González, San Salvador

11 November 1994

United States	1-0	Canada

Estadio Jorge "El Mágico" González, San Salvador
11 November 1994

Costa Rica	2-0	Mexico

Estadio Jorge "El Mágico" González, San Salvador

13 November 1994

Canada	1-3	Costa Rica

Estadio Jorge "El Mágico" González, San Salvador
13 November 1994

Mexico	2-1	United States

Estadio Jorge "El Mágico" González, San Salvador

Canada, Costa Rica and USA qualified to the 1995 FIFA U-17 World Championship in Ecuador.
