= 2007 CONCACAF U17 Tournament =

Association football tournament for under-17 national teams

Tournament details
- Dates: 4 April to 6 May
- Teams: 9

Tournament statistics
- Matches played: 16
- Goals scored: 34 (2.13 per match)

The 2007 CONCACAF U17 Tournament was played in Honduras and Jamaica.

== Qualification ==
United States, Canada received automatic qualification to the finals. Honduras and Jamaica qualified as hosts. Nonetheless, Jamaica participated the CFU Youth Cup, which served as the qualification of the 2007 CONCACAF U17 Tournament for the Caribbean Zone.

== Group A ==
Team	Pld	W	D	L	GF	GA	GD	Pts
Haiti	3	1	2	0	4	1	+3	5
Honduras	3	1	2	0	2	1	+1	5
Mexico	3	0	3	0	2	2	0	3
El Salvador	3	0	1	2	2	6	−4	1

All games were played in Tegucigalpa, Honduras.

April 4, 2007
14:00

El Salvador	2–2	Mexico
Andrés Flores 18'; William Maldonado 50'		Andrés Rodríguez 20'; Jesús Cuevas 81'

Estadio Tiburcio Carías Andino, Tegucigalpa
Attendance: 13,482
Referee: (Costa Rica) Edgar Rodrígurz

April 4, 2007
16:00

Honduras	1–1	Haiti
Roger Rojas 18'		Jean Vobre 15'

Estadio Tiburcio Carías Andino, Tegucigalpa
Attendance: 13,482
Referee: (Jamaica) Dave Peterkin

April 6, 2007
14:00

Mexico	0–0	Haiti

Estadio Tiburcio Carías Andino, Tegucigalpa
Attendance: 3,000
Referee: (Trinidad and Tobago) Philip Jordan

April 6, 2007
16:00

Honduras	1–0	El Salvador
Julio Ocampo 60'

Estadio Tiburcio Carías Andino, Tegucigalpa
Attendance: 18,483
Referee: (United States) Ricardo Salazar

April 8, 2007
14:00

Haiti	3–0	El Salvador
Nomil Valdo 39'; Herold Charles 42'; Jean Vobre 78'

Estadio Tiburcio Carías Andino, Tegucigalpa
Attendance: 27,080
Referee: (Costa Rica) Egdar Rodríguez

April 8, 2007
16:00

Honduras	0–0	Mexico

Estadio Tiburcio Carías Andino, Tegucigalpa
Attendance: 27,080
Referee: (Guatemala) Walter López

== Group B ==
Team	Pld	W	D	L	GF	GA	GD	Pts
United States	4	3	0	1	9	5	+4	9
Costa Rica	4	2	1	1	4	2	+2	7
Trinidad and Tobago	4	2	0	2	3	6	−3	6
Canada	4	1	1	2	5	4	+1	4
Jamaica	4	1	0	3	3	7	−4	3

All games were played in Kingston, Jamaica.

April 28, 2007
17:00

Costa Rica	2–0	Trinidad and Tobago
Jorge Castro 70'; Diego Brenes 76'

National Stadium, Kingston
Attendance: 4,000
Referee: Roberto Garcia (MEX)

April 28, 2007
19:00

Jamaica	0–3	Canada
		Daniel Tannous 6'; Jarek Whiteman 42'; William Hyde 84'

National Stadium, Kingston
Attendance: 4,000
Referee: Luis Rodriguez (PAN)

April 30, 2007
17:00

Canada	0–0	Costa Rica

National Stadium, Kingston
Attendance: ?
Referee: Ruben Angela (ARU)

April 30, 2007
19:00

Trinidad and Tobago	0–3	United States
		Alex Nimo 2', 62'; Ellis McLoughlin 38'

National Stadium, Kingston
Attendance: ?
Referee: Elmer Bonillo (SLV)

May 2, 2007
17:00

United States	2–1	Canada
Billy Schuler 10'; Mykell Bates 23'		Cederic Carrie 54'

National Stadium, Kingston
Attendance: ?
Referee: Roberto Garcia (MEX)

May 2, 2007
19:00

Jamaica	0–1	Costa Rica
		Esteban Luna 66'

National Stadium, Kingston
Attendance: ?
Referee: Jose Guererro (NIC)

May 4, 2007
17:00

Canada	1–2	Trinidad and Tobago
Randy Edwini-Bonsu 46'		Leston Paul 4'; Stephen Knox 38'

National Stadium, Kingston
Attendance: ?
Referee: ?

May 4, 2007
19:00

Jamaica	3–2	United States
Shamari Brown 78'; Orgill Dever 82'; John Ross Doyley 91'		Sheanon Williams 15'; Alex Nimo 33'

National Stadium, Kingston
Attendance: ?
Referee: Luis Rodriguez (PAN)

May 6, 2007
17:00

United States	2–1	Costa Rica
Gregory Garza 13'; Ellis McLoughlin 20'		Marcos Urena 55'

National Stadium, Kingston
Attendance: 1,000
Referee: Elmer Bonillo (SLV)

May 6, 2007
19:00

Jamaica	0–1	Trinidad and Tobago
		Kevin Molino 13'

National Stadium, Kingston
Attendance: 1,000
Referee: José Guerrero (NCA)

== Qualified ==
- United States, Costa Rica, Haiti, Honduras and Trinidad and Tobago qualified to the 2007 FIFA U-17 World Cup in South Korea.
