= Dominican Republic national under-17 football team =

Dominican Republic U-17
- Association: Federación Dominicana de Fútbol
- Confederation: CONCACAF
- Head coach: Mariano Perez Tejada
- FIFA code: DOM
First colours	Second colours

FIFA U-17 World Cup
- Appearances: 1 (first in 2026)

The Dominican Republic national under-17 football team is the association football team that represents the nation of Dominican Republic at the under-17 level.

== Players ==
=== Current squad ===
The following 21 players were selected for the most recent fixtures in the 2026 CONCACAF U-17 World Cup qualification.

Head coach: Edward Acevedo

No.	Pos.	Player	Date of birth (age)	Club
1	GK	Aidan Betances	15 July 2009 (age 17)	(United States Soccer Federation) New York Red Bulls
12	GK	David Rosario	16 March 2010 (age 16)	
21	GK	Ian Herrera	1 April 2009 (age 17)	
5	DF	César Mena	14 January 2009 (age 17)	(Dominican Football Federation) Bauger
13	DF	Marcos Castillo	2 March 2009 (age 17)	
14	DF	Chaiel González	9 December 2009 (age 16)	(Dominican Football Federation) Atléticos Los Villanos
4	DF	Alejandro López	28 January 2009 (age 17)	(Royal Spanish Football Federation) Rayo Vallecano
3	DF	Gabriel Florentino	8 February 2009 (age 17)	(United States Soccer Federation) Inter Miami C.F.
2	MF	Daniel Fernández	4 March 2009 (age 17)	(Dominican Football Federation) Cibao F.C.
6	MF	Jorge Valenzuela	23 January 2009 (age 17)	
7	MF	Hugo González	13 November 2009 (age 17)	(United States Soccer Federation) Pennington Red Hawks
8	MF	Miguel Muñoz	5 October 2009 (age 17)	(Dominican Football Federation) Cibao F.C.
15	MF	Byron Matías	30 March 2009 (age 17)	(Swiss Football Association) FC Chur 97
16	MF	Marc García	25 February 2009 (age 17)	(Royal Spanish Football Federation) RCD Espanyol
18	MF	Jarol Ramos	31 March 2009 (age 17)	(Dominican Football Federation) Jarabacoa FC
20	MF	Junior Arias	16 November 2009 (age 17)	(Dominican Football Federation) Jarabacoa FC
17	MF	Kamil Castillo	3 January 2010 (age 16)	(United States Soccer Federation) D.C. United
9	FW	José Mejía	18 March 2010 (age 16)	(Royal Spanish Football Federation) Rayo Vallecano
10	FW	Adrián Jáquez (captain)	13 February 2009 (age 17)	(Royal Spanish Football Federation) CD Leganés
11	FW	Luis Almonte	1 May 2009 (age 17)	
19	FW	Justin Gómez	26 August 2009 (age 17)	(Dominican Football Federation) Real San Isidro

== FIFA U-17 World Cup record ==
Year	Round	GP	W	D*	L	GS	GA
FIFA Under-16 World Championship
(China) 1985	Did not qualify						
(Canada) 1987	Did not qualify						
(Scotland) 1989	Did not qualify						
(Italy) 1991	Did not qualify						
FIFA Under-17 World Championship
(Japan) 1993	Did not qualify						
(Ecuador) 1995	Did not qualify						
(Egypt) 1997	Did not qualify						
(New Zealand) 1999	Did not qualify						
(Trinidad and Tobago) 2001	Did not qualify						
(Finland) 2003	Did not qualify						
(Peru) 2005	Did not qualify						
FIFA Under-17 World Cup
(South Korea) 2007	Did not qualify						
(Nigeria) 2009	Did not qualify						
(Mexico) 2011	Did not qualify						
(United Arab Emirates) 2013	Did not qualify						
(Chile) 2015	Did not qualify						
(India) 2017	Did not qualify						
(Brazil) 2019	Did not qualify						
(Peru) ~~2021~~	Cancelled due to COVID-19 pandemic						
(Indonesia) 2023	Did not qualify						
(Qatar) 2025	Did not qualify						
(Qatar) 2026	In progress	1	0	1	0	1	1
(Qatar) 2027	To be determined						
(Qatar) 2028	To be determined						
(Qatar) 2029	To be determined						
Total:1/21	TBD	1	0	1	0	1	1

== See also ==
- Dominican Republic national football team
- Dominican Republic national under-23 football team
- Dominican Republic national under-20 football team
