= 2005 CONCACAF U17 Tournament =

Association football tournament for under-17 national teams

Tournament details
- Cities: Heredia & Culiacán
- Dates: 12 April – 21 May
- Teams: 8 (from 1 confederation)
- Venues: 2 (in 2 host cities)

Tournament statistics
- Matches played: 14
- Goals scored: 39 (2.79 per match)
- All statistics correct as of 2009-05-02.

The 2005 CONCACAF U17 Tournament was played in Costa Rica and Mexico.

== Final round ==
=== Group A ===
2 April 2005

El Salvador	0 - 3	United States
	Report	Soroka 18'; Nakazawa 28'; Zimmerman 87'

Estadio Eladio Rosabal Cordero, Heredia
Attendance: 250
Referee: (Guatemala) Elmar Rodas
2 April 2005

Costa Rica	3 - 0	Cuba
Solórzano 14' 56'; Guardia 42'	Report

Estadio Eladio Rosabal Cordero, Heredia
Attendance: 800
Referee: (Honduras) Lucinio Rodríguez

4 April 2005

Cuba	1 - 1	United States
Hernández 64'	Report	Nakazawa 1'

Estadio Eladio Rosabal Cordero, Heredia
Attendance: 1,000
Referee: (Panama) Rolando Vidal
4 April 2005

Costa Rica	2 - 1	El Salvador
García 29'; Sandoval 83'	Report	Escobar 47'

Estadio Eladio Rosabal Cordero, Heredia
Attendance: 1,000
Referee: (Mexico) Manuel Glower

6 April 2005

Cuba	2 - 2	El Salvador
Hernández 19'; Villegas 26'	Report	Serrano 43'; Flores 84'

Estadio Eladio Rosabal Cordero, Heredia
Attendance: 2,000
Referee: (Canada) Steven Del Piero
6 April 2005

Costa Rica	1 - 2	United States
Quesada 66'	Report	Besagno 10'; González 60'

Estadio Eladio Rosabal Cordero, Heredia
Attendance: 3,500
Referee: (Honduras) Lucinio Rodríguez

==== Standings ====
1	Team	P	W	D	L	F	A	PTS	+/-
1	United States	3	2	1	0	6	2	7	+4
2	Costa Rica	3	2	0	1	6	3	6	+3
3	Cuba	3	0	2	1	3	6	2	-3
4	El Salvador	3	0	1	2	3	7	1	-4

- USA qualified to the 2005 FIFA U-17 World Championship in Peru.
- Costa Rica forced to play against second place of Group B.

=== Group B ===
17 May 2005

Canada	0 - 2	Honduras
	Report	Avila 4'; Sánchez 43'

Estadio Carlos González, Culiacán
Attendance: 200
Referee: (United States) Ricardo Salazar
17 May 2005

Mexico	2 - 0	Haiti
Esparza 10'; Dos Santos 59'	Report

Estadio Carlos González, Culiacán
Attendance: 2,500
Referee: (Costa Rica) Alexandro Jiménez

19 May 2005

Canada	5 - 0	Haiti
Lammie 10' 67'; Pereira 31'; Beaulieu-Bourgault 45'; Haber 73'	Report

Estadio Carlos González, Culiacán
Attendance: 100
Referee: (El Salvador) Joel Aguilar
19 May 2005

Mexico	3 - 0	Honduras
Andrade 38'; Juárez 42' (pen); Dos Santos 46'	Report

Estadio Carlos González, Culiacán
Attendance: 950
Referee: (Costa Rica) Olguer Mejías

21 May 2005

Haiti	1 - 1	Honduras
Philistin 32'	Report	Sosa 58'

Estadio Carlos González, Culiacán
Attendance: 700
Referee: (Nicaragua) José René Guerrero
21 May 2005

Mexico	2 - 0	Canada
Villaluz 11'; Ever Guzmán 86'	Report

Estadio Carlos González, Culiacán
Attendance: 3,500
Referee: (United States) Ricardo Salazar

==== Standings ====
1	Team	P	W	D	L	F	A	PTS	+/-
1	Mexico	3	3	0	0	7	0	9	+7
2	Honduras	3	1	1	1	3	4	4	-1
3	Canada	3	1	0	2	5	4	3	+1
4	Haiti	3	0	1	2	1	8	1	-7

- Mexico qualified to the 2005 FIFA U-17 World Championship in Peru.
- Honduras forced to play against second place of Group A.

== Playoff ==
9 June 2005

Costa Rica	2 – 1	Honduras
Quesada 25'; Borges 27'		García 39'

Estadio Ricardo Saprissa Aymá, San José
Attendance: 1,073
Referee: (El Salvador) Joel Aguilar

3 July 2005

Honduras	1 – 1 (a.e.t.)	Costa Rica
Oliva 84'		Quesada 101'

Estadio Tiburcio Carías Andino, Tegucigalpa
Attendance: 25,000
Referee: (Guatemala) Rubén Castellanos
- Costa Rica won 3 - 2 on aggregate and qualified to the 2005 FIFA U-17 World Championship in Peru.
