= Nicaragua national under-17 football team =

National football team

Nicaragua Under 17
- Nickname(s): Los Pinoleros, Albiazules
- Association: Nicaraguan Football Federation
- Confederation: CONCACAF (North America)
- Head coach: (Nicaragua) Tyron Acevedo
- Captain: Ayel Palacios
- FIFA code: NCA
First colours	Second colours

First international
- Nicaragua 0–10 Canada (San Salvador, El Salvador; 2 November 1994)

Biggest win
- Nicaragua 5–0 U.S. Virgin Islands (Bradenton, United States; 20 March 2019); Nicaragua 5–0 Turks and Caicos Islands, (Managua, Nicaragua; 31 August 2022)

Biggest defeat
- Nicaragua 0–13 Guatemala (San Salvador, El Salvador; 16 November 2008)

CONCACAF Under-17 Championship
- Appearances: 3 (first in 1994)
- Best result: Round of 16 (2019, 2023)

FIFA U-17 World Cup
- Appearances: 0

The Nicaragua Under 17s football team, more commonly known as La Azulita, is controlled by Nicaraguan Football Federation and represents Nicaragua in international Under 17 or youth football competitions.

== Current players ==
The following 21 players were called up for the most recent fixtures in the 2026 CONCACAF U-17 World Cup qualification.

No.	Pos.	Player	Date of birth (age)	Club
1	GK	Jocksan Urbina	24 January 2010 (age 16)	(Nicaraguan Football Federation) Real Estelí
12	GK	Carlos Muñoz	14 February 2010 (age 16)	(Nicaraguan Football Federation) Diriangén
21	GK	Howard Castillo	3 May 2009 (age 17)	(Nicaraguan Football Federation) Real Estelí
2	DF	Elmer Inestroza	16 June 2009 (age 17)	(Nicaraguan Football Federation) Real Estelí
3	DF	Ariel González	13 January 2009 (age 17)	(Nicaraguan Football Federation) Real Estelí
4	DF	Eduardo Rodríguez (captain)	23 May 2009 (age 17)	(Nicaraguan Football Federation) Real Estelí
5	DF	Roger Toruño	6 February 2010 (age 16)	(Nicaraguan Football Federation) Xilotepelt FC
6	DF	Joshua Erazo	5 December 2009 (age 16)	(Nicaraguan Football Federation) Real Estelí
14	DF	Johansin Saravia	16 May 2009 (age 17)	(Nicaraguan Football Federation) Real Estelí
17	DF	Alejandro Buitrago	4 February 2009 (age 17)	(Royal Spanish Football Federation) Alcorcón
19	DF	Joel Soza	28 February 2009 (age 17)	(Canadian Soccer Association) CF Montréal
8	MF	Mario Montenegro	6 March 2009 (age 17)	(Nicaraguan Football Federation) Real Estelí
13	MF	Samuel Wilson	4 September 2009 (age 17)	(Nicaraguan Football Federation) Real Estelí
15	MF	Axel Calderón	28 March 2010 (age 16)	(Nicaraguan Football Federation) Managua
18	MF	Enrique Hernández	1 June 2010 (age 16)	(United States Soccer Federation) Houston Rangers
20	MF	Andrés Zavala	7 December 2009 (age 16)	(Nicaraguan Football Federation) Real Estelí
16	MF	Brayan Corea	23 October 2009 (age 17)	(Nicaraguan Football Federation) Sport Sébaco
10	FW	Edwin Zepeda	22 May 2009 (age 17)	(Nicaraguan Football Federation) Managua
7	FW	Sander Peralta	8 January 2009 (age 17)	(Nicaraguan Football Federation) Real Estelí
9	FW	Edgard Manzanares	2 July 2009 (age 17)	(Nicaraguan Football Federation) Real Estelí
11	FW	Nefstalí Campos	12 November 2009 (age 16)	(Nicaraguan Football Federation) Real Estelí

== Fixtures and results ==
legend

Win Draw Loss Fixture

== Competitive record ==
=== FIFA U-17 World Cup ===
FIFA U-17 World Cup Record
Hosts / Year	Result	Position	GP	W	D*	L	GS	GA
(China) 1985	Did not qualify							
(Canada) 1987	Did not qualify							
(Scotland) 1989	Did not qualify							
(Italy) 1991	Did not qualify							
(Japan) 1993	Did not qualify							
(Ecuador) 1995	Did not qualify							
(Egypt) 1997	Did not qualify							
(New Zealand) 1999	Did not qualify							
(Trinidad and Tobago) 2001	Did not qualify							
(Finland) 2003	Did not qualify							
(Peru) 2005	Did not qualify							
(South Korea) 2007	Did not qualify							
(Nigeria) 2009	Did not qualify							
(Mexico) 2011	Did not qualify							
(United Arab Emirates) 2013	Did not qualify							
(Chile) 2015	Did not qualify							
(India) 2017	Did not qualify							
(Brazil) 2019	Did not qualify							
(Indonesia) 2023	Did not qualify							
(Qatar) 2025	Did Not Qualify							
Total	1/20	-	0	0	0	0	0	0

=== CONCACAF U-17 Championship ===
CONCACAF U-17 Championship record
Year	Result	Position	Pld	W	D	L	GF	GA
(Trinidad and Tobago) 1983 to (Cuba) 1992	Did not enter							
(El Salvador) 1994	Group stage	12th	3	0	0	3	3	15
(Trinidad and Tobago) 1996 to (Panama) 2017	Did not qualify							
(United States) 2019	Round of 16	14th	1	0	0	1	1	2
(Guatemala) 2023	Round of 16	TBD	1	0	0	1	0	6
Total	0 Titles	-	5	0	0	5	4	23

*Draws include knockout matches decided on penalty kicks
