= 2025 CONCACAF Gold Cup squads =

International football tournament

The 2025 CONCACAF Gold Cup was an international football tournament that was held in the United States and Canada from 14 June to 6 July 2025. The sixteen participating national teams were required to register a squad of up to 26 players, of which three had to be goalkeepers. Only players in these squads were eligible to take part in the tournament.

Each national team had to submit a provisional list of up to sixty players (including at least five goalkeepers) to CONCACAF no later than thirty days prior to the start of the opening match of the tournament. The final list of up to 23 players per national team had to be submitted to CONCACAF by 5 June 2025, nine days before the opening match of the tournament. All players in the final list had to be chosen from the respective provisional list. In the event that a player on the submitted final list suffered a serious injury or presents medical reasons, he could be replaced until 24 hours before the kick-off of his team's first match of the tournament, provided that it was approved by the CONCACAF Medical Committee. After the end of the group stage, national teams that qualified for the knockout stage could also replace players in case of serious injury, confirmed by the CONCACAF Medical Committee, until 24 hours before the kick-off of their quarter-final match. In any case, the replacement player had to come from the provisional list and would be assigned the shirt number of the replaced player.

CONCACAF published the provisional lists on 19 May 2025. The final lists were released on 5 June 2025.

The age listed for each player is on 14 June 2025, the first day of the tournament. The numbers of caps and goals listed for each player do not include any matches played after the start of the tournament. The club listed is the club for which the player last played a competitive match before the tournament. (Note: This is the club a player was last able to play for during the previous season in the event a player did not play a competitive match.) The nationality for each club reflects the national association (not the league) to which the club is affiliated. A flag is included for coaches who are of a different nationality than their own national team.

== Group A ==
=== Mexico ===
Mexico's 60-man provisional list was announced by CONCACAF on 19 May 2025. The final squad was announced on 5 June 2025.

Head coach: Javier Aguirre

No.	Pos.	Player	Date of birth (age)	Caps	Goals	Club
1	GK	Luis Malagón	2 March 1997 (aged 28)	10	0	(Mexican Football Federation) América
2	DF	Jorge Sánchez	10 December 1997 (aged 27)	48	2	(Mexican Football Federation) Cruz Azul
3	DF	César Montes	24 February 1997 (aged 28)	54	1	(Russian Football Union) Lokomotiv Moscow
4	MF	Edson Álvarez (captain)	24 October 1997 (aged 27)	86	5	(The Football Association) West Ham United
5	DF	Johan Vásquez	22 October 1998 (aged 26)	31	1	(Italian Football Federation) Genoa
6	MF	Érik Lira	8 May 2000 (aged 25)	8	0	(Mexican Football Federation) Cruz Azul
7	MF	Gilberto Mora	14 October 2008 (aged 16)	0	0	(Mexican Football Federation) Tijuana
8	MF	Carlos Rodríguez	3 January 1997 (aged 28)	57	0	(Mexican Football Federation) Cruz Azul
9	FW	Raúl Jiménez	5 May 1991 (aged 34)	111	39	(The Football Association) Fulham
10	FW	Alexis Vega	25 November 1997 (aged 27)	38	6	(Mexican Football Federation) Toluca
11	FW	Santiago Giménez	18 April 2001 (aged 24)	36	5	(Italian Football Federation) Milan
12	GK	Raúl Rangel	25 February 2000 (aged 25)	3	0	(Mexican Football Federation) Guadalajara
13	GK	Guillermo Ochoa	13 July 1985 (aged 39)	151	0	(Portuguese Football Federation) AVS
14	MF	Marcel Ruiz	26 October 2000 (aged 24)	3	0	(Mexican Football Federation) Toluca
15	DF	Israel Reyes	23 May 2000 (aged 25)	21	2	(Mexican Football Federation) América
16	FW	Julián Quiñones	24 March 1997 (aged 28)	12	2	(Saudi Arabian Football Federation) Al-Qadsiah
17	MF	Orbelín Pineda	24 March 1996 (aged 29)	81	12	(Hellenic Football Federation) AEK Athens
18	FW	Ángel Sepúlveda	15 February 1991 (aged 34)	11	3	(Mexican Football Federation) Cruz Azul
19	DF	Jesús Orozco	19 February 2002 (aged 23)	5	0	(Mexican Football Federation) Cruz Azul
20	MF	Efraín Álvarez	19 June 2002 (aged 22)	6	1	(Mexican Football Federation) Guadalajara
21	FW	César Huerta	3 December 2000 (aged 24)	19	3	(Royal Belgian Football Association) Anderlecht
22	DF	Julián Araujo	13 August 2001 (aged 23)	14	0	(The Football Association) Bournemouth
23	DF	Jesús Gallardo	15 August 1994 (aged 30)	103	2	(Mexican Football Federation) Toluca
24	MF	Luis Chávez	15 January 1996 (aged 29)	40	4	(Russian Football Union) Dynamo Moscow
25	MF	Roberto Alvarado	7 September 1998 (aged 26)	52	5	(Mexican Football Federation) Guadalajara
26	DF	Mateo Chávez	11 May 2004 (aged 21)	1	0	(Royal Dutch Football Association) AZ

=== Dominican Republic ===
Dominican Republic's 60-man provisional list was announced by CONCACAF on 19 May 2025. The final squad was announced on 5 June 2025.

Head coach: (Argentina) Marcelo Neveleff

No.	Pos.	Player	Date of birth (age)	Caps	Goals	Club
1	GK	Miguel Lloyd	23 October 1982 (aged 42)	53	0	(Dominican Football Federation) Cibao
2	DF	Joao Urbáez	24 July 2002 (aged 22)	9	0	(Royal Spanish Football Federation) Leganés
3	DF	Junior Firpo	22 August 1996 (aged 28)	11	4	(The Football Association) Leeds United
4	DF	Edgar Pujol	7 August 2004 (aged 20)	1	0	(Royal Spanish Football Federation) Real Madrid Castilla
5	DF	Noah Dollenmayer	26 October 1999 (aged 25)	3	1	(United States Soccer Federation) El Paso Locomotive
6	MF	Pablo Rosario	7 January 1997 (aged 28)	1	0	(French Football Federation) Nice
7	FW	Rafael Núñez	25 January 2002 (aged 23)	12	3	(Royal Spanish Football Federation) Cartagena
8	MF	Heinz Mörschel	24 August 1997 (aged 27)	16	8	(Portuguese Football Federation) Vizela
9	FW	Mariano Díaz	1 August 1993 (aged 31)	2	2	Unattached
10	MF	Ronaldo Vásquez	30 June 1999 (aged 25)	44	7	(Association of Football Federations of Azerbaijan) Sumgayit
11	FW	Edarlyn Reyes	30 September 1997 (aged 27)	35	4	(Russian Football Union) Arsenal Tula
12	GK	Xavier Valdez	23 November 2003 (aged 21)	13	0	(United States Soccer Federation) Nashville SC
13	MF	Edison Azcona	21 November 2003 (aged 21)	13	0	(United States Soccer Federation) Las Vegas Lights FC
14	MF	Jean Carlos López	9 November 1993 (aged 31)	64	7	(Dominican Football Federation) Cibao
15	DF	Miguel Ángel Beltré	12 July 2003 (aged 21)	4	0	(Royal Spanish Football Federation) Azuqueca
16	MF	Juanca Pineda	12 January 2000 (aged 25)	12	0	(Bulgarian Football Union) Beroe Stara Zagora
17	FW	Dorny Romero	24 January 1998 (aged 27)	39	25	(Bolivian Football Federation) Bolívar
18	DF	Jimmy Kaparos	25 December 2001 (aged 23)	0	0	(German Football Association) Rot-Weiss Essen
19	FW	Peter González	25 July 2002 (aged 22)	3	0	(Royal Spanish Football Federation) Getafe
20	MF	Lucas Bretón	20 November 2006 (aged 18)	8	0	(Royal Spanish Football Federation) Atlético Malagueño
21	DF	Juan Castillo	13 January 2000 (aged 25)	3	0	(Royal Dutch Football Association) RKC Waalwijk
22	GK	Wilkins Geraldo	27 May 2008 (aged 17)	0	0	(Royal Spanish Football Federation) Rayo Majadahonda
23	DF	Luiyi de Lucas	31 August 1994 (aged 30)	24	1	(Cyprus Football Association) Nea Salamis Famagusta
24	DF	Michael Sambataro	4 December 2002 (aged 22)	14	1	Unattached
25	FW	Erick Japa	6 April 1999 (aged 26)	16	2	(Panamanian Football Federation) Umecit
26	MF	Ángel Montes de Oca	18 February 2003 (aged 22)	5	0	(Dominican Football Federation) Cibao

=== Costa Rica ===
Costa Rica's 60-man provisional list was announced by CONCACAF on 19 May 2025. The final squad was announced on 5 June 2025.

Head coach: (Mexico) Miguel Herrera

No.	Pos.	Player	Date of birth (age)	Caps	Goals	Club
1	GK	Keylor Navas (captain)	15 December 1986 (aged 38)	115	0	(Argentine Football Association) Newell's Old Boys
2	DF	Santiago van der Putten	25 June 2004 (aged 20)	2	0	(Costa Rican Football Federation) Alajuelense
3	DF	Jeyland Mitchell	29 September 2004 (aged 20)	16	1	(Royal Dutch Football Association) Feyenoord
4	DF	Juan Pablo Vargas	6 June 1995 (aged 30)	30	3	(Colombian Football Federation) Millonarios
5	DF	Fernán Faerrón	22 August 2000 (aged 24)	6	0	(Costa Rican Football Federation) Herediano
6	DF	Alexis Gamboa	20 March 1999 (aged 26)	7	0	(Costa Rican Football Federation) Alajuelense
7	FW	Andy Rojas	5 December 2005 (aged 19)	7	1	(United States Soccer Federation) New York Red Bulls II
8	DF	Joseph Mora	15 January 1993 (aged 32)	15	0	(Costa Rican Football Federation) Saprissa
9	FW	Manfred Ugalde	25 May 2002 (aged 23)	20	6	(Russian Football Union) Spartak Moscow
10	MF	Brandon Aguilera	28 June 2003 (aged 21)	25	0	(Portuguese Football Federation) Rio Ave
11	DF	Ariel Lassiter	27 September 1994 (aged 30)	29	2	(United States Soccer Federation) Portland Timbers
12	FW	Alonso Martínez	15 October 1998 (aged 26)	21	2	(United States Soccer Federation) New York City FC
13	MF	Jefferson Brenes	13 April 1997 (aged 28)	21	1	(Costa Rican Football Federation) Saprissa
14	MF	Orlando Galo	11 August 2000 (aged 24)	20	3	(Latvian Football Federation) Riga
15	DF	Francisco Calvo	8 July 1992 (aged 32)	105	14	(Turkish Football Federation) Hatayspor
16	MF	Alejandro Bran	5 March 2001 (aged 24)	16	3	(Costa Rican Football Federation) Alajuelense
17	FW	Warren Madrigal	24 July 2004 (aged 20)	22	3	(Royal Spanish Football Federation) Valencia Mestalla
18	GK	Alexandre Lezcano	26 August 2001 (aged 23)	0	0	(Costa Rican Football Federation) San Carlos
19	FW	Kenneth Vargas	17 April 2002 (aged 23)	12	2	(Scottish Football Association) Heart of Midlothian
20	FW	Josimar Alcócer	7 July 2004 (aged 20)	20	4	(Royal Belgian Football Association) K.V.C. Westerlo
21	FW	Álvaro Zamora	9 March 2002 (aged 23)	19	4	(Hellenic Football Federation) Aris Thessaloniki
22	FW	Carlos Mora	18 March 2001 (aged 24)	11	0	(Romanian Football Federation) Universitatea Craiova
23	GK	Patrick Sequeira	1 March 1999 (aged 26)	17	0	(Portuguese Football Federation) Casa Pia
24	DF	Guillermo Villalobos	7 June 2001 (aged 24)	0	0	(Costa Rican Football Federation) Alajuelense
25	MF	Cristopher Núñez	8 December 1997 (aged 27)	12	0	(Costa Rican Football Federation) Cartaginés
26	DF	Kenay Myrie	6 September 2006 (aged 18)	0	0	(Costa Rican Football Federation) Saprissa

=== Suriname ===
Suriname's 60-man provisional list was announced by CONCACAF on 19 May 2025. The final squad was announced on 5 June 2025.

Head coach: (Netherlands) Stanley Menzo

No.	Pos.	Player	Date of birth (age)	Caps	Goals	Club
1	GK	Warner Hahn	15 June 1992 (aged 32)	24	0	(Swedish Football Association) Hammarby IF
2	DF	Anfernee Dijksteel	27 October 1996 (aged 28)	9	0	(The Football Association) Middlesbrough
3	DF	Liam van Gelderen	23 March 2001 (aged 24)	7	0	(Royal Dutch Football Association) RKC Waalwijk
4	DF	Dion Malone	13 February 1989 (aged 36)	23	0	(Cyprus Football Association) Karmiotissa Polemidion
5	DF	Ridgeciano Haps	12 June 1993 (aged 32)	21	2	(Italian Football Federation) Venezia
6	MF	Immanuel Pherai	25 April 2001 (aged 24)	9	1	(German Football Association) Hamburger SV
7	FW	Gyrano Kerk	2 December 1995 (aged 29)	7	1	(Royal Belgian Football Association) Antwerp
8	MF	Justin Lonwijk	21 December 1999 (aged 25)	7	2	(Danish Football Association) Viborg
9	FW	Richonell Margaret	7 July 2000 (aged 24)	2	0	(Royal Dutch Football Association) RKC Waalwijk
10	MF	Denzel Jubitana	6 May 1999 (aged 26)	6	1	(Hellenic Football Federation) Atromitos
11	FW	Shaquille Stein	7 July 2000 (aged 24)	0	0	(Jamaica Football Federation) Cavalier
12	DF	Myenty Abena	12 December 1994 (aged 30)	22	1	(Russian Football Union) Spartak Moscow
13	GK	Jonathan Fonkel	15 April 2005 (aged 20)	0	0	(Surinamese Football Association) Robinhood
14	MF	Jean-Paul Boëtius	22 March 1994 (aged 31)	0	0	(German Football Association) Darmstadt 98
15	DF	Yannick Leliendal	23 April 2002 (aged 23)	0	0	(Royal Dutch Football Association) Volendam
16	MF	Renske Adipi	1 August 1999 (aged 25)	6	0	(Surinamese Football Association) Robinhood
17	DF	Djevencio van der Kust	30 April 2001 (aged 24)	12	2	(Royal Belgian Football Association) Beerschot
18	MF	Jayden Turfkruier	25 September 2002 (aged 22)	2	0	(Royal Dutch Football Association) Telstar
19	DF	Shaquille Pinas	19 March 1998 (aged 27)	24	3	(Swedish Football Association) Hammarby IF
20	FW	Gleofilo Vlijter	17 September 1999 (aged 25)	28	15	(Football Association of Serbia) OFK Beograd
21	FW	Jaden Montnor	9 August 2002 (aged 22)	8	2	(Cyprus Football Association) Aris Limassol
22	MF	Kenneth Paal	24 June 1997 (aged 27)	13	0	(The Football Association) Queens Park Rangers
23	GK	Etienne Vaessen	26 July 1995 (aged 29)	6	0	(Royal Dutch Football Association) Groningen
24	MF	Dhoraso Klas	30 January 2001 (aged 24)	6	0	(Georgian Football Federation) Iberia 1999
25	FW	Jamilhio Rigters	11 November 1999 (aged 25)	15	3	(Jamaica Football Federation) Cavalier
26	GK	Ishan Kort	1 June 2000 (aged 25)	1	0	(Bulgarian Football Union) Hebar Pazardzhik

== Group B ==
=== Canada ===
Canada's 60-man provisional list was announced by CONCACAF on 19 May 2025. The final squad was announced on 5 June 2025. Zorhan Bassong replaced Sam Adekugbe, who was forced to withdraw from the Gold Cup squad due to injury.

Head coach: (United States) Jesse Marsch

No.	Pos.	Player	Date of birth (age)	Caps	Goals	Club
1	GK	Dayne St. Clair	9 May 1997 (aged 28)	12	0	(United States Soccer Federation) Minnesota United FC
2	DF	Alistair Johnston	8 October 1998 (aged 26)	53	1	(Scottish Football Association) Celtic
3	DF	Zorhan Bassong	7 May 1999 (aged 26)	3	0	(United States Soccer Federation) Sporting Kansas City
4	DF	Kamal Miller	16 May 1997 (aged 28)	47	0	(United States Soccer Federation) Portland Timbers
5	DF	Joel Waterman	24 January 1996 (aged 29)	7	0	(Canadian Soccer Association) CF Montréal
6	MF	Mathieu Choinière	7 February 1999 (aged 26)	13	0	(Swiss Football Association) Grasshopper
7	MF	Stephen Eustáquio (captain)	21 December 1996 (aged 28)	50	4	(Portuguese Football Federation) Porto
8	MF	Ismaël Koné	16 June 2002 (aged 22)	29	3	(French Football Federation) Rennes
9	FW	Cyle Larin	17 April 1995 (aged 30)	82	30	(Royal Spanish Football Federation) Mallorca
10	FW	Jonathan David	14 January 2000 (aged 25)	63	34	(French Football Federation) Lille
11	FW	Daniel Jebbison	11 July 2003 (aged 21)	3	0	(The Football Association) Bournemouth
12	FW	Tani Oluwaseyi	15 May 2000 (aged 25)	12	1	(United States Soccer Federation) Minnesota United FC
13	DF	Derek Cornelius	25 November 1997 (aged 27)	33	0	(French Football Federation) Marseille
14	MF	Jacob Shaffelburg	26 November 1999 (aged 25)	23	6	(United States Soccer Federation) Nashville SC
15	DF	Luc de Fougerolles	12 October 2005 (aged 19)	4	0	(The Football Association) Fulham
16	GK	Maxime Crépeau	11 April 1994 (aged 31)	25	0	(United States Soccer Federation) Portland Timbers
17	MF	Tajon Buchanan	8 February 1999 (aged 26)	47	5	(Royal Spanish Football Federation) Villarreal
18	GK	Tom McGill	25 March 2000 (aged 25)	0	0	(The Football Association) Brighton & Hove Albion
19	MF	Nathan Saliba	7 February 2004 (aged 21)	3	0	(Canadian Soccer Association) CF Montréal
20	MF	Ali Ahmed	10 October 2000 (aged 24)	15	0	(Canadian Soccer Association) Vancouver Whitecaps FC
21	MF	Jonathan Osorio	12 June 1992 (aged 33)	85	9	(Canadian Soccer Association) Toronto FC
22	DF	Richie Laryea	7 January 1995 (aged 30)	62	1	(Canadian Soccer Association) Toronto FC
23	MF	Niko Sigur	9 September 2003 (aged 21)	5	0	(Croatian Football Federation) Hajduk Split
24	FW	Promise David	3 July 2001 (aged 23)	1	1	(Royal Belgian Football Association) Union Saint-Gilloise
25	FW	Jayden Nelson	26 September 2002 (aged 22)	7	2	(Canadian Soccer Association) Vancouver Whitecaps FC
26	DF	Jamie Knight-Lebel	24 December 2004 (aged 20)	2	0	(The Football Association) Crewe Alexandra

=== Honduras ===
Honduras's 60-man provisional list was announced by CONCACAF on 19 May 2025. The final squad was announced on 5 June 2025.

Head coach: (Colombia) Reinaldo Rueda

No.	Pos.	Player	Date of birth (age)	Caps	Goals	Club
1	GK	Edrick Menjívar	1 March 1993 (aged 32)	26	0	(National Autonomous Federation of Football of Honduras) Olimpia
2	DF	Denil Maldonado	26 May 1998 (aged 27)	37	1	(Romanian Football Federation) Universitatea Craiova
3	DF	Julián Martínez	1 December 2003 (aged 21)	4	1	(National Autonomous Federation of Football of Honduras) Olimpia
4	DF	Luis Vega	28 February 2001 (aged 24)	22	1	(National Autonomous Federation of Football of Honduras) Motagua
5	MF	Kervin Arriaga	5 January 1998 (aged 27)	32	4	(Royal Spanish Football Federation) Zaragoza
6	DF	Cristopher Meléndez	25 November 1997 (aged 27)	4	0	(National Autonomous Federation of Football of Honduras) Motagua
7	FW	José Pinto	27 September 1997 (aged 27)	17	3	(National Autonomous Federation of Football of Honduras) Olimpia
8	DF	Joseph Rosales	6 November 2000 (aged 24)	21	0	(United States Soccer Federation) Minnesota United FC
9	FW	Anthony Lozano (captain)	25 April 1993 (aged 32)	55	14	(Mexican Football Federation) Santos Laguna
10	MF	Alexander López	5 June 1992 (aged 33)	66	7	(National Autonomous Federation of Football of Honduras) Olancho
11	FW	Jorge Benguché	21 May 1996 (aged 29)	20	5	(National Autonomous Federation of Football of Honduras) Olimpia
12	FW	Romell Quioto	9 August 1991 (aged 33)	69	16	(Saudi Arabian Football Federation) Al-Arabi
13	MF	Carlos Mejía	19 February 2000 (aged 25)	5	0	(National Autonomous Federation of Football of Honduras) Motagua
14	FW	Alexy Vega	16 September 1996 (aged 28)	4	0	(National Autonomous Federation of Football of Honduras) Marathón
15	DF	Getsel Montes	23 June 1996 (aged 28)	0	0	(Costa Rican Football Federation) Herediano
16	MF	Edwin Rodríguez	25 September 1999 (aged 25)	38	6	(National Autonomous Federation of Football of Honduras) Olimpia
17	FW	Luis Palma	17 January 2000 (aged 25)	20	5	(Hellenic Football Federation) Olympiacos
18	FW	Dixon Ramírez	15 April 2001 (aged 24)	0	0	(National Autonomous Federation of Football of Honduras) Real España
19	MF	Carlos Pineda	23 September 1997 (aged 27)	17	0	(National Autonomous Federation of Football of Honduras) Olimpia
20	MF	Deiby Flores	16 June 1996 (aged 28)	46	1	(Canadian Soccer Association) Toronto FC
21	FW	Yustin Arboleda	18 September 1991 (aged 33)	5	0	(National Autonomous Federation of Football of Honduras) Olimpia
22	GK	Luis López	13 September 1993 (aged 31)	57	0	(National Autonomous Federation of Football of Honduras) Real España
23	MF	Jorge Álvarez	29 January 1998 (aged 27)	30	1	(National Autonomous Federation of Football of Honduras) Olimpia
24	DF	Raul García	13 March 2004 (aged 21)	3	0	(National Autonomous Federation of Football of Honduras) UPNFM
25	GK	Marlon Licona	9 February 1991 (aged 34)	2	0	(National Autonomous Federation of Football of Honduras) Motagua
26	DF	Luís Crisanto	1 March 2000 (aged 25)	1	0	(National Autonomous Federation of Football of Honduras) Juticalpa

=== El Salvador ===
El Salvador's 60-man provisional list was announced by CONCACAF on 19 May 2025. The final squad was announced on 5 June 2025.

Head coach: (Colombia) Hernán Darío Gómez

No.	Pos.	Player	Date of birth (age)	Caps	Goals	Club
1	GK	Mario González	20 May 1997 (aged 28)	41	0	(Salvadoran Football Federation) Alianza
2	DF	Julio Sibrián (captain)	17 July 1996 (aged 28)	13	0	(Salvadoran Football Federation) Águila
3	DF	Roberto Domínguez	9 May 1997 (aged 28)	64	1	(Salvadoran Football Federation) Isidro Metapán
4	DF	Jorge Cruz	24 January 2000 (aged 25)	14	0	(Salvadoran Football Federation) FAS
5	DF	Diego Flores	1 July 2001 (aged 23)	7	1	(Salvadoran Football Federation) Luis Ángel Firpo
6	FW	Steven Guerra	12 March 2005 (aged 20)	3	0	(Salvadoran Football Federation) Isidro Metapán
7	MF	Darwin Cerén	31 December 1989 (aged 35)	100	5	(Salvadoran Football Federation) Águila
8	MF	Bryan Landaverde	27 May 1995 (aged 30)	26	1	(Salvadoran Football Federation) Luis Ángel Firpo
9	FW	Brayan Gil	28 June 2001 (aged 23)	11	3	(Russian Football Union) Baltika Kaliningrad
10	MF	Enrico Dueñas	23 February 2001 (aged 24)	17	1	(Royal Dutch Football Association) TOP Oss
11	MF	Josué Rivera	9 March 1999 (aged 26)	0	0	(Salvadoran Football Federation) Isidro Metapán
12	FW	Santos Ortíz	22 January 1990 (aged 35)	16	1	(Salvadoran Football Federation) Águila
13	DF	Alexander Larín	27 June 1992 (aged 32)	84	7	(Salvadoran Football Federation) Águila
14	FW	Rafael Tejada	12 March 2003 (aged 22)	7	2	(Salvadoran Football Federation) FAS
15	MF	Jefferson Valladares	8 December 2002 (aged 22)	4	0	(Salvadoran Football Federation) Municipal Limeño
16	DF	Henry Romero	17 October 1991 (aged 33)	25	1	(Salvadoran Football Federation) Alianza
17	MF	Jairo Henríquez	31 August 1993 (aged 31)	51	5	(Salvadoran Football Federation) Águila
18	GK	Kevin Carabantes	6 February 1993 (aged 32)	5	0	(Salvadoran Football Federation) FAS
19	FW	Emerson Mauricio	27 August 2002 (aged 22)	6	2	(Salvadoran Football Federation) Alianza
20	MF	Harold Osorio	20 August 2003 (aged 21)	3	0	(United States Soccer Federation) Chicago Fire FC
21	DF	Bryan Tamacas	21 February 1995 (aged 30)	79	3	(Salvadoran Football Federation) FAS
22	GK	Benji Villalobos	18 July 1988 (aged 36)	18	0	(Salvadoran Football Federation) Águila
23	MF	Melvin Cartagena	30 July 1999 (aged 25)	19	0	(Salvadoran Football Federation) Isidro Metapán
24	FW	Brandon Ramírez	5 September 2008 (aged 16)	1	1	(Salvadoran Football Federation) Turín FESA
25	MF	Elvin Alvarado	23 August 1998 (aged 26)	2	0	(Salvadoran Football Federation) Isidro Metapán
26	DF	Mauricio Cerritos	17 October 2003 (aged 21)	0	0	(Salvadoran Football Federation) Luis Ángel Firpo

=== Curaçao ===
Curaçao's 60-man provisional list was announced by CONCACAF on 19 May 2025. The final squad was announced on 5 June 2025.

Head coach: (Netherlands) Dick Advocaat

No.	Pos.	Player	Date of birth (age)	Caps	Goals	Club
1	GK	Eloy Room (captain)	6 February 1989 (aged 36)	58	0	(Royal Belgian Football Association) Cercle Brugge
2	DF	Cuco Martina	25 September 1989 (aged 35)	66	1	Unattached
3	DF	Juriën Gaari	23 December 1993 (aged 31)	47	1	(Saudi Arabian Football Federation) Al-Hazem
4	DF	Roshon van Eijma	9 June 1998 (aged 27)	16	0	(Royal Dutch Football Association) RKC Waalwijk
5	DF	Sherel Floranus	23 August 1998 (aged 26)	15	0	(Royal Dutch Football Association) PEC Zwolle
6	MF	Godfried Roemeratoe	19 August 1999 (aged 25)	16	1	(Royal Dutch Football Association) RKC Waalwijk
7	MF	Juninho Bacuna	7 August 1997 (aged 27)	37	12	(Saudi Arabian Football Federation) Al-Wehda
8	MF	Livano Comenencia	3 February 2004 (aged 21)	6	0	(Italian Football Federation) Juventus
9	FW	Jürgen Locadia	7 November 1993 (aged 31)	3	1	(Royal Spanish Football Federation) Intercity
10	MF	Leandro Bacuna	21 August 1991 (aged 33)	59	15	(Royal Dutch Football Association) Groningen
11	FW	Jeremy Antonisse	29 March 2002 (aged 23)	14	1	(Portuguese Football Federation) Moreirense
12	MF	Rayvien Rosario	11 April 2004 (aged 21)	2	0	(Royal Dutch Football Association) Excelsior
13	FW	Joshua Zimmerman	23 May 2001 (aged 24)	10	1	(Royal Dutch Football Association) Top Oss
14	FW	Kenji Gorré	29 September 1994 (aged 30)	28	3	(Qatar Football Association) Umm Salal
15	DF	Ar'jany Martha	4 September 2003 (aged 21)	5	0	(Royal Belgian Football Association) Beerschot
16	FW	Jearl Margaritha	10 April 2000 (aged 25)	11	4	(United States Soccer Federation) Phoenix Rising
17	FW	Brandley Kuwas	19 September 1992 (aged 32)	29	2	(Royal Dutch Football Association) Volendam
18	FW	Rangelo Janga	16 April 1992 (aged 33)	42	21	(Royal Dutch Football Association) FC Eindhoven
19	FW	Gervane Kastaneer	9 June 1996 (aged 29)	18	8	(Football Association of Indonesia) Persib Bandung
20	DF	Joshua Brenet	20 March 1994 (aged 31)	10	1	(Qatar Football Association) Al Rayyan
21	MF	Kevin Felida	11 November 1999 (aged 25)	16	0	(Royal Dutch Football Association) RKC Waalwijk
22	GK	Tyrick Bodak	15 May 2002 (aged 23)	4	0	(Royal Dutch Football Association) Telstar
23	GK	Trevor Doornbusch	6 July 1999 (aged 25)	6	0	(Royal Dutch Football Association) VVV Venlo
24	DF	Tyrique Mercera	19 December 2003 (aged 21)	1	0	(Royal Dutch Football Association) SC Cambuur

== Group C ==
=== Panama ===
Panama's 60-man provisional list was announced by CONCACAF on 19 May 2025. The final squad was announced on 5 June 2025. On June 10 2025, José Fajardo and Cecilio Waterman withdrew due to injury.

Head coach: (Spain) Thomas Christiansen

No.	Pos.	Player	Date of birth (age)	Caps	Goals	Club
1	GK	Luis Mejía	16 March 1991 (aged 34)	54	0	(Uruguayan Football Association) Nacional
2	DF	César Blackman	2 April 1998 (aged 27)	31	2	(Slovak Football Association) Slovan Bratislava
3	DF	José Córdoba	3 June 2001 (aged 24)	24	0	(The Football Association) Norwich City
4	DF	Fidel Escobar	9 January 1995 (aged 30)	85	4	(Costa Rican Football Federation) Saprissa
5	DF	Edgardo Fariña	21 September 2001 (aged 23)	12	0	(Russian Football Union) Khimki
6	MF	Cristian Martínez	6 February 1997 (aged 28)	52	1	(Israel Football Association) Ironi Kiryat
7	MF	José Luis Rodríguez	19 June 1998 (aged 26)	56	7	(Mexican Football Federation) Juárez
8	MF	Víctor Griffith	12 December 2000 (aged 24)	10	0	(Scottish Football Association) St. Johnstone
9	FW	Eduardo Guerrero	21 February 2000 (aged 25)	18	2	(Ukrainian Association of Football) Dynamo Kyiv
10	FW	Ismael Díaz	12 May 1997 (aged 28)	44	9	(Ecuadorian Football Federation) Universidad Católica
11	FW	Azarias Londoño	21 June 2001 (aged 23)	5	0	(Ecuadorian Football Federation) Universidad Católica
12	GK	John Gunn	24 January 2000 (aged 25)	0	0	(United States Soccer Federation) New England Revolution II
13	MF	Janpol Morales	22 June 1998 (aged 26)	4	0	(Ecuadorian Football Federation) Macará
14	DF	Carlos Harvey	3 February 2000 (aged 25)	14	1	(United States Soccer Federation) Minnesota United FC
15	DF	Eric Davis	31 March 1991 (aged 34)	94	7	(Brazilian Football Confederation) Vila Nova
16	DF	Andrés Andrade	16 October 1998 (aged 26)	36	1	(Austrian Football Association) LASK
17	MF	Kahiser Lenis	23 July 2001 (aged 23)	10	2	(Colombian Football Federation) Jaguares de Cordoba
18	FW	Gustavo Herrera	19 November 2005 (aged 19)	1	0	(Mexican Football Federation) Club Puebla
19	DF	Iván Anderson	24 November 1997 (aged 27)	13	1	(National Autonomous Federation of Football of Honduras) Marathón
20	MF	Aníbal Godoy (captain)	10 February 1990 (aged 35)	148	4	(United States Soccer Federation) San Diego FC
21	MF	César Yanis	28 January 1996 (aged 29)	50	4	(Football Federation of Chile) Cobresal
22	GK	Orlando Mosquera	25 December 1994 (aged 30)	34	0	(Saudi Arabian Football Federation) Al-Fayha
23	DF	Michael Amir Murillo	11 February 1996 (aged 29)	82	9	(French Football Federation) Marseille
24	FW	Tomás Rodríguez	9 March 1999 (aged 26)	5	0	(Venezuelan Football Federation) Monagas
25	MF	Edward Cedeño	5 July 2003 (aged 21)	1	0	(Royal Spanish Football Federation) Tarazona
26	DF	Jorge Gutiérrez	1 September 1998 (aged 26)	6	0	(Venezuelan Football Federation) Deportivo La Guaira

=== Jamaica ===
Jamaica's 60-man provisional list was announced by CONCACAF on 19 May 2025. The final squad was announced on 5 June 2025. Karoy Anderson and Sue-Lae McCalla replaced Mason Holgate and Isaac Hayden in the squad due to injuries on 17 June.

Head coach: (England) Steve McClaren

No.	Pos.	Player	Date of birth (age)	Caps	Goals	Club
1	GK	Andre Blake (captain)	21 November 1990 (aged 34)	85	0	(United States Soccer Federation) Philadelphia Union
2	DF	Dexter Lembikisa	4 November 2003 (aged 21)	27	1	(The Football Association) Barnsley
3	DF	Amari'i Bell	5 May 1994 (aged 31)	25	1	(The Football Association) Luton Town
4	DF	Karoy Anderson	1 October 2004 (aged 20)	12	0	(The Football Association) Charlton Athletic
5	DF	Ethan Pinnock	29 May 1993 (aged 32)	19	0	(The Football Association) Brentford
6	DF	Richard King	27 November 2001 (aged 23)	29	1	(Jamaica Football Federation) Cavalier
7	FW	Leon Bailey	9 August 1997 (aged 27)	36	6	(The Football Association) Aston Villa
8	MF	Kasey Palmer	9 November 1996 (aged 28)	17	1	(The Football Association) Hull City
9	FW	Kaheim Dixon	4 October 2004 (aged 20)	16	3	(The Football Association) Charlton Athletic
10	FW	Rumarn Burrell	16 December 2000 (aged 24)	3	1	(The Football Association) Burton Albion
11	FW	Demarai Gray	28 June 1996 (aged 28)	24	7	(Saudi Arabian Football Federation) Al-Ettifaq
12	MF	Dwayne Atkinson	5 May 2002 (aged 23)	5	0	(Jamaica Football Federation) Cavalier
13	GK	Shaquan Davis	11 November 2000 (aged 24)	3	0	(Jamaica Football Federation) Mount Pleasant
14	MF	Sue-Lae McCalla	24 November 1992 (aged 32)	6	1	(Jamaica Football Federation) Mount Pleasant
15	DF	Joel Latibeaudiere	6 January 2000 (aged 25)	26	0	(The Football Association) Coventry City
16	FW	Warner Brown	19 August 2002 (aged 22)	6	4	(Jamaica Football Federation) Arnett Gardens
17	DF	Damion Lowe	5 May 1993 (aged 32)	73	3	(Saudi Arabian Football Federation) Al-Okhdood
18	MF	Jon Russell	9 October 2000 (aged 24)	8	3	(The Football Association) Barnsley
19	DF	Kyle Ming	25 January 1999 (aged 26)	5	0	(Jamaica Football Federation) Mount Pleasant
20	FW	Renaldo Cephas	8 October 1999 (aged 25)	18	1	(Turkish Football Federation) Ankaragücü
21	FW	Romario Williams	15 August 1994 (aged 30)	24	4	(United States Soccer Federation) Indy Eleven
22	DF	Greg Leigh	30 September 1994 (aged 30)	25	1	(The Football Association) Oxford United
23	GK	Jahmali Waite	24 December 1998 (aged 26)	15	0	(United States Soccer Federation) El Paso Locomotive
24	FW	Tyreece Campbell	14 September 2003 (aged 21)	1	0	(The Football Association) Charlton Athletic
25	FW	Bobby De Cordova-Reid	2 February 1993 (aged 32)	38	6	(The Football Association) Leicester City
26	FW	Michail Antonio	28 March 1990 (aged 35)	21	5	(The Football Association) West Ham United

=== Guatemala ===
Guatemala's 60-man provisional list was announced by CONCACAF on 19 May 2025. The final squad was announced on 5 June 2025.

Head coach: (Mexico) Luis Fernando Tena

No.	Pos.	Player	Date of birth (age)	Caps	Goals	Club
1	GK	Nicholas Hagen	2 August 1996 (aged 28)	47	0	(United States Soccer Federation) Columbus Crew
2	DF	José Ardón	20 January 2000 (aged 25)	35	1	(National Football Federation of Guatemala) Antigua
3	DF	Nicolás Samayoa	2 August 1995 (aged 29)	26	1	(Romanian Football Federation) Politehnica Iași
4	DF	José Carlos Pinto	16 June 1993 (aged 31)	66	3	(National Football Federation of Guatemala) Comunicaciones
5	MF	José Rosales	24 June 1993 (aged 31)	10	1	(National Football Federation of Guatemala) Antigua
6	FW	Erick Lemus	5 February 2001 (aged 24)	2	1	(National Football Federation of Guatemala) Comunicaciones
7	DF	Aaron Herrera	6 June 1997 (aged 28)	13	0	(United States Soccer Federation) D.C. United
8	MF	Rodrigo Saravia	22 February 1993 (aged 32)	57	0	(National Football Federation of Guatemala) Municipal
9	FW	Rubio Rubin	1 March 1996 (aged 29)	30	11	(United States Soccer Federation) Charleston Battery
10	MF	Pedro Altán	4 June 1997 (aged 28)	30	3	(National Football Federation of Guatemala) Municipal
11	FW	Rudy Muñoz	6 February 2005 (aged 20)	3	0	(National Football Federation of Guatemala) Municipal
12	GK	Kenderson Navarro	25 February 2002 (aged 23)	2	0	(National Football Federation of Guatemala) Municipal
13	MF	Stheven Robles	10 November 1995 (aged 29)	33	2	(National Football Federation of Guatemala) Comunicaciones
14	FW	Darwin Lom	14 July 1997 (aged 27)	37	12	(National Football Federation of Guatemala) Comunicaciones
15	FW	Damian Rivera	8 December 2002 (aged 22)	0	0	(United States Soccer Federation) Phoenix Rising FC
16	DF	José Morales	3 December 1996 (aged 28)	38	3	(National Football Federation of Guatemala) Municipal
17	MF	Óscar Castellanos	18 January 2000 (aged 25)	49	3	(National Football Federation of Guatemala) Antigua
18	FW	Óscar Santis	25 March 1999 (aged 26)	41	12	(National Football Federation of Guatemala) Antigua
19	FW	Arquímides Ordóñez	5 August 2003 (aged 21)	2	0	(Moldovan Football Federation) Zimbru Chișinău
20	FW	Olger Escobar	11 September 2006 (aged 18)	7	1	(Canadian Soccer Association) CF Montréal
21	GK	Luis Morán	31 May 1996 (aged 29)	0	0	(National Football Federation of Guatemala) Antigua
22	MF	Jonathan Franco	26 July 2003 (aged 21)	14	0	(National Football Federation of Guatemala) Municipal
23	FW	Elmer Cardoza	29 July 2002 (aged 22)	14	0	(National Football Federation of Guatemala) Xelajú
24	DF	Carlos Aguilar	25 October 2006 (aged 18)	2	0	(National Football Federation of Guatemala) Malacateco
25	MF	Kevin Ramírez	1 August 2002 (aged 22)	2	0	(National Football Federation of Guatemala) Malacateco
26	MF	Matt Evans	25 May 2006 (aged 19)	2	0	(United States Soccer Federation) Los Angeles FC

=== Guadeloupe ===
Guadeloupe's 60-man provisional list was announced by CONCACAF on 19 May 2025. The final squad was announced on 5 June 2025.

Head coach: Jocelyn Angloma

No.	Pos.	Player	Date of birth (age)	Caps	Goals	Club
1	GK	Rubens Adélaïde	15 December 1998 (aged 26)	1	0	(French Football Federation) Chambly
2	DF	Zoran Moco	27 June 2003 (aged 21)	5	0	(French Football Federation) Dijon
3	MF	Alexandre Arenate	20 July 1995 (aged 29)	9	0	(Luxembourg Football Federation) Jeunesse Esch
4	DF	Jérôme Roussillon	6 January 1993 (aged 32)	15	2	(German Football Association) Union Berlin
5	DF	Nathanaël Saintini	30 May 2000 (aged 25)	17	0	(French Football Federation) Martigues
6	MF	Anthony Baron	29 December 1992 (aged 32)	34	2	(Swiss Football Association) Servette
7	MF	Noah Cadiou	26 October 1998 (aged 26)	3	0	(French Football Federation) Rodez
8	MF	Ange-Freddy Plumain	2 March 1995 (aged 30)	22	8	(Cyprus Football Association) Nea Salamina
9	FW	Thierry Ambrose	28 March 1997 (aged 28)	17	5	(Royal Belgian Football Association) KV Kortrijk
10	FW	Matthias Phaëton	8 January 2000 (aged 25)	31	11	(Bulgarian Football Union) CSKA Sofia
11	FW	Taïryk Arconte	12 November 2003 (aged 21)	5	3	(French Football Federation) Pau
12	MF	Junior Senneville	31 January 1991 (aged 34)	11	0	(French Football Federation) Dunkerque
13	FW	Florian David	16 November 1992 (aged 32)	10	4	(Luxembourg Football Federation) Swift Hesperange
14	FW	Kilian Bevis	13 February 1998 (aged 27)	11	1	(Football Association of Serbia) Radnički Kragujevac
15	DF	Dimitri Cavaré	5 February 1995 (aged 30)	12	0	(Turkish Football Federation) Ümraniyespor
16	GK	Brice Cognard	26 April 1990 (aged 35)	8	0	(French Football Federation) Châteauroux
17	FW	Kenny Mixtur	9 October 2003 (aged 21)	4	1	(Luxembourg Football Federation) Progrès Niederkorn
18	MF	Jordan Leborgne	29 September 1995 (aged 29)	16	2	(French Football Federation) Quevilly-Rouen
19	DF	Méddy Lina	11 January 1986 (aged 39)	32	0	(Ligue guadeloupéenne de football) Jeunesse Évolution
20	FW	Raphaël Mirval	4 May 1996 (aged 29)	23	11	(Ligue guadeloupéenne de football) Baie-Mahault
21	DF	Keyvan Beaumont	18 July 2005 (aged 19)	3	0	(Ligue guadeloupéenne de football) La Gauloise
22	FW	Vikash Tillé	26 November 1997 (aged 27)	19	3	(Ligue guadeloupéenne de football) CSM
23	GK	Davy Rouyard	17 August 1999 (aged 25)	13	0	(French Football Federation) Bordeaux
24	MF	Johan Angloma	18 October 1993 (aged 31)	3	0	(Ligue guadeloupéenne de football) L'Étoile
25	DF	Christopher Jullien	22 March 1993 (aged 32)	0	0	(French Football Federation) Montpellier
26	DF	Yvann Maçon	1 October 1998 (aged 26)	0	0	(French Football Federation) Saint-Étienne

== Group D ==
=== United States ===
The United States' 60-man provisional list was announced by CONCACAF on 19 May 2025. The final squad was announced on 5 June 2025.

Head coach: (Argentina) Mauricio Pochettino

No.	Pos.	Player	Date of birth (age)	Caps	Goals	Club
1	GK	Matt Turner	24 June 1994 (aged 30)	52	0	(The Football Association) Nottingham Forest
2	DF	John Tolkin	31 July 2002 (aged 22)	5	0	(German Football Association) Holstein Kiel
3	DF	Chris Richards	28 March 2000 (aged 25)	25	1	(The Football Association) Crystal Palace
4	MF	Tyler Adams	14 February 1999 (aged 26)	45	2	(The Football Association) Bournemouth
5	DF	Walker Zimmerman	19 May 1993 (aged 32)	45	3	(United States Soccer Federation) Nashville SC
6	MF	Jack McGlynn	7 July 2003 (aged 21)	5	2	(United States Soccer Federation) Houston Dynamo FC
7	MF	Quinn Sullivan	27 March 2004 (aged 21)	2	0	(United States Soccer Federation) Philadelphia Union
8	MF	Sebastian Berhalter	10 May 2001 (aged 24)	1	0	(Canadian Soccer Association) Vancouver Whitecaps FC
9	FW	Damion Downs	6 July 2004 (aged 20)	1	0	(German Football Association) 1. FC Köln
10	MF	Diego Luna	7 September 2003 (aged 21)	6	0	(United States Soccer Federation) Real Salt Lake
11	MF	Brenden Aaronson	22 October 2000 (aged 24)	48	8	(The Football Association) Leeds United
12	DF	Miles Robinson	14 March 1997 (aged 28)	33	3	(United States Soccer Federation) FC Cincinnati
13	DF	Tim Ream (captain)	5 October 1987 (aged 37)	69	1	(United States Soccer Federation) Charlotte FC
14	MF	Luca de la Torre	23 May 1998 (aged 27)	25	1	(United States Soccer Federation) San Diego FC
15	MF	Johnny Cardoso	20 September 2001 (aged 23)	20	0	(Royal Spanish Football Federation) Real Betis
16	DF	Alex Freeman	9 August 2004 (aged 20)	1	0	(United States Soccer Federation) Orlando City SC
17	MF	Malik Tillman	28 May 2002 (aged 23)	19	0	(Royal Dutch Football Association) PSV Eindhoven
18	DF	Max Arfsten	19 April 2001 (aged 24)	5	0	(United States Soccer Federation) Columbus Crew
19	FW	Haji Wright	27 March 1998 (aged 27)	16	4	(The Football Association) Coventry City
20	DF	Nathan Harriel	23 April 2001 (aged 24)	2	0	(United States Soccer Federation) Philadelphia Union
21	FW	Paxten Aaronson	26 August 2003 (aged 21)	2	0	(Royal Dutch Football Association) Utrecht
22	DF	Mark McKenzie	25 February 1999 (aged 26)	21	0	(French Football Federation) Toulouse
23	FW	Brian White	3 February 1996 (aged 29)	6	1	(Canadian Soccer Association) Vancouver Whitecaps FC
24	FW	Patrick Agyemang	7 November 2000 (aged 24)	6	3	(United States Soccer Federation) Charlotte FC
25	GK	Matt Freese	2 September 1998 (aged 26)	1	0	(United States Soccer Federation) New York City FC
26	GK	Chris Brady	3 March 2004 (aged 21)	0	0	(United States Soccer Federation) Chicago Fire FC

=== Haiti ===
Haiti's 60-man provisional list was announced by CONCACAF on 19 May 2025. The final squad was announced on 5 June 2025.

Head coach: (France) Sébastien Migné

No.	Pos.	Player	Date of birth (age)	Caps	Goals	Club
1	GK	Johny Placide (captain)	29 January 1988 (aged 37)	69	0	(French Football Federation) Bastia
2	DF	Carlens Arcus	28 June 1996 (aged 28)	39	1	(French Football Federation) Angers
3	DF	Francois Dulysse	13 April 1999 (aged 26)	10	0	(Albanian Football Federation) Egnatia
4	DF	Ricardo Adé	21 May 1990 (aged 35)	41	2	(Ecuadorian Football Federation) LDU Quito
5	MF	Daniel Saint-Fleur	13 October 1999 (aged 25)	0	0	(Haitian Football Federation) Real Hope
6	DF	Garven Metusala	31 December 1999 (aged 25)	11	0	(United States Soccer Federation) Colorado Springs Switchbacks
7	MF	Fafà Picault	23 February 1991 (aged 34)	12	1	(United States Soccer Federation) Inter Miami CF
8	DF	Martin Expérience	9 March 1999 (aged 26)	8	0	(French Football Federation) Nancy
9	FW	Duckens Nazon	7 April 1994 (aged 31)	60	37	(Turkish Football Federation) Kayserispor
10	MF	Louicius Deedson	11 February 2001 (aged 24)	14	5	(Danish Football Association) OB
11	MF	Dany Jean	28 November 2002 (aged 22)	9	1	(Portuguese Football Federation) Torreense
12	GK	Alexandre Pierre	25 February 2001 (aged 24)	9	0	(French Football Federation) Sochaux
13	DF	Duke Lacroix	14 October 1993 (aged 31)	5	1	(United States Soccer Federation) Colorado Springs Switchbacks
14	MF	Leverton Pierre	9 March 1998 (aged 27)	20	0	(French Football Federation) Châteauroux
15	FW	Mikaël Cantave	25 October 1996 (aged 28)	17	4	(Canadian Soccer Association) Vancouver FC
16	FW	Mondy Prunier	22 December 1999 (aged 25)	14	7	(Royal Belgian Football Association) Francs Borains
17	MF	Danley Jean Jacques	20 May 2000 (aged 25)	14	3	(United States Soccer Federation) Philadelphia Union
18	FW	Ruben Providence	7 July 2001 (aged 23)	1	0	(Royal Dutch Football Association) Almere City
19	MF	Belmar Joseph	13 October 2005 (aged 19)	3	0	(Swiss Football Association) Sion
20	FW	Frantzdy Pierrot	29 March 1995 (aged 30)	33	24	(Hellenic Football Federation) AEK Athens
21	MF	Christopher Attys	13 March 2001 (aged 24)	6	0	(Italian Football Federation) Triestina
22	DF	Jean-Kévin Duverne	12 July 1997 (aged 27)	5	1	(Royal Belgian Football Association) Kortrijk
23	GK	Garissone Innocent	16 April 2000 (aged 25)	2	0	(Lithuanian Football Federation) Riteriai
24	DF	Wilguens Paugain	24 August 2001 (aged 23)	1	0	(Royal Belgian Football Association) Zulte Waregem
25	FW	Téo James Michel	3 May 2004 (aged 21)	0	0	(French Football Federation) Châteauroux

=== Trinidad and Tobago ===
Trinidad and Tobago's 60-man provisional list was announced by CONCACAF on 19 May 2025. The final squad was announced on 5 June 2025. Josiah Trimmingham was then replaced by Justin Garcia on 12 June.

Head coach: Dwight Yorke

No.	Pos.	Player	Date of birth (age)	Caps	Goals	Club
1	GK	Marvin Phillip	1 August 1984 (aged 40)	92	0	(Trinidad and Tobago Football Association) Port of Spain
2	DF	Darnell Hospedales	13 March 1999 (aged 26)	4	0	(Jamaica Football Federation) Montego Bay United
3	DF	Joevin Jones	3 August 1991 (aged 33)	95	14	(Trinidad and Tobago Football Association) Police FC
4	DF	Sheldon Bateau	29 January 1991 (aged 34)	56	5	(Royal Belgian Football Association) Beveren
5	DF	Justin Garcia	26 October 1995 (aged 29)	30	1	(Trinidad and Tobago Football Association) Defence Force
6	DF	Andre Raymond	9 November 2000 (aged 24)	12	0	(Scottish Football Association) Dunfermline Athletic
7	MF	Steffen Yeates	4 January 2000 (aged 25)	6	1	(Canadian Soccer Association) York United FC
8	MF	Daniel Phillips	18 January 2001 (aged 24)	16	0	(The Football Association) Stevenage
9	MF	Nathaniel James	17 June 2004 (aged 20)	12	4	(United States Soccer Federation) Portland Hearts of Pine
10	MF	Kevin Molino	17 June 1990 (aged 34)	65	25	(Trinidad and Tobago Football Association) Defence Force
11	MF	Levi García	20 November 1997 (aged 27)	43	8	(Russian Football Union) Spartak Moscow
12	FW	Isaiah Leacock	11 November 1999 (aged 25)	1	1	(Trinidad and Tobago Football Association) Defence Force
13	FW	Tyrese Spicer	4 December 2000 (aged 24)	2	0	(Canadian Soccer Association) Toronto FC
14	MF	Wayne Frederick	13 June 2004 (aged 21)	0	0	(United States Soccer Federation) Colorado Rapids
15	FW	Dante Sealy	17 April 2003 (aged 22)	0	0	(Canadian Soccer Association) CF Montréal
16	DF	Alvin Jones	9 July 1994 (aged 30)	58	6	(National Autonomous Federation of Football of Honduras) Real Sociedad
17	FW	Rio Cardines	7 January 2006 (aged 19)	1	0	(The Football Association) Crystal Palace
18	MF	Andre Rampersad	2 February 1995 (aged 30)	20	1	(Canadian Soccer Association) HFX Wanderers FC
19	MF	Ajani Fortune	30 December 2002 (aged 22)	10	1	(United States Soccer Federation) Atlanta United FC
20	MF	Real Gill	23 January 2003 (aged 22)	13	2	(United States Soccer Federation) Huntsville City FC
21	GK	Jabari St. Hillaire	19 November 1999 (aged 25)	2	0	(Trinidad and Tobago Football Association) Defence Force
22	GK	Denzil Smith	12 October 1999 (aged 25)	18	0	(United States Soccer Federation) AV Alta
23	FW	Noah Powder	27 October 1998 (aged 26)	28	2	(United States Soccer Federation) Westchester SC
24	FW	Isaiah Garcia	22 April 1998 (aged 27)	8	0	(Trinidad and Tobago Football Association) Defence Force
25	DF	Kaihim Thomas	8 February 2003 (aged 22)	4	0	(Trinidad and Tobago Football Association) Defence Force
26	DF	Isaiah Lee	21 September 1999 (aged 25)	12	3	(Trinidad and Tobago Football Association) La Horquetta Rangers

=== Saudi Arabia ===
Saudi Arabia's 60-man provisional list was announced by CONCACAF on 19 May 2025. The final squad was announced on 5 June 2025.

Head coach: (France) Hervé Renard

No.	Pos.	Player	Date of birth (age)	Caps	Goals	Club
1	GK	Nawaf Al-Aqidi	10 May 2000 (aged 25)	9	0	(Saudi Arabian Football Federation) Al-Fateh
2	DF	Muhannad Al-Shanqeeti	12 March 1999 (aged 26)	4	0	(Saudi Arabian Football Federation) Al-Ittihad
3	DF	Salem Al-Najdi	27 January 2003 (aged 22)	0	0	(Saudi Arabian Football Federation) Al-Nassr
4	DF	Abdulelah Al-Amri	15 January 1997 (aged 28)	29	1	(Saudi Arabian Football Federation) Al-Ittihad
5	DF	Abdullah Madu	15 July 1993 (aged 31)	16	0	(Saudi Arabian Football Federation) Al-Ettifaq
6	MF	Ali Al-Hassan	4 March 1997 (aged 28)	14	1	(Saudi Arabian Football Federation) Al-Nassr
7	MF	Mukhtar Ali	30 October 1997 (aged 27)	13	0	(Saudi Arabian Football Federation) Al-Ettifaq
8	FW	Marwan Al-Sahafi	17 February 2004 (aged 21)	9	0	(Royal Belgian Football Association) Beerschot
9	FW	Firas Al-Buraikan	14 May 2000 (aged 25)	51	9	(Saudi Arabian Football Federation) Al-Ahli
10	MF	Faisal Al-Ghamdi	13 August 2001 (aged 23)	15	1	(Royal Belgian Football Association) Beerschot
11	FW	Saleh Al-Shehri	1 November 1993 (aged 31)	40	16	(Saudi Arabian Football Federation) Al-Ittihad
12	DF	Saud Abdulhamid	18 July 1999 (aged 25)	44	1	(Italian Football Federation) Roma
13	DF	Nawaf Boushal	16 September 1999 (aged 25)	8	0	(Saudi Arabian Football Federation) Al-Nassr
14	DF	Hassan Kadesh	27 September 1992 (aged 32)	14	2	(Saudi Arabian Football Federation) Al-Ittihad
15	MF	Ayman Yahya	14 May 2001 (aged 24)	15	0	(Saudi Arabian Football Federation) Al-Nassr
16	MF	Ziyad Al-Johani	11 November 2001 (aged 23)	3	0	(Saudi Arabian Football Federation) Al-Ahli
17	MF	Mohammed Bakor	8 April 2004 (aged 21)	0	0	(Saudi Arabian Football Federation) Al-Ahli
18	MF	Muhannad Al-Saad	29 June 2003 (aged 21)	0	0	(French Football Federation) Dunkerque
19	MF	Turki Al-Ammar	23 September 1999 (aged 25)	10	1	(Saudi Arabian Football Federation) Al-Qadsiah
20	FW	Abdullah Al-Salem	19 December 1992 (aged 32)	1	0	(Saudi Arabian Football Federation) Al-Khaleej
21	GK	Abdulrahman Al-Sanbi	3 February 2001 (aged 24)	0	0	(Saudi Arabian Football Federation) Al-Ahli
22	GK	Ahmed Al-Kassar	8 May 1991 (aged 34)	8	0	(Saudi Arabian Football Federation) Al-Qadsiah
23	MF	Ali Al-Asmari	12 January 1997 (aged 28)	5	0	(Saudi Arabian Football Federation) Al-Ahli
24	MF	Abdulrahman Al-Aboud	1 June 1995 (aged 30)	7	2	(Saudi Arabian Football Federation) Al-Ittihad
25	MF	Hammam Al-Hammami	30 January 2004 (aged 21)	0	0	(Saudi Arabian Football Federation) Al-Kholood
26	DF	Ali Majrashi	1 October 1999 (aged 25)	6	0	(Saudi Arabian Football Federation) Al-Ahli
