= Shaquan Davis =

Shaquan Davis may refer to:

- Shaquan Davis (American football) (born 2000), American football player
- Shaquan Davis (footballer) (born 2000), Jamaican footballer
