= 2024 CONCACAF Nations League Finals squads =

The 2024 CONCACAF Nations League Finals was the four-side final tournament of the 2023–24 CONCACAF Nations League held in the United States from 21 to 24 March 2024. The four national teams involved in the tournament were required to register a squad of 23 players, of which three had to be goalkeepers. Only players in these squads were eligible to take part in the tournament.

Each national team had to submit a provisional list of up to 60 players (five of whom had to be goalkeepers) to CONCACAF no later than thirty days prior to the start of the tournament and players could not be added to these lists after the specified deadline. The final list of 23 players per national team had to be submitted to CONCACAF by 11 March 2024, ten days before the opening match of the tournament. All players in the final list had to be chosen from the respective provisional list. In the event that a player on the submitted final list suffered a serious injury or had medical reasons, he could be replaced up to 24 hours before the kick-off of his team's first match of the tournament, provided that it was approved by the CONCACAF Medical Committee. The replacement player had to come from the provisional list and would be assigned the shirt number of the replaced player.

CONCACAF published the provisional rosters on 26 February 2024. The final 23-man rosters were published on 14 March 2024.

The age listed for each player is their age as of 21 March 2024, the first day of the tournament. The numbers of caps and goals listed for each player do not include any matches played after the start of the tournament. The club listed is the club for which the player last played a competitive match prior to the tournament. The nationality for each club reflects the national association (not the league) to which the club is affiliated. A flag is included for coaches who are of a different nationality than their own national team.

== Panama ==
Panama announced their 60-man provisional list on 26 February 2024. The final squad was announced on 14 March 2024.

Head coach: (Spain) Thomas Christiansen

No.	Pos.	Player	Date of birth (age)	Caps	Goals	Club
1	GK	Luis Mejía	16 March 1991 (aged 33)	49	0	(Uruguayan Football Association) Nacional
2	DF	César Blackman	2 April 1998 (aged 25)	17	0	(Slovak Football Association) Slovan Bratislava
3	DF	José Córdoba	3 June 2001 (aged 22)	9	0	(Bulgarian Football Union) Levski Sofia
4	DF	Fidel Escobar	9 January 1995 (aged 29)	73	2	(Costa Rican Football Federation) Saprissa
5	MF	Abdiel Ayarza	12 September 1992 (aged 31)	24	4	(Peruvian Football Federation) Cienciano
6	MF	Cristian Martínez	6 February 1997 (aged 27)	34	0	(Saudi Arabian Football Federation) Al-Jandal
7	MF	José Luis Rodríguez	19 June 1998 (aged 25)	43	4	(Portuguese Football Federation) Famalicão
8	MF	Adalberto Carrasquilla	28 November 1998 (aged 25)	49	2	(United States Soccer Federation) Houston Dynamo FC
9	FW	Alfredo Stephens	25 December 1994 (aged 29)	27	1	(Israel Football Association) Ironi Kiryat Shmona
10	MF	Yoel Bárcenas	23 October 1993 (aged 30)	79	7	(Mexican Football Federation) Mazatlán
11	FW	Ismael Díaz	12 May 1997 (aged 26)	32	9	(Ecuadorian Football Federation) Universidad Católica
12	GK	César Samudio	26 March 1994 (aged 29)	2	0	(National Autonomous Federation of Football of Honduras) Marathón
13	DF	Jiovany Ramos	26 January 1997 (aged 27)	12	0	(Peruvian Football Federation) Alianza Lima
14	DF	Roderick Miller	3 April 1992 (aged 31)	35	2	(Association of Football Federations of Azerbaijan) Turan Tovuz
15	DF	Eric Davis	31 March 1991 (aged 32)	83	7	(Slovak Football Association) Košice
16	DF	Andrés Andrade	16 October 1998 (aged 25)	32	1	(Austrian Football Association) LASK
17	FW	José Fajardo	18 August 1993 (aged 30)	41	8	(Ecuadorian Football Federation) Universidad Católica
18	FW	Cecilio Waterman	13 April 1991 (aged 32)	33	9	(Peruvian Football Federation) Alianza Lima
19	MF	Alberto Quintero	18 December 1987 (aged 36)	133	7	(Panamanian Football Federation) Plaza Amador
20	MF	Aníbal Godoy (captain)	10 February 1990 (aged 34)	130	4	(United States Soccer Federation) Nashville SC
21	MF	Kahiser Lenis	23 July 2000 (aged 23)	1	2	(Colombian Football Federation) Jaguares
22	GK	Orlando Mosquera	25 December 1994 (aged 29)	20	0	(Israel Football Association) Maccabi Tel Aviv
23	DF	Iván Anderson	24 November 1997 (aged 26)	8	1	(Colombian Football Federation) Fortaleza

== United States ==
The United States' 60-man provisional list was announced by CONCACAF on 26 February 2024. The final squad was announced on 13 March 2024. On 17 March 2024, midfielder Luca de la Torre and forward Josh Sargent were replaced by Haji Wright and Brenden Aaronson due to injuries.

Head coach: Gregg Berhalter

No.	Pos.	Player	Date of birth (age)	Caps	Goals	Club
1	GK	Matt Turner	24 June 1994 (aged 29)	37	0	(The Football Association) Nottingham Forest
2	DF	Sergiño Dest	3 November 2000 (aged 23)	32	2	(Royal Dutch Football Association) PSV Eindhoven
3	DF	Chris Richards	28 March 2000 (aged 23)	14	1	(The Football Association) Crystal Palace
4	MF	Tyler Adams	14 February 1999 (aged 25)	36	1	(The Football Association) Bournemouth
5	DF	Antonee Robinson	8 August 1997 (aged 26)	39	4	(The Football Association) Fulham
6	MF	Yunus Musah	29 November 2002 (aged 21)	33	0	(Italian Football Federation) Milan
7	MF	Giovanni Reyna	13 November 2002 (aged 21)	24	7	(The Football Association) Nottingham Forest
8	MF	Weston McKennie	28 August 1998 (aged 25)	49	11	(Italian Football Federation) Juventus
9	FW	Ricardo Pepi	9 January 2003 (aged 21)	22	10	(Royal Dutch Football Association) PSV Eindhoven
10	FW	Christian Pulisic (captain)	18 September 1998 (aged 25)	64	28	(Italian Football Federation) Milan
11	FW	Brenden Aaronson	20 February 2000 (aged 24)	38	8	(German Football Association) Union Berlin
12	DF	Miles Robinson	14 March 1997 (aged 27)	28	3	(United States Soccer Federation) FC Cincinnati
13	DF	Tim Ream	5 October 1987 (aged 36)	55	1	(The Football Association) Fulham
14	FW	Haji Wright	27 March 1998 (aged 25)	7	2	(The Football Association) Coventry City
15	MF	Johnny Cardoso	20 September 2001 (aged 22)	9	0	(Royal Spanish Football Federation) Real Betis
16	DF	Mark McKenzie	25 February 1999 (aged 25)	13	0	(Royal Belgian Football Association) Genk
17	FW	Malik Tillman	28 May 2002 (aged 21)	8	0	(Royal Dutch Football Association) PSV Eindhoven
18	GK	Ethan Horvath	9 June 1995 (aged 28)	9	0	(Football Association of Wales) Cardiff City
19	DF	Joe Scally	31 December 2002 (aged 21)	8	0	(German Football Association) Borussia Mönchengladbach
20	FW	Folarin Balogun	3 July 2001 (aged 22)	8	3	(French Football Federation) Monaco (Note: Monaco is a Monégasque club playing in the French soccer league system.)
21	FW	Timothy Weah	22 February 2000 (aged 24)	35	5	(Italian Football Federation) Juventus
22	GK	Drake Callender	7 October 1997 (aged 26)	0	0	(United States Soccer Federation) Inter Miami CF
23	DF	Kristoffer Lund	14 May 2002 (aged 21)	3	0	(Italian Football Federation) Palermo

== Jamaica ==
Jamaica's 60-man provisional list was announced by CONCACAF on 26 February 2024. The final squad was announced on 14 March 2024.

Head coach: (Iceland) Heimir Hallgrímsson

No.	Pos.	Player	Date of birth (age)	Caps	Goals	Club
1	GK	Andre Blake (captain)	21 November 1990 (aged 33)	73	0	(United States Soccer Federation) Philadelphia Union
2	DF	Dexter Lembikisa	4 November 2003 (aged 20)	14	0	(Scottish Football Association) Heart of Midlothian
3	DF	Michael Hector	19 July 1992 (aged 31)	36	0	(The Football Association) Charlton Athletic
4	DF	Tayvon Gray	19 August 2002 (aged 21)	3	0	(United States Soccer Federation) New York City FC
5	DF	Richard King	27 November 2001 (aged 22)	14	0	(Jamaica Football Federation) Cavalier
6	DF	Di'Shon Bernard	14 October 2000 (aged 23)	11	1	(The Football Association) Sheffield Wednesday
7	FW	Kaheim Dixon	4 October 2004 (aged 19)	0	0	(Jamaica Football Federation) Arnett Gardens
8	MF	Daniel Johnson	8 October 1992 (aged 31)	23	3	(The Football Association) Stoke City
9	FW	Cory Burke	28 December 1991 (aged 32)	31	7	(United States Soccer Federation) New York Red Bulls
10	MF	Bobby De Cordova-Reid	2 February 1993 (aged 31)	27	6	(The Football Association) Fulham
11	FW	Shamar Nicholson	16 February 1997 (aged 27)	44	16	(French Football Federation) Clermont
12	FW	Demarai Gray	28 June 1996 (aged 27)	10	5	(Saudi Arabian Football Federation) Al-Ettifaq
13	GK	Shaquan Davis	11 November 2000 (aged 23)	0	0	(Jamaica Football Federation) Mount Pleasant
14	MF	Kasey Palmer	9 November 1996 (aged 27)	3	0	(The Football Association) Coventry City
15	MF	Joel Latibeaudiere	6 January 2000 (aged 24)	12	0	(The Football Association) Coventry City
16	MF	Karoy Anderson	1 October 2004 (aged 19)	2	0	(The Football Association) Charlton Athletic
17	DF	Damion Lowe	5 May 1993 (aged 30)	58	3	(United States Soccer Federation) Philadelphia Union
18	FW	Romario Williams	15 August 1994 (aged 29)	14	3	(United States Soccer Federation) Hartford Athletic
19	FW	Jamal Lowe	21 July 1994 (aged 29)	6	2	(Football Association of Wales) Swansea City
20	MF	Renaldo Cephas	8 December 1999 (aged 24)	1	0	(Turkish Football Federation) Ankaragücü
22	DF	Greg Leigh	30 September 1994 (aged 29)	12	0	(The Football Association) Oxford United
23	GK	Jahmali Waite	24 December 1998 (aged 25)	8	0	(United States Soccer Federation) El Paso Locomotive FC

== Mexico ==
Mexico's 60-man provisional list was announced by CONCACAF on 26 February 2024. The final squad was announced on 15 March 2024.

Head coach: Jaime Lozano

No.	Pos.	Player	Date of birth (age)	Caps	Goals	Club
1	GK	Luis Malagón	2 March 1997 (aged 27)	4	0	(Mexican Football Federation) América
2	DF	Julián Araujo	13 August 2001 (aged 22)	12	0	(Royal Spanish Football Federation) Las Palmas
3	DF	César Montes	24 February 1997 (aged 27)	42	1	(Royal Spanish Football Federation) Almería
4	MF	Edson Álvarez	24 October 1997 (aged 26)	74	4	(The Football Association) West Ham United
5	DF	Johan Vásquez	22 October 1998 (aged 25)	20	1	(Italian Football Federation) Genoa
6	DF	Gerardo Arteaga	7 September 1998 (aged 25)	21	1	(Mexican Football Federation) Monterrey
7	MF	Luis Romo	5 June 1995 (aged 28)	42	3	(Mexican Football Federation) Monterrey
8	MF	Carlos Rodríguez	3 January 1997 (aged 27)	49	0	(Mexican Football Federation) Cruz Azul
9	FW	Julián Quiñones	24 March 1997 (aged 26)	2	0	(Mexican Football Federation) América
10	FW	Roberto Alvarado	7 September 1998 (aged 25)	43	5	(Mexican Football Federation) Guadalajara
11	FW	Santiago Giménez	18 April 2001 (aged 22)	24	4	(Royal Dutch Football Association) Feyenoord
12	GK	Julio González	23 April 1991 (aged 32)	0	0	(Mexican Football Federation) UNAM
13	GK	Guillermo Ochoa (captain)	13 July 1985 (aged 38)	149	0	(Italian Football Federation) Salernitana
14	MF	Érick Sánchez	27 September 1999 (aged 24)	25	3	(Mexican Football Federation) Pachuca
15	FW	Uriel Antuna	21 August 1997 (aged 26)	58	14	(Mexican Football Federation) Cruz Azul
16	DF	Jesús Orozco	23 May 2000 (aged 23)	1	0	(Mexican Football Federation) Guadalajara
17	MF	Orbelín Pineda	24 March 1996 (aged 27)	66	9	(Hellenic Football Federation) AEK Athens
18	MF	Luis Chávez	15 January 1996 (aged 28)	28	4	(Russian Football Union) Dynamo Moscow
19	DF	Jorge Sánchez	10 December 1997 (aged 26)	40	1	(Portuguese Football Federation) Porto
20	FW	Henry Martín	18 November 1992 (aged 31)	41	9	(Mexican Football Federation) América
21	MF	Érick Aguirre	26 October 2000 (aged 23)	14	0	(Mexican Football Federation) Monterrey
22	FW	Hirving Lozano	30 July 1995 (aged 28)	68	18	(Royal Dutch Football Association) PSV Eindhoven
23	DF	Jesús Gallardo	15 August 1994 (aged 29)	97	2	(Mexican Football Federation) Monterrey
