= Jamaica national football team =

Men's association football team

Jamaica
- Nickname: The Reggae Boyz
- Association: Jamaica Football Federation (JFF)
- Confederation: CONCACAF (North America)
- Sub-confederation: CFU (Caribbean)
- Head coach: Rudolph Speid
- Captain: Andre Blake
- Most caps: Ian Goodison (128)
- Top scorer: Luton Shelton (35)
- Home stadium: Independence Park
- FIFA code: JAM
First colours	Second colours

FIFA ranking
- Current: 67 ▲2 (18 November 2026)
- Highest: 27 (August 1998)
- Lowest: 116 (October 2008)

First international
- Haiti 1–2 Jamaica (Port-au-Prince, Haiti; 22 March 1925)

Biggest win
- Jamaica 12–0 British Virgin Islands (Grand Cayman, Cayman Islands; 4 March 1994); Jamaica 12–0 Saint Martin (Kingston, Jamaica; 24 November 2004)

Biggest defeat
- Costa Rica 9–0 Jamaica (San José, Costa Rica; 24 February 1999)

World Cup
- Appearances: 1 (first in 1998)
- Best result: Group stage (1998)

CONCACAF Championship / Gold Cup
- Appearances: 16 (first in 1963)
- Best result: Runners-up (2015, 2017)

CONCACAF Nations League
- Appearances: 4 (first in 2019–20)
- Best result: 3rd place (2023–24)

Copa América
- Appearances: 3 (first in 2015)
- Best result: Group stage (2015, 2016, 2024)

Caribbean Cup
- Appearances: 16 (first in 1990)
- Best result: Champions (1991, 1998, 2005, 2008, 2010, 2014)
Medal record
CONCACAF Gold Cup
Silver medal – second place	2015 United States and Canada	Team
Silver medal – second place	2017 United States	Team
Bronze medal – third place	1993 Mexico and United States	Team
CONCACAF Nations League
Bronze medal – third place	2024 United States	Team
Caribbean Cup
Gold medal – first place	1991 Jamaica	Team
Gold medal – first place	1998 Trinidad and Tobago and Jamaica	Team
Gold medal – first place	2005 Barbados	Team
Gold medal – first place	2008 Jamaica	Team
Gold medal – first place	2010 Martinique	Team
Gold medal – first place	2014 Jamaica	Team
Silver medal – second place	1992 Trinidad and Tobago	Team
Silver medal – second place	1993 Jamaica	Team
Silver medal – second place	2017 Martinique	Team
Bronze medal – third place	1997 Antigua and Barbuda and Saint Kitts and Nevis	Team
Bronze medal – third place	1999 Trinidad and Tobago	Team
- Website: jff.football/reggae-boyz

The Jamaica national football team represents Jamaica in men's international football, and is governed by the Jamaica Football Federation, the governing body for football in Jamaica founded in 1910. It has been a full member of FIFA since 1962, a full member of CONCACAF since 1963, and is also a member of CFU in the Caribbean Zone.

Jamaica has qualified for the FIFA World Cup once in 1998, achieving its first victory after defeating Japan 2–1. Jamaica has participated 16 times in CONCACAF's premier continental competition, finishing as runners-up twice in the CONCACAF Gold Cup (2015 and 2017). It has participated four times in League A and once in League B of the CONCACAF Nations League, finishing as third place in the 2024 Finals.

Jamaica has participated three times in the Copa América (2015, 2016, and 2024). In subcontinental competitions, the team won six Caribbean Cup titles.

== History ==
=== Early history (1893–1962) ===
In 1893, Jamaica's first football club, the Kingston Cricket Club, was formed. In 1910, the Jamaica Football Federation (JFF) was formed and controlled all of the games. The first game was played on 22 March 1925, as the opener in a three-game series against Haiti. Jamaica won the first game, 2 to 1, followed by victories of 3–0 and 1–0 in the other two. In 1926, Jamaica hosted Haiti at Sabina Park and won 6–0. At the 1930 Central American Games in Cuba, Jamaica made its first international tournament appearance and lost both games in its group.

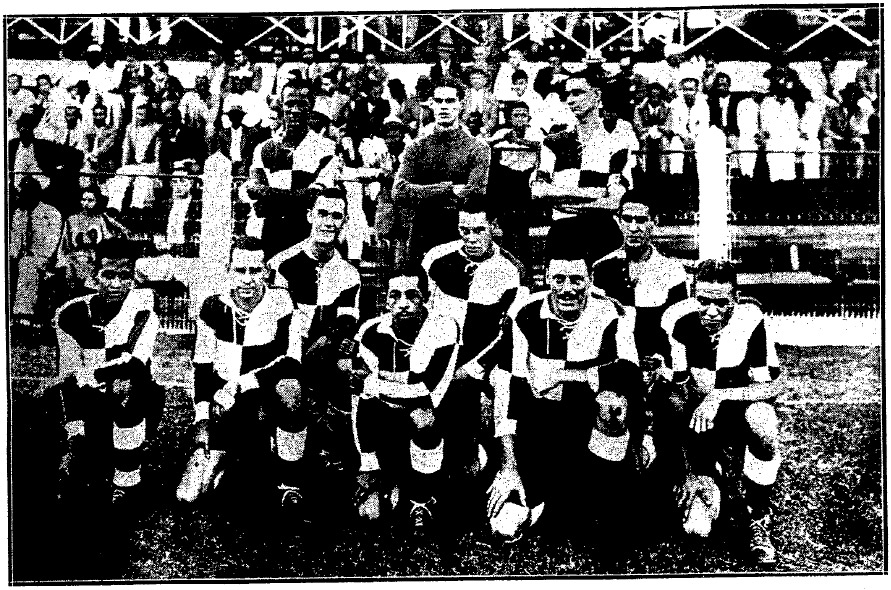
The Jamaica squad in 1936 taking on Trinidad and Tobago

From 1925 to 1962, Jamaica had regular games with teams from Trinidad and Tobago, Haiti, and Cuba, as well as with clubs like the Haitian Racing CH and Violette AC, the British Corinthians, and the Argentinean Tigers.

In 1952, the Caribbean All-Star team was formed with players from Trinidad, Cuba, Haiti, and Suriname. The team played four matches against Jamaica in Sabina Park. Jamaica won the second game 2–1 and the fourth 1–0, and the All-Stars won the first game 5–1 and the third 1–0.

=== Post-independence (1962–1989) ===
In 1962, the same year Jamaica became independent, the JFF became a member of FIFA. At the 1962 Central American and Caribbean Games played in Jamaica, the national team was led by Brazilian coach Jorge Penna. Jamaica finished in fourth place, with two wins over Puerto Rico and Cuba. A year later, Jamaica competed in the first CONCACAF Championship in El Salvador, where the team finished last in its group, which included Mexico, the Netherlands Antilles, and eventual winner Costa Rica.

In 1965, Jamaica attempted to qualify for the 1966 FIFA World Cup in England. After finishing first in its preliminary group that included Cuba and the Netherlands Antilles; Jamaica faced Costa Rica and Mexico in the final round, where the winner would qualify for the World Cup. Opening the final round campaign with a 3–2 loss at home against Mexico, Jamaica lost the return match 8–0, with Isidoro Díaz getting a hat-trick for Mexico. Jamaica then lost 7–0 to Costa Rica and ended with a draw at home in the return match, ultimately finishing with a single point. In January 1967, Jamaica attempted to qualify for the CONCACAF Championship but was eliminated after finishing third in the group of five.

In 1968, George Hamilton became the new coach as Jamaica attempted to qualify for the 1970 FIFA World Cup in Mexico. Most of the squad for the campaign was young with only a few remaining players from its previous attempt at qualifying being in the team. This was due to most of its players being either retired or migrated abroad. Jamaica finished last with zero points from four games. After finishing last in the 1969 CONCACAF Championship and not qualifying for the following championship, Jamaica had to withdraw from qualifying for the 1973 CONCACAF Championship after 17 players were suspended for poor behavior during a tour to Bermuda. In 1977, Jamaica competed in qualifying for the 1977 CONCACAF Championship, which was also the qualifier for the 1978 FIFA World Cup. Taking on Cuba in the first round, Jamaica lost both of its games 5–1 on aggregate.

Jamaica did not attempt to qualify for the 1982 and 1986 due to insufficient funds and a poorly prepared team. The team returned to international competition after qualifying for the 1989 CONCACAF Championship, which was part of the qualifiers for the 1990 FIFA World Cup in Italy. After defeating Puerto Rico 3–1 on aggregate in the preliminary round, Jamaica played the United States for a spot in the finals. After a 0–0 draw at home, Jamaica lost 5–1 in the US and was eliminated.

=== Caribbean triumph and World Cup appearance (1990–2000) ===
In 1990, Carl Brown was signed as head coach and led Jamaica into qualifying for the 1990 Caribbean Cup, finishing tied for third place after the final round was abandoned due to Tropical Storm Arthur. In 1991, Jamaica defeated Trinidad and Tobago 2–0 to win the Caribbean Cup and qualify for the CONCACAF Gold Cup. In the Gold Cup, Jamaica finished last with zero points in a group consisting of Honduras, Mexico, and Canada.

After the Jamaicans lost to Trinidad and Tobago in the final of the 1992 Caribbean Cup, they started their campaign in preliminary rounds of qualifying for the 1994 World Cup. After defeating Puerto Rico 3–1 on aggregate in the second preliminary round, Jamaica eliminated Trinidad and Tobago and was grouped with Bermuda, Canada, and El Salvador, two of which would advance to the final round. Jamaica opened the second round with two 1–1 draws against Canada and Bermuda, but the team lost its return match in Canada after a single goal from Dale Mitchell. After a 3–2 home win over Bermuda and two losses to El Salvador, Jamaica finished in third place and was eliminated.

In 1993, Jamaica finished in second place after losing on penalties to Martinique in the final of the Caribbean Cup, which was a qualifier for the CONCACAF Gold Cup which was held later that year. During this tournament, the team opened with a 1–0 loss to the US before recording their first Gold Cup win against Honduras. After qualifying in second place with a 1–1 draw against Panama, Jamaica lost 6–1 to Mexico in the semi-final in Mexico City. After not qualifying for the final round of the 1994 Caribbean Cup despite recording its largest-ever win margin in a 12–0 win against the British Virgin Islands, the team decided to hire Brazilian René Simões to assist Brown with the goal of qualifying for the 1998 World Cup. After being eliminated in the group stage of both the 1995 Caribbean Cup by virtue of head-to-head and the 1996 Caribbean Cup, Jamaica opened its 1998 World Cup qualifiers with a 2–0 aggregate win over Suriname and defeated Barbados 3–0 in the following round. In 1997, Simões, by then promoted to head coach, scouted for players in England that had Jamaican heritage to join the national team. Paul Hall, Fitzroy Simpson, Deon Burton and Robbie Earle were all named in the squad due their heritage. The term 'UB40' became used in Jamaica and more widely to describe their British-born players such as Hall and Gayle, the term is a nod to the English band UB40, who perform reggae, a genre of music that originated in Jamaica. After finishing winless in the first four games of the final qualifying round, Jamaica recorded three 1–0 wins over El Salvador, Canada, and Costa Rica, with Burton scoring the winning goal in each of the latter two matches. After a 0–0 draw against Mexico, Jamaica secured its qualification and made its first-ever World Cup appearance, and the following day was declared a national holiday.

In 1998, Jamaica competed at the 1998 CONCACAF Gold Cup, finishing first in a group comprising World Cup champion Brazil, Guatemala, and El Salvador. With the help of goalkeeper Warren Barrett, Jamaica opened with a 0–0 tie against Brazil. After wins over Guatemala and El Salvador, Jamaica advanced to the semi-final against Mexico. The match went into overtime before Mexican player Luis Hernandez scored the winning goal. In the third-place playoff, Jamaica lost 1–0 to Brazil, ending in fourth place. At the 1998 FIFA World Cup, Jamaica finished third in Group H with three points from a 2–1 win against Japan in Lyon. Theodore Whitmore scored both goals in the victory.

The following month, Jamaica competed in the finals of the 1998 Caribbean Cup, which was a qualifier for the 2000 CONCACAF Gold Cup. After finishing first in its group, Jamaica won the final 2–1 against Trinidad and Tobago, with goals from Oneil McDonald and Dean Sewell. In 1999, Jamaica experienced its biggest defeat in a 9–0 loss against Costa Rica. After finishing second in its group, Jamaica was eliminated by Cuba in the semi-finals of the 1999 Caribbean Cup. At the Gold Cup, Jamaica finished last in its group, losing against Colombia and Honduras 2–0 and 1–0, respectively.

=== Struggles at continental level (2001–2009) ===
In the 2002 FIFA World Cup qualification semi-finals, Jamaica faced Honduras, El Salvador, and Saint Vincent and the Grenadines in the second group. Jamaica finished second, securing a spot in the final round despite losing two games to Honduras and El Salvador. In the final round of qualifying, Jamaica finished in fifth place after being eliminating by Honduras. Between the two rounds of World Cup qualifying, Jamaica was eliminated in the group stage of the 2001 Caribbean Cup by goal-difference and missed out on qualifying for the Gold Cup the following year. Jamaica qualified for the 2003 Gold Cup, reaching the quarter-finals before being eliminated by Mexico 5–0 at the Estadio Azteca.

Jamaica started its 2006 FIFA World Cup qualifying campaign in the second round with a 4–1 aggregate win over Haiti to reach the third round. Jamaica finished third in group play, with a 1–1 draw against the US and one point away from reaching the next round. Coach Sebastião Lazaroni was sacked due to the team's performance. In the 2005 Caribbean Cup, Jamaica tied its largest-ever win margin record with a 12–0 win over Saint Martin, with Luton Shelton and Roland Dean both getting hat-tricks. After reaching the final with wins against Saint Lucia and French Guiana, Jamaica claimed its third title and a spot at the Gold Cup. At the Gold Cup, Jamaica reached the quarter-finals before losing to the US 3–1 in Foxborough, with American player DaMarcus Beasley scoring two goals.

In 2006 and 2007, Jamaica continued to struggle, with one Jamaican journalist dubbing the team "The Reggae Toyz". The team failed to qualify for the 2007 Caribbean Cup after being eliminated due to goals scored, with St. Vincent and the Grenadines scoring three more goals than Jamaica. Two managers later, the team only earned a single point from three matches in the third round of qualification for the 2010 FIFA World Cup. With coach Theodore Whitmore, Jamaica secured three wins from its remaining matches, jumping from their lowest-ever world ranking of 116th all the way to 83rd place. Despite the team's final win over Canada, Jamaica was eliminated by goal difference after Mexico finished three goals ahead. Jamaica won the 2008 Caribbean Cup, with Luton Shelton scoring both goals in the victory against Grenada to qualify for the Gold Cup. At the Gold Cup, Jamaica finished third in its group; with a single win over El Salvador, the side finished last among the third-place teams and was eliminated.

=== Continental finals appearances (2010–2019) ===
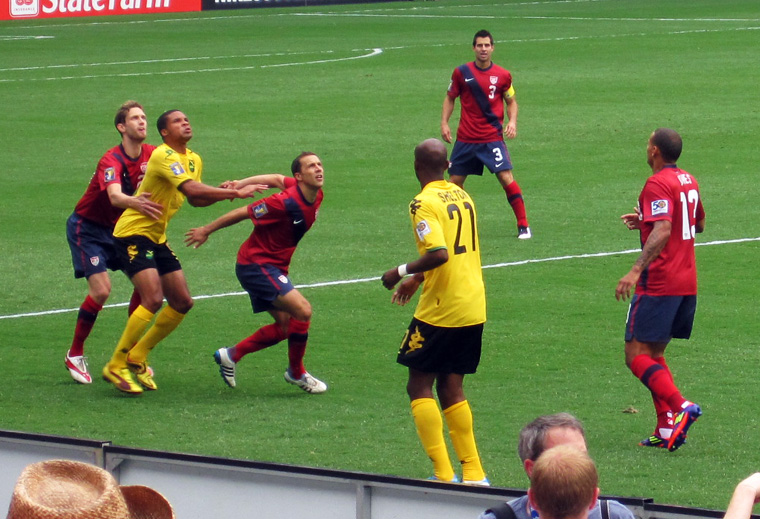
Jamaica taking on the United States at the 2011 CONCACAF Gold Cup

Jamaica entered the final round of the 2010 Caribbean Cup after a 0–0 draw with Costa Rica. After finishing first in its group, Jamaica won against Grenada in the semi-finals, then defeating first-time finalists Guadeloupe in a penalty shoot-out. Jamaica earned its fifth title, and coach Theodore Whitmore became the first to win the Caribbean Cup as both player and coach. In the 2011 CONCACAF Gold Cup, Jamaica finished first in its group, beating Grenada 4–0, Guatemala 2–0, and Honduras 1–0 before being eliminated by the US, with goals from American players Jermaine Jones and Clint Dempsey.

In qualifying for the 2014 FIFA World Cup, Jamaica started in the third round and earned seven points in the first three games, which included a historic 2–1 win over the United States at home which was their first win over the Americans. Jamaica later qualified with a 4–1 win over Antigua and Barbuda, finishing two goals ahead of Guatemala in its group. After the team finished last in its group for the 2012 Caribbean Cup and failed to record a win in six matches in the fourth round of qualifying, team manager Theodore Whitmore resigned and was replaced by German coach Winfried Schäfer. After a 2–0 loss to the US, Jamaica finished in last place and was eliminated.

After qualifying for the 2015 Gold Cup due to winning the 2014 Caribbean Cup, Jamaica was invited to compete in the 2015 edition of the Copa América in Chile. At the Copa America, Jamaica was drawn in Group B with Uruguay, Paraguay, and Argentina. Jamaica finished last after losing all three of its matches 1–0, with Jobi McAnuff saying, "I don't think many people would have given us that chance." A few weeks later in the 2015 Gold Cup, Jamaica finished first in its group and defeated Haiti in the quarter-finals with a goal from Giles Barnes to qualify for the semi-finals for the first time since 1998. In the semi-final, Jamaica defeated the US 2–1 with goals from Darren Mattocks and Giles Barnes, reaching its first-ever Gold Cup final. In the final, Jamaica lost to Mexico 3–1.

In qualifying for the 2018 FIFA World Cup, Jamaica started in the third round and defeated Nicaragua 4–3 on aggregate to reach the fourth round. In the fourth round, Jamaica started off strong with a 1–0 win over Haiti and a 1–1 draw with Costa Rica, earning four points after three games. However, three straight losses, including a 2–0 loss against Panama, eliminated Jamaica from World Cup qualifying. Between the fourth-round matches, Jamaica competed in the Copa América Centenario after qualifying through the 2014 Caribbean Cup. Jamaica finished with no points from their three games, scoring no goals and conceding six.

After Whitmore returned to the team, Jamaica qualified for the 2017 Caribbean Cup, reaching the final before losing to first-time finalists Curaçao 2–1, with Elson Hooi scoring both of Curaçao's goals. In the 2017 Gold Cup, Jamaica upset Mexico 1–0 in the semi-finals, with Kemar Lawrence scoring the goal. In the final against the US, Jamaica conceded the opening goal at the end of the first half before Je-Vaughn Watson tied the score in the 50th minute. However, after a goal in the 88th minute from Jordan Morris, the US won the title, and Jamaica finished as runner-up.

=== Recent years (2020–present) ===
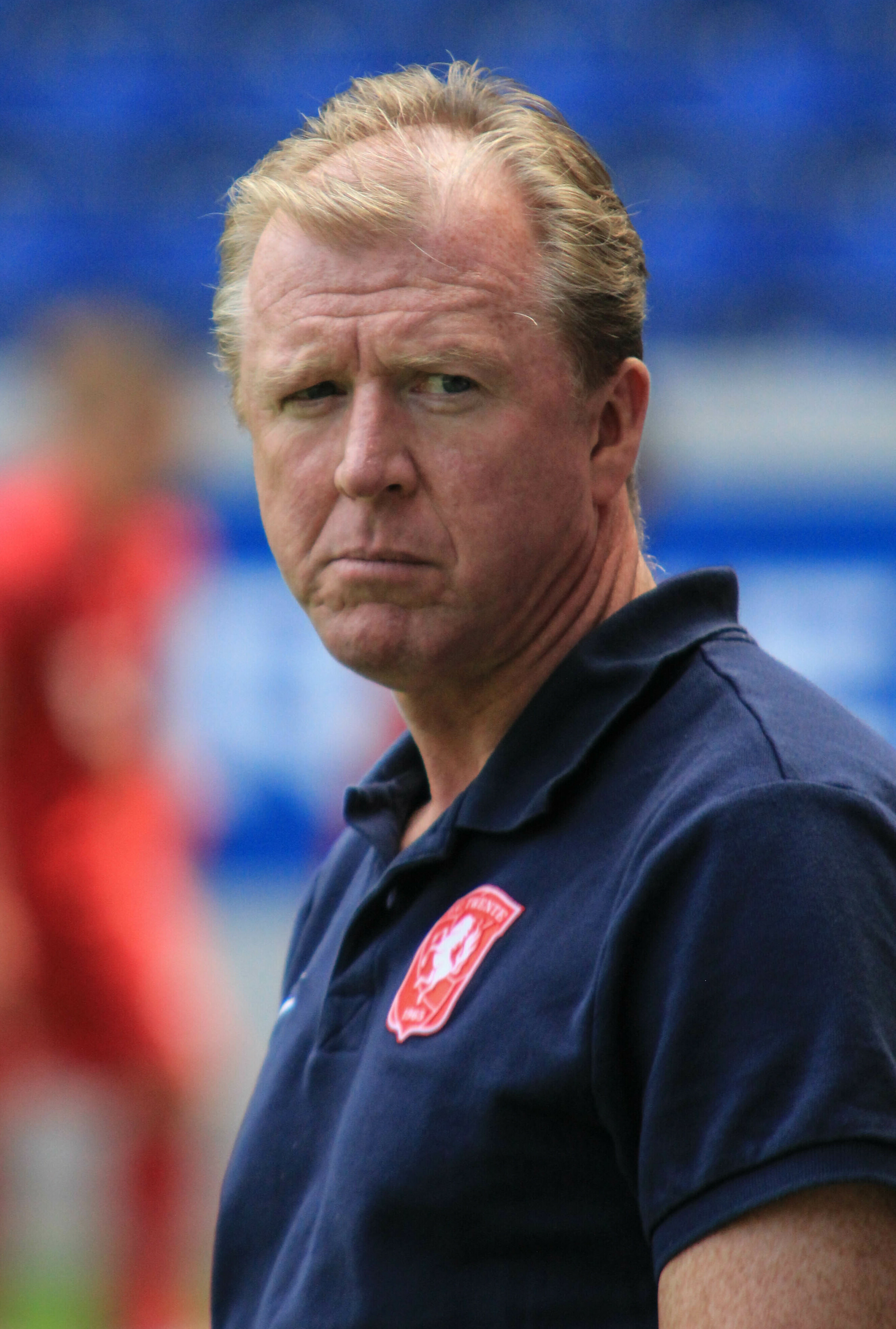
Steve McClaren became the manager of the national football team of Jamaica in 2024

In 2020, Jamaica played a single international friendly versus Bermuda before all international football was placed on hold by FIFA due to the COVID-19 pandemic.

In 2021, Jamaica reached the 2021 Gold Cup quarterfinals, where they lost 0–1 to the United States. On 9 December 2021, Theodore Whitmore was dismissed as senior national team head coach.

In September 2022, Icelander Heimir Hallgrímsson was hired as Jamaica's new coach. But he resigned after the Reggae Boyz competed at the 2024 Copa América, even though he had signed a contract to coach the team through the 2026 World Cup qualification campaign.

Oral Tracey of Television Jamaica, one of the biggest networks in the country, said:

"I think the coach disrespected Jamaica. He was contracted and agreed to pilot Jamaica’s 2026 World Cup bid. And after two games he was gone. Obviously ... he had one foot in and one foot out. When you look at some of the team selections and substitutions for those two games we have to wonder."

On 21 November 2023, Jamaica qualified for the 2024 Copa América by reaching the 2023–24 CONCACAF Nations League A semifinals on a 3–2 comeback against Canada. Jamaica had previously lost 2–1 on the first leg, however, the victory resulted in a 4–4 goal aggregate tie that went in their favour after winning 3–2 on away goals.

== Stadium ==
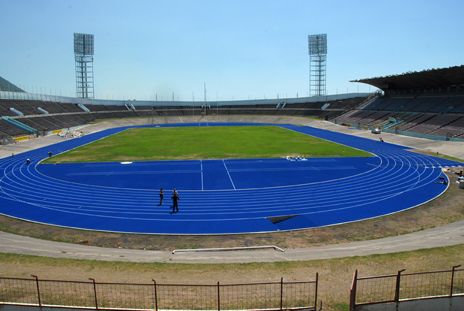
Independence Park in 2011

Between 1926 and 1962. Jamaica played its matches at Sabina Park, which is also home to the West Indies cricket team. In 1962, the football team moved to Independence Park, which was built for the 1962 Central American and Caribbean Games held after the country gained independence; the first home match was a 6–1 victory over Puerto Rico. The stadium is nicknamed The Office while the team plays.

The team has also played at Jarrett Park and Trelawny Stadium at the 2008 Caribbean Cup. They have also played at the Montego Bay Sports Complex in the 2014 Caribbean Cup.

== Kits ==
The national team have used four clothing manufacturers to supply the official kit for Jamaica. The team's first supplier was Italian manufacturer Lanzera in 1995 before it merged with Kappa a year later. This deal was terminated after the 1998 World Cup. In 2000, the JFF signed a deal with German sporting brand Uhlsport, which lasted until 2006. After another three-year contract with Kappa between 2012 and 2014, the JFF signed a four-year deal with Emirati sportswear company Romai Sports for US$4.8 million.

In 2021, Umbro was the kit provider for Jamaica. In 2022, Adidas signed a deal to become the new kit provider for Jamaica starting in 2023.

=== Kit sponsorship ===
Kit supplier	Period
(United States) Score	1993
(Italy) Lanzera / Kappa	1995–1998
(Germany) Uhlsport	2000–2006
(Italy) Kappa	2008–2014
(United Arab Emirates) Romai	2015–2018
(England) Umbro	2018–2022
(Germany) Adidas	2023–present

== Results and fixtures ==
The following is a list of match results in the last 12 months, as well as any future matches that have been scheduled.

Win Draw Loss Fixture

=== 2025 ===
13 November 2026 FIFA World Cup qualification – CONCACAF third round	Trinidad and Tobago	1–1	Jamaica	Port of Spain, Trinidad and Tobago
20:00 UTC−4	Molino 85'	Report	Cephas 53'	Stadium: Hasely Crawford Stadium; Referee: Walter López Castellanos (Guatemala)

18 November 2026 FIFA World Cup qualification – CONCACAF third round	Jamaica	0–0	Curaçao	Kingston, Jamaica
20:00 UTC−4		Report		Stadium: Independence Park; Attendance: 40,567; Referee: Iván Barton (El Salvador)

=== 2026 ===
18 January Friendly	Grenada	0–1	Jamaica	St. George's, Grenada
15:00 UTC−4		Report	N. Fuller 81'	Stadium: Kirani James Stadium

22 February Friendly	Martinique	0–2	Jamaica	Fort-de-France, Martinique
19:00 UTC−4		Report	Ellis 22'; Green 64'	Stadium: Stade Pierre-Aliker

26 March 2026 FIFA World Cup inter-confederation play-offs	New Caledonia	0–1	Jamaica	Guadalajara, Mexico
21:00 UTC−6		Report	Cadamarteri 18'	Stadium: Estadio Akron, Zapopan; Attendance: 40,983; Referee: Gustavo Tejera (Uruguay)

31 March 2026 FIFA WC inter-confederation play-offs	DR Congo	1–0 (a.e.t.)	Jamaica	Guadalajara, Mexico
15:00 UTC−6	Tuanzebe 100'	Report		Stadium: Estadio Akron; Attendance: 39,983; Referee: Facundo Tello (Argentina) (Note: Tello suffered an injury in the 114th minute and was replaced by fourth official Darío Herrera (Argentina).)

27 May 2026 Unity Cup	Jamaica	2–0	India	London, England
19:30 UTC+1	Clarke 8'; Dixon 78'			Stadium: The Valley; Referee: Darren England (England)

30 May 2026 Unity Cup	Nigeria	3–0	Jamaica	London, England
19:30 UTC+1	Yusuf 3', 90+1'; Moffi 59'			Stadium: The Valley

6 June Friendly	Jamaica	1–1	South Africa	Pachuca, Mexico (BCD)
15:30 UTC−6	Atkinson 90+3'	Report	Appollis 32'	Stadium: Estadio Hidalgo

25 September 2026–27 CONCACAF Nations League A Group Stage	Jamaica	3–2	Guatemala	Kingston, Jamaica
20:00 (19:00 UTC−5)	Palmer 37'; Burrell 53'; Cephas 90+4'	Report	Santis 2', 67'	Stadium: Independence Park; Referee: Keylor Herrera (Costa Rica)

28 September 2026–27 CONCACAF Nations League A Group Stage	Jamaica	0–1	Honduras	Kingston, Jamaica
19:00 UTC−5		Report	Figueroa 14'	Stadium: Independence Park

2 October 2026–27 CONCACAF Nations League A Group Stage	El Salvador	0–2	Jamaica	San Salvador, El Salvador
20:00 UTC−6		Report	East 39', 64'	Stadium: Estadio Cuscatlán

5 October 2026–27 CONCACAF Nations League A Group Stage	Honduras	1–1	Jamaica	Tegucigalpa, Honduras
20:00 UTC−6		Report		Stadium: Estadio Nacional Chelato Uclés

14 November Nations League QF 1st Leg	Jamaica	3–2	Mexico	Kingston, Jamaica
20:00 UTC−5	Gallardo 27' (o.g.); Cephas 46'; King 63' (pen.)	Report	Mora 70'; Quiñones 81' (pen.)	Stadium: Independence Park; Attendance: 5,893; Referee: Mario Escobar (Guatemala)

17 November Nations League QF 2nd Leg	Mexico	1–0 (3 (a)–3 agg.)	Jamaica	Guadalupe, Mexico
20:30 UTC−6	Corona 35'	Report		Stadium: Estadio BBVA; Referee: Juan Gabriel Calderón (Costa Rica)

13 December Friendly	United States	v	Jamaica	Fort Lauderdale, United States
15:00 UTC−4				Stadium: Inter Miami CF Stadium

=== 2027 ===
March 2027 2026–27 CONCACAF Nations League	Jamaica	v	Aruba	Aruba
20:30 UTC−6

March 2027 2026–27 CONCACAF Nations League	Aruba	v	Jamaica	Jamaica
20:30 UTC−6

== Coaching staff ==
Coaching staff
Position	Name
Head of Delegation	(Jamaica) Errol Stevens
Head coach	(Jamaica) Rudolph Speid
Assistant coach	(England) Michael Donaldson
Goalkeeper coach	vacant
Fitness coach	(Jamaica) Lamar Morgan
Video Analyst	(Jamaica) Kyle Chin
Team Doctor	(Jamaica) Dr. Derrick McDowell
Physiotherapist	(Jamaica) Dr. Kevin Christie
Physiotherapist	(Jamaica) Christopher Kelly
Team Chef	(Jamaica) Karl Thomas
Press Officer	(Jamaica) Simon Preston
Kit & Equipment	(Jamaica) Norman Stone
Massage Therapist	(Jamaica) Alvin Green
Massage Therapist	(England) Rod Thornley
Technical staff
Position	Name
Technical Director	(Jamaica) Wendell Downswell
General Manager	(Jamaica) Roy Simpson

=== Coaching history ===
Caretaker managers are listed in italics.

- (Brazil) Jorge Penna (1962, 1965–1967)
- (Haiti) Antoine Tassy (1962–1964)
- (Jamaica) George Hamilton (1967)
- (Jamaica) George Thomson (1967–1974)
- (Jamaica) George Prescod (1974–1975, 1975–1978)
- (West Germany) Otmar Calder (1975)
- (Jamaica) Jackie Bell (1978–1982)
- (Jamaica) Carl Brown (1983–1986, 1990–1994, 2001–2004)
- (Jamaica) Allie McNab (1987)
- (Jamaica) Delroy Scott (1987–1988)
- (Brazil) René Simões (1994–2000, 2008)
- (Brazil) Sebastião Lazaroni (2000)
- (Brazil) Clovis de Oliveira (2000–2001)
- (Brazil) Sebastião Lazaroni (2004–2005)
- (Jamaica) Wendell Downswell (2005–2006)
- (Jamaica) Carl Brown (2006)
- (Serbia) Bora Milutinović (2006–2007)
- (England) John Barnes (2008–2009)
- (Jamaica) Theodore Whitmore (2009–2013, 2016–2021)
- (Germany) Winfried Schäfer (2013–2016)
- (Jamaica) Paul Hall (2021–2022)
- (Jamaica) Merron Gordon (2022)
- (Iceland) Heimir Hallgrímsson (2022–2024)
- (England) Steve McClaren (2024–2025)
- (Jamaica) Rudolph Speid (2025–2026)

== Players ==
=== Current squad ===
The following players were called up for the 2026–27 CONCACAF Nations League A matches against Mexico on 15 and 18 November 2026.

Information correct as of 5 October 2026, after the match against Honduras.

No.	Pos.	Player	Date of birth (age)	Caps	Goals	Club
	GK	Andre Blake	21 November 1990 (age 35)	98	0	(United States Soccer Federation) Philadelphia Union
	GK	Jahmali Waite	24 December 1998 (age 27)	17	0	(United States Soccer Federation) Tampa Bay Rowdies
	GK	Amal Knight	19 November 1993 (age 33)	14	0	(United States Soccer Federation) Greenville Triumph
	GK	Joshua Grant	27 May 2007 (age 19)	0	0	(United States Soccer Federation) FC Naples
	DF	Damion Lowe	5 May 1993 (age 33)	84	4	(Football Association of Indonesia) Dewa United Banten
	DF	Richard King	27 November 2001 (age 24)	44	1	(Scottish Football Association) St Mirren
	DF	Joel Latibeaudiere	6 January 2000 (age 26)	34	0	(The Football Association) Coventry City
	DF	Kyle Ming	25 January 1999 (age 27)	10	0	(Jamaica Football Federation) Mount Pleasant
	DF	Ronaldo Webster	4 July 2001 (age 25)	9	0	(Romanian Football Federation) Universitatea Craiova
	DF	Christopher Ainsworth	31 August 2005 (age 21)	6	0	(Jamaica Football Federation) Cavalier
	DF	Jeovanni Laing	21 December 2000 (age 25)	0	0	(Jamaica Football Federation) Cavalier
	DF	Miguel Freckleton	6 August 2003 (age 23)	3	0	(Austrian Football Association) LASK
	DF	Denzel Hall	22 May 2001 (age 25)	0	0	(The Football Association) Rotherham United
	MF	Kevon Lambert	22 March 1997 (age 29)	29	0	(United States Soccer Federation) Louisville City
	MF	Karoy Anderson	1 October 2004 (age 22)	23	0	(The Football Association) Blackpool
	MF	Courtney Clarke	20 April 2003 (age 23)	6	1	(The Football Association) Walsall
	MF	Brandon Cover	25 September 2003 (age 23)	5	0	(The Football Association) Rotherham United
	MF	Tyrese Hall	4 September 2005 (age 21)	2	0	(The Football Association) Tottenham Hotspur
	FW	Renaldo Cephas	8 October 1999 (age 27)	30	4	(Association of Football Federations of Azerbaijan) Qarabağ
	FW	Kaheim Dixon	4 October 2004 (age 22)	31	4	(Football Association of Serbia) Novi Pazar
	FW	Javon East	22 March 1995 (age 31)	24	4	(Israel Football Association) Hapoel Be'er Sheva
	FW	Tyreece Campbell	14 September 2003 (age 23)	12	1	(The Football Association) Charlton Athletic
	FW	Warner Brown	19 August 2002 (age 24)	10	4	(Jamaica Football Federation) Mount Pleasant
	FW	Daniel Green	10 June 1997 (age 29)	7	1	(Jamaica Football Federation) Mount Pleasant
	FW	Dwight Merrick	23 May 2003 (age 23)	3	0	(Jamaica Football Federation) Montego Bay United
	FW	Khori Bennett	13 December 1997 (age 28)	0	0	(United States Soccer Federation) Colorado Springs Switchbacks
	FW	Ricky-Jade Jones	8 November 2002 (age 24)	0	0	(German Football Association) St. Pauli

=== Recent call-ups ===
The following players have been called up to the national team in the past 12 months but are not part of the current squad.

Pos.	Player	Date of birth (age)	Caps	Goals	Club	Latest call-up
GK	Shaquan Davis	11 November 2000 (age 26)	3	0	(Jamaica) Mount Pleasant	v. Honduras, 5 October 2026
GK	Coniah Boyce-Clarke	1 March 2003 (age 23)	1	0	(England) Aldershot Town	2026 Unity Cup
GK	Tafari Chambers	1 September 2000 (age 26)	1	0	(Jamaica) Mount Pleasant	2026 Unity Cup
GK	Joshua Grant	27 May 2007 (age 19)	0	0	(United States) FC Naples	2026 Unity Cup
GK	Jayden Hibbert	5 August 2004 (age 22)	2	0	(United States) Atlanta United	v. New Caledonia, 26 March 2026 ^{PRE}
GK	Corey Addai	10 October 1997 (age 29)	0	0	(England) Stockport County	v. New Caledonia, 26 March 2026 ^{PRE}
GK	Daniel Russell	10 February 2001 (age 25)	0	0	(Jamaica) Portmore United	v. Martinique, 22 February 2026
GK	Kemar Foster	30 August 1992 (age 34)	4	0	(Jamaica) Mount Pleasant	v. Grenada, 18 January 2026
DF	Tayvon Gray	19 August 2002 (age 24)	9	0	(United States) New York City	v. Honduras, 5 October 2026
DF	Dexter Lembikisa	4 November 2003 (age 23)	35	1	Free agent	2026 Unity Cup
DF	Jeovanni Laing	21 December 2000 (age 25)	0	0	(Jamaica) Cavalier	2026 Unity Cup
DF	Odin Samuels-Smith	5 June 2006 (age 20)	0	0	(England) Everton	2026 Unity Cup
DF	Marlon van de Wetering	26 November 2007 (age 18)	0	0	(Netherlands) Excelsior	2026 Unity Cup
DF	Amari'i Bell	5 May 1994 (age 32)	31	2	(England) Charlton Athletic	v. DR Congo, 31 March 2026
DF	Ethan Pinnock	29 May 1993 (age 33)	28	0	(England) Brentford	v. DR Congo, 31 March 2026
DF	Ian Fray	31 August 2002 (age 24)	3	0	(United States) Inter Miami	v. DR Congo, 31 March 2026
DF	Greg Leigh	30 September 1994 (age 32)	31	1	(England) Oxford United	v. New Caledonia, 26 March 2026 ^{PRE}
DF	Mason Holgate	22 October 1996 (age 30)	10	0	(Qatar) Al-Sailiya	v. New Caledonia, 26 March 2026 ^{PRE}
DF	Rico Henry	8 July 1997 (age 29)	1	0	(England) Brentford	v. New Caledonia, 26 March 2026 ^{PRE}
DF	Max Aarons	4 January 2000 (age 26)	0	0	(Scotland) Rangers	v. New Caledonia, 26 March 2026 ^{PRE}
DF	Kyle Duncan	8 August 1997 (age 29)	0	0	(United States) Minnesota United	v. New Caledonia, 26 March 2026 ^{PRE}
DF	Tarick Ximines	7 October 2004 (age 22)	2	0	(Jamaica) Portmore United	v. Martinique, 22 February 2026
DF	Kymani Campbell	23 July 1999 (age 27)	1	0	(Jamaica) Waterhouse	v. Martinique, 22 February 2026
DF	Fitzroy Cummings	23 November 1997 (age 28)	0	0	(Jamaica) Mount Pleasant	v. Martinique, 22 February 2026
DF	Robino Gordon	14 November 2005 (age 21)	0	0	(Jamaica) Chapelton Maroons	v. Martinique, 22 February 2026
DF	Stephen Young	22 July 2001 (age 25)	0	0	(Jamaica) Portmore United	v. Martinique, 22 February 2026
DF	Javain Brown	9 March 1999 (age 27)	29	0	(United States) Lexington SC	v. Grenada, 18 January 2026
MF	Kasey Palmer	9 November 1996 (age 30)	25	3	(England) Luton Town	v. Honduras, 5 October 2026
MF	Isaac Hayden	22 March 1995 (age 31)	17	0	(England) Leyton Orient	v. Honduras, 5 October 2026
MF	Dwayne Atkinson	5 May 2002 (age 24)	9	0	(United States) Rhode Island	v. Honduras, 5 October 2026
MF	Ramone Howell	15 April 1995 (age 31)	6	0	(Jamaica) Portmore United	v. Honduras, 5 October 2026
MF	Andre Brooks	20 August 2003 (age 23)	1	0	(England) Norwich City	v. Honduras, 5 October 2026
MF	Bobby De Cordova-Reid	2 February 1993 (age 33)	45	7	(England) Leicester City	v. DR Congo, 31 March 2026
MF	Daniel Johnson	8 October 1992 (age 34)	26	3	(Turkey) Fatih Karagümrük	v. New Caledonia, 26 March 2026 ^{PRE}
MF	Ravel Morrison	2 February 1993 (age 33)	21	2	(United Arab Emirates) Arabian Falcons	v. New Caledonia, 26 March 2026 ^{PRE}
MF	Tyreek Magee	9 October 2000 (age 26)	14	0	(Jamaica) Mount Pleasant	v. New Caledonia, 26 March 2026 ^{PRE}
MF	Dwayne Allen	9 February 2002 (age 24)	0	0	(Jamaica) Cavalier	v. Martinique, 22 February 2026
MF	Adrian Reid	5 September 2006 (age 20)	0	0	(Jamaica) Cavalier	v. Martinique, 22 February 2026
MF	Jaheim Thomas	21 June 2003 (age 23)	0	0	(Jamaica) Arnett Gardens	v. Martinique, 22 February 2026
MF	Shamar Watson	28 July 2004 (age 22)	0	0	(Jamaica) Cavalier	v. Martinique, 22 February 2026
MF	Jahshaun Anglin	6 May 2001 (age 25)	12	0	(Jamaica) Mount Pleasant	v. Grenada, 18 January 2026
MF	Andre Lewis	12 August 1994 (age 32)	3	0	(United States) Spokane Velocity	v. Grenada, 18 January 2026
MF	Jon Russell	9 October 2000 (age 26)	17	5	(England) Mansfield Town	v. Curaçao, 18 November 2025
FW	Leon Bailey	9 August 1997 (age 29)	41	7	(Greece) Olympiacos	v. Honduras, 5 October 2026
FW	Bailey Cadamarteri	9 May 2005 (age 21)	11	2	(Wales) Wrexham	v. Honduras, 5 October 2026
FW	Rumarn Burrell	16 December 2000 (age 25)	6	2	(England) Queens Park Rangers	v. Honduras, 5 October 2026
FW	Jahmarie Nolan	11 November 2009 (age 17)	2	0	(Canada) Toronto FC II	v. Honduras, 5 October 2026
FW	Jamone Lyle^{TRP}	10 July 2009 (age 17)	1	0	(Jamaica) Waterhouse	v. Honduras, 5 October 2026
FW	Tajay Grant^{TRP}	12 January 2002 (age 24)	1	0	(Jamaica) Racing United	v. Honduras, 5 October 2026
FW	Dajaune Brown	16 October 2005 (age 21)	0	0	(England) Port Vale	2026 Unity Cup
FW	Caelan Cadamarteri	3 November 2009 (age 17)	0	0	(England) Manchester City	2026 Unity Cup
FW	Raheem Edwards	14 August 2002 (age 24)	0	0	(Jamaica) Mount Pleasant	2026 Unity Cup
FW	Nickalia Fuller	16 December 2004 (age 21)	0	0	(Jamaica) Tivoli Gardens	2026 Unity Cup
FW	Nicholas Simmonds	17 December 2006 (age 19)	0	0	(United States) FC Dallas	2026 Unity Cup
FW	Demarai Gray	28 June 1996 (age 30)	29	7	(England) Birmingham City	v. DR Congo, 31 March 2026
FW	Jamal Lowe	21 July 1994 (age 32)	10	0	(England) Sheffield Wednesday	v. DR Congo, 31 March 2026
FW	Norman Campbell	24 November 1999 (age 26)	8	0	(Japan) V-Varen Nagasaki	v. DR Congo, 31 March 2026
FW	Ephron Mason-Clark	25 August 1999 (age 27)	2	0	(England) Coventry City	v. DR Congo, 31 March 2026
FW	Shamar Nicholson (Third Captain)	16 February 1997 (age 29)	62	21	(Belarus) Maxline Vitebsk	v. New Caledonia, 26 March 2026 ^{PRE}
FW	Cory Burke	28 June 1996 (age 30)	35	9	Free agent	v. New Caledonia, 26 March 2026 ^{PRE}
FW	Dujuan Richards	10 November 2005 (age 21)	14	2	(England) AFC Wimbledon	v. New Caledonia, 26 March 2026 ^{PRE}
FW	Trivante Stewart	22 March 2000 (age 26)	4	0	(Israel) Maccabi Haifa	v. New Caledonia, 26 March 2026 ^{PRE}
FW	Cameron Archer	9 December 2001 (age 24)	0	0	(England) Southampton	v. New Caledonia, 26 March 2026 ^{PRE}
FW	Keinan Davis	13 February 1998 (age 28)	0	0	(Italy) Udinese	v. New Caledonia, 26 March 2026 ^{PRE}
FW	Daniel Green	10 June 1997 (age 29)	7	1	(Jamaica) Mount Pleasant	v. Martinique, 22 February 2026
FW	Tajay Grant	12 January 2002 (age 24)	0	0	(Jamaica) Racing United	v. Martinique, 22 February 2026
FW	Rushike Kelson	17 November 2002 (age 24)	0	0	(Jamaica) Arnett Gardens	v. Martinique, 22 February 2026
FW	Romario Williams	15 August 1994 (age 32)	24	4	(United States) Birmingham Legion	v. Grenada, 18 January 2026
FW	Jourdaine Fletcher	23 September 1997 (age 29)	8	2	(Vietnam) Hải Phòng	v. Grenada, 18 January 2026
FW	Trayvone Reid	25 February 2000 (age 26)	0	0	(Jamaica) Harbour View	v. Grenada, 18 January 2026
^{INJ} Withdrew from the squad due to injury / absent from the national team due to injury.^{WD} Withdrew from the squad for personal reasons.^{PRE} Preliminary squad / standby.^{RET} Retired from the national team.

== Player records ==
As of 14 October 2025
Players in bold are still active with Jamaica.

=== Most appearances ===
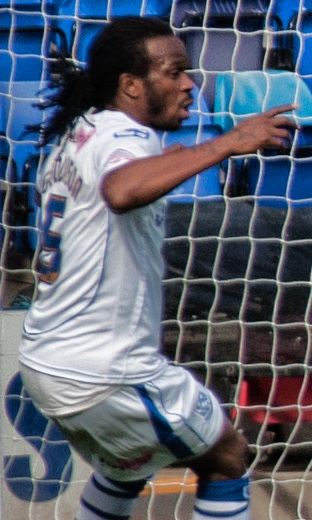
Ian Goodison is Jamaica's most capped player with 128 appearances.

Rank	Player	Caps	Goals	Career
1	Ian Goodison	128	10	1996–2008
2	Linval Dixon	127	3	1993–2003
3	Theodore Whitmore	120	24	1993–2004
4	Ricardo Gardner	111	9	1997–2012
5	Warren Barrett	108	0	1990–2000
6	Andy Williams	107	22	1997–2008
7	Durrant Brown	102	0	1984–1998
8	Jermaine Taylor	101	0	2004–2017
9	Donovan Ricketts	100	0	1999–2013
10	**Andre Blake**	98	0	2014-Present

=== Top goalscorers ===
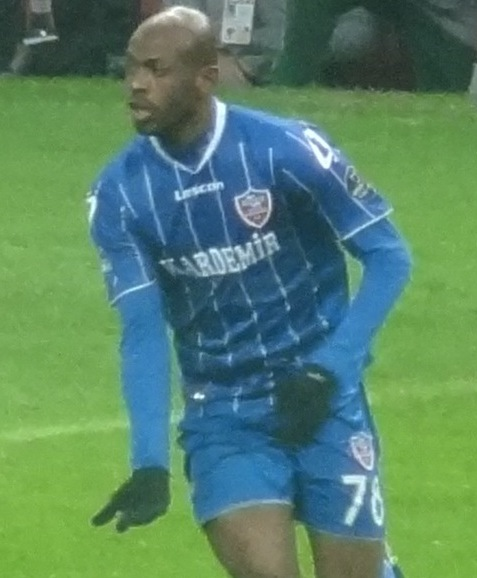
Luton Shelton is Jamaica's top scorer with 35 goals.

Rank	Player	Goals	Caps	Ratio	Career
1	Luton Shelton	35	75	0.47	2004–2013
2	Onandi Lowe	27	81	0.33	1995–2004
3	Theodore Whitmore	24	120	0.2	1993–2004
4	Paul Young	22	49	0.45	1989–1997
4	Andy Williams	22	107	0.21	1997–2008
6	**Shamar Nicholson**	21	61	0.34	2017–present
7	Walter Boyd	19	75	0.25	1991–2001
8	Darren Mattocks	18	50	0.36	2012–2019
8	Paul Davis	18	61	0.3	1983–1997
10	Hector Wright	16	71	0.23	1988–1997

== Competitive record ==
Overview
Event	Titles	Runners-up	3rd place	4th place
World Cup	0	0	0	0
CONCACAF Gold Cup	0	2	2	2
CONCACAF Nations League	0	0	1	0
Caribbean Cup	6	3	2	0
Copa América	0	0	0	0

=== FIFA World Cup ===
Jamaica's only appearance at the FIFA World Cup was in 1998. The team opened with a 3–1 loss against Croatia in Lens. After falling behind in the 27th minute, Robbie Earle scored the equalizer to close the first half. In the second half, Croatia scored two goals, causing Jamaica to lose the match. The second match against Argentina saw Gabriel Batistuta getting a second half hat-trick, aiding in Jamaica's second defeat and elimination from the World Cup. In the final match of the tournament, Theodore Whitmore scored a double, securing Jamaica's first World Cup win with a 2–1 win over Japan, whilst also allowing Jamaica to become the second team from the Caribbean after Cuba to have won a World Cup game.

FIFA World Cup											Qualification					
Year	Host	Round	Pos.	Pld	W	D	L	F	A	Squad	Pld	W	D	L	F	A
1930 to 1962		Not a FIFA member									Not a FIFA member					
1966	England	Did not qualify									8	2	2	4	8	21
1970	Mexico	Did not qualify									4	0	0	4	2	11
1974	West Germany	Withdrew									Withdrew					
1978	Argentina	Did not qualify									2	0	0	2	1	5
1982	Spain	Did not participate									Declined participation					
1986	Mexico	Withdrew									Withdrew					
1990	Italy	Did not qualify									4	2	1	1	4	6
1994	United States	Did not qualify									10	4	3	3	12	12
1998	France	Group stage	22nd	3	1	0	2	3	9	Squad	20	11	6	3	24	15
2002	Japan; South Korea	Did not qualify									16	6	2	8	14	18
2006	Germany	Did not qualify									8	2	5	1	11	6
2010	South Africa	Did not qualify									8	5	1	2	19	6
2014	Brazil	Did not qualify									16	3	6	7	14	19
2018	Russia	Did not qualify									8	2	1	5	6	13
2022	Qatar	Did not qualify									14	2	5	7	12	22
2026	Canada; Mexico; United States	Did not qualify									12	8	2	2	20	6
2030	Morocco; Portugal; Spain	To be determined									To be determined					
2034	Saudi Arabia	To be determined									To be determined					
Total:1/15		Group stage	22nd	3	1	0	2	3	9	—	130	47	34	49	147	160

FIFA World Cup history
First match	Jamaica 1–3 Croatia (14 June 1998; Lens, France)
Biggest Win	Japan 1–2 Jamaica (26 June 1998; Lyon, France)
Biggest Defeat	Argentina 5–0 Jamaica (21 June 1998; Paris, France)
Best Result	Group stage (1998)
Worst Result	—

=== CONCACAF Gold Cup ===
CONCACAF Championship 1963–1989; CONCACAF Gold Cup 1991–present

CONCACAF Championship / Gold Cup record											Qualification record					
Year	Host	Round	Position	Pld	W	D	L	GF	GA	Squad	Pld	W	D	L	GF	GA
1963	El Salvador	Group stage	8th	3	0	0	3	1	16	Squad	Qualified automatically					
1965	Guatemala	Did not participate									Did not participate					
1967	Honduras	Did not qualify									4	1	2	1	4	4
1969	Costa Rica	Round-robin	6th	5	0	1	4	3	10	Squad	2	1	1	0	3	2
1971	Trinidad and Tobago	Did not qualify									2	0	1	1	0	1
1973	Haiti	Did not participate									Did not participate					
1977	Mexico	Withdrew									Withdrew					
1981	Honduras	Did not participate									Did not participate					
1985	Multiple	Withdrew									Withdrew					
1989	Multiple	Did not qualify									4	2	1	1	4	6
1991	United States	Group stage	8th	3	0	0	3	3	12	Squad	4	4	0	0	13	2
1993	Mexico; United States	Third place	3rd	5	1	2	2	6	10	Squad	5	4	1	0	10	1
1996	United States	Did not qualify									3	2	0	1	4	3
1998	United States	Fourth place	4th	5	2	1	2	5	4	Squad	7	5	2	0	18	5
2000	United States	Group stage	12th	2	0	0	2	0	3	Squad	5	5	0	0	12	4
2002	United States	Did not qualify									3	2	0	1	4	3
2003	United States	Quarter-finals	7th	3	1	0	2	2	6	Squad	6	4	2	0	17	4
2005	United States	Quarter-finals	8th	4	1	1	2	8	10	Squad	10	8	2	0	38	5
2007	United States	Did not qualify									3	2	0	1	7	2
2009	United States	Group stage	10th	3	1	0	2	1	2	Squad	5	4	1	0	11	2
2011	United States	Quarter-finals	5th	4	3	0	1	7	2	Squad	5	4	1	0	12	3
2013	United States	Did not qualify									3	0	1	2	1	3
2015	Canada; United States	Runners-up	2nd	6	4	1	1	8	6	Squad	4	2	2	0	6	1
2017	United States	Runners-up	2nd	6	3	2	1	7	4	Squad	4	2	1	1	7	5
2019	Costa Rica; Jamaica; United States	Semi-finals	4th	5	2	2	1	6	6	Squad	4	3	0	1	12	3
2021	United States	Quarter-finals	7th	4	2	0	2	4	3	Squad	6	5	1	0	21	1
2023	Canada; United States	Semi-finals	3rd	5	3	1	1	11	5	Squad	4	1	3	0	7	5
2025	Canada; United States	Group stage	9th	3	1	0	2	3	6	Squad	6	2	2	2	6	6
Total		Runners-up	16/28	66	24	11	31	75	105	—	99	63	24	12	217	71

CONCACAF Championship & Gold Cup history
First match	Costa Rica 6–0 Jamaica (24 March 1963; Santa Ana, El Salvador)
Biggest Win	Jamaica 5–0 Saint Kitts and Nevis (2 July 2023; Santa Clara, United States)
Biggest Defeat	Mexico 8–0 Jamaica (28 March 1963; Santa Ana, El Salvador)
Best Result	Runners-up (2015, 2017)
Worst Result	Group stage (1963, 1991, 2000, 2009, 2025)

=== CONCACAF Nations League ===
CONCACAF Nations League record
League phase											Final phase								
Season	Division	Group	Seed	Pld	W	D	L	GF	GA	P/R	Finals	Result	Pld	W	D	L	GF	GA	Squad
2019−20	B	C	—	6	5	1	0	21	1	▲	(United States) 2021	Ineligible							
2022–23	A	A	—	4	1	3	0	7	5	Same position	(United States) 2023	Did not qualify							
2023–24	A	B	6th	4	3	1	0	10	5	Same position	(United States) 2024	Third place	4	2	0	2	6	7	Squad
2024–25	A	B	6th	4	2	2	0	4	1	Same position	(United States) 2025	Quarter-finals	2	1	0	1	2	5	—
Total	—	—	—	18	11	7	0	42	12	—	Total	Third place	6	3	0	3	8	12	—

CONCACAF Nations League history
First match	Jamaica 6–0 Antigua and Barbuda (6 September 2019; Montego Bay, Jamaica)
Biggest Win	Jamaica 6–0 Antigua and Barbuda (6 September 2019; Montego Bay, Jamaica); Aruba 0–6 Jamaica (15 October 2019; Willemstad, Curaçao)
Biggest Defeat	United States 3–1 (a.e.t.) Jamaica (21 March 2024; Arlington, United States); United States 4–2 Jamaica (18 November 2024; St. Louis, United States)
Best Result	Third place (2023–24)
Worst Result	13th place (2019–20)

=== Copa América ===
Jamaica was invited to the Copa América for the first time in 2015, finishing last among Argentina, Uruguay, and Paraguay. The following year, the team competed in the Copa América Centenario as winners of the 2014 Caribbean Cup, again finishing last in the group stage following a 3–0 loss to Uruguay. Jamaica qualified for the 2024 Copa América by reaching the 2024 CONCACAF Nations League Finals, but again exited in the group stage with no points.

Copa América record
Year	Result	Position	Pld	W	D	L	GF	GA	Squad
(Chile) 2015	Group stage	12th	3	0	0	3	0	3	Squad
(United States) 2016	Group stage	15th	3	0	0	3	0	6	Squad
(United States) 2024	Group stage	15th	3	0	0	3	1	7	Squad
Total	Group stage	Invitation (3)	9	0	0	9	1	16	—

=== Caribbean Cup ===
CFU Championship / Caribbean Cup record									Qualification record					
Year	Result	Pld	W	D	L	GF	GA	Squad	Pld	W	D	L	GF	GA
(Trinidad and Tobago) 1978	Did not qualify								2	0	0	2	1	3
(Suriname) 1979	Did not qualify								4	2	0	2	4	9
(Puerto Rico) 1981	Did not qualify								2	1	0	1	2	4
(French Guiana) 1983	Did not participate								Did not participate					
(Barbados) 1985	Did not participate								Did not participate					
(Martinique) 1988	Did not participate								Did not participate					
(Barbados) 1989	Did not qualify								4	0	2	2	2	6
(Trinidad and Tobago) 1990	Abandoned (Note: Play was suspended when Jamaat al Muslimeen attempted a coup d'état of the government of Trinidad and Tobago. The tournament was abandoned altogether after Tropical storm Arthur forced the cancellation of the final round of games. Trinidad and Tobago were to meet Martinique in the final.)	2	0	2	0	0	0	Squad	3	2	1	0	4	0
(Jamaica) 1991	Champions	4	4	0	0	13	2	Squad	Qualified as host					
(Trinidad and Tobago) 1992	Runners-up	5	3	1	1	4	3	Squad	Qualified as champions					
(Jamaica) 1993	Runners-up	5	4	1	0	17	4	Squad	Qualified as host					
(Trinidad and Tobago) 1994	Did not qualify								3	2	0	1	18	5
(Cayman Islands) (Jamaica) 1995	Group stage	3	2	0	1	4	3	Squad	Qualified as host					
(Trinidad and Tobago) 1996	Group stage	3	1	0	2	5	5	Squad	2	1	0	1	2	2
(Antigua and Barbuda) (Saint Kitts and Nevis) 1997	Third place	4	2	2	0	8	3	Squad	3	3	0	0	10	2
(Jamaica) (Trinidad and Tobago) 1998	Champions	5	5	0	0	12	4	Squad	Qualified as host					
(Trinidad and Tobago) 1999	Third place	4	2	0	2	7	5	Squad	Qualified as champions					
(Trinidad and Tobago) 2001	Group stage	3	2	0	1	4	3	Squad	Qualified automatically					
(Barbados) 2005	Champions	3	3	0	0	4	1	Squad	7	5	2	0	34	4
(Trinidad and Tobago) 2007	Did not qualify								3	2	0	1	7	2
(Jamaica) 2008	Champions	5	4	1	0	11	2	Squad	Qualified as host					
(Martinique) 2010	Champions	5	4	1	0	12	3	Squad	Qualified as champions					
(Antigua and Barbuda) 2012	Group stage	3	0	1	2	1	3	Squad	Qualified as champions					
(Jamaica) 2014	Champions	4	2	2	0	6	1	Squad	Qualified as host					
(Martinique) 2017	Runners-up	2	0	1	1	2	3	Squad	2	1	1	0	5	2
Total	6 Titles	60	38	12	10	110	45	—	35	19	6	10	89	39

== Head-to-head record ==
As of 5 October 2026, the national team has played in 564 matches, with 251 wins, 142 draws, and 238 losses since their first international match in 1925. In total, the team has scored 798 goals and conceded 794 goals. Jamaica's highest winning margin is twelve goals, which has been achieved on two occasions: against the British Virgin Islands in 1994 (12–0) and against Saint Martin in 2004 (12–0). Their longest winning streak is seven wins and their unbeaten record is 22 consecutive official matches.

Positive Record Neutral Record Negative Record

Opponents	Pld	W	D	L	GF	GA
Antigua and Barbuda	13	10	2	1	29	5
Argentina	4	0	0	4	1	12
Aruba	3	3	0	0	14	0
Australia	2	0	0	2	1	7
Bahamas	2	2	0	0	13	0
Barbados	14	10	2	2	24	10
Belize	1	0	1	0	0	0
Bermuda	9	6	3	0	19	6
Bolivia	3	1	1	1	3	6
Bonaire	1	1	0	0	6	0
Brazil	3	0	1	2	0	2
British Virgin Islands	2	2	0	0	13	0
Bulgaria	1	0	1	0	0	0
Cameroon	1	0	1	0	1	1
Canada	27	8	7	12	24	35
Cayman Islands	11	9	1	1	35	8
Chile	2	1	0	1	2	2
China	3	0	0	3	0	5
Colombia	5	1	0	4	1	7
Costa Rica	31	4	12	15	19	56
Croatia	1	0	0	1	1	3
Cuba	28	10	7	11	34	31
Curaçao	6	2	2	2	6	5
Dominica	1	1	0	0	3	2
Dominican Republic	1	1	0	0	1	0
Ecuador	5	0	2	3	2	7
Egypt	1	0	1	0	2	2
El Salvador	34	11	8	5	28	16
England	1	0	0	1	0	6
France	1	0	0	1	0	8
French Guiana	1	0	1	0	0	0
Ghana	2	0	0	2	2	6
Grenada	12	9	2	1	33	9
Guadeloupe	6	5	1	0	12	3
Guatemala	21	13	4	4	37	21
Guyana	6	5	1	0	20	3
Haiti	33	19	4	10	50	36
Honduras	32	12	7	13	36	50
India	3	2	1	0	5	0
Indonesia	1	0	0	1	1	2
Iran	2	0	0	2	1	9
Jordan	1	0	0	1	1	2
Japan	4	1	1	2	3	7
Malaysia	1	1	0	0	2	0
Martinique	5	2	3	0	4	2
Mexico	33	5	5	23	20	76
Morocco	2	0	0	2	0	4
New Caledonia	1	1	0	0	1	0
New Zealand	2	2	0	0	5	3
Nicaragua	3	2	0	1	6	3
Nigeria	8	1	4	3	7	12
North Macedonia	1	0	0	1	1	2
Norway	2	0	1	1	1	7
Panama	22	4	7	11	17	31
Paraguay	6	2	0	4	7	11
Peru	5	0	1	4	4	12
Puerto Rico	7	7	0	0	17	3
Qatar	2	0	1	1	2	3
Republic of Ireland	1	0	0	1	0	1
Saint Kitts and Nevis	11	9	2	0	28	7
Saint Lucia	10	9	1	0	30	6
Saint Martin	1	1	0	0	12	0
Saint Vincent and the Grenadines	11	8	2	1	26	8
Saudi Arabia	6	2	1	3	6	14
Serbia	2	0	1	1	2	3
Sint Maarten	2	2	0	0	6	2
South Africa	6	0	5	1	5	7
South Korea	4	0	2	2	3	8
Suriname	9	6	1	2	15	11
Sweden	2	0	1	1	1	2
Switzerland	2	0	0	2	0	3
Trinidad and Tobago	77	33	16	28	94	92
Uruguay	5	1	0	4	2	9
United States	35	3	10	22	24	61
U.S. Virgin Islands	1	1	0	0	11	1
Venezuela	8	2	1	5	4	12
Vietnam	1	0	0	1	0	3
Wales	1	0	1	0	0	0
Zambia	4	1	1	2	6	7

== Honours ==
=== Continental ===
- CONCACAF Gold Cup
  - (silver) Runners-up (2): 2015, 2017
  - (bronze) Third place (1): 1993
- CONCACAF Nations League
  - (bronze) Third place (1): 2023–24

=== Subcontinental / Regional ===
- Caribbean Cup
  - (gold) Champions (6): 1991, 1998, 2005, 2008, 2010, 2014
  - (silver) Runners-up (3): 1992, 1993, 2017
  - (bronze) Third place (2): 1997, 1999

=== Summary ===
Honours in competitions directly organized or recognized by FIFA or an affiliated confederation.

Competition	1st place, gold medalist(s)	2nd place, silver medalist(s)	3rd place, bronze medalist(s)	Total
CONCACAF Gold Cup	0	2	1	3
CONCACAF Nations League	0	0	1	1
Total	0	2	2	4

== See also ==
- Football in Jamaica
- Jamaican Football Federation
- Jamaica national under-23 football team
- Jamaica national under-20 football team
- Jamaica national under-17 football team
- Jamaican Premier League
- Jamaican football league system
