= Romai Sports =

Sportswear brand

Romai Sportswear Ltd
- Company type: Private Limited
- Industry: Sportswear
- Founded: July 18, 2012 in United Arab Emirates
- Founder: Khamis Al-Rumaithy
- Headquarters: Abu Dhabi, United Arab Emirates
- Website: www.romaiworld.com

Romai Sports is an Emirati design and manufacturing company of sportswear and accessories that are worn by players from various football teams. The sports firm is the only establishment in the United Arab Emirates which engages in such activities.

== History ==
Romai was founded by Khamis Al-Rumaithy on July 12, 2012, becoming the first company in the UAE to engage in the design and sales of sportswear for athletes.

== Sponsorships ==
In the same year, Romai sponsored and designed sportswear for Al Wasl Sports Club that spanned from 2012 to 2013, after which followed other teams:

=== Football ===
==== National teams ====
- Bahrain 2014–2019
- Jamaica 2015–2018
- Palestine 2018
- Senegal 2017–2018

==== Club teams ====
- (Bahrain) Bahraini Premier League — All clubs 2017–2019
- (United Arab Emirates) Al Wasl Sports Club 2012–2013
- (United Arab Emirates) Al Wahda Sports Club 2013–2015
- (Saudi Arabia) Al Fateh 2016–2018
- (Saudi Arabia) Al Shabab 2015–2018

=== Futsal ===
==== National teams ====
- (United Arab Emirates) UAE 2014–2016

==== Club teams ====
- (United Arab Emirates) Al-Dhafra

=== Handball ===
==== Club teams ====
- (United Arab Emirates) Emirates
