= Jorge Penna =

Brazilian football manager

Managerial career
- Years: Team
- 1962: Jamaica
- 1963–1964: Nigeria
- 1965: Jamaica
- 1972–1973: Nigeria

Jorge Penna was a Brazilian football manager.

== Coaching career ==
The first mention of Penna's foray into international football management came when he was appointed manager of the Jamaica national football team in 1962. He appears to have had a brief stint as manager of the Nigeria national football team between 1963 and 1964, before a return to Jamaica for 1966 FIFA World Cup qualification games in 1965.

After another short stint as manager of Nigeria, it is not clear what happened to Penna, though it is believed he since died.
