= Dexter Lembikisa =

Jamaican footballer (born 2003)

Personal information
- Full name: Dexter Joeng Woo Lembikisa
- Date of birth: 4 November 2003 (age 23)
- Place of birth: Lambeth, England
- Height: 1.80 m (5 ft 11 in)
- Position: Right-back

Youth career
- 2016–2022: Wolverhampton Wanderers

Senior career*
Years	Team	Apps	(Gls)
2022–2026	Wolverhampton Wanderers	1	(0)
2023–2024	→ Rotherham United (loan)	25	(1)
2024	→ Heart of Midlothian (loan)	14	(2)
2024	→ Yverdon-Sport (loan)	3	(0)
2025	→ Barnsley (loan)	12	(0)
2025–2026	→ Lincoln City (loan)	3	(0)

International career^{‡}
2023–	Jamaica	35	(1)
Medal record
Men's football
Representing Jamaica
CONCACAF Nations League
Bronze medal – third place	2024 United States	Team
- * Club domestic league appearances and goals as of 21:57, 29 December 2025 (UTC) ‡ National team caps and goals as of 08:23, 19 November 2025 (UTC)

Dexter Joeng Woo Lembikisa (born 4 November 2003) is a professional footballer who plays as a right-back. Born in England, he plays for the Jamaica national team.

== Club career ==
=== Wolverhampton Wanderers ===
Lembikisa joined Wolverhampton Wanderers' youth academy at the age of 13, and worked his way up their youth categories. On 10 November 2021, he signed his first professional contract with Wolves and promoted to their reserves in 2021. He started training with their senior team in the summer of 2022. He made his professional debut with Wolves as a late substitute with Wolves in a 1–0 EFL Cup tie with Leeds United on 9 November 2022.

On 6 June 2026, Wolves announced that Lembikisa would leave the club upon the expiry of his contract.

==== Loans ====
On 27 July Lembikisa joined EFL Championship side Rotherham United on loan. He scored his first senior goal in the 2–1 win against Norwich City on 2 September 2023.

Lembikisa was then loaned to Scottish Premiership club Hearts in January 2024. He made his debut for Hearts on 23 January 2024, playing 90 minutes and scoring in a 3–2 win over Dundee

In September 2024, Lembikisa joined Swiss Super League club Yverdon-Sport on a season-long loan deal. On 1 January 2025, the loan was terminated early.

In February 2025, he moved to League One club Barnsley on loan until the end of the season.

On 1 September 2025, he joined League One side Lincoln City on loan until January 2026. He made his debut in the EFL Trophy against Manchester United U21. He returned having played five times in all competitions.

== International career ==
Lembikisa was born in England to a Congolese father and Jamaican mother. He was called up to represent the Jamaica U20s for the 2022 CONCACAF U-20 Championship.

He debuted for the senior Jamaica national team in a friendly 1–0 loss to Trinidad and Tobago on 11 March 2023. He later was included in Jamaica's selection for the 2023 CONCACAF Gold Cup. He appeared in all three group games and supplied an assist for the final goal in a 4–1 win against Trinidad and Tobago, helping the team advance to the knockout stage.

== Career statistics ==
=== Club ===
As of 29 December 2025

Appearances and goals by club, season and competition
Club	Season	League			National Cup		League Cup		Other		Total	
Club	Season	Division	Apps	Goals	Apps	Goals	Apps	Goals	Apps	Goals	Apps	Goals
Wolverhampton Wanderers U21	2021–22	—			—		—		2 (Note: Appearances in EFL Trophy)	0	2	0
Wolverhampton Wanderers U21	2022–23	—			—		—		4	0	4	0
Wolverhampton Wanderers U21	Total	—			—		—		6	0	6	0
Wolverhampton Wanderers	2022–23	Premier League	1	0	2	0	1	0	—		4	0
Wolverhampton Wanderers	Total		1	0	2	0	1	0	0	0	4	0
Rotherham United (loan)	2023–24	Championship	25	1	1	0	1	0	—		27	1
Hearts (loan)	2023–24	Scottish Premiership	14	2	4	0	—		—		18	2
Yverdon-Sport (loan)	2024–25	Swiss Super League	3	0	0	0	—		—		3	0
Barnsley (loan)	2024–25	League One	12	0	0	0	0	0	0	0	12	0
Lincoln City (loan)	2025–26	League One	3	0	0	0	0	0	2	0	5	0
Career total			57	3	7	0	2	0	8	0	74	3

=== International ===
As of 19 November 2025

Appearances and goals by national team and year
National team	Year	Apps	Goals
Jamaica	2023	14	0
Jamaica	2024	8	1
Jamaica	2025	12	0
Total		34	1

Scores and results list Jamaica's goal tally first.

List of international goals scored by Dexter Lembikisa
No.	Date	Venue	Opponent	Score	Result	Competition
1.	24 March 2024	AT&T Stadium, Arlington, United States	Panama	1–0	1–0	2024 CONCACAF Nations League Finals
