= Kyle Ming =

Jamaican association football player (born 1999)

Personal information
- Full name: Kyle Allan Ming
- Date of birth: 25 January 1999 (age 27)
- Height: 1.75 m (5 ft 9 in)
- Position: Defender

Team information
- Current team: Mount Pleasant

Senior career*
| Years | Team | Apps | (Gls) |
| 2018–2024 | Cavalier | 141 | (6) |
| 2024– | Mount Pleasant | 71 | (3) |

International career^{‡}
| 2023– | Jamaica | 9 | (0) |
- * Club domestic league appearances and goals as of 00:15 (UTC) 27 September 2026 ‡ National team caps and goals as of 5 October 2026

Kyle Allan Ming (born 25 January 1999) is a Jamaican professional footballer who plays as a defender for Jamaican club Mount Pleasant and the Jamaica national team.

== Early life ==
He is from Westmoreland Parish. He attended Ascot High School first then was transferred to Bridgeport High School both in Portmore, Jamaica.

== Club career ==
A right back, or right wing back, he took over the captaincy of Jamaican Premier League club Cavalier in 2021. That season, he won the Jamaican Premier League title, the first for the club since 1981. He was sent off on the opening day of the 2022 season, reckebing a straight red card for fighting against Arnett Gardens.

He captained Cavalier as they reached the 2023 Jamaican Premier League final with a win over Harbor View. They subsequently lost the final 2–1 against Mount Pleasant in June 2023. He played in the Premier League final again the following season, as this time Cavalier won on penalties against the same opponent.

It proved to be his final game for the club as he joined Mount Pleasant shortly afterwards under manager Theodore Whitmore. In 2024, he played for the club in the 2024 CONCACAF Caribbean Cup. He was a member of the Mount Pleasant team which set a league record of eleven consecutive wins in January 2025.

== International career ==
In 2023, he was called-up for the Jamaica national football team for their friendly matches by manager Heimir Hallgrímsson. He made his senior Jamaica debut in a 0–0 draw against Guatemala national football team on 12 November 2023. He continues with the Jamaican national team, and was named in the squad by subsequent manager Steve McLaren in January 2025.

== Career statistics ==
=== International ===
As of match played 5 October 2026

Appearances and goals by national team and year
| National team | Year | Apps | Goals |
|---|---|---|---|
| Jamaica | 2023 | 1 | 0 |
| Jamaica | 2024 | 1 | 0 |
| Jamaica | 2025 | 3 | 0 |
| Jamaica | 2026 | 4 | 0 |
| Total | | 9 | 0 |
