= Jahmali Waite =

Jamaican footballer (born 1998)

Personal information
- Date of birth: 24 December 1998 (age 27)
- Place of birth: Kingston, Jamaica
- Height: 1.85 m (6 ft 1 in)
- Position: Goalkeeper

Team information
- Current team: Tampa Bay Rowdies
- Number: 1

Youth career
- 2016–2017: Philadelphia Union

College career
Years	Team	Apps	(Gls)
2017–2019	Fairleigh Dickinson Knights	40	(0)
2020–2021	UConn Huskies	23	(0)

Senior career*
Years	Team	Apps	(Gls)
2017	Bethlehem Steel	0	(0)
2019	Reading United	8	(0)
2021	Ocean City Nor'easters	9	(0)
2022–2023	Pittsburgh Riverhounds	47	(0)
2024–2025	El Paso Locomotive	48	(0)
2026–	Tampa Bay Rowdies	25	(0)

International career^{‡}
2015	Jamaica U17		
2022–	Jamaica	17	(0)
Medal record
Men's football
Representing Jamaica
CONCACAF Nations League
Bronze medal – third place	2024 United States	Team
- * Club domestic league appearances and goals as of 17:03, 8 November 2026 (UTC) ‡ National team caps and goals as of 21:02, 26 April 2026 (UTC)

Jahmali Waite (born 24 December 1998) is a professional footballer who plays as a goalkeeper for Tampa Bay Rowdies in the USL Championship. Born in Kingston, Jamaica, he represents the Jamaica national team.

== Club career ==
=== Youth career ===
Waite played as part of the Philadelphia Union academy, also appearing on the bench for the club's USL Championship side during their 2017 season. He was persuaded to move to the club by fellow Jamaican Andre Blake.

=== College and amateur career ===
In 2017, Waite attended Fairleigh Dickinson University to play college soccer. In three seasons with the Knights, Waite made 40 appearances. He was named to the Northeast Conference All-Rookie team as a freshman in 2017 and a First Team All-NEC selection in 2018. In his final year with the Knights, he was named the NEC Tournament MVP and helped guide Fairleigh Dickinson to the 2019 NCAA Tournament.

2020 saw Waite transfer to the University of Connecticut, where he made a further 23 appearances.

During his time at college, Waite also played in the USL League Two. He made eight regular season appearances and one playoff appearance for Reading United AC during their 2019 season. In 2021, Waite appeared for Ocean City Nor'easters, playing nine times in the league and twice in the playoffs.

Following college, Waite went undrafted in the 2022 MLS SuperDraft, but joined Major League Soccer club Chicago Fire for their preseason training camp. However, he did not sign for the club.

=== Professional career ===
==== Pittsburgh Riverhounds ====
On 25 March 2022, Waite signed his first professional contract, joining USL Championship club Pittsburgh Riverhounds. He made his debut for the club in the Lamar Hunt U.S. Open Cup on 5 April 2022. In 2023, Jahmali Waite picked up a clean sheet against New England Revolution, leading the side to a 1–0 win. Following this, Jahmali Waite was man of the match against the Columbus Crew, saving three shots and conceding zero in the 1-0 that allowed the Hounds to make it to Quarterfinals of the U.S. Open Cup for the first time since 2001. Jahmali Waite was man of the match against the Tampa Bay Rowdies in the 1–0 win, saving the only shot on goal.

=== El Paso Locomotive ===
On 4 January 2024, Waite signed with El Paso Locomotive for their 2024 USL Championship season.

== International career ==
Waite has represented Jamaica at under-17 level. Waite made his senior international debut on November 10 versus Cameroon. Waite made multiple appearances in friendlies for the Jamaica national team, and earned a call up to Jamaica's 2023 CONCACAF Gold Cup squad. He started the 2023 Gold Cup game against Saint Kitts and Nevis, making two saves in the 5–0 win before coming off in the 82nd minute.

== Career statistics ==
=== International ===
As of match played 5 September 2025

Appearances and goals by national team and year
National team	Year	Apps	Goals
Jamaica	2022	1	0
Jamaica	2023	7	0
Jamaica	2024	5	0
Jamaica	2025	4	0
Total		17	0
