= Michael Sambataro =

Dominican footballer (born 2002)

Personal information
- Full name: Michael Matías Sambataro Oviedo
- Date of birth: 4 December 2002 (age 23)
- Place of birth: Buenos Aires, Argentina
- Position: Defender

Youth career
- 2012–2014: River Plate
- 2014–2018: San Lorenzo
- 2018–2023: Huracán

Senior career*
Years	Team	Apps	(Gls)
2023–2024	Güemes	18	(1)
2024	Cibao	31	(1)
2025	C.S.D. Liniers	8	(0)

International career^{‡}
2023–	Dominican Republic U23	4	(0)
2023–	Dominican Republic	15	(1)
- * Club domestic league appearances and goals as of 7 October 2025 ‡ National team caps and goals as of 9 September 2025

Michael Matías Sambataro Oviedo (born 4 December 2002) is a professional footballer who plays as a defender. Born in Argentina, he plays for the Dominican Republic national team.

== Club career ==
Sambataro is a youth product of River Plate, San Lorenzo and Huracán. In January 2023, he moved to Güemes where he began his professional career in the Primera Nacional.

== Club statistics ==
Club	Division	Season	League			National cups			International cups			Total		
Club	Division	Season	Caps	Goals	Assists	Caps	Goals	Assists	Caps	Goals	Assists	Caps	Goals	Assists
Güemes; Argentina	Primera Nacional	2023	18	1	1	0	0	0	0	0	0	18	1	1
Cibao; Dominican Republic	LDF	2024	35	0	0	0	0	0	4	0	0	39	1	0
Liniers; Argentina	Primera B Metropolitana	2025	8	0	0	0	0	0	0	0	0	8	0	0
Total career			61	2	1	0	0	0	4	0	0	65	2	1

== International career ==
Sambataro was born in Argentina to an Argentine father and Dominican mother. He was called up to the Dominican Republic national team in June 2023.
