= Shaquan Davis (footballer) =

Jamaican footballer (born 2000)

Personal information
- Date of birth: November 11, 2000 (age 25)
- Place of birth: Kingston, Jamaica
- Height: 1.75 m (5 ft 9 in)
- Position: Goalkeeper

Team information
- Current team: Mount Pleasant
- Number: 40

Senior career*
Years	Team	Apps	(Gls)
2020–2022	Arnett Gardens	6	(0)
2022–	Mount Pleasant	50	(0)
2021	→ Vere United (loan)	9	(0)

International career^{‡}
2024–	Jamaica	3	(0)
- * Club domestic league appearances and goals as of 1 April 2025 ‡ National team caps and goals as of 30 May 2025

Shaquan Davis (born 11 November 2000) is a Jamaican footballer who plays as a goalkeeper for Mount Pleasant and the Jamaica national team.

== Club career ==
Davis began his career with Arnett Gardens, where he made his professional debut. In 2022, he joined league fellow Mount Pleasant. He was part of the team's 2022–23 Jamaica Premier League winning campaign, being the starter goalkeeper.

== International career ==
On 3 March 2024, Davis made his international debut Jamaica national team, starting in the friendly game against Trinidad and Tobago.

In June 2024, Davis was included in Jamaica's 26-men squad for the 2024 Copa América.

== Career statistics ==
=== International ===
As of match played 30 May 2025

Appearances and goals by national team and year
National team	Year	Apps	Goals
Jamaica	2024	1	0
Jamaica	2025	2	0
Total		3	0

== Honours ==
Mount Pleasant

- Jamaica Premier League: 2022–23
