= 2025 CONCACAF Gold Cup Group C =

Football competition

Group C of the 2025 CONCACAF Gold Cup consisted of Guadeloupe, Guatemala, Jamaica, and Panama. Teams in this group played from June 16 to 24, 2025. The top two teams, Panama and Guatemala, advanced to the quarter-finals, while the other two teams were eliminated.

== Standings ==
Pos	Team	Pld	W	D	L	GF	GA	GD	Pts	Qualification
1	Panama	3	3	0	0	10	3	+7	9	Advance to knockout stage
2	Guatemala	3	2	0	1	4	3	+1	6	Advance to knockout stage
3	Jamaica	3	1	0	2	3	6	−3	3	
4	Guadeloupe	3	0	0	3	5	10	−5	0	

Source: CONCACAF
Rules for classification: Tiebreakers

In the quarter-finals:

- The winners of Group C, Panama, advanced to play the runners-up of Group B, Honduras.
- The runners-up of Group C, Guatemala, advanced to play the winners of Group B, Canada.

== Matches ==
=== Panama vs Guadeloupe ===
June 16, 2025
19:00 (16:00 UTC−7)

Panama	5–2	Guadeloupe
Martínez 6'; Díaz 13', 17'; Guerrero 22' (pen.); T. Rodríguez 90+2'	Report	Leborgne 29'; David 71' (pen.)

Dignity Health Sports Park, Carson
Attendance: 18,262
Referee: Keylor Herrera (Costa Rica)

Panama	Guadeloupe

GK	22	Orlando Mosquera
RB	23	Michael Amir Murillo
CB	4	Fidel Escobar
CB	16	Andrés Andrade	(yellow card) 76'
LB	26	Jorge Gutiérrez		(substituted off) 67'
CM	14	Carlos Harvey
CM	20	Aníbal Godoy (c)		(substituted off) 67'
RW	7	José Luis Rodríguez		(substituted off) 88'
AM	6	Cristian Martínez		(substituted off) 77'
LW	10	Ismael Díaz
CF	9	Eduardo Guerrero		(substituted off) 67'
Substitutions:
DF	3	José Córdoba		(substituted on) 67'
DF	15	Eric Davis		(substituted on) 67'
FW	24	Tomás Rodríguez		(substituted on) 67'
MF	8	Víctor Griffith		(substituted on) 77'
MF	21	César Yanis		(substituted on) 88'
Manager:
(Spain) Thomas Christiansen

GK	16	Brice Cognard
RB	26	Yvann Maçon	(substituted off) 46'
CB	15	Dimitri Cavaré
CB	5	Nathanaël Saintini
LB	4	Jérôme Roussillon	(substituted off) 81'
CM	7	Noah Cadiou
CM	6	Anthony Baron (c)
RW	8	Ange-Freddy Plumain	(substituted off) 46'
AM	18	Jordan Leborgne
LW	10	Matthias Phaëton	(substituted off) 62'
CF	9	Thierry Ambrose	(substituted off) 62'
Substitutions:
DF	2	Zoran Moco	(substituted on) 46'
MF	25	Steve Solvet	(substituted on) 46'
FW	13	Florian David	(substituted on) 62'
FW	20	Raphaël Mirval	(substituted on) 62'
MF	12	Junior Senneville	(substituted on) 81'
Manager:
Jocelyn Angloma

Player of the Match:
Ismael Díaz (Panama)

Assistant referees:
William Chow (Costa Rica)
Víctor Ramírez (Costa Rica)
Fourth official:
Adonis Carrasco (Dominican Republic)
Video assistant referee:
Benjamín Pineda (Costa Rica)
Assistant video assistant referee:
Edvin Jurisevic (United States)

=== Jamaica vs Guatemala ===
June 16, 2025
22:00 (19:00 UTC−7)

Jamaica	0–1	Guatemala
	Report	Santis 32'

Dignity Health Sports Park, Carson
Attendance: 18,262
Referee: Juan Gabriel Calderón (Costa Rica)

Jamaica	Guatemala

GK	1	Andre Blake (c)
RB	15	Joel Latibeaudiere
CB	6	Richard King		(substituted off) 46'
CB	5	Ethan Pinnock
LB	3	Amari'i Bell
DM	17	Damion Lowe	(yellow card) 19'	(substituted off) 85'
CM	18	Jon Russell		(substituted off) 85'
CM	11	Demarai Gray		(substituted off) 66'
RF	7	Leon Bailey
CF	16	Warner Brown		(substituted off) 67'
LF	20	Renaldo Cephas
Substitutions:
DF	2	Dexter Lembikisa		(substituted on) 46'
MF	8	Kasey Palmer		(substituted on) 66'
FW	10	Rumarn Burrell		(substituted on) 67'
FW	9	Kaheim Dixon		(substituted on) 85'
FW	26	Michail Antonio		(substituted on) 85'
Manager:
(England) Steve McClaren

GK	1	Nicholas Hagen
RB	7	Aaron Herrera
CB	4	José Carlos Pinto (c)
CB	3	Nicolás Samayoa
LB	16	José Morales
DM	22	Jonathan Franco
RM	18	Óscar Santis	(substituted off) 77'
CM	13	Stheven Robles	(substituted off) 77'
CM	25	Kevin Ramírez	(substituted off) 66'
LM	11	Rudy Muñoz	(substituted off) 84'
CF	14	Darwin Lom	(substituted off) 66'
Substitutions:
MF	10	Pedro Altán	(substituted on) 66'
FW	9	Rubio Rubin	(substituted on) 66'
MF	8	Rodrigo Saravia	(substituted on) 77'
FW	20	Olger Escobar	(substituted on) 77'
FW	23	Elmer Cardoza	(substituted on) 84'
Manager:
(Mexico) Luis Fernando Tena

Player of the Match:
Óscar Santis (Guatemala)

Assistant referees:
Juan Carlos Mora (Costa Rica)
William Arrieta (Costa Rica)
Fourth official:
Reon Radix (Grenada)
Video assistant referee:
Jesús Montero (Costa Rica)
Assistant video assistant referee:
Luis Enrique Santander (Mexico)

=== Jamaica vs Guadeloupe ===
June 20, 2025
19:45 (16:45 UTC−7)

Jamaica	2–1	Guadeloupe
Bailey 41'; Russell 45+4'	Report	Ambrose 32'

PayPal Park, San Jose
Attendance: 2,405
Referee: Kwinsi Williams (Trinidad and Tobago)

Jamaica	Guadeloupe

GK	1	Andre Blake (c)
RB	2	Dexter Lembikisa
CB	6	Richard King
CB	5	Ethan Pinnock
LB	3	Amari'i Bell
DM	15	Joel Latibeaudiere
RM	7	Leon Bailey	(yellow card) 77'	(substituted off) 85'
CM	18	Jon Russell	(yellow card) 43'
CM	12	Dwayne Atkinson		(substituted off) 46'
LM	11	Demarai Gray		(substituted off) 46'
CF	16	Warner Brown	(yellow card) 47'	(substituted off) 81'
Substitutions:
DF	4	Karoy Anderson	(yellow card) 54'	(substituted on) 46'
FW	20	Renaldo Cephas		(substituted on) 46'
FW	26	Michail Antonio		(substituted on) 81'
FW	9	Kaheim Dixon		(substituted on) 85'
Manager:
(England) Steve McClaren

GK	16	Brice Cognard
RB	2	Zoran Moco
CB	15	Dimitri Cavaré
CB	5	Nathanaël Saintini
LB	4	Jérôme Roussillon		(substituted off) 59'
DM	25	Steve Solvet		(substituted off) 86'
CM	7	Noah Cadiou
CM	6	Anthony Baron (c)
RF	18	Jordan Leborgne		(substituted off) 59'
CF	9	Thierry Ambrose	(yellow card) 11'	(substituted off) 82'
LF	10	Matthias Phaëton	(yellow card) 60'	(substituted off) 81'
Substitutions:
DF	26	Yvann Maçon		(substituted on) 59'
FW	13	Florian David		(substituted on) 59'
FW	20	Raphaël Mirval		(substituted on) 81'
MF	11	Taïryk Arconte		(substituted on) 82'
MF	8	Ange-Freddy Plumain	(yellow card) 90+3'	(substituted on) 86'
Manager:
Jocelyn Angloma

Player of the Match:
Leon Bailey (Jamaica)

Assistant referees:
Ainsley Rochard (Trinidad and Tobago)
Zachari Zeegelaar (Suriname)
Fourth official:
Katja Koroleva (United States)
Video assistant referee:
Allen Chapman (United States)
Assistant video assistant referee:
Ben Whitty (Cayman Islands)

=== Guatemala vs Panama ===
June 20, 2025
22:00 (21:00 UTC−5)

Guatemala	0–1	Panama
	Report	T. Rodríguez 19'

Q2 Stadium, Austin
Attendance: 12,829
Referee: Adonai Escobedo (Mexico)

Guatemala	Panama

GK	1	Nicholas Hagen
RB	7	Aaron Herrera
CB	4	José Carlos Pinto (c)
CB	3	Nicolás Samayoa
LB	16	José Morales	(yellow card) 46'
CM	22	Jonathan Franco		(substituted off) 76'
CM	25	Kevin Ramírez		(substituted off) 46'
RW	18	Óscar Santis	(yellow card) 39'	(substituted off) 62'
AM	13	Stheven Robles	(yellow card) 38'	(substituted off) 68'
LW	11	Rudy Muñoz
CF	14	Darwin Lom		(substituted off) 62'
Substitutions:
MF	10	Pedro Altán	(yellow card) 72'	(substituted on) 46'
FW	20	Olger Escobar		(substituted on) 62'
FW	19	Arquímides Ordóñez		(substituted on) 62'
MF	5	José Rosales		(substituted on) 68'
MF	8	Rodrigo Saravia		(substituted on) 76'
Manager:
(Mexico) Luis Fernando Tena

GK	22	Orlando Mosquera
RB	23	Michael Amir Murillo
CB	4	Fidel Escobar
CB	16	Andrés Andrade
LB	26	Jorge Gutiérrez
CM	20	Aníbal Godoy (c)
CM	14	Carlos Harvey	(substituted off) 87'
RW	7	José Luis Rodríguez
AM	6	Cristian Martínez	(substituted off) 68'
LW	10	Ismael Díaz	(substituted off) 82'
CF	24	Tomás Rodríguez	(substituted off) 67'
Substitutions:
FW	9	Eduardo Guerrero	(substituted on) 67'
MF	21	César Yanis	(substituted on) 68'
MF	8	Víctor Griffith	(substituted on) 82'
DF	5	Edgardo Fariña	(substituted on) 87'
Manager:
(Spain) Thomas Christiansen

Player of the Match:
Tomás Rodríguez (Panama)

Assistant referees:
Michel Espinoza (Mexico)
Leonardo Castillo (Mexico)
Fourth official:
Reon Radix (Grenada)
Video assistant referee:
Óscar Macías (Mexico)
Assistant video assistant referee:
Shirley Perelló (Honduras)

=== Panama vs Jamaica ===
June 24, 2025
19:00 (18:00 UTC−5)

Panama	4–1	Jamaica
Díaz 4', 17', 45' (pen.); T. Rodríguez 89'	Report	Bell 27'

Q2 Stadium, Austin
Attendance: 3,283
Referee: Selvin Brown (Honduras)

Panama	Jamaica

GK	22	Orlando Mosquera
RB	2	César Blackman
CB	4	Fidel Escobar
CB	3	José Córdoba	(yellow card) 69'
LB	26	Jorge Gutiérrez
CM	20	Aníbal Godoy (c)		(substituted off) 72'
CM	8	Víctor Griffith		(substituted off) 84'
RW	11	Azarias Londoño		(substituted off) 46'
AM	6	Cristian Martínez		(substituted off) 46'
LW	10	Ismael Díaz		(substituted off) 66'
CF	24	Tomás Rodríguez
Substitutions:
MF	14	Carlos Harvey		(substituted on) 46'
MF	7	José Luis Rodríguez		(substituted on) 46'
MF	21	César Yanis	(yellow card) 85'	(substituted on) 66'
DF	5	Edgardo Fariña		(substituted on) 72'
MF	25	Edward Cedeño		(substituted on) 84'
Manager:
(Spain) Thomas Christiansen

GK	1	Andre Blake (c)
RB	2	Dexter Lembikisa
CB	6	Richard King		(substituted off) 46'
CB	5	Ethan Pinnock
LB	3	Amari'i Bell
DM	15	Joel Latibeaudiere	(yellow card) 61'
RM	7	Leon Bailey		(substituted off) 72'
CM	18	Jon Russell		(substituted off) 64'
CM	8	Kasey Palmer
LM	11	Demarai Gray		(substituted off) 64'
CF	16	Warner Brown		(substituted off) 46'
Substitutions:
FW	20	Renaldo Cephas		(substituted on) 46'
DF	22	Greg Leigh		(substituted on) 46'
FW	9	Kaheim Dixon		(substituted on) 64'
FW	25	Bobby De Cordova-Reid	(yellow card) 79'	(substituted on) 64'
FW	26	Michail Antonio		(substituted on) 72'
Manager:
(England) Steve McClaren

Player of the Match:
Ismael Díaz (Panama)

Assistant referees:
Gerson Orellana (Honduras)
Roney Salinas (Honduras)
Fourth official:
Adonis Carrasco (Dominican Republic)
Video assistant referee:
Jesús Montero (Costa Rica)
Assistant video assistant referee:
Shirley Perelló (Honduras)

=== Guadeloupe vs Guatemala ===
June 24, 2025
19:00 (18:00 UTC−5)

Guadeloupe	2–3	Guatemala
Plumain 50' (pen.); Phaëton 78'	Report	Pinto 13' (pen.); Escobar 29'; Rubin 70'

Shell Energy Stadium, Houston
Attendance: 19,417
Referee: Marco Ortíz (Mexico)

Guadeloupe	Guatemala

GK	1	Rubens Adélaïde
RB	26	Yvann Maçon		(substituted off) 71'
CB	19	Méddy Lina
CB	5	Nathanaël Saintini
LB	12	Junior Senneville
CM	3	Alexandre Arenate
CM	6	Anthony Baron (c)	(yellow card) 12'	(substituted off) 68'
RW	17	Kenny Mixtur		(substituted off) 58'
AM	8	Ange-Freddy Plumain	(yellow card) 45+5'	(substituted off) 71'
LW	14	Kilian Bevis		(substituted off) 59'
CF	11	Taïryk Arconte
Substitutions:
FW	9	Thierry Ambrose		(substituted on) 58'
MF	10	Matthias Phaëton		(substituted on) 59'
MF	18	Jordan Leborgne		(substituted on) 68'
DF	2	Zoran Moco		(substituted on) 71'
FW	22	Vikash Tillé		(substituted on) 71'
Manager:
Jocelyn Angloma

GK	1	Nicholas Hagen
RB	7	Aaron Herrera	(yellow card) 82'
CB	4	José Carlos Pinto (c)
CB	3	Nicolás Samayoa
LB	2	José Ardón		(substituted off) 62'
DM	5	José Rosales		(substituted off) 74'
CM	17	Óscar Castellanos		(substituted off) 35'
CM	11	Rudy Muñoz	(yellow card) 41'
RF	20	Olger Escobar		(substituted off) 74'
CF	9	Rubio Rubin
LF	6	Erick Lemus		(substituted off) 62'
Substitutions:
DF	13	Stheven Robles		(substituted on) 35'
DF	16	José Morales		(substituted on) 62'
FW	18	Óscar Santis		(substituted on) 62'
FW	19	Arquímides Ordóñez		(substituted on) 74'
MF	8	Rodrigo Saravia		(substituted on) 74'
Manager:
(Mexico) Luis Fernando Tena

Player of the Match:
Rubio Rubin (Guatemala)

Assistant referees:
Michel Morales (Mexico)
Jorge Sánchez (Mexico)
Fourth official:
José Torres (Puerto Rico)
Video assistant referee:
Benjamín Pineda (Costa Rica)
Assistant video assistant referee:
Luis Enrique Santander (Mexico)

== Discipline ==
Fair play points would have been used as tiebreakers if the overall and head-to-head records of teams were tied. These were calculated based on yellow and red cards received in all group matches as follows:

- first yellow card: −1 point;
- indirect red card (second yellow card): −3 points;
- direct red card: −4 points;
- yellow card and direct red card: −5 points;

Only one of the above deductions was applied to a player in a single match.

Team	Match 1				Match 2				Match 3				Points
Team	Booked	(yellow card) (yellow-red card)	Sent off (straight red)	(yellow card) (red card)	Booked	(yellow card) (yellow-red card)	Sent off (straight red)	(yellow card) (red card)	Booked	(yellow card) (yellow-red card)	Sent off (straight red)	(yellow card) (red card)	Points
Panama	1								2				–3
Guadeloupe					3				2				–5
Guatemala					4				2				–6
Jamaica	1				4				2				–7
