= 2025 CONCACAF Gold Cup knockout stage =

Stage of the football championship competition

The knockout stage of the 2025 CONCACAF Gold Cup was the second and final stage of the competition, following the group stage. Played from June 28 to July 6, the knockout stage ended with the final, held at NRG Stadium in Houston, Texas. The top two teams from each group advanced to the knockout stage to compete in a single-elimination tournament. There were seven matches in the knockout stage.

== Format ==
The knockout stage of the 2025 CONCACAF Gold Cup was contested between the eight teams that qualified from the group stage. Matches in the knockout stage were played to a finish. If the score of a match was level at the end of 90 minutes of playing time, it was decided by a penalty shoot-out, except in the final, in which 30 minutes of extra time would be played first before proceeding to penalties if needed. All times listed are local in Eastern Time Zone (UTC−4).

== Qualified teams ==
The top two placed teams from each of the four groups qualified for the knockout stage.

Group	Winners	Runners-up
A	Mexico	Costa Rica
B	Canada	Honduras
C	Panama	Guatemala
D	United States	Saudi Arabia

== Bracket ==
The tournament bracket is shown below, with bold denoting the winners of each match.

Quarterfinals
June 29 – Minneapolis
**United States (p)**	**2 (4)**
Costa Rica	2 (3)
June 29 – Minneapolis
Canada	1 (5)
**Guatemala (p)**	**1 (6)**
June 28 – Glendale
**Mexico**	**2**
Saudi Arabia	0
June 28 – Glendale
Panama	1 (4)
**Honduras (p)**	**1 (5)**

Semifinals
July 2 – St. Louis
**United States**	**2**
Guatemala	1
July 2 – Santa Clara
**Mexico**	**1**
Honduras	0

Final
July 6 – Houston
United States	1
**Mexico**	**2**

== Quarterfinals ==
=== Panama vs Honduras ===
June 28, 2025
19:15 (16:15 UTC−7)

Panama	1–1	Honduras
Díaz 45+1' (pen.)	Report	Lozano 82'
Penalties
Escobar (penalty scored); Díaz (penalty scored); Godoy (penalty missed); Harvey (penalty scored); Davis (penalty scored); Guerrero (penalty missed)	4–5	(penalty scored) Palma; (penalty scored) Arriaga; (penalty scored) Rosales; (penalty scored) Maldonado; (penalty missed) Lozano; (penalty scored) Pineda

State Farm Stadium, Glendale
Attendance: 45,255
Referee: Katia García (Mexico)

**Panama**	**Honduras**

GK	22	Orlando Mosquera
RB	23	Michael Amir Murillo
CB	4	Fidel Escobar
CB	16	Andrés Andrade		(substituted off) 90+3'
LB	26	Jorge Gutiérrez	(yellow card) 81'	(substituted off) 90+3'
CM	20	Aníbal Godoy (c)
CM	14	Carlos Harvey
RW	7	José Luis Rodríguez
AM	6	Cristian Martínez		(substituted off) 74'
LW	10	Ismael Díaz	(yellow card) 58'
CF	24	Tomás Rodríguez		(substituted off) 74'
Substitutions:
FW	9	Eduardo Guerrero		(substituted on) 74'
MF	8	Víctor Griffith		(substituted on) 74'
DF	15	Eric Davis		(substituted on) 90+3'
DF	3	José Córdoba		(substituted on) 90+3'
Manager:
(Spain) Thomas Christiansen

GK	1	Edrick Menjívar
RB	26	Luís Crisanto	(yellow card) 49'
CB	2	Denil Maldonado (c)
CB	3	Julián Martínez	(yellow card) 45+4'
LB	8	Joseph Rosales
DM	20	Deiby Flores
RM	16	Edwin Rodríguez		(substituted off) 46'
CM	5	Kervin Arriaga
CM	23	Jorge Álvarez		(substituted off) 65'
LM	12	Romell Quioto		(substituted off) 66'
CF	11	Jorge Benguché		(substituted off) 46'
Substitutions:
FW	9	Anthony Lozano		(substituted on) 46'
FW	18	Dixon Ramírez		(substituted on) 46'
MF	19	Carlos Pineda		(substituted on) 65'
MF	17	Luis Palma		(substituted on) 66'
Manager:
(Colombia) Reinaldo Rueda

Player of the Match:
Edrick Menjívar (Honduras)

Assistant referees:
Sandra Ramírez (Mexico)
Karen Díaz (Mexico)
Fourth official:
Bryan López (Guatemala)
Video assistant referee:
Óscar Mejía (Mexico)
Assistant video assistant referee:
Yasith Monge (Costa Rica)

=== Mexico vs Saudi Arabia ===
June 28, 2025
22:15 (19:15 UTC−7)

Mexico	2–0	Saudi Arabia
Vega 49'; Madu 81' (o.g.)	Report

State Farm Stadium, Glendale
Attendance: 45,255
Referee: Lukasz Szpala (United States)

**Mexico**	**Saudi Arabia**

GK	1	Luis Malagón
RB	22	Julián Araujo
CB	4	Edson Álvarez (c)
CB	5	Johan Vásquez
LB	23	Jesús Gallardo	(yellow card) 45+8'	(substituted off) 60'
DM	6	Érik Lira
CM	14	Marcel Ruiz
CM	7	Gilberto Mora		(substituted off) 73'
RF	25	Roberto Alvarado		(substituted off) 85'
CF	9	Raúl Jiménez		(substituted off) 60'
LF	10	Alexis Vega		(substituted off) 73'
Substitutions:
DF	26	Mateo Chávez		(substituted on) 60'
FW	11	Santiago Giménez		(substituted on) 60'
MF	8	Carlos Rodríguez		(substituted on) 73'
FW	16	Julián Quiñones		(substituted on) 73'
MF	17	Orbelín Pineda		(substituted on) 85'
Manager:
Javier Aguirre

GK	1	Nawaf Al-Aqidi
RB	26	Ali Majrashi	(yellow card) 45+8'	(substituted off) 69'
CB	4	Abdulelah Al-Amri		(substituted off) 53'
CB	5	Abdullah Madu
LB	13	Nawaf Boushal
RM	12	Saud Abdulhamid
CM	6	Ali Al-Hassan		(substituted off) 88'
CM	16	Ziyad Al-Johani	(yellow card) 78'
LM	24	Abdulrahman Al-Aboud		(substituted off) 69'
CF	9	Firas Al-Buraikan
CF	11	Saleh Al-Shehri (c)		(substituted off) 69'
Substitutions:
MF	17	Mohammed Bakor		(substituted on) 53'
MF	19	Turki Al-Ammar		(substituted on) 69'
FW	20	Abdullah Al-Salem		(substituted on) 69'
MF	8	Marwan Al-Sahafi		(substituted on) 69'
MF	10	Faisal Al-Ghamdi		(substituted on) 88'
Manager:
(France) Hervé Renard

Player of the Match:
Alexis Vega (Mexico)

Assistant referees:
Cory Richardson (United States)
Nick Uranga (United States)
Fourth official:
Pierre-Luc Lauzière (Canada)
Video assistant referee:
Edvin Jurisevic (United States)
Assistant video assistant referee:
Chris Penso (United States)

=== Canada vs Guatemala ===
June 29, 2025
16:00 (15:00 UTC−5)

Canada	1–1	Guatemala
J. David 30' (pen.)	Report	Rubin 69'
Penalties
P. David (penalty scored); Jebbison (penalty scored); Cornelius (penalty scored); Choinière (penalty scored); Larin (penalty missed); Saliba (penalty scored); De Fougerolles (penalty missed)	5–6	(penalty scored) Santis; (penalty scored) Samayoa; (penalty scored) Herrera; (penalty scored) Lom; (penalty missed) Pinto; (penalty scored) Altán; (penalty scored) Morales

U.S. Bank Stadium, Minneapolis
Attendance: 32,289
Referee: Keylor Herrera (Costa Rica)

**Canada**	**Guatemala**

GK	1	Dayne St. Clair
RB	2	Alistair Johnston
CB	15	Luc de Fougerolles
CB	13	Derek Cornelius
LB	22	Richie Laryea
RM	17	Tajon Buchanan		(substituted off) 58'
CM	23	Niko Sigur		(substituted off) 71'
CM	6	Mathieu Choinière
LM	14	Jacob Shaffelburg	(yellow card) 40' (yellow-red card) 45+4'
CF	10	Jonathan David (c)		(substituted off) 90+1'
CF	12	Tani Oluwaseyi		(substituted off) 71'
Substitutions:
FW	11	Daniel Jebbison		(substituted on) 58'
MF	19	Nathan Saliba		(substituted on) 71'
FW	9	Cyle Larin		(substituted on) 71'
FW	24	Promise David		(substituted on) 90+1'
Manager:
(United States) Jesse Marsch

GK	12	Kenderson Navarro
RB	7	Aaron Herrera
CB	4	José Carlos Pinto (c)
CB	3	Nicolás Samayoa
LB	16	José Morales
DM	5	José Rosales		(substituted off) 82'
CM	13	Stheven Robles
CM	11	Rudy Muñoz		(substituted off) 71'
RF	20	Olger Escobar		(substituted off) 71'
CF	9	Rubio Rubin	(yellow card) 60'	(substituted off) 77'
LF	18	Óscar Santis
Substitutions:
FW	10	Pedro Altán		(substituted on) 71'
FW	19	Arquímides Ordóñez		(substituted on) 71'
FW	14	Darwin Lom		(substituted on) 77'
MF	8	Rodrigo Saravia		(substituted on) 82'
Manager:
(Mexico) Luis Fernando Tena

Player of the Match:
Óscar Santis (Guatemala)

Assistant referees:
William Chow (Costa Rica)
Víctor Ramírez (Costa Rica)
Fourth official:
Adonai Escobedo (Mexico)
Video assistant referee:
Daneon Parchment (Jamaica)
Assistant video assistant referee:
Ben Whitty (Cayman Islands)

=== United States vs Costa Rica ===
June 29, 2025
19:00 (18:00 UTC−5)

United States	2–2	Costa Rica
Luna 43'; Arfsten 47'	Report	Calvo 12' (pen.); Martínez 71'
Penalties
Adams (penalty scored); Tillman (penalty scored); Berhalter (penalty missed); Freeman (penalty scored); Tolkin (penalty missed); Downs (penalty scored)	4–3	(penalty scored) Martínez; (penalty missed) J. Vargas; (penalty scored) Van der Putten; (penalty scored) Brenes; (penalty missed) Calvo; (penalty missed) Rojas

U.S. Bank Stadium, Minneapolis
Attendance: 32,289
Referee: Walter López (Guatemala)

**United States**	**Costa Rica**

GK	25	Matt Freese
RB	16	Alex Freeman
CB	3	Chris Richards
CB	13	Tim Ream (c)
LB	18	Maximilian Arfsten		(substituted off) 84'
CM	4	Tyler Adams
CM	14	Luca de la Torre		(substituted off) 78'
RW	8	Sebastian Berhalter
AM	17	Malik Tillman	(yellow card) 38'
LW	10	Diego Luna		(substituted off) 83'
CF	24	Patrick Agyemang		(substituted off) 90'
Substitutions:
FW	9	Damion Downs		(substituted on) 78'
MF	6	Jack McGlynn		(substituted on) 83'
DF	2	John Tolkin		(substituted on) 84'
FW	23	Brian White		(substituted on) 90'
Manager:
(Argentina) Mauricio Pochettino

GK	1	Keylor Navas (c)
RB	22	Carlos Mora		(substituted off) 88'
CB	4	Juan Pablo Vargas	(yellow card) 35'
CB	6	Alexis Gamboa
LB	15	Francisco Calvo
CM	14	Orlando Galo
CM	16	Alejandro Bran		(substituted off) 74'
RW	19	Kenneth Vargas	(yellow card) 38'	(substituted off) 58'
AM	10	Brandon Aguilera		(substituted off) 58'
LW	20	Josimar Alcócer	(yellow card) 68'	(substituted off) 88'
CF	12	Alonso Martínez
Substitutions:
FW	7	Andy Rojas		(substituted on) 58'
MF	13	Jefferson Brenes		(substituted on) 58'
MF	25	Cristopher Núñez		(substituted on) 74'
DF	2	Santiago van der Putten		(substituted on) 88'
DF	26	Kenay Myrie		(substituted on) 88'
Manager:
(Mexico) Miguel Herrera

Player of the Match:
Maximilian Arfsten (United States)

Assistant referees:
Keytzel Corrales (Nicaragua)
Raymundo Feliz (Dominican Republic)
Fourth official:
Kwinsi Williams (Trinidad and Tobago)
Video assistant referee:
Diego Ojer (Guatemala)
Assistant video assistant referee:
Dilia Bradley (Guatemala)

== Semifinals ==
=== United States vs Guatemala ===
July 2, 2025
19:00 (18:00 UTC−5)

United States	2–1	Guatemala
Luna 4', 15'	Report	Escobar 80'

Energizer Park, St. Louis
Attendance: 22,423
Referee: Oshane Nation (Jamaica)

**United States**	**Guatemala**

GK	25	Matt Freese	(yellow card) 77'
RB	16	Alex Freeman
CB	3	Chris Richards	(yellow card) 45+1'
CB	13	Tim Ream (c)
LB	18	Maximilian Arfsten		(substituted off) 85'
CM	4	Tyler Adams		(substituted off) 77'
CM	14	Luca de la Torre	(yellow card) 55'	(substituted off) 58'
RW	8	Sebastian Berhalter
AM	17	Malik Tillman
LW	10	Diego Luna	(yellow card) 51'	(substituted off) 77'
CF	24	Patrick Agyemang		(substituted off) 85'
Substitutions:
MF	11	Brenden Aaronson		(substituted on) 58'
DF	2	John Tolkin		(substituted on) 77'
MF	6	Jack McGlynn		(substituted on) 77'
FW	9	Damion Downs		(substituted on) 85'
DF	5	Walker Zimmerman		(substituted on) 85'
Manager:
(Argentina) Mauricio Pochettino

GK	12	Kenderson Navarro
RB	7	Aaron Herrera
CB	4	José Carlos Pinto (c)
CB	3	Nicolás Samayoa
LB	16	José Morales
RM	18	Óscar Santis	(yellow card) 90+4'
CM	13	Stheven Robles	(yellow card) 49'	(substituted off) 65'
CM	5	José Rosales		(substituted off) 65'
LM	11	Rudy Muñoz		(substituted off) 65'
CF	9	Rubio Rubin		(substituted off) 70'
CF	10	Pedro Altán		(substituted off) 70'
Substitutions:
FW	20	Olger Escobar		(substituted on) 65'
MF	22	Jonathan Franco		(substituted on) 65'
MF	17	Óscar Castellanos		(substituted on) 65'
FW	19	Arquímides Ordóñez		(substituted on) 70'
FW	14	Darwin Lom		(substituted on) 70'
Manager:
(Mexico) Luis Fernando Tena

Player of the Match:
Diego Luna (United States)

Assistant referees:
Caleb Wales (Trinidad and Tobago)
Ojay Duhaney (Jamaica)
Fourth official:
Ismael Cornejo (El Salvador)
Video assistant referee:
Daneon Parchment (Jamaica)
Assistant video assistant referee:
Ben Whitty (Cayman Islands)

=== Mexico vs Honduras ===
July 2, 2025
22:00 (19:00 UTC−7)

Mexico	1–0	Honduras
Jiménez 50'	Report

Levi's Stadium, Santa Clara
Attendance: 70,975
Referee: Juan Gabriel Calderón (Costa Rica)

**Mexico**	**Honduras**

GK	1	Luis Malagón
RB	22	Julián Araujo	(yellow card) 89'
CB	3	César Montes
CB	5	Johan Vásquez
LB	26	Mateo Chávez	(yellow card) 47'	(substituted off) 71'
DM	4	Edson Álvarez (c)
CM	7	Gilberto Mora		(substituted off) 77'
CM	14	Marcel Ruiz		(substituted off) 90+2'
RF	25	Roberto Alvarado		(substituted off) 71'
CF	9	Raúl Jiménez		(substituted off) 90+1'
LF	10	Alexis Vega
Substitutions:
MF	19	Jesús Orozco	(yellow card) 83'	(substituted on) 71'
FW	21	César Huerta		(substituted on) 71'
FW	11	Santiago Giménez		(substituted on) 77'
MF	17	Orbelín Pineda		(substituted on) 90+1'
MF	6	Érik Lira	(yellow card) 90+6'	(substituted on) 90+2'
Other disciplinary actions:
GK	13	Guillermo Ochoa	(yellow card) 13'
Manager:
Javier Aguirre

GK	1	Edrick Menjívar
RB	26	Luís Crisanto	(yellow card) 24'
CB	2	Denil Maldonado (c)
CB	3	Julián Martínez
LB	8	Joseph Rosales
RM	18	Dixon Ramírez
CM	5	Kervin Arriaga	(yellow card) 76'
CM	20	Deiby Flores		(substituted off) 89'
LM	12	Romell Quioto		(substituted off) 71'
CF	23	Jorge Álvarez		(substituted off) 84'
CF	9	Anthony Lozano	(yellow card) 36'	(substituted off) 71'
Substitutions:
FW	21	Yustin Arboleda	(yellow card) 72'	(substituted on) 71'
MF	17	Luis Palma		(substituted on) 71'
MF	19	Carlos Pineda		(substituted on) 84'
MF	16	Edwin Rodríguez		(substituted on) 89'
Manager:
(Colombia) Reinaldo Rueda

Player of the Match:
Raúl Jiménez (Mexico)

Assistant referees:
Juan Carlos Mora (Costa Rica)
William Arrieta (Costa Rica)
Fourth official:
Pierre-Luc Lauzière (Canada)
Video assistant referee:
Allen Chapman (United States)
Assistant video assistant referee:
Diego Ojer (Guatemala)

== Final ==
July 6, 2025
19:00 (18:00 UTC−5)

United States	1–2	Mexico
Richards 4'	Report	Jiménez 27'; Ed. Álvarez 77'

NRG Stadium, Houston
Attendance: 70,925
Referee: Mario Escobar (Guatemala)

**United States**	**Mexico**

GK	25	Matt Freese
RB	16	Alex Freeman
CB	3	Chris Richards
CB	13	Tim Ream (c)
LB	18	Maximilian Arfsten		(substituted off) 86'
RM	8	Sebastian Berhalter
CM	4	Tyler Adams	(yellow card) 63'	(substituted off) 82'
CM	10	Diego Luna		(substituted off) 86'
LM	14	Luca de la Torre		(substituted off) 69'
CF	17	Malik Tillman
CF	24	Patrick Agyemang
Substitutions:
FW	9	Damion Downs		(substituted on) 69'
MF	6	Jack McGlynn		(substituted on) 82'
MF	11	Brenden Aaronson		(substituted on) 86'
DF	2	John Tolkin		(substituted on) 86'
Manager:
(Argentina) Mauricio Pochettino			(yellow card) 80'

GK	1	Luis Malagón
RB	2	Jorge Sánchez		(substituted off) 86'
CB	3	César Montes	(yellow card) 44'
CB	5	Johan Vásquez
LB	23	Jesús Gallardo
DM	4	Edson Álvarez (c)
CM	7	Gilberto Mora		(substituted off) 75'
CM	14	Marcel Ruiz
RF	25	Roberto Alvarado		(substituted off) 87'
CF	9	Raúl Jiménez	(yellow card) 85'	(substituted off) 86'
LF	10	Alexis Vega
Substitutions:
MF	17	Orbelín Pineda		(substituted on) 75'
FW	11	Santiago Giménez		(substituted on) 86'
DF	15	Israel Reyes		(substituted on) 86'
FW	21	César Huerta		(substituted on) 87'
Manager:
Javier Aguirre

Player of the Match:
Raúl Jiménez (Mexico)

Assistant referees:
Luis Ventura (Guatemala)
Humberto Panjoj (Guatemala)
Fourth official:
Walter López (Guatemala)
Reserve assistant referee:
Keytzel Corrales (Nicaragua)
Video assistant referee:
Benjamín Pineda (Costa Rica)
Assistant video assistant referee:
Yasith Monge (Costa Rica)
