= 2025 CONCACAF Gold Cup =

18th edition of the CONCACAF Gold Cup

Copa Oro CONCACAF 2025 (Spanish)
- This Is Ours; Spanish: Esto Es Nuestro

Tournament details
- Host countries: Canada; United States
- Dates: June 14 – July 6
- Teams: 16 (from 2 confederations)
- Venue: 14 (in 13 host cities)

Final positions
- Champions: Mexico (10th title)
- Runners-up: United States

Tournament statistics
- Matches played: 31
- Goals scored: 85 (2.74 per match)
- Attendance: 779,014 (25,129 per match)
- Top scorer(s): (Panama) Ismael Díaz (6 goals)
- Best player: (Mexico) Edson Álvarez
- Best young player: (Guatemala) Olger Escobar
- Best goalkeeper: (Mexico) Luis Malagón
- Fair play award: United States

The 2025 CONCACAF Gold Cup was the 18th edition of the CONCACAF Gold Cup, the biennial international men's soccer championship of the North, Central American and Caribbean region organized by CONCACAF. Canada and the United States hosted the tournament, which began on June 14, 2025.

The final was played on July 6, 2025 at NRG Stadium in Houston, where defending champions Mexico won its record-extending tenth title after defeating the United States 2–1.

The majority of the tournament's venues were in the Western United States to avoid scheduling conflicts with the 2025 FIFA Club World Cup, which was held at the same time primarily on the East Coast. Both tournaments served as trial preparation for the 2026 FIFA World Cup.

== Venues ==
Location of the host cities of the 2025 CONCACAF Gold Cup.

- Canada
- 1 Vancouver
- United States
- 2 Arlington
- 3 Austin
- 4 Carson
- 5 Glendale
- 6 Houston
- 7 Inglewood
- 8 Minneapolis
- 9 Paradise
- 10 San Diego
- 11 San Jose
- 12 Santa Clara
- 13 St. Louis

CONCACAF announced the 14 host venues for the 2025 Gold Cup on September 25, 2024. They included a mix of soccer-specific stadiums primarily occupied by Major League Soccer teams and larger gridiron football stadiums. BC Place in Vancouver was the sole venue outside of the United States. The venues were mostly limited to the Western United States to avoid conflicts with the 2025 FIFA Club World Cup happening mostly on the East Coast at the same time. CONCACAF announced that it had awarded the tournament final to NRG Stadium in Houston on October 30, 2024.

A double-dagger (‡) denotes an indoor stadium with a fixed or retractable roof with interior climate control.

List of host cities and stadiums
| City | Stadium | Capacity | Image |
|---|---|---|---|
| Arlington, Texas (Dallas/Fort Worth Area) | AT&T Stadium‡ | 80,000 | |
| Houston, Texas | NRG Stadium‡ | 72,220 | |
| Houston, Texas | Shell Energy Stadium | 22,039 | |
| Inglewood, California (Los Angeles Area) | SoFi Stadium | 70,240 | |
| Santa Clara, California (San Francisco Bay Area) | Levi's Stadium | 68,500 | |
| Minneapolis, Minnesota | U.S. Bank Stadium‡ | 66,860 | |
| Glendale, Arizona (Phoenix Area) | State Farm Stadium‡ | 63,400 | |
| Paradise, Nevada (Las Vegas Area) | Allegiant Stadium‡ | 61,000 | |
| Vancouver, British Columbia | BC Place‡ | 54,500 | |
| San Diego, California | Snapdragon Stadium | 35,000 | |
| Carson, California (Los Angeles Area) | Dignity Health Sports Park | 30,510 | |
| St. Louis, Missouri | Energizer Park | 22,500 | |
| Austin, Texas | Q2 Stadium | 20,730 | |
| San Jose, California (San Francisco Bay Area) | PayPal Park | 18,000 | |

== Teams ==
=== Qualification ===
In February 2023, CONCACAF announced that the 2024–25 CONCACAF Nations League would serve as qualification for the 2025 CONCACAF Gold Cup. All 41 member associations of CONCACAF participated in the Nations League, which was divided into three tiers. The four quarterfinal winners of Nations League A and the four group winners of Nations League B qualified directly for the Gold Cup. A Gold Cup preliminary round was held in March 2025, where seven additional teams qualified for the main tournament. A total of 16 teams competed in the main tournament.

On December 19, 2024, CONCACAF announced that Saudi Arabia would be invited as a guest team for the 2025 and 2027 tournaments. A potential expansion to 24 teams for the 2025 Gold Cup—with 16 CONCACAF teams and 8 invited guests—was previously reported by media outlets but did not materialize. It would have provided increased levels of competition for Mexico, Canada, and the United States, who would not play in the World Cup qualifying cycle due to their automatic qualification as hosts of the 2026 FIFA World Cup.

| Team | Qualification | Date of qualification | Gold Cup appearances (+ CONCACAF Championship) | Last appearance | Previous best Gold Cup performance (Note: Bold indicates that the corresponding team was hosting or co-hosting the event.) (+ CONCACAF Championship) | Rankings at start of event | |
| Team | Qualification | Date of qualification | Gold Cup appearances (+ CONCACAF Championship) | Last appearance | Previous best Gold Cup performance (+ CONCACAF Championship) | FIFA | CONCACAF |
|---|---|---|---|---|---|---|---|
| Haiti | CNL League B Group C winners | November 15, 2024 | 10th (17th) | 2023 | Semifinals (2019); Champions (**1973**) | 83 | 8 |
| El Salvador | CNL League B Group A winners | November 17, 2024 | 14th (20th) | 2023 | Quarterfinals (2002, 2003, 2011, 2013, 2017, 2021); Runners-up (**1963**, 1981) | 81 | 11 |
| Curaçao | CNL League B Group B winners | November 18, 2024 | 3rd (7th) | 2019 | Quarterfinals (2019); Third place (1963, 1969) | 90 | 15 |
| United States (co-hosts) | CNL League A quarter-final winners | November 18, 2024 | 18th (20th) | 2023 | Champions (**1991**, **2002**, **2005**, **2007**, **2013**, **2017**, **2021**); Runners-up (1989) | 16 | 4 |
| Panama | CNL League A quarter-final winners | November 18, 2024 | 12th (13th) | 2023 | Runners-up (2005, 2013, 2023) | 33 | 3 |
| Dominican Republic | CNL League B Group D winners | November 19, 2024 | 1st | N/A | Debut | 139 | 19 |
| Canada (co-hosts) | CNL League A quarter-final winners | November 19, 2024 | 17th (20th) | 2023 | Champions (2000); Champions (1985) | 30 | 2 |
| Mexico (title holders) | CNL League A quarter-final winners | November 19, 2024 | 18th (26th) | 2023 | Champions (**1993**, 1996, 1998, **2003**, 2009, 2011, 2015, 2019, 2023); Champions (1965, 1971, **1977**) | 17 | 1 |
| Saudi Arabia | Invited guests | December 19, 2024 | 1st | N/A | Debut | 58 | N/A |
| Trinidad and Tobago | Preliminary round winners | March 25, 2025 | 13th (19th) | 2023 | Semifinals (2000); Runners-up (1973) | 100 | 10 |
| Suriname | Preliminary round winners | March 25, 2025 | 2nd (4th) | 2021 | Group stage (2021); 6th place (1977) | 137 | 12 |
| Jamaica | Preliminary round winners | March 25, 2025 | 14th (16th) | 2023 | Runners-up (2015, 2017) | 63 | 6 |
| Guadeloupe | Preliminary round winners | March 25, 2025 | 6th | 2023 | Semifinals (2007) | N/A | 13 |
| Guatemala | Preliminary round winners | March 25, 2025 | 13th (21st) | 2023 | Fourth place (1996); Champions (1967) | 106 | 9 |
| Costa Rica | Preliminary round winners | March 25, 2025 | 17th (23rd) | 2023 | Runners-up (2002); Champions (1963, **1969**, 1989) | 54 | 5 |
| Honduras | Preliminary round winners | March 25, 2025 | 17th (23rd) | 2023 | Runners-up (1991); Champions (**1981**) | 75 | 7 |

=== Squads ===
Before submitting their final squad for the tournament, teams named a provisional squad of up to 60 players.

=== Draw ===
The final draw was held on April 10, 2025. The teams were split into four pots based on the CONCACAF Rankings of March 26, 2025. The four teams of Pot 1 were designated for the reigning Gold Cup champions, Mexico, and the three highest-ranked teams Canada, Panama, and the United States, with Mexico assigned to Group A, Canada assigned to Group B, Panama assigned to Group C, and the United States assigned to Group D, respectively. Pot 4 contained the three lowest ranked national teams and guests Saudi Arabia. Pots 5 to 8 contained the Group A, B, C, and D positions.

Pot 1
| Team | Pts | Rank |
|---|---|---|
| Mexico (A1) | 1,946 | 1 |
| Canada (B1) | 1,837 | 2 |
| Panama (C1) | 1,778 | 3 |
| United States (D1) | 1,712 | 4 |

Pot 2
| Team | Pts | Rank |
|---|---|---|
| Costa Rica | 1,668 | 5 |
| Jamaica | 1,552 | 6 |
| Honduras | 1,534 | 7 |
| Haiti | 1,481 | 8 |

Pot 3
| Team | Pts | Rank |
|---|---|---|
| Guatemala | 1,377 | 9 |
| Trinidad and Tobago | 1,360 | 10 |
| El Salvador | 1,243 | 11 |
| Suriname | 1,223 | 12 |

Pot 4
| Team | Pts | Rank |
|---|---|---|
| Guadeloupe | 1,222 | 13 |
| Curaçao | 1,130 | 15 |
| Dominican Republic | 1,050 | 19 |
| Saudi Arabia | N/A | |

== Match officials ==
Referees

- (Costa Rica) Juan Gabriel Calderón
- (Costa Rica) Keylor Herrera
- (Jamaica) Oshane Nation
- (Guatemala) Mario Escobar
- (Guatemala) Walter López
- (Honduras) Selvin Brown
- (Mexico) Adonai Escobedo
- (Mexico) Katia García
- (Mexico) Marco Ortíz
- (El Salvador) Ismael Cornejo
- (Trinidad and Tobago) Kwinsi Williams
- (United States) Joe Dickerson
- (United States) Lukasz Szpala

Support referees

- (Canada) Pierre-Luc Lauzière
- (Dominican Republic) Adonis Carrasco
- (Grenada) Reon Radix
- (Guatemala) Bryan López
- (Guatemala) Julio Luna
- (Jamaica) Steffon Dewar
- (Puerto Rico) José Torres
- (United States) Katja Koroleva

Assistant referees

- (Costa Rica) William Arrieta
- (Costa Rica) William Chow
- (Costa Rica) Juan Carlos Mora
- (Costa Rica) Víctor Ramírez
- (Dominican Republic) Raymundo Feliz
- (Honduras) Gerson Orellana
- (Honduras) Rony Salinas
- (Guatemala) Humberto Panjoj
- (Guatemala) Luis Ventura
- (Jamaica) Ojay Duhaney
- (Mexico) Leonardo Castillo
- (Mexico) Karen Díaz
- (Mexico) Michel Espinoza
- (Mexico) Michel Morales
- (Mexico) Sandra Ramírez
- (Mexico) Jorge Sánchez
- (Nicaragua) Keytzel Corrales
- (El Salvador) Geovany García
- (El Salvador) Juan Zumba
- (Suriname) Zachari Zeegelaar
- (Trinidad and Tobago) Ainsley Rochard
- (Trinidad and Tobago) Caleb Wales
- (United States) Cameron Blanchard
- (United States) Logan Brown
- (United States) Cory Richardson
- (United States) Nick Uranga

Video assistant referees

- (Cayman Islands) Ben Whitty
- (Costa Rica) Yasith Monge
- (Costa Rica) Jesús Montero
- (Costa Rica) Benjamín Pineda
- (Guatemala) Dilia Bradley
- (Guatemala) Diego Ojer
- (Honduras) Shirley Perelló
- (Jamaica) Daneon Parchment
- (Mexico) Óscar Macías
- (Mexico) Óscar Mejía
- (Mexico) Luis Enrique Santander
- (United States) Allen Chapman
- (United States) Edvin Jurisevic
- (United States) Chris Penso

== Schedule ==
The competition schedule was released on September 25, 2024.

| Round | Date(s) |
|---|---|
| Group stage | June 14–24 |
| Quarter-finals | June 28–29 |
| Semi-finals | July 2 |
| Final | July 6 |

== Opening ceremony ==
Dancers and performers from across Latin America headlined the opening ceremony, which took place at Inglewood's SoFi Stadium before the opening match between Mexico and the Dominican Republic. CONCACAF partnered with Balich Wonder Studio to produce the ceremony. The dancers performed to Luis Fonsi's "Tocando el Cielo", the tournament's official anthem, however the Puerto Rican singer was nowhere to be found. The organizers later stated that he did not perform due to "personal" reasons.

== Group stage ==
Tie-breaking criteria for group stage ranking
The ranking of teams in each group was determined by the points obtained in all group matches. If two or more teams were equal on points, the following criteria were used to determine the ranking:
1. Superior goal difference in all group matches;
2. Most goals scored in all group matches;

If, after having applied criteria a. to b., teams still had an equal ranking, criteria a. to b. were reapplied exclusively to the matches between the teams who are still level to determine their final rankings. If this procedure did not lead to a decision, criteria c. to h. applied.

4. Most points obtained in the group matches played between the teams concerned;
5. Superior goal difference in the group matches played between the teams concerned;
6. Most goals scored in the group matches played between the teams concerned;
7. Highest team conduct ("fair play") score in all group matches (only one deduction could be applied to a player or team coach/official in a single match):
  - Yellow card: −1 point;
  - Indirect red card (second yellow card): −3 points;
  - Direct red card: −4 points;
  - Yellow card and direct red card: −5 points;
8. Drawing of lots;

=== Group A ===
| Pos | Team | Pld | W | D | L | GF | GA | GD | Pts | Qualification |
|---|---|---|---|---|---|---|---|---|---|---|
| 1 | Mexico | 3 | 2 | 1 | 0 | 5 | 2 | +3 | 7 | Advance to knockout stage |
| 2 | Costa Rica | 3 | 2 | 1 | 0 | 6 | 4 | +2 | 7 | Advance to knockout stage |
| 3 | Dominican Republic | 3 | 0 | 1 | 2 | 3 | 5 | −2 | 1 | |
| 4 | Suriname | 3 | 0 | 1 | 2 | 3 | 6 | −3 | 1 | |

Source: CONCACAF
June 14, 2025
22:15 (19:15 UTC−7)

| Mexico | 3–2 | Dominican Republic |
|---|---|---|
| Ed. Álvarez 44'; Jiménez 47'; Montes 53' | Report | Peter 51'; Azcona 67' |

SoFi Stadium, Inglewood
Attendance: 54,309
Referee: Oshane Nation (Jamaica)
June 15, 2025
23:00 (20:00 UTC−7)

| Costa Rica | 4–3 | Suriname |
|---|---|---|
| Martínez 14'; Ugalde 19' (pen.), 90+13' (pen.); Alcócer 76' | Report | Kerk 34'; Margaret 59'; Pinas 64' (pen.) |

Snapdragon Stadium, San Diego
Attendance: 7,736
Referee: Joe Dickerson (United States)

June 18, 2025
19:06 (18:06 UTC−5)

| Costa Rica | 2–1 | Dominican Republic |
|---|---|---|
| Ugalde 44' (pen.); Alcócer 85' | Report | Urbáez 16' |

AT&T Stadium, Arlington
Attendance: 34,015
Referee: Lukasz Szpala (United States)
June 18, 2025
22:00 (21:00 UTC−5)

| Suriname | 0–2 | Mexico |
|---|---|---|
| | Report | Montes 57', 63' |

AT&T Stadium, Arlington
Attendance: 34,015
Referee: Selvin Brown (Honduras)

June 22, 2025
22:00 (19:00 UTC−7)

| Mexico | 0–0 | Costa Rica |
|---|---|---|
| | Report |

Allegiant Stadium, Paradise
Attendance: 35,000
Referee: Mario Escobar (Guatemala)
June 22, 2025
22:00 (21:00 UTC−5)

| Dominican Republic | 0–0 | Suriname |
|---|---|---|
| | Report |

AT&T Stadium, Arlington
Attendance: 20,918
Referee: Ismael Cornejo (El Salvador)

=== Group B ===
| Pos | Team | Pld | W | D | L | GF | GA | GD | Pts | Qualification |
|---|---|---|---|---|---|---|---|---|---|---|
| 1 | Canada (H) | 3 | 2 | 1 | 0 | 9 | 1 | +8 | 7 | Advance to knockout stage |
| 2 | Honduras | 3 | 2 | 0 | 1 | 4 | 7 | −3 | 6 | Advance to knockout stage |
| 3 | Curaçao | 3 | 0 | 2 | 1 | 2 | 3 | −1 | 2 | |
| 4 | El Salvador | 3 | 0 | 1 | 2 | 0 | 4 | −4 | 1 | |

Source: CONCACAF
(H) Co-host
June 17, 2025
20:15 (17:15 UTC−7)

| Curaçao | 0–0 | El Salvador |
|---|---|---|
| | Report |

PayPal Park, San Jose
Attendance: 13,042
Referee: Katia García (Mexico)
June 17, 2025
22:30 (19:30 UTC−7)

| Canada | 6–0 | Honduras |
|---|---|---|
| Sigur 27'; Oluwaseyi 45+2'; Buchanan 48', 65'; P. David 75'; Saliba 90' | Report |

BC Place, Vancouver
Attendance: 24,286
Referee: Mario Escobar (Guatemala)

June 21, 2025
19:00 (18:00 UTC−5)

| Curaçao | 1–1 | Canada |
|---|---|---|
| Antonisse 90+4' | Report | Saliba 9' |

Shell Energy Stadium, Houston
Attendance: 20,536
Referee: Juan Gabriel Calderón (Costa Rica)
June 21, 2025
22:00 (21:00 UTC−5)

| Honduras | 2–0 | El Salvador |
|---|---|---|
| Quioto 33'; Ramírez 90+5' | Report |

Shell Energy Stadium, Houston
Attendance: 20,536
Referee: Walter López (Guatemala)

June 24, 2025
22:00 (19:00 UTC−7)

| Honduras | 2–1 | Curaçao |
|---|---|---|
| Álvarez 32'; Palma 90+1' | Report | Menjívar 42' (o.g.) |

PayPal Park, San Jose
Attendance: 10,935
Referee: Oshane Nation (Jamaica)
June 24, 2025
22:00 (21:00 UTC−5)

| Canada | 2–0 | El Salvador |
|---|---|---|
| J. David 53'; Buchanan 56' | Report |

Shell Energy Stadium, Houston
Attendance: 19,417
Referee: Joe Dickerson (United States)

=== Group C ===
| Pos | Team | Pld | W | D | L | GF | GA | GD | Pts | Qualification |
|---|---|---|---|---|---|---|---|---|---|---|
| 1 | Panama | 3 | 3 | 0 | 0 | 10 | 3 | +7 | 9 | Advance to knockout stage |
| 2 | Guatemala | 3 | 2 | 0 | 1 | 4 | 3 | +1 | 6 | Advance to knockout stage |
| 3 | Jamaica | 3 | 1 | 0 | 2 | 3 | 6 | −3 | 3 | |
| 4 | Guadeloupe | 3 | 0 | 0 | 3 | 5 | 10 | −5 | 0 | |

Source: CONCACAF
June 16, 2025
19:00 (16:00 UTC−7)

| Panama | 5–2 | Guadeloupe |
|---|---|---|
| Martínez 6'; Díaz 13', 17'; Guerrero 22' (pen.); T. Rodríguez 90+2' | Report | Leborgne 29'; David 71' (pen.) |

Dignity Health Sports Park, Carson
Attendance: 18,262
Referee: Keylor Herrera (Costa Rica)
June 16, 2025
22:00 (19:00 UTC−7)

| Jamaica | 0–1 | Guatemala |
|---|---|---|
| | Report | Santis 32' |

Dignity Health Sports Park, Carson
Attendance: 18,262
Referee: Juan Gabriel Calderón (Costa Rica)

June 20, 2025
19:45 (16:45 UTC−7)

| Jamaica | 2–1 | Guadeloupe |
|---|---|---|
| Bailey 41'; Russell 45+4' | Report | Ambrose 32' |

PayPal Park, San Jose
Attendance: 2,405
Referee: Kwinsi Williams (Trinidad and Tobago)
June 20, 2025
22:00 (21:00 UTC−5)

| Guatemala | 0–1 | Panama |
|---|---|---|
| | Report | T. Rodríguez 19' |

Q2 Stadium, Austin
Attendance: 12,829
Referee: Adonai Escobedo (Mexico)

June 24, 2025
19:00 (18:00 UTC−5)

| Panama | 4–1 | Jamaica |
|---|---|---|
| Díaz 4', 17', 45' (pen.); T. Rodríguez 89' | Report | Bell 27' |

Q2 Stadium, Austin
Attendance: 3,283
Referee: Selvin Brown (Honduras)
June 24, 2025
19:00 (18:00 UTC−5)

| Guadeloupe | 2–3 | Guatemala |
|---|---|---|
| Plumain 50' (pen.); Phaëton 78' | Report | Pinto 13' (pen.); Escobar 29'; Rubin 70' |

Shell Energy Stadium, Houston
Attendance: 19,417
Referee: Marco Ortíz (Mexico)

=== Group D ===
| Pos | Team | Pld | W | D | L | GF | GA | GD | Pts | Qualification |
|---|---|---|---|---|---|---|---|---|---|---|
| 1 | United States (H) | 3 | 3 | 0 | 0 | 8 | 1 | +7 | 9 | Advance to knockout stage |
| 2 | Saudi Arabia | 3 | 1 | 1 | 1 | 2 | 2 | 0 | 4 | Advance to knockout stage |
| 3 | Trinidad and Tobago | 3 | 0 | 2 | 1 | 2 | 7 | −5 | 2 | |
| 4 | Haiti | 3 | 0 | 1 | 2 | 2 | 4 | −2 | 1 | |

Source: CONCACAF
Rules for classification: Tiebreakers
(H) Co-host
June 15, 2025
18:00 (15:00 UTC−7)

| United States | 5–0 | Trinidad and Tobago |
|---|---|---|
| Tillman 16', 41'; Agyemang 44'; B. Aaronson 82'; Wright 84' | Report |

PayPal Park, San Jose
Attendance: 12,610
Referee: Adonai Escobedo (Mexico)
June 15, 2025
20:15 (17:15 UTC−7)

| Haiti | 0–1 | Saudi Arabia |
|---|---|---|
| | Report | Al-Shehri 21' (pen.) |

Snapdragon Stadium, San Diego
Attendance: 7,736
Referee: Walter López (Guatemala)

June 19, 2025
18:45 (17:45 UTC−5)

| Trinidad and Tobago | 1–1 | Haiti |
|---|---|---|
| J. Garcia 68' | Report | Pierrot 49' |

Shell Energy Stadium, Houston
Attendance: 2,409
Referee: Ismael Cornejo (El Salvador)
June 19, 2025
21:15 (20:15 UTC−5)

| Saudi Arabia | 0–1 | United States |
|---|---|---|
| | Report | Richards 63' |

Q2 Stadium, Austin
Attendance: 11,727
Referee: Marco Ortíz (Mexico)

June 22, 2025
19:00 (16:00 UTC−7)

| Saudi Arabia | 1–1 | Trinidad and Tobago |
|---|---|---|
| Al-Buraikan 60' | Report | Sealy 10' |

Allegiant Stadium, Paradise
Attendance: 35,000
Referee: Keylor Herrera (Costa Rica)
June 22, 2025
19:00 (18:00 UTC−5)

| United States | 2–1 | Haiti |
|---|---|---|
| Tillman 10'; Agyemang 75' | Report | Deedson 19' |

AT&T Stadium, Arlington
Attendance: 20,918
Referee: Katia García (Mexico)

== Knockout stage ==
In the knockout stage, if the scores were equal when normal playing time expired, a penalty shoot-out was played to determine the winners, except in the final, in which 30 minutes of extra time would have been played first before proceeding to penalties if needed.

As with every tournament since 2005 (except for 2015), there was no third place playoff.

=== Bracket ===
Quarterfinals
June 29 – Minneapolis
United States (p) | 2 (4)
Costa Rica | 2 (3)
June 29 – Minneapolis
Canada | 1 (5)
Guatemala (p) | 1 (6)
June 28 – Glendale
Mexico | 2
Saudi Arabia | 0
June 28 – Glendale
Panama | 1 (4)
Honduras (p) | 1 (5)

Semifinals
July 2 – St. Louis
United States | 2
Guatemala | 1
July 2 – Santa Clara
Mexico | 1
Honduras | 0

Final
July 6 – Houston
United States | 1
Mexico | 2

=== Quarterfinals ===
June 28, 2025
19:15 (16:15 UTC−7)

| Panama | 1–1 | Honduras |
|---|---|---|
| Díaz 45+1' (pen.) | Report | Lozano 82' |
Penalties
| Escobar (penalty scored); Díaz (penalty scored); Godoy (penalty missed); Harvey (penalty scored); Davis (penalty scored); Guerrero (penalty missed) | 4–5 | (penalty scored) Palma; (penalty scored) Arriaga; (penalty scored) Rosales; (penalty scored) Maldonado; (penalty missed) Lozano; (penalty scored) Pineda |

State Farm Stadium, Glendale
Attendance: 45,255
Referee: Katia García (Mexico)

June 28, 2025
22:15 (19:15 UTC−7)

| Mexico | 2–0 | Saudi Arabia |
|---|---|---|
| Vega 49'; Madu 81' (o.g.) | Report |

State Farm Stadium, Glendale
Attendance: 45,255
Referee: Lukasz Szpala (United States)

June 29, 2025
16:00 (15:00 UTC−5)

| Canada | 1–1 | Guatemala |
|---|---|---|
| J. David 30' (pen.) | Report | Rubin 69' |
Penalties
| P. David (penalty scored); Jebbison (penalty scored); Cornelius (penalty scored); Choinière (penalty scored); Larin (penalty missed); Saliba (penalty scored); De Fougerolles (penalty missed) | 5–6 | (penalty scored) Santis; (penalty scored) Samayoa; (penalty scored) Herrera; (penalty scored) Lom; (penalty missed) Pinto; (penalty scored) Altán; (penalty scored) Morales |

U.S. Bank Stadium, Minneapolis
Attendance: 32,289
Referee: Keylor Herrera (Costa Rica)

June 29, 2025
19:00 (18:00 UTC−5)

| United States | 2–2 | Costa Rica |
|---|---|---|
| Luna 43'; Arfsten 47' | Report | Calvo 12' (pen.); Martínez 71' |
Penalties
| Adams (penalty scored); Tillman (penalty scored); Berhalter (penalty missed); Freeman (penalty scored); Tolkin (penalty missed); Downs (penalty scored) | 4–3 | (penalty scored) Martínez; (penalty missed) J. Vargas; (penalty scored) Van der Putten; (penalty scored) Brenes; (penalty missed) Calvo; (penalty missed) Rojas |

U.S. Bank Stadium, Minneapolis
Attendance: 32,289
Referee: Walter López (Guatemala)

=== Semifinals ===
July 2, 2025
19:00 (18:00 UTC−5)

| United States | 2–1 | Guatemala |
|---|---|---|
| Luna 4', 15' | Report | Escobar 80' |

Energizer Park, St. Louis
Attendance: 22,423
Referee: Oshane Nation (Jamaica)

July 2, 2025
22:00 (19:00 UTC−7)

| Mexico | 1–0 | Honduras |
|---|---|---|
| Jiménez 50' | Report |

Levi's Stadium, Santa Clara
Attendance: 70,975
Referee: Juan Gabriel Calderón (Costa Rica)

=== Final ===
July 6, 2025
19:00 (18:00 UTC−5)

| United States | 1–2 | Mexico |
|---|---|---|
| Richards 4' | Report | Jiménez 27'; Ed. Álvarez 77' |

NRG Stadium, Houston
Attendance: 70,925
Referee: Mario Escobar (Guatemala)

== Statistics ==
=== Goalscorers ===
There were 85 goals scored in 31 matches, for an average of 2.74 goals per match.

6 goals

- (Panama) Ismael Díaz

3 goals

- (Canada) Tajon Buchanan
- (Costa Rica) Manfred Ugalde
- (Mexico) Raúl Jiménez
- (Mexico) César Montes
- (Panama) Tomás Rodríguez
- (United States) Diego Luna
- (United States) Malik Tillman

2 goals

- (Canada) Jonathan David
- (Canada) Nathan Saliba
- (Costa Rica) Josimar Alcócer
- (Costa Rica) Alonso Martínez
- (Guatemala) Olger Escobar
- (Guatemala) Rubio Rubin
- (Mexico) Edson Álvarez
- (United States) Patrick Agyemang
- (United States) Chris Richards

1 goal

- (Canada) Promise David
- (Canada) Tani Oluwaseyi
- (Canada) Niko Sigur
- (Costa Rica) Francisco Calvo
- (Curaçao) Jeremy Antonisse
- (Dominican Republic) Edison Azcona
- (Dominican Republic) Peter González
- (Dominican Republic) Joao Urbáez
- (Guadeloupe) Thierry Ambrose
- (Guadeloupe) Florian David
- (Guadeloupe) Jordan Leborgne
- (Guadeloupe) Matthias Phaëton
- (Guadeloupe) Ange-Freddy Plumain
- (Guatemala) José Carlos Pinto
- (Guatemala) Óscar Santis
- (Haiti) Louicius Deedson
- (Haiti) Frantzdy Pierrot
- (Honduras) Jorge Álvarez
- (Honduras) Anthony Lozano
- (Honduras) Luis Palma
- (Honduras) Romell Quioto
- (Honduras) Dixon Ramírez
- (Jamaica) Leon Bailey
- (Jamaica) Amari'i Bell
- (Jamaica) Jon Russell
- (Mexico) Alexis Vega
- (Panama) Eduardo Guerrero
- (Panama) Cristian Martínez
- (Saudi Arabia) Firas Al-Buraikan
- (Saudi Arabia) Saleh Al-Shehri
- (Suriname) Gyrano Kerk
- (Suriname) Richonell Margaret
- (Suriname) Shaquille Pinas
- (Trinidad and Tobago) Justin Garcia
- (Trinidad and Tobago) Dante Sealy
- (United States) Brenden Aaronson
- (United States) Maximilian Arfsten
- (United States) Haji Wright

1 own goal

- (Honduras) Edrick Menjívar (against Curaçao)
- (Saudi Arabia) Abdullah Madu (against Mexico)

Source: CONCACAF

=== Awards ===
The following Gold Cup awards were given at the conclusion of the tournament: the Golden Ball (best overall player), Golden Boot (top scorer), Golden Glove (best goalkeeper), Young Player Award (best young player) and Fair Play Trophy (most disciplined team).

Golden Ball
(Mexico) Edson Álvarez
Golden Boot
(Panama) Ismael Díaz
6 goals, 0 assists
328 minutes played
Golden Glove
(Mexico) Luis Malagón
Young Player Award
(Guatemala) Olger Escobar
Fair Play Trophy
United States

Best XI

The following players were chosen as the tournament's best eleven.

| Goalkeeper | Defenders | Midfielders | Forwards |
|---|---|---|---|
| (Mexico) Luis Malagón | (Mexico) Johan Vásquez (Mexico) César Montes (United States) Chris Richards | (United States) Diego Luna (United States) Malik Tillman (Mexico) Edson Álvarez (Guatemala) Óscar Santis (Dominican Republic) Peter González | (Mexico) Raúl Jiménez (Panama) Ismael Díaz |

== Marketing ==
=== Broadcasting rights ===
==== Americas ====
| Territory | Broadcast | Ref. |
|---|---|---|
| Canada | OneSoccer | |
| Canada | TSN | |
| Canada | RDS | |
| Canada | Univision Canada | |
| United States | Fox Sports (English); Univision (Spanish) | |
| Mexico | Televisa | |
| Brazil | ESPN | |
| Caribbean | ESPN | |
| Central America | ESPN | |
| Guadeloupe | France TV | |
| South America | ESPN | |

==== International ====
| Territory | Broadcast | Ref. |
|---|---|---|
| Andorra | GOL PLAY | |
| Australia | ESPN | |
| Austria | Sportdigital | |
| Germany | Sportdigital | |
| Ghana | Sporty TV | |
| Hong Kong | MyTV Super | |
| Ireland | Premier Sports | |
| Israel | Charlton | |
| Kenya | Sporty TV | |
| Liechtenstein | Sportdigital | |
| Luxembourg | Sportdigital | |
| Malaysia | Astro SuperSport | |
| Netherlands | ESPN | |
| New Zealand | ESPN | |
| Nigeria | Sporty TV | |
| Pacific Islands | ESPN | |
| Papua New Guinea | ESPN | |
| Portugal | Sport TV | |
| Saudi Arabia | AlRiyadiyah | |
| Singapore | StarHub | |
| South Korea | Sky Sports | |
| Spain | GOL PLAY | |
| South Africa | Sporty TV | |
| Switzerland | Sportdigital | |
| Thailand | BG Sports | |
| Ukraine | Maincast | |
| United Kingdom | Premier Sports | |
| Unsold markets | YouTube & Concacaf GO | |

=== Sponsorship ===
The following were announced as global sponsors of the tournament:

- Saudi Aramco
- Caliente.mx
- Degree
- Macron
- Grupo Modelo
- Hilton
- Midea Group
- Molten
- Neau Water
- Public Investment Fund
- Remitly
- Riyadh Air
- Saudi Tourism Authority
- Shriners Hospitals for Children
- Toyota
- Valvoline
- Yerba Madre

== Symbols ==
=== Mascot ===
On March 10, 2025, CONCACAF announced that their new mascot Volar would be the mascot not only of the tournament, but also for the confederation.

=== Match ball ===
Vantaggio Gold 5000 by Molten served as the tournament's official match ball.

=== Music ===
"Tocando El Cielo" by Puerto Rican singer Luis Fonsi served as the official song of the tournament.
