= Kenderson Navarro =

Guatemalan footballer (born 2002)

Personal information
- Date of birth: 25 February 2002 (age 24)
- Place of birth: Santa Rosa, Guatemala
- Height: 6 ft 3 in (1.91 m)
- Position: Goalkeeper

Team information
- Current team: Municipal
- Number: 12

Senior career*
Years	Team	Apps	(Gls)
2019–	Municipal	94	(0)
2021–2022	→ Santa Lucía (loan)	16	(0)
2022–2023	→ CSD Mixco (loan)	16	(0)

International career^{‡}
2019	Guatemala U17	1	(0)
2023	Guatemala U23	1	(0)
2021–	Guatemala	5	(0)
- * Club domestic league appearances and goals as of 5 October 2025 ‡ National team caps and goals as of 5 October 2025

Kenderson Navarro (born 25 February 2002) is a Guatemalan professional footballer who plays as a goalkeeper for Liga Guate club Municipal and the Guatemala national team.

== Club career ==
Navarro has played for C.S.D Municipal since 2019.

In December 2020, Navarro was the recipient of criticism after appearing for Municipal only six days after testing positive for COVID-19 in the midst of the global pandemic.

== International career ==
Navarro made his competitive debut for Guatemala in a 1–1 draw against Trinidad and Tobago during the 2021 CONCACAF Gold Cup.

He appeared again for Los Chapines in the knockout stages of the 2025 CONCACAF Gold Cup after an injury to Nicholas Hagen. In the quarter-final, after a 1–1 draw again Canada after regulation time, Navarro helped his team in an upset 6–5 in the penalty shootout. Navarro would also feature in the semi-final against the United States, which Guatemala would go on to lose 2–1.
