= Kevin Ramírez (footballer, born 2002) =

Guatemalan footballer (born 2002)

Personal information
- Date of birth: 1 August 2002 (age 24)
- Place of birth: San Sebastián, Guatemala
- Position: Left midfielder

Team information
- Current team: C.D. Malacateco

Senior career*
Years	Team	Apps	(Gls)
2018–2019	C.D. Petapa	1	(0)
2019–	C.D. Malacateco	191	(22)

International career^{‡}
2019–2023	Guatemala U17	4	(0)
2023–	Guatemala U23	2	(0)
2023–	Guatemala	8	(0)
- * Club domestic league appearances and goals as of 6 June 2026 ‡ National team caps and goals as of 6 June 2026

Kevin Ramírez (born 1 August 2002) is a Guatemalan professional footballer who currently plays for Liga Bantrab club C.D. Malacateco and the Guatemala national football team, primarily being deployed as a left midfielder.

== Club career ==
=== C.D. Malacateco ===
Ramírez has been a frequent feature for Malacateco, scoring in critical matches for the club and becoming well-liked among the club's supporters. He is also the club captain.

In 2026, after Malaceteco failed to reach the latter stages of the league and narrowly avoiding relegation in a difficult campaign, he was rumored to be considering a move to other teams in the league.

== International career ==
Ramírez was selected and played for the Guatemala squad in the 2025 CONCACAF Gold Cup, where Guatemala reached the semi-finals before losing to the United States 2–1.

He has also appeared for Guatemala after the Gold Cup, being selected for the squad in friendly games against Czechia and Ecuador.
