= Zoran Moco =

Guadeloupean footballer (born 2003)

Personal information
- Date of birth: 27 June 2003 (age 23)
- Place of birth: Les Abymes, Guadeloupe
- Height: 1.81 m (5 ft 11 1/2 in)
- Positions: Right-back; central midfielder

Team information
- Current team: Boulogne
- Number: 97

Youth career
- MJC Les Abymes
- –2021: CERFA
- 2021–2022: Dijon

Senior career*
Years	Team	Apps	(Gls)
2022–2023	Dijon B	36	(7)
2023–2026	Dijon	62	(5)
2026–	Boulogne	12	(0)

International career^{‡}
2024–	Guadeloupe	8	(0)
- * Club domestic league appearances and goals as of 21 November 2026 ‡ National team caps and goals as of 25 June 2026

Zoran Moco (born 27 June 2003) is a Guadeloupean professional footballer who plays as a right-back or central midfielder for Ligue 2 club Boulogne and the Guadeloupe national team.

== Early life and club career ==
Moco started playing football in Guadeloupe at the age of six. In 2021, he moved to France to join Dijon, later signing his first professional contract with the club in May 2023.

On 1 February 2026, Moco joined Ligue 2 side Boulogne, on a two-and-a-half-year contract. In April 2026, he suffered an injury which ruled him out for the rest of the 2025–26 season.

== International career ==
Moco was first called up for the Guadeloupe national team in October 2024, with his debut coming on 11 October 2024, in a 2024–25 CONCACAF Nations League A match against Martinique. He was included in Guadeloupe's squad for the 2025 CONCACAF Gold Cup, making his tournament debut as a substitute in their opening match against Panama.

== Personal life ==
Moco idolizes former Brazilian footballer Ronaldinho.
