= Ismael Díaz (footballer, born 1997) =

Panamanian footballer

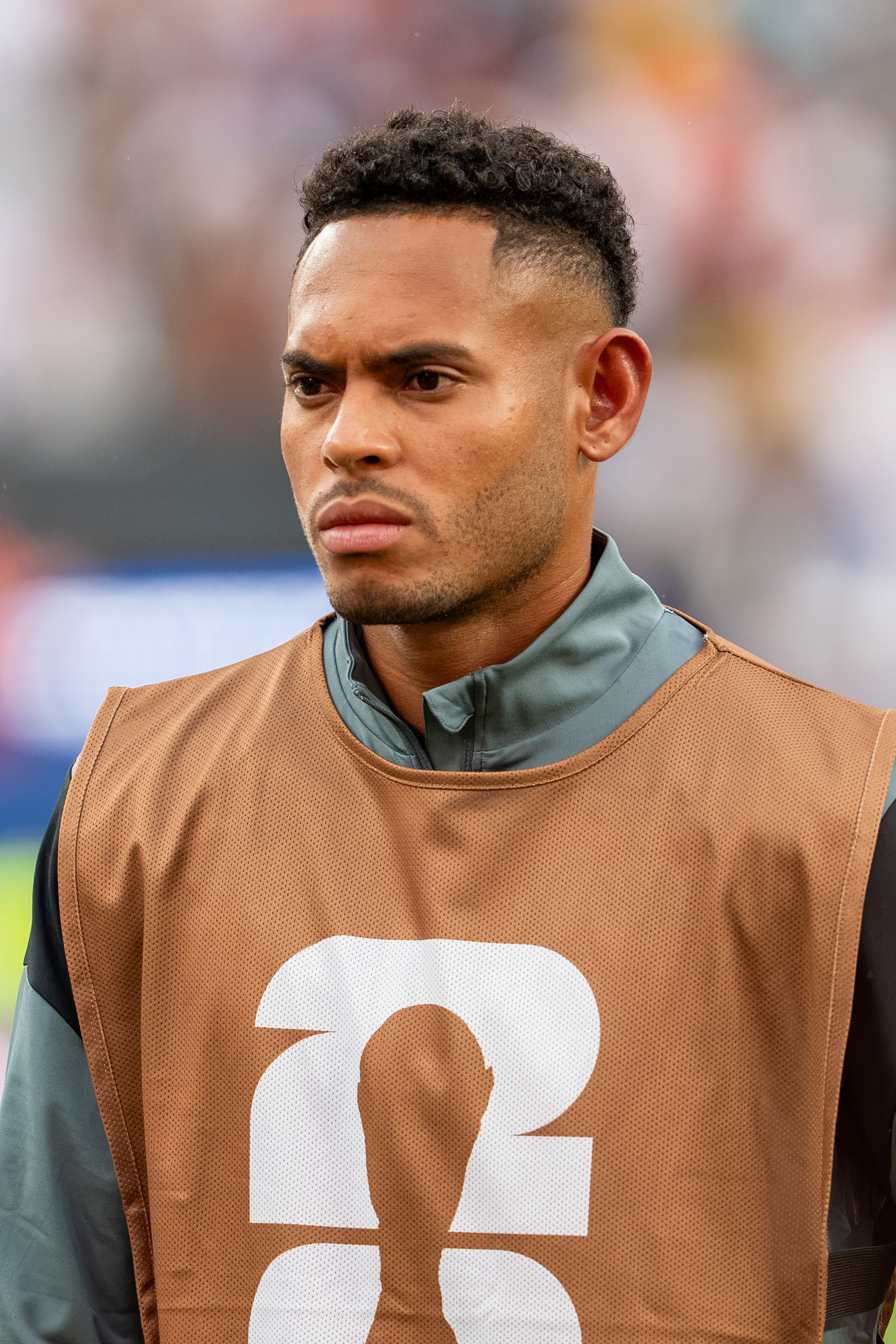
- Díaz with Panama in 2026

Personal information
- Full name: Ismael Díaz de León
- Date of birth: 12 May 1997 (age 29)
- Place of birth: Panama City, Panama
- Height: 1.85 m (6 ft 1 in)
- Position: Winger

Team information
- Current team: León
- Number: 11

Senior career*
Years	Team	Apps	(Gls)
2012–2017	Tauro	27	(3)
2015–2017	→ Porto B (loan)	57	(15)
2017–2018	Deportivo B	12	(6)
2018–2019	El Tanque Sisley	0	(0)
2019	Académico Viseu	0	(0)
2020–2022	Tauro	42	(17)
2022–2025	Universidad Católica (ECU)	86	(38)
2025–	León	37	(13)

International career^{‡}
2013	Panama U17	8	(3)
2015	Panama U20	6	(4)
2014–	Panama	59	(17)
Medal record
Men's football
Representing Panama
CONCACAF Gold Cup
Runner-up	2023 United States–Canada	Team
CONCACAF Nations League
Runner-up	2025 United States	Team
- * Club domestic league appearances and goals as of 06:56, 22 October 2026 (UTC) ‡ National team caps and goals as of 23:50, 27 June 2026 (UTC)

Ismael Díaz de León (born 12 May 1997) is a Panamanian professional footballer who plays as a left winger for Liga MX club León and the Panama national team.

== Club career ==
Born in Panama City, Díaz made his professional debut for Tauro on 2 September 2012 against Alianza, aged just 15 years and 2 months. He had a trial with Dutch club PSV Eindhoven in summer 2014. In August 2015, he joined Portuguese club FC Porto on a loan. On 2017 the loan ended due to FC Porto order.

On 31 August 2019, Díaz joined Académico Viseu. He left the club at the end of the year and returned to Tauro in January 2020.

On 6 January 2022, Ecuadorian Serie A club Universidad Católica, announced the signing of Ismael Díaz, in time for the start of the 2022 Ecuadorian Serie A season, as well as the 2022 Copa Libertadores. Díaz had made an immediate impact during his first two weeks at the club, scoring 2 league goals in his first 2 matches, which earned him being selected "Best Player of Matchday 1 of Serie A". Díaz then scored 2 more goals in the second stage of the Libertadores Cup group stage qualifiers, helping La Católica to a 3–1 aggregate win over Bolivian side Club Bolívar.

On 25 July 2025, Díaz joined Mexican club León.

== International career ==
He played at the 2013 FIFA U-17 World Cup in the United Arab Emirates and the 2015 FIFA U-20 World Cup in New Zealand.

Díaz made his senior debut for Panama in an August 2014 friendly match against Cuba.

In June 2018 he was announced to be part of Panama's squad for the 2018 FIFA World Cup in Russia, and he made one appearance as a substitute against Belgium in a 3–0 loss during the group stage.

On 8 July 2023, Díaz scored a hat-trick against Qatar during the quarter-finals of the 2023 CONCACAF Gold Cup in a 4–0 win. On 24 June 2025, he scored another hat-trick in the Gold Cup, this time against Jamaica.

== Career statistics ==
=== International ===
As of match played on 27 June 2026

Appearances and goals by national team and year
National team	Year	Apps	Goals
Panama	2014	1	1
Panama	2015	1	0
Panama	2016	1	0
Panama	2017	7	1
Panama	2018	3	0
Panama	2021	1	0
Panama	2022	8	3
Panama	2023	15	4
Panama	2024	5	0
Panama	2025	11	8
Panama	2026	6	0
Total		59	17

Scores and results list Panama's goal tally first.

List of international goals scored by Ismael Díaz
No.	Date	Venue	Opponent	Score	Result	Competition
1	20 August 2014	Estadio Rommel Fernández, Panama City, Panama	Cuba	4–0	4–0	Friendly
2	12 July 2017	Raymond James Stadium, Tampa, United States	Nicaragua	1–1	2–1	2017 CONCACAF Gold Cup
3	2 June 2022	Estadio Rommel Fernández, Panama City, Panama	Costa Rica	1–0	2–0	2022–23 CONCACAF Nations League A
4	27 September 2022	Bahrain National Stadium, Riffa, Bahrain	Bahrain	2–0	2–0	Friendly
5	10 November 2022	Al Nahyan Stadium, Abu Dhabi, United Arab Emirates	Saudi Arabia	1–0	1–1	Friendly
6	4 July 2023	Shell Energy Stadium, Houston, United States	El Salvador	2–1	2–2	2023 CONCACAF Gold Cup
7	8 July 2023	AT&T Stadium, Arlington, United States	Qatar	2–0	4–0	2023 CONCACAF Gold Cup
8	8 July 2023	AT&T Stadium, Arlington, United States	Qatar	3–0	4–0	2023 CONCACAF Gold Cup
9	8 July 2023	AT&T Stadium, Arlington, United States	Qatar	4–0	4–0	2023 CONCACAF Gold Cup
10	10 June 2025	Estadio Rommel Fernández, Panama City, Panama	Nicaragua	2–0	3–0	2026 FIFA World Cup qualification
11	16 June 2025	Dignity Health Sports Park, Carson, United States	Guadeloupe	2–0	5–2	2025 CONCACAF Gold Cup
12	16 June 2025	Dignity Health Sports Park, Carson, United States	Guadeloupe	3–0	5–2	2025 CONCACAF Gold Cup
13	24 June 2025	Q2 Stadium, Austin, United States	Jamaica	1–0	4–1	2025 CONCACAF Gold Cup
14	24 June 2025	Q2 Stadium, Austin, United States	Jamaica	2–0	4–1	2025 CONCACAF Gold Cup
15	24 June 2025	Q2 Stadium, Austin, United States	Jamaica	3–1	4–1	2025 CONCACAF Gold Cup
16	28 June 2025	State Farm Stadium, Glendale, United States	Honduras	1–0	1–1 (4–5 p)	2025 CONCACAF Gold Cup
17	14 October 2025	Rommel Fernández Stadium, Panama City, Panama	Suriname	1–1	1–1	2026 FIFA World Cup qualification

== Honours ==
Porto B

- Segunda Liga: 2015–16
- Premier League International Cup: 2016–17

Panama Youth

- CONCACAF U-17 Championship runner-up: 2013
- CONCACAF U-20 Championship runner-up: 2015

Panama

- CONCACAF Gold Cup runner-up: 2023
- CONCACAF Nations League runner-up: 2024–25

Individual

- CONCACAF Gold Cup Golden Boot: 2025
- CONCACAF Gold Cup Best XI: 2023, 2025
