= Dixon Ramírez =

Honduran football player (born 2001)

Personal information
- Full name: Dixon Fermín Ramírez Rochez
- Date of birth: 15 April 2001 (age 25)
- Place of birth: Balfate, Honduras
- Height: 1.76 m (5 ft 9 in)
- Position: Winger

Team information
- Current team: Real España
- Number: 15

Senior career*
Years	Team	Apps	(Gls)
2018–2021	Juticalpa	4	(0)
2021–2023	Honduras Progreso	56	(6)
2023–	Real España	78	(11)

International career^{‡}
2025–	Honduras	4	(1)
- * Club domestic league appearances and goals as of 06:15, 4 April 2026 (UTC) ‡ National team caps and goals as of 06:15, 4 April 2026 (UTC)

Dixon Fermín Ramírez Rochez (born 15 April 2001) is a Honduran professional football player who plays as a winger for Liga Nacional club Real España and the Honduras national team.

== Career ==
Ramírez began his senior career in the Liga Nacional de Fútbol Profesional de Honduras in 2018 with Juticalpa. In 2021, he joined Honduras Progreso. On 24 May 2025, he transferred to Real España.

== International career ==
Ramírez was called up to the Honduras national team for the 2025 CONCACAF Gold Cup. He scored his debut goal in a 2–0 win over El Salvador on 22 June 2025.
