= Keylor Herrera =

Costa Rican football referee (born 1993)

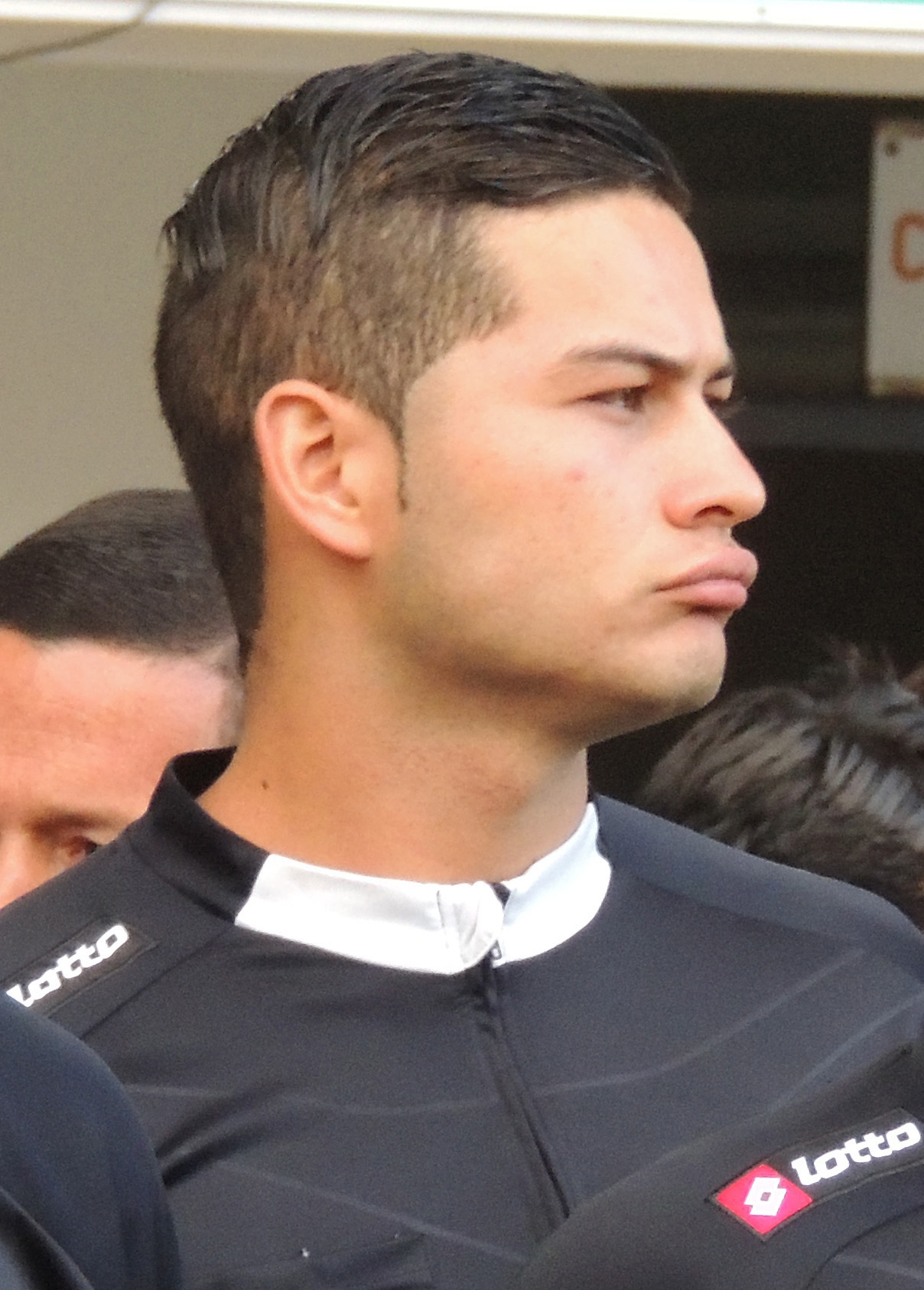
- Herrera in 2015
- Full name: Keylor Herrera Villalobos
- Born: 7 January 1993 (age 33); Alajuela, Costa Rica

Domestic
Years	League	Role
2013–	Liga FPD	Referee

International
Years	League	Role
2019–	FIFA listed	Referee

Keylor Herrera Villalobos (born 7 January 1993) is a Costa Rican football referee who officiates in the Liga FPD and who has been FIFA-listed since 2019.

== Career ==
Born in Alajuela, Costa Rica, Herrera began his career in refereeing in 2013. He has since officiated in his native country's Liga FPD and other local leagues like the Supercopa de Costa Rica and the Costa Rican Cup, and in foreign leagues like the Leagues Cup, the CONCACAF Champions Cup, the CONCACAF League and the Caribbean Club Championship.

In national teams tournaments, Herrera made his debut in the 2018 CONCACAF U-20 Championship in the United States. In 2019, he obtained the FIFA badge and got his first senior assignment at the 2019 CONCACAF Gold Cup. Herrera also oversaw games in the Gold Cup's 2023 and 2025 editions.

Outside regional tournaments, Herrera was selected for two FIFA youth World Cups: the 2023 FIFA U-17 World Cup in Indonesia and the 2025 FIFA U-20 World Cup in Chile.

=== Controversies ===
In March 2023, Herrera filed a defamation lawsuit against four other Costa Rican referees, who had accused him of leaking conversations of local referees to the Costa Rican Football Federation.

In April 2025, during a local league match between Deportivo Saprissa and Club Sport Cartaginés, Herrera invalidated a legitimate goal by Saprissa's player Gino Vivi, ending the match in a 1–1 draw and complicating the situation of Saprissa. The Costa Rican Referees Federation reprimanded and suspended Herrera after a formal complaint by Deportivo Saprissa.

In June 2025, Herrera saw himself involved in another controversy, this time at the 2025 CONCACAF Gold Cup quarterfinal match between Canada and Guatemala, where he gave a Canada a non-existent penalty kick, which took the game to a final draw and a definition by penalties which was ultimately won by Guatemala.
