= Óscar Castellanos =

Guatemalan footballer

Personal information
- Full name: Óscar Antonio Castellanos Santos
- Date of birth: 18 January 2000 (age 26)
- Place of birth: Quetzaltenango, Guatemala
- Height: 1.78 m (5 ft 10 in)
- Position: Defensive midfielder

Team information
- Current team: Antigua
- Number: 17

Youth career
- Antigua

Senior career*
Years	Team	Apps	(Gls)
2017–	Antigua	209	(8)
2020	→ Mixco (loan)	12	(1)
2020–2021	→ Xelajú (loan)	18	(0)

International career^{‡}
2018	Guatemala U20	4	(0)
2019	Guatemala U23	4	(0)
2021–	Guatemala	53	(3)
- * Club domestic league appearances and goals as of 20:00, 18 May 2025 (UTC) ‡ National team caps and goals as of 20:00, 24 June 2025 (UTC)

Óscar Antonio Castellanos Santos (born 18 January 2000), commonly known as Coca, is a Guatemalan professional footballer who plays as a defensive midfielder for Liga Nacional club Antigua and the Guatemala national team.

== International career ==
Castellanos made his debut for the senior Guatemalan team against Puerto Rico on 23 January 2021.

=== 2023: second CONCACAF Gold Cup ===
On 21 June 2023, Castellanos was called up to the Guatemala squad for the 2023 CONCACAF Gold Cup.

=== 2025: third CONCACAF Gold Cup ===
On 24 June 2025, in the third match of Group C, Castellanos suffered an ankle fracture against Guadeloupe and, as a result, had to receive medical assistance and was replaced by Stheven Robles. Despite the injury, Guatemala would win 3–2 and advance to the quarter-finals.

== Career statistics ==
=== International ===
As of match played 14 June 2024

National team	Year	Apps	Goals
Guatemala	2021	5	0
Guatemala	2022	12	0
Guatemala	2023	17	1
Guatemala	2024	7	1
Total		41	2

As of match played 8 June 2024
Guatemala score listed first, score column indicates score after each Castellanos goal.

List of international goals scored by Óscar Castellanos
No.	Date	Venue	Cap	Opponent	Score	Result	Competition	Ref.
1	24 March 2023	FFB Stadium, Belmopan, Belize	19	Belize	1–0	2–1	2022–23 CONCACAF Nations League B	
2	8 June 2024	A. O. Shirley Recreation Ground, Road Town, British Virgin Islands	40	British Virgin Islands	1–0	3–0	2026 FIFA World Cup qualification	
