= Jon Russell (footballer) =

Jamaican footballer (born 2000)

Personal information
- Full name: Jonathan Edward Russell
- Date of birth: 9 October 2000 (age 26)
- Place of birth: Hounslow, England
- Height: 6 ft 4 in (1.93 m)
- Position: Midfielder

Team information
- Current team: Mansfield Town
- Number: 13

Youth career
- 2007–2020: Chelsea

Senior career*
Years	Team	Apps	(Gls)
2020–2021	Chelsea	0	(0)
2020–2021	→ Accrington Stanley (loan)	25	(2)
2021–2023	Huddersfield Town	24	(2)
2023–2026	Barnsley	95	(14)
2026	→ Mansfield Town (loan)	21	(5)
2026–	Mansfield Town	10	(3)

International career^{‡}
2023–	Jamaica	17	(5)
- * Club domestic league appearances and goals as of 12:08, 22 November 2026 (UTC) ‡ National team caps and goals as of 22:27, 18 November 2025 (UTC)

Jonathan Edward Russell (born 9 October 2000) is a professional footballer who plays as a midfielder for Mansfield Town. Born in England, he represents the Jamaica national team.

== Club career ==
=== Chelsea ===
Born in Hounslow, Russell joined Chelsea at under-7 level. He turned professional in October 2017. He moved on loan to Accrington Stanley in October 2020. He moved to Huddersfield Town in July 2021. He scored his first goal for the club on 23 February 2022 when he scored a late winner in a 2–1 win against Cardiff City.

=== Barnsley ===
On 31 January 2023, Russell joined EFL League One side Barnsley for an undisclosed fee.

=== Mansfield Town ===
On 8 January 2026, Russell joined fellow League One club Mansfield Town on loan until the end of the season.

On 20 May 2026, Russell agreed to return to Mansfield Town on a permanent two-year deal upon the expiry of his contract with Barnsley.

== International career ==
On 13 September 2022, Russell was called up by the Jamaica national football team.

On 26 March 2023, Russell makes his debut for Jamaica in the 2022–23 CONCACAF Nations League group play match against Mexico entering in the 66th minute for Ravel Morrison.

== Style of play ==
He has been described as "a very tall box-to-box midfield player who can also play as a number 10 and has a great eye for a pass".

== Personal life ==
Russell is a member of the Church of Jesus Christ of Latter-day Saints.

== Career statistics ==
=== Club ===
As of match played 21 November 2026

Appearances and goals by club, season and competition
Club	Season	League			FA Cup		League Cup		Other		Total	
Club	Season	Division	Apps	Goals	Apps	Goals	Apps	Goals	Apps	Goals	Apps	Goals
Chelsea	2020–21	Premier League	0	0	0	0	0	0	—		0	0
Accrington Stanley (loan)	2020–21	League One	25	2	1	0	0	0	0	0	26	2
Huddersfield Town	2021–22	Championship	17	2	2	0	0	0	3	0	22	2
Huddersfield Town	2022–23	Championship	6	0	0	0	1	0	0	0	8	0
Huddersfield Town	Total		24	2	2	0	1	0	3	0	30	2
Barnsley	2022–23	League One	12	0	0	0	0	0	2 (Note: Appearances in League One play-offs)	0	14	0
Barnsley	2023–24	League One	31	2	0	0	1	0	1 (Note: Appearance in the EFL Trophy.)	1	33	3
Barnsley	2024–25	League One	40	11	2	0	2	0	2	0	46	11
Barnsley	2025–26	League One	12	1	2	0	3	2	3	1	20	4
Barnsley	Total		95	14	4	0	6	2	8	2	113	18
Mansfield Town (loan)	2025–26	League One	21	5	3	0	—		—		24	5
Mansfield Town	2026–27	League One	10	3	1	0	1	0	2	2	14	5
Career total			175	26	11	0	8	2	13	4	207	32

=== International ===
As of match played 18 November 2025

National team	Year	Apps	Goals
Jamaica	2023	4	1
Jamaica	2025	13	4
Total		17	5

Scores and results list Jamaica's goal tally first, score column indicates score after each Russell goal.

List of international goals scored by Jon Russell
No.	Date	Venue	Opponent	Score	Result	Competition
1	2 July 2023	Levi's Stadium, Santa Clara, United States	Saint Kitts and Nevis	2–0	5–0	2023 CONCACAF Gold Cup
2	31 May 2025	Brentford Community Stadium, London, England	Nigeria	1–0	2–2	2025 Unity Cup
3	10 June 2025	Independence Park, Kingston, Jamaica	Guatemala	1–0	3–0	2026 FIFA World Cup qualification
4	20 June 2025	PayPal Park, San Jose, United States	Guadeloupe	2–1	2–1	2025 CONCACAF Gold Cup
5	10 September 2025	Independence Park, Kingston, Jamaica	Trinidad and Tobago	2–0	2–0	2026 FIFA World Cup qualification
