= Alexandre Arenate =

Guadeloupean footballer (born 1995)

Personal information
- Full name: Alexandre Frédéric Arenate
- Date of birth: 20 July 1995 (age 31)
- Place of birth: Paris, France
- Height: 1.80 m (5 ft 11 in)
- Positions: Midfielder; winger

Team information
- Current team: Jeunesse
- Number: 14

Senior career*
Years	Team	Apps	(Gls)
2013–2015	Rennes B	30	(9)
2015	Red Star	1	(0)
2016	Chambly	9	(1)
2016–2018	Virton	51	(12)
2018–2020	Dender	49	(15)
2021–2022	Patro Eisden	22	(5)
2022	Solières		
2023–	Jeunesse	32	(9)

International career
2023–	Guadeloupe	5	(0)
- * Club domestic league appearances and goals

Alexandre Frédéric Arenate (born 20 July 1995) is a footballer who plays as a midfielder or winger for Jeunesse. Born in the France, he is a Guadeloupe international.

== Early life ==
As a youth player, Arenate joined the youth academy of French Ligue 1 side PSG. He was teammates with France international Kingsley Coman while playing for the club.

== Career ==
In 2023, Arenate signed for Luxembourgish side Jeunesse. He was described as "the top Eschois scorer of the return phase with 6 goals in 14 DN matches" during the 2022/23 season while playing for the club.

== Style of play ==
Arenate mainly operates as a midfielder or winger. He is known for his shooting ability.

== Personal life ==
Arenate was born in 1995 in France. He is a native of Paris, France.
