= Jordan Leborgne =

Guadeloupean footballer (born 1995)

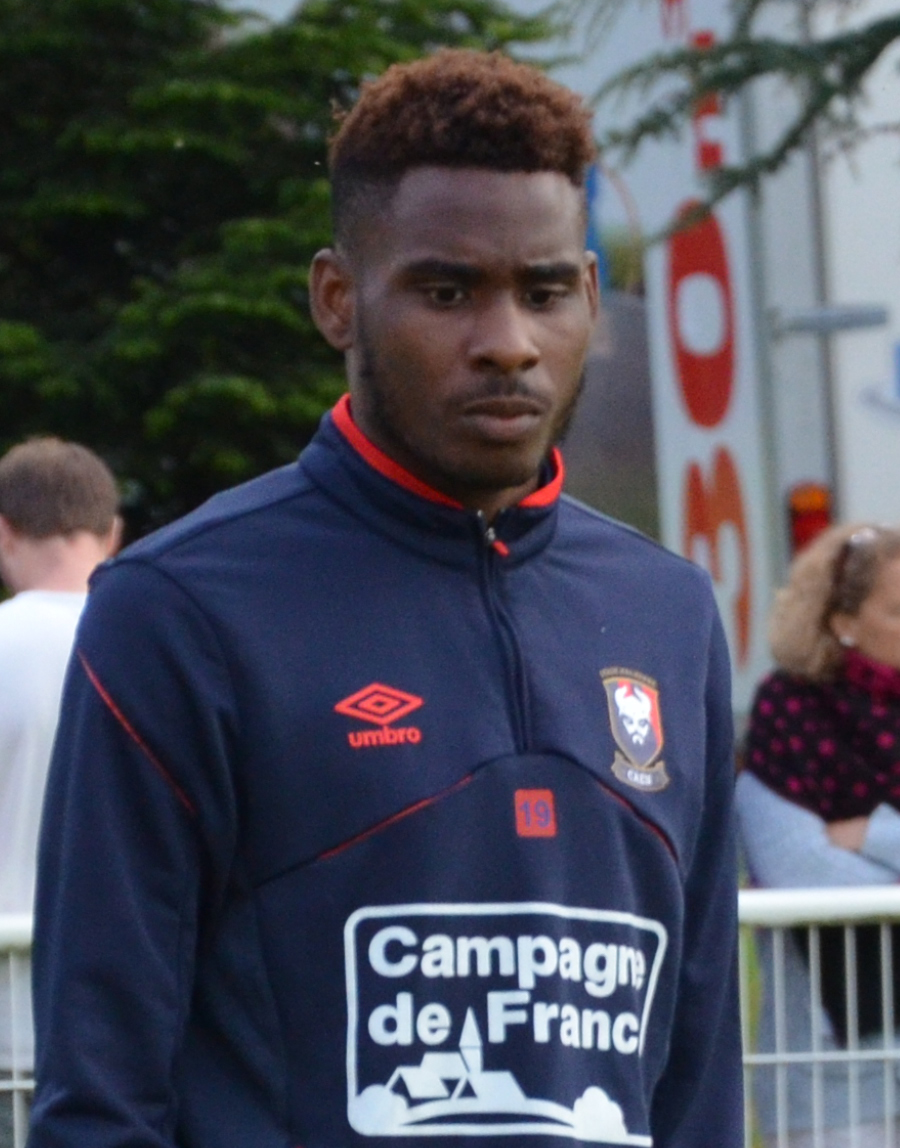
- Leborgne with Caen in 2016

Personal information
- Date of birth: 29 September 1995 (age 31)
- Place of birth: Pointe-à-Pitre, Guadeloupe, France
- Height: 1.73 m (5 ft 8 in)
- Position: Midfielder

Team information
- Current team: Versailles
- Number: 18

Youth career
- 2010–2015: Caen

Senior career*
Years	Team	Apps	(Gls)
2013–2018	Caen B	70	(0)
2015–2018	Caen	20	(0)
2019	Berja CF	3	(0)
2019–2020	Guingamp B	16	(1)
2020–2022	Rodez	58	(5)
2022–2024	Versailles	51	(2)
2024–2026	Quevilly-Rouen	57	(9)
2026–	Versailles	2	(0)

International career^{‡}
2022–	Guadeloupe	13	(3)
- * Club domestic league appearances and goals as of 11:56, 15 August 2026 (UTC) ‡ National team caps and goals as of 1:00, 10 September 2024 (UTC)

Jordan Leborgne (born 29 September 1995) is a Guadeloupean professional footballer who plays as a midfielder for Ligue 3 club Versailles and the Guadeloupe national team.

== Club career ==
Leborgne is a youth exponent from Caen. He made his Ligue 1 debut on 12 September 2015 against Troyes.

On 5 July 2022, Leborgne signed with Versailles. He returned to the club in 2026.

== International career ==
Leborgne debuted for the Guadeloupe national team in a friendly 2–0 loss to Cape Verde on 23 March 2022.

=== International goals ===
Scores and results list Guadeloupe's goal tally first, score column indicates score after each Leborgne goal.

List of international goals scored by Jordan Leborgne
No.	Date	Venue	Opponent	Score	Result	Competition
1	9 September 2024	Stade Roger Zemi, Le Gosier, Guadeloupe	Suriname	1–0	1–0	2024–25 CONCACAF Nations League A
2	15 November 2024	Truman Bodden Sports Complex, George Town, Cayman Islands	Cayman Islands	2–0	6–0	2024–25 CONCACAF Nations League Play-in
3	16 June 2025	Dignity Health Sports Park, Carson, United States	Panama	1–4	2–5	2025 CONCACAF Gold Cup
