= Tomás Rodríguez (footballer) =

Panamanian footballer (born 1999)

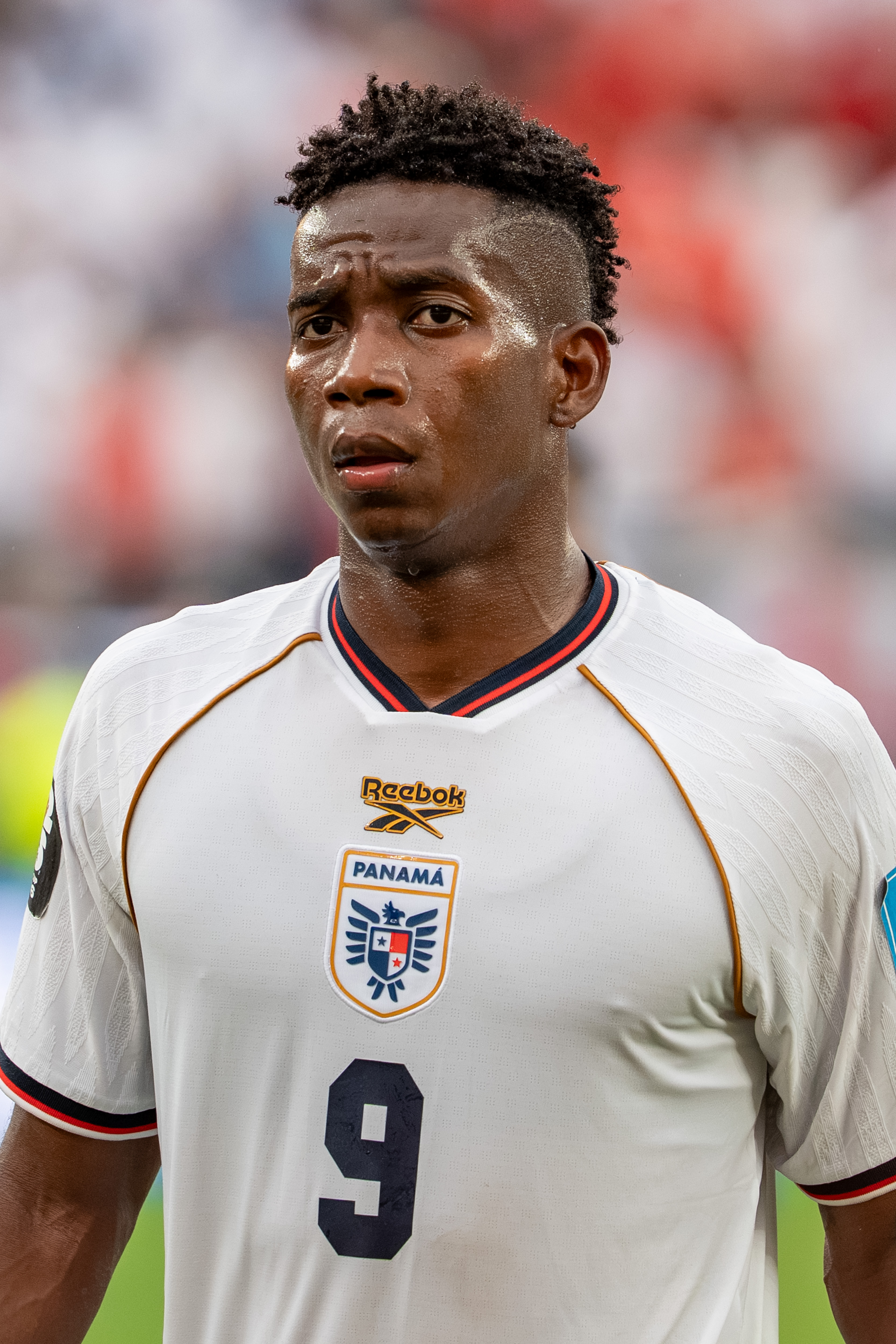
- Rodríguez with Panama in 2026

Personal information
- Full name: Tomás Abdiel Rodríguez Mena
- Date of birth: 9 March 1999 (age 27)
- Place of birth: Panama City, Panama
- Height: 1.83 m (6 ft 0 in)
- Position: Forward

Team information
- Current team: Barcelona
- Number: 11

Senior career*
Years	Team	Apps	(Gls)
2016–2020	Alianza	47	(5)
2020–2023	Sporting San Miguelito	72	(12)
2024–2026	Monagas	57	(24)
2025–2026	→ Deportivo Saprissa (loan)	22	(6)
2026–	Barcelona	11	(3)

International career^{‡}
2022–	Panama	17	(4)
- * Club domestic league appearances and goals as of 13 September 2026 ‡ National team caps and goals as of 5 October 2026

Tomás Abdiel Rodríguez Mena (born 9 March 1999) is a Panamanian footballer who plays as a forward for Barcelona and Panama national team.

== Club career ==
In 2024, Rodríguez signed for Venezuelan side Monagas. He was regarded as one of the club's most important players.

== International career ==
Rodríguez is a Panama international. He played his first FIFA matches for the Panama national team during friendlies against Guatemala and Nicaragua. He scored his first goal for Panama in the 2025 Gold Cup against Guadeloupe. He also scored against Guatemala and Jamaica to make him the first ever Panamanian player to score in their first three gold cup appearances.

== Style of play ==
Rodríguez mainly operates as a striker. He is known for his ball control.

== Career statistics ==
=== International ===
As of match played 5 October 2026

Appearances and goals by national team and year
National team	Year	Apps	Goals
Panama	2022	1	0
Panama	2023	2	0
Panama	2024	1	0
Panama	2025	7	3
Panama	2026	6	1
Total		17	4

List of international goals scored by Tomás Rodríguez
No.	Date	Venue	Opponent	Score	Result	Competition
1	16 June 2025	Dignity Health Sports Park, Carson, United States	Guadeloupe	5–2	5–2	2025 CONCACAF Gold Cup
2	20 June 2025	Q2 Stadium, Austin, United States	Guatemala	1–0	1–0	2025 CONCACAF Gold Cup
3	24 June 2025	Q2 Stadium, Austin, United States	Jamaica	4–1	4–1	2025 CONCACAF Gold Cup
4	3 June 2026	Estadio Rommel Fernández, Panama City, Panama	Dominican Republic	1–0	4–2	Friendly
