= José Rosales (footballer) =

Guatemalan footballer

Personal information
- Full name: José Mario Rosales Marroquín
- Date of birth: 24 June 1993 (age 33)
- Place of birth: Mixco, Guatemala
- Height: 1.76 m (5 ft 9 in)
- Position: Defensive midfielder

Team information
- Current team: Antigua
- Number: 6

Youth career
- 2006–2009: Gremio Cejusa
- 2009–2014: Club Juventud

Senior career*
Years	Team	Apps	(Gls)
2015–2017	Malacateco	55	(1)
2017–2018	Xelajú	12	(0)
2018–2019	Petapa	19	(1)
2019–2025	Municipal	179	(1)
2023	→Xinabajul (loan)	14	(0)
2024	→Guastatoya (loan)	15	(1)
2024–	Antigua	28	(1)

International career^{‡}
2016–	Guatemala	18	(1)
- * Club domestic league appearances and goals as of 22:00, 16 November 2025 (UTC) ‡ National team caps and goals as of 22:00, 16 November 2025 (UTC)

José Mario Rosales Marroquín (born 24 June 1993), sometimes known as Chema Rosales, is a Guatemalan professional footballer who plays as a defensive midfielder for the Liga Guate club Antigua and the Guatemala national team.

== Club career ==
=== Malacateco ===
Rosales began his senior career with Malacateco in 2015 in the Liga Guate.

=== Xelajú ===
In 2018, he had a short stint with Xelajú before moving to Petapa for a season.

=== Municipal ===
In January 2019, he transferred to Municipal. He helped Municipal win the 2020 Apertura.

==== 2023–24: Loan to Xinabajul ====
In 2023, he joined Xinabajul on a season long loan.

==== 2024: Loan to Guastatoya ====
For the 2024 season, he went to Guastatoya on loan.

=== Antigua ===
On 20 December 2024, he transferred to Antigua. He helped Antigua win the 2025 Clausura.

== International career ==
Rosales was called up to the Guatemala national team for the 2025 CONCACAF Gold Cup.

== Honours ==
Municipal

- Liga Guate: 2020 Apertura

Antigua

- Liga Guate: 2025 Clausura
