= José Carlos Pinto =

Guatemalan footballer (born 1993)

Personal information
- Full name: José Carlos Pinto Samayoa
- Date of birth: 16 June 1993 (age 33)
- Place of birth: San Luis Jilotepeque, Guatemala
- Height: 1.75 m (5 ft 9 in)
- Position: Centre-back

Team information
- Current team: Comunicaciones
- Number: 6

Youth career
- 1999–2008: René Urrutia
- 2008–2009: Jalapa

Senior career*
Years	Team	Apps	(Gls)
2009–2010	Sacachispas		
2011–2013	Malacateco	58	(0)
2013–2015	Municipal	32	(0)
2015–2020	Antigua	210	(2)
2020–2022	Comunicaciones	50	(0)
2022	Tacuary	13	(0)
2022–	Comunicaciones	107	(0)

International career^{‡}
2012	Guatemala U20	2	(0)
2016–	Guatemala	81	(4)
- * Club domestic league appearances and goals as of 19:43, 20 July 2025 (UTC) ‡ National team caps and goals as of 19:43, 27 March 2026 (UTC)

José Carlos Pinto Samayoa (born 16 June 1993) is a Guatemalan professional footballer who plays as a centre-back for Liga Guate club Comunicaciones and captains the Guatemala national team.

== Club career ==
=== Malacateco ===
Pinto began his senior career with Malacateco, before moving to Municipal in 2013.

=== Antigua ===
In 2015, he transferred to Antigua where he made over 200 appearances for the club, and help them win 4 Liga Nacional de Fútbol de Guatemala in 5 years.

=== Comunicaciones ===
On 8 June 2020, he transferred to Comunicaciones.

=== Tacuary ===
On 9 January 2022 of Paraguay's summer transfer window, Pinto officially completed a transfer to Tacuary.

=== Return to Comunicaciones ===
On 1 July 2022, he returned to Comunicaciones on a free transfer.

== International career ==
Pinto made his international debut for the Guatemala national team in a friendly 7–1 loss to Armenia on 28 May 2016.

=== 2023: second CONCACAF Gold Cup ===
Pinto was called up to the Guatemala squad for the 2023 CONCACAF Gold Cup.

=== 2025: third CONCACAF Gold Cup ===
On 24 June 2025, in the third and final match of Group C, Pinto scored from a penalty kick to give Guatemala a 1–0 lead over Guadeloupe. Guatemala would end up with a 3–2 win and advance to the quarter-finals.

== Personal life ==
Pinto's uncle, Manuel Vásquez, was also a professional footballer in Guatemala.

== Career statistics ==
=== International goals ===
Scores and results list Guatemala goal tally first, score column indicates score after each Pinto goal

List of international goals scored by José Carlos Pinto
No.	Date	Venue	Opponent	Score	Result	Competition
1	8 June 2024	A. O. Shirley Recreation Ground, Road Town, British Virgin Islands	British Virgin Islands	3–0	3–0	2026 FIFA World Cup qualification
2	5 September 2024	Estadio Doroteo Guamuch Flores, Guatemala City, Guatemala	Martinique	2–1	3–1	2024–25 CONCACAF Nations League
3	21 March 2025	BFA Technical Centre, Bridgetown, Barbados	Guyana	2–3	2–3	2025 CONCACAF Gold Cup qualification
4	24 June 2025	Shell Energy Stadium, Houston, United States	Guadeloupe	1–0	3–2	2025 CONCACAF Gold Cup

== Honours ==
Antigua

- Liga Nacional: 2015 Apertura, 2016 Apertura, 2017 Apertura, 2019 Clausura

Comunicaciones

- CONCACAF League: 2021
- Liga Nacional: 2023 Apertura
