= Ange-Freddy Plumain =

Guadeloupean footballer (born 1995)

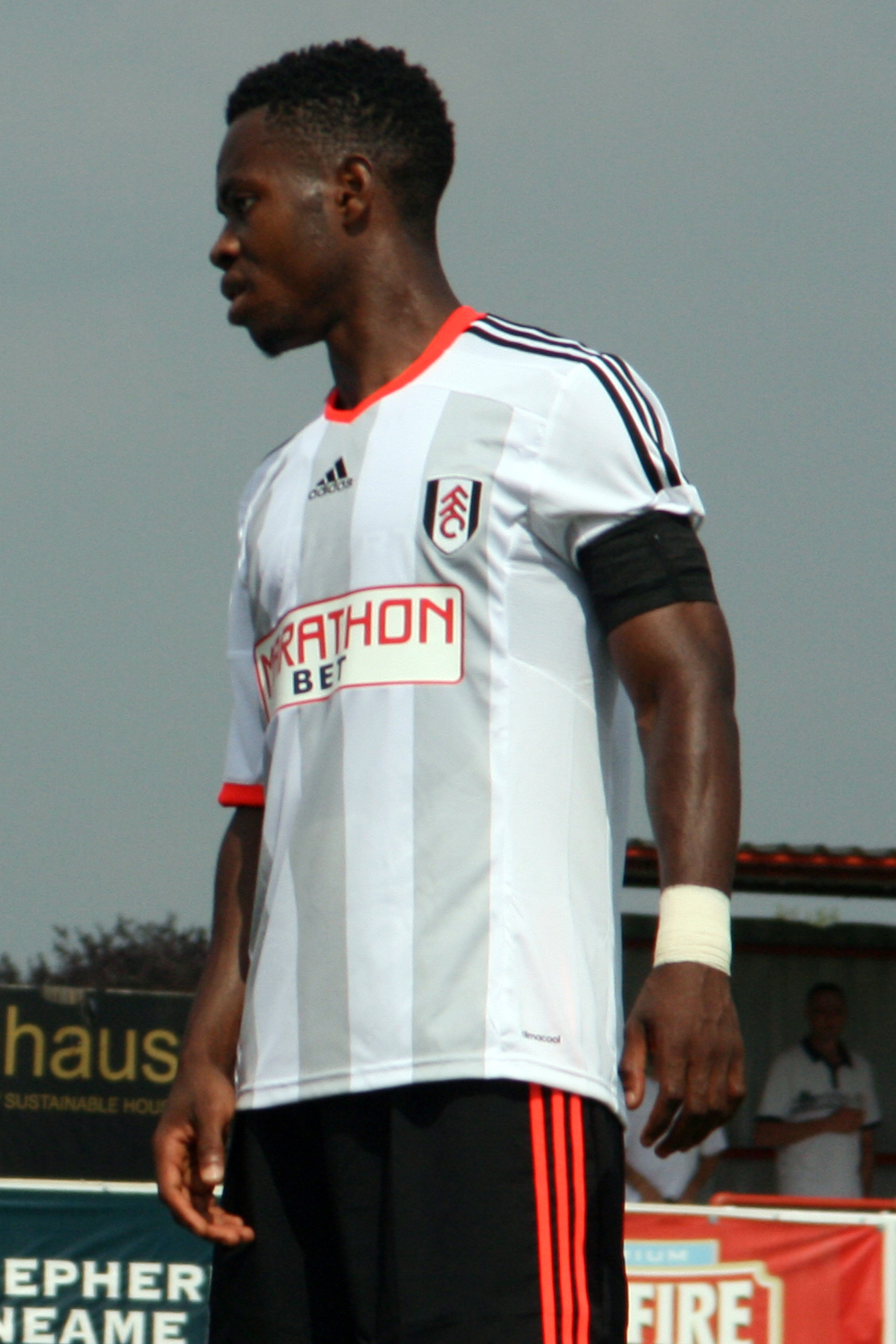
- Plumain playing for Fulham U21s in 2014

Personal information
- Date of birth: 2 March 1995 (age 31)
- Place of birth: Paris, France
- Height: 1.84 m (6 ft 0 in)
- Position: Winger

Team information
- Current team: Nea Salamina
- Number: 45

Youth career
- 2004–2008: Saint-Denis Cosmos
- 2008–2012: Lens

Senior career*
| Years | Team | Apps | (Gls) |
| 2012–2013 | Lens II | 15 | (0) |
| 2012–2013 | Lens | 20 | (1) |
| 2013–2016 | Fulham | 0 | (0) |
| 2015–2016 | → Red Star (loan) | 14 | (2) |
| 2016–2017 | Sedan | 21 | (2) |
| 2017–2018 | Quevilly-Rouen | 10 | (0) |
| 2017–2018 | Quevilly-Rouen II | 9 | (0) |
| 2018–2019 | Hapoel Hadera | 16 | (4) |
| 2019–2020 | Beitar Jerusalem | 42 | (11) |
| 2020–2021 | Samsunspor | 6 | (0) |
| 2021 | → Westerlo (loan) | 9 | (1) |
| 2022 | Rukh Lviv | 0 | (0) |
| 2022 | → Hapoel Tel Aviv (loan) | 10 | (2) |
| 2022–2023 | Sektzia Ness Ziona | 16 | (1) |
| 2023 | Bnei Sakhnin | 15 | (2) |
| 2023–2025 | Rukh Lviv | 25 | (3) |
| 2025– | Nea Salamina | 13 | (2) |

International career^{‡}
| 2010 | France U16 | 4 | (2) |
| 2012 | France U18 | 2 | (0) |
| 2022– | Guadeloupe | 16 | (7) |
- * Club domestic league appearances and goals as of 13:44, 10 May 2025 (UTC) ‡ National team caps and goals as of 19 November 2023

Ange-Freddy Plumain (born 2 March 1995) is a professional footballer who plays as a winger for Cypriot First Division club Nea Salamina. Born in mainland France, he plays for the Guadeloupe national team.

== Club career ==
=== Lens ===
On 5 October 2012, Plumain made his professional debut appearing as a substitute in a 1–0 victory over Niort.

=== Fulham ===
On 25 July 2013, Plumain signed a three-year contract with English side Fulham, with an option to extend for another year. He initially played for the club's Development team in the Professional Development League.

Plumain made his Fulham first-team debut in the FA Cup third round against Norwich City at Carrow Road, coming as a substitute for Alexander Kačaniklić for the second half of the game.

However, he was released at the end of his three-year contract in June 2016.

=== Red Star ===
Plumain joined Paris-based Ligue 2 side Red Star on a season-long loan, Fulham announced on 31 August 2015.

=== Sedan ===
After being released by Fulham in June 2016 Plumain joined Sedan.

== International career ==
Plumain was born in metropolitan France and is of Guadeloupean descent. He is a former youth international for France. He opted to play for the Guadeloupe national team in 2022.

== Career statistics ==
=== Club ===
As of 24 January 2023

Appearances and goals by club, season and competition
| Club | Season | League | | | Cup | | Europe | | Other | | Total | |
| Club | Season | Division | Apps | Goals | Apps | Goals | Apps | Goals | Apps | Goals | Apps | Goals |
|---|---|---|---|---|---|---|---|---|---|---|---|---|
| Lens II | 2012–13 | CFA | 15 | 0 | 0 | 0 | 0 | 0 | 0 | 0 | 15 | 0 |
| Lens II | Total | | 15 | 0 | 2 | 0 | 0 | 0 | 0 | 0 | 15 | 0 |
| Lens | 2012–13 | Ligue 2 | 20 | 1 | 3 | 0 | 0 | 0 | 0 | 0 | 23 | 1 |
| Lens | Total | | 20 | 1 | 3 | 0 | 0 | 0 | 0 | 0 | 23 | 1 |
| Fulham | 2013–14 | Premier League | 0 | 0 | 2 | 0 | 0 | 0 | 0 | 0 | 2 | 0 |
| Fulham | Total | | 0 | 0 | 2 | 0 | 0 | 0 | 0 | 0 | 2 | 0 |
| Red Star | 2015–16 | Ligue 2 | 14 | 2 | 0 | 0 | 0 | 0 | 0 | 0 | 14 | 2 |
| Red Star | Total | | 14 | 2 | 0 | 0 | 0 | 0 | 0 | 0 | 14 | 2 |
| Sedan | 2016–17 | Championnat National | 21 | 2 | 0 | 0 | 0 | 0 | 0 | 0 | 21 | 2 |
| Sedan | Total | | 21 | 2 | 0 | 0 | 0 | 0 | 0 | 0 | 21 | 2 |
| Quevilly-Rouen | 2017–18 | Ligue 2 | 10 | 0 | 0 | 0 | 0 | 0 | 1 | 0 | 11 | 0 |
| Quevilly-Rouen | Total | | 10 | 0 | 0 | 0 | 0 | 0 | 1 | 0 | 11 | 0 |
| Hapoel Hadera | 2018–19 | Israeli Premier League | 16 | 4 | 1 | 0 | 0 | 0 | 5 | 0 | 22 | 4 |
| Hapoel Hadera | Total | | 16 | 4 | 1 | 0 | 0 | 0 | 5 | 0 | 22 | 4 |
| Beitar Jerusalem | 2018–19 | Israeli Premier League | 15 | 5 | 0 | 0 | 0 | 0 | 0 | 0 | 15 | 5 |
| Beitar Jerusalem | 2019–20 | Israeli Premier League | 27 | 6 | 2 | 0 | 0 | 0 | 6 | 1 | 35 | 7 |
| Beitar Jerusalem | Total | | 42 | 11 | 2 | 0 | 0 | 0 | 6 | 1 | 50 | 12 |
| Samsunspor | 2020–21 | TFF First League | 6 | 0 | 1 | 0 | 0 | 0 | 0 | 0 | 7 | 0 |
| Samsunspor | Total | | 6 | 0 | 1 | 0 | 0 | 0 | 0 | 0 | 7 | 0 |
| Westerlo | 2020–21 | Belgian First Division B | 9 | 1 | 0 | 0 | 0 | 0 | 0 | 0 | 9 | 1 |
| Westerlo | Total | | 9 | 1 | 0 | 0 | 0 | 0 | 0 | 0 | 9 | 1 |
| Hapoel Tel Aviv | 2021–22 | Israeli Premier League | 10 | 2 | 0 | 0 | 0 | 0 | 0 | 0 | 10 | 2 |
| Hapoel Tel Aviv | Total | | 10 | 2 | 0 | 0 | 0 | 0 | 0 | 0 | 10 | 2 |
| Sektzia Ness Ziona | 2022–23 | Israeli Premier League | 16 | 1 | 1 | 0 | 0 | 0 | 4 | 2 | 21 | 3 |
| Sektzia Ness Ziona | Total | | 16 | 1 | 1 | 0 | 0 | 0 | 4 | 2 | 21 | 3 |
| Bnei Sakhnin | 2022–23 | Israeli Premier League | 0 | 0 | 0 | 0 | 0 | 0 | 0 | 0 | 0 | 0 |
| Bnei Sakhnin | Total | | 0 | 0 | 0 | 0 | 0 | 0 | 0 | 0 | 0 | 0 |
| Career total | | | 179 | 24 | 10 | 0 | 0 | 0 | 16 | 3 | 205 | 27 |

=== International ===
Scores and results list Guadeloupe's goal tally first.

List of international goals by Ange-Freddy Plumain
| No. | Date | Venue | Opponent | Score | Result | Competition |
|---|---|---|---|---|---|---|
| 1 | 1 July 2023 | Shell Energy Stadium, Houston, United States | Cuba | 2–0 | 4–1 | 2023 CONCACAF Gold Cup |
| 2 | 4 July 2023 | Red Bull Arena, Harrison, United States | Guatemala | 2–1 | 2–3 | 2023 CONCACAF Gold Cup |
| 3 | 10 September 2023 | Stade Valette, Sainte-Anne, Guadeloupe | Sint Maarten | 2–0 | 4–0 | 2023–24 CONCACAF Nations League B |
| 4 | 10 September 2023 | Stade Valette, Sainte-Anne, Guadeloupe | Sint Maarten | 4–0 | 4–0 | 2023–24 CONCACAF Nations League B |
| 5 | 15 October 2023 | Stade Valette, Sainte-Anne, Guadeloupe | Saint Lucia | 1–0 | 2–0 | 2023–24 CONCACAF Nations League B |
| 6 | 15 October 2023 | Stade Valette, Sainte-Anne, Guadeloupe | Saint Lucia | 2–0 | 2–0 | 2023–24 CONCACAF Nations League B |
| 7 | 17 November 2023 | Wildey Turf, Bridgetown, Barbados | Sint Maarten | 1–0 | 2–0 | 2023–24 CONCACAF Nations League B |
| 8 | 15 November 2024 | Truman Bodden Sports Complex, George Town, Cayman Islands | Cayman Islands | 3–0 | 6–0 | 2024–25 CONCACAF Nations League play-in |
| 9 | 24 June 2025 | Shell Energy Stadium, Houston, United States | Guatemala | 1–2 | 2–3 | 2025 CONCACAF Gold Cup |
