= Thierry Ambrose =

French footballer (born 1997)

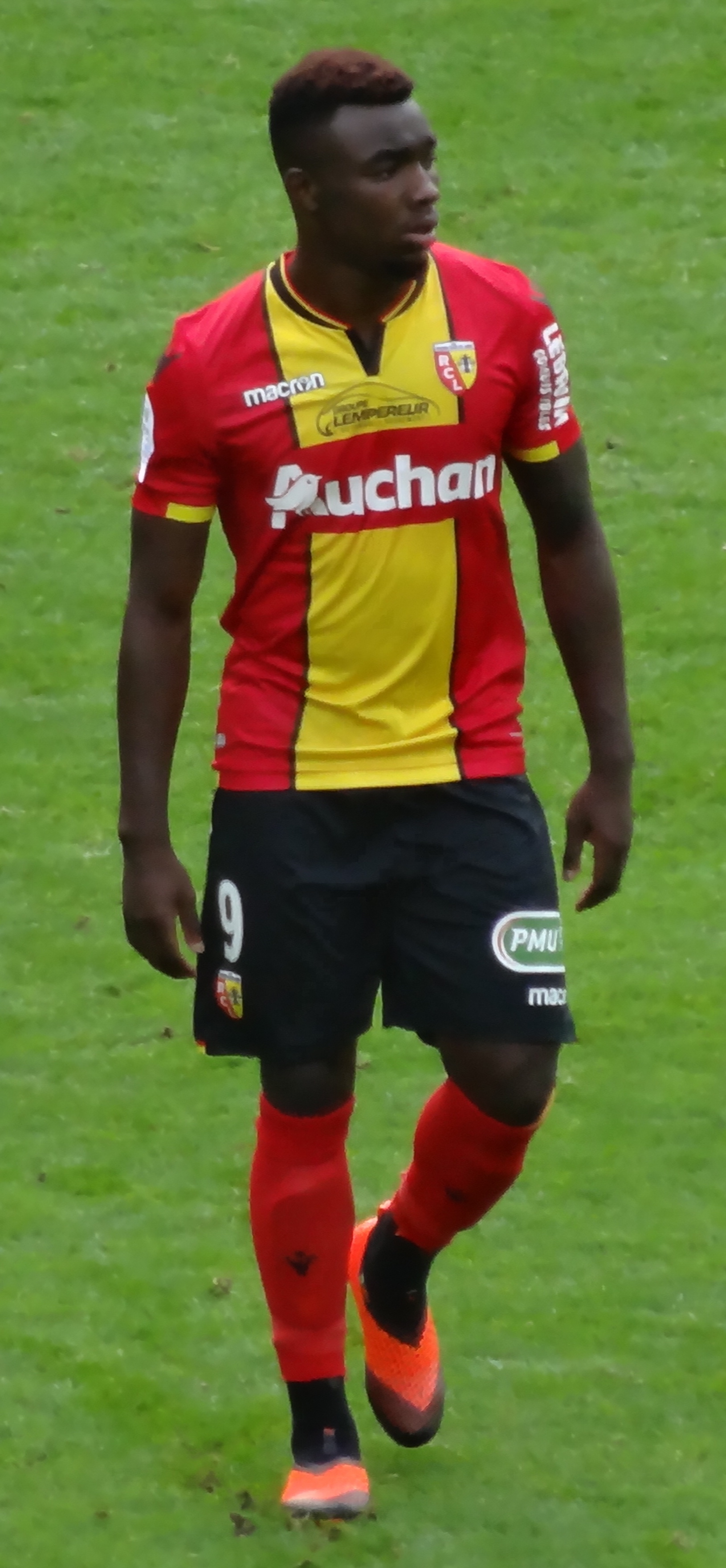
- Ambrose playing for Lens in 2018

Personal information
- Full name: Thierry Winston Jordan Ambrose
- Date of birth: 28 March 1997 (age 29)
- Place of birth: Sens, Yonne, France
- Height: 1.78 m (5 ft 10 in)
- Position: Forward

Team information
- Current team: Kortrijk
- Number: 68

Youth career
- 2003–2006: AS Gresivaudan
- 2006–2013: Auxerre
- 2013–2015: Manchester City

Senior career*
| Years | Team | Apps | (Gls) |
| 2015–2020 | Manchester City | 0 | (0) |
| 2017–2018 | → NAC Breda (loan) | 30 | (10) |
| 2018–2019 | → Lens (loan) | 32 | (4) |
| 2019–2020 | → Metz (loan) | 18 | (0) |
| 2020–2021 | Metz | 23 | (0) |
| 2021–2023 | KV Oostende | 61 | (13) |
| 2023– | Kortrijk | 71 | (24) |

International career^{‡}
| 2012–2013 | France U16 | 8 | (1) |
| 2013 | France U17 | 2 | (1) |
| 2014 | France U18 | 3 | (0) |
| 2015 | France U19 | 3 | (0) |
| 2022– | Guadeloupe | 20 | (6) |
- * Club domestic league appearances and goals as of 19 April 2026 ‡ National team caps and goals as of 24 June 2025

Thierry Winston Jordan Ambrose (born 28 March 1997) is a French professional footballer who plays as a forward for Belgian club Kortrijk. A former youth international for France, he plays for the Guadeloupe national team.

== Early life ==
Ambrose was born in Sens, Yonne.

== Club career ==
On 15 August 2023, Ambrose signed a four-year contract with Kortrijk. In his debut game for Kortrijk against Eupen 5 days later, he suffered an Achilles tendon rupture.

== International career ==
Ambrose is of Guadeloupean and Malagasy descent. He has been a youth international for France. He debuted for the Guadeloupe national team in a friendly 2–0 loss to Cape Verde on 23 March 2022.

== Career statistics ==
=== Club ===
As of match played 30 July 2020

Appearances and goals by club, season and competition
| Club | Season | League | | | National Cup | | League Cup | | Other | | Total | |
| Club | Season | Division | Apps | Goals | Apps | Goals | Apps | Goals | Apps | Goals | Apps | Goals |
|---|---|---|---|---|---|---|---|---|---|---|---|---|
| Manchester City | 2017–18 | Premier League | 0 | 0 | 0 | 0 | 0 | 0 | 0 | 0 | 0 | 0 |
| NAC Breda (loan) | 2017–18 | Eredivisie | 30 | 10 | 1 | 0 | — | | — | | 31 | 10 |
| Lens (loan) | 2018–19 | Ligue 2 | 32 | 4 | 1 | 0 | 2 | 0 | 4 | 1 | 40 | 5 |
| Metz (loan) | 2019–20 | Ligue 1 | 18 | 0 | 1 | 0 | 0 | 0 | — | | 19 | 0 |
| Career total | | | 80 | 14 | 3 | 0 | 2 | 0 | 4 | 1 | 89 | 14 |

=== International ===
Scores and results list Guadeloupe's goal tally first.

List of international goals by Thierry Ambrose
| No. | Date | Venue | Opponent | Score | Result | Competition |
|---|---|---|---|---|---|---|
| 1 | 26 March 2022 | Stade Robert Bobin, Bondoufle, France | Martinique | 2–2 | 3–4 | Friendly |
| 2 | 2 June 2022 | Stade René Serge Nabajoth, Les Abymes, Guadeloupe | Cuba | 2–1 | 2–1 | 2022–23 CONCACAF Nations League B |
| 3 | 10 June 2022 | Beausejour Stadium, Gros Islet, Saint Lucia | Barbados | 1–0 | 1–0 | 2022–23 CONCACAF Nations League B |
| 4 | 13 June 2022 | Stade René Serge Nabajoth, Les Abymes, Guadeloupe | Barbados | 1–0 | 2–1 | 2022–23 CONCACAF Nations League B |
| 5 | 27 June 2023 | BMO Field, Toronto, Canada | Canada | 1–0 | 2–2 | 2023 CONCACAF Gold Cup |
| 6 | 20 June 2025 | PayPal Park, San Jose, United States | Jamaica | 1–0 | 1–2 | 2025 CONCACAF Gold Cup |
