= Pedro Altán =

Guatemalan footballer (born 1997)

Personal information
- Full name: Pedro Manuel Alejandro Altán Hernández
- Date of birth: 4 June 1997 (age 29)
- Place of birth: Guatemala City, Guatemala
- Height: 1.65 m (5 ft 5 in)
- Position: Midfielder

Team information
- Current team: Municipal
- Number: 10

Youth career
- 2013–2015: Municipal

Senior career*
Years	Team	Apps	(Gls)
2015–	Municipal	170	(17)
2018–2020	→ Sanarate (loan)	60	(7)
2020–2021	→ Cobán Imperial (loan)	24	(5)

International career^{‡}
2016	Guatemala U20	1	(0)
2019	Guatemala U23	6	(0)
2019–	Guatemala	32	(3)
- * Club domestic league appearances and goals as of 18:55, 17 June 2025 (UTC) ‡ National team caps and goals as of 18:55, 17 June 2025 (UTC)

Pedro Manuel Alejandro Altán Hernández (born 4 June 1997) is a Guatemalan professional footballer who plays as midfielder for Liga Guate club Municipal and the Guatemala national team.

== Club career ==
A youth product of Municipal, Altán joined their academy at the age of 16. He debuted with their senior team on 20 September 2015. He helped Municipal win the 2016 Liga Nacional de Fútbol de Guatemala. From 2018 to 2020 he was on loan with Deportivo Sanarate, and in 2021 with Cobán Imperial. He again helped the team win the 2024 Liga Nacional de Fútbol de Guatemala Clausura tournament, and was given the number 10 by the club.

== International career ==
Altán made the Guatemala national team for the 2023 CONCACAF Gold Cup.

He was again called up for the 2025 CONCACAF Gold Cup.

== Honours ==
Municipal

- Liga Nacional de Fútbol de Guatemala: 2017 Clausura, 2024 Clausura
- Copa Campeón de Campeones: 2024
