= Olger Escobar =

Footballer (born 2006)

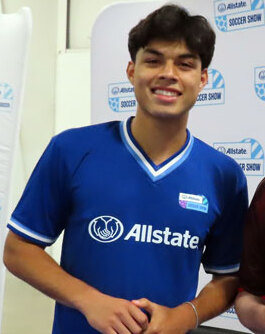
- Escobar in 2026

Personal information
- Full name: Olger Armando Escobar Real
- Date of birth: 11 September 2006 (age 20)
- Place of birth: Lynn, Massachusetts, United States
- Height: 1.72 m (5 ft 8 in)
- Positions: Midfielder; winger; striker

Team information
- Current team: CF Montréal
- Number: 29

Youth career
- 2018–2023: New England Revolution

Senior career*
Years	Team	Apps	(Gls)
2023–2025	New England Revolution II	31	(1)
2025–	CF Montréal	26	(1)

International career^{‡}
2023	Guatemala U17	5	(4)
2024	Guatemala U18	4	(3)
2023–2024	Guatemala U20	11	(6)
2023–	Guatemala	24	(4)
- * Club domestic league appearances and goals as of 20:00, 23 May 2026 (UTC) ‡ National team caps and goals as of 20:00, 5 October 2026 (UTC)

Olger Armando Escobar Real (born 11 September 2006) is a professional footballer who plays as an attacking midfielder or winger for Major League Soccer club CF Montréal. Born in the United States, he plays for the Guatemala national team.

== Club career ==
=== New England Revolution ===
Escobar started his career with American side New England Revolution II, a reserve team for Major League Soccer club New England Revolution. On 22 April 2023, he debuted for the club during a 0–1 loss to New York Red Bulls II. Later that year, on 20 October 2023, it was announced that Escobar would be named New England Revolution's Player of the Year for the 2022–23 MLS NEXT season.

=== CF Montréal ===
On 23 April 2025, CF Montréal acquired Escobar from New England Revolution, sending $125,000 in 2025 General Allocation Money (GAM) and $50,000 in conditional GAM. New England will retain a sell-on percentage of Escobar's future transfer.

== International career ==
=== Youth career ===
Escobar has represented Guatemala internationally. He played for the Guatemala national under-17 football team at the 2023 CONCACAF U-17 Championship, in which he scored 4 goals in 5 appearances.

In 2024, Escobar played with the Guatemala national under-18 football team at the UEFA Friendship Tournament U18 hosted in Turkey. He would score 3 goals in 4 appearances, helping Guatemala finish fifth place at the tournament. Later, that same year Escobar was called up to the Guatemala national under-20 football for the 2024 CONCACAF U-20 Championship.

On 27 July 2024, he would score a hat-trick in a 5–1 win against Haiti, helping Guatemala reach the Quarter-finals. 3 days later, in the Quarter-finals match against the United States, in the final minutes of the match Escobar missed a penalty to tie the game. Guatemala would lose 1–0 and fail to qualify for the 2025 FIFA U-20 World Cup.

=== Senior career ===
Olger Escobar received his first Guatemala senior call up in the month of November 2023 for a friendly match against Jamaica. On 11 November 2023, he made his debut against Jamaica, replacing Óscar Santis in a goalless draw.

On 5 June 2024, Olger Escobar would appear for a second time in a Guatemala 2026 FIFA World Cup qualification match against Dominica. In the match, he recorded an assist to José Martínez in a 6–0 win. That same year, on 1 September 2024 in a friendly against Uruguay, he would assist the equalizer goal in a 1–1 draw. He was praised for his performance by Guatemala's coach Luis Fernando Tena. He would score his debut senior goal on 16 March 2025 against Honduras in a 2–1 win.

Escobar was named to the squad for the 2025 CONCACAF Gold Cup. At the Gold Cup, Escobar scored Guatemala's only goal in a 2–1 loss to the United States in the semi-finals.

== Style of play ==
Escobar mainly operates as a midfielder, winger, or striker. He operated as a winger while playing for American side New England Revolution II and operated as a midfielder while playing for the Guatemala national under-17 football team.

== Personal life ==
Escobar is the son of Don Armando Escobar, a footballer who moved to the United States in hopes of having a career. He spent time as a student at the Clark Avenue Middle School in Chelsea, Massachusetts. He traces his heritage to Escuintla, Guatemala.

== Career statistics ==
=== Club ===
As of match played 16 July 2026

Appearances and goals by club, season and competition
Club	Season	League			National cup (Note: Includes Canadian Championship)		Continental		Other		Total	
Club	Season	Division	Apps	Goals	Apps	Goals	Apps	Goals	Apps	Goals	Apps	Goals
New England Revolution II	2023	MLS Next Pro	13	0	0	0	—		0	0	13	0
New England Revolution II	2024	MLS Next Pro	14	0	0	0	—		0	0	14	0
New England Revolution II	2025	MLS Next Pro	4	1	0	0	—		0	0	4	1
New England Revolution II	Total		31	1	0	0	0	0	0	0	31	1
CF Montréal	2025	MLS	13	1	0	0	—		3 (Note: Appearance(s) in Leagues Cup)	0	16	1
CF Montréal	2026	MLS	13	0	2	0	—		0	0	15	0
CF Montréal	Total		26	1	2	0	0	0	3	0	31	1
Career total			57	2	2	0	0	0	3	0	62	2

=== International ===
As of match played 5 October 2026

Appearances and goals by national team and year
National team	Year	Apps	Goals
Guatemala	2023	1	0
Guatemala	2024	4	0
Guatemala	2025	12	4
Guatemala	2026	7	0
Total		24	4

List of international goals scored by Olger Escobar
No.	Date	Venue	Cap	Opponent	Score	Result	Competition
1	16 March 2025	Chase Stadium, Fort Lauderdale, United States	6	Honduras	2–1	2–1	Friendly
2	24 June 2025	Shell Energy Stadium, Houston, United States	12	Guadeloupe	2–0	3–2	2025 CONCACAF Gold Cup
3	2 July 2025	Energizer Park, St. Louis, United States	14	United States	1–2	1–2	2025 CONCACAF Gold Cup
4	18 November 2025	Estadio El Trébol, Guatemala City, Guatemala	17	Suriname	2–0	3–1	2026 FIFA World Cup qualification

== Honours ==
Individual

- CONCACAF Gold Cup Best Young Player: 2025
