= Nicolás Samayoa =

Guatemalan footballer (born 1995)

Personal information
- Full name: Nicolás Samayoa Pacheco
- Date of birth: 2 August 1995 (age 31)
- Place of birth: Guatemala City, Guatemala
- Height: 1.85 m (6 ft 1 in)
- Position: Centre-back

Team information
- Current team: Municipal
- Number: 4

College career
Years	Team	Apps	(Gls)
2014–2017	Florida Gulf Coast Eagles	66	(6)

Senior career*
Years	Team	Apps	(Gls)
2018	New England Revolution	0	(0)
2018	→ Las Vegas Lights (loan)	2	(0)
2019–2023	Comunicaciones	115	(11)
2023–2025	Politehnica Iași	58	(1)
2025–	Municipal	0	(0)

International career^{‡}
2018–	Guatemala	41	(2)
- * Club domestic league appearances and goals as of 30 March 2025 ‡ National team caps and goals as of 2 August 2026

Nicolás Samayoa Pacheco (born 2 August 1995) is a Guatemalan professional footballer who plays as a centre-back for Liga Guate club Municipal and the Guatemala national team.

== Club career ==
=== Youth career ===
Samayoa also played four years of college soccer at Florida Gulf Coast University between 2014 and 2017. While at FGU, Samayoa made 66 appearances, scored 6 goals and tallied 4 assists.

=== New England Revolution ===
On 21 January 2018, Samayoa was drafted in the fourth round (78th overall) of the 2018 MLS SuperDraft by New England Revolution. He signed with the club on 9 February 2018.

Samayoa made his professional debut on 5 June 2018, in a 3–2 loss to Louisville City FC in a Lamar Hunt US Open Cup game.

On 11 June 2018, Samayoa joined United Soccer League side Las Vegas Lights on loan.

New England released Samayoa at the end of their 2018 season.

=== Comunicaciones ===
==== 2018–19: Debut season ====
On 1 January 2019, Samayoa returned to Guatemala and signed with Comunicaciones. Later that month, on 27 January, he made his debut for the club, coming on as a substitute at the 46th minute for Michael Umaña in a 2–0 win over Chiantla.

==== 2021–22: CONCACAF League title and La 31 ====
In the second leg of the round of 16 of the CONCACAF Champions League on 23 February 2022, Samayoa scored the seventh and final penalty against Colorado Rapids to send Comunicaciones into the quarter-finals.

=== Municipal ===
On 23 July 2025, it was confirmed that Samayoa had officially joined Municipal.

== International career ==
=== Youth ===
Samayoa has represented the Guatemala U20 and was selected by head coach Carlos Ruiz to participate in the 2015 CONCACAF U20 Championship, where he spent six games as an unused substitute.

=== Senior ===
He made his debut for Guatemala national football team on 15 November 2018 in a friendly against Israel which Guatemala lost 0–7.

== Career statistics ==
=== International ===
As of match played 8 June 2026

Appearances and goals by national team and year
National team	Year	Apps	Goals
Guatemala	2018	1	0
Guatemala	2019	–	
Guatemala	2020	–	
Guatemala	2021	–	
Guatemala	2022	2	0
Guatemala	2023	14	1
Guatemala	2024	8	0
Guatemala	2025	13	1
Guatemala	2026	3	0
Total		41	2

Scores and results list Guatemala's goal tally first, score column indicates score after each Samayoa goal.

List of international goals scored by Nicolás Samayoa
No.	Date	Venue	Opponent	Score	Result	Competition
1	27 March 2023	Estadio Doroteo Guamuch Flores, Guatemala City, Guatemala	French Guiana	3–0	4–0	2022–23 CONCACAF Nations League B
2.	6 June 2025	Estadio Doroteo Guamuch Flores, Guatemala City, Guatemala	Dominican Republic	2–2	4–2	2026 FIFA World Cup qualification

== Honours ==
Comunicaciones

- CONCACAF League: 2021
- Liga Nacional de Guatemala: Clausura 2022
