= José Morales (footballer, born 1996) =

Guatemalan footballer

Personal information
- Full name: Jose Alfredo Morales Concua
- Date of birth: 3 December 1996 (age 29)
- Place of birth: Guatemala City, Guatemala
- Height: 1.79 m (5 ft 10 in)
- Position: Left-back

Team information
- Current team: Municipal
- Number: 16

Youth career
- 2008–2017: Municipal

Senior career*
Years	Team	Apps	(Gls)
2017–2018	Municipal	2	(0)
2018–2019	Petapa	23	(3)
2019	Siquinalá	19	(0)
2020	Iztapa	12	(1)
2020–	Municipal	160	(11)

International career^{‡}
2021–	Guatemala	49	(3)
- * Club domestic league appearances and goals as of 17:04, 8 June 2024 (UTC) ‡ National team caps and goals as of 20:00, 10 October 2025 (UTC)

Jose Alfredo Morales Concua (born 3 December 1996), nicknamed El Caballo ("The Horse"), is a Guatemalan professional footballer who plays as a left-back for Liga Guate club Municipal and the Guatemala national team.

== Club career ==
A youth product of Municipal, Morales began his career with them before moving to Deportivo Petapa. He followed that with stints at Naranjeros Escuintla and Deportivo Iztapa, before returning to Municipal on 4 June 2020.

== International career ==
Morales was called up to represent the Guatemala national team at the 2021 CONCACAF Gold Cup. He debuted with Guatemala in a 2–0 Gold Cup loss to El Salvador on 12 July 2021.

== Career statistics ==
=== International goals ===
Scores and results list Guatemala's goal tally first.

No.	Date	Venue	Opponent	Score	Result	Competition
1.	8 September 2021	Estadio Pensativo, Antigua, Guatemala	Nicaragua	2–1	2–2	Friendly
2.	24 April 2022	PayPal Park, San Jose, United States	El Salvador	1–0	4–0	Friendly
3.	5 June 2024	Estadio Doroteo Guamuch Flores, Guatemala City, Guatemala	Dominica	6–0	6–0	2026 FIFA World Cup qualification

== Honours ==
Municipal

- Liga Nacional de Guatemala: Clausura 2024
