= Honduras national football team results (2020–present) =

Honduras
2020–29 season

This is a list of the Honduras national football team results from 2020 to 2029.

== 2020 ==
Honduras was scheduled to begin playing in 2020 in the CONCACAF Nations League Finals. However, the games were postponed until 2021 due to the COVID-19 pandemic.

29 March 2020 Friendly	Czech Republic	Cancelled	Honduras	Fort Lauderdale, United States
16:00 EST				Stadium: Inter Miami CF Stadium
Note: Cancelled due to COVID-19 pandemic.

10 October 2020 Friendly	Honduras	1–1	Nicaragua	Comayagua, Honduras
16:00 CST	Paz 90+2'		Chavarría 40'	Stadium: Estadio Carlos Miranda; Attendance: Closed gates Referee: Óscar Moncada (HON); Record: 20–3–1 (78:16)

15 November 2020 Friendly	Guatemala	2–1	Honduras	Guatemala City, Guatemala
11:00 CST	Lom 24', 66' (pen.)		López 68' (pen.)	Stadium: Estadio Doroteo Guamuch Flores; Attendance: Closed gates Referee: Mario Escobar (GUA); Record: 18–19–15 (60:61)

== 2021 ==
24 March 2021 Friendly	Belarus	1–1	Honduras	Zhodzina, Belarus
20:00 EET	Savitski 22'		López 45'	Stadium: Torpedo Stadium; Attendance: Closed gates Referee: Aleksei Matyunin (RUS); Record: 0–2–0 (3:3)

28 March 2021 Friendly	Greece	2–1	Honduras	Thessaloniki, Greece
17:00 EET	Pavlidis 14', 59'		Rodríguez 41'	Stadium: Toumba Stadium; Attendance: Closed gates Referee: Urs Schnyder (SUI); Record: 0–0–1 (1:2)

3 June 2021 CNL	Honduras	0–1	United States	Denver, United States
17:30			Siebatcheu 89'	Stadium: Empower Field at Mile High; Attendance: 34,451; Referee: Oshane Nation (JAM); Record: 5–8–17 (27:50)

6 June 2021 CNL	Honduras	2–2 (5–4 p)	Costa Rica	Denver, United States
16:30	Rodríguez 48'; Elis 80'		Campbell 8'; Calvo 85'	Stadium: Empower Field at Mile High; Attendance: 37,648; Referee: Reon Radix (GRN); Record: 19–23–24 (82:109)
	Penalties
	A. López (penalty scored); Elis (penalty scored); Benguché (penalty scored); Toro (penalty missed); Acosta (penalty scored); Alvarado (penalty scored)		(penalty scored) Venegas; (penalty scored) Calvo; (penalty missed) Lassiter; (penalty scored) Torres; (penalty scored) Mora; (penalty missed) Tejeda

12 June 2021 Friendly	Mexico	0–0	Honduras	Atlanta, United States
20:00				Stadium: Mercedes-Benz Stadium; Attendance: 70,072; Referee: Ted Unkel (USA); Record: 8–9–22 (34:70)

13 July 2021 Gold Cup	Honduras	4–0	Grenada	Houston, United States
22:10	Bengtson 28'; Solano 52'; Leverón 86'; Quioto 88'			Stadium: BBVA Stadium; Attendance: 10,625; Referee: Fernando Guerrero (MEX); Record: 3–0–0 (15:1)

17 July 2021 Gold Cup	Panama	2–3	Honduras	Houston, United States
20:30	Davis 32' (pen.); Yanis 45+1'		Quioto 22', 65'; López 61'	Stadium: BBVA Stadium; Referee: Bakary Gassama (GAM); Record: 27–11–11 (75:35)

20 July 2021 Gold Cup	Honduras	0–2	Qatar	Houston, United States
20:00			Ahmed 25'; Hatem 90+4'	Stadium: BBVA Stadium; Referee: Jair Marrufo (USA); Record: 0–0–1 (0:2)

24 July 2021 Gold Cup QF	Mexico	3–0	Honduras	Glendale, United States
22:00	Funes Mori 26'; Dos Santos 31'; Pineda 38'			Stadium: State Farm Stadium; Referee: Mario Escobar (GUA); Record: 8–9–23 (34:73)

2 September 2021 2022 FWCQ	Canada	1–1	Honduras	Toronto, Canada
20:05	Larin 66' (pen.)	Report	A. López 40' (pen.)	Stadium: BMO Field; Attendance: 14,822; Referee: Fernando Guerrero (MEX); Record: 11–7–7 (41:29)

5 September 2021 2022 FWCQ	El Salvador	0–0	Honduras	San Salvador, El Salvador
17:00		Report		Stadium: Estadio Cuscatlán; Attendance: 29,000; Referee: Walter López (GUA); Record: 37–20–18 (122:76)

8 September 2021 2022 FWCQ	Honduras	1–4	United States	San Pedro Sula, Honduras
20:05	Moya 27'	Report	Robinson 48'; Pepi 75'; Aaronson 86'; Lletget 90+3'	Stadium: Estadio Olímpico Metropolitano; Attendance: 31,000; Referee: Fernando Hernández Gómez (MEX); Record: 5–8–18 (28:54)

7 October 2021 2022 FWCQ	Honduras	0–0	Costa Rica	San Pedro Sula, Honduras
18:05		Report		Stadium: Estadio Olímpico Metropolitano; Attendance: 19,000; Referee: Mario Escobar (GUA); Record: 19–24–24 (82:109)

10 October 2021 2022 FWCQ	Mexico	3–0	Honduras	Mexico City, Mexico
18:00	Córdova 18'; Funes Mori 76'; Lozano 86'	Report		Stadium: Estadio Azteca; Attendance: 70,000; Referee: Ismail Elfath (USA); Record: 8–9–24 (34:76)

13 October 2021 2022 FWCQ	Honduras	0–2	Jamaica	San Pedro Sula, Honduras
18:05		Report	Roofe 38'; Fisher 79'	Stadium: Estadio Olímpico Metropolitano; Attendance: 18,000; Referee: Bryan López (GUA); Record: 12–5–9 (46:30)

12 November 2021 2022 FWCQ	Honduras	2–3	Panama	San Pedro Sula, Honduras
19:05	Elis 30'; Moya 59'	Report	Waterman 77'; Yanis 80'; Davis 85'	Stadium: Estadio Olímpico Metropolitano; Attendance: 10,000; Referee: Drew Fischer (CAN); Record: 27–11–12 (77:38)

16 November 2021 2022 FWCQ	Costa Rica	2–1	Honduras	San José, Costa Rica
19:05	Duarte 20'; Torres 90+5'	Report	Quioto 35'	Stadium: Estadio Nacional; Attendance: 5,000; Referee: Jair Marrufo (USA); Record: 19–24–25 (83:111)

== 2022 ==
16 January 2022 Friendly	Colombia	2–1	Honduras	Fort Lauderdale, United States
17:30 UTC−5	Quintero 10'; Colorado 67'	Report	Arriaga 52' (pen.)	Stadium: DRV PNK Stadium; Referee: David Gómez (Costa Rica); Record: 6–4–5 (14:13)

27 January 2022 2022 FWCQ	Honduras	0–2	Canada	San Pedro Sula, Honduras
19:05 UTC−6		Report	Maldonado 10' (o.g.); David 73'	Stadium: Estadio Olímpico Metropolitano; Attendance: 10,000; Referee: Daneon Parchment (Jamaica); Record: 11-7–8 (41:31)

30 January 2022 2022 FWCQ	Honduras	0–2	El Salvador	San Pedro Sula, Honduras
18:05 UTC−6		Report	Bonilla 35'; Cerén 90+2'	Stadium: Estadio Olímpico Metropolitano; Attendance: 3,000; Referee: Keylor Herrera (Costa Rica); Record: 38-21–18 (124:76)

2 February 2022 2022 FWCQ	United States	3–0	Honduras	Saint Paul, United States
19:30 UTC−6	McKennie 8'; Zimmerman 37'; Pulisic 67'	Report		Stadium: Allianz Field; Attendance: 19,202; Referee: Oshane Nation (Jamaica); Record: 5-8–19 (28:57)

24 March 2022 2022 FWCQ	Panama	1–1	Honduras	Panama City, Panama
20:05 UTC−5	Blackburn 23'	Report	K. López 65'	Stadium: Estadio Rommel Fernández; Referee: Ismail Elfath (United States); Record: 26-12–13 (76:41)

27 March 2022 2022 FWCQ	Honduras	0–1	Mexico	San Pedro Sula, Honduras
17:05 UTC−6		Report	Álvarez 70'	Stadium: Estadio Olímpico Metropolitano; Referee: Armando Villarreal (United States); Record: 8-10–27 (35:81)

30 March 2022 2022 FWCQ	Jamaica	2–1	Honduras	Kingston, Jamaica
20:05 UTC−5	Bailey 39' (pen.); Morrison 45+2'	Report	Tejeda 18' (pen.)	Stadium: Independence Park; Referee: Keylor Herrera (Costa Rica); Record: 12-5–10 (30:20)

3 June 2022 2022–23 CNL	Curaçao	0–1	Honduras	Willemstad, Curaçao
20:00 UTC−4		Report	Pinto 23'	Stadium: Ergilio Hato Stadium; Referee: Daneon Parchment (Jamaica); Record: 6-3–4 (25:22)

6 June 2022 2022–23 CNL	Honduras	1–2	Curaçao	San Pedro Sula, Honduras
20:00 UTC−6	Quioto 90+4'	Report	L. Bacuna 34'; Van den Hurk 82'	Stadium: Estadio Olímpico Metropolitano; Referee: Juan Gabriel Calderón (Costa Rica); Record: 6-3–5 (26:24)

13 June 2022 2022–23 CNL	Honduras	2–1	Canada	San Pedro Sula, Honduras
20:00 UTC−6	K. López 13'; Arriaga 78'	Report	David 86'	Stadium: Estadio Olímpico Metropolitano; Referee: Mario Escobar (Guatemala); Record: 12-7–8 (43:32)

23 September 2022 Friendly	Argentina	3–0	Honduras	Miami Gardens, United States
	Martínez 16'; Messi 45+2' (pen.), 69'	Report		Stadium: Hard Rock Stadium; Attendance: 64,420; Referee: Rubiel Vazquez (United States); Record: 0-0–3 (1:7)

27 September 2022 Friendly	Honduras	2–1	Guatemala	Houston, United States
20:00 UTC−5	Samayoa 70' (o.g.); Solano 87'	Report	Lom 32'	Stadium: PNC Stadium; Attendance: 15,000; Referee: Ismail Elfath (US)A; Record: 20-17–13 (60:56)

27 October 2022 Friendly	Qatar	1–0	Honduras	Marbella, Spain
10:30 UTC+2	Almoez 60'	Report		Stadium: Estadio Municipal de Marbella; Attendance: 0 Referee: Record: 0-0–2 (0:3)

30 October 2022 Friendly	Saudi Arabia	0–0	Honduras	Abu Dhabi, United Arab Emirates
18:30 UTC+4		Report		Stadium: Al Nahyan Stadium; Attendance: 0 Referee: Yahya Ali Al Mulla (UAE); Record: 0-1–0 (0:0)

== 2023 ==
22 March 2023 Friendly	El Salvador	0–1	Honduras	Los Angeles, United States
19:00 UTC−7		Report	Cartagena 34' (o.g.)	Stadium: BMO Stadium; Attendance: 16,000; Referee: Victor Rivas (USA); Record: 38–21–18 (124:76)

28 March 2023 2022–23 CNL	Canada	4–1	Honduras	Toronto, Canada
20:00 UTC−4		Report		Stadium: BMO Field; Attendance: 13,626; Referee: Ivan Barton (SLV); Record: 12–7–9 (44:36)

15 June 2023 Friendly	Venezuela	1–0	Honduras	Washington, D.C., United States
18:00 UTC−4	Soteldo 37'	Report		Stadium: Audi Field; Referee: Jaime Herrera (SLV); Record: 4–2–7 (15:15)

18 June 2023 Friendly	Barbados	Cancelled	Honduras	Baton Rouge, United States
		Report		Stadium: BREC Memorial Stadium
Note: Cancelled due to improper field conditions.

25 June 2023 2023 Gold Cup	Mexico	4–0	Honduras	Houston, United States
19:00 UTC−5	L. Romo 1', 23'; O. Pineda 52'; L. Chávez 64'	Report		Stadium: NRG Stadium; Attendance: 66,255; Referee: Mario Escobar (Guatemala); Record: 8–10–28 (35:85)

29 June 2023 2023 Gold Cup	Qatar	1–1	Honduras	Glendale, United States
16:45 UTC−7	T. Al-Abdullah 7'	Report	A. Elis 90+6'	Stadium: State Farm Stadium; Attendance: 34,517; Referee: Armando Villarreal (United States); Record: 0–1–2 (1:4)

2 July 2023 2023 Gold Cup	Honduras	2–1	Haiti	Charlotte, United States
21:00 UTC−4	J. Bengtson 42'; J.M. Pinto 59'	Report	F. Pierrot 20'	Stadium: Bank of America Stadium; Attendance: 47,382; Referee: Oshane Nation (Jamaica); Record: 13–0–5 (36:14)

3 September 2023 Friendly	Honduras	0–0	Guatemala	Fort Lauderdale, United States
18:00 UTC−4		Report		Stadium: DRV PNK Stadium; Referee: César Arturo Ramos (Mexico); Record: 20–18–13 (60:56)
Note: First match of Reinaldo Rueda's second tenure.

8 September 2023 2023-24 CNL	Jamaica	1–0	Honduras	Kingston, Jamaica
20:00 UTC−5	Gray 64'	Report		Stadium: Independence Park; Attendance: 3,800; Referee: Daniel Quintero (Mexico); Record: 12–5–11 (30:21)

12 September 2023 2023-24 CNL	Honduras	4–0	Grenada	Tegucigalpa, Honduras
20:10 UTC−6	Edwin Rodríguez 45+2', 65'; Anthony Lozano 51'; Luis Palma 60' (pen.)	Report		Stadium: Estadio Nacional Chelato Uclés; Referee: Iván Barton (El Salvador); Record: 4–0–0 (19:1)

12 October 2023 2023–24 CNL	Cuba	0–0	Honduras	Santo Domingo, Dominican Republic
21:00 UTC−4		Report		Stadium: Félix Sánchez Olympic Stadium (Note: Cuba played their home match against Honduras at the Félix Sánchez Olympic Stadium in Santo Domingo (Dominican Republic) instead of their regular stadium Estadio Antonio Maceo which did not meet CONCACAF requirements for hosting the match at night.); Referee: Walter López (Guatemala); Record: 8–3–5 (27:23)

15 October 2023 2023–24 CNL	Honduras	4–0	Cuba	Tegucigalpa, Honduras
18:00 UTC−6	Maldonado 9'; Lozano 13'; Quioto 67' (pen.); Róchez 90+1'	Report		Stadium: Estadio Nacional Chelato Uclés; Attendance: 10,899; Referee: Keylor Herrera (Costa Rica); Record: 9–3–5 (31:23)

17 November 2023 2023–24 CNL QF	Honduras	2–0	Mexico	Tegucigalpa, Honduras
20:00 UTC−6	Lozano 30'; Róchez 72'	Report		Stadium: Estadio Nacional Chelato Uclés; Attendance: 22,444; Referee: Juan Gabriel Calderón (Costa Rica); Record: 9–10–28 (37:85)

21 November 2023 2023–24 CNL QF	Mexico	2–0 (a.e.t.) (2–2 agg.) (4–2 p)	Honduras	Mexico City, Mexico
20:30 UTC−6	Chávez 43'; Álvarez 90+11'	Report		Stadium: Estadio Azteca; Attendance: 70,078; Referee: Iván Barton (El Salvador); Record: 9–10–29 (37:87)
	Penalties
	Giménez (penalty scored); Vásquez (penalty scored); Pineda (penalty scored); Huerta (penalty scored)		(penalty missed) Róchez; (penalty scored) Acosta; (penalty scored) Elis; (penalty missed) Najar
Note: Tied 2–2 on aggregate. Mexico won on penalties, advanced to the Finals and qualified for the 2024 Copa América. Honduras advanced to the play-in.

== 2024 ==
17 January 2024 Friendly	Honduras	0–2	Iceland	Fort Lauderdale, United States
20:00 UTC−5		Report	Willumsson 48' (pen.); Guðjohnsen 58'	Stadium: DRV PNK Stadium; Referee: Natalie Simon (United States); Record: 0–0–1 (0:2)

23 March 2024 2024 Copa América qualifying play-offs	Costa Rica	3–1	Honduras	Frisco, United States
18:15 UTC−5	Galo 12'; Madrigal 56'; Brenes 62'	Report	Chirinos 10'	Stadium: Toyota Stadium; Attendance: 15,299; Referee: Ismail Elfath (United States); Record: 19–24–26 (84:114)
Note: Costa Rica qualified for the 2024 Copa América after winning this game.

26 March 2024 Friendly	El Salvador	1–1	Honduras	Houston, United States
19:30 UTC−5	B. Gil 11'	Report	Róchez 62'	Stadium: Shell Energy Stadium; Referee: Rubiel Vazquez (United States); Record: 38–21–18 (124:76)

6 June 2024 2026 FIFA World Cup qualification	Honduras	3–1	Cuba	Tegucigalpa, Honduras
18:30 UTC−6	Lozano 26'; Rodríguez 45+2'; Castillo 82'	Report	Reyes 23'	Stadium: Estadio Nacional Chelato Uclés; Attendance: 10,111; Referee: Juan Calderón (Costa Rica); Record: 10–3–5 (34:24)

9 June 2024 2026 FIFA World Cup qualification	Bermuda	1–6	Honduras	Devonshire Parish, Bermuda
20:00 UTC−3	Lewis 45+4'	Report	Arriaga 14'; Ruiz 49'; Rodríguez 53'; L. Vega 56'; Najar 62'; Róchez 90+1'	Stadium: Bermuda National Stadium; Attendance: 1,021; Referee: Karen Hernández Andrade (Mexico); Record: 1–0–0 (6:1)

16 June 2024 Friendly	Ecuador	2–1	Honduras	East Hartford, United States
15:30 UTC−4	Sarmiento 8'; Hincapié 89'	Report	Róchez 29' (pen.)	Stadium: Pratt & Whitney Stadium at Rentschler Field; Referee: Ismael Cornejo (El Salvador)Record: 3–9–7 (18:24)

6 September 2024 2024–25 Nations League	Honduras	4–0	Trinidad and Tobago	Tegucigalpa, Honduras
20:00 UTC−6	A. López 39'; Arriaga 45+2'; Rodríguez 54'; Ruiz 86'	Report		Stadium: Estadio Nacional Chelato Uclés; Attendance: 7,481; Referee: Tori Penso (United States)Record: 12–6–3 (39:19)

10 September 2024 2024–25 Nations League	Honduras	1–2	Jamaica	Tegucigalpa, Honduras
20:00 UTC−6	Ruiz 50'	Report	Maldonado 49' (o.g.); Antonio 76' (pen.)	Stadium: Estadio Nacional Chelato Uclés; Referee: Victor Cáceres (Mexico)Record: 12–5–12 (48:35)

10 October 2024 2024–25 Nations League	French Guiana	2–3	Honduras	Remire-Montjoly, French Guiana
16:30 UTC−3	Galas 55'; Haabo 90+4'	Report	Lozano 45+1'; Flores 67'; Benguché 74'	Stadium: Stade Municipal Dr. Edmard Lama; Attendance: 204; Referee: Lukasz Szpala (United States); Record: 3–1–1 (10:5)

14 October 2024 2024–25 Nations League	Jamaica	0–0	Honduras	Kingston, Jamaica
20:00 UTC−5		Report		Stadium: Independence Park; Referee: Armando Villarreal (United States); Record: 12–6–12 (48:35)

15 November 2024 2024–25 Nations League QF	Honduras	2–0	Mexico	San Pedro Sula, Honduras
20:00 UTC−6	Palma 64', 83'	Report		Stadium: Estadio Francisco Morazán; Attendance: 12,866; Referee: Walter López (Guatemala); Record: 10–10–29 (39:87)

19 November 2024 2024–25 Nations League QF	Mexico	4–0 (4–2 agg.)	Honduras	Toluca, Mexico
20:30 UTC−6	Jiménez 42'; Martín 72', 90+7' (pen.); J. Sánchez 85'	Report		Stadium: Estadio Nemesio Díez; Attendance: 26,898; Referee: Drew Fischer (Canada); Record: 10–10–30 (39:91)
Note: Mexico won 4–2 on aggregate, advanced to the Finals and qualified for the 2025 Gold Cup. Honduras advanced to the 2025 Gold Cup qualification.

== 2025 ==
16 March 2025 Friendly	Honduras	1–2	Guatemala	Fort Lauderdale, United States
15:00 UTC−4	Hernández 26'	Report	Ardón 31'; Escobar 85'	Stadium: Chase Stadium; Referee: Luis Santander (Mexico); Record: 20–18–14 (61:58)

21 March 2025 2025 Gold Cup qualification	Bermuda	3–5	Honduras	Devonshire Parish, Bermuda
20:00 UTC−3	Crichlow 1'; Parfitt 44'; Lewis 90+2' (pen.)	Report	Quioto 60', 66'; Palma 64'; Martínez 89'; Pinto 90+4'	Stadium: Bermuda National Stadium; Referee: Reon Radix (Grenada); Record: 2–0–0 (11:4)

25 March 2025 2025 Gold Cup qualification	Honduras	2–0 (7–3 agg.)	Bermuda	Tegucigalpa, Honduras
20:00 UTC−6	Benguché 53'; Palma 57'	Report		Stadium: Estadio Nacional Chelato Uclés; Referee: Bryan López (Guatemala); Record: 3–0–0 (13:4)
Note: Honduras won 7–3 on aggregate and qualified for the Finals.

7 June 2025 2026 FIFA World Cup qualification	Cayman Islands	0–1	Honduras	George Town, Cayman Islands
15:00 UTC−5		Report	Robinson 86' (o.g.)	Stadium: Truman Bodden Sports Complex; Referee: Adonis Carrasco (Dominican Republic); Record: 1–0–0 (1:0)

10 June 2025 2026 FIFA World Cup qualification	Honduras	2–0	Antigua and Barbuda	Tegucigalpa, Honduras
20:00 UTC−6	Montes 49'; A. Vega 80'	Report		Stadium: Estadio Nacional Chelato Uclés; Attendance: 7,905; Referee: Waldir García (El Salvador); Record: 2–0–0 (3:0)

17 June 2025 2025 Gold Cup GS	Canada	6–0	Honduras	Vancouver, Canada
19:30 UTC−7	Sigur 27'; Oluwaseyi 45+2'; Buchanan 48', 65'; P. David 75'; Saliba 90'	Report		Stadium: BC Place; Attendance: 24,286; Referee: Mario Escobar (Guatemala); Record: 12–7–10 (44:42)

21 June 2025 2025 Gold Cup GS	Honduras	2–0	El Salvador	Houston, United States
21:00 UTC−5	Quioto 33'; Ramírez 90+5'	Report		Stadium: Shell Energy Stadium; Attendance: 20,536; Referee: Walter López (Guatemala); Record: 39–21–18 (126:76)

24 June 2025 2025 Gold Cup GS	Honduras	2–1	Curaçao	San Jose, United States
19:00 UTC−7	Álvarez 32'; Palma 90+1'	Report	Menjívar 42' (o.g.)	Stadium: PayPal Park; Attendance: 10,935; Referee: Oshane Nation (Jamaica); Record: 7–3–5 (28:25)

28 June 2025 2025 Gold Cup QF	Panama	1–1 (4–5 p)	Honduras	Glendale, United States
16:15 UTC−7	Díaz 45+1' (pen.)	Report	Lozano 82'	Stadium: State Farm Stadium; Attendance: 45,255; Referee: Katia García (Mexico); Record: 26–13–13 (77:42)
	Penalties
	Escobar (penalty scored); Díaz (penalty scored); Godoy (penalty missed); Harvey (penalty scored); Davis (penalty scored); Guerrero (penalty missed)		(penalty scored) Palma; (penalty scored) Arriaga; (penalty scored) Rosales; (penalty scored) Maldonado; (penalty missed) Lozano; (penalty scored) Pineda

2 July 2025 2025 Gold Cup SF	Mexico	1–0	Honduras	Santa Clara, United States
19:00 UTC−7	Jiménez 50'	Report		Stadium: Levi's Stadium; Attendance: 70,975; Referee: Juan Calderón (Costa Rica); Record: 10–10–31 (39:92)

5 September 2025 2026 FIFA World Cup qualification	Haiti	0–0	Honduras	Willemstad, Curaçao
20:00 UTC−4		Report		Stadium: Ergilio Hato Stadium; Attendance: 2,997; Referee: Pierre-Luc Lauzière (Canada); Record: 13–1–5 (36:14)

9 September 2025 2026 FIFA World Cup qualification	Honduras	2–0	Nicaragua	Tegucigalpa, Honduras
20:00 UTC−6	Quioto 47'; A. Vega 90+1'	Report		Stadium: Estadio Nacional Chelato Uclés; Attendance: 11,000; Referee: Armando Villarreal (United States); Record: 22–3–1 (82:16)

9 October 2025 2026 FIFA World Cup qualification	Honduras	0–0	Costa Rica	San Pedro Sula, Honduras
20:00 UTC−6		Report		Stadium: Estadio General Francisco Morazán; Attendance: 15,109; Referee: Walter López (Guatemala); Record: 19-25–26 (84:114)

13 October 2025 2026 FIFA World Cup qualification	Honduras	3–0	Haiti	Tegucigalpa, Honduras
18:00 UTC−6	Rivas 18'; Lozano 26'; Quioto 40'	Report		Stadium: Estadio Nacional Chelato Uclés; Attendance: 15,675; Referee: Oshane Nation (Jamaica); Record: 14–1–5 (39:14)

13 November 2025 2026 FIFA World Cup qualification	Nicaragua	2–0	Honduras	Managua, Nicaragua
20:00 UTC−6	Hernández 12'; Moreno 82'	Report		Stadium: Estadio Nacional; Attendance: 9,893; Referee: Ismail Elfath (United States); Record: 22–3–2 (82:18)

18 November 2025 2026 FIFA World Cup qualification	Costa Rica	0–0	Honduras	San José, Costa Rica
19:00 UTC−6		Report		Stadium: Estadio Nacional; Attendance: 33,456; Referee: Drew Fischer (Canada); Record: 19–26–26 (84:114)

== 2026 ==
31 March 2026 Friendly	Peru	2–2	Honduras	Leganés, Spain
21:00 UTC+2	Vélez 6', 58'	Report	Palma 44'; Mencía 90+4'	Stadium: Butarque Stadium; Attendance: 12,454; Referee: Guillermo Cuadra Fernández (Spain); Record: 2–6–2 (12:12)
Note: First match of José Molina's tenure.

6 June 2026 Friendly	Argentina	2–0	Honduras	College Station, United States
19:00 UTC−5	L. Martínez 37' (pen.); Simeone 54'	Report		Stadium: Kyle Field; Attendance: 91,102; Referee: Victor Rivas (United States); Record: 0–0–4 (1:9)

25 September 2026 2026–27 Nations League	Honduras	2–3	Suriname	Tegucigalpa, Honduras
19:00 UTC−5	Moncada 20'; Róchez 23'	Report	Lonwijk 18'; Jubitana 39'; Palma 66' (o.g.)	Stadium: Estadio Nacional Chelato Uclés; Attendance: 8,707; Referee: Fernando Hernández (Mexico); Record: 1–2–1 (6:6)

28 September 2026 2026–27 Nations League	Jamaica	0–1	Honduras	Kingston, Jamaica
19:00 UTC−5		Report	Figueroa 14'	Stadium: Independence Park; Attendance: 3,173; Referee: Juan Gabriel Calderón (Costa Rica); Record: 13–6–12 (49:35)

2 October 2026 2026–27 Nations League	Martinique	2–1	Honduras	Fort-de-France, Martinique
20:00 UTC−4	Varane 40'; Mexique 88'	Report	Puerto 8'	Stadium: Stade Pierre-Aliker; Attendance: 1,325; Referee: Kwinsi Williams (Trinidad and Tobago); Record: 2–1–1 (7:5)

5 October 2026 2026–27 Nations League	Honduras	1–1	Jamaica	Tegucigalpa, Honduras
20:00 UTC−6	Palma 51'	Report	Campbell 27'	Stadium: Estadio Nacional Chelato Uclés; Attendance: 9,574; Referee: Marco Ortíz (Mexico); Record: 13–7–12 (50:36)

13 November 2026 Friendly	United Arab Emirates	3–1	Honduras	Abu Dhabi, United Arab Emirates
18:15 UTC+4	Al Hammadi 33'; Bruno 48'; Juma 87'	Report	Toro 52'	Stadium: Mohammed bin Zayed Stadium; Referee: Ahmad Al-Ali (Kuwait)

17 November 2026 Friendly	Kuwait	0–2	Honduras	Kuwait City, Kuwait
19:30 UTC+3		Report	Rosales 21'; Moncada 37'	Stadium: Al-Sadaqua Walsalam Stadium; Referee: Mohamed Al-Mazyed (Qatar)

See also: FIFA International Match Calendar

== Record ==
Record does not include matches against clubs or teams not affiliated to FIFA.

As of 5 October 2026

Description	W	D	L	GF	GA
2020s record	24	20	36	95	101
All-time record	274	183	235	1,006	877
