= Bermuda national football team results (2020–present) =

This article provides details of international football games played by the Bermuda national football team from 2020 to present.

== Results ==
Win Draw Loss Fixture

=== 2020 ===
11 March Friendly	Jamaica	2–0	Bermuda	Montego Bay, Jamaica
	Fletcher 42'; Beckford 79'	Report		Stadium: Montego Bay Sports Complex; Referee: Rubiel Vazquez (United States)

=== 2021 ===
5 March Friendly	Bahamas	0–3	Bermuda	Bradenton, United States
		Report	28' (pen.) Lewis; 50' Russell; Coddington	Stadium: IMG Academy Stadium

7 March Friendly	Bahamas	0–0	Bermuda	Bradenton, United States
		Report		Stadium: IMG Academy Stadium

25 March 2022 FIFA World Cup qualification	Canada	5–1	Bermuda	Orlando, United States
	Larin 19', 27', 69'; Laryea 53'; Corbeanu 81'	Report	63' Crichlow	Stadium: Exploria Stadium; Attendance: 0 Referee: Armando Villarreal (United States)

30 March 2022 FIFA World Cup qualification	Aruba	0–5	Bermuda	Bradenton, United States
		Report	36', 80' Crichlow; 40' Bather; 57' Leverock; 64' Scott	Stadium: IMG Academy Stadium; Attendance: 29; Referee: Jaime Herrera Bonilla (El Salvador)

4 June 2022 FIFA World Cup qualification	Suriname	6–0	Bermuda	Paramaribo, Suriname
	Becker 3', 36'; Hasselbaink 15', 37', 65'; Pinas 74'	Report		Stadium: Dr. Ir. Franklin Essed Stadion; Attendance: 0 Referee: Mario Escobar (Guatemala)

8 June 2022 FIFA World Cup qualification	Cayman Islands	1–1	Bermuda	Bradenton, United States
	Ebanks 23'	Report	65' Hall	Stadium: IMG Academy Stadium; Attendance: 22; Referee: Rubiel Vazquez (United States)

2 July 2021 CONCACAF Gold Cup qualification	Barbados	1–8	Bermuda	Fort Lauderdale, United States
	Holligan 45+1'	Report	1', 14', 87' (pen.) Wells; 29' Lambe; 39' Leverock; 60' (o.g.) Pearce; 66' Crichlow; 67' Lewis	Stadium: DRV PNK Stadium; Attendance: 2,025; Referee: Drew Fischer (Canada)

6 July 2021 CONCACAF Gold Cup qualification	Haiti	4–1	Bermuda	Fort Lauderdale, United States
	Pierrot 23', 28', 34'; Nazon 87' (pen.)	Report	80' Wells	Stadium: DRV PNK Stadium; Attendance: 3,448; Referee: Iván Barton (El Salvador)

=== 2022 ===
4 June 2022–23 CNL B	Bermuda	0–0	Haiti	Devonshire Parish, Bermuda
		Report		Stadium: Bermuda National Stadium; Referee: Reon Radix (Grenada)

7 June 2022–23 CNL B	Guyana	2–1	Bermuda	Leonora, Guyana
	Bobb 35'; Glasgow 45+2'	Report	42' Leverock	Stadium: National Track and Field Centre Leonora; Referee: Reon Radix (Grenada)

11 June 2022–23 CNL B	Montserrat	3–2	Bermuda	Santo Domingo, Dominican Republic
	Taylor 47' (pen.), 85'; Clifton 67'	Report	54' Clemons; 78' Wells	Stadium: Félix Sánchez Olympic Stadium; Referee: Adonis Carrasco (Dominican Republic)

14 June 2022–23 CNL B	Bermuda	3–0 (Note: The Bermuda v Montserrat match, scheduled for 14 June 2022, was cancelled due to Montserrat deciding to withdraw from the match. The match was later awarded to Bermuda as a 3–0 win.)	Montserrat	Devonshire Parish, Bermuda
				Stadium: Bermuda National Stadium; Referee: Drew Fischer (Canada)

=== 2023 ===
25 March 2022–23 CNL B	Bermuda	0–2	Guyana	Devonshire Parish, Bermuda
		Report	52' Gordon; 58' Garrett	Stadium: Bermuda National Stadium; Referee: Fernando Hernández (Mexico)

28 March 2022–23 CNL B	Haiti	3–1	Bermuda	San Cristóbal, Dominican Republic
	Pierrot 25', 26'; Antoine 45+4'	Report	75' Bean	Stadium: Estadio Panamericano; Referee: Melvin Matamoros (Honduras)

8 September 2023–24 CNL B	Bermuda	0–0	French Guiana	Devonshire Parish, Bermuda
		Report		Stadium: Bermuda National Stadium; Referee: Jefferson Escobar (Honduras)

12 September 2023–24 CNL B	Saint Vincent and the Grenadines	4–3	Bermuda	Kingstown, Saint Vincent and the Grenadines
	Anderson 40', 42', 45+2'; Sutherland 63'	Report	21' Bean; 69' Coddington; 74' Simmons	Stadium: Arnos Vale Stadium; Referee: Joseph Dickerson (United States)

13 October 2023–24 CNL B	Belize	0-1	Bermuda	Belmopan, Belize
		Report	Crichlow 18'	Stadium: FFB Stadium; Attendance: 842; Referee: Juan Gabriel Calderón (Costa Rica)

17 October 2023–24 CNL B	Bermuda	1-1	Belize	Devonshire Parish, Bermuda
	Crichlow 37'	Report	75' (pen.) Reneau	Stadium: Bermuda National Stadium; Attendance: 818; Referee: David Gómez (Costa Rica)

17 November 2023–24 CNL B	Bermuda	3-1	Saint Vincent and the Grenadines	Devonshire Parish, Bermuda
	Tucker 6'; Crichlow 44'; Parfitt-Williams 50'	Report	34' McBurnette	Stadium: Bermuda National Stadium; Referee: Jaime Herrera (El Salvador)

21 November 2023–24 CNL B	French Guiana	3-0	Bermuda	Remire-Montjoly, French Guiana
	Ajaiso 29'; Baal 49'; Sarrucco 90+4'	Report		Stadium: Stade Municipal Dr. Edmard Lama; Referee: José Torres (Puerto Rico)

=== 2024 ===
22 March 2024 FIFA Series	Bermuda	2–0	Brunei	Jeddah, Saudi Arabia
22:00 UTC+3	Todd 82'; Parfitt-Williams 88'	Report		Stadium: King Abdullah Sports City; Referee: Qasim Matar Al-Hatmi (Oman)

25 March 2024 FIFA Series	Guinea	5–1	Bermuda	Jeddah, Saudi Arabia
22:00 UTC+3	Sylla 11'; Bangoura 48'; Diawara 51'; Keita 61'; Kané 70'	Report	15' Bean	Stadium: King Abdullah Sports City; Referee: Sami Ahmed Al-Jurays (Saudi Arabia)

5 June 2026 FIFA World Cup qualification	Antigua and Barbuda	1–1	Bermuda	Piggotts, Antigua and Barbuda
15:00 UTC−4	Deterville 26'	Report	90' Ming	Stadium: ABFA Technical Centre; Attendance: 404; Referee: Adonis Carrasco (Dominican Republic)

9 June 2026 FIFA World Cup qualification	Bermuda	1–6	Honduras	Devonshire Parish, Bermuda
20:00 UTC−4	Lewis 45+4' (pen.)	Report	14' Arriaga; 49' Ruiz; 53' Rodríguez; 56' Vega; 62' Najar; 90+1' Róchez	Stadium: Bermuda National Stadium; Referee: Karen Hernández Andrade (Mexico)

7 September 2024–25 CONCACAF Nations League B	Bermuda	2–3	Dominican Republic	Piggotts, Antigua and Barbuda
11:00 UTC−4	Crichlow 17'; Lambe 51'	Report	35' Romero; 62' Mörschel; 84' Vásquez	Stadium: ABFA Technical Center; Referee: Sanchez Bass (St.Kitts and Nevis)

10 September 2024–25 CONCACAF Nations League B	Antigua and Barbuda	0–1	Bermuda	Piggotts, Antigua and Barbuda
16:00 UTC−4		Report	56' Crichlow	Stadium: ABFA Technical Center; Referee: Tristley Bassue (St. Kitts and Nevis)

12 October 2024–25 CONCACAF Nations League B	Dominica	1–6	Bermuda	Devonshire Parish, Bermuda
19:30 UTC−3	Joseph 61'	Report	9', 18', 26' (pen.) Wells; 49' Lewis; 85' Scott; 90' Bean	Stadium: Bermuda National Stadium; Referee: Fernando Morón (Panama)

15 October 2024–25 CONCACAF Nations League B	Bermuda	3–2	Dominica	Devonshire Parish, Bermuda
19:30 UTC−3	Bredas 37' (o.g.); Hall 45'; Bean 68'	Report	51' Jules; 59' Laville	Stadium: Bermuda National Stadium; Referee: Josué Ugalde (Costa Rica)

16 November 2024–25 CONCACAF Nations League B	Bermuda	2–1	Antigua and Barbuda	Santiago de los Caballeros, Dominican Republic
15:00 UTC−4	Drew 8' (o.g.); Lambe 48'	Report	69' Massicot	Stadium: Estadio Cibao FC; Referee: Timothy Derry (Trinidad and Tobago)

19 November 2024–25 CONCACAF Nations League B	Dominican Republic	6–1	Bermuda	Santiago de los Caballeros, Dominican Republic
18:00 UTC−4	Romero 33', 69', 90', 90+4'; López 75'; Mörschel 87'	Report	45+2' Parfitt-Williams	Stadium: Estadio Cibao FC; Referee: José García Meléndez (El Salvador)

=== 2025 ===
21 March 2025 CONCACAF Gold Cup qualification	Bermuda	3–5	Honduras	Devonshire Parish, Bermuda
20:00 UTC−3	Crichlow 1'; Parfitt-Williams 44'; Lewis 90+2' (pen.)	Report	60', 66' Quioto; 64' Palma; 89' Martínez; 90+4' José Pinto	Stadium: Bermuda National Stadium; Attendance: 545; Referee: Reon Radix (Grenada)

25 March 2025 CONCACAF Gold Cup qualification	Honduras	2–0	Bermuda	Tegucigalpa, Honduras
	Benguché 53'; Palma 57'	Report		Stadium: Estadio Nacional Chelato Uclés; Attendance: 0 Referee: Bryan López (Guatemala)

4 June 2026 FIFA World Cup qualification	Bermuda	5–0	Cayman Islands	Devonshire Parish, Bermuda
20:00 UTC−3	Lewis 12' (pen.); Parfitt-Williams 54'; Hall 64'; Lambe 79'; Carpenter 84'	Report		Stadium: Bermuda National Stadium; Referee: Rubiel Vazquez (United States)

10 June 2026 FIFA World Cup qualification	Cuba	1–2	Bermuda	Santiago de Cuba, Cuba
16:00 UTC−4	Aguirre 58'	Report	6' Parfitt-Williams; 74' Lambe	Stadium: Estadio Antonio Maceo; Attendance: 3,600; Referee: Oliver Vergara (Panama)

5 September 2026 FIFA World Cup qualification	Bermuda	0-4	Jamaica	Devonshire Parish, Bermuda
19:00 UTC−3		Report	4' Lowe; 26' Cephas; 58' Palmer; 90' Nicholson	Stadium: Bermuda National Stadium; Attendance: 4,100; Referee: Keylor Herrera (Costa Rica)

9 September 2026 FIFA World Cup qualification	Curaçao	3–2	Bermuda	Willemstad, Curaçao
20:00 UTC−4	Chong 14', 26'; Noslin 75'	Report	35' Crichlow; 42' Parfitt-Williams	Stadium: Ergilio Hato Stadium; Attendance: 9,474; Referee: Adonis Carrasco (Dominican Republic)

10 October 2026 FIFA World Cup qualification	Bermuda	0–3	Trinidad and Tobago	Devonshire Parish, Bermuda
19:00 UTC−3		Report	10' Sealy; 30' Spicer; 49' Henry	Stadium: Bermuda National Stadium; Attendance: 2,900; Referee: Julio Luna (Guatemala)

14 October 2026 FIFA World Cup qualification	Jamaica	4–0	Bermuda	Kingston, Jamaica
19:00 UTC−5	Leverock 24' (o.g.); De Cordova-Reid 26'; Nicholson 35'; Richards 76'	Report		Stadium: Independence Park; Referee: Reon Radix (Grenada)

13 November 2026 FIFA World Cup qualification	Bermuda	0–7	Curaçao	Devonshire Parish, Bermuda
20:00 UTC−3		Report	6' (pen.) L. Bacuna; 32' J. Bacuna; 48' (pen.), 63' Paulina; 59' Hansen; 82' Martha; 90+2' van Eijma	Stadium: Bermuda National Stadium; Referee: Tori Penso (United States)

18 November 2026 FIFA World Cup qualification	Trinidad and Tobago	2–2	Bermuda	Port of Spain, Trinidad and Tobago
21:00 UTC−4	Henry 9'; James 66'	Report	60' Tucker; 65' Parfitt	Stadium: Hasely Crawford Stadium; Referee: Jose Raúl Torres Rivera (Puerto Rico)

=== 2026 ===
25 March Friendly	DR Congo	2–0	Bermuda	Guadalajara, Mexico
15:00 UTC−6	Mayele 45'; Wissa 51' (pen.)	Report		Stadium: Estadio Akron

6 June Friendly	Cape Verde	3–0	Bermuda	East Hartford, Connecticut, United States
16:00 UTC−4	Semedo 33'; Rodrigues 49'; da Costa 90+1'	Report		Stadium: Pratt & Whitney Stadium at Rentschler Field

25 September 2026–27 CONCACAF Nations League	Bermuda	1–2	Guadeloupe	Gros Islet, Saint Lucia
15:00 UTC−4	Russell 18' (pen.)	Report	Vulgaire 84' Boisne 89'	Stadium: Daren Sammy Cricket Ground

28 September 2026–27 CONCACAF Nations League	Saint Lucia	5–2	Bermuda	Gros Islet, Saint Lucia
20:00 UTC−4	Caull 15', 18', 35' Byron 53' Fredrick 68'	Report	Burchall 45+1' Robinson 70'	Stadium: Daren Sammy Cricket Ground

2 October 2026–27 CONCACAF Nations League	Barbados	4–1	Bermuda	Wildey, Barbados
20:00 UTC−4	Gale 26', 41'; Applewhaite 29'; Reid-Stephen 86'	Report	Parfitt-Williams 8'	Stadium: Wildey Turf; Attendance: 1,100; Referee: Eric de la Cruz (Cuba)

5 October 2026–27 CONCACAF Nations League	Bermuda	1–2	Barbados	Wildey, Barbados
20:00 UTC−4	Parfitt-Williams 75'	Report	Gale 79', 82'	Stadium: Wildey Turf; Attendance: 591; Referee: Sergio Rozenhaut (Suriname)
