= 2025 CONCACAF Gold Cup Group B =

Football competition

Group B of the 2025 CONCACAF Gold Cup consisted of Canada, Curaçao, El Salvador and Honduras. Teams in this group played from June 17 to 24, 2025. The top two teams, Canada and Honduras, advanced to the quarter-finals, while the other two teams were eliminated.

== Standings ==
Pos	Team	Pld	W	D	L	GF	GA	GD	Pts	Qualification
1	Canada (H)	3	2	1	0	9	1	+8	7	Advance to knockout stage
2	Honduras	3	2	0	1	4	7	−3	6	Advance to knockout stage
3	Curaçao	3	0	2	1	2	3	−1	2	
4	El Salvador	3	0	1	2	0	4	−4	1	

Source: CONCACAF
Rules for classification: Tiebreakers
(H) Co-host

In the quarter-finals:

- The winners of Group B, Canada, advanced to play the runners-up of Group C, Guatemala.
- The runners-up of Group B, Honduras, advanced to play the winners of Group C, Panama.

== Matches ==
=== Curaçao vs El Salvador ===
June 17, 2025
20:15 (17:15 UTC−7)

Curaçao	0–0	El Salvador
	Report

PayPal Park, San Jose
Attendance: 13,042
Referee: Katia García (Mexico)

Curaçao	El Salvador

GK	1	Eloy Room
RB	3	Juriën Gaari
CB	2	Cuco Martina
CB	4	Roshon van Eijma
LB	5	Sherel Floranus
CM	8	Livano Comenencia		(substituted off) 84'
CM	10	Leandro Bacuna (c)	(yellow card) 2'
RW	16	Jearl Margaritha		(substituted off) 84'
AM	7	Juninho Bacuna	(yellow card) 40'
LW	14	Kenji Gorré		(substituted off) 73'
CF	19	Gervane Kastaneer		(substituted off) 73'
Substitutions:
FW	9	Jürgen Locadia		(substituted on) 73'
FW	11	Jeremy Antonisse		(substituted on) 73'
FW	17	Brandley Kuwas		(substituted on) 84'
MF	6	Godfried Roemeratoe		(substituted on) 84'
Manager:
(Netherlands) Dick Advocaat

GK	1	Mario González
RB	21	Bryan Tamacas
CB	2	Julio Sibrián (c)
CB	4	Jorge Cruz
LB	5	Diego Flores
DM	23	Melvin Cartagena	(yellow card) 36'
RM	25	Elvin Alvarado		(substituted off) 73'
CM	8	Bryan Landaverde		(substituted off) 73'
CM	20	Harold Osorio		(substituted off) 73'
LM	17	Jairo Henríquez
CF	9	Brayan Gil	(yellow card) 45+1'	(substituted off) 76'
Substitutions:
DF	26	Mauricio Cerritos		(substituted on) 73'
MF	7	Darwin Cerén		(substituted on) 73'
MF	10	Enrico Dueñas		(substituted on) 73'
FW	19	Emerson Mauricio		(substituted on) 76'
Manager:
(Colombia) Hernán Darío Gómez

Player of the Match:
Mario González (El Salvador)

Assistant referees:
Sandra Ramírez (Mexico)
Karen Díaz (Mexico)
Fourth official:
Ekaterina Koroleva (United States)
Video assistant referee:
Dilia Bradley (Guatemala)
Assistant video assistant referee:
Óscar Macías (Mexico)

=== Canada vs Honduras ===
June 17, 2025
22:30 (19:30 UTC−7)

Canada	6–0	Honduras
Sigur 27'; Oluwaseyi 45+2'; Buchanan 48', 65'; P. David 75'; Saliba 90'	Report

BC Place, Vancouver
Attendance: 24,286
Referee: Mario Escobar (Guatemala)

Canada	Honduras

GK	1	Dayne St. Clair
RB	23	Niko Sigur
CB	15	Luc de Fougerolles	(substituted off) 63'
CB	5	Joel Waterman
LB	22	Richie Laryea	(substituted off) 63'
RM	17	Tajon Buchanan	(substituted off) 80'
CM	19	Nathan Saliba
CM	6	Mathieu Choinière
LM	20	Ali Ahmed
CF	12	Tani Oluwaseyi	(substituted off) 71'
CF	10	Jonathan David (c)	(substituted off) 63'
Substitutions:
DF	4	Kamal Miller	(substituted on) 63'
DF	3	Zorhan Bassong	(substituted on) 63'
FW	9	Cyle Larin	(substituted on) 63'
FW	24	Promise David	(substituted on) 71'
MF	14	Jacob Shaffelburg	(substituted on) 80'
Assistant manager:
Mauro Biello (Note: Mauro Biello replaced manager Jesse Marsch who was suspended for the first and second match.)

GK	1	Edrick Menjívar
RB	6	Cristopher Meléndez	(substituted off) 67'
CB	15	Getsel Montes
CB	4	Luis Vega
LB	8	Joseph Rosales
DM	20	Deiby Flores
RM	17	Luis Palma	(substituted off) 46'
CM	14	Alexy Vega	(substituted off) 46'
CM	5	Kervin Arriaga
LM	12	Romell Quioto	(substituted off) 81'
CF	9	Anthony Lozano (c)	(substituted off) 67'
Substitutions:
MF	23	Jorge Álvarez	(substituted on) 46'
MF	13	Carlos Mejía	(substituted on) 46'
DF	26	Luís Crisanto	(substituted on) 67'
FW	11	Jorge Benguché	(substituted on) 67'
FW	21	Yustin Arboleda	(substituted on) 81'
Manager:
(Colombia) Reinaldo Rueda

Player of the Match:
Tajon Buchanan (Canada)

Assistant referees:
Luis Ventura (Guatemala)
Humberto Panjoj (Guatemala)
Fourth official:
José Torres (Puerto Rico)
Video assistant referee:
Luis Enrique Santander (Mexico)
Assistant video assistant referee:
Diego Ojer (Guatemala)

=== Curaçao vs Canada ===
June 21, 2025
19:00 (18:00 UTC−5)

Curaçao	1–1	Canada
Antonisse 90+4'	Report	Saliba 9'

Shell Energy Stadium, Houston
Attendance: 20,536
Referee: Juan Gabriel Calderón (Costa Rica)

Curaçao	Canada

GK	1	Eloy Room
RB	20	Joshua Brenet
CB	3	Juriën Gaari		(substituted off) 87'
CB	4	Roshon van Eijma
LB	5	Sherel Floranus	(yellow card) 57'
CM	8	Livano Comenencia
CM	10	Leandro Bacuna (c)	(yellow card) 8'	(substituted off) 60'
RW	16	Jearl Margaritha		(substituted off) 59'
AM	7	Juninho Bacuna	(yellow card) 71'
LW	14	Kenji Gorré		(substituted off) 75'
CF	9	Jürgen Locadia
Substitutions:
FW	11	Jeremy Antonisse		(substituted on) 59'
MF	6	Godfried Roemeratoe		(substituted on) 60'
FW	13	Joshua Zimmerman		(substituted on) 75'
FW	19	Gervane Kastaneer		(substituted on) 87'
Manager:
(Netherlands) Dick Advocaat

GK	1	Dayne St. Clair
RB	23	Niko Sigur		(substituted off) 70'
CB	5	Joel Waterman
CB	4	Kamal Miller	(yellow card) 50'
LB	3	Zorhan Bassong
CM	19	Nathan Saliba
CM	8	Ismaël Koné		(substituted off) 70'
RW	25	Jayden Nelson		(substituted off) 56'
AM	10	Jonathan David (c)
LW	14	Jacob Shaffelburg		(substituted off) 89'
CF	12	Tani Oluwaseyi
Substitutions:
MF	20	Ali Ahmed		(substituted on) 56' (substituted off) 70'
DF	2	Alistair Johnston		(substituted on) 70'
MF	17	Tajon Buchanan		(substituted on) 70'
MF	6	Mathieu Choinière		(substituted on) 70'
FW	9	Cyle Larin		(substituted on) 89'
Assistant manager:
Mauro Biello

Player of the Match:
Jeremy Antonisse (Curaçao)

Assistant referees:
Juan Carlos Mora (Costa Rica)
William Arrieta (Costa Rica)
Fourth official:
Steffon Dewar (Jamaica)
Video assistant referee:
Daneon Parchment (Jamaica)
Assistant video assistant referee:
Benjamín Pineda (Costa Rica)

=== Honduras vs El Salvador ===
June 21, 2025
22:00 (21:00 UTC−5)

Honduras	2–0	El Salvador
Quioto 33'; Ramírez 90+5'	Report

Shell Energy Stadium, Houston
Attendance: 20,536
Referee: Walter López (Guatemala)

Honduras	El Salvador

GK	1	Edrick Menjívar	(yellow card) 90+1'
RB	26	Luís Crisanto
CB	2	Denil Maldonado (c)
CB	3	Julián Martínez
LB	8	Joseph Rosales		(substituted off) 80'
CM	5	Kervin Arriaga
CM	20	Deiby Flores
RW	16	Edwin Rodríguez		(substituted off) 68'
AM	23	Jorge Álvarez		(substituted off) 80'
LW	12	Romell Quioto		(substituted off) 90'
CF	11	Jorge Benguché		(substituted off) 68'
Substitutions:
FW	18	Dixon Ramírez		(substituted on) 68'
FW	21	Yustin Arboleda		(substituted on) 68'
DF	4	Luis Vega		(substituted on) 80'
MF	19	Carlos Pineda		(substituted on) 80'
MF	17	Luis Palma		(substituted on) 90'
Manager:
(Colombia) Reinaldo Rueda

GK	1	Mario González
RB	21	Bryan Tamacas		(substituted off) 46'
CB	2	Julio Sibrián (c)
CB	4	Jorge Cruz	(yellow card) 38'
LB	5	Diego Flores
RM	17	Jairo Henríquez		(substituted off) 77'
CM	8	Bryan Landaverde		(substituted off) 69'
CM	23	Melvin Cartagena		(substituted off) 46'
LM	10	Enrico Dueñas
CF	9	Brayan Gil
CF	20	Harold Osorio		(substituted off) 65'
Substitutions:
MF	7	Darwin Cerén		(substituted on) 46'
MF	15	Jefferson Valladares		(substituted on) 46'
FW	19	Emerson Mauricio		(substituted on) 65'
DF	26	Mauricio Cerritos		(substituted on) 69'
FW	14	Rafael Tejada		(substituted on) 77'
Manager:
(Colombia) Hernán Darío Gómez

Player of the Match:
Romell Quioto (Honduras)

Assistant referees:
Keytzel Corrales (Nicaragua)
Raymundo Feliz (Dominican Republic)
Fourth official:
José Torres (Puerto Rico)
Video assistant referee:
Diego Ojer (Guatemala)
Assistant video assistant referee:
Edvin Jurisevic (United States)

=== Honduras vs Curaçao ===
June 24, 2025
22:00 (19:00 UTC−7)

Honduras	2–1	Curaçao
Álvarez 32'; Palma 90+1'	Report	Menjívar 42' (o.g.)

PayPal Park, San Jose
Attendance: 10,935
Referee: Oshane Nation (Jamaica)

Honduras	Curaçao

GK	1	Edrick Menjívar
RB	26	Luís Crisanto
CB	2	Denil Maldonado (c)
CB	3	Julián Martínez
LB	8	Joseph Rosales
CM	5	Kervin Arriaga
CM	20	Deiby Flores
RW	16	Edwin Rodríguez		(substituted off) 59'
AM	23	Jorge Álvarez		(substituted off) 76'
LW	12	Romell Quioto		(substituted off) 88'
CF	11	Jorge Benguché		(substituted off) 59'
Substitutions:
MF	17	Luis Palma	(yellow card) 90'	(substituted on) 59'
FW	9	Anthony Lozano		(substituted on) 59'
MF	19	Carlos Pineda		(substituted on) 76'
FW	18	Dixon Ramírez		(substituted on) 88'
Manager:
(Colombia) Reinaldo Rueda

GK	1	Eloy Room (c)
RB	20	Joshua Brenet
CB	3	Juriën Gaari	(yellow card) 7'	(substituted off) 86'
CB	4	Roshon van Eijma
LB	5	Sherel Floranus
CM	8	Livano Comenencia
CM	6	Godfried Roemeratoe	(yellow card) 66'
RW	16	Jearl Margaritha		(substituted off) 73'
AM	11	Jeremy Antonisse	(yellow card) 50'
LW	14	Kenji Gorré		(substituted off) 80'
CF	9	Jürgen Locadia
Substitutions:
FW	19	Gervane Kastaneer		(substituted on) 73'
FW	13	Joshua Zimmerman	(yellow card) 81'	(substituted on) 80'
FW	17	Brandley Kuwas		(substituted on) 86'
Manager:
(Netherlands) Dick Advocaat

Player of the Match:
Jorge Álvarez (Honduras)

Assistant referees:
Caleb Wales (Trinidad and Tobago)
Ojay Duhaney (Jamaica)
Fourth official:
Steffon Dewar (Jamaica)
Video assistant referee:
Daneon Parchment (Jamaica)
Assistant video assistant referee:
Yasith Monge (Costa Rica)

=== Canada vs El Salvador ===
June 24, 2025
22:00 (21:00 UTC−5)

Canada	2–0	El Salvador
J. David 53'; Buchanan 56'	Report

Shell Energy Stadium, Houston
Attendance: 19,417
Referee: Joe Dickerson (United States)

Canada	El Salvador

GK	16	Maxime Crépeau
RB	2	Alistair Johnston		(substituted off) 57'
CB	15	Luc de Fougerolles	(yellow card) 25'	(substituted off) 77'
CB	13	Derek Cornelius		(substituted off) 57'
LB	22	Richie Laryea
RM	17	Tajon Buchanan
CM	23	Niko Sigur
CM	6	Mathieu Choinière
LM	14	Jacob Shaffelburg
CF	10	Jonathan David (c)		(substituted off) 57'
CF	24	Promise David	(yellow card) 59'	(substituted off) 62'
Substitutions:
DF	5	Joel Waterman		(substituted on) 57'
MF	8	Ismaël Koné		(substituted on) 57'
FW	11	Daniel Jebbison		(substituted on) 57'
FW	9	Cyle Larin		(substituted on) 62'
DF	26	Jamie Knight-Lebel		(substituted on) 77'
Manager:
(United States) Jesse Marsch

GK	1	Mario González
RB	15	Jefferson Valladares
CB	16	Henry Romero
CB	3	Roberto Domínguez	(yellow card) 20'
LB	5	Diego Flores
DM	26	Mauricio Cerritos		(substituted off) 88'
RM	12	Santos Ortíz	(yellow card) 16' (yellow-red card) 35'
CM	7	Darwin Cerén (c)		(substituted off) 61'
CM	20	Harold Osorio		(substituted off) 60'
LM	17	Jairo Henríquez	(red card) 45+9'
CF	19	Emerson Mauricio	(yellow card) 58'	(substituted off) 60'
Substitutions:
DF	2	Julio Sibrián		(substituted on) 60'
MF	8	Bryan Landaverde		(substituted on) 60'
FW	14	Rafael Tejada		(substituted on) 61'
MF	11	Josué Rivera		(substituted on) 88'
Manager:
(Colombia) Hernán Darío Gómez

Player of the Match:
Jonathan David (Canada)

Assistant referees:
Cameron Blanchard (United States)
Logan Brown (United States)
Fourth official:
Katja Koroleva (United States)
Video assistant referee:
Allen Chapman (United States)
Assistant video assistant referee:
Óscar Mejía (Mexico)

== Discipline ==
Fair play points would have been used as tiebreakers if the overall and head-to-head records of teams were tied. These were calculated based on yellow and red cards received in all group matches as follows:

- first yellow card: −1 point;
- indirect red card (second yellow card): −3 points;
- direct red card: −4 points;
- yellow card and direct red card: −5 points;

Only three of the above deductions were applied to a player in a single match.

Team	Match 1				Match 2				Match 3				Points
Team	Booked	(yellow card) (yellow-red card)	Sent off (straight red)	(yellow card) (red card)	Booked	(yellow card) (yellow-red card)	Sent off (straight red)	(yellow card) (red card)	Booked	(yellow card) (yellow-red card)	Sent off (straight red)	(yellow card) (red card)	Points
Honduras					1				1				–2
Canada					1				2				–3
Curaçao	2				3				4				–9
El Salvador	2				1				2	1	1		–12
