= Alexis Gamboa =

Costa Rican football player (born 1999)

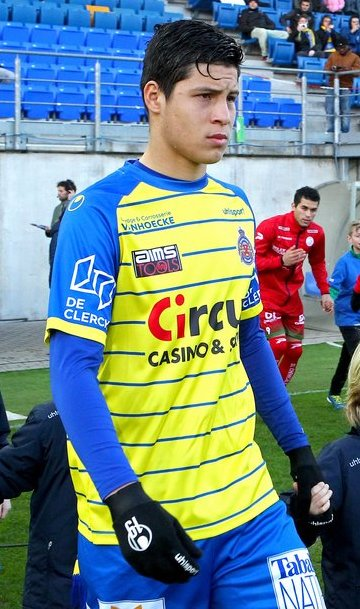
- Gamboa with Waasland-Beveren in 2019

Personal information
- Full name: Alexis Yohaslin Gamboa Rojas
- Date of birth: 20 March 1999 (age 27)
- Place of birth: Pococí, Costa Rica
- Height: 1.91 m (6 ft 3 in)
- Position: Centre-back

Team information
- Current team: Alajuelense
- Number: 13

Senior career*
Years	Team	Apps	(Gls)
2017–2018	Santos de Guápiles	26	(1)
2019–2021	Waasland-Beveren	19	(0)
2021	→ Alajuelense (loan)	10	(1)
2021–	Alajuelense	178	(6)

International career^{‡}
2017–2019	Costa Rica U20	6	(1)
2021	Costa Rica U23	2	(0)
2023–	Costa Rica	13	(1)
- * Club domestic league appearances and goals as of 3 November 2025 ‡ National team caps and goals as of 18 November 2025

Alexis Yohaslin Gamboa Rojas (born 20 March 1999) is a Costa Rican professional footballer who plays as a centre-back for Liga FPD club Alajuelense and the Costa Rica national team.

== Career statistics ==
=== International ===
As of match played 18 November 2025

Appearances and goals by national team and year
National team	Year	Apps	Goals
Costa Rica	2023	2	0
Costa Rica	2024	2	0
Costa Rica	2025	9	1
Total		13	1

Scores and results list Costa Rica's goal tally first.

List of internarional goals scored by Damion Lowe
No.	Date	Venue	Opponent	Score	Result	Competition
1.	6 September 2025	Nicaragua National Football Stadium, Managua, Nicaragua	Nicaragua	1–0	1–1	2026 FIFA World Cup qualification
