= Jorge Álvarez (Honduran footballer) =

Honduran footballer (born 1998)

Personal information
- Full name: Jorge Daniel Álvarez Rodas
- Date of birth: 28 January 1998 (age 28)
- Place of birth: Tegucigalpa, Honduras
- Height: 1.69 m (5 ft 7 in)
- Position: Midfielder

Team information
- Current team: Olimpia
- Number: 23

Youth career
- Olimpia

Senior career*
Years	Team	Apps	(Gls)
2017–	Olimpia	245	(21)
2018–2019	→ Lobos UPNFM (loan)	14	(1)

International career^{‡}
2019–2021	Honduras U23	4	(1)
2019–	Honduras	41	(2)
Medal record
Representing Honduras
Men's football
Pan American Games
Silver medal – second place	2019 Lima	Team competition
- * Club domestic league appearances and goals as of 02:00, 20 November 2024 (UTC) ‡ National team caps and goals as of 04:01, 25 June 2025 (UTC)

Jorge Daniel Álvarez Rodas (born 28 January 1998) is a Honduran professional footballer who plays as a midfielder for Olimpia and the Honduras national team.

== International career ==
=== International goals ===
Scores and results list Honduras' goal tally first.

No.	Date	Venue	Opponent	Score	Result	Competition
1.	25 June 2019	Banc of California Stadium, Los Angeles, United States	El Salvador	1–0	4–0	2019 CONCACAF Gold Cup
2.	24 June 2025	PayPal Park, San Jose, United States	Curaçao	1–0	2–1	2025 CONCACAF Gold Cup

== Honours ==
Honduras Youth

- Pan American Silver Medal: 2019
