= 2026 FIFA World Cup qualification – CONCACAF third round =

International football competition

Tournament details
- Dates: 4 September – 18 November 2025
- Teams: 12 (from 1 confederation)

Tournament statistics
- Matches played: 36
- Goals scored: 89 (2.47 per match)
- Attendance: 506,236 (14,062 per match)
- Top scorer: (Haiti) Duckens Nazon (4 goals)

The third round of CONCACAF matches of 2026 FIFA World Cup qualification took place during September, October, and November 2025. This round determined the final three CONCACAF teams to directly qualify for the 2026 FIFA World Cup as well as the two CONCACAF representatives in the inter-confederation play-offs.

== Format ==
As Canada, Mexico, and the United States qualified for the final tournament as hosts, they did not take part in the qualification tournament. Twelve teams – the second round group winners and runners-up – were drawn into three groups of four teams each playing a home-and-away league format. The group winners qualified for the 2026 FIFA World Cup and the two best group runners-up advanced to the inter-confederation play-offs.

== Qualified teams ==
The following teams finished first or second in their respective second round groups:

- Bermuda
- Costa Rica
- Curaçao
- El Salvador
- Guatemala
- Haiti
- Honduras
- Jamaica
- Nicaragua
- Panama
- Suriname
- Trinidad and Tobago

== Seeding ==
The draw took place at 19:00 EDT (UTC–4:00) on 12 June 2025. Teams were seeded based on the FIFA Men's World Ranking of June 2025 (April 2025 rankings shown in parentheses). The draw started with Pot 1; the first team drawn was placed into position A1, the second team drawn into position B1, and the third team drawn into position C1. The process was repeated with Pots 2, 3, and 4.

From the April 2025 FIFA Men's World Ranking
Pot 1	Pot 2	Pot 3	Pot 4
1. Panama (33); 2. Costa Rica (54); 3. Jamaica (63)	4. Honduras (75); 5. El Salvador (81); 6. Curaçao (90)	7. Haiti (83); 8. Trinidad and Tobago (100); 9. Guatemala (106)	10. Nicaragua (133); 11. Suriname (137); 12. Bermuda (168)

== Schedule ==
Matches took place in September, October, and November 2025.

Matchday	Date(s)	Fixtures
Matchday 1	4–5 September 2025	3 v 2, 4 v 1
Matchday 2	8–9 September 2025	1 v 3, 2 v 4
Matchday 3	9–10 October 2025	2 v 1, 4 v 3
Matchday 4	13–14 October 2025	1 v 4, 2 v 3
Matchday 5	13 November 2025	3 v 1, 4 v 2
Matchday 6	18 November 2025	1 v 2, 3 v 4

== Groups ==
=== Group A ===
Pos	Team	Pld	W	D	L	GF	GA	GD	Pts	Qualification	(Panama)	(Suriname)	(Guatemala)	(El Salvador)
1	Panama	6	3	3	0	9	4	+5	12	2026 FIFA World Cup	—	1–1	1–1	3–0
2	Suriname	6	2	3	1	9	6	+3	9	Inter-confederation play-offs	0–0	—	1–1	4–0
3	Guatemala	6	2	2	2	8	7	+1	8		2–3	3–1	—	0–1
4	El Salvador	6	1	0	5	2	11	−9	3		0–1	1–2	0–1	—

Source: FIFA
Rules for classification: Tiebreakers
4 September 2025
18:30 UTC−3

Suriname	0–0	Panama
	Report (FIFA); Report (CONCACAF)

Franklin Essed Stadion, Paramaribo
Attendance: 2,685
Referee: Kwinsi Williams (Trinidad and Tobago)
4 September 2025
20:00 UTC−6

Guatemala	0–1	El Salvador
	Report (FIFA); Report (CONCACAF)	Osorio 79'

Estadio Cementos Progreso, Guatemala City
Attendance: 13,600
Referee: Juan Gabriel Calderón (Costa Rica)

8 September 2025
18:30 UTC−6

El Salvador	1–2	Suriname
Dijksteel 73' (o.g.)	Report (FIFA); Report (CONCACAF)	Balker 12'; Klas 81'

Estadio Cuscatlán, San Salvador
Attendance: 28,186
Referee: Adonai González (Mexico)
8 September 2025
20:30 UTC−5

Panama	1–1	Guatemala
Harvey 37'	Report (FIFA); Report (CONCACAF)	Santis 35'

Estadio Rommel Fernández, Panama City
Attendance: 23,207
Referee: Saíd Martínez (Honduras)

10 October 2025
18:00 UTC−3

Suriname	1–1	Guatemala
Misidjan 90+4'	Report (FIFA); Report (CONCACAF)	Lom 75'

Franklin Essed Stadion, Paramaribo
Attendance: 3,476
Referee: Fernando Hernández (Mexico)
10 October 2025
19:00 UTC−6

El Salvador	0–1	Panama
	Report (FIFA); Report (CONCACAF)	Fajardo 55'

Estadio Cuscatlán, San Salvador
Attendance: 22,805
Referee: Drew Fischer (Canada)

14 October 2025
20:00 UTC−5

Panama	1–1	Suriname
Díaz 90+6'	Report	Margaret 21'

Estadio Rommel Fernández, Panama City
Attendance: 21,862
Referee: Selvin Brown (Honduras)
14 October 2025
20:00 UTC−6

El Salvador	0–1	Guatemala
	Report	Santis 46'

Estadio Cuscatlán, San Salvador
Attendance: 26,931
Referee: Pierre-Luc Lauzière (Canada)

13 November 2025
19:00 UTC−3

Suriname	4–0	El Salvador
Chery 44' (pen.); Margaret 74', 76'; Klas 83'	Report

Franklin Essed Stadion, Paramaribo
Referee: Oshane Nation (Jamaica)
13 November 2025
20:00 UTC−6

Guatemala	2–3	Panama
Ordóñez 69'; Muñoz 72'	Report	Waterman 30', 44'; Fajardo 78'

Estadio Manuel Felipe Carrera, Guatemala City
Attendance: 6,819
Referee: César Ramos (Mexico)

18 November 2025
19:00 UTC−6

Guatemala	3–1	Suriname
Lom 49'; Escobar 57'; Santis 65'	Report	Samayoa 90+3' (o.g.)

Estadio Manuel Felipe Carrera, Guatemala City
Attendance: 5,017
Referee: Juan Gabriel Calderón (Costa Rica)
18 November 2025
20:00 UTC−5

Panama	3–0	El Salvador
Blackman 17'; Davis 45+4' (pen.); Rodríguez 85'	Report

Estadio Rommel Fernández, Panama City
Attendance: 21,255
Referee: Saíd Martínez (Honduras)

=== Group B ===
Pos	Team	Pld	W	D	L	GF	GA	GD	Pts	Qualification	(Curaçao)	(Jamaica)	(Trinidad and Tobago)	(Bermuda)
1	Curaçao	6	3	3	0	13	3	+10	12	2026 FIFA World Cup	—	2–0	1–1	3–2
2	Jamaica	6	3	2	1	11	3	+8	11	Inter-confederation play-offs	0–0	—	2–0	4–0
3	Trinidad and Tobago	6	1	4	1	7	6	+1	7		0–0	1–1	—	2–2
4	Bermuda	6	0	1	5	4	23	−19	1		0–7	0–4	0–3	—

Source: FIFA
Rules for classification: Tiebreakers
5 September 2025
19:00 UTC−3

Bermuda	0–4	Jamaica
	Report (FIFA); Report (CONCACAF)	Lowe 6'; Cephas 26'; Palmer 58'; Nicholson 90'

Bermuda National Stadium, Devonshire Parish
Attendance: 4,100
Referee: Keylor Herrera (Costa Rica)
5 September 2025
20:00 UTC−4

Trinidad and Tobago	0–0	Curaçao
	Report (FIFA); Report (CONCACAF)

Hasely Crawford Stadium, Port of Spain
Attendance: 20,182
Referee: Katia García (Mexico)

9 September 2025
19:00 UTC−5

Jamaica	2–0	Trinidad and Tobago
Cadamarteri 36'; Russell 57'	Report (FIFA); Report (CONCACAF)

Independence Park, Kingston
Attendance: 25,016
Referee: Mario Escobar (Guatemala)
9 September 2025
20:00 UTC−4

Curaçao	3–2	Bermuda
Chong 14', 26'; Noslin 75'	Report (FIFA); Report (CONCACAF)	Crichlow 35'; Parfitt 42'

Ergilio Hato Stadium, Willemstad
Attendance: 9,474
Referee: Adonis Carrasco (Dominican Republic)

10 October 2025
19:00 UTC−3

Bermuda	0–3	Trinidad and Tobago
	Report (FIFA); Report (CONCACAF)	Sealy 10'; Spicer 30'; Henry 49'

Bermuda National Stadium, Devonshire Parish
Attendance: 2,900
Referee: Julio Luna (Guatemala)
10 October 2025
19:00 UTC−4

Curaçao	2–0	Jamaica
Comenencia 14'; Gorré 68'	Report (FIFA); Report (CONCACAF)

Ergilio Hato Stadium, Willemstad
Attendance: 9,850
Referee: Bryan López (Guatemala)

14 October 2025
19:00 UTC−4

Curaçao	1–1	Trinidad and Tobago
Gorré 19'	Report (FIFA); Report (CONCACAF)	Spicer 58'

Ergilio Hato Stadium, Willemstad
Attendance: 10,000
Referee: César Ramos (Mexico)
14 October 2025
19:00 UTC−5

Jamaica	4–0	Bermuda
Leverock 24' (o.g.); De Cordova-Reid 26'; Nicholson 35'; Richards 76'	Report (FIFA); Report (CONCACAF)

Independence Park, Kingston
Attendance: 16,214
Referee: Reon Radix (Grenada)

13 November 2025
20:00 UTC−4

Bermuda	0–7	Curaçao
	Report	L. Bacuna 6' (pen.); J. Bacuna 32'; Paulina 48' (pen.), 63'; Hansen 59'; Martha 82'; Van Eijma 90+2'

Bermuda National Stadium, Devonshire Parish
Attendance: 1,181
Referee: Tori Penso (United States)
13 November 2025
20:00 UTC−4

Trinidad and Tobago	1–1	Jamaica
Molino 85'	Report	Cephas 53'

Hasely Crawford Stadium, Port of Spain
Attendance: 16,629
Referee: Walter López (Guatemala)

18 November 2025
20:00 UTC−5

Jamaica	0–0	Curaçao
	Report

Independence Park, Kingston
Attendance: 35,000
Referee: Iván Barton (El Salvador)
18 November 2025
21:00 UTC−4

Trinidad and Tobago	2–2	Bermuda
Henry 9'; James 66'	Report	Tucker 60'; Parfitt 65'

Hasely Crawford Stadium, Port of Spain
Attendance: 7,527
Referee: José Torres (Puerto Rico)

=== Group C ===
Pos	Team	Pld	W	D	L	GF	GA	GD	Pts	Qualification	(Haiti)	(Honduras)	(Costa Rica)	(Nicaragua)
1	Haiti	6	3	2	1	9	6	+3	11	2026 FIFA World Cup	—	0–0	1–0	2–0
2	Honduras	6	2	3	1	5	2	+3	9		3–0	—	0–0	2–0
3	Costa Rica	6	1	4	1	8	6	+2	7		3–3	0–0	—	4–1
4	Nicaragua	6	1	1	4	4	12	−8	4		0–3	2–0	1–1	—

Source: FIFA
Rules for classification: Tiebreakers
5 September 2025
20:00 UTC−4

Haiti	0–0	Honduras
	Report (FIFA); Report (CONCACAF)

Ergilio Hato Stadium, Willemstad (Curaçao)
Attendance: 2,997
Referee: Pierre-Luc Lauzière (Canada)
5 September 2025
20:00 UTC−6

Nicaragua	1–1	Costa Rica
Bonilla 81' (pen.)	Report (FIFA); Report (CONCACAF)	Gamboa 60'

Estadio Nacional, Managua
Attendance: 19,532
Referee: Marco Ortíz (Mexico)

9 September 2025
20:00 UTC−6

Costa Rica	3–3	Haiti
K. Vargas 1'; Martínez 35'; J. Vargas 90+1'	Report (FIFA); Report (CONCACAF)	Nazon 55', 58', 86'

Estadio Nacional, San José
Attendance: 12,000
Referee: Tori Penso (United States)
9 September 2025
20:00 UTC−6

Honduras	2–0	Nicaragua
Quioto 47'; Vega 90+1'	Report (FIFA); Report (CONCACAF)

Estadio Nacional Chelato Uclés, Tegucigalpa
Attendance: 11,000
Referee: Armando Villarreal (United States)

9 October 2025
18:00 UTC−6

Nicaragua	0–3	Haiti
	Report (FIFA); Report (CONCACAF)	Nazon 12'; Jean Jacques 35'; Deedson 90+2'

Estadio Nacional, Managua
Attendance: 18,660
Referee: Víctor Cáceres (Mexico)
9 October 2025
20:00 UTC−6

Honduras	0–0	Costa Rica
	Report (FIFA); Report (CONCACAF)

Estadio General Francisco Morazán, San Pedro Sula
Attendance: 15,109
Referee: Walter López (Guatemala)

13 October 2025
18:00 UTC−6

Honduras	3–0	Haiti
Rivas 18'; Lozano 26'; Quioto 40'	Report (FIFA); Report (CONCACAF)

Estadio Nacional Chelato Uclés, Tegucigalpa
Attendance: 15,675
Referee: Oshane Nation (Jamaica)
13 October 2025
20:00 UTC−6

Costa Rica	4–1	Nicaragua
Martínez 12', 28'; Ugalde 49'; Calvo 90+4'	Report (FIFA); Report (CONCACAF)	Arteaga 26'

Estadio Nacional, San José
Attendance: 30,927
Referee: Ismael Cornejo (El Salvador)

13 November 2025
22:00 UTC−4

Haiti	1–0	Costa Rica
Pierrot 44'	Report

Ergilio Hato Stadium, Willemstad (Curaçao)
Attendance: 1,571
Referee: Joe Dickerson (United States)
13 November 2025
20:00 UTC−6

Nicaragua	2–0	Honduras
Hernández 12'; Moreno 82'	Report

Estadio Nacional, Managua
Attendance: 9,893
Referee: Ismail Elfath (United States)

18 November 2025
19:00 UTC−6

Costa Rica	0–0	Honduras
	Report

Estadio Nacional, San José
Attendance: 33,456
Referee: Drew Fischer (Canada)
18 November 2025
21:00 UTC−4

Haiti	2–0	Nicaragua
Deedson 9'; Providence 45+1'	Report

Ergilio Hato Stadium, Willemstad (Curaçao)
Attendance: 1,500
Referee: Mario Escobar (Guatemala)

== Ranking of second-placed teams ==
Pos	Grp	Team	Pld	W	D	L	GF	GA	GD	Pts	Qualification
1	B	Jamaica	6	3	2	1	11	3	+8	11	Advance to inter-confederation play-offs
2	A	Suriname	6	2	3	1	9	6	+3	9	Advance to inter-confederation play-offs
3	C	Honduras	6	2	3	1	5	2	+3	9	

Source: FIFA
Rules for classification: Tiebreakers

== Goalscorers ==
There were 89 goals scored in 36 matches, for an average of 2.47 goals per match.

4 goals

- (Haiti national football team) Duckens Nazon

3 goals

- (Costa Rica national football team) Alonso Martínez
- (Guatemala national football team) Óscar Santis
- (Suriname national football team) Richonell Margaret

2 goals

- (Bermuda national football team) Djair Parfitt
- (Curaçao national football team) Tahith Chong
- (Curaçao national football team) Kenji Gorré
- (Curaçao national football team) Jordi Paulina
- (Guatemala national football team) Darwin Lom
- (Haiti national football team) Louicius Deedson
- (Honduras national football team) Romell Quioto
- (Jamaica national football team) Renaldo Cephas
- (Jamaica national football team) Shamar Nicholson
- (Panama national football team) José Fajardo
- (Panama national football team) Cecilio Waterman
- (Suriname national football team) Dhoraso Klas
- (Trinidad and Tobago national football team) Kobi Henry
- (Trinidad and Tobago national football team) Tyrese Spicer

1 goal

- (Bermuda national football team) Kane Crichlow
- (Bermuda national football team) Ne-Jai Tucker
- (Costa Rica national football team) Francisco Calvo
- (Costa Rica national football team) Alexis Gamboa
- (Costa Rica national football team) Manfred Ugalde
- (Costa Rica national football team) Juan Pablo Vargas
- (Costa Rica national football team) Kenneth Vargas
- (Curaçao national football team) Juninho Bacuna
- (Curaçao national football team) Leandro Bacuna
- (Curaçao national football team) Livano Comenencia
- (Curaçao national football team) Sontje Hansen
- (Curaçao national football team) Ar'jany Martha
- (Curaçao national football team) Tyrese Noslin
- (Curaçao national football team) Roshon van Eijma
- (El Salvador national football team) Harold Osorio
- (Guatemala national football team) Olger Escobar
- (Guatemala national football team) Rudy Muñoz
- (Guatemala national football team) Arquímides Ordóñez
- (Haiti national football team) Danley Jean Jacques
- (Haiti national football team) Frantzdy Pierrot
- (Haiti national football team) Ruben Providence
- (Honduras national football team) Anthony Lozano
- (Honduras national football team) Rigoberto Rivas
- (Honduras national football team) Alexy Vega
- (Jamaica national football team) Bailey Cadamarteri
- (Jamaica national football team) Bobby De Cordova-Reid
- (Jamaica national football team) Damion Lowe
- (Jamaica national football team) Kasey Palmer
- (Jamaica national football team) Dujuan Richards
- (Jamaica national football team) Jon Russell
- (Nicaragua national football team) Junior Arteaga
- (Nicaragua national football team) Byron Bonilla
- (Nicaragua national football team) Bancy Hernández
- (Nicaragua national football team) Jaime Moreno
- (Panama national football team) César Blackman
- (Panama national football team) Eric Davis
- (Panama national football team) Ismael Díaz
- (Panama national football team) Carlos Harvey
- (Panama national football team) José Luis Rodríguez
- (Suriname national football team) Radinio Balker
- (Suriname national football team) Tjaronn Chery
- (Suriname national football team) Virgil Misidjan
- (Trinidad and Tobago national football team) Nathaniel James
- (Trinidad and Tobago national football team) Kevin Molino
- (Trinidad and Tobago national football team) Dante Sealy

1 own goal

- (Bermuda national football team) Dante Leverock (against Jamaica)
- (Guatemala national football team) Nicolás Samayoa (against Suriname)
- (Suriname national football team) Anfernee Dijksteel (against El Salvador)

== Discipline ==
A player was automatically suspended for the next match for the following infractions:

- Receiving a red card (red card suspensions could be extended for serious infractions)
- Receiving two yellow cards in two different matches (yellow card suspensions were carried forward to further qualification rounds, but not the finals or any other future international matches)

The following suspensions were served during the third round:

Team	Player	Infraction(s)	Suspended for match(es)
Costa Rica	Orlando Galo	(yellow card) vs Haiti (9 September 2025); (yellow card) vs Honduras (9 October 2025)	vs Nicaragua (13 October 2025)
Costa Rica	Alexis Gamboa	(yellow card) vs Nicaragua (5 September 2025); (yellow card) vs Honduras (9 October 2025)	vs Nicaragua (13 October 2025)
El Salvador	Brayan Gil	(yellow card) vs Suriname (8 September 2025); (yellow card) vs Suriname (13 November 2025)	vs Panama (18 November 2025)
El Salvador	Jefferson Valladares	(yellow card) vs Guatemala (4 September 2025); (yellow card) vs Suriname (13 November 2025)	vs Panama (18 November 2025)
Haiti	Carlens Arcus	(yellow card) vs Costa Rica (9 September 2025); (yellow card) vs Nicaragua (9 October 2025)	vs Honduras (13 October 2025)
Haiti	Danley Jean Jacques	(yellow card) vs Costa Rica (9 September 2025); (yellow card) vs Costa Rica (13 November 2025)	vs Nicaragua (18 November 2025)
Honduras	Getsel Montes	(yellow card) vs Costa Rica (9 October 2025); (yellow card) vs Haiti (13 November 2025)	vs Costa Rica (18 November 2025)
Jamaica	Isaac Hayden	(yellow card) vs Bermuda (5 September 2025); (yellow card) vs Trinidad and Tobago (9 September 2025)	vs Curaçao (10 October 2025)
Nicaragua	Óscar Acevedo	(yellow card) vs Honduras (9 September 2025); (yellow card) vs Costa Rica (13 October 2025)	vs Honduras (13 November 2025)
Nicaragua	Jason Coronel	(red card) vs Costa Rica (5 September 2025)	vs Honduras (9 September 2025) vs Haiti (9 October 2025)
Nicaragua	Christian Reyes	(yellow card) vs Haiti (9 October 2025); (yellow card) vs Costa Rica (13 October 2025)	vs Honduras (13 November 2025)
Panama	Aníbal Godoy	(yellow card) vs Guatemala (8 September 2025); (yellow card) vs Guatemala (13 November 2025)	vs El Salvador (18 November 2025)
Suriname	Dhoraso Klas	(yellow card) vs Panama (4 September 2025); (yellow card) vs El Salvador (8 September 2025)	vs Guatemala (10 October 2025)
Trinidad and Tobago	Alvin Jones	(yellow card) (yellow-red card) vs Costa Rica (10 June 2025)	vs Curaçao (5 September 2025)
