= Kole Hall =

Bermudan footballer

Personal information
- Date of birth: 22 August 1998 (age 28)
- Place of birth: Hamilton, Bermuda
- Height: 1.90 m (6 ft 3 in)
- Position: Forward

Team information
- Current team: Chorley

Youth career
- Tranmere Rovers

Senior career*
Years	Team	Apps	(Gls)
2019–2020	City of Liverpool	3	(0)
2020–2022	Radcliffe	35	(5)
2021	→ AFC Telford United (loan)	2	(0)
2022	Altrincham	4	(0)
2022	→ Nantwich Town (dual registration)	4	(1)
2022–2024	Chester	41	(5)
2024	→ Scarborough Athletic (loan)	9	(2)
2024–	Chorley	35	(12)

International career^{‡}
2021–	Bermuda	16	(3)
- * Club domestic league appearances and goals as of 21:05, 4 May 2025 (UTC) ‡ National team caps and goals as of 23:03, 10 June 2025 (UTC)

Kole Hall (born 22 August 1998) is a Bermudan semi-professional footballer who currently plays as a forward for Chorley.

== Club career ==
Born in Hamilton, Bermuda, Hall emigrated to England as a child. Having played in the academy of professional side Tranmere Rovers, he joined City of Liverpool in the 2019–20 season, going on to make three league appearances before signing for Radcliffe the same season.

Following a strong start to the 2020–21 season, scoring four goals in seven appearances, Hall was loaned to National League North side AFC Telford United on a one-month deal in January 2021. In April of the same year, he signed a contract extension with Radcliffe, keeping him with the club for the following season.

After featuring for most of the 2021–22 season with Radcliffe, Hall moved to National League side Altrincham in March 2022. Shortly after joining, he was dual-registered with Northern Premier League side Nantwich Town.

The following year he returned to the National League North with Chester. He signed a new contract with the club at the end of the season, in May 2023.

In March 2024, Hall joined fellow National League North club Scarborough Athletic on loan for the remainder of the season.

== Career statistics ==
=== Club ===
As of 4 May 2025

Appearances and goals by club, season and competition
Club	Season	League			FA Cup		Other		Total	
Club	Season	Division	Apps	Goals	Apps	Goals	Apps	Goals	Apps	Goals
City of Liverpool	2019–20	NPL Division One North West	3	0	0	0	1 (Note: Appearance(s) in the Liverpool Senior Cup)	0	4	0
Radcliffe	2019–20	NPL Premier Division	4	1	0	0	0	0	4	1
Radcliffe	2020–21	NPL Premier Division	7	3	2	1	1 (Note: Appearances in the FA Trophy)	0	10	4
Radcliffe	2021–22	NPL Premier Division	24	1	2	0	3	0	29	1
Radcliffe	Total		35	5	4	1	4	0	43	6
Telford United (loan)	2020–21	National League North	2	0	0	0	0	0	2	0
Altrincham	2021–22	National League	4	0	0	0	0	0	4	0
Nantwich Town (dual registration)	2021–22	NPL Premier Division	4	1	0	0	0	0	4	1
Chester	2022–23	National League North	24	4	4	2	4 (Note: Two appearances and one goal in FA Trophy, one appearance in Cheshire Senior Cup, one appearance in National League North play-offs)	1	32	7
Chester	2023–24	National League North	16	1	0	0	0	0	16	1
Chester	Total		40	5	4	2	4	1	48	8
Scarborough Athletic (loan)	2023–24	National League North	9	2	0	0	0	0	9	2
Chorley	2024–25	National League North	35	12	2	0	2	0	39	12
Career total			132	25	10	3	11	1	153	29

=== International ===
As of match played 11 June 2025

National team	Year	Apps	Goals
Bermuda	2021	3	1
Bermuda	2022	3	0
Bermuda	2024	8	1
Bermuda	2025	2	1
Total		16	3

Scores and results list Bermuda's goal tally first, score column indicates score after each Hall goal.

List of international goals scored by Kole Hall
No.	Date	Venue	Opponent	Score	Result	Competition	Ref.
1	8 June 2021	IMG Academy, Bradenton, United States	Cayman Islands	1–1	1–1	2022 FIFA World Cup qualification	
2	15 October 2024	Bermuda National Stadium, Devonshire Parish, Bermuda	Dominica	2–0	3–2	2024–25 CONCACAF Nations League B	
2	4 June 2025	Bermuda National Stadium, Devonshire Parish, Bermuda	Cayman Islands	3–0	5–0	2026 FIFA World Cup qualification	
