= Kane Crichlow =

Bermudian footballer (born 2000)

Personal information
- Full name: Kane Sinclair Crichlow
- Date of birth: 21 August 2000 (age 26)
- Place of birth: Warwick, Bermuda
- Height: 1.78 m (5 ft 10 in)
- Position: Midfielder

Team information
- Current team: Dagenham & Redbridge

Youth career
- 2012–2018: Cornellà
- 2018–2019: AFC Wimbledon
- 2019–2020: Watford

Senior career*
Years	Team	Apps	(Gls)
2020–2022	Watford	0	(0)
2022–2023	Episkopi	13	(1)
2023–2024	Bishop's Stortford	19	(2)
2024–2025	Chelmsford City	37	(13)
2025–2026	Sutton United	7	(0)
2025–2026	→ Chelmsford City (loan)	21	(3)
2026–	Dagenham & Redbridge	0	(0)

International career^{‡}
- Bermuda U15
- Bermuda U17
- Bermuda U20
2021–	Bermuda	23	(12)
- * Club domestic league appearances and goals as of 11:20, 26 April 2026 (UTC) ‡ National team caps and goals as of 21:00, 10 September 2025 (UTC)

Kane Sinclair Crichlow (born 21 August 2000) is a Bermudian professional footballer who plays as a midfielder for National League South club Dagenham & Redbridge and the Bermuda national team.

== Club career ==
In 2012, Crichlow left Bermuda to join the youth academy of Spanish side Cornellà.

In November 2017, Crichlow appeared in a friendly on trial for AFC Wimbledon. By the following year, he was a member of the club's under-18 squad.

In May 2019, it was announced that Crichlow would join Watford in July from AFC Wimbledon, signing a two-year contract.

Crichlow made his professional debut for Watford on 22 September 2020 as a substitute in the EFL Cup against Newport County.

At the end of the 2021–22 season, it was announced that Crichlow would be leaving the club upon the end of his contract.

In August 2022, Crichlow signed for Greek Super League 2 club Episkopi.

In December 2023, he signed for Bishop's Stortford and early in his Bishop Stortford career, Crichlow scored an added-time equaliser and scored in the ensuing penalty shootout as Bishop's Stortford won at higher-level Ebbsfleet United on penalties in the third round of the FA Trophy. In January 2024, he scored five goals in a single game against Aldershot Town in the FA Trophy.

On 19 July 2024, following a successful trial, Crichlow signed for Chelmsford City.

On 23 May 2025, Crichlow signed for National League club Sutton United. On 24 December 2025, after eleven appearances in all competitions for Sutton, Crichlow returned to Chelmsford on loan until the end of the season.

On 20 May 2026, Dagenham & Redbridge announced the signing of Crichlow on a two-year deal.

== International career ==
Crichlow has represented Bermuda at under-15, under-17 and under-20 levels. In March 2021, he was called up by Bermuda for their CONCACAF Group B qualifiers against Canada and Aruba later that month. He made his debut on 25 March 2021 in a World Cup qualifier against Canada and scored his team's only goal as Canada won 5–1. On 16 November 2024, Crichlow scored his tenth goal for Bermuda, scoring the opening goal in a 2–1 win against Antigua and Barbuda.

== Career statistics ==
=== Club ===
As of 22 September 2020

Club	Season	League			National Cup		League Cup		Continental		Other		Total	
Club	Season	Division	Apps	Goals	Apps	Goals	Apps	Goals	Apps	Goals	Apps	Goals	Apps	Goals
Watford	2020–21	Championship	0	0	0	0	1	0	—				1	0
Career total			0	0	0	0	1	0	0	0	0	0	1	0

==== International goals ====
Scores and results list Bermuda's goal tally first.

No.	Date	Venue	Opponent	Score	Result	Competition
1	25 March 2021	Exploria Stadium, Orlando, United States	Canada	1–3	1–5	2022 FIFA World Cup qualification
2	30 March 2021	IMG Academy, Bradenton, United States	Aruba	1–0	5–0	2022 FIFA World Cup qualification
3	30 March 2021	IMG Academy, Bradenton, United States	Aruba	5–0	5–0	2022 FIFA World Cup qualification
4	2 July 2021	DRV PNK Stadium, Fort Lauderdale, United States	Barbados	6–1	8–1	2021 CONCACAF Gold Cup qualification
5	13 October 2023	FFB Stadium, Belmopan, Belize	Belize	1–0	1–0	2023–24 CONCACAF Nations League B
6	17 October 2023	Bermuda National Stadium, Devonshire Parish, Bermuda	Belize	1–0	1–1	2023–24 CONCACAF Nations League B
7	17 November 2023	Bermuda National Stadium, Devonshire Parish, Bermuda	Saint Vincent and the Grenadines	2–1	3–1	2023–24 CONCACAF Nations League B
8	7 September 2024	ABFA Technical Center, Piggotts, Antigua and Barbuda	Dominican Republic	1–0	2–3	2024–25 CONCACAF Nations League B
9	10 September 2024	ABFA Technical Center, Piggotts, Antigua and Barbuda	Antigua and Barbuda	1–0	1–0	2024–25 CONCACAF Nations League B
10	16 November 2024	Estadio Cibao FC, Santiago de los Caballeros, Dominican Republic	Antigua and Barbuda	1–0	2–1	2024–25 CONCACAF Nations League B
11	21 March 2025	Bermuda National Stadium, Devonshire Parish, Bermuda	Honduras	1–0	3–5	2025 CONCACAF Gold Cup qualification
12	10 September 2025	Ergilio Hato Stadium, Willemstad, Curaçao	Curaçao	2–1	2–3	2026 FIFA World Cup qualification
