= Djair Parfitt-Williams =

Bermudan footballer (born 1996)

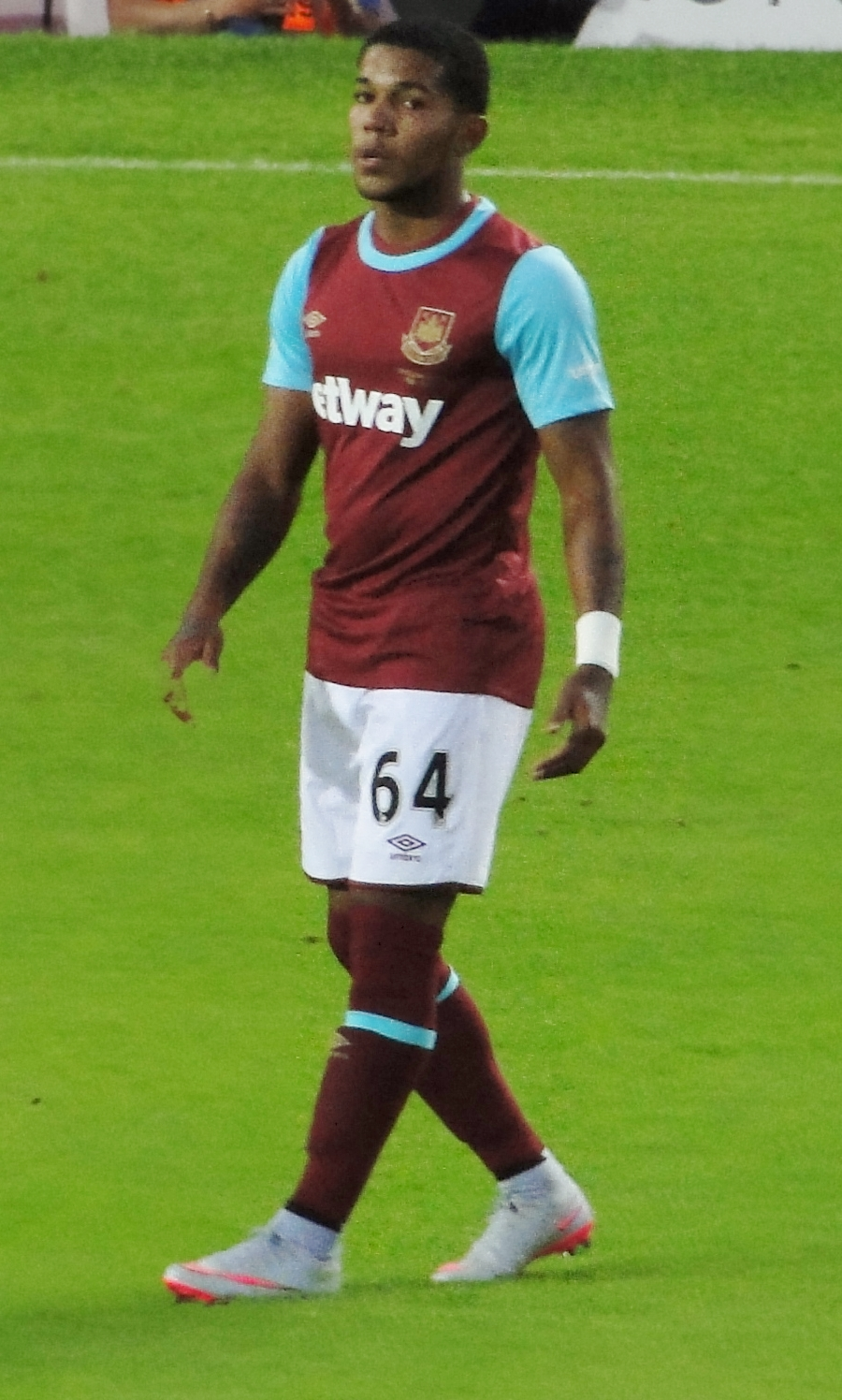
- Djair Parfitt with West Ham United in 2015

Personal information
- Full name: Djair Terraii Parfitt-Williams
- Date of birth: 1 October 1996 (age 30)
- Place of birth: Hamilton, Bermuda
- Height: 1.72 m (5 ft 8 in)
- Position: Forward

Youth career
- 2009: Elk Grove Everton
- 2010–2011: San Jose Earthquakes
- 2011–2015: West Ham United

Senior career*
Years	Team	Apps	(Gls)
2015–2017	West Ham United	0	(0)
2018–2019	Rudar Velenje	21	(3)
2020–2022	Fylkir	31	(7)
2022	Dover Athletic	9	(0)
2022–2023	Ilves	26	(6)
2024	Makedonikos	3	(0)
2024	Glentoran	3	(0)
2025	Haka	17	(0)

International career^{‡}
2022–	Bermuda	23	(8)
- * Club domestic league appearances and goals as of 19 November 2025 ‡ National team caps and goals as of 09:24, 7 April 2026 (UTC)

Djair Terraii Parfitt-Williams (born 1 October 1996) is a Bermudian professional footballer who plays as a forward for the Bermuda national team.

== Early years ==
Parfitt-Williams was born in Hamilton, Bermuda and moved to California at the age of eight. In 2009, he played for Elk Grove Everton FC in Sacramento, California and was selected to participate in a national youth tournament.

== Career ==
=== West Ham United ===
Parfitt-Williams joined West Ham United after being scouted at age 14 in California while playing for MLS academy San Jose Earthquakes by former West Ham player Clyde Best. On 2 July 2015, Parfitt made his first team debut in a 3–0 home victory at the Boleyn Ground over Lusitans in the UEFA Europa League, replacing Mauro Zarate after 74 minutes. He was first included in a West Ham matchday squad for their Premier League fixture against Aston Villa at Villa Park on 26 December 2015, remaining as an unused substitute as they drew 1–1. On 25 April 2016, he scored the 90th-minute winner in the U21 Premier League Cup final that West Ham won 1–0. Coming off injury, Parfitt scored in the EFL Trophy match against the League One side Northampton Town, which finished 1–1 with West Ham winning on penalties.

=== Rudar Velenje ===
In February 2018, Parfitt-Williams joined the Slovenian PrvaLiga side Rudar Velenje.

=== Fylkir ===
Ahead of the 2020 season, Parfitt-Williams joined Úrvalsdeild side Fylkir and scored his first goal for the club in a 4–1 win over KA in July 2020.

=== Dover Athletic ===
On 19 February 2022 Parfitt-Williams joined National League club Dover Athletic on non-contract terms. On 25 April 2022, he was announced to have left the club.

=== Ilves ===
On 26 August 2022, Parfitt-Williams joined Veikkausliiga side Ilves on a deal until the end of the year with an option to extend for a further year.

=== Makedonikos ===
On 18 January 2024, Parfitt-Williams signed with Makedonikos in Super League Greece 2.

=== Glentoran ===
In September 2024, Parfitt-Williams joined NIFL Premiership side Glentoran.

== Career statistics ==
As of 27 November 2024

Appearances and goals by club, season and competition
Club	Season	League			National cup (Note: Includes FA Cup, Icelandic Cup, Suomen Cup)		Other		Continental		Total	
Club	Season	Division	Apps	Goals	Apps	Goals	Apps	Goals	Apps	Goals	Apps	Goals
West Ham United	2015–16	Premier League	0	0	0	0	0	0	2 (Note: Appearance(s) in UEFA Europa League)	0	2	0
West Ham United	2016–17	Premier League	0	0	0	0	0	0	—		0	0
West Ham United	Total		0	0	0	0	0	0	2	0	2	0
Rudar Velenje	2017–18	Slovenian PrvaLiga	17	3	0	0	—		—		17	3
Rudar Velenje	2018–19	Slovenian PrvaLiga	4	0	0	0	—		4	1	8	1
Rudar Velenje	Total		21	3	0	0	0	0	4	1	25	4
Fylkir	2020	Besta deild karla	18	2	1	0	1 (Note: Includes Icelandic League Cup)	0	—		20	2
Fylkir	2021	Besta deild karla	13	5	1	2	0	0	—		14	7
Fylkir	Total		31	7	2	2	1	0	0	0	34	9
Dover Athletic	2021–22	National League	9	0	0	0	0	0	—		9	0
Ilves	2022	Veikkausliiga	6	1	0	0	0	0	—		6	1
Ilves	2023	Veikkausliiga	20	5	3	2	5 (Note: Includes Finnish League Cup)	2	—		28	9
Ilves	Total		26	6	3	2	5	2	0	0	34	10
Makedonikos	2023–24	Super League Greece 2	3	0	0	0	—		—		3	0
Glentoran	2024–25	NIFL Premiership	3	0	0	0	1 (Note: Includes Irish League Cup)	0	–		4	0
Haka	2025	Veikkausliiga	0	0	0	0	0	0	–		0	0
Career total			93	16	5	4	7	2	6	1	111	23

== International career ==
On 4 June 2022, Parfitt made his international debut for Bermuda in the 2022–23 CONCACAF Nations League B match against Haiti. He scored his first international goal against Saint Vincent and the Grenadines at the 2023–24 CONCACAF Nations League B. On 22 March 2024, Parfitt scored his second goal for Bermuda during the 2024 FIFA Series tournament against Brunei.

List of international goals scored
No.	Date	Venue	Opponent	Score	Result	Competition
1	17 November 2023	Bermuda National Stadium, Devonshire Parish, Bermuda	Saint Vincent and the Grenadines	3–1	3–1	2023–24 CONCACAF Nations League
2	21 March 2024	Prince Abdullah Al-Faisal Sports City, Jeddah, Saudi Arabia	Brunei	2–0	2–0	2024 FIFA Series
3	4 June 2025	Bermuda National Stadium, Devonshire Parish, Bermuda	Cayman Islands	2–0	5–0	2026 FIFA World Cup qualification
4	10 June 2025	Estadio Antonio Maceo, Santiago de Cuba, Cuba	Cuba	1–0	2–1	2026 FIFA World Cup qualification
5	10 September 2025	Ergilio Hato Stadium, Willemstad, Curaçao	Curaçao	2–2	2–3	2026 FIFA World Cup qualification

== Personal life ==
On 22 June 2016, Parfitt was involved in a motorcycle accident during a visit to Bermuda where he suffered a bruised hip and road rash on both arms when the bike he was travelling on as a passenger collided with a car.

== Sources ==
- "Parfitt Signs with Glentoran FC in Northern Ireland". islandstats.com. 18 September 2024.
