= PayPal Park =

Soccer stadium in San Jose, California

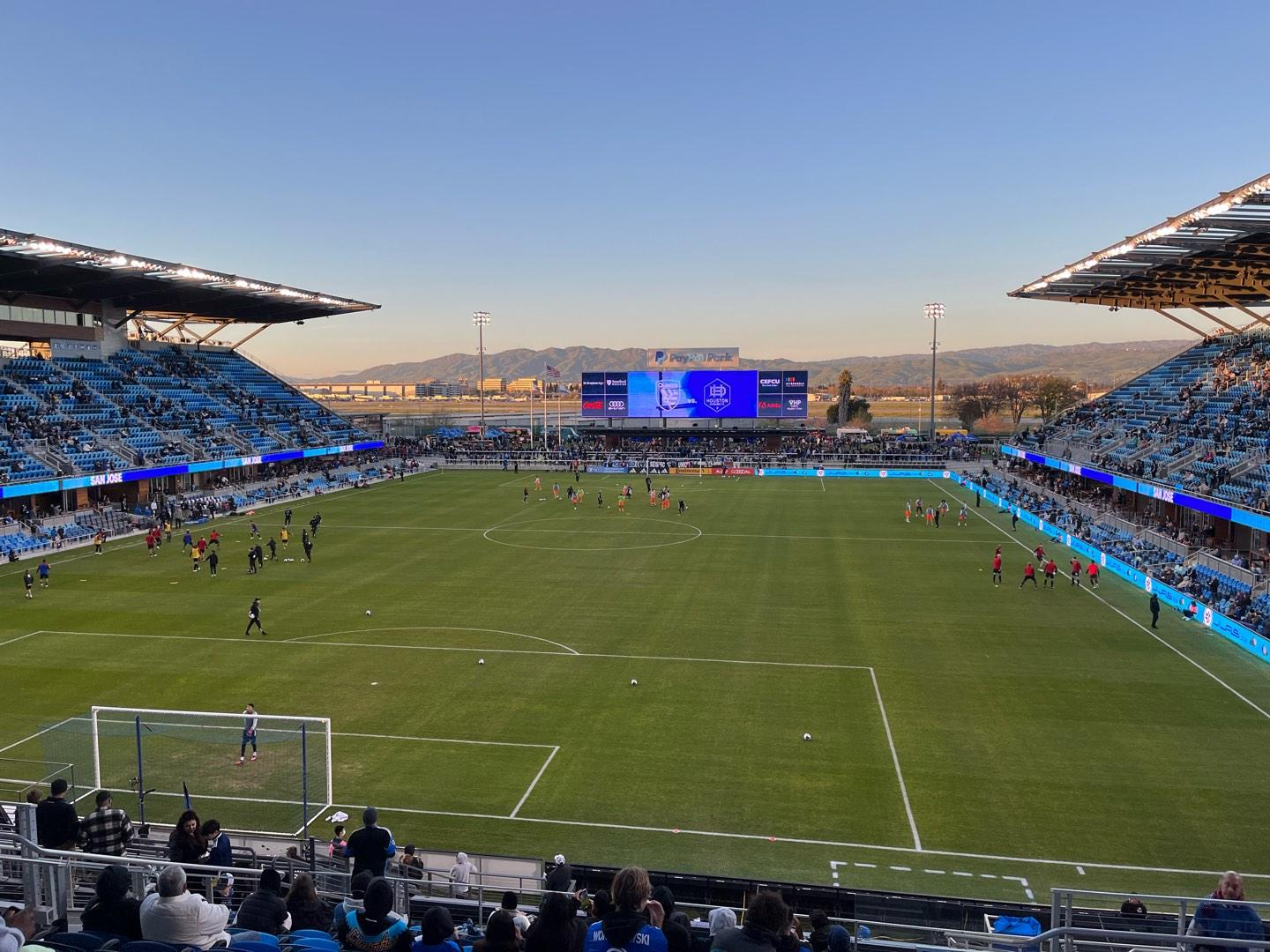

- Location in San Jose Location in California Location in the United States
- Former names: Avaya Stadium (2015–2020); Earthquakes Stadium (2020–2021)
- Address: 1123 Coleman Avenue
- Location: San Jose, California, U.S.
- Coordinates: 37°21′5″N 121°55′30″W
- Owner: San Jose Earthquakes
- Operator: San Jose Earthquakes
- Capacity: 18,000
- Surface: SISGrass hybrid grass
- Field size: 115 yd × 74 yd (105 m × 68 m)
- Public transit: at Santa Clara Transit Center; VTA Bus: 60

Construction
- Groundbreaking: October 21, 2012
- Opened: March 22, 2015
- Renovated: 2022–2023
- Cost: $100 million
- Architect: HOK (formerly 360 Architecture)
- Project manager: David Albert
- Structural engineer: Magnusson Klemencic Associates
- Services engineer: WSP Global
- General contractor: Devcon Construction

Tenants
- San Jose Earthquakes (MLS) (2015–present); The Town FC (MLSNP) (2022–2023) (Note: The stadium was the primary home of San Jose Earthquakes II from 2022–2023, but after rebrand to The Town FC became home for select home matches as the club moved to Saint Mary's Stadium); Bay FC (NWSL) (2024–present)

PayPal Park (formerly Earthquakes Stadium and Avaya Stadium) is a soccer-specific stadium in San Jose, California. It is the home stadium of the San Jose Earthquakes of Major League Soccer (MLS) and Bay FC of the National Women's Soccer League (NWSL). The stadium is located on the Airport West site next to San Jose International Airport.

PayPal Park officially opened on February 27, 2015, and has a seating capacity of 18,000. The stadium features a canopy roof and some of the steepest-raked seating in Major League Soccer to provide a better view. Additionally, the area behind the northeast goal houses the largest outdoor bar in North America, a 2-acre (0.81 ha) fan zone and a double-sided video scoreboard. The suites and club seats are located at field level. The stadium is part of a mixed-use residential, retail, R&D, and hotel development.

The stadium was constructed privately with no public money provided by the city of San Jose. Additionally, Lewis Wolff, the then owner of the San Jose Earthquakes, offered to pay for the maintenance of the stadium for a 55-year time span. The team organization initially delayed the completion date to the middle of the 2014 MLS season, but later delayed it again to the 2015 season. The seat pattern includes three different shades of blue as well as a smattering of red seats to pay homage to the club's NASL history. Additionally, the pattern contains the message "Go EQ" written in binary.

In North American competitions, the stadium is known as San Jose Stadium due to advertising rules.

== History and details ==
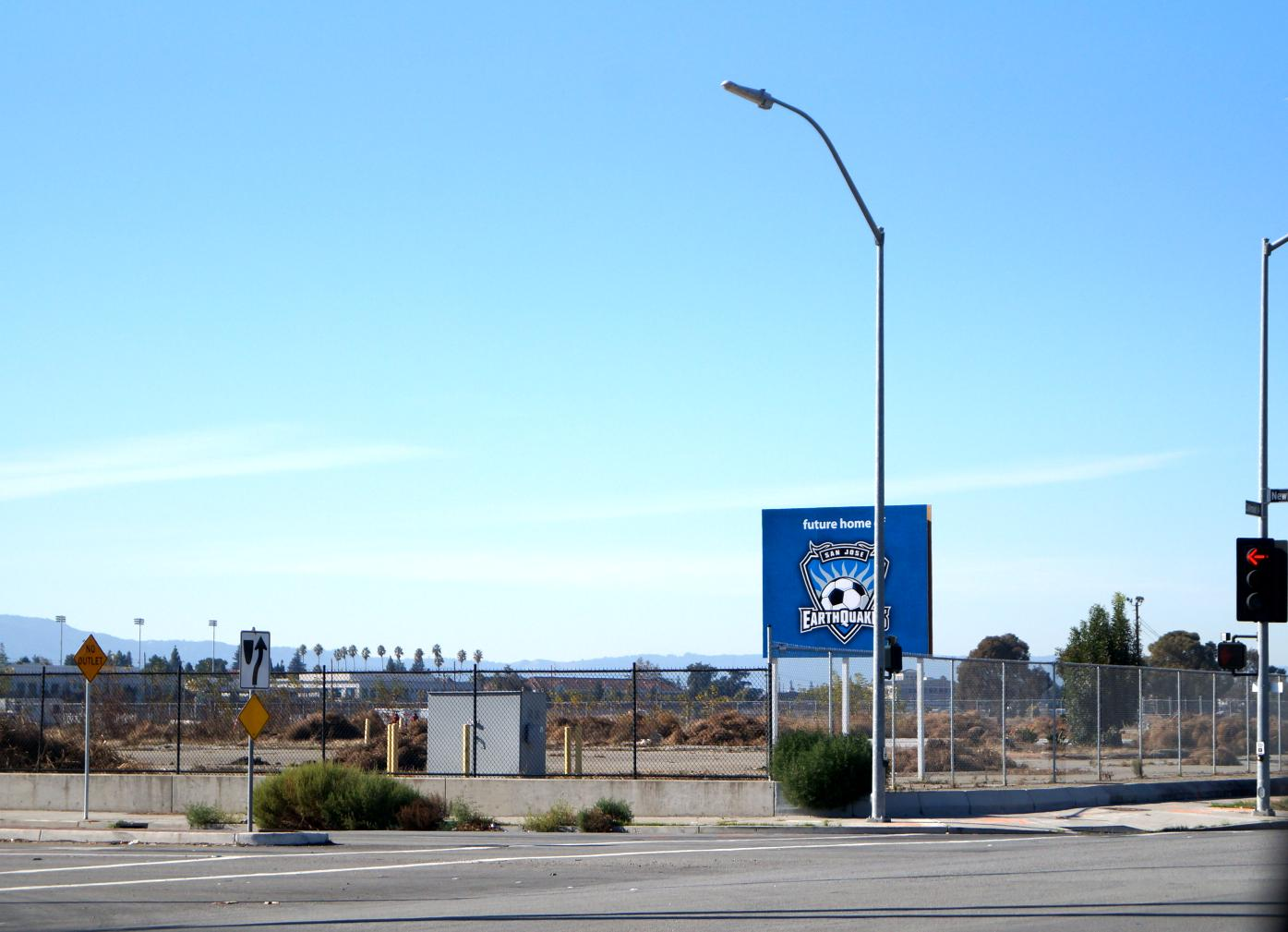
Stadium site before construction.

=== Planning ===
The proposal for the new stadium for the Earthquakes was brought before the San Jose City Council in June 2007. The proposal called for the city of San Jose to rezone a parcel of industrial land in the city's Edenvale district to residential uses. The parcel is owned by iStar Financial, but members of the Earthquakes ownership group own an option to purchase the land. Rezoning the parcel would increase the value of the property by approximately $80 million. The site's industrial capacity would be transferred to surrounding properties allowing those sites to increase the density of the developments on their land, eliminating early generation single level developments. This would also preserve the industrial capacity for the city in the Edenvale area. The option on the land would then be sold and the proceeds would be used to construct the soccer-specific stadium on the Airport West site (formerly the site of an FMC Corp. facility) at no cost to the city. Additionally, Wolff and his partners will be funding and building the mixed-use development adjacent to the stadium out of pocket.

On April 15, 2008, it was revealed that a deal to sell the Airport West site to the group headed by the Earthquakes ownership had been reached. The ownership group would pay $132 million for 66 acres (270,000 m^{2}) of the Airport West site, land San Jose purchased for $81 million in 2005. The deal was approved after the May 21 vote by the San Jose city council. The purchase price was renegotiated between the city and ownership group in April 2009 to account for the lost value of the land due to the economic climate change since the original deal was struck. Additionally, the Earthquakes and their partners have reduced the purchased land size from the full 75 acres (300,000 m^{2}) of the Airport West site to a smaller 65-acre (260,000 m^{2}) parcel further reducing their purchase price to $89 million.

Lewis Wolff's ownership group's purchase of the Airport West site from the city of San Jose also alleviated the city of $7.5 million in tax service the city was paying on the site annually. The Airport West site had previously been purchased by the city for a possible expansion to the San Jose International Airport infrastructure. However, as of November 2007, the airport had indicated that the land is no longer needed in any current or projected developments.

The city estimates that the total development of both the Airport West and iStar site would bring approximately $1.3 billion worth of capital investment to San Jose and would bring in millions of dollars in tax revenues. The development would also provide new research and development, retail, and hotel jobs to the city. The iStar site would be developed with a mix of residential and commercial uses, while the Airport West site would be developed by Wolff with two hotels, as well as residential, research, and retail developments.

In a San Jose Mercury News article in August 2009, Lew Wolff backed off from publicly claiming a definite 2012 opening date for the stadium until a naming rights sponsor could be found and signed.

The first official public renderings of the stadium were released to the public on September 19, 2009, by team owner Lewis Wolff. The rezoning of the property was approved March 16, 2010 to allow for the construction of the stadium.

In April 2010, the Earthquakes completed construction and opened the Nutrilite Training Facility, including a training field adjacent to land intended for the new stadium.

In November 2010, Earthquakes ownership requested the City of San Jose for another amendment to the purchase option for the stadium site. The amendment reduces non-refundable option payments to the city by $2 million to $5 million as well as extends the option period from 2013 to 2015. If Earthquakes ownership closes on the property earlier, a reduction of $4 million in non-refundable option payments will occur. If the economic climate continues to preclude the implementation of the stadium, the option includes provisions for the city to consider allowing retail on the stadium site.

On January 20, 2011, the Earthquakes submitted an application to the city for a development permit.

=== Construction ===
The San Jose Earthquakes held a demolition ceremony at the stadium site on March 3, 2011, to kick off a 12-week demolition in advance of construction. On December 14, 2011, the planning commission approved the permit for stadium construction, which was subsequently appealed by residents nearby the site. On February 22, 2012, the commission heard the appeal and voted unanimously to reject the appeal and finalize the approval of the construction permit. The team organization stated they still planned to open the stadium in 2014.

The groundbreaking of the new stadium occurred on October 21, 2012, with 6,256 participants on hand digging into the ground, smashing the previous world record. An official Guinness World Records adjudicator was on site to verify the record.

Earthquakes President Dave Kaval stated in a February 2013 interview that stadium construction would begin by February 26, with the stadium on track for completion by early 2014.

However, while construction crews demolished and prepared the site for construction, they discovered three underground concrete bunkers and several hundred concrete pilings from the previous FMC factory. These obstacles caused the completion date for the stadium to be pushed back to July 2014. This was later revised to a scheduled completion date of early 2015. Demolition, grading, and the site utilities were installed by the middle of September 2013. The next steps in the process were the pouring of the foundations, followed by the steel erection.

The first steps taken in building the actual structure of the stadium occurred on September 27, 2013, when concrete pouring of the team building and locker rooms took place. This was followed by the stadium foundations. The first steel beams for the stadium were laid on November 5, 2013, and on March 28, 2014, the final beam was hoisted in place.

The first of the 18,000 seats were installed in the stadium on September 23, 2014.

=== Development ===
On November 19, 2014, Santa Clara based technology company Avaya was confirmed as the naming rights partner for the Earthquakes' new stadium, officially called Avaya Stadium, paying $20 million over a 10-year deal. In January 2017, Avaya filed for Chapter 11 bankruptcy and initially intended to retain the naming rights to the stadium, but in December, Avaya requested a federal judge to reduce their commitment to the agreement. After Avaya vacated their naming rights, the venue was renamed Earthquakes Stadium in 2020.

Ahead of the 2021 MLS season, the playing surface which had previously consisted of Kentucky bluegrass or Bermuda grass at various times was replaced with a SIS Pitches SISGrass hybrid surface featuring a blend of Kentucky bluegrass, ryegrass, and synthetic fiber.

On April 5, 2021, the Earthquakes announced that they had secured a new 10-year partnership with locally based PayPal for the stadium to be named PayPal Park. As part of the agreement, PayPal Park was outfitted with PayPal and Venmo's digital payments technology.

== Sports ==
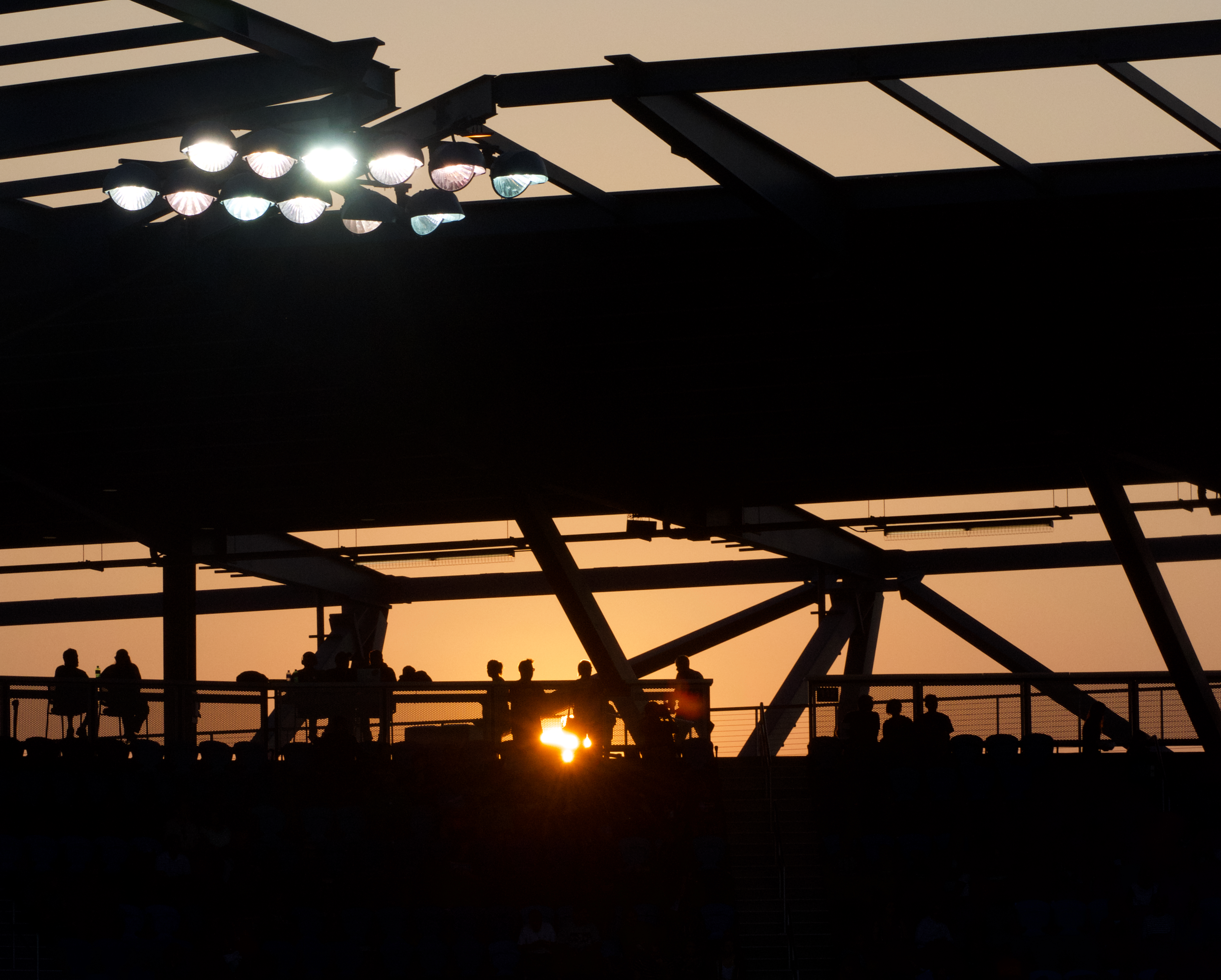
Sunset during an Earthquakes match in 2017

=== Soccer ===
PayPal Park's first-ever match was the San Jose Earthquakes' final 2015 preseason game against the Los Angeles Galaxy on February 28, 2015, followed by the Earthquakes' 2015 regular season home opener against the Chicago Fire on March 22, 2015.

On May 10, 2015, the United States women's national soccer team played its first send-off series match ahead of the 2015 FIFA Women's World Cup, defeating the Republic of Ireland 3–0.

In 2016, PayPal Park hosted the MLS All-Star Game between the MLS All-Stars and the English Premier League's Arsenal, which the latter won 2–1.

PayPal Park has also hosted a number of exhibition matches featuring both domestic and international clubs, including 10 meetings between Liga MX sides.

The stadium was a neutral venue for the 2022 U.S. Open Cup second round match between Bay Cities FC of the National Independent Soccer Association and Monterey Bay FC of the USL Championship.

On February 3, 2022, the Earthquakes announced their second team San Jose Earthquakes II would play their home MLS Next Pro matches at the stadium. The reserve team was rebranded as The Town FC ahead of the 2024 season and moved the majority of their home matches to Saint Mary's Stadium in Moraga, California, with three home matches of the season scheduled to be played in San Jose at PayPal Park.

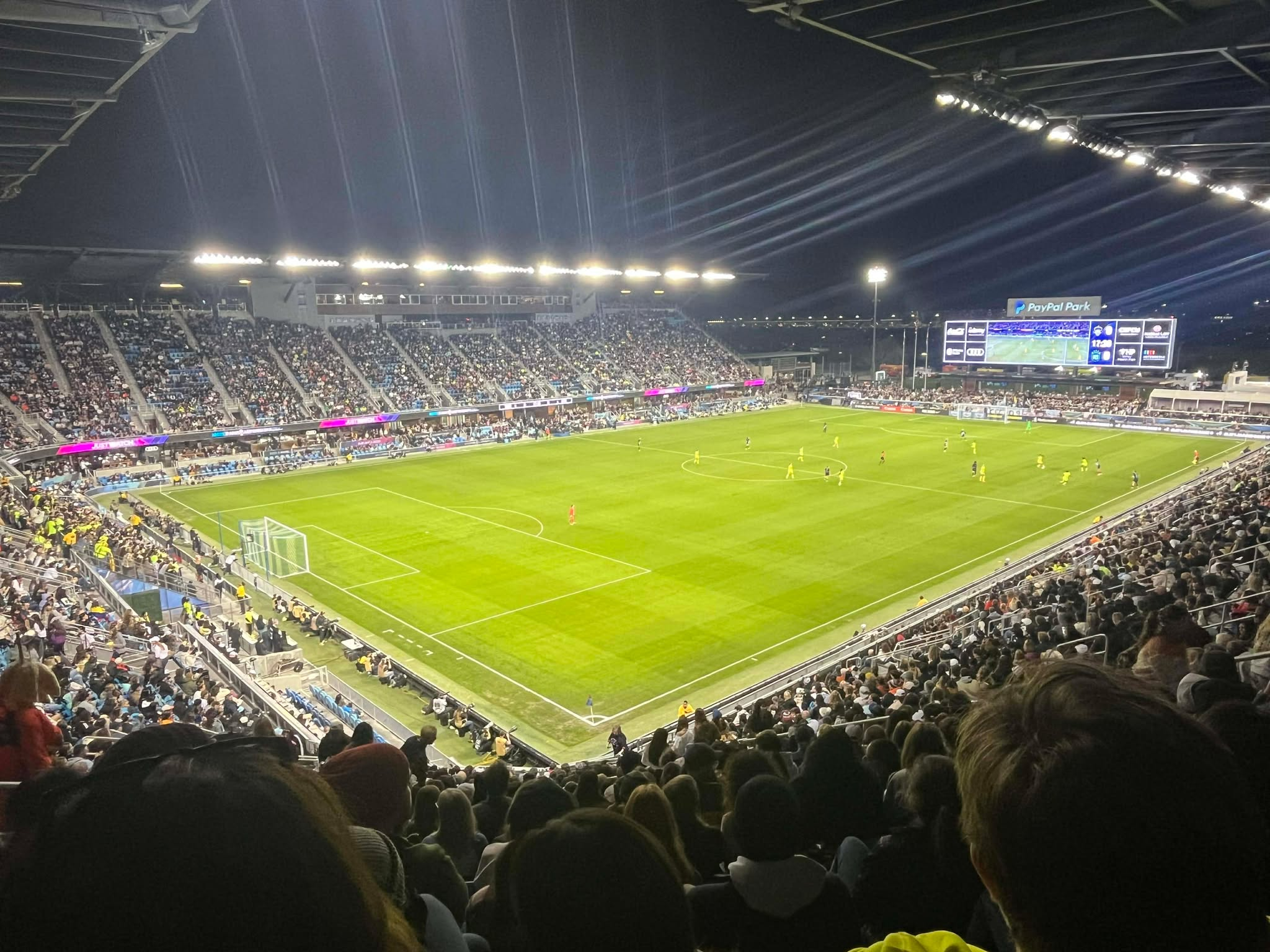
The 2025 NWSL Championship game being held at PayPal Park.

On July 21, 2023, National Women's Soccer League expansion club Bay FC announced that they had signed a five-year agreement to play at PayPal Park while planning construction of their own stadium. A new, 3,600-square-foot (330 m^{2}) facility at the stadium would house the team's locker room and office spaces.

The stadium hosted a sellout crowd for the 2025 NWSL Championship between Washington Spirit and Gotham FC, which Gotham won 1–0.

==== 2028 Summer Olympics ====
On February 3, 2026, the organizing committee of the 2028 Summer Olympics announced that PayPal Park was selected as one of six stadiums to host preliminary matches of the Olympic soccer tournaments; during the course of the Olympic Games, the stadium will be temporarily renamed to "San José Stadium" in accordance with IOC's policy on corporate-sponsored names.

=== Rugby ===
PayPal Park was also designed to host rugby matches. The stadium's first rugby match was a double-header for the 2015 World Rugby Pacific Nations Cup on July 18, 2015, between Canada and Japan, followed by the United States and Samoa.

=== Ultimate Frisbee ===
PayPal Park hosted the 2015 AUDL Championship on August 9, won by the local San Jose Spiders.

=== Lacrosse ===
PayPal Park hosted Week 9 of the 2019 Premier Lacrosse League season over the weekend of August 10–11.

== International matches ==
=== Men's matches ===
Date	Winning Team	Result	Losing Team	Tournament	Spectators
July 28, 2016	(England) Arsenal	2–1	(United States) (Canada) MLS All Stars	2016 MLS All Star Game	18,000
March 24, 2017	United States	6–0	Honduras	2018 FIFA World Cup qualification – CONCACAF fifth round	17,729
February 2, 2019	United States	2–0	Costa Rica	Friendly	13,656
April 24, 2022	Guatemala	4–0	El Salvador	Friendly	18,000
March 12, 2023	Guatemala	1–1	Panama	Friendly	5,000
May 26, 2024	Guatemala	1–1	Nicaragua	Friendly	
June 15, 2025	United States	5–0	Trinidad and Tobago	2025 CONCACAF Gold Cup Group D	12,602
June 17, 2025	Curaçao	0–0	El Salvador	2025 CONCACAF Gold Cup Group B	13,042
June 20, 2025	Jamaica	2–1	Guadeloupe	2025 CONCACAF Gold Cup Group C	2,405
June 24, 2025	Honduras	2–1	Curaçao	2025 CONCACAF Gold Cup Group B	10,935

=== Women's matches ===
Date	Winning Team	Result	Losing Team	Tournament	Spectators
May 10, 2015	United States	3–0	Republic of Ireland	Friendly	18,000
November 10, 2016	United States	8–1	Romania	Friendly	16,425
November 12, 2017	United States	3–1	Canada	Friendly	17,960
September 4, 2018	United States	4–0	Chile	Friendly	14,340
July 9, 2023	United States	2–0	Wales	Friendly	18,000
April 8, 2025	Brazil	2–1	United States	Friendly	18,000
April 11, 2026	United States	2–1	Japan	Friendly	17,435

=== Rugby Union ===
Date	Winning Team	Result	Losing Team	Tournament	Spectators
July 18, 2015	Japan	20–6	Canada	2015 Pacific Nations Cup	6,700
July 18, 2015	Samoa	21–16	United States	2015 Pacific Nations Cup	6,700
June 18, 2016	Italy	24–20	United States	Friendly	TBD

== Non-sports events ==
The stadium was initially not approved for concerts upon its opening in 2015. After over a decade, on November 19, 2025, the City of San Jose’s Planning Commission approved the stadium as a concert venue for up to 15 events per year. BelicoFest was the first concert announcement for the venue, with the Mexicana Musica festival set for August 29, 2026. The Earthquakes also announced their own Epicenter Music Series on July 13, 2026, as a continuing series of performances at the stadium's two-acre lawn adjacent to the stadium. The first concert on August 13, 2026, titled "Back 2 The Bay", will focus on West Coast hip-hop.

== Notes ==
Preceded by Buck Shaw Stadium	Home of the San Jose Earthquakes; 2015–present	Succeeded by current
Preceded by WakeMed Soccer Park	Women's College Cup host 2016	Succeeded by Orlando City Stadium
