= Edwin Rodríguez (footballer) =

Honduran footballer (born 1999)

Personal information
- Full name: Edwin Alexander Rodríguez Castillo
- Date of birth: 25 September 1999 (age 27)
- Place of birth: Quimistán, Honduras
- Height: 1.64 m (5 ft 5 in)
- Position: Right winger

Team information
- Current team: Olimpia

Youth career
- –2018: Olimpia

Senior career*
Years	Team	Apps	(Gls)
2018–	Olimpia	222	(28)
2022–2023	→ Aris (loan)	1	(0)

International career^{‡}
2018	Honduras U20	2	(0)
2021	Honduras U23	5	(2)
2019–	Honduras	47	(6)
Medal record
Men's association football
Representing Honduras
CONCACAF Nations League
Bronze medal – third place	2021
- * Club domestic league appearances and goals as of 20 November 2024 ‡ National team caps and goals as of 6 September 2024

Edwin Alexander Rodríguez Castillo (born 25 September 1999) is a Honduran professional footballer who plays as a wide midfielder for Liga Nacional club Olimpia and the Honduras national team.

== Career ==
=== Aris ===
On 14 September 2022, Aris officially announced the signing of Rodríguez on a season-long loan with a purchase option of €1,000,000 for the summer of 2023.

== Career statistics ==
=== Club ===
As of 22 August 2024

Club	Season	League			Cup (Note: Includes Greek Cup, Central American Cup)		Continental		Total	
Club	Season	Division	Apps	Goals	Apps	Goals	Apps	Goals	Apps	Goals
Olimpia	2017–18	Liga Nacional	4	0	–		–		4	0
Olimpia	2018–19	Liga Nacional	11	2	–		–		11	2
Olimpia	2019–20	Liga Nacional	24	1	–		7 (Note: Four appearances in the CONCACAF League, three appearances in the CONCACAF Champions League)	0	31	1
Olimpia	2020–21	Liga Nacional	31	2	–		5 (Note: Three appearances and one goal in the CONCACAF League, two appearances in the CONCACAF Champions League)	1	36	3
Olimpia	2021–22	Liga Nacional	38	4	–		1 (Note: Appearance in the CONCACAF League)	1	39	5
Olimpia	2022–23	Liga Nacional	24	3	–		5	1	29	4
Olimpia	2023–24	Liga Nacional	38	8	3	0	–		41	8
Olimpia	2024–25	Liga Nacional	4	1	3	1	0	0	7	1
Olimpia	Total		174	20	6	1	18	3	198	24
Aris (loan)	2022–23	SLG	1	0	1	0	–		2	0
Career total			175	20	7	1	18	3	200	24

=== International ===
As of match played 6 September 2024

National team	Year	Apps	Goals
Honduras	2019	2	0
Honduras	2020	2	0
Honduras	2021	8	1
Honduras	2022	8	0
Honduras	2023	7	2
Honduras	2024	7	3
Total		34	6

List of international goals scored by Edwin Rodriguez
No.	Date	Venue	Opponent	Score	Result	Competition
1	6 June 2021	Empower Field at Mile High, Denver, United States	Costa Rica	1–1	2–2	2021 CONCACAF Nations League Finals
2	12 September 2023	Estadio Nacional Chelato Uclés, Tegucigalpa, Honduras	Grenada	1–0	4–0	2023–24 CONCACAF Nations League A
3	12 September 2023	Estadio Nacional Chelato Uclés, Tegucigalpa, Honduras	Grenada	4–0	4–0	2023–24 CONCACAF Nations League A
4	6 June 2024	Estadio Nacional Chelato Uclés, Tegucigalpa, Honduras	Cuba	2–1	3–1	2026 FIFA World Cup qualification
5	9 June 2024	Bermuda National Stadium, Devonshire Parish, Bermuda	Bermuda	3–1	6–1	2026 FIFA World Cup qualification
6	6 September 2024	Estadio Nacional Chelato Uclés, Tegucigalpa, Honduras	Trinidad and Tobago	3–0	4–0	2024–25 CONCACAF Nations League A

== Honours ==
Individual

- CONCACAF Champions League Team of the Tournament: 2020
- CONCACAF Men's Olympic Qualifying Tournament Best XI: 2020
- CONCACAF Nations League Finals Best XI: 2021
