= Alexy Vega =

Honduran footballer (born 1996)

Personal information
- Full name: Alexy Noel Vega Orellana
- Date of birth: 16 September 1996 (age 30)
- Place of birth: Jutiapa, Honduras
- Height: 1.75 m (5 ft 9 in)
- Positions: Attacking midfielder; forward

Team information
- Current team: Marathón
- Number: 17

Youth career
- Victoria

Senior career*
Years	Team	Apps	(Gls)
2015–2023	Victoria	85	(28)
2024–	Marathón	97	(43)

International career^{‡}
2023–	Honduras	12	(2)
- * Club domestic league appearances and goals as of 20:42, 28 July 2026 (UTC) ‡ National team caps and goals as of 10 September 2025

Alexy Noel Vega Orellana (born 16 September 1996) is a Honduran professional footballer who plays as an attacking midfielder or forward for Liga Nacional club Marathón and the Honduras national team.

== Early life ==
Vega was born in Jutiapa, Honduras, and raised in Cerro Colorado, a village located 25 kilometers from Balfate. In the absence of his parents, Vega was under the care of his grandmother, who also provided him with an education. Vega was always playing football from a very young age, and eventually tried out for Victoria, where he was discovered by former Honduras international Enrique Reneau.

== International career ==
He made his national debut for Honduras in a friendly match against Venezuela on June 15, 2023, Vega was also playing against Mexico at the 2023 CONCACAF Gold Cup.

Vega scored his first goal for Honduras on 10 June 2025 during a 2–0 win against Bermuda during 2026 FIFA World Cup qualification.

== Career statistics ==
=== International ===
As of match played 10 June 2025.

National team	Year	Apps	Goals
Honduras	2023	2	0
Honduras	2024	2	0
Honduras	2025	3	2
Total		7	2

Honduras score listed first, score column indicates score after each Vega goal.

List of international goals scored by Alexy Vega
No.	Date	Venue	Cap	Opponent	Score	Result	Competition	Ref.
1	10 June 2025	Estadio Nacional Chelato Uclés, Tegucigalpa, Honduras	6	Antigua and Barbuda	2–0	2–0	2026 FIFA World Cup qualification	
2	10 September 2025	Estadio Nacional Chelato Uclés, Tegucigalpa, Honduras	7	Nicaragua	2–0	2–0	2026 FIFA World Cup qualification	
