= CONCACAF League records and statistics =

Football competition statistics

This page details statistics of the CONCACAF League. These statistics concern all seasons since 2017.

== General performances ==
=== By club ===
Club	Winners	Runners-up	Years won	Years runner-up
(Honduras) Olimpia	2	0	2017, 2022	–
(Costa Rica) Saprissa	1	1	2019	2020
(Costa Rica) Alajuelense	1	1	2020	2022
(Costa Rica) Herediano	1	0	2018	–
(Guatemala) Comunicaciones	1	0	2021	–
(Honduras) Motagua	0	3	–	2018, 2019, 2021
(Costa Rica) Santos de Guápiles	0	1	–	2017

=== By nation ===
Country	Winners	Runners-up	Winning clubs	Runner-up clubs
Costa Rica	3	3	Herediano (1); Saprissa (1); Alajuelense (1)	Alajuelense (1); Santos de Guápiles (1); Saprissa (1)
Honduras	2	3	Olimpia (2)	Motagua (3)
Guatemala	1	0	Comunicaciones (1)	

=== All-time table ===
As of 14 November 2022

Pos	Team	Pld	W	D	L	GF	GA	GD	Pts
1	(Honduras) Olimpia	26	16	6	4	54	18	+36	54
2	(Honduras) Motagua	33	14	12	7	40	28	+12	54
3	(Costa Rica) Saprissa	18	13	1	4	41	19	+22	40
4	(Costa Rica) Santos de Guápiles	16	12	1	3	27	12	+15	37
5	(Guatemala) Comunicaciones	19	10	6	3	29	20	+9	36
6	(Costa Rica) Alajuelense	19	9	7	3	34	18	+16	34
7	(El Salvador) Alianza	19	9	2	8	26	20	+6	29
8	(Canada) Forge FC	15	7	6	2	22	16	+6	27
9	(Panama) Árabe Unido	12	7	1	4	16	8	+8	22
10	(Panama) Tauro	13	6	4	3	15	10	+5	22
11	(Costa Rica) Herediano	15	6	3	6	17	14	+3	21
12	(Honduras) Real España	10	4	4	2	14	10	+4	16
13	(Panama) Universitario (Note: Universitario was formerly known as Chorrillo.)	10	4	1	5	12	11	+1	13
14	(Nicaragua) Real Estelí	10	4	1	5	7	10	−3	13
15	(Honduras) Marathón	10	3	2	5	8	13	−5	11
16	(Nicaragua) Walter Ferretti	8	3	1	4	8	11	−3	10
17	(El Salvador) Águila	8	3	1	4	4	9	−5	10
18	(El Salvador) Santa Tecla	6	2	2	2	4	4	0	8
19	(Panama) Plaza Amador	8	2	2	4	5	13	−8	8
20	(Canada) Pacific	4	2	1	1	7	1	+6	7
21	(Guatemala) Municipal	5	2	1	2	12	7	+5	7
22	(Guatemala) Santa Lucía	4	2	0	2	7	7	0	6
23	(Jamaica) Portmore United	6	2	0	4	6	9	−3	6
24	(Panama) Independiente	7	1	3	3	5	8	−3	6
25	(El Salvador) FAS	7	1	3	3	8	12	−4	6
26	(Jamaica) Waterhouse	7	1	3	3	3	13	−10	6
27	(Panama) Sporting San Miguelito	4	1	2	1	5	3	+2	5
28	(Costa Rica) San Carlos	4	1	2	1	1	2	−1	5
29	(Haiti) Arcahaie	3	1	1	1	4	7	−3	4
30	(Nicaragua) Diriangén	8	1	1	6	5	18	−13	4
31	(Martinique) Club Franciscain	2	1	0	1	1	1	0	3
32	(Suriname) Robinhood	4	0	3	1	3	4	−1	3
33	(Guatemala) Antigua	4	0	3	1	2	3	−1	3
34	(Jamaica) Arnett Gardens	2	1	0	1	2	4	−2	3
35	(Guatemala) Guastatoya	6	0	3	3	5	8	−3	3
36	(El Salvador) Platense	2	0	2	0	2	2	0	2
37	(Haiti) Capoise	2	0	2	0	1	1	0	2
38	(Belize) Verdes	6	0	2	4	4	11	−7	2
39	(Nicaragua) Managua	4	0	2	2	3	10	−7	2
40	(Costa Rica) Pérez Zeledón	2	0	1	1	2	3	−1	1
41	(El Salvador) Once Deportivo	2	0	1	1	1	4	−3	1
42	(El Salvador) Municipal Limeño	1	0	0	1	1	2	−1	0
43	(Honduras) Platense	2	0	0	2	2	4	−2	0
44	Honduras Progreso	2	0	0	2	0	2	−2	0
45	(Guatemala) Malacateco	2	0	0	2	1	4	−3	0
46	(Costa Rica) Cartaginés	2	0	0	2	0	4	−4	0
47	(Trinidad and Tobago) Central	2	0	0	2	1	5	−4	0
48	(Puerto Rico) Metropolitan	2	0	0	2	1	5	−4	0
49	(Panama) Alianza	2	0	0	2	1	6	−5	0
50	(Trinidad and Tobago) San Juan Jabloteh	2	0	0	2	3	8	−5	0
51	(Dominican Republic) Cibao	2	0	0	2	0	6	−6	0
52	(Panama) San Francisco	3	0	0	3	1	7	−6	0
53	(Dominican Republic) Vega Real	2	0	0	2	0	9	−9	0
54	(Belize) Belmopan Bandits	6	0	0	6	3	14	−11	0
55	(Martinique) Samaritaine (Note: Samaritaine has withdrawn against Universitario.)	0	0	0	0	0	3**	—	0
56	(Suriname) Inter Moengotapoe (Note: Inter Moengotapoe and Olimpia were disqualified from the tournament by CONCACAF due to rule breaches following the first leg match.)	1	0	0	1	0	6**	—	0

=== Number of participations ===
A total of 56 clubs from 15 national associations participated in the CONCACAF League.

Nation	#	Clubs	Year
Panama (8)	4	Tauro	2018, 2019, 2020, 2022
Panama (8)	3	Independiente	2019, 2020, 2021
Panama (8)	3	Universitario (Note: Universitario was formerly known as Chorrillo.)	2017, 2018, 2021
Panama (8)	2	Árabe Unido	2017, 2018
Panama (8)	2	Plaza Amador	2017, 2021
Panama (8)	2	San Francisco	2019, 2020
Panama (8)	1	Alianza	2022
Panama (8)	1	Sporting San Miguelito	2022
Costa Rica (7)	4	Alajuelense	2017, 2020, 2021, 2022
Costa Rica (7)	4	Herediano	2018, 2019, 2020, 2022
Costa Rica (7)	3	Santos de Guápiles	2017, 2018, 2021
Costa Rica (7)	3	Saprissa	2019, 2020, 2021
Costa Rica (7)	1	Pérez Zeledón	2018
Costa Rica (7)	1	San Carlos	2019
Costa Rica (7)	1	Cartaginés	2022
El Salvador (7)	5	Alianza	2017, 2019, 2020, 2021, 2022
El Salvador (7)	3	FAS	2018, 2020, 2021
El Salvador (7)	3	Águila	2017, 2019, 2022
El Salvador (7)	2	Santa Tecla	2018, 2019
El Salvador (7)	1	Municipal Limeño	2020
El Salvador (7)	1	Once Deportivo	2021
El Salvador (7)	1	Platense	2022
Guatemala (6)	4	Comunicaciones	2019, 2020, 2021, 2022
Guatemala (6)	2	Antigua	2019, 2020
Guatemala (6)	2	Guastatoya	2019, 2021
Guatemala (6)	2	Municipal	2020, 2022
Guatemala (6)	1	Santa Lucía	2021
Guatemala (6)	1	Malacateco	2022
Honduras (6)	5	Motagua	2018, 2019, 2020, 2021, 2022
Honduras (6)	5	Olimpia	2017, 2019, 2020, 2021, 2022
Honduras (6)	3	Marathón	2019, 2020, 2021
Honduras (6)	2	Real España	2018, 2022
Honduras (6)	1	Honduras Progreso	2017
Honduras (6)	1	Platense	2017
Nicaragua (4)	5	Real Estelí	2017, 2019, 2020, 2021, 2022
Nicaragua (4)	3	Diriangén	2018, 2021, 2022
Nicaragua (4)	2	Managua	2019, 2020
Nicaragua (4)	2	Walter Ferretti	2017, 2018
Jamaica (3)	3	Waterhouse	2019, 2020, 2022
Jamaica (3)	2	Portmore United	2017, 2018
Jamaica (3)	1	Arnett Gardens	2018
Belize (2)	3	Belmopan Bandits	2017, 2018, 2019
Belize (2)	3	Verdes	2020, 2021, 2022
Canada (2)	3	Forge FC	2019, 2020, 2021
Canada (2)	1	Pacific FC	2022
Dominican Republic (2)	2	Cibao	2020, 2022
Dominican Republic (2)	1	Atlético Vega Real	2022
Haiti (2)	1	Arcahaie	2020
Haiti (2)	1	Capoise	2019
Martinique (2)	1	Club Franciscain	2018
Martinique (2)	1	Samaritaine	2021
Suriname (2)	1	Robinhood	2019
Suriname (2)	1	Inter Moengotapoe	2021
Trinidad and Tobago (2)	1	Central	2017
Trinidad and Tobago (2)	1	San Juan Jabloteh	2017
Puerto Rico (1)	1	Metropolitan	2021

=== By semi-final appearances ===
Team	No.	Years
(Honduras) Olimpia	4	**2017**, 2019, 2020, 2022
(Honduras) Motagua	4	**2018**, **2019**, **2021**, 2022
(Panama) Árabe Unido	2	2017, 2018
(Costa Rica) Saprissa	2	**2019**, **2020**
(Costa Rica) Alajuelense	2	**2020**, 2022
(Panama) Plaza Amador	1	2017
(Costa Rica) Santos de Guápiles	1	**2017**
(Costa Rica) Herediano	1	**2018**
(Panama) Tauro	1	2018
(El Salvador) Alianza	1	2019
(Haiti) Arcahaie	1	2020
(Guatemala) Guastatoya	1	2021
(Guatemala) Comunicaciones	1	**2021**
(Canada) Forge FC	1	2021
(Honduras) Real España	1	2022

Year in bold indicates team reached finals that season.

== Matches ==
=== Biggest home wins ===
6 goals:

- 5 November 2020: (Honduras) Olimpia 6–0 Managua (Nicaragua)
- 2 August 2022: (Canada) Pacific FC 6–0 Waterhouse (Jamaica)

5 goals:

- 22 January 2021: (Costa Rica) Saprissa 5–0 Arcahaie (Haiti)
- 4 August 2022: (Guatemala) Municipal 5–0 Atlético Vega Real (Dominican Republic)

4 goals:

- 1 August 2017: (Costa Rica) Santos de Guápiles 6–2 San Juan Jabloteh (Trinidad and Tobago)
- 1 August 2019: (El Salvador) Alianza 5–1 San Francisco (Panama)
- 18 August 2021: (Costa Rica) Santos de Guápiles 5–1 Verdes (Belize)

=== Biggest away wins ===
6 goals:

- 14 September 2017: (Panama) Plaza Amador 1–7 Olimpia (Honduras)
- 21 September 2021: (Suriname) Inter Moengotapoe 0–6 Olimpia (Honduras)

4 goals:

- 1 August 2018: (Nicaragua) Diriangén 0–4 Universitario (Panama)
- 30 August 2018: (Belize) Walter Ferretti 0–4 Tauro (Panama)
- 28 July 2022: (Dominican Republic) Atlético Vega Real 0–4 Municipal (Guatemala)

=== Biggest two leg wins ===
9 goals:

- 2022: (Guatemala) Municipal 9–0 Atlético Vega Real (Dominican Republic) (preliminary round)

6 goals:

- 2017: (Honduras) Olimpia 8–2 Plaza Amador (Panama) (quarter-finals)
- 2018: (Panama) Universitario 7–1 Diriangén (Nicaragua) (round of 16)
- 2018: (Panama) Tauro 7–1 Walter Ferretti (Nicaragua) (quarter-finals)
- 2022: (Canada) Pacific FC 6–0 Waterhouse (Jamaica) (preliminary round)

5 goals:

- 2017: (Costa Rica) Santos de Guápiles 8–3 San Juan Jabloteh (Trinidad and Tobago) (round of 16)
- 2019: (El Salvador) Alianza 6–1 San Francisco (Panama) (preliminary round)
- 2021: (Costa Rica) Santos de Guápiles 6–1 Verdes (Belize) (preliminary round)

=== Decided by penalty shoot-out ===
Final:

- 26 October 2017: (Costa Rica) Santos de Guápiles 1–1 agg. (1–4) Olimpia (Honduras)

Semi-finals:

- 20 January 2021: (Costa Rica) Alajuelense 0–0 (5–4) Olimpia (Honduras)

Quarter-finals:

- 1 December 2020: (Haiti) Arcahaie 1–1 (4–2) Forge FC (Canada)

Round of 16:

- 8 August 2017: (Nicaragua) Real Estelí 1–1 agg. (3–4) Águila (El Salvador)
- 9 August 2017: (Panama) Plaza Amador 1–1 agg. (5–4) Portmore United (Jamaica)
- 8 August 2018: (Belize) Walter Ferretti 1–1 agg. (4–1) Club Franciscain (Martinique)
- 9 August 2018: (Jamaica) Portmore United 3–3 agg. (7–6) Santos de Guápiles (Costa Rica)
- 27 August 2019: (Costa Rica) San Carlos 0–0 agg. (4–2) Santa Tecla (El Salvador)
- 29 August 2019: (Costa Rica) Herediano 2–2 agg. (6–7) Waterhouse
- 3 November 2020: (Honduras) Marathón 1–1 (4–3) Antigua GFC (Guatemala)
- 4 November 2020: (El Salvador) Alianza 1–1 (3–4) Motagua (Honduras)
- 29 September 2021: (Nicaragua) Real Estelí 2–2 (4–5) Marathón (Honduras)
- 23 August 2022: (Costa Rica) Herediano 1–1 (6–5) Pacific FC (Canada)

Preliminary round:

- 20 October 2020: (El Salvador) FAS 1–1 (4–5) Managua (Nicaragua)
- 21 October 2020: (Panama) Independiente 0–0 (2–4) Antigua GFC (Guatemala)
- 22 October 2020: (Honduras) Motagua 2–2 (15–14) Comunicaciones (Guatemala)

Play-off round:

- 9 December 2020: (Honduras) Motagua 2–2 (2–4) Real Estelí (Nicaragua)

=== Same nation encounters ===
- 2019: (Guatemala) Comunicaciones 2–1 agg. Guastatoya (Guatemala) (round of 16)
- 2020: (Honduras) Olimpia 2–0 Motagua (Honduras) (quarter-finals)
- 2020: (Costa Rica) Alajuelense 3–2 Saprissa (Costa Rica) (final)
- 2021: (Honduras) Marathón 0–4 Motagua (Honduras) (quarter-finals)
- 2021: (Guatemala) Comunicaciones 3–1 agg. Guastatoya (Guatemala) (semi-finals)
- 2022: (Panama) Sporting San Miguelito 1–2 agg. Tauro (Panama) (round of 16)
- 2022: (Honduras) Olimpia 1–0 agg. Motagua (Honduras) (semi-finals)

== Awards ==
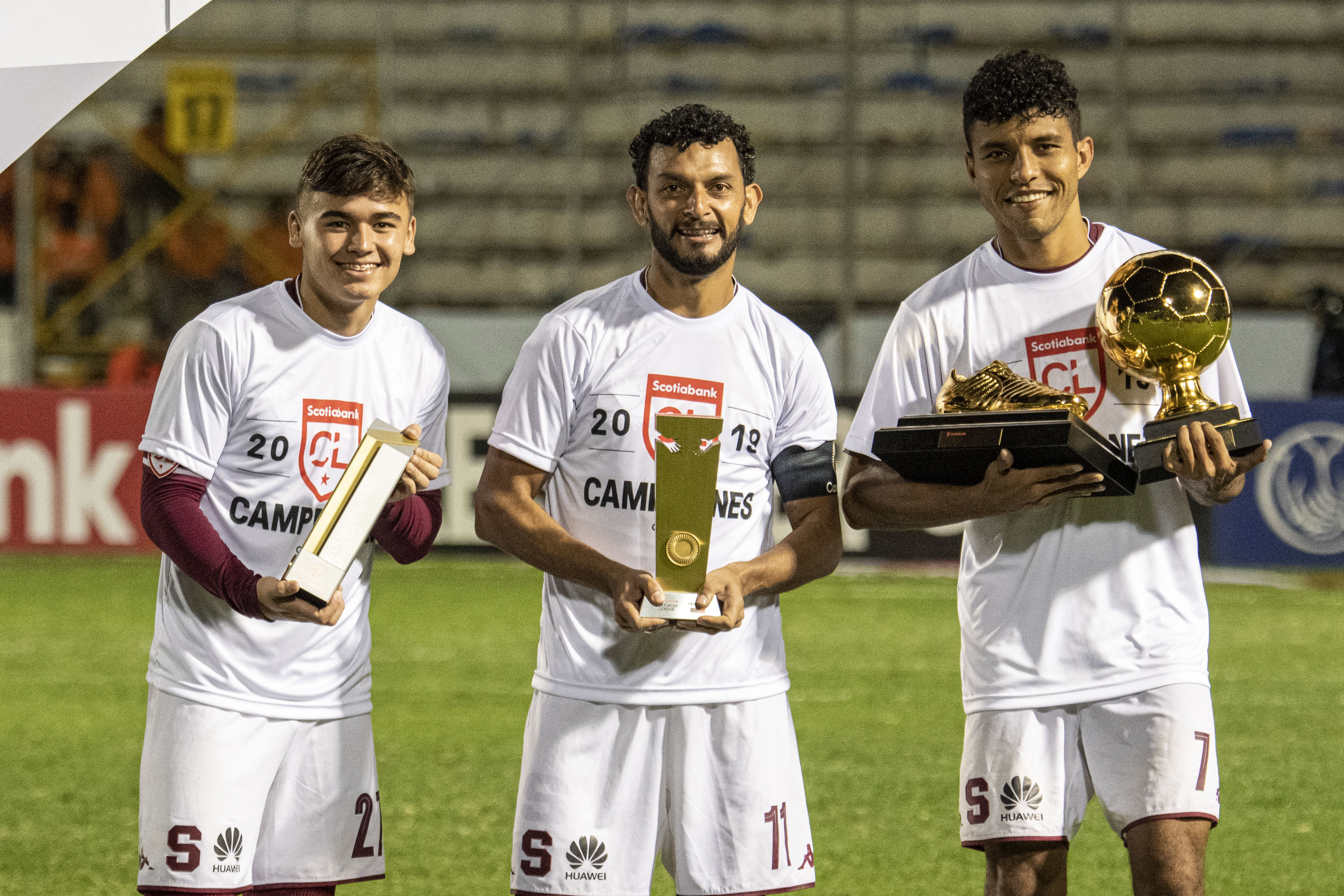
Saprissa players posing with various CONCACAF League awards following their victory in the 2019 final. From left to right: Best Young Player, Fair Play Award, Golden Boot and Golden Ball.

=== Golden Ball ===
- 2017: (Honduras) Michaell Chirinos (Olimpia)
- 2018: (Costa Rica) Yendrick Ruiz (Herediano)
- 2019: (Costa Rica) Johan Venegas (Saprissa)
- 2020: (Honduras) Alexander López (Alajuelense)
- 2021: (Ecuador) Juan Anangonó (Comunicaciones)
- 2022: (Honduras) Michaell Chirinos (Olimpia)

=== Golden Boot ===
- 2017: (Honduras) Roger Rojas (Olimpia, 5 goals)
- 2018: (Honduras) Román Castillo (Motagua, 5 goals)
- 2019: (Costa Rica) Johan Venegas (Saprissa, 7 goals)
- 2020: (Costa Rica) Johan Venegas (Saprissa, 6 goals)
- 2021: (Ecuador) Juan Anangonó, (Comunicaciones, 6 goals)
- 2022: (Argentina) Ramiro Rocca, (Real España, 6 goals)

=== Golden Glove ===
- 2017: (Costa Rica) Bryan Morales (Santos de Guápiles)
- 2018: (Costa Rica) Leonel Moreira (Herediano)
- 2019: (Argentina) Jonathan Rougier (Motagua)
- 2020: (Costa Rica) Leonel Moreira (Alajuelense)
- 2021: (Guatemala) Kevin Moscoso (Comunicaciones)
- 2022: (Costa Rica) Leonel Moreira (Alajuelense)

=== Best Young Player ===
- 2017: (Honduras) Kevin Álvarez (Olimpia)
- 2018: (Costa Rica) Jimmy Marín (Herediano)
- 2019: (Costa Rica) Manfred Ugalde (Saprissa)
- 2020: (Costa Rica) Fernán Faerron (Alajuelense)
- 2021: (Guatemala) Oscar Santis (Comunicaciones)
- 2022: (Costa Rica) Aarón Suárez (Alajuelense)

=== Fair Play Award ===
- 2017: (Costa Rica) Santos de Guápiles
- 2018: (Honduras) Motagua
- 2019: (Costa Rica) Saprissa
- 2020: (Costa Rica) Alajuelense
- 2021: (Guatemala) Comunicaciones
- 2022: (Costa Rica) Alajuelense

== See also ==
- CONCACAF Champions Cup and Champions League records and statistics
