= 2022 Caribbean Club Championship =

2022 CONCACAF Caribbean Club Championship
Tournament details
- Host country: Dominican Republic
- Dates: 13–25 May
- Teams: 6 (from 3 associations)

Final positions
- Champions: (Haiti) Violette (1st title)
- Runners-up: (Dominican Republic) Cibao
- Third place: (Dominican Republic) Atlético Vega Real
- Fourth place: (Jamaica) Waterhouse

Tournament statistics
- Matches played: 11
- Goals scored: 30 (2.73 per match)
- Top scorer(s): (Jamaica) Dwayne Atkinson (2 goals)
- Best player: (Haiti) Elyvens Déjean
- Best young player: (Haiti) Jeudi Stevenson
- Best goalkeeper: (Dominican Republic) Miguel Lloyd
- Fair play award: (Jamaica) Waterhouse

The 2022 Caribbean Club Championship was the 24th and final edition of the Caribbean Club Championship (also known as the CFU Club Championship), the first-tier annual international club football competition in the Caribbean region, held amongst clubs whose football associations are affiliated with the Caribbean Football Union (CFU), a sub-confederation of CONCACAF.

The winners of the 2022 CONCACAF Caribbean Club Championship qualified to the 2023 CONCACAF Champions League, the second and third place teams qualified to the 2022 CONCACAF League, while the fourth place team played against the winners of the 2022 CONCACAF Caribbean Club Shield in a playoff match to determine the final Caribbean spot to the 2022 CONCACAF League.

With the expansion of the CONCACAF Champions League starting from the 2024 edition, the 2022 edition of the Caribbean Club Championship was the last held. It was replaced by the Caribbean Cup, a regional cup tournament launched as a qualifying tournament to CONCACAF Champions League for teams from the Caribbean.

Cavaly won the previous tournament, but could not defend their title as they did not qualify for the tournament.

== Teams ==
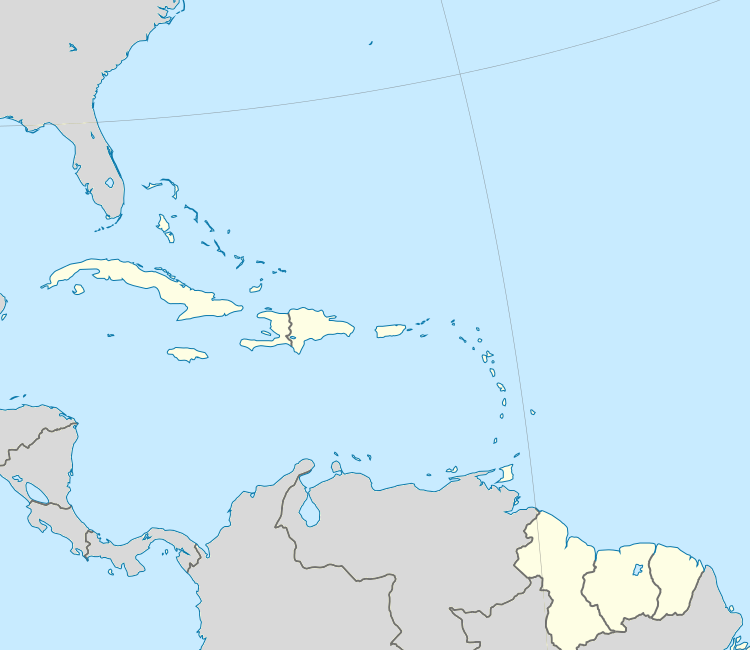
Location of teams of the 2022 CONCACAF Caribbean Club Championship
(H) Group stage host.

Among the 31 CFU member associations, four of them were classified as professional leagues and each may enter two teams in the CONCACAF Caribbean Club Championship.

Association	Team	Qualification method
Dominican Republic	Cibao	2021 Liga Dominicana de Fútbol champions
Dominican Republic	Atlético Vega Real	2021 Liga Dominicana de Fútbol runners-up
Haiti	Violette	2020 Ligue Haïtienne Série d'Ouverture champions
Haiti	Arcahaie	2020 Ligue Haïtienne Série d'Ouverture runners-up
Jamaica	Cavalier	2021 National Premier League champions
Jamaica	Waterhouse	2021 National Premier League runners-up

Association with professional league whose teams did not enter

- Trinidad and Tobago

== Group stage ==
The draw for the group stage was held on 3 February 2022, 11:00 EST (UTC−5), at the CONCACAF Headquarters in Miami, United States. The 6 teams were drawn into two groups of three teams. The two teams from the host association Dominican Republic, Cibao and Atlético Vega Real, were placed in Pot 1, the two teams from Haiti were placed in Pot 2, while the two teams from Jamaica were placed in Pot 3. This ensured that teams from the same association could not be drawn into the same group.

The winners and runners-up of each group advanced to the semi-finals.

All times local, AST (UTC−4).

=== Group A ===
Pos	Team	Pld	W	D	L	GF	GA	GD	Pts	Qualification
1	(Dominican Republic) Cibao (H)	2	1	1	0	6	3	+3	4	Knockout stage
2	(Haiti) Violette	2	1	0	1	3	5	−2	3	Knockout stage
3	(Jamaica) Cavalier	2	0	1	1	5	6	−1	1	

Source: CONCACAF
(H) Hosts
13 May 2022
20:00

Cibao (Dominican Republic)	3–0	(Haiti) Violette
Charles 9'; Nievas 57'; Parra 76'	Report

Estadio Cibao FC, Santiago
Referee: Reon Radix (Grenada)

15 May 2022
17:00

Violette (Haiti)	3–2	(Jamaica) Cavalier
Dejean 25', 71'; Georges 45+7'	Report	Webster 3', 63'

Estadio Cibao FC, Santiago
Referee: Alex Chilowicz (United States)

17 May 2022
17:00

Cibao (Dominican Republic)	3–3	(Jamaica) Cavalier
Díaz 52'; González 68'; Japa 74'	Report	Atkinson 29', 63'; Florencio 37' (o.g.)

Estadio Cibao FC, Santiago
Referee: Melvin Herrera (Honduras)

=== Group B ===
Pos	Team	Pld	W	D	L	GF	GA	GD	Pts	Qualification
1	(Jamaica) Waterhouse	2	1	1	0	2	0	+2	4	Knockout stage
2	(Dominican Republic) Atlético Vega Real (H)	2	1	1	0	2	1	+1	4	Knockout stage
3	(Haiti) Arcahaie	2	0	0	2	1	4	−3	0	

Source: CONCACAF
(H) Hosts
13 May 2022
17:00

Atlético Vega Real (Dominican Republic)	2–1	(Haiti) Arcahaie
Gedna 21'; Herrera 45+1'	Report	Bien-Aime 65'

Estadio Cibao FC, Santiago
Referee: Ken Pennyfeather (Antigua and Barbuda)

15 May 2022
20:00

Arcahaie (Haiti)	0–2	(Jamaica) Waterhouse
	Report	Moulton 23'; Grey 79'

Estadio Cibao FC, Santiago
Referee: Benjamín Whitty (Cayman Islands)

17 May 2022
20:00

Atlético Vega Real (Dominican Republic)	0–0	(Jamaica) Waterhouse
	Report

Estadio Cibao FC, Santiago
Referee: Moeth Gaymes (Saint Vincent and the Grenadines)

== Knockout stage ==
=== Bracket ===
The semi-final matchups were:

- Winner Group A vs. Runner-up Group B
- Winner Group B vs. Runner-up Group A

Semi-finals
19 May – Santiago
(Dominican Republic) Cibao	1
(Dominican Republic) Atlético Vega Real	0
19 May – Santiago
(Jamaica) Waterhouse	1
(Haiti) Violette	3

Final
22 May – Santiago
(Dominican Republic) Cibao	0 (3)
(Haiti) Violette (p)	0 (4)
Third place
22 May – Santiago
(Dominican Republic) Atlético Vega Real (p)	1 (3)
(Jamaica) Waterhouse	1 (1)

=== Semi-finals ===
19 May 2022
17:00

Cibao (Dominican Republic)	1–0	(Dominican Republic) Atlético Vega Real
Charles 12'	Report

Estadio Cibao FC, Santiago
Referee: Alex Chilowicz (United States)

19 May 2022
20:00

Waterhouse (Jamaica)	1–3	(Haiti) Violette
Moulton 8'	Report	Louima 21'; Jeudi 75', 87'

Estadio Cibao FC, Santiago
Referee: Melvin Herrera (Honduras)

=== Third-place match ===
Winners qualified for 2022 CONCACAF League. Losers advanced to CONCACAF League playoff against the 2022 CONCACAF Caribbean Club Shield winners for a place in the 2022 CONCACAF League.

22 May 2022
17:00

Atlético Vega Real (Dominican Republic)	1–1	(Jamaica) Waterhouse
Gómez 7'	Report	Benbow 49'
Penalties
Herrera (penalty scored); Jaquez (penalty missed); Peralta (penalty scored); Jimenez (penalty scored)	3–1	(penalty missed) Bradford; (penalty missed) Simpson; (penalty scored) Benbow; (penalty missed) Williams

Estadio Cibao FC, Santiago
Referee: Moeth Gaymes (Saint Vincent and the Grenadines)

=== Final ===
Winners qualified for 2023 CONCACAF Champions League. Losers qualified for 2022 CONCACAF League.

22 May 2022
20:00

Cibao (Dominican Republic)	0–0	(Haiti) Violette
	Report
Penalties
Díaz (penalty scored); Herold (penalty scored); López (penalty scored); Cristaldo (penalty missed); Heredia (penalty missed)	3–4	(penalty scored) Saba; (penalty scored) Déjean; (penalty scored) Vedrine; (penalty scored) Archelus

Estadio Cibao FC, Santiago
Attendance: 3,204
Referee: Reon Radix (Grenada)

Qualified teams from 2022 Caribbean club competitions
- CONCACAF Champions League: (Haiti) Violette
- CONCACAF League: (Dominican Republic) Cibao (Dominican Republic) Atlético Vega Real (Jamaica) Waterhouse

=== CONCACAF League playoff ===
The CONCACAF League playoff was played between the 2022 CONCACAF Caribbean Club Championship fourth-placed team and the 2022 CONCACAF Caribbean Club Shield winners, as long as the Shield winners comply with the minimum CONCACAF Club Licensing requirements for the CONCACAF League, with the winners qualifying for the 2022 CONCACAF League preliminary round.

25 May 2022
17:00

Waterhouse (Jamaica)	4–0	(Puerto Rico) Bayamón FC
Williams 67'; Leslie 78', 84', 87'	Report

Estadio Cibao FC, Santiago
Referee: Ken Pennyfeather (Antigua and Barbuda)

== See also ==
- 2022 Caribbean Club Shield
- 2022 CONCACAF League
- 2023 CONCACAF Champions League
