= Dany Jean =

Haitian footballer (born 2002)

Personal information
- Date of birth: 28 November 2002 (age 23)
- Place of birth: Port-au-Prince, Haiti
- Height: 1.68 m (5 ft 6 in)
- Position: Winger

Team information
- Current team: Torreense
- Number: 7

Youth career
- 2020: Aigle Noir
- 2021: Arcahaie

Senior career*
Years	Team	Apps	(Gls)
2021	Arcahaie	0	(0)
2021–2025	Strasbourg B	35	(9)
2022–2025	Strasbourg	2	(0)
2023–2024	→ Avranches (loan)	30	(2)
2024–2025	→ Rodez (loan)	16	(1)
2025–	Torreense	51	(9)

International career^{‡}
2019	Haiti U17	7	(1)
2018	Haiti U20	2	(0)
2021	Haiti U23	2	(0)
2022–	Haiti	23	(1)
- * Club domestic league appearances and goals as of 12 September 2026 ‡ National team caps and goals as of 22:28, 4 October 2026 (UTC)

Dany Jean (born 28 November 2002) is a Haitian professional footballer who plays as a winger for Liga Portugal 2 club Torreense and the Haiti national team.

== Club career ==
Orphaned at a young age, Jean is a youth product of the Haitian clubs Aigle Noir and Arcahaie, Jean moved to France signing a contract with Strasbourg on 21 July 2021. He began his senior career with their reserves, and made his first appearance on the senior bench in a Ligue 1 match against Nantes on 5 February 2022. He made his Ligue 1 debut for Strasbourg on 6 August 2022 against Monaco.

On 28 June 2023, Jean joined Avranches on a season-long loan.

On 7 August 2024, Jean joined Ligue 2 club Rodez on a season-lonh loan.

On 31 January 2025, Jean signed a two-and-a-half-year contract with Torreense in Portugal.

== International career ==
Jean is a former youth international for Haiti, having represented the Haiti U17 at the 2019 FIFA U-17 World Cup. He debuted with the senior Haiti national team in a friendly 2–1 loss to Guatemala on 27 March 2022.

== Career statistics ==
=== Club ===
As of match played 12 September 2026

Appearances and goals by club, season and competition
Club	Season	League			Cup		Continental		Other		Total	
Club	Season	Division	Apps	Goals	Apps	Goals	Apps	Goals	Apps	Goals	Apps	Goals
Arcahaie	2020–21	Ligue Haïtienne	0	0	0	0	1 (Note: Appearance in CONCACAF Champions Cup)	0	—		1	0
Strasbourg B	2021–22	CFA 2	18	3	—		—		—		18	3
Strasbourg B	2021–22	CFA 2	17	6	—		—		—		17	6
Strasbourg B	Total		35	9	—		—		—		35	9
Strasbourg	2022–23	Ligue 1	2	0	0	0	—		—		2	0
Avranches (loan)	2023–24	Ligue 3	30	2	0	0	—		—		30	2
Rodez (loan)	2024–25	Ligue 2	16	1	0	0	—		—		16	1
Torreense	2024–25	Liga Portugal 2	14	2	—		—		—		14	2
Torreense	2025–26	Liga Portugal 2	31	5	6	1	—		2 (Note: Appearances in promotion play-offs)	0	39	6
Torreense	2026–27	Liga Portugal 2	6	2	0	0	1 (Note: Appearances in UEFA Europa League)	0	1 (Note: Appearance in Supertaça Cândido de Oliveira)	0	8	2
Torreense	Total		51	9	6	1	1	0	3	0	61	10
Career total			134	21	6	1	2	0	3	0	145	22

=== International ===
As of match played 4 October 2026

Appearances and goals by national team and year
National team	Year	Apps	Goals
Haiti	2022	5	1
Haiti	2023	1	0
Haiti	2024	7	0
Haiti	2025	6	0
Haiti	2026	4	0
Total		23	1

== Honours ==
Torreense

- Taça de Portugal: 2025–26
