= Guerry =

Guerry may refer to:

- André-Michel Guerry (1802–1866), French statistician
- Guerry et Bourguignon, French automobile
- Guerry Romondt (born 1985), Haitian footballer
- Michel Guerry (born 1932), French politician
- William A. Guerry (1861–1928), American theologian
- Zan Guerry (born 1949), American tennis player

== See also ==
- Helen de Guerry Simpson (1897–1940), Australian writer and politician
- Tragedy of the Guerry's wells
