= Óscar Santis =

Guatemalan footballer (born 1999)

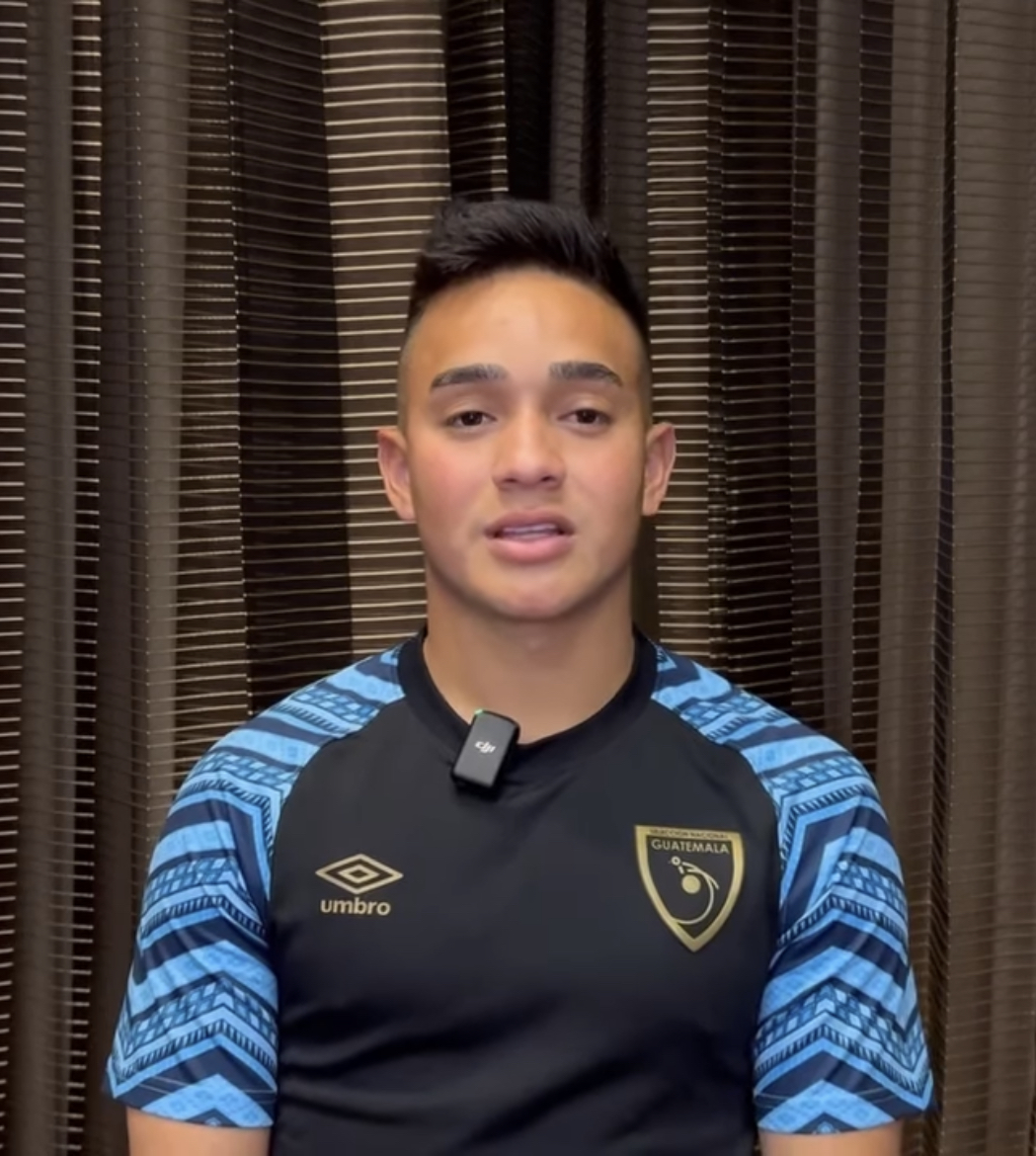
- Santis with Guatemala in 2024

Personal information
- Full name: Óscar Alexander Santis Cayax
- Date of birth: 25 March 1999 (age 27)
- Place of birth: Mazatenango, Guatemala
- Height: 1.72 m (5 ft 8 in)
- Position: Forward

Team information
- Current team: DPMM FC (on loan from Antigua)
- Number: 18

Youth career
- 2014–2017: Suchitepéquez

Senior career*
Years	Team	Apps	(Gls)
2015–2019	Suchitepéquez	23	(0)
2019–2022	Comunicaciones	109	(28)
2022–2024	Antigua	32	(7)
2024	Dinamo Tbilisi	29	(3)
2025–	Antigua	56	(16)
2026–	→ DPMM (loan)	5	(1)

International career^{‡}
2018	Guatemala U20	4	(2)
2021–	Guatemala	61	(22)
- * Club domestic league appearances and goals as of 12:05, 31 October 2026 (UTC) ‡ National team caps and goals as of 17:20, 16 November 2026 (UTC)

Óscar Alexander Santis Cayax (Spanish pronunciation: [ˈoskaɾ ˌaleksandˈeɾ sˈantis kajjˈaks]; born 25 March 1999), commonly known as Lelito, is a Guatemalan professional footballer who plays as a forward for Malaysia Super League club DPMM FC and the Guatemala national team.

== Club career ==
=== Suchitepéquez ===
Oscar Santis started his senior career with Liga Nacional de Fútbol de Guatemala club Suchitepéquez coming from the youth side. He would make his senior debut on 4 October 2015 in a 3–1 league win against Antigua at the age of 16.

=== Comunicaciones ===
Oscar Santis signed with Comunicaciones on 2019.

During the 2021 CONCACAF League, Santis was a member of the Comunicaciones squad that ultimately won the tournament. Santis had 10 appearances and three goals in the tournament, which were scored in a hat-trick against Deportivo Saprissa in the first leg of the quarter-finals. He was named the best young player of the tournament.

=== Antigua ===
Santis signed with Liga Nacional de Fútbol de Guatemala club Antigua on 2022, at the end of the 2022–23 Apertura season from Comunicaciones. Santis tallied 32 goals in 124 appearances across all competitions, winning the 2021 CONCACAF League and Liga Nacional de Guatemala 2021–22 Clausura with Comunicaciones.

=== Dinamo Tbilisi ===
In January 2024, Oscar Santis signed with Georgia’s Erovnuli Liga club Dinamo Tbilisi on a two-year contract with a possibility of extension. On 2 March 2024, Santis made his Erovnuli Liga debut for Dinamo Tbilisi resulting in a win. On 3 April 2024, Santis made his first contribution to a goal in Europe, assisting teammate Vakhtang Salia in a 2–2 league draw against Dila Gori. Santis would score his first European goal against FC Iberia 1999 on 10 May 2024, in which the match resulted in a 1–0 win at home. On 11 July 2024, Oscar Santis would participate with Dinamo Tbilisi in a 2024–25 UEFA Conference League match against FK Mornar, becoming the third Guatemalan to participate in a UEFA tournament. He played the entire match and recorded an assist in a 2–1 defeat. He would finish his 2024 season with 32 appearances and 3 goals across all competitions.

=== Return to Antigua ===
On 26 December 2024, Antigua and Oscar Santis announced that he will be joining the team once again on loan for the 2024–25 Liga Nacional de Guatemala Clausura. On 1 February 2025, after a 0–0 draw against Marquense, a video of Santis shouting racist insults towards the fans went viral on social media. He later apologized for the incident.

=== Loan to DPMM ===
In July 2026, Santis was unveiled as having signed for Bruneian club DPMM FC of the Malaysia Super League for the 2026–27 season, on loan from Antigua. The club had set their sights on Santis since April. He made his DPMM debut on 23 August in a 0–1 victory against Penang. On 30 October 2026, he was brought on in stoppage time and scored with his first touch in a 3–1 win against Negeri Sembilan.

== International career ==
=== Youth career ===
Santis debuted internationally on his youth team with the Guatemala U-20 team on 2 November 2018, and scored his first goal for the team against Guyana in the 2018 CONCACAF U-20 Championship in a 4–0 victory.

=== Senior career ===
On 24 February 2021, he made his senior debut in a friendly match against Nicaragua in a 1–0 victory. On 4 June 2021, at the 2022 World Cup qualifying match against St. Vincent and the Grenadines, Santis scored his first senior goal for Guatemala in a 10–0 victory.

Oscar Santis was not selected for Guatemala's 2023 CONCACAF Gold Cup squad due to an injury.

On 6 June 2025, Santis had four goal contributions in a 4–2 win against Dominican Republic in the 2026 FIFA World Cup qualification. He recorded an assist and scored a hat-trick that would earn him man of the match.

Santis competed in the 2025 CONCACAF Gold Cup. In the quarterfinal against Canada, Santis completed a cross to Rubio Rubin in the 69th minute. The game would end 1–1, with Guatemala advancing on penalty kicks. Guatemala would later lose 2–1 in the semifinal against the United States.

== Personal life ==
Oscar Santis has a younger brother, Diego Santis, who is also a footballer.

== Career statistics ==
=== Club ===
As of match played 8 November 2026

Appearances and goals by club, season and competition
Club	Season	League			Domestic Cup (Note: Includes Georgian Cup and Malaysia FA Cup)		Continental		Other		Total	
Club	Season	Division	Apps	Goals	Apps	Goals	Apps	Goals	Apps	Goals	Apps	Goals
Suchitepéquez	2015-16	Liga Nacional de Guatemala	1	0	—		—		—		1	0
Suchitepéquez	2016-17	Liga Nacional de Guatemala	10	0	—		—		—		10	0
Suchitepéquez	2017-18	Liga Nacional de Guatemala	12	0	—		—		—		12	0
Suchitepéquez	Total		23	0	0	0	0	0	0	0	23	0
Comunicaciones	2019-20	Liga Nacional de Guatemala	2	0	—		—		—		2	0
Comunicaciones	2020-21	Liga Nacional de Guatemala	35	10	—		—		—		35	10
Comunicaciones	2021-22	Liga Nacional de Guatemala	46	11	—		10 (Note: Appearance(s) in CONCACAF League)	3	—		56	14
Comunicaciones	2022-23	Liga Nacional de Guatemala	26	7	—		5 (Note: Two appearances and one goal in 2022 CONCACAF League, three appearances in 2022 CONCACAF Champions League)	1	—		31	8
Comunicaciones	Total		109	28	0	0	15	4	0	0	124	32
Antigua	2022-23	Liga Nacional de Guatemala	15	5	—		—		—		15	5
Antigua	2023-24	Liga Nacional de Guatemala	17	2	—		—		—		17	2
Antigua	Total		32	7	0	0	0	0	0	0	32	7
Dinamo Tbilisi	2024	Erovnuli Liga	29	3	1	0	2 (Note: Appearance(s) in UEFA Conference League)	0	2 (Note: Appearance(s) in Georgian Super Cup)	0	34	3
Antigua	2024-25	Liga Bantrab	23	7	0	0	2 (Note: Appearance(s) in CONCACAF Champions Cup)	1	0	0	25	8
Antigua	2025-26	Liga Bantrab	33	9	0	0	3 (Note: Appearance(s) in CONCACAF Central American Cup)	2	0	0	36	11
Antigua	Total		56	16	0	0	5	3	0	0	61	19
DPMM	2026–27	Malaysia Super League	5	1	3	0	—		0 (Note: Appearance(s) in Malaysia Cup)	0	8	1
Career Total			254	55	4	0	22	7	2	0	282	62

=== International ===
As of match played 16 November 2026

Appearances and goals by national team and year
National team	Year	Apps	Goals
Guatemala	2021	9	1
Guatemala	2022	11	5
Guatemala	2023	8	3
Guatemala	2024	10	2
Guatemala	2025	16	7
Guatemala	2026	7	4
Total		61	22

As of match played 16 November 2026
Scores and results list Guatemala's goal tally first, score column indicates score after each Santis goal.

List of international goals scored by Oscar Santis
No.	Date	Venue	Cap	Opponent	Score	Result	Competition	Ref.
1	4 June 2021	Estadio Doroteo Guamuch Flores, Guatemala City, Guatemala	3	Saint Vincent and the Grenadines	3–0	10–0	2022 FIFA World Cup qualification	
2	24 April 2022	PayPal Park, San Jose, United States	11	El Salvador	2–0	4–0	Friendly	
3	24 April 2022	PayPal Park, San Jose, United States	11	El Salvador	3–0	4–0	Friendly	
4	10 June 2022	Félix Sánchez Olympic Stadium, Santo Domingo, Dominican Republic	15	Dominican Republic	1–1	1–1	2022–23 CONCACAF Nations League B	
5	24 September 2022	Red Bull Arena, Harrison, United States	17	Colombia	1–4	1–4	Friendly	
6	19 November 2022	Dignity Health Sports Park, Carson, United States	20	Nicaragua	2–0	3–1	Friendly	
7	24 March 2023	FFB Stadium, Belmopan, Belize	22	Belize	2–0	2–1	2022–23 CONCACAF Nations League B	
8	10 September 2023	Estadio Doroteo Guamuch Flores, Guatemala City, Guatemala	26	Panama	1–1	1–1	2023–24 CONCACAF Nations League A	
9	13 October 2023	Hasely Crawford Stadium, Port of Spain, Trinidad and Tobago	27	Trinidad and Tobago	2–0	2–3	2023–24 CONCACAF Nations League A	
10	11 October 2024	Synthetic Track and Field Facility, Leonora, Guyana	37	Guyana	1–0	3–1	2024–25 CONCACAF Nations League A	
11	11 October 2024	Synthetic Track and Field Facility, Leonora, Guyana	37	Guyana	3–1	3–1	2024–25 CONCACAF Nations League A	
12	6 June 2025	Estadio Cementos Progreso, Guatemala City, Guatemala	43	Dominican Republic	1–0	4–2	2026 FIFA World Cup qualification	
13	6 June 2025	Estadio Cementos Progreso, Guatemala City, Guatemala	43	Dominican Republic	3–2	4–2	2026 FIFA World Cup qualification	
14	6 June 2025	Estadio Cementos Progreso, Guatemala City, Guatemala	43	Dominican Republic	4–2	4–2	2026 FIFA World Cup qualification	
15	16 June 2025	Dignity Health Sports Park, Carson, United States	44	Jamaica	1–0	1–0	2025 CONCACAF Gold Cup	
16	9 September 2025	Rommel Fernández Stadium, Panama City, Panama	50	Panama	1–0	1–1	2026 FIFA World Cup qualification	
17	14 October 2025	Cuscatlán Stadium, San Salvador, El Salvador	52	El Salvador	1–0	1–0	2026 FIFA World Cup qualification	
18	18 November 2025	Estadio El Trébol, Guatemala City, Guatemala	54	Suriname	3–0	3–1	2026 FIFA World Cup qualification	
19	25 September 2026	Independence Park, Kingston, Jamaica	58	Jamaica	1–0	2–3	2026–27 CONCACAF Nations League A	
20	25 September 2026	Independence Park, Kingston, Jamaica	58	Jamaica	2–2	2–3	2026–27 CONCACAF Nations League A	
21	13 November 2026	Manuel Felipe Carrera Stadium, Guatemala City, Guatemala	60	Canada	1–3	2–3	2026–27 CONCACAF Nations League A	
22	16 November 2026	BMO Field, Toronto, Canada	61	Canada	1–0	1–4	2026–27 CONCACAF Nations League A	

== Honours ==
Comunicaciones

- CONCACAF League: 2021
- Liga Bantrab: 2022 Clausura

Dinamo Tbilisi

- Georgian Cup runner-up: 2024
- Georgian Super Cup runner-up: 2024

Antigua

- Liga Bantrab: 2025 Clausura, 2025 Apertura

Individual

- CONCACAF League Best Young Player: 2021
- CONCACAF Gold Cup Best XI: 2025

== Notes ==
1. National Football Teams awards a goal to Santis on 21 March 2025 against Guyana, however CONCACAF awards this goal to José Martínez.
