= Alex Chilowicz =

American association football referee (born 1987)

- Born: December 3, 1987 (age 38); New Jersey, United States
- Other occupation: Musician

Domestic
Years	League	Role
2009–2022	NCAA	Referee
2013–2017	United Soccer League	Referee
2014–2017	NASL	Referee
2017–2023	Major League Soccer	VAR
2017–2023	Major League Soccer	Referee
2023–	English Football League	Referee
2024–	Premier League	VAR

International
Years	League	Role
2022	CONCACAF	Referee

Alex Chilowicz (born December 3, 1987) is an American association football referee working in the English Football League since 2023. He was previously employed by PRO and officiated in Major League Soccer (MLS) between 2017 and 2023.

== Career ==
In 2014, Chilowicz was named Referee of the Year by the New Jersey Soccer Association.

Chilowicz officiated college soccer for many years, beginning as early as 2009 until as late as 2022. He was the referee for a round of 16 match between USC and Utah in the 2016 NCAA Division I women's soccer tournament.

Chilowicz debuted as a referee in Major League Soccer on August 19, 2017, taking charge of a match between the Colorado Rapids and D.C. United in Commerce City. In a career spanning seven seasons, Chilowicz was the referee for 106 regular-season MLS matches and served as VAR for 62 regular-season matches. He was the VAR for the 2018 MLS All-Star Game and fourth official for MLS Cup 2020.

In May 2022, Chilowicz refereed at the 2022 Caribbean Club Championship in the Dominican Republic. On June 10, 2022, Chilowicz refereed his first competitive match between senior national teams, taking charge of a CONCACAF Nations League B match between Saint Vincent and the Grenadines and Trinidad and Tobago in Arnos Vale.

Following the 2023 Major League Soccer season, the English Football League announced that Chilowicz had relocated to England and would become a National Group official. On December 23, 2023, he became one of the first non-British referees to take charge of a Football League match, refereeing a League Two fixture between Sutton United and Mansfield Town. (Note: Australian native Jarred Gillett began officiating in the EFL in 2019.) On April 1, 2024, Chilowicz refereed his first EFL Championship match, a 2–1 win for Rotherham United against Millwall at New York Stadium.

On August 27, 2024, Chilowicz refereed his first match at a Premier League stadium when he took charge of the EFL Cup tie between Brighton and Hove Albion and Crawley Town. The match was marked by a controversial incident early in the game, when a challenge by Jay Williams on Brighton's Matt O'Riley resulted in a serious injury for O'Riley. Chilowicz was criticized for not booking or sending off Williams for the foul.

Chilowicz has received praise from Steve Evans for his decision-making and communication skills.

== Personal life ==
Chilowicz was raised in Wayne, New Jersey, and played soccer at Wayne Hills High School, graduating in 2006. His father Dan is a former teacher and soccer coach at Clifton High School.

Chilowicz attended the Jazz Studies program at William Paterson University and the Institute of Jazz Studies at Rutgers University–Newark. He plays the saxophone. Outside of refereeing, Chilowicz works as a musician, with credits in television and film as well as on Broadway.
