= 2021–22 Honduran Liga Nacional =

2021–22 in Honduran football

Liga Nacional
- Season: 2021–22
- Dates: 26 September 2021–May 2022
- Champions: Apertura: C.D. Olimpia; Clausura: F.C. Motagua
- Relegated: Platense
- CONCACAF League: C.D Olimpia; F.C.Motagua; Real C.D. España
- Matches: 166
- Goals: 492 (2.96 per match)
- Top goalscorer: TBD (23)
- Biggest home win: OLI 7–0 HNP (12 May 2021)
- Biggest away win: RSO 1–6 VID (1 November 2020)
- Highest scoring: RSO 1–6 VID (1 November 2020)
- Longest unbeaten run: OLI (14)
- Longest losing run: RSO (5); MAR (5)
- All statistics correct as of 20 July 2021.

The 2021–22 Honduran Liga Nacional season was the 56th Honduran Liga Nacional edition since its establishment in 1965. The tournament started in September 2021 and is scheduled to end in mid 2022. The season is divided into two halves (Apertura and Clausura), each crowning one champion. Due to the impact of the COVID-19 pandemic on association football, a new and more compact format is to be used. The first stage was shortened from 18 to 14 weeks. The tournament is divided into two groups of five. The top teams of each group advance directly to the semifinal round, and the teams finishing 2nd and 3rd from each group have to play a playoff round. At the end of the season, the three teams with the best record qualify to the 2022 CONCACAF League.

== 2021–22 teams ==
A total of 10 teams will contest the tournament, the same that participated in the 2019–20 season since no relegation was implemented.

Team	Location	Stadium	Capacity
Honduras Progreso	El Progreso	Estadio Humberto Micheletti	5,000
Marathón	San Pedro Sula	Estadio Yankel Rosenthal	15,000
Motagua	Tegucigalpa	Estadio Tiburcio Carías Andino	35,000
Olimpia	Tegucigalpa	Estadio Tiburcio Carías Andino	35,000
Platense	Puerto Cortés	Estadio Excélsior	7,910
Real España	San Pedro Sula	Estadio Francisco Morazán	26,781
Real Sociedad	Tocoa	Estadio Francisco Martínez Durón	3,000
UPNFM	Choluteca	Estadio Emilio Williams Agasse	8,000
Victoria	La Ceiba	Estadio Nilmo Edwards	18,000
Vida	La Ceiba	Estadio Nilmo Edwards	18,000

== Apertura ==
Pos	Team	Pld	W	D	L	GF	GA	GD	Pts	Qualification or relegation
1	Olimpia	18	14	2	2	37	12	+25	44	Advance to Pentagonal and Final
2	Marathón	18	12	4	2	39	17	+22	40	Advance to Pentagonal
3	Motagua	18	9	4	5	26	21	+5	31	Advance to Pentagonal
4	UPNFM	18	7	5	6	24	23	+1	26	Advance to Pentagonal
5	Vida	18	7	4	7	24	24	0	25	Advance to Pentagonal
6	Real de Minas	18	7	2	9	25	29	−4	23	
7	Real España	18	5	7	6	26	25	+1	22	
8	Platense	18	6	3	9	28	36	−8	21	
9	Real Sociedad	18	2	4	12	12	30	−18	10	
10	Honduras Progreso	18	3	1	14	12	36	−24	10	

Updated to match(es) played on 20 November 2019. Source: Soccerway
Rules for classification: 1) points; 2) goal difference; 3) number of goals scored.

=== Championship Playoffs ===
- Qualified teams
  - Real España
  - Vida
  - Olimpia
  - Motagua
  - UPNFM
  - Marathón

== Clausura ==
=== Championship Playoffs ===
- Qualified teams
  - Real España
  - Olimpia
  - Victoria
  - Motagua
  - Vida
  - Marathón
- Final teams
  - Real España
  - Motagua

== List of Foreign Players ==
This is a list of foreign players in the 2021–22 season. The following players:

1. Have played at least one game for the respective club.
2. Have not been capped for the Honduras national football team on any level, independently from the birthplace

Honduras Progreso

- (Colombia) Andres Salazar
- (Colombia) Oidel Perez
- (Ecuador) Richard Mercado
- (Panama) Leslie Heraldez

Marathón

- (Argentina) Braian Molina
- (Argentina) Juan Vieyra
- (Argentina) Lucas Campana
- (Colombia) Santiago Córdoba

Motagua

- (Argentina) Jonathan Rougier
- (Argentina) Lucas Baldunciel
- (Paraguay) Roberto Moreira

Olimpia

- (Colombia) Yustin Arboleda Buenaños

Platense

- (Argentina) Francisco Del Riego
- (Argentina) Federico Maya
- (Argentina) Álvaro Klusener

Real España

- (Argentina) Ramiro Rocca
- (Belize) Carlos Bernárdez
- (Costa Rica) Heyreel Saravia
- (Mexico) Omar Rosas

Real Sociedad

- (Cuba) Nelson Johnston
- (Grenada) Jamal Charles
- (Trinidad and Tobago) Akeem Roach

UPNFM

- (Colombia)

Victoria

- (Colombia) Luis Orlando Hurtado
- (Cuba) Yaudel Lahera

Vida

- (Brazil) Patryck Ferreira
- (Chile) Marcos Velásquez
- (Colombia) Rafael Agámez
- (Spain) Victor Blasco

(player released during the Apertura season) (player released between the Apertura and Clausura seasons) (player released during the Clausura season) (player naturalised for the Clausura season)
