= Garden City FC =

Belizean football club

- Full name: Garden City Football Club
- Founded: 2021
- League: FFB Top League

Garden City FC is a Belizean football team which currently competes in the FFB Top League. The team is based in Belmopan.
