= Caesar Ridge FC =

Belizean football club

- Full name: Caesar Ridge Football Club
- League: FFB Top League

Caesar Ridge FC is a Belizean football team which currently competes in the FFB Top League. The team have previously competed in amateur level competitions in the country, and are based in Belize City.
