= 2021–22 FFB Top League =

FFB Top League
- Season: 2021–2022
- Dates: 23 October 2021 – 24 April 2022
- Champions: Opening: Verdes; Closing: Verdes
- CONCACAF League: Verdes
- Matches played: 60
- Goals scored: 181 (3.02 per match)
- Top goalscorer: Opening: Krisean Lopez; Junior Vargas; Sean Young (7 goals); Closing: Juan Carlos Lopez; Krisean Lopez; Andres Orozco (5 goals)
- Longest winning run: Opening: 9 matches Verdes; Closing: 9 matches Verdes
- Longest unbeaten run: Opening: 10 matches Verdes; Closing: 10 matches Verdes
- Longest winless run: Opening: 10 matches Caesar Ridge; Closing: 8 matches Caesar Ridge
- Longest losing run: Opening: 6 matches Caesar Ridge; Closing: 6 matches Caesar Ridge

The 2021–22 FFB Top League was the inaugural and only season of the FFB Top League, sanctioned by the Football Federation of Belize (FFB), taking over from the Premier League of Belize (PLB) as the highest competitive football league in Belize. There were two seasons spread over two years, the opening (played towards the end of 2021) and the closing (played at the beginning of 2022).

The FFB Top League was put in place by the FFB due to the PLB being subject to restrictions mandated by the Supreme Court of Belize. The formation of the league will fulfil the requirement made by FIFA to restart football in Belize, as well as protecting the participating berth for the FFB for the 2022 CONCACAF League.

The FFB expected to only administer the 2021–22 tournament, providing that the PLB legal matters will be resolved during this time.

== Teams ==
Six teams were successful in meeting all of the requirements to compete in the inaugural season. From the 2019–20 Premier League of Belize closing season, four teams joined the opening season of the FFB Top League. These were Altitude, San Pedro Pirates, Verdes and Wagiya. The additional two teams were made up of Caesar Ridge from Belize City, who previously competed in amateur level competitions in the country, and Garden City, a newly formed team from Belmopan.

On 17 October 2021 the most successful team in the PLB era, Belmopan Bandits, released a statement confirming that they will not participate in the FFB Top League. The Bandits refused to sign a participation agreement created by the FFB, citing several reasons.

For the opening season, all games were played at the Isidoro Beaton Stadium in Belmopan with no fans in attendance, due to the COVID-19 pandemic. For the closing season, games were played at various stadiums around the country, including the FFB Stadium in Belmopan. 500 fully vaccinated fans were allowed to attend per game.

Team	City
Altitude	Independence
Caesar Ridge	Belize City
Garden City	Belmopan
San Pedro Pirates	San Pedro
Verdes	San Ignacio
Wagiya	Dangriga

== Opening season ==
The team that accumulates the most points at the end of the ten rounds of games will be crowned as the opening season champion. The opening season commenced on 23 October 2021.

=== League table ===
Pos	Team	Pld	W	D	L	GF	GA	GD	Pts	
1	Verdes (C)	10	9	1	0	34	8	+26	28	Qualification for the 2022 CONCACAF League
2	Altitude	10	6	2	2	20	9	+11	20	
3	San Pedro Pirates	10	4	3	3	11	9	+2	15	
4	Garden City	10	4	1	5	14	15	−1	13	
5	Wagiya	10	1	3	6	12	19	−7	6	
6	Caesar Ridge	10	0	2	8	9	40	−31	2	

Source: Soccerway
(C) Champions

=== Results ===
Home \ Away	ALT	CAE	GAR	SPE	VER	WAG
Altitude		5–2	2–0	1–0	0–2	2–1
Caesar Ridge	0–6		2–3	1–2	0–3	1–3
Garden City	1–2	1–1		1–0	1–3	5–2
San Pedro Pirates	0–0	3–0	2–0		1–1	0–0
Verdes	3–2	13–1	1–0	3–0		3–2
Wagiya	0–0	1–1	0–2	2–3	1–2	

Source: Soccerway
Legend: Blue = home team win; Yellow = draw; Red = away team win.

=== Season statistics ===
==== Top scorers ====
Rank	Player	Team	Goals
1	(Belize) Krisean Lopez	Verdes	7
1	(Paraguay) Junior Vargas	Verdes	7
1	(Belize) Sean Young	Caesar Ridge	7
4	(Colombia) Dayro Gomez	Wagiya	5
4	(Belize) Jordy Polanco	Verdes	5
4	(Belize) Ashley Torres	Altitude	5
4	(Belize) Luis Torres	Altitude	5
4	(Mexico) Edwin Villeda	Verdes	5

==== Hat-tricks ====
Player	For	Against	Result	Date
(Paraguay) Junior Vargas	Verdes	Caesar Ridge	13–1 (H)	24 October 2021
(Belize) Krisean Lopez^{4}	Verdes	Caesar Ridge	13–1 (H)	24 October 2021

Notes

^{4} Player scored 4 goals

=== Awards ===
The individual awards for the opening season were announced after the final game on 19 December 2021.

Award	Recipient	Team
Most Goals	(Belize) Krisean Lopez	Verdes
Most Goals	(Paraguay) Junior Vargas	Verdes
Most Goals	(Belize) Sean Young	Caesar Ridge
MVP	(Belize) Krisean Lopez	Verdes
Best Young Player	(Belize) Wilfredo Galvez	Garden City
Best Forward	(Belize) Sean Young	Caesar Ridge
Best Midfielder	(Belize) Jordy Polanco	Verdes
Best Defender	(Belize) Asrel Sutherland	San Pedro Pirates
Best Goalkeeper	(Belize) Woodrow West	Verdes
Best Coach	(Spain) David Pérez Asensio	Verdes
Best Manager	(Belize) Lorin Frazer	Verdes

== Closing season ==
The format will be the same as the opening season, with the team that accumulates the most points at the end of the ten rounds of games being crowned as the closing season champion. The closing season commenced on 5 February 2022.

=== League table ===
Pos	Team	Pld	W	D	L	GF	GA	GD	Pts	
1	Verdes (C)	10	9	1	0	28	2	+26	28	Qualification for the 2022 CONCACAF League
2	Altitude	10	5	3	2	15	8	+7	18	
3	San Pedro Pirates	10	5	2	3	15	7	+8	17	
4	Garden City	10	2	3	5	7	19	−12	9	
5	Caesar Ridge	10	2	1	7	9	26	−17	7	
6	Wagiya	10	1	2	7	7	19	−12	5	

Updated to match(es) played on 24 April 2022. Source: Soccerway
(C) Champions

=== Results ===
Home \ Away	ALT	CAE	GAR	SPE	VER	WAG
Altitude		1–1	2–0	4–2	0–0	3–0
Caesar Ridge	0–2		0–1	0–3	0–7	4–3
Garden City	2–2	1–2		0–0	0–4	1–1
San Pedro Pirates	1–0	1–0	6–0		0–1	1–1
Verdes	2–0	5–1	2–1	1–0		5–0
Wagiya	0–1	2–1	0–1	0–1	0–1	

Updated to match(es) played on 24 April 2022. Source: Soccerway
Legend: Blue = home team win; Yellow = draw; Red = away team win.

=== Season statistics ===
==== Top scorers ====
Rank	Player	Team	Goals
1	(Mexico) Juan Carlos Lopez	Verdes	5
1	(Belize) Krisean Lopez	Verdes	5
1	(Colombia) Andres Orozco	Altitude	5
4	(Belize) Jovaunn Ramos	Verdes	4
5	(Belize) Horace Avila	San Pedro Pirates	3
5	(Belize) Mario Chimal	San Pedro Pirates	3
5	(Belize) Moises Hernandez	San Pedro Pirates	3
5	(Belize) Warren Moss	Wagiya	3
5	(Mexico) Edwin Villeda	Verdes	3
5	(Belize) Sean Young	Garden City	3
