= 2021–22 Liga FPD =

Liga FPD
- Season: 2021–22
- Dates: 27 July 2021 – 6 July 2022
- Champions: Apertura: Herediano; Clausura: Cartaginés
- Relegated: Jicaral
- CONCACAF League: Herediano; Cartaginés; Alajuelense

The 2021–22 Liga FPD season, also known as Liga Promérica for sponsorship reasons, was the 101st season since its establishment. The tournament was divided into two championships, the Apertura and Clausura, each in an identical format and each contested by 12 teams.

== Apertura ==
=== Regular season ===
Pos	Team	Pld	W	D	L	GF	GA	GD	Pts	Qualification or relegation
1	Herediano	22	14	3	5	35	17	+18	45	Advance to playoffs and (if necessary) grand final
2	Alajuelense	22	12	5	5	42	24	+18	41	Advance to playoffs
3	Santos de Guápiles	22	10	6	6	45	34	+11	36	Advance to playoffs
4	Saprissa	22	9	7	6	40	22	+18	34	Advance to playoffs
5	Cartaginés	22	10	4	8	30	28	+2	34	
6	Grecia	22	8	5	9	29	26	+3	29	
7	Sporting San José	22	7	6	9	30	37	−7	27	
8	San Carlos	22	5	9	8	28	34	−6	24	
9	Pérez Zeledón	22	6	6	10	21	29	−8	24	
10	Guanacasteca	22	6	6	10	21	35	−14	24	
11	Guadalupe	22	4	9	9	18	34	−16	21	
12	Jicaral	22	4	8	10	19	38	−19	20	

Updated to match(es) played on unknown. Source: RSSSF
Rules for classification: 1) points; 2) goal difference; 3) goals scored; 4) head-to-head points; 5) head-to-head goal difference; 6) head-to-head goals scored; 7) draw

=== Playoffs ===
==== Semi-finals ====
First leg

1 December 2021
20:00

Saprissa	3–0	Herediano
Sinclair 9'; Marín 39'; Pemberton 90+1'

Estadio Ricardo Saprissa Aymá, San José
Referee: Cristian Rodríguez

2 December 2021
19:00 CST

Santos de Guápiles	3–2	Alajuelense
Paradela 2', 52'; Barquero 22'		15' (o.g.) Meneses; 90+3' Venegas

Estadio Ebal Rodríguez, Guápiles
Attendance: 50
Referee: Adrián Chinchilla

Second leg

5 December 2021
19:30

Herediano	1–0	Saprissa
Rocha 8'

Estadio Eladio Rosabal Cordero, Heredia
Attendance: 100
Referee: David Gómez

Saprissa won 3–1 on aggregate.

5 December 2021
16:00 CST

Alajuelense	1–0	Santos de Guápiles
Torres 14'

Estadio Alejandro Morera Soto, Alajuela
Attendance: 100
Referee: Hugo Cruz

3–3 on aggregate, Alajuelense progress on away goals rule.

==== Final ====
First leg

9 December 2021
18:00

Saprissa	2–1	Alajuelense
Bolaños 45'; Marín 64'		35' Torres

Estadio Ricardo Saprissa Aymá, San José
Attendance: 50
Referee: Benjamín Pineda

Second leg

12 December 2021
17:00

Alajuelense	0–0	Saprissa

Estadio Alejandro Morera Soto, Alajuela
Attendance: 5,000
Referee: Pedro Navarro

Saprissa won 2–1 on aggregate.

==== Grand final ====
First leg

16 December 2021
18:00

Saprissa	0–1	Herediano
		87' (pen.) Basulto

Estadio Ricardo Saprissa Aymá, San José
Attendance: 8,000
Referee: David Gómez

Second leg

19 December 2021
17:00

Herediano	3–2	Saprissa
Bolaños 45+3' (o.g.); Tejeda 81'; Franco 89'		28', 46' Bolaños

Estadio José Joaquín "Colleya" Fonseca, San José
Attendance: 8,000
Referee: Juan Gabriel Calderón

Herediano won 4–2 on aggregate.

== Clausura ==
=== Regular season ===
Pos	Team	Pld	W	D	L	GF	GA	GD	Pts	Qualification or relegation
1	Alajuelense	22	13	3	6	36	19	+17	42	Advance to playoffs and (if necessary) grand final
2	Herediano	22	9	9	4	32	19	+13	36	Advance to playoffs
3	Cartaginés	22	10	4	8	45	36	+9	34	Advance to playoffs
4	Saprissa	22	10	4	8	30	30	0	34	Advance to playoffs
5	San Carlos	22	9	7	6	31	31	0	34 (Note: San Carlos ranked below all other clubs with equal number of points due to sanctions for having a suspended member of staff in the technical area in round 10.)	
6	Sporting San José	22	8	6	8	29	28	+1	30	
7	Guadalupe	22	8	5	9	32	37	−5	29	
8	Santos de Guápiles	22	7	5	10	28	31	−3	26	
9	Grecia	22	7	5	10	26	31	−5	26	
10	Jicaral	22	6	7	9	25	35	−10	25	
11	Pérez Zeledón	22	5	8	9	25	29	−4	23	
12	Guanacasteca	22	5	7	10	23	36	−13	22	

Updated to match(es) played on unknown. Source: RSSSF
Rules for classification: 1) points; 2) goal difference; 3) goals scored; 4) head-to-head points; 5) head-to-head goal difference; 6) head-to-head goals scored; 7) draw

=== Playoffs ===
==== Semi-finals ====
First leg

19 June 2022

Cartaginés	1–0	Herediano
Vargas 18'

Estadio José Rafael Fello Meza Ivankovich, Cartago
Referee: Hugo Cruz

19 June 2022

Saprissa	1–1	Alajuelense
Waston 83'		60' Venegas

Estadio Ricardo Saprissa Aymá, San José
Referee: Josué Ugalde

Second leg

21 June 2022

Herediano	1–1	Cartaginés
Rojas 28'		66' Venegas

Estadio José Joaquín "Colleya" Fonseca, San José
Referee: Benjamín Pineda

22 June 2022

Alajuelense	3–1 (a.e.t.)	Saprissa
Mora 47'; González 102'; Góndola 117'		Marín 71'

Estadio Alejandro Morera Soto, Alajuela
Referee: Pedro Navarro

==== Final ====
First leg

26 June 2022

Cartaginés	0–0	Alajuelense

Estadio José Rafael Fello Meza Ivankovich, Cartago
Referee: Adrián Chinchilla

Second leg

30 June 2022

Alajuelense	1–1	Cartaginés
Briceño 70' (o.g.)		85' Hernández

Estadio Alejandro Morera Soto, Alajuela
Referee: Hugo Cruz

==== Grand final ====
First leg

3 July 2022

Cartaginés	1–0	Alajuelense
Venegas 90+2'

Estadio José Rafael Fello Meza Ivankovich, Cartago
Referee: Keylor Herrera

Second leg

6 July 2022

Alajuelense	1–1 (a.e.t.)	Cartaginés
Gamboa 58'		105' Campos

Estadio Alejandro Morera Soto, Alajuela
Referee: Benjamín Pineda

== Aggregate table ==
Pos	Team	Pld	W	D	L	GF	GA	GD	Pts	Qualification or relegation
1	Alajuelense	44	25	8	11	78	43	+35	83	Qualified for 2022 CONCACAF League preliminary round as non-champions with best regular season record
2	Herediano	44	23	12	9	67	36	+31	81	Qualified for 2022 CONCACAF League round of 16 as Apertura champions
3	Saprissa	44	19	11	14	70	52	+18	68	
4	Cartaginés	44	20	8	16	75	64	+11	68	Qualified for 2022 CONCACAF League round of 16 as Clausura champions
5	Santos de Guápiles	44	17	11	16	73	65	+8	62	
6	San Carlos	44	14	16	14	59	65	−6	58	
7	Sporting San José	44	15	12	17	59	65	−6	57	
8	Grecia	44	15	10	19	55	57	−2	55	
9	Guadalupe	44	12	14	18	50	71	−21	50	
10	Pérez Zeledón	44	11	14	19	46	58	−12	47	
11	Guanacasteca	44	11	13	20	44	71	−27	46	
12	Jicaral	44	10	15	19	44	73	−29	45	Relegated to Segunda División de Costa Rica

Updated to match(es) played on unknown. Source: RSSSF
Rules for classification: 1) points; 2) goal difference; 3) goals scored; 4) head-to-head points; 5) head-to-head goal difference; 6) head-to-head goals scored; 7) draw
