= Reon Radix =

Grenadian football referee

- Full name: Reon Radix
- Born: 1990 or 1991 (age 35–36); St. David Parish, Grenada

Domestic
Years	League	Role
2010–present	GFA Premier League	Referee

International
Years	League	Role
2018–present	FIFA	Referee
2017–present	CONCACAF	Referee

Reon Radix (born 1990 or 1991) is a Grenadian football referee, who has been FIFA-listed since 2018, and one of two FIFA-listed central referees from Grenada as of 2025, the other being Joseph Bedeau.

== Career ==
Radix began his career as a referee in 2010, by overseeing matches at the local GFA Premier League, Grenada's top flight category.

In January 2017, Radix, who had been working as a teacher at the St David's Catholic Secondary School in Saint David Parish, was selected by CONCACAF to attend an intensive two-phase training to choose 14 referees of excellency to represent the confederation. The course took place in Toluca, Mexico, and was organized by the Mexican Football Federation. At the time of being chosen by CONCACAF, Radix was pursuing a career as a national long distance athlete.

At CONCACAF level, he has led games for the qualification for the 2022 FIFA World Cup, with matches between notable national teams, as in October 2021, when he refereed a 4–1 United States victory over Jamaica national football team. The subsequent year, Radix was again chosen by CONCACAF to attend a prestigious Referee Academy at the Dallas Cup, where he was appointed to officiate U-19 matches. Radix has also refereed matches for the CONCACAF qualification for the 2026 FIFA World Cup.

Among Radix's most important CONCACAF performances are the third-place match of the 2019–20 CONCACAF Nations League between Honduras and Costa Rica, which ended in a Honduran victory on penalties. He also oversaw the final game between Cibao FC and Violette AC at the 2022 Caribbean Club Championship. In the same year, Radix took part in the CONCACAF U-20 Championship, and performed in four CONCACAF Gold Cup editions; first as a sponsored referee for training at the 2019 tournament, followed by a main role at the 2021 Gold Cup, as a support referee in the 2023 tournament in Canada and the US, and again in a supporting role in 2025. For this last edition, Radix also whistled games during the qualification process.

== Selected performances ==
Date	Match	Result	Round	Tournament
6 June 2021	Honduras – Costa Rica	2–2 (5–4)	Third-place match	2019–20 CONCACAF Nations League
8 October 2021	United States – Jamaica	2–0	Qualification game	2022 FIFA World Cup qualification (CONCACAF)
22 May 2022	Cibao FC (Dominican Republic) – (Haiti) Violette AC	0–0	Final	2022 Caribbean Club Championship
