= Dairín González =

Colombian footballer (born 1990)

Personal information
- Full name: Dairin González Mosquera
- Date of birth: 4 June 1990 (age 36)
- Place of birth: Istmina, Colombia
- Height: 1.93 m (6 ft 4 in)
- Position: Centre back

Senior career*
Years	Team	Apps	(Gls)
2012–2013	Deportivo Rionegro	44	(2)
2014	Fortaleza	32	(0)
2015–2016	América de Cali	31	(0)
2016	Deportes Quindío	9	(0)
2017	La Equidad	29	(0)
2018	Atlético Bucaramanga	11	(0)
2019	Club Deportivo Guabirá	4	(0)
2019–2020	Unión Magdalena	6	(0)
2021	Deportivo Alemán	?	(?)
2021	Košice	11	(0)
- * Club domestic league appearances and goals as of 20:07, 11 January 2022 (UTC)

Dairin González (born 4 June 1990), is a Colombian footballer who last played for FC Košice as a defender.
