= 2020–21 Ligue Haïtienne =

Ligue Haïtienne
- Season: 2020–21
- Champions: Ouverture: Violette AC; Clôture: TBD

The 2020–21 Ligue Haïtienne season is the 58th season of top-tier football in Haiti. It began on 5 September 2020 and ended in July 2021. The league Championnat National Haïtien Professionnel is split into two tournaments—the Série d'Ouverture and the Série de Clôture—each with identical formats and each contested by the same 18 teams.

== Teams ==
- America des Cayes
- Arcahaie FC
- AS Capoise
- AS Cavaly
- AS Mirebalais
- Baltimore SC
- Cosmopolites SC
- Don Bosco FC
- FC Juventus des Cayes
- FICA
- Ouanaminthe FC
- Racing Club Haïtien
- Racing Gônaïves FC
- Real Hope FA
- Tempête FC
- Triomphe Liancourt FC
- US Rivartibonitienne
- Violette AC

== Série d'Ouverture ==
=== Regular season ===
==== Standings ====
Pos	Team	Pld	W	D	L	GF	GA	GD	Pts	Qualification
1	Arcahaie FC	17	9	3	5	20	10	+10	30	Qualification to the Semifinals
2	Baltimore SC	17	8	6	3	12	5	+7	30	Qualification to the Semifinals
3	Triomphe Liancourt FC	17	9	3	5	17	15	+2	30	Qualification to the Quarterfinals
4	AS Capoise	17	7	6	4	16	12	+4	27	Qualification to the Quarterfinals
5	Racing Club Haïtien	17	8	3	6	17	14	+3	27	Qualification to the Quarterfinals
6	Violette AC	17	5	10	2	18	13	+5	25	Qualification to the Quarterfinals
7	Cavaly AS	17	7	4	6	16	14	+2	25	
8	America des Cayes	17	7	4	6	16	15	+1	25	
9	Real Hope FA	17	6	5	6	21	15	+6	23	
10	Tempête FC	17	6	4	7	18	15	+3	22	
11	FC Juventus des Cayes	17	6	4	7	12	16	−4	22	
12	US Rivartibonitienne	17	5	5	7	15	22	−7	20	
13	Don Bosco FC	17	4	7	6	20	21	−1	19	
14	Ouanaminthe FC	17	4	6	7	11	18	−7	18	
15	Cosmopolites SC	17	4	6	7	13	23	−10	18	
16	FICA	17	2	11	4	17	16	+1	17	
17	Racing FC (Note: Racing Gônaïves FC had 1 point deducted for lining up a suspended player in round 7)	17	3	7	7	12	18	−6	16	
18	AS Mirebalais	17	2	8	7	10	19	−9	14	

Source: RSSSF
Rules for classification: 1) points; 2) goal difference; 3) number of goals scored.

=== Playoffs ===
Quarterfinals
4	AS Capoise	3	1	4
5	Racing Club Haïtien	2	1	3
3	Triomphe Liancourt FC	0	2	2
6	Violette AC	3	1	4

Semifinals
1	Arcahaie FC	0	0	0 (2)
4	AS Capoise	0	0	0 (0)
2	Baltimore SC	0	0	0
6	Violette AC	1	1	2

Final
1	Arcahaie FC	1	0	1
6	Violette AC	2	3	5

==== Quarterfinals ====
The matches were played on December 23 and 27, 2020.

Team 1	Agg.	Team 2	1st leg	2nd leg
Violette AC	4–2	Triomphe Liancourt FC	3–0	1–2
Racing Club Haïtien	3–4	AS Capoise	2–3	1–1

==== Semifinals ====
The matches were played on December 30, 2020, and January 3, 2021.

Team 1	Agg.	Team 2	1st leg	2nd leg
AS Capoise	0–0; 0-2 (p)	Arcahaie FC	0–0	0–0
Violette AC	2–0	Baltimore SC	1–0	1–0

==== Finals ====
The matches were played on January 6 and 10, 2021.

Team 1	Agg.	Team 2	1st leg	2nd leg
Violette AC	3–1	Arcahaie FC	2–1	1–0

== Aggregate table ==
Pos	Team	Pld	W	D	L	GF	GA	GD	Pts	Qualification
1	Arcahaie FC	17	9	3	5	20	10	+10	30	Qualification for 2022 Caribbean Club Championship
2	Baltimore SC	17	8	6	3	12	5	+7	30	
3	Triomphe Liancourt FC	17	9	3	5	17	15	+2	30	
4	AS Capoise	17	7	6	4	16	12	+4	27	
5	Racing Club Haïtien	17	8	3	6	17	14	+3	27	
6	Violette AC	17	5	10	2	18	13	+5	25	Qualification for 2022 Caribbean Club Championship
7	Cavaly AS	17	7	4	6	16	14	+2	25	
8	America des Cayes	17	7	4	6	16	15	+1	25	
9	Real Hope FA	17	6	5	6	21	15	+6	23	
10	Tempête FC	17	6	4	7	18	15	+3	22	
11	FC Juventus des Cayes	17	6	4	7	12	16	−4	22	
12	US Rivartibonitienne	17	5	5	7	15	22	−7	20	
13	Don Bosco FC	17	4	7	6	20	21	−1	19	
14	Ouanaminthe FC	17	4	6	7	11	18	−7	18	
15	Cosmopolites SC	17	4	6	7	13	23	−10	18	
16	FICA	17	2	11	4	17	16	+1	17	Relegation to 2021-22 Championnat National D2
17	Racing FC (Note: Racing Gônaïves FC had 1 point deducted for lining up a suspended player in round 7)	17	3	7	7	12	18	−6	16	Relegation to 2021-22 Championnat National D2
18	AS Mirebalais	17	2	8	7	10	19	−9	14	Relegation to 2021-22 Championnat National D2

Source: RSSSF
Rules for classification: 1) points; 2) goal difference; 3) number of goals scored.
