= 2022 CONCACAF League =

6th edition of the CONCACAF League

2022 Scotiabank CONCACAF League

Tournament details
- Dates: 26 July – 2 November
- Teams: 22 (from 10 associations)

Final positions
- Champions: (Honduras) Olimpia (2nd title)
- Runners-up: (Costa Rica) Alajuelense

Tournament statistics
- Matches played: 42
- Goals scored: 94 (2.24 per match)
- Top scorer(s): (Argentina) Ramiro Rocca (6 goals)
- Best player: (Honduras) Michaell Chirinos
- Best young player: (Costa Rica) Aarón Suárez
- Best goalkeeper: (Costa Rica) Leonel Moreira
- Fair play award: (Costa Rica) Alajuelense

The 2022 CONCACAF League (officially the 2022 Scotiabank CONCACAF League for sponsorship purposes) was the sixth and final edition of the CONCACAF League, a football club competition organized by CONCACAF, the regional governing body of North America, Central America, and the Caribbean.

Olimpia defeated Alajuelense in the final to win their second CONCACAF League title. As winners, they and the next best five teams qualified for the 2023 CONCACAF Champions League. Comunicaciones were the title holders, but were eliminated by Diriangén in the Round of 16.

== Qualification ==
A total of 22 teams participated in the CONCACAF League:

- North American Zone: 1 team (from one association)
- Central American Zone: 18 teams (from seven associations)
- Caribbean Zone: 3 teams (from two or three associations)

Therefore, teams from either 10 or 11 out of the 41 CONCACAF member associations may participate in the CONCACAF League.

=== North America ===
The one berth for the North American Zone (NAFU) was allocated to the Canadian Soccer Association through the previous year's Canadian Premier League. The league champion, decided by the Canadian Premier League Finals contested between the two semifinal winners, qualified. They are the second Canadian representative included in CONCACAF competitions, besides the Canadian Championship champions which qualify for the CONCACAF Champions League.

=== Central America ===
The 18 berths for the Central American Football Union (UNCAF), which consists of seven member associations, were allocated as follows: three berths for each of Costa Rica, El Salvador, Guatemala, Honduras, Panama, two berths for Nicaragua, and one berth for Belize.

All of the leagues of Central America employ a split season with two tournaments in one season, so the following teams qualified for the CONCACAF League:

- In the league of Costa Rica, both champions, and the non-champions with the best Clausura record, qualified. If there was any team which were champions of both tournaments, the non-champions with the second best Clausura record qualified.
- In the leagues of El Salvador, Guatemala, Honduras, and Panama, both champions, and the runners-up with the better aggregate record (or any team which are runners-up of both tournaments), qualify. If there is any team which are finalists of both tournaments, the runners-up with the worse aggregate record qualify. If there are any two teams which are finalists of both tournaments, the semi-finalists with the best aggregate record qualify.
- In the league of Nicaragua, both champions qualify. If there is any team which are champions of both tournaments, the runners-up with the better aggregate record (or any team which are runners-up of both tournaments) qualify.
- In the league of Belize, the champions with the better aggregate record (or any team which are champions of both tournaments) qualify.

If teams from any Central American associations were excluded, they would be replaced by teams from other Central American associations, with the associations chosen based on results from previous CONCACAF League and CONCACAF Champions League tournaments.

=== Caribbean ===
The three berths for the Caribbean Football Union (CFU), which consists of 31 member associations, were allocated via the CONCACAF Caribbean Club Championship and CONCACAF Caribbean Club Shield, the first-tier and second-tier subcontinental Caribbean club tournaments. Since 2018, the CONCACAF Caribbean Club Championship is open to teams from professional leagues, where they can qualify as champions or runners-up of their respective association's league in the previous season, while the CONCACAF Caribbean Club Shield is open to teams from non-professional leagues, where they can qualify as champions of their respective association's league in the previous season.

Besides the champions of the CONCACAF Caribbean Club Championship which qualified for the CONCACAF Champions League, the runners-up and third-placed team of the CONCACAF Caribbean Club Championship, and the winners of a playoff between the fourth-placed team of the CONCACAF Caribbean Club Championship and the champions of the CONCACAF Caribbean Club Shield, qualified for the CONCACAF League. For the champions of the CONCACAF Caribbean Club Shield to be eligible for the playoff, they were required to comply with the minimum CONCACAF Club Licensing requirements for the CONCACAF League.

== Teams ==
Location of teams of the 2022 CONCACAF League
North American Zone

The following 22 teams (from eleven associations) qualified for the tournament.

- Ten teams enter in the round of 16: two each from Costa Rica, Honduras, and Panama, and one each from El Salvador, Guatemala, Nicaragua, and the Caribbean.
- Twelve teams enter in the preliminary round: two each from El Salvador, Guatemala, and the Caribbean, and one each from Canada, Costa Rica, Honduras, Panama, Nicaragua, and Belize.
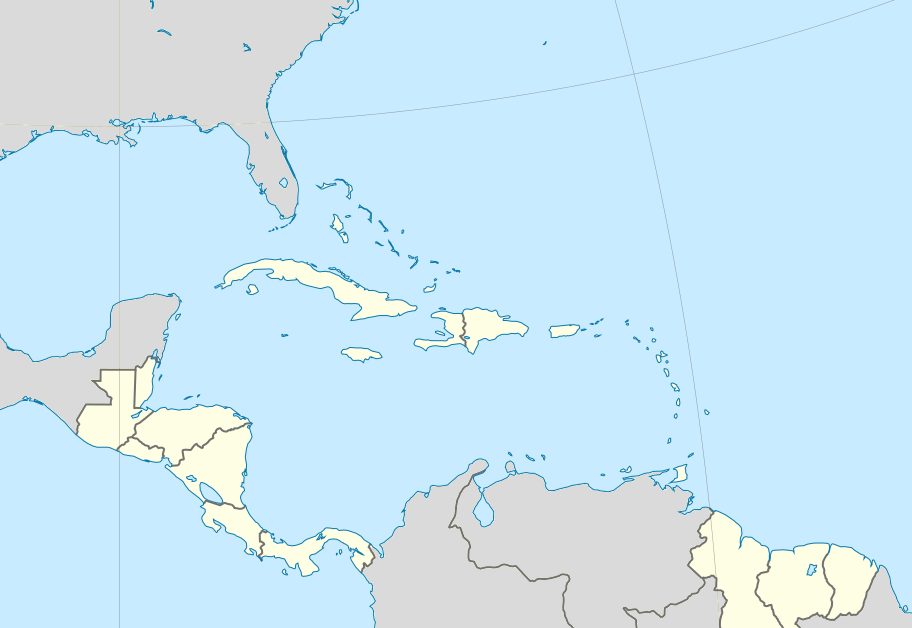
Location of teams of the 2022 CONCACAF League
Central American Zone Caribbean Zone
Teams in bold enter in the round of 16

Qualified teams from North America (1 team: entering in Preliminary Round)
Association	Team	Entry round	Qualifying method	App. (last)	Previous best (last)
Canada (1 PR berth)	Pacific FC	Preliminary round	2021 Canadian Premier League champions	1st	Debut

Qualified teams from Central America (18 teams: 9 entering in Round of 16, 9 entering in Preliminary Round)
Association	Team	Entry round	Qualifying method	App. (last)	Previous best (last)
Costa Rica (3 berths: 2 R16 + 1 PR)	Herediano	Round of 16	Champions with better 2021–22 aggregate record (2021 Apertura)	4th (2020)	**Champions (2018)**
Costa Rica (3 berths: 2 R16 + 1 PR)	Cartaginés	Round of 16	Champions with worse 2021–22 aggregate record (2022 Clausura)	1st	Debut
Costa Rica (3 berths: 2 R16 + 1 PR)	Alajuelense	Preliminary round	Non-champions with best regular season record in 2021 Clausura	4th (2021)	**Champions (2020)**
Honduras (3 berths: 2 R16 + 1 PR)	Olimpia	Round of 16	2021 Apertura champions	5th (2021)	**Champions (2017)**
Honduras (3 berths: 2 R16 + 1 PR)	Motagua	Round of 16	2022 Clausura champions	5th (2021)	Runners-up (2019)
Honduras (3 berths: 2 R16 + 1 PR)	Real España	Preliminary round	2021 Apertura and 2022 Clausura runners-up	2nd (2018)	Round of 16 (2018)
Panama (3 berths: 2 R16 + 1 PR)	Tauro	Round of 16	Champions with better 2021–22 aggregate record (2021 Clausura)	4th (2021)	Semi-finals (2018)
Panama (3 berths: 2 R16 + 1 PR)	Alianza	Round of 16	Champions with worse 2021–22 aggregate record (2022 Apertura)	1st	Debut
Panama (3 berths: 2 R16 + 1 PR)	Sporting San Miguelito	Preliminary round	Non-champions with best 2021–22 aggregate record (2022 Apertura)	1st	Debut
El Salvador (3 berths: 1 R16 + 2 PR)	Alianza	Round of 16	Champions with better 2021–22 aggregate record (2021 Apertura)	4th (2021)	Semi-finals (2019)
El Salvador (3 berths: 1 R16 + 2 PR)	Águila	Preliminary round	Champions with worse 2021–22 aggregate record (2022 Clausura)	3rd (2019)	Quarterfinals (2017)
El Salvador (3 berths: 1 R16 + 2 PR)	Platense	Preliminary round	Non-champions with best 2021–22 aggregate record	1st	Debut
Guatemala (3 berths: 1 R16 + 2 PR)	Comunicaciones	Round of 16	Champions with better 2021–22 aggregate record (2022 Clausura)	4th (2021)	**Champions (2021)**
Guatemala (3 berths: 1 R16 + 2 PR)	Malacateco	Preliminary round	Champions with worse 2021–22 aggregate record (2021 Apertura)	1st	Debut
Guatemala (3 berths: 1 R16 + 2 PR)	Municipal	Preliminary round	Non-champions with best 2021–22 aggregate record	2nd (2020)	Round of 16 (2021)
Nicaragua (2 berths: 1 R16 + 1 PR)	Diriangén	Round of 16	Champions of both Apertura and Clausura Finals 2021–22 Liga Primera de Nicaragua	5th (2021)	Round of 16 (2018)
Nicaragua (2 berths: 1 R16 + 1 PR)	Real Esteli	Preliminary round	Non-champions with best 2021–22 Liga Primera de Nicaragua record	5th (2021)	Quarterfinals (2020)
Belize (1 PR berth)	Verdes	Preliminary round	Champions with better 2021–22 aggregate record	3rd (2021)	Preliminary Round (2021)

Qualified teams from Caribbean (3 teams: 1 entering in Round of 16, 2 entering in Preliminary Round)
Association	Team	Entry round	Qualifying method	App. (last)	Previous best (last)
Dominican Republic (2 berths: 1 R16 + 1 PR)	Cibao FC	Round of 16	2022 CONCACAF Caribbean Club Championship runners-up (2nd overall)	2nd (2020)	Preliminary Round (2020)
Dominican Republic (2 berths: 1 R16 + 1 PR)	Atlético Vega Real	Preliminary round	2022 CONCACAF Caribbean Club Championship third place (3rd overall)	1st	Debut
Jamaica (1 PR berth)	Waterhouse	Preliminary round	2022 Caribbean CONCACAF League playoff winners	3rd (2020)	Quarterfinal (2019)

== Draw ==
The draw for the 2022 CONCACAF League was held on 8 June 2022, 20:00 EDT (UTC−4), at the CONCACAF headquarters in Miami, United States.

For the preliminary round, the draw determined each tie (numbered 1 through 6) between a team from Pot 1 and a team from Pot 2, each containing six teams. Teams from the same association could not be drawn against each other except for "wildcard" teams which replace a team from another association.

For the round of 16, the draw determined each tie (numbered 1 through 8) between a team from Pot 3 and a team from Pot 4, each containing eight teams. Teams from the same association could not be drawn against each other except for "wildcard" teams which replace a team from another association. The six preliminary round winners, whose identity was not known at the time of the draw, were placed in Pot 4 and could be drawn into the same tie with another team from the same association.

The seeding of teams was based on the CONCACAF Club Index. The CONCACAF Club Index, instead of ranking each team, is based on the on-field performance of the teams that have occupied the respective qualifying slots in the previous five editions of the CONCACAF League and CONCACAF Champions League. To determine the total points awarded to a slot in any single edition of the CONCACAF League or CONCACAF Champions League, CONCACAF uses the following formula:

Points per	Participation	Win	Draw	Stage advanced	Champions
CONCACAF Champions League (2018–2019)	4	3	1	1	2
CONCACAF League (2017–2020)	2	3	1	0.5	1

Teams qualified for the CONCACAF League based on criteria set by their association (e.g., tournament champions, runners-up, cup champions), resulting in an assigned slot (e.g., CRC1, CRC2) for each team.

The 22 teams were distributed in the pots as follows:

Teams in preliminary round draw
Pot	Rank	Slot	2017 CL or 2018 CCL	2018 CL or 2019 CCL	2019 CL	2020 CL	2021 CL	Total	Team
Pot 1	1	CRC3	2	19.5	27	18	18	84.5	(Costa Rica) Alajuelense
Pot 1	2	GUA3	0	0	12	4.5	30	46.5	(Guatemala) Municipal
Pot 1	3	HON3	2	21.5	3	6	12	44.5	(Honduras) Real España
Pot 1	4	SLV3	8.5	6.5	16.5	2	3	36.5	(El Salvador) Platense
Pot 1	5	CAN2	0	0	9.5	10	16.5	36	(Canada) Pacific FC
Pot 1	6	PAN3	11	15	2	3	3.5	34.5	(Panama) Sporting San Miguelito
Pot 2	7	SLV2	11.5	5	7.5	3	3	30	(El Salvador) Águila
Pot 2	8	CCC3	5	5.5	4	10.5	2	27	(Dominican Republic) Atlético Vega Real
Pot 2	9	NCA2	9.5	2	5	3.5	2	22	(Nicaragua) Real Estelí
Pot 2	10	GUA2	0	0	3	3	8.5	14.5	(Guatemala) Malacateco
Pot 2	11	CCC4	2	5	5.5	2	0	14.5	(Jamaica) Waterhouse
Pot 2	12	BLZ1	2	2	2	2	2	10	(Belize) Verdes

Teams in round of 16 draw
Pot	Rank	Slot	2017 CL or 2018 CCL	2018 CL or 2019 CCL	2019 CL	2020 CL	2021 CL	Total	Team
Pot 3	1	HON1	5	4	16.5	10	5	40.5	(Honduras) Olimpia
Pot 3	2	HON2	2	3	13	6.5	15.5	40	(Honduras) Motagua
Pot 3	3	CRC1	5	7	7.5	12.5	4	36	(Costa Rica) Herediano
Pot 3	4	PAN2	13	8.5	6.5	2	2	32	(Panama) Alianza
Pot 3	5	PAN1	8	12	5	2	2	29	(Panama) Tauro
Pot 3	6	NCA1	5	5.5	3	6.5	5	25	(Nicaragua) Diriangén
Pot 3	7	SLV1	7	5	5	3	2	22	(El Salvador) Alianza
Pot 3	8	CRC2	5	3	4	2	4	18	(Costa Rica) Cartaginés
Pot 4	9	CCC2	2	5	5.5	2	2	16.5	(Dominican Republic) Cibao
Pot 4	10	GUA1	0	4	3	2	5	14	(Guatemala) Comunicaciones
Pot 4	11	Winner preliminary round 1							
Pot 4	12	Winner preliminary round 2							
Pot 4	13	Winner preliminary round 3							
Pot 4	14	Winner preliminary round 4							
Pot 4	15	Winner preliminary round 5							
Pot 4	16	Winner preliminary round 6							

== Format ==
In the CONCACAF League, the 22 teams played a single-elimination tournament. Each tie was played on a home-and-away two-legged basis.

- In the preliminary round, round of 16, quarter-finals, and semi-finals, the away goals rule was applied if the aggregate score is tied after the second leg. If still tied, the penalty shoot-out was used to determine the winner.
- In the final, the away goals rule was not applied, and extra time would be played if the aggregate score was tied after the second leg. If the aggregate score was still tied after extra time, the penalty shoot-out would be used to determine the winner.

== Schedule ==
The schedule of the competition was as follows.

Round	First leg	Second leg
Preliminary round	26–28 July	2–4 August
Round of 16	16–18 August	23–25 August
Quarter-finals	7–8 September	13–15 September
Semi-finals	4–5 October	11 October
Final	26 October	2 November

Times are Eastern Daylight Time (i.e., UTC−4), as listed by CONCACAF (local times are in parentheses).

== Bracket ==
Preliminary round
(Panama) Sporting San Miguelito	1	3	4
(Guatemala) Malacateco	1	0	1
(Guatemala) Municipal	4	5	9
(Dominican Republic) Atletico Vega Real	0	0	0
(Canada) Pacific FC	0	6	6
(Jamaica) Waterhouse	0	0	0
(Honduras) Real España	0	3	3
(Nicaragua) Real Estelí	0	1	1
(Costa Rica) Alajuelense	1	3	4
(El Salvador) Águila	1	0	1
(El Salvador) Platense	0	2	2
(Belize) Verdes (a)	0	2	2

Round of 16
(Panama) Tauro	1	1	2
(Panama) Sporting San Miguelito	0	1	1
(Honduras) Motagua	1	2	3
(Dominican Republic) Cibao	0	0	0
(Honduras) Olimpia	2	1	3
(Guatemala) Municipal	2	0	2
(Nicaragua) Diriangén	1	1	2
(Guatemala) Comunicaciones	0	1	1
(Costa Rica) Herediano (p)	1	0	1 (6)
(Canada) Pacific FC	0	1	1 (5)
(Costa Rica) Cartaginés	0	0	0
(Honduras) Real España	2	2	4
(Panama) Alianza	0	1	1
(Costa Rica) Alajuelense	5	1	6
(El Salvador) Alianza	2	5	7
(Belize) Verdes	0	1	1

Quarter-finals
(Panama) Tauro	0	0	0 (4)
(Honduras) Motagua (p)	0	0	0 (5)
(Honduras) Olimpia	4	3	7
(Nicaragua) Diriangén	0	1	1
(Costa Rica) Herediano	1	1	2
(Honduras) Real España	3	1	4
(Costa Rica) Alajuelense	1	2	3
(El Salvador) Alianza	0	0	0

Semi-finals
(Honduras) Motagua	0	0	0
(Honduras) Olimpia	0	1	1
(Honduras) Real España	0	2	2
(Costa Rica) Alajuelense	3	2	5

Final
(Honduras) Olimpia	3	2	5
(Costa Rica) Alajuelense	2	2	4

1. ^{†} Order of legs to be decided, with the team which have the better performance in previous rounds (excluding preliminary round) hosting the second leg.

== Preliminary round ==
In the preliminary round, the matchups were decided by draw: PR-1 through PR-6. The teams from Pot 1 in the draw host the second leg.

=== Summary ===
The first legs were played on 26–28 July, and the second legs were played on 2–4 August 2022.

Team 1	Agg.	Team 2	1st leg	2nd leg
Verdes (Belize)	2–2 (a)	(El Salvador) Platense	0–0	2–2
Águila (El Salvador)	1–4	(Costa Rica) Alajuelense	1–1	0–3
Real Estelí (Nicaragua)	1–3	(Honduras) Real España	0–0	1–3
Malacateco (Guatemala)	1–4	(Panama) Sporting San Miguelito	1–1	0–3
Waterhouse (Jamaica)	0–6	(Canada) Pacific FC	0–0	0–6
Atlético Vega Real (Dominican Republic)	0–9	(Guatemala) Municipal	0–4	0–5

=== Matches ===
27 July 2022
22:00 (20:00 UTC−6)

Verdes (Belize)	0–0	(El Salvador) Platense
	Report

FFB Stadium, Belmopan
Referee: Ken Pennyfeather (Antigua and Barbuda)
3 August 2022
22:00 (20:00 UTC−6)

Platense (El Salvador)	2–2	(Belize) Verdes
Machado 61'; Ortiz 84' (pen.)	Report	Ibarra 19'; Villeda 38'

Estadio Cuscatlán, San Salvador
Referee: Félix Mojica (Nicaragua)

Tied 2–2 on aggregate. Verdes won on away goals.

26 July 2022
22:00 (20:00 UTC−6)

Águila (El Salvador)	1–1	(Costa Rica) Alajuelense
Acuña 51'	Report	Félix 85'

Estadio Juan Francisco Barraza, San Miguel
Referee: Jefferson Escobar (Honduras)
2 August 2022
20:00 (18:00 UTC−6)

Alajuelense (Costa Rica)	3–0	(El Salvador) Águila
Suárez 3'; Alfaro 67'; David 75'	Report

Estadio Ricardo Saprissa Aymá, San José
Referee: Adonai Escobedo (Mexico)

Alajuelense won 4–1 on aggregate

28 July 2022
22:00 (20:00 UTC−6)

Real Estelí (Nicaragua)	0–0	(Honduras) Real España
	Report

Estadio Independencia, Estelí
Referee: José Fuentes (Guatemala)
4 August 2022
20:00 (18:00 UTC−6)

Real España (Honduras)	3–1	(Nicaragua) Real Estelí
Rocca 7' (pen.), 68'; Reyes 88'	Report	Monserrat 23' (pen.)

Estadio General Francisco Morazán, San Pedro Sula
Referee: Mario Escobar (Guatemala)

Real España won 3–1 on aggregate

27 July 2022
20:00 (18:00 UTC−6)

Malacateco (Guatemala)	1–1	(Panama) Sporting San Miguelito
Aguilar 75'	Report	Samms 55' (pen.)

Estadio Pensativo, Antigua Guatemala
Referee: Damien Rosa (France)
3 August 2022
20:00 (19:00 UTC−5)

Sporting San Miguelito (Panama)	3–0	(Guatemala) Malacateco
Machado 14'; Galván 30'; Dwann 70'	Report

Estadio Rommel Fernández, Panama City
Referee: Filiberto Martínez (El Salvador)

Sporting San Miguelito won 4–1 on aggregate

26 July 2022
20:00 (19:00 UTC−5)

Waterhouse (Jamaica)	0–0	(Canada) Pacific FC
	Report

Sabina Park, Kingston
Referee: Josué Ugalde (Costa Rica)
2 August 2022
22:00 (19:00 UTC−7)

Pacific FC (Canada)	6–0	(Jamaica) Waterhouse
Díaz 13', 54', 73'; Bustos 41'; Heard 56', 61'	Report

Starlight Stadium, Langford
Attendance: 4,487
Referee: Nima Saghafi (United States)

Pacific FC won 6–0 on aggregate

28 July 2022
20:00

Atlético Vega Real (Dominican Republic)	0–4	(Guatemala) Municipal
	Report	Martínez 28'; Archila 36'; Sequen 49'; Rotondi 90+2'

Estadio Cibao FC, Santiago de los Caballeros
Referee: Fernando Morón (Panama)
4 August 2022
22:00 (20:00 UTC−6)

Municipal (Guatemala)	5–0	(Dominican Republic) Atlético Vega Real
López 22'; Rotondi 43' (pen.); Barrientos 44'; Portillo 68' (pen.); Méndez 78'	Report

Estadio Doroteo Guamuch Flores, Guatemala City
Referee: Iván Barton (El Salvador)

Municipal won 9–0 on aggregate

== Round of 16 ==
In the round of 16, the matchups were decided by draw: R16-1 through R16-6. The teams from Pot 3 in the draw host the second leg.

=== Summary ===
The first legs were played on 16–18 August, and the second legs were played on 23–25 August 2022.

Team 1	Agg.	Team 2	1st leg	2nd leg
Sporting San Miguelito (Panama)	1–2	(Panama) Tauro	0–1	1–1
Cibao (Dominican Republic)	0–3	(Honduras) Motagua	0–1	0–2
Municipal (Guatemala)	2–3	(Honduras) Olimpia	2–2	0–1
Comunicaciones (Guatemala)	1–2	(Nicaragua) Diriangén	0–1	1–1
Pacific FC (Canada)	1–1 (5–6 p)	(Costa Rica) Herediano	0–1	1–0
Real España (Honduras)	4–0	(Costa Rica) Cartaginés	2–0	2–0
Alajuelense (Costa Rica)	6–1	(Panama) Alianza	5–0	1–1
Verdes (Belize)	1–7	(El Salvador) Alianza	0–2	1–5

=== Matches ===
16 August 2022
18:00 (17:00 UTC−5)

Sporting San Miguelito (Panama)	0–1	(Panama) Tauro
	Report	Sinclair 82'

Estadio Universitario F.C., Penonomé
Referee: David Gómez (Costa Rica)
23 August 2022
18:00 (17:00 UTC−5)

Tauro (Panama)	1–1	(Panama) Sporting San Miguelito
Gudiño 78'	Report	Negrete 32' (o.g.)

Estadio Universitario F.C., Penonomé
Referee: Steffon Dewar (Jamaica)

Tauro won 2–1 on aggregate

17 August 2022
20:00

Cibao (Dominican Republic)	0–1	(Honduras) Motagua
	Report	Mejía 79'

Estadio Cibao FC, Santiago de los Caballeros
Referee: Joe Dickerson (United States)
24 August 2022
20:00 (18:00 UTC−6)

Motagua (Honduras)	2–0	(Dominican Republic) Cibao
Tejeda 51'; Hernández 90+1'	Report

Estadio Nacional Chelato Ucles, Tegucigalpa
Referee: Benjamín Pineda (Costa Rica)

Motagua won 3–0 on aggregate

18 August 2022
22:00 (20:00 UTC−6)

Municipal (Guatemala)	2–2	(Honduras) Olimpia
Rotondi 55' (pen.); Matos 69'	Report	Moya 3'; García 9'

Estadio Doroteo Guamuch Flores, Guatemala City
Referee: Marco Ortíz (Mexico)
25 August 2022
22:30 (20:30 UTC−6)

Olimpia (Honduras)	1–0	(Guatemala) Municipal
Chirinos 65'	Report

Estadio Nacional Chelato Ucles, Tegucigalpa
Referee: Rubiel Vazquez (United States)

Olimpia won 3–2 on aggregate

16 August 2022
20:00 (18:00 UTC−6)

Comunicaciones (Guatemala)	0–1	(Nicaragua) Diriangén
	Report	Peters 34'

Estadio Doroteo Guamuch Flores, Guatemala City
Referee: Moeth Gaymes (Saint Vincent and the Grenadines)
23 August 2022
22:30 (20:30 UTC−6)

Diriangén (Nicaragua)	1–1	(Guatemala) Comunicaciones
Robinson 7'	Report	Santis 51'

Estadio Cacique Diriangén, Diriamba
Referee: Lendy Taveras (Bahamas)

Diriangén won 2–1 on aggregate

16 August 2022
22:00 (19:00 UTC−7)

Pacific FC (Canada)	0–1	(Costa Rica) Herediano
	Report	Brenes 83'

Starlight Stadium, Langford
Referee: José Torres (Puerto Rico)
23 August 2022
20:15 (18:15 UTC−6)

Herediano (Costa Rica)	0–1	(Canada) Pacific FC
	Report	dos Santos 89'
Penalties
Basulto (penalty missed); Rocha (penalty scored); Brenes (penalty scored); López (penalty scored); Campos (penalty scored); Galo (penalty scored); Soto (penalty scored)	6–5	(penalty scored) Meilleur-Giguère; (penalty scored) Heard; (penalty scored) Bustos; (penalty missed) Daniels; (penalty scored) Aparicio; (penalty scored) dos Santos; (penalty missed) Đidić

Estadio Ricardo Saprissa Aymá, San José
Referee: Bryan López (Guatemala)

Tied 1–1 on aggregate. Herediano won 6–5 on penalties.

18 August 2022
18:00 (16:00 UTC−6)

Real España (Honduras)	2–0	(Costa Rica) Cartaginés
Rocca 13'; Reyes 72'	Report

Estadio General Francisco Morazán, San Pedro Sula
Referee: Oliver Vargara (Panama)
25 August 2022
18:00 (16:00 UTC−6)

Cartaginés (Costa Rica)	0–2	(Honduras) Real España
	Report	Benavídez 32'; Vargas 45+2' (o.g.)

Estadio José Rafael Meza, Cartago
Referee: Iván Barton (El Salvador)

Real España won 4–0 on aggregate

18 August 2022
20:00 (18:00 UTC−6)

Alajuelense (Costa Rica)	5–0	(Panama) Alianza
Rodríguez 8', 31', 36'; López 41'; Cubero 84'	Report

Estadio Ricardo Saprissa Aymá, San José
Referee: Julio Luna (Guatemala)
25 August 2022
20:15 (19:15 UTC−5)

Alianza (Panama)	1–1	(Costa Rica) Alajuelense
Álvarado 68'	Report	Cano 37' (o.g.)

Estadio Universitario F.C., Penonomé
Referee: Lyes Arfa (Canada)

Alajuelense won 6–1 on aggregate

17 August 2022
22:00 (20:00 UTC−6)

Verdes (Belize)	0–2	(El Salvador) Alianza
	Report	Landazuri 57'; Zelaya 67'

FFB Stadium, Belmopan
Referee: Selvin Brown (Honduras)
24 August 2022
22:15 (20:15 UTC−5)

Alianza (El Salvador)	5–1	(Belize) Verdes
Landazuri 10'; Zelaya 20' (pen.); Monterroza 50'; Rivas 64'; Mauricio 84'	Report	Lopez 54'

Estadio Cuscatlán, San Salvador
Referee: Saíd Martínez (Honduras)

Alianza won 7–1 on aggregate

== Quarter-finals ==
In the quarter-finals, the matchups were determined as follows:

- QF1: Winner R16-1 vs. Winner R16-2
- QF2: Winner R16-3 vs. Winner R16-4
- QF3: Winner R16-5 vs. Winner R16-6
- QF4: Winner R16-7 vs. Winner R16-8

The winners of round of 16 matchups 1, 3, 5, 7 host the second leg.

=== Summary ===
The first legs were played on 7–8 September, and the second legs were played on 13–15 September 2022.

Team 1	Agg.	Team 2	1st leg	2nd leg
Motagua (Honduras)	0–0 (5–4 p)	(Panama) Tauro	0–0	0–0
Diriangén (Nicaragua)	1–7	(Honduras) Olimpia	0–4	1–3
Real España (Honduras)	4–2	(Costa Rica) Herediano	3–1	1–1
Alianza (El Salvador)	0–3	(Costa Rica) Alajuelense	0–1	0–2

=== Matches ===
8 September 2022
18:00 (16:00 UTC−6)

Motagua (Honduras)	0–0	(Panama) Tauro
	Report

Estadio Nacional Chelato Uclés, Tegucigalpa
Referee: Juan Gabriel Calderón (Costa Rica)
14 September 2022
22:00 (21:00 UTC−5)

Tauro (Panama)	0–0	(Honduras) Motagua
	Report
Penalties
Aguilar (penalty scored); Gutiérrez (penalty scored); Botello (penalty scored); Camargo (penalty scored); Rodríguez (penalty missed)	4–5	(penalty scored) Moreira; (penalty scored) Tejeda; (penalty scored) Decas; (penalty scored) Santos; (penalty scored) Moncada

Estadio Universitario F.C., Penonomé
Referee: José Torres (Puerto Rico)

Tied 0–0 on aggregate. Motagua won 5–4 on penalties.

8 September 2022
22:00 (20:00 UTC−6)

Diriangén (Nicaragua)	0–4	(Honduras) Olimpia
	Report	Moya 5'; Bengtson 19'; Rodríguez 41'; Benguché 90+1'

Estadio Cacique Diriangén, Diriamba
Referee: Keylor Herrera (Costa Rica)
15 September 2022
22:15 (20:15 UTC−6)

Olimpia (Honduras)	3–1	(Nicaragua) Diriangén
Bengtson 62'; Benguché 81'; Chirinos 90+4' (pen.)	Report	Torres 32'

Estadio Olímpico Metropolitano, San Pedro Sula
Referee: Daneon Parchment (Jamaica)

Olimpia won 7–1 on aggregate

8 September 2022
20:00 (18:00 UTC−6)

Real España (Honduras)	3–1	(Costa Rica) Herediano
Y. Mejía 63'; C. Mejía 69'; Rocca 80'	Report	Fuller 74'

Estadio General Francisco Morazán, San Pedro Sula
Referee: Fernando Guerrero (Mexico)
15 September 2022
20:00 (18:00 UTC−6)

Herediano (Costa Rica)	1–1	(Honduras) Real España
Contreras 82'	Report	Montes 3'

Estadio Nacional, San José
Referee: Armando Villarreal (United States)

Real España won 4–2 on aggregate

7 September 2022
22:00 (20:00 UTC−6)

Alianza (El Salvador)	0–1	(Costa Rica) Alajuelense
	Report	Alfaro 38'

Estadio Cuscatlán, San Salvador
Referee: Tori Penso (United States)
13 September 2022
22:00 (20:00 UTC−6)

Alajuelense (Costa Rica)	2–0	(El Salvador) Alianza
Venegas 7' (pen.); Suárez 87'	Report

Estadio Alejandro Morera Soto, Alajuela
Referee: Walter López (Honduras)

Alajuelense won 3–0 on aggregate

== Semi-finals ==
In the semi-finals, the matchups were determined as follows:

- SF1: Winner QF1 vs. Winner QF2
- SF2: Winner QF3 vs. Winner QF4

The semi-finalists in each tie which had the better performance in previous rounds (excluding preliminary round) hosted the second leg.

Pos	Team	Pld	W	D	L	GF	GA	GD	Pts	Host
2 (SF1)	(Honduras) Olimpia	4	3	1	0	10	3	+7	10	Second leg
1 (SF1)	(Honduras) Motagua	4	2	2	0	3	0	+3	8	First leg
2 (SF2)	(Costa Rica) Alajuelense	4	3	1	0	9	1	+8	10	Second leg
1 (SF2)	(Honduras) Real España	4	3	1	0	8	2	+6	10	First leg

Updated to match(es) played on 15 September 2022. Source: CONCACAF
Rules for classification: 1) Points; 2) Goal difference; 3) Goals scored; 4) Away goals scored; 5) Wins; 6) Away wins; 7) Disciplinary points (1 point for yellow card, 3 points for indirect red card, 4 points for direct red card, 5 points for yellow card and direct red card); 8) Drawing of lots

=== Summary ===
The first legs were played on 4–5 October, and the second legs were played on 11 October 2022.

Team 1	Agg.	Team 2	1st leg	2nd leg
Motagua (Honduras)	0–1	(Honduras) Olimpia	0–0	0–1
Real España (Honduras)	2–5	(Costa Rica) Alajuelense	0–3	2–2

=== Matches ===
5 October 2022
21:00 (19:00 UTC−6)

Motagua (Honduras)	0–0	(Honduras) Olimpia
	Report

Estadio Nacional Chelato Uclés, Tegucigalpa
Referee: Mario Escobar (Guatemala)
11 October 2022
22:15 (20:15 UTC−6)

Olimpia (Honduras)	1–0	(Honduras) Motagua
Sánchez 87'	Report

Estadio Nacional Chelato Uclés, Tegucigalpa
Referee: Iván Barton (El Salvador)

Olimpia won 1–0 on aggregate

4 October 2022
21:00 (19:00 UTC−6)

Real España (Honduras)	0–3	(Costa Rica) Alajuelense
	Report	Góndola 12'; Venegas 59'; Borges 61'

Estadio General Francisco Morazán, San Pedro Sula
Referee: César Ramos (Mexico)
11 October 2022
20:00 (18:00 UTC−6)

Alajuelense (Costa Rica)	2–2	(Honduras) Real España
López 43'; González 90+1'	Report	Rocca 19', 78'

Estadio Alejandro Morera Soto, Alajuela
Referee: Ismail Elfath (United States)

Alajuelense won 5–2 on aggregate

== Final ==
In the final (Winner SF1 vs. Winner SF2), the finalists which had the better performance in previous rounds (excluding preliminary round) hosted the second leg.

Pos	Team	Pld	W	D	L	GF	GA	GD	Pts	Host
1	(Costa Rica) Alajuelense	6	4	2	0	14	3	+11	14	Second leg
2	(Honduras) Olimpia	6	4	2	0	11	3	+8	14	First leg

Source: CONCACAF
Rules for classification: 1) Points; 2) Goal difference; 3) Goals scored; 4) Away goals scored; 5) Wins; 6) Away wins; 7) Disciplinary points (1 point for yellow card, 3 points for indirect red card, 4 points for direct red card, 5 points for yellow card and direct red card); 8) Drawing of lots

=== Summary ===
Team 1	Agg.	Team 2	1st leg	2nd leg
Olimpia (Honduras)	5–4	(Costa Rica) Alajuelense	3–2	2–2

=== Matches ===
26 October 2022
21:00 (19:00 UTC−6)

Olimpia (Honduras)	3–2	(Costa Rica) Alajuelense
Pinto 12'; Álvarez 47'; Chirinos 68'	Report	Venegas 45+4'; González 84'

Estadio Nacional Chelato Uclés, Tegucigalpa
Attendance: 19,320
Referee: Drew Fischer (Canada)
2 November 2022
21:00 (19:00 UTC−6)

Alajuelense (Costa Rica)	2–2	(Honduras) Olimpia
Suárez 35'; Gamboa 40'	Report	Pinto 28'; Araújo 87'

Estadio Alejandro Morera Soto, Alajuela
Attendance: 13,486
Referee: Adonai Escobedo (Mexico)

Olimpia won 5–4 on aggregate.

== Top goalscorers ==
Team eliminated for this round.

Rank	Player	Team	Goals	By round									
Rank	Player	Team	Goals	PR1	PR2	2R1	2R2	QF1	QF2	SF1	SF2	F1	F2
1	(Argentina) Ramiro Rocca	(Honduras) Real España	6		2	1		1			2		
2	(Mexico) Alejandro Díaz	(Canada) Pacific FC	3		3								
2	(Honduras) Michaell Chirinos	(Honduras) Olimpia	3				1		1			1	
2	(Costa Rica) Doryan Rodríguez	(Costa Rica) Alajuelense	3			3							
2	(Argentina) Matías Rotondi	(Guatemala) Municipal	3	1	1	1							
2	(Costa Rica) Aarón Suárez	(Costa Rica) Alajuelense	3	1					1				1
2	(Costa Rica) Johan Venegas	(Costa Rica) Alajuelense	3						1	1		1	
8	11 players		2										

== Qualification to CONCACAF Champions League ==
Starting from the round of 16, teams are ranked based on their results (excluding preliminary round). Based on the ranking, the top six teams, i.e., champions, runners-up, both losing semi-finalists, and best two losing quarter-finalists, qualify for the 2023 CONCACAF Champions League.

Pos	Team	Pld	W	D	L	GF	GA	GD	Pts	Qualification
1	(Honduras) Olimpia	8	5	3	0	16	7	+9	18	Champions; 2023 CONCACAF Champions League
2	(Costa Rica) Alajuelense	8	4	3	1	18	8	+10	15	Runners-up; 2023 CONCACAF Champions League
3	(Honduras) Real España	6	3	2	1	10	7	+3	11	Semi-finalists; 2023 CONCACAF Champions League
4	(Honduras) Motagua	6	2	3	1	3	1	+2	9	Semi-finalists; 2023 CONCACAF Champions League
5	(El Salvador) Alianza	4	2	0	2	7	4	+3	6	Quarter-finalists; 2023 CONCACAF Champions League
6	(Panama) Tauro	4	1	3	0	2	1	+1	6	Quarter-finalists; 2023 CONCACAF Champions League
7	(Costa Rica) Herediano	4	1	1	2	3	5	−2	4	Quarter-finalists
8	(Nicaragua) Diriangén	4	1	1	2	3	8	−5	4	Quarter-finalists
9	(Canada) Pacific FC	2	1	0	1	1	1	0	3	Round of 16
10	(Guatemala) Municipal	2	0	1	1	2	3	−1	1	Round of 16
11	(Guatemala) Comunicaciones	2	0	1	1	1	2	−1	1	Round of 16
12	(Panama) Sporting San Miguelito	2	0	1	1	1	2	−1	1	Round of 16
13	(Panama) Alianza	2	0	1	1	1	6	−5	1	Round of 16
14	(Dominican Republic) Cibao FC	2	0	0	2	0	3	−3	0	Round of 16
15	(Costa Rica) Cartaginés	2	0	0	2	0	4	−4	0	Round of 16
16	(Belize) Verdes	2	0	0	2	1	7	−6	0	Round of 16

Source: CONCACAF
Rules for classification: 1) Points; 2) Goal difference; 3) Goals scored; 4) Away goals scored; 5) Wins; 6) Away wins; 7) Disciplinary points (1 point for yellow card, 3 points for indirect red card, 4 points for direct red card, 5 points for yellow card and direct red card); 8) Drawing of lots (Regulations Article 12.10.4).

== Awards ==
The following awards were given at the conclusion of the tournament:

Award	Player	Team
Golden Ball	(Honduras) Michaell Chirinos	(Honduras) Olimpia
Golden Boot	(Argentina) Ramiro Rocca	(Honduras) Real España
Golden Glove	(Costa Rica) Leonel Moreira	(Costa Rica) Alajuelense
Best Young Player	(Costa Rica) Aarón Suárez	(Costa Rica) Alajuelense
Fair Play Award	—	(Costa Rica) Alajuelense

Team of the Tournament
Position	Player	Team
GK	(Costa Rica) Leonel Moreira	(Costa Rica) Alajuelense
DF	(Honduras) Carlos Sánchez	(Honduras) Olimpia
DF	(Costa Rica) Giancarlo González	(Costa Rica) Alajuelense
DF	(Honduras) José García	(Honduras) Olimpia
DF	(Honduras) Maylor Núñez	(Honduras) Olimpia
MF	(Costa Rica) Celso Borges	(Costa Rica) Alajuelense
MF	(Honduras) José Pinto	(Honduras) Olimpia
MF	(Costa Rica) Aarón Suárez	(Costa Rica) Alajuelense
MF	(Honduras) Michaell Chirinos	(Honduras) Olimpia
FW	(Argentina) Ramiro Rocca	(Honduras) Real España
FW	(Costa Rica) Johan Venegas	(Costa Rica) Alajuelense

== See also ==
- 2023 CONCACAF Champions League
