= Guerry Romondt =

Haitian footballer (born 1985)

Personal information
- Full name: Guerry Romondt
- Date of birth: August 10, 1985 (age 41)
- Place of birth: Port-de-Paix, Haiti
- Height: 1.76 m (5 ft 9 in)
- Position: Goalkeeper

Team information
- Current team: FICA

Senior career*
Years	Team	Apps	(Gls)
2003–2005	Racing		
2005–2006	Saint-Louis du Nord		
2006–2007	Zénith		
2008–2011	Saint-Louis du Nord		
2011–2014	Tempête		
2015–2018	FICA		
2018–	Arcahaie		

International career
2013–	Haiti	3	(0)
- * Club domestic league appearances and goals

Guerry Romondt (born 10 August 1985) is a Haitian footballer who currently plays for Arcahaie.

== Youth career ==
Romondt left his hometown of Port-de-paix in 1999 to go to Port-au-Prince to train with a small club named Sophisa FC.

== Club career ==
Romondt started his career with Racing Club Haïtien in 2003. In 2005, he left to play in the second division of Haitian football for the AS Saint-Louis du Nord (ASSL). A year removed and he left to play for Zénith. After a year at Zénith, Romondt went back to ASSL. In 2011, he signed to play with Tempête where he won the Ligue Haïtienne that year. In 2015, Romondt left Tempête for FICA and has won two back-to-back championships between 2015 and 2016.

== International career ==
Romondt made his international debut for the Haiti national football team against Bolivia on 6 February 2013.
