= Ramiro Rocca =

Argentine footballer

Personal information
- Full name: Ramiro Iván Rocca
- Date of birth: 22 November 1988 (age 37)
- Place of birth: Hughes, Argentina
- Height: 1.86 m (6 ft 1 in)
- Position: Forward

Team information
- Current team: Municipal
- Number: 19

Youth career
- Newell's

Senior career*
Years	Team	Apps	(Gls)
2013–2014	Sportivo Rivadiavia	9	(1)
2016–2017	Central Córdoba (Rosario)	35	(12)
2017	PSM	18	(11)
2018	Chalatenango	23	(11)
2019	Iztapa	40	(21)
2020–2021	Municipal	33	(27)
2021–2023	Real España	16	(8)
2024-	Municipal	0	(0)
- * Club domestic league appearances and goals

Ramiro Iván Rocca (born 22 November 1988) is an Argentine professional footballer who plays as a forward for Liga Nacional club Municipal.

== Career ==
At the age of 16, Rocca joined the youth academy of Argentine top flight side Newell's, where he said, "at first it was difficult for me to adapt, like every kid from a small town, later when I found a taste for the city, I started with problems of the 18-year-old kid who is in the foolishness and that's why they let me free".

In 2013, he signed for Sportivo Rivadiavia in the Argentine fourth division.

In 2018, Rocca signed for Salvadoran club Chalatenango.

Before the second half of 2018–19, he signed for Iztapa in Guatemala.

On 29 November 2020, he scored four goals for Municipal during a 6–0 win over Iztapa.

Rocca was the top Argentine scorer in top flights worldwide during 2020.

In 2021, he signed for Honduran team Real España, where he said "it is a pity that in a country where it is very rich in players they have bad playing fields".

== Honours ==
Municipal

- Liga Nacional de Guatemala: Clausura 2024

Individual

- CONCACAF League Golden Boot: 2022
