= Arcahaie FC =

Haitian football club

- Full name: Arcahaie Football Club
- Founded: 2017
- Ground: Parc Saint-Yves
- Capacity: 1,000
- Chairman: Lussier Pierre Richard
- Manager: Gabriel Michel
- League: Ligue Haïtienne
- 2020–21: 2nd Ouverture
Home colours	Away colours

Arcahaie Football Club is a Haitian association football club based in Arcahaie, Ouest. The club currently competes in the Ligue Haïtienne.

== Current squad ==
As of 20 June 2019

Note: Flags indicate national team as defined under FIFA eligibility rules; some limited exceptions apply. Players may hold more than one non-FIFA nationality.

No.	Pos.	Nation	Player
1	GK	HAI	Guerry Romondt
2	FW	HAI	William Barthélémy
3	DF	HAI	Reginald Cadet
4	MF	HAI	Olnick Alesy
5	DF	HAI	Esdras Philippe
6	MF	HAI	Junior Limage
7	FW	HAI	Maillelove Dorvilien
8	MF	HAI	Clifford Thomas
9	FW	HAI	Pierre Yvener Honoré
10	MF	HAI	Wendy Louis-Jean
11	FW	HAI	Richardson Thomas
12	DF	HAI	Frantz Piton
13	DF	HAI	Mark Alain Sully

No.	Pos.	Nation	Player
14	MF	HAI	Wilmane Exumé
15	FW	HAI	Stanley Province
17	DF	HAI	Billy Anacius Hantz
18	DF	HAI	Luxon Gessé
19	DF	HAI	Luxon Gesse
21	GK	HAI	Wiljode Louis
22	MF	HAI	Euguenor Cinéus
23	FW	HAI	Georgy Stone
24	FW	HAI	Abellard Duplant
31	GK	HAI	Jeanweedens Desrosiers
34	DF	HAI	Sylvenson Colin
35	DF	HAI	Alland Stone
36	FW	HAI	Woncky Joseph

Coach:Gabriel Michel Assistant:Pierre. Richard Elasmé

== Honours ==
- Ligue Haïtienne: 1

2019–20

== International Competitions ==
- CONCACAF Champions League : 1 appearance

2021 - Round of 16 vs (Mexico) Cruz Azul (H 0-0, A 0-8) Agg L 0-8

- CONCACAF League: 1 appearance

2020 - Semifinals vs (Costa Rica) Saprissa L 0-5
