= 2010–11 National Premier League =

National Premier League
- Season: 2010–11
- Champions: Tivoli Gardens; 5th title
- Relegated: St. George's; Benfica
- Matches: 228
- Goals: 460 (2.02 per match)
- Biggest home win: Arnett Gardens 12-0 Benfica
- Biggest away win: Benfica 0-7 Humble Lions
- Highest scoring: Arnett Gardens 12-0 Benfica

The 2010–11 National Premier League (also known as the 2010–11 Digicel Premier League) is the highest competitive football league in Jamaica. The regular season began August 29, 2010 and will be completed May 1, 2011. The teams will play each other 3 times each then the final 5 games will be played amongst the top 6 and bottom 6; making it a total of 38 games each. Harbour View were the defending champions, having won their third Jamaican championship last season.

Tropical storm Nicole caused a number of games to be postponed.

== Teams ==
Rivoli United and August Town finished 11th and 12th at the end of last season and were relegated to lower leagues.

Taking their places in the league this season are Benfica and Reno, which were the best two clubs in last season's second level promotion playoffs.

Location of teams in the 2010–11 National Premier League

| Team | Location | Stadium | Stadium Capacity | Manager |
|---|---|---|---|---|
| Arnett Gardens | Kingston | Anthony Spaulding Sports Complex | 1,500 | (Jamaica) Paul "Tegat" Davis |
| Benfica | Lime Hall, St. Ann | Drax Hall Football Field | 2,000 | (Jamaica) Harold Thomas |
| Boys' Town | Kingston | Collie Smith Drive Sporting Complex | 2,000 | (Jamaica) Andrew Price |
| Harbour View | Kingston | Harbour View Mini Stadium | 7,000 | (Jamaica) Donovan Hayles |
| Humble Lions | Clarendon | Effortville Community Centre | 1,000 | (Jamaica) Lenworth Hyde sr. |
| Portmore United | Portmore | Ferdi Neita Sports Complex | 2,000 | (Jamaica) Linval Dixon |
| Reno | Savanna-la-Mar | Frome Sports Club | 2,000 | (Jamaica) Wendell Downswell |
| Sporting Central Academy | Clarendon | Brancourt Sports Ground, Clarendon Oval | 2,000 | (Jamaica) Donovan Duckie |
| St. George's | Buff Bay | Lynch Park | 2,000 | (Jamaica) Geoffrey Maxwell |
| Tivoli Gardens | Kingston | Railway Oval | 3,000 | (Jamaica) Glendon "Admiral" Bailey |
| Village United | Falmouth | Elleston Wakeland Stadium | 3,000 | (Jamaica) Norman Foster |
| Waterhouse | Kingston | Waterhouse Stadium | 5,000 | (Jamaica) Baris Johnson |

== Regular stage ==
=== League table ===
| Pos | Team | Pld | W | D | L | GF | GA | GD | Pts | Qualification |
|---|---|---|---|---|---|---|---|---|---|---|
| 1 | Tivoli Gardens | 33 | 17 | 10 | 6 | 47 | 26 | +21 | 61 | Championship Playoff |
| 2 | Boys' Town | 33 | 15 | 11 | 7 | 31 | 24 | +7 | 56 | Championship Playoff |
| 3 | Harbour View | 33 | 14 | 9 | 10 | 36 | 26 | +10 | 51 | Championship Playoff |
| 4 | Waterhouse | 33 | 13 | 8 | 12 | 37 | 31 | +6 | 47 | Championship Playoff |
| 5 | Portmore United | 33 | 12 | 11 | 10 | 29 | 25 | +4 | 47 | Championship Playoff |
| 6 | Village United | 33 | 11 | 10 | 12 | 36 | 39 | −3 | 43 | Championship Playoff |
| 7 | Reno | 33 | 10 | 11 | 12 | 34 | 33 | +1 | 41 | Relegation Playoff |
| 8 | Arnett Gardens | 33 | 9 | 14 | 10 | 25 | 29 | −4 | 41 | Relegation Playoff |
| 9 | Sporting Central Academy | 33 | 9 | 13 | 11 | 32 | 31 | +1 | 40 | Relegation Playoff |
| 10 | Benfica | 33 | 10 | 7 | 16 | 33 | 54 | −21 | 37 | Relegation Playoff |
| 11 | St. George's | 33 | 10 | 6 | 17 | 23 | 38 | −15 | 36 | Relegation Playoff |
| 12 | Humble Lions | 33 | 8 | 10 | 15 | 23 | 30 | −7 | 34 | Relegation Playoff |

Source: Jamaican FA
Rules for classification: 1) points; 2) goal difference; 3) number of goals scored.

=== Results ===
==== Matches 1–22 ====
| Home \ Away | ARN | BEN | BOY | HAR | HUM | POR | REN | SCA | STG | TIV | VIL | WAT |
|---|---|---|---|---|---|---|---|---|---|---|---|---|
| Arnett Gardens | | 1–0 | 1–0 | 0–0 | 1–1 | 2–1 | 0–3 | 0–2 | 0–0 | 0–1 | 1–0 | 3–1 |
| Benfica | 1–1 | | 2–1 | 0–4 | 0–1 | 2–1 | 3–2 | 1–2 | 2–1 | 1–3 | 2–2 | 0–0 |
| Boys' Town | 0–2 | 1–1 | | 2–1 | 2–1 | 1–1 | 0–0 | 1–0 | 4–2 | 1–0 | 0–1 | 1–0 |
| Harbour View | 0–1 | 0–1 | 5–1 | | 1–0 | 1–0 | 1–0 | 0–0 | 2–0 | 3–2 | 0–1 | 1–1 |
| Humble Lions | 1–0 | 1–0 | 0–1 | 1–1 | | 0–1 | 1–1 | 1–1 | 2–0 | 1–1 | 3–0 | 1–2 |
| Portmore United | 0–0 | 3–0 | 0–0 | 0–0 | 2–1 | | 2–1 | 1–0 | 1–0 | 2–0 | 3–0 | 0–1 |
| Reno | 0–0 | 4–1 | 0–0 | 1–2 | 2–0 | 0–1 | | 1–1 | 2–1 | 1–0 | 1–1 | 1–1 |
| Sporting Central Academy | 3–0 | 1–0 | 1–1 | 0–1 | 1–1 | 0–1 | 0–1 | | 4–1 | 1–2 | 4–3 | 0–2 |
| St. George's | 1–0 | 0–1 | 1–0 | 1–2 | 1–0 | 1–1 | 2–0 | 0–1 | | 0–1 | 0–1 | 1–0 |
| Tivoli Gardens | 1–1 | 5–0 | 0–2 | 1–0 | 1–0 | 1–1 | 2–1 | 1–0 | 3–0 | | 4–0 | 1–1 |
| Village United | 2–2 | 1–2 | 1–2 | 2–0 | 0–1 | 1–1 | 0–1 | 0–3 | 0–1 | 1–1 | | 2–0 |
| Waterhouse | 2–0 | 4–1 | 0–1 | 1–0 | 1–0 | 1–1 | 1–0 | 0–1 | 3–1 | 1–0 | 2–2 | |

Source: Soccerway
Legend: Blue = home team win; Yellow = draw; Red = away team win.

==== Matches 23–33 ====
| Home \ Away | ARN | BEN | BOY | HAR | HUM | POR | REN | SCA | STG | TIV | VIL | WAT |
|---|---|---|---|---|---|---|---|---|---|---|---|---|
| Arnett Gardens | | | 1–1 | | 0–0 | | 1–1 | 2–0 | 0–1 | 2–2 | | |
| Benfica | 2–1 | | 1–1 | | | 0–1 | 0–1 | | | 2–3 | 0–0 | |
| Boys' Town | | | | | | 1–0 | 0–0 | 0–0 | 2–0 | 0–1 | | 2–1 |
| Harbour View | 1–0 | 3–1 | 0–0 | | 2–0 | | | | | | | 1–0 |
| Humble Lions | | 0–2 | 0–1 | | | | | 0–0 | | 0–3 (Note: This match originally ended 1-0, but was awarded 0-3 afterward.) | | 2–0 |
| Portmore United | 0–1 | | | 0–0 | 0–3 (Note: This match originally ended 0-0, but was awarded 0-3 afterward.) | | | | | | 0–2 | 0–1 |
| Reno | | | | 2–1 | 2–0 | 1–2 | | | 1–2 | | 0–3 | |
| Sporting Central Academy | | 0–3 (Note: This match originally ended 1-1, but was awarded 0-3 afterward.) | | 2–2 | | 1–1 | 1–1 | | 1–1 | | | 0–0 |
| St. George's | | 1–1 | | 0–0 | 0–0 | 1–0 | | | | | 0–1 | |
| Tivoli Gardens | | | | 0–0 | | 1–1 | 1–1 | 1–0 | 2–1 | | 0–0 | |
| Village United | 0–0 | | 0–1 | 3–0 (Note: This match originally ended 0-2, but was awarded 3-0 afterward.) | 2–1 | | | 1–1 | | | | 3–2 |
| Waterhouse | 1–1 | 4–0 | | | | | 2–1 | | 0–1 | 1–2 | | |

Source: Soccerway
Legend: Blue = home team win; Yellow = draw; Red = away team win.

== Championship playoff ==
=== Standings ===
| Pos | Team | Pld | W | D | L | GF | GA | GD | Pts | TIV | BOY | HAR | WAT | POR | VIL |
|---|---|---|---|---|---|---|---|---|---|---|---|---|---|---|---|
| 1 | Tivoli Gardens (C) | 38 | 20 | 12 | 6 | 52 | 27 | +25 | 72 | | 1–0 | | 1–0 | | |
| 2 | Boys' Town | 38 | 19 | 11 | 8 | 39 | 28 | +11 | 68 | | | 2–1 | | | 2–1 |
| 3 | Harbour View | 38 | 17 | 10 | 11 | 43 | 28 | +15 | 61 | 0–0 | | | | 1–0 | 4–0 |
| 4 | Waterhouse | 38 | 14 | 9 | 15 | 38 | 35 | +3 | 51 | | 0–2 | 0–1 | | 1–0 | 0–0 |
| 5 | Portmore United | 38 | 12 | 12 | 14 | 31 | 34 | −3 | 48 | 0–0 | 1–2 | | | | |
| 6 | Village United | 38 | 12 | 11 | 15 | 43 | 49 | −6 | 47 | 1–3 | | | | 5–1 | |

Legend: Blue = home team win; Yellow = draw; Red = away team win.
Rules for classification: 1) points; 2) goal difference; 3) number of goals scored.
(C) Champions

== Relegation playoff ==
=== Standings ===
| Pos | Team | Pld | W | D | L | GF | GA | GD | Pts | Relegation | REN | SCA | ARN | HUM | STG | BEN |
|---|---|---|---|---|---|---|---|---|---|---|---|---|---|---|---|---|
| 7 | Reno | 38 | 13 | 11 | 14 | 39 | 37 | +2 | 50 | | | 3–1 | 1–0 | | | 1–0 |
| 8 | Sporting Central Academy | 38 | 11 | 14 | 13 | 39 | 36 | +3 | 47 | | | | 4–0 | 1–2 | | |
| 9 | Arnett Gardens | 38 | 11 | 14 | 13 | 38 | 36 | +2 | 47 | | | | | | | 12–0 |
| 10 | Humble Lions | 38 | 12 | 10 | 16 | 35 | 32 | +3 | 46 | | 1–0 | | 0–1 | | 2–0 | |
| 11 | St. George's (R) | 38 | 13 | 7 | 18 | 29 | 41 | −12 | 46 | Relegation to 2011-12 Eastern Confederation Super League | 2–0 | 0–0 | 2–0 | | | |
| 12 | Benfica (R) | 38 | 10 | 7 | 21 | 34 | 77 | −43 | 37 | Relegation to 2011-12 Eastern Confederation Super League | | 0–1 | | 0–7 | 1–2 | |

Legend: Blue = home team win; Yellow = draw; Red = away team win.
Rules for classification: 1) points; 2) goal difference; 3) number of goals scored.
(R) Relegated

== Top goalscorers ==
| Rank | Scorer | Team | Goals |
|---|---|---|---|
| 1 | (Jamaica) Kirk Ramsey | Arnett Gardens | 17 |
| 2 | (Jamaica) Craig Foster | Reno | 15 |
| 3 | (Jamaica) Navion Boyd | Tivoli Gardens | 11 |
| 3 | (Jamaica) Steven Morrissey | Portmore United | 11 |
| 5 | (Jamaica) Vincent Earle | Waterhouse | 10 |
| 6 | (Jamaica) Francois Swaby | Sporting Central | 9 |
| 7 | (Jamaica) Devon Hodges | Tivoli Gardens | 8 |
| 7 | (Jamaica) Jermaine Anderson | Waterhouse | 8 |
| 9 | (Jamaica) Renae Lloyd | Boys Town F.C. | 6 |
| 9 | (Jamaica) O'Brian Woodbine | Reno | 6 |

Updated to games played on 24 February 2011
Source: Soccerway

== Promotion from Super Leagues ==
The winners of the 4 regional Super Leagues play-off in a home and home round robin series.

- KSAFA Super League - Cavalier
- South Central Confederation Super League - Rivoli United
- Eastern Confederation Super League - Highgate United
- Western Confederation Super League - Seba United

=== Results ===
| Pos | Team | Pld | W | D | L | GF | GA | GD | Pts | Qualification | HIG | SEB | CAV | RIV |
|---|---|---|---|---|---|---|---|---|---|---|---|---|---|---|
| 1 | Highgate United | 6 | 3 | 3 | 0 | 8 | 3 | +5 | 12 | 2011–12 National Premier League | | 0–0 | 2–0 | 1–1 |
| 2 | Seba United | 6 | 2 | 4 | 0 | 7 | 5 | +2 | 10 | 2011–12 National Premier League | 1–1 | | 2–1 | 1–0 |
| 3 | Cavalier | 6 | 2 | 1 | 3 | 4 | 7 | −3 | 7 | | 0–2 | 1–1 | | 1–0 |
| 4 | Rivoli United | 6 | 0 | 2 | 4 | 4 | 8 | −4 | 2 | | 1–2 | 2–2 | 0–1 | |

Legend: Blue = home team win; Yellow = draw; Red = away team win.
Rules for classification: 1) points; 2) goal difference; 3) number of goals scored.
