= 2011–12 National Premier League =

National Premier League
- Season: 2011–12
- Champions: Portmore United
- Caribbean Club Championship: Portmore United; Boys' Town

The 2011–12 Red Stripe Premier League was the highest competitive football league in Jamaica. It was the 38th edition of the competition. The season began in August 2011 and was completed in May 2012. The teams played each other 3 times each then the final 5 games was played amongst the top 6 and bottom 6; making it a total of 38 games each. Tivoli Gardens were the defending champions, having won their fifth Jamaican championship the prior season.

== Teams ==
St. George's and Benfica finished 11th and 12th at the end of last season and both were relegated to the Eastern Confederation Super League.

Taking their places in the league this season are Highgate United, champions of the Eastern Confederation Super League, and Montego Bay United, champions of the Western Confederation Super League, which were the best two clubs in last season's second level promotion playoffs.

Location of teams in the 2011–12 National Premier League

Team	Location	Stadium	Stadium Capacity	Manager
Arnett Gardens	Kingston	Anthony Spaulding Sports Complex	7,000	(Jamaica) Paul "Tegat" Davis
Boys' Town	Kingston	Collie Smith Drive Sporting Complex	2,000	(Jamaica) Andrew Price
Harbour View	Kingston	Harbour View Mini Stadium	7,000	(Jamaica) Donovan Hayles
Highgate United	Highgate	Grays Inn	1,500	(Jamaica) Braxton Hyre
Humble Lions	Clarendon	Effortville Community Centre	1,000	(Jamaica) Lenworth Hyde sr.
Montego Bay United	Montego Bay	Catherine Hall Stadium	8,000	(Brazil) Neider dos Santos
Portmore United	Portmore	Ferdie Neita Sports Complex	2,000	(Jamaica) Calvin Lewis
Reno	Westmoreland	Frome Sports Club	2,000	(Jamaica) Wendell Downswell
Sporting Central Academy	Clarendon	Brancourt Sports Ground, Clarendon Park	2,000	(Jamaica) Nigel Stewart
Tivoli Gardens	Kingston	Railway Oval	3,000	(Jamaica) Glendon "Admiral" Bailey
Village United	Trelawney	Elleston Wakeland Stadium	3,000	(Peru) Danilo Barriga
Waterhouse	Kingston	Waterhouse Stadium	5,000	(Jamaica) Donovan Duckie

== League table ==
Pos	Team	Pld	W	D	L	GF	GA	GD	Pts	Qualification or relegation
1	Portmore United (C)	38	19	10	9	48	37	+11	67	Qualification for 2013 CFU Club Championship
2	Boys' Town	38	18	12	8	44	34	+10	66	Qualification for 2013 CFU Club Championship
3	Waterhouse	38	16	12	10	42	32	+10	60	
4	Humble Lions	38	15	12	11	41	33	+8	57	
5	Tivoli Gardens	38	14	14	10	42	33	+9	56	
6	Harbour View	38	12	17	9	35	31	+4	53	
7	Montego Bay United	38	14	12	12	48	34	+14	54	
8	Arnett Gardens	38	14	11	13	31	39	−8	53	
9	Sporting Central Academy	38	10	13	15	33	48	−15	43	
10	Highgate United	38	9	13	16	30	43	−13	40	
11	Village United	38	7	11	20	28	45	−17	32	Relegation to 2012-13 Jamaican Second Levels
12	Reno	38	5	13	20	28	51	−23	28	Relegation to 2012-13 Jamaican Second Levels

Updated to match(es) played on 4 April 2012. Source: PLCA Jamaica
Rules for classification: 1) points; 2) goal difference; 3) number of goals scored.
(C) Champions

== Results ==
=== Matches 1–22 ===
Home \ Away	ARN	BOY	HAR	HIG	HUM	POR	REN	MBU	SCA	TIV	VIL	WAT
Arnett Gardens		1–2	0–0	0–1	1–5	1–0	2–0	1–2	0–1	1–2	3–1	1–0
Boys' Town	2–0		0–0	1–0	2–2	1–0	0–1	1–1	2–2	2–2	2–1	1–2
Harbour View	1–3	0–0		1–1	1–2	2–1	2–0	0–0	2–0	0–1	2–0	1–1
Highgate United	0–0	2–2	2–2		0–1	0–1	1–0	1–0	0–0	1–1	2–1	0–1
Humble Lions	0–0	2–0	2–0	3–0		1–2	0–0	1–3	1–2	0–0	2–3	0–0
Portmore United	0–1	1–0	0–0	0–0	1–0		4–1	2–1	2–1	2–0	2–0	1–0
Reno	1–1	0–0	0–2	1–1	2–3	0–0		3–2	0–0	0–0	3–2	0–1
Montego Bay United	1–0	1–1	0–2	6–0	0–0	3–3	2–3		1–1	1–1	1–0	3–1
Sporting Central Academy	3–1	0–3	1–1	0–0	0–2	1–2	1–1	1–0		0–2	1–0	0–2
Tivoli Gardens	0–2	3–1	1–2	1–1	3–1	1–0	1–0	2–1	1–1		0–1	1–1
Village United	1–2	0–1	0–2	1–0	1–2	2–0	0–1	0–1	1–2	0–0		0–0
Waterhouse	0–2	1–2	1–1	3–2	1–0	1–2	2–1	1–0	2–0	2–0	4–1	

Updated to match(es) played on 8 January 2012. Source:
Legend: Blue = home team win; Yellow = draw; Red = away team win.

=== Matches 23–33 ===
Home \ Away	ARN	BOY	HAR	HIG	HUM	POR	REN	MBU	SCA	TIV	VIL	WAT
Arnett Gardens		0–1	1–0			2–3		1–2		1–2		2–1
Boys' Town			2–0		0–0		1–0			2–1	0–0	
Harbour View					0–0		3–1			0–0	0–0	1–1
Highgate United	0–0	0–1	3–0		0–1			2–0			2–2	
Humble Lions	0–0					1–1	1–0		0–1	1–0		1–1
Portmore United		2–4	0–1	1–0				1–0	1–0			
Reno	1–2			0–1		0–2			1–1	0–0		0–1
Montego Bay United		0–0	1–1		1–2		2–0				2–0	
Sporting Central Academy	1–1	1–0	1–2	1–0				1–0			0–1	
Tivoli Gardens				2–0		1–2		2–2	2–0			3–0
Village United	1–1				0–0	2–2	0–1			0–0		0–1
Waterhouse		0–0		1–0		1–2		1–1	2–0			

Updated to match(es) played on pre-season. Source:
Legend: Blue = home team win; Yellow = draw; Red = away team win.

=== Matches 34–38 ===
==== Top six ====
Home \ Away	TBD1	TBD2	TBD3	TBD4	TBD5	TBD6
TBD						
TBD						
TBD						
TBD						
TBD						
TBD						

Updated to match(es) played on pre-season. Source:
Legend: Blue = home team win; Yellow = draw; Red = away team win.

==== Bottom six ====
Home \ Away	TBD1	TBD2	TBD3	TBD4	TBD5	TBD6
TBD						
TBD						
TBD						
TBD						
TBD						
TBD						

Updated to match(es) played on pre-season. Source:
Legend: Blue = home team win; Yellow = draw; Red = away team win.

== Top goalscorers ==
Rank	Scorer	Team	Goals
1	(Jamaica) Jermaine Anderson	Waterhouse	14
2	(Jamaica) Alanzo Adlam	Portmore United	12
3	(Jamaica) Romeo Parkes	Highgate United and Tivoli Gardens	11
5	(Jamaica) Dino Williams	Village United	10
5	(Jamaica) Micheal Campbell	Boys Town F.C.	10
7	(Jamaica) Mouricio Gordon	Montego Bay United	9
7	(Jamaica) Tremaine Stewart	Portmore United	9

Updated to games played on 27 April 2012
Source: plcajamaica

== Promotion from Super Leagues ==
The winners of the 4 regional Super Leagues play-off in a home and home round robin series.

- KSAFA Super League - Cavaliers
- South Central Confederation Super League - New Green Community
- Eastern Confederation Super League - Volvo United FC
- Western Confederation Super League - Savannah FC

=== Results ===
Pos	Team	Pld	W	D	L	GF	GA	GD	Pts	Qualification
1	TBD	0	0	0	0	0	0	0	0	2012–13 National Premier League
2	TBD	0	0	0	0	0	0	0	0	2012–13 National Premier League
3	TBD	0	0	0	0	0	0	0	0	
4	TBD	0	0	0	0	0	0	0	0	

Updated to match(es) played on pre-season. Source:
Rules for classification: 1) points; 2) goal difference; 3) number of goals scored.

Home \ Away	TBD1	TBD2	TBD3	TBD4
TBD				
TBD				
TBD				
TBD				

Updated to match(es) played on pre-season. Source:
Legend: Blue = home team win; Yellow = draw; Red = away team win.
