= 2017–18 National Premier League =

National Premier League
- Season: 2017–18
- Champions: Portmore United; 6th title
- Relegated: Sandals South Coast; Boys' Town
- Caribbean Club Championship: Portmore United; Waterhouse
- Matches: 198
- Goals: 436 (2.2 per match)
- Top goalscorer: (Jamaica) Craig Foster; 17 goals
- Biggest home win: Arnett Gardens 5-0 Reno
- Biggest away win: Waterhouse 0-5 Portmore United; Sandals South Coast 0-5 Arnett Gardens
- Highest scoring: Cavalier 3-4 Arnett Gardens

The 2017–18 Red Stripe Premier League is the highest competitive football league in Jamaica. It is the 44th edition of the competition. The regular season started on September 24, 2017. Arnett Gardens are the defending champions, having won their 5th title last season.

== Teams ==
Maverley Hughenden and Jamalco finished 11th and 12th in last season's competition and were relegated to their respective regional Super Leagues, the KSAFA Super League and South Central Confederation Super League respectively. At the end of last season, the champions of the four Super Leagues participated in a promotion playoff double round-robin tournament. Cavalier and Sandals South Coast finished 1st and 2nd after the playoff and were promoted to the National Premier League for this season.

Location of teams in the 2017–18 National Premier League

Team	Location	Stadium	Stadium Capacity	Manager
Arnett Gardens	Kingston	Anthony Spaulding Sports Complex	7,000	(Jamaica) Jerome Waite
Boys' Town	Kingston	Collie Smith Drive Sporting Complex	2,000	(Jamaica) Andrew Price
Cavalier	Kingston	Stadium East	2,000	(Jamaica) Rudolph Speid
Harbour View	Kingston	Harbour View Mini Stadium	7,000	(Jamaica) Ricardo Gardner
Humble Lions	Clarendon	Effortville Community Centre	1,000	(Jamaica)
Montego Bay United	Montego Bay	Montego Bay Sports Complex, WesPow Park	9,000	(United States) Tim Hankinson
Portmore United	Portmore	Ferdie Neita Sports Complex	3,000	(Jamaica) Shavar Thomas
Reno	Westmoreland Parish	Frome Sports Club	2,000	(Jamaica) Wendell Downswell
Sandals South Coast	Westmoreland Parish	Frome Sports Club	2,000	(Jamaica) Aaron Lawrence
Tivoli Gardens	Kingston	Railway Oval	3,000	(Jamaica) Omar Edwards
UWI	Kingston	UWI Bowl	2,000	(Jamaica) Marcel Gayle
Waterhouse	Kingston	Waterhouse Stadium	5,000	(Jamaica) Donavan Duckie

== Regular season ==
Pos	Team	Pld	W	D	L	GF	GA	GD	Pts	Qualification or relegation
1	Portmore United (C)	33	20	6	7	62	25	+37	66	Qualification for Semi-Finals
2	Arnett Gardens	33	11	18	4	53	37	+16	51	Qualification for Semi-Finals
3	Tivoli Gardens	33	14	8	11	37	28	+9	50	Qualification for Quarterfinals
4	Waterhouse	33	12	14	7	33	32	+1	50	Qualification for Quarterfinals
5	Harbour View	33	14	7	12	28	22	+6	49	Qualification for Quarterfinals
6	Cavalier	33	12	12	9	39	32	+7	48	Qualification for Quarterfinals
7	UWI	33	13	9	11	41	37	+4	48	
8	Humble Lions	33	11	13	9	39	30	+9	46	
9	Montego Bay United	33	10	11	12	33	40	−7	41	
10	Reno	33	9	12	12	25	37	−12	39	
11	Sandals South Coast (R)	33	5	7	21	25	60	−35	22	Relegation to Regional confederations
12	Boys' Town (R)	33	4	9	20	24	59	−35	21	Relegation to Regional confederations

Updated to match(es) played on 21 March 2018. Source:
Rules for classification: 1) points; 2) goal difference; 3) number of goals scored.
(C) Champions; (R) Relegated

== Results ==
=== Regular home games ===
Home \ Away	ARN	BOY	CAV	HAR	HUM	MBU	POR	REN	SSC	TIV	UWI	WAT
Arnett Gardens		1–1	0–0	2–1	1–1	1–0	2–2	5–0	3–1	0–0	2–1	1–1
Boys' Town	1–1		1–1	1–2	1–2	0–0	1–4	0–0	2–1	2–4	1–2	1–2
Cavalier	2–2	4–1		0–1	2–0	0–0	0–0	4–0	2–1	0–1	1–1	1–1
Harbour View	1–2	3–0	0–1		0–1	1–1	0–1	0–1	0–0	2–0	1–0	0–0
Humble Lions	1–1	1–1	5–1	0–0		1–1	0–1	1–1	4–0	1–0	1–3	0–0
Montego Bay United	1–1	0–1	1–2	3–2	0–1		1–2	1–1	3–1	0–0	0–1	1–0
Portmore United	0–0	2–0	1–0	0–1	3–0	0–0		3–0	3–1	1–1	0–1	2–1
Reno	2–0	1–2	0–1	0–1	2–1	0–1	3–0		2–2	1–0	0–0	0–0
Sandals South Coast	1–1	1–0	1–1	1–0	1–0	0–0	0–4	1–2		0–1	1–4	1–2
Tivoli Gardens	0–1	3–0	1–1	1–0	2–0	0–1	1–2	2–0	0–0		0–0	0–1
UWI F.C.	1–4	2–1	0–1	0–1	1–1	3–0	3–0	0–2	2–0	1–0		1–1
Waterhouse	1–1	1–1	0–2	1–0	1–2	2–1	0–5	1–1	1–0	1–2	2–1	

Legend: Blue = home team win; Yellow = draw; Red = away team win.

=== Additional home games ===
Home \ Away	ARN	BOY	CAV	HAR	HUM	MBU	POR	REN	SSC	TIV	UWI	WAT
Arnett Gardens					2–2	3–0		0–0		2–3	2–2	1–1
Boys' Town	2–1				1–1	0–3	0–4				0–2	0–3
Cavalier	3–4	1–1			0–1		3–0		2–1			
Harbour View	0–0	1–0	2–0				2–1		0–0			
Humble Lions				0–1		4–0		0–0		1–1		0–0
Montego Bay United			0–1	2–0				2–1		2–1		2–2
Portmore United	5–1				2–0	5–1				2–0	5–1	0–1
Reno		1–0	0–0	0–2			0–0		1–4		0–0	
Sandals South Coast	0–5	1–0			0–3	2–4	0–2					
Tivoli Gardens		3–1	3–1	2–0				1–2	1–0		3–2	
UWI F.C.			2–1	0–0	0–3	1–1			3–1			
Waterhouse			0–0	1–3				2–1	2–1	0–0	1–0	

Legend: Blue = home team win; Yellow = draw; Red = away team win.

== Playoffs ==
=== Bracket ===
Quarterfinals
3	Tivoli Gardens	0	0	0
6	Cavalier	0	2	2
4	Waterhouse	1	2	3
5	Harbour View	0	1	1

Semifinals
1	Portmore United	0	3	3
6	Cavalier	0	0	0
2	Arnett Gardens	0	1	1
4	Waterhouse	1	2	3

Finals
1	Portmore United	0 (4)
4	Waterhouse	0 (3)

=== Results ===
==== Quarterfinals ====
2 April 2018
20:35 UTC-5

Harbour View	0 – 1	Waterhouse
	Soccerway	89' K. Simpson

Harbour View Mini Stadium, Kingston
Referee: Cardella Samuels
5 April 2018
19:30 UTC-5

Waterhouse	2 – 1	Harbour View
C. Benbow 2'; K. Beckford 90'	Soccerway	45' M. Blackburn

Drewsland Stadium, Kingston
Referee: Oshane Nation

1 April 2018
18:00 UTC-5

Cavalier	0 – 0	Tivoli Gardens
	Soccerway

Anthony Spaulding Sports Complex, Kingston
Referee: Odette Hamilton
4 April 2018
15:05 UTC-5

Tivoli Gardens	0 – 2	Cavalier
	Soccerway	26' N. Daley; 30' A. Marshall

Railway Oval, Kingston
Referee: Karl Tyrell

==== Semifinals ====
The winners of these ties will qualify for the CFU Club Championship.

8 April 2018
18:00 UTC-5

Cavalier	0 – 0	Portmore United
	Soccerway

Stadium East, Kingston
Referee: Daneon Parchment
15 April 2018
15:00 UTC-5

Portmore United	3 – 0	Cavalier
J. East 5', 72'; J. Lynch 48'	Soccerway

Prison Oval, Spanish Town

9 April 2018
20:35 UTC-5

Waterhouse	1 – 0	Arnett Gardens
T. Stewart 55'	Soccerway

Drewsland Stadium, Kingston
Referee: Kevin Morrison
16 April 2018
20:35 UTC-5

Arnett Gardens	1 – 2	Waterhouse
S. Clarke 10'	Soccerway	12' C. Benbow; 53' T. Stewart

Anthony Spaulding Sports Complex, Kingston

==== Finals ====
23 April 2018
20:35 UTC-5

Portmore United	0 – 0 (a.e.t.)	Waterhouse
	Soccerway
Penalties
	4 – 3

Independence Park, Kingston
Referee: Oshane Nation

== Top goalscorers ==
Rank	Scorer	Team	Goals
1	(Jamaica) Craig Foster	Humble Lions	17
2	(Jamaica) Fabian Reid	Arnett Gardens	16
3	(Jamaica) Javon East	Portmore United	12
-	(Jamaica) Ryan Miller	UWI FC	12
5	(Jamaica) Kemar Beckford	Waterhouse	11
-	(Jamaica) Ricardo Morris	Portmore United	11
7	(Jamaica) Dino Williams	Montego Bay United	10
8	(Jamaica) Jeremie Lynch	Portmore United	9
-	(Jamaica) Chevone Marsh	Cavalier	9
10	(Jamaica) Colorado Murray	Tivoli Gardens	8
-	(Jamaica) Andre Moulton	Tivoli Gardens	8
