= 2008–09 National Premier League =

National Premier League
- Season: 2008–09
- Champions: Tivoli Gardens
- Matches played: 228
- Goals scored: 503 (2.21 per match)

The 2008–09 National Premier League (NPL), the first division football league in the nation of Jamaica known as the Digicel National Premier League for sponsorship purposes, was contested by 12 teams. and after 33 matches was split into a champions group and relegation group. Both groups then play 5 more matches within that group.

== League table ==
Team	Pld	W	D	L	GF	GA	GD	Pts
Tivoli Gardens	38	21	9	8	51	27	+24	72
Portmore United	38	20	12	6	43	21	+22	72
Harbour View	38	18	15	5	51	26	+25	69
Boys' Town	38	16	9	13	55	48	+7	57
Arnett Gardens	38	15	11	12	35	30	+5	56
Waterhouse	38	12	13	13	44	45	−1	49
Rivoli United	38	12	9	17	39	53	−14	45
St. George's	38	11	10	17	34	46	−12	43
Village United	38	9	13	16	34	52	−18	40
Sporting Central Academy	38	9	12	17	38	48	−10	39
Meadhaven United	38	9	12	17	36	52	−16	39
Reno	38	5	17	16	43	55	−12	32

== Top goalscorers ==
Rank	Name	Club	Goals
1	Greg Gardner	Rivoli United	13
2	Luke Soares	Rivoli United	12
3	George Vernal	Boys' Town F.C.	9
4	Devon Hodges	Rivoli United	7
5	Weston Forrest	Meadhaven United	6
5	Rohan Reid	Meadhaven United	6
5	Leon Strickland	Arnett Gardens	6
5	Raymond Williamson	Meadhaven United	6
5	Valentino Gardener	Rivoli United	6
5	Norman Bailey	Meadhaven United	6
