= 2013–14 National Premier League =

National Premier League
- Season: 2013–14
- Champions: Montego Bay United
- Caribbean Club Championship: Montego Bay United; Waterhouse

The 2013–14 Red Stripe Premier League was the highest competitive football league in Jamaica. It was the 40th edition of the competition. The season began on September 15 and ended in May 19. The teams played each other 3 times each, after which the top eight teams entered a knock-out playoff to decide the champions. Harbour View were the defending champions, having won their fourth Jamaican championship the previous season.

== Teams ==
Rivoli United and August Town FC were promoted following the RSPL Promotion playoffs. Reno FC and Savannah FC both from Westmoreland were relegated at the end of the 2012–2013 season.

Team	Location	Stadium	Stadium Capacity	Manager
Arnett Gardens	Kingston	Anthony Spaulding Sports Complex	7,000	(Jamaica) Calvin Lewis
Boys' Town	Kingston	Collie Smith Drive Sporting Complex	2,000	(Jamaica) Andrew Price
Harbour View	Kingston	Harbour View Mini Stadium	7,000	(Jamaica)
Rivoli United	Spanish Town	Prison Oval	1,500	(Jamaica)
Humble Lions	Clarendon	Effortville Community Centre	1,000	(Jamaica) Lenny Hyde
Montego Bay United	Montego Bay	Catherine Hall Stadium	8,000	(Jamaica) Donovan Duckie
Portmore United	Portmore	Ferdie Neita Sports Complex	2,000	(Jamaica)
August Town	Kingston	UWI Bowl	2,000	(Jamaica)
Sporting Central Academy	Clarendon	Brancourt Sports Ground, Clarendon Park	2,000	(Jamaica)
Tivoli Gardens	Kingston	Railway Oval	3,000	(Jamaica) Glendon "Admiral" Bailey
Cavalier	Kingston	Stadium East Field	1,000	(Jamaica)
Waterhouse	Kingston	Waterhouse Stadium	5,000	(Jamaica)

== League table ==
Pos	Team	Pld	W	D	L	GF	GA	GD	Pts	Qualification or relegation
1	Waterhouse	33	19	8	6	46	24	+22	65	Qualification for 2015 CFU Club Championship
2	Harbour View	33	15	11	7	44	26	+18	56	
3	Montego Bay United (C)	33	14	11	8	32	21	+11	53	Qualification for 2015 CFU Club Championship
4	Arnett Gardens	33	15	7	11	48	33	+15	52	
5	Tivoli Gardens	33	12	9	12	39	38	+1	45	
6	Rivoli United	33	11	11	11	29	35	−6	44	
7	Humble Lions	33	9	14	10	36	39	−3	41	
8	Cavalier	33	11	7	15	27	43	−16	40	
9	Boys' Town	33	8	14	11	30	30	0	38	
10	Sporting Central Academy	33	9	11	13	29	37	−8	38	
11	Portmore United	33	8	9	16	26	35	−9	33	Relegation to 2014-15 Jamaican Second Levels
12	August Town	33	5	12	16	20	46	−26	27	Relegation to 2014-15 Jamaican Second Levels

Rules for classification: 1) points; 2) goal difference; 3) number of goals scored.
(C) Champions

== Semifinals ==
=== First legs ===
7 May 2014	Harbour View	2 – 2	Montego Bay United	Kingston
				Stadium: Harbour View Stadium

8 May 2014	Waterhouse	3 – 3	Arnett Gardens	Kingston

=== Second legs ===
11 May 2014	Montego Bay United	1 – 0	Harbour View	Montego Bay
			Dino Williams

Montego Bay United wins series 3–2 on aggregate

12 May 2014	Arnett Gardens	1 – 2	Waterhouse	Kingston

Waterhouse wins series 5–4 on aggregate

== Finals ==
19 May 2014	Waterhouse	2 – 5	Montego Bay United	Kingston
				Stadium: Independence Park, Kingston

National Premier League champions:
Montego Bay United
3rd title

== Top goalscorers ==
Rank	Scorer	Team	Goals
1	(Jamaica) Brian Brown	Harbour View F.C.	18
2	(Jamaica) Devon Hodges	Rivoli United F.C.	17
3	(Jamaica) Francois Swaby	Sporting Central Academy	14
4	(Jamaica) Girvon Brown	Cavalier F.C.	12
5	(Jamaica) Dino Williams	Montego Bay United F.C.	11
6	(Jamaica) Newton Sterling	Arnett Gardens F.C.	10
7	(Jamaica) Omando McLeod	Humble Lions F.C.	8
7	(Jamaica) Damarley Samuels	Waterhouse F.C.	8
9	(Jamaica) Rafiek Thomas	Boys' Town F.C.	7
9	(Jamaica) Roberto Fletcher	Humble Lions F.C.	7
9	(Jamaica) Kirk Ramsay	Arnett Gardens F.C.	7
9	(Jamaica) Hughan Gray	Waterhouse F.C.	7

== Individual awards ==
=== Monthly awards ===
Month	CHEC Player of the Month				CHEC Coach of the Month			
Month	Player	Nat	Club	Link	Coach	Nat	Club	Link
September 2013	Raymond Williamson	JAM	Rivoli United F.C.	5G 0A^{[usurped]}	Harold Thomas	JAM	Harbour View F.C.	[]
October 2013	Raymond Williamson	JAM	Rivoli United F.C.	0G 0A^{[usurped]}	Harold Thomas	JAM	Harbour View F.C.	[]
November 2013		JAM				JAM		[]
December 2013	Adoah Nickle	JAM	Portmore United F.C.	3G 0A^{[usurped]}		JAM		[]
January 2014	Ricardo Morris	JAM	Portmore United F.C.	2G 0A^{[usurped]}		JAM		[]
February 2014	Devon Haughton	JAM	August Town F.C.	0G 0A	Anthony Patrick	JAM	Waterhouse F.C.	[]
March 2014	Omando McLeod	JAM	Humble Lions F.C.	3G 0A		JAM		[]
April 2014	Richard McCallum	JAM	Waterhouse F.C.	0G 0A	Anthony Patrick	JAM	Waterhouse F.C.	[]
May 2014		JAM				JAM		[]

== Promotion from Super Leagues ==
The winners of the 4 regional Super Leagues play-off in a home and home round robin series.

- KSAFA Super League - TBD
- South Central Confederation Super League - TBD
- Eastern Confederation Super League - TBD
- Western Confederation Super League - TBD
