= 2007–08 National Premier League =

Jamaican football league

Wray & Nephew National Premier League
- Season: 2007–08
- Champions: Portmore United F.C.
- Relegated: August Town F.C. & Seba United F.C.
- Caribbean Club Championship: Portmore United F.C.
- Goals scored: 47
- Top goalscorer: Roen Nelson
- Highest scoring: Portmore United F.C.

The 2007–08 National Premier League (known as the Wray & Nephew National Premier League for sponsorship purposes) was contested by the twelve teams in the top tier of association football in Jamaica. The league was split into a champions group and relegation group after 33 matches. Both groups then played five more matches within that group.

The Parish of St. James will be without a team in the 2008/09 NPL season for the first time in history.

The main sponsor of the league was terminated due to non-payment.

== Final league table ==
Team	Pld	W	D	L	GF	GA	GD	Pts
Portmore United F.C.	33	18	10	5	47	21	+26	64
Tivoli Gardens F.C.	33	18	5	10	42	34	+8	59
Boys' Town F.C.	33	12	14	7	29	25	+4	50
Harbour View F.C.	33	11	14	8	39	32	+7	47
Waterhouse F.C.	33	10	15	8	36	35	+1	45
Sporting Central Academy	33	9	12	12	36	44	−8	39
St. George's SC	33	10	9	14	37	38	−1	39
Village United F.C.	33	9	12	12	32	34	−2	39
Seba United F.C.	33	9	11	13	39	44	−5	38
Arnett Gardens F.C.	33	6	17	10	30	32	−2	35
August Town F.C.	33	8	10	15	33	48	−15	34
Reno F.C.	33	6	15	12	35	48	−13	33
