= JFF Champions Cup =

- Organiser(s): Jamaica Football Federation (JFF)
- Founded: 1990
- Region: Jamaica
- Teams: 24
- Current champions: Portmore United F.C. (5th title)
- Most championships: Portmore United F.C. (5 titles)
- Website: jamaicafootballfederation.com/cup

The JFF Champions Cup, known since 2022 as the Lynk Cup, is an annual knockout tournament in Jamaican football. The modern tournament was established during the 1990–91 season and is contended between the 14 Jamaica Premier League clubs and 10 JFF National Tier II clubs.

The current cup holders are Portmore United having defeated Cavalier 2–0 in the 2023 Lynk Cup Final. The title is Portmore United's fifth overall win in the competition.

== Winners ==
All-Island Knockout Championship

- 1964: Cavalier SC (Kingston)

National Knockout Competition

- 1972: Cavalier SC (Kingston)
- 1978: Cavalier SC (Kingston) [shared; other winners unknown]

=== JNBS Federation (FA) Cup ===
- 1990–91 : Olympic Gardens 1–0 Hazard United
- 1991–92 : Seba United
- 1992–93 : Olympic Gardens
- 1993–94 : Harbour View F.C.
- 1994–95 : Seba United
- 1995–96 : Reno F.C. 1–0 Arnett Gardens F.C.
- 1996–97 : Naggo Head F.C. 1–0 Hazard United
- 1997–98 : Harbour View F.C. 1–0 Waterhouse F.C. (asdet)
- 1998–99 : Tivoli Gardens F.C. 2–0 Violet Kickers F.C.
- 1999–00 : Hazard United 1–0 Wadadah F.C.
- 2000–01 : Harbour View F.C. 3–0 Wadadah F.C.
- 2001–02 : Harbour View F.C. 2–1 Rivoli United F.C.
- 2002–03 : Hazard United 0–1 Harbour View F.C.
- 2003–04 : Waterhouse F.C. 2–1 Village United F.C.

=== Red Stripe Champions Cup ===
- 2004–05 : Portmore United F.C. 3–1 Harbour View F.C.
- 2005–06 : Tivoli Gardens F.C. 3–2 Portmore United F.C. (aet)
- 2006–07 : Portmore United F.C. 2–1 Boys' Town F.C. (aet, 4–3 pen)

=== City of Kingston (COK) Co-operative Credit Union Champions Cup ===
(COK took over as competition sponsors at the end of the Red Stripe Sponsorship in 2007)

- 2007–08 : Waterhouse F.C. 2–0 Tivoli Gardens F.C.

=== Flow All-Island Champions Cup ===
(Flow took over as main competition sponsors, in conjunction with Sportsmax and JNBS, at the beginning of 2009)

- 2008–09 : Boys' Town F.C. 3–0 Tivoli Gardens F.C.
- 2009–10 : Boys' Town F.C. 3–2 Humble Lions F.C.
- 2010–11 : Tivoli Gardens F.C. 3–0 St. George's S.C.
- 2011–12 : not held
- 2012–13 : not held
- 2013 : Waterhouse F.C. 2–2 Tivoli Gardens F.C. (aet, 3–1 pen)
- 2014 : Reno F.C. 4–3 Montego Bay United F.C.

=== Lynk Cup ===
(Lynk took over as title sponsors in 2022, signing a multi-year deal)

- 2022–23: Portmore United F.C. 2–0 Cavalier F.C.

=== Popeye's Challenge Cup ===
(Popeyes Jamaica took over as title sponsors in 2026, signing a multi-year deal)

- 2026: Mount Pleasant FA 5–1 Molynes United

== Winners by Club ==
Number of Wins (24) (since 1990)
Club	Titles	Championship Year(s)
Portmore United	5	1999–2000, 2002–03, 2004–05, 2006–07, 2022–23
Harbour View	4	1993–94, 1997–98, 2000–01, 2001–02
Tivoli Gardens	3	1998–99, 2005–06, 2010–11
Waterhouse	3	2003–04, 2007–08, 2013
Boys' Town F.C.	2	2008–09, 2009–10
Olympic Gardens	2	1990–91, 1992–93
Reno F.C.	2	1995–96, 2014
Seba United	2	1991–92, 1994–95
Naggo Head F.C.	1	1996–97
Mount Pleasant FA	1	2026
