= 2006–07 National Premier League =

Season of association football in Jamaica

Wray & Nephew National Premier League
- Season: 2006–07
- Champions: Harbour View
- Relegated: Wadadah; Naggo Head
- CFU Club Championship: Harbour View
- Goals: 67
- Top goalscorer: Irvino English
- Highest scoring: Harbour View

The 2006–07 National Premier League (known as the Wray & Nephew National Premier League for sponsorship purposes) was contested by the twelve teams in the top tier of association football in Jamaica. The season began on September 10, 2006 and ended on April 29, 2007. The league was split into a champions group and relegation group after 33 matches. Both groups then played five more matches within that group.

Harbour View won the league to earn their 2nd National Premier League title in a 3–0 victory against Village United.

== League table ==
Pos	Team	Pld	W	D	L	GF	GA	GD	Pts	Qualification
1	Harbour View (C)	33	22	8	3	67	30	+37	74	CFU Club Championship
2	Portmore United	33	17	13	3	48	19	+29	64	
3	Reno	33	16	8	9	51	37	+14	56	
4	Waterhouse	33	13	13	7	55	29	+26	52	
5	Tivoli Gardens	33	13	13	7	46	31	+15	52	
6	August Town	33	12	8	13	38	41	−3	44	
7	Village United	33	11	10	12	26	34	−8	43	
8	Arnett Gardens	33	11	5	17	41	46	−5	38	
9	Boys' Town	33	8	12	13	33	44	−11	36	
10	Seba United	33	9	6	18	34	54	−20	33	
11	Wadadah (C)	33	6	8	19	34	69	−35	26	Relegated to JFF Championship
12	Naggo Head (C)	33	5	6	22	26	65	−39	21	Relegated to JFF Championship

(C) Champions

== Top goalscorers ==
Rank	Scorer	Team	Goals
1	(Jamaica) Irvino English	Waterhouse	18
2	(Jamaica) Kavin Bryan	Harbour View	17
3	(Jamaica) Fabian Taylor	Harbour View	15
4	(Jamaica) Ricardo Scott	Reno	13
5	(Jamaica) Leon Strickland	Arnett Gardens	11
6	(Jamaica) Brian Wollaston	Waterhouse	10
6	(Jamaica) Kirk Wright	Reno	10
6	(Jamaica) Wilfred Smith	Seba United	10
7	(Jamaica) Carlington Smith	Portmore United	9
7	(Jamaica) George Vernal	Boys' Town	9
