= 2015–16 National Premier League =

National Premier League
- Season: 2015–16
- Champions: Montego Bay United
- Relegated: Rivoli United; Cavalier
- Caribbean Club Championship: Montego Bay United; Portmore United
- Top goalscorer: (Jamaica) Dino Williams : 15 goals.
- Biggest home win: Arnett Gardens 6-0 Reno F.C., February 14, 2016.
- Biggest away win: Rivoli United 3-4 Boys' Town, October 4, 2015.
- Highest scoring: Waterhouse 4-4 Cavalier, December 20, 2015.
- Longest winning run: Arnett Gardens: 5 games.
- Longest unbeaten run: Arnett Gardens: 11 games.
- Longest losing run: Rivoli United: 4 games.

The 2015–16 Red Stripe Premier League is the highest competitive football league in Jamaica. It is the 42nd edition of the competition. It started on September 6, 2015 and ended on May 17, 2016.

== Changes from 2014–15 ==
- UWI F.C. and Portmore United were promoted from the Jamaican Major Leagues (second tier football).
- Barbican and Sporting Central Academy were relegated to the Jamaican Major Leagues (second tier football).

== Teams ==
Team information at the start of the 2015-2016 season

Team	Location	Stadium	Stadium Capacity	Manager
Arnett Gardens	Kingston	Anthony Spaulding Sports Complex	7,000	(Jamaica) Jerome Waite
Boys' Town	Kingston	Collie Smith Drive Sporting Complex	2,000	(Jamaica) Andrew Price
Cavalier	Kingston	Stadium East Field	1,000	(Jamaica) Rudolph Speid
Harbour View	Kingston	Harbour View Mini Stadium	7,000	(Jamaica) Ludlow Bernard
Humble Lions	Clarendon	Effortville Community Centre	1,000	(Jamaica) Linval Wilson
Montego Bay United	Montego Bay	Catherine Hall Stadium	9,000	(United States) Tim Hankinson
Portmore United	Kingston	Ferdie Neita Sports Complex	3,000	(Jamaica) Linval Dixon
Reno F.C.	Savannah-la-mar	Frome	2,000	(Jamaica) Wendell Downswell
Rivoli United	Spanish Town	Prison Oval	1,500	(Jamaica) Harold Thomas
Tivoli Gardens	Kingston	Railway Oval	3,000	(Jamaica) Christopher Bender
UWI F.C.	Kingston	UWI Bowl	2,000	(Jamaica) Marcel Gayle
Waterhouse	Kingston	Waterhouse Stadium	5,000	(Jamaica) Calvert Fitzgerald

== Managerial Changes ==
Manager	Club	Status	Date	Replacement
(Jamaica) Calvert Fitzgerald	Waterhouse	Resigned	October 14, 2015	(Jamaica) Anthony Patrick (Interim)
(United States) Tim Hankinson	Montego Bay United	Resigned	November, 2015	(Brazil) Leonardo Neiva
(Jamaica) Linval Wilson	Humble Lions		November, 2015	Vassell Reynolds (Technical Director)
(Jamaica) Anthony Patrick (Interim)	Waterhouse		December 10, 2015	Paul Young
(Brazil) Leonardo Neiva	Montego Bay United	Unable to get work permit	January 2016	(Jamaica) Paul 'Tegat' Davis
(Jamaica) Christopher Bender	Tivoli Gardens	Sacked	January 2016	(Jamaica) Glendon 'Admiral' Bailey
(Jamaica) Paul young	Waterhouse	Mutual Consent	February 17, 2016	(Jamaica) Anthony Patrick

- Linval Wilson is still the head coach of Humble Lions.

== League table ==
Pos	Team	Pld	W	D	L	GF	GA	GD	Pts	Qualification or relegation
1	Portmore United	33	18	7	8	42	29	+13	61	Qualification for Playoffs
2	Arnett Gardens	33	18	6	9	49	29	+20	60	Qualification for Playoffs
3	Montego Bay United	33	16	11	6	53	26	+27	59	Qualification for Playoffs
4	Humble Lions	33	13	11	9	30	27	+3	50	Qualification for Playoffs
5	UWI	33	13	10	10	39	41	−2	49	
6	Harbour View	33	10	13	10	39	34	+5	43	
7	Tivoli Gardens	33	12	7	14	39	40	−1	43	
8	Boys' Town	33	10	8	15	35	52	−17	38	
9	Waterhouse	33	8	10	15	32	40	−8	34	
10	Reno	33	7	13	13	35	54	−19	34	
11	Rivoli United	33	8	9	16	38	47	−9	33	Relegation to Regional confederations
12	Cavalier	33	8	9	16	24	36	−12	33	Relegation to Regional confederations

Source: Soccerway
Rules for classification: 1) points; 2) goal difference; 3) number of goals scored.

== Playoffs ==
The two finalists qualify for the 2017 Caribbean Club Championship. All times EST (UTC−5).

=== Bracket ===
Semi-Finals
1	Portmore United	1	3	4
4	Humble Lions	2	1	3
2	Arnett Gardens	1	2	3
3	Montego Bay United (a.e.t.)	2	2	4

Finals
1	Portmore United	1
3	Montego Bay United	2

=== Semi-finals ===
Game One

10 April 2016
15:30

Humble Lions	2 – 1	Portmore United
Cousins 59'; Swaby 67'		Ricketts 75'

The Effortville Mini Stadium, May Pen

11 April 2016
20:30

Montego Bay United	2 – 1	Arnett Gardens
Gordon 23'; Rodney 43'		Martin 34'

WespoW Park, Montego Bay

Game Two

17 April 2016
18:00

Arnett Gardens	2 – 2 (a.e.t.)	Montego Bay United
Malcolm 83' (pen.); Harris 90+5'		Hilton 45+1'; Brown 113'

Tony Spaulding Sports Complex, Kingston

Montego Bay United advanced 4–3 on aggregate.

18 April 2016
20:40

Portmore United	3 – 1	Humble Lions
Binns 8', 22' (pen.); Stewart 76'		Wolfe 64'

Ferdi Neita Sports Complex, Portmore

Portmore United advanced 4–3 on aggregate.

=== Final ===
May 1, 2016
16:00

Montego Bay United	2 – 1	Portmore United
Woozencroft 62'; Williams 80'		Binns 73'

WespoW Park, Montego Bay

== Top goalscorers ==
Updated as of March 30, 2016

Rank	Scorer	Team	Goals
1	(Jamaica) Owayne Gordon	Montego Bay United	16
2	(Jamaica) Dino Williams	Montego Bay United	15
3	(Jamaica) Cory Burke	Rivoli United	12
4	(Jamaica) Girvan Brown	UWI	12
5	(Jamaica) Kemal Malcom	Arnett Gardens	12
6	(Jamaica) Rafiek Thomas	Boys' Town	12
7	(Jamaica) Javon East	Portmore United	10
8	(Jamaica) Kenroy Howell	Waterhouse	9
9	(Jamaica) Junior Flemmings	Tivoli Gardens	8
10	(Jamaica) Anthony Grenland	UWI	8
