= 2014–15 National Premier League =

National Premier League
- Season: 2014–15
- Champions: Arnett Gardens
- Relegated: Sporting Central Academy; Barbican
- Caribbean Club Championship: Arnett Gardens and Montego Bay United
- Top goalscorer: (Jamaica) Craig Foster
- Longest winning run: Arnett Gardens:10 games
- Longest unbeaten run: Arnett Gardens:11 games.

The 2014–15 Red Stripe Premier League is the highest competitive football league in Jamaica. It is the 41st edition of the competition. It was established on September 7, 2014 and ended on June 1, 2015.

== Changes from 2013–14 ==
- Barbican and Reno were promoted from the Jamaican second level
- August Town and Portmore United were relegated to the Jamaican second level

== Teams ==
| Team | Location | Stadium | Stadium Capacity | Manager |
|---|---|---|---|---|
| Arnett Gardens | Kingston | Anthony Spaulding Sports Complex | 7,000 | (Jamaica) Jerome Waite |
| Boys' Town | Kingston | Collie Smith Drive Sporting Complex | 2,000 | (Jamaica) Andrew Price |
| Harbour View | Kingston | Harbour View Mini Stadium | 7,000 | (Jamaica) |
| Rivoli United | Spanish Town | Prison Oval | 1,500 | (Jamaica) Calvert Fitzgerald |
| Humble Lions | Clarendon | Effortville Community Centre | 1,000 | (Jamaica) Lenworth Hyde Sr. |
| Montego Bay United | Montego Bay | Catherine Hall Stadium | 8,000 | (Spain) Carlos Aitor García |
| Barbican | Kingston | UWI Bowl | 2,000 | (Jamaica) Junior Francis |
| Reno F.C. | Savannah-La-Mar | Frome | 2,000 | (Jamaica) |
| Sporting Central Academy | Clarendon | Brancourt Sports Ground, Clarendon Park | 2,000 | (Jamaica) |
| Tivoli Gardens | Kingston | Railway Oval | 3,000 | (Jamaica) Alvin Shaw |
| Cavalier | Kingston | Stadium East Field | 1,000 | (Jamaica) |
| Waterhouse | Kingston | Waterhouse Stadium | 5,000 | (Jamaica) Anthony Patrick |

== League table ==
| Pos | Team | Pld | W | D | L | GF | GA | GD | Pts | Qualification or relegation |
|---|---|---|---|---|---|---|---|---|---|---|
| 1 | Arnett Gardens (C) | 33 | 21 | 6 | 6 | 60 | 36 | +24 | 69 | Qualification for 2016 CFU Club Championship |
| 2 | Waterhouse | 33 | 18 | 6 | 9 | 56 | 28 | +28 | 60 | |
| 3 | Montego Bay United | 33 | 14 | 11 | 8 | 42 | 27 | +15 | 53 | Qualification for 2016 CFU Club Championship |
| 4 | Humble Lions | 33 | 15 | 8 | 10 | 41 | 26 | +15 | 53 | |
| 5 | Harbour View | 33 | 14 | 7 | 12 | 42 | 41 | +1 | 49 | |
| 6 | Tivoli Gardens | 33 | 14 | 5 | 14 | 41 | 44 | −3 | 47 | |
| 7 | Cavalier | 33 | 12 | 7 | 14 | 30 | 32 | −2 | 43 | |
| 8 | Boys' Town | 33 | 12 | 7 | 14 | 37 | 47 | −10 | 43 | |
| 9 | Rivoli United | 33 | 10 | 8 | 15 | 39 | 47 | −8 | 38 | |
| 10 | Reno F.C. | 33 | 9 | 8 | 16 | 45 | 52 | −7 | 35 | |
| 11 | Sporting Central Academy | 33 | 9 | 7 | 17 | 33 | 51 | −18 | 34 | Relegation to 2015-16 Jamaican Confederation Leagues |
| 12 | Barbican | 33 | 5 | 10 | 18 | 26 | 61 | −35 | 25 | Relegation to 2015-16 Jamaican Confederation Leagues |

Rules for classification: 1) points; 2) goal difference; 3) number of goals scored.
(C) Champions

=== Playoffs ===
First Legs

| 14 May 2015 Semifinal | Arnett Gardens | 1 – 1 | Humble Lions | Kingston |
| 6:30pm | Andre Clennon 3' | | Wolry Wolfe 41' (PG) | Stadium: Anthony Spaulding Sports Complex |

| 15 May 2015 Semifinal | Waterhouse | 1 – 3 | Montego Bay United | Kingston |
| 9:00pm | Leslie 90' | | Ottey 62'; Williams 72'; Carey 79' | Stadium: Waterhouse Stadium |

Second Legs

| 17 May 2015 Semifinal | Montego Bay United | 5 – 1 | Waterhouse | Montego Bay |
| 6:30pm | Ottey 28'; Williams 32', 52'; St.Fleur 43'; O.Gordon 90' | | Anderson 45' | Stadium: Catherine Hall Stadium |

| 18 May 2015 Semifinal | Humble Lions | 2 – 3 | Arnett Gardens | Clarendon |
| 9:00pm | Kemeel Wolfe 43'(PG); Ricardo Cousins 49' | | Vishinuel Harris 22'; Jabeur Johnson 45'; Marvin Morgan 82' | Stadium: Effortville Community Centre |

Final

| 1 June 2015 Final | Arnett Gardens | 2 – 0 | Montego Bay United | Kingston |
| 9:00pm | Clennon 60'; Strickland | [ Report] [ Report] | | Stadium: National Stadium; Attendance: 18, 000 |

== Top goalscorers ==
As of June 3, 2015

| Rank | Scorer | Team | Goals |
|---|---|---|---|
| 1 | (Jamaica) Craig Foster | Reno | 20 |
| 2 | (Jamaica) Jermaine Anderson | Waterhouse | 18 |
| 3 | (Jamaica) Rafiek Thomas | Boys' Town | 16 |
| 4 | (Jamaica) Cory Burke | Rivoli United | 11 |
| 4 | (Jamaica) Ranique Muir | Harbour View | 11 |
| 4 | (Jamaica) Franics Swaby | Humble Lions | 11 |
| 7 | (Jamaica) Kemar Beckford | Rivoli United | 10 |
| 7 | (Jamaica) Leon Strickland | Arnett Gardens | 10 |
| 9 | (Jamaica) Dino Williams | Montego Bay United | 9 |
| 10 | (Jamaica) Girvan Brown | Cavalier | 8 |
| 10 | (Jamaica) Allan Ottey | Montego Bay United | 8 |
