= Chevone Marsh =

Jamaican footballer (born 1994)

Personal information
- Full name: Chevonne Omille Marsh
- Date of birth: 25 February 1994 (age 32)
- Place of birth: Kingston, Jamaica
- Height: 1.60 m (5 ft 3 in)
- Position: Midfielder

Youth career
- 2009–2012: Cavalier

Senior career*
Years	Team	Apps	(Gls)
2012–2020	Cavalier	176	(37)
2015	→ Ventura County Fusion (loan)	7	(3)
2016	→ Kokkolan Palloveikot (loan)	16	(0)
2021	Chalatenango	10	(0)
2021–2022	Jicaral Sercoba	26	(4)
2022	Santos de Guápiles	6	(0)
2022	→ Cariari Pococí (loan)	1	(2)
2023–2024	Chattanooga Red Wolves	50	(18)
2025	Greenville Triumph	25	(6)
2026	New York Cosmos	3	(1)

International career^{‡}
2012–2013	Jamaica U-20	3	(1)
2017–2020	Jamaica	5	(2)
- * Club domestic league appearances and goals as of 31 October 2025 ‡ National team caps and goals as of 12 July 2026

Chevone Omille Marsh (born 25 February 1994) is a Jamaican footballer who plays wing/attacking midfielder who last played for USL League One club New York Cosmos.

== Early life ==
Marsh grew up in John's Lane, an inner city community off Manninghills Road. He is the third of five brothers and attended Constant Spring Primary and Junior High School. Chevone has been singing and playing the drums since his days in the choir, having first received vocal training from his older sister who always encouraged him to pursue his dream. He passed his GSAT exams for Calabar High School. Although it was a tough neighbourhood, it provided good sports facilities. At 12 he met the Cavalier FC manager who recruited him.

== Career ==
=== Junior career ===
Marsh started his career at Cavalier FC at the under-13 level where he helped them to the quarter-final. He played for Meadhaven United and went in the age of 15 return to Cavalier, who played in the under-15 and under-17 team simultaneously. They won the KSAFA U-15 that year winning the KSAFA U-17 the next year. At Cavalier, he helped them to win the KSAFA U-17 where he was named. MVPof the tournament. In 2012, he played for Calabar High at the Manning Cup level, helping them to reach the quarterfinals. The same year he scored the winning goal for Cavalier F.C. to seal their promotion to the top league.

=== Senior career ===
==== Cavalier ====
Marsh started playing for Cavalier in the Jamaica National Premier League in the 2012–13 season. After making his professional debut with the club at 18, Marsh established himself as one of the more exciting players in Jamaica, and was eventually named captain of Cavalier. In two spells at the club Marsh appeared in 185 matches, and scored 38 goals.

==== loan to Ventura County Fusion ====
In early 2015, Marsh was loaned to American side Ventura County Fusion playing in USL League Two. He made seven appearances for the side scoring three goals.

==== loan to Kokkolan Palloveikot ====
In April 2016 Marsh went on a trial stint in Finland which sparks controversy with the then Jamaica national team coach Winfried "Winnie" Schäfer who wanted marsh for a friendly international with Chile. Marsh opted to go to Finland and sign on loan with Kokkolan Palloveikot in the Finnish Ykkönen league. During his spell in Finland he made 18 appearances and scored two goals.

==== Chalatenango ====
In January 2021, Marsh joined Chalatenango in El Salvador. He made 10 appearances for the Central-American side.

==== A.D.R. Jicaral ====
In July 2021, Marsh moved to Costa Rica and signed with A.D.R. Jicaral. On 1 August 2021, Marsh scored the game-winning goal in the 92nd minute to lift his club to a 3–2 victory over top Costa Rican side Club Sport Herediano. On 21 August 2021, Marsh again scored a late goal for his club, this time scoring in the 93rd minute to salvage a 1–1 draw with Santos de Guápiles. He would end the season appearing in 26 league matches and scoring four goals.

==== Santos de Guápiles ====
In June 2022, Marsh signed for Santos de Guápiles in Costa Rica's Liga FPD. After featuring in only six league matches, Marsh was sent on loan to Segunda División de Costa Rica side Cariari Pococí.

==== Chattanooga Red Wolves ====
Marsh joined USL League One side Chattanooga Red Wolves on 18 January 2023. On 23 June 2023, Marsh scored his first goal with the club, an injury-time equalizer in a 2–2 draw with Charlotte Independence. Marsh continued his great form for Chattanooga, and in August 2023 was named the USL League One Player of the Month, after scoring in four consecutive matches. He ended his first season with the Red Wolves appearing in 30 matches and scoring 12 times.

On 25 May 2024, Marsh scored his first goal of the season in a 4–3 loss to Lexington SC in the USL Cup. In his two seasons at the club, Marsh made 62 appearances and scored 20 goals.

==== Greenville Triumph ====
In January 2025, Marsh signed with Greenville Triumph. On 26 July 2025, Marsh helped Greenville advance in the USL Cup, scoring in a 2–1 victory over FC Naples.On 9 August 2025, Marsh scored a hat-trick in a 5–4 victory over Charlotte Independence, the first of his career. He ended the 2025 season with seven goals in 31 matches.

==== NY Cosmos ====
On 7 July 2026, Marsh signed with New York Cosmos after training with the club for several months. The following day he made his debut for the club, scoring the game-winning goal in a 1–0 victory over FC Naples.

On August 3, Marsh was released from the club due to an unspecified violation of team rules. He appeared in three league matches, one USL Cup match, and two mid-season team friendlies.

== International career ==
Marsh was in Jamaica's national Under-20 training squad for the Under-20 World Cup in Turkey. He represented Jamaica in Under-20 qualifiers in Mexico. Although Jamaica did not qualify, Marsh scored their only goal at the tournament.

Marsh was in the Jamaican squad for WCF qualifiers against Costa Rica for the 2018 World Cup in Russia. Marsh made his senior national team debut on 7 October versus Saudi Arabia in Jeedah.

== Career statistics ==
=== Club ===
As of match played 12 July 2026

Appearances and goals by club, season and competition
Club	Season	League			Cup		League Cup		Other		Total	
Club	Season	Division	Apps	Goals	Apps	Goals	Apps	Goals	Apps	Goals	Apps	Goals
Cavalier	2012–13	National Premier League	22	1	0	0	0	0	0	0	22	1
Cavalier	2013–14	National Premier League	21	3	0	0	0	0	0	0	21	3
Cavalier	2014–15	National Premier League	18	3	0	0	0	0	0	0	18	3
Cavalier	2015–16	National Premier League	29	7	0	0	0	0	0	0	29	7
Cavalier	Total		90	14	0	0	0	0	0	0	90	14
Ventura County Fusion (loan)	USL PDL	2015	7	3	0	0	—		0	0	7	3
Kokkolan Palloveikot (loan)	2016	Ykkönen	5	0	—		—		0	0	5	0
Kokkolan Palloveikot (loan)	2017	Ykkönen	11	0	2	0	0	0	0	0	13	2
Kokkolan Palloveikot (loan)	Total		16	0	0	0	0	0	0	0	18	2
Cavalier	2017–18	National Premier League	29	9	4	0	—		0	0	33	9
Cavalier	2018–19	National Premier League	31	2	5	1	—		0	0	36	3
Cavalier	2019–20	National Premier League	26	12	0	0	—		0	0	26	12
Cavalier	Total		86	23	9	1	0	0	0	0	95	24
Chalatenango	2020-21	Primera División de El Salvador	10	0	0	0	—		0	0	10	0
Jicaral Sercoba	2021–22	2021–22 Liga FPD	26	4	0	0	—		0	0	26	4
Santos de Guápiles	2022–23	2022–23 Liga FPD	6	0	0	0	—		0	0	6	0
Cariari Pococí (loan)	2022–23	Segunda División de Costa Rica	1	2	0	0	—		0	0	1	2
Chattanooga Red Wolves SC	2023	USL League One	29	12	1	0	0	0	0	0	30	12
Chattanooga Red Wolves SC	2024	USL League One	21	6	3	1	8	1	0	0	32	8
Greenville Triumph SC	2025	USL League One	25	6	1	0	5	1	0	0	31	7
New York Cosmos	2026	USL League One	3	1	0	0	1	1	0	0	4	2
Career total			320	71	18	4	14	3	0	0	352	78

=== International goals ===
Scores and results list Jamaica's goal tally first.

No	Date	Venue	Opponent	Score	Result	Competition
1.	26 April 2018	Warner Park Sporting Complex, Basseterre, Saint Kitts and Nevis	Saint Kitts and Nevis	3–0	3–1	Friendly
2.	17 August 2018	Kirani James Athletic Stadium, St. George's, Grenada	Grenada	5–1	5–1	Friendly

== Honours ==
- KSAFA U-15
- KSAFA U-17
- KSAFA Super League
