= 2009–10 National Premier League =

National Premier League
- Season: 2009–10
- Champions: Harbour View F.C.
- Promoted: Reno FC; Benfica
- Relegated: Rivoli United; August Town
- Matches played: 228
- Goals scored: 443 (1.94 per match)

The 2009–10 National Premier League (known as the Digicell Premier League for sponsorship reasons) was contested by 12 teams. The Championship was won by Harbour View F.C. The season began September 6, 2009 and ended on May 16, 2010.

== Format ==
The 12 teams will play 3 rounds (33 games) and then split. The top six teams will play in the Championship Playoff and the bottom six in the Relegation Playoff (5 games). The bottom 2 teams will be relegated to the Super Leagues.

== Standings ==
=== Regular stage ===
Pos	Team	Pld	W	D	L	GF	GA	GD	Pts	Qualification
1	Harbour View	33	19	7	7	44	24	+20	64	Championship Playoff
2	Tivoli Gardens	33	17	12	4	52	22	+30	63	Championship Playoff
3	Waterhouse	33	14	8	11	34	33	+1	50	Championship Playoff
4	Boys' Town	33	11	12	10	27	26	+1	45	Championship Playoff
5	St. George's	33	10	14	9	26	26	0	44	Championship Playoff
6	Village United	33	9	14	10	29	35	−6	41	Championship Playoff
7	Portmore United	33	9	11	13	20	27	−7	38	Relegation Playoff
8	Humble Lions	33	8	13	12	27	33	−6	37	Relegation Playoff
9	Rivoli United	33	8	13	12	31	39	−8	37	Relegation Playoff
10	Arnett Gardens	33	8	12	13	30	37	−7	36	Relegation Playoff
11	Sporting Central Academy	33	7	14	12	26	29	−3	35	Relegation Playoff
12	August Town	33	9	8	16	25	40	−15	35	Relegation Playoff

Updated to match(es) played on 4 April 2010. Source: RSSSF
Rules for classification: 1) points; 2) goal difference; 3) number of goals scored.

=== Championship playoff ===
Pos	Team	Pld	W	D	L	GF	GA	GD	Pts	Qualification
1	Harbour View (C)	38	23	8	7	53	27	+26	77	2011 CFU Club Championship (Note: Neither Harbour View nor Tivoli Gardens took part in the 2011 CFU Club Championship.)
2	Tivoli Gardens	38	18	12	8	58	32	+26	66	2011 CFU Club Championship
3	Waterhouse	38	17	9	12	43	35	+8	60	
4	St. George's	38	12	14	12	32	38	−6	50	
5	Boys' Town	38	12	13	13	33	36	−3	49	
6	Village United	38	11	15	12	35	40	−5	48	

Updated to match(es) played on 16 May 2010. Source: RSSSF
Rules for classification: 1) points; 2) goal difference; 3) number of goals scored.
(C) Champions

=== Relegation playoff ===
Pos	Team	Pld	W	D	L	GF	GA	GD	Pts	Relegation
7	Portmore United	38	11	14	13	24	28	−4	47	
8	Arnett Gardens	38	10	15	13	36	38	−2	45	
9	Sporting Central Academy	38	9	16	13	33	34	−1	43	
10	Humble Lions	38	9	16	13	32	36	−4	43	
11	Rivoli United (R)	38	9	15	14	36	45	−9	42	Relegation to 2010-11 South Central Confederation Super League
12	August Town (R)	38	9	9	20	28	54	−26	36	Relegation to 2010-11 KSAFA Super League

Updated to match(es) played on 16 May 2010. Source: RSSSF
Rules for classification: 1) points; 2) goal difference; 3) number of goals scored.
(R) Relegated
