= Warren Barrett =

Jamaican footballer and manager (born 1970)

Personal information
- Date of birth: 7 September 1970 (age 56)
- Place of birth: Montego Bay, Jamaica
- Height: 1.90 m (6 ft 3 in)
- Position: Goalkeeper

Team information
- Current team: Mount Pleasant F.A. (goalkeeping coach)

Senior career*
Years	Team	Apps	(Gls)
1988–2000	Violet Kickers		
2000	Wadadah		
2001	Violet Kickers		

International career
1990–2000	Jamaica	108	(0)
- * Club domestic league appearances and goals

Warren Barrett (born 7 September 1970) is a Jamaican retired football goalkeeper and currently goalkeeping coach. Nicknamed 'Boopie', he played mostly for Violet Kickers F.C., but also played one season for Wadadah F.C. in the 2000/2001 season.

== Early life and education ==
Barrett was born on 7 September 1970, to parents St. Hilman Barrett and Elaine Barrett. He grew up in the rural district of Chatham, St. James. Barrett attended Cornwall College, Jamaica where he played for the 1987 daCosta Cup team. He later became a member of the Violet Kickers F.C. team.

== International career ==
Barrett made his debut for the Jamaica national football team in 1990 against Barbados. He captained his nation at the 1998 FIFA World Cup. According to the Jamaica Football Federation, Barrett earned 127 caps for his country, but this figure has not been officially acknowledged by FIFA because the JFF includes all matches, even against club sides, youth or olympic teams. He played his final FIFA international in 2000 against Honduras in the 2000 CONCACAF Gold Cup; he came on as a substitute for midfielder Winston Griffiths as Aaron Lawrence was sent off. He is married with three children, Ashley, Warren Jr. and Moya. Warren Barrett played a big role in 1998 Qualification,'Road To France' without conceding a goal on home soil.

== Coaching ==
Barrett was selected as a national goalkeeping coach for Jamaica in 2008. On 26 July 2010, Barrett was suspended from all coaching duties by the JFF for an altercation with a match official at Jarrett Park. He was the goalkeeping coach of the Jamaican squad that finished as runners-up in the 2015 CONCACAF Gold Cup.

== See also ==
- List of men's footballers with 100 or more international caps
- Association football in Jamaica
