= O'Brian Woodbine =

Jamaican footballer (born 1988)

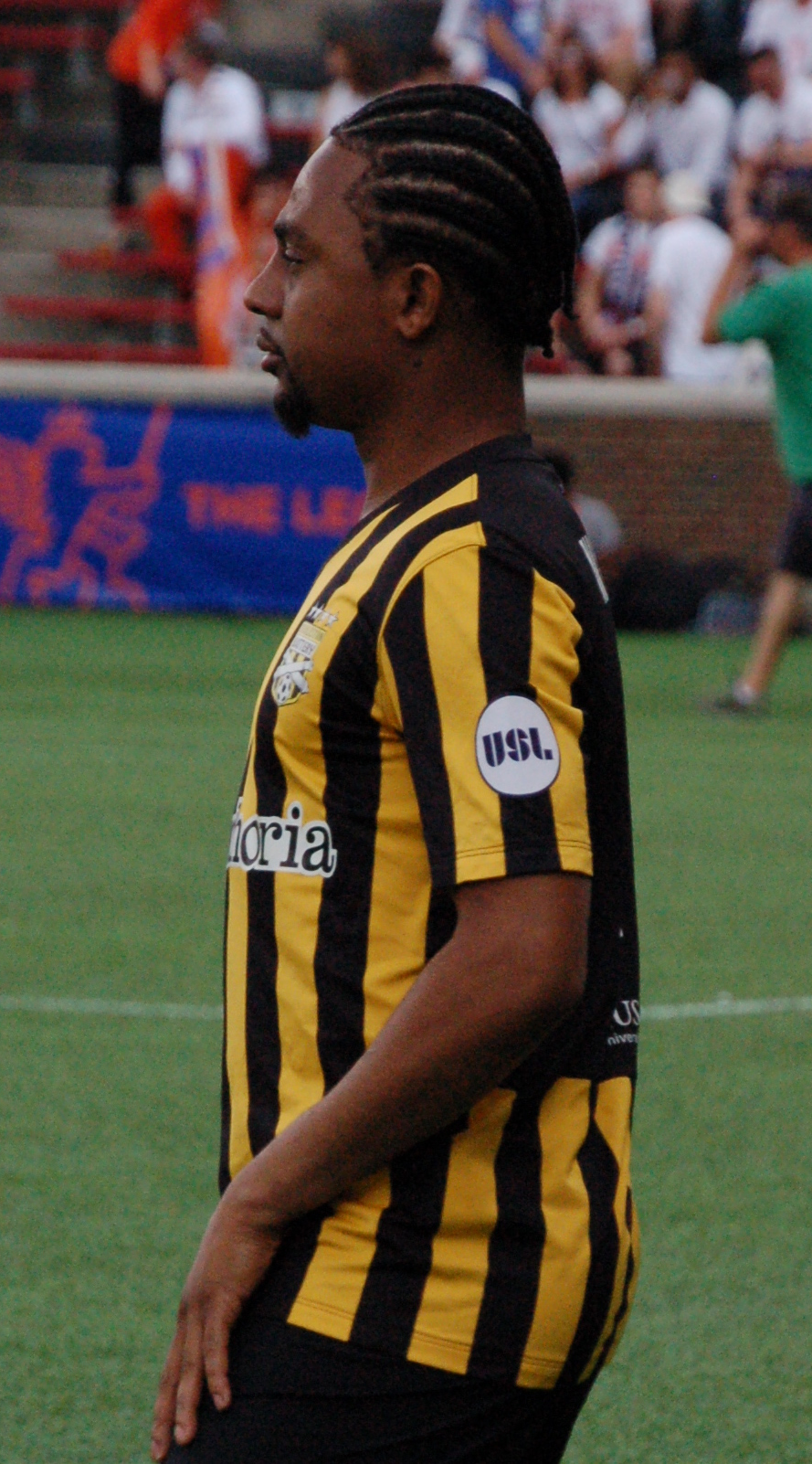
- Woodbine playing for Charleston Battery in 2016

Personal information
- Full name: O'Brian Woodbine
- Date of birth: 11 January 1988 (age 38)
- Place of birth: Westmoreland Parish, Jamaica
- Height: 6 ft 0 in (1.83 m)
- Position: Defender

Senior career*
Years	Team	Apps	(Gls)
2006–2010	Reno	70	(14)
2009–2010	→ Charleston Battery (loan)	31	(1)
2011–2012	VPS	46	(2)
2011	→ HJK (loan)	8	(0)
2013–2014	New England Revolution	0	(0)
2014	Ottawa Fury	5	(0)
2015–2019	Charleston Battery	112	(4)

International career
2005	Jamaica U17	8	(0)
2006–2007	Jamaica U20	15	(0)
2007	Jamaica U23	2	(0)
2008–2013	Jamaica	16	(0)
- * Club domestic league appearances and goals as of 21 October 2019

O'Brian Woodbine (born 11 January 1988) is a Jamaican footballer who played as a defender.

== Career ==
=== Club ===
==== Jamaica ====
Woodbine attended and played soccer at George's Plain Primary School and Frome Technical High School in his native Jamaica, where he won the Westmoreland primary school league and DaCosta Cup. He started his club career at Reno of the Jamaica National Premier League where, under the tutelage of former Jamaica national team player and coach, Wendell Downswell, he played for under-21 and senior teams.

At the conclusion of the USL-1 season, Woodbine returned to Jamaica to play for Reno in the 2009–2010 Western Confederation Super League, under coach Wendell Downswell. Woodbine has returned to Charleston Battery for the 2010 USL-2 season. After winning the USL2 title with Charleston, Woodbine rejoin Reno F.C. for the 2010–2011 Jamaica National Premier League season. Woodbine is highly regarded as one of the top free-kick specialist in the Jamaica National Premier League.

==== United States ====
After a successful trial in early 2009, Woodbine joined the USL First Division side Charleston Battery for the 2009 season on 18 March 2009. Woodbine featured in 16 matches for the Battery in 2009.

==== Finland ====
After a successful trial in February 2011, Woodbine joined the Finnish Veikkausliiga side Vaasan Palloseura for one plus one-year contract on 25 February 2011. In August 2011, Woodbine went on loan to HJK Helsinki. Woodbine went 90 minutes in his debut for HJK in September 2011. After spending three months on loan to HJK, Woodbine's purchase option was declined. VPS picked up Woodbine option for the 2012 season.

In 2013, Woodbine returned to Reno in the Jamaica Western Super League.

==== New England Revolution ====
Woodbine joined MLS side New England Revolution in September 2013. He was released in June 2014.

==== Ottawa Fury ====
On 16 September 2014, Woodbine signed with NASL club Ottawa Fury. Woodbine was released by Ottawa in February 2015.

==== Charleston Battery ====
Woodbine signed with former club Charleston Battery in March 2015.

=== International ===
Woodbine is a member of the Jamaica national football team. He was a standout player on the U17, U20, U23 national teams since 2005. He made his senior national team debut for the Reggae Boyz on 26 March 2008, in a friendly against Trinidad and Tobago, and played in Jamaica's qualifying games for the 2010 FIFA World Cup against the Bahamas, Canada and Honduras. Woodbine also played in two(2) matches for Jamaica during 2008 DigiceRenol Cup tournament. After a strong performance in the first round of the DPL season, Woodbine earned a recalled to the senior national team and was named to the 2010 Digicel Cup squad for Jamaica.

== Honours ==
=== Jamaica ===
- Caribbean Cup:
  - Winner (2): 2008, 2010

=== Reno ===
- Western Confederation Super League:
  - Winner (1): 2010

=== Charleston Battery ===
- USL Second Division
  - Champions (1): 2010
  - Regular Season Champions (1): 2010

=== HJK ===
- Finnish Championship:
  - Winners (1): 2011
