= 2026–27 Jamaica Premier League =

Jamaican football league

Jamaica Premier League
- Season: 2026–27
- Dates: September 2026 – May 2027
- Champions: TBD
- Relegated: TBD
- Matches: 247
- All statistics correct as of 12 March 2026.

The 2026–27 Jamaica Premier League is the 53st season of the top-tier football league in Jamaica. The season was scheduled with three rounds of preliminary games, returning to its pre-COVID structure. The return to three rounds increased the number of games each team played from 26 to 39 regular-season matches, followed by the playoffs. The JPL is administered by PFJL guided by Owen Hill.

== Teams ==
Fourteen teams are competing in the league — the top twelve teams from the previous season and two promoted teams from the second division.

- Arnett Gardens.
- Tivoli Gardens
- Montego Bay Utd
- Mount Pleasant
- Treasure Beach
- Cavalier
- Tru Juice
- Humble Lion
- Dunbeholden
- Racing Utd
- Chapelton Maroons
- Waterhouse
- Portmore Utd
- Molynes Utd

=== Stadiums and locations ===
Fourteen teams are competing in the league — the top twelve teams from the previous season and two promoted teams from the second division.

Location of teams in the 2026–27 Jamaica Premier League

Pos.	Relegated from 2025-26 Premier League
13th	Spanish Town Police
14th	Harbour View F.C.

Pos.	Promoted from 2025-26 JFF Championship
Winners	Humble Lions F.C.
Runner-up	Tru-Juice F.C.

=== Stadiums and locations ===
Team	Location	Stadium	Stadium Capacity
Arnett Gardens	Kingston	Anthony Spaulding Sports Complex	6,000
Cavalier	Kingston	Stadium East	3,000
Chapelton Maroons	Chapelton	Draxhall Sports Complex	6,000
Dunbeholden	Portmore	Dunbeholden Sports Complex	1,500
Humble Lions F.C.	Sligoville	TBA	3,500
Molynes United	Kingston	Jasceria Park Recreational Center	1,500
Montego Bay United	Montego Bay	Catherine Hall Sports Complex	7,000
Mount Pleasant	Runaway Bay	Draxhall Sports Complex	3,500
Portmore United	Portmore	Ferdie Neita Sports Complex	3,000
Racing United	Portmore	Ferdie Neita Sports Complex	3,000
Treasure Beach F.C.	Treasure Beach	STEHS	1,200
Tivoli Gardens	Kingston	Edward Seaga Sports Complex	5,000
Tru-Juice F.C.	Clarendon	Tru-Juice Sports Complex	3,000
Waterhouse	Kingston	Waterhouse Mini Stadium	5,000

Source: Jamaica Premier League

== Regular season ==
=== League table ===
Pos	Team	Pld	W	D	L	GF	GA	GD	Pts	Qualification or relegation
1	Montego Bay United	6	4	2	0	9	3	+6	14	Advance to Playoffs (Semifinals)
2	Racing United	6	4	1	1	14	6	+8	13	Advance to Playoffs (Semifinals)
3	Waterhouse	6	3	3	0	15	2	+13	12	Advance to Playoffs (Quarterfinals)
4	Tivoli Gardens	6	3	2	1	13	6	+7	11	Advance to Playoffs (Quarterfinals)
5	Tru-Juice F.C.	6	3	2	1	10	0	+10	11	Advance to Playoffs (Quarterfinals)
6	Chapelton Maroons	6	2	2	2	4	10	−6	8	Advance to Playoffs (Quarterfinals)
7	Cavalier	5	2	1	2	7	8	−1	7	
8	Molynes United	6	2	0	4	5	12	−7	6	
9	Portmore United	3	1	2	0	6	3	+3	5	
10	Arnett Gardens	5	1	2	2	10	9	+1	5	
11	Mount Pleasant	4	1	1	2	3	6	−3	4	
12	Dunbeholden	6	1	0	5	2	11	−9	3	
13	Treasure Beach F.C.	5	0	2	3	4	8	−4	2	Relegation to JFF Championship
14	Humble Lions	6	0	2	4	2	17	−15	2	Relegation to JFF Championship

Source: JPL
