= Navion Boyd =

Jamaican footballer (born 1986)

Personal information
- Full name: Navion Boyd
- Date of birth: 10 October 1986 (age 40)
- Place of birth: Kingston, Jamaica
- Height: 5 ft 8 in (1.73 m)
- Position: Winger

Senior career*
Years	Team	Apps	(Gls)
2005–2015	Tivoli Gardens	73	(25)
2012	→ Charleston Battery (loan)	17	(2)
2015	→ Charleston Battery (loan)	15	(1)

International career
2007	Jamaica U23	2	(0)
2009–2012	Jamaica	17	(1)
- * Club domestic league appearances and goals

Navion Boyd (born 10 October 1986) is a Jamaican professional footballer who played as a striker for Charleston Battery in the USL Professional Division and Tivoli Gardens in the Jamaica National Premier League.

== Career ==
=== Club ===
==== Tivoli Gardens ====
Boyd became member of his club's senior team, after being promoted from the U21 team. After starting the 2010–2011 season with outstanding form, Boyd suffered a shoulder injury which kept him out of action for eight weeks. He made his return to action on 15 December 2010. Boyd finished the 2010–2011 DPL season with 11 goals.

==== Charleston Battery ====
Boyd spent the 2012 season on loan to American club Charleston Battery along with Tivoli Gardens teammate Dane Kelly.

Boyd returned to the Battery for the 2015 season. On 17 July, Boyd scored Charleston's only goal in a 2–1 exhibition loss against West Bromwich Albion of the English Premier League.

== International ==
Since 2008, Boyd is a member of the Jamaica national football team, The Reggae Boyz. Navion Boyd was called up to the senior national team on several occasions in 2009–2010 and featured some friendly matches, however he was unable to participate in the 2010 Caribbean Championship due to injury.

== Honours ==
=== Club ===
Tivoli Gardens F.C.

- Jamaica National Premier League: 2

2008–2009, 2010–2011

Charleston Battery

- USL Pro
  - Champions (1): 2012

=== Individual ===
- Jamaica National Premier League MVP: 1

2009–2010

- Tivoli Gardens MVP: 1

2009–2010
