= Lacon Brissett =

Jamaican footballer (born 1982)

Personal information
- Date of birth: 21 May 1982 (age 44)
- Position: Midfielder

Senior career*
Years	Team	Apps	(Gls)
2002–2003	Wadadah		
2003–2004	Seba United		
2004–2005	Arnett Gardens		
2005–2009	Village United		
2009–2011	Benfica		
2011–2012	Village United		
2012–2013	Rivoli United		
2013–2014	Montego Bay United		

International career
2003	Jamaica	3	(0)
- * Club domestic league appearances and goals

Lacon Brissett (born 21 May 1982) is a retired Jamaican football midfielder.
