= Jamaica Premier League =

Jamaican association football league

- Organising body: JFF
- Founded: 1973; 53 years ago
- Country: Jamaica
- Confederation: CONCACAF
- Number of clubs: 14 (since 2022–23) (Note: 12 teams between 2001–2022.)
- Level on pyramid: 1
- Relegation to: JFF Championship
- Domestic cup: JFF Champions Cup
- International cup(s): Continental; CONCACAF Champions Cup; Regional; CONCACAF Caribbean Cup; CFU Caribbean Club Shield
- Current champions: Portmore United (8th title) (2025–26)
- Most championships: Portmore United (8 titles)
- Top scorer: Kevin Lamey (115 goals)
- Broadcasters: Domestic; Television Jamaica; TVJ Sports Network; International; 1LuvTV.com; Live Streaming; 1LuvTV.com; JPL TV (YouTube)
- Sponsor: Wray & Nephew
- Website: Jamaica Premier League
- Current: 2026–27 Jamaica Premier League

The Jamaica Premier League (formerly the National Premier League), commonly abbreviated as JPL and officially known as the Wray and Nephew Jamaica Premier League for sponsorship reasons, is sanctioned by the Jamaican Football Federation as the top division for men's association football in Jamaica. Contested between 14 clubs, it operates on a system of promotion and relegation with the JFF Championship. Most games are played on Sunday afternoons and Monday evenings (Monday Night Football).

== History ==
The Jamaica Premier League was formed in 1973 to serve as the top tier of Jamaican professional club football. The league's inaugural season kicked off on September 22, 1973 as the Craven A National Club League Championships, and finished with Santos as the first title winners. 14 clubs have been crowned champions of Jamaica. Portmore United is the most successful team with 7 top flight titles.

The 2019–20 season was ruled null and void on March 12, 2020 due to COVID-19 pandemic. Later in 2020, Professional Football Jamaica Limited (PFJL) began managing the league with its focus being the commercialization and marketing of professional football in the country.

In May 2021, the Jamaican Football Federation announced that the league would resume, playing a shortened season between June and September, competed by the 12 teams from the previous season. In June 2021, UWI FC announced it would withdraw ahead of the 2021 season due to the modified schedule conflicting with other player commitments; leaving 11 teams in the competition.

Montego Bay United was promoted to the league at the start of the 2022 season, restoring the league to 12 teams. Also in 2022, the league entered an agreement with Admiral Sportswear to supply kits to all teams in the league.

The league was expanded to 14 teams for the 2022–23 season.

== Competition format ==
The Jamaica Premier League's regular season typically runs from late August to May the following year. The competition is divided into two stages; the single table regular season and the playoffs.

The regular season is contested in a round robin format with three rounds for a total of 39 matches for each team. The top six clubs contend for the championship in the playoffs, the first and second place regular season finishers advance directly to the semifinals and the third to sixth place teams advance to the quarterfinals.

The quarterfinals and semifinals are played in a two legged, home and away, format with the winner decided on aggregate. The finals and third place matches are contested as a single leg match.

The bottom two regular season finishers are relegated and replaced the next season by the top two finishers of the JFF Championship.

== Clubs ==
=== 2024–25 clubs ===
Club	2023–24 Regular Season (Playoffs)	City	Stadium
Arnett Gardens	5th (3rd place)	Kingston	Anthony Spaulding Sports Complex
Cavalier	2nd (Champions)	Kingston	Stadium East Field
Chapelton Maroons	Champions (JFF Championship)	Chapelton	Anthony Spaulding Sports Complex
Dunbeholden	8th	Portmore	Dunbeholden Sports Complex
Harbour View	12th	Kingston	Harbour View Football Club Stadium
Humble Lions	10th	May Pen	Effortville Community Centre
Molynes United	11th	Kingston	Jasceria Park Recreational Center
Montego Bay United	7th	Montego Bay	Wespow Park
Mount Pleasant	1st (Runners-up)	Runaway Bay	Draxhall Sports Complex
Portmore United	4th	Portmore	Ferdi Neita Sports Complex
Racing United	Runners-up (JFF Championship)	Portmore	Ferdi Neita Sports Complex
Tivoli Gardens	3rd	Kingston	Edward Seaga Sports Complex
Vere United	9th	Hayes	Wembley Centre of Excellence
Waterhouse	6th	Kingston	Waterhouse Mini Stadium

Title holders Promoted

== All-time table ==
The following is the historical table of the Jamaica Premier League from the professional era in the 2001–02 season up to the concluded 2023–24 season. Table does not include matches played in the playoff stages.

Pos	Teams	Pld	W	D	L	GF	GA	GD	Pts
1	Portmore United	695	322	215	158	870	539	+331	1187
2	Harbour View	730	320	217	193	951	691	+285	1185
3	Waterhouse	730	328	215	207	964	677	+287	1175
4	Tivoli Gardens	730	322	190	218	1009	749	+260	1160
5	Arnett Gardens	729	299	213	217	970	786	+184	1116
6	Montego Bay United	515	169	150	196	582	629	-47	655
7	Humble Lion	462	160	148	164	488	452	+36	628
8	Boys' Town	459	159	139	161	494	537	-43	616
9	FC Reno	506	123	169	214	500	653	-153	538
10	Village United	381	127	118	136	421	427	-6	499
11	Cavalier	316	127	90	105	371	310	+61	465
12	Rivoli United	305	85	92	128	305	366	-61	338
13	Sporting Central Academy	294	79	96	119	288	349	-61	331
14	Mount Pleasant	146	92	42	38	255	141	+114	318
15	UWI FC	161	58	46	57	180	188	-8	220
16	St. George's SC	152	47	42	63	134	168	-34	183
17	Dunbeholden	146	47	30	43	144	143	+1	171
18	Constant Spring	158	35	57	66	151	224	-73	165
19	August Town	142	35	40	67	125	198	-73	145
20	Wadadah	158	33	41	84	167	323	-156	140
21	Vere United	146	30	41	75	111	190	-79	131
22	Molynes United	113	26	23	61	127	210	-83	104
23	Highgate United	76	21	21	34	69	93	-24	84
24	Invaders United	65	8	20	37	52	134	-82	44
25	Lime Hall (Benfica)	64	11	11	42	48	146	-98	44
26	Meadhaven United	38	9	12	17	36	53	-17	39
27	Maverley Hughenden	33	7	14	12	26	34	-8	35
28	Savannah SC	38	6	8	24	24	74	-50	26
29	Barbican	33	5	10	18	26	61	-35	25
30	Sandals South Coast	33	5	7	21	25	60	-35	22
31	Arlington	33	5	7	21	23	65	-42	22
32	Naggo Head	33	5	6	22	26	65	-39	21
33	Bull Bay	32	4	9	19	19	57	-38	19
34	Star Cosmos	32	3	7	22	22	66	-44	16
36	Faulkland	26	1	10	15	23	55	-32	13
35	Duhaney Park	28	2	3	23	13	59	-46	9
37	Chapelton Maroons	26	3	6	17	14	62	-48	9
38	Treasure Beach	26	3	4	19	17	52	-35	7

Currently in Jamaica Premier League
Currently in lower divisions

== Champions ==
=== By season ===
Since the inaugural 1973–74 season, 14 teams have claimed the Jamaica Premier League title. As of 2024–25 season, Cavalier successfully defended their title, making this their fourth league title overall.

Finalists by Season
Season	Winners	Result	Runners-up	Third place	Result	Fourth place
1973–74	Santos	1–0	Boys' Town			
1974–75	Santos	3–2	Boys' Town			
1975–76	Santos		Cavalier			
1976–77	Santos	1–0	Cavalier			
1977–78	Arnett Gardens		Harbour View			
1978–79	Abandoned					
1979–80	Santos		Cavalier			
1980–81	Cavalier		Thunderbolts			
1981–82	No Competition					
1982–83	Tivoli Gardens		Santos			
1983–84	Boys' Town	2–1 (agg)	Tivoli Gardens			
1984–85	Jamaica Defence Force	2–1 (agg)	Seba United			
1985–86	Boys' Town		Harbour View			
1986–87	Seba United		Boys' Town			
1987–88	Wadadah		FC Reno			
1988–89	Boys' Town		Seba United			
1989–90	FC Reno		Black Lions			
1990–91	FC Reno		Arnett Gardens			
1991–92	Wadadah		FC Reno			
1992–93	Hazard United		Arnett Gardens			
1993–94	Violet Kickers		Seba United			
1994–95	FC Reno	3–1 (agg)	Constant Spring			
1995–96	Violet Kickers		FC Reno			
1996–97	Seba United	4–3 (agg)	Arnett Gardens			
1997–98	Waterhouse	2–1 (agg)	Seba United			
1998–99	Tivoli Gardens	3–1 (agg)	Harbour View			
1999–00	Harbour View	2–1 (agg)	Waterhouse			
2000–01	Arnett Gardens	4–2 (agg)	Waterhouse			
2001–02	Arnett Gardens	3–2 (agg)	Hazard United			
2002–03	Hazard United	4–3 (agg)	Arnett Gardens			
2003–04	Tivoli Gardens	5–3 (agg)	Harbour View			
2004–05	Portmore United	2–1 (agg)	Tivoli Gardens			
2005–06	Waterhouse		Harbour View	Tivoli Gardens		Portmore United
2006–07	Harbour View		Portmore United	FC Reno		Waterhouse
2007–08	Portmore United		Tivoli Gardens	Boys' Town		Harbour View
2008–09	Tivoli Gardens		Portmore United	Harbour View		Boys' Town
2009–10	Harbour View		Tivoli Gardens	Waterhouse		St. George's S.C.
2010–11	Tivoli Gardens		Boys' Town	Harbour View		Waterhouse
2011–12	Portmore United		Boys' Town	Waterhouse		Humble Lions
2012–13	Harbour View		Waterhouse	Portmore United		Arnett Gardens
2013–14	Montego Bay United	5–2	Waterhouse			
2014–15	Arnett Gardens	2–0	Montego Bay United			
2015–16	Montego Bay United	2–1	Portmore United			
2016–17	Arnett Gardens	2–1	Portmore United			
2017–18	Portmore United	0–0 (4–3 pen.)	Waterhouse			
2018–19	Portmore United	1–0	Waterhouse	Cavalier	1–0	Mount Pleasant
2019–20	Abandoned due to COVID-19 pandemic					
2021	Cavalier	1–1 (5–4 pen.)	Waterhouse	Tivoli Gardens	1–1 (4–3 pen.)	Mount Pleasant
2022	Harbour View	1–1 (6–5 pen.)	Dunbeholden	Cavalier	4–1	Waterhouse
2022–23	Mount Pleasant	2–1	Cavalier	Arnett Gardens	1–0 (aet)	Harbour View
2023–24	Cavalier	1–1 (4–3 pen.)	Mount Pleasant	Arnett Gardens	5–1	Waterhouse
2024–25	Cavalier	0–0 (6–5 pen.)	Mount Pleasant	Arnett Gardens	4–2	Montego Bay United
2025–26	Portmore United	2–2 (5–3 pen.)	Cavalier	Mount Pleasant	3–2	Montego Bay United

Note: No championship was awarded for the 1978–79, 1981–82, and 2019–20 seasons.
Source: RSSSF

=== By club ===
Portmore United is the league’s most successful club having won 7 league titles and finishing runners-up 5 times.

Champions by Club
Club	Winners	Championship Seasons	Runners-up	Runners-up Season
Portmore United (*)	8	1992–93, 2002–03, 2004–05, 2007–08, 2011–12, 2017–18, 2018–19, 2025–26	5	2001–02, 2006–07, 2008–09, 2015–16, 2016–17
Harbour View	5	1999–00, 2006–07, 2009–10, 2012–13, 2022	5	1977–78, 1985–86, 1998–99, 2003–04, 2005–06
Tivoli Gardens	5	1982–83, 1998–99, 2003–04, 2008–09, 2010–11	4	1983–84, 2004–05, 2007–08, 2009–10
Arnett Gardens	5	1977–78, 2000–01, 2001–02, 2014–15, 2016–17	4	1990–91,1992–93, 1996–97, 2002–03
Santos	5	1973–74, 1974–75, 1975–76, 1976–77, 1979–80	1	1982–83
Montego Bay United (**)	4	1986–87, 1996–97, 2013–14, 2015–16	5	1984–85, 1988–89, 1993–94, 1997–98, 2014–15
Cavalier	4	1980–81, 2021, 2023–24, 2024–25	5	1975–76, 1976–77, 1979–80, 2022–23, 2025–26
Boys' Town	3	1983–84, 1985–86, 1988–89	5	1973–74, 1975–76, 1986–87, 2010–11, 2011–12
FC Reno	3	1989–90, 1990–91, 1994–95	3	1987–88, 1991–92, 1995–96
Waterhouse	2	1997–98, 2005–06	7	1999–00, 2000–01, 2012–13, 2013–14, 2017–18, 2018–19, 2021
Wadadah	2	1987–88, 1991–92	—	
Violet Kickers	2	1993–94, 1995–96	—	
Mount Pleasant	1	2022–23	2	2023–24, 2024–25
Jamaica Defence Force	1	1984–85	—	
Thunderbolts	—		1	1980–81
Black Lions	—		1	1989–90
Constant Spring	—		1	1994–95
Dunbeholden	—		1	2022

Notes
(*) Includes titles won as Hazard United.

(**) Includes titles won as Seba United.

Record Number of Titles

Source: RSSSF

=== By parish ===
Kingston and St. Andrew are the most successful parishes with 30 top flight titles won by 7 clubs from Kingston’s metropolitan area. No club from rural St. Andrew has won the league.

St. James is the next best parish with 8 league titles won by 3 clubs. Two of their title winners, Violet Kickers and Wadadah, have since fell from grace and compete in the lower divisions.

Hazard United won 2 league titles while based in Clarendon before the club relocated to St. Catherine and rebranded as Portmore United.

No club from the parishes of Hanover, Manchester, Portland, St. Elizabeth, St. Mary, St. Thomas nor Trelawny have won the league.

Titles by Parish
Parish	Titles	Clubs
Kingston & Saint Andrew	30	Arnett Gardens (5); Harbour View (5); Santos (5); Tivoli Gardens (5); Cavalier (4); Boys' Town (3); Waterhouse (2); Jamaica Defence Force (1)
Saint James	8	Montego Bay United (4); Violet Kickers (2); Wadadah (2)
Saint Catherine	8	Portmore United (8)
Westmoreland	3	FC Reno (3)
Clarendon	2	Hazard United (2)
Saint Ann	1	Mount Pleasant (1)

== Statistics ==
=== Top scorers ===
Top Scorer by Season
Year	Player	Team	Goals
2002–03	(Jamaica) Roen Nelson	Hazard United	19
2003–04	(Jamaica) Fabian Taylor	Harbour View	19
2004–05	(Jamaica) Christopher Nicholas	Tivoli Gardens	25
2005–06	(Jamaica) Kevin Lamey	Waterhouse	22
2006–07	(Jamaica) Irvino English	Waterhouse	18
2007–08	(Jamaica) Roen Nelson	Portmore United	16
2008–09	(Jamaica) Devon Hodges	Rivoli United	24
2009–10	(Jamaica) Devon Hodges	Rivoli United	18
2010–11	(Jamaica) Kirk Ramsey	Arnett Gardens	17
2011–12	(Jamaica) Jermaine "Tuffy" Anderson	Waterhouse	14
2012–13	(Jamaica) Jermaine "Tuffy" Anderson	Waterhouse	21
2013–14	(Jamaica) Brian Brown	Harbour View	19
2014–15	(Jamaica) Craig Foster	Reno	20
2015–16	(Jamaica) Owayne Omar Gordon	Montego Bay United	19
2016–17	(Jamaica) Jermaine Johnson	Tivoli Gardens	16
2017–18	(Jamaica) Craig Foster	Humble Lions	17
2018–19	(Jamaica) Colorado Murray	Tivoli Gardens	13
2019–20	(Jamaica) Kemar Beckford	Mount Pleasant	14
2021	(Jamaica) Oquassa Chong, Jourdaine Flectcher and Shaqueil Bradford	Harbour View, Mount Pleasant, Waterhouse	6
2022	(Jamaica) Atapharoy Bygrave, Daniel Green	Dunbeholden, Mount Pleasant	13
2022–23	(Jamaica) Collin Anderson	Cavalier	20
2023–24	(Jamaica) Javane Bryan	Waterhouse	17
2024–25	(Jamaica) Warner Brown	Arnett Gardens	22
2025–26	(Jamaica) Raheem Edwards	Mount Pleasant	23

Record Goals Scored in a Single Season

=== All-time goalscorers ===
Rank	Country	Scored	Goals	Years
1	(Jamaica)	Kevin Lamey	115	1998–2016
2	(Jamaica)	Devon Hodges	106	2002–2020

Source: JPL Statistics

=== Hat-tricks ===
List of hat-tricks scorers
Rank	Country	Player	Hat-tricks
1	(Jamaica)	Christopher Nicholas	4
2	(Jamaica)	Roen Nelson	3
2	(Jamaica)	Kwame Richardson	3
4	(Jamaica)	Collin Anderson	2
4	(Jamaica)	Kevin Lamey	2
4	(Jamaica)	Trivante Stewart	2
4	(Jamaica)	Justin Dunn	2
4	(Jamaica)	Fabian Reid	2
9	(Jamaica)	Jermaine Anderson	1
9	(Jamaica)	Patrick Beech	1
9	(Jamaica)	Navion Boyd	1
9	(Jamaica)	Lacon Brissett	1
9	(Jamaica)	Fabian Davis	1
9	(Jamaica)	Nigel Ellis	1
9	(Jamaica)	Irvino English	1
9	(Jamaica)	Oneke Ford	1
9	(Jamaica)	Devon Hodges	1
9	(Jamaica)	Jermaine Hue	1
9	(Jamaica)	Lenworth Hyde	1
9	(Jamaica)	Kevin King	1
9	(Jamaica)	Oneill McDonald	1
9	(Jamaica)	Gary McIntosh	1
9	(Jamaica)	Kemar Mills	1
9	(Jamaica)	Derrick Planter	1
9	(Jamaica)	Ricardo Scott	1
9	(Jamaica)	Leon Strickland	1
9	(Jamaica)	Fabian Taylor	1
9	(Jamaica)	Warren Ukah	1
9	(Jamaica)	Denzil Watson	1
9	(Jamaica)	Kevin Wilson	1
9	(Jamaica)	Javane Bryan	1
9	(Jamaica)	Nicholas Nelson	1
9	(Jamaica)	Kemar Beckford	1
9	(Jamaica)	Andre Fletcher	1
9	(Jamaica)	Jason Wright	1
9	(Jamaica)	Cleo Clark	1
9	(Jamaica)	Rojay Smith	1

== Records ==
=== Players ===
Most goals by a player in a single season

- 25 goals
  - Christopher Nicholas (2004–05)

Most goals by a player in a single game

- 10 goals
  - Devon Hodges (Rivoli United) 15–0 against Invaders United, 29 May 2005.

Source: JPL Statistics

=== Clubs ===
Longest winning run

- 12 consecutive wins
  - Mount Pleasant (2024–25)

== Regional competitions ==
The top two finishers in a given season qualify for the CONCACAF Caribbean Cup, the top tier regional club tournament held each fall. The third place team qualify for the CFU Caribbean Club Shield, the second tier regional club tournament held each summer. A top-three finish in the CONCACAF Caribbean Cup is the only route for Jamaican teams to enter the CONCACAF Champions Cup.

The league has produced two Caribbean Club Champions, each with two titles; Portmore United (2005, 2019) and Harbour View (2004, 2007). The Caribbean Club Championship was replaced with the CONCACAF Caribbean Cup in 2023 as a part of CONCACAF's new club football ecosystem. Cavalier (2024) became the first Jamaican club to be victorious in the newly rebranded competition by winning the second edition.

By virtue of winning the 2024 CONCACAF Caribbean Cup, Cavalier (2025) received a bye to the CONCACAF Champions Cup round of 16 and became the first team from the league to feature past the first round. The league was more successful in the discontinued CONCACAF League competition with both Portmore United (2018) and Waterhouse (2019) making it to the quarterfinals.

Regional Competitions Finalists
Competition	Year	Club	Position
Caribbean Club Championship (1997–2022)	1997	Seba United	Runners-up
Caribbean Club Championship (1997–2022)	2004	Harbour View	Champions
Caribbean Club Championship (1997–2022)	2004	Tivoli Gardens	Runners-up
Caribbean Club Championship (1997–2022)	2005	Portmore United	Champions
Caribbean Club Championship (1997–2022)	2007	Harbour View	Champions
Caribbean Club Championship (1997–2022)	2015	Montego Bay United	3rd Place
Caribbean Club Championship (1997–2022)	2016	Arnett Gardens	4th Place
Caribbean Club Championship (1997–2022)	2017	Portmore United	3rd Place
Caribbean Club Championship (1997–2022)	2018	Arnett Gardens	Runners-up
Caribbean Club Championship (1997–2022)	2018	Portmore United	3rd Place
Caribbean Club Championship (1997–2022)	2019	Portmore United	Champions
Caribbean Club Championship (1997–2022)	2019	Waterhouse	Runners-up
Caribbean Club Championship (1997–2022)	2022	Waterhouse	4th Place
CONCACAF Caribbean Cup	2023	Cavalier	Runners-up
CONCACAF Caribbean Cup	2023	Harbour View	4th Place
CFU Caribbean Club Shield	2024	Arnett Gardens	Champions
CONCACAF Caribbean Cup	2024	Cavalier	Champions
CONCACAF Caribbean Cup	2025	Mount Pleasant	Champions
CFU Caribbean Club Shield	2026	Mount Pleasant	Champions

== Sponsorship ==
During the 1970s to 1990s, the league received sponsorship from Craven A, a subsidiary of Carreras Tobacco Company, throughout its initial two decades. However, in 2002, the pressure from various lobbyists, notably the American Cancer Society, led to the termination of the cigarette company’s sponsorship of both the premier league and local horse racing, marking the end of direct associations between tobacco companies and sporting events.

Wray and Nephew assumed sponsorship of the league in 2002 and subsequently extended the contract until 2012. However, their arrangement abruptly concluded in 2007 when Wray and Nephew released the Jamaica Football Federation from the contract without penalties. Subsequently, the league entered into an agreement with investment company Cash Plus in 2007, despite uncertainties arising in early 2008 about Cash Plus’s commitment. In April 2008, the Premier League Clubs Association (PLCA) ceased their association with Cash Plus Limited as league sponsors and initiated plans for legal action against the investment firm.

Digicel signed a three-year sponsorship deal with the league that remained active until 2011.

Red Stripe assumed the title sponsorship of the league starting from the 2011-12 season, a contract that concluded after the league was abandoned in 2020 due to the COVID-19 pandemic.

Digicel commenced a second three-year sponsorship spell from 2020 to 2023.

After a 16-year hiatus, Wray and Nephew returned as title sponsors in 2023.

Title Sponsors by the Years
Period	Sponsor	Brand
1973–1976	Craven A	Craven A National Club League Championships
1976–1997	Craven A	Craven A National League
1997–2002	Craven A	Craven A National Premier League
2002–2007	Wray & Nephew	Wray & Nephew National Premier League
2007–2008	Cash Plus	Cash Plus National Premier League
2008–2011	Digicel	Digicel Premier League
2011–2020	Red Stripe	Red Stripe Premier League
2020–2023	Digicel	The Jamaica Premier League – powered by Digicel
2023–	Wray & Nephew	Wray & Nephew Jamaica Premier League
