= Romeo Parkes =

Jamaican footballer (born 1990)

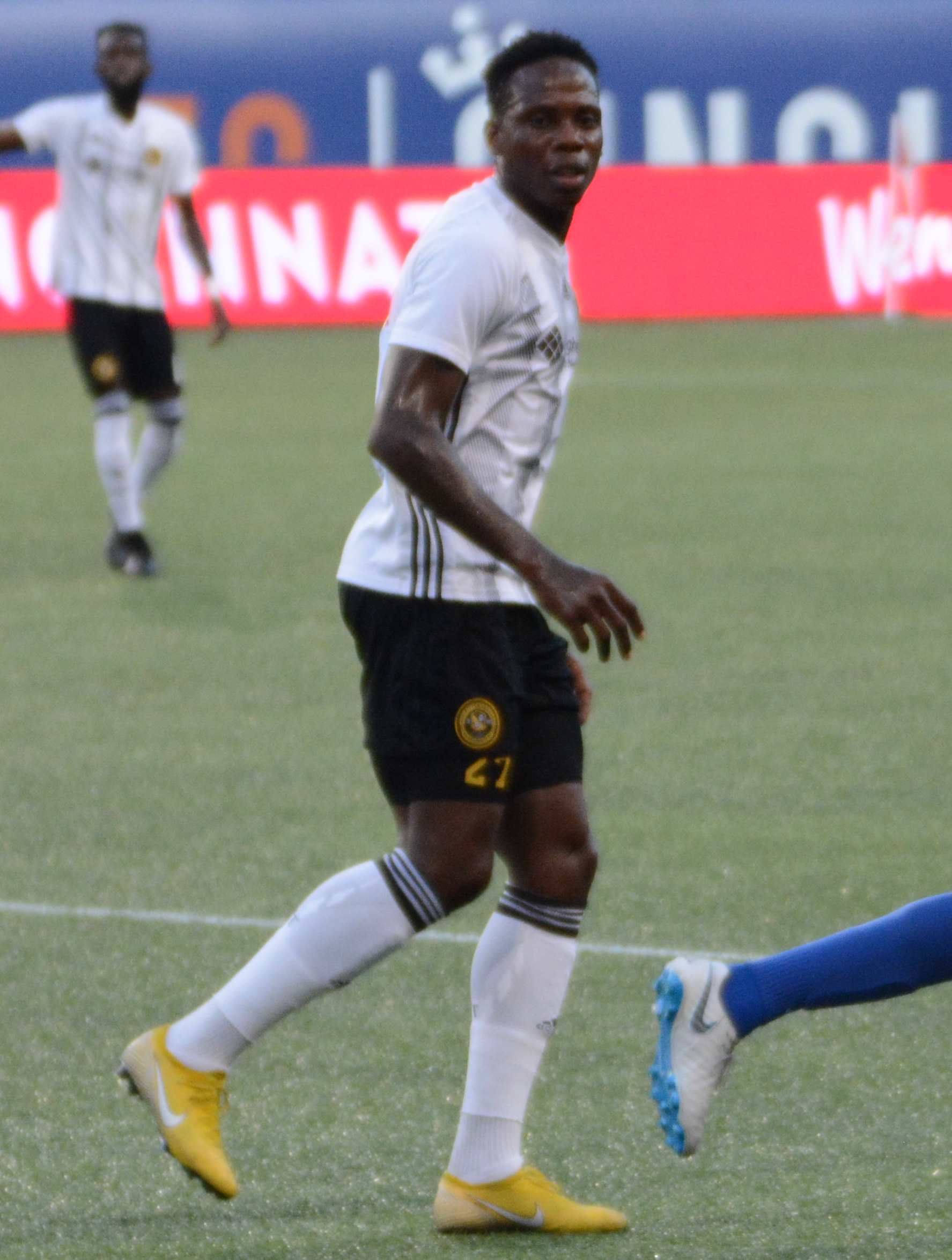
- Parkes with the Pittsburgh Riverhounds in 2018

Personal information
- Full name: Romeo Ovando Parkes
- Date of birth: 11 November 1990 (age 36)
- Place of birth: Port Maria, Jamaica
- Height: 1.76 m (5 ft 9 in)
- Position: Striker

Senior career*
Years	Team	Apps	(Gls)
2009–2014	St. George's	20	(6)
2011	→ Highgate United (loan)	11	(4)
2011–2012	→ Tivoli Gardens (loan)	8	(7)
2012–2013	→ Boys' Town (loan)	0	(0)
2013–2014	→ Portmore United (loan)	3	(0)
2014–2016	Isidro Metapán	68	(9)
2016	Pittsburgh Riverhounds	6	(5)
2016–2017	Isidro Metapán	29	(9)
2017–2018	Pittsburgh Riverhounds	50	(8)
2019–2021	Sligo Rovers	55	(15)
2020	→ New Mexico United (loan)	16	(2)
2022	Miami FC	26	(5)

International career^{‡}
2011	Jamaica U23		
2012–2015	Jamaica	4	(1)
- * Club domestic league appearances and goals as of 22:18, 19 October 2022 (UTC) ‡ National team caps and goals as of 10:57, 16 January 2019 (UTC)

Romeo Ovando Parkes (born 11 November 1990) is a Jamaican professional footballer who plays as a striker.

Parkes has played club football in Jamaica, El Salvador, the United States and Ireland for St. George's, Highgate United, Tivoli Gardens, Boys' Town, Portmore United, Isidro Metapán and Pittsburgh Riverhounds.

He has also represented the Jamaica national team at international level, earning four caps between 2012 and 2015.

== Club career ==
Born in Port Maria, Parkes spent his early career in Jamaica with St. George's, Highgate United, Tivoli Gardens, Boys' Town and Portmore United.

In 2012, Parkes had a two-month trial with Alanyaspor of the Turkish TFF Second League, but was not offered a contract.

In 2014 he signed for top flight Primera División side Isidro Metapán, with whom he won the Apertura 2014 and Clausura 2014.

He moved to American club Pittsburgh Riverhounds in February 2016. On 8 May 2016, during a fixture against New York Red Bulls II, Parkes aimed a heavy kick in to the back of New York's Karl Ouimette who was walking off the pitch following a sending off. Ouimette was subsequently stretchered off the pitch. Due to the perceived severity of his actions, Parkes' contract was terminated by Pittsburgh the following day. The ban was later extended to a worldwide ban in all competitions by FIFA, with the worldwide ban remaining in place until 23 October 2016. Parkes later stated that he thought the ban would be for life.

In June 2016, Parkes returned to his former club Isidro Metapán.

On 5 May 2017, Parkes returned to Pittsburgh Riverhounds.

He signed for Irish club Sligo Rovers in January 2019.

It was announced in January 2020 that Parkes would not return to Sligo Rovers for the 2020 season for personal reasons.

On 8 January 2020, Parkes returned to the United States, joining USL Championship side New Mexico United on loan from Sligo Rovers.

On 8 December 2020, Parkes rejoined Sligo Rovers after his loan spell with New Mexico United ended. After 4 goals in 25 appearances during the 2021 League of Ireland Premier Division season, it was announced that Parkes had left the club to return home on 13 November 2021 after helping the club to a 3rd-place finish in the league.

Parkes joined USL Championship club Miami FC on 1 February 2022.

== International career ==
In August 2011, he was a member of the under-23 national team competing in Olympic qualifying.

He made his senior international debut for Jamaica in 2012, earning a total of 4 caps and scoring once on 30 March 2015 in a friendly against Cuba.

He was named to Jamaica's squad for the 2015 Copa América.

== Career statistics ==
=== International ===
Scores and results list Jamaica's goal tally first.

#	Date	Venue	Opponent	Score	Result	Competition
1	30 March 2015	Catherine Hall Sports Complex, Montego Bay, Jamaica	Cuba	1–0	3–0	Friendly

== Honours ==
Isidro Metapán

- Primera División de Fútbol de El Salvador: Apertura 2014, Clausura 2014
