= Aaron Lawrence =

Jamaican footballer (born 1970)

Personal information
- Date of birth: 11 August 1970 (age 56)
- Place of birth: Lucea, Jamaica
- Height: 1.88 m (6 ft 2 in)
- Position: Goalkeeper

Youth career
- 1985–1989: Rusea's High School

Senior career*
Years	Team	Apps	(Gls)
1989–1995	Violet Kickers		
1996	Long Island Rough Riders	10	(0)
1996–2006	Reno		(1)

International career
1997–2005	Jamaica	74	(1)

Managerial career
- 2006–2009: Reno F.C.
- 2014: Jamaica U15
- 2023–2025: Turks and Caicos Islands men
- * Club domestic league appearances and goals

Aaron Lawrence (born 11 August 1970) is a Jamaican former professional footballer who played as a goalkeeper, making over 60 appearances for the Jamaica national team. In some sources, his birth date is 10 October 1968.

== Club career ==
Aaron played almost whole of his career in his homeland, playing initially for Violet Kickers F.C., having a brief spell at Long Island Rough Riders at the United States and then returning to Jamaica to play for Reno F.C. where he scored during the 2002–03 season.

He was on the verge of joining Birmingham City after obtaining a work permit, but the move fell through after he broke his leg.

== International career ==
Lawrence had been a member of the Jamaica national football team for a little more than a decade. His role was primarily as backup to team captain Warren Barrett, until one memorable performance in 1998 at the World Cup finals in France. Starting in Jamaica's third and final game against Japan, Lawrence shut out the relentless Japanese attackers until late in the game when one sneaked by him. He nevertheless protected Jamaica's slim lead and led them to their first World Cup Finals win, a 2–1 result.

He attempted to secure an overseas contract with a European Club but it proved futile, but the player had emerged as Jamaica's first-choice keeper and had hoped to lead the Jamaica national team to another World Cup appearance. However, with the emergence of Donovan Ricketts, the under twenty-three goalkeeper at the time, Lawrence never managed to fight his way back to the starter's position.

The 'Wild Boy' was a tall and fleet-footed professional. Although there was room for improvement in his positioning and handling of balls crossed into the six-yard box, in his defense he was known for pulling off saves when it mattered most. His experience proved useful for the Jamaica national team in away games. He scored a penalty for Jamaica against India in a friendly match in August 2002.

=== International goals ===
No.	Date	Venue	Opponent	Score	Result	Competition
1	29 August 2002	Vicarage Road, Watford, England	India	2–0	3–0	Friendly

== Coaching career ==
Lawrence coached Reno FC and also served as a goalkeeping coach for the national team, as well as the director of the Real Madrid Academy in Jamaica and manager of second tier Sandals Whitehouse. He is currently coach of the Jamaican national Under-15 team and Rusea's High School football team.

== Personal life ==
Aaron's son, Ruel, was an attacking midfielder playing for Portmore United.
