= Devon Hodges =

Jamaican footballer (born 1984)

Personal information
- Date of birth: 26 July 1984 (age 42)
- Place of birth: St. Ann, Jamaica
- Position: Forward

Youth career
- Louis Strikers

Senior career*
Years	Team	Apps	(Gls)
2003–2004	Wadadah	35	(12)
2004–	Rivoli United	145	(64)
2010	→ Tivoli Gardens (loan)	15	(6)
2011	→ Sông Lam Nghệ An (loan)	12	(9)
2012	TDCS Dong Thap F.C.	4	(1)
2013–2014	Rivoli United	50	(31)
2014–2017	Humble Lions	32	(14)
2018–2019	Mount Pleasant F.A.	9	(9)
2019	Molynes United		

International career
2009–2012	Jamaica	6	(2)
- * Club domestic league appearances and goals

Devon Hodges (born 26 July 1984) is a Jamaican former professional footballer who played as a forward.

== Club career ==
=== Wadadah ===
Hodges started his career with Wadadah in 2003.

=== Rivoli United ===
Hodges moved to Rivoli after teammate Dwight Heron convinced him to join him from Montego Bay to Spanish Town.

He gained local fame by setting the record for most goals scored in a single National Premier League (NPL) game, when he scored 10 during Rivoli's 15–0 trashing (which is also a record) of Invaders in the 2004–05 season.

After relegation to the second level in summer 2006, Hodges scored eight goals in six play-off matches at the end of the 2007–08 season, with four coming in the last match as his team routed his former club Wadadah 11–0 to gain promotion back to the NPL.

In his first season back at the highest level, he immediately became top league goalscorer, scoring 24 goals in the 2008–09 season to keep Rivoli up. Hodges has continued his goalscoring pace in the 2009–10 season with 17 goals as on 5 May 2010. Hodges finished the 2009/10 season with 18 goals in the DPL and finish as the joint leading goalscorer, unfortunately Rivoli United was relegated to the South Central Confederation Super League.

=== Tivoli Gardens ===
On 2 September 2010, Hodges signed with a loan deal with Tivoli Gardens.

=== Sông Lam Nghệ An ===
In January 2011, Hodges signed a six-month loan deal with Sông Lam Nghệ An

=== TDCS Dong Thap F.C. ===
In 2012, Hodges signed with TDCS Dong Thap F.C. for the 2012 V-league season.

=== Rivoli United ===
Hodges returned to Rivoli United in 2013 and led them to the Super League title and a return to the NPL.

=== Mount Pleasant F.A. ===
In 2017, Hodges joined Mount Pleasant F.A. and led them to the RSPL.

=== Molynes United ===
Hodges joined newly promoted Molynes United in 2019, scoring its inaugural Jamaica National Premier League goal.

== International career ==
Hodges made his debut for Jamaica in a May 2009 friendly match against El Salvador and scored his first international goal in his second match against Panama.

== Career statistics ==
=== International ===
Appearances and goals by national team and year
National team	Year	Apps	Goals
Jamaica	2009	6	2
Jamaica	2010	4	0
Total		10	2

Scores and results list Jamaica's goal tally first, score column indicates score after each Hodges goal.

List of international goals scored by Devon Hodges
No.	Date	Venue	Opponent	Score	Result	Competition
1	7 June 2009	Independence Park, Kingston, Jamaica	Panama	2–1	3–2	Friendly
2	16 August 2009	Warner Park Sporting Complex, Basseterre, Saint Kitts and Nevis	Saint Kitts and Nevis	1–0	1–0	Friendly

== Honours ==
Rivoli United

- South Central Confederation Super League: 2007–08

Sông Lam Nghệ An

- V-League: 2011

Mount Pleasant F.A.

- Eastern Confederation Super League: 2017–18
