= Patrick Beech =

Jamaican footballer (born 1975)

Personal information
- Date of birth: 15 March 1975 (age 51)
- Place of birth: Kingston, Jamaica
- Height: 6 ft 0 in (1.83 m)
- Position: Forward

Senior career*
Years	Team	Apps	(Gls)
- Olympic Gardens
1998	Seattle Sounders	23	(12)
1999	New Orleans Riverboat Gamblers	20	(16)
2000	Atlanta Silverbacks	22	(14)
2001	Connecticut Wolves	20	(1)
2001–2003	Rivoli United		
2003–2004	Arnett Gardens		
2004	Rivoli United		

International career
1999	Jamaica	1	(0)
- * Club domestic league appearances and goals

Patrick Beech [patʃrɪk biːtʃ] is a retired Jamaican association football forward who played professionally in Jamaica and the United States.

Beech began his career in Jamaica, playing for Olympic Gardens in the National Premier League. In 1998, Beech moved to the United States where he joined the Seattle Sounders of the USISL A-League. In 1999, he played for the New Orleans Riverboat Gamblers, the Atlanta Silverbacks in 2000 and the Connecticut Wolves in 2001. After a disappointing 2001 season with Connecticut, scoring only one goal, Beech returned to Jamaica in November and signed with Rivoli United F.C. In March 2003, Beech moved from Rivoli United to Arnett Gardens F.C. In 2004, he returned to Rivoli United. In January 2009, Beech played for Duhaney Park.
