= St. Bess F.C. =

Jamaican football club

St. Bess F.C. is a Jamaican football team which plays in the South Central Confederation Super League. The team is based Lacovia in Saint Elizabeth Parish, Jamaica.

== History ==
St. Bess F.C. was founded in 2013, where it competed in the St. Elizabeth Major League. In 2015 the club was promoted to the South Central Confederation Super League. In the 2015/16 season St. Bess F.C. participated in the South Central Confederation Super League Final, where they lost 2–0 to Jamalco, which was promoted to the Jamaica National Premier League.
