= Renae Lloyd =

Jamaican footballer (born 1987)

Personal information
- Date of birth: 22 June 1987 (age 39)
- Height: 1.80 m (5 ft 11 in)
- Position: Midfielder

Team information
- Current team: Boys' Town

Senior career*
Years	Team	Apps	(Gls)
2006–	Boys' Town		

International career^{‡}
2012–	Jamaica	5	(0)
- * Club domestic league appearances and goals as of 27 June 2012 ‡ National team caps and goals as of 27 June 2012

Renae Lloyd (born 22 June 1987) is a Jamaican international footballer who plays for Boys' Town, as a midfielder.

== Career ==
Lloyd has played club football for Boys' Town.

He made his international debut for Jamaica in 2012.
