= Kevin Lamey =

Jamaican footballer (born 1975)

Personal information
- Full name: Kevin Andre Lamey
- Date of birth: 8 October 1975 (age 51)
- Place of birth: Portmore, Jamaica
- Height: 5 ft 10 in (1.78 m)
- Position: Striker

Senior career*
Years	Team	Apps	(Gls)
1994–2006	Waterhouse	55	(52)
1998	→ Seattle Sounders (loan)	2	(1)
1998	→ Montreal Impact (loan)	3	(2)
2006–2007	Kuala Lumpur FA	27	(23)
2007	Pahang FA	28	(12)
2007–2011	Waterhouse	40	(35)
2011–2018	Humble Lions		(22)

International career^{‡}
2000–2007	Jamaica		
- * Club domestic league appearances and goals as of 11 May 2010 ‡ National team caps and goals as of 11 May 2010

Kevin Andre Lamey (born 8 October 1975) is a Jamaican former professional footballer who played as a striker.
