= Jermaine Anderson (Jamaican footballer) =

Jamaican footballer (born 1979)

Personal information
- Date of birth: 22 February 1979 (age 47)
- Place of birth: Falmouth, Jamaica
- Height: 1.79 m (5 ft 10 in)
- Position: Forward

Senior career*
Years	Team	Apps	(Gls)
2002–2003	Village United		
2003–2004	Seba United		
2004–2007	Wadadah		(39)
2008–2013	Waterhouse		
2014	Águila	15	(6)
2014–2017	Waterhouse	70	(22)
2017–2018	Boys' Town F.C.		

International career
2002–2014	Jamaica	11	(2)
- * Club domestic league appearances and goals

Jermaine "Tuffy" Anderson (born 22 February 1979) is a Jamaican former professional footballer who played as a forward.

== Honours ==
Waterhouse FC

- JFF Champions Cup: 2013
