= Christopher Nicholas =

Jamaican footballer (born 1981)

Personal information
- Date of birth: 16 January 1981 (age 45)
- Place of birth: Jamaica
- Position: Forward

Senior career*
Years	Team	Apps	(Gls)
1998–2008	Tivoli Gardens F.C.		
2008–2010	Portmore United F.C.		(1+)
2010–2012	Tivoli Gardens F.C.		(3+)
2017–2018	Tivoli Gardens F.C.	2	(0)

International career
2001–2005	Jamaica	6	(0)
- * Club domestic league appearances and goals

Christopher Nicholas (born 16 January 1981) is a Jamaican former professional footballer who played as a forward.

== Playing career ==
Nicholas had an extensive playing career in Jamaica domestic premiere featuring for Tivoli Gardens and Portmore United.

He played on numerous occasions for Jamaica's u20 national team and was part of the Jamaica squad, 2001 FIFA World Youth Championship squads, at the 2001 FIFA u20 World Cup in Argentina.

== Coaching career ==
As of 2024, Nicholas is the head coach of Tivoli Gardens High School in Kingston, Jamaica.
