= Elleston Wakeland Stadium =

Multi-use stadium in Falmouth, Jamaica

- Elleston Wakeland Stadium (Jamaica)
- Interactive map of Elleston Wakeland Stadium
- Address: Falmouth
- Location: Falmouth, Trelawny, Jamaica
- Coordinates: 18.4875866°N 77.6604652°W
- Capacity: 3,000
- Surface: Natural grass

Tenant
- Village United F.C. (Jamaica primer league) Falmouth United F.C. (western confederation super league) 20117 - present

Elleston Wakeland Stadium is a multi-use stadium in Falmouth, Jamaica. It is currently used mostly for football matches. It serves as a home ground of Village United F.C. & Falmouth united. The stadium holds 3,000 people.
