= Buff Bay, Jamaica =

Settlement in Portland, Jamaica

Coordinates: 18.233°N 76.659°W

Location of Buff Bay in Jamaica

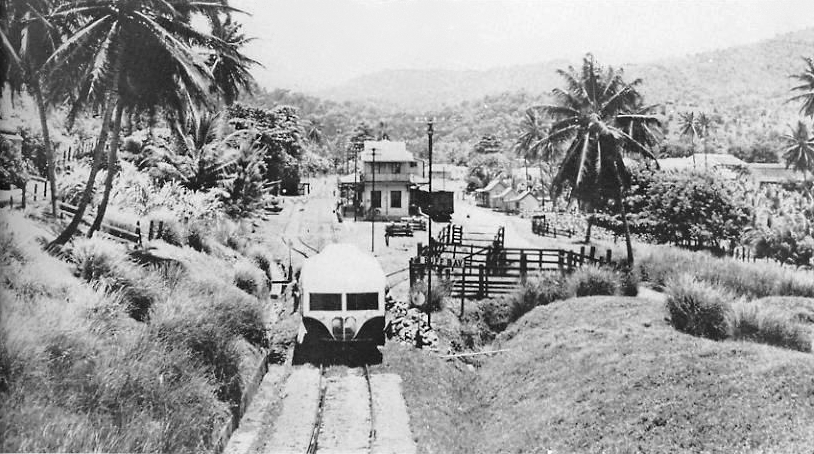
Buff Bay Station in 1960.

Buff Bay is a settlement in Portland, Jamaica. This settlement is adjoined by the districts of Windsor Castle and Hart Hill.

The town has many buildings dating from the early 19th century. On the seaside of the town stands the Anglican church known as St. George's Parish Church. It dates from the time when Buff Bay was the capital of the parish of the same name. This parish was later divided into the present parishes of St. Mary and Portland.
