= Frome Sports Club =

Stadium in Savanna-la-Mar, Jamaica

- Interactive map of Frome Sports Club
- Location: Frome, Westmoreland, Jamaica
- Coordinates: 18.2960°N 78.1499°W
- Capacity: 2,000

Frome Sports Club is a multi-use stadium in Frome near Savanna-la-Mar, Jamaica. It is currently used mostly for football matches. It serves as a home ground of Reno FC. The stadium holds 2,000 people.
