= Roen Nelson =

Jamaican footballer (born 1980)

Personal information
- Date of birth: 8 April 1980 (age 46)
- Place of birth: Jamaica
- Height: 1.79 m (5 ft 10 1/2 in)
- Position: Striker

Team information
- Current team: Portmore United

Senior career*
Years	Team	Apps	(Gls)
2001–2004	Portmore United		
2004	Joe Public		
2004–2005	Portmore United		
2005	Joe Public		
2005–2006	Portmore United		
2006–2007	Joe Public		
2007–2008	Portmore United		
2008	Joe Public		
2009	Chengdu Blades	8	(1)
2009–	Portmore United		

International career
2002–2008	Jamaica	12	(0)
- * Club domestic league appearances and goals as of 14 May 2011

Roen Nelson (born 8 April 1980) is a Jamaican international footballer who plays for Portmore United, as a striker.

== Career ==
Nelson has played in Jamaica for Portmore United, in Trinidad for Joe Public, and in China for Chengdu Blades.

Nelson also earned twelve caps for the Jamaica national team between 2002 and 2008.
