= Western Confederation Super League =

- Country: Jamaica
- Confederation: CONCACAF
- Number of clubs: 12
- Level on pyramid: 3
- Promotion to: JFF National Tier II

The Captain's Bakery Western Confederation Super League is a third division football league in the nation of Jamaica. The twelve teams that currently compete in the league are based in the parishes of Hanover, St. James, Trelawny and Westmoreland.

At the end of each season the winners qualify for the National Premier League Playoff along with the winners of the KSAFA Super League, South Central Confederation Super League and Eastern Confederation Super League.

These four teams play each other, home and away, with the top two teams from this playoff being promoted to the Jamaica National Premier League.

== Member teams 2010/11 ==
- Bamboo F.C. (Hanover)
- Catherine Hall F.C. (Montego Bay, St James)
- Exidus (Trelawny)
- Frome F.C. (Westmoreland)
- Granville F.C. (St James)
- Mount Pelier F.C. (Montpelier, St James)
- Petersfield (Westmoreland)
- Prosper F.C. (Hanover)
- Seba United F.C. (Montego Bay, St James)
- Tomorrow's People
- Violet Kickers F.C. (Montego Bay, St James)
- Wadadah F.C. (Montego Bay, St James)

== Past Champions ==
- 2019:
- 2018: Wadadah F.C.
- 2017:. Sandals South Coast
- 2016:. Granville Utd F.C
- 2015:. Savannah S.C
- 2014: Reno F.C
- 2013: Wadadah F.C
- 2012:
- 2011: Seba United F.C.
- 2010: Reno F.C.
- 2009: Wadadah F.C.
- 2008: Granville F.C.
- 2007:
- 2006:
- 2005:
- 2004:
