= Leon Strickland =

Jamaican footballer (born 1982)

Personal information
- Full name: Leon Strickland
- Date of birth: 20 July 1982 (age 44)
- Place of birth: Jamaica
- Position: Striker

Team information
- Current team: Arnett Gardens

Senior career*
Years	Team	Apps	(Gls)
2004–2007	Arnett Gardens		
2007–2008	Arnett Gardens	16	(7)
2008–2009	Waterhouse	1	(0)
2009–	Arnett Gardens		

International career^{‡}
2006	Jamaica	1	(0)
- * Club domestic league appearances and goals as of 4 February 2008 ‡ National team caps and goals as of 11 December 2007

Leon Strickland (born 20 July 1982) is a Jamaican professional football player who plays as a striker, he currently plays for Arnett Gardens in the top-flight Jamaica National Premier League.

== Career ==
He was Arnett Gardens' top goalscorer in the 2006/2007 season. In January 2008 he joined Waterhouse F.C. but halfway next season he rejoined Arnett.

== International career ==
Strickland made his debut for Jamaica in a November 2006 friendly match against Peru, coming on as a late substitute for Jamal Campbell-Ryce.
