= Violet Kickers F.C. =

Jamaican football club

- Full name: Violet Kickers Football Club
- Ground: UDC Field; Montego Bay
- Chairman: Collin Brydson
- Manager: Jamal Hendricks
- League: Western Confederation Super League

Violet Kickers F.C. is a club team in Jamaica, that competes in the Western Confed. At level 2 in the National leagues. They won the Jamaica National Premier League Title on two occasions in 1993/1994 and 1995/1996, but fell from grace and now no longer compete at that level of football.

They only returned to competitive football in the 2004/2005 season after they had changed names to Mount Salem in the 2000/2001 National A League season. As a result of the name change, the Jamaica Football Federation (JFF) had ruled that no team would be allowed to use the name for a three-year period.

== Achievements ==
- Jamaica National Premier League: 2

1994, 1996

== Team management ==
- Head coach: Vinton Williams
- Asst coach: Wayne Johnson
