= Ferdi Neita Sports Complex =

Multi-use stadium in Portmore, Jamaica

- Interactive map of Ferdi Neita Sports Complex
- Location: Portmore, St. Catherine
- Coordinates: 17.9527°N 76.9028°W
- Capacity: 3,000
- Surface: Grass

Tenants
- Portmore United (JPL) 2003-present Racing United (JPL) 2024-present

Ferdi Neita Sports Complex (sometimes Feride) is a multi-use stadium in Portmore, Jamaica. It is currently used mostly for football matches and as a practising ground. It serves as a home ground of Portmore United F.C. The stadium holds 3,000 people.
