= South Central Confederation Super League =

- Country: Jamaica
- Confederation: CONCACAF
- Number of clubs: 12
- Level on pyramid: 3
- Promotion to: JFF National Tier II

The South Central Confederation Super League is a second division football league in the nation of Jamaica. The twelve teams that currently compete in the league are based in the parishes of Clarendon, Manchester, St. Catherine and St. Elizabeth.

At the end of each season the winners qualify for the National Premier League Playoff along with the winners of the KSAFA Super League, Eastern Confederation Super League and Western Confederation Super League.

These four teams play each other, home and away, with the top two teams from this playoff being promoted to the Jamaica National Premier League.

== Member teams for Season 2020 ==
- Black Stars F.C. (Black River, St Elizabeth)
- Downs F.C. (Manchester)
- Holland F.C. (St Elizabeth)
- Real Treasure Beach F.C. (Jamaica) (St Elizabeth)
- Los Profectos F.C. (Manchester)
- Greenvale F.C. (Manchester)
- Tafari Lions F.C. (St Elizabeth)
- St. Bess F.C. (St Elizabeth)

== Member teams for Season 2016-17 ==
- Black Stars F.C. (St Elizabeth)
- Downs F.C. (Manchester)
- Dunbeholden F.C. (Spanish Town)
- Hillstars F.C. (Manchester)
- Holland P.Y.C. (St Elizabeth)
- Kemps Hill F.C. (Clarendon)
- New Bowens F.C. (St Catherine)
- Rivoli United F.C. (Spanish Town)
- Ricam Academy (Manchester)
- Sporting Central Academy (St Catherine)
- St. Bess F.C. (St Elizabeth)
- Tru Juice F.C. (St Catherine)

== Member teams 2014 ==
2014 featured only 8 teams instead of 12.

- Newell
- Jamalco
- New Green
- Black Stars F.C. (St Elizabeth)
- Alligator Pond
- DB Basovak
- Newlands
- Treadlight
