= St. George's S.C. =

Jamaican football club

St. George’s S.C.
- Full name: St. George's Sports Club
- Nickname: Portlanders
- Founded: 1962
- Ground: Lynch Park, Buff Bay; Portland, Jamaica
- Capacity: 2,000
- Manager: Oraine Selvin
- League: Portland Major League
- Website: stgeorgessc.com
Home colours	Away colours

St. George's Sports Club is a football team founded in 1962 in Buff Bay, Portland, Jamaica, founded in 1962 in the top-flight Jamaica National Premier League. The home ground of the club is Lynch Park which is situated by the shoreline of the north coast in the city of Buff Bay, Portland.

St George's clinched promotion to the top level in June 2007 and are the first team from Portland to grace the Premier League since Taurus in the early 1990s. They returned to the NPL after more than 19 years. After relegation in the 2012 season, the club has gone throw several processes of rebuilding to attain a position in the Premier League.

At the start of the 2018–2019 season, a new management structure was established.

== Club executives ==
- President : Kingsley Chin
- Director of Business : Fabio Pencle
- Operations Manager : Oraine Selvin
- Administrative Officer : Cadine Brown
- Field & Administrative Support : Colin Leigh
- Player Liaison Officer : Nicole Thomas
- Player Liaison Assistant : Santana Wyndham
- Equipment Support : Colin Leigh
- Players Representative :
- Honorary Executive President : Everton King
- Coaches
  - Brenton Lopez

== Achievements ==
- Major League Champions (PFA)2018–2019
- Promoted to Premier League 2007
- Many time Portland division 1 champion,
- KO champion and Eastern Confed Super League Champion
- Has represented Eastern Jamaica in the National premier league in 1988–89 and in 1989–90
- Represented Eastern Confed. in the 2000 National A’ League

== Managerial history ==
- (Jamaica) Brenton Lopez (2018–present)
- (Jamaica) Karl Wilson (2019–present)
- (Jamaica) Geoffrey Maxwell (2010–2012)
