= Wadadah F.C. =

Jamaican football club

Wadadah
- Full name: Wadadah Football Club
- Founded: 1983
- Ground: Jarrett Park; Montego Bay, Jamaica
- Capacity: 4,000
- Chairman: Daniel Ricketts
- Manager: Daniel Ricketts
- League: JFF Western Confederation Super League
- 2015–2016: 2nd
Home colours

Wadadah F.C. (means Peace and Love) is a Jamaican football team playing at the second level, the Western Confederation Super League.

== History ==
The club began in 1983 when it entered the St. James Division in Division II. In its first year it won Division II and was promoted to Division I (which was the highest league a club could play in at that time).

Wadadah was relegated to the second tier of Jamaican football after finishing the 2006–2007 season in 11th place.

== Achievements ==
- Jamaica National Premier League: 2

1988, 1992
