= Village United F.C. =

Jamaican football club

- Full name: Village United Football Club
- Founded: 1968; 58 years ago
- Ground: Elleston Wakeland Stadium; Falmouth, Jamaica
- Capacity: 3,000
- President: Daine Thomas
- Manager: Preston Bernard
- League: Western Confederation (Level 2 on football pyramid)
Home colours	Away colours

Village United Football Club is a Jamaican football team playing at the 2nd level of the football pyramid in Jamaica which is regional placing the club in the Western Confederation. The other regional areas are Eastern Confederation, South Central Confederation and Kingston and St. Andrew Confederation (KASFA).

The club is based in Falmouth and their current home stadium is the Elleston Wakeland Stadium in Falmouth, which has a capacity of 3,000 people. The club moved from Falmouth's Elleston Wakeland Stadium in the 2010–2011 season to Trelawny Stadium that had a capacity of 25,000, but moved back after relegation in the 2011–2012 season.

The team has never won the National Premier League.

== History ==
Village United F.C was formed on September 8, 1968 in an area of Falmouth called Village or Compound. The area is located opposite the Elleston Wakeland Stadium.

=== Achievements ===
- A-league champions 2001–2003
