= Humble Lions F.C. =

Jamaican football club

Humble Lion
- Full name: Humble Lion Football Club
- Founded: 1974
- Ground: Effortville Community Centre; May Pen, Clarendon, Jamaica
- Capacity: 1,500
- President: Christopher N. Jackson
- Head Coach: Davion Meggo
- League: Jamaica Premier League
- 2023–24: Regular season: 10th Playoffs: Did not qualify
Home colours

Humble Lions Football Club is a Jamaican professional football club based in May Pen, which plays in the Jamaica Premier League, the top flight of Jamaican football.

== Club name ==
Though their club crest calls them Humble Lion F.C, they are often referred to by the Singular Humble Lion F.C.

== History ==
Founded in 1974 as a team of Rastafarians, Humble Lions F.C. was promoted to the Jamaica Premier League for the first time at the end of the 2008–09 season, making their debut in Jamaica's major football top-flight.

They finished both of their first two seasons in the top tier just above the relegation zone but spent big in summer 2011 when looking for a promising start of the 2011–12 season. Humble Lions F.C. has seen notable coaches such as Lenworth Hyde, Donovan Duckie, and Vassell Reynolds. Their president is a Jamaican politician Mike Henry.

== Ground ==
The team is based in Effortville, a part of May Pen in central Clarendon, with their home ground at the Effortville Community Centre.

== Players ==
As of 10 November 2023

Note: Flags indicate national team as defined under FIFA eligibility rules; some limited exceptions apply. Players may hold more than one non-FIFA nationality.

No.	Pos.	Nation	Player
1	GK	JAM	Shamal Briscoe
3	DF	JAM	Xavian Virgo
6	MF	JAM	Fabion Pascoe
7	FW	JAM	Roshane Sharpe
8	DF	JAM	Raheem Porter
10	FW	JAM	Jermaine Christian
11	FW	JAM	Javon Smith
12	MF	JAM	Andrew Vanzie
14	FW	JAM	Andre Clennon

No.	Pos.	Nation	Player
16	DF	JAM	Ricardo Campbell
17	DF	JAM	Tevoy Coldspring
20	FW	JAM	Rafeik Thomas
21	MF	JAM	Jardel Williams
23	FW	JAM	Norlan Beckford
24	MF	JAM	Cachje Jackson
27	DF	JAM	Ricko Edwards
30	DF	JAM	Afiba Chambers
40	GK	JAM	Prince-Daniel Smith

=== Other players under contract ===
Note: Flags indicate national team as defined under FIFA eligibility rules; some limited exceptions apply. Players may hold more than one non-FIFA nationality.

No.	Pos.	Nation	Player
—	MF	JAM	Karim Bryan
—	MF	JAM	Leaunghn Williams
—		JAM	Craig Bailey
—	MF	JAM	Dajay Edwards

== Honours ==
- South Central Confederation Super League
  - Winners: 2009
