= Rivoli United F.C. =

Jamaican football club

Rivoli United
- Full name: Rivoli United Football Club
- Ground: Prison Oval, Spanish Town or Bramwell Clarke Sports Complex, Ewarton, Jamaica
- Capacity: 2,000
- Manager: Calvert Fitzgerald
- League: South Central Confederation Super League
- 2014–15: 9th
Home colours	Away colours

Rivoli United F.C. is a Jamaican football team who play in the South Central Confederation Super League.

They are based in Spanish Town and their home stadium is the Prison Oval.

== History ==
Rivoli relegated to the second level of Jamaican football after finishing bottom in the 2005/2006 season. In June 2008 they finished runner-up in the promotion play-offs to clinch a place among the elite for the 2008/2009 season. The team was relegated at the end of the 2009/10 season.

At the start of November, Rivoli's match against Reno was postponed because of the sudden death of midfielder Enrico Beech. In their 2015/16 season they finished second to bottom of the table being relegated to the South Central Confederation Super League.
