= F.C. Reno =

Jamaican football club

Reno
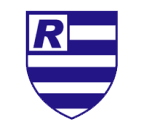
- Full name: Football Club Reno
- Nickname: Whistling Westerners
- Ground: Frome Sports Club; Savanna-la-Mar, Jamaica
- Capacity: 2,000
- President: Radford Malcolm
- Technical Director: Wendell Downswell
- League: JFF National Tier II
- 2018–19: National Premier League, Regular season: 12th (relegated); Playoffs: Did not qualify
Home colours	Away colours

Football Club Reno is a Jamaican football team based in Savanna-la-Mar, the capital of the parish of Westmoreland, in western Jamaica. Their home stadium is Frome Sports Club, which can hold a capacity of up to 2,000. The club was known as Reno FC until 2015, when the name was reworked to FC Reno.

== History ==
Reno were Jamaican champions three times in the 1990s. After over 10 years in the NPL, they were relegated to the Western Super League in 2009, only to return in 2010 after a year in the second division. They were, however, relegated again in 2012.

== Achievements ==
- Jamaica Premier League: 3

1990, 1991, 1995

- Western Confederation Super League: 1

2010

- JFF Champions Cup: 3

1995, 1996, 2014

== Current squad ==
=== Retired numbers ===
7 – (Jamaica) Caple Donaldson, midfielder – posthumous honour.
