= Boys' Town F.C. =

Jamaican football club

- Full name: Boys' Town Football Club
- Nickname: The Red Brigade
- Founded: 1940; 86 years ago
- Ground: Collie Smith Drive Sporting Complex; Kingston, Jamaica
- Capacity: 2,000
- Chairman: Dr. Winston Davidson
- Manager: Andrew Price
- League: KSAFA Championship
Home colours	Away colours

Boys' Town Football Club is a Jamaican professional football club based in the community of Trench Town in Kingston. The club currently competes in the KSAFA Championship.

The team's home ground is at the Collie Smith Drive Sporting Complex, which can hold up to 2,000 spectators.

It is said that Bob Marley was a fan of this club.

== History ==
Boys' Town was founded as a Christian project in 1940 by Reverend Father Hugh Sherlock for the young people in Kingston's Trench Town community. They have won the national league title on three occasions, the most recent in 1988.

Previous club crest

== Recent seasons ==
After finishing runners-up to Tivoli Gardens in the 2010–11 season, they started the 2011–12 season on a low after fielding an ineligible player (Marvin Morgan, Jr.) in their first two matches and were deducted one point.

== Honours ==
- Jamaica Premier League
  - Champions (3): 1983–84, 1985–86, 1988–89
  - Runners-up (5): 1973–74, 1975–76, 1986–87,
- JFF Champions Cup
  - Winners (2): 2008–09, 2009–10
  - Runners-up (1): 2006–07
- KSAFA Jackie Bell Knockout Competition
  - Champions (1): 2005–06
  - Runners-up (4): 2003–04, 2006–07, 2011–12, 2012–13

== See also ==
- Boys' Town Cricket Club
