= 2009 CONCACAF U-20 Championship squads =

Below are the rosters for the 2009 CONCACAF U-20 Championship held in Trinidad and Tobago from March 6–15, 2009.

== Canada ==
Coach: Tony Fonseca (Canada)

No.	Pos.	Player	Date of birth (age)	Caps	Goals	Club
1	GK	Adam Street	7 July 1991 (aged 17)	0	0	(The Football Association) West Ham United
2	DF	Eddy Sidra	20 February 1989 (aged 20)	0	0	(German Football Association) Energie Cottbus
3	DF	Alex Surprenant	4 September 1989 (aged 19)	9	0	(Canadian Soccer Association) Montreal Impact
4	DF	Nana Attakora-Gyan	27 March 1989 (aged 20)	20	0	(Canadian Soccer Association) Toronto FC
5	DF	Adam Straith	11 September 1990 (aged 18)	7	1	(German Football Association) Energie Cottbus
6	MF	Philippe Davies	12 December 1990 (aged 18)	10	0	(Canadian Soccer Association) Vancouver Whitecaps FC
7	MF	Shaun Saiko	13 November 1989 (aged 19)	6	1	(The Football Association) Middlesbrough
8	MF	Michael Pereira	3 September 1989 (aged 19)	0	0	(United States Soccer Federation) Providence College
9	FW	Marcus Haber	11 January 1989 (aged 20)	21	1	(Canadian Soccer Association) Vancouver Whitecaps FC
10	MF	Kennedy Owusu-Ansah	20 July 1989 (aged 19)	0	0	(German Football Association) Hertha BSC
11	FW	Igor Pisanjuk	24 October 1989 (aged 19)	5	2	(Hungarian Football Federation) Ferencvárosi
12	MF	Brandon Bonifacio	29 July 1989 (aged 19)	5	0	(Royal Dutch Football Association) SC Cambuur
13	MF	Fabrice Lassonde	18 February 1989 (aged 20)	0	0	(German Football Association) Ingolstadt 04
14	MF	Derek Gaudet	14 May 1989 (aged 19)	7	0	Unattached
15	DF	Paris Nakajima-Farran	11 August 1989 (aged 19)	11	0	(Danish Football Association) Næstved
16	FW	Kyle Porter	19 January 1990 (aged 19)	7	0	(German Football Association) Energie Cottbus
17	FW	Randy Edwini-Bonsu	20 April 1990 (aged 18)	5	3	(Canadian Soccer Association) Vancouver Whitecaps FC
18	GK	Julien Latendresse-Levesque	27 February 1991 (aged 18)	0	0	(Canadian Soccer Association) Vancouver Whitecaps FC
19	FW	Teal Bunbury	27 February 1990 (aged 19)	2	1	(United States Soccer Federation) University of Akron
20	MF	Ethan Gage	8 May 1991 (aged 17)	11	0	(Canadian Soccer Association) Vancouver Whitecaps FC

== Costa Rica ==
No.	Pos.	Player	Date of birth (age)	Caps	Goals	Club
1	GK	Esteban Alvarado	April 28, 1989 (aged 19)			(Costa Rican Football Federation) Universidad de Costa Rica
2	DF	José Mena	February 2, 1989 (aged 20)			(Costa Rican Football Federation) Deportivo Saprissa
3	DF	Kenner Gutierrez	June 9, 1989 (aged 19)			(Costa Rican Football Federation) LD Alajuelense
4	DF	Juan Monge	April 25, 1990 (aged 18)			(Costa Rican Football Federation) Deportivo Saprissa
5	DF	Derrick Johnson	July 28, 1989 (aged 19)			(Costa Rican Football Federation) Brujas FC
6	DF	Ricardo Blanco	May 12, 1989 (aged 19)			(Costa Rican Football Federation) Deportivo Saprissa
7	FW	Marco Ureña	March 5, 1990 (aged 19)			(Costa Rican Football Federation) LD Alajuelense
8	MF	David Guzmán	February 18, 1990 (aged 19)			(Costa Rican Football Federation) Deportivo Saprissa
9	FW	Jorge Castro	September 11, 1990 (aged 18)			(Costa Rican Football Federation) Deportivo Saprissa
10	MF	Carlos Hernandez	August 29, 1989 (aged 19)			(Costa Rican Football Federation) C.S. Herediano
11	MF	Diego Madrigal	March 19, 1989 (aged 19)			(Costa Rican Football Federation) Universidad de Costa Rica
12	DF	Cristian Gamboa	October 24, 1989 (aged 19)			(Costa Rican Football Federation) Liberia Mia
13	MF	Allen Guevara	April 16, 1989 (aged 19)			(Costa Rican Football Federation) Liberia Mia
14	DF	Bryan Oviedo	February 18, 1990 (aged 19)			(Costa Rican Football Federation) Deportivo Saprissa
15	FW	Javier Escoe	April 6, 1991 (aged 17)			(Costa Rican Football Federation) Deportivo Saprissa
16	MF	Diego Estrada	May 25, 1989 (aged 19)			(Costa Rican Football Federation) LD Alajuelense
17	FW	Josué Martínez	March 25, 1990 (aged 18)			(Costa Rican Football Federation) Deportivo Saprissa
18	GK	Minor Álvarez	November 14, 1989 (aged 19)			(Costa Rican Football Federation) Deportivo Saprissa
19	DF	José Daniel Varela Muñóz	April 30, 1990 (aged 18)			(Costa Rican Football Federation) Brujas FC
20	MF	Esteban Luna	January 5, 1990 (aged 19)			(Costa Rican Football Federation) Deportivo Saprissa

== El Salvador ==
Coach: Norberto Huezo (El Salvador)

No.	Pos.	Player	Date of birth (age)	Caps	Goals	Club
	GK	Diego Cuellar	10 August 1990 (aged 18)			Unattached
	GK	Óscar Arroyo	28 January 1990 (aged 19)			(Salvadoran Football Federation) FAS
	DF	Andrés Menéndez	9 February 1990 (aged 19)			(Salvadoran Football Federation) Nejapa
	DF	César López				Unattached
	DF	Xavier García	26 June 1990 (aged 18)			(Salvadoran Football Federation) Luis Ángel Firpo
	DF	Juan Carlos Alas	30 June 1989 (aged 19)			(Salvadoran Football Federation) Alianza
	DF	Nelson Rivera	24 June 1991 (aged 17)			(Salvadoran Football Federation) Juventud Independiente
	DF	Gilberto Baires	11 April 1990 (aged 18)			(Salvadoran Football Federation) Atlético Marte
	DF	Irza Romel Santos				(Salvadoran Football Federation) Municipal Limeño
	DF	Alexander Mendoza	4 June 1990 (aged 18)			(Salvadoran Football Federation) Vendaval Apopa
	MF	Irving Flores	9 September 1989 (aged 19)			(Salvadoran Football Federation) Águila San Isidro
	MF	Jorge Morán	10 October 1989 (aged 19)			(Salvadoran Football Federation) Isidro Metapán
	MF	Fabricio Alfaro	3 November 1990 (aged 18)			Unattached
	MF	William Maldonado	3 January 1990 (aged 19)			(Salvadoran Football Federation) FAS
	MF	Diego Chavarría				(Salvadoran Football Federation) Santa Tecla
	MF	Jaime Alas	30 July 1989 (aged 19)			(Argentine Football Association) River Plate
	MF	Herbert Sosa	11 January 1990 (aged 19)			(Salvadoran Football Federation) Alianza
	FW	Léster Blanco	17 January 1989 (aged 20)			(Salvadoran Football Federation) Chalatenango
	FW	Ricardo Orellana	26 August 1990 (aged 18)			(Salvadoran Football Federation) Luis Ángel Firpo
	FW	Andrés Flores	31 August 1990 (aged 18)			Unattached

== Honduras ==
Coach: Emilio Umanzor (Honduras)

No.	Pos.	Player	Date of birth (age)	Caps	Goals	Club
1	GK	Francisco Reyes	7 February 1990 (aged 19)			(National Autonomous Federation of Football of Honduras) Olimpia
2	DF	Porfirio Boquín	22 December 1989 (aged 19)			(National Autonomous Federation of Football of Honduras) Hispano
3	MF	Angel Castro	8 September 1990 (aged 18)			(National Autonomous Federation of Football of Honduras) Olimpia
4	MF	Wilmer Crisanto	24 June 1989 (aged 19)			(National Autonomous Federation of Football of Honduras) Victoria
5	DF	José Fonseca	27 May 1990 (aged 18)			(National Autonomous Federation of Football of Honduras) Olimpia
6	DF	Esdras Padilla	4 September 1989 (aged 19)			(National Autonomous Federation of Football of Honduras) Motagua
7	MF	Mario Martínez	30 July 1989 (aged 19)			(National Autonomous Federation of Football of Honduras) Real España
8	MF	Reinieri Mayorquín	13 July 1989 (aged 19)			(National Autonomous Federation of Football of Honduras) Marathón
9	FW	Julio Canales	1 July 1989 (aged 19)			(National Autonomous Federation of Football of Honduras) Real Juventud
10	MF	Erick Andino	21 July 1989 (aged 19)			(National Autonomous Federation of Football of Honduras) Olimpia
11	FW	Roger Rojas	9 June 1990 (aged 18)			(National Autonomous Federation of Football of Honduras) Olimpia
12	GK	José Mendoza	21 July 1989 (aged 19)			(National Autonomous Federation of Football of Honduras) Platense
13	MF	Ronald Martínez	26 July 1990 (aged 18)			(National Autonomous Federation of Football of Honduras) Motagua
14	MF	Christian Altamirano	26 November 1989 (aged 19)			(National Autonomous Federation of Football of Honduras) Deportes Savio
15	FW	Anthony Lozano	25 April 1993 (aged 15)			(National Autonomous Federation of Football of Honduras) Olimpia
16	DF	Johnny Leverón	7 February 1990 (aged 19)			(National Autonomous Federation of Football of Honduras) Motagua
17	MF	Erick Zepeda	20 June 1990 (aged 18)			(National Autonomous Federation of Football of Honduras) Platense
18	MF	Julio Ocampo	12 February 1990 (aged 19)			(National Autonomous Federation of Football of Honduras) Real Juventud
19	FW	José Valladares	16 July 1989 (aged 19)			(National Autonomous Federation of Football of Honduras) Motagua
20	MF	Alfredo Mejía	3 April 1990 (aged 18)			(National Autonomous Federation of Football of Honduras) Real España

== Jamaica ==
Coach: Donovan Duckie (Jamaica)

No.	Pos.	Player	Date of birth (age)	Caps	Goals	Club
1	GK	Gariece McPherson	14 May 1989 (aged 19)			(Jamaica Football Federation) Portmore United
3	DF	Keithy Simpson	19 April 1990 (aged 18)			(Jamaica Football Federation) Sporting Central Academy
4	DF	Andre Darby	5 May 1989 (aged 19)			(Jamaica Football Federation) Portmore United
5	MF	Andre Steele	21 March 1990 (aged 18)			(Jamaica Football Federation) Harbour View
6	DF	Levaughn Williams	3 October 1989 (aged 19)			(Jamaica Football Federation) Sporting Central Academy
7	MF	Evan Taylor	25 January 1989 (aged 20)			(Jamaica Football Federation) Reno
8	MF	Kaydian Wynter	14 January 1989 (aged 20)			(Jamaica Football Federation) Sporting Central Academy
9	FW	Alanzo Adlam	12 March 1989 (aged 19)			(Jamaica Football Federation) Sporting Central Academy
10	MF	Romário Campbell	22 June 1990 (aged 18)			(Jamaica Football Federation) Harbour View
11	MF	Davion Thorpe	6 September 1989 (aged 19)			(Jamaica Football Federation) Reno
12	DF	Damaine Thompson	18 February 1990 (aged 19)			(Jamaica Football Federation) Bamboo United
13	GK	Andre Blake	21 November 1990 (aged 18)			(Jamaica Football Federation) Sporting Central Academy
14	FW	Andre Clennon	15 August 1989 (aged 19)			(Jamaica Football Federation) Waterhouse
15	DF	Andrae Campbell	14 March 1989 (aged 19)			(Jamaica Football Federation) Portmore United
16	DF	Christopher Banner	3 March 1990 (aged 19)			(Jamaica Football Federation) Sporting Central Academy
17	MF	Shamar Shelton	20 September 1989 (aged 19)			(Jamaica Football Federation) Harbour View
18	MF	John-Ross Doyley	3 January 1990 (aged 19)			(Jamaica Football Federation) Portmore United
19	FW	Dever Orgill	8 March 1990 (aged 18)			(Canadian Soccer Association) Vancouver Whitecaps FC
20	DF	Brenton Griffiths	9 February 1991 (aged 18)			(Jamaica Football Federation) Portmore United
21	FW	Ricky Sappleton	8 December 1989 (aged 19)			(The Football Association) Leicester City

== Mexico ==
Coach: Juan Carlos Chávez (Mexico)

No.	Pos.	Player	Date of birth (age)	Caps	Goals	Club
1	GK	Miguel Ángel Centeno	August 16, 1989 (aged 19)			(Mexican Football Federation) Deportivo Toluca
2	DF	Néstor Vidrio	March 22, 1989 (aged 19)			(Mexican Football Federation) Atlas
3	DF	Oswaldo Alanis	March 18, 1989 (aged 19)			(Mexican Football Federation) Tecos UAG
4	DF	Christian Sánchez	April 4, 1989 (aged 19)			(Mexican Football Federation) Atlas
5	DF	Juan Antonio Ocampo	June 11, 1990 (aged 18)			(Mexican Football Federation) Guadalajara
6	DF	Daniel Montes	May 10, 1989 (aged 19)			(Mexican Football Federation) Guadalajara
7	MF	Arnhold Rivas	June 13, 1989 (aged 19)			(Mexican Football Federation) Tecos UAG
8	FW	Marco Fabián	July 21, 1989 (aged 19)			(Mexican Football Federation) Guadalajara
9	FW	Javier Cortés	July 20, 1989 (aged 19)			(Mexican Football Federation) Universidad Nacional
10	FW	Antonio Salazar	February 7, 1989 (aged 20)			(Mexican Football Federation) Guadalajara
11	FW	Julio Nava	December 29, 1989 (aged 19)			(Mexican Football Federation) Guadalajara
12	GK	Liborio Sánchez	October 9, 1989 (aged 19)			(Mexican Football Federation) Guadalajara
13	MF	David Cabrera	September 7, 1989 (aged 19)			(Mexican Football Federation) Universidad Nacional
14	FW	Néstor Calderón	February 14, 1989 (aged 20)			(Mexican Football Federation) Deportivo Toluca
15	FW	Axel Velázquez	May 23, 1990 (aged 18)			(Mexican Football Federation) Atlas
16	DF	Luis Fernando Silva	March 23, 1989 (aged 19)			(Mexican Football Federation) Monarcas Morelia
17	MF	Jesús Dueñas	March 16, 1989 (aged 19)			(Mexican Football Federation) Tigres de la UANL
18	DF	César Martínez	February 6, 1989 (aged 20)			(Mexican Football Federation) Monterrey
19	DF	Carlos Alberto Gutiérrez	February 3, 1990 (aged 19)			(Mexican Football Federation) Atlas
20	MF	Luis Pérez Martínez	March 15, 1989 (aged 19)			(Mexican Football Federation) Necaxa

== Trinidad & Tobago ==
Head coach: (Serbia) Zoran Vraneš

No.	Pos.	Player	Date of birth (age)	Caps	Goals	Club
1	GK	Glenroy Samuel	15 April 1990 (aged 18)			(Trinidad and Tobago Football Association) United Petrotrin
2	DF	Aubrey David	11 October 1990 (aged 18)			Unattached
3	DF	Curtis Gonzales	26 January 1989 (aged 20)			(Trinidad and Tobago Football Association) Defence Force
4	DF	Sheldon Bateau	29 January 1991 (aged 18)			(Trinidad and Tobago Football Association) San Juan Jabloteh
5	DF	Akeem Adams	13 April 1991 (aged 17)			(Trinidad and Tobago Football Association) W Connection FC
6	MF	Leston Paul	10 March 1990 (aged 18)			(Trinidad and Tobago Football Association) Cic College
7	FW	Kevin Molino	17 June 1990 (aged 18)			(Trinidad and Tobago Football Association) San Juan Jabloteh
8	MF	Sean de Silva	17 January 1990 (aged 19)			(Trinidad and Tobago Football Association) College of Charleston
9	MF	Juma Clarence	17 March 1989 (aged 19)			(Trinidad and Tobago Football Association) United Petrotrin
10	MF	Daniel Joseph	28 July 1990 (aged 18)			(Trinidad and Tobago Football Association) San Juan Jabloteh
11	FW	Trent Lougheed	12 August 1989 (aged 19)			(Trinidad and Tobago Football Association) United Petrotrin
12	DF	Robert Primus	10 November 1990 (aged 18)			(Trinidad and Tobago Football Association) San Juan Jabloteh
13	DF	Marvin Manswell	25 March 1989 (aged 19)			(Trinidad and Tobago Football Association) W Connection FC
14	MF	Jean Luc Rochford	10 November 1990 (aged 18)			(Trinidad and Tobago Football Association) Joe Public FC
15	DF	Uriah Bentick	5 February 1989 (aged 20)			(Trinidad and Tobago Football Association) Caledonia AIA
16	MF	Marcus Joseph	29 April 1991 (aged 17)			(Trinidad and Tobago Football Association) United Petrotrin
17	DF	Nicholas Walker	23 January 1990 (aged 19)			(Trinidad and Tobago Football Association) St. Anns Rangers
18	DF	Daneil Cyrus	15 December 1990 (aged 18)			Unattached
19	FW	Qian Grosvenor	28 April 1989 (aged 19)			(Trinidad and Tobago Football Association) St. Anthony’s College
21	GK	Andre Marchan	11 August 1990 (aged 18)			(Trinidad and Tobago Football Association) W Connection FC

== United States ==
The United States roster was announced by on February 23, 2009.

Coach: Thomas Rongen (Netherlands)

No.	Pos.	Player	Date of birth (age)	Caps	Goals	Club
1	GK	Sean Johnson	May 31, 1989 (aged 19)			(United States Soccer Federation) University of Central Florida
2	DF	Kyle Davies	April 11, 1989 (aged 19)			(The Football Association) Southampton
3	DF	Anthony Wallace	January 26, 1989 (aged 20)			(United States Soccer Federation) FC Dallas
4	DF	Sheanon Williams	March 17, 1990 (aged 18)			Unattached
5	DF	Aaron Maund	September 19, 1990 (aged 18)			(United States Soccer Federation) University of Notre Dame
6	DF	Amobi Okugo	March 13, 1991 (aged 17)			(United States Soccer Federation) San Juan Lightning Crew
7	MF	Danny Cruz	January 3, 1990 (aged 19)			(United States Soccer Federation) Houston Dynamo
8	MF	Jared Jeffrey	June 14, 1990 (aged 18)			(Royal Belgian Football Association) Club Brugge
9	FW	Peri Marošević	May 5, 1989 (aged 19)			(United States Soccer Federation) FC Dallas
10	MF	Dilly Duka	September 15, 1989 (aged 19)			(United States Soccer Federation) Rutgers University
11	DF	Jorge Flores	September 16, 1989 (aged 19)			(United States Soccer Federation) Chivas USA
12	MF	Bryan Arguez	January 13, 1989 (aged 20)			(German Football Association) Hertha BSC
13	FW	Tony Taylor	July 13, 1989 (aged 19)			(United States Soccer Federation) Jacksonville University
14	FW	Sam Garza	October 17, 1989 (aged 19)			(United States Soccer Federation) University of Denver
15	MF	Brian Ownby	July 16, 1990 (aged 18)			(United States Soccer Federation) University of Virginia
16	FW	Billy Schuler	April 27, 1990 (aged 18)			(United States Soccer Federation) University of North Carolina at Chapel Hill
18	GK	Josh Lambo	November 19, 1990 (aged 18)			(United States Soccer Federation) FC Dallas
22	DF	Gale Agbossoumonde	November 17, 1991 (aged 17)			Unattached
23	MF	Brek Shea	February 28, 1990 (aged 19)			(United States Soccer Federation) FC Dallas
24	GK	Brian Perk	July 21, 1989 (aged 19)			(United States Soccer Federation) University of California, Los Angeles
