= 2009 CONCACAF U-20 Championship qualifying =

The 2009 CONCACAF U-20 Championship qualifying tournament determined the Caribbean and Central American Under-20 association football national teams that would participate in the 2009 CONCACAF U-20 Championship, which itself will qualify national teams to the 2009 FIFA U-20 World Cup. Qualification began on 14 May 2008. The final round of qualification was a one-game playoff on 2 March 2009, between the runner-up from the Caribbean zone, St Vincent and the Grenadines, and the 3rd-place finisher from the Central American zone, Honduras. The three North American zone nations, Canada, Mexico, and the United States, as well as tournament hosts Trinidad and Tobago, were automatically entered into the final tournament without need for qualification.

== Caribbean zone ==
=== First round ===
The first round consisted of five groups of four teams. The five group winners and top four group runners-up from each group advanced to the second qualification round.

==== Group A ====
All Group A matches were hosted by Asociación de Fútbol de Cuba, the governing by for association football in Cuba. All matches were played at Estadio Pedro Marrero in Havana.

Team	Pld	W	D	L	GF	GA	GD	Pts
Haiti	3	3	0	0	9	0	+9	9
Dominican Republic	3	1	1	1	8	2	+6	4
Cuba	3	1	1	1	6	4	+2	4
Bahamas	3	0	0	3	0	17	−17	0

27 May 2008

Haiti	1 – 0	Dominican Republic
Ultegun 68'

Estadio Pedro Marrero, Havana
Attendance: 3,000
Referee: Rudolph Angela (Aruba)
27 May 2008

Cuba	5 – 0	Bahamas
Adrila 7'; Hernandez 15'; Palmero 31'; Garcia 54'; Cordoves 69'

Estadio Pedro Marrero, Havana
Attendance: 3,000
Referee: Kevin Morrison (Jamaica)

29 May 2008

Bahamas	0 – 5	Haiti
		Fritznel 6'; Ultegun 7', 11'; Herold 20', 28'

Estadio Pedro Marrero, Havana
Attendance: 500
Referee: Kevin Morrison (Jamaica)

29 May 2008

Cuba	1 – 1	Dominican Republic
Hernandez 34'		Leonardo 5'

Estadio Pedro Marrero, Havana
Attendance: 500
Referee: Kevin Thomas (Jamaica)

31 May 2008

Dominican Republic	7 – 0	Bahamas
Rodriguez 26', 56'; Frechilla 36'; Berroa 44'; Garcia 55'; Jimenez 67'; Sierra 77'

Estadio Pedro Marrero, Havana
Attendance: 2,000
Referee: Kevin Morrison (Jamaica)

31 May 2008

Cuba	0 – 3	Haiti
		Herold 25'; Valdo 40'; Ultegun 48'

Estadio Pedro Marrero, Havana
Attendance: 2,000
Referee: Rudolph Angela (Aruba)

==== Group B ====
All Group B matches were hosted by the Cayman Islands Football Association, the governing body for association football in the Cayman Islands, and were played at the Truman Bodden Sports Complex in George Town.

Team	Pld	W	D	L	GF	GA	GD	Pts
Jamaica	3	3	0	0	8	0	+8	9
Bermuda	3	1	1	1	2	5	−3	4
Puerto Rico	3	1	0	2	4	5	−1	3
Cayman Islands	3	0	1	2	2	6	−4	1

23 July 2008

Jamaica	1 – 0	Puerto Rico
Palmer 34'

Truman Bodden Stadium, George Town
Attendance: 1,500
Referee: Sandy Vásquez (Dominican Republic)

23 July 2008

Cayman Islands	0 – 0	Bermuda

Truman Bodden Stadium, George Town
Attendance: 1,500
Referee: Edouard Guidner (Haiti)

25 July 2008

Bermuda	0 – 4	Jamaica
		Adlam 22', 44'; Williams 49', 62'

Truman Bodden Stadium, George Town
Attendance: 2,000
Referee: Edouard Guidner (Haiti)

25 July 2008

Cayman Islands	2 – 3	Puerto Rico
Godet 28'; Tatum 70'		Cabrero 13'; Luna 29'; Pacheco 35'

Truman Bodden Stadium, George Town
Attendance: 2,000
Referee: Francisco Bautista (Dominican Republic)

27 July 2008

Puerto Rico	1 – 2	Bermuda
Cabrero 5'		Hollis 46'; Coke 86'

Truman Bodden Stadium, George Town
Attendance: 2,000
Referee: Edouard Guidner (Haiti)

27 July 2008

Cayman Islands	0 – 3	Jamaica
		Clennon 12', 24'; Adlam 76'

Truman Bodden Stadium, George Town
Attendance: 2,000
Referee: Sandy Vásquez (Dominican Republic)

==== Group C ====
All Group C matches were hosted by Arubaanse Voetbal Bond, the governing body for association football in Aruba. All matches were played at Trinidad Stadium in Oranjestad.

Team	Pld	W	D	L	GF	GA	GD	Pts
Saint Kitts and Nevis	3	2	1	0	8	4	+4	7
Aruba	3	1	1	1	5	5	0	4
Suriname	3	0	3	0	4	4	0	3
Dominica	3	0	1	2	2	6	−4	1

16 July 2008

Suriname	1 – 1	Dominica
Drenthe 12'	(Report)	Glenworth 90'

Trinidad Stadium, Oranjestad
Attendance: 500
Referee: Bryan Willet (Antigua and Barbuda)

16 July 2008

Aruba	2 – 3	Saint Kitts and Nevis
De L'Isle 19'; Grovell 70'	(Report)	Benjamin 3', 38'; Somersall 8'

Trinidad Stadium, Oranjestad
Attendance: 500
Referee: George Phillip (Grenada)

18 July 2008

Saint Kitts and Nevis	1 – 1	Suriname
Somersall 63'	(Report)	Loswijk 26'

Trinidad Stadium, Oranjestad
Attendance: 700
Referee: George Phillip (Grenada)

18 July 2008

Aruba	1 – 0	Dominica
Abdul 71'	(Report)

Trinidad Stadium, Oranjestad
Attendance: 700
Referee: Bryan Willet (Antigua and Barbuda)

20 July 2008

Dominica	1 – 4	Saint Kitts and Nevis
Kennedy 17'	(Report)	Somersall 10'; Benjamin 37', 42'; Hanley 90'

Trinidad Stadium, Oranjestad
Attendance: 800
Referee: Javier Jauregui (Antigua and Barbuda)

20 July 2008

Aruba	2 – 2	Suriname
Nuñez Jr. 66'; Abdul 75'	(Report)	Odang 21'; Loswijk 54'

Trinidad Stadium, Oranjestad
Attendance: 800
Referee: George Phillip (Grenada)

==== Group D ====
All Group D matches were hosted by the Grenada Football Association, the governing body for association football in Grenada. All matches were played at Tanteen Recreational Ground in St. George's.

Team	Pld	W	D	L	GF	GA	GD	Pts
Saint Vincent and the Grenadines	3	3	0	0	26	1	+25	9
Grenada	3	1	1	1	19	3	+16	4
Guyana	3	1	1	1	17	4	+13	4
British Virgin Islands	3	0	0	3	1	54	−53	0

14 May 2008

Guyana	1 – 2	Saint Vincent and the Grenadines
Camacho 69'	(Report)	Stewart 51', 80'

Tanteen Recreational Ground, St. George's
Referee: Goffrey Hospedales (Trinidad and Tobago)

14 May 2008

Grenada	17 – 0	British Virgin Islands
D. Daniel 2', 11', 39', 42', 45'; R. Daniel 5', 19', 37', 65', 85', 88', 90+', 90+'; C. Murray 24', 45', 81'; Q. Murray 33'	(Report)

Tanteen Recreational Ground, St. George's
Referee: Martin Charles (Dominica)

16 May 2008

Saint Vincent and the Grenadines	23 – 1	British Virgin Islands
Douglas 17'; Stewart 21', 26', 37', 41', 45'; Hamlet 29'; Samuel 45', 77', 85', 87'; Browne 46', 73', 66'; Richardson 48', 75', 89'; William 53', 68', 70', 72'; Balcombe 69', 83'	(Report)	Evans 89'

Tanteen Recreational Ground, St. George's
Attendance: 100
Referee: Martin Charles (Dominica)

16 May 2008

Grenada	2 – 2	Guyana
C. Murray 22'; R. Daniel 83'	(Report)	Beaton 48'; McLennon 69'

Tanteen Recreational Ground, St. George's
Attendance: 100
Referee: Neal Brizan (Trinidad and Tobago)

18 May 2008

British Virgin Islands	0 – 14	Guyana
	(Report)	Camacho 11'; Murray 14', 34', 69', 78', 88'; McKinnon 27'; Crandson 36', 52', 84'; McLennon 44', 51'; Primo 64'; 78' (o.g.)

Tanteen Recreational Ground, St. George's
Referee: Goffrey Hospedales (Trinidad and Tobago)

18 May 2008

Grenada	0 – 1	Saint Vincent and the Grenadines
	(Report)	Stewart 44'

Tanteen Recreational Ground, St. George's
Referee: Neal Brizan (Trinidad and Tobago)

==== Group E ====
All Group E matches were hosted by Nederlands Antilliaanse Voetbal Unie, the governing by for association football in the Netherlands Antilles. All matches were played at Stadion Ergilio Hato in Willemstad.

Team	Pld	W	D	L	GF	GA	GD	Pts
Antigua and Barbuda	3	3	0	0	24	0	+24	9
Netherlands Antilles	3	2	0	1	11	2	+9	6
Saint Martin	3	1	0	2	8	6	+2	3
Anguilla	3	0	0	3	0	30	−30	0

1 July 2008

Antigua and Barbuda	3 – 0	Saint Martin
Constant 27', 59'; Challenger 33'	(Report)

Stadion Ergilio Hato, Willemstad
Attendance: 200
Referee: Stanley Lancaster (Guyana)

1 July 2008

Netherlands Antilles	8 – 0	Anguilla
Bacuna 6', 76'; Jantji 12'; Rijna 30'; Constancia 32', 39'; Torbed 46'; Poppen 83'	(Report)

Stadion Ergilio Hato, Willemstad
Attendance: 200
Referee: Henry Kia (Suriname)

3 July 2008

Anguilla	0 – 7	Saint Martin
	(Report)	Fleming 31'; Bellechasse 42'; Merabli 45', 68'; Daniel 62'; Galvani 64', 76'

Stadion Ergilio Hato, Willemstad
Attendance: 300
Referee: Caswell Cambridge (Saint Vincent and the Grenadines)

3 July 2008

Netherlands Antilles	0 – 1	Antigua and Barbuda
	(Report)	Thomas 6'

Stadion Ergilio Hato, Willemstad
Attendance: 300
Referee: Stanley Lancaster (Guyana)

5 July 2008

Antigua and Barbuda	15 – 0	Anguilla
Hazlewood 2', 61', 64'; Challenger 17', 27', 46', 70', 82'; Constant 24', 37', 44'; Martin 83'; Thomas 87'; Gregory 89'; Roach 90+'	(Report)

Stadion Ergilio Hato, Willemstad
Attendance: 450
Referee: Stanley Lancaster (Guyana)

5 July 2008

Netherlands Antilles	3 – 1	Saint Martin
Bacuna 41'; Carmelita 75'; Trenidad 90'	(Report)	Fleming 46'

Stadion Ergilio Hato, Willemstad
Attendance: 450
Referee: Caswell Cambridge (Saint Vincent and the Grenadines)

=== Second round ===
The second round consists of three groups of three. The three group winners from each group as well as the best-performing runner-up will move on to the third and final round of the CFU region's qualification tournament.

==== Group F ====
All Group F matches were hosted by Federación Dominicana de Fútbol, the governing by for association football in the Dominican Republic. All matches were played at Estadio Félix Sánchez in Santo Domingo.

Team	Pld	W	D	L	GF	GA	GD	Pts
Haiti	2	2	0	0	4	0	+4	6
Dominican Republic	2	1	0	1	5	2	+3	3
Grenada	2	0	0	2	0	7	−7	0

31 October 2008

Dominican Republic	0 – 2	Haiti
	(Report)	Vorbe 11'; Exantus 88'

Estadio Félix Sánchez, Santo Domingo
Attendance: 1000
Referee: Martin Charles (Dominica)

2 November 2008

Grenada	0 – 2	Haiti
	(Report)	Vorbe 6', 50'

Estadio Félix Sánchez, Santo Domingo
Attendance: 1400
Referee: Ignatius Baptiste (Dominica)

3 November 2008

Dominican Republic	5 – 0	Grenada
Frechilla 1'; Rodriguez 30', 32', 54'; Berroa 38'	(Report)

Estadio Félix Sánchez, Santo Domingo
Attendance: 300
Referee: Martin Charles (Dominica)

==== Group G ====
All Group G matches were hosted by Nederlands Antilliaanse Voetbal Unie, the governing by for association football in the Netherlands Antilles. All matches were played at Stadion Ergilio Hato in Willemstad.

Team	Pld	W	D	L	GF	GA	GD	Pts
Saint Vincent and the Grenadines	2	1	1	0	1	0	+1	4
Netherlands Antilles	2	0	2	0	4	4	0	2
Saint Kitts and Nevis	2	0	1	1	4	5	−1	1

11 October 2008

Netherlands Antilles	4 – 4	Saint Kitts and Nevis
Thorbed 46'; Victoria 84'; Constancia 86', 90'	(Report)	Blanchette 5', 33'; Benjamin 25', 75'

Ergilio Hato Stadium, Willemstad
Attendance: 200
Referee: George Phillip (Grenada)

13 October 2008

Saint Kitts and Nevis	0 – 1	Saint Vincent and the Grenadines
	(Report)	Stewart 56'

Ergilio Hato Stadium, Willemstad
Attendance: 75
Referee: Otis James (Guyana)

15 October 2008

Netherlands Antilles	0 – 0	Saint Vincent and the Grenadines
	(Report)

Ergilio Hato Stadium, Willemstad
Attendance: 200
Referee: George Phillip (Grenada)

==== Group H ====
All Group H matches were hosted by Arubaanse Voetbal Bond, the governing by for association football in the Aruba. All matches were played at Trinidad Stadium in Oranjestad.

Team	Pld	W	D	L	GF	GA	GD	Pts
Jamaica	2	2	0	0	8	1	+7	6
Aruba	2	1	0	1	3	6	−3	3
Antigua and Barbuda	2	0	0	2	3	7	−4	0

18 November 2008

Aruba	3 – 2	Antigua and Barbuda
Santos de Gouveia 25'; Ignacio 35'; Nuñez Jr 38'	(Report)	Luke 36'; Constant 46'

Centro Deportivo Guillermo Trinidad, Oranjestad
Referee: Neal Brizan (Trinidad and Tobago)

20 November 2008

Jamaica	4 – 1	Antigua and Barbuda
Orgill 29'; Philogene 33' (o.g.); Campbell 42'; Thorpe 42'	(Report)	Constant 52'

Centro Deportivo Guillermo Trinidad, Oranjestad
Referee: Geoffrey Hospedales (Trinidad and Tobago)

22 November 2008

Aruba	0 – 4	Jamaica
	(Report)	Orgill 15', 25', 50', 57'

Centro Deportivo Guillermo Trinidad, Oranjestad
Referee: Neal Brizan (Trinidad and Tobago)

=== Third round ===
The final round of CFU qualification were hosted by, the governing body for association football in Saint Vincent and the Grenadines. The matches were played at Victoria Park in Kingstown, the capital of Saint Vincent and the Grenadines. The group winner, Jamaica, qualified for the tournament proper, and the runner up from the Caribbean region, St Vincent and the Grenadines, as group runner-up, earned the right to a one-game playoff with the 3rd-place finisher from the Central American region, Honduras, to determine the 8th and final qualifier for the tournament proper.

Team	Pld	W	D	L	GF	GA	GD	Pts
Jamaica	3	2	1	0	7	2	+5	7
Saint Vincent and the Grenadines	3	2	0	1	3	2	+1	6
Haiti	3	1	1	1	7	3	+4	4
Dominican Republic	3	0	0	3	2	12	−10	0

9 January 2009
18:00 (UTC-4)

Jamaica	1 – 1	Haiti
Orgill 55'	(Report)	Fritznel 88'

Victoria Park, Kingstown
Attendance: 800
Referee: Enrico Wijngaarde (Suriname)
9 January 2009
20:00 (UTC-4)

Saint Vincent and the Grenadines	2 – 0	Dominican Republic
Cuffy 16'; Hamlet 56'	(Report)

Victoria Park, Kingstown
Attendance: 3,500
Referee: Enrico Wijngaarde (Suriname)

11 January 2009
18:00 (UTC-4)

Dominican Republic	1 – 4	Jamaica
Ledesma 86' (pen.)	(Report)	Adlam 11', 18', 42' (pen.); Campbell 42'

Victoria Park, Kingstown
Attendance: 2,000
Referee: George Phillip (Grenada)
11 January 2009
20:00 (UTC-4)

Saint Vincent and the Grenadines	1 – 0	Haiti
Stewart 47'	(Report)

Victoria Park, Kingstown
Attendance: 3,000
Referee: Stanley Lancaster (Guyana)

13 January 2009
18:00 (UTC-4)

Haiti	6 – 1	Dominican Republic
Jérôme 22'; Gregory 31'; Fritznel 37'; Exantus 55'; Vaniel 78'; Ultegun 89'	(Report)	Frechilla 11'

Victoria Park, Kingstown
Attendance: 2,000
Referee: Enrico Wijngaarde (Suriname)
13 January 2009
20:00 (UTC-4)

Saint Vincent and the Grenadines	0 – 2	Jamaica
	(Report)	Stapleton 13' (o.g.); Williams 60'

Victoria Park, Kingstown
Attendance: 4,000
Referee: Geoffrey Hospedales (Trinidad and Tobago)

== Central American zone ==
The Central American zone comprises two groups. One group has three teams and the other has four teams. The two group winners will move on to the tournament. The runner-up from each group will play a two-legged playoff to determine the third place team from the region. The third place team will play the runner-up from the Caribbean region for the final spot in the tournament proper.

=== Group 1 ===
The matches played in Group 1 were hosted by Federación Nacional Autónoma de Fútbol de Honduras, the governing body for association football in Honduras. All matches were played at Estadio Tiburcio Carías Andino in Tegucigalpa, the capital city of Honduras.

Team	Pld	W	D	L	GF	GA	GD	PTS
Costa Rica	2	2	0	0	6	1	+5	6
Honduras	2	1	0	1	8	2	+6	3
Nicaragua	2	0	0	2	0	11	−11	0

17 September 2008

Costa Rica	4 – 0	Nicaragua
Estrada 2'; Castro 34'; Guzman 65'; Ureña 74'	(Report)

Estadio Tiburcio Carías Andino, Tegucigalpa
Attendance: 100
Referee: Gerald Henry (Belize)

19 September 2008

Honduras	7 – 0	Nicaragua
Rojas 39', 57', 90+1'; Mejia 44'; Sosa 45', 52'; Martínez 88'	(Report)

Estadio Tiburcio Carías Andino, Tegucigalpa
Attendance: 1,800
Referee: Jose Rivera (El Salvador)

21 September 2008

Honduras	1 – 2	Costa Rica
Martínez 60'	(Report)	Martínez 29'; Estrada 43'

Estadio Tiburcio Carías Andino, Tegucigalpa
Attendance: 4,200
Referee: Walter López (Guatemala)

=== Group 2 ===
All of the matches in Group 2 were hosted by Federación Nacional de Fútbol de Guatemala, the governing body for association football in Guatemala. All matches were played at Estadio Mateo Flores in Guatemala City.

Team	Pld	W	D	L	GF	GA	GD	PTS
El Salvador	3	2	0	1	6	3	+3	6
Panama	3	2	0	1	6	3	+3	6
Guatemala	3	1	1	1	4	4	0	4
Belize	3	0	1	2	1	7	−6	1

23 September 2008

Panama	3 – 0	Belize
Beltran 44' de la Rosa 57', 81'	(Report)

Estadio Mateo Flores, Guatemala City
Attendance: 1,000
Referee: Rene Guerrero (Nicaragua)
23 September 2008

Guatemala	2 – 1	El Salvador
Herrarte 1'; Gomez 26'	(Report)	Morán 75'

Estadio Mateo Flores, Guatemala City
Attendance: 1,000
Referee: Hugo Cruz (Costa Rica)

25 September 2008

El Salvador	2 – 1	Panama
Blanco 28'; Maldonado 90'	(Report)	Rob. Blackburn 48'

Estadio Mateo Flores, Guatemala City
Attendance: 100
Referee: Ricardo Cerdas (Costa Rica)
25 September 2008

Guatemala	1 – 1	Belize
Morales 9'	(Report)	Maldonado 45'

Estadio Mateo Flores, Guatemala City
Attendance: 800
Referee: Óscar Moncada (Honduras)

27 September 2008

Belize	0 – 3	El Salvador
	(Report)	Blanco 6', 30'; Orellana 32'

Estadio Mateo Flores, Guatemala City
Attendance: 300
Referee: Óscar Moncada (Honduras)
27 September 2008

Guatemala	1 – 2	Panama
Cayax 73'	(Report)	Mena 39'; Rol. Blackburn 90'

Estadio Mateo Flores, Guatemala City
Attendance: 1,500
Referee: Hugo Cruz (Costa Rica)

=== Playoff ===
The two group runners-up faced off in a two-legged playoff for third place rights in the region. Honduras, as winners of the 3rd place playoff, advanced to face the runner up from the Caribbean qualification, Saint Vincent and the Grenadines, to become the 8th and final qualifier for the tournament proper.

3 October 2008

Honduras	5 – 2	Panama
Padilla 10'; Valladares 14'; Rojas 37'; Martínez 51'; Andino 75'	(Report)	de la Rosa 31', 86'

Estadio Carlos Miranda, Comayagua
Attendance: 1267
Referee: Edgar Rodriguez (Costa Rica)

5 October 2008

Panama	1 – 2	Honduras
Rol. Blackburn 26'	(Report)	Rojas 57', 73'

Estadio Rod Carew, Panama City
Attendance: 1267
Referee: Walter Lopez (Guatemala)

== Caribbean/Central American playoff ==
Honduras, as winner of the 3rd place playoff in Central American qualification, faced Saint Vincent and the Grenadines, the runner-up from the Caribbean zone tournament, for the final place in the tournament proper. The match was a one-game playoff on 2 March in Macoya, Trinidad four days prior to the opening of the tournament proper.

2 March 2009
16:00 (UTC-4)

Honduras	3 – 1	Saint Vincent and the Grenadines
Rojas 74'; Martínez 80'; Andino 89'	(Report)	Stewart 23' (pen.)

Marvin Lee Stadium, Macoya
Attendance: 100
Referee: Neal Brizan (Trinidad and Tobago)
