= 2009 CONCACAF U-20 Championship =

Under-20 national football tournament

Tournament details
- Host country: Trinidad and Tobago
- Cities: Bacolet and Macoya
- Dates: 6–15 March
- Teams: 8 (from 1 confederation)
- Venues: 2 (in 2 host cities)

Final positions
- Champions: Costa Rica (2nd title)
- Runners-up: United States
- Third place: Honduras
- Fourth place: Trinidad and Tobago

Tournament statistics
- Matches played: 16
- Goals scored: 33 (2.06 per match)
- Top scorer(s): (Canada) Randy Edwini-Bonsu (Costa Rica) Josué Martínez (Honduras) Roger Rojas (3 goals each)

The 2009 CONCACAF U-20 Championship was the biannual CONCACAF youth championship tournament for under-20 national teams. The 2009 edition was held in Trinidad and Tobago. All matches were played at Dwight Yorke Stadium in Bacolet, Tobago and Marvin Lee Stadium in Macoya, Trinidad. The CONCACAF U-20 Championship traditionally serves as the CONCACAF qualifier for the FIFA U-20 World Cup, and under the 2009 tournament format the four semifinalists qualified for the 2009 FIFA U-20 World Cup, which was hosted by Egypt from 25 September to 16 October 2009.

== Qualifying ==
| Region | Qualification Tournament | Qualifiers |
|---|---|---|
| Caribbean (CFU) | Caribbean U-20 qualifying tournament | Jamaica; Trinidad and Tobago† |
| Central America (UNCAF) | Central American U-20 qualifying tournament | Costa Rica; El Salvador; Honduras‡ |
| North America (NAFU) | Automatically qualified | Canada; Mexico; United States |

Notes

- † Trinidad and Tobago automatically qualified and did not participate in the qualification tournament due to their status as tournament hosts.
- ‡ The runner up from the Caribbean region, Saint Vincent and the Grenadines, and the 3rd-place finisher from the Central American region, Honduras, played a playoff to determine the 8th and final qualifier for the tournament proper. The match was a one-game playoff on 2 March, four days prior to the opening of the tournament, in Macoya. Honduras won the match 3–1.

== Venues ==
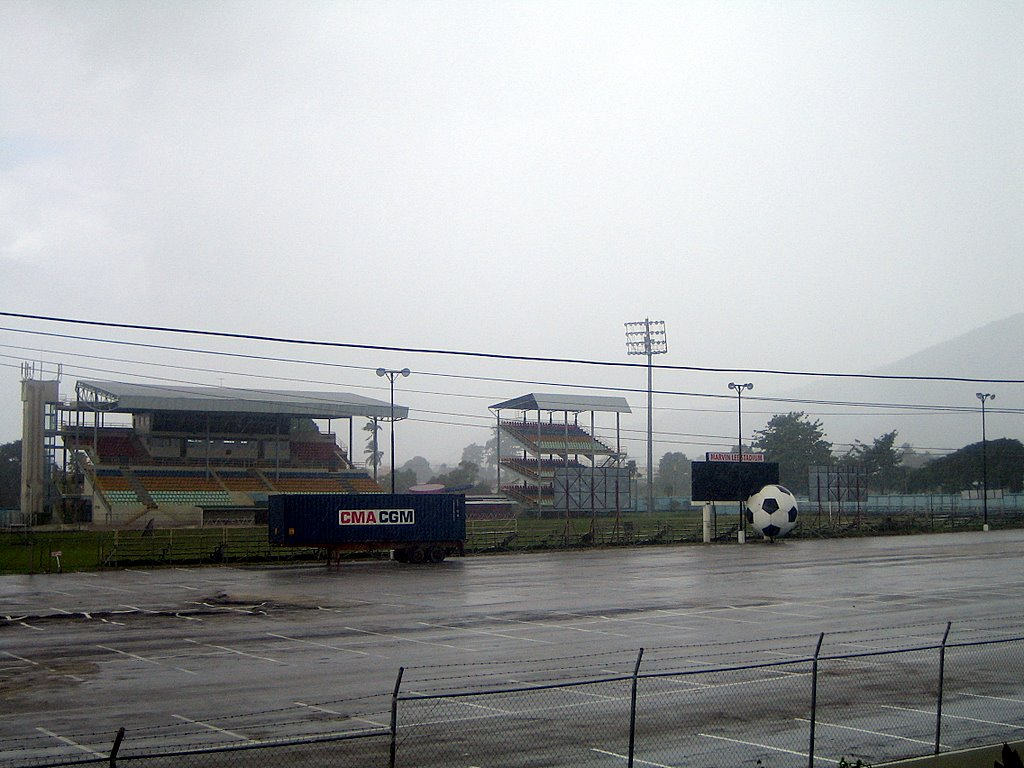
| Dwight Yorke Stadium; Location:Bacolet, Tobago; Capacity:7,500; Home club: Tobago United | Marvin Lee Stadium; Location:Macoya, Trinidad; Capacity:6,000; Home club: Joe Public F.C. |

== Group stage ==
The winner and runner-up from each group advanced to the semifinals.

=== Group 1 ===
All matches in this group were played at Dwight Yorke Stadium in Bacolet, Trinidad.

| Team | Pld | W | D | L | GF | GA | GD | Pts |
|---|---|---|---|---|---|---|---|---|
| United States | 3 | 2 | 1 | 0 | 5 | 0 | +5 | 7 |
| Honduras | 3 | 1 | 2 | 0 | 6 | 2 | +4 | 5 |
| Jamaica | 3 | 1 | 0 | 2 | 2 | 8 | −6 | 3 |
| El Salvador | 3 | 0 | 1 | 2 | 3 | 6 | −3 | 1 |

6 March 2009
17:00 ECT

| Honduras | 2–2 | El Salvador |
|---|---|---|
| Rojas 65'; Valladares 82' | Report | Blanco 77'; Flores 90' |

Dwight Yorke Stadium, Bacolet
Attendance: 556
Referee: Roberto García (Mexico)
6 March 2009
19:00 ECT

| Jamaica | 0–3 | United States |
|---|---|---|
| | Report | Marošević 8'; Duka 78'; Schuler 83' |

Dwight Yorke Stadium, Bacolet
Attendance: 556
Referee: Ricardo Cerdas (Costa Rica)

8 March 2009
16:00 ECT

| El Salvador | 1–2 | Jamaica |
|---|---|---|
| Sosa 11' | Report | Campbell 8'; Adlam 56' |

Dwight Yorke Stadium, Bacolet
Attendance: 524
Referee: Paul Ward (Canada)
8 March 2009
18:00 ECT

| United States | 0–0 | Honduras |
|---|---|---|
| | Report |

Dwight Yorke Stadium, Bacolet
Attendance: 524
Referee: Geoffrey Hospedales (Trinidad and Tobago)

10 March 2009
17:00 ECT

| Jamaica | 0–4 | Honduras |
|---|---|---|
| | Report | Leveron 44'; Martínez 47'; Rojas 62'; Altimirano 72' |

Dwight Yorke Stadium, Bacolet
Attendance: 467
Referee: Geoffrey Hospedales (Trinidad and Tobago)
10 March 2009
19:00 ECT

| United States | 2–0 | El Salvador |
|---|---|---|
| Shea 30'; Taylor 41' | Report |

Dwight Yorke Stadium, Bacolet
Attendance: 467
Referee: Rene Guerrero (Nicaragua)

=== Group 2 ===
All matches in this group were played at Marvin Lee Stadium in Macoya, Tobago.

| Team | Pld | W | D | L | GF | GA | GD | Pts |
|---|---|---|---|---|---|---|---|---|
| Costa Rica | 3 | 2 | 1 | 0 | 3 | 1 | +2 | 7 |
| Trinidad and Tobago | 3 | 1 | 2 | 0 | 3 | 2 | +1 | 5 |
| Canada | 3 | 1 | 0 | 2 | 3 | 3 | 0 | 3 |
| Mexico | 3 | 0 | 1 | 2 | 2 | 5 | −3 | 1 |

7 March 2009
16:00 ECT

| Mexico | 0–1 | Costa Rica |
|---|---|---|
| | Report | Martínez 39' |

Marvin Lee Stadium, Macoya
Attendance: 4,000
Referee: Walter López (Guatemala)
7 March 2009
18:00 ECT

| Trinidad and Tobago | 1–0 | Canada |
|---|---|---|
| De Silva 82' | Report |

Marvin Lee Stadium, Macoya
Attendance: 4,000
Referee: Óscar Moncada (Honduras)

9 March 2009
17:00 ECT

| Canada | 2–0 | Mexico |
|---|---|---|
| Edwini-Bonsu 75', 82' | Report |

Marvin Lee Stadium, Macoya
Attendance: 4,000
Referee: Elmer Bonilla (El Salvador)
9 March 2009
19:00 ECT

| Trinidad and Tobago | 0–0 | Costa Rica |
|---|---|---|
| | Report |

Marvin Lee Stadium, Macoya
Attendance: 4,000
Referee: Ricardo Salazar (United States)

11 March 2009
17:00 ECT

| Costa Rica | 2–1 | Canada |
|---|---|---|
| Castro 25'; Ureña 72' | Report | Edwini-Bonsu 12' |

Marvin Lee Stadium, Macoya
Attendance: 5,000
Referee: Kevin Thomas (Jamaica)
11 March 2009
19:00 ECT

| Trinidad and Tobago | 2–2 | Mexico |
|---|---|---|
| Clarence 52'; Bentick 60' | Report | Velasquez 8'; Salazar 45' |

Marvin Lee Stadium, Macoya
Attendance: 5,000
Referee: Óscar Moncada (Honduras)

== Championship round ==
All four teams to qualify for the semifinals automatically qualified for the 2009 FIFA U-20 World Cup.

=== Semifinals ===
13 March 2009
17:00 ECT

| Costa Rica | 0–0 (a.e.t.) | Honduras |
|---|---|---|
| | Report |
Penalties
| Estrada (penalty scored); Guzmán (penalty scored); Gamboa (penalty scored); Castro (penalty scored) | 4–2 | (penalty scored) Leverón; (penalty missed) Mejía; (penalty missed) Mayorquín; (penalty scored) Fonseca |

Marvin Lee Stadium, Macoya
Attendance: 4,500
Referee: Walter López (Guatemala)

13 March 2009
20:00 ECT

| United States | 0–0 (a.e.t.) | Trinidad and Tobago |
|---|---|---|
| | Report |
Penalties
| Jeffrey (penalty scored); Duka (penalty scored); Marošević (penalty missed); Davies (penalty scored); Wallace (penalty scored) | 4–3 | (penalty scored) Rochford; (penalty scored) Joseph; (penalty scored) Bentick; (penalty missed) Bateau; (penalty missed) Paul |

Marvin Lee Stadium, Macoya
Attendance: 4,500
Referee: Roberto García (Mexico)

=== Third place ===
15 March 2009
16:00 ECT

| Honduras | 2–1 | Trinidad and Tobago |
|---|---|---|
| Rojas 47'; Mayorquín 89' | Report | Grosvenor 58' |

Marvin Lee Stadium, Macoya
Attendance: 2,500
Referee: Elmer Bonilla (El Salvador)

=== Final ===
15 March 2009
19:00 ECT

| Costa Rica | 3–0 | United States |
|---|---|---|
| Estrada 40'; Martínez 68', 80' | Report |

Marvin Lee Stadium, Macoya
Attendance: 2,500
Referee: Geoffrey Hospedales (Trinidad and Tobago)

== Goalscorers ==
3 goals

- (Canada) Randy Edwini-Bonsu
- (Costa Rica) Josué Martínez
- (Honduras) Roger Rojas

1 goal

- (Costa Rica) Jorge Castro
- (Costa Rica) Diego Estrada
- (Costa Rica) Marco Ureña
- (El Salvador) Léster Blanco
- (El Salvador) Andrés Flores
- (El Salvador) Herbert Sosa
- (Honduras) Cristhian Altimirano
- (Honduras) Johnny Leverón
- (Honduras) Mario Martínez
- (Honduras) José Valladares
- (Honduras) Reinieri Mayorquín
- (Jamaica) Alonso Adlam
- (Jamaica) Romario Campbell
- (Mexico) Antonio Salazar
- (Mexico) Axel Velasquez
- (Trinidad and Tobago) Juma Clarence
- (Trinidad and Tobago) Sean De Silva
- (Trinidad and Tobago) Qian Grosvenor
- (Trinidad and Tobago) Uriah Bentick
- (United States) Dilly Duka
- (United States) Perica Marošević
- (United States) Billy Schuler
- (United States) Brek Shea
- (United States) Tony Taylor

== Final ranking ==
| Pos | Team | Pld | W | D | L | GF | GA | GD | Pts | Final result |
|---|---|---|---|---|---|---|---|---|---|---|
| 1 | Costa Rica | 5 | 3 | 2 | 0 | 6 | 1 | +5 | 11 | Champions |
| 2 | United States | 5 | 2 | 2 | 1 | 5 | 3 | +2 | 8 | Runners-up |
| 3 | Honduras | 5 | 2 | 3 | 0 | 8 | 3 | +5 | 9 | Third place |
| 4 | Trinidad and Tobago (H) | 5 | 1 | 3 | 1 | 4 | 4 | 0 | 6 | Fourth Place |
| 5 | Canada | 3 | 1 | 0 | 2 | 3 | 3 | 0 | 3 | Eliminated in Group stage |
| 6 | Jamaica | 3 | 1 | 0 | 2 | 2 | 8 | −6 | 3 | Eliminated in Group stage |
| 7 | El Salvador | 3 | 0 | 1 | 2 | 3 | 6 | −3 | 1 | Eliminated in Group stage |
| 8 | Mexico | 3 | 0 | 1 | 2 | 2 | 5 | −3 | 1 | Eliminated in Group stage |

Source: rsssf.com
(H) Hosts

Note: Per statistical convention in football, matches decided in extra time are counted as wins and losses, while matches decided by penalty shoot-out are counted as draws.

== See also ==
- CONCACAF Under-20 Championship
- 2009 FIFA U-20 World Cup
