= 2007 CONCACAF U-17 Tournament squads =

List of squads at 2007 CONCACAF U-17 Tournament

== Group A ==
=== El Salvador ===
Coach: Norberto Huezo

No.	Pos.	Player	Date of birth (age)	Caps	Goals	Club
1	GK	Diego Cuellar	10 August 1990 (aged 16)			(Salvadoran Football Federation) FSF
2	DF	César López	27 July 1990 (aged 16)			(Salvadoran Football Federation) FSF
3	DF	Andrés Menéndez	9 February 1990 (aged 17)			(Salvadoran Football Federation) FSF
4	DF	Moisés García	26 June 1990 (aged 16)			(Salvadoran Football Federation) FSF
5	MF	Alex Mendoza	6 April 1990 (aged 16)			(Salvadoran Football Federation) FSF
6	DF	Christian Valencia	3 January 1990 (aged 17)			(Salvadoran Football Federation) FSF
7	DF	Henry Escobar	23 May 1990 (aged 16)			(Salvadoran Football Federation) ADFA San Salvador
8	MF	Diego Chavarría	28 February 1990 (aged 17)			(Salvadoran Football Federation) FSF
9	FW	Andrés Flores	31 August 1990 (aged 16)			(Salvadoran Football Federation) FSF
10	MF	William Maldonado	3 January 1990 (aged 17)			(Salvadoran Football Federation) Academia Chelona
11	FW	Ricardo Orellana	26 August 1990 (aged 16)			(Salvadoran Football Federation) Academia Chelona
12	MF	Luis Quintanilla	25 December 1990 (aged 16)			(Salvadoran Football Federation) FSF
13	FW	Oscar Rivera	9 July 1990 (aged 16)			(Salvadoran Football Federation) FSF
14	MF	Herbert Sosa	11 January 1990 (aged 17)			(Salvadoran Football Federation) Chalatenango
15	MF	Fabricio Alfaro	3 December 1990 (aged 16)			(Salvadoran Football Federation) San Salvador
16	FW	William Chicas	11 October 1990 (aged 16)			(Salvadoran Football Federation) FSF
17	MF	Gilberto Baires	1 April 1990 (aged 17)			(Salvadoran Football Federation) FSF
20	DF	Mauricio Avalos	5 November 1990 (aged 16)			(Salvadoran Football Federation) FSF
21	FW	Luis Martínez	13 June 1990 (aged 16)			(Salvadoran Football Federation) FSF
25	GK	Oscar Arroyo	28 January 1990 (aged 17)			(Salvadoran Football Federation) San Salvador

=== Haiti ===
Coach: Jean Labase

No.	Pos.	Player	Date of birth (age)	Caps	Goals	Club
1	GK	Junior Guillaume	20 January 1991 (aged 16)			(Haitian Football Federation) FHF
2	DF	Mechack Jerome	21 April 1990 (aged 16)			(Haitian Football Federation) FHF
3	DF	Shrioc Baptiste	3 October 1990 (aged 16)			(Haitian Football Federation) FHF
4	DF	Peterson Desriviere	19 October 1990 (aged 16)			(Haitian Football Federation) FHF
5	DF	Pierre Elusma	3 May 1990 (aged 16)			(Haitian Football Federation) FHF
6	MF	Widner Saint-Cyr	18 November 1990 (aged 16)			(Haitian Football Federation) FHF
7	MF	Ricky Merisier	2 August 1990 (aged 16)			(Haitian Football Federation) FHF
8	MF	Bitielo Jacques	28 December 1990 (aged 16)			(Haitian Football Federation) FHF
9	FW	Ulterguens St. Victor	6 June 1991 (aged 15)			(Haitian Football Federation) FHF
10	FW	Wiselet Saint Louis	10 September 1992 (aged 14)			(Haitian Football Federation) FHF
11	MF	Normil Valdo	19 December 1990 (aged 16)			(Haitian Football Federation) FHF
12	MF	Samuel Alcine	20 May 1990 (aged 16)			(Haitian Football Federation) FHF
13	FW	Fabien Vorbe	4 January 1990 (aged 17)			(Haitian Football Federation) FHF
14	MF	Joseph Peterson	24 April 1990 (aged 16)			(Haitian Football Federation) FHF
15	MF	Herold Charles	23 July 1990 (aged 16)			(Haitian Football Federation) FHF
16	DF	John Romulus	26 September 1990 (aged 16)			(Haitian Football Federation) FHF
17	MF	Guemsly Joseph	3 January 1990 (aged 17)			(Haitian Football Federation) FHF
20	GK	Shelson Dorleans	15 October 1990 (aged 16)			(Haitian Football Federation) FHF

=== Honduras ===
Coach: Miguel Escalante

No.	Pos.	Player	Date of birth (age)	Caps	Goals	Club
3	DF	Angel Castro	8 September 1990 (aged 16)			(National Autonomous Federation of Football of Honduras) Olimpia
4	DF	Fredy Escobar	18 April 1990 (aged 16)			(National Autonomous Federation of Football of Honduras) Platense
5	DF	José Fonseca	27 May 1990 (aged 16)			(National Autonomous Federation of Football of Honduras) Olimpia
6	DF	Kevin Castro	22 August 1990 (aged 16)			(National Autonomous Federation of Football of Honduras) Olimpia
7	FW	Alexander Rivera	28 June 1990 (aged 16)			(National Autonomous Federation of Football of Honduras) Liberty University
8	MF	Orlin Peralta	12 February 1990 (aged 17)			(National Autonomous Federation of Football of Honduras) Vida
9	FW	Fredy Sosa	30 January 1990 (aged 17)			(National Autonomous Federation of Football of Honduras) Olimpia
10	FW	Christian Samir Martínez	8 September 1990 (aged 16)			(National Autonomous Federation of Football of Honduras) Victoria
11	FW	Roger Rojas	9 June 1990 (aged 16)			(National Autonomous Federation of Football of Honduras) Olimpia
13	DF	Oscar Urbina	13 August 1990 (aged 16)			(National Autonomous Federation of Football of Honduras) Promesas
14	MF	Erick Zepeda	20 June 1990 (aged 16)			(National Autonomous Federation of Football of Honduras) Marathón
15	MF	Ronald Martínez	26 July 1990 (aged 16)			(National Autonomous Federation of Football of Honduras) Motagua
16	DF	Johnny Leverón	7 February 1990 (aged 17)			(National Autonomous Federation of Football of Honduras) Promesas
17	MF	Luis Garrido	5 November 1990 (aged 16)			(National Autonomous Federation of Football of Honduras) Juticalpa
19	MF	Carlos Castellanos	9 January 1990 (aged 17)			(National Autonomous Federation of Football of Honduras) Marathón
20	MF	Alfredo Mejía	3 April 1990 (aged 17)			(National Autonomous Federation of Football of Honduras) Real España
21	FW	Carlos Cruz	2 November 1990 (aged 16)			(National Autonomous Federation of Football of Honduras) Motagua
22	GK	Oscar López	7 March 1990 (aged 17)			No club
24	MF	Julio Ocampo	12 February 1990 (aged 17)			(National Autonomous Federation of Football of Honduras) Victoria
25	GK	Marlon Licona	9 February 1991 (aged 16)			(National Autonomous Federation of Football of Honduras) Motagua

=== Mexico ===
Coach: Jesús Ramírez

No.	Pos.	Player	Date of birth (age)	Caps	Goals	Club
1	GK	Alfredo Saldivar	9 February 1990 (aged 17)			(Mexican Football Federation) Universidad
2	DF	Christian Pérez	27 March 1990 (aged 17)			(Mexican Football Federation) Guadalajara
3	FW	Kristian Alvarez	20 April 1992 (aged 14)			(Mexican Football Federation) Guadalajara
4	DF	Daniel Cervantes	28 June 1990 (aged 16)			(Mexican Football Federation) Necaxa
5	DF	Carlos Gutiérrez	3 February 1990 (aged 17)			(Mexican Football Federation) Atlas
6	MF	José Aceves	8 January 1991 (aged 16)			(Mexican Football Federation) Guadalajara
7	MF	Andrés Rodríguez	23 March 1990 (aged 17)			(Mexican Football Federation) América
8	MF	Alberto Soto	18 January 1990 (aged 17)			(Mexican Football Federation) Santos Laguna
9	FW	Raúl Nava	17 September 1990 (aged 16)			(Mexican Football Federation) Toluca
10	FW	Ulises Dávila	13 April 1991 (aged 15)			(Mexican Football Federation) Guadalajara
11	FW	Jesús Cuevas	26 June 1990 (aged 16)			(Mexican Football Federation) Morelia
12	GK	Hugo González	1 August 1990 (aged 16)			(Mexican Football Federation) América
13	FW	Christian Morán	4 July 1990 (aged 16)			(Mexican Football Federation) Guadalajara
14	DF	Heriberto Olvera	13 May 1990 (aged 16)			(Mexican Football Federation) Pachuca
15	FW	Francisco Farias	14 August 1990 (aged 16)			(Mexican Football Federation) Morelia
16	FW	José Verduzco	17 January 1990 (aged 17)			(Mexican Football Federation) Guadalajara
17	FW	Isaác Brizuela	28 August 1990 (aged 16)			(Mexican Football Federation) Toluca
18	FW	Edgar Pacheco	22 January 1990 (aged 17)			(Mexican Football Federation) Atlas
19	FW	César Moreno	4 February 1990 (aged 17)			(Mexican Football Federation) Guadalajara
20	FW	Ervín Trejo	3 June 1990 (aged 16)			(Mexican Football Federation) Toluca

== Group B ==
=== Canada ===
Coach: Stephen Hart

No.	Pos.	Player	Date of birth (age)	Caps	Goals	Club
1	GK	Adam Street	7 July 1991 (aged 15)			(The Football Association) West Ham United
2	DF	Greg Smith	7 March 1990 (aged 17)			(Canadian Soccer Association) Canada NTC
3	DF	Daniel Tannous	13 April 1990 (aged 16)			(Canadian Soccer Association) Ontario NTC
4	DF	Olivier Lacoste-Lebuis	28 August 1990 (aged 16)			(French Football Federation) Strasbourg
5	DF	Adam Straith	11 September 1990 (aged 16)			(Canadian Soccer Association) Vancouver Whitecaps
6	MF	Philippe Davies	12 December 1990 (aged 16)			(Canadian Soccer Association) Quebec NTC
7	MF	Marcus Johnstone	27 March 1990 (aged 17)			(Canadian Soccer Association) Alberta NTC
8	MF	Devin Gunenc	11 February 1990 (aged 17)			(Canadian Soccer Association) British Columbia NTC
9	FW	Jarek Whiteman	28 June 1990 (aged 16)			(Canadian Soccer Association) Ontario NTC
10	FW	Randy Edwini-Bonsu	20 April 1990 (aged 16)			(French Football Federation) Metz
11	MF	Kyle Porter	19 January 1990 (aged 17)			(Canadian Soccer Association) Ontario NTC
12	MF	Alex Semenets	10 March 1990 (aged 17)			(Canadian Soccer Association) Ontario NTC
13	MF	William Hyde	25 October 1990 (aged 16)			(Canadian Soccer Association) Ontario NTC
14	MF	Mohamed Sylla	14 April 1990 (aged 16)			(Canadian Soccer Association) Quebec NTC
15	FW	Gagan Dosanjh	1 November 1990 (aged 16)			None
16	MF	Colin Parenteau-Michon	15 July 1990 (aged 16)			(Canadian Soccer Association) Quebec NTC
17	MF	Cedric Carrie	16 August 1990 (aged 16)			(Canadian Soccer Association) Quebec NTC
18	DF	Drew Beckie	30 September 1990 (aged 16)			(United States Soccer Federation) Real Colorado
20	GK	Julien Latendresse-Levesque	27 February 1991 (aged 16)			(Canadian Soccer Association) Quebec NTC
21	DF	Erick Leal	23 August 1990 (aged 16)			(Canadian Soccer Association) Ontario NTC

=== Costa Rica ===
Coach: Manuel Ubeña

No.	Pos.	Player	Date of birth (age)	Caps	Goals	Club
1	GK	Leonel Moreira	2 April 1990 (aged 17)			(Costa Rican Football Federation) Herediano
2	DF	Seemore Johnson	29 October 1991 (aged 15)			(Costa Rican Football Federation) Alajuelense
3	DF	Roy Smith	19 April 1990 (aged 16)			(Costa Rican Football Federation) Brujas
4	DF	Jordan Smith	23 April 1991 (aged 15)			(Costa Rican Football Federation) Saprissa
5	MF	Esteban Luna	5 January 1990 (aged 17)			(Costa Rican Football Federation) Saprissa
6	MF	Miguel Brenes	31 May 1990 (aged 16)			(Costa Rican Football Federation) Alajuelense
7	MF	Diego Brenes	24 August 1990 (aged 16)			(Costa Rican Football Federation) Alajuelense
8	MF	David Guzmán	18 February 1990 (aged 17)			(Costa Rican Football Federation) Saprissa
9	FW	Marco Ureña	5 March 1990 (aged 17)			(Costa Rican Football Federation) Alajuelense
10	FW	Jorge Castro	11 September 1990 (aged 16)			(Costa Rican Football Federation) Saprissa
11	MF	Jessy Peralta	22 July 1990 (aged 16)			(Costa Rican Football Federation) Saprissa
12	MF	Bruno Castro	6 August 1990 (aged 16)			(Costa Rican Football Federation) Herediano
13	DF	Erick Rojas	3 February 1990 (aged 17)			(Costa Rican Football Federation) Alajuelense
14	MF	Bryan Oviedo	18 February 1990 (aged 17)			(Costa Rican Football Federation) Saprissa
15	DF	Rodrigo Herra	20 October 1990 (aged 16)			(Costa Rican Football Federation) Saprissa
16	FW	Julio Ibarra	6 January 1990 (aged 17)			(Costa Rican Football Federation) Alajuelense
17	FW	Josué Martínez	25 March 1990 (aged 17)			(Costa Rican Football Federation) Saprissa
18	GK	Guillermo Camacho	25 April 1990 (aged 16)			(Costa Rican Football Federation) San Carlos
19	MF	Daniel Varela	30 April 1990 (aged 16)			(Costa Rican Football Federation) Alfaro Ruiz
23	GK	Stanley Jiménez	13 February 1990 (aged 17)			(Costa Rican Football Federation) San Ramón

=== Jamaica ===
Coach: David Hunt

No.	Pos.	Player	Date of birth (age)	Caps	Goals	Club
1	GK	Oneil Wilson	8 February 1990 (aged 17)			(Jamaica Football Federation) Calabar HS
3	DF	Peter Kafach	11 May 1991 (aged 15)			No club
4	MF	Christopher Banner	3 March 1990 (aged 17)			(Jamaica Football Federation) Denbigh HS
5	MF	Andre Steele	21 March 1990 (aged 17)			(Jamaica Football Federation) Bridgeport HS
7	MF	Akeem Brown	31 August 1990 (aged 16)			(Jamaica Football Federation) Wolmers Boys
8	DF	Kenniel Hyde	14 February 1990 (aged 17)			(Jamaica Football Federation) Calabar HS
9	MF	Marvin Boothe	17 January 1990 (aged 17)			(Jamaica Football Federation) Glenmur HS
10	FW	McKauly Tulloch	28 February 1991 (aged 16)			(Jamaica Football Federation) Kingston College
11	FW	Dever Orgill	8 March 1990 (aged 17)			(Jamaica Football Federation) Titchfield HS
12	DF	Adrian Christian	30 July 1990 (aged 16)			No club
13	GK	Andre Blake	21 November 1990 (aged 16)			(Jamaica Football Federation) Clarendon College
14	FW	Shavar Brown	12 February 1990 (aged 17)			(Jamaica Football Federation) Ocho Rico HS
15	MF	Noel Mais	30 September 1990 (aged 16)			(Jamaica Football Federation) Kingston College
16	MF	John Ross-Doyley	3 January 1990 (aged 17)			(Jamaica Football Federation) Glenmur HS
17	DF	Jermaine Jarret	17 May 1990 (aged 16)			(Jamaica Football Federation) Hutchkiss College
18	DF	Damaine Thompson	18 February 1990 (aged 17)			(Jamaica Football Federation) Rusea's HS
19	MF	Kabari Palmer	1 June 1990 (aged 16)			(Jamaica Football Federation) Calabar HS
20	DF	Shamari Brown	16 June 1990 (aged 16)			(Jamaica Football Federation) Ascott HS
22	MF	Christopher Waugh	28 November 1990 (aged 16)			(Jamaica Football Federation) Wolmers Boys
23	MF	Yannick Salmon	7 April 1990 (aged 16)			No club

=== Trinidad and Tobago ===
Coach: Anton Corneal

No.	Pos.	Player	Date of birth (age)	Caps	Goals	Club
1	GK	Jesse Fullerton	20 October 1990 (aged 16)			(United States Soccer Federation) Westin
2	DF	Aubrey David	11 October 1990 (aged 16)			No club
3	DF	Ryan O'Neil	11 March 1990 (aged 17)			(Trinidad and Tobago Football Association) Defence Force
4	DF	Sheldon Bateau	20 January 1991 (aged 16)			(Trinidad and Tobago Football Association) San Juan Jabloteh
5	DF	Akeem Adams	13 April 1991 (aged 15)			(Trinidad and Tobago Football Association) W Connection
6	MF	Leston Paul	11 March 1990 (aged 17)			(Trinidad and Tobago Football Association) Vessigny HS
7	DF	Brenton Balboa	9 May 1990 (aged 16)			(Trinidad and Tobago Football Association) Defence Force
8	MF	Sean de Silva	17 January 1990 (aged 17)			(Trinidad and Tobago Football Association) Superstar Rangers
9	MF	Chad DeFreitas	31 January 1990 (aged 17)			(Trinidad and Tobago Football Association) Superstar Rangers
10	FW	Stephen Knox	3 September 1990 (aged 16)			(Trinidad and Tobago Football Association) San Juan Jabloteh
11	FW	Daneil Cyrus	15 December 1990 (aged 16)			(Trinidad and Tobago Football Association) Stokelyvale
12	DF	Robert Primus	10 November 1990 (aged 16)			(Trinidad and Tobago Football Association) San Juan Jabloteh
13	DF	Stephan Chang	28 January 1990 (aged 17)			(Trinidad and Tobago Football Association) San Juan Jabloteh
14	DF	Jean Luc Rochford	10 November 1990 (aged 16)			(Trinidad and Tobago Football Association) Joe Public
15	MF	Chike Sullivan	16 October 1991 (aged 15)			(Trinidad and Tobago Football Association) San Juan Jabloteh
16	FW	Marcus Joseph	29 April 1991 (aged 15)			(Trinidad and Tobago Football Association) San Juan Jabloteh
18	MF	Micah Lewis	20 March 1990 (aged 17)			(Trinidad and Tobago Football Association) San Juan Jabloteh
19	MF	Kevin Molino	17 June 1990 (aged 16)			(Trinidad and Tobago Football Association) San Juan Jabloteh
20	FW	Isaiah Fergusson	19 February 1991 (aged 16)			(United States Soccer Federation) Red Bulls
21	GK	Glenroy Samuel	5 April 1990 (aged 16)			(Trinidad and Tobago Football Association) San Juan Jabloteh

=== United States ===
Coach: William Fulk

No.	Pos.	Player	Date of birth (age)	Caps	Goals	Club
1	GK	Josh Lambo	19 November 1990 (aged 16)			(United States Soccer Federation) Chicago Magic
2	DF	Sheanon Williams	17 March 1990 (aged 17)			(United States Soccer Federation) FC Greater Boston Bolts
3	DF	Mykell Bates	15 April 1990 (aged 16)			(United States Soccer Federation) River City Clash
4	DF	Howard Rivers	1 July 1990 (aged 16)			(United States Soccer Federation) SYA Force
5	DF	Tommy Meyer	20 March 1990 (aged 17)			(United States Soccer Federation) Scott Gallacher
6	DF	Daniel Wenzel	13 April 1990 (aged 16)			(United States Soccer Federation) FC United
7	MF	Nick Millington	9 August 1991 (aged 15)			(United States Soccer Federation) CASL
8	MF	Jared Jeffrey	14 June 1990 (aged 16)			(United States Soccer Federation) Dallas Texans
9	FW	Ellis McLoughlin	8 July 1990 (aged 16)			(United States Soccer Federation) Cross Premier
10	MF	Bryan Dominguez	7 March 1991 (aged 16)			(United States Soccer Federation) Concorde Fire
11	FW	Fuad Ibrahim	15 August 1991 (aged 15)			(United States Soccer Federation) FC Dallas
12	MF	Brendan King	25 February 1990 (aged 17)			(United States Soccer Federation) Chicago Magic
13	FW	Billy Schuler	27 April 1990 (aged 16)			(United States Soccer Federation) Matchfit Academy
14	MF	Jesse Paredes	1 April 1990 (aged 17)			(United States Soccer Federation) ISC Strikers
15	MF	Brek Shea	28 February 1990 (aged 17)			(United States Soccer Federation) Texans
16	DF	Brandon Zimmerman	6 October 1990 (aged 16)			(United States Soccer Federation) Crossfire Premier
17	MF	Greg Garza	16 August 1991 (aged 15)			(United States Soccer Federation) Dallas Texans
18	GK	Zac MacMath	7 August 1991 (aged 15)			(United States Soccer Federation) Clearwater Chargers
19	FW	Alex Nimo	21 March 1990 (aged 17)			(United States Soccer Federation) Portland Academy
20	FW	Alex Dixon	7 February 1990 (aged 17)			(United States Soccer Federation) Texans
