= Frechilla (surname) =

Frechilla is a Spanish surname, originating from the municipality of the same name. Notable people with the surname include:

- Gonzalo Frechilla (born 1990), Dominican soccer player
- Miguel Ángel Frechilla (born 1974), Spanish rugby union player
