= Denbigh High School =

Denbigh High School may refer to:

- Denbigh High School, Denbighshire in Denbigh, Wales, United Kingdom
- Denbigh High School, Luton in Bedfordshire, England, United Kingdom
- Denbigh High School (Jamaica) in Clarendon, Denbigh, Jamaica
- Denbigh High School (Newport News, Virginia) in Newport News, Virginia, USA
