= Diego Estrada =

Diego Estrada may refer to:

- Diego Estrada (runner) (born 1989), Mexican-American Olympic long-distance runner
- Diego Estrada (footballer) (born 1989), Costa Rican footballer
