= 2005 CONCACAF U17 Tournament squads =

== Group A ==
=== Costa Rica ===
No.	Pos.	Player	Date of birth (age)	Caps	Club
1	GK	Alfonso Quesada	March 15, 1988 (aged 17)		(Costa Rica) Alajuela
2	DF	Alonso Vargas	April 5, 1988 (aged 17)		(Costa Rica) Alajuela
3	DF	Rudy Forbes	May 8, 1988 (aged 16)		(Costa Rica) Alajuela
4	MF	Fernando Paniagua	September 9, 1988 (aged 16)		(Costa Rica) Deportivo Saprissa
5	DF	Carlos Chacón	August 3, 1988 (aged 16)		(Costa Rica) B. Mexico
6	DF	David Calvo	October 3, 1988 (aged 16)		(Costa Rica) Alajuela
7	MF	Roberto Carrillo	January 1, 1988 (aged 17)		(Costa Rica) Deportivo Saprissa
9	FW	Julio Cesar García	July 15, 1988 (aged 16)		(Costa Rica) Alajuela
10	MF	Luis Diego Cordero	May 21, 1988 (aged 16)		(Costa Rica) Deportivo Saprissa
11	FW	Jean Carlos Solórzano	January 8, 1988 (aged 17)		(Costa Rica) Alajuela
13	MF	Celso Borges	May 27, 1988 (aged 16)		(Costa Rica) Deportivo Saprissa
14	FW	Carlos Sandoval	July 4, 1988 (aged 16)		(Costa Rica) San Ramón
15	MF	Esteban Rodríguez	January 25, 1988 (aged 17)		(Costa Rica) Carmelita
17	DF	David Myrie	June 1, 1988 (aged 16)		no club
18	GK	Armando Venegas	January 24, 1988 (aged 17)		(Costa Rica) Deportivo Saprissa
19	FW	Guillermo Guardia	April 24, 1988 (aged 16)		(Costa Rica) Alajuela
20	DF	Kendall Waston	January 1, 1988 (aged 17)		(Costa Rica) Deportivo Saprissa
21	FW	Cesar Aguilar	October 7, 1990 (aged 14)		(Costa Rica) Deportivo Saprissa

Delegation

- Under-17 Technical Director: Geovanny Alfaro HERNANDEZT
- Assistant Coach: Jorge Manuel ULATE
- Goalkeeper Coach: Frank CARRILLO
- Delegate: Mario MUÑOZ
- Doctor: Gerardo ARTAVIA
- Trainer: Geonnathan FERNANDEZ
- Massage Therapist: Geovanny CARILLO
- Equipment Manager: Olman MONTERO

=== Cuba ===
No.	Pos.	Player	Date of birth (age)	Caps	Club
1	GK	José Selles	July 29, 1988 (aged 16)		(Cuba) Las Tunas
2	DF	Jesus Montes	July 11, 1988 (aged 16)		(Cuba) Pinar del Río
3	DF	Miguel Angel Lopez	February 15, 1989 (aged 16)		(Cuba) Provincia Habana
4	DF	Denis Suarez	August 16, 1988 (aged 16)		(Cuba) Cienfuegos
5	MF	Yasmany Jesus Bernal	June 23, 1988 (aged 16)		(Cuba) Cienfuegos
6	MF	Yannier Martinez	May 28, 1988 (aged 16)		(Cuba) Villa Clara
7	FW	Luis Alberto Villegas	June 2, 1988 (aged 16)		(Cuba) Villa Clara
8	MF	Alberto Gómez	February 12, 1988 (aged 17)		(Cuba) Guantanamo
9	FW	Leonardo Vila	February 9, 1988 (aged 17)		Santiago de Cuba
10	FW	Adrián Hernández	March 20, 1988 (aged 17)		(Cuba) Ciego de Avila
11	FW	Onay Alberto Martínez	June 10, 1988 (aged 16)		(Cuba) Ciudad Habana
13	DF	Yuri Alberto Altabas	February 3, 1988 (aged 17)		(Cuba) Provincia Habana
14	DF	Armando Trejo	April 6, 1988 (aged 17)		(Cuba) Las Tunas
15	MF	Osmany Torres	January 4, 1988 (aged 17)		(Cuba) Camagüey
16	MF	Felix Guerra	January 14, 1989 (aged 16)		(Cuba) Granma
17	MF	Dayan Gonzalez	January 4, 1988 (aged 17)		(Cuba) Sancti Spiritus
18	DF	Yorlenis Lara	July 10, 1988 (aged 16)		(Cuba) Guantanamo
21	GK	Yosnel De La Luz	December 15, 1989 (aged 15)		(Cuba) Provincia Habana

Delegation

- Head of Delegation: Israel PERERA
- Under-17 Technical Director: Manuel RODRIGUEZ
- Assistant Coaches: Carlos RAMIREZ, Luis Miguel SEARA
- Press Officer: Sergio Enrique ORTEGA
- Doctor: Carlos GONZALEZ
- Psychologist: Lázaro Chi GONZALEZ

=== El Salvador ===
No.	Pos.	Player	Date of birth (age)	Caps	Club
2	DF	Erick Leonel Vigil	April 3, 1989 (aged 16)		no club
3	DF	Fernando Flores	August 9, 1988 (aged 16)		CD F.A.S.
7	DF	Victor Samuel Turcios	April 13, 1988 (aged 16)		Balboa
8	DF	Edgar Espinoza	February 1, 1988 (aged 17)		A. Futuro
9	FW	Cesar Mauricio Vasquez	June 7, 1988 (aged 16)		Municipal Limeño
10	MF	Jilber Adonay Alvarez	April 11, 1988 (aged 17)		Municipal Limeño
11	MF	Juan Carlos Aguilar	February 4, 1988 (aged 17)		Don Bosco
12	DF	Jhonny Hernández	April 10, 1988 (aged 17)		INU
13	DF	Sergio Miguel Palacios	May 14, 1988 (aged 16)		Aspirantes
14	DF	Jersson Gaytan	March 30, 1988 (aged 17)		Vencedor
15	FW	Herberth Ulloa	January 29, 1988 (aged 17)		no club
16	FW	José Nelson Hernández	April 8, 1988 (aged 17)		Aficionado
17	MF	Fernando Monico	January 27, 1988 (aged 17)		A. Futuro
18	FW	Kevin Escobar	March 2, 1988 (aged 17)		Espartano
20	MF	Josué Flores	May 13, 1988 (aged 16)		CD F.A.S.
21	MF	Joel Ely Serrano	January 18, 1988 (aged 17)		Municipal Limeño
22	GK	Benji Oldai Villalobos	July 15, 1988 (aged 16)		no club
25	GK	Guillermo Pino Martinez	May 5, 1988 (aged 16)		no club

Delegation

- Head of Delegation: Jose Humberto TORRES
- Under-17 Technical Director: Raul COCHERARI
- Assistant Coach: Remberto SANTILLANA
- Goalkeeper Coach: Carlos Felipe CAÑADAS
- Delegate: Hugo Orlando VILLALTA
- Doctor: Francisco AMAYA
- Trainer: Manuel Jaime GARCIA
- Equipment Manager: Abraham DIAZ

=== United States ===
No.	Pos.	Player	Date of birth (age)	Caps	Club
1	GK	Bryant Rueckner	January 20, 1988 (aged 17)		PSG
2	DF	Richard Edgar	February 22, 1988 (aged 17)		Potomac Cougars
3	MF	Kevin Alston	May 5, 1988 (aged 16)		Potomac Cougars
4	DF	Eric Lichaj	November 17, 1988 (aged 16)		Chicago Magic
5	DF	Ofori Sarkodie	June 18, 1988 (aged 16)		Chicago Magic
6	DF	Jeremy Hall	September 11, 1988 (aged 16)		HC United
7	DF	Carlos Borja	January 18, 1988 (aged 17)		ISC Strikers
8	MF	Kyle Nakazawa	March 16, 1988 (aged 17)		ISC Strikers
9	FW	Preston Zimmerman	November 21, 1988 (aged 16)		Crossfire Premier
10	FW	David Arvizu	April 19, 1988 (aged 16)		Pateadores
11	MF	Ryan Soroka	March 5, 1988 (aged 17)		FC Delco
12	FW	Eddie Ababio	January 1, 1988 (aged 17)		HC United
13	MF	Blake Wagner	January 29, 1988 (aged 17)		Blackwatch Saints
14	MF	Amaechi Igwe	May 20, 1988 (aged 16)		Santa Clara Sporting
15	DF	Neven Subotić	December 10, 1988 (aged 16)		Manatee Magic
16	MF	Nikolas Besagno	November 15, 1988 (aged 16)		Real Salt Lake
17	MF	Omar Gonzalez	October 11, 1988 (aged 16)		Dallas Texans
18	GK	Brian Perk	July 21, 1989 (aged 15)		Pateadores

Delegation

- Under-17 Technical Director: John HACKWORTH
- Assistant Coaches: Raul DIAZ-ARCE, Keith FULK, Tim Mulqueen
- Coordinator: Thomas NORTON
- Press Officer: Neil BUETHE
- Doctor: Mark SILBEY
- Trainer: Michael WHITE
- Equipment Manager: Timothy RYDER

== Group B ==
=== Canada ===
No.	Pos.	Player	Date of birth (age)	Caps	Club
1	GK	Adam Street	July 7, 1991 (aged 13)		Ontario
2	DF	Robert Kerek	January 15, 1988 (aged 17)		SC Freiburg/GER
3	DF	Marinko Maras	March 18, 1989 (aged 16)		Kalserslautern FC/GER
4	MF	Kyle Oliveira	March 4, 1988 (aged 17)		Ontario
5	DF	Nana Attakora	March 27, 1989 (aged 16)		Ontario
6	MF	Jonathan Beaulieu-Bourgault	September 27, 1988 (aged 16)		Quebec
7	FW	Rudolph Pierre Mayard	February 21, 1988 (aged 17)		Quebec
8	MF	Keegan Ayre	July 4, 1988 (aged 16)		British Columbia
9	FW	Selvin Shane Lammie	August 3, 1988 (aged 16)		Ontario
10	FW	Josue Jaramillo	November 28, 1988 (aged 16)		Ontario
11	FW	A. J. Gray	April 12, 1988 (aged 17)		Ontario
12	MF	Michael Pereira	March 9, 1989 (aged 16)		Ontario
13	DF	Alex Marrello	September 28, 1988 (aged 16)		British Columbia
14	FW	Marcus Haber	January 11, 1989 (aged 16)		British Columbia
15	DF	Curtis Ridley	February 9, 1988 (aged 17)		Alberta
16	DF	Joseph Awuakye	January 21, 1988 (aged 17)		Ontario
17	DF	Adam Lang	February 9, 1988 (aged 17)		British Columbia
22	GK	Lorenzo Borella	March 12, 1988 (aged 17)		Quebec

Delegation

- Head of Delegation: Jim FLEMING
- Under-17 Technical Director: Stephen HART
- Assistant Coach: Sean FLEMING
- Goalkeeper Coach: Djamel LAARABI
- Coordinator: Earl COCHRANE
- Delegate: David MONSALVE
- Trainer: Anthony PELLEGRINO
- Tutor: Mark SWEETAPPLE

=== Haiti ===
No.	Pos.	Player	Date of birth (age)	Caps	Club
1	GK	Peterson Occénat	December 3, 1989 (aged 15)		FHF
2	DF	Symson Exume	October 4, 1988 (aged 16)		FHF
3	DF	Philippe Barthelemy	January 17, 1988 (aged 17)		FHF
4	FW	Vaniel Sirin	October 26, 1989 (aged 15)		FHF
5	FW	Adiet Maddy	February 12, 1988 (aged 17)		FHF
6	MF	Clervilus Evins	October 8, 1989 (aged 15)		FHF
7	DF	Marc-Andre Jean-Baptise	July 19, 1989 (aged 15)		FHF
8	DF	Djery Djenad. Caprice	March 12, 1988 (aged 17)		FHF
9	FW	Johnny Exantus	November 24, 1989 (aged 15)		FHF
10	MF	Brisly Renaud	April 20, 1989 (aged 15)		FHF
11	FW	Sony Norde	July 27, 1989 (aged 15)		FHF
13	DF	Harold Julmiste	December 27, 1988 (aged 16)		FHF
14	FW	Vinsly Philistin	October 28, 1988 (aged 16)		FHF
15	DF	Alfred Robenson	December 13, 1988 (aged 16)		FHF
16	FW	Jeff Bourdeau	February 25, 1989 (aged 16)		FHF
18	MF	Josue Jean-Pierre	February 9, 1989 (aged 16)		FHF
19	MF	Richecarde Theodore	May 30, 1988 (aged 16)		FHF
22	GK	Peterson Espera	February 5, 1988 (aged 17)		FHF

Delegation

- Head of Delegation: Yves JEAN-BART
- Under-17 Technical Director: Jean Yves LABZE
- Assistant Coach: James MORISSET
- Delegates: Antoine CRAAM, Jean Roosevelt DUCASSE, Claudio FREAN, Osvaldo GUITIERREZ

=== Honduras ===
No.	Pos.	Player	Date of birth (age)	Caps	Club
1	GK	Emmanuel Diaz	February 28, 1988 (aged 17)		CD Olimpia
3	DF	Vicente Solorzano	September 27, 1988 (aged 16)		El Triunfo
4	DF	Maynor Martinez	February 4, 1988 (aged 17)		CD Platense
5	DF	Luis Fernando Sosa	January 6, 1988 (aged 17)		CD Olimpia
6	DF	Juan Carlos Garcia	March 8, 1988 (aged 17)		C.D. Marathón
7	FW	Darwin Oliva Garica	March 21, 1989 (aged 16)		Libertad
8	DF	Eliezer Castellanos	July 27, 1988 (aged 16)		CD Victoria
9	FW	Mario Martinez	July 30, 1988 (aged 16)		CD Platense
10	MF	Francisco Mejia	July 22, 1988 (aged 16)		C.D. Marathón
11	FW	Milton Geovany Palacios	April 17, 1988 (aged 16)		Libertad
13	DF	David Molina	March 14, 1988 (aged 17)		C.D. Motagua
14	DF	Cruz Avila	August 8, 1988 (aged 16)		CD Platense
15	FW	Kewin Delano Matute	March 19, 1988 (aged 17)		Libertad
17	DF	Oscar Rene Martinez	March 27, 1988 (aged 17)		CD Olimpia
18	MF	Meller Sanchez	July 28, 1988 (aged 16)		C.D. Motagua
19	MF	Junior Bonilla	February 10, 1988 (aged 17)		Alus
20	MF	Jose Carlos Rivera	July 11, 1988 (aged 16)		C.D. Motagua
22	GK	Cesar Asaul Tejeda	April 23, 1988 (aged 16)		CD Valencia

Delegation

- Head of Delegation: Vicente WILLIAMS
- Under-17 Technical Director: Miguel ESCALANTE
- Assistant Coach: Angel Antonio OBANDO
- Goalkeeper Coach: Marcelo SCALLESI
- Manager: Miguel Angel CASTILLO
- Press Officer: Edwin BANEGAS
- Trainers: Luis Gustavo CABRERA, Augusto MORENO
- Equipment Manager: Jesus GARCIA

=== Mexico ===
No.	Pos.	Player	Date of birth (age)	Caps	Club
1	GK	Sergio Arias	February 27, 1988 (aged 17)		CD Guadalajara
2	DF	Patricio Araujo	January 30, 1988 (aged 17)		CD Guadalajara
3	DF	Efraín Juárez	February 22, 1988 (aged 17)		Pumas UNAM
4	DF	Christian Sánchez	April 4, 1989 (aged 16)		Atlas
5	DF	Jorge Torres Nilo	January 16, 1988 (aged 17)		Atlas
6	MF	Omar Esparza	May 21, 1988 (aged 16)		CD Guadalajara
7	MF	Jorge Hernández	February 22, 1988 (aged 17)		(Mexico) Atlas
8	FW	Giovani dos Santos	May 11, 1989 (aged 15)		(Spain) Barcelona
9	FW	Carlos Vela	March 1, 1989 (aged 16)		CD Guadalajara
10	FW	Ever Guzmán	March 3, 1988 (aged 17)		Monarcas Morelia
11	MF	Mario Gallegos	April 15, 1988 (aged 16)		Atlas
12	GK	Jesus Alejandro Gallardo	January 16, 1988 (aged 17)		Atlas
13	MF	Edgar Andrade	March 2, 1988 (aged 17)		Cruz Azul
14	FW	Heriberto Beltran	June 14, 1988 (aged 16)		Monarcas Morelia
15	MF	Adrian Rodriguez	June 14, 1988 (aged 16)		Monarcas Morelia
16	FW	Mitchel Oviedo	July 7, 1988 (aged 16)		CD Guadalajara
17	DF	Pedro Valverde	April 6, 1988 (aged 17)		Cruz Azul
18	MF	Cesar Villaluz	July 18, 1988 (aged 16)		Cruz Azul

Delegation

- Head of Delegation: Guillermo Luis CANTU
- Under-17 Technical Director: Jesus RAMIREZ
- Head of Administration: Ricardo MARTINEZ
- Press Officer: Mauricio ZAVALA
- Doctor: Gonzalo LUNA
- Trainer: Jesus ZAMUDIO
- Security Officer: Alfonso SILVA
