= Chris Dawes (Jamaican footballer) =

Jamaican footballer (born 1974)

Personal information
- Full name: Christopher Dawes
- Date of birth: 31 May 1974 (age 52)
- Place of birth: Kingston, Jamaica
- Height: 1.80 m (5 ft 11 in)
- Positions: Defender; midfielder

Senior career*
Years	Team	Apps	(Gls)
1994–1996	Galaxy F.C.		
1996	SVD Handzame		
1997–2000	Galaxy F.C.		
2001	Colorado Rapids	16	(0)
2002–2003	Hazard United		
2003–2004	Village United		
2004–2006	Portmore United		

International career
1995–2001	Jamaica	85	(1)
- * Club domestic league appearances and goals

Christopher Dawes (born 31 May 1974) is a retired Jamaican footballer. He was known to be very disciplined, a good passer of the ball and a tight man-marker.

== Club career ==
Nicknamed 'Simba', Dawes has played as a defender or midfielder, starting his career at Jamaican club Galaxy F.C. and having a brief spell at Belgian Fourth Division club SVD Handzame in 1996. In 2001, he signed for MLS club MetroStars only to be traded to Colorado Rapids for a 2002 draft pick. Dawes returned to Jamaica in 2002 joining May Pen based club Hazard United and had a brief stint with Village United before returning to the previous club, now relocated and called Portmore United. He retired in 2006 to become a coach.

== International career ==
He also played for the Jamaica national football team and was a participant at the 1998 FIFA World Cup. He played his last international in 2001 against Costa Rica and earned over 60 caps for the Reggae Boyz. He scored once in a 2000 friendly match against Cayman Islands, which Jamaica won by 6–0.

== Coaching career ==
He is currently manager of Jamaica National Premier League side Sporting Central Academy but is currently on an educational sabbatical working on his coaching badges in the United States and England. In 2010, Dawes returned to coaching Sporting Central Academy.
