= Malik Jakupovic =

American soccer player (born 2009)

Personal information
- Date of birth: June 24, 2009 (age 17)
- Place of birth: Sterling Heights, Michigan, United States
- Height: 1.91 m (6 ft 3 in)
- Position: Forward

Team information
- Current team: Philadelphia Union
- Number: 51

Youth career
- 2023–2025: Philadelphia Union

Senior career*
Years	Team	Apps	(Gls)
2025–	Philadelphia Union II	29	(11)
2026–	Philadelphia Union	7	(1)

International career^{‡}
2025	United States U16	1	(1)
2025–	United States U17	9	(12)
- * Club domestic league appearances and goals as of August 3, 2026 ‡ National team caps and goals as of August 3, 2026

Malik Jakupovic (born June 24, 2009) is an American professional soccer player who plays as a forward for the Philadelphia Union of Major League Soccer.

== Early life ==
Jakupovic was born on June 24, 2009. Born in Sterling Heights, Michigan, United States, he is of Bosnian descent through his parents.

== Club career ==
As a youth player, Jakupovic joined the youth academy of Philadelphia Union. Ahead of the 2026 season, he was promoted to the club's senior team.

== International career ==
Jakupovic is a United States youth international. During February 2026, he played for the United States men's national under-17 soccer team for 2026 CONCACAF U-17 World Cup qualification.

== Style of play ==
Jakupovic plays as a forward. Bosnia and Herzegovina newspaper Sarajevo Times wrote in 2026 that he is a "powerful striker... his physique is similar to [Bosnia international Edin] Džeko".
