= Vicente Garcia (soccer) =

American soccer player (born 2010)

Personal information
- Full name: Vicente Emanuel Garcia
- Date of birth: June 25, 2010 (age 16)
- Position: Midfielder

Team information
- Current team: Ventura County FC
- Number: 45

Youth career
- LA Galaxy

Senior career*
Years	Team	Apps	(Gls)
2025–	Ventura County FC	37	(3)
2026–	LA Galaxy	0	(0)

International career^{‡}
2025	United States U15	9	(1)
2025–	United States U17	10	(1)
- * Club domestic league appearances and goals ‡ National team caps and goals as of 10 June 2026

Vicente Emanuel Garcia (born 25 June 2010) is an American professional soccer player who plays as a midfielder for Ventura County FC.

== Early life ==
Garcia was born on 25 June 2010. An American citizen, he has obtained Mexican citizenship.

== Club career ==
As a youth player, Garcia joined the youth academy of LA Galaxy. Ahead of the 2025 season, he was promoted to the club's reserve team.

On 7 March 2025, he debuted for them during a 3–2 home win over Tacoma Defiance in the league. On 1 August 2026, he was first called up to the Galaxy senior team during a 0–0 home draw with FC Dallas in the league.

== International career ==
Garcia is a United States youth international and has represented the country internationally at under-15 and under-17 level and is eligible to represent Mexico internationally through his parents.

During the summer of 2025, he played for the United States boys' national under-15 soccer team at the 2025 CONCACAF Boys' Under-15 Championship. Six months later, he played for the United States men's national under-17 soccer team for 2026 CONCACAF U-17 World Cup qualification.

== Style of play ==
Garcia plays as a midfielder. American news website U.S. Soccer Collective wrote in 2026 that "Garcia is a versatile midfielder that has super quick feet that help him weave through traffic and in duels. He is very good in recovery situations and works to win the ball back quickly when his team has lost it".
