= United States men's national under-17 soccer team =

United States Under-17
- Nickname: Baby Nats
- Association: United States Soccer Federation (USSF)
- Confederation: CONCACAF
- Sub-confederation: NAFU (North America)
- Head coach: Alex Aldaz
- FIFA code: USA
First colors	Second colors

First international
- El Salvador 1–4 United States (Port of Spain, Trinidad and Tobago; August 26, 1983)

Biggest win
- United States 22–0 U.S. Virgin Islands (San José, Costa Rica; February 10, 2025)

Biggest defeat
- Oman 4–0 United States (Alexandria, Egypt; September 6, 1997); Germany 4–0 United States (Querétaro, Mexico; June 30, 2011); Czech Republic 4–0 United States (Turkey; January 20, 2012); Netherlands 4–0 United States (Goiânia, Brazil; November 2, 2019) Records for competitive matches only.

FIFA U-17 World Cup
- Appearances: 19 (first in 1985)
- Best result: Fourth place (1999)

CONCACAF Under-17 Championship
- Appearances: 19 (first in 1983)
- Best result: Champions (1983, 1992, 2011)
Medal record
CONCACAF Under-17 Championship
Gold medal – first place	1983 Trinidad and Tobago
Gold medal – first place	1992 Cuba
Gold medal – first place	2011 Jamaica
Silver medal – second place	1987 Honduras
Silver medal – second place	1988 Trinidad and Tobago
Silver medal – second place	1991 Trinidad and Tobago
Silver medal – second place	1994 El Salvador
Silver medal – second place	1996 Trinidad and Tobago
Silver medal – second place	2017 Panama
Silver medal – second place	2019 United States
Silver medal – second place	2023 Guatemala

The United States under-17 men's national soccer team is controlled by the United States Soccer Federation. The highest level of competition in which the team may compete is in the FIFA U-17 World Cup, which is held annually.

== Competitive record ==
Champions Runners-up Third place Fourth place

=== FIFA U-17 World Cup ===
FIFA U-17 World Cup
Year	Result	Pos	Pld	W	D	L	F	A	Squad
(China) 1985	Group stage	12th	3	1	0	2	3	5	Squad
(Canada) 1987	Group stage	13th	3	1	0	2	3	5	Squad
(Scotland) 1989	Group stage	9th	3	1	1	1	5	7	Squad
(Italy) 1991	Quarterfinals	5th	4	3	1	0	6	2	Squad
(Japan) 1993	Quarterfinals	7th	4	1	1	2	8	8	Squad
(Ecuador) 1995	Group stage	15th	3	0	0	3	1	6	Squad
(Egypt) 1997	Group stage	11th	3	1	0	2	4	7	Squad
(New Zealand) 1999	Fourth place	4th	6	3	2	1	9	8	Squad
(Trinidad and Tobago) 2001	Group stage	15th	3	0	0	3	3	8	Squad
(Finland) 2003	Quarterfinals	5th	4	2	0	2	8	7	Squad
(Peru) 2005	Quarterfinals	5th	4	2	1	1	7	6	Squad
(South Korea) 2007	Round of 16	16th	4	1	0	3	7	9	Squad
(Nigeria) 2009	Round of 16	12th	4	2	0	2	4	4	Squad
(Mexico) 2011	Round of 16	12th	4	1	1	2	4	6	Squad
(United Arab Emirates) 2013	Did not qualify								
(Chile) 2015	Group stage	21st	3	0	1	2	3	8	Squad
(India) 2017	Quarterfinals	7th	5	3	0	2	11	7	Squad
(Brazil) 2019	Group stage	20th	3	0	1	2	1	8	Squad
(Peru) 2021	Cancelled								
(Indonesia) 2023	Round of 16	15th	4	2	0	2	7	8	Squad
(Qatar) 2025	Round of 32	18th	4	3	1	0	5	2	Squad
(Qatar) 2026	Withdrew								Squad
Total	0 title	19/22	71	27	10	34	99	121	—

=== CONCACAF Under-17 Championship / World Cup Qualification ===
CONCACAF Under-17 Championship
Year	Result	Pos	Pld	W	D	L	F	A	Squad
(Trinidad and Tobago) 1983	Champions	1st	4	2	2	0	7	2	Squad
(Mexico) 1985	Did not participate								
(Honduras) 1987	Runners-up	2nd	5	4	0	1	13	7	Squad
(Trinidad and Tobago) 1988	Runners-up	2nd	7	5	0	2	22	4	Squad
(Trinidad and Tobago) 1991	Runners-up	2nd	6	3	3	0	15	3	Squad
(Cuba) 1992	Champions	1st	6	5	0	1	15	5	Squad
(El Salvador) 1994	Runners-up	2nd	6	4	0	2	17	10	Squad
(Trinidad and Tobago) 1996	Runners-up	2nd	6	3	1	2	14	7	Squad
(Jamaica) (El Salvador) 1999	2nd, Group A		5	3	2	0	15	3	Squad
(Honduras) (United States) 2001	1st, Group A		3	3	0	0	10	3	Squad
(Guatemala) (Canada) 2003	1st, Group A		3	2	1	0	7	1	Squad
(Costa Rica) (Mexico) 2005	1st, Group A		3	2	1	0	6	2	Squad
(Honduras) (Jamaica) 2007	1st, Group B		4	3	0	1	9	5	Squad
(Mexico) 2009	1st, Group A		3	3	0	0	12	2	Squad
(Jamaica) 2011	Champions	1st	5	5	0	0	12	3	Squad
(Panama) 2013	Quarterfinals		3	2	0	1	5	3	Squad
(Honduras) 2015	3rd, Group A		6	3	2	1	13	4	Squad
(Panama) 2017	Runners-up	2nd	6	5	1	0	20	6	Squad
(United States) 2019	Runners-up	2nd	7	6	0	1	28	5	Squad
2020	Cancelled due to the COVID-19 pandemic								
(Guatemala) 2023	Runners-up	2nd	7	6	0	1	24	7	Squad
Total	3 titles	19/21	95	69	13	13	264	82	—N/a
CONCACAF Under-17 World Cup Qualification
(Bermuda) (Costa Rica) (Guatemala) (Honduras) (Mexico) (Panama) 2025	Group F winner		3	3	0	0	31	0	Squad
(Costa Rica) (Guatemala) (Honduras) (Panama) (Saint Vincent and the Grenadines) (Trinidad and Tobago) 2026	Group E winner		3	2	1	0	19	1	Squad
Total	—N/a	2/2	6	5	1	0	50	1	—N/a

== Results and schedule ==
The following is a list of match results in the last 12 months, as well as any future matches that have been scheduled.

Legend Win Draw Lose Fixture

=== 2025 ===
November 5 2025 FIFA U-17 World Cup GS	United States	1–0	Burkina Faso	Al Rayyan, Qatar
18:15	Sullivan 79'	Report		Stadium: Aspire Zone (pitch 4); Attendance: N/A; Referee: Sander van der Eijk (Netherlands)

November 8 2025 FIFA U-17 World Cup GS	United States	2–1	Tajikistan	Al Rayyan, Qatar
17:45	Berchimas 30'; Sullivan 61' (pen.)	Report	Nazriev 3'	Stadium: Aspire Zone (pitch 2); Attendance: N/A; Referee: Tanguy Mebiame (Gabon)

November 11 2025 FIFA U-17 World Cup GS	Czech Republic	0–1	United States	Al Rayyan, Qatar
17:45		Report	Albert 78'	Stadium: Aspire Zone (pitch 4); Attendance: N/A; Referee: Yender Herrera (Venezuela)

November 13 Friendly	England	5–2	United States	Dubai
5:00 pm UST	Thompson; Madjo; Eboue,	Report	Jakupovic,	Stadium: Shabab Al Ahli Stadium

November 14 2025 FIFA U-17 World Cup R32	United States	1–1 (3–4 p)	Morocco	Al Rayyan, Qatar
18:45	Terry 21'	Report	Ouazane 90'	Stadium: Aspire Zone (pitch 7); Attendance: N/A; Referee: Roberto Pérez (Peru)
	Penalties
	Sullivan (penalty scored); Sanchez (penalty missed); Adams (penalty scored); Albert (penalty scored); Carrizo (penalty missed)		(penalty scored) Baha; (penalty scored) El Aoud; (penalty scored) Dardake; (penalty missed) Mouhoub; (penalty scored) Hidaoui

November 15 Friendly	Australia	0–1	United States	Dubai
3:30 pm UST		Report	Jakupovic 58'	Stadium: Shabab Al Ahli Stadium

November 18 Friendly	Ivory Coast	4–2	United States	Dubai
11:00 am UST	Kouame 20'; Haidara 68'; Diakite 86'; Boly 90'	Report	Jakupovic 38'; Wells 65'	Stadium: Shabab Al Ahli Stadium

=== 2026 ===
February 5 2026 CONCACAF U-17 World Cup qualification	United States	8–0	Saint Vincent and the Grenadines	Arnos Vale, Saint Vincent and the Grenadines
6:00 pm ET	Medina 6', 28', 37'; Peterson 15' (o.g.); Sokoloff 61', 66'; Jakupovic 71', 87'	Report		Stadium: Arnos Vale Stadium; Attendance: 375; Referee: Michah Erskine (Guyana)

February 7 2026 CONCACAF U-17 World Cup qualification	Saint Kitts and Nevis	0–10	United States	Arnos Vale, Saint Vincent and the Grenadines
7:00 pm ET		Report	Jakupovic 7', 23', 44', 80' (pen.), 84'; Garcia 36' (pen.); Dimareli 58' (pen.), 72'; Chadwick 69'; Forfor 90'	Stadium: Arnos Vale Stadium; Attendance: 250; Referee: Renlee Napoleon (Saint Lucia)

February 10 2026 CONCACAF U-17 World Cup qualification	United States	1–1	Dominican Republic	Arnos Vale, Saint Vincent and the Grenadines
1:00 pm ET	Jakupovic 41'	Report	Garcia 44'	Stadium: Arnos Vale Stadium; Attendance: 210; Referee: Jonathan Leiton (Costa Rica)

March 28 Friendly	Paraguay	3–3	United States	Ypané, Paraguay
				Stadium: Centro de Alto Rendimiento de Futbol Femenino; Attendance: 0

June 7 Friendly	Brazil	4–0	United States	Natal, Brazil
	Rodrigo; Beni; Kauê; Pape	Report		Stadium: Arena das Dunas

June 10 Friendly	Brazil	1–0	United States	Natal, Brazil
	Pape	Report		Stadium: Arena das Dunas

September 30 Friendly	Republic of Ireland	1–1	United States	Puerto Banús, Spain
	Murphy 74'	Report	Cadigan 14'	Stadium: Banús Football Center

October 1 Friendly	Belgium	4-1	United States	Puerto Banús, Spain
		Report	Lucero	Stadium: Banús Football Center

October 6 Friendly	Netherlands	2–2	United States	Puerto Banús, Spain
		Report		Stadium: La Quinta Football Center

November 21 FIFA U-17 World Cup GS	United States	Withdrew (Note: Team withdrew on 11 November 2026, citing security concerns.)	Montenegro	Al Rayyan, Qatar
9:30 EST				Stadium: Aspire Zone

November 24 FIFA U-17 World Cup GS	United States	Withdrew	Chile	Al Rayyan, Qatar
9:30 EST				Stadium: Aspire Zone

November 27 FIFA U-17 World Cup GS	Algeria	Withdrew	United States	Al Rayyan, Qatar
11:00 EST				Stadium: Aspire Zone

== Players ==
=== Current squad ===
The original 21 players were called up for 2026 FIFA U-17 World Cup before withdrawal.

Caps and goals are current as of February 10, 2026, after match against Dominican Republic.

No.	Pos.	Player	Date of birth (age)	Club
	GK	James Donaldson	20 March 2009 (aged 17)	(United States Soccer Federation) Atlanta United 2
	GK	Philipp Eckle	9 March 2009 (aged 17)	(German Football Association) Augsburg
	GK	Toby Szewczyk	26 January 2009 (aged 17)	(United States Soccer Federation) New York Red Bulls Academy
	DF	Miles Aalbersberg	14 March 2010 (aged 16)	(Royal Dutch Football Association) Ajax Youth Academy
	DF	Eddie Chadwick	7 August 2009 (aged 17)	(The Football Association) Queens Park Rangers
	DF	Gianmarco Di Noto	27 March 2009 (aged 17)	(United States Soccer Federation) Columbus Crew 2
	DF	Prince Forfor	14 March 2009 (aged 17)	(United States Soccer Federation) Columbus Crew 2
	DF	Astin Mbaye	5 March 2009 (aged 17)	(Italian Football Federation) AC Milan Academy
	DF	Joshua Wilbrenninck-van Cuilenborg	8 January 2009 (aged 17)	(Royal Dutch Football Association) Feyenoord Academy
	MF	Deven Cadigan	15 March 2009 (aged 17)	(United States Soccer Federation) New York Red Bulls Academy
	MF	Vinny Garcia	25 July 2010 (aged 16)	(United States Soccer Federation) LA Galaxy Academy
	MF	Peter Molinari	28 January 2009 (aged 17)	(United States Soccer Federation) New York City FC II
	MF	Judah Siqueira	27 March 2009 (aged 17)	(United States Soccer Federation) New England Revolution II
	MF	Kaedren Spivey	28 May 2009 (aged 17)	(United States Soccer Federation) San Jose Earthquakes II
	MF	Ignacio Suarez-Couri	3 April 2009 (aged 17)	(United States Soccer Federation) Atlanta United 2
	FW	Kashan Hines	3 January 2009 (aged 17)	(United States Soccer Federation) Sporting Kansas City II
	FW	Malik Jakupovic	24 June 2009 (aged 17)	(United States Soccer Federation) Philadelphia Union
	FW	Will Ostrander	7 April 2009 (aged 17)	(Royal Dutch Football Association) PSV Eindhoven Academy
	FW	Robert Turdean	4 January 2010 (aged 16)	(United States Soccer Federation) Chicago Fire Academy
	FW	Makai Wells	2 January 2009 (aged 17)	(United States Soccer Federation) New England Revolution II
	FW	Edward Wumah	7 January 2009 (aged 17)	(Royal Spanish Football Federation) Girona Academy

=== Recent call-ups ===
The following players have been called up in the past 12 months:

- March 2026 training camp.
- March 2026 training camp.
- 2026 CONCACAF U-17 World Cup qualification
- 2025 FIFA U-17 World Cup.
- November 2025 training camp.

Pos.	Player	Date of birth (age)	Caps	Goals	Club	Latest call-up
GK	Connor Dale	June 29, 2010 (age 16)	0	0	(United States) FC Cincinnati Academy	March 2026 training camp
GK	Jason Nemo Jr	February 10, 2010 (age 16)	0	0	(United States) Chicago Fire Academy	March 2026 training camp
GK	Matthew White	January 9, 2009 (age 17)	1	0	(United States) Philadelphia Union Academy	March 2026 training camp
GK	Keller Abbott	March 14, 2009 (age 17)	0	0	(United States) Columbus Crew Academy	2026 CONCACAF U-17 World Cup qualification
GK	Aidan Stokes	January 14, 2008 (age 18)	11	0	(United States) New York Red Bulls II	2025 FIFA U-17 World Cup
GK	Jack Kortkamp	January 28, 2008 (age 18)	3	0	(United States) Sporting Kansas City II	2025 FIFA U-17 World Cup
GK	William Lodmell	February 5, 2008 (age 18)	2	0	(Portugal) Sporting CP Academy	2025 FIFA U-17 World Cup
DF	Jeremiah Alexander-Munoz	February 25, 2010 (age 16)	0	0	(United States) Charlotte FC Academy	March 2026 training camp
DF	Lennox Alvarado	January 1, 2010 (age 16)	0	0	(United States) Orlando City Academy	March 2026 training camp
DF	Luca Antongirolami	October 1, 2010 (age 16)	0	0	(United States) Sporting Kansas City Academy	March 2026 training camp
DF	Oluwaseyitan Fakiyesi	August 17, 2010 (age 16)	0	0	(United States) Atlanta United Academy	March 2026 training camp
DF	Owen Jorgensen	February 15, 2010 (age 16)	0	0	(United States) St. Louis City 2	March 2026 training camp
DF	Landon Mulvenna	February 19, 2010 (age 16)	0	0	(United States) Philadelphia Union Academy	March 2026 training camp
DF	Rocky Rommel	February 27, 2010 (age 16)	0	0	(United States) San Jose Earthquake Academy	March 2026 training camp
DF	Alex Soria	December 3, 2010 (age 15)	0	0	(United States) FC Dallas Academy	March 2026 training camp
DF	Liam Vejrostek	December 29, 2009 (age 16)	2	0	(United States) FC Dallas Academy	March 2026 training camp
DF	Tyson Espy	April 3, 2009 (age 17)	3	0	(United States) Orange County SC	March 2026 training camp
DF	Daniel Barrett	April 20, 2009 (age 17)	2	0	(United States) Houston Dynamo 2	2026 CONCACAF U-17 World Cup qualification
DF	Gio Villa	January 3, 2008 (age 18)	15	0	(United States) Real Salt Lake Academy	2025 FIFA U-17 World Cup
DF	Pedro Guimaraes	April 10, 2008 (age 18)	13	1	(United States) Orange County SC	2025 FIFA U-17 World Cup
DF	Christopher Cupps	May 26, 2008 (age 18)	11	0	(United States) Chicago Fire FC II	2025 FIFA U-17 World Cup
DF	Ramiz Hamouda	May 26, 2008 (age 18)	9	2	(United States) Birmingham Legion FC	2025 FIFA U-17 World Cup
DF	Jordan Griffin	October 25, 2008 (age 18)	3	0	(United States) Philadelphia Union Academy	2025 FIFA U-17 World Cup
DF	Enrique Martinez	June 12, 2008 (age 18)	13	2	(United States) Ventura County FC	2025 FIFA U-17 World Cup
DF	Manu Romero	April 6, 2009 (age 17)	0	0	(Spain) Real Madrid Academy	November 2025 training camp
MF	Anthony Applewhaite	October 31, 2010 (age 16)	0	0	(Germany) Mainz Academy	March 2026 training camp
MF	Kevin Baldwin	August 13, 2010 (age 16)	0	0	(Germany) Mainz Academy	March 2026 training camp
MF	Vincenzo DAnnunzio	February 11, 2010 (age 16)	0	0	(Netherlands) Feyenoord Academy	March 2026 training camp
MF	Christopher Morales	November 28, 2010 (age 15)	0	0	(United States) Chicago Fire FC II	March 2026 training camp
MF	William Recupero	January 11, 2010 (age 16)	0	0	(Germany) Stuttgart Academy	March 2026 training camp
MF	Nathan Tchoumba	November 24, 2010 (age 15)	0	0	(United States) Colorado Rapids 2	March 2026 training camp
MF	Jai Bansoodeb	March 15, 2009 (age 17)	0	0	(England) Brentford U18	March 2026 training camp
MF	Willyam Ferreira	February 7, 2009 (age 17)	0	0	(United States) Philadelphia Union II	March 2026 training camp
MF	Landry Walker	May 15, 2009 (age 17)	3	0	(United States) San Antonio Academy	2026 CONCACAF U-17 World Cup qualification
MF	Roko Pehar	June 1, 2009 (age 17)	1	0	(United States) Chicago Fire Academy	2026 CONCACAF U-17 World Cup qualification
MF	Paul Sokoloff	July 9, 2009 (age 17)	3	2	(United States) New York Red Bulls II	2026 CONCACAF U-17 World Cup qualification
MF	Cavan Sullivan	September 28, 2009 (age 17)	11	4	(United States) Philadelphia Union	2025 FIFA U-17 World Cup
MF	Jude Terry	October 8, 2008 (age 18)	9	8	(United States) Los Angeles FC 2	2025 FIFA U-17 World Cup
MF	Máximo Carrizo	February 28, 2008 (age 18)	11	6	(United States) New York City FC	2025 FIFA U-17 World Cup
MF	Cooper Sanchez	March 26, 2008 (age 18)	9	0	(United States) Atlanta United 2	2025 FIFA U-17 World Cup
MF	Luca Moisa	April 20, 2008 (age 18)	9	0	(United States) Real Salt Lake	2025 FIFA U-17 World Cup
MF	Mateo Tsakiris	March 5, 2008 (age 18)	6	0	(United States) Ventura County FC	2025 FIFA U-17 World Cup
MF	Xander Newstead	April 23, 2009 (age 17)	0	0	(Netherlands) Ajax	November 2025 training camp
MF	Jacob Ramirez	August 27, 2009 (age 17)	0	0	(United States) Orlando Fire Academy	November 2025 training camp
FW	Román Avakian Gomez	July 6, 2010 (age 16)	0	0	(Germany) Mainz Academy	March 2026 training camp
FW	Jamil Danjaji	March 2, 2010 (age 16)	0	0	(United States) Columbus Crew Academy	March 2026 training camp
FW	Landon Lucero	January 1, 2010 (age 16)	0	0	(United States) Seattle Sounders Academy	March 2026 training camp
FW	Kaeden McDowell	January 29, 2011 (age 15)	0	0	(United States) Charlotte FC Academy	March 2026 training camp
FW	Paxon Ruffin	January 28, 2010 (age 16)	0	0	(Mexico) Monterrey	March 2026 training camp
FW	Liam Stribling	November 12, 2010 (age 16)	0	0	(United States) Nashville Academy	March 2026 training camp
FW	Kashan Hines	March 1, 2009 (age 17)	0	0	(United States) Sporting Kansas City Academy	March 2026 training camp
FW	Darris Hyte	February 15, 2009 (age 17)	0	0	(United States) Chicago Fire FC II	March 2026 training camp
FW	Mattheo Dimareli	May 28, 2009 (age 17)	3	2	(United States) Houston Dynamo 2	March 2026 training camp
FW	Ademar Chavez	January 12, 2009 (age 17)	0	0	(United States) FC Cincinnati	March 2026 training camp
FW	Tyler Gladstone	July 7, 2009 (age 17)	0	0	(United States) Philadelphia Union Academy	March 2026 training camp
FW	Makai Wells	January 2, 2009 (age 17)	0	0	(United States) New England Revolution Academy	March 2026 training camp
FW	Myles Gardner	April 19, 2009 (age 17)	3	0	(United States) Houston Dynamo 2	2026 CONCACAF U-17 World Cup qualification
FW	Max Steelman	February 2, 2009 (age 17)	2	0	(United States) LA Galaxy Academy	2026 CONCACAF U-17 World Cup qualification
FW	Nimfasha Berchimas	February 22, 2008 (age 18)	6	1	(United States) Crown Legacy FC	2025 FIFA U-17 World Cup
FW	Chase Adams	April 17, 2008 (age 18)	11	15	(United States) Columbus Crew 2	2025 FIFA U-17 World Cup
FW	Mathis Albert	May 21, 2009 (age 17)	9	3	(Germany) Borussia Dortmund Academy	2025 FIFA U-17 World Cup
FW	Kellan LeBlanc	May 17, 2008 (age 18)	9	1	(United States) Philadelphia Union II	2025 FIFA U-17 World Cup
FW	Julian Hall	March 24, 2008 (age 18)	7	1	(United States) New York Red Bulls	2025 FIFA U-17 World Cup
FW	Jamir Johnson	July 7, 2008 (age 18)	10	3	(United States) Philadelphia Union Academy	2025 FIFA U-17 World Cup
FW	Rylan Hashimoto	May 11, 2009 (age 17)	0	0	(United States) Real Salt Lake Academy	November 2025 training camp
FW	Matthias Vieux	June 9, 2009 (age 17)	0	0	(United States) Inter Miami Academy	November 2025 training camp
FW	Makai Wells	January 2, 2009 (age 17)	0	0	(United States) New England Revolution II	November 2025 training camp

- PRE: Preliminary squad
- ^{INJ} = Injured

== Honors ==
- FIFA U-17 World Cup
  - Fourth Place: 1999
- CONCACAF U-17 Championship
  - Winners: 1983, 1992, 2011
  - Runners-up: 1987, 1988, 1991, 1994, 1996, 2017, 2019, 2023

== See also ==
- IMG Soccer Academy
- United States men's national soccer team
- United States men's national under-20 soccer team
- United States men's national under-23 soccer team
