= Nelson Rivera =

Salvadoran footballer (1991-2010)

Personal information
- Full name: Nelson Ismael Rivera Tobías
- Date of birth: 24 June 1991
- Place of birth: Santa Ana, El Salvador
- Date of death: 3 October 2010 (aged 19)
- Place of death: San Salvador, El Salvador
- Height: 1.78 m (5 ft 10 in)
- Position: Defender

Youth career
- 2008–2009: Turín-FESA

Senior career*
Years	Team	Apps	(Gls)
2009–2010	Titán		
2010	Isidro Metapan.	1	(0)

International career
2008–2010	El Salvador U20		
2010	El Salvador U21		
- * Club domestic league appearances and goals

Nelson Ismael Rivera Tobías (24 June 1991 – 3 October 2010) was a Salvadoran footballer who last played as a defender for Isidro Metapan until his death.

== Club career ==
Rivera started his career at Third Division outfit Turín-FESA and moved one level up when signed by Salvadoran second division side Titán in 2009. He then joined Primera División de Fútbol de El Salvador team Isidro Metapan before the start of the 2010 Apertura.

== Death ==
On the night of 18 September 2010, Rivera was shot in the head after unknown gunmen attacked the car he was traveling in. According to sources, Rivera was traveling with teammates Andrés Flores and Kevin Santamaria when they came under gunfire. The incident took place in El Congo, shortly after they had played a league match against UES.

A series of operations to try to remove the bullet were made, but Rivera died in an intensive care unit on the night of 3 October 2010.

On 16 October 2010, the alleged killers were caught and charged with aggravated homicide. The Attorney General's Office confirmed through a press release the capture of Victor Manuel Colorado and Daniel Sanchez, both involved in the death of the young footballer.
