= Javier de la Rosa =

Spanish lawyer and businessman (born 1947)

Francisco Javier de la Rosa (born 1947) is a Spanish lawyer and businessman.

De la Rosa was the head of the Spanish conglomerate called Grupo Torras during the six years from 1986 to 1992, when the London-based Kuwait Investment Office (KIO) invested $5 billion in Torras. KIO state that as much as $1 billion was stolen, and much of the rest "squandered through egregious mismanagement".

De la Rosa's name has appeared in the leaked Panama Papers.
