= Dayan Gonzalez =

Cuban boxer (born 1999)

Personal information
- Nickname: Dynamite
- Born: 8 March 1999 (age 27) Havana, Cuba
- Height: 5 ft 6 in (1.68 m)
- Weight: Featherweight

Boxing career
- Stance: Orthodox

Boxing record
- Total fights: 17
- Wins: 16
- Win by KO: 14
- Losses: 0
- No contests: 1

Dayan Gonzalez (born 8 March 1999) is a Cuban professional boxer. He competes in the featherweight division where he his the current IBO featherweight champion.

== Professional career ==
Gonzalez faced Egyptian Mostafa Elhamy in his third fight on the undercard of Guillermo Rigondeaux vs Vincent Astrolabio. Gonzalez stopped him in the first round with a body shot.

=== Gonzalez vs Mikham ===
In the first title fight of his career Gonzalez took on fellow unbeaten boxer Wira Mikham of Thailand in Liverpool. In a very one sided performance Gonzalaz made history. He stopped Mikham in 44 seconds which was the fastest ever in an IBO title fight. After the fight Gonzalez expressed interest in fighting WBA champion and Liverpools own Nick Ball.

== Professional boxing record ==
17 fights	16 wins	0 losses
By knockout	14	0
By decision	2	0
No contests	1	

No.	Result	Record	Opponent	Type	Round, time	Date	Location	Notes
17	Win	16–0 (1)	Wira Mikham	TKO	1 (12), 0:44	6 Dec 2024	Exhibition Centre, Liverpool, England	
16	Win	15–0 (1)	Ariel Perez De La Torre	TKO	2 (10), 0:28	6 Sep 2024	Wembley Stadium, London, England	
15	Win	14–0 (1)	Allen Kabungo	KO	2 (8), 0:26	28 Apr 2024	Agenda Arena, Dubai, U.A.E.	
14	Win	13–0 (1)	David Carmona	TKO	2 (8), 0:28	27 Jan 2024	Cuban Boxing Club, Dubai, U.A.E.	
13	Win	12–0 (1)	Edgar Alor	TKO	9 (10), 0:28	25 Nov 2023	Round 10 Boxing Club, Dubai, U.A.E.	
12	Win	11–0 (1)	Ken Jordan	KO	2 (8), 1:00	14 Oct 2023	Motospace Dubai Investment Park, Dubai, U.A.E.	
11	Win	10–0 (1)	Joseph Ambo	TKO	67 (10), 2:21	13 May 2023	Agenda Arena, Dubai, U.A.E.	
10	Win	9–0 (1)	Alie Laurel	KO	3 (8), 1:35	10 Mar 2023	Cuban Boxing Club, Dubai, U.A.E.	
9	Win	8–0 (1)	Zubairi Nadhomie	KO	2 (6), 0:25	13 Jan 2023	MTN Arena Lugogo, Kampala, Uganda	
8	Win	7–0 (1)	Khvicha Gigolashvili	TKO	3 (8), 1:11	17 Sep 2022	Cuban Boxing Club, Dubai, U.A.E.	
7	Win	6–0 (1)	Charles Chilala	UD	8	18 Jun 2022	Caesars Palace, Dubai, U.A.E.	
6	Win	5–0 (1)	Disan Mubiru	TKO	3 (6), 2:16	4 Jun 2022	Dubai Maritime City, Dubai, U.A.E.	
5	NC	4–0 (1)	Sharobiddin Jurakhonov	NC	3 (6), 1:25	30 Apr 2022	Radisson Red, Dubai, U.A.E.	
4	Win	4–0	Lokesh Dangi	TK0	1 (6), 0:48	26 Mar 2022	Habtoor Grand Hotel, Dubai, U.A.E.	
3	Win	3–0	Mostafa Elhamy	KO	1 (6), 1:23	26 Feb 2022	Dubai Marina, Dubai, U.A.E.	
2	Win	2–0	Oluwaseun Emmanuel Oluwasuy	UD	6	15 Jan 2022	Cuban Boxing Club, Dubai, U.A.E.	
1	Win	1–0	Dancan Damulira	TKO	1 (4), 1:43	15 Dec 2021	Cuban Boxing Club, Dubai, U.A.E.	
