= Alanzo Adlam =

Jamaican footballer (born 1989)

Personal information
- Date of birth: 12 March 1989 (age 37)
- Height: 1.74 m (5 ft 8 1/2 in)
- Position: Striker

Team information
- Current team: Portmore United

Senior career*
Years	Team	Apps	(Gls)
2008–2010	Sporting Central Academy		
2010–	Portmore United		
2013	→IFK Mariehamn (loan)	23	(1)

International career^{‡}
2007–2009	Jamaica U20	3	(0)
2011	Jamaica U23	2	(0)
2012–	Jamaica	1	(0)
- * Club domestic league appearances and goals as of 27 June 2012 ‡ National team caps and goals as of 27 June 2012

Alanzo Adlam (born 12 March 1989) is a Jamaican international footballer who plays for Portmore United, as a striker.

== Career ==
Adlam has played club football for Sporting Central Academy and Portmore United. Adlam signed a season long loan to IFK Mariehamn in Finland in 2013.

== International career ==
Adlam also played for Jamaica U20 national team since 2006. He made his international debut for Jamaica in 2012.

== Honours ==
Portmore United

- Winner (1): 2012 Jamaica National Premier League
