= César Ledesma =

Dominican footballer (born 1990)

Personal information
- Full name: César Antonio Ledesma Turbi
- Date of birth: 4 June 1990 (age 36)
- Place of birth: San Cristóbal, Dominican Republic
- Height: 1.73 m (5 ft 8 in)
- Position: Right back

Senior career*
Years	Team	Apps	(Gls)
2007–2011	Young Boys II	71	(5)
2011–2013	FC Biel-Bienne	40	(0)
2013–2016	FC Münsingen	28	(1)
2016–2017	FC Köniz	33	(4)
2017–2018	FC Köniz II		
2018–2022	FC Grenchen	33	(2)
Total		205	(12)

International career
2011–2014	Dominican Republic	10	(0)
- * Club domestic league appearances and goals

César Antonio Ledesma Turbí (born 4 June 1990) is a Dominican former international footballer who played as a right back.

== Club career ==
Born in San Cristóbal, Ledesma played in Switzerland for Young Boys II, FC Biel-Bienne, FC Münsingen, FC Köniz, FC Köniz II and FC Grenchen.

== International career ==
He made his international debut for Dominican Republic in 2011, earning 8 caps, and appearing in FIFA World Cup qualifying matches.
