= Ernesto Jiménez =

Dominican footballer

Ernesto Jimenez
Personal information
- Full name: Ernesto Manuel Jimenez Cabrera
- Date of birth: 28 June 1989 (age 37)
- Place of birth: Miami, United States
- Height: 6 ft 2 in (1.88 m)
- Position: Defender

Youth career
- Newell's Old Boys
- 2009–2010: All Boys

Senior career*
Years	Team	Apps	(Gls)
2010	Western Michigan Broncos		
2011	San Diego Toreros		

International career^{‡}
2008–	Dominican Republic	2	(0)
- * Club domestic league appearances and goals ‡ National team caps and goals as of 05:41, 13 April 2012 (UTC)

Ernesto Manuel Jimenez Cabrera (born 28 June 1989) is a Dominican international footballer who played college soccer last year for the San Diego Toreros, as a defender.

== Career ==
Jimenez has played for All Boys reserve team.

=== International career ===
Jimenez was born in Miami (USA) to a Spanish father and a Dominican mother, but grew up in Santo Domingo. He made his international debut for Dominican Republic in 2008, and has appeared in FIFA World Cup qualifying matches.
