= Gonzalo Frechilla =

Dominican Republic former footballer

Personal information
- Full name: Gonzalo Antonio Frechilla Armenteros
- Date of birth: 8 August 1990 (age 36)
- Place of birth: Santo Domingo, Dominican Republic
- Height: 1.77 m (5 ft 10 in)
- Position: Midfielder

College career
Years	Team	Apps	(Gls)
2009–2011	Maryland Terrapins	6	(0)
2012–2013	FIU Panthers	26	(2)

Senior career*
Years	Team	Apps	(Gls)
2009	Bauger		

International career
2010	Dominican Republic	2	(1)
- * Club domestic league appearances and goals

Gonzalo Antonio Frechilla Armenteros (born 8 August 1990) is a Dominican Republic former footballer who played as a midfielder.

== Career ==
Born in Santo Domingo, Frechilla played club football for Bauger before playing college soccer in the United States with the Maryland Terrapins and the FIU Panthers.

He represented the Dominican Republic at senior international level, scoring 1 goal in 2 games in 2010.
