= Julien Latendresse-Lévesque =

Canadian soccer player (born 1991)

Personal information
- Date of birth: 27 February 1991 (age 35)
- Place of birth: Montreal, Canada
- Height: 1.86 m (6 ft 1 in)
- Position: Goalkeeper

Team information
- Current team: Radefelder SV

Senior career*
Years	Team	Apps	(Gls)
2009	Vancouver Whitecaps FC U-23	7	(0)
2010–2013	Energie Cottbus II	23	(0)
2014–2017	1. FC Lokomotive Leipzig	36	(0)
2017–2021	BSG Chemie Leipzig	29	(0)
2023–	Radefelder SV	24	(0)
- * Club domestic league appearances and goals

Julien Latendresse-Lévesque (born 27 February 1991) is a Canadian soccer player who plays as a goalkeeper for Radefelder SV.

== Early life ==
Latendresse-Lévesque is a native of Chambly, Canada.

== Career ==
Latendresse-Lévesque played for German side Radefelder SV, where he was described as "king transfer of Radefelder SV last winter and immediately shone with great performances in the box".

== Personal life ==
Latendresse-Lévesque has been nicknamed "Latte". He has a son.
