= Uriah Bentick =

Trinidad and Tobago footballer

Personal information
- Full name: Uriah Bentick
- Date of birth: 5 February 1989 (age 37)
- Place of birth: Port of Spain, Trinidad and Tobago
- Height: 6 ft 2 in (1.88 m)
- Position: Defender

Team information
- Current team: Fredericksburg Fire
- Number: 9

College career
Years	Team	Apps	(Gls)
2009–2012	Liberty Flames		

Senior career*
Years	Team	Apps	(Gls)
2013	Wilmington Hammerheads	15	(0)
2014	Carolina RailHawks	4	(0)
2015	Central FC		
2015	Richmond Kickers	6	(0)
2016–2017	Fredericksburg FC		
2022–	Fredericksburg Fire (indoor)	1	(1)

International career
2009	Trinidad and Tobago U20	3	(0)
- * Club domestic league appearances and goals as of 18 January 2022

Uriah Bentick (born 5 February 1989) is a Trinidadian footballer who plays for Fredericksburg Fire FC in Major Arena Soccer League 3.

== Career ==
=== College and amateur ===
Bentick was born in Port of Spain, Trinidad and Tobago, and played four years of college soccer at Liberty University between 2009 and 2012.

=== Professional ===
Bentick was drafted 17th in the 2013 MLS Supplemental Draft by the Philadelphia Union, but did not earn a contract with the team.

Bentick signed with USL Pro club Wilmington Hammerheads in April 2013.

On July 24, 2015, Bentick signed with the Richmond Kickers.
