= Juma Clarence =

Trinidadian international footballer

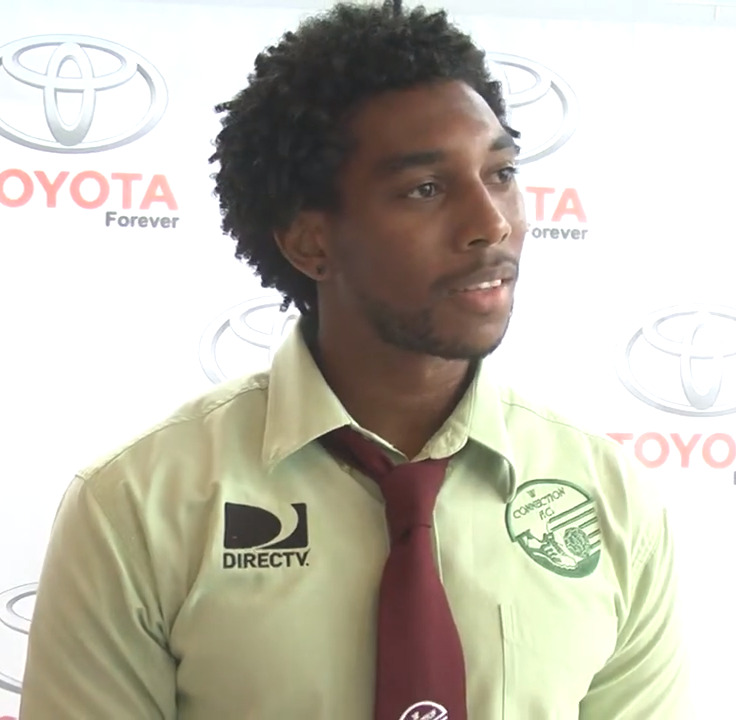
- Clarence in November 2014

Personal information
- Full name: Juma Clarence
- Date of birth: 17 March 1989 (age 37)
- Position: Striker

Team information
- Current team: Caledonia AIA

Senior career*
| Years | Team | Apps | (Gls) |
| 2008–2009 | United Petrotrin | | |
| 2009–2010 | Hacettepe | 5 | (1) |
| 2011–2020 | Caledonia AIA | | |
| 2020– | Police FC | | |

International career^{‡}
| 2010– | Trinidad and Tobago | 2 | (0) |
- * Club domestic league appearances and goals as of 8 September 2011 ‡ National team caps and goals as of 8 September 2011

Juma Clarence (born 17 March 1989) is a Trinidadian international footballer who plays for Police FC, as a striker.

== Career ==
Clarence has played club football for United Petrotrin, Hacettepe and Caledonia AIA.

He made his international debut for Trinidad and Tobago in 2010, having previously appeared in the 2009 FIFA U-20 World Cup.
