= Antonio Salazar (footballer) =

Mexican footballer (1989–2022)

Personal information
- Full name: Antonio Salazar Castillo
- Date of birth: 7 February 1989
- Place of birth: Ciudad Madero, Tamaulipas, Mexico
- Date of death: 8 May 2022 (aged 33)
- Place of death: Tonalá, Jalisco, Mexico
- Height: 1.78 m (5 ft 10 in)
- Position: Forward

Senior career*
Years	Team	Apps	(Gls)
2007–2014	Guadalajara	26	(2)
2010–2011	→ Jaguares (loan)	32	(7)
2012	→ Jaguares (loan)	0	(0)
2013	→ Altamira (loan)	12	(3)
2013–2014	→ Zacatepec (loan)	15	(2)
2014–2015	Santos de Guápiles	21	(4)
2015	Sonora	8	(1)
- * Club domestic league appearances and goals

Antonio Salazar Castillo (7 February 1989 – 8 May 2022) was a Mexican professional footballer who played as a forward.

== Club career ==
=== Guadalajara ===
Salazar made his debut with Chivas on 18 March 2007, against America. This game resulted in a 1–0 victory for America over Chivas. His nickname is "Hulk" because of his strength. Despite having not shown his worthiness at Primera División, he was viewed as Chivas' most promising young forward. Salazar was top scorer at Copa Chivas 2008. He scored his first goal with Chivas, 15 seconds after he subbed in for Omar Bravo.

=== Loan to Jaguares de Chiapas & return to Chivas ===
Salazar signed on loan with Jaguares for the Torneo Bicentenario 2010. After a great performance with Jaguares de Chiapas during Copa Santander Libertadores de America and Clausura 2011, Salazar returned to Chivas de Guadalajara for the Apertura 2011. However, on the Clausura 2012 season, "Hulk" even had minutes with the first team, being on the bench almost all the time.

=== Second loan to Jaguares ===
With the arrival of new coach John van't Schip, Salazar was not considered for Chivas first team, being loaned to Jaguares for a second time. He scored again with Jaguares against Necaxa in the Copa MX game, making the winning goal.

== Death ==
On May 8, 2022, Salazar was found burned inside the trunk of his car between Tonalá and El Salto. The circumstances of his death remain unknown.
