= Denbigh High School (Jamaica) =

Coordinates: 17.9679°N 77.2619°W

- Denbigh, Clarendon; Jamaica

Information
- Funding type: Government of Jamaica
- Established: 1969; 57 years ago
- Educational authority: Ministry of Education
- Principal: Ms. Annett Daley

Denbigh High School (formerly known as Denbigh Junior Secondary School, Denbigh Secondary School and Denbigh Comprehensive High School) is a high school in Denbigh, Clarendon, Jamaica. founded in 1969, seven years after Jamaican independence.

== History ==
Denbigh High School began in 1969 as Denbigh Secondary School with 810 students, drawn from three feeder schools: York Town, Four Paths and Denbigh Primary. Arthur Garson Bryant served as Principal In 1996, the school broadened its reach by introducing tertiary education.
