= Sporting Central Academy F.C. =

Jamaican football club

Sporting Central Academy
- Full name: Sporting Central Academy
- Nickname: Sporting
- Founded: 2000; 26 years ago
- Ground: Riverside Park; Clarendon, Jamaica
- Capacity: 1,000
- League: Clarendon Major League
- 2019–20: 4th
- Website: spcafc.net84.net
Home colours	Away colours

Sporting Central Academy or otherwise known simply as Sporting is a Jamaican football club based in the Clarendon, Jamaica. Sporting Central plays in Clarendon Major League, the third tier of Jamaican football.

== History ==
After the collapse of Galaxy F.C., Brandon Murray and Chris Dawes decided to start a new club in Clarendon to take the parish' place at Jamaica's top tier and in 2000 Sporting Central Academy was formed. They play their home games at Murray's farm, a few miles down the road from May Pen. They finally clinched promotion to the top level in June 2007, under former managers Chris Dawes and Kevin Williams, and are the first team from Clarendon to compete there, since Hazard United's move to St Catherine in 2003.

After Dawes left for the United States in 2009, Donovan Duckie took the reins but left the club in February 2010 after disagreements with Murray. Dawes would then return to manage the team until former assistant Vassell Reynolds was appointed head coach before the start of the 2011/2012 season.

== Stadium ==
From 2000 until 2013, Sporting Central played their home games at BranCourt Sports Ground, Clarendon Park. In 2013, they moved to the neighbouring Jamaican fast food giants Juici Patties Park. For the beginning of the 2017–18 season, Sporting moved into the newly constructed Riverside Park located on the outskirts of the city May Pen

== Achievements ==
- South Central Confederation Super League: 1

2007

== Former managers ==
- (Jamaica) Kevin Williams
- (Jamaica) Christopher Dawes
- (Jamaica) Donovan Duckie
- (Jamaica) Vassell Reynolds
