= Sean de Silva =

Trinidadian footballer (born 1990)

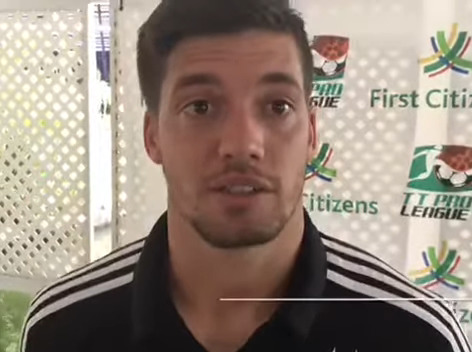
- De Silva in 2017

Personal information
- Full name: Sean de Silva
- Date of birth: 17 January 1990 (age 36)
- Place of birth: Port-of-Spain, Trinidad and Tobago
- Position: Midfielder

Youth career
- 2007: St. Ann's Rangers
- 2008–2012: College of Charleston Cougars

Senior career*
Years	Team	Apps	(Gls)
2013	Minnesota United FC	3	(0)
2014–2017	Central FC		
2018	Queen's Park CC		
2019	Haukar	18	(5)
2020	Njardvík	8	(0)

International career
2007	Trinidad and Tobago U17	2	(0)
2009	Trinidad and Tobago U20	1	(0)
2011–2012	Trinidad and Tobago U23	7	(2)
2009–2016	Trinidad and Tobago	8	(0)
- * Club domestic league appearances and goals as of 20:58, 11 December 2022 (UTC)

Sean de Silva (born 17 January 1990) is a Trinidadian professional footballer.

== Club career ==
Born in Port-of-Spain, De Silva played youth football in his native Trinidad and Tobago for St. Ann's Rangers, before attending the College of Charleston in the United States.

On 2 May 2013, according to a tweet, De Silva signed with NASL club Minnesota United FC.

However following the end of his university education De silva returned to his native country to play for Central Fc.

== International career ==
De Silva played youth international football for Trinidad and Tobago, participating in the 2007 FIFA U-17 World Cup and 2009 FIFA U-20 World Cup. De Silva made his full international debut in March 2009.
