= Diego Estrada (footballer) =

Costa Rican footballer (born 1989)

Personal information
- Full name: Diego Alonso Estrada Valverde
- Date of birth: May 25, 1989 (age 37)
- Place of birth: Alajuela, Costa Rica
- Height: 1.70 m (5 ft 7 in)
- Position: Attacking midfielder

Team information
- Current team: Guadalupe

Youth career
- Alajuelense

Senior career*
Years	Team	Apps	(Gls)
2009–2011	Alajuelense	40	(6)
2011	Real Zaragoza B	12	(2)
2012	Comunicaciones	39	(16)
2013–2015	Saprissa	89	(17)
2016	Melgar	8	(1)
2016–2017	Comunicaciones	43	(6)
2018	Herediano	22	(2)
2018–2019	Grecia	25	(11)
2019	La U Universitarios	10	(0)
2020–2021	Cartaginés	28	(1)
2022–	Guadalupe	0	(0)

International career
2009	Costa Rica U-20	7	(1)
2010	Costa Rica U-21	2	(0)
2012	Costa Rica U-23	2	(1)
2010–2011	Costa Rica	4	(0)
- * Club domestic league appearances and goals as of 20:18, 11 January 2022 (UTC)

Diego Alonso Estrada Valverde (born 25 May 1989) is a Costa Rican footballer who plays for Guadalupe.

== Club career ==
Estrada began his professional career at Costa Rican club Alajuelense. His good performances with Costa Rican U-20 team lead to transfer interest from Benfica and Sporting Lisbon.

On 31 December 2010, Adelaide United announced that they had agreed to terms with Estrada on a 3-year contract, which did not eventuate in the January 2011 transfer window. He then went to Spain to play for Zaragoza in 2011, but only in May 2014 FIFA condemned the Spanish club to pay Alajuelense 486,000 euros for Estrada.

He played for Comunicaciones from Guatemala during 2012 and has signed a one-year contract to play for Deportivo Saprissa from Costa Rica starting 2013.

== International career ==
Estrada played for Costa Rica at U-20 level and was a key player in their CONCACAF Under-20 Championship title win in 2009 where he also scored in the final in a 3-0 demolishing of the United States U-20 team. Estrada then went on to become yet again the key player in his side's campaign at the FIFA U-20 World Cup where they narrowly lost to Brazil national football team in the semi-finals.

He made his senior debut for Costa Rica in a January 2010 friendly match against Argentina and has, as of May 2014, earned a total of 4 caps, scoring no goals.

== Career statistics ==
(Current as of 2 January 2011)

Club	Season	League		Finals/Cup		Continental		International		Total	
Club	Season	Apps	Goals	Apps	Goals	Apps	Goals	Apps	Goals	Apps	Goals
LD Alajuelense	2009–10	17	2	0	0	0	0	0	0	17	2
LD Alajuelense	2010–11	23	4	0	0	0	0	0	0	23	4
Total											
