= Jamaica national football team results (2000–2019) =

This page details the match results and statistics of the Jamaica national football team between 2000 and 2019.

== Key ==
Key to matches

- Att.=Match attendance
- (H)=Home ground
- (A)=Away ground
- (N)=Neutral ground

== Results ==
Jamaica's score is shown first in each case.

Jamaica national football team results
| Date | Venue | Opponents | Score | Competition | Jamaica scorers | Att. | Ref. |
|---|---|---|---|---|---|---|---|
| 16 January 2000 | Guangzhou (N) | New Zealand | 2–1 | 2000 Four Nations Tournament | Whitmore 53', Williams 77' | | |
| 6 February 2000 | George Town (A) | Cayman Islands | 0–0 | Friendly | | | |
| 9 February 2000 | George Town (A) | Cayman Islands | 1–0 | Friendly | Burton | | |
| 12 February 2000 | Miami Orange Bowl, Miami (N) | Colombia | 0–1 | 2000 Gold Cup | | 49,591 | |
| 14 February 2000 | Miami Orange Bowl, Miami (N) | Honduras | 0–2 | 2000 Gold Cup | | 23,795 | |
| 14 May 2000 | Jarrett Park, Montego Bay (H) | Panama | 0–1 | Friendly | | 2,157 | |
| 27 May 2000 | Meadowlands Stadium, East Rutherford (N) | Colombia | 0–1 | Friendly | | 41,609 | |
| 4 June 2000 | Stade Mohammed V, Casablanca (N) | Morocco | 0–1 | 2000 King Hassan II International Cup Tournament | | 40,000 | |
| 6 June 2000 | Stade Mohammed V, Casablanca (N) | Japan | 0–4 | 2000 King Hassan II International Cup Tournament | | 10,000 | |
| 2 July 2000 | Independence Park, Kingston (H) | Cuba | 1–1 | Friendly | Simpson 62' | 13,000 | |
| 5 July 2000 | Independence Park, Kingston (H) | Barbados | 5–0 | Friendly | Johnson 6', Lowe 26', 65', Boyd 70', Marshall 83' | 18,000 | |
| 8 July 2000 | Hasely Crawford Stadium, Port of Spain (A) | Trinidad and Tobago | 4–2 | Basdeao Panday Trophy | Lowe 10', 12', 89', Johnson 62' | 4,000 | |
| 16 July 2000 | Arnos Vale Stadium, Kingstown (A) | Saint Vincent and the Grenadines | 1–0 | 2002 FIFA World Cup qualification | Lowe 23' | 7,000 | |
| 23 July 2000 | Independence Park, Kingston (H) | Honduras | 3–1 | 2002 FIFA World Cup qualification | Whitmore 38', Lowe 68', Burton 71' | 15,500 | |
| 16 August 2000 | Independence Park, Kingston (H) | El Salvador | 1–0 | 2002 FIFA World Cup qualification | Lowe 34' | 20,000 | |
| 27 August 2000 | Truman Bodden Sports Complex, George Town (A) | Cayman Islands | 6–0 | Friendly | Hue 2', Harris 18', 22', 59', Dawes 45', Graham 62' | | |
| 3 September 2000 | Independence Park, Kingston (H) | Saint Vincent and the Grenadines | 2–0 | 2002 FIFA World Cup qualification | Williams 45', Lowe 50' | 30,000 | |
| 8 October 2000 | Estadio Nacional, Tegucigalpa (A) | Honduras | 0–1 | 2002 FIFA World Cup qualification | | 42,000 | |
| 15 November 2000 | Cuscatlán Stadium, San Salvador (A) | El Salvador | 0–2 | 2002 FIFA World Cup qualification | | 3,400 | |
| 26 January 2001 | Miami (N) | Bolivia | 3–0 | Friendly | Lowe 31', Burton 59', Williams 75' | 9,000 | |
| 28 January 2001 | Independence Park, Kingston (H) | Bulgaria | 0–0 | Friendly | | 6,000 | |
| 28 February 2001 | Independence Park, Kingston (H) | Trinidad and Tobago | 1–0 | 2002 FIFA World Cup qualification | Marshall 16' | 34,000 | |
| 25 March 2001 | Estadio Azteca, Mexico City (A) | Mexico | 0–4 | 2002 FIFA World Cup qualification | | 80,000 | |
| 25 April 2001 | Independence Park, Kingston (H) | Honduras | 1–1 | 2002 FIFA World Cup qualification | Gardner 56' | 30,000 | |
| 15 May 2001 | Malabar (N) | Martinique | 1–0 | 2001 Caribbean Cup | Williams 60' | 6,000 | |
| 17 May 2001 | Port of Spain (N) | Trinidad and Tobago | 1–2 | 2001 Caribbean Cup | Harris 27' | 5,500 | |
| 19 May 2001 | Port of Spain (N) | Barbados | 2–1 | 2001 Caribbean Cup | Harris 14' pen., Taylor 27' | 2,000 | |
| 10 June 2001 | Kingston (H) | Cuba | 4–1 | Friendly | Lowe 19', 85' pen., Gardner 32', Williams 38' | | |
| 16 June 2001 | Independence Park, Kingston (H) | United States | 0–0 | 2002 FIFA World Cup qualification | | 35,000 | |
| 20 June 2001 | Estadio Alejandro Morera Soto, Alajuela (A) | Costa Rica | 1–2 | 2002 FIFA World Cup qualification | Lowe 10' | 17,800 | |
| 30 June 2001 | Queen's Park Oval, Port of Spain (A) | Trinidad and Tobago | 2–1 | 2002 FIFA World Cup qualification | Lowe 30', Burton 68' | 4,000 | |
| 20 July 2001 | Havana (A) | Cuba | 0–0 | Friendly | | | |
| 27 July 2001 | Basseterre (N) | Martinique | 0–0 | Friendly | | | |
| 30 July 2001 | Basseterre (A) | Saint Kitts and Nevis | 0–0 | Friendly | | | |
| 1 August 2001 | St. George's (A) | Grenada | 0–2 | Friendly | | | |
| 2 September 2001 | Independence Park, Kingston (H) | Mexico | 1–2 | 2002 FIFA World Cup qualification | Morales 11' o.g. | 35,000 | |
| 5 September 2001 | Estadio Nacional, Tegucigalpa (A) | Honduras | 0–1 | 2002 FIFA World Cup qualification | | 22,000 | |
| 7 October 2001 | Foxboro Stadium, Foxborough (A) | United States | 1–2 | 2002 FIFA World Cup qualification | Lawrence 13' | 40,483 | |
| 11 November 2001 | Independence Park, Kingston (H) | Costa Rica | 0–1 | 2002 FIFA World Cup qualification | | 7,000 | |
| 16 May 2002 | East Rutherford (A) | United States | 0–5 | Friendly | | 30,659 | |
| 18 May 2002 | London (N) | Nigeria | 0–1 | Friendly | | 20,000 | |
| 2 August 2002 | St. George's (A) | Grenada | 1–0 | Friendly | Taylor 31' | | |
| 11 August 2002 | Vieux Fort (A) | Saint Lucia | 3–1 | Friendly | Dean 73', 83', Taylor 78' | 8,000 | |
| 29 August 2002 | Watford (N) | India | 3–0 | Friendly | Anderson 34', Lawrence 72' pen., Goodison 86' | 800 | |
| 1 September 2002 | Wolverhampton (N) | India | 0–0 | Friendly | | 4,020 | |
| 16 October 2002 | Tokyo (A) | Japan | 1–1 | 2002 Kirin Challenge Cup | Fuller 80' | 55,427 | |
| 31 October 2002 | Guatemala City (A) | Guatemala | 1–1 | Friendly | Taylor 61' | 8,000 | |
| 9 November 2002 | St. George's (N) | Barbados | 1–1 | 2003 Gold Cup qualification | Hall 90' | 3,000 | |
| 11 November 2002 | St. George's (N) | Guadeloupe | 2–0 | 2003 Gold Cup qualification | Johnson 56', Hall 59' | 2,500 | |
| 13 November 2002 | St. George's (N) | Grenada | 4–1 | 2003 Gold Cup qualification | Johnson 8', 40', Hall 57', 90' | 8,000 | |
| 20 November 2002 | Lagos (A) | Nigeria | 0–0 | Friendly | | 35,000 | |
| 12 January 2003 | Bridgetown (A) | Barbados | 0–1 | Friendly | | 7,500 | |
| 12 February 2003 | Kingston (H) | United States | 1–2 | Friendly | Lowe 52' | 27,000 | |
| 11 March 2003 | Havana (A) | Cuba | 0–0 | Friendly | | 10,000 | |
| 13 March 2003 | Havana (A) | Cuba | 0–1 | Friendly | | 15,000 | |
| 23 March 2003 | Kingston (H) | Barbados | 2–1 | Friendly | Taylor 20', Daley 78' | 4,000 | |
| 26 March 2003 | Kingston (H) | Saint Lucia | 5–0 | 2003 Gold Cup qualification | Williams 9', Taylor 11', Chin-Sue 37', Davis 56', Daley 62' | 22,000 | |
| 28 March 2003 | Kingston (H) | Martinique | 2–2 | 2003 Gold Cup qualification | Daley 83', Davis 90' | 14,500 | |
| 30 March 2003 | Kingston (H) | Haiti | 3–0 | 2003 Gold Cup qualification | Johnson 15', Daley 58', Pierre 66' o.g. | 7,200 | |
| 2 April 2003 | Caracas (A) | Venezuela | 0–2 | Friendly | | 25,000 | |
| 30 April 2003 | Cape Town (A) | South Africa | 0–0 | Friendly | | 18,000 | |
| 25 May 2003 | Kingston (H) | Nigeria | 3–2 | Friendly | Lowe 25', Johnson 39', Williams 90' | 25,000 | |
| 6 July 2003 | Kingston (H) | Cuba | 1–2 | Friendly | Langley 86' | 8,500 | |
| 9 July 2003 | Kingston (H) | Paraguay | 2–0 | Friendly | Byfield 13', Langley 30' | 10,000 | |
| 13 July 2003 | Miami Orange Bowl, Miami (N) | Colombia | 0–1 | 2003 Gold Cup | | 15,423 | |
| 15 July 2003 | Miami Orange Bowl, Miami (N) | Guatemala | 2–0 | 2003 Gold Cup | Lowe 30', Williams 72' pen. | 10,323 | |
| 20 July 2003 | Estadio Azteca, Mexico City (N) | Mexico | 0–5 | 2003 Gold Cup | | 10,000 | |
| 7 September 2003 | Reading (N) | Australia | 1–2 | Friendly | Lisbie 72' | 8,050 | |
| 12 October 2003 | Leicester (N) | Brazil | 0–1 | Friendly | | 32,000 | |
| 18 February 2004 | Kingston (H) | Uruguay | 2–0 | Friendly | Lowe 10', Johnson 82' | 27,000 | |
| 31 March 2004 | Kingston (H) | Honduras | 2–2 | Friendly | Lowe 8', Davis 53' | 28,000 | |
| 28 April 2004 | Kingston (H) | Venezuela | 2–1 | Friendly | King 10', Williams 45' | 16,000 | |
| 31 May 2004 | London (N) | Nigeria | 0–2 | Unity Cup | | 18,000 | |
| 2 June 2004 | London (N) | Republic of Ireland | 0–1 | Unity Cup | | 6,155 | |
| 12 June 2004 | Miami Orange Bowl, Miami (N) | Haiti | 1–1 | 2006 FIFA World Cup qualification | King 39' | 30,000 | |
| 20 June 2004 | Independence Park, Kingston (H) | Haiti | 3–0 | 2006 FIFA World Cup qualification | King 4', 14', 31' | 22,000 | |
| 18 August 2004 | Independence Park, Kingston (H) | United States | 1–1 | 2006 FIFA World Cup qualification | Goodison 49' | 30,000 | |
| 4 September 2004 | Independence Park, Kingston (H) | Panama | 1–2 | 2006 FIFA World Cup qualification | Ralph 77' | 24,000 | |
| 8 September 2004 | Estadio Cuscatlán, San Salvador (A) | El Salvador | 3–0 | 2006 FIFA World Cup qualification | King 3', 38', Hyde 40' | 25,000 | |
| 2 October 2004 | Fort Lauderdale (N) | Guatemala | 2–2 | Friendly | Hue 88', 90' | 8,500 | |
| 9 October 2004 | Estadio Rommel Fernández, Panama City (A) | Panama | 1–1 | 2006 FIFA World Cup qualification | Whitmore 75' | 16,000 | |
| 13 October 2004 | Independence Park, Kingston (H) | El Salvador | 0–0 | 2006 FIFA World Cup qualification | | 12,000 | |
| 17 November 2004 | Columbus Crew Stadium, Columbus (A) | United States | 1–1 | 2006 FIFA World Cup qualification | Williams 26' pen. | 9,088 | |
| 24 November 2004 | Kingston (H) | Saint Martin | 12–0 | 2005 Caribbean Cup qualification | Dean 2', 11', 30', Hue 10', Shelton 17', 39', 45', 52', Stephenson 18', Scarlett 20', 82', West 54' | 2,600 | |
| 26 November 2004 | Montego Bay (H) | U.S. Virgin Islands | 11–1 | 2005 Caribbean Cup qualification | Shelton 8', Dean 23', 32', Hue 35', 53', 56', Stephenson 40', Williams 50', Davis 64', Bennett 67', Priestly 68' | 4,200 | |
| 28 November 2004 | Kingston (H) | Haiti | 3–1 | 2005 Caribbean Cup qualification | Stephenson 20', Dean 22', Shelton 30' | 4,000 | |
| 12 December 2004 | Vieux Fort (A) | Saint Lucia | 1–1 | 2005 Caribbean Cup qualification | Priestly 42' | 3,000 | |
| 19 December 2004 | Kingston (H) | Saint Lucia | 2–1 | 2005 Caribbean Cup qualification | Dean 1', Hue 67' | 2,500 | |
| 8 January 2005 | Kingston (H) | French Guiana | 5–0 | 2005 Caribbean Cup qualification | Hue 12', Stewart 56', Shelton 63', Scarlett 75', Bennett 84' | 6,500 | |
| 15 January 2005 | Cayenne (A) | French Guiana | 0–0 | 2005 Caribbean Cup qualification | | 500 | |
| 20 February 2005 | Barbados National Stadium, Bridgetown (N) | Trinidad and Tobago | 2–1 | 2005 Caribbean Cup | Shelton 13', Williams 35' | 5,000 | |
| 22 February 2005 | Barbados National Stadium, Bridgetown (N) | Barbados | 1–0 | 2005 Caribbean Cup | Williams 8' | 2,100 | |
| 24 February 2005 | Barbados National Stadium, Bridgetown (N) | Cuba | 1–0 | 2005 Caribbean Cup | Shelton 48' | 3,000 | |
| 20 April 2005 | Atlanta (N) | Guatemala | 1–0 | Friendly | Shelton 14' | 7,000 | |
| 4 June 2005 | Atlanta (N) | Honduras | 0–0 | Friendly | | 6,500 | |
| 8 July 2005 | Home Depot Center, Carson (N) | Guatemala | 4–3 | 2005 Gold Cup | Shelton 3', Fuller 5', Williams 45+1' pen., Hue 57' | 27,000 | |
| 10 July 2005 | Los Angeles Memorial Coliseum, Los Angeles (N) | South Africa | 3–3 | 2005 Gold Cup | Hue 35', Stewart 43', Bennett 80' | 30,710 | |
| 13 July 2005 | Reliant Stadium, Houston (N) | Mexico | 0–1 | 2005 Gold Cup | | 45,311 | |
| 16 July 2005 | Gillette Stadium, Foxborough (N) | United States | 1–3 | 2005 Gold Cup | Fuller 88' | 22,108 | |
| 1 October 2005 | Fort Lauderdale (N) | Guatemala | 2–1 | Friendly | Shelton 41', Crawford 70' | 3,800 | |
| 9 October 2005 | London (N) | Australia | 0–5 | Friendly | | 6,570 | |
| 11 April 2006 | SAS Soccer Park, Cary (A) | United States | 1–1 | Friendly | Bennett 4' | 8,093 | |
| 29 May 2006 | Walkers Stadium, Leicester (N) | Ghana | 1–4 | Friendly | Euell 58' | 11,163 | |
| 3 June 2006 | Old Trafford, Manchester (A) | England | 0–6 | Friendly | | 70,373 | |
| 4 September 2006 | Montreal (A) | Canada | 0–1 | Friendly | | 6,526 | |
| 27 September 2006 | Independence Park, Kingston (H) | Saint Lucia | 4–0 | 2007 Caribbean Cup qualification | Smith 3', Lamey 22', 36', Phillips 31' | 4,000 | |
| 29 September 2006 | Independence Park, Kingston (H) | Saint Vincent and the Grenadines | 1–2 | 2007 Caribbean Cup qualification | Dean 72' | 3,000 | |
| 1 October 2006 | Independence Park, Kingston (H) | Haiti | 2–0 | 2007 Caribbean Cup qualification | Smith 9', Dawkins 31' | 3,000 | |
| 8 October 2006 | Kingston (H) | Canada | 2–1 | Friendly | Shelton 35', Phillips 38' | 5,000 | |
| 15 November 2006 | Kingston (H) | Peru | 1–1 | Friendly | Hue 78' pen. | 10,500 | |
| 22 March 2007 | Lockhart Stadium, Fort Lauderdale (N) | Switzerland | 0–2 | Friendly | | 3,254 | |
| 26 March 2007 | Independence Park, Kingston (H) | Panama | 1–1 | Friendly | Shelton 45' | 8,000 | |
| 5 June 2007 | Independence Park, Kingston (H) | Chile | 0–1 | Friendly | | 15,000 | |
| 21 June 2007 | Gelora Bung Karno Stadium, Jakarta (A) | Indonesia | 1–2 | Friendly | Wolfe 73' | 18,000 | |
| 24 June 2007 | Mỹ Đình National Stadium, Hanoi (A) | Vietnam | 0–3 | Friendly | | | |
| 28 June 2007 | Bukit Jalil National Stadium, Kuala Lumpur (A) | Malaysia | 2–0 | Friendly | Harvey 44', Wolfe 45+2' | 3,000 | |
| 2 July 2007 | Tehran (A) | Iran | 1–8 | Friendly | Taylor 84' | 15,000 | |
| 18 November 2007 | Independence Park, Kingston (H) | El Salvador | 3–0 | Friendly | Austin 33', Gardner 37', 81' | 15,000 | |
| 21 November 2007 | Independence Park, Kingston (H) | Guatemala | 2–0 | Friendly | Fuller 10', Daley 21' | 15,600 | |
| 5 February 2008 | Independence Park, Kingston (H) | Costa Rica | 1–1 | Friendly | Marshall 88' | 30,000 | |
| 26 March 2008 | Independence Park, Kingston (H) | Trinidad and Tobago | 2–2 | Friendly | King 32', Marshall 38' | 19,000 | |
| 4 June 2008 | Independence Park, Kingston (H) | Saint Vincent and the Grenadines | 5–1 | Friendly | Phillips 17', King 26' pen., 42', Burton 74', Gardner 87' | 20,000 | |
| 7 June 2008 | Marvin Lee Stadium, Macoya (A) | Trinidad and Tobago | 1–1 | Friendly | Shelton 90' pen. | 5,000 | |
| 10 June 2008 | Kirani James Stadium, St. George's (A) | Grenada | 1–2 | Friendly | Fuller 20' | - | |
| 15 June 2008 | Independence Park, Kingston (H) | Bahamas | 7–0 | 2010 FIFA World Cup qualification | Gardner 17', Phillips 23', King 34', Shelton 51', 66', Goodison 75', Daley 89' | 20,000 | |
| 18 June 2008 | Trelawny Stadium, Trelawny (H) | Bahamas | 6–0 | 2010 FIFA World Cup qualification | Burton 29', 55', Shelton 35', 37' pen., 42', Marshall 39' | 10,500 | |
| 26 July 2008 | Pizza Hut Park, Frisco (N) | El Salvador | 0–0 | Friendly | | 11,482 | |
| 20 August 2008 | BMO Field, Toronto (A) | Canada | 1–1 | 2010 FIFA World Cup qualification | Williams 52' | 22,000 | |
| 6 September 2008 | Estadio Azteca, Mexico City (A) | Mexico | 0–3 | 2010 FIFA World Cup qualification | | 96,000 | |
| 10 September 2008 | Estadio Olímpico Metropolitano, San Pedro Sula (A) | Honduras | 0–2 | 2010 FIFA World Cup qualification | | 38,000 | |
| 11 October 2008 | Independence Park, Kingston (H) | Mexico | 1–0 | 2010 FIFA World Cup qualification | Fuller 34' | 27,000 | |
| 15 October 2008 | Independence Park, Kingston (H) | Honduras | 1–0 | 2010 FIFA World Cup qualification | Shelton 16' | 25,000 | |
| 9 November 2008 | George Town (A) | Cayman Islands | 2–0 | Friendly | Cummings 42', Dean 58' | 3,000 | |
| 19 November 2008 | Independence Park, Kingston (H) | Canada | 3–0 | 2010 FIFA World Cup qualification | Shelton 28', King 58' pen., Cummings 85' | 28,000 | |
| 3 December 2008 | Kingston (N) | Barbados | 2–1 | 2007 Caribbean Cup | Austin 79', Shelton 84' pen. | 4,000 | |
| 5 December 2008 | Montego Bay (N) | Grenada | 4–0 | 2007 Caribbean Cup | Vernan 6', Shelton 17', Williams 53', Phillips 78' | | |
| 7 December 2008 | Trelawny (N) | Trinidad and Tobago | 1–1 | 2007 Caribbean Cup | Vernan 47' | | |
| 11 December 2008 | Kingston (N) | Guadeloupe | 2–0 | 2007 Caribbean Cup | Thompson 11', Shelton 57' | | |
| 14 December 2008 | Kingston (N) | Grenada | 2–0 | 2007 Caribbean Cup | Shelton 16' pen., 71' pen. | 7,000 | |
| 11 February 2009 | The Den, London (N) | Nigeria | 0–0 | Friendly | | 5,078 | |
| 23 May 2009 | Fort Lauderdale (N) | Haiti | 2–2 | Friendly | Addlery 29', Stewart 88' | 12,000 | |
| 30 May 2009 | Washington D.C. (N) | El Salvador | 0–0 | Friendly | | 30,000 | |
| 7 June 2009 | Kingston (H) | Panama | 3–2 | Friendly | Johnson 44', Hodges 51', Daley 90' | | |
| 28 June 2009 | George Town (A) | Cayman Islands | 4–1 | Friendly | Bayliss 22', Wolfe 43', Daley 68', Morrison 82' | | |
| 3 July 2009 | The Home Depot Center, Carson (N) | Canada | 0–1 | 2009 Gold Cup | | 27,000 | |
| 7 July 2009 | Columbus Crew Stadium, Columbus (N) | Costa Rica | 0–1 | 2009 Gold Cup | | 7,059 | |
| 10 July 2009 | FIU Stadium, Miami (N) | El Salvador | 1–0 | 2009 Gold Cup | Cummings 70' | 17,269 | |
| 13 August 2009 | Giants Stadium, New Jersey (N) | Ecuador | 0–0 | Friendly | | | |
| 16 August 2009 | Basseterre (A) | Saint Kitts and Nevis | 1–0 | Friendly | Hodges 55' | 5,000 | |
| 17 November 2009 | Free State Stadium, Bloemfontein (A) | South Africa | 0–0 | Friendly | | 15,000 | |
| 31 January 2010 | Independence Park, Kingston (H) | Canada | 1–0 | Friendly | Shelton 67' | 14,000 | |
| 10 February 2010 | Estadio José María Minella, Mar del Plata (A) | Argentina | 1–2 | Friendly | Johnson 46' | 20,000 | |
| 28 April 2010 | Bieberer Berg Stadion, Offenbach am Main (N) | South Africa | 0–2 | Friendly | | 562 | |
| 11 August 2010 | Port of Spain (A) | Trinidad and Tobago | 3–1 | Friendly | Richards 8', Austin 33' (pen.), Bryan 52' | 4,550 | |
| 5 September 2010 | Independence Park, Kingston (H) | Costa Rica | 1–0 | Friendly | Johnson 66' | 8,500 | |
| 7 September 2010 | Lockhart Stadium, Fort Lauderdale (N) | Peru | 1–2 | Friendly | Cummings 19' | 5,217 | |
| 10 October 2010 | Independence Park, Kingston (H) | Trinidad and Tobago | 1–0 | Friendly | Richards 19' pen. | 7,000 | |
| 17 November 2010 | Lockhart Stadium, Fort Lauderdale (N) | Costa Rica | 0–0 | Friendly | | 4,000 | |
| 27 November 2010 | Stade En Camée, Rivière-Pilote (N) | Antigua and Barbuda | 3–1 | 2010 Caribbean Cup | Shelton 14', 37', Richards 40' | 3,000 | |
| 29 November 2010 | Stade En Camée, Rivière-Pilote (N) | Guadeloupe | 2–0 | 2010 Caribbean Cup | Francis 53', Johnson 90' | 3,000 | |
| 1 December 2010 | Stade En Camée, Rivière-Pilote (N) | Guyana | 4–0 | 2010 Caribbean Cup | Richards 42', Morgan 48', 74', Vernan 89' | 3,000 | |
| 3 December 2010 | Stade Pierre-Aliker, Fort-de-France (N) | Grenada | 2–1 (a.e.t.) | 2010 Caribbean Cup | Richards 6', Smith 96' | 4,000 | |
| 5 December 2010 | Stade Pierre-Aliker, Fort-de-France (N) | Guadeloupe | 1–1 (a.e.t.) (5–4 p) | 2010 Caribbean Cup | Cummings 32' | 4,000 | |
| 25 March 2011 | Montego Bay Sports Complex, Montego Bay (H) | Venezuela | 0–2 | Friendly | | 6,000 | |
| 29 March 2011 | Estadio Cuscatlán, San Salvador (A) | El Salvador | 3–2 | Friendly | Richards 24', 26', Cummings 53' | 15,000 | |
| 6 June 2011 | The Home Depot Center, Carson (N) | Grenada | 4–0 | 2011 Gold Cup | Shelton 21', Johnson 39', Phillips 79', O. Daley 84' | 21,500 | |
| 10 June 2011 | Riccardo Silva Stadium, Miami (N) | Guatemala | 2–0 | 2011 Gold Cup | Phillips 65', 77' | 18,037 | |
| 13 June 2011 | Red Bull Arena, Harrison (N) | Honduras | 1–0 | 2011 Gold Cup | Johnson 35' | 25,000 | |
| 19 June 2011 | Robert F. Kennedy Memorial Stadium, Washington, D.C. (N) | United States | 0–2 | 2011 Gold Cup | | 45,424 | |
| 10 August 2011 | Olympic Sports Center, Hefei (A) | China | 0–1 | Friendly | | 14,000 | |
| 2 September 2011 | Estadio Olímpico Atahualpa, Quito (A) | Ecuador | 2–5 | Friendly | Cummings 57', Johnson 67' | 2,533 | |
| 6 September 2011 | Lockhart Stadium, Fort Lauderdale (N) | Colombia | 0–2 | Friendly | | 8,000 | |
| 11 October 2011 | Estadio Nilmo Edwards, La Ceiba (A) | Honduras | 1–2 | Friendly | Phillips 45' | 18,000 | |
| 22 February 2012 | Independence Park, Kingston (H) | Cuba | 1–0 | Friendly | James 85' | 10,000 | |
| 24 February 2012 | Montego Bay Sports Complex, Montego Bay (H) | Cuba | 3–0 | Friendly | Johnson 35', Watson 37', Waul 86' | 4,000 | |
| 29 February 2012 | Mt Smart Stadium, Auckland (A) | New Zealand | 3–2 | Friendly | Virgo 38', Stewart 53', Boyd 77' | 15,379 | |
| 21 March 2012 | Independence Park, Kingston (H) | Costa Rica | 0–0 | Friendly | | 10,000 | |
| 18 May 2012 | Montego Bay Sports Complex, Montego Bay (H) | Guyana | 1–0 | Friendly | Lynch 61' | | |
| 27 May 2012 | Independence Park, Kingston (H) | Panama | 0–1 | Friendly | | | |
| 1 June 2012 | Estadio Rommel Fernández, Panama City (A) | Panama | 1–2 | Friendly | Richards 42' | | |
| 8 June 2012 | Independence Park, Kingston (H) | Guatemala | 2–1 | 2014 FIFA World Cup qualification | Phillips 40', Johnson 46' | 14,000 | |
| 12 June 2012 | Sir Vivian Richards Stadium, North Sound (A) | Antigua and Barbuda | 0–0 | 2014 FIFA World Cup qualification | | 8,500 | |
| 15 August 2012 | Robert F. Kennedy Memorial Stadium, Washington D.C. (N) | El Salvador | 2–0 | Friendly | Shelton 16', 65' | 37,000 | |
| 7 September 2012 | Independence Park, Kingston (H) | United States | 2–1 | 2014 FIFA World Cup qualification | Austin 24', Shelton 62' | 25,000 | |
| 11 September 2012 | Columbus Crew Stadium, Columbus (A) | United States | 0–1 | 2014 FIFA World Cup qualification | | 23,881 | |
| 12 October 2012 | Estadio Mateo Flores, Guatemala City (A) | Guatemala | 1–2 | 2014 FIFA World Cup qualification | Shelton 60' pen. | 20,717 | |
| 16 October 2012 | Independence Park, Kingston (H) | Antigua and Barbuda | 4–1 | 2014 FIFA World Cup qualification | Phillips 16', Nosworthy 18', Richards 77', 88' | 8,000 | |
| 8 December 2012 | Sir Vivian Richards Stadium, North Sound (N) | French Guiana | 1–2 | 2012 Caribbean Cup | Stewart 22' | 100 | |
| 10 December 2012 | Sir Vivian Richards Stadium, North Sound (N) | Martinique | 0–0 | 2012 Caribbean Cup | | 225 | |
| 12 December 2012 | Sir Vivian Richards Stadium, North Sound (N) | Cuba | 0–1 | 2012 Caribbean Cup | | 200 | |
| 6 February 2013 | Estadio Azteca, Mexico City (A) | Mexico | 0–0 | 2014 FIFA World Cup qualification | | 43,002 | |
| 22 March 2013 | Independence Park, Kingston (H) | Panama | 1–1 | 2014 FIFA World Cup qualification | Elliott 23' | 25,000 | |
| 26 March 2013 | Estadio Nacional de Costa Rica, San José (A) | Costa Rica | 0–2 | 2014 FIFA World Cup qualification | | 34,427 | |
| 4 June 2013 | Independence Park, Kingston (H) | Mexico | 0–1 | 2014 FIFA World Cup qualification | | 16,483 | |
| 7 June 2013 | Independence Park, Kingston (H) | United States | 1–2 | 2014 FIFA World Cup qualification | Beckford 89' | 12,130 | |
| 11 June 2013 | Estadio Olímpico Metropolitano, San Pedro Sula (A) | Honduras | 0–2 | 2014 FIFA World Cup qualification | | 29,000 | |
| 6 September 2013 | Estadio Rommel Fernández, Panama City, Panama (A) | Panama | 0–0 | 2014 FIFA World Cup qualification | | 20,000 | |
| 10 September 2013 | Independence Park, Kingston (H) | Costa Rica | 1–1 | 2014 FIFA World Cup qualification | Anderson 90+2' | 6,100 | |
| 11 October 2013 | Sporting Park, Kansas City (A) | United States | 0–2 | 2014 FIFA World Cup qualification | | 18,467 | |
| 15 October 2013 | Independence Park, Kingston (H) | Honduras | 2–2 | 2014 FIFA World Cup qualification | Watson 3', Austin 58' pen. | 6,000 | |
| 15 November 2013 | Montego Bay Sports Complex, Montego Bay (H) | Trinidad and Tobago | 0–1 | Friendly | | 4,000 | |
| 19 November 2013 | Hasely Crawford Stadium, Port of Spain (A) | Trinidad and Tobago | 0–2 | Friendly | | 6,000 | |
| 2 March 2014 | Barbados National Stadium, Bridgetown (A) | Barbados | 2–0 | Friendly | Mattocks 76', Brown 82' | 600 | |
| 5 March 2014 | Beausejour Cricket Ground, Gros Islet (A) | Saint Lucia | 5–0 | Friendly | Seaton 21', Mattocks 26', 78', McCleary 40', Brown 88' | | |
| 26 May 2014 | Red Bull Arena, Harrison (N) | Serbia | 1–2 | Friendly | Seaton 53' | 2,000 | |
| 30 May 2014 | Swissporarena, Lucerne (A) | Switzerland | 0–1 | Friendly | | 15,000 | |
| 4 June 2014 | Brisbane Road, London (N) | Egypt | 2–2 | Friendly | Dawkins 27', Grant 38' | 2,203 | |
| 8 June 2014 | Stade Pierre-Mauroy, Villeneuve-d'Ascq (A) | France | 0–8 | Friendly | | 49,600 | |
| 9 September 2014 | BMO Field, Toronto (A) | Canada | 1–3 | Friendly | Lawrence 30' | 12,162 | |
| 10 October 2014 | Denka Big Swan Stadium, Niigata (A) | Japan | 0–1 | Friendly | | 39,628 | |
| 12 November 2014 | Montego Bay Sports Complex, Montego Bay (N) | Martinique | 1–1 | 2014 Caribbean Cup | Mattocks 13' | | |
| 14 November 2014 | Montego Bay Sports Complex, Montego Bay (N) | Antigua and Barbuda | 3–0 | 2014 Caribbean Cup | Lawrence 29', Mattocks 44', Austin 85' | | |
| 16 November 2014 | Montego Bay Sports Complex, Montego Bay (N) | Haiti | 2–0 | 2014 Caribbean Cup | Dawkins 13', Mattocks 20' | | |
| 18 November 2014 | Montego Bay Sports Complex, Montego Bay (N) | Trinidad and Tobago | 0–0 (a.e.t.) (4–3 p) | 2014 Caribbean Cup | | | |
| 27 March 2015 | Montego Bay Sports Complex, Montego Bay (H) | Venezuela | 2–1 | Friendly | Barnes 15', Mattocks 58' | 2,000 | |
| 30 March 2015 | Montego Bay Sports Complex, Montego Bay (H) | Cuba | 3–0 | Friendly | Gordon 1', Parkes 10', Mattocks 34' | | |
| 13 June 2015 | Estadio Regional de Antofagasta, Antofagasta (N) | Uruguay | 0–1 | 2015 Copa América | | 8,653 | |
| 16 June 2015 | Estadio Regional de Antofagasta, Antofagasta (N) | Paraguay | 0–1 | 2015 Copa América | | 6,099 | |
| 20 June 2015 | Estadio Sausalito, Viña del Mar (N) | Argentina | 0–1 | 2015 Copa América | | 21,083 | |
| 8 July 2015 | StubHub Center, Carson (N) | Costa Rica | 2–2 | 2015 Gold Cup | McCleary 13', McAnuff 48' | 22,648 | |
| 11 July 2015 | BBVA Compass Stadium, Houston (N) | Canada | 1–0 | 2015 Gold Cup | Austin 90+2' | 22,017 | |
| 14 July 2015 | BMO Field, Toronto (N) | El Salvador | 1–0 | 2015 Gold Cup | McCleary 72' | 16,674 | |
| 18 July 2015 | M&T Bank Stadium, Baltimore (N) | Haiti | 1–0 | 2015 Gold Cup | Barnes 7' | 37,994 | |
| 22 July 2015 | Georgia Dome, Atlanta (N) | United States | 2–1 | 2015 Gold Cup | Mattocks 31', Barnes 36' | 70,511 | |
| 26 July 2015 | Lincoln Financial Field, Philadelphia (N) | Mexico | 1–3 | 2015 Gold Cup final | Mattocks 80' | 68,930 | |
| 4 September 2015 | Independence Park, Kingston (H) | Nicaragua | 2–3 | 2018 FIFA World Cup qualification | Mattocks 69', Mariappa 78' | | |
| 8 September 2015 | Dennis Martínez National Stadium, Managua (A) | Nicaragua | 2–0 | 2018 FIFA World Cup qualification | Mattocks 13', Dawkins 90' | | |
| 13 October 2015 | Seoul World Cup Stadium, Seoul (A) | South Korea | 0–3 | Friendly | | 28,105 | |
| 13 November 2015 | Independence Park, Kingston (H) | Panama | 0–2 | 2018 FIFA World Cup qualification | | | |
| 17 November 2015 | Stade Sylvio Cator, Port au Prince (A) | Haiti | 1–0 | 2018 FIFA World Cup qualification | Donaldson 64' | 12,155 | |
| 25 March 2016 | Independence Park, Kingston (H) | Costa Rica | 1–1 | 2018 FIFA World Cup qualification | Watson 16' | | |
| 29 March 2016 | Estadio Nacional de Costa Rica, San José (A) | Costa Rica | 0–3 | 2018 FIFA World Cup qualification | | | |
| 27 May 2016 | Estadio Sausalito, Viña del Mar (A) | Chile | 2–1 | Friendly | Donaldson 36', Grant 53' | 22,000 | |
| 5 June 2016 | Soldier Field, Chicago (N) | Venezuela | 0–1 | Copa América Centenario | | 25,560 | |
| 9 June 2016 | Rose Bowl, Pasadena (N) | Mexico | 0–2 | Copa América Centenario | | 83,263 | |
| 13 June 2016 | Levi's Stadium, Santa Clara (N) | Uruguay | 0–3 | Copa América Centenario | | 40,166 | |
| 2 September 2016 | Estadio Rommel Fernández, Panama City (A) | Panama | 0–2 | 2018 FIFA World Cup qualification | | 20,810 | |
| 6 September 2016 | Independence Park, Kingston (H) | Haiti | 0–2 | 2018 FIFA World Cup qualification | | 3,603 | |
| 11 October 2016 | Synthetic Track and Field Facility, Leonora (A) | Guyana | 4–2 (a.e.t.) | 2017 Caribbean Cup qualification | Watson 63', Williams 88', Francis 116', Burke 120' | | |
| 13 November 2016 | Anthony Spaulding Complex, Kingston (H) | Suriname | 1–0 | 2017 Caribbean Cup qualification | Burke 16' | | |
| 3 February 2017 | Finley Stadium, Chattanooga (A) | United States | 0–1 | Friendly | | 17,903 | |
| 16 February 2017 | BBVA Compass Stadium, Houston (N) | Honduras | 1–0 | Friendly | Lowe 72' | 5,000 | |
| 13 June 2017 | Estadio Monumental de la UNSA, Arequipa (A) | Peru | 1–3 | Friendly | Johnson 86' | 40,000 | |
| 22 June 2017 | Stade Pierre-Aliker, Fort-de-France (N) | French Guiana | 1–1 (a.e.t.) (4–2 p) | 2017 Caribbean Cup | Johnson 70' | | |
| 25 June 2017 | Stade Pierre-Aliker, Fort-de-France (N) | Curaçao | 1–2 | 2017 Caribbean Cup | Harriott 82' | | |
| 9 July 2017 | Qualcomm Stadium, San Diego (N) | Curaçao | 2–0 | 2017 Gold Cup | Williams 58', Mattocks 73' | 53,133 | |
| 13 July 2017 | Sports Authority Field, Denver (N) | Mexico | 0–0 | 2017 Gold Cup | | 49,121 | |
| 16 July 2017 | Alamodome, San Antonio (N) | El Salvador | 1–1 | 2017 Gold Cup | Mattocks 64' pen. | 44,232 | |
| 20 July 2017 | University of Phoenix Stadium, Glendale (N) | Canada | 2–1 | 2017 Gold Cup | Francis 6', Williams 50' | 37,404 | |
| 23 July 2017 | Rose Bowl, Pasadena (N) | Mexico | 1–0 | 2017 Gold Cup | Lawrence 88' | 42,393 | |
| 26 July 2017 | Levi's Stadium, Santa Clara (N) | United States | 1–2 | 2017 Gold Cup final | Watson 50' | 63,032 | |
| 24 August 2017 | Hasely Crawford Stadium, Port of Spain (A) | Trinidad and Tobago | 2–1 | Friendly | Hardware 6', Reid 56' | 4,000 | |
| 2 September 2017 | BMO Field, Toronto (A) | Canada | 0–2 | Friendly | | 21,724 | |
| 7 October 2017 | King Abdullah Sports City, Jeddah (A) | Saudi Arabia | 2–5 | Friendly | Hardware 35', Morgan Jr. 68' | 8,226 | |
| 30 January 2018 | Mardan Stadium, Antalya (N) | South Korea | 2–2 | Friendly | Kelly 4', Foster 72' | 100 | |
| 25 March 2018 | Sabina Park, Kingston (H) | Antigua and Barbuda | 1–1 | Friendly | Thomas 50' o.g. | 3,000 | |
| 26 April 2018 | Warner Park Sporting Complex, Basseterre (A) | Saint Kitts and Nevis | 3–1 | Friendly | Springer 22' o.g., Reid 24', Marsh 36' | | |
| 28 April 2018 | Sir Vivian Richards Stadium, North Sound (A) | Antigua and Barbuda | 2–0 | Friendly | Vassell 43', Lawes 78' | 1,500 | |
| 17 August 2018 | Kirani James Stadium, St. George's (A) | Grenada | 5–1 | Friendly | Green 12', Vassell 20', 48', St. John 59' o.g., Marsh 71' | | |
| 20 August 2018 | Wildey Astro Turf, Bridgetown (A) | Barbados | 2–2 | Friendly | Morgan Jr. 80', Vassell 84' pen. | | |
| 7 September 2018 | Red Bull Arena, Harrison (N) | Ecuador | 0–2 | Friendly | | | |
| 9 September 2018 | Independence Park, Kingston (H) | Cayman Islands | 4–0 | 2019–20 Nations League qualification | Mattocks 2', 58', Burke 35', 66' | | |
| 14 October 2018 | Ergilio Hato Stadium, Willemstad (N) | Bonaire | 6–0 | 2019–20 Nations League qualification | Burke 14', Morris 43', 510', Gordon 47', Vassell 57', Kelly 80' | | |
| 17 November 2018 | Montego Bay Sports Complex, Montego Bay (H) | Suriname | 2–1 | 2019–20 Nations League qualification | Burke 7', Mattocks 16' pen. | | |
| 23 March 2019 | Estadio Cuscatlán, San Salvador (A) | El Salvador | 0–2 | 2019–20 Nations League qualification | | | |
| 26 March 2019 | Estadio Nacional de Costa Rica, San José (A) | Costa Rica | 0–1 | Friendly | | | |
| 5 June 2019 | Audi Field, Washington, D.C. (A) | United States | 1–0 | Friendly | Nicholson 60' | 17,719 | |
| 17 June 2019 | Independence Park, Kingston (H) | Honduras | 3–2 | 2019 CONCACAF Gold Cup | Orgill 15', 41', Lowe 56' | 17,874 | |
| 21 June 2019 | BBVA Stadium, Houston (N) | El Salvador | 0–0 | 2019 CONCACAF Gold Cup | | 22,395 | |
| 25 June 2019 | Banc of California Stadium, Los Angeles (N) | Curaçao | 1–1 | 2019 CONCACAF Gold Cup | Nicholson 14' | 22,503 | |
| 30 June 2019 | Lincoln Financial Field, Philadelphia (N) | Panama | 1–0 | 2019 CONCACAF Gold Cup | Mattocks 75' pen. | 26,233 | |
| 3 July 2019 | Nissan Stadium, Nashville (N) | United States | 1–3 | 2019 CONCACAF Gold Cup | Nicholson 69' | 28,473 | |
| 6 September 2019 | Montego Bay Sports Complex, Montego Bay (H) | Antigua and Barbuda | 6–0 | 2019–20 Nations League B | Nicholson 9', 51', De Cordova-Reid 31', Brown 67', Bailey 77', Vassell 81' | | |
| 9 September 2019 | Synthetic Track and Field Facility, Leonora (A) | Guyana | 4–0 | 2019–20 Nations League B | Powell 14', 26', Orgill 44', 54' | | |
| 12 October 2019 | Independence Park, Kingston (H) | Aruba | 2–0 | 2019–20 Nations League B | Williams 13', Nicholson 88' | | |
| 15 October 2019 | Ergilio Hato Stadium, Willemstad (N) | Aruba | 6–0 | 2019–20 Nations League B | Willis 7', Foster 17', 53', Walker 19', Nicholson 34', Flemmings 47' | | |
| 15 November 2019 | Sir Vivian Richards Stadium, North Sound (A) | Antigua and Barbuda | 2–0 | 2019–20 Nations League B | Willis 34', Morris 58' | | |
| 18 November 2019 | Montego Bay Sports Complex, Montego Bay (H) | Guyana | 1–1 | 2019–20 Nations League B | East 50' | | |
