= 2010 Caribbean Cup =

Digicel Caribbean Cup 2010

Tournament details
- Host country: Martinique
- Dates: 2 October – 5 December
- Teams: 23 (from 1 confederation)
- Venues: 8 (in 8 host cities)

Final positions
- Champions: Jamaica (5th title)
- Runners-up: Guadeloupe
- Third place: Cuba
- Fourth place: Grenada

Tournament statistics
- Matches played: 16
- Goals scored: 30 (1.88 per match)
- Top scorer(s): (Grenada) Kithson Bain (Jamaica) Dane Richards (3 goals each)

Alternate logo.

The 2010 Caribbean Cup (also known as Digicel Caribbean Cup 2010 for sponsorship reasons) was the 2010 edition of the Caribbean Championship, an international football championship for national teams affiliated with the Caribbean Football Union (CFU) of the CONCACAF region. The final stage was hosted by Martinique. Martinique were selected as hosts over fellow bidders Guadeloupe and Barbados. The competition was originally scheduled to begin on 18 August with the final match taking place on 28 November. However, at the beginning of August 2010, the CFU released a different schedule that showed the competition being postponed until 2 October. Also, the Bahamas pulled out of the competition, leaving 23 teams. The groups were changed, allowing Cuba and Antigua and Barbuda to get a bye to the second qualifying round at the expense of Guyana and the Netherlands Antilles.

The top four teams qualified for the 2011 CONCACAF Gold Cup.

== Participants ==
A total of 23 entered into the tournament. Aruba had initially entered but withdrew shortly before the tournament began, dropping the total from the initial 24 entrants. Seven CFU teams – Aruba, Bahamas, Bermuda, French Guiana, Sint Maarten, Turks and Caicos Islands, and United States Virgin Islands – did not enter, meaning two more participants than in the 2008 edition. Martinique and Jamaica were given byes into the tournament proper as hosts and title holders, respectively. The six highest-ranking teams – Grenada, Guadeloupe, Cuba, Haiti, Trinidad and Tobago, and Antigua and Barbuda – based on the results of the 2008 tournament, were given byes into the second qualifying round. All remaining entrants – Anguilla, Barbados, British Virgin Islands, Cayman Islands, Dominica, Dominican Republic, Guyana, Montserrat, Netherlands Antilles, Puerto Rico, Saint Kitts and Nevis, Saint Lucia, Saint Martin, Saint Vincent and the Grenadines, and Suriname – were drawn into the first qualifying round.

Seeding and bye allocation
Seed	Team	Bye	Notes
1	Martinique	Final group stage	2010 hosts
2	Jamaica	Final group stage	Title holders
3	Grenada	Second preliminary round	Runner-up
4	Guadeloupe	Second preliminary round	Third place
5	Cuba	Second preliminary round	Fourth place
6	Trinidad and Tobago	Second preliminary round	Eliminated in group stage with 4 points
7	Haiti	Second preliminary round	Eliminated in group stage with 4 points
8	Antigua and Barbuda	Second preliminary round	Eliminated in group stage with 2 points
9	Barbados	No bye awarded	Eliminated in group stage with 0 points

== Qualification ==
The qualifying competition for the 2010 Caribbean Championship was held from 2 October to 14 November 2010 to determine the qualifying teams for the final tournament. 21 teams competed, with six qualifying to join hosts Martinique and title holders Jamaica. The competition was played over two rounds, with the second through seventh highest-ranked teams from the 2008 Caribbean Championship given byes to the second round.

== Squads ==
At least 30 days prior to the tournament, all teams competing in the final tournament were required to provide a provisional list of between 20 and 30 players. 10 days prior, the teams were required to finalize a list of 20 players for the tournament.

== Group stage ==
The final round was contested in Martinique from 26 November – 5 December. It consisted of two groups of four, and the top two teams from each group progressed to the semifinals. Jamaica and Martinique automatically qualified for the final group stage as title holder and host, respectively.

=== Group H ===
Team	Pld	W	D	L	GF	GA	GD	Pts
Cuba	3	2	1	0	3	0	+3	7
Grenada	3	1	2	0	2	1	+1	5
Trinidad and Tobago	3	1	0	2	1	3	−2	3
Martinique	3	0	1	2	1	3	−2	1

26 November 2010
18:00 UTC−04:00

Trinidad and Tobago	0–2	Cuba
	Report	J. Colomé 23'; Linares 79'

Stade Pierre-Aliker, Fort-de-France
Attendance: 5,000
Referee: Stanley Lancaster (Guyana)
26 November 2010
20:30 UTC−04:00

Martinique	1–1	Grenada
Goron 79' (pen.)	Report	Bain 29'

Stade Pierre-Aliker, Fort-de-France
Attendance: 6,000
Referee: Raymond Bogle (Jamaica)

28 November 2010
16:00 UTC−04:00

Grenada	1–0	Trinidad and Tobago
Bain 69'	Report

Stade Pierre-Aliker, Fort-de-France
Attendance: 500
Referee: Hugo Cruz (Costa Rica)
28 November 2010
18:30 UTC−04:00

Martinique	0–1	Cuba
	Report	Márquez 28'

Stade Pierre-Aliker, Fort-de-France
Attendance: 500
Referee: Trevor Taylor (Barbados)

30 November 2010
18:00 UTC−04:00

Cuba	0–0	Grenada
	Report

Stade Pierre-Aliker, Fort-de-France
Attendance: 2,000
Referee: Raymond Bogle (Jamaica)
30 November 2010
20:30 UTC−04:00

Martinique	0–1	Trinidad and Tobago
	Report	Hector 47'

Stade Pierre-Aliker, Fort-de-France
Attendance: 2,000
Referee: Trevor Taylor (Barbados)

=== Group I ===
Team	Pld	W	D	L	GF	GA	GD	Pts
Jamaica	3	3	0	0	9	1	+8	9
Guadeloupe	3	1	1	1	2	3	−1	4
Antigua and Barbuda	3	1	0	2	2	4	−2	3
Guyana	3	0	1	2	1	6	−5	1

27 November 2010
17:00 UTC−04:00

Guyana	1–1	Guadeloupe
D. Jacobs 86'	Report	Loval 70'

Stade En Camée, Rivière-Pilote
Attendance: 2,500
Referee: Lee Davis (Trinidad and Tobago)
27 November 2010
19:30 UTC−04:00

Jamaica	3–1	Antigua and Barbuda
Shelton 14', 37'; Richards 40'	Report	Gregory 48'

Stade En Camée, Rivière-Pilote
Attendance: 3,000
Referee: Enrico Wijngaarde (Suriname)

29 November 2010
18:00 UTC−04:00

Antigua and Barbuda	1–0	Guyana
Gregory 69'	Report

Stade En Camée, Rivière-Pilote
Attendance: 3,000
Referee: Enrico Wijngaarde (Suriname)
29 November 2010
20:30 UTC−04:00

Guadeloupe	0–2	Jamaica
	Report	Francis 53'; Johnson 90+3'

Stade En Camée, Rivière-Pilote
Attendance: 3,000
Referee: Walter López (Guatemala)

1 December 2010
18:00 UTC−04:00

Guadeloupe	1–0	Antigua and Barbuda
Lambourde 41'	Report

Stade En Camée, Rivière-Pilote
Attendance: 3,000
Referee: Walter López (Guatemala)
1 December 2010
20:30 UTC−04:00

Guyana	0–4	Jamaica
	Report	Richards 42'; Morgan 49', 75'; Vernan 90'

Stade En Camée, Rivière-Pilote
Attendance: 3,000
Referee: Hugo Cruz (Costa Rica)

== Knockout phase ==
Semi-finals
Cuba	1
Guadeloupe	2
Jamaica (aet)	2
Grenada	1

Final
Guadeloupe	1 (4)
Jamaica (pen)	1 (5)
Third place
Cuba	1
Grenada	0

=== Semi-finals ===
3 December 2010
17:30 UTC−04:00

Cuba	1–2	Guadeloupe
R. Fernández 34'	Report	Gendrey 55' (pen.); Lambourde 78'

Stade Pierre-Aliker, Fort-de-France
Attendance: 2,000
Referee: Enrico Wijngaarde (Suriname)

3 December 2010
20:30 UTC−04:00

Jamaica	2–1 (a.e.t.)	Grenada
Richards 7'; Smith 96'	Report	Bain 13'

Stade Pierre-Aliker, Fort-de-France
Attendance: 4,000
Referee: Trevor Taylor (Barbados)

=== Third Place Playoff ===
5 December 2010
16:00 UTC−04:00

Grenada	0–1	Cuba
	Report	Linares 12'

Stade Pierre-Aliker, Fort-de-France
Attendance: 4,000
Referee: Walter López (Guatemala)

=== Final ===
5 December 2010
19:00 UTC−04:00

Guadeloupe	1–1 (a.e.t.)	Jamaica
Gotin 37'	Report	Cummings 32'
Penalties
Clavier (penalty scored); Gendrey (penalty scored); Collet (penalty scored); Antoine-Curier (penalty scored); Lambourde (penalty missed)	4–5	(penalty scored) Austin; (penalty scored) Shelton; (penalty scored) Woodbine; (penalty scored) Vernan; (penalty scored) Smith

Stade Pierre-Aliker, Fort-de-France
Attendance: 4,000
Referee: Enrico Wijngaarde (Suriname)

2010 Caribbean Cup
winner

Jamaica
Fifth title

== Goalscorers ==
3 goals

- (Grenada) Kithson Bain
- (Jamaica) Dane Richards

2 goals

- (Antigua and Barbuda) Gayson Gregory
- (Cuba) Roberto Linares
- (Guadeloupe) Jean-Luc Lambourde
- (Jamaica) Marvin Morgan, Jr.
- (Jamaica) Luton Shelton

1 goal

- (Cuba) Jaime Colomé
- (Cuba) Reysander Fernández
- (Cuba) Yénier Márquez
- (Guadeloupe) Grégory Gendrey
- (Guadeloupe) Ludovic Gotin
- (Guadeloupe) Loïc Loval
- (Guyana) Dwain Jacobs
- (Jamaica) Omar Cummings
- (Jamaica) Shaun Francis
- (Jamaica) Ryan Johnson
- (Jamaica) Troy Smith
- (Jamaica) Eric Vernan
- (Martinique) José-Thierry Goron
- (Trinidad and Tobago) Hughton Hector
