= Junior Williams (footballer) =

Grenadian footballer

Personal information
- Full name: Junior Cyrus Williams
- Date of birth: 3 November 1987 (age 38)
- Place of birth: St George's, Grenada
- Height: 1.80 m (5 ft 11 in)
- Position: Left midfielder

Senior career*
Years	Team	Apps	(Gls)
2008–2018	Queens Park Rangers SC		

International career
- Grenada U20
2008-2012	Grenada	14	(0)
Medal record
Men's football
Representing Grenada
Caribbean Cup
Runner-up	2008 Jamaica
- * Club domestic league appearances and goals

Junior Williams (born 3 November 1987) is a Grenadian football player who played as a left midfielder for the Grenada national football team.

He was an injury replacement for Kithson Bain in the 2011 CONCACAF Gold Cup, and played in two matches.

== Personal life ==
Williams is the cousin of Shalrie Joseph.

== Honours ==
Grenada

- Caribbean Cup: runner-up 2008
