= Cassim Langaigne =

Grenadian footballer

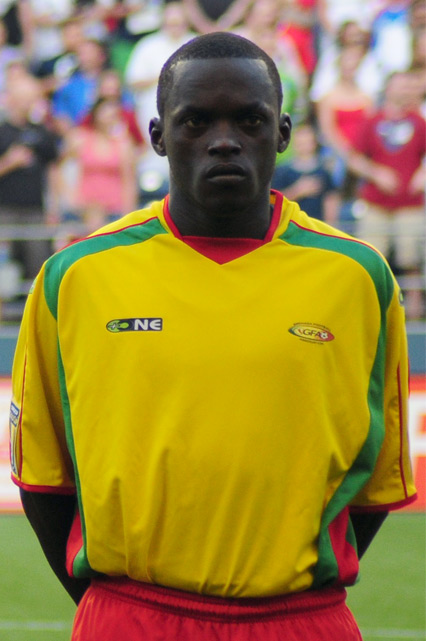
- Langaigne with Grenada in 2009

Personal information
- Date of birth: 27 February 1980 (age 46)
- Place of birth: Victoria, Grenada
- Height: 1.67 m (5 ft 5 1/2 in)
- Position: Defender

Senior career*
Years	Team	Apps	(Gls)
2004–2022	Hurricanes SC		

International career^{‡}
2004–2016	Grenada	72	(5)
Medal record
Men's football
Representing Grenada
Caribbean Cup
Runner-up	2008 Jamaica
- * Club domestic league appearances and goals ‡ National team caps and goals as of 29 March 2016

Cassim Langaigne (born 27 February 1980) is a former Grenadian footballer who played as a midfielder for the Grenada national football team. He is the most capped player of his country with 72 caps.

== Honours ==
Grenada

- Caribbean Cup: runner-up 2008
