= Jaime Colomé =

Cuban footballer (born 1979)

Personal information
- Full name: Jaime Colomé Valencia
- Date of birth: June 30, 1979 (age 47)
- Place of birth: Havana, Cuba
- Height: 1.73 m (5 ft 8 in)
- Position: Midfielder

Senior career*
Years	Team	Apps	(Gls)
2000–2015	Ciudad de la Habana		
2016–2017	Parham		

International career^{‡}
2002–2013	Cuba	82	(11)
- * Club domestic league appearances and goals as of 22 February 2008 ‡ National team caps and goals as of 8 January 2018

Jaime Colomé Valencia (born June 30, 1979 in Havana) is a Cuban retired footballer.

== Club career ==
Colomé played most of his career as a midfielder for Ciudad La Habana. He played the 2016/17 season at Parham in Antigua and Barbuda alongside compatriots Odelin Molina and Hensy Muñoz and brother Yoel Colomé.

== International career ==
A national team stalwart for over 12 years, Colomé made his debut for Cuba in a November 2002 Gold Cup qualification match against the Cayman Islands. He was a squad member at the 2003, 2005 and 2007 Gold Cup Finals. He has earned a total of 82 caps, scoring 11 goals and represented his country in 13 FIFA World Cup qualifying matches.

His final international was a July 2013 CONCACAF Gold Cup match against Panama.

=== International goals ===
Scores and results list Cuba's goal tally first.

Number	Date	Venue	Opponent	Score	Result	Competition
1	March 18, 2004	Estadio Pedro Marrero, Havana, Cuba	Panama	1-0	3-0	Friendly match
2	September 4, 2006	Estadio Pedro Marrero, Havana, Cuba	Bahamas	2-0	6-0	2007 Caribbean Cup
3	September 6, 2006	Estadio Pedro Marrero, Havana, Cuba	Cayman Islands	6-0	7-0	2007 Caribbean Cup
4	November 10, 2006	Stade d'Honneur de Dillon, Fort-de-France, Martinique	Suriname	3-0	3-1	2007 Caribbean Cup
5	June 10, 2007	Giants Stadium, East Rutherford, United States	Panama	1-1	2-2	2007 CONCACAF Gold Cup
6	17 June 2008	Sir Vivian Richards Stadium, St. John's, Antigua and Barbuda	Antigua and Barbuda	1-1	4-3	2010 FIFA World Cup qualification
7	17 June 2008	Sir Vivian Richards Stadium, St. John's, Antigua and Barbuda	Antigua and Barbuda	3-2	4-3	2010 FIFA World Cup qualification
8	October 15, 2008	Estadio Pedro Marrero, Havana, Cuba	Guatemala	1-0	2-1	2010 FIFA World Cup Qualification
9	23 October 2008	Estadio Pedro Marrero, Havana, Cuba	Netherlands Antilles	5-1	7-1	2008 Caribbean Cup qualification
10	6 December 2008	Greenfield Stadium, Trelawny, Jamaica	Antigua and Barbuda	3–0	3–0	2008 Caribbean Cup
11	26 November 2010	Stade Pierre-Aliker, Fort-de-France, Martinique	Trinidad and Tobago	1-0	2-0	2010 Caribbean Cup

== Personal life ==
His brother Yoel also played for the national team.
