= Roberto Linares =

Cuban footballer

Personal information
- Full name: Roberto Linares Balmaseda
- Date of birth: February 10, 1986 (age 40)
- Place of birth: Zulueta, Cuba
- Height: 1.69 m (5 ft 7 in)
- Position: Forward

Senior career*
Years	Team	Apps	(Gls)
2005–2014	Villa Clara		
2015–2018	All Boys		

International career^{‡}
2008–2012	Cuba	42	(14)
- * Club domestic league appearances and goals ‡ National team caps and goals as of 1 January 2018

Roberto Linares Balmaseda (born February 10, 1986) is a football forward from Cuba playing currently for Argentine side All Boys.

== Club career ==
A powerful and pacy striker, Linares played for his provincial side Villa Clara. He was the Cuban league's top goalscorer in 2012. He joined Argentine side All Boys alongside compatriot José Dairo Macías in summer 2015.

== International career ==
He made his international debut for Cuba in a February 2008 friendly match against Guyana and has earned a total of 42 caps, scoring 14 goals. He represented his country in 12 FIFA World Cup qualification matches (4 goals) and played at the 2011 CONCACAF Gold Cup.

His final international was a December 2012 Caribbean Cup match against Trinidad & Tobago.

=== International goals ===
#	Date	Venue	Opponent	Score	Result	Competition
1	7 June 2008	Estadio Pedro Marrero, Havana, Cuba	Saint Vincent and the Grenadines	1-0	1-0	Friendly match
2	17 June 2008	Sir Vivian Richards Stadium, St. John's, Antigua and Barbuda	Antigua and Barbuda	2-2	4-3	2010 FIFA World Cup qualification
3	22 June 2008	Estadio Pedro Marrero, Havana, Cuba	Antigua and Barbuda	1-0	4-0	2010 FIFA World Cup qualification
4	22 June 2008	Estadio Pedro Marrero, Havana, Cuba	Antigua and Barbuda	3-0	4-0	2010 FIFA World Cup qualification
5	10 September 2008	Estadio Mateo Flores, Guatemala City, Guatemala	Guatemala	1-0	1-4	2010 FIFA World Cup qualification
5	23 October 2008	Estadio Pedro Marrero, Havana, Cuba	Netherlands Antilles	3-0	7-1	2008 Caribbean Cup qualification
7	23 October 2008	Estadio Pedro Marrero, Havana, Cuba	Netherlands Antilles	7-1	7-1	2008 Caribbean Cup qualification
8	27 October 2008	Estadio Pedro Marrero, Havana, Cuba	Suriname	4-0	6-0	2008 Caribbean Cup qualification
9	4 December 2008	Jarrett Park, Montego Bay, Jamaica	Guadeloupe	2–1	2–1	2008 Caribbean Cup
10	6 December 2008	Greenfield Stadium, Trelawny, Jamaica	Antigua and Barbuda	2–0	3–0	2008 Caribbean Cup
11	11 December 2008	Independence Park, Kingston, Jamaica	Grenada	2–1	2–2	2008 Caribbean Cup
12	26 November 2010	Stade Pierre-Aliker, Fort-de-France, Martinique	Trinidad and Tobago	2-0	2-0	2010 Caribbean Cup
13	5 December 2010	Stade Pierre-Aliker, Fort-de-France, Martinique	Grenada	1-0	1-0	2010 Caribbean Cup
14	16 November 2012	Dwight Yorke Stadium, Bacolet, Trinidad and Tobago	Saint Vincent and the Grenadines	1-1	1-1	2012 Caribbean Cup qualification
