= Odelín Molina =

Cuban footballer (born 1974)

Personal information
- Full name: Odelín Molina Hernández
- Date of birth: 3 August 1974 (age 52)
- Place of birth: Santa Clara, Cuba
- Position: Goalkeeper

Senior career*
| Years | Team | Apps | (Gls) |
| 1993–2015 | FC Villa Clara | | |
| 2016–2017 | Parham | | |

International career
| 1996–2013 | Cuba | 122 | (0) |
- * Club domestic league appearances and goals

Odelín Molina Hernández (born 3 August 1974) is a Cuban former footballer who played as a goalkeeper for FC Villa Clara and Antiguan side Parham.

He is the Cuba national team's second most capped player of all-time, behind Yénier Márquez.

== Club career ==
Born in Santa Clara, Molina played club football for his provincial team FC Villa Clara. He played the 2016–17 season at Parham in Antigua and Barbuda alongside compatriots Jaime Colomé and Hensy Muñoz and Jaime's brother Yoel Colomé.

== International career ==
Molina made his international debut for Cuba in a May 1996 FIFA World Cup qualification match against the Cayman Islands and has earned a total of 122 caps. including 28 FIFA World Cup qualifying matches. He also played at six CONCACAF Gold Cup final tournaments.

His final international was a July 2013 CONCACAF Gold Cup match against Panama, after he announced he would retire from international football after the tournament.

== Honours ==
Cuba

- Caribbean Cup: 2012

== See also ==
- List of men's footballers with 100 or more international caps
