= Luton Shelton =

Jamaican footballer (1985–2021)

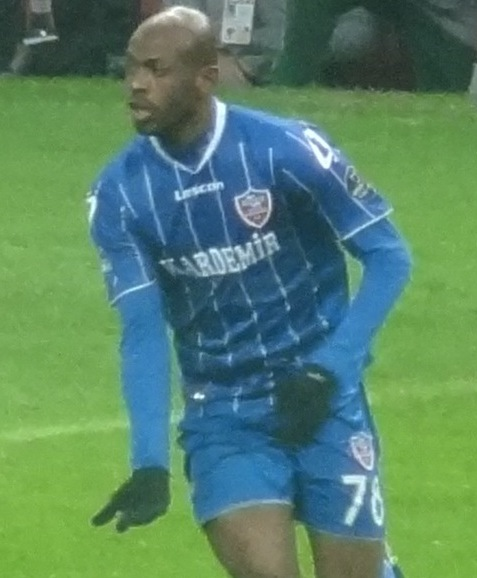
- Shelton playing for Karabükspor in 2012

Personal information
- Full name: Luton George Kieshawn Shelton
- Date of birth: 11 November 1985
- Place of birth: Kingston, Jamaica
- Date of death: 22 January 2021 (aged 35)
- Place of death: Kingston, Jamaica
- Height: 1.81 m (5 ft 11 in)
- Positions: Winger; striker

Senior career*
| Years | Team | Apps | (Gls) |
| 2003–2006 | Harbour View | 43 | (44) |
| 2006–2007 | Helsingborgs IF | 19 | (9) |
| 2007–2008 | Sheffield United | 19 | (1) |
| 2008–2011 | Vålerenga | 58 | (17) |
| 2009–2010 | → Aalborg BK (loan) | 11 | (1) |
| 2011–2013 | Karabükspor | 47 | (10) |
| 2013–2015 | Volga Nizhny Novgorod | 23 | (2) |
| 2017–2018 | Harbour View | 1 | (1) |
| Total | | 221 | (85) |

International career
| 2004–2013 | Jamaica | 75 | (35) |
- * Club domestic league appearances and goals

Luton George Kieshawn Shelton (11 November 1985 – 22 January 2021) was a Jamaican professional footballer who played as a striker or winger. At the time of his death, he was the top scorer for the Jamaica national team with 35 goals. He is also the only men's football player to score four goals in his international debut (2004). He earned 75 caps for Jamaica, and played at three CONCACAF Gold Cups.

Shelton attended Wolmer's Schools and began his career in the youth system of Harbour View. In his international club career, he was part of championship sides in the 2006 Svenska Cupen and the 2008 Norwegian Cup. He also played in the United Kingdom, Denmark, Turkey, and Russia.

== Club career ==
=== Harbour View ===
Shelton started his career in the Harbour View youth system before becoming a first regular by the age of 18. While at Harbour View he won the CFU Club Championship and the National Premier League. He was also recognised as youth player of the year during his tenure.

=== Helsingborg ===
In August 2005 Shelton was due to move to Football League Championship club Burnley after a successful pre-season trial. They attempted to sign Shelton, but a work permit was rejected, and in August 2006 he joined Helsingborg for about £100,000. During the 2006 season, he scored nine goals in 19 games in the Swedish Allsvenskan, despite playing only irregularly due to repeated injuries. He scored a total of 17 goals in 28 competitive matches, including five goals in four Swedish Cup matches on the way to Helsingborg's victory in the competition. His 120th-minute equaliser against to-be league champions Elfsborg in the quarter-final, which Helsingborg won 5–3 after a penalty shootout (4–4 after extra time), and the 1–0 goal in the final against Gefle, were two of his highlights at the club.

=== Sheffield United ===
Despite being signed amidst much fanfare, Shelton did not make his full début until April 2007 in a 2–0 loss to Manchester United at Old Trafford. He made only three more appearances for the Blades in the Premiership that season as they unsuccessfully battled to avoid relegation.

With the arrival of James Beattie and Billy Sharp at Bramall Lane during the close season he found games no more easy to come by under new manager Bryan Robson. Initially limited to cup appearances, he scored his first competitive goals for the club, netting twice in a 5–0 League Cup win over Morecambe in September 2007.

As the team struggled he began to see more first team action, but was unable to turn appearances into goals, scoring only twice more that season, against Manchester City in the FA Cup and Colchester in the league. With the arrival of new manager Kevin Blackwell Shelton was sidelined once more.

=== Vålerenga ===
On 24 July 2008, it was announced that Shelton had been sold to Norwegian side Vålerenga, playing in the Tippeligaen, for around £1m (10m kr). His contract was to last to the end of the 2011 season. Shelton made his debut on 2 August, scoring his side's lone goal in a 1–1 game at home against Fredrikstad FK. He was considered an attacking player with a speed advantage: he was the fastest player to run a 40m sprint in the Tippeligaen. He played in the 2008 Norwegian Cup, and was one of their top scorers in the 2010 Tippeligaen season with 12 goals.

Shelton spent the 2009–10 season on loan to the Danish side Aalborg BK, playing 11 games. He was part of their squad for the 2008–09 UEFA Cup.

=== Karabükspor and Volga Nizhny Novgorod ===
On 4 August 2011, Shelton was transferred to Karabükspor. He played for two years, and chose to retain his jersey number 78 when he moved.

In 2013, Shelton moved to Volga Nizhny Novgorod in Russia. The club suffered from financial issues during this period, and frequently missed payments to the players.

=== Harbour View return ===
In April 2015, Shelton went on trial with MLS side Colorado Rapids. Shelton returned to Harbour View at the beginning of 2017, after being out of the game for two years with injury, scoring in his first match on his return. This match was his last before retirement.

== International career ==
Shelton was capped at the U-17, U-20, U-23 and national levels for Jamaica. He scored his 25th goal for Jamaica vs Guadeloupe. He is the only man to score four goals on his international début. In June 2008 he scored five goals in two 2010 FIFA World Cup qualifying games for Jamaica against the Bahamas. Later the same month, he scored two goals as Jamaica won 7–0 and scored a hat-trick as Jamaica won 6–0. Shelton was also the top goal scorer in 2010 CONCACAF World Cup qualification matches with seven goals. On 31 January 2010, Shelton scored in a friendly match against Canada to equal Paul Young as Jamaica's all-time leading goalscorer with 28 goals. On 27 November 2010, Shelton became Jamaica's all-time leader scorer with 30 goals after scoring two goals versus Antigua. Jamaica shocked United States 2–1 on to seize the lead in their group in the semi-final round of 2014 FIFA World Cup qualifying in the CONCACAF Zone. Goals from Rodolph Austin and Luton Shelton overcame Clint Dempsey's first-minute strike for the Americans as Jamaica posted their first victory over the US in 19 matches.

== Personal life ==
Shelton had three children with his wife Bobbette.

In 2018, it was announced that Shelton had ALS. He died from complications of the disease on 22 January 2021, aged 35.

== Career statistics ==
=== International ===
Scores and results list Jamaica's goal tally first, score column indicates score after each Shelton goal.

List of international goals scored by Luton Shelton
| No. | Date | Venue | Opponent | Score | Result | Competition |
|---|---|---|---|---|---|---|
| 1 | 24 November 2004 | Independence Park, Kingston, Jamaica | Saint Martin | 4–0 | 12–0 | 2005 Caribbean Cup qualification |
| 2 | 24 November 2004 | Independence Park, Kingston, Jamaica | Saint Martin | 8–0 | 12–0 | 2005 Caribbean Cup qualification |
| 3 | 24 November 2004 | Independence Park, Kingston, Jamaica | Saint Martin | 9–0 | 12–0 | 2005 Caribbean Cup qualification |
| 4 | 24 November 2004 | Independence Park, Kingston, Jamaica | Saint Martin | 10–0 | 12–0 | 2005 Caribbean Cup qualification |
| 5 | 26 November 2004 | Jarrett Park, Montego Bay, Jamaica | U.S. Virgin Islands | 1–0 | 11–0 | 2005 Caribbean Cup qualification |
| 6 | 28 November 2004 | Independence Park, Kingston, Jamaica | Haiti | 3–0 | 3–1 | 2005 Caribbean Cup qualification |
| 7 | 8 January 2005 | Independence Park, Kingston, Jamaica | French Guiana | 3–0 | 5–0 | 2005 Caribbean Cup qualification |
| 8 | 20 February 2005 | Barbados National Stadium, Waterford, Barbados | Trinidad and Tobago | 1–0 | 2–1 | 2005 Caribbean Cup |
| 9 | 24 February 2005 | Barbados National Stadium, Waterford, Barbados | Cuba | 1–0 | 1–0 | 2005 Caribbean Cup |
| 10 | 20 April 2005 | Herndon Stadium, Atlanta, United States | Guatemala | 1–0 | 1–0 | Friendly |
| 11 | 7 July 2005 | The Home Depot Center, Carson, United States | Guatemala | 1–0 | 4–3 | 2005 CONCACAF Gold Cup |
| 12 | 1 October 2005 | Lockhart Stadium, Fort Lauderdale, United States | Guatemala | 1–0 | 2–1 | Friendly |
| 13 | 8 October 2006 | Independence Park, Kingston, Jamaica | Canada | 1–1 | 2–1 | Friendly |
| 14 | 26 March 2007 | Independence Park, Kingston, Jamaica | Panama | 1–1 | 1–1 | Friendly |
| 15 | 7 June 2008 | Marvin Lee Stadium, Macoya, Trinidad and Tobago | Trinidad and Tobago | 1–1 | 1–1 | Friendly |
| 16 | 15 June 2008 | Independence Park, Kingston, Jamaica | Bahamas | 4–0 | 7–0 | 2010 FIFA World Cup qualification |
| 17 | 15 June 2008 | Independence Park, Kingston, Jamaica | Bahamas | 5–0 | 7–0 | 2010 FIFA World Cup qualification |
| 18 | 18 June 2008 | Greenfield Stadium, Trelawny, Jamaica | Bahamas | 2–0 | 6–0 | 2010 FIFA World Cup qualification |
| 19 | 18 June 2008 | Greenfield Stadium, Trelawny, Jamaica | Bahamas | 3–0 | 6–0 | 2010 FIFA World Cup qualification |
| 20 | 18 June 2008 | Greenfield Stadium, Trelawny, Jamaica | Bahamas | 5–0 | 6–0 | 2010 FIFA World Cup qualification |
| 21 | 15 October 2008 | Independence Park, Kingston, Jamaica | Honduras | 1–0 | 1–0 | 2010 FIFA World Cup qualification |
| 22 | 18 October 2008 | Independence Park, Kingston, Jamaica | Canada | 1–0 | 3–0 | 2010 FIFA World Cup qualification |
| 23 | 3 December 2008 | Independence Park, Kingston, Jamaica | Barbados | 2–1 | 2–1 | 2008 Caribbean Championship |
| 24 | 5 December 2008 | Jarrett Park, Montego Bay, Jamaica | Grenada | 2–0 | 4–0 | 2008 Caribbean Championship |
| 25 | 11 December 2008 | Independence Park, Kingston, Jamaica | Guadeloupe | 2–0 | 2–0 | 2008 Caribbean Championship |
| 26 | 14 December 2008 | Independence Park, Kingston, Jamaica | Grenada | 1–0 | 2–0 | 2008 Caribbean Championship |
| 27 | 14 December 2008 | Independence Park, Kingston, Jamaica | Grenada | 2–0 | 2–0 | 2008 Caribbean Championship |
| 28 | 31 January 2010 | Independence Park, Kingston, Jamaica | Canada | 1–0 | 1–0 | Friendly |
| 29 | 27 November 2010 | Stade En Camée, Rivière-Pilote, Martinique | Antigua and Barbuda | 2–0 | 3–1 | 2010 Caribbean Championship |
| 30 | 27 November 2010 | Stade En Camée, Rivière-Pilote, Martinique | Antigua and Barbuda | 3–0 | 3–1 | 2010 Caribbean Championship |
| 31 | 6 June 2011 | The Home Depot Center, Carson, United States | Grenada | 1–0 | 4–0 | 2011 CONCACAF Gold Cup |
| 32 | 15 August 2012 | Robert F. Kennedy Memorial Stadium, Washington, D.C., United States | El Salvador | 1–0 | 2–0 | Friendly |
| 33 | 15 August 2012 | Robert F. Kennedy Memorial Stadium, Washington, D.C., United States | El Salvador | 2–0 | 2–0 | Friendly |
| 34 | 7 September 2012 | Independence Park, Kingston, Jamaica | United States | 2–1 | 2–1 | 2014 FIFA World Cup qualification |
| 35 | 12 October 2012 | Estadio Mateo Flores, Guatemala City, Guatemala | Guatemala | 1–1 | 1–2 | 2014 FIFA World Cup qualification |

== Honours ==
Harbour View

- Caribbean Club Championship: 2004

Helsingborg

- Svenska Cupen: 2006

Vålerenga

- Norwegian Cup: 2008

Aalborg BK

- Danish Cup runner-up: 2008–09

Jamaica

- Caribbean Cup: 2005, 2008, 2010

== See also ==
- List of top international men's football goalscorers by country
