= Dane Richards =

Jamaican footballer (born 1983)

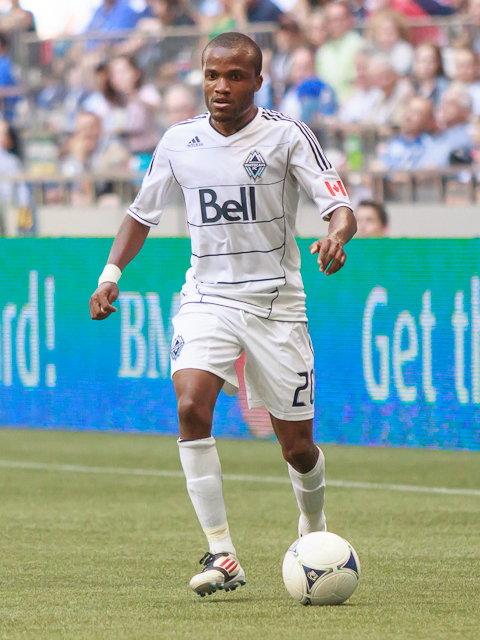
- Richards in 2012

Personal information
- Full name: Dane O'Brian Richards
- Date of birth: 14 December 1983 (age 42)
- Place of birth: Montego Bay, Jamaica
- Height: 5 ft 7 in (1.70 m)
- Position: Winger

Youth career
- 2001–2003: Seba United

College career
Years	Team	Apps	(Gls)
2003–2004	San Jacinto Coyotes		
2005–2006	Clemson Tigers		

Senior career*
Years	Team	Apps	(Gls)
2007–2012	New York Red Bulls	147	(21)
2012	Vancouver Whitecaps FC	12	(3)
2013	Burnley	1	(0)
2013	→ Bodø/Glimt (loan)	14	(2)
2013–2014	Bodø/Glimt	36	(7)
2015	New York Red Bulls	12	(0)
2015	→ Indy Eleven (loan)	15	(3)
2016	Miami FC	9	(0)
Total		246	(36)

International career^{‡}
2002–2014	Jamaica	47	(10)
- * Club domestic league appearances and goals as of 2 June 2016 ‡ National team caps and goals as of 16 October 2014

Dane O'Brian Richards (born 14 December 1983) is a Jamaican former professional footballer, who played as a winger. He spent the majority of his career with Major League Soccer club New York Red Bulls.

== Career ==
=== Youth and college ===
Richards was a member of the youth system of Jamaican National Premier League side Seba United while attending Cornwall College in Montego Bay, where he won the DaCosta Cup and Olivier Shield. He moved to the United States to play college soccer in 2003.

Richards played two years at San Jacinto College in Houston, where he scored a record 45 goals in two years, including a school-record 25 as a sophomore.

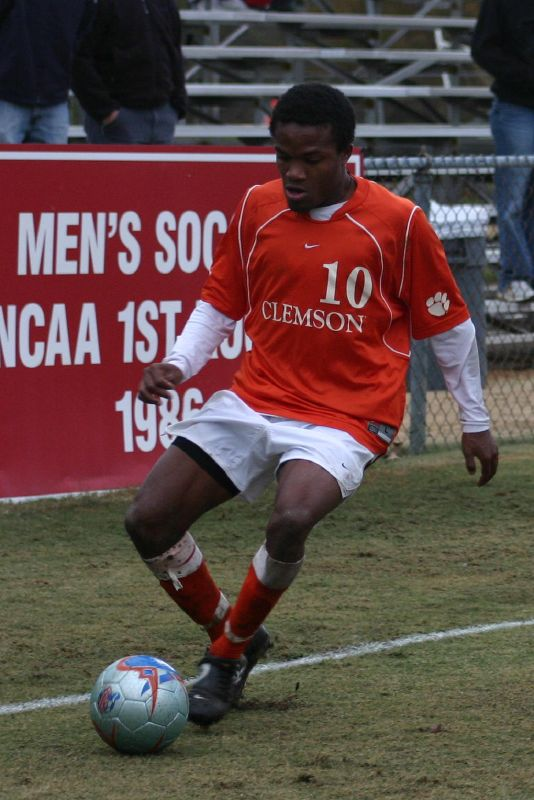
Richards playing for Clemson Tigers

He then moved on to Clemson University, where he led the team in scoring as a junior with 12 goals and nine assists. Richards scored the game-winning goal in three NCAA Tournament matches and scored in Clemson's 2–1 loss to New Mexico in the College Cup semifinals. One summer, he led the youth soccer camp at Clemson University where he coached the likes of Emmett Lunceford, Robert Sullivan, and John Birnie. As a senior in 2006, Richards had 11 goals and nine assists in 19 games, as Clemson lost in the second round of the NCAA Tournament. Richards was named a second-team all-American.

=== Professional ===
==== New York Red Bulls ====
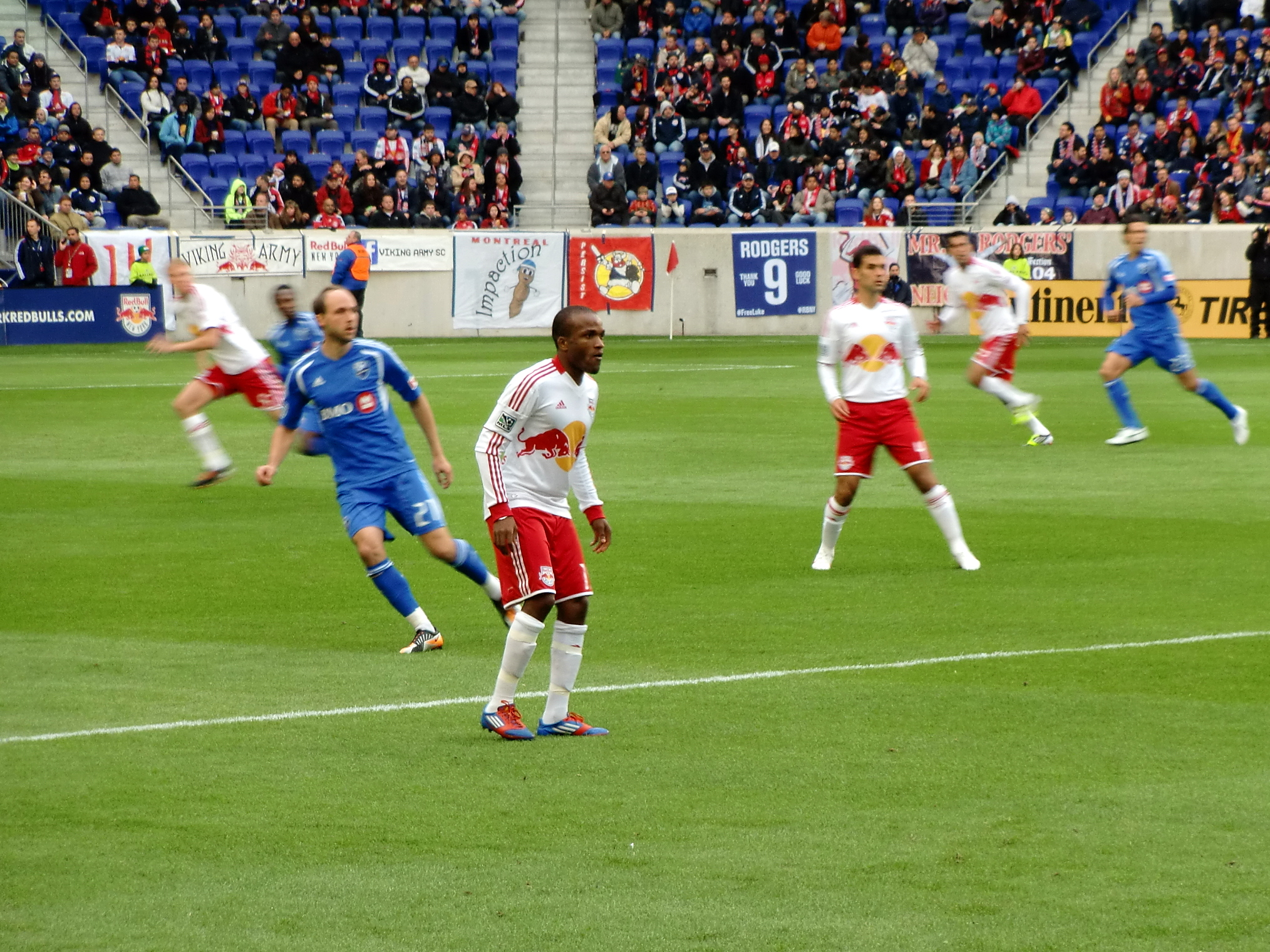
Richards playing for New York Red Bulls in 2012

Richards was drafted in the second round of the 2007 MLS SuperDraft by New York Red Bulls, establishing himself as the first team right winger for the club. On 5 May 2007, Richards scored his first MLS regular season goal in a 3–3 tie at Real Salt Lake. He concluded his first MLS season appearing in 28 matches, including 27 starts, in which he managed two goals and six assists. His assist total was second on the club and led all league rookies. At the conclusion of the season Richards was selected as one of three nominees for league rookie of the year honours.

Richards appeared in 23 MLS regular season matches in 2008, scoring 3 goals and recording 6 assists. In the 2008 MLS Cup Playoffs, Richards helped the Red Bulls to an upset over defending Champion Houston Dynamo (4–1 on aggregate). Richards tallied the club's first goal in a 3–0 rout in the second leg of the series in Robertson Stadium in Houston. He also drew a penalty and assisted on the third goal. In 2009, Richards appeared in 27 league matches scoring 3 goals.

On 20 March 2010, Richards scored the third goal for Red Bulls in a 3–1 victory against Santos FC, which was the first match played at the new Red Bull Arena. On 25 July 2010, Richards scored a goal in helping lead New York to a 2–1 victory against Manchester City in a friendly match. On 24 September 2010, Richards appeared in his 100th league match for New York and helped lead the club to a 2–0 victory in The Home Depot Center over Los Angeles Galaxy scoring his team's first goal and drawing the penalty that led to New York's second goal. Richards concluded his 2010 campaign scoring five goals in his last seven matches helping New York to capture the Eastern Conference regular season title. In 2011, Richards enjoyed his most productive season to date, netting seven goals and providing seven assists in 27 matches.

==== Vancouver Whitecaps FC ====
Richards was traded to Vancouver Whitecaps FC on 13 July 2012 for Sébastien Le Toux and allocation money. At the time of the trade Richards stood second on New York's MLS league career list for games played, games started, and minutes played while placing third in assists. He scored his first goal for Vancouver against the San Jose Earthquakes on 20 July to put the Whitecaps up 1–0.

==== Burnley ====
On 26 August 2012 it was confirmed that Richards would join English Championship side Burnley on 1 January 2013 after the end of the MLS season and in the European transfer window. After initially appearing as a substitute in an FA Cup game, Richards appeared to struggle with his positioning on the field. He was given a second chance, this time in a Championship league game against Huddersfield, coming on after 15 minutes for the injured Dean Marney. Richards again struggled to acclimatise to the pace of the game, and was himself substituted after an hour. This would be his last appearance in a Burnley shirt, and he was sent out on loan shortly after.

Upon his return from his loan spell, Richards was released from his Burnley contract so that he could permanently join Norwegian side FK Bodø/Glimt.

==== Bodø/Glimt ====
After struggling to earn a starting place with Burnley, Richards was sent on loan to Norwegian 1. divisjon club Bodø/Glimt on 4 April 2013. He played in 14 league games and scored 2 goals before his loan period ended, and he returned to his parent club. In July 2013 Richards signed a permanent contract to finish out the season. He helped the club in capturing the 2013 Adeccoligaen and gain promotion to the top flight. On 13 April 2014 Richards helped Bodø/Glimt record their first victory of the Tippeligaen season, scoring the equalizer in a 4-2 come from behind win over Sogndal. He made a total of 55 official appearances for Bodø/Glimt, scoring ten goals.

==== Return to New York Red Bulls ====
On 7 March 2015 it was announced that Richards would be rejoining New York Red Bulls after spending the preseason as a trialist with the club. It was reported on 30 November 2015, that the Red Bulls would not be picking up Richards' option, ending his second stint with the club.

==== Indy Eleven ====
On 10 July 2015, the Red Bulls announced that Richards would be loaned out to NASL side Indy Eleven for the remainder of the season.

==== Miami FC ====
On 10 December 2015, it was announced that Richards had become the first ever signing for new North American Soccer League side Miami FC. He was released by Miami in December 2016.

=== Coaching ===
Richards became an assistant coach of the Austin Texans Soccer Club in March 2017.

=== International ===
Richards debuted with the Jamaica national team in 2002 at the age of 18, and while he was still at Clemson returned to the Jamaica national team, playing in a 1-1 friendly tie against the United States.

His play during the 2007 season did not go unnoticed by the Jamaica Football Federation as he was rewarded by being called up to the national team for friendlies against El Salvador and Guatemala in Kingston. He played in both matches which ended in victory for Jamaica. Richards has also participated in 2010 World Cup qualifying matches and was selected for the 2008 Caribbean Championship. He appeared in all five matches for Jamaica, in helping Jamaica to capture the 2008 Caribbean Championship. Richards also featured in the 2009 CONCACAF Gold Cup. In 2010, Richards became a mainstay with the national team and started to consistently demonstrate outstanding attacking prowess. On 11 August 2010 Richards recorded his first goal for Jamaica in a 3–1 victory against Caribbean rivals Trinidad and Tobago. On 10 October 2010 Richards recorded his second international goal, scoring with a 19th-minute penalty to help Jamaica to a 1–0 victory over Trinidad and Tobago. Richards scored three(3) goals for Jamaica in December 2010, leading them to another Caribbean Cup title, while also winning the Golden Boot.

=== International goals ===
As of 21 July 2013

#	Date	Venue	Opponent	Score	Result	Competitions
1	11 August 2010	Marvin Lee Stadium, Macoya, Trinidad and Tobago	Trinidad and Tobago	1 – 0	3 – 1	International Friendly
2	10 October 2010	Independence Park, Kingston, Jamaica	Trinidad and Tobago	1 – 0	1 – 0	International Friendly
3	29 November 2010	Stade En Camée, Rivière-Pilote, Martinique	Antigua and Barbuda	1 – 0	3 – 1	2010 Caribbean Championship
4	1 December 2010	Stade En Camée, Rivière-Pilote, Martinique	Guyana	1 – 0	4 – 0	2010 Caribbean Championship
5	3 December 2010	Stade Pierre-Aliker, Fort-de-France, Martinique	Grenada	1 – 0	2 – 1	2010 Caribbean Championship
6	29 March 2011	Estadio Cuscatlán, San Salvador, El Salvador	El Salvador	0 – 1	2 – 3	International Friendly
7	29 March 2011	Estadio Cuscatlán, San Salvador, El Salvador	El Salvador	0 – 2	2 – 3	International Friendly
8	1 June 2012	Estadio Rommel Fernández, Panama City, Panama	Panama	1 - 2	1 – 2	International Friendly
9	16 October 2012	Independence Park, Kingston, Jamaica	Antigua and Barbuda	3 – 1	4 – 1	2014 FIFA World Cup qualification
10	16 October 2012	Independence Park, Kingston, Jamaica	Antigua and Barbuda	4 – 1	4 – 1	2014 FIFA World Cup qualification

== Personal ==
Richards holds a U.S. green card which qualifies him as a domestic player for MLS roster purposes.

== Career statistics ==
As of 14 May 2020

Club	Season	League			Cup (Note: Includes the US Open Cup, Canadian Championship, FA Cup, and NM Cupen)		League Cup (Note: Includes the MLS Cup Playoffs, EFL Cup, and NASL Playoffs)		Other (Note: Includes the CONCACAF Champions League)		Total	
Club	Season	Division	Apps	Goals	Apps	Goals	Apps	Goals	Apps	Goals	Apps	Goals
New York Red Bulls	2007	Major League Soccer	28	2	1	0	2	0	—		31	2
New York Red Bulls	2008	Major League Soccer	23	3	0	0	4	1	—		27	4
New York Red Bulls	2009	Major League Soccer	27	3	1	1	—		2	0	30	4
New York Red Bulls	2010	Major League Soccer	25	5	1	0	2	0	—		28	5
New York Red Bulls	2011	Major League Soccer	27	7	0	0	3	0	—		30	7
New York Red Bulls	2012	Major League Soccer	17	1	0	0	0	0	—		17	1
New York Red Bulls	Total		147	21	4	1	11	1	2	0	163	23
Vancouver Whitecaps	2012	Major League Soccer	12	3	0	0	1	0	—		13	3
Burnley	2012–13	EFL Championship	1	0	1	0	0	0	—		2	0
Bodø/Glimt (loan)	2013	Adeccoligaen	14	2	2	1	—		—		16	3
Bodø/Glimt	2013	Adeccoligaen	15	4	0	0	—		—		15	4
Bodø/Glimt	2014	Tippeligaen	22	3	1	0	—		—		23	3
Bodø/Glimt	Total		51	9	3	1	0	0	0	0	54	10
New York Red Bulls	2015	Major League Soccer	12	0	1	0	1	0	—		13	0
Indy Eleven (loan)	2015	North American Soccer League	15	3	0	0	—		—		15	3
Miami FC	2016	North American Soccer League	9	0	1	0	—		—		10	0
Career totals			247	36	10	2	13	1	2	0	272	39

=== International ===
National team	Year	Apps	Goals
Jamaica	2002	2	0
Jamaica	2006	1	0
Jamaica	2007	1	0
Jamaica	2008	7	0
Jamaica	2009	3	0
Jamaica	2010	11	5
Jamaica	2011	9	2
Jamaica	2012	7	3
Jamaica	2013	1	0
Jamaica	2014	5	0
Total		47	10

== Honours ==
New York Red Bulls

- Major League Soccer Western Conference Playoff Championship: 2008
- Major League Soccer Eastern Conference Regular Season Championship: 2010

FK Bodo/Glimt

- Adeccoligaen Norway First Division Winner: 2013 Adeccoligaen

Jamaica

- Caribbean Cup: 2008, 2010, 2014

Individual

- 2010 Caribbean Championship: Golden Boot Winner

== Gallery ==
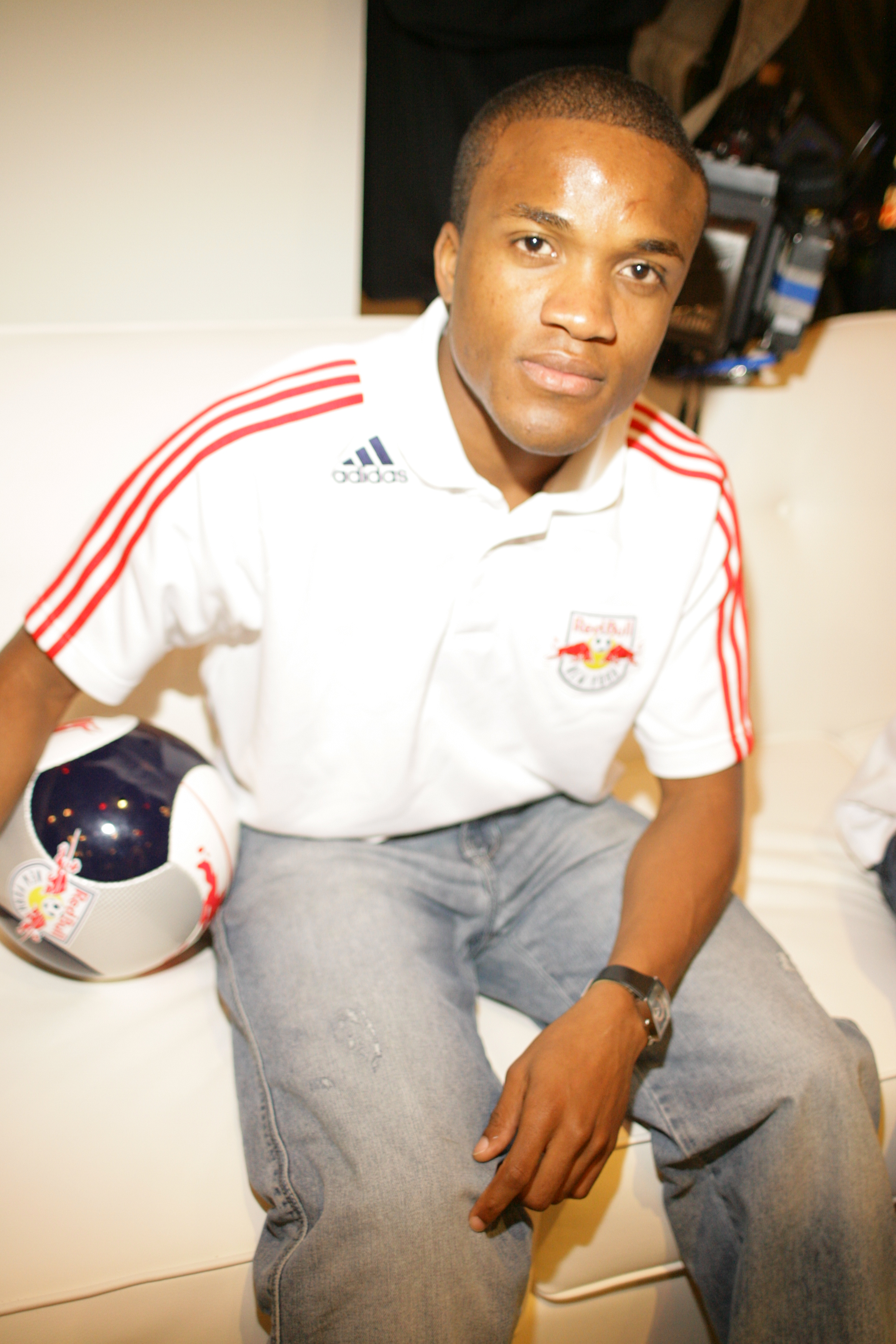

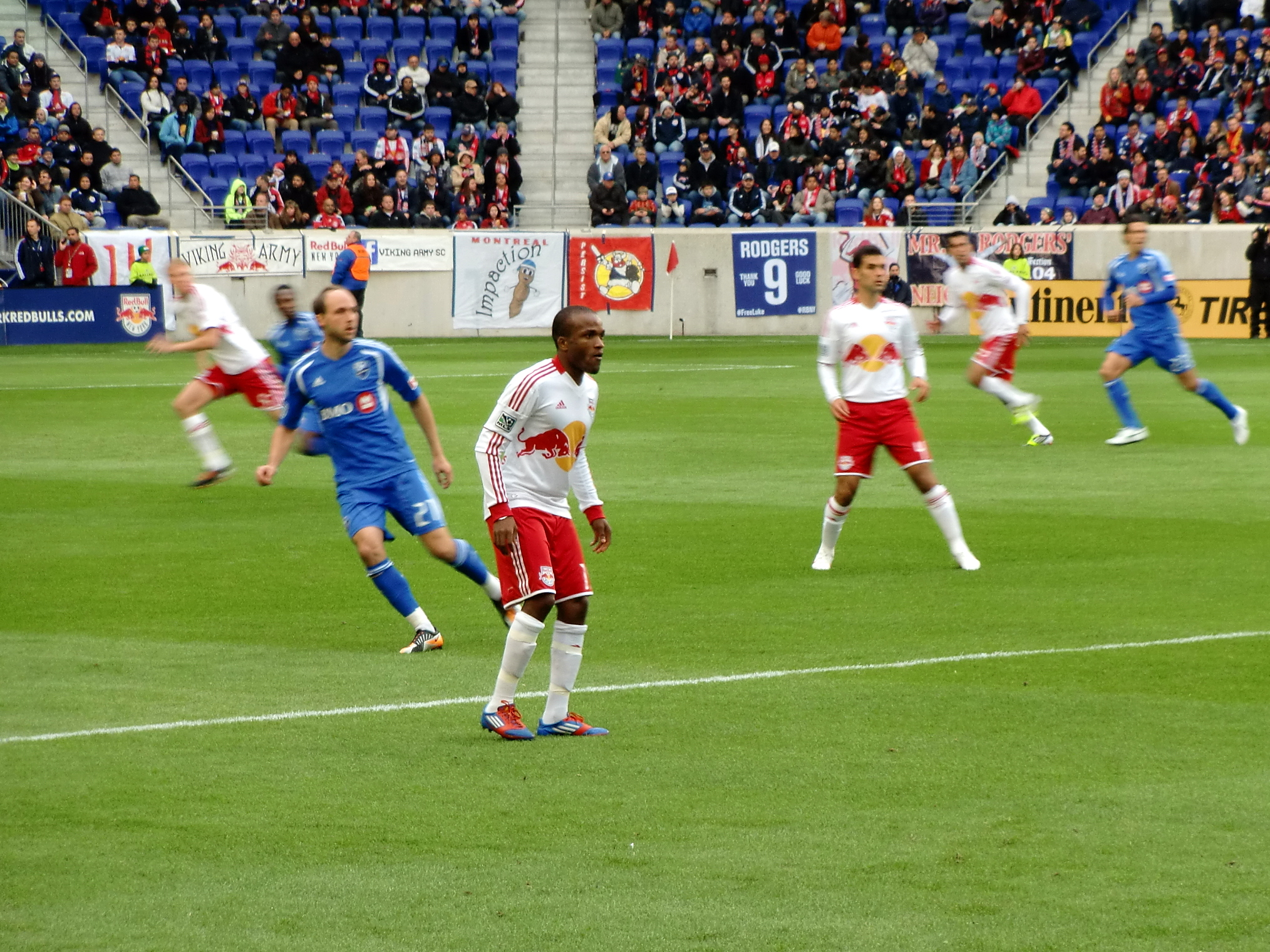

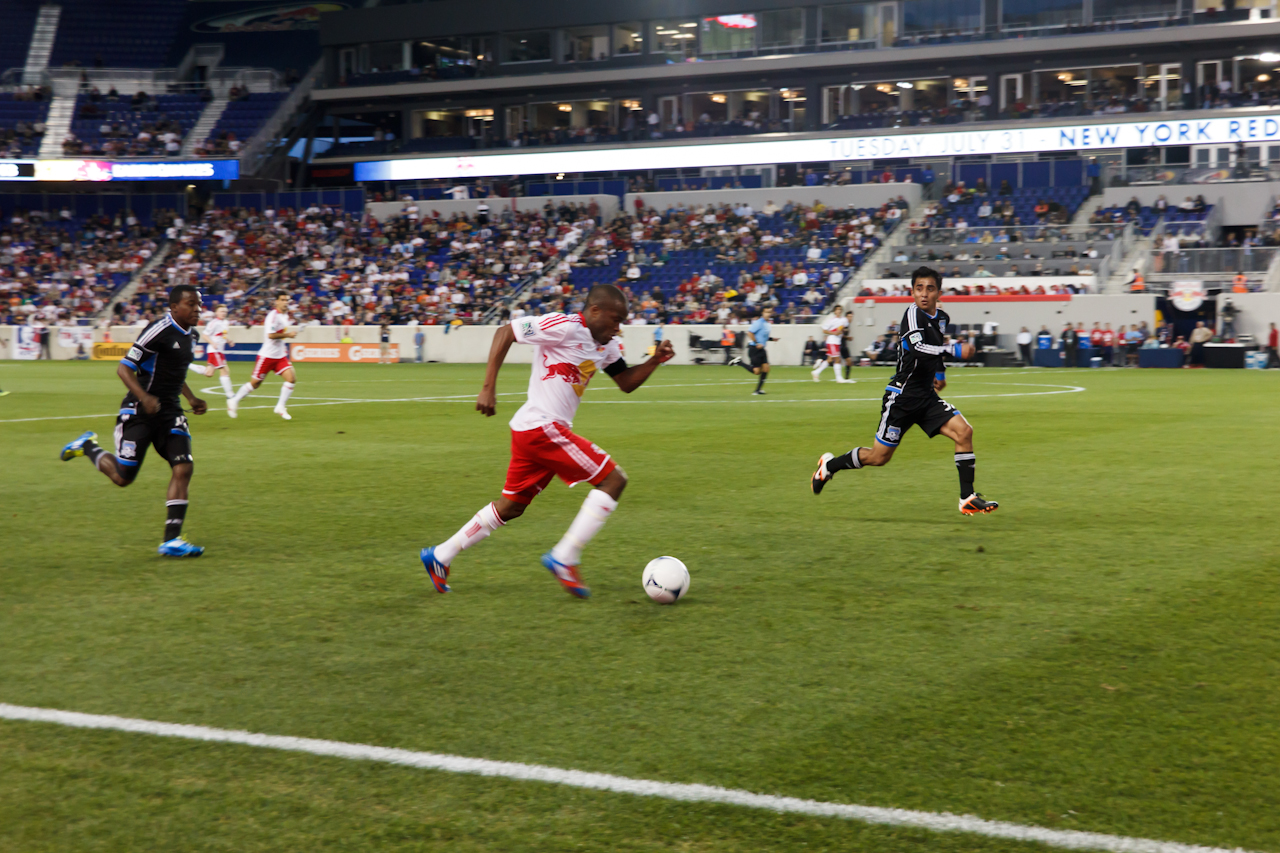
