= Yoel Colomé =

Cuban footballer

Personal information
- Full name: Yoel Colomé Valencia
- Date of birth: 15 October 1982 (age 44)
- Place of birth: Havana, Cuba
- Height: 1.67 m (5 ft 6 in)
- Position: Rightback

Senior career*
Years	Team	Apps	(Gls)
2006–2012	Ciudad de la Habana		
2013–2015	La Habana		
2016–2017	Parham		

International career
2007–2013	Cuba	42	(3)
- * Club domestic league appearances and goals

Yoel Colomé Valencia (born 15 October 1982) is a Cuban football defender.

== Club career ==
Colomé played as a rightback for hometown clubs Ciudad La Habana and La Habana. He played the 2016/17 season at Parham in Antigua and Barbuda alongside compatriots Odelin Molina and Hensy Muñoz and brother Jaime Colomé.

== International career ==
He made his international debut for Cuba in a March 2007 friendly match against Venezuela and has earned a total of 42 caps, scoring three goals. He represented his country in 10 FIFA World Cup qualifying matches

He appeared in three matches with the Cuba national football team for the 2011 CONCACAF Gold Cup.

=== International goals ===
Scores and results list Cuba's goal tally first.

Number	Date	Location	Opponent	Score	Competition
1	11 December 2008	Independence Park, Kingston, Jamaica	Grenada	1-1	2008 Caribbean Cup
2	10 November 2010	Recreation Ground, St. John's, Antigua and Barbuda	Dominica	3-1	2010 Caribbean Cup qualification
3	14 December 2012	Recreation Ground, St. John's, Antigua and Barbuda	Haiti	1-0	2012 Caribbean Cup

== Personal life ==
His brother Jaime also played for the national team.
