= Kithson Bain =

Grenadian footballer (born 1982)

Personal information
- Full name: Kithson Anthony Bain
- Date of birth: 26 May 1982 (age 44)
- Place of birth: Grenada
- Height: 5 ft 10 in (1.78 m)
- Position: Striker

Team information
- Current team: Alpha United

Senior career*
Years	Team	Apps	(Gls)
2000–2002	Queens Park Rangers		
2003–2009	Ball Dogs		
2009–2010	Tranmere Rovers	10	(0)
2009	→ Kettering Town (loan)	2	(0)
2010	Queens Park Rangers		
2010	Alpha United		
2011	All Saints United	6	(5)
2011	Carolina RailHawks	1	(0)
2013	Caledonia AIA		
2014–2019	Alpha United		

International career^{‡}
2002–2015	Grenada	35	(15)
Medal record
Men's football
Representing Grenada
Caribbean Cup
Runner-up	2008 Jamaica
- * Club domestic league appearances and goals as of 19 April 2010 ‡ National team caps and goals as of 10:50, 27 November 2012 (UTC)

Kithson Anthony Bain (born 26 May 1982) is a Grenadian footballer currently playing for Caledonia AIA in the Trinidad and Tobago Premier League. He has been capped at full international level by the Grenada national football team.

== Club career ==
Bain began his footballing career for Grenadian side Queens Park Rangers before moving to fellow Grenadian side Ball Dogs.

=== Tranmere Rovers ===
In 2008 Bain had finished top scorer in the 2008 Caribbean Cup tournament with 5 goals. The then Tranmere Rovers manager John Barnes had also been involved in the tournament and his Jamaica national team won the tournament. Barnes was impressed enough with Bain to bring him to England, he signed for the Birkenhead-based club in August 2009.

Bain made his first appearance for Tranmere in their 3–2 home defeat by Walsall on 12 September 2009.

On 26 November, Bain went out on loan to Conference National side Kettering Town until January 2010.

Despite scoring seven goals for the Tranmere reserves, Bain was only given handful of substitute appearances by Rovers manager Les Parry, ending the season on 10 games, all from the bench. Bain failed to score in his time at Tranmere, although there was dispute over whether he got the last touch on Alan Mahon's goal in Rovers 3–2 win against Walsall. He was released by Tranmere at the end of the 2009/10 season.

He then returned home to Grenada in the summer of 2010 and rejoined his former club Queens Park Rangers. Near the end of 2010 he played in Guyana's Kashif and Shanghai cup competition for Alpha United as a guest player alongside Dominica international Kurlson Benjamin.

=== Carolina RailHawks ===
After impressive performances for Grenada in The Caribbean Cup, Bain caught the eye of reigning American second division NASL Conference champions Carolina RailHawks who signed Bain for the 2011 season. The RailHawks joined the North American Soccer League in 2011. He only played 11 minutes for them in the whole season.

He signed for Trinidadian club Caledonia AIA in September 2013.

== International career ==
Bain has represented Grenada at both Under 23 and full international level. In the 2010 Caribbean Championship he was declared joint winners of the Digicel Golden Boot award.

Scores and results list Grenada's goal tally first.

=== Under-23 international goals ===
#	Date	Venue	Opponent	Score	Result	Competition
1	2003-09-06	Grenada National Stadium, Grenada	Cayman Islands	5–0	5–0	2004 CONCACAF Olympic Qualifiers, Round 1
2	2003-10-12	Grand Cayman, Cayman Islands	Cayman Islands	1–0	5–1	2004 CONCACAF Olympic Qualifiers, Round 1
3	2003-10-12	Grand Cayman, Cayman Islands	Cayman Islands	2–0	5–1	2004 CONCACAF Olympic Qualifiers, Round 1
4	2003-11-16	Grenada National Stadium, Grenada	Trinidad and Tobago	1–0	1–1	2004 CONCACAF Olympic Qualifiers, Round 2

=== Full international goals ===
#	Date	Venue	Opponent	Score	Result	Competition
1	2003-11-04	Kingstown, Saint Vincent and the Grenadines	Saint Vincent and the Grenadines	2–0	2–0	Friendly
2	TBC	TBC	TBC	TBC	TBC	TBC
3	2004-06-02	Tanteen Recreation Ground, Grenada	Saint Lucia	2–0	2–0	Friendly
4	2008-10-15	Stade René Serge Nabajoth, Les Abymes, Guadeloupe	Cayman Islands	1–1	4–2	2008 Caribbean Championships
5	2008-12-03	Independence Park, Kingston, Jamaica	Trinidad and Tobago	1–0	2–1	2008 Caribbean Championships
6	2008-12-07	Greenfield Stadium, Trelawny, Jamaica	Barbados	1–0	4–2	2008 Caribbean Championships
7	2008-12-07	Greenfield Stadium, Trelawny, Jamaica	Barbados	3–0	4–2	2008 Caribbean Championships
8	2008-12-07	Greenfield Stadium, Trelawny, Jamaica	Barbados	4–0	4–2	2008 Caribbean Championships
9	2008-12-11	Independence Park, Kingston, Jamaica	Cuba	2–2	2–2	2008 Caribbean Championships
10	2010-05-30	Progress Park, St. Andrew's, Grenada	Martinique	1–1	2–2	Friendly
11	2010-10-22	Grenada National Stadium, St. George's, Grenada	Puerto Rico	1–0	3–1	2010 Caribbean Championship
12	2010-10-22	Grenada National Stadium, St. George's, Grenada	Puerto Rico	2–0	3–1	2010 Caribbean Championship
13	2010-11-26	Stade Pierre-Aliker, Fort-de-France, Martinique	Martinique	1–0	1–1	2010 Caribbean Championship
14	2010-11-28	Stade Pierre-Aliker, Fort-de-France, Martinique	Trinidad and Tobago	1–0	1–0	2010 Caribbean Championship
15	2010-12-03	Stade Pierre-Aliker, Fort-de-France, Martinique	Jamaica	1–1	1–2	2010 Caribbean Championship

== Honours ==
Grenada

- Caribbean Cup: runner-up 2008
