= Steve Mark =

Grenadian footballer

Personal information
- Date of birth: 15 March 1966
- Date of death: 20 June 2016 (aged 50)
- Place of death: Fulham, London, England
- Position: Defender

International career
Years	Team	Apps	(Gls)
1989–1998	Grenada		

Steve Mark (15 March 1966 – 20 June 2016) was a Grenadian international footballer who played as a defender.

In 1989, he was awarded the 'MVP' award for his performances during the 1989 regional Caribbean competition. He also participated in FIFA World Cup qualifiers for Grenada in 1998, making two appearances. On 20 June 2016, Mark stabbed his wife to death and then committed suicide at their home in Fulham.
