= Caribbean Cup =

International football tournament

- Organiser(s): CFU
- Founded: 1989; 37 years ago
- Abolished: 2017; 9 years ago
- Region: Caribbean
- Teams: 31
- Related competitions: CFU Championship; Copa Centroamericana/Copa de Naciones UNCAF; North American Nations Cup
- Last champions: Curaçao (1st title)
- Most championships: Trinidad and Tobago (8 titles)
- Website: www.caribbeancup.org

The Caribbean Cup was an association football competition organized by CFU as its top regional tournament for men's senior national teams from the Caribbean. The tournament was held from 1989 to 2017, as the direct successor competition of the CFU Championship and also served as a qualification method for the CONCACAF Gold Cup.

Trinidad and Tobago, eight-time champions, and Jamaica, six-time champions, were the most successful teams, winning a combined 14 titles of 18 editions. Martinique, Haiti, Cuba and Curaçao also won the tournament.

In 1990 on the day of the final, an insurrection in Trinidad and Tobago, the host nation, by the Jamaat al Muslimeen forced an abandonment of the tournament with only the final and 3rd place play-off game remaining. Also, the tournament was not held in 2000, 2002 and 2003.

The 2017 edition of the tournament was the 19th and final. The tournament was discontinued in favour of participation in the CONCACAF Nations League.

== Sponsors ==
Over the years, the tournament has been named after its respective sponsors. Shell had sponsored the competition since its inception in 1989.

By February 1996, Jack Warner had announced a new sponsorship from sports apparel company Umbro for the 1996 Caribbean Cup. The tournament was also co-sponsored by Umbro in 1997 before Shell re-attained sole-sponsorship for the 1998 event.

In October 1998, during the first and only year of sponsorship from the Asia Sport Group (now World Sport Group), the competition changed its name to Copa Caribe. CFU's chairman Jack Warner stated that the change was made to highlight the competition being a branch of the Copa de Oro. Florida-based Inter/Forever (now Traffic Group) agreed a sponsorship deal to replace the Asia Sport Group agreement in January 1999. The competition retained the title Copa Caribe for the 1999 and 2001 editions.

There was no competition held in 2003, instead teams focused on a group-stage only qualifying tournament.

Caribbean-based mobile phone company Digicel took over the sponsorship in 2004, in June 2007 they agreed to sponsor the 2008 and 2010 events. The 2012 and 2014 editions of the competition had no title sponsor, while the last tournament (in 2017) was sponsored by Scotiabank.

== Results ==
| Year | Hosts | Final | | | Third place game | | |
| Year | Hosts | Champions | Results | Runners-up | Third place | Results | Fourth place |
|---|---|---|---|---|---|---|---|
| 1989 | Barbados | Trinidad and Tobago | 2–1 | Grenada | Guadeloupe | – (Note: No third place playoff was played. Third place was awarded based on table standings.) | Netherlands Antilles |
| 1990 | Trinidad and Tobago | The tournament was unfinished, the final and third place matches were not played (Note: Play was suspended when Jamaat al Muslimeen attempted a coup d'état of the government of Trinidad and Tobago. The tournament was abandoned altogether after Tropical storm Arthur forced the cancellation of the final round of games. Trinidad and Tobago were to meet Martinique in the final, and Jamaica and Barbados were to meet in the third place match.) | | | | | |
| 1991 | Jamaica | Jamaica | 2–0 | Trinidad and Tobago | Saint Lucia | 4–1 | Guyana |
| 1992 | Trinidad and Tobago | Trinidad and Tobago | 3–1 | Jamaica | Martinique | 1–1 (5–3 p) | Cuba |
| 1993 | Jamaica | Martinique | 0–0 (6–5 p) | Jamaica | Trinidad and Tobago | 3–2 | Saint Kitts and Nevis |
| 1994 | Trinidad and Tobago | Trinidad and Tobago | 7–2 | Martinique | Guadeloupe | 2–0 | Suriname |
| 1995 | Cayman Islands; Jamaica | Trinidad and Tobago | 5–0 | Saint Vincent and the Grenadines | Cuba | 3–0 | Cayman Islands |
| 1996 | Trinidad and Tobago | Trinidad and Tobago | 2–0 | Cuba | Martinique | 1–1 (3–2 p) | Suriname |
| 1997 | Antigua and Barbuda; Saint Kitts and Nevis | Trinidad and Tobago | 4–0 | Saint Kitts and Nevis | Jamaica | 4–1 | Grenada |
| 1998 | Jamaica; Trinidad and Tobago | Jamaica | 2–1 | Trinidad and Tobago | Haiti | 3–2 | Antigua and Barbuda |
| 1999 | Trinidad and Tobago | Trinidad and Tobago | 2–1 | Cuba | Haiti and Jamaica (Note: The third place match was cancelled due to condition of field after the final was already played.) | | |
| 2001 | Trinidad and Tobago | Trinidad and Tobago | 3–0 | Haiti | Martinique | 1–0 | Cuba |
| 2005 | Barbados | Jamaica | Round-Robin | Cuba | Trinidad and Tobago | Round-Robin | Barbados |
| 2007 | Trinidad and Tobago | Haiti | 2–1 | Trinidad and Tobago | Cuba | 2–1 | Guadeloupe |
| 2008 | Jamaica | Jamaica | 2–0 | Grenada | Guadeloupe | 0–0 (5–4 p) | Cuba |
| 2010 | Martinique | Jamaica | 1–1 (5–4 p) | Guadeloupe | Cuba | 1–0 | Grenada |
| 2012 | Antigua and Barbuda | Cuba | 1–0 | Trinidad and Tobago | Haiti | 1–0 | Martinique |
| 2014 | Jamaica | Jamaica | 0–0 (4–3 p) | Trinidad and Tobago | Haiti | 2–1 | Cuba |
| 2017 | Martinique | Curaçao | 2–1 | Jamaica | French Guiana | 1–0 | Martinique |

== Participating teams ==
The 31 members of CFU participated on the tournament and qualification:

- Anguilla
- Antigua and Barbuda
- Aruba
- Bahamas
- Barbados
- Bermuda
- Bonaire
- British Virgin Islands
- Cayman Islands
- Cuba
- Curaçao
- Dominica
- Dominican Republic
- French Guiana
- Grenada
- Guadeloupe
- Guyana
- Haiti
- Jamaica
- Martinique
- Montserrat
- Puerto Rico
- Saint Kitts and Nevis
- Saint Lucia
- Saint Martin
- Saint Vincent and the Grenadines
- Sint Maarten
- Suriname
- Trinidad and Tobago
- Turks and Caicos Islands
- U.S. Virgin Islands

== Performances ==
| Team | Champions | Runners-up | Third place | Fourth place | Total |
|---|---|---|---|---|---|
| Trinidad and Tobago | 8 (1989, 1992, 1994, 1995, 1996, 1997, 1999, 2001) | 5 (1991, 1998, 2007, 2012, 2014) | 2 (1993, 2005) | – | 15 |
| Jamaica | 6 (1991, 1998, 2005, 2008, 2010, 2014) | 3 (1992, 1993, 2017) | 2 (1997, 1999) | – | 11 |
| Cuba | 1 (2012) | 3 (1996, 1999, 2005) | 3 (1995, 2007, 2010) | 4 (1992, 2001, 2008, 2014) | 11 |
| Haiti | 1 (2007) | 1 (2001) | 4 (1998, 1999, 2012, 2014) | – | 6 |
| Martinique | 1 (1993) | 1 (1994) | 3 (1992, 1996, 2001) | 2 (2012, 2017) | 7 |
| Curaçao/Netherlands Antilles | 1 (2017) | – | – | 1 (1989) | 2 |
| Grenada | – | 2 (1989, 2008) | – | 2 (1997, 2010) | 4 |
| Guadeloupe | – | 1 (2010) | 3 (1989), (1994), (2008) | 1 (2007) | 5 |
| Saint Kitts and Nevis | – | 1 (1997) | – | 1 (1993) | 2 |
| Saint Vincent and the Grenadines | – | 1 (1995) | – | – | 1 |
| Saint Lucia | – | – | 1 (1991) | – | 1 |
| French Guiana | – | – | 1 (2017) | – | 1 |
| Suriname | – | – | – | 2 (1994, 1996) | 2 |
| Guyana | – | – | – | 1 (1991) | 1 |
| Cayman Islands | – | – | – | 1 (1995) | 1 |
| Antigua and Barbuda | – | – | – | 1 (1998) | 1 |
| Barbados | – | – | – | 1 (2005) | 1 |

Notes

Italic — Hosts

== Awards ==
| Year | Most Valuable player | Top Goalscorer^{(Finals only)} | Best goalkeeper | Fair play award |
|---|---|---|---|---|
| 1989 | (Grenada) Steve Mark | (Trinidad and Tobago) Dwight Yorke, (Trinidad and Tobago) Philbert Jones (2 goals) | | Grenada |
| 1991 | (Jamaica) Paul Davis | (Jamaica) Paul Davis (5 goals) | | |
| 1992 | | (Trinidad and Tobago) Leonson Lewis (7 goals) | | |
| 1993 | (Jamaica) Walter Boyd | (Martinique) Jean-Michel Modestin (5 goals) | | Saint Kitts and Nevis |
| 1994 | (Trinidad and Tobago) David Nakhid | | | |
| 1995 | (Trinidad and Tobago) David Nakhid | | | |
| 1996 | | (Trinidad and Tobago) Russell Latapy (6 goals) | | |
| 1997 | (Trinidad and Tobago) Jerren Nixon | | (Trinidad and Tobago) Clayton Ince | |
| 1998 | (Trinidad and Tobago) Stern John | (Trinidad and Tobago) Stern John (10 goals) | (Trinidad and Tobago) Clayton Ince | |
| 1999 | (Cuba) Raciel Martínez | (Cuba) Ariel Álvarez (5 goals) | (Trinidad and Tobago) Clayton Ince | |
| 2001 | (Trinidad and Tobago) Dennis Lawrence | (Haiti) Golman Pierre (5 goals) | (Trinidad and Tobago) Clayton Ince | |
| 2005 | (Jamaica) Andy Williams | (Jamaica) Luton Shelton (9 goals) | | |
| 2007 | (Haiti) Pierre Richard Bruny | (Trinidad and Tobago) Gary Glasgow (6 goals) | | |
| 2008 | (Jamaica) Eric Vernan | (Grenada) Kithson Bain, (Jamaica) Luton Shelton (5 goals) | | |
| 2010 | (Jamaica) Rodolph Austin | (Jamaica) Dane Richards, (Grenada) Kithson Bain (3 goals) | | |
| 2012 | | eight players (2 goals) | | |
| 2014 | (Jamaica) Rodolph Austin | (Haiti) Kervens Belfort, (Jamaica) Darren Mattocks and (Trinidad and Tobago) Kevin Molino (3 goals) | (Jamaica) Andre Blake | Haiti |
| 2017 | (Curaçao) Gino van Kessel | (Curaçao) Elson Hooi (2 goals) | (Curaçao) Eloy Room | |

== See also ==
- CFU
- UNCAF
- NAFU
- CFU Championship
- Copa Centroamericana/Copa de Naciones UNCAF
- North American Nations Cup
