= Marvin Morgan Jr. =

Jamaican footballer (born 1992)

Personal information
- Date of birth: 16 August 1992 (age 34)
- Place of birth: Kingston, Jamaica
- Height: 1.69 m (5 ft 6 1/2 in)
- Position: Midfielder

Youth career
- Boys' Town
- St George's College

Senior career*
Years	Team	Apps	(Gls)
2007–2009	Santos FC	47	(12)
2010–2011	→ Boys' Town (loan)	38	(4)
2011	→ Ventura County Fusion (loan)	10	(0)
2012–2013	Boys' Town	28	(3)
2013–2014	Waterhouse	25	(3)
2014–2019	Arnett Gardens	97	(12)
2015	Lansdowne Bhoys		
2019–2024	Scarborough SC		

International career^{‡}
2008	Jamaica u17	5	(2)
2010–2011	Jamaica u20	2	(0)
2010–2018	Jamaica	8	(4)
- * Club domestic league appearances and goals as of 8 September 2019 ‡ National team caps and goals as of 20 August 2018

Marvin Morgan Jr. (born 16 August 1992) is a Jamaican football midfielder.

== Club career ==
=== Early career ===
Morgan Jr. played for Santos FC in Jamaica while still a schoolboy, scoring 8 goals in the 2008–09 season.

Having experienced success at the schoolboy level with St George's College. Marvin Morgan Jr. signed with Boys' Town F.C. in February 2010.

Morgan Jr. enjoyed success in his first season in the DPL leading his team to a top 6 finish and capturing the 2010 Champions Cup. For the 2010–11 season, Morgan Jr. has been influential in the central midfield for Boys' Town, although he missed several weeks away on trials with various clubs in Denmark and with Birmingham City in England. He would fail to get a contract with Birmingham, after failing to qualify for a work permit.

Morgan returned to Boys' Town in January 2012 for the remainder of the Red Stripe Premiere League season. He led his team to another second-place finish in the Red Stripe Premiere League and qualification for the 2013 CFU Club Championship.

=== United States ===
Morgan was fielded by Boys' Town in their first two matches of the 2011–12 season but was deemed ineligible since he was not given clearance by the USSF after playing in the United States-based USL Premier Development League for Ventura County Fusion on a loan deal.

=== Jamaica ===
In 2013, Morgan Jr. moved to league rivals Waterhouse F.C. His tenure with Waterhouse lasted only a single season as he was transferred to Arnett Gardens for the 2014–15 season. In his debut season with Arnett, he assisted the club in securing the regular season title and the playoff championship.

After the conclusion of the season, he returned to the United States to play in the New York-centered Cosmopolitan Soccer League with Lansdowne Bhoys FC. Morgan returned to his former club Arnett Gardens in the early winter of 2016. He re-signed with the club for the 2016–17 season. Arnett Gardens would secure a postseason berth and reach the playoff championship final. Morgan would appear in the championship final, where he contributed a goal against Portmore United that helped secure the title for the club. He participated in the 2018 Caribbean Club Championship and recorded a goal against Central which advanced the club to tournament finals. In the finals, the club was defeated by Atlético Pantoja in a penalty shootout but still qualified for the 2018 CONCACAF League.

Morgan would play in both matches and contributed a goal against Árabe Unido where Arnett was eliminated from the continental competition. Arnett would re-sign Morgan for the 2018–19 season, where he would serve as the team captain. Following the conclusion of the season, he departed from the organization.

=== Canada ===
In 2019, Morgan played in the Canadian Soccer League with Scarborough SC. In his debut season, he assisted the club in securing a postseason berth by finishing second in the league's first division. Morgan would participate in the CSL Championship final where Scarborough would defeat FC Ukraine United for the title.

He would re-sign with the eastern Toronto side for the 2020 season and helped the club clinch the divisional title. For the second consecutive season, he played in the championship final against Vorkuta where Scarborough was defeated by a score of 2–1. Morgan returned for the 2021 season. Throughout the 2021 campaign, he appeared in the invitational tournament final the ProSound Cup against rivals Vorkuta where Scarborough was defeated in a penalty shootout. He won his second championship title by assisting Scarborough in defeating Vorkuta in the 2021 playoffs.

He returned for his fourth season with Scarborough in 2023. Throughout the season, he helped the club in securing the regular season title.

== International career ==
In 2008, Morgan featured in the 2008 CFU U16 championship for Jamaica. Morgan was also selected to represent the Jamaica national under-20 football team in the 2011 CONCACAF U-20 Championship.

He would ultimately make his senior international debut against Trinidad and Tobago on 10 October 2010 in a friendly match. Morgan Jr. was also named to the 2010 Digicel Caribbean Championship squad for Jamaica. He scored two goals against Guyana on 1 December 2010 in the final match of the group stage. Jamaica would ultimately win the tournament by defeating Guadeloupe in a penalty shootout.

Morgan returned to the senior national team in 2017, where he was selected to represent the country against Trinidad and Tobago in a friendly match. The following year, he made further appearances for the national team initially in a two-game series against Antigua and Barbuda. He would contribute a goal in a friendly match against Barbados on 21 August 2018.

== Personal life ==
Marvin Mr. Man Morgan Jr. comes from a footballing family as his grandfather, Lloyd "Respic" Morgan, father, Marvin Morgan Sr., and twin sister, Marvel Morgan also play the sport. Morgan Jr. was introduced to the sport by his father Marvin Morgan Sr., who played alongside his son in 2010 at Boys' Town F.C.

== Career statistics ==
Scores and results list Jamaica's goal tally first.

No	Date	Venue	Opponent	Score	Result	Competition
1.	1 December 2010	Stade Alfred Marie-Jeanne, Rivière-Pilote, Martinique	Guyana	2–0	4–0	2010 Caribbean Cup
2.	1 December 2010	Stade Alfred Marie-Jeanne, Rivière-Pilote, Martinique	Guyana	3–0	4–0	2010 Caribbean Cup
3.	7 October 2017	King Abdullah Sports City, Jeddah, Saudi Arabia	Saudi Arabia	2–4	2–5	Friendly
4.	20 August 2018	Wildey Astro Turf, Bridgetown, Barbados	Barbados	1–2	2–2	Friendly

== Honours ==
Arnett Gardens

- Jamaica Premier League: 2014–15,2016–17

Boys' Town F.C.

- JFF Champions Cup: 2009–10

Scarborough SC

- CSL Championship: 2019, 2021
- Canadian Soccer League First Division: 2020, 2023
