= 2008 Caribbean Cup =

Digicel Caribbean Cup 2008

Tournament details
- Host country: Jamaica
- Dates: 22 July–9 November (qualifying); 3–17 December (finals)
- Teams: 21 (from 1 confederation)
- Venues: 3 (in 3 host cities)

Final positions
- Champions: Jamaica (4th title)
- Runners-up: Grenada
- Third place: Guadeloupe
- Fourth place: Cuba

Tournament statistics
- Matches played: 16
- Goals scored: 181 (11.31 per match)
- Top scorer(s): (Grenada) Kitson Bain (Jamaica) Luton Shelton (5 goals each)
- Best player: (Jamaica) Eric Vernan

The 2008 Caribbean Cup (known as the Digicel Caribbean Cup for sponsorship reasons) is the 2008 edition of the Caribbean Championship, an international football championship for national teams affiliated with the Caribbean Football Union (CFU) of the CONCACAF region. The finals were held in Jamaica from 3–14 December 2008. The four semifinalists – Jamaica, Grenada, Guadeloupe, and Cuba – all qualified for the 2009 edition of the CONCACAF Gold Cup, although Cuba later withdrew and was replaced by Haiti.

Qualifying began in July 2008. The qualifying rounds were used to qualify a total of six teams to the final round of the tournament to join the hosts, Jamaica, and the reigning champions, Haiti, who were given direct entry to the final group stage. The name was changed this year from Digicel Caribbean Cup to Digicel Caribbean Championship.

== Group stage ==
Played in Jamaica from 3–14 December.

Haiti and Jamaica automatically qualified for this round.

=== Group I ===
Team	Pld	W	D	L	GF	GA	GD	Pts
Cuba	3	2	0	1	5	2	+3	6
Guadeloupe	3	1	1	1	6	6	0	4
Haiti	3	1	1	1	4	4	0	4
Antigua and Barbuda	3	0	2	1	3	6	−3	2

4 December 2008

Haiti	1–1	Antigua and Barbuda
Nordé 53'	http://www.concacaf.com/competitions/matchreport/7530.pdf	Byers 72'

Jarrett Park, Montego Bay
Referee: Mark Forde (Barbados)
4 December 2008

Guadeloupe	1–2	Cuba
Hannany 27'	Report	Fernandez 8'; Linares 74'

Jarrett Park, Montego Bay
Referee: Neal Brizan (Trinidad and Tobago)

6 December 2008

Cuba	3–0	Antigua and Barbuda
Marquez 7'; Linares 20'; Colomé 35' (pen.)	Report

Greenfield Stadium, Trelawny
Referee: Courtney Campbell (Jamaica)
6 December 2008

Haiti	2–3	Guadeloupe
Boucicaut 45' (pen.); Ednerson 68'		Antoine-Curier 14'; Niçoise 17'; Lambourde 90'

Greenfield Stadium, Trelawny
Referee: Trevor Taylor (Barbados)

8 December 2008

Cuba	0–1	Haiti
		Boucicaut 35'

Jarrett Park, Montego Bay
Referee: Neal Brizan (Trinidad and Tobago)
8 December 2008

Antigua and Barbuda	2–2	Guadeloupe
Byers 35', 82'	Report	Antoine-Curier 1'; Gendrey 63'

Jarrett Park, Montego Bay
Referee: Courtney Campbell (Jamaica)

=== Group J ===
Team	Pld	W	D	L	GF	GA	GD	Pts
Jamaica	3	2	1	0	7	2	+5	7
Grenada	3	2	0	1	6	7	−1	6
Trinidad and Tobago	3	1	1	1	4	4	0	4
Barbados	3	0	0	3	4	8	−4	0

3 December 2008

Trinidad and Tobago	1–2	Grenada
Leo 70'	Report	Bain 36'; Charles 90+'

Independence Park, Kingston
Referee: Otis James (Guyana)
3 December 2008

Jamaica	2–1	Barbados
Austin 76'; Shelton 82' (pen.)	Report	Williams 45+'

Independence Park, Kingston
Referee: Joel Aguilar (El Salvador)

5 December 2008

Barbados	1–2	Trinidad and Tobago
Goodridge 13'	Report	McFarlane 42' (pen.), 73' (pen.)

Jarrett Park, Montego Bay
Referee: Javier Jauregui (Netherlands Antilles)
5 December 2008

Jamaica	4–0	Grenada
Vernan 7'; Shelton 18'; Williams 53'; Phillips 78'	Report

Jarrett Park, Montego Bay
Referee: Roberto Moreno (Panama)

7 December 2008

Grenada	4–2	Barbados
Bain 14', 28', 67'; Julien 22'	Report	Williams 71', 78'

Greenfield Stadium, Trelawny
Referee: Joel Aguilar (El Salvador)
7 December 2008

Jamaica	1–1	Trinidad and Tobago
Vernan 46'	Report	McFarlane 81'

Greenfield Stadium, Trelawny
Referee: Roberto Moreno (Panama)

== Knockout phase ==
=== Semi-finals ===
11 December 2008
17:00 (UTC-5)

Cuba	2–2 (a.e.t.)	Grenada
Yoel Colomé 14'; Linares 33'	Report	Charles 12' (pen.); Bain 80'
Penalties
Cervantes (penalty scored); Martínez (penalty scored); Colomé (penalty missed); Minoso (penalty scored); Márquez (penalty scored); Urguelles (penalty scored); Fernández (penalty missed)	5–6	(penalty scored) Modeste; (penalty scored) Rennie; (penalty missed) Bain; (penalty scored) Marshall; (penalty scored) Charles; (penalty scored) Langaigne; (penalty scored) Williams

Independence Park, Kingston
Referee: Roberto Moreno (Panama)

11 December 2008
19:00 (UTC-5)

Jamaica	2–0	Guadeloupe
Thompson 11'; Shelton 57'	Report

Independence Park, Kingston
Referee: Joel Aguilar (El Salvador)

=== Third Place Playoff ===
14 December 2008
15:30 (UTC-5)

Cuba	0–0	Guadeloupe
	Match Facts
Penalties
Cervantes (penalty scored); Martínez (penalty scored); Márquez (penalty scored); Minoso (penalty scored); Colomé (penalty missed)	4–5	(penalty scored) Nabab; (penalty scored) Hannany; (penalty scored) Vertot; (penalty scored) Antoine-Curier; (penalty scored) Lambourde

Independence Park, Kingston
Referee: Trevor Taylor (Barbados)

=== Final ===
14 December 2008
18:00 (UTC-5)

Jamaica	2–0	Grenada
Shelton 17' (pen.), 71' (pen.)	Report

Independence Park, Kingston
Referee: Neal Brizan (Trinidad and Tobago)

2008 Caribbean Cup
winner

Jamaica
Fourth title

== Goalscorers ==
Goals only from the final tournament

5 goals

- (Grenada) Kitson Bain
- (Jamaica) Luton Shelton

3 goals

- (Barbados) Riviere Williams
- (Cuba) Roberto Linares
- (Antigua and Barbuda) Peter Byers
- (Trinidad and Tobago) Errol McFarlane

2 goals

- (Cuba) Yenier Márquez
- (Grenada) Ricky Charles
- (Guadeloupe) Mickaël Antoine-Curier
- (Haiti) Alexandre Boucicaut
- (Jamaica) Eric Vernan
- (Trinidad and Tobago) Devon Jorsling

1 goal

- (Barbados) Gregory Goodridge
- (Cuba) Jaime Colomé
- (Cuba) Yoel Colomé
- (Cuba) Reysander Fernández
- (Grenada) Marcus Julien
- (Guadeloupe) Gregory Gendrey
- (Guadeloupe) Lery Hannany
- (Guadeloupe) Jean-Luc Lambourde
- (Guadeloupe) Michaël Niçoise
- (Haiti) Raymond Ednerson
- (Haiti) Sony Norde
- (Jamaica) Rudolph Austin
- (Jamaica) Demar Phillips
- (Jamaica) Oneil Thompson
- (Jamaica) Andy Williams
- (Trinidad and Tobago) Dwayne Leo
