= Troy Smith (footballer) =

Jamaican footballer (born 1987)

Personal information
- Date of birth: 11 April 1987 (age 39)
- Place of birth: Falmouth, Jamaica
- Height: 1.78 m (5 ft 10 in)
- Position: Midfielder

Senior career*
Years	Team	Apps	(Gls)
2005–2011	Village United		
2012–2015	Montego Bay United	14	(1)

International career
2010–2012	Jamaica	10	(1)
- * Club domestic league appearances and goals

Troy Smith (born 11 April 1987) is a Jamaican former international footballer who played as a midfielder.

== Career ==
Born in Falmouth, Smith began his career with Village United, before moving to Montego Bay United in 2012.

He made his international debut for Jamaica in 2010.

His playing career ended due to injury, and he later became a coach.
