= Eric Vernan =

Jamaican footballer (born 1987)

Personal information
- Date of birth: 4 July 1987 (age 39)
- Place of birth: Clarendon Parish, Jamaica
- Height: 1.70 m (5 ft 7 in)
- Position: Right winger

Team information
- Current team: Harbour View

Senior career*
Years	Team	Apps	(Gls)
2006–2009	Portmore United		
2009–2010	Nybergsund IL	18	(2)
2010–2012	Portmore United		
2012–	Harbour View		

International career^{‡}
2008–	Jamaica	29	(3)
- * Club domestic league appearances and goals as of 19:51, 10 January 2014 (UTC) ‡ National team caps and goals as of 19:51, 10 January 2014 (UTC)

Eric Vernan (born 4 July 1987) is a Jamaican international footballer who plays for Harbour View, as a right winger.

== Career ==
Vernan has played club football in Jamaica and Norway for Portmore United, Nybergsund IL and Harbour View.

He made his international debut for Jamaica on 26 July 2008, in a friendly match against El Salvador.
