= Trelawny Stadium =

Cricket stadium

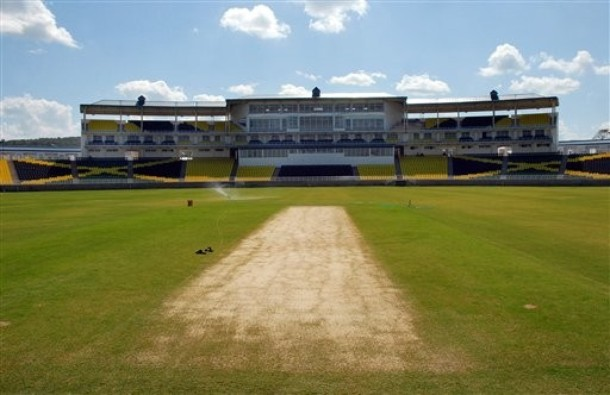
- Trelawny Stadium
- Interactive map of Trelawny Stadium

Ground information
- Location: Trelawny, Jamaica
- Coordinates: 18.4728523°N 77.6312828°W
- Establishment: 2007
- Capacity: 10,000 (up to 25,000 with temporary seating)
- Owner: Government of Jamaica
- Architect: Hok Sve, Denver, USA
- Operator: West Indies Cricket Board
- End names
- n/a

International information
- First women's ODI: 8 October 2016: West Indies v England
- Last women's ODI: 10 October 2016: West Indies v England
- As of 1 September 2020; Source: CricketArchive

Trelawny Stadium is a multi-purpose stadium in Trelawny, Jamaica that was completed in 2007. It has a capacity of 25,000 people.

It was built under an agreement between Jamaica and the People's Republic of China, that saw the PRC Government put up at least US$30-million needed for the project.

It is mostly used for cricket. The stadium hosted warm-up matches during the 2007 Cricket World Cup, as well as the opening ceremony of the championship, but has not hosted an official men’s international cricket match.

The stadium has also been used by the Jamaica national football team as a second venue. The Reggae Boyz played a World Cup qualifier here against the Bahamas national football team in 2008 and the stadium hosted group matches in the 2008 Caribbean Cup.

The ground hosted its first international cricket matches when West Indies women's cricket team took on England women's cricket team in two Women's ODI at the stadium. This was the first major event post 2007 Cricket World Cup.

In December 2019, Cricket West Indies (CWI) confirmed that the venue would host matches in the 2019–20 West Indies Championship, after a gap of eleven years.

The stadium also hosts shows and concerts, as the Jamaica blues festival with guests like Celine Dion in 2012 for example.
