= List of football clubs in Jamaica =

This is a list of football clubs in Jamaica.

All information is taken from the rsssf.com database for the 2006/2007 season.

== Wray and Nephew Jamaica Premier League ==
=== Wray and Nephew Jamaica Premier League 2026/2027 ===
- Arnett Gardens
- Cavalier
- Chapelton Maroons
- Dunbeholden
- Harbour View
- Humble Lions
- Molynes Utd
- Montego Bay Utd
- Mount Pleasant
- Portmore Utd
- Racing Utd
- Tivoli Gardens
- Treasure Beach
- Tru Juice
- Waterhouse

== Parish Confederations Super Leagues ==
=== KSAFA Confederation Super League ===
- Barbican F.C.
- Boys' Town F.C.
- Brown’s Town F.C.
- Central Kingston F.C.
- Constant Spring F.C.
- Liguanea United F.C.
- Meadforest F.C.
- Olympic Gardens F.C.
- Real Mona F.C.
- Rockforth F.C.
- Santos F.C.
- Seaview Gardens F.C.

=== South Central Confederation Super League ===
- Arlington F.C.
- Dunbeholden F.C.
- George's Valley F.C.
- Humble Lions F.C.
- Los Perfectos F.C.
- New Green F.C.
- Newland F.C.
- Original Hazard F.C.
- Rivoli United F.C.
- Sporting Central F.C. (winners)
- Tafari Lions F.C.
- Value Pare F.C. (withdrew due to a conflict with the Confederation)

=== Eastern Confederation Super League ===
- (Albion Fc)
- Axum F.C.
- Bath F.C.
- Brazil F.C.
- Iyante F.C.
- Manchioneal F.C.
- Port Morant F.C.
- Star Cosmos F.C.
- St. George's F.C.
- York F.C. (champion of the east)

=== Western Confederation Super League ===
- Bamboo F.C.
- Black Diamonds
- Clarks Town F.C.
- Grange Hill F.C.
- Granville F.C. (winners)
- Harmony F.C.
- Holland F.C.
- Montpellier F.C.
- Mount Salem F.C.
- Negril F.C.
- Orange Hill F.C.
- Salt Spring F.C.
- Sandy Bay F.C.

== Third Level ==
=== KSAFA Major League ===
- Brown's Town F.C.
- Central Kingston F.C.
- Cooreville Gardens F.C.
- Elleston Flats F.C.
- Olympic Gardens F.C.
- Pembroke Hall F.C.
- Rae Town F.C.
- Real Mona F.C.
- Rockfort F.C.
- Seaview Gardens F.C.
- Shortwood United F.C.
- UTech/Papine F.C.
- New Kingston F.C.

=== Clarendon Major League ===
- Avengers F.C.
- Gayle F.C.
- Mitchell Town F.C.
- Morgan's Pass F.C.
- Name Brand F.C.
- New Bowens F.C.
- New Longsville F.C.
- Springfield F.C.
- Tollgate F.C.
- Wood Hall F.C.
- Race Track F.C.

=== Hanover Major League ===
- Lucea F.C.
- Logwood United F.C.
- Logwood Galaxy F.C.
- Central F.C.
- Chamber Pen F.C.
- COGP F.C.
- Concrete F.C.
- Excel F.C.
- Haddington F.C.
- Lookout F.C.
- Prosper F.C.
- Superstar F.C.

=== Manchester Major League ===
- Downs F.C.
- Harmons F.C.
- Hillstar F.C.
- Kendal F.C.
- Mandeville United F.C.
- Mile Gully F.C.
- Porus F.C.
- Villa United
- May Day F.C.

=== Portland Major League ===
- Eagle Strikers F.C.
- Fairy Hill F.C.
- Norwich F.C.
- Progressive F.C.(JUNGLES)
- Snow Hill F.C.
- Taurus F.C.

=== St. Ann Major League ===
- Benfica F.C.
- DC United F.C.
- FC Ocho Rios
- Golden Kickers F.C.
- Great Pond F.C.
- Juventus F.C.
- Lewis Strikers F.C.
- Parry Town F.C.
- Raising Star F.C.
- St. Ann Bauxite F.C.
- Standfast F.C.
- Volvo F.C.
- York Castle High F.C.
- Chalky Hill United F.C.
- Steer Town F.C

=== St. Catherine Major League ===
- Albion F.C.
- Black Lions F.C.
- Bodles F.C.
- Central Links F.C.
- Independence City F.C.
- Meadows F.C.
- McKay New Raiders F.C.
- Portmore Gardens F.C.
- Rodwood F.C.
- Tru Juice F.C.
- Waterloo F.C.
- Windsor Lion F.C.
- Royal Lakes F.C.
- Money pro F.C.
- Old Harbour United F.C.

=== St. Elizabeth Major League ===
- Appleton Estate F.C.
- Balaclava United F.C.
- Black River F.C.
- Epping Forest F.C.
- Haughton United F.C.
- Holland Police Youth Club F.C.
- Middle Quarters F.C.
- New River United F.C.
- Rasta Camp F.C.
- STETHS F.C.
- Super Action F.C.
- Young Brazil F.C.

=== St. James Major League ===
Cambridge United F.C.

- Altobar F.C.
- Catherine Hall F.C.
- Champions F.C.
- Fogo United F.C.
- Juniors F.C.
- Maldon F.C.
- Melbourne F.C.
- Montego Bay Boys' Club F.C.
- Mountain Villa F.C.
- Reggae Lions F.C.
- Seba United Youths F.C.
- Tomorrow's People F.C.
- Violet Kickers F.C.
- Salt spring F.C.
- Seaview F.C.

=== St. Mary Major League ===
- Albany F.C.
- Albion Mountain F.C.
- Enfield F.C.
- Four Five F.C.
- Frazerwood F.C.
- Hard Hitters F.C.
- Rangers "A" F.C.
- Yellow Stars F.C.

=== St. Thomas Major League ===
- Paul Bogle F.C.
- Danvers Pen F.C.
- Delta Force F.C.
- Kool Kat F.C.
- Leith Hall F.C.
- Lyssons United F.C.
- Prospect F.C.
- Real Morant F.C.
- White Horses Upliftment F.C.
- Yallahs United F.C.

=== Trelawny Major League ===
- Brits United F.C.
- Daniel Town FC
- Duanvale F.C.
- Flames F.C.
- Harmony F.C.
- Kinloss F.C.
- Invaders United F.C. (withdrew due to severe financial constraints)
- Lacers F.C.
- Preston United F.C.
- Spicy Hill F.C.
- Studs United F.C.
- Unity F.C.
- Upsetters F.C.

=== Westmoreland Major League ===
- Central Communities F.C.
- Chantilly F.C.
- Frome F.C.
- Mount Grace F.C.
- New Market Oval F.C.
- Paul Island F.C.
- Petersfield F.C.
- Roaring River F.C.
- Robins River F.C.
- Russia F.C.
- Straths F.C.
- Three Miles River F.C.

== Fourth Level ==
=== KSAFA Syd Bartlett League ===
- Allman/Woodford F.C.
- Gordon Town F.C.
- Island Special Constabulary Force F.C.
- Liguanea F.C.
- Maxfield Park F.C.
- Meadforest F.C.
- New Kingston F.C.
- Port Royal F.C.
- Swallowfield F.C.
- University of the West Indies F.C.
- Whitfield Town F.C.

=== St. Catherine Division One ===
- Braeton F.C.
- Cumberland F.C.
- Flamingo F.C.
- Hopeview F.C.
- McCook's Pen F.C.
- National Irrigation F.C.
- Old Harbour Bay Allstars F.C.
- Passagefort F.C.
- Police F.C.
- Southborough F.C.
- Spring Village F.C.
- Travellers F.C.

== Fifth Level ==
=== Portmore Division Two ===
- Caymanas Garden F.C.
- Christian Pen F.C.
- Daytona F.C.
- East Portmore Portals F.C.
- Greater Portmore F.C.
- Hellshire United F.C.
- Newtown Braeton F.C.
- Passagefort F.C.
- Portmore Pines F.C.
- Portsmouth F.C.
- Waterford F.C.
- Watson Grove F.C.
- Bleachers F.C.
