= Jamaican football league system =

The Jamaican football league system is the national football competition system in Jamaica. It is organized by the Jamaica Football Federation.

The Jamaica National Premier League is the top-flight of football in Jamaica

Below this, the clubs are separated on geographical grounds. Dependent on which parish a club is located in, it is a member of a specific confederation.

- Clubs from the parishes of Kingston and St. Andrew are members of the Kingston and St. Andrew Football Association (KSAFA).
- Clubs from the parishes of Clarendon, Manchester, St. Catherine and St. Elizabeth are members of the South Central Confederation.
- Clubs from the parishes of Portland, St. Ann, St. Mary and St. Thomas are members of the Eastern Confederation.
- Clubs from the parishes of Hanover, St. James, Trelawny and Westmoreland are members of the Western Confederation.

Each of these four confederations operates their own Super League and they represent the second level of Jamaican football.

The names of these four Super Leagues are:

- KSAFA Super League
- South Central Confederation Super League
- Eastern Confederation Super League
- Western Confederation Super League

The winners of these leagues play off against each other, home and away, with the top two teams replacing the bottom two teams relegated from the Premier League.

Teams relegated from the Premier League enter the Super League of the Confederation they belong to.

The third level of Jamaican football is organised by the parish football associations.

In the parishes of Kingston and St. Andrew, KSAFA has a third level league called the KSAFA Major League.

For the remaining 12 parishes, the third level of football is represented by a major league competition in each parish organised by the parish FA to give 13 third level leagues.

The champions of each parish are promoted to play in the super league of the confederation by right or by way of winning a play off against another parish champion(s) in the same confederation.

At the fourth level of Jamaican football, KSAFA is represented by the KSAFA Syd Bartlett League. The other parishes have a Division One league to give 13 fourth Level leagues.

Some parishes operate leagues at the fifth level.

Promotion and relegation rules between leagues can vary due to the geographic nature of the league system.

Level	League(s)/Division(s)												
1	Jamaica Premier League; 14 clubs												
2	JFF Championship; 14 clubs												
3	KSAFA Super League (JN/KSAFA Super League); 12 clubs	South Central Confederation Super League (Super Plus South Central Confederation Super League); 12 clubs				Eastern Confederation Super League (Coronation Bakery Eastern Confederation Super League); 9 clubs				Western Confederation Super League (Captain's Bakery Western Confederation Super League); 13 clubs			
4	KSAFA Major League (JN/KSAFA Major League); 12 clubs	Clarendon Major League; 10 clubs	Manchester Major League; 7 clubs	St. Catherine Major League; 12 clubs	St. Elizabeth Major League; 12 clubs	Portland Major League; 7 clubs	St. Ann Major League; 11 clubs	St. Mary Major League; 8 clubs	St. Thomas Major League; 10 clubs	Hanover Major League; 10 clubs	St. James Senior League; 12 clubs	Trelawny Major League; 12 clubs	Westmoreland Major League; 12 clubs
5	KSAFA Syd Bartlett League (JN/KSAFA Syd Bartlett League); 11 clubs	Clarendon Division 1	Manchester Division 1	St. Catherine Division 1; 12 clubs	St. Elizabeth Division 1	Portland Division 1	St. Ann Division 1	St. Mary Division 1	St. Thomas Division 1	Hanover Division 1	St. James Division 1	Trelawny Division 1	Westmoreland Division 1
6	No KSAFA league at this level	Parish Second Divisions											

== See also ==
- Football in Jamaica
