= Fabian Dawkins =

Jamaican footballer (born 1981)

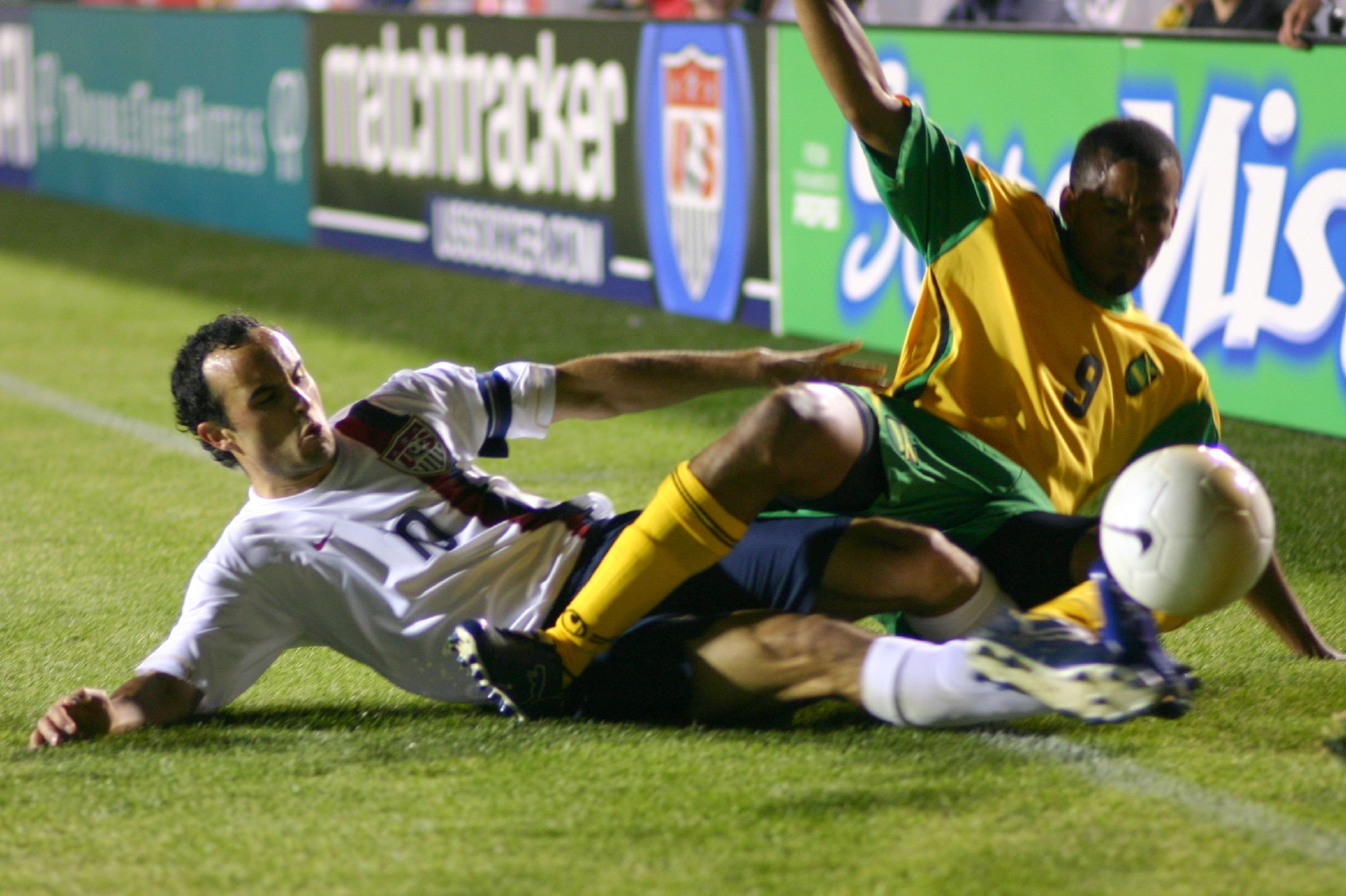
- Dawkins (right) playing for Jamaica in 2006

Personal information
- Date of birth: 7 February 1981 (age 45)
- Place of birth: Duncans, Trelawny, Jamaica
- Height: 5 ft 8 in (1.73 m)

Senior career*
Years	Team	Apps	(Gls)
2000–2005	Village United	–	(–)
2005	Atlanta Silverbacks	26	(15)
2005–2006	Village United	15	(13)
2006	Atlanta Silverbacks	15	(1)
2007	Montreal Impact	9	(0)
2007	→ Trois-Rivières Attak (loan)	1	(0)
2007	Village United	0	(0)
2008	Richmond Kickers	4	(3)
2009	Village United F.C.	5	(0)
2010	August Town F.C.	12	(0)
2010–2011	Arnett Gardens F.C.	3	(0)

International career
2001–2006	Jamaica	17	(1)
- * Club domestic league appearances and goals

Fabian Dawkins (born 7 February 1981) is a Jamaican former footballer.

== Club career ==
Dawkins grew up in August Town, St. Andrew and attended Jamaica College. Nicknamed 'Renaldo', the attacking midfielder started his career at Village United F.C. in the Jamaica National Premier League, where he became their leading goalscorer for three seasons running. He then moved abroad with former Village teammate Shane Crawford to play two seasons for the Atlanta Silverbacks. He later joined the Montreal Impact in the USL First Division, where he was later traded in January 2007 with Jason McLaughlin for forward Mauricio Salles and Daniel Antoniuk. In 2007, he was loaned to the Impact's farm team the Trois-Rivières Attak of the Canadian Soccer League. He made his debut for the club on 3 June 2007 in a match against Portuguese Supra, which resulted in the club's first home victory by a score 4–2. In between the USL 1st division season, he went back to Jamaica to form a prolific strike partnerships with Newton Sterling and Teafore Bennett at Village United.

== International career ==
He appeared in the 2001 FIFA World Youth Championship in Argentina, where he captained the squad and scored their only goal of the tournament. He made his debut for the "Reggae Boyz" in 2001 against Grenada and has collected a total of 17 caps (scoring one goal) until October 2006.
