= FIFA Order of Merit =

Highest honour awarded by FIFA

- The FIFA Order of Merit

Awarded by FIFA
- Type: Order of merit
- Eligibility: Any individual
- Awarded for: "significant contribution to the development of association football"
- Status: Active
- Grades: 1

Statistics
- First induction: 1984
- Last induction: 2012
- Total inductees: 121

The FIFA Order of Merit is the highest honour awarded by FIFA. The award is presented at the annual FIFA congress. It is normally awarded to people who are considered to have made a significant contribution to association football.

At FIFA's centennial congress they made one award for every decade of their existence. These awards were also handed out to fans, organisations, clubs, and one to African Football. These were referred to as the FIFA Centennial Order of Merit.

The winner does not have to be directly involved with football to receive it. One such notable non-footballing personality was Nelson Mandela who won it for bringing South Africa back to international football.

== Recipients ==
=== Personalities directly involved in football ===
==== Associations ====
Recipient	Year	Nationality	Notes
Uruguayan Football Association	2004	Uruguay	Centennial Award in 2004
Confederation of African Football	2004		Centennial Award in 2004
International Football Association Board	2004		Centennial Award in 2004

==== Clubs ====
Recipient	Year	Nationality	Notes
Sheffield FC	2004	England	Centennial Award in 2004
Real Madrid	2004	Spain	Centennial Award in 2004

==== Players ====
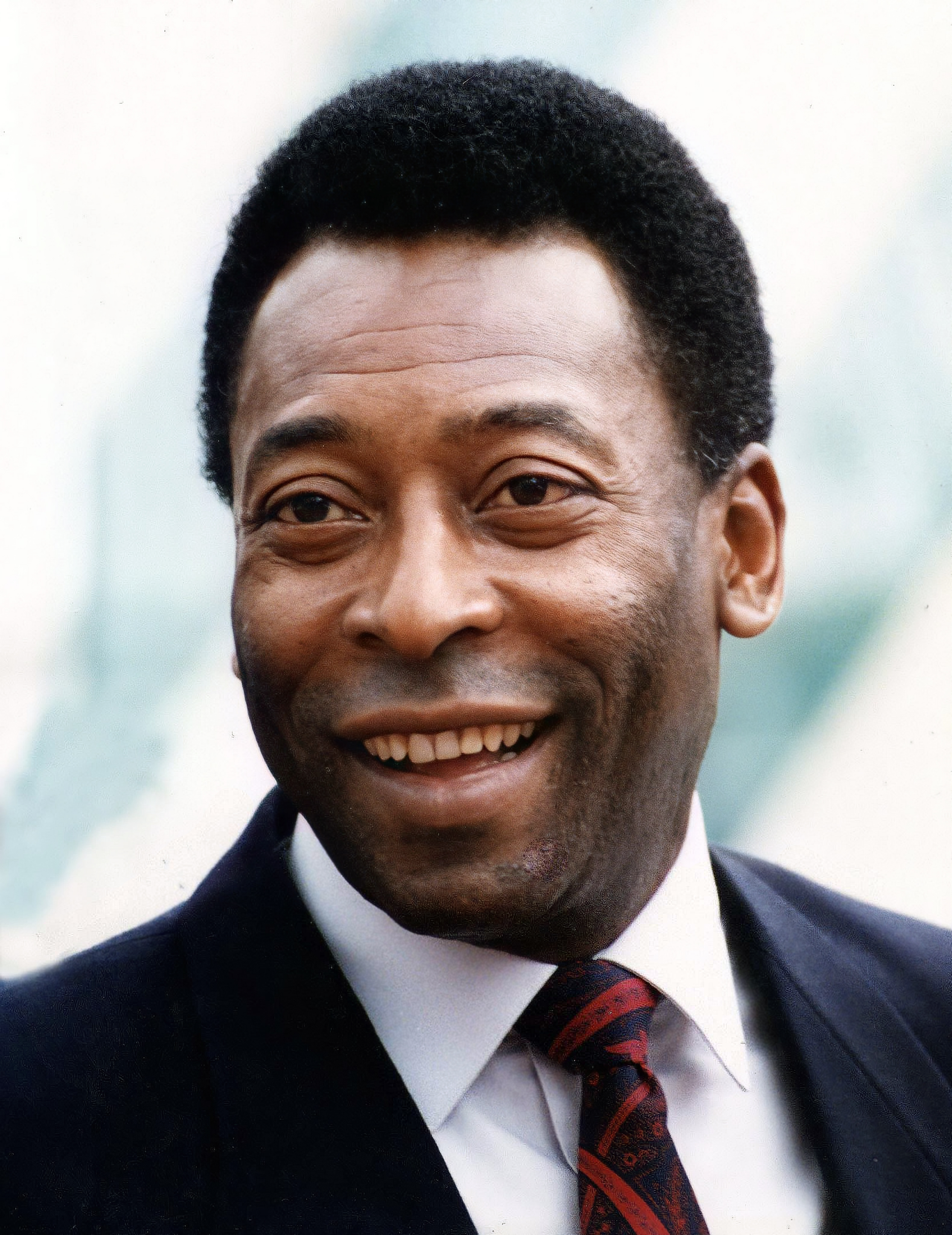
Pelé was named Athlete of the Century by the International Olympic Committee in 1999

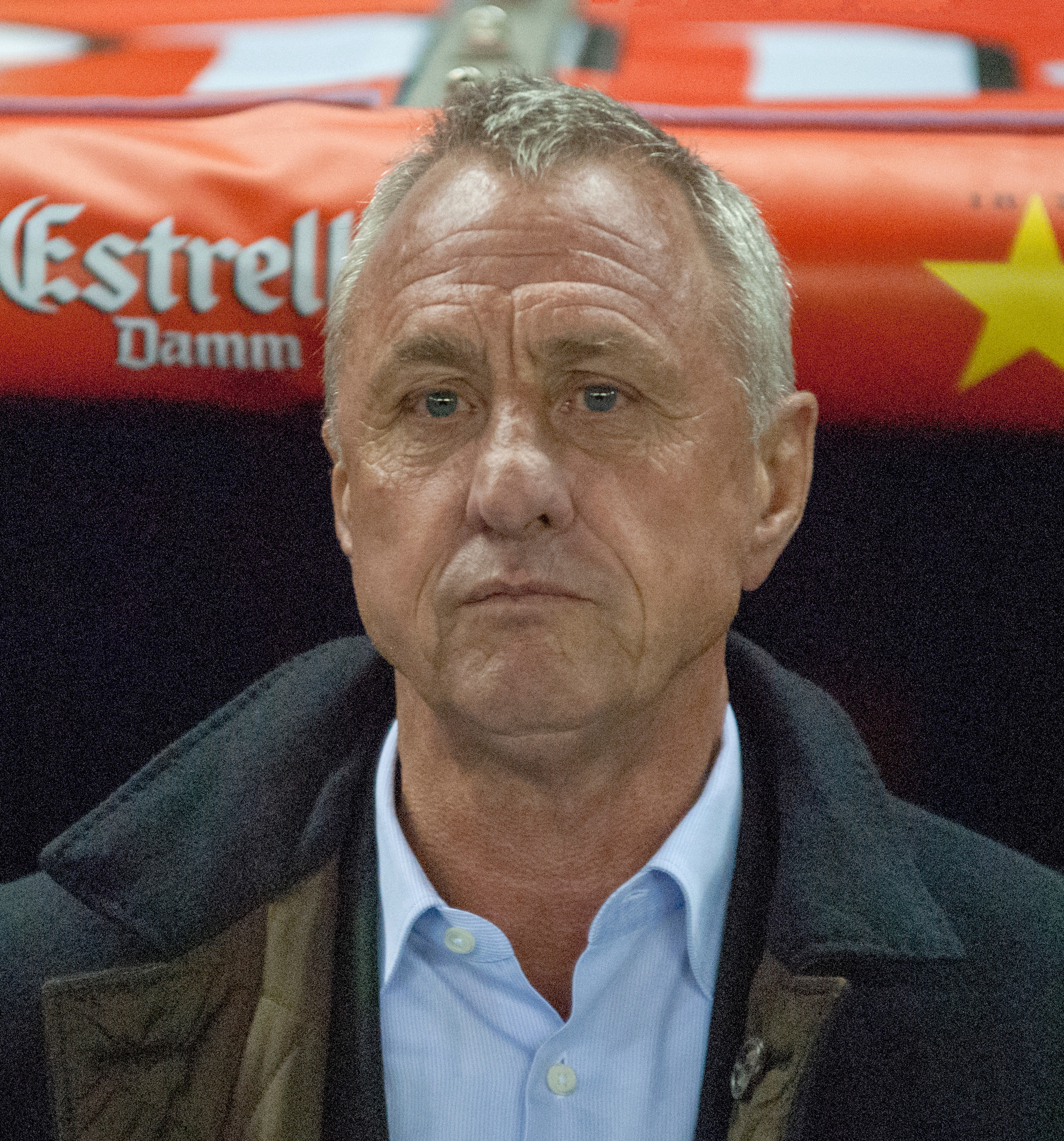
Johan Cruyff received the award for his contributions as both footballer and a coach

Recipient	Year	Nationality	Notes
Franz Beckenbauer*	1984, 2004	Germany	Centennial Award in 2004
Bobby Charlton	1984	England	
Pelé	1984, 2004	Brazil	Centennial Award in 2004
Dino Zoff	1984	Italy	
Lev Yashin	1988	Soviet Union	
Antonio Carbajal	1992	Mexico	
Sir Stanley Matthews	1992	England	
Francisco Varallo	1994	Argentina	
Alfredo Di Stéfano	1994	Argentina	
Fritz Walter	1994	Germany	
Ferenc Puskás	1994	Hungary	
Eusébio	1994	Portugal	
Just Fontaine	1994	France	
Gunn Nyborg	1994	Norway	
Obdulio Varela	1994	Uruguay	
Zico	1996	Brazil	
Bobby Moore	1996	England	
Salif Keita	1996	Mali	
Michelle Akers	1998	United States	
Larbi Benbarek	1998	Morocco	
Gilmar	1998	Brazil	
Gerd Müller	1998	Germany	
Ivan Toplak	2000	Slovenia	
David Kipiani	2002	Georgia	
Pradip Kumar Banerjee	2004	India	Centennial Award in 2004
Muhammad Umer	2004	Pakistan	Centennial Award in 2004
Hafizuddin Ahmed	2004	Bangladesh	Centennial Award in 2004
Lee Ramoon	2004	Cayman Islands	
Paolo Maldini	2008	Italy	
Johan Cruyff*	2010	Netherlands	
Steve Sumner	2010	New Zealand	Centennial Award in 2004
Alcides Ghiggia	2010	Uruguay	

==== Managers ====
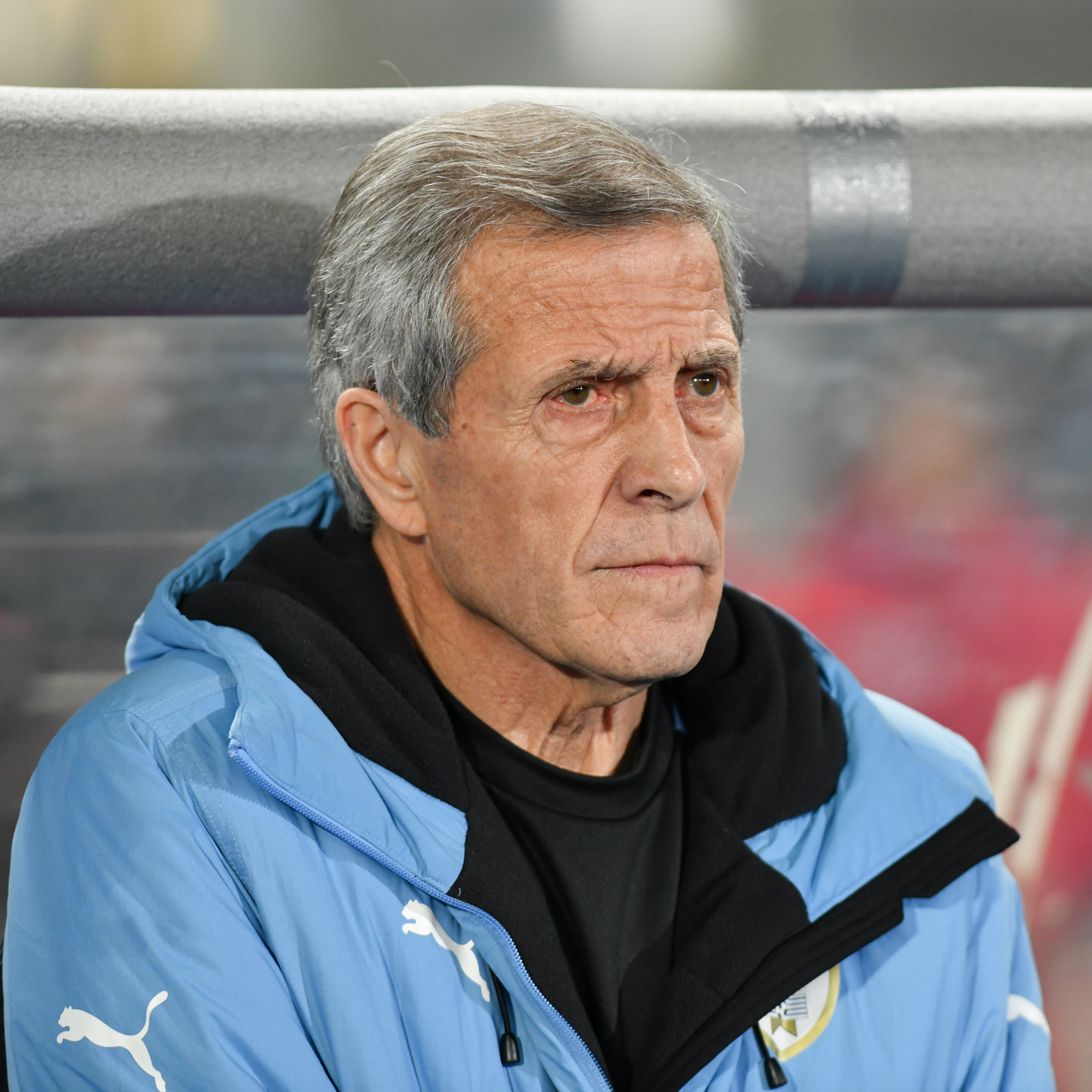
Oscar Tabaréz is the last person to receive the FIFA Order of Merit for his contributions as a coach

Recipient	Year	Nationality	Notes
Franz Beckenbauer*	1984, 2004	Germany	Centennial Award in 2004
Helmut Schön	1984	Germany	
Mário Zagallo	1992	Brazil	
Karl-Heinz Weigang	1998	Germany	
Miljan Miljanić*	2002	Serbia	
Valeriy Lobanovskyi	2003	Ukraine	
Sein Hlaing	2004	Myanmar	
Bobby Robson	2009	England	Emerald Award
Kazimierz Górski*	2006	Poland	
Nodar Akhalkatsi	2008	Georgia	
Johan Cruyff*	2010	Netherlands	
Winston Chung Fah	2012	Jamaica	
Óscar Tabárez	2012	Uruguay	

==== Referees ====
Recipient	Year	Nationality	Notes
Sir Stanley Rous*	1984	England	
Nikolay Latyshev	1987	Soviet Union	
Thomas Wharton	1992	Scotland	
Farouk Bouzo	1996	Syria	
Javier Arriaga Muñiz	1996	Mexico	
Fernando G. Álvarez	2005	Philippines	
Hari Raj Naicker	2012	Fiji	

=== Administrators ===
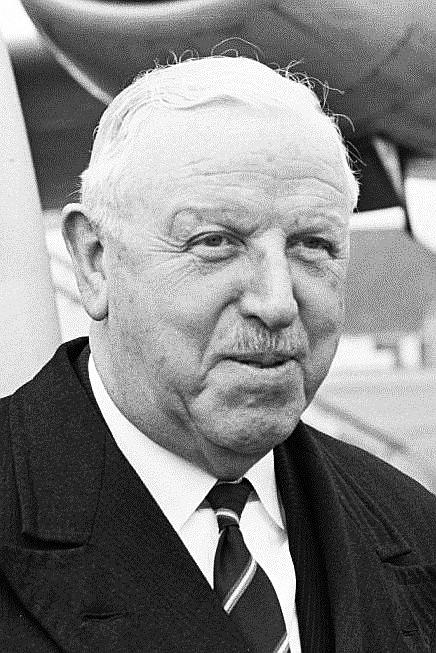
The 6th President of FIFA, Sir Stanley Rous was also serving as an international referee

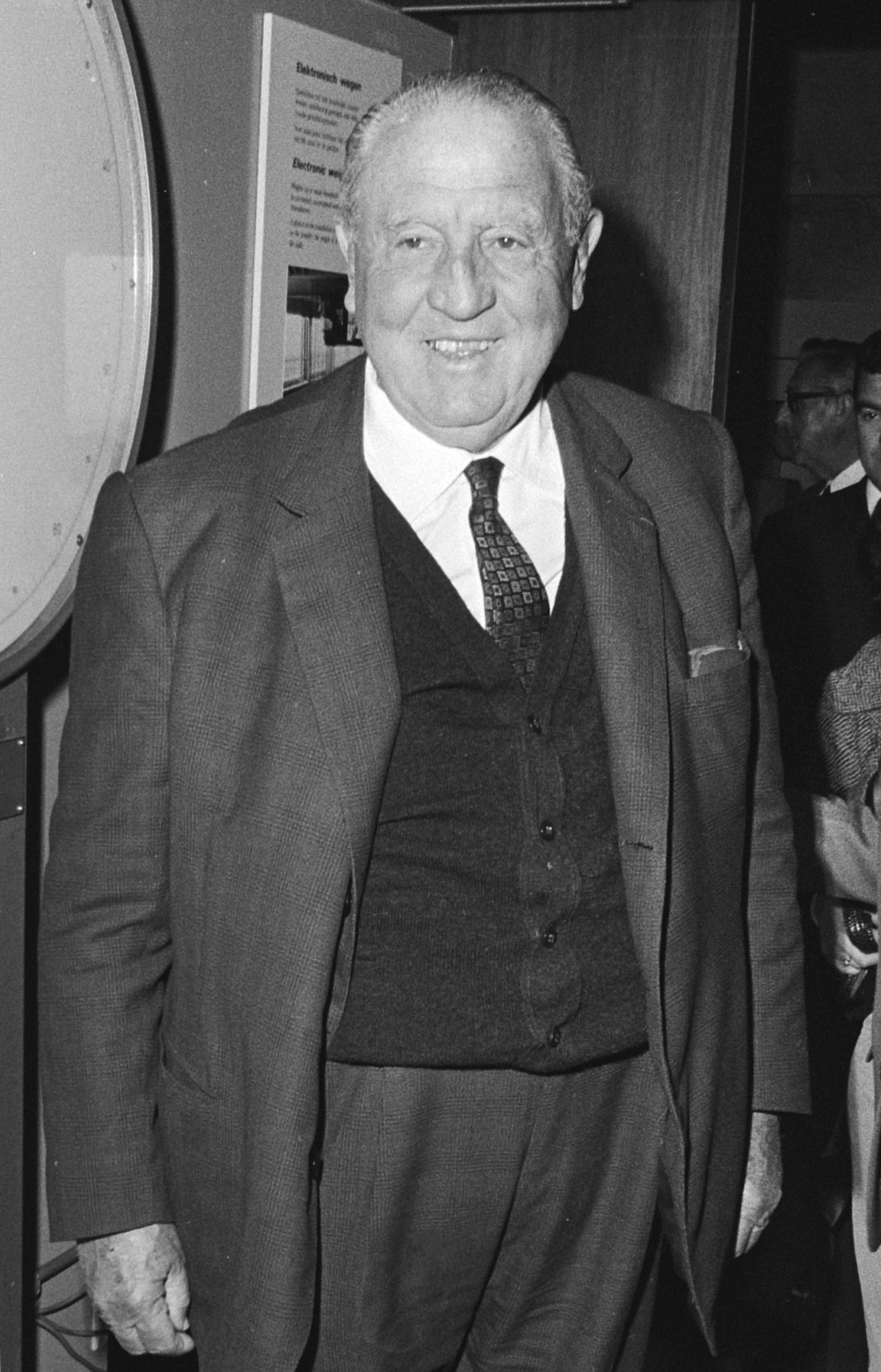
Santiago Bernabeu is generally considered the one to whom much of the credit can be given for transforming Real Madrid C.F. into the most successful football club in Spain and in Europe

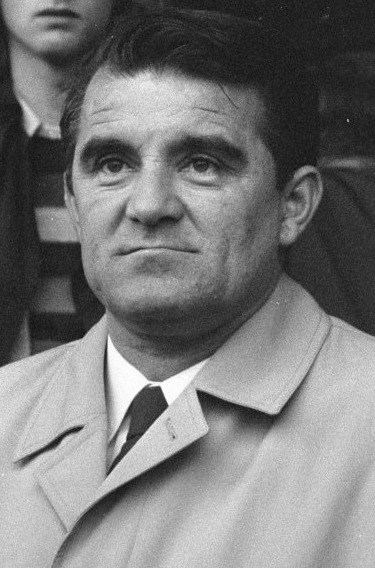
Miljan Miljanić became the recipient of the award posthumously for his contributions as a coach and the President of the Football Federation of Yugoslavia/Serbia

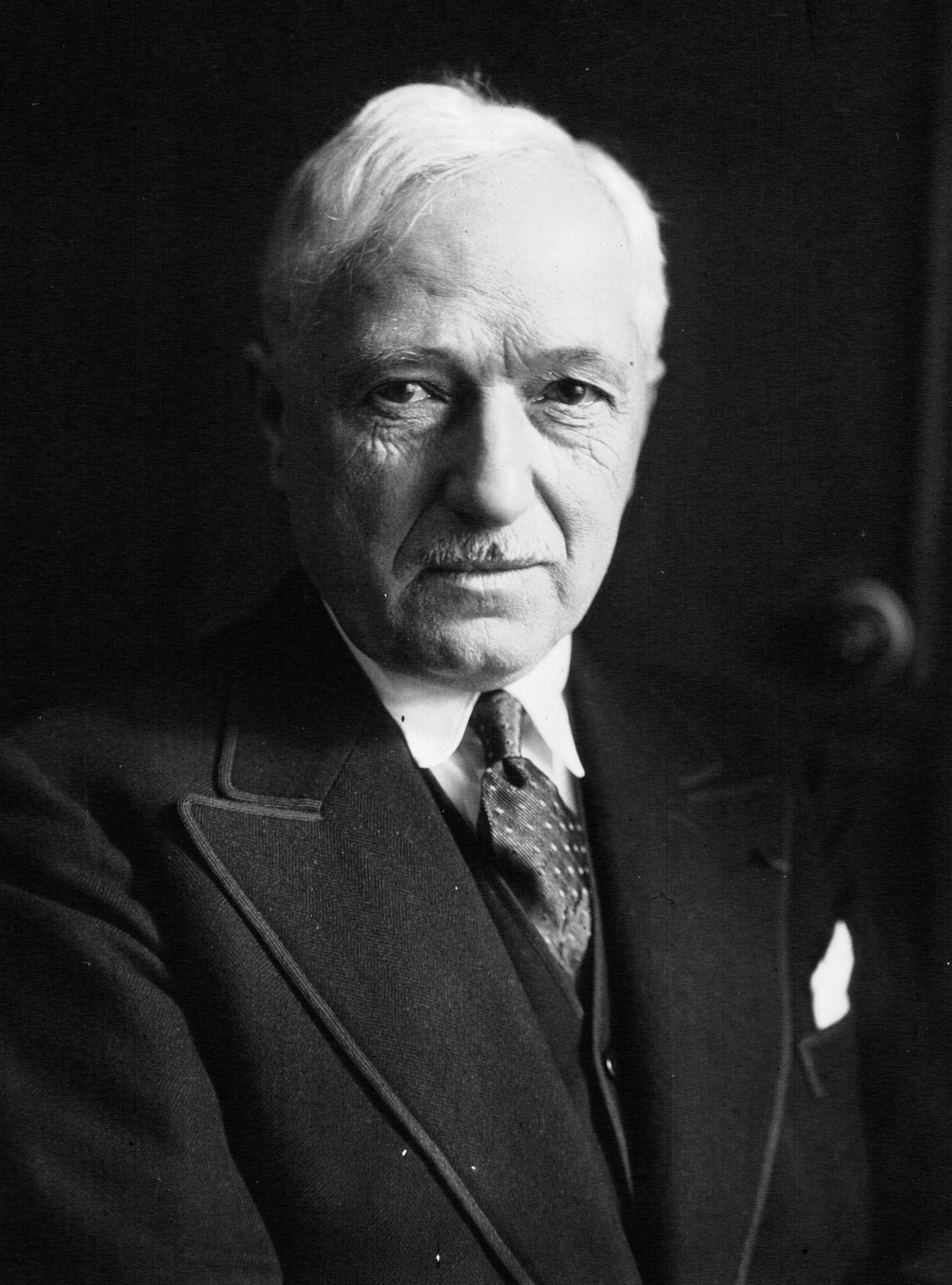
Jules Rimet is FIFA's longest-serving president and the initiator of the first FIFA World Cup

Recipient	Year	Nationality	Notes
Sir Stanley Rous*	1984	England	
Mihajlo Andrejević	1984	Yugoslavia	
Paulo Machado de Carvalho	1987	Brazil	
Ferdinand Hidalgo	1987	Ecuador	
Teófilo Salinas Fuller	1987	Peru	
Marat Gramov	1987	Soviet Union	
João Lyra Filho	1988	Brazil	
Pedro Escartín	1988	Spain	
Yidnekatchew Tessema	1988	Ethiopia	
K. Ziauddin	1992	India	
Shizuo Fujita	1992	Japan	
Juan José Russo	1992	Argentina	
Abdel Aziz Mostafa	1992	Egypt	
Sir Arthur George	1994	Australia	
Chen Chengda	1994	China	
Abdel Halim Mohamed	1994	Sudan	
Gene Edwards	1994	United States	
Vitali Smirnov	1995	Russia	
Maurice Burlaz	1996	France	
Henry Fok	1998	Hong Kong	
Julio Grondona	1998	Argentina	
Vyacheslav Koloskov	1998	Russia	
Bert Millichip	1998	England	
Guillermo Cañedo de la Bárcena	1998	Mexico	
Abilio d'Almeida	2000	Brazil	
Josep Lluís Núñez	2000	Spain	
Nabon Noor	2000	Indonesia	
Azrikam Miltchan	2000	Israel	
Horace Burrell	2000	Jamaica	
Faisal bin Fahd	2000	Saudi Arabia	
Etubom Oyo Orok Oyo	2000	Nigeria	
Nikita Simonyan	2000	Russia	
Juan Antonio Samaranch	2001	Spain	
José Ermírio de Moraes Filho	2002	Brazil	
Jim Fleming	2002	Canada	
Mohamed Khalil El Deeb	2002	Egypt	
Santiago Bernabéu	2002	Spain	
Miljan Miljanić	2002	Serbia	
Hans Ernst Bangerter	2002	Switzerland	
René Hüssy	2002	Switzerland	
Miljan Miljanić*	2002	Serbia	
Johnny Warren	2004	Australia	Centennial Award in 2004
João Havelange	2004	Brazil	Centennial Award in 2004
Jules Rimet	2004	France	Centennial Award in 2004
Fahad Al-Ahmed Al-Jaber Al-Sabah	2004	Kuwait	
Jan Peeters	2006	Belgium	
Issa Hayatou	2006	Cameroon	
Egidius Braun	2006	Germany	
Oscar Thamar Torres	2006	Guatemala	
Saburō Kawabuchi	2006	Japan	
Hamzah Abu Samah	2006	Malaysia	
Guyedre Wamedjo	2006	New Caledonia	
Per Ravn Omdal	2006	Norway	
Kazimierz Górski*	2006	Poland	
Aleksei Paramonov	2006	Russia	
Alan Rothenberg	2006	United States	
Nicolás Abumohor	2008	Chile	
Zhang Jilong	2008	China	
Isaac David Sasso Sasso	2008	Costa Rica	
Nodar Akhalkatsi	2008	Georgia	
Helen Leuthardt-Petermann	2008	Switzerland	
Leszek Rylski	2009	Poland	Ruby Award*
Lisle Austin	2010	Barbados	
Holger Obermann	2010	Germany	
Junji Ogura	2010	Japan	
Molefi Oliphant	2010	South Africa	
Gerhard Mayer-Vorfelder	2012	Germany	
György Szepesi	2012	Hungary	
Ahmad Shah of Pahang	2012	Malaysia	
Godfried Foli Ekue	2012	Togo	

*in diamond, ruby or emerald

=== Other individuals ===
Recipient	Year	Nationality	Notes
Roberto Marinho	1987	Brazil	
Everwijn van Steeden	1987	England	
Emilio Azcárraga Milmo	1987	Mexico	
Diego Lucero	1987	Uruguay	
Pedro Ramírez Vázquez	1988	Mexico	
Karl-Heinz Heimann	1992	Germany	
Walter Lutz	1992	Switzerland	
Henry Kissinger	1996	United States	
Douglas Ivester	1996	United States	
Udo Jürgens	1996	Austria	
Fernand Sastre	1998	France	
Nelson Mandela	1998	South Africa	
Erwin Himmelseher	2000	Germany	
Kofi Annan	2002	Ghana	
Thaksin Shinawatra	2004	Thailand	
Robert Louis-Dreyfus	2006	France	
Otto Schily	2006	Germany	
Rudi Michel	2006	Germany	
Mohammed Yusuf	2008	Fiji	
Alpha Oumar Konaré	2008	Mali	
Thabo Mbeki	2010	South Africa	

=== Other collectives ===
Recipient	Year	Nationality	Notes
Television	2004		Centennial Award in 2004
The City of Sheffield	2004	England	Centennial Award in 2004
Fans of Japan	2004	Japan	Centennial Award in 2004
Fans of Korea	2004	South Korea	Centennial Award in 2004

=== Commercial brands ===
Recipient	Year	Nationality	Notes
Adidas	2004	Germany	Centennial Award in 2004
Coca-Cola	2004	United States	Centennial Award in 2004
Association Internationale de la Presse Sportive	2004	France	Centennial Award in 2004
