= Duhaney Park F.C. =

Jamaican football club

- Full name: Duhaney Park Football Club
- Ground: Baldwin Crescent, Duhaney Park, Jamaica
- Capacity: 100
- Coach: null
- League: KSAFA Super League
- 2024–25: 8th
Home colours

Duhaney Park Football Club is a Jamaican football club that plays in the KSAFA Super League. Duhaney Park came second in the KSAFA Major League in the 2023–24 season with being promoted to the KSAFA Super League.

== History ==
The club was one of the first clubs in the Jamaica National Premier League when the League went semi-professional in 2000, but was relegated back to the second division (i.e. KSAFA Super League) after the 2001–02 season. The team is based in the vibrant community of Duhaney Park in Kingston, Jamaica. The club is a registered company and enjoys strong support from the communities it represents, which includes Duhaney Park, Patrick Gardens, Washington Gardens, New Haven and Duhaney Meadows.

== Achievements ==
- KSAFA Major League: 1

1999/00

- KSAFA Syd Bartlett League: 3

1987/88, 1989/90, 1993/94

- KSAFA Jackie Bell Knockout Competition: 1

1990/91

== Rivalries ==
Throughout its history, the club has developed a local rivalry with cross-town club Maverley/Hughenden, which also competes in the KSAFA Super League. Matches between the two clubs are known as The Kingston 20 Derby.
