= Damian Williams =

Damon, Damion, Damien or Damian Williams may refer to:

- Damian "Football" Williams (born 1973), participant in 1992 Los Angeles Riots
- Damian Williams (lawyer) (born 1980), American lawyer and United States attorney for the Southern District of New York
- Damion Williams (born 1981), Jamaican soccer player
- Damian Williams (wide receiver) (born 1988), American football wide receiver
- Damien Williams (born 1992), American football running back

== See also ==
- Damon Williams (born 1973), American basketball power forward
