= Shawn Lawes =

Jamaican footballer (born 1993)

Personal information
- Date of birth: 3 July 1993 (age 33)
- Height: 1.83 m (6 ft 0 in)
- Position: Defender

Team information
- Current team: Waterhouse

Senior career*
Years	Team	Apps	(Gls)
2012–2014	Arnett Gardens	4	(0)
2014–2015	Barbican	20	(1)
2015–2016	Cavalier	28	(0)
2016–2017	Reno	12	(0)
2017–	Waterhouse	30	(1)

International career^{‡}
2018–	Jamaica	4	(0)
- * Club domestic league appearances and goals as of 16:22, 4 February 2019 (UTC) ‡ National team caps and goals as of 11:16, 15 March 2021 (UTC)

Shawn Lawes (born 3 July 1993) is a Jamaican international footballer who plays for Waterhouse, as a defender.

== Career ==
Lawes has played club football for Arnett Gardens, Barbican, Cavalier, Reno and Waterhouse.

He made his international debut for Jamaica in 2018.
