= Christopher Ziadie =

Jamaican footballer (1967–2022)

Personal information
- Full name: Christopher Patrick Ziadie
- Date of birth: 8 July 1967
- Place of birth: Kingston, Jamaica
- Date of death: 18 September 2022 (aged 55)
- Place of death: Florida, United States
- Position: Midfielder

Youth career
- 1980–1985: St. George’s College

College career
Years	Team	Apps	(Gls)
1985–1986	Suffield Academy		
1986–1989	Columbia Lions		

Senior career*
Years	Team	Apps	(Gls)
- Kingston Lions
	Boys’ Town		(Constant Spring F.C)

International career
- Jamaica U17
- Jamaica U20
- Jamaica U23
1992–1993	Jamaica	6	(0)

Managerial career
- Real Mona
- Jamaica U20 (assistant)
- Waterhouse
- * Club domestic league appearances and goals

Christopher Patrick Ziadie (8 July 1967 – 18 September 2022) was a Jamaican professional football player and manager who played as a midfielder. He made six appearances for the Jamaica national team.

== Coaching career ==
Following his retirement, Ziadie went into management, being named assistant coach of the Jamaica under-20 team in 1999, having previously been coaching Real Mona. He was also head coach at Waterhouse.

== Personal life ==
Hailing from a footballing family, Ziadie's father was former Jamaican international Dennis Ziadie. His brothers Craig and Nick also represented Jamaica.

While giving a speech at the Columbia University's athletic awards banquet in 1989, Ziadie caused uproar when he gave a speech offending a number of people. His speech was stopped mid-way through by athletic director Al Paul, after numerous people had already left the banquet in protest, and fencer David Mandell had thrown a chair on stage.

== Death ==
Chris Ziadie died of lung cancer on 18 September 2022, in the United States at age 55 after a short illness. He was survived by his son Ryan and his daughter Chelsea.

== Career statistics ==
Appearances and goals by national team and year
National team	Year	Apps	Goals
Jamaica	1992	4	0
Jamaica	1993	2	0
Total		6	0
