= Luca Levee =

Jamaican footballer (born 1997)

Personal information
- Full name: John Luca Levee
- Date of birth: 21 February 1997 (age 29)
- Place of birth: Kingston, Jamaica
- Height: 1.80 m (5 ft 11 in)
- Position: Midfielder

Youth career
- Real Mona
- 2011–2013: Valencia
- 2013: Huracán Valencia
- –2015: Milton Academy

College career
Years	Team	Apps	(Gls)
2016–2018	Maryland Terrapins	12	(0)

Senior career*
Years	Team	Apps	(Gls)
2019–2021	Harbour View	33	(1)
2022–2023	Dulwich Hamlet	8	(0)

International career^{‡}
2012–2013	Jamaica U17	2	(0)
2015	Jamaica U20	4	(0)
2019	Jamaica U23	2	(0)
2021	Jamaica	1	(0)
- * Club domestic league appearances and goals as of 13:46, 1 June 2022 (UTC) ‡ National team caps and goals as of 22:53, 25 March 2021 (UTC)

John Luca Levee (born 21 February 1997) is a Jamaican footballer who played as a midfielder for Harbour View in Jamaica and briefly at non league level in England with Dulwich Hamlet. He is currently Assistant Coach of Waterhouse FC in the Jamaican Premier League.

== Club career ==
Levee started his career at Real Mona, before spending three years with Spanish side Valencia, after finishing as one of the top three performers at a camp. Following his spell with Valencia, Levee had a short spell with Huracán Valencia.

After his time in Spain, Levee moved to the United States to play soccer at Milton Academy. He led the team to a 22-0 unbeaten season and was named boys' soccer player of the year. He committed to playing soccer at the University of Maryland, and made a total of 12 appearances for the university's soccer team, The Terrapins.

Levee returned to Jamaica to sign with Harbour View in 2019.

On 28 January 2022, Levee signed with English National League South side Dulwich Hamlet.

Following multiple knee injuries Levee transitioned into coaching.

== International career ==
Levee has caps for Jamaica at various youth levels.

He made his full international debut in a 4–1 loss to the United States on 25 March 2021, coming on as a second-half substitute for Jamal Lowe.

== Career statistics ==
=== Club ===
As of matches played 8 February 2022

Club	Season	League			Cup		Other		Total	
Club	Season	Division	Apps	Goals	Apps	Goals	Apps	Goals	Apps	Goals
Harbour View	2018–19	National Premier League	8	0	0	0	0	0	8	0
Harbour View	2019–20	National Premier League	20	1	0	0	0	0	20	1
Harbour View	2021	National Premier League	5	0	0	0	0	0	5	0
Harbour View	Total		33	1	0	0	0	0	33	1
Dulwich Hamlet	2021–22	National League South	8	0	0	0	0	0	8	0
Career total			41	1	0	0	0	0	41	1

=== International ===
As of match played 25 March 2021.

National team	Year	Apps	Goals
Jamaica	2021	1	0
Total		1	0

== Honors ==
- NCAA Men's Division I Soccer Championship:
  - Winner (1): 2018
