= Meadhaven United F.C. =

Jamaican football team

Meadhaven United
- Full name: Meadhaven United F.C.
- Nickname: Blue Eagle
- Founded: 1977
- Ground: Michigan Oval, Meadowbrook; Kingston, Jamaica
- Chairman: Peter Beckford
- Manager: Alrick Clarke
- League: KSAFA Super League
- 2008–2009: Digicel Premier League, 11th (relegated)
Home colours	Away colours

Meadhaven United is a Jamaican football team which played in the top flight Jamaica National Premier League, in the 2008–09 season.

It is based in the Meadowbrook district of Kingston, Jamaica, but need to play their home matches at Constant Spring due to a lack of stands at their Michigan Oval home ground.

== History ==
The club was founded in March 1977 by a group of 15-year-old youngsters from the Meadowbrook and Havendale community. Led by Michael Dyche, Christopher Hunt, George Ballin and Gary Steadman they approached University of the West Indies Student David Hunt to be their coach and he agreed. Playing under the name Meadowbrook United they participated in the President's Cup a qualifying competition for the under 17 Minor League. The team subsequently won their zone and thus qualified for the Minor League the following year.

From this initial success senior footballers were spurred into action and a clubs called Spectrum and Hal-Haven were formed between in late 1977 and early 1978. Hal-Haven coached by David Hunt won the S.D.C Under 19 competition and Spectrum coached by Arthur Clarke won the over 19 competitions. In March 1978 the teams pooled resources and formed the Meadowbrook and Havendale Sports Association and competed under the new name Meadhaven United. The club over the years has produced several national team players at both the junior and senior levels.

They won promotion to the top level in summer 2008 when they won the NPL play-off series ahead of fellow qualifiers, Rivoli United F.C. During this successful season, in October 2007, founding member, former president and technical director David Hunt died of an apparent heart-attack.

Meadhaven had trouble in attracting sponsorship ahead of their first NPL season. They only lasted one season at the top level, they got relegated after the season's play-offs.

== Achievements ==
- 1979 : KSAFA MinorLeague Competition – Third place & Most Disciplined Team
- 1982 : Florida Competition First place U12 & Under 14 teams
- 1982/83 : KSAFA Major League Most Improved Team
- 1983 : Florida Competition 2nd Place Under 16 Team
- 1984 : 3rd Pl Minor League and 1st Minor League Knockout Competition
- 1986 : 3rd Minor League and 2nd Minor League Knockout
- 1987 : 3rd Minor League Competition
- 2008 : KSAFA Super League Champions/Promoted to Digicel Premier League
