= Omar Daley =

Jamaican footballer (born 1981)

Personal information
- Full name: Omar Daley
- Date of birth: 25 April 1981 (age 45)
- Place of birth: Kingston, Jamaica
- Position: Winger

Youth career
- Central Strikers and Israel
- Value P

Senior career*
Years	Team	Apps	(Gls)
2001–2006	Portmore United	?	(?)
2003–2004	→ Reading (loan)	6	(0)
2004–2005	→ Preston North End (loan)	14	(0)
2006–2007	Charleston Battery	23	(3)
2007–2011	Bradford City	112	(14)
2011	→ Rotherham United (loan)	8	(1)
2011–2013	Motherwell	39	(3)
2013–2014	Minnesota United	23	(3)
2015	Oklahoma City Energy	8	(0)
Total		233	(24)

International career
2000–2013	Jamaica	75	(7)
- * Club domestic league appearances and goals

Omar Daley (born 25 April 1981) is a Jamaican former footballer. He played as a winger. He has also played for the Jamaica national team winning more than 50 caps. Daley was born in Kingston, Jamaica. He has played for Portmore United in his homeland, Charleston Battery, in the United States, and English side Bradford City along with loan spells at Reading, Preston North End and Rotherham United. He is known as "ratty".

== Club career ==
=== Portmore United ===
Born in Kingston, Jamaica, Daley's football career started at Glenmuir High School but was overlooked by many of the clubs in his home. He turned out for local sides Central Strikers and Israel then Value P, before he moved to newly promoted Jamaica National Premier League side Hazard United. He had a trial with Brazilian side Vasco da Gama in 2001, before he first came to England in 2002 for trials with Charlton Athletic and Everton. In August 2003, he signed a year-long loan spell with Division One side Reading after impressing on trial in a 7–0 victory over Northampton Town. He played just seven games, all as substitute, for Reading. The following season he signed another loan deal, this time with Preston North End joining Jamaican teammates Ricardo Fuller and Claude Davis. He scored in his first Preston start when they beat Mansfield Town 4–0 in the League Cup. He left Preston by mutual consent in January 2005 after 17 appearances and returned to Hazard, who had now been renamed Portmore United.

In June 2005, he helped Portmore win the Jamaica National Premier League, with a 2–1 aggregate score in the play-off final against Tivoli Gardens. The first leg finished 1–1, but Daley scored the only goal in the second leg to give his side victory.

=== Charleston Battery ===
In March 2006, Daley and compatriot Shane Crawford moved to the United States to play for Charleston Battery on a two-year contract. He was sent off in the team's United Soccer League semi-final 1–0 defeat against Rochester Rhinos and missed the second leg in which Charleston were knocked out. He played 23 times for Charleston, scoring three goals.

=== Bradford City ===
After just ten months at Charleston, Daley returned to England when he signed for Bradford City on an 18-month deal to link up with fellow Jamaican internationals Donovan Ricketts and Jermaine Johnson, becoming the fourth Jamaican to sign for City under the management of Colin Todd following central defender Damion Stewart. He made his City debut on 27 January in a 2–0 against Yeovil Town, in what proved to be Johnson's final game for City. He became Johnson's replacement and scored his first club goal in March 2007 in a 4–1 defeat at Rotherham United with a 25-yard strike. In total he scored twice in 13 games during the final months of 2006–07 season.

He became a regular under new manager Stuart McCall failing to start just one game in the first half of the 2007–08 season but he scored only one goal which came against Chester City, before he signed a new three-and-a-half-year contract in January 2008. He immediately set himself a target of eight goals for the season, before he added his second and third goals of the season within the space of a month as Bradford defeated Shrewsbury Town 4–2 and Rotherham United 3–2. He picked up the first red card of his career in England against the same opposition the following month in a 1–1 draw. Daley briefly returned to the side following his suspension, but was rested by McCall for a 2–2 draw with Brentford on 12 April 2008, when he came on as a second-half substitute, after he had received abuse from fans in the club's previous game. He again returned to the side and scored in the club's final home game of the season as they lost 2–1 to Milton Keynes Dons, finishing the season with four goals from 41 league games.

Daley helped City to the top of the table at the start of the following season, before a drop in form saw them pushed back into the play-off places. Daley himself was rested following a personal punishing regime after playing for Jamaica, but scored his first goal of the season in a 2–1 defeat to Darlington when he came on as a substitute. He scored in a second successive game four days later, as City defeated Grimsby Town 3–1, but he was substituted after just 20 minutes, after defender Matthew Clarke was sent off. A booking picked up in the game against Grimsby meant Daley was suspended a week later, but he returned to action with a goal, as City upset Milton Keynes Dons, who played league football one division higher than City, 2–1 in the FA Cup. Daley picked up another injury, this time pulling a hamstring during a 3–2 victory against Chesterfield, prompting manager McCall to bring in Steve Jones in on loan as cover. However, Daley returned after less than three weeks out, for a 2–1 defeat at Brentford. Daley was back in the team for two months before another injury, this time picked up in a game against Darlington, forced him to have an operation on his knee. It is expected to keep him out for the rest of the season and until December 2009. Daley started 27 games scoring four times during the 2008–09 season. Despite missing the last three months of the season, Daley was voted into the League Two team of the year by his peers; and without him Bradford fell out of the play-off spots and finished in ninth position.

Daley returned to training late in the year, before making his first appearance on the field on 2 December in a reserve team fixture with Oldham Athletic.

Despite undergoing two periods of surgery, rehabilitation and a number of months back in the game, Daley admitted: "I am still trying to find back my feet, I am still not at my sharpest yet, but I looking forward to the days ahead and I am just trying my best as I am still doing my rehab."

In February 2011, Daley was loaned to Bradford's League Two rivals Rotherham United, with Kevin Ellison moving in the opposite direction. He scored his first goal for Rotherham on his home debut, netting in a 2–0 win over Accrington Stanley at the Don Valley Stadium. Daley was recalled by Bradford's new manager Peter Jackson in April with five games of the season remaining. At the end of the season, he was among the players that Jackson chose to release.

=== Motherwell ===
On 23 August 2011, Daley was given a trial at Scottish Premier League side Motherwell by his former manager at Bradford City, Stuart McCall. A week later, Daley received a work permit, allowing him to sign for Motherwell on a two-year contract, which was formally announced on 12 September 2011. He scored his first goal for Motherwell on 19 November 2011 to give his side a 2–1 victory against Aberdeen. After making 39 appearances for the North Lanarkshire-based club, mostly as a substitute, Daley was released by the club on 20 May 2013.

=== Minnesota United ===
In August 2013, Daley joined NASL side Minnesota United FC. During the 2013 NASL Fall Championship, Daley appeared in five games, recording three goals and an assist in 232 minutes. His hat trick in the final game of the 2013 season was the first hat trick by a Minnesota player since 2007.

== International career ==
Daley appeared for the Jamaican under 20s in the 2001 FIFA World Youth Championship in Argentina, where they went out in the first round after losing two of their three group games. He was first called up to the Jamaica national team for a tour of the Cayman Islands and also impressed in a game against the national side for a Clarendon All Star XI team. He has been capped more than 50 times and scored five international goals.

Three of his goals came in successive games in 2003 including CONCACAF Gold Cup qualifying victories against St Lucia and Haiti. He was sent off in a 2005 CONCACAF Gold Cup game against Mexico in the 70th minute for a second bookable offence. He played in Jamaica's 6–0 friendly defeat to England in the run up to the 2006 World Cup. Peter Crouch scored a hat-trick for England in the game, with his first goal taking a deflection off Daley. He scored a 22nd-minute goal in a 2–0 win against Guatemala on 21 November 2007. Three days later he was dropped from the Bradford City starting team for the first time in the 2007–08 English league season, after he and Jamaican teammate Donovan Ricketts had to be picked up by club chairman Mark Lawn when their flight back was delayed. Bradford drew the game with Stockport County 1–1 with Daley coming on as a second-half substitute.

Because of his knee injury, Daley went 19 months between two caps, from February 2009 when he played against Nigeria in London to September 2010 when he substituted Kavin Bryan against Costa Rica.

Daley was unavailable for Jamaica for a period of time to concentrate on his career with Bradford City, but he was selected in the 2011 CONCACAF Gold Cup squad. He scored in Jamaica's first group game netting the final goal in a 4–0 win against Grenada.

=== International goals ===
#	Date	Venue	Opponent	Score	Result	Competition	Notes
1	23 March 2003	National Stadium, Kingston, Jamaica	Barbados	2–1	2–1	Friendly	
2	26 March 2003	National Stadium, Kingston, Jamaica	Saint Lucia	5–0	5–0	2003 CONCACAF Gold Cup qualification	
3	28 March 2003	National Stadium, Kingston, Jamaica	Martinique	1–2	2–2	2003 CONCACAF Gold Cup qualification	
4	30 March 2003	National Stadium, Kingston, Jamaica	Haiti	2–0	3–0	2003 CONCACAF Gold Cup qualification	
5	21 November 2007	National Stadium, Kingston, Jamaica	Guatemala	2–0	2–0	Friendly	
6	15 June 2008	National Stadium, Kingston, Jamaica	Bahamas	7–0	7–0	2010 FIFA World Cup qualification	
7	6 June 2011	The Home Depot Center, Carson, USA	Grenada	4–0	4–0	2011 CONCACAF Gold Cup	

== Style of play ==
Daley can play on either right wing or left wing, the latter of which enables him to cut inside to shoot out on his right foot. He has also been used as a striker, and played as right back for his country. He has also divided opinion among fans, some of whom are disappointed by his work rate or expect too much magic.

== Personal life ==
Daley's younger brother, Keammar, is also a footballer, playing as a forward for Waterhouse FC.

== Career statistics ==
As of 19 May 2013

Club	Season	League		Cup		League Cup		Other		Total	
Club	Season	Apps	Goals	Apps	Goals	Apps	Goals	Apps	Goals	Apps	Goals
Portmore United	2003–04	0	0	0	0	0	0	0	0	0	0
Reading (loan)	2003–04	6	0	0	0	1	0	0	0	7	0
Preston North End (loan)	2004–05	14	0	0	0	3	1	0	0	17	1
Charleston Battery	2006–07	23	0	0	0	0	0	0	0	23	0
Bradford City	2006–07	14	2	0	0	0	0	0	0	14	2
Bradford City	2007–08	41	4	2	0	1	0	0	0	44	4
Bradford City	2008–09	28	3	1	1	1	0	1	0	31	4
Bradford City	2009–10	14	1	0	0	0	0	1	0	15	1
Bradford City	2010–11	9	3	0	0	2	0	1	0	12	3
Bradford City	Total	106	13	3	1	4	0	3	0	116	14
Rotherham United (loan)	2010–11	8	1	0	0	0	0	0	0	8	1
Motherwell	2011–12	25	2	1	1	1	0	0	0	27	3
Motherwell	2012–13	14	1	0	0	1	0	2	0	17	1
Motherwell	Total	39	3	1	1	2	0	2	0	44	4
Career totals		195	17	4	2	10	1	5	0	214	20

== Honours ==
Portmore United

- Jamaica National Premier League: 2004–05

Individual

- PFA Team of the Year: 2008–09 Football League Two
