= Mitchily Waul =

Jamaican footballer (born 1985)

Personal information
- Full name: Mitchily Augustus Waul
- Date of birth: 13 September 1985 (age 41)
- Place of birth: Kingston, Jamaica
- Height: 1.79 m (5 ft 10 in)
- Position: Midfielder

Senior career*
Years	Team	Apps	(Gls)
2007–2008	August Town		
2008–2009	Harbour View		
2011–2012	Tivoli Gardens	32	(5)
2012–2013	Cavalier	17	(1)
2013	Charlotte Eagles	8	(0)
2013–2014	Portmore United	12	(0)
2014–2016	Boys' Town	23	(0)
2016–2019	Tivoli Gardens	28	(3)
- Liguanea United
Total		120+	(9+)

International career
2012	Jamaica	3	(1)
- * Club domestic league appearances and goals

Mitchily Augusts Waul (born 13 September 1985) is a Jamaican football coach and former player who played as a midfielder.

== Career ==
Born in Kingston, Waul played club football for August Town, Harbour View, Tivoli Gardens, Cavalier, the Charlotte Eagles, Portmore United and Boys' Town.

He made his international debut for Jamaica in 2012, scoring one goal in three appearances.

After retiring he became a coach, managing Liguanea United, where he served as player-coach, and later coaching at Ballaz Academy.
