= Dennis Ziadie =

Jamaican footballer (1946–1986)

Personal information
- Full name: Dennis Patrick Ziadie
- Date of birth: 1 October 1946
- Place of birth: Saint James, Jamaica
- Date of death: 24 June 1986 (aged 39)
- Place of death: Guadalajara, Mexico
- Position: Striker

Senior career*
Years	Team	Apps	(Gls)
1968	Boston Beacons	3	(0)

International career
- Jamaica

Managerial career
- Jamaica U20
- * Club domestic league appearances and goals

Dennis Patrick Ziadie (1 October 1946 – 24 June 1986) was a Jamaican footballer who played in the NASL with the Boston Beacons in 1968, as well as the Jamaican national side. He is the father of fellow players Chris Ziadie, Nick Ziadie and Craig Ziadie.

Ziadie and fellow coach Winthorpe "Jackie" Bell were killed in a car accident in Guadalajara, Mexico, during the 1986 FIFA World Cup. An annual memorial football match is held in Florida in Ziadie's memory.
