= Football in Jamaica =

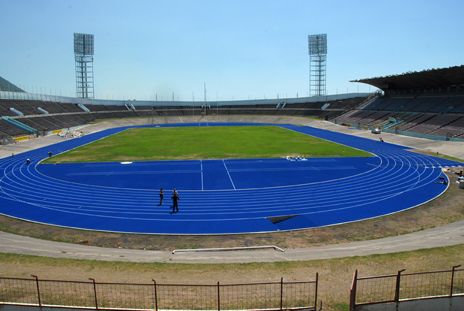
- Independence Park, the national stadium of Jamaica
- Country: Jamaica
- Governing body: Jamaica Football Federation
- National teams: Men's national team; Women's national team
- Nicknames: Reggae Boyz; Reggae Girlz
- First played: at least 1862 (men); at least 1895 (women)

National competitions
- FIFA World Cup (m); FIFA Women's World Cup (w); CONCACAF Gold Cup (m); CONCACAF W Championship (w); CONCACAF W Gold Cup (w); CONCACAF Nations League (m); Copa América (m); CFU Caribbean Cup (m); CFU Women's Caribbean Cup (w); Olympic Games (w); Pan American Games (w); Central American and Caribbean Games (w)

Club competitions
- National Premier League (m); JFF Champions Cup (m); KSAFA Super League (m); South Central Confederation Super League (m); Eastern Confederation Super League (m); Western Confederation Super League (m)

International competitions
- FIFA Club World Cup (m); CONCACAF Champions Cup (m); CONCACAF W Champions Cup (w); CONCACAF Caribbean Cup (m); CFU Caribbean Club Shield (m)

Football is one of the most popular sports in Jamaica. It is enjoyed by Jamaicans from all walks of life and has grown in popularity in modern society. Approximately 65% of the Jamaicans are interested in football.

== Early history ==
In 1893, the Kingston Cricket Club, which was founded in 1863 by the elite of the colonial society, founded the first football team. Two years later, nationwide newspapers report about women's football for the first time.

Between 1925 and 1932, a Jamaican men's national team was formed and played a number of friendlies, mostly against neighbors Haiti. These matches were usually played at Sabina Park, the main cricket ground of the island. In the following years, female football clubs started to form in Kingston, playing a first match in the same stadium in November 1935 to raise funds for charities. In the coming years, women's football started to outgrow men's football on the island and reached the cities of Spanish Town, Montego Bay, Port Antonio and Saint Ann's Bay, attracting more fans than the men did and igniting public debates about the need for a nationwide league for women. Starting from the 1940s, there is no further reporting on women's football.

It is unknown if men played football at that time on the island, but by 1952 a Jamaican men's representative team again played internationally, organising an entire series against a Caribbean All Stars team.

Under the leadership of Jorge Penna Jamaica did participate in a men's FIFA World Cup qualification campaign for the first time in 1965, failing to qualify for the 1966 edition by losing to Mexico and Costa Rica in the final stage.

== Football governance ==
The Jamaica Football Federation (JFF) is the governing body of football in Jamaica. It was formed in 1910 and governs men's football since then and women's football since 1991. Between 1987 and 1991, women's football was governed by the Jamaican Women's Football Federation.

The JFF joined CONCACAF and FIFA in 1962.

== League system ==
There is currently no women's league in Jamaica. For the men's league system, see Jamaican football league system.

== Cup system ==
There is currently no women's cup tournament in Jamaica. For the men's cup, see JFF Champions Cup.

== Men's National team ==
One of the major successes of the Jamaica men's national team came when the team qualified for the 1998 FIFA World Cup in France. They did not progress beyond the first round, but managed to win their final group match against Japan, winning 2–1. They have also won the Caribbean Cup on five occasions.

== Women's national team ==
One of the major successes of the Jamaica women's national team came when the team qualified for the 2019 FIFA Women's World Cup in France. They lost all their group matches, but Havana Solaun managed to score a first ever World Cup goal for the team in their final group match against Australia. They have participate in 7 CONCACAF W Championships, winning the bronze medal in 2018 and 2022. They also finished runners up in the second CFU Women's Caribbean Cup in 2014.

== Football stadiums ==
Rank	Stadium	Location	Capacity	Tenants	Image
1	Independence Park	Kingston	35,000	Jamaica national football team	
2	Trelawny Stadium	Trelawny	25,000		
3	Sabina Park	Kingston	15,600		
4	Harbour View Stadium	Kingston	7,000	Harbour View FC	
5	Railway Oval	Kingston	5,000		

== Attendances ==
The average attendance per top-flight football league season and the club with the highest average attendance:

Season	League average	Best club	Best club average
2024-25	169	Mount Pleasant	242

Source: League page on Wikipedia
