= Holger Obermann =

German footballer and journalist (1936–2021)

Personal information
- Date of birth: 31 August 1936
- Place of birth: Kassel, Germany
- Date of death: 30 October 2021 (aged 85)
- Place of death: Friedrichsdorf, Germany
- Position: Goalkeeper

Senior career*
Years	Team	Apps	(Gls)
- Concordia Hamburg
- Elizabeth S.C.

Managerial career
- 2003: Afghanistan
- * Club domestic league appearances and goals

Holger Obermann (31 August 1936 – 30 October 2021) was a German professional footballer, football manager, journalist and ARD television reporter.

== Career ==
Obermann was born in Kassel. He first started playing for KSV Hessen Kassel. He continued his career at Concordia Hamburg and FSV Frankfurt. In 1961, he went to the United States, where he was the first German professional. He played in New York City at Elizabeth S.C. the 1st German-American Soccer League.

His journalistic career began with an internship at the Hamburger Morgenpost. Later, he was an editor and foreign correspondent for the New Yorker Staats-Zeitung, head of a German radio station and staff of the American television network ABC in Miami. After his return to Germany in 1966, he was a senior editor at TV the Hessischer Rundfunk, later head of the editorial Television Sports currently at South German Radio. Here he commented on football games for ARD.

From 1971 to 1984, he was one of the moderators of the sports program Sportschau.

Obermann was involved for many years in the sport-related development assistance in crisis areas. His work as a "sports development expert" led him on behalf of the German Football Association and the National Olympic Committees around 30 locations, including East Timor, Cameroon, Nepal, Bangladesh, Sri Lanka and Afghanistan. Several times he was honored for his commitment. In 1997, he was awarded the Federal Cross of Merit and 2004, the prize for tolerance and fair play of the Federal Ministry of the Interior, Building and Community.

Obermann was a senior adviser of the Afghanistan football project sponsored by FIFA. From January until March 2003, he led the Afghanistan national football team. From March 2004, he was an honorary member of the Afghan Football Association for his contributions to youth development. After the Indian Ocean tsunami of 2004, he was named by FIFA as technical consultant for the reconstruction program in Sri Lanka, where he worked directly on site.

Obermann helped to found the German American Society of Hollywood Florida in 1964.

== Personal life and death ==
Obermann married to Barbara in 1961. They had two children. He died from COVID-19 in Friedrichsdorf on 30 October 2021, during the COVID-19 pandemic in Germany.

== Writings ==
- Obermann, Holger (1975). Rot-Weiss vor, noch ein Tor (in German). Stuttgart: Thienemann. ISBN 3-522-12280-1. OCLC 74264256.
- —— (1989). Und alle träumen von Pele : meine Erlebnisse am Gambia-River (in German). Stuttgart-Botnang: Consens-Verlag H. Hirschel. ISBN 978-3-926729-06-4. OCLC 29617532.
- —— (2015). Mein Fußball hatte Flügel : Erlebnisse von New York bis Kabul (in German). Wehrheim: Balog. ISBN 978-3-95586-001-1. OCLC 905354078.

== Awards ==
- 1997 Officer's Cross of the Order of Merit of the Federal Republic of Germany
- 2004 Clasp of Merit from the German Football Association (DFB)
- 2004 Fair Play Prize (BMI-Preis für Toleranz und Fair Play im Sport)
- 2010 FIFA Order of Merit
- 2013 German Football Ambassador
