= Santos F.C. (Jamaica) =

Jamaican association football club

- Full name: Santos Football Club
- Founded: 1964; 62 years ago
- Ground: Bell/Chung oval Kingston, Jamaica
- Capacity: Unknown
- League: KSAFA Super League
- 2023–24: 8th
Home colours

Santos Football Club is a Jamaican professional football club that competes in the KSAFA Super League.

The team is based in Kingston, Jamaica.

== History ==
Founded on 16 April 1964, by former Jamaica national team coach Winston Chung Fah, the name and symbol of the team are a tribute to Pelé's Santos FC of Brazil. Also, the team colors are in honor of the Brazil national team.

The team has won the Jamaica National Premier League on 5 separate occasions: in the 1973–74, 1974–75, 1975–76, 1976–77 and 1979–80 seasons.
