= Teafore Bennett =

Jamaican footballer (born 1984)

Personal information
- Full name: Teafore Bennett
- Date of birth: 7 June 1984 (age 42)
- Place of birth: Duncans, Jamaica
- Height: 1.76 m (5 ft 9 1/2 in)
- Position: Striker

Team information
- Current team: August Town F.C.

Senior career*
Years	Team	Apps	(Gls)
2002–2004	Village United F.C.		(0)
2004–2005	Portmore United F.C.		(6)
2005	Banfield		(?)
2005	Virginia Beach Mariners	14	(1)
2005–2006	Pahang FA		(12)
2005–2006	Village United F.C.		(2)
2006	Harrisburg City Islanders	9	(1)
2006–2007	Östers IF	43	(5)
2008	Petro Atlético	30	(5)
2009	Village United F.C.	5	(1)
2010	August Town F.C.	7	(0)
2010–	Village United F.C.	2	(0)

International career^{‡}
2004–2006	Jamaica	20	(4)
- * Club domestic league appearances and goals as of 14 December 2007 ‡ National team caps and goals as of 14 December 2007

Teafore Bennett (born 7 June 1984) is a Jamaican football striker who currently plays for Village United F.C.

He is known for his speed and running ability.

== Club career ==
He has played for several clubs, including Village United F.C. and Portmore United F.C. in Jamaica, Virginia Beach Mariners and Harrisburg City Islanders in the US, Banfield in Argentina and Pahang FA in Malaysia.

He was signed by Harrisburg City Islanders six days after he scored against United States on 11 April 2006.

In December 2007, he became the first Jamaican to sign for an African club, Petro Atlético from Angola.

He returned to Jamaica after the 2008 season. On his return, he turned out once again for Village United F.C.

== International career ==
He made his debut for the Reggae Boyz in an October 2004 friendly match against Guatemala and has earned 20 caps, scoring 4 goals. His last international match was a November 2006 friendly against Peru.
