= Jackie Bell (football manager) =

Jamaican football manager (??–1986)

Personal information
- Full name: Winthorpe Bell
- Place of birth: Jamaica

Managerial career
- Years: Team
- Jamaica

Winthorpe Bell (died 1986) was a Jamaican football manager, in honor of whom the KSAFA Jackie Bell Knockout Competition was named.

== Early life ==
Bell attended St. George's College in Jamaica.

== Career ==
Bell managed the Jamaica national football team.

== Personal life ==
Bell was married.

== Death ==
Both Dennis Ziadie and Jackie traveled to the 1986 World Cup in Mexico in order to improve a badly faltering national program to help see Jamaica qualify for the World Cup.

After watching the Brazil vs. France quarterfinal matchup, Bell, Ziadie, and fellow accomplice Carl Chang were supposed to fly back to their hotel in another town, but they had learned all the flights were booked, so the decision was made to take a bus back to the hotel.

According to Ziadie's son Nick, "Apparently, there were only three seats left on the bus - two in the front and one in the back - and because Jackie and my dad were so close, (Chang) probably figured they wanted to talk about the game, so he let the two of them sit together at the front."

When the accident occurred, Ziadie was thrown from the bus and immediately died on impact, while Bell had originally survived the crash but later succumbed to his injuries at the hospital.
