= René Hüssy =

Swiss footballer and manager (1928-2007)

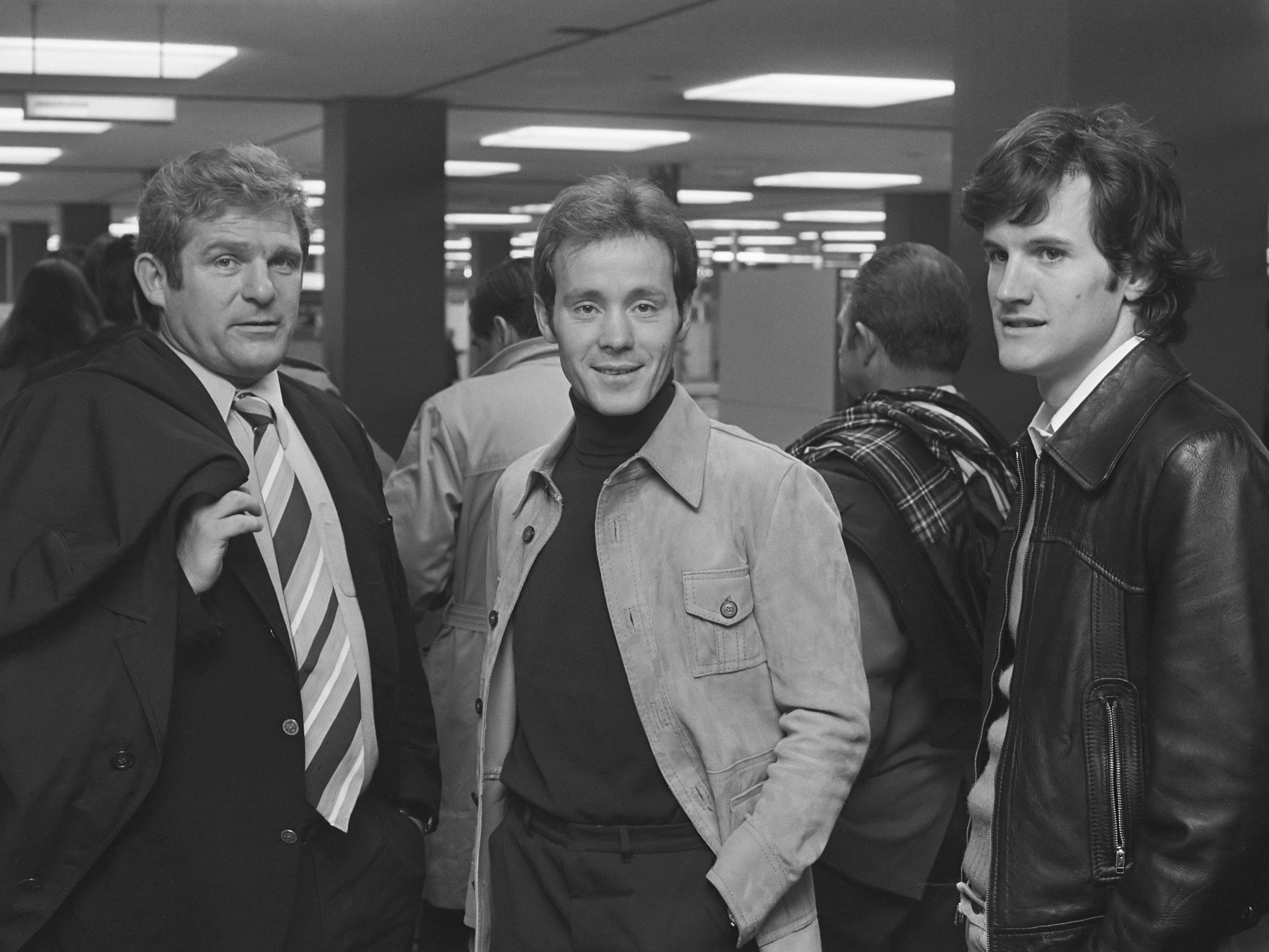
- René Hussy, Köbi Kuhn and Daniel Jeandupeux (1974).jpg

Personal information
- Date of birth: 19 October 1928
- Place of birth: Zürich, Switzerland
- Date of death: 11 March 2007 (aged 78)
- Position: Defender

Youth career
- –1947: Grasshopper Club Zürich

Senior career*
Years	Team	Apps	(Gls)
1947–1949	Grasshopper Club Zürich		
1949–1951	FC Lausanne-Sport		
1951–1961	Grasshopper Club Zürich		

Managerial career
- 1963–1970: FC Winterthur
- 1970: Switzerland
- 1970–1973: Grasshopper Club Zürich
- 1973–1976: Switzerland
- 1976–1977: FC Luzern
- 1977–1978: BSC Young Boys
- * Club domestic league appearances and goals

René Hüssy (born 29 August 1928 in Zürich, died 11 March 2007) was a Swiss football player and manager who played for Grasshopper Club Zürich and FC Lausanne-Sport and managed the Switzerland national football team.

== Playing career ==
Hüssy began his professional playing career with Grasshopper Club Zürich in 1947 and won three Swiss titles and three Swiss cups during his time with Grasshoppers and Lausanne Sports.

== Managerial career ==
Hüssy was the manager of FC Winterthur for eight years and Grasshopper Club Zürich for three years. He also coached the Switzerland national football team in 1970 and again from 1973 to 1976, FC Luzern and BSC Young Boys.

== Honours ==
FIFA president Sepp Blatter presented Hüssy with the FIFA Order of Merit in recognition of his life's work on 28 May 2002.
