= Syd Bartlett =

Jamaican footballer

Personal information
- Full name: Sydney Bartlett
- Date of birth: 1938 or 1939
- Place of birth: Kingston, Jamaica
- Date of death: 19 December 2009 (aged 70)
- Place of death: New York City, U.S.
- Position: Forward

Senior career*
Years	Team	Apps	(Gls)
1967–1970	New York Generals	3	(0)

International career
1959–1965	Jamaica		
- * Club domestic league appearances and goals

Sydney Bartlett (1938/1939 – 19 December 2009) was a Jamaican footballer who played at both professional and international levels as a forward.

== Career ==
Bartlett spent one season with the New York Generals of the NPSL, making three appearances.

He also spent time with the Jamaican national side, appearing in two FIFA World Cup qualifying matches.

== Later life and death ==
Bartlett died in a New York hospital on 19 December 2009, at the age of 70. The KSAFA Syd Bartlett League was named in his honour.
