= Fernando Alvarez (footballer, born 1925) =

Filipino-American footballer, sports executive and referee

- Born: Fernando Giménez Alvarez; October 15, 1925; Manila, Philippine Islands
- Died: February 16, 2013 (aged 87); United States
Association football career
Senior career*
Years	Team	Apps	(Gls)
1947–?	Turbo Salvajes		
International career
–	Philippines		
Managerial career
- 1962: Philippines
Refereeing career
International
Years	League	Role
1959–1973	FIFA listed	Referee
- * Club domestic league appearances and goals

Fernando "Nando" Giménez Alvarez (October 15, 1925 – February 16, 2013) was a Filipino association footballer, sports executive and referee. He is known for introducing the substitution signal, a gesture used by FIFA referees whenever a player enters and leaves a pitch during international football matches.

== Early life ==
Fernando Giménez Alvarez was born on October 15, 1925 to Fernando García Alvarez Sr. and Adelina Acosta Giménez who were both Spanish immigrants in the Philippines. He had seven siblings although he and a brother were the only ones to live up to adulthood.

Alvarez attended De La Salle College where he spent most of his studies and transferred to San Beda College shortly prior to the outbreak of World War II. After the war, he finished his studies at the University of the East.

== Military service ==
During World War II he joined the Hukbalahap, a resistance group which fought against the Imperial Japanese occupiers. He also later served in the United States Army which later lead to him being given United States citizenship. He was part of the United States Merchant Marine until 1947 when he was honorably discharged from the organization.

== Football career ==
=== As a player ===
As a student, Alvarez played for San Beda College. He was also the captain of the Philippines national football team.

At the club level, he was a mainstay of the Turbo Salvajes of the Manila Football League in the late 1940s which won four of the first five league titles since the league's resumption in 1947.

=== As coach ===
Alvarez was the head coach of the Philippines which finished last in the 1962 Asian Games.

=== As a referee ===
Alvarez was given FIFA referee status in 1958 and officiated 32 international matches held from 1959 to 1973. From 1966 to 1988, Alvarez was a member of the Asian Football Confederation Referees Committee. As part of the FIFA International Board of Referees, he was the one who came up with substitution signal which is used by referees whenever a player leaves or enters the field in international matches.

Alvarez is credited for increasing the profile of American soccer referees. In the 1990s, the inclusion of Esse Baharmast as one of the referees of the 1998 FIFA World Cup in France was a result of Alvarez's intervention. He wrote to FIFA President Joao Havelange where he vouched for Baharmast's capability to officiate in a world cup.

From 1990 to 2009, Alvarez worked as a referee for Cal North, a youth soccer organization in Northern California. Under Cal North, he served as the mentor of various American referees including Kari Seitz who has officiated matches in the FIFA Women's World Cup and the Olympics.

He was also involved in the referee program of the United States Soccer Federation (USSF) helping the association set up a referee exchange program with other national-level federations. For twelve years under the United States association, he served as a member of the FIFA Referees Committee

=== As a sports executive ===
Alvarez also held executive positions not specific to refereeing. From 1978 to 1988, he was a Vice President of the Asian Football Federation. At the national-level, he held the post of General Secretary of the Philippine Football Federation in the 1960s and 1970s.

== Honors ==
He received recognition for his contributions to association football. He was conferred with the FIFA Order of Merit in 2005 by then USSF President S. Robert Contiguglia with the Philippine Football Federation nominating him for the distinction.

In 1973, FIFA conferred him a Special Referee Award in 1973, and was the only Asian referee to be given the distinction. The Asian Football Confederation has also given him the AFC Distinguished Service Award and the Philippine Football Federation awarded him a special award under the "International Achievements" category in 2004.

== Personal life ==
Alvarez was married to María Lourdes Rotaeche. They got married on June 30, 1951 and had four children. In 1990, after most of their children have moved to San Francisco, the couple migrated to the United States to join their children in California. Alvarez died on February 16, 2013 shortly after the death of his wife in late 2012.
