= Damion Williams =

Jamaican footballer (born 1981)

Personal information
- Date of birth: 26 February 1981 (age 45)
- Place of birth: Jamaica
- Position: Midfielder

Team information
- Current team: Nybergsund

Senior career*
Years	Team	Apps	(Gls)
1999–2003	Waterhouse		
2003–2004	Portmore United		
2004–2005	Constant Spring		
2005–2008	Waterhouse		
2008–2009	Portmore United		
2009–2011	Nybergsund	34	(1)
2012–	Portmore United		

International career^{‡}
2001–2013	Jamaica	22	(0)
- * Club domestic league appearances and goals as of 21 April 2011 ‡ National team caps and goals as of 11 June 2013

Damion Williams (born 26 February 1981) is a Jamaican international footballer who plays for Portmore United, as a midfielder.

== Career ==
=== Club career ===
Williams has played for Waterhouse, Portmore United and Constant Spring, before moving to current club Nybergsund in 2009. In 2012, Williams returned to Portmore United.

=== International career ===
Williams appeared at the 2001 FIFA World Youth Championship, and made his international debut for Jamaica that same year.

== Charity / Youth Soccer Development ==
In the Summer of 2012, Williams acted as a guest coach/counselor at the Youth Soccer Summer Camp of Brooklyn Athletics.
