= Eastern Confederation Super League =

- Country: Jamaica
- Confederation: CONCACAF
- Number of clubs: 10
- Level on pyramid: 3
- Promotion to: JFF National Tier II

The Eastern Confederation Super League is a second division football league in the nation of Jamaica. The ten teams that currently compete in the league are based in the parishes of Portland, St. Ann, St. Mary and St. Thomas.

At the end of each season the winners qualify for the National Premier League Playoff along with the winners of the KSAFA Super League, South Central Confederation Super League and Western Confederation Super League.

These four teams play each other, home and away, with the top two teams from this playoff being promoted to the Jamaica National Premier League.

For the 2012 season the confederation was abolished, with all teams reverting to their respective parish leagues

== Member teams 2009-10 ==
- Albion Mountain F.C. (St Mary)
- Bath F.C. (St Thomas)
- Benfica F.C. (St Ann)
- Brazil F.C. (St Ann)
- Manchioneal F.C. (Portland)
- Port Morant F.C. (St Thomas)
- Rising Star F.C. (St Ann)
- St. Ann Bauxite F.C. (St Ann)
- Star Cosmos F.C. (St Mary)
- York Sports Club (St Thomas)
