= Maverley Hughenden F.C. =

Jamaican football club

Maverley Hughenden F.C. is a Jamaican football team based in Kingston.

== History ==
Maverley Hughenden F.C. were crowned champions of 2015–16 KSAFA Super League season. This qualified for the National Premier Playoff where they gained promotion to the Jamaica Premier League off one point.

In the 2016–17 season, Maverley were one point off staying in the National Premier League, as a result they were sent back down to the KSAFA Super League.

== Honours ==
- KSAFA Super League: 2015–16
