= KSAFA Super League =

KSAFA Championship
- Country: Jamaica
- Confederation: CONCACAF
- Number of clubs: 12
- Level on pyramid: 3
- Promotion to: JFF Championship
- Relegation to: KSAFA Major League
- Domestic cup: KSAFA Jackie Bell Knockout Competition
- Current champions: Real Mona
- Website: www.ksafa.net/Superl.htm

The KSAFA Championship (formerly KSAFA Super League), also known as the Wray & Nephew KSAFA Championship for sponsorship purposes, is a men's third division football league sanctioned by the Jamaican Football Federation. The league is contested between 12 clubs that are based in the parishes of St. Andrew and Kingston, it operates on a system of promotion and relegation whereas at the end of each season the two finalists are promoted to JFF National Tier II, and the lowest placed teams are relegated to KSAFA Major League.

== Competition format ==
The league consists of a preliminary round consisting of 12 teams in a league table format, playing each other team twice, at home and away.

At the end of the preliminary round, the top four teams advance to semifinals knock-out round.

The winner will be allowed to participate in the JFF National Tier II competition should they wish to do so for a chance to earn promotion to the Jamaica Premier League.

== Clubs ==
=== Member teams 2023–24 ===
- Barbican F.C.
- Boys' Town F.C.
- Brown's Town F.C.
- Central Kingston
- Constant Spring F.C.
- Liguanea United F.C.
- JDF F.C.
- Mavarley Hughenden F.C.
- Olympic Gardens F.C.
- Real Mona F.C.
- Santos F.C.
- Shortwood F.C.

=== Member teams 2010-11 ===
- August Town F.C.
- Barbican F.C.
- Bull Bay F.C.
- Cavalier S.C.
- Constant Spring F.C.
- Duhaney Park F.C.
- Mountain View United F.C.
- Rae Town F.C.
- Real Mona F.C.
- Rockfort F.C.
- Santos F.C.
- UWI
- Jamaica Defence Force Will not play due to domestic military duties.

=== Member teams 2018-19 ===
- Barbican F.C.
- Browns Town F.C.
- Central Kingston F.C.
- Maverly/Hughenden F.C.
- Maxfield Park F.C.
- Molynes United F.C.
- Mountain View F.C.
- Pembroke Hall F.C.
- Rae Town F.C
- Real Mona F.C.
- Rockfort F.C.
- Santos F.C.

== Past Champions ==
- 2018: Molynes United
- 2017: Cavalier S.C.
- 2016: Maverley Hughenden
- 2015: UWI F.C.
- 2014: Barbican F.C.
- 2013: August Town F.C.
- 2012: Cavalier S.C.
- 2011: Cavalier S.C.
- 2010: Pembroke Hall F.C
- 2009: August Town F.C.
- 2008: Meadhaven United F.C.
- 2007: Police Nationals F.C.
- 2006: August Town F.C.
- 2005: Boys' Town F.C.
- 2004: Santos F.C.
