= Barbican F.C. =

Jamaican football club

- Full name: Barbican United Football Club
- Ground: Barbican Stadium
- Capacity: 2,000
- League: KSAFA Championship
Home colours	Away colours

Barbican United F.C., commonly referred to as Barbican F.C. or Barbican is a professional football club based in Kingston. The club competes in the KSAFA Championship, the third tier of Jamaican football. The team plays its home matches at the Barbican Sports Complex in Kingston.

== Honors ==
- KSAFA Jackie Bell Knockout Competition
  - Runners-up: 2014-15
