= Constant Spring F.C. =

Jamaican football club

- Full name: Constant Spring Football Club
- Nickname: Spring
- Founded: 1955 (as Golden Aces)
- Ground: Constant Spring Sports Ground, Constant Spring, Jamaica
- Capacity: 2,500
- Owner: Danny Lyn
- League: KSAFA Super League
- 2017–18: KSAFA Major League, 1st
Home colours

is a Jamaican football club, which currently plays in the third tier KSAFA Super League. The team is based in Constant Spring, St Andrew, which may be regarded as suburb of the capital Kingston. They play their home games at Constant Spring Sports Ground.

The club was founded in the mid 20th century under the name "Golden Aces".

The team last played in the Premier League in the 2005–06 season.

== Achievements ==
- Jamaica Premier League

- Runners-up(1): 1994–95

- National A League (Currently KSAFA Championship)

- Champions(1): 1999–00

- KSAFA Major League

- Champions(4): 1987–88, 1990–91, 1992–93, 2017–18

- Jackie Bell Knockout Competition

- Winners(2): 1987–88, 1999–00
- Runners-up(1): 2000–01

== Year-by-year ==
Year	Division	League	Regular season	JFF Champions Cup	Jackie Bell KO
1999/00	2	National A League	Champions	Semifinal	Winners
2000/01	1	National Premier League			Final
2001/02	1	National Premier League	7th	Quarterfinal	Quarterfinal
2002/03	1	National Premier League	9th		
2003/04	1	National Premier League	8th		
2004/05	1	National Premier League	10th		
2005/06	1	National Premier League	11th	2nd Round	Semifinal
2006/07	2	KSAFA Super League	8th		2nd Round
2007/08	2	KSAFA Super League	8th		
2008/09	2	KSAFA Super League	6th		5th Round
2009/10	2	KSAFA Super League	6th		Quarterfinal
2010/11	2	KSAFA Super League	8th		1st Round
2011/12	2	KSAFA Super League	11th	1st Round	1st Round
2012/13	3	KSAFA Major League	3rd		2nd Round
2013/14		Suspended	N/A	N/A	N/A
2014/15	3	KSAFA Major League	4th		1st Round
2015/16	3	KSAFA Major League			2nd Round
2016/17	3	KSAFA Major League			
2017/18	3	KSAFA Major League	1st		
2018/19	2	KSAFA Super League	TBD		

== Rivalries ==
The nearest clubs to Constant Spring are Shortwood United, Barbican and Stony Hill.

Spring's fiercest rivalry is with Shortwood United, both clubs only being separated by roughly 1,000 yards. Spring have been the bigger of the two teams over the years but after being relegated to the Major League in the 2011/2012 season from the Super League, Shortwood were promoted the other way.
