= KSAFA Major League =

- Country: Jamaica
- Confederation: CONCACAF
- Number of clubs: 12
- Level on pyramid: 4
- Promotion to: KSAFA Championship
- Relegation to: KSAFA Syd Bartlett League
- Domestic cup: KSAFA Jackie Bell Knockout Competition
- Website: http://www.ksafa.net/Major.htm

The KSAFA Major League, officially known as Wray & Nephew KSAFA Major League for sponsorship reasons, is a fourth-division football league in Jamaica. The twelve teams that compete in the league are based in the parishes of St. Andrew and Kingston. At the end of each season, the two finalists are promoted to the KSAFA Championship. The bottom two teams are relegated to the KSAFA Syd Bartlett League.

== Competition format ==
The competition is composed of a preliminary round consisting of two zone, with 6 teams per zone.

At the end of the preliminary round the top four teams from each zone will advance to the quarter-finals knock-out rounds.

The winners and runners-up gain promotion to the KSAFA Championship, while the bottom placed team of each preliminary zones are relegated to the KSAFA Syd Bartlett League.

== Clubs ==
=== Member teams 2023–24 ===
- Allman Woodford F.C.
- August Town F.C.
- Bull Bay F.C.
- Cooreville Gardens F.C.
- Duhaney Park F.C.
- Maxfield Park F.C.
- New Kingston F.C.
- Pembroke Hall F.C.
- Police Nation F.C.
- Red Hills F.C.
- Rockfort F.C.
- Seaview Gardens F.C.

=== Member teams 2008–2009 ===
- Barbican F.C.
- Brown's Town F.C.
- Central Kingston F.C.
- Cooreville Gardens F.C.
- Meadforest F.C.
- Molynes United F.C.
- Olympic Gardens F.C.
- Port Royal F.C.
- Rae Town F.C.
- Rockfort F.C.
- Seaview Gardens F.C.
- Swallowfield F.C.
