= Maurice Burlaz Trophy =

The Maurice Burlaz Trophy is an association football prize that is awarded to the national association that has achieved the best results in UEFA's men's youth competitions over the previous two seasons. The trophy is named after Maurice Burlaz, former vice-chairman of the UEFA Youth Committee.

== Winners ==
Year	Winner
1990	Portugal
1992	Germany
1994	Spain, Portugal, Turkey
1996	Spain
1998	Spain
2000	Portugal
2002	Spain
2004	Spain
2006	Spain
2007	Spain
2009	Germany
2011	Spain
2013	France
2015	Germany
2017	England

== Most Wins ==
- Spain - 8× (1 shared)
- Germany - 3×
- Portugal - 3× (1 shared)
- England - 1×
- France - 1×
- Turkey - 1× (1 shared)
