= Olympic Gardens F.C. =

Jamaican football club

Olympic Gardens Football Club is a Jamaican football club based in Kingston. The men's team won the KSAFA Major League in the 2018–19 season.

The club also runs a youth department, and a women's team.

== Honors ==
=== Domestic ===
- KSAFA Major League
  - Champions (1): 2018–19
- KSAFA Jackie Bell Knockout Competition
  - Winners (1): 1997–98
  - Runners-up: 1990–91
