= Real Mona F.C. =

Jamaican football club

- Full name: Real Mona Football Club
- Short name: Real Mona
- Founded: 1966
- Ground: Buttercup Park
- League: KSAFA Championship

Real Mona Football Club is a professional football club based in Mona, Jamaica. They currently that competes in KSAFA Championship, the third tier of Jamaican football. Founded in 1966, the team plays its home matches at the Butter cup park in Mona.
