= KSAFA Syd Bartlett League =

The KSAFA Syd Bartlett League is a fifth division football league in the nation of Jamaica. The eleven teams that currently compete in the league are based in the parishes of St. Andrew and Kingston.

At the end of each season the top two teams are promoted to the KSAFA Major League.

The league is named in honour of Syd Bartlett.
