= Shane Crawford (Jamaican footballer) =

Jamaican football player (born 1979)

Personal information
- Date of birth: 16 November 1979 (age 46)
- Place of birth: Falmouth, Jamaica
- Height: 6 ft 0 in (1.83 m)
- Position: Defender

Senior career*
| Years | Team | Apps | (Gls) |
| 2000–2005 | Village United | | |
| 2005 | Harrisburg City Islanders | 18 | (2) |
| 2006 | Charleston Battery | 7 | (0) |
| 2006– | Village United | | |

International career
| ? | Jamaica | 3 | (0) |
- * Club domestic league appearances and goals as of 25 February 2007

Shane Crawford (born 16 November 1979) is a Jamaican professional football player who plays as a defender.

In 2000, Crawford began his professional career with Village United F.C. in Jamaica. In 2005, he signed with the Harrisburg City Islanders of the USL Second Division. In 2006, he spent the season with the Charleston Battery in the USL First Division. In the fall of 2006, he returned to Jamaica where he rejoined Village United.
