= Winston Chung Fah =

Jamaican football manager)

Winston Chung Fah (1964 – 2018) was a Jamaican football manager.

== Career ==
Chung Fah played as a goalkeeper in his youth. He was described as a "legend and icon of Jamaican football".

== Personal life ==
Chung Fah was nicknamed "Chungie".
