= August Town F.C. =

Jamaican football club

- Full name: August Town Football Club
- Ground: UWI Bowl; August Town, Jamaica
- Capacity: 3,000
- League: KSAFA Major League
Home colours	Away colours

The August Town Football Club is a Jamaican football club, which currently plays in the KSAFA Major League.

== History ==
The team has never won the National Premier League, in fact, the team was only promoted to the Jamaica National Premier League for the start of the 2006/2007 season, making their debut in Jamaica's major football league. At the end of the 2007/2008 season, the team relegated to the second level of Jamaican football. After winning the Claro KSAFA Super League and the DPL playoffs, August Town return to the Digicel Premier League for the 2009/2010 season.

The team was once again relegated from the Digicel Premier League after the 2009/2010 football season. They were in contention for the Claro KSAFA Super League 2010/2011 competition which would see them promoted once again to the Premier League should they come out victorious. In the end they did not but won promotion in 2013 with coach Christopher Bender, after beating Volvo FC in a match to finish second in the promotion play-offs.

== Ground ==
The team is based in August Town, an eastern suburb of Kingston, Jamaica, with their home ground at the U.W.I. Bowl, which can hold a capacity of up to 3,000. The team will have to forgo the use of the field they call home for the first two months of the 2007/2008 National Premier League season as they await the construction of seating facilities. They will contest all six first-round games at Field No 1 at the same complex. Field No 1, which is normally used by neighbouring Elleston Flats as their home venue, recently had stands erected – a criterion for the hosting of Premier League matches.

== Achievements ==
- KSAFA Super League
  - Champions (2): 2007, 2009
- KSAFA Jackie Bell Knockout Competition
  - Champions (1): 2009–10
  - Runners-up (1): 2013–14
