= KSAFA Jackie Bell Knockout Competition =

Football tournament in Jamaica, 1987–2019

- Founded: 1987
- Region: Kingston and St. Andrew, Jamaica
- Teams: 38 (2014–15)
- Most championships: Arnett Gardens (7 titles)

The Jackie Bell Knockout Competition is KSAFA's cup competition for clubs in Kingston and St. Andrew since the tournament's inception in 1987. Tivoli Gardens are the most recent champions.

The competition was named in honor of the late Winthrop’s ‘Jackie’ Bell, a former Jamaican football manager.

The competition was indefinitely suspended in 2019 season due to lack of sponsorship and opportunities on the calendar to sustain the competition.

== Most Championships ==
Most Championships
| Wins | Club |
|---|---|
| 7 | Arnett Gardens |
| 6 | Harbour View |
| 6 | Tivoli Gardens |
| 4 | Waterhouse |
| 2 | Constant Spring |
| 1 | August Town |
| 1 | Boys' Town |
| 1 | Duhaney Park |
| 1 | JDF |
| 1 | Olympic Gardens |

== Past Winners ==
- 1987/88: Constant Spring
- 1988/89: Competition Abandoned
- 1989/90: Arnett Gardens
- 1990/91: Duhaney Park
- 1991/92: Arnett Gardens
- 1992/93: JDF
- 1993/94: Tivoli Gardens
- 1994/95: Arnett Gardens
- 1995/96: Harbour View
- 1996/97: Waterhouse
- 1997/98: Olympic Gardens
- 1998/99: Arnett Gardens
- 1999/00: Constant Spring
- 2000/01: Harbour View
- 2001/02: Waterhouse
- 2002/03: Waterhouse
- 2003/04: Tivoli Gardens
- 2004/05: Arnett Gardens
- 2005/06: Boys Town
- 2006/07: Harbour View
- 2007/08: Harbour View
- 2008/09: Tivoli Gardens
- 2009/10: August Town
- 2010/11: Harbour View
- 2011/12: Arnett Gardens
- 2012/13: Harbour View
- 2013/14: Tivoli Gardens
- 2014/15: Waterhouse
- 2015/16: Arnett Garden
- 2016/17: Tivoli Gardens
- 2017/18: Tivoli Gardens
- 2018/19: Not held
