= 2024 Liga Dominicana de Fútbol =

Liga Dominicana de Fútbol
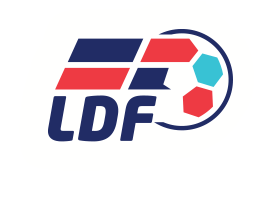
- Season: 2024
- CONCACAF Caribbean Cup: Cibao FC; Moca FC
- CFU Club Shield: Atlético Pantoja
- Matches: 120 (including liguilla, semifinals, and finals)

The 2024 season of the Liga Dominicana de Futbol is the 10th season of Association football in the Dominican Republic. Before the season started, a one-game play-off match was contested between Atlantico FC and Atletico Pantoja at Estadio Leonel Plácido. The match was held to determine the last slots for the upcoming 2024 CFU Club Shield. Atletico Pantoja won on penalties 4-2, securing them the 3rd and final slot for the Caribbean Cup. The season started on 8 March 2024 with eight teams, as Jarabacoa FC has been relegated for the 2024 season in a decision to have their home turf renovated along with overall improvements to their club.

== Competition system ==
The Liga Dominicana de Futbol tournament will consist of three parts:

- Regular Season: The competition format will have a regular three-round phase, with a minimum of twenty-one matches for all clubs. This phase will be played from March to July 2024. The six best qualifiers from the regular phase go to the Liguilla, in a round-robin format. From there, the best four teams advance to the semifinals, with their winners going to the grand final of the LDF 2024, all of which have 2-legged matches.

The order of classification of the teams will be determined in a general calculation table, as follows:

- 1) Higher number of points;
- 2) Greater goal difference in favor; in case of equality;
- 3) Higher number of goals scored; in case of equality;
- 4) Highest number of away goals scored; in case of equality;
- 5) Fewest red cards received; in case of equality;
- 6) Fewest yellow cards received; in case of equality;
- 7) Draw.
- Liguilla: The six teams classified from the regular season will play a system of all against all. Each team will play a total of five matches in their own field and in the opposite field, making a total of ten rounds. The top four teams at the end of the League will advance to the Play-offs. The ranking order will be the same as for the Regular Season.
- Play-offs: An elimination system will be played, the first place in the Liguilla will face the fourth place and the second place will face the third. Both keys will be played in two games and the winners will advance to the Grand Final, which will also be played in two games.

== Participating teams ==
A total of 8 teams will compete in the 2024 Tournament.

=== Teams by province ===
| Province | N.º | Teams |
|---|---|---|
| Distrito Nacional | 2 | Club Atlético Pantoja & O&M FC |
| La Vega | 1 | Atlético Vega Real |
| La Romana | 1 | Delfines del Este FC |
| Puerto Plata | 1 | Atlántico FC |
| San Cristóbal | 1 | Atlético San Cristóbal |
| Santiago Province | 1 | Cibao FC |
| Espaillat | 1 | Moca FC |

=== Team information ===
| Team | Manager | City | Stadium | Capacity | Established | Sponsors | Uniforms |
|---|---|---|---|---|---|---|---|
| Atlántico FC | (Venezuela) Miguel Ángel Acosta | Puerto Plata | Estadio Leonel Plácido | 2,000 | 2015 | (Dominican Republic) Ocean World (Dominican Republic) Farmacia Popular | (Dominican Republic) Batu Wear |
| Atlético Pantoja | (Argentina) Alejandro Trionfini | Santo Domingo | Félix Sánchez Olympic Stadium | 27,000 | 1999 | (Dominican Republic) Banco BHD León (Dominican Republic) Laboratorios Rowe | (Peru) Walon Sport |
| Atlético San Cristóbal | (Venezuela) Johannes Hernández | San Cristóbal | Estadio Panamericano | 2,800 | 2015 | (China) Loncin Holdings | (Dominican Republic) Batú Wear |
| Atlético Vega Real | (Argentina) Nahuel Bernabei | La Vega | Estadio Olímpico | 7,000 | 2014 | (Dominican Republic) Angloamericana de Seguros (Dominican Republic) Alaver | (Dominican Republic) LAF Sport |
| Cibao FC | (Argentina) Gabriel Martínez Poch | Santiago de los Caballeros | Estadio Cibao FC | 12,000 | 2015 | (Dominican Republic) Banreservas | (Germany) Puma |
| Moca FC | (Venezuela) Jean Carlos Güell | Moca | Estadio Complejo Deportivo Moca 86 | 2,000 | 1971 | PETS Animal Feed | (Dominican Republic) Batú Wear |
| Delfines del Este FC | (Dominican Republic) Edward Acevedo | Santo Domingo Este | Parque del Este | 1,200 | 2014 | (Dominican Republic) Banco Popular | (Mexico) Bee Sport |
| O&M FC | (Argentina) Daniel Lanata | Santo Domingo | Félix Sánchez Olympic Stadium | 27,000 | 1974 | (Dominican Republic) Universidad Dominicana O&M | (Dominican Republic) HEB |

== League table ==
| Pos | Team | Pld | W | D | L | GF | GA | GD | Pts | Qualification or relegation |
|---|---|---|---|---|---|---|---|---|---|---|
| 1 | Cibao (A) | 21 | 13 | 6 | 2 | 43 | 16 | +27 | 45 | Advance to Liguilla |
| 2 | Universidad O&M (A) | 21 | 10 | 8 | 3 | 31 | 15 | +16 | 38 | Advance to Liguilla |
| 3 | Moca (A) | 21 | 9 | 8 | 4 | 38 | 21 | +17 | 35 | Advance to Liguilla |
| 4 | Delfines del Este (A) | 21 | 7 | 9 | 5 | 35 | 32 | +3 | 30 | Advance to Liguilla |
| 5 | Atlético Pantoja (A) | 21 | 7 | 6 | 8 | 45 | 30 | +15 | 27 | Advance to Liguilla |
| 6 | Atlántico FC (A) | 21 | 7 | 5 | 9 | 23 | 26 | −3 | 26 | Advance to Liguilla |
| 7 | Atlético Vega Real | 21 | 6 | 7 | 8 | 21 | 25 | −4 | 25 | |
| 8 | Atlético San Cristóbal | 21 | 0 | 1 | 20 | 6 | 77 | −71 | 1 | |

Source: FlashFootball
(A) Advance to a further round

== Liguilla ==
| Pos | Team | Pld | W | D | L | GF | GA | GD | Pts | Qualification or relegation |
|---|---|---|---|---|---|---|---|---|---|---|
| 1 | Cibao | 10 | 5 | 4 | 1 | 17 | 8 | +9 | 19 | Advance to Final Stage |
| 2 | Atlético Pantoja | 10 | 4 | 5 | 1 | 21 | 10 | +11 | 17 | Advance to Final Stage |
| 3 | Universidad O&M | 10 | 3 | 5 | 2 | 9 | 8 | +1 | 14 | Advance to Final Stage |
| 4 | Moca | 10 | 4 | 1 | 5 | 10 | 13 | −3 | 13 | Advance to Final Stage |
| 5 | Delfines del Este | 10 | 2 | 3 | 5 | 12 | 15 | −3 | 9 | |
| 6 | Atlántico FC | 10 | 1 | 4 | 5 | 11 | 26 | −15 | 7 | |

Source: Soccerway

== Semi-finals ==
=== Summary ===
The first leg will be played on 2 September 2024 and the second leg will be played on 15 and 16 September 2024.

| Team 1 | Agg. | Team 2 | 1st leg | 2nd leg |
|---|---|---|---|---|
| Universidad O&M | 4–4 | Atlético Pantoja | 1–2 | 3–2 |
| CIbao | 3–0 | Moca | 0–0 | 3–0 |

=== Matches ===
First Leg

2 November 2024
16:45 UTC+8

| Moca | 0–0 | Cibao |

Estadio Complejo Deportivo Moca 85

Second Leg

2 September 2024
16:15 UTC-3

| Cibao FC | 3–0 | Moca FC |

Estadio Cibao FC

First Leg

2 September 2024
16:45 UTC-3

| Universidad O&M | 1–2 | Atlético Pantoja |

Estadio Panamericano San Cristóbal

Second Leg

16 November 2024
16:15 UTC-3

| Atlético Pantoja | 2–3 | Universidad O&M |

Estadio Panamericano San Cristóbal

== Final ==
| Team 1 | Agg. | Team 2 | 1st leg | 2nd leg |
|---|---|---|---|---|
| Universidad O&M | 3-4 | Cibao | 2–1 | 1–3 |

22 September 2024
16:30 UTC−3

| Universidad O&M | 2-1 | Cibao |

Estadio Panamericano San Cristóbal
29 September 2024
18:30 UTC−3

| Cibao | 3-1 | Universidad O&M |

Estadio Cibao FC

== Attendances ==
| # | Football club | Average attendance |
|---|---|---|
| 1 | Cibao FC | 746 |
| 2 | Atlántico FC | 553 |
| 3 | Moca FC | 455 |
| 4 | Atlético Vega Real | 297 |
| 5 | Atlético Pantoja | 196 |
| 6 | Delfines del Este FC | 192 |
| 7 | O&M FC | 170 |
| 8 | CA San Cristóbal | 122 |
