= 2021 Liga Dominicana de Fútbol =

Liga Dominicana de Fútbol
- Season: 2021
- Champions: Cibao FC
- 2022 CFU Club Championship: Cibao FC Atlético Vega Real
- Matches: 126
- Goals: 320 (2.54 per match)

The Liga Dominicana de Fútbol 2021 is the seventh season of the LDF, the Dominican Republic's professional football league.

== Competition system ==
The Liga Dominicana de Futbol tournament will consist of three parts:

- 'Regular Season:' A system of all against all will be played. Each team will play a total of 9 games in their own field and in the opposite field, making a total of 18 games. The top six teams at the end of the Regular Season will advance to the League.

The order of classification of the teams will be determined in a general calculation table, as follows:

- 1) Higher number of points;
- 2) Greater goal difference in favor; in case of equality;
- 3) Higher number of goals scored; in case of equality;
- 4) Highest number of away goals scored; in case of equality;
- 5) Fewest red cards received; in case of equality;
- 6) Fewest yellow cards received; in case of equality;
- 7) Draw.
- 'Liguilla:' The six teams classified from the regular season will play a system of all against all. Each team will play a total of five matches in their own field and in the opposite field, making a total of ten rounds. The top four teams at the end of the League will advance to the Play-offs. The ranking order will be the same as for the Regular Season.
- 'Play-offs:' An elimination system will be played, the first place in the Liguilla will face the fourth place and the second place will face the third. Both keys will be played in two games and the winners will advance to the Grand Final, which will also be played in two games.

=== Classification for international competitions ===
The champion and runner-up of the 'Grand Final' will have a place in the CFU Club Championship

== Participating teams ==
A total of 10 teams will compete in the 2021 Tournament.

=== Teams by Province ===
Province	N.º	Teams
Distrito Nacional	2	Club Atlético Pantoja y O&M FC
La Vega	2	Atlético Vega Real y Jarabacoa FC
La Romana	1	Delfines del Este FC
Puerto Plata	1	Atlántico FC
San Cristóbal	1	Atlético San Cristóbal
Santiago Province	1	Cibao FC

=== Team Information ===
Team	Manager	City	Stadium	Capacity	Establish	Sponsors	Uniforms
Atlántico FC	(Venezuela) Miguel Ángel Acosta	Puerto Plata	Estadio Leonel Plácido	2,000	2014	(Dominican Republic) Ocean World (Dominican Republic) Farmacia Popular	(Dominican Republic) Batu Wear
Atlético Pantoja	(Argentina) Alejandro Trionfini	Santo Domingo	Félix Sánchez Olympic Stadium	27,000	1999	(Dominican Republic) Banco BHD León (Dominican Republic) Laboratorios Rowe	(Peru) Walon Sport
Atlético San Cristóbal	(Venezuela) Johannes Hernández	San Cristóbal	Estadio Panamericano	2,800	2014	(China) Loncin Holdings	(Dominican Republic) Batú Wear
Atlético Vega Real	(Argentina) Nahuel Bernabei	La Vega	Estadio Olímpico	7,000	2014	(Dominican Republic) Angloamericana de Seguros (Dominican Republic) Alaver	(Dominican Republic) LAF Sport
Cibao FC	(Argentina) Jorge Alfonso	Santiago de los Caballeros	Estadio Cibao FC	12,000	2014	(Dominican Republic) Banreservas	(Germany)
Atlético San Francisco	(Venezuela) Jean Carlos Güell	San Francisco de Macorís	Estadio Julian Javier	1,200	2017		
Moca FC	(Mexico) Hiram Apaiz	Moca	Estadio Complejo Deportivo Moca 86	2,000	1971		
Delfines del Este FC	(Dominican Republic) Edward Acevedo	La Romana	Estadio Municipal La Romana	1,200	2014	—	(Mexico) Bee Sport
Jarabacoa FC	(Dominican Republic) Pedro Estévez	Jarabacoa	Estadio Olímpico	7,000	1986	(Dominican Republic) Banreservas (Dominican Republic) QA Company SRL	(Dominican Republic) Batú Wear
O&M FC	(Dominican Republic) Ronald Batista	Santo Domingo	Félix Sánchez Olympic Stadium	27,000	1974	(Dominican Republic) Universidad Dominicana O&M	(Dominican Republic) HEB

== Regular season ==
Pos	Team	Pld	W	D	L	GF	GA	GD	Pts	Qualification or relegation
1	Cibao	18	13	5	0	32	8	+24	44	Advance to Liguilla
2	Atlético Pantoja	18	10	4	4	34	17	+17	34	Advance to Liguilla
3	Moca	18	9	5	4	27	12	+15	32	Advance to Liguilla
4	Universidad O&M	18	9	5	4	26	17	+9	32	Advance to Liguilla
5	Jarabacoa	18	6	8	4	20	21	−1	26	Advance to Liguilla
6	Atlético Vega Real	18	7	3	8	26	26	0	24	Advance to Liguilla
7	Delfines del Este	18	5	2	11	20	41	−21	17	
8	Atlético San Cristóbal	18	4	4	10	16	27	−11	16	
9	Atlántico FC	18	3	5	10	22	26	−4	14	
10	Atlético San Francisco	18	3	1	14	15	41	−26	10	

Source: Soccerway

== Liguilla ==
Pos	Team	Pld	W	D	L	GF	GA	GD	Pts
1	Atlético Vega Real	10	5	3	2	12	12	0	18
2	Cibao	10	5	2	3	12	6	+6	17
3	Atlético Pantoja	10	4	4	2	14	9	+5	16
4	Jarabacoa	10	4	3	3	14	13	+1	15
5	Moca	10	2	3	5	6	9	−3	9
6	Universidad O&M	10	2	1	7	10	19	−9	7

Source: Soccerway
