= Frantzety Herard =

Haitian footballer (born 2002)

Personal information
- Date of birth: 10 March 2002 (age 24)
- Place of birth: Mirebalais, Haiti
- Height: 1.64 m (5 ft 5 in)
- Position: Winger

Team information
- Current team: Septemvri Sofia
- Number: 29

Youth career
- Instituto Iberia
- barcelona (academy): Cibao
- 2019: Vissel Kobe

Senior career*
Years	Team	Apps	(Gls)
2020–2022	Cibao	0	(0)
2022–2023	San Cristóbal	18	(4)
2023	Atlético Pantoja	25	(6)
2023–2024	Sheikh Russel KC	0	(0)
2024	Atlético Vega Real	27	(7)
2025	O&M FC	21	(5)
2026–	Septemvri Sofia	6	(0)

International career^{‡}
2019	Haiti U17	3	(0)
- * Club domestic league appearances and goals as of 26 May 2026 ‡ National team caps and goals as of 18:04, 30 January 2021 (UTC)

Frantzety Herard (born 10 March 2002) is a Haitian professional footballer who plays as a winger for Bulgarian First League club Septemvri Sofia.

== Club career ==
Herard was born in Mirebalais, Haiti, but moved to the Dominican Republic as a child. He started playing football at his school, the Instituto Iberia. He played for Cibao before moving to Japan to train with Vissel Kobe in 2019.

On his return to the Dominican Republic, Herard rejoined Cibao, where he played mostly for the club's reserve team in the Dominican second division. After two years with Cibao, he moved to San Cristóbal in March 2022. He scored his first goal for his new club on 23 April 2022, in a 2–2 draw with Moca.

In October 2023, Herard joined the Bangladesh Premier League club Sheikh Russel KC. He was registered in the club's official squad. However, he didn't make any appearances for the club.

In February 2024, he joined Liga Dominicana de Fútbol club Atlético Vega Real.

== Career statistics ==
=== Club ===
As of 5 May 2022.

Club	Season	League			Cup		Continental		Other		Total	
Club	Season	Division	Apps	Goals	Apps	Goals	Apps	Goals	Apps	Goals	Apps	Goals
Cibao	2020	LDF Banco Popular	0	0	0	0	1 (Note: Appearances in the CONCACAF League)	0	0	0	1	0
Cibao	2021	LDF Banco Popular	0	0	0	0	0	0	0	0	0	0
Cibao	Total		0	0	0	0	1	0	0	0	1	0
San Cristóbal	2022	LDF Banco Popular	18	4	0	0	–		0	0	18	4
Pantoja	2023	LDF Banco Popular	25	6	0	0	–		0	0	25	6
Sheikh Russel KC	2023-24	Bangladesh Football League	0	0	0	0	–		0	0	0	0
Vega Real	2024	LDF Banco Popular	27	7	0	0	–		0	0	27	7
O&M FC	2025	LDF Banco Popular	21	5	6	4	–		0	0	27	9
Career total			91	22	6	4	1	0	0	0	98	26
