= 2025 Copa Dominicana de Fútbol =

Copa Dominicana de Fútbol
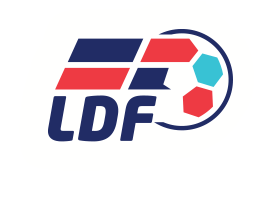
- Season: 2025
- Champions: Cibao FC (Copa de la LDF)
- CONCACAF Caribbean Cup: Cibao FC, O&M FC
- CFU Club Shield: Moca FC
- Matches: TBD (including liguilla, semifinals, and finals)

The 2025 season of the Copa Dominicana de Fútbol was the 3rd season of Association football cup tournament in the Dominican Republic. Before the regular season starts, The League will host a transition tournament from February 2025 to May 2025. The league introduced this in order for teams to adapt to the international calendar of most leagues in the world.

== Competition system ==
This transitional tournament, titled Copa de la Liga Dominicana de Fútbol was announced officially on LDF's socials on 25 November 2024. Scheduled to begin on February 21, the Cup will feature the last 8 teams from the 2024 season, the return of Jarabacoa F.C. since their FIFA ban, as well as three existing clubs from the LDF Expansión segunda división. The three clubs selected were Salcedo FC based in Salcedo, Santa Fe FC, and CBA Santo Domingo, both of which are based in the Zona Metropolitana of Santo Domingo. All three clubs were selected based on factors including general structures, seating capacity in home games, and history.The Copa de la LDF was played out as a Round-Robin format. Each team had a total of 11 matches in the regular phase, with the four best teams qualifying for the Semi-finals followed by a final phase of said tournament.The winner of the Cup will be granted a spot in the CONCACAF Caribbean Cup 2026.

As for the Regular season of The Liga Dominicana de Fútbol, the season will start on 8 August 2025, with finals slated to begin in May of 2026. Notable matches on Gameday 1 will be Defending Champions Cibao FC against regional rivals Moca FC, Atlético Vega Real and Club Atlético Pantoja, Atlántico will face the Delfines. For the 25-26 season, the tournament will consist of three parts:

- Regular Season: The competition format will have a regular three-round phase, with a minimum of eighteen matches for all clubs. Each club plays nine home games and nine away matches, with the top six teams from the regular phase advancing to the Liguilla.

The order of classification of the teams will be determined in a general calculation table, as follows:

- 1) Higher number of points;
- 2) Greater goal difference in favor; in case of equality;
- 3) Higher number of goals scored; in case of equality;
- 4) Highest number of away goals scored; in case of equality;
- 5) Fewest red cards received; in case of equality;
- 6) Fewest yellow cards received; in case of equality;
- 7) Draw.
- Liguilla: The six teams classified from the regular season will play a system of all against all. Each team will play a total of fifteen matches in their own field and in the opposite field, meaning they will face one-another a total of three times. The top four teams at the end of the Liguilla will advance to the Semi-finals. The ranking order will be the same as for the Regular Season.
- Semi-Finals: An elimination system will be played, the first place in the Liguilla will face the fourth place and the second place will face the third. Both keys will be played in two games and the winners will advance to the Grand Final, which will also be played in two games.

== Participating teams ==
A total of 12 teams will compete in the 2025 Transition Tournament, after which only one team will be promoted to LDF's First Division for the regular season.

=== Teams by Province ===
Province	N.º	Teams
Distrito Nacional	5	Club Atlético Pantoja, O&M FC, Santa Fe FC, CBA Santo Domingo, Delfines del Este FC
La Vega	2	Atlético Vega Real & Jarabacoa FC
Puerto Plata	1	Atlántico FC
San Cristóbal	1	Atlético San Cristóbal
Santiago Province	1	Cibao FC
Espaillat	1	Moca FC
Hermanas Mirabal	1	Salcedo FC

=== Team Information ===
Team	Manager	City	Stadium	Capacity	Established	Sponsors	Uniforms
Atlántico FC	(Venezuela) Miguel Ángel Acosta	Puerto Plata	Estadio Leonel Plácido	2,000	2015	(Dominican Republic) Ocean World (Dominican Republic) Farmacia Popular	(Dominican Republic) Batu Wear
Atlético Pantoja	(Argentina) Alejandro Trionfini	Santo Domingo	Félix Sánchez Olympic Stadium	27,000	1999	(Dominican Republic) Banco BHD (Dominican Republic) Laboratorios Rowe	(Peru) Walon Sport
Atlético San Cristóbal	(Venezuela) Johannes Hernández	San Cristóbal	Estadio Panamericano	2,800	2015	(China) Loncin Holdings	(Dominican Republic) Batú Wear
Atlético Vega Real	(Cuba) Raul Gonzalez	La Vega	Estadio Olímpico	7,000	2014	(Dominican Republic) Angloamericana de Seguros (Dominican Republic) Alaver	(Dominican Republic) LAF Sport
Cibao FC	(Argentina) Gabriel Martínez Poch	Santiago de los Caballeros	Estadio Cibao FC	8,000	2015	(Dominican Republic) Banreservas	(Germany) Puma
Moca FC	(Venezuela) Jean Carlos Güell	Moca	Estadio Complejo Deportivo Moca 86	2,000	1971	PETS Animal Feed	(Dominican Republic) Batú Wear
Delfines del Este FC	(Dominican Republic) Edward Acevedo	Santo Domingo Este	Parque del Este	1,200	2014	(Dominican Republic) Banco Popular	(Mexico) Bee Sport
O&M FC	(Spain) Jose Aparacio	Santo Domingo	Félix Sánchez Olympic Stadium	27,000	1974	(Dominican Republic) Universidad Dominicana O&M	(Dominican Republic) HEB
Salcedo FC	(Dominican Republic) Arturo Berroa	Salcedo	Estadio Domingo Polonia	2,000	1992	(Dominican Republic) JUMBO	(Dominican Republic)
CBA Santo Domingo	(Cuba) Yolan Peña	Santo Domingo	TBD	Unconfirmed	1989	(Dominican Republic) General de Seguros	(Dominican Republic)
Santa Fe FC	(Argentina) Alejandro Trionfini	Santo Domingo	Complejo Santa Fe	Unconfirmed	1992	(Dominican Republic) AFP Siembra	(Spain) Luanvi
Jarabacoa FC	(Colombia) Carlos Echeverry	Jarabacoa	Estadio Junior Mejia	1,500	1992	(Dominican Republic)	(United States) Diaza Sportswear

== Transition Tournament Standings ==
Pos	Team	Pld	W	D	L	GF	GA	GD	Pts	Qualification or relegation
1	Cibao	11	8	3	0	31	6	+25	27	Advance to Semi-finals
2	Delfines del Este	11	7	3	1	15	4	+11	24	Advance to Semi-finals
3	Atlético Pantoja	11	7	2	2	27	11	+16	23	Advance to Semi-finals
4	Moca	11	7	0	4	10	8	+2	21	Advance to Semi-finals
5	Atlántico FC	11	4	5	2	14	10	+4	17	
6	Universidad O&M	11	5	2	4	18	15	+3	17	
7	Salcedo FC	11	4	3	4	17	11	+6	15	
8	Santa Fe FC	11	4	3	4	15	17	−2	15	
9	Atlético Vega Real	11	4	0	7	17	12	+5	12	
10	CBA Santo Domingo	11	2	1	8	8	39	−31	7	
11	Jarabacoa FC	11	1	1	9	6	27	−21	4	
12	Atlético San Cristóbal	11	0	3	8	7	25	−18	3	

Source: LIVESPORT

== Semi Finals ==
First Leg

4 May 2025
17:45

Moca	0–2	Cibao
		Javier roces 64' Daiver Vega 83'

Estadio Complejo Deportivo Moca 85

Second Leg

10 May 2025
17:45

Cibao	0–0	Moca

Estadio Cibao FC

First Leg

3 May 2025
16:45 UTC-3

Pantoja	0-1	Delfines
		Christopher Almonte 43'

Estadio Parque del Este

Second Leg

11 May 2025
16:15 UTC-3

Delfines	0-0	Pantoja

Estadio Panamericano del Este

== Finals ==
First Leg

17 May 2025
16:45 UTC-3

Delfines	1-1	Cibao
Richerly De los Santos 72'		Edipo Rodriguez 49'

Estadio Parque del Este

Second Leg

24 May 2025

Delfines	0-1	Cibao

Estadio Cibao FC
