= List of football clubs in the Dominican Republic =

The List of football clubs in the Dominican Republic includes association football clubs competing in the Dominican Republic, including those participating in the Liga Dominicana de Fútbol.

== The football clubs ==
- 2015 Liga Dominicana de Fútbol
  - Club Barcelona Atlético (Santo Domingo)
  - Bauger FC (Santo Domingo)
  - Club Atlético Pantoja (Santo Domingo)
  - Atlético Vega Real (La Vega)
  - Moca FC (Moca)
  - Cibao FC (Santiago de los Caballeros)
  - Atlético San Cristóbal (San Cristóbal)
  - O&M FC (Santo Domingo)
  - Delfines del Este FC (La Romana)
  - Atlántico FC (Puerto Plata)
  - TEC-FC (Santo Domingo)
  - CD Domingo Salvio (La Vega)
  - Don Bosco Jarabacoa FC (Jarabacoa)
  - Inter de Bayaguana (Bayaguana)
  - Leones De Alma Rosa FC (Santo Domingo)
  - Universidad O&M FC (Santo Domingo)
  - Romana FC (La Romana)
  - Bob Soccer School FC (Santo Domingo)
  - Atlético de San Francisco (San Francisco de Macorís)
