= 2019 Liga Dominicana de Fútbol =

Liga Dominicana de Fútbol
- Season: 2019
- Champions: Atlético Pantoja
- Matches: 122
- Goals: 270 (2.21 per match)

The 2019 Liga Dominicana de Fútbol (known as the LDF Banco Popular for sponsorship reasons) was the fifth season of professional football in the Dominican Republic. The season started on 30 March 2019.

== Format ==
The 2019 tournament of the Liga Dominicana de Futbol will start with 12 teams. The event will be developed with a new format, each of the twelve clubs can have up to 6 foreign players on their payroll.

The new format includes an "Apertura" and a "Clausura" tournament; both will be played over one round and have been agreed with the twelve clubs and also with CONCACAF. The "Apertura" will have a semifinal with the four best teams and then a final, as will the "Clausura".

Then the champion of each tournament will compete to win the qualification to the CONCACAF championship tournament. Another club will qualify for the CONCACAF tournament, accumulating the most points in both tournaments.

== Apertura ==
=== Regular season ===
Pos	Team	Pld	W	D	L	GF	GA	GD	Pts	Qualification or relegation
1	Cibao (Q)	10	8	2	0	22	5	+17	26	Advance to Playoffs
2	Jarabacoa (Q)	10	5	3	2	11	6	+5	18	Advance to Playoffs
3	Atlético Pantoja (Q)	10	5	2	3	19	9	+10	17	Advance to Playoffs
4	Moca (Q)	10	4	4	2	8	5	+3	16	Advance to Playoffs
5	Atlético Vega Real	10	4	3	3	12	15	−3	15	
6	Universidad O&M	10	3	4	3	15	9	+6	13	
7	Atlético San Francisco	10	1	7	2	9	11	−2	10	
8	Atlántico	10	0	8	2	8	11	−3	8	
9	Barcelona Atlético	10	2	2	6	8	19	−11	8	
10	Delfines del Este	10	1	4	5	10	17	−7	7	
11	Atlético San Cristóbal	10	2	1	7	8	23	−15	7	
12	Inter RD	0	0	0	0	0	0	0	0	Did not enter

Source: Soccerway
(Q) Qualified for the phase indicated

=== Regular season results ===
Home \ Away	ATL	ASC	ASF	AVR	CIB	CAP	CBA	DDE	IRD	JAR	MOC	UOM
Atlántico FC	—	—	0–0	—	1–1	0–0	—	—	—	—	—	1–1
Atlético San Cristóbal	1–1	—	—	—	—	—	2–1	2–1	—	0–2	—	0–1
Atlético de San Francisco	—	2–0	—	1–1	—	—	1–1	1–1	—	1–1	—	—
Atlético Vega Real	2–2	2–1	—	—	—	—	1–0	2–1	—	1–0	—	—
Cibao FC	—	8–2	2–0	4–1	—	2–1	—	—	—	—	0–0	—
Club Atlético Pantoja	—	2–0	1–1	4–1	—	—	4–0	—	—	1–2	1–2	—
Club Barcelona Atlético	1–1	—	—	—	0–1	—	—	2–1	—	1–2	2–0	0–6
Delfines del Este FC	3–2	—	—	—	0–2	0–3	—	—	—	—	1–1	1–1
Inter RD	—	—	—	—	—	—	—	—	—	—	—	—
Jarabacoa FC	2–0	—	—	—	0–1	—	—	1–1	—	—	1–0	0–0
Moca FC	0–0	3–0	0–0	1–0	—	—	—	—	—	—	—	1–0
Universidad O&M F.C.	—	—	4–2	1–1	0–1	1–2	—	—	—	—	—	—

Source: RSSSF
Legend: Blue = home team win; Yellow = draw; Red = away team win.

=== Playoffs ===
Semifinals
4	Moca	0	1	1
1	Cibao	2	1	3
3	Atlético Pantoja (a.e.t.), (p)	1	0	1 (3)
2	Jarabacoa	1	0	1 (2)

Final
1	Cibao	0 (0)
3	Atlético Pantoja (a.e.t.), (p)	0 (3)

== Clausura ==
=== Regular season ===
Pos	Team	Pld	W	D	L	GF	GA	GD	Pts	Qualification or relegation
1	Cibao (Q)	10	7	1	2	17	10	+7	22	Advance to Playoffs
2	Atlético Vega Real (Q)	10	5	3	2	16	7	+9	18	Advance to Playoffs
3	Atlético San Cristóbal (Q)	10	5	3	2	13	10	+3	18	Advance to Playoffs
4	Atlántico (Q)	10	4	4	2	10	8	+2	16	Advance to Playoffs
5	Delfines del Este	10	4	3	3	10	7	+3	15	
6	Jarabacoa	10	4	3	3	10	9	+1	15	
7	Atlético Pantoja	10	4	2	4	12	9	+3	14	
8	Moca	10	3	5	2	9	10	−1	13 (Note: Moca were deducted 1 point.)	
9	Universidad O&M	10	3	2	5	10	12	−2	11	
10	Atlético San Francisco	10	2	2	6	6	16	−10	8	
11	Barcelona Atlético	10	0	0	10	4	19	−15	0	
12	Inter RD	0	0	0	0	0	0	0	0	Did not enter

Source: Soccerway
(Q) Qualified for the phase indicated

=== Regular season results ===
Home \ Away	ATL	ASC	ASF	AVR	CIB	CAP	CBA	DDE	IRD	JAR	MOC	UOM
Atlántico FC	—	2–0	—	0–3	—	—	2–0	0–0	—	2–2	1–1	—
Atlético San Cristóbal	—	—	2–0	2–3	2–2	1–0	—	—	—	—	1–1	—
Atlético de San Francisco	0–1	—	—	—	0–2	1–1	—	—	—	—	1–0	1–1
Atlético Vega Real	—	—	5–1	—	1–2	0–0	—	—	—	—	1–1	1–0
Cibao FC	1–0	—	—	—	—	—	2–0	2–1	—	2–0	—	1–3
Club Atlético Pantoja	0–1	—	—	—	1–2	—	—	2–1	—	—	—	2–0
Club Barcelona Atlético	—	1–2	1–2	0–2	—	1–2	—	—	—	—	—	—
Delfines del Este FC	—	0–1	1–0	0–0	—	—	2–0	—	—	2–0	—	—
Inter RD	—	—	—	—	—	—	—	—	—	—	—	—
Jarabacoa FC	—	1–1	2–0	1–0	—	2–1	2–0	—	—	—	—	—
Moca FC	—	—	—	—	2–1	0–3	1–0	1–1	—	0–0	—	—
Universidad O&M F.C.	1–1	0–1	—	—	—	—	2–1	1–2	—	1–0	1–2	—

Updated to match(es) played on completed. Source: RSSSF
Legend: Blue = home team win; Yellow = draw; Red = away team win.

=== Playoffs ===
Semifinals
4	Atlántico	0	0	0
1	Cibao	1	1	2
3	Atlético San Cristóbal	3	2	5
2	Atlético Vega Real	2	1	3

Final
1	Cibao	3
3	Atlético San Cristóbal	0

== Grand final ==
Played between champions of Apertura and Clausura.

9 November 2019

Atlético Pantoja	1–2	Cibao
	Report

Estadio Olímpico Félix Sánchez, Santo Domingo
Referee: Carlos Mateo
23 November 2019

Cibao	0–1	Atlético Pantoja
	Report
Penalties
	2–4

Estadio Cibao FC, Santiago de los Caballeros
Referee: Randy Encarnación Solano

Atlético Pantoja qualifies for 2020 Caribbean Club Championship.

== Aggregate table ==
Pos	Team	Pld	W	D	L	GF	GA	GD	Pts	Qualification or relegation
1	Cibao (Q)	20	15	3	2	39	15	+24	48	Caribbean Club Championship (Note: As aggregate table best team not yet qualified.)
2	Atlético Vega Real	20	9	6	5	28	22	+6	33	
3	Jarabacoa	20	9	6	5	21	15	+6	33	
4	Atlético Pantoja (Q)	20	9	4	7	31	18	+13	31	Caribbean Club Championship (Note: As grand final winners.)
5	Moca	20	7	9	4	17	15	+2	29 (Note: Moca were deducted 1 point.)	
6	Atlético San Cristóbal	20	7	4	9	21	33	−12	25	
7	Universidad O&M	20	6	6	8	25	21	+4	24	
8	Atlántico	20	4	12	4	18	19	−1	24	
9	Delfines del Este	20	5	7	8	20	24	−4	22	
10	Atlético San Francisco	20	3	9	8	15	27	−12	18	
11	Barcelona Atlético	20	2	2	16	12	38	−26	8	
12	Inter RD	0	0	0	0	0	0	0	0	Did not enter

Source: Soccerway Soccerway
(Q) Qualified for the phase indicated
