= Gerard Lavergne =

Dominican Republic footballer (b. 1999)

Personal information
- Full name: Gerard Paul Lavergne Matos
- Date of birth: 25 January 1999 (age 27)
- Place of birth: Santo Domingo, Dominican Republic
- Height: 1.73 m (5 ft 8 in)
- Position: Central midfielder

Team information
- Current team: Moca FC
- Number: 8

Youth career
- Academia La Meca del Fútbol
- Escuela Bauger
- Academia La Meca del Fútbol
- Escuela Campascasio

Senior career*
| Years | Team | Apps | (Gls) |
| 2015–2018 | Cibao | 17 | (0) |
| 2019 | América SD | | |
| 2019 | Atlético San Cristóbal | 3+ | (3) |
| 2020–2021 | Atlético Pantoja | 4 | (0) |
| 2021 | FC Tucson | 1 | (0) |
| 2021 | York United | 6 | (0) |
| 2022–2026 | Atlético Pantoja | 122 | (6) |
| 2026- | Moca FC | 3 | (0) |

International career^{‡}
| | Dominican Republic U15 | | (4) |
- Dominican Republic U17
| 2018 | Dominican Republic U20 | 4 | (4) |
| 2021 | Dominican Republic U23 | 8 | (0) |
| 2018– | Dominican Republic | 11 | (0) |
- * Club domestic league appearances and goals as of 2 September 2026 ‡ National team caps and goals as of 10 December 2021

Gerard Paul Lavergne Matos (born 25 January 1999) is a Dominican professional footballer who plays as a midfielder for Liga DF club Atlético Pantoja and the Dominican Republic national team.

== Club career ==
On 4 March 2021, Lavergne joined FC Tucson in USL League One.

He made the switch to Canadian Premier League side York United on 3 June 2021. He made his debut for York on July 12. In December 2021 York announced they had declined Lavergne's contract option.

== International career ==
Lavergne made his senior debut for Dominican Republic on 22 March 2018, being a second-half substitute in a 4–0 friendly win against Turks and Caicos Islands.

== Honours ==
Cibao

- Copa Dominicana de Fútbol: 2015, 2016
