= Football in the Dominican Republic =

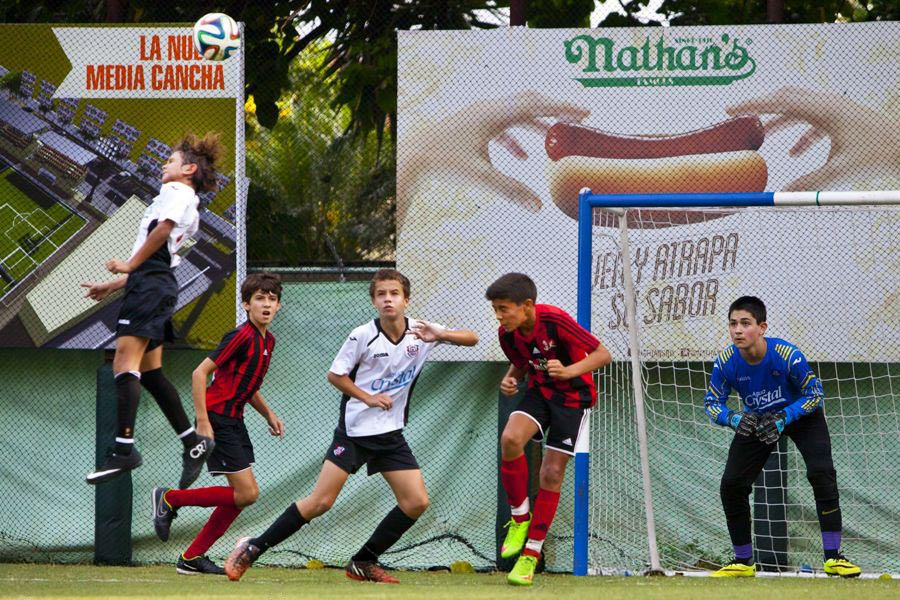
- Boys playing association football in a tournament in the Santo Domingo’s middle-class neighborhood of Altos de Arroyo Hondo.
- Country: Dominican Republic
- Governing body: Dominican Football Federation
- National team: men's national team

National competitions
- Copa Dominicana de Fútbol

Club competitions
- Liga Dominicana de Fútbol

International competitions
- CONCACAF Champions League; CONCACAF League; Caribbean Club Championship; FIFA Club World Cup; CONCACAF Gold Cup (National Team); CONCACAF Nations League (National Team); FIFA World Cup (National Team)

The sport of football in the country of the Dominican Republic is run by the Federación Dominicana de Fútbol. The association administers the national football team, as well as the Liga Dominicana de Fútbol. In the Dominican Republic, baseball is the most popular sport, followed by basketball or association football, depending on the area in the Dominican Republic. Football is considered to be in constant growth since 2012. Approximately 45% of the people in the Dominican Republic are considered football fans.

Football was usually played from middle to high-class high school students, especially in urban areas like Santo Domingo, Santiago, Puerto Plata, Moca and Jarabacoa, however, in the last few years, the sport has expanded and it is played mostly everywhere in the country. That the sport was first played by wealthy children created an extreme commercialization on the sport, where most of the available football courts, where children are to master their skills, have to be rented, prices often range between 40 - US$50 an hour, nonetheless, there are futsal courts available for free.

Nowadays, football is considered to be on par with basketball in terms of popularity in the country.

== History ==
Football was first introduced to the Dominican Republic at the beginning of the 20th century. For a long time, the country was not renowned in the sport, due to football being played only in amateur level.

From the 2010s and onward, more concrete attempts were made to professionalise football in the country. In 2014, the Liga Dominicana de Fútbol was founded as the first-ever professional football league in the country, in an attempt to boost the country's football profile.

Since 2020s, Dominican Republic has experienced a dramatic rise in fortune at the sport. The country's U-23 team qualified for the 2020 CONCACAF Men's Olympic Qualifying Championship, but fell short, losing all three games and failing to reach the 2020 Summer Olympics. Nonetheless, its rise in fortune has been facilitated by the recent success of the U-20 team, when the country reached a major football final for the first time in the 2022 CONCACAF U-20 Championship. Though falling short, the Dominican Republic was able to secure two historic football debuts in 2023 FIFA U-20 World Cup as well as the 2024 Summer Olympics. Its recent rise in fortune has been attributed to the professionalisation of football in the country.

== League ==
The Liga Dominicana de Fútbol is the top professional league in the Dominican Republic, it began in 2014.

== League system ==
Level	League(s)/Division(s)
1	Liga Dominicana de Fútbol; 12 clubs

== National team ==
The Dominican Republic national team qualified for its first major international tournament with the 2025 CONCACAF Gold Cup.

== Football stadiums ==
Stadium	Location	Capacity	Tenants	Image
Estadio Olímpico Félix Sánchez	Santo Domingo	27,000	Dominican Republic national football team, Atlético Pantoja, Bauger FC	

== Attendances ==
The average attendance per top-flight football league season and the club with the highest average attendance:

Season	League average	Best club	Best club average
2024	341	Cibao FC	746

Source: League page on Wikipedia
