= Alexander Vidal Ceballos =

Dominican footballer

Alexander Vidal
Personal information
- Full name: Manuel Alexander Vidal Ceballos
- Date of birth: 2 September 1996 (age 30)
- Place of birth: Santiago, Dominican Republic
- Height: 1.83 m (6 ft 0 in)
- Position: Centre-back

Team information
- Current team: Moca
- Number: 17

Youth career
- La Academia de Fútbol Santiago

Senior career*
Years	Team	Apps	(Gls)
2015–2018	Cibao	26	(5)
2018	Atletico San Francisco		
2019–2020	Moca		
2020	Atletico San Cristóbal		
2021	Moca	22	(3)
2022	Atlético Vega Real	19	(1)
2022	Cambita FC	5	(3)
2023–2024	Moca	27	(1)
2025-	Atlético Pantoja	35	(5)

International career^{‡}
	Dominican Republic U-17	3	(?)
	Dominican Republic U20	6	(?)
2015-	Dominican Republic	5	(0)
- * Club domestic league appearances and goals as of 29 March 2026 ‡ National team caps and goals as of 25 March 2025

Manuel Alexander Vidal Ceballos (born 2 September 1996) is a Dominican footballer who plays as a centre-back for Moca FC.

== Honours ==
- Cibao
  - CFU Club Championship (1): 2017
  - Copa Dominicana (2): 2015-2016
