= Yessy Mena =

Colombian footballer (born 1989)

Personal information
- Full name: Yessy Ferley Mena Palacios
- Date of birth: 15 July 1989 (age 37)
- Place of birth: Quibdó, Colombia
- Height: 1.70 m (5 ft 7 in)
- Position: Forward

Team information
- Current team: Atlético San Cristóbal

Senior career*
Years	Team	Apps	(Gls)
2008–2010	Envigado	21	(1)
2009	→ Águilas Doradas (loan)	30	(13)
2011	Unión Magdalena	6	(1)
2011–2014	Águilas Doradas	104	(28)
2014–2016	Atlético Junior	40	(6)
2016–2017	La Equidad	25	(3)
2017	Atlético Huila	2	(0)
2018	Leones	12	(2)
2019	KPV	17	(0)
2021	Delfines del Este	16	(3)
2021	Moca	9	(1)
2021	Deportivo Achuapa	7	(0)
2022	Jarabacoa	23	(8)
2023	Santa Tecla	6	(0)
2023–2024	Delfines del Este	32	(21)
2025–	Atlético San Cristóbal	3	(2)
- * Club domestic league appearances and goals as of 13 March 2025

Yessy Ferley Mena Palacios (born 15 July 1989) is a Colombian professional footballer who plays as a forward for Atlético San Cristóbal in the Liga Dominicana de Fútbol.
