= Rafael Flores (footballer) =

Dominican footballer (born 1991)

Personal information
- Full name: Rafael Leonardo Flores
- Date of birth: 24 April 1991 (age 35)
- Place of birth: Salcedo, Dominican Republic
- Position: Midfielder

Team information
- Current team: Cibao
- Number: 13

Youth career
- Deportivo Pantoja

Senior career*
Years	Team	Apps	(Gls)
2007–2011	Deportivo Pantoja		
2012–2013	Tempête FC		
2013–2014	Deportivo Pantoja		
2014	Jennings Grenades FC		
2015-2020	Cibao FC	14	(2)
2020-2021	Moca FC	20	(0)
2022-2024	O&M FC	46	(2)

International career^{‡}
2008–2021	Dominican Republic	48	(0)
- * Club domestic league appearances and goals ‡ National team caps and goals as of 9 June 2021

Rafael Leonardo Flores (born 24 April 1991) is a Dominican footballer who plays as a midfielder for Cibao FC and the Dominican Republic national team.

== Honours ==
- Cibao
  - CFU Club Championship (1): 2017
