= Copa Dominicana de Futbol 2015 =

- Teams: 17

The Copa Dominicana de Fútbol is the top tournament association football in the Dominican Republic. Created in 2015, it is open to all clubs and is affiliated with the Dominican Football Federation.

== Participating clubs ==
=== Liga Dominicana de Futbol ===
Cibao FC	O&M FC

=== Semi-pro & Amateur teams ===
Atlético FC	Bob Soccer FC	Campa FC	Cibao Atlético
Club 6 de Febrero	Deportivo Cóndor	Dimport Inter FC	El Bien FC
Garrincha FC	Herradura FC	Los 30 de Villa Tapia	Realiste FC
Salcedo FC	UNEV FC	Unión VPN FC

== Group Phase ==
=== Group A ===
Team	Pld	W	D	L	GF	GA	GD	Pts
O&M FC	3	3	0	0	7	0	+7	9
Garrincha FC	3	1	1	1	4	5	−1	4
UNEV FC	3	1	1	1	3	4	−1	4
Atlético FC	3	0	0	3	1	6	−5	0

Date	Stadium	Home	Results	Away
October 30	Olímpico Félix Sánchez	O&M FC	3 - 0	Atlético FC
November 1	Olímpico Félix Sánchez	Garrincha FC	2 - 2	UNEV FC
November 7	Parque del Este	Atlético FC	0 - 1	UNEV FC
November 14	Olímpico Félix Sánchez	O&M FC	2 - 0	UNEV FC
November 14	Parque del Este	Atlético FC	1 - 2	Garrincha FC
November 19	Olímpico Félix Sánchez	O&M FC	2 - 0	Garrincha FC

=== Group B ===
Team	Pld	W	D	L	GF	GA	GD	Pts
Bob Soccer FC	3	2	1	0	8	4	+4	7
Campa FC	3	2	0	1	12	6	+6	6
Dimport Inter FC	3	1	1	1	8	4	+4	4
El Bien FC	3	0	0	3	0	14	−14	0

Date	Stadium	Home	Results	Away
November 1	Panamericano	Campa FC	6 - 0	El Bien FC
November 6	Panamericano	Dimport Inter FC	1 - 1	Bob Soccer FC
November 8	Panamericano	Campa FC	3 - 2	Dimport Inter FC
November 15	Panamericano	El Bien FC	0 - 5	Dimport Inter FC
November 15	Panamericano	Campa FC	3 - 4	Bob Soccer FC
November 18	Panamericano	El Bien FC	0 - 3	Bob Soccer FC

=== Group C ===
Team	Pld	W	D	L	GF	GA	GD	Pts
Cibao FC	4	4	0	0	24	2	+22	12
Salcedo FC	4	1	2	1	8	7	+1	5
Unión VPN FC	4	1	2	1	5	4	+1	5
Realiste FC	4	0	3	1	4	7	−3	3
Deportivo Cóndor	4	0	1	3	1	22	−21	1

Date	Stadium	Home	Results	Away
October 30	Olímpico de La Vega	Unión VPN FC	3 - 0	Deportivo Cóndor
October 30	Salcedo	Salcedo FC	1 - 1	Realiste FC
November 1	Cibao FC	Cibao FC	4 - 1	Realiste FC
November 1	Olímpico de La Vega	Unión VPN FC	1 - 1	Salcedo FC
November 6	La Barranquita	Realiste FC	1 - 1	Deportivo Cóndor
November 6	Cibao FC	Cibao FC	5 - 1	Salcedo FC
November 8	Jarabacoa	Unión VPN FC	1 - 1	Realiste FC
November 8	Cibao FC	Cibao FC	13 - 0	Deportivo Cóndor
November 15	Cibao FC	Cibao FC	2 - 0	Unión VPN FC
November 15	Salcedo	Salcedo FC	5 - 0	Deportivo Cóndor

=== Group D ===
Team	Pld	W	D	L	GF	GA	GD	Pts
Cibao Atlético	3	2	1	0	6	3	+3	7
Herradura FC	3	1	1	1	7	7	0	4
Club 6 de Febrero	3	0	3	0	5	5	0	3
Los 30 de Villa Tapia	3	0	1	2	3	5	−2	1

Date	Stadium	Home	Results	Away
October 31	Leonel Plácido	Club 6 de Febrero	1 - 1	Los 30 de Villa Tapia
October 31	Cibao FC	Cibao Atlético	3 - 2	Herradura FC
November 7	Villa Tapia	Los 30 de Villa Tapia	1 - 2	Herradura FC
November 7	Leonel Plácido	Club 6 de Febrero	1 - 1	Cibao Atlético
November 14	Cibao FC	Cibao Atlético	2 - 1	Los 30 de Villa Tapia
November 14	La Barranquita	Herradura FC	3 - 3	Club 6 de Febrero

== Knockout stage ==
November 21 & 22
Cibao FC	12
Herradura FC	2
Cibao Atlético	2
Salcedo FC	3
O&M FC	2
Campa FC	0
Bob Soccer FC	4
Garrincha FC	0

November 29 (Ida); December 6 (Vuelta)
Cibao FC	2	5	7
Salcedo FC	1	0	1
O&M FC	1	1	2
Bob Soccer FC	0	0	0

Final; December 13
Cibao FC	3
O&M FC	1
