= César García (footballer, born 1993) =

Dominican footballer

Cesar García
Personal information
- Full name: César Manuel García Peralta
- Date of birth: 13 March 1993 (age 33)
- Place of birth: Jarabacoa, Dominican Republic
- Height: 1.86 m (6 ft 1 in)
- Position: Defender

Team information
- Current team: Atlético Vega Real
- Number: 93

Youth career
- 2004–2009: Jarabacoa FC

Senior career*
Years	Team	Apps	(Gls)
2010–2011	Jarabacoa FC		
2012	Puerto Rico Islanders	3	(0)
2012–2013	Jarabacoa FC	14	(10)
2013	Bayamón FC		
2014	Jarabacoa FC	5	(0)
2015	Bauger	4	
2016–2020	Cibao	27	(6)
2020	Jarabacoa FC	12	(5)
2021–2023	Real Santa Cruz	67	(12)
2023–2024	Oriente Petrolero	31	(2)
2025	Miami FC	9	(0)
2026	Oriente Petrolero	0	(0)
2026–	Atlético Vega Real	3	(0)

International career^{‡}
2012	Dominican Republic U20	3	(1)
2010–2024	Dominican Republic	57	(4)
- * Club domestic league appearances and goals as of 26 April 2026 ‡ National team caps and goals as of 29 March 2026

César Manuel “Danco” García Peralta (born 13 March 1993) is a Dominican professional footballer who plays as a defender.

== International career ==
=== International goals ===
Scores and results list the Dominican Republic's goal tally first.

No	Date	Venue	Opponent	Score	Result	Competition
1	14 November 2011	Truman Bodden Sports Complex, George Town, Cayman Islands	Cayman Islands	1–0	1–1	2014 FIFA World Cup qualification
2	7 December 2012	Antigua Recreation Ground, St. John's, Antigua and Barbuda	Antigua and Barbuda	1–1	2–1	2012 Caribbean Cup

== Honours ==
Cibao

- CFU Club Championship: 2017
