= Domingo Peralta =

Dominican footballer (born 1986)

Personal information
- Full name: Domingo Antonio Peralta Florencio
- Date of birth: 28 July 1986 (age 40)
- Place of birth: Mao, Dominican Republic
- Position: Forward

Senior career*
Years	Team	Apps	(Gls)
2010	Moca FC	12	(3)
2011–2012	Deportivo Pantoja		(5)
2012	AS Capoise	10	(2)
2012-2013	Moca FC	10	(1)
2014	Violette AC	7	(2)
2015–2017	Cibao FC		
2018	Moca FC		(9)
2019–2020	Vega Real		(5)
2021	O&M FC		
2022	Vega Real	9	(0)

International career
2010–2021	Dominican Republic	36	(8)
- * Club domestic league appearances and goals

Domingo Antonio Peralta Florencio (born 28 July 1986) is a Dominican former footballer who played as a forward. He made 36 appearances for the Dominican Republic national team, scoring eight goals.

== Career statistics ==
Scores and results list Dominican Republic's goal tally first.

No.	Date	Venue	Opponent	Score	Result	Competition
1.	14 October 2010	Estadio Panamericano, San Cristóbal, Dominican Republic	British Virgin Islands	2–0	17–0	2010 Caribbean Cup qualification
2.	14 October 2010	Estadio Panamericano, San Cristóbal, Dominican Republic	British Virgin Islands	4–0	17–0	2010 Caribbean Cup qualification
3.	14 October 2010	Estadio Panamericano, San Cristóbal, Dominican Republic	British Virgin Islands	12–0	17–0	2010 Caribbean Cup qualification
4.	8 July 2011	Estadio Panamericano, San Cristóbal, Dominican Republic	Anguilla	1–0	2–0	2014 FIFA World Cup qualification
5.	2 September 2011	Estadio Cuscatlán, San Salvador, El Salvador	El Salvador	2–3	2–3	2014 FIFA World Cup qualification
6.	25 October 2012	Stade René Serge Nabajoth, Les Abymes, Guadeloupe	Martinique	1–0	1–1	2012 Caribbean Cup qualification
7.	7 September 2014	Antigua Recreation Ground, St. John's, Antigua and Barbuda	Anguilla	7–0	10–0	2014 Caribbean Cup qualification
8.	7 September 2014	Antigua Recreation Ground, St. John's, Antigua and Barbuda	Anguilla	9–0	10–0	2014 Caribbean Cup qualification
9.	28 August 2016	Estadio Panamericano, San Cristóbal, Dominican Republic	Puerto Rico	3–0	5–0	Friendly
10.	28 August 2016	Estadio Panamericano, San Cristóbal, Dominican Republic	Puerto Rico	5–0	5–0	Friendly
11.	8 September 2018	Ergilio Hato Stadium, Willemstad, Curaçao	Bonaire	1–0	5–0	2019–20 CONCACAF Nations League qualification
12.	8 September 2018	Ergilio Hato Stadium, Willemstad, Curaçao	Bonaire	2–0	5–0	2019–20 CONCACAF Nations League qualification
13.	8 September 2018	Ergilio Hato Stadium, Willemstad, Curaçao	Bonaire	4–0	5–0	2019–20 CONCACAF Nations League qualification
14.	27 March 2021	Inter Miami CF Stadium, Fort Lauderdale, United States	Anguilla	5–0	6–0	2022 FIFA World Cup qualification

== Honours ==
Cibao

- CFU Club Championship: 2017
