= Scheldeur Sainvilus =

Haitian football manager (born 1988)

Personal information
- Full name: Scheldeur Junior Sainvilus
- Date of birth: 28 November 1988 (age 37)
- Place of birth: Haiti

College career
Years	Team	Apps	(Gls)
- Mercer County Community College

Managerial career
- 2015–2024: Cibao (assistant)
- 2024–: Cibao

Scheldeur Junior Sainvilus (born 28 November 1988) is a Haitian football manager who manages Cibao.

== Career ==
Sainvilus worked as a youth manager of Dominican Republic side Cibao and as manager of the club's reserve team, helping them win the league title.

Ahead of the 2015 season, Sainvilus was appointed as an assistant manager of Dominican Republic side Cibao, where he worked alongside Argentine manager Gabriel Martínez Poch and helped the club win four league titles.

Subsequently, he was appointed manager of Dominican Republic side Cibao in 2024, helping the club achieve second place at the 2024 CONCACAF Caribbean Cup and win the 2025 Copa Dominicana de Fútbol and the league title, becoming the first Haitian manager to win the Liga Dominicana de Fútbol.

== Personal life ==
Sainvilus was born on 28 November 1988 in Haiti and is a native of Mirebalais, Haiti and has siblings who have lived in the United States. Growing up, he attended Mercer County Community College in the United States. In 2009, he moved to Santiago, Dominican Republic.

Following his stint there, he attended the Pontificia Universidad Católica Madre y Maestra in the Dominican Republic, where he studied business administration.
