= Wilman Modesta =

Dominican football player

Personal information
- Date of birth: 24 December 1995 (age 30)
- Place of birth: Santo Domingo, Dominican Republic
- Height: 1.63 m (5 ft 4 in)
- Position: Midfielder

Team information
- Current team: Atlético Pantoja
- Number: 19

Senior career*
Years	Team	Apps	(Gls)
2015–2017	Barcelona Atlético		
2018–2021	O&M	22+	(0)
2022	Real Santa Cruz	27	(0)
2023	Atlético Pantoja	17	(0)
2024-	Cibao	40	(3)

International career^{‡}
2016–2021	Dominican Republic	20	(1)
- * Club domestic league appearances and goals as of 20 April 2026 ‡ National team caps and goals as of 5 June 2021

Wilman Modesta (born 24 December 1995) is a Dominican professional footballer who plays as a midfielder for Atlético Pantoja and the Dominican Republic national team.

== International career ==
Modesta made his formal debut for Dominican Republic on 5 October 2016, starting in a 0–4 loss win against Trinidad and Tobago. He had played a friendly match two months before against Puerto Rico, but it was not recognised by FIFA.

=== International goals ===
Scores and results list Dominican Republic's goal tally first

No.	Date	Venue	Opponent	Score	Result	Competition
1	25 March 2018	Estadio Cibao FC, Santiago de los Caballeros, Dominican Republic	Saint Kitts and Nevis	2–1	2–1	Friendly match
