= Yair Ibargüen =

Colombian footballer (born 1993)

Personal information
- Full name: Yair Andrés Ibargüen Murillo
- Date of birth: 3 May 1993 (age 33)
- Place of birth: Riosucio, Colombia
- Height: 1.82 m (6 ft 0 in)
- Position: Defender

Team information
- Current team: Atlántico

Youth career
- Ciclones de Cali

Senior career*
Years	Team	Apps	(Gls)
2013	Club Olimpia	1	(0)
2014–2016	3 de Febrero		
2016–2017	Boyacá Chicó	27	(1)
2017	Águila	4	(0)
2021	Atlántico		
2022	Jarabacoa		
2023–	Atlántico		

International career
2013	Colombia U20	1	(0)
- * Club domestic league appearances and goals as of 15:55, 9 December 2021 (UTC)

Yair Andrés Ibargüen Murillo (born 3 May 1993) is a Colombian footballer who currently plays as a defender for Liga Dominicana de Fútbol club Atlántico FC.

== Club career ==
Ibargüen made his debut with Paraguayan club Olimpia, on 5 May 2013 in a 4–3 victory against Sportivo Luqueño. He joined 3 de Febrero on loan in 2014. He joined relegation threatened Boyacá Chicó for the second half of the 2016 season. He played in the 1–1 draw against Atlético Nacional, which was Boyacá's first point of the tournament. On 6 November 2016, after a 3–2 defeat against Independiente Medellín, his team was relegated to Categoría Primera B.

On 9 July 2017, Ibargüen joined Salvadoran club CD Águila. After some poor performances in the CONCACAF League, Águila terminated his contract on 22 September 2017.

In 2021, Ibargüen joined Dominican club Atlántico for the upcoming season. On 7 March 2022, he joined rival Jarabacoa for the 2022 season. For the 2023 season, he returned to Atlántico.

== Career statistics ==
=== Club ===
As of 9 June 2019.

Club	Season	League			Cup		Continental		Other		Total	
Club	Season	Division	Apps	Goals	Apps	Goals	Apps	Goals	Apps	Goals	Apps	Goals
Club Olimpia	2013	Paraguayan Primera División	1	0	0	0	0	0	0	0	1	0
Boyacá Chicó	2016	Categoría Primera A	15	1	0	0	–		0	0	15	1
Boyacá Chicó	2017	Categoría Primera B	12	0	3 (Note: Appearances in the Copa Colombia)	0	–		0	0	15	0
Boyacá Chicó	Total		27	1	3	0	0	0	0	0	30	1
Águila	2017–18	Primera División de El Salvador	4	0	0	0	3 (Note: Appearances in the CONCACAF League)	0	0	0	7	0
Career total			32	1	3	0	3	0	0	0	38	1
