= Copa Dominicana de Futbol 2016 =

- Number of teams: 21
- Current champions: Cibao FC
- Website: ldf.com.do

The Copa Dominicana de Fútbol is the top tournament association football in the Dominican Republic. Created in 2015, it is open to all clubs and is affiliated with the Dominican Football Federation.

== Teams ==
=== Liga Dominicana de Fútbol ===
Atlético San Cristóbal	Bauger FC	Cibao FC	Club Atlético Pantoja
O&M FC

=== Semi-pro ===
Atlético FC	Bob Soccer FC	Campa FC	Cibao Atlético
Club 6 de Febrero	Club Atlético Dominguito	Deportivo Cóndor	Don Bosco FC
El Bien FC	Iberia FC	Los 30 de Villa Tapia	Realiste FC
Salcedo FC	Santiago Junior	UNEV FC	Unión VPN FC

== Group Phase ==
=== Metropolitan Zone ===
==== Group A ====
Team	Pld	W	D	L	GF	GA	GD	Pts	Qualification
O&M FC	3	2	1	0	9	5	+4	7	Cuartos de Final
Atlético San Cristóbal	3	2	0	1	8	3	+5	6	Repechaje
Club Atlético Dominguito	3	1	1	1	4	5	−1	4	
Campa FC	3	0	0	3	5	13	−8	0	

==== Group B ====
Team	Pld	W	D	L	GF	GA	GD	Pts	Qualification
Club Atlético Pantoja	2	2	0	0	18	0	+18	6	Cuartos de Final
Bob Soccer FC	2	1	0	1	4	3	+1	3	Repechaje
El Bien FC	2	0	0	2	0	19	−19	0	

==== Group C ====
Team	Pld	W	D	L	GF	GA	GD	Pts	Qualification
Bauger FC	2	1	1	0	2	1	+1	4	Cuartos de Final
UNEV FC	2	1	0	1	3	3	0	3	Repechaje
Atlético FC	2	0	1	1	3	4	−1	1	

=== North Zone ===
==== Group D ====
Team	Pld	W	D	L	GF	GA	GD	Pts	Qualification
Cibao Atlético	2	0	2	0	2	2	0	2	Cuartos de Final
Unión VPN FC	2	0	2	0	1	1	0	2	Repechaje
Los 30 de Villa Tapia	2	0	2	0	1	1	0	2	

==== Group E ====
Team	Pld	W	D	L	GF	GA	GD	Pts	Qualification
Club 6 de Febrero	2	2	0	0	5	2	+3	6	Cuartos de Final
Cibao FC	3	2	0	1	17	2	+15	6	Repechaje
Iberia FC	3	1	0	2	4	9	−5	3	
Realiste FC	2	0	0	2	1	14	−13	0	

==== Group F ====
Team	Pld	W	D	L	GF	GA	GD	Pts	Qualification
Don Bosco FC	3	2	1	0	9	5	+4	7	Cuartos de Final
Salcedo FC	3	1	2	0	9	6	+3	5	Repechaje
Santiago Junior	3	1	1	1	4	7	−3	3 (Note: 1 point deducted?)	
Deportivo Cóndor	3	0	1	2	5	9	−4	1	

== Second round ==
=== Metropolitan Zone ===
Team	Pld	W	D	L	GF	GA	GD	Pts	Qualification
Atlético San Cristóbal	1	1	0	0	3	1	+2	3	Cuartos de Final
Bob Soccer FC	2	1	0	1	5	5	0	3	
UNEV FC	1	0	0	1	2	4	−2	0	

=== North Zone ===
Team	Pld	W	D	L	GF	GA	GD	Pts	Qualification
Cibao FC	2	2	0	0	6	3	+3	6	Cuartos de Final
Unión VPN FC	1	0	0	1	1	2	−1	0	
Salcedo FC	1	0	0	1	2	4	−2	0	

== Finals ==
=== Quarter finals ===
Date: November 19 & 20

- Universidad O&M FC 2(4) vs 2(3)Club Atlético Pantoja
- Bauger FC 0 vs 4Atlético San Cristóbal
- Cibao Atletico 4 vs 2 Club 6 de Febrero
- Cibao FC 2 vs 1 Don Bosco FC

=== Semifinals ===
Date: November 24 & 26

- Universidad O&M FC 1 vs 2 Atlético San Cristóbal
- Universidad O&M FC 4(5) vs 1 (3)Atlético San Cristóbal
- Cibao Atletico 1 vs 4 Cibao FC
- Cibao Atletico 0(1) vs 3(7)Cibao FC

=== Final ===
Date: December 4

- Universidad O&M FC 0 vs 2 Cibao FC
