= Jean Carlos López =

Dominican footballer

Personal information
- Full name: Jean Carlos López Moscoso
- Date of birth: 9 November 1993 (age 33)
- Place of birth: Espaillat, Dominican Republic
- Height: 1.73 m (5 ft 8 in)
- Position: Midfielder

Team information
- Current team: Cibao
- Number: 14

Senior career*
Years	Team	Apps	(Gls)
2010–2015	Moca FC	?	(2+)
2016–2018	Atlético Pantoja	25+	(8+)
2019–2023	Cibao	66+	(13+)
2024	Real Santa Cruz	10	(1)
2024–	Cibao	41	(5)

International career^{‡}
2014–	Dominican Republic	74	(7)
- * Club domestic league appearances and goals as of 29 March 2026 ‡ National team caps and goals as of 1 October 2026

Jean Carlos López Moscoso (born 9 November 1993) is a Dominican professional footballer who plays as a midfielder for Liga DF club Cibao and the Dominican Republic national team.

He made an unofficial debut for the Dominican Republic in August 2013 versus Costa Rica in a friendly, which was not recognized on FIFA calendar. His first FIFA recognized match with the Dominican Republic came the following year, on 30 August 2014, against El Salvador.

In 2015, López was the only player from the 2015 MLS Caribbean Combine to be selected for the 2015 MLS SuperDraft.

== Career statistics ==
As of match played 1 October 2026

Appearances and goals by national team and year
National team	Year	Apps	Goals
Dominican Republic	2013	1	0
Dominican Republic	2014	7	0
Dominican Republic	2015	4	1
Dominican Republic	2016	6	0
Dominican Republic	2017	2	0
Dominican Republic	2018	5	1
Dominican Republic	2019	9	1
Dominican Republic	2020	0	0
Dominican Republic	2021	4	0
Dominican Republic	2022	5	2
Dominican Republic	2023	8	0
Dominican Republic	2024	10	2
Dominican Republic	2025	7	0
Dominican Republic	2026	6	0
Total		74	7

Scores and results list Dominican Republic's goal tally first, score column indicates score after each López goal.

List of international goals scored by Jean Carlos López
No.	Date	Venue	Opponent	Score	Result	Competition
1	13 March 2015	Estadio Cibao, Santiago de los Caballeros, Dominican Republic	Cayman Islands	2–0	6–0	Friendly
2	8 September 2018	Ergilio Hato Stadium, Willemstad, Curaçao	Bonaire	4–0	5–0	2019–20 CONCACAF Nations League qualification
3	12 October 2019	Estadio Olímpico Félix Sánchez, Santo Domingo, Dominican Republic	Saint Lucia	1–0	3–0	2019–20 CONCACAF Nations League B
4	2 June 2022	FFB Stadium, Belmopan, Belize	Belize	1–0	2–0	2022–23 CONCACAF Nations League B
5	5 June 2022	Estadio Olímpico Félix Sánchez, Santo Domingo, Dominican Republic	French Guiana	2–1	2–3	2022–23 CONCACAF Nations League B
6	26 March 2024	Estadio Monumental "U", Lima, Peru	Peru	1–3	1–4	Friendly
7	19 November 2024	Estadio Cibao FC, Santiago, Dominican Republic	Bermuda	3–1	6–1	2024–25 CONCACAF Nations League B
