= 2020 Caribbean Club Championship =

2020 CONCACAF Caribbean Club Championship
Tournament details
- Host country: Group stage: Jamaica; Final stage: Dominican Republic
- Dates: Group stage: 29 January – 9 February 2020; Final stage: Cancelled (originally 8–13 May 2020)
- Teams: 6 (from 3 associations)

Tournament statistics
- Matches played: 6
- Goals scored: 12 (2 per match)
- Top scorer: (Haiti) Nerlin Saint-Vil (3 goals)

The 2020 Caribbean Club Championship (officially the 2020 Flow CONCACAF Caribbean Club Championship for sponsorship reasons) was the 22nd edition of the Caribbean Club Championship (also known as the CFU Club Championship), the first-tier annual international club football competition in the Caribbean region, held amongst clubs whose football associations are affiliated with the Caribbean Football Union (CFU), a sub-confederation of CONCACAF.

The winners of the 2020 CONCACAF Caribbean Club Championship would qualify to the 2021 CONCACAF Champions League, the second and third place teams would qualify to the 2020 CONCACAF League, while the fourth place team would play against the winners of the 2020 CONCACAF Caribbean Club Shield in a playoff match to determine the final Caribbean spot to the 2020 CONCACAF League. However, as the final stage of the tournament was cancelled due to the COVID-19 pandemic, the results in the group stage were used to determine the teams which qualified for the 2021 CONCACAF Champions League and the 2020 CONCACAF League.

Portmore United were the title holders, but were eliminated in the group stage.

== Teams ==
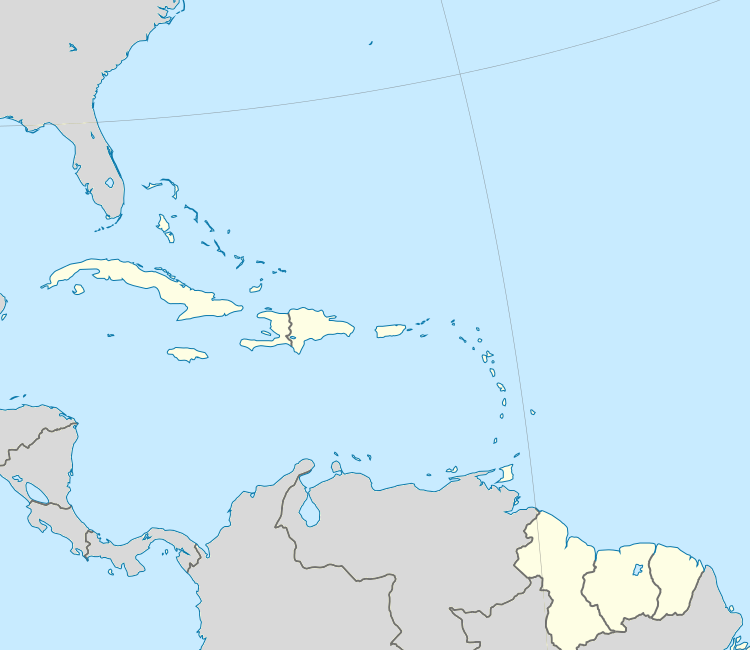
Location of teams of the 2020 CONCACAF Caribbean Club Championship
(H) Group stage host.

Among the 31 CFU member associations, four of them were classified as professional leagues and each may enter two teams in the CONCACAF Caribbean Club Championship. However, one association was not allowed to enter this season, and as a result, only six teams from three associations entered the 2020 CONCACAF Caribbean Club Championship.

Association	Team	Qualification method
Dominican Republic	Atlético Pantoja	2019 Liga Dominicana de Fútbol grand final winners
Dominican Republic	Cibao	2019 Liga Dominicana de Fútbol aggregate table best team not yet qualified
Haiti	Don Bosco	2018 Ligue Haïtienne Série de Clôture champions
Haiti	Arcahaie	2019 Ligue Haïtienne Série d'Ouverture champions
Jamaica	Portmore United	2018–19 National Premier League champions
Jamaica	Waterhouse	2018–19 National Premier League runners-up

Associations not allowed to enter

- Trinidad and Tobago
  - The two teams from Trinidad and Tobago, W Connection (2018 TT Pro League champions) and Central (2018 TT Pro League runners-up), were not allowed to compete in the 2020 CONCACAF Caribbean Club Championship as the association did not properly execute its club licensing programme.

== Group stage ==
The draw for the group stage was held on 4 December 2019, 10:00 EST (UTC−5), at the CONCACAF Headquarters in Miami, United States. The six teams were drawn into two groups of three. The two group stage hosts from Jamaica, Waterhouse and Portmore United, were placed in Pot 1 and assigned to Groups A and B respectively. The two teams from the Dominican Republic were placed in Pot 2, while the two teams from Haiti were placed in Pot 3. This ensured that teams from the same association could not be drawn into the same group.

Pot 1 (hosts)	Pot 2	Pot 3
(Jamaica) Waterhouse (Group A); (Jamaica) Portmore United (Group B)	(Dominican Republic) Atlético Pantoja; (Dominican Republic) Cibao	(Haiti) Arcahaie; (Haiti) Don Bosco

The group stage was played between 29 January – 9 February 2020, at the Anthony Spaulding Sports Complex in Kingston, Jamaica. All times local, EST (UTC−5).

Tiebreakers

The ranking of teams in each group is determined as follows (Regulations Article 12.1):

1. Points obtained in all group matches (three points for a win, one for a draw, zero for a loss);
2. Goal difference in all group matches;
3. Number of goals scored in all group matches;
4. Points obtained in the matches played between the teams in question;
5. Goal difference in the matches played between the teams in question;
6. Number of goals scored in the matches played between the teams in question;
7. Fair play points in all group matches (only one deduction could be applied to a player in a single match):
  - Yellow card: −1 points;
  - Indirect red card (second yellow card): −3 points;
  - Direct red card: −4 points;
  - Yellow card and direct red card: −5 points;
8. Drawing of lots.

=== Group A ===
Pos	Team	Pld	W	D	L	GF	GA	GD	Pts	Qualification
1	(Jamaica) Waterhouse (H)	2	1	1	0	3	0	+3	4	Final stage
2	(Dominican Republic) Cibao	2	0	2	0	1	1	0	2	Final stage
3	(Haiti) Don Bosco	2	0	1	1	1	4	−3	1	

Source: CONCACAF
Rules for classification: Tiebreakers
(H) Hosts
29 January 2020
19:00

Waterhouse (Jamaica)	0–0	(Dominican Republic) Cibao
	Report

Anthony Spaulding Sports Complex, Kingston
Referee: Ben Whitty (Cayman Islands)

31 January 2020
15:00

Cibao (Dominican Republic)	1–1	(Haiti) Don Bosco
Marisi 7'	Report	Aciar 62' (o.g.)

Anthony Spaulding Sports Complex, Kingston
Referee: Rubiel Vazquez (United States)

2 February 2020
18:00

Waterhouse (Jamaica)	3–0	(Haiti) Don Bosco
Thomas 17', 66'; Williams 37'	Report

Anthony Spaulding Sports Complex, Kingston
Referee: Ricangel de Leça (Aruba)

=== Group B ===
Pos	Team	Pld	W	D	L	GF	GA	GD	Pts	Qualification
1	(Dominican Republic) Atlético Pantoja	2	2	0	0	6	0	+6	6	Final stage
2	(Haiti) Arcahaie	2	1	0	1	1	2	−1	3	Final stage
3	(Jamaica) Portmore United (H)	2	0	0	2	0	5	−5	0	

Source: CONCACAF
Rules for classification: Tiebreakers
(H) Hosts
5 February 2020
19:00

Portmore United (Jamaica)	0–4	(Dominican Republic) Atlético Pantoja
	Report	Saint-Vil 4', 82'; Ozuna 37'; Espinal 90'

Anthony Spaulding Sports Complex, Kingston
Referee: Erick Lezama (Nicaragua)

7 February 2020
15:00

Atlético Pantoja (Dominican Republic)	2–0	(Haiti) Arcahaie
Saint-Vil 80' (pen.); Ossa 90+4'	Report

Anthony Spaulding Sports Complex, Kingston
Referee: Diego Montaño Robles (Mexico)

9 February 2020
18:00

Portmore United (Jamaica)	0–1	(Haiti) Arcahaie
	Report	Beldor 85'

Anthony Spaulding Sports Complex, Kingston
Referee: Kimbell Ward (Saint Kitts and Nevis)

== Final stage ==
The final stage was originally scheduled to be played between 8–13 May 2020, at the Estadio Olímpico Félix Sánchez in Santo Domingo, Dominican Republic. On 3 April 2020, CONCACAF announced the suspension of the final stage due to the COVID-19 pandemic, with the new dates to be confirmed later. On 7 August 2020, they provided an update on the final stage of the tournament, where they would make a final decision by the end of August to determine if it could be resumed towards the end of September. On 25 August 2020, CONCACAF announced that as it was impossible to organize the tournament in September in order to provide qualification for the 2020 CONCACAF League which would start in October, the final stage was cancelled.

All times local, AST (UTC−4).

=== Bracket ===
The semi-final matchups were planned to be:

- SF1: Group A Winners vs. Group B Runners-up
- SF2: Group B Winners vs. Group A Runners-up

The winners of SF1 and SF2 would play in the final, while the losers of SF1 and SF2 would play in the third place match. The losers of the third place match and the CONCACAF Caribbean Club Shield winners would play in the CONCACAF League playoff.

Semi-finals
8 May
(Jamaica) Waterhouse	C
(Haiti) Arcahaie	C
8 May
(Dominican Republic) Atlético Pantoja	C
(Dominican Republic) Cibao	C

Final
10 May
Semi-final 1 Winners	C
(Dominican Republic) Semi-final 2 Winners	C
Third place match
10 May
Semi-final 1 Losers	C
(Dominican Republic) Semi-final 2 Losers	C

CONCACAF League playoff
13 May
Club Championship 4th place	C
Club Shield Winners	C

=== Semi-finals ===
8 May 2020
18:00

Waterhouse (Jamaica)	Cancelled	(Haiti) Arcahaie
	Report

Estadio Olímpico Félix Sánchez, Santo Domingo

8 May 2020
20:30

Atlético Pantoja (Dominican Republic)	Cancelled	(Dominican Republic) Cibao
	Report

Estadio Olímpico Félix Sánchez, Santo Domingo

=== Third place match ===
Winners would qualify for 2020 CONCACAF League preliminary round. Losers would advance to CONCACAF League playoff against 2020 CONCACAF Caribbean Club Shield winners for a place in 2020 CONCACAF League preliminary round, as long as the Shield winners comply with the minimum CONCACAF Club Licensing requirements for the CONCACAF League.

10 May 2020
18:00

Semi-final 1 Losers	Cancelled	(Dominican Republic) Semi-final 2 Losers
	Report

Estadio Olímpico Félix Sánchez, Santo Domingo

=== Final ===
Winners would qualify for 2021 CONCACAF Champions League. Losers would qualify for 2020 CONCACAF League round of 16.

10 May 2020
20:30

Semi-final 1 Winners	Cancelled	(Dominican Republic) Semi-final 2 Winners
	Report

Estadio Olímpico Félix Sánchez, Santo Domingo

=== CONCACAF League playoff ===
The CONCACAF League playoff would be played between the 2020 CONCACAF Caribbean Club Championship fourth-placed team and the 2020 CONCACAF Caribbean Club Shield winners, as long as the Shield winners comply with the minimum CONCACAF Club Licensing requirements for the CONCACAF League, with the winners qualifying for the 2020 CONCACAF League preliminary round.

13 May 2020
19:00

Club Championship 4th place	Cancelled	Club Shield Winners
	Report

Estadio Olímpico Félix Sánchez, Santo Domingo

== Top goalscorers ==
Team eliminated or inactive for this round.

Rank	Player	Team	Goals	By round		
Rank	Player	Team	Goals	G1	G2	G3
1	(Haiti) Nerlin Saint-Vil	(Dominican Republic) Atlético Pantoja	3	2	1	
2	(Jamaica) Rafeik Thomas	(Jamaica) Waterhouse	2			2
3	(Haiti) Marc Beldor	(Haiti) Arcahaie	1			1
3	(Dominican Republic) Luis Espinal	(Dominican Republic) Atlético Pantoja	1	1		
3	(Argentina) Pablo Marisi	(Dominican Republic) Cibao	1		1	
3	(Colombia) Alexis Ossa	(Dominican Republic) Atlético Pantoja	1		1	
3	(Dominican Republic) Erick Ozuna	(Dominican Republic) Atlético Pantoja	1	1		
3	(Jamaica) Stephen Williams	(Jamaica) Waterhouse	1			1

== Qualification to CONCACAF Champions League and CONCACAF League ==
Qualified teams from 2020 Caribbean club competitions
- CONCACAF Champions League: (Dominican Republic) Atlético Pantoja
- CONCACAF League: (Jamaica) Waterhouse (Haiti) Arcahaie (Dominican Republic) Cibao

Due to the cancellation of the 2020 CONCACAF Caribbean Club Shield and the final stage of the 2020 CONCACAF Caribbean Club Championship, qualification of teams from the Caribbean for the 2021 CONCACAF Champions League and the 2020 CONCACAF League was determined by the results of the group stage of the 2020 CONCACAF Caribbean Club Championship.

Pos	Grp	Team	Pld	W	D	L	GF	GA	GD	Pts	Qualification
1	B	(Dominican Republic) Atlético Pantoja	2	2	0	0	6	0	+6	6	2021 CONCACAF Champions League
2	A	(Jamaica) Waterhouse	2	1	1	0	3	0	+3	4	2020 CONCACAF League round of 16
3	B	(Haiti) Arcahaie	2	1	0	1	1	2	−1	3	2020 CONCACAF League preliminary round
4	A	(Dominican Republic) Cibao	2	0	2	0	1	1	0	2	2020 CONCACAF League preliminary round
5	A	(Haiti) Don Bosco	2	0	1	1	1	4	−3	1	
6	B	(Jamaica) Portmore United	2	0	0	2	0	5	−5	0	

Source: CONCACAF

== See also ==
- 2020 Caribbean Club Shield
- 2020 CONCACAF League
- 2021 CONCACAF Champions League
