= Ernesto Trinidad =

Dominican footballer

Personal information
- Full name: Ernesto Chet Trinidad Reyes
- Date of birth: 2 January 1996 (age 30)
- Place of birth: Moca, Dominican Republic
- Height: 1.73 m (5 ft 8 in)
- Position: Defender

Team information
- Current team: Cibao
- Number: 22

Senior career*
Years	Team	Apps	(Gls)
2014–2015	Moca		
2016–2018	Cibao		
2019-2022	Pantoja	38	(2)
2022	Moca	14	(0)
2023-	Cibao	100	(6)

International career^{‡}
2016–	Dominican Republic	10	(0)
- * Club domestic league appearances and goals as of 29 March 2026 ‡ National team caps and goals as of 21 March 2025

Ernesto Chet Trinidad Reyes (born 2 January 1996) is a Dominican professional footballer who plays as a defender for Liga DF club Atlético Pantoja and the Dominican Republic national team.

== Honours ==
- Cibao
  - CFU Club Championship (1): 2017
