= Charles Hérold Jr. =

Haitian footballer (born 1990)

Charles Hérold
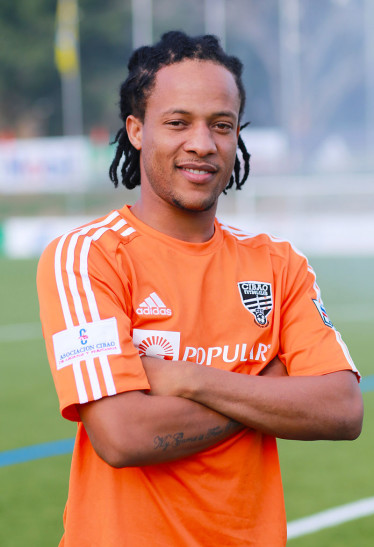

Personal information
- Full name: Charles Hérold Junior
- Date of birth: 23 July 1990 (age 36)
- Place of birth: Gonaïves, Haiti
- Position: Right winger

Team information
- Current team: Cibao FC
- Number: 10

Youth career
- –2009: Tempête FC

Senior career*
Years	Team	Apps	(Gls)
2009–2015	Tempête FC	12+	(2+)
2015–2024	Cibao FC	98+	(36+)
2025-	O&M FC	9	(2)

International career
2010–2019	Haiti	29	(4)
- * Club domestic league appearances and goals as of 9 February 2014

Charles Hérold Jr. (born 23 July 1990) is a Haitian footballer who plays as a right winger for Cibao FC in the Liga Dominicana de Fútbol.

== Career statistics ==
=== International ===
Appearances and goals by national team and year
National team	Year	Apps	Goals
Haiti	2010	2	0
Haiti	2011	6	0
Haiti	2012	–	
Haiti	2013	5	1
Haiti	2014	–	
Haiti	2015	–	
Haiti	2016	4	0
Haiti	2017	4	1
Haiti	2018	3	2
Haiti	2019	5	0
Total		29	4

Scores and results list Haiti's goal tally first, score column indicates score after each Hérold goal.

List of international goals scored by Charles Hérold Jr.
No.	Date	Venue	Opponent	Score	Result	Competition
1	24 March 2013	Estadio Panamericano, San Cristóbal, Dominican Republic	Dominican Republic	1–3	1–3	Friendly
2	6 January 2017	Ato Boldon Stadium, Couva, Trinidad and Tobago	Suriname	1–0	4–2	2017 CONCACAF Gold Cup qualification
3	10 September 2018	Stade Sylvio Cator, Port-au-Prince, Haiti	Sint Maarten	6–0	13–0	2019–20 CONCACAF Nations League qualification
4	16 October 2018	Stade Pierre Aliker, Fort de France, Martinique	Saint Lucia	2–0	2–1	2019–20 CONCACAF Nations League qualification

== Honours ==
=== Club ===
- Cibao
  - CFU Club Championship (1): 2017

=== Individual ===
- Ballon d'Or Haïtien (1): 2011
