= Richard Dabas =

Dominican footballer

Personal information
- Full name: Richard Joel Dabas Pérez
- Date of birth: 4 August 1994 (age 32)
- Place of birth: Moca, Dominican Republic
- Height: 1.83 m (6 ft 0 in)
- Position: Midfielder

Team information
- Current team: Cibao
- Number: 4

Senior career*
Years	Team	Apps	(Gls)
2012–2016	Moca		
2017–2020	Cibao		
2021-	Moca	88	(7)

International career^{‡}
2015–2023	Dominican Republic	15	(0)
- * Club domestic league appearances and goals as of 22 February 2025 ‡ National team caps and goals as of 22 February 2025

Richard Joel Dabas Pérez (born 4 August 1994) is a Dominican footballer who plays as a midfielder for Cibao FC in the Liga Dominicana de Fútbol.

He scored the winning goal in the 2017 CFU Club Championship final.

== Career statistics ==
Club	Season	League	
Club	Season	Apps	Goals
Moca	2012–13	7	0
Moca	2014	?	?
Moca	2015	?	2
Moca	2016	?	0
Moca	Total	7+	2+
Cibao	2017	0	0
Cibao	Total	0	0
Career total		7+	2+

== Honours ==
- Cibao
  - CFU Club Championship (1): 2017
