= Anderson Arias =

Venezuelan footballer (born 1987)

Personal information
- Full name: Anderson Arias Zambrano
- Date of birth: 20 April 1987 (age 39)
- Place of birth: San Cristóbal, Venezuela
- Height: 1.76 m (5 ft 9 in)
- Position: Striker

Team information
- Current team: Atlético Pantoja

Senior career*
| Years | Team | Apps | (Gls) |
| 2006–2012 | Deportivo Táchira | 130 | (27) |
| 2010 | → Zulia (loan) | 14 | (7) |
| 2012–2014 | Real Esppor | 30 | (5) |
| 2014 | Monagas | 17 | (11) |
| 2015 | Margarita | 18 | (5) |
| 2015 | Atlántico | 12 | (7) |
| 2016 | Barcelona Atlético | 20 | (11) |
| 2017 | Universidad O&M | 17 | (5) |
| 2018 | Atlético San Francisco | 21 | (12) |
| 2019 | Atlántico | 18 | (9) |
| 2020– | Atlético Pantoja | 0 | (0) |

International career
| 2007 | Venezuela U20 | 4 | (0) |
| 2007 | Venezuela | 1 | (0) |
- * Club domestic league appearances and goals as of 30 November 2020

Anderson Arias Zambrano (born 20 April 1987) is a Venezuelan professional footballer who plays as a striker for Dominican club Atlético Pantoja.

== Early life ==
Arias was born in San Cristóbal, in Venezuela's Táchira state.

== Club career ==
Arias began his career with Venezuelan Primera División side Deportivo Táchira, scoring 27 goals in 130 career appearances. While on loan with Zulia in 2010, he scored seven goals in fourteen appearances.

== International career ==
In 2007, Arias made four appearances for the Venezuelan U20 team. On 22 August 2007, Arias made his debut for the senior team against Paraguay.
