= Ismael Díaz (footballer, born 1990) =

Dominican footballer

Ismael Díaz Gayson
Personal information
- Full name: Luis Ismael Díaz Ramírez
- Date of birth: 21 August 1990 (age 36)
- Place of birth: Santo Domingo, Dominican Republic
- Height: 1.78 m (5 ft 10 in)
- Positions: Fullback; central defender

Team information
- Current team: Cibao
- Number: 5

Youth career
- Campamento 16 de Agosto
- Bob Soccer School

Senior career*
Years	Team	Apps	(Gls)
2014	Bob Soccer School		
2015–2017	Barcelona Atlético		
2018	O&M		
2019–2024	Cibao	93	(5)
2024-2026	Pantoja	77	(4)
2026-	Cibao	4	(0)

International career
2014–2023	Dominican Republic	33	(1)
- * Club domestic league appearances and goals as of 9 September 2026

Luis Ismael Díaz Ramírez Gayson (born 21 August 1990), nicknamed Pinta, is a Dominican footballer who plays for Cibao FC and the Dominican Republic national team as a fullback.

== Club career ==
Born in Santo Domingo, Díaz is a product of the Bob Soccer School FC, playing for its first team in the extinct Liga Mayor. In 2015, when the new league (Liga Dominicana de Fútbol) was created which Bob Soccer is not part, Díaz moved to Club Barcelona Atlético (former Barcelona FC).

== International career ==
Díaz made his international debut for Dominican Republic on 7 September 2014, starting in a 10–0 win against Anguilla for the 2017 Caribbean Cup qualification.

== Career statistics ==
=== International ===
Appearances and goals by national team and year
National team	Year	Apps	Goals
Dominican Republic	2014	4	0
Dominican Republic	2015	4	0
Dominican Republic	2016	5	0
Dominican Republic	2017	2	0
Dominican Republic	2018	3	1
Dominican Republic	2019	7	0
Dominican Republic	2020	–	
Dominican Republic	2021	2	0
Dominican Republic	2022	2	0
Dominican Republic	2023	4	0
Total		33	1

Scores and results list the Dominican Republic's goal tally first, score column indicates score after each Díaz goal.

List of international goals scored by Ismael Díaz
No.	Date	Venue	Opponent	Score	Result	Competition
1	22 March 2018	Estadio Olímpico Félix Sánchez, Santo Domingo, Dominican Republic	Turks and Caicos Islands	1–0	4–0	Friendly
