= Alessandro Baroni =

Dominican footballer (born 1999)

Personal information
- Full name: Alessandro Franly Baroni Vásquez
- Date of birth: 14 August 1999 (age 27)
- Place of birth: Santo Domingo, Dominican Republic
- Height: 1.80 m (5 ft 11 in)
- Position: Goalkeeper

Team information
- Current team: Atlético Pantoja
- Number: 1

Youth career
- Boavista

Senior career*
Years	Team	Apps	(Gls)
2017-2018	Boavista B	0	(0)
2019–2023	O&M	90	(0)
2024–	Atlético Pantoja	52	(0)

International career
2018	Dominican Republic U20	4	(0)
2020	Dominican Republic U23	1	(0)
2022-	Dominican Republic	1	(0)
- * Club domestic league appearances and goals

Alessandro Franly Baroni Vásquez (born 14 August 1999) is a Dominican professional footballer who plays as a goalkeeper for Liga DF club Atlético Pantoja and the Dominican Republic national team.

== Career ==
Baroni started his career with the reserves of Portuguese top flight side Boavista.

Before the 2019 season, he signed for O&M in the Dominican Republic.
