= Dominican football =

Dominican football may refer to:

- Football in the Dominican Republic
- Football in Dominica
