= Edward Acevedo (footballer) =

Dominican footballer and manager (born 1985)

Personal information
- Full name: Edward Arturo Acevedo Cruz
- Date of birth: 10 December 1985 (age 40)
- Place of birth: Santo Domingo, Dominican Republic
- Height: 1.63 m (5 ft 4 in)
- Position: Left back

Team information
- Current team: Dominican Republic U-23 (manager)

Senior career*
Years	Team	Apps	(Gls)
2006–2009	Atlético Barcelona	32	(3)
2007	Don Bosco	8	(2)
2009	FK Crvenka	14	(3)
2009–2010	FK Veternik	24	(3)
2010–2012	FK Modriča	32	(0)
2012–2013	FK Rudar Prijedor	24	(1)
2013–2014	FK Sloga Doboj	28	(2)
2014–2015	FK Tekstilac Derventa	9	(1)
2015–2018	Cibao FC	31	(0)
Total		202	(15)

International career^{‡}
2008–2014	Dominican Republic	15	(0)

Managerial career
- 2020–2021: Delfines del Este
- 20??–2023: Atlético Vega Real
- 2023-: Dominican Republic U-23
- * Club domestic league appearances and goals as of 18 August 2014 ‡ National team caps and goals as of 3 October 2018

Edward Arturo Acevedo Cruz (born 10 December 1985) is a Dominican football former player and current manager. He played as a full-back and has represented the Dominican Republic national team. Nicknamed Beba, he currently manages Liga Dominicana de Fútbol club Atlético Vega Real.

== Club career ==
Born on 10 December 1985, in Santo Domingo, Acevedo played with Santo Domingo's Club Barcelona Atlético. He had a spell in Haiti with Don Bosco FC before moving to Europe along his club and national team colleague Kerbi Rodríguez and join Serbian side FK Crvenka. In summer 2009, he moved and signed with FK Veternik a side playing in the Serbian League Vojvodina. In summer 2010, he and Kerbi moved to neighboring Bosnia and Herzegovina, more precisely to the administrative division of Republika Srpska, to play on loan with FK Modriča in the First League of the Republika Srpska.

In summer 2012, Acevedo joined FK Rudar Prijedor and played in the 2012–13 Premier League of Bosnia and Herzegovina. In July 2013, he moved to FK Sloga Doboj, playing in the First League of the Republika Srpska, Bosnian second tier.

In summer 2014, Acevedo joined FK Tekstilac Derventa, a newly promoted club to the First League of Rep. Srpska. He made history in the club as he scored their first goal after the return to the Rep. Srpska first level. He finished the season by making 9 league appearances and scoring one goal.

== International career ==
Acevedo has been a member of the Dominican national team since 2008. He was part of the team in the 2010 FIFA World Cup qualifications.

== Honours ==
Atlético Barcelona

- Primera División de Republica Dominicana: 2007

Cibao

- CFU Club Championship: 2017

== External sources ==
- Edward Acevedo – FIFA competition record (archived)
- Edward Acevedo at National-Football-Teams.com
- 2010-11 stats at BiHsoccer
