= José Valerio =

Dominican footballer

Personal information
- Full name: José Óscar Valerio Mendoza
- Date of birth: 9 June 1987 (age 39)
- Place of birth: La Vega, Dominican Republic
- Height: 1.73 m (5 ft 8 in)
- Position: Midfielder

Team information
- Current team: Atlético Vega Real

Senior career*
Years	Team	Apps	(Gls)
2015–	Atlético Vega Real		

International career^{‡}
2015–	Dominican Republic	2	(0)
- * Club domestic league appearances and goals ‡ National team caps and goals as of 22 March 2018

José Óscar Valerio Mendoza (born 9 June 1987) is a Dominican footballer who plays as a midfielder for Atlético Vega Real and the Dominican Republic national team.

== International career ==
Valerio made his international debut for Dominican Republic on 25 March 2015, being a second-half substitute in a 0–3 friendly loss against Cuba.
