= Orlando Capellino =

Uruguayan football coach

Personal information
- Full name: Orlando Capellino Arenas
- Date of birth: 17 April 1958 (age 68)
- Place of birth: Uruguay

Managerial career
- Years: Team
- 2008: Deportivo Maldonado
- 2009: Plaza Colonia
- 2015–2017: Atlético Pantoja
- 2017–2019: Dominican Republic

Orlando Capellino Arenas (born on 17 April 1958), is a Uruguayan football coach, who was most recently manager of the Dominican Republic.

== Managerial career ==
In his native Uruguay, Capellino managed Deportivo Maldonado and Plaza Colonia.

In 2015, Capellino was appointed manager of Atlético Pantoja in the Dominican Republic. In Capellino's first season at the club, Atlético Pantoja won the 2015 Liga Dominicana de Fútbol.

In 2017, Capellino became manager of the Dominican Republic.

In 2022, he is currently the coach of the Colonia soccer team (department of Uruguay). Selection that will play the OFI national team tournament.

== Managerial Statistics ==
As of Match played 24 March 2019

| Team | From | To | Record | | | | |
| Team | From | To | G | W | D | L | Win % |
|---|---|---|---|---|---|---|---|
| Dominican Republic | 2017 | 2019 | 6 | 4 | 1 | 1 | 66.67 |
