= Estadio Parque del Este =

Soccer stadium in Dominican Republic

Coordinates: 18.4790°N 69.8543°W

Estadio Panamericano Parque Este
- Interactive map of Estadio Panamericano Parque Este
- Location: Santo Domingo Este, Santo Domingo, Dominican Republic
- Operator: FEDOFUTBOL
- Capacity: 1,000
- Surface: grass

Construction
- Groundbreaking: 2002
- Opened: 2003 (Renovated 2022)

Tenants
- Club Barcelona Atlético (2015–2020); Delfines del Este (2015-)

Estadio Panamericano Parque Este is a soccer stadium in Santo Domingo Este, Dominican Republic. It is currently used for football matches, hosting the home games of the Delfines del Este of Liga Dominicana de Futbol.

Up until the 2019 season Club Barcelona Atletico were tenants, but were relegated to the 2nd division (now known as Liga Dominicana de Fútbol Expansión) after failing to compile the required points to advance in the standings.

On 8 May, 2022, the stadium was officially reopened after a much-needed renovation phase operated by the Dominican Soccer Federation. The renovation included a new drainage and irrigation system, Bermuda type- grass, among other improvements.
