= Walon Sport =

Textile and sportswear company in Peru

Walon
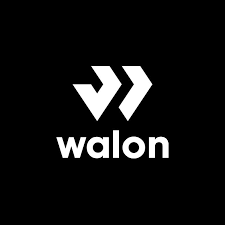
- Company type: Joint-stock company
- Industry: Sportswear, Textile
- Founded: 1989; 37 years ago in Lima
- Headquarters: Lima, Peru
- Products: Sportswear; Balls; Accessories
- Website: www.walon.com.pe

Walon Sport, or simply Walon, is a multinational textile business founded in 1989 in Peru. It is one of the principal sportswear manufacturers in Peru, and it provides the kits for various association football clubs in the Peruvian first division. The company further expanded its production when it acquired deals with clubs in the Colombian Categoría Primera A.

Walon Sport was the sponsor of the Peru national football team from 1998 to 2010.

The company was founded in 1989 by the husband and wife team of Alfonso Gilio and Ery Camones. Within five years, they opened the first Walon Sport store in Barranca.

== Football clubs sponsored ==
Bolivia

- Universitario de Sucre (since 2015 season)

Colombia

- Deportes Quindío
- Patriotas F.C. (since 2013 season)

Dominican Republic

- Atlético Pantoja
- Moca FC

Peru

- Cusco
- León de Huánuco
- Universidad César Vallejo
- Alianza Atletico
- Atlético Grau
- Atlético Minero
- Melgar
- Colegio Nacional de Iquitos
- Los Caimanes
- Total Chalaco

Sweden

- Amauta
