= Copa Dominicana de Fútbol =

Copa Dominicana de Futbol
- Founded: 2015
- Region: Dominican Republic
- Teams: varies
- Current champions: Cibao FC
- Most championships: Cibao FC (3)
- 2025

The Copa Dominicana de Futbol is the top football tournament in the Dominican Republic. Created in 2015, it is open to all clubs and is affiliated with the Dominican Football Federation.

== Tournament ==
- 2015 : Cibao FC
- 2016 : Cibao FC
- 2025 : Cibao FC

== Top goalscorers ==
Year	Name	Club	Goals
2015	(Dominican Republic) Jonathan Faña	Cibao FC	15
2016			
2025	(Colombia) Rivaldo Correa	Cibao FC	9
