= Gabriel Martínez Poch =

Argentine football manager (born 1965)

Personal information
- Full name: Gabriel Claudio Martínez Poch
- Date of birth: 10 February 1965 (age 61)
- Place of birth: La Plata, Argentina
- Height: 1.84 m (6 ft 0 in)

Managerial career
- Years: Team
- 2019: Mineros (assistant)
- 2022: Mineros
- 2023–2024: Cibao

Gabriel Claudio Martínez Poch (born 10 February 1965) is an Argentine football coach.

== Career ==
Martínez Poch was born in La Plata. After beginning his career with hometown side Estudiantes de La Plata in 2000, he worked as a fitness coach for several Argentine clubs, as well in Spain (with UD San Pedro), Bolivia (with Blooming, Jorge Wilstermann, Aurora and Real Potosí), Ecuador (Deportivo Quito, Macará and Independiente del Valle), Romania (Universitatea Craiova), Kuwait (Al-Tadamon) and Qatar (Qatar SC).

Ahead of the 2019 season, Martínez Poch was named Horacio Matuszyczk's assistant at Venezuelan side Mineros de Guayana, but left the club in January of that year due to their financial problems, and was named Head Fitness Coach at Major League Soccer side New England Revolution. He later also worked as an under-19 coach of the club.

On 5 January 2022, Martínez Poch returned to Mineros after being named first team manager. His first professional match in charge occurred on 26 February, a 1–3 home loss against Monagas.

On 7 April 2022, Martínez Poch resigned from Mineros after just six matches. In May, he returned to his home country after joining Rubén Darío Insúa's staff at San Lorenzo, as a fitness coach.

== Personal life ==
Martínez Poch's brother Cristian is a convicted criminal for keeping his partner under false imprisonment, aside from drugging and slandering her and sexually assaulting her daughters.

== Honours ==
Cibao

- Liga Dominicana de Fútbol: 2023
