= Bauger FC =

Association football club in Dominican Republic

- Full name: Bauger Fútbol Club
- Nickname(s): La Escuela
- Founded: 20 July 1986; 39 years ago, as Escuela Bauger
- Ground: Estadio Olímpico Félix Sánchez
- Capacity: 27,000
- Chairman: Jorge Rolando Bauger
- Manager: Jorge Allen Bauger
- League: Liga Dominicana de Fútbol
Home colours	Away colours

Bauger FC was a professional football team based in Santo Domingo, Dominican Republic. Founded in 1986 by Jorge Rolando Bauger as Escuela Bauger, the team changed its name to Bauger FC in 2010. Bauger FC currently plays as an amateur club in the Liga Dominicana de Fútbol's Expansion.

It was founded in 1989 as the School of Soccer of Jorge Rolando Bauger by the Argentine Jorge Rolando Bauger.

== Notable players ==
- (Cuba) Jorge Luis Clavelo (2016–)
- (Dominican Republic) Darly Batista (2012–13)
- (Dominican Republic) Jonathan Faña (2015)
- (Dominican Republic) Gonzalo Frechilla (2009)
- (Dominican Republic) César García (2015)
- (Dominican Republic) Ernesto Jiménez (2009)
- (Haiti) Bony Pierre (2015–)
