= Banreservas =

State-owned bank in Dominican Republic

Banco de Reservas de la República Dominicana - Banco Múltiple, S.A.

- Banreservas HQ, "Torre Banreservas" in 2024
- Trade name: Banreservas
- Native name: Banco de Reservas de la República Dominicana - Banco Múltiple, S. A.
- Type: State-owned enterprise
- Industry: Banking and financial services
- Founded: October 24, 1941; 85 years ago
- Headquarters: 18°28′05″N 69°56′19″W; Avenida Winston Churchill, esquina Calle Porfirio Herrera, Piantini, Santo Domingo, Distrito Nacional, 10148, Dominican Republic
- Area served: Dominican Republic and its offices in Madrid, Miami and New York City
- Key people: Leonardo Aguilera (Executive President)
- Products: Savings accounts, checking accounts, credit cards, debit cards, retail banking, commercial banking, investment banking, mortgage loans and online banking
- Net income: RD$25.45 billion (2025)
- Total assets: RD$1.53 trillion (September 2026)
- Owner: Dominican state
- Number of employees: 12,906 (2026)
- Subsidiaries: Seguros Reservas; AFP Reservas; ARS Reservas; Fiduciaria Reservas; AFI Reservas; Inversiones & Reservas; Inmobiliaria Reservas
- Website: www.banreservas.com (in Spanish)

Banco de Reservas de la República Dominicana - Banco Múltiple, S.A., trading as Banreservas, is a state-owned bank in the Dominican Republic. It was founded in 1941, during the government of Rafael Trujillo. The Dominican government is its sole shareholder. It is the country's largest bank by total assets.

== History ==
=== Establishment ===
Until 1941, commercial banking in the Dominican Republic was conducted by three foreign banks with twelve offices in total: the National City Bank of New York, with six; the Royal Bank of Canada, with five; and the Bank of Nova Scotia, with one. The new state bank took over the local operations of the National City Bank of New York.

The bank was founded on 24 October 1941 under Law No. 586. The government provided all of its initial capital of one million pesos.

The first board of directors was chaired by Virgilio Álvarez Pina, then Secretary of the Treasury and Commerce. Pedro R. Espaillat was vice president. The other members included Anselmo Copello, José Antonio Jiménez Álvarez and three directors from the United States. On 25 October 1941, the board approved the bank's bylaws, issued by Decree No. 1290. The bylaws created four departments: agriculture, mining, industry and commerce.

The bank's first offices were in Santo Domingo, Santiago de los Caballeros, San Francisco de Macorís, La Vega, Puerto Plata, Barahona and San Pedro de Macorís.

=== Autonomy and expansion ===
In December 1962, after the end of the Trujillo regime, Law No. 6163 amended the bank's organic law. The new framework made the bank autonomous and its board of directors independent.

In 1997, the bank automated the government payroll and installed ATMs at the National Palace and other public institutions. Later that year, it applied for a licence to operate as a multiple-service bank. The Monetary Board approved the application on 5 March 1998.

In 2024, Law No. 13-24 updated the bank's legal framework. It ended the bank's tax exemption and its designation as the state's fiscal agent. It set the bank's share capital at RD$39 billion. Under the law, 40% of the bank's profits go to the state and 60% to its reserves. The law also allowed the bank to open offices abroad. Banreservas has representative offices in Miami, New York City and Madrid.

== Governance ==
Law No. 13-24 also changed the board of directors. Before the law, the board had six full members, six alternates and three ex officio members. It now has twelve full members and no alternates. The minister of finance and the governor of the Central Bank of the Dominican Republic sit on the board ex officio.

== Operations ==
In 2024, Banreservas had 316 service locations in the Dominican Republic. These were 192 branches, 92 personal banking units, 25 banking service points, six currency exchange offices and one cash centre. The bank has a presence in every province.

At the end of 2025, the bank's total assets exceeded RD$1.28 trillion. Its net profit for the year was RD$25.45 billion. Its gross loan portfolio was RD$628.1 billion, and 95% of it was lent to the private sector. According to data from the Superintendency of Banks, in November 2025 Banreservas held about 32.3% of the assets of the country's multiple-service banks.

In 2025, the Superintendency of Banks gave Banreservas gold ratings in the business and personal banking categories of its digitalization ranking. The bank placed second in the user experience category.

In October 2026, executive president Leonardo Aguilera reported that the bank's total assets had reached RD$1.53 trillion at the end of September 2026, an increase of 13.5% over the previous year. Deposits stood at RD$1.3 trillion. Profits for the first nine months of 2026 were RD$21.08 billion.

== Evolution of Banreservas logo ==
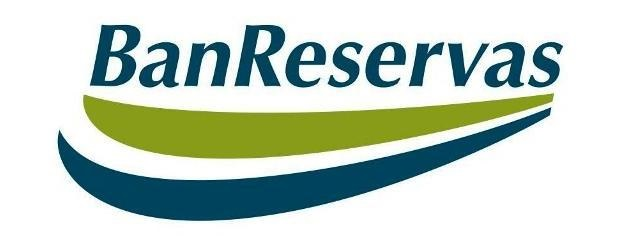
Old logo

Actual logo

== See also ==
- Central Bank of the Dominican Republic
- List of banks in the Dominican Republic
