= Estadio Complejo Deportivo Moca 85 =

Football stadium in Moca, Dominican Republic

- Interactive map of Estadio Complejo Deportivo Moca 85
- Location: Moca, Dominican Republic
- Coordinates: 19.3838222°N 70.5345886°W
- Capacity: 5,000
- Surface: FieldTurf

Construction
- Groundbreaking: 1985
- Opened: 1985
- Renovated: 2016

Tenant
- Moca FC

Estadio Complejo Deportivo Moca 85 is a football stadium in Moca, Dominican Republic. It is currently used for football matches and hosts the home games of Moca FC of the Liga Dominicana de Fútbol. The stadium holds 5,000 spectators.

== History ==
The stadium was built for the 1985 National Games; however, since the Dominican Republic was simultaneously preparing for the 1986 Central American and Caribbean Games, the infrastructure built in Moca was left profoundly lacking, proving to be barely sufficient.

In 2004, the soccer field was damaged during the reconstruction of the athletics track, which caused uneven terrain and left it unusable. The stadium was subsequently remodeled for the VII Espaillat 2016 National School Sports Games by the Ministries of Sports and Education.A perimeter fence was constructed, and the stadium's capacity was expanded to 5,000 spectators with the building of new stands. Following this remodeling, Moca FC moved its home matches for the Liga Dominicana de Fútbol to this venue.

Thanks to the city of Moca's grand soccer tradition, matches for the Central American and Caribbean Games were held at this stadium before completely packed stands.
