= Estadio Olímpico (La Vega) =

Football stadium in the Dominican Republic

Coordinates: 19.228663°N 70.512357°W

- Interactive map of Estadio Olímpico (La Vega)
- Location: Concepción de la Vega, Dominican Republic
- Owner: Concepción de la Vega Government
- Operator: Atlético Vega Real
- Capacity: 7,000
- Surface: Grass

Construction
- Renovated: 2015–2016

Tenant
- Atlético Vega Real

Estadio Olímpico is a multi-use stadium in Concepción de la Vega, Dominican Republic. It is currently used mostly for football matches and hosts the home games of Jarabacoa of the Liga Dominicana de Fútbol. The stadium holds 7,000 spectators.

== Renovations ==
The terrains was renovated after the 2015 Liga Dominicana de Fútbol, and now is up to the requirements of the CONCACAF.
