= Estadio Cibao FC =

Football statdium in the Dominican Republic

- Interactive map of Estadio Cibao FC
- Address: Pontificia Universidad Católica Madre y Maestra
- Location: Santiago de los Caballeros
- Coordinates: 19°26′43.81″N 70°40′46.79″W
- Owner: Cibao FC
- Capacity: 5,000
- Surface: FieldTurf

Construction
- Groundbreaking: November 2014
- Opened: March 8, 2015 (stadium)

Tenants
- Cibao FC (2015–present); Dominican Republic men's national football team (selected matches)

Cibao FC Stadium is a football stadium in Santiago de los Caballeros, Dominican Republic. It is currently used for football matches and hosts the home games of Cibao FC of the Liga Dominicana de Fútbol. The stadium holds 5,000 spectators.

The stadium opened on March 8, 2015, hosting the sold-out inaugural match of the Liga Dominicana de Fútbol between Cibao and Atlético Vega Real. Later that month, the Dominican Republic national football team hosted a friendly against Cuba at the stadium and lost 3–0. The stadium would also host Haitian team Violette AC against Major League Soccer (MLS) club Austin FC and Liga MX club León in the 2023 CONCACAF Champions League due to the instability in Haiti.

== International matches ==
Date	Home	Result	Away	Tournament	Ref
March 25, 2015	Dominican Republic	0–3	Cuba	International friendly	
October 12, 2018	Dominican Republic	3–0	Cayman Islands	Gold Cup Qualification 2019	
March 24, 2019	Dominican Republic	1–3	Bermuda	Gold Cup Qualification 2019	
September 10, 2019	Dominican Republic	1–0	El Salvador	CONCACAF Nations League	
March 7, 2023	(Haiti) Violette AC	3–0	(United States) Austin FC	CONCACAF Champions League	
April 11, 2023	(Haiti) Violette AC	2–1	(Mexico) León	CONCACAF Champions League	
February 22, 2024	(Dominican Republic) Moca FC	0–3	(United States) Nashville SC	2024 CONCACAF Champions Cup	
