= Dominican Football Federation =

Governing body of football in the Dominican Republic

CONCACAF
- Founded: 1953
- Headquarters: Santo Domingo
- FIFA affiliation: 1958
- CONCACAF affiliation: 1964
- President: José Francisco Deschamps Cabral
- Website: fedofutbol.do (in Spanish)

The Dominican Football Federation (Spanish: Federación Dominicana de Fútbol; FDF), also known as Fedofútbol, is the governing body for association football in the Dominican Republic. Based in Santo Domingo, it oversees the country's national teams. The federation launched the Liga Dominicana de Fútbol, which began play in 2015.

== History and affiliations ==
The Dominican Football Federation was founded in 1953, following the spread of football in the country during the first half of the twentieth century, partly through Spanish immigrants. The federation affiliated with FIFA in 1958 and CONCACAF in 1964. It joined the Caribbean Football Union in 1978.

On November 12, 2018, FIFA appointed a normalisation committee to administer the federation after its Ethics Committee imposed a ten-year ban from football-related activities on Osiris Guzmán, who had been president since 1998. Chaired by Manuel José Luna Sued, the committee was tasked with managing the federation's daily affairs, reviewing its statutes and those of its members, and organising elections for member organisations and a new executive committee.

José Francisco Deschamps Cabral was elected president at the federation's General Assembly on April 7, 2024, for the 2024–2028 term. The electoral assembly included voting representatives from provincial football associations, clubs in the Liga Dominicana de Fútbol and LDF Expansión, and the Dominican union of professional footballers.

== Liga Dominicana de Fútbol ==
In September 2014, the federation announced the creation of the Liga Dominicana de Fútbol (LDF), a professional national football league. The first season began on March 8, 2015, with ten clubs in the country's first division.

The league expanded from ten clubs to twelve in 2018, before contracting to eight for the 2022 season. For the 2026–27 season, the eight participating clubs were Cibao FC, Salcedo FC, Delfines del Este FC, Moca FC, Universidad O&M FC, Atlántico FC, Atlético Vega Real and Jarabacoa FC. Salcedo entered the season as defending champion after winning the 2025–26 title.

== Football in the Dominican Republic ==
Football spread in the Dominican Republic partly through Spanish immigrants during the first half of the twentieth century. The Dominican Football Federation was founded in 1953 as the sport became more established in the country.

The creation of the Liga Dominicana de Fútbol introduced a professional national league in 2015. FIFA supported its establishment through training and technical advice.

In 2022, the men's under-20 national team reached the final of the CONCACAF U-20 Championship. Its quarter-final victory over Jamaica secured the country's first qualification for a FIFA World Cup at any age level. By advancing to the final, the team also qualified the Dominican Republic for its first Olympic football tournament. The country subsequently made its debut at the 2023 FIFA U-20 World Cup in Argentina and the men's football tournament at the 2024 Summer Olympics in Paris.

The Dominican Republic hosted the 2024 FIFA U-17 Women's World Cup in Santo Domingo and Santiago de los Caballeros. As hosts, the women's under-17 team entered the competition for the first time.

In 2025, the senior men's national team made its first appearance at the CONCACAF Gold Cup. It finished the group stage with one point after drawing 0–0 with Suriname.

=== Logos ===
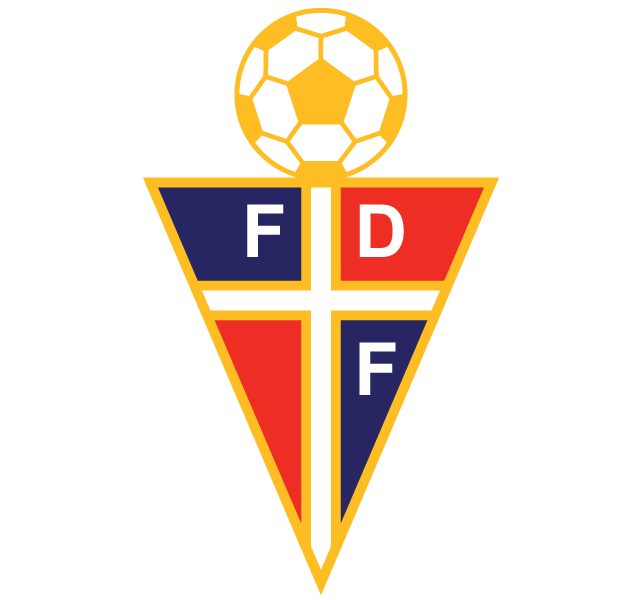
1958–2005

2005–2014

2005–2014 (variant)

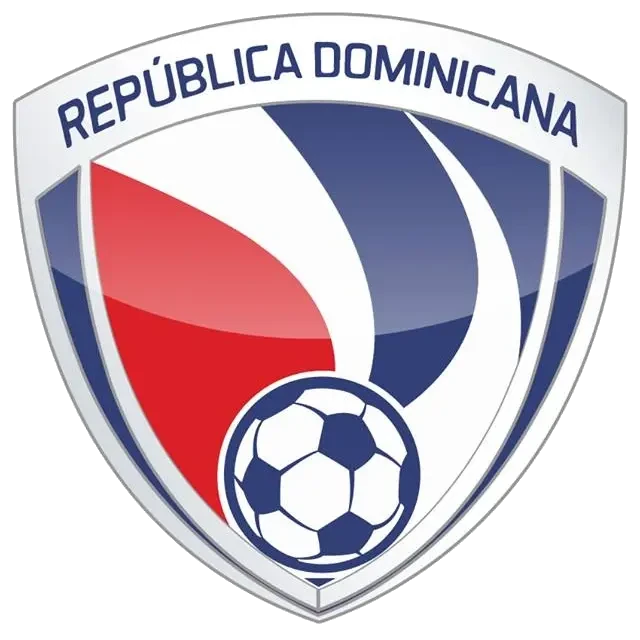
2014–2019

2019–2025

== Training centre ==
The federation's Centro de Alto Rendimiento (CAR), or high-performance centre, is located in San Cristóbal. It provides facilities for national-team training camps and the preparation of coaches and referees. A redevelopment programme supported by FIFA Forward began in March 2023 with a tender for the centre's design and technical studies. Earthworks followed in December that year.

The first stages of the redevelopment were inaugurated on February 12, 2026, with a reported investment of US$4.82 million. The completed works included two regulation-size natural-grass pitches and a two-storey main building with accommodation for two national-team delegations. The building also contains administrative offices, meeting and training rooms, a kitchen, dining facilities and a laundry. A maintenance building and perimeter fencing were completed as part of the same programme.

The redevelopment was planned in stages. Proposals announced in January 2025 included additional football pitches, accommodation for senior national teams, a gymnasium, and facilities for futsal and beach soccer. In July 2026, the centre hosted training camps for the men's and women's teams preparing for the 2026 Central American and Caribbean Games.

== Governance and administration ==
The federation's General Assembly includes voting delegates from provincial football associations and clubs belonging to the Liga Dominicana de Fútbol. At its meeting on April 25, 2026, the assembly approved the federation's annual accounts, the 2026 budget and amendments to its statutes.

=== Leadership ===
The following officials were identified in the federation's report on its April 2026 General Assembly.

Executive committee, 2024–2028
Position	Name	Nationality
President	José Francisco Deschamps Cabral	Dominican Republic
Vice-president	Dinardo Rodríguez Bueno	Dominican Republic
Treasurer	Ángel Baliño González	Dominican Republic
First executive committee member	Miguel Medina Herasme	Dominican Republic
Second executive committee member	Danilo Angiolino Abreu	Dominican Republic
Third executive committee member	Genald Senior Brown	Dominican Republic
Representative of provincial associations	Ángela Bocio	Dominican Republic
Representative of provincial associations	Rubén Muñoz	Dominican Republic
President of the Liga Dominicana de Fútbol	Milton Ray Guevara	Dominican Republic

=== Technical administration ===
FIFA's member association directory lists the following technical officials.

Position	Name	
Technical director	Carlos Ramírez	Dominican Republic
Men's national team coach	Marcelo Neveleff	Argentina
Women's national team coach	Betzaida Ubri	Dominican Republic
Chair of the referees committee	Jorge Mendoza	Dominican Republic
Head of the referees department	Juan Carlos Hidalgo	Dominican Republic
Referee coordinator	Manuel Antonio Cuesta Díaz	Dominican Republic

In August 2026, the federation appointed Anyela Feliz to lead its new women's football department, Alicia Espinal as director of infrastructure and Mauro Aude as operations manager of the training centre.

== Kit supplier ==
On September 24, 2026, the federation announced Reebok as the official kit supplier for its national teams. The agreement covers all age categories, men's and women's teams, and football, futsal and beach soccer, and runs until December 31, 2030.
