= Estadio Leonel Plácido =

Estadio Leonel Placido
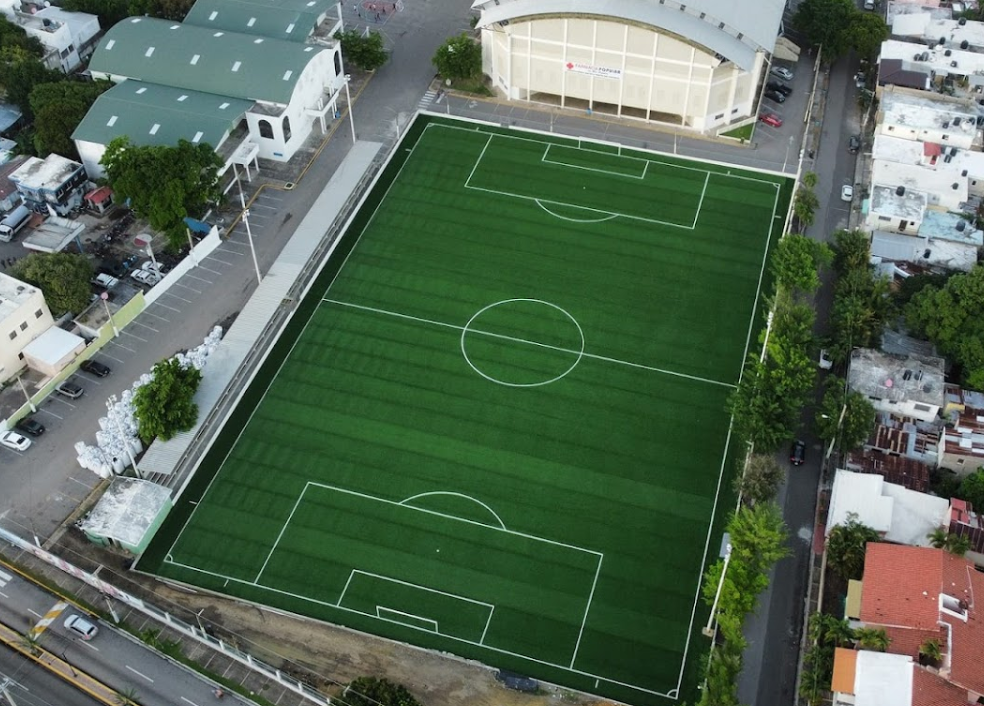
- Interactive map of Estadio Leonel Placido
- Location: Puerto Plata, Dominican Republic
- Coordinates: 19.792°N 70.681°W
- Owner: Puerto Plata government
- Surface: FieldTurf

Tenant
- Atlantico FC

Estadio Leonel Placido is a soccer stadium in Puerto Plata, Dominican Republic. It is currently used for football matches and hosts the home games of Atlantico FC of the Liga Dominicana de Fútbol. The stadium holds 2,000 spectators.
