= Delfines del Este FC =

Dominican professional football club

- Full name: Delfines del Este Fútbol Club
- Nickname: Los Delfines (The Dolphins)
- Founded: November 2014; 11 years ago
- Ground: Estadio Parque del Este
- Capacity: 1,000
- Chairman: Hugo Catrain
- Manager: Garrison Nee Man
- League: Liga Dominicana de Fútbol
- 2025: 437th
Home colours

Delfines del Este Fútbol Club are a Dominican Republic professional football club which competes in the Liga Dominicana de Fútbol. The club is based in La Romana. The club was established in 2014 after the Dominican Football Federation announced the creation of a professional league, the Liga Dominicana de Fútbol.

== Current roster ==
Note: Flags indicate national team as defined under FIFA eligibility rules; some limited exceptions apply. Players may hold more than one non-FIFA nationality.

| No. | Pos. | Nation | Player |
|---|---|---|---|
| 2 | DF | COL | Arles Balanta |
| 3 | DF | COL | Jhon Vergara |
| 4 | DF | DOM | Renzo Sala |
| 6 | MF | COL | Jhon Ramos |
| 7 | MF | DOM | Esmailin Segura |
| 8 | MF | DOM | Carlos Liriano |
| 9 | FW | COL | Cristian Mena |
| 10 | FW | COL | Sebastián Ramos |
| 11 | MF | COL | Yonier Hurtado |
| 13 | FW | DOM | Ronal Suárez |
| 14 | DF | DOM | Joselvis Martínez |

| No. | Pos. | Nation | Player |
|---|---|---|---|
| 15 | DF | DOM | Richard de la Cruz |
| 16 | MF | DOM | Christopher Almonte |
| 20 | DF | DOM | Josias Sánchez |
| 21 | FW | DOM | Richerly de los Santos |
| 22 | MF | DOM | Ysaac Corcino |
| 24 | MF | DOM | Diego Losada |
| 25 | GK | DOM | Pedro Espinal |
| 30 | DF | COL | Octavio Zapata |
| 33 | GK | DOM | Danilo Campana |
| 80 | MF | HAI | Eliader Dorlus |
