= Don Bosco Jarabacoa FC =

Jarabacoa FC
- Full name: Jarabacoa Fútbol Club
- Nickname: La Furia
- Ground: Estadio Junior Mejia, La Vega
- Capacity: 2,000
- Manager: Pedro Estévez
- League: LDF
- 2025: 11th
Home colours	Away colours	Third colours

Jarabacoa F.C. is a football team based in Jarabacoa, Dominican Republic, currently playing in the Primera División de Republica Dominicana.

== Stadium ==
The team plays at the 10,000 capacity Estadio Olímpico (La Vega).
