= Moca FC =

Association football club in Dominican Republic

- Full name: Moca Fútbol Club
- Nickname: The Cradle of Dominican Football
- Founded: 1971; 55 years ago
- Ground: Estadio Complejo Deportivo Moca 85, Moca, Dominican Republic
- Capacity: 4,000
- Manager: Maximiliano Viera
- League: Liga Dominicana de Fútbol
- 2025: 4th, semi-final
- Website: mocafc.com.do
Home colours	Away colours

Moca Fútbol Club is a Dominican professional football team based in Moca, Dominican Republic, founded in 1971. Their home stadium is Estadio Complejo Deportivo Moca 85, and the team plays in the Liga Dominicana de Fútbol (LDF).

== History ==
From 1971 until 2015, Moca FC was the team with the most championships in the now defunct semi-professional football league, Primera División de Republica Dominicana. With 13 titles, Moca was the most popular club in that league. Its province is the "House of the Dominican Football".

In 2015, after the LDF folded, Moca joined the new professional Dominican football league in the first division, Liga Dominicana de Fútbol.

Their classic rivals are Atlético San Cristóbal and Cibao FC.

=== 2023 CONCACAF Caribbean Cup ===
Moca FC advanced to the Semi-Finals where they defeated S.V. Robinhood in leg 1 but lost in leg 2 in penalties. This resulted in Moca FC having to fend for title of 3rd place, which would still qualify them for the CONCACAF Champions Cup. On December 5, 2023, Moca FC won on aggregate 3–2 against Harbour View FC, clinching 3rd place in the 2023 CONCACAF Caribbean Cup. This is the first time Moca FC has ever advanced to the CONCACAF Champions Cup.

== Stadiums ==
- Estadio Don Bosco Moca (1971–14)
- Estadio Bragaña García (2015)
- Estadio Complejo Deportivo Moca 85 (2016–)

== Roster ==
=== Senior Roster ===
As of 24 September, 2026

No.	Pos.	Nation	Player
1	GK	DOM	Alessandro Baroni
2	DF	DOM	Kelvin Duran
4	DF	DOM	Brian López
5	MF	DOM	Keudy Jiménez
6	MF	DOM	José Alcene
7	MF	ARG	Gastón Comas
8	MF	DOM	Gerard Lavergne
9	FW	DOM	José Jáquez
10	FW	COL	Jhoaho Hinestroza
11	FW	VEN	Alexander Oliveros
14	FW	DOM	Enrique De Jesus
17	FW	DOM	Tairon Rodríguez
19	FW	DOM	Sergio Ventura
20	DF	DOM	Guillermo de Peña
21	MF	DOM	Oliver Durán
22	GK	DOM	Robinson Robert
23	DF	COL	Kevin Saucedo
24	FW	COL	Cristian Cangá
25	GK	DOM	Pascual Ramírez
26	MF	DOM	Alex Rodriguez Rosario
29	DF	COL	Eder Arévalo
44	DF	DOM	Lean Torres
49	MF	DOM	Wilsander Pérez
71	MF	DOM	Jason Yambatis Joseph

== Youth academy ==
Moca has historically been a hotspot for many outstanding and developing soccer players for the Dominican Republic national football team. Among these are: Jonathan Faña, Richard Dabas, Jean Carlos López, Ernesto Trinidad. As of the 2023 season, Moca FC has several young players already established in its senior team such as Enrique de Jesus, Alfredo Cortorreal, and Ronaldo Peña.

Moca FC currently has an affiliated/reserve U-23 team in "LDF Expansion", a semi-professional development league that is unofficially considered as the second division of the Dominican Republic. Participation in the academy is free for all players and participants are eligible to be signed to the Moca FC senior team as a homegrown player.

The Youth Academy operates a soccer development program for scouting and identifying players within local clubs throughout Moca. The club also operates the Escuela Jonathan Faña, a pre-academy feeder program for players aged 8–14 which aims to provide training and development for advanced local players and identify potential academy players. Along with the aforementioned football academy exists The Moca Juniors Program, a program designed to provide supplemental development for U-12 players & other Moca-area youth clubs.

== Current first team staff ==
- Head Coach: (Colombia) Sergio Guzman
- Assistant Coach: (Dominican Republic) Jonathan Urena
- Physical trainer: (Colombia) Jair Alzate

== Championships ==
- Primera Dvision (8): 1976, 1978, 1979, 1985, 1986, 1987, 1995, 1999
- Liga Mayor (2): 2010, 2014
- CFU Club Shield (1): 2025
