= Cibao FC =

Association football club in Dominican Republic

- Full name: Cibao Fútbol Club
- Nickname: La Bestia Naranja (The Orange Beast)
- Short name: Cibao FC
- Founded: 2015; 11 years ago
- Stadium: Estadio Cibao FC; Santiago de los Caballeros, Dominican Republic
- Chairman: Manuel Estrella
- Manager: Scheldeur Sainvilus
- League: Liga Dominicana de Fútbol
- 2025: 1st, Liguilla
- Website: www.cibaofc.com
| Home colours | Away colours |

Cibao Fútbol Club is a Dominican professional football team based in Santiago de los Caballeros. Founded in 2015, the team competes in the Liga Dominicana de Fútbol.

== History ==
Cibao Futbol Club was founded on 1 January 2015, ahead of the inaugural season of the Liga Dominicana de Fútbol. The club built a new stadium, Estadio Cibao FC, that opened on 8 March 2015.

Cibao FC partnered with the Pontificia Universidad Católica Madre y Maestra and the ARMID Foundation to build the stadium and form a development academy. The Pontificia Universidad Católica Madre y Maestra contributed 26,187 square meters of land for the construction of the stadium. The ARMID-Foundation Real Madrid Foundation used these facilities to establish the first Real Madrid Foundation's Tecnification School in Latin America, which will be responsible for giving sports and academic training to children and adolescents.

On 21 May 2017, the team won the 2017 Caribbean Club Championship by defeating San Juan Jabloteh in the final, becoming the first team from the Dominican Republic to be crowned Caribbean club champions and the first to qualify for the CONCACAF Champions League, the team played against Guadalajara in the 2018 CONCACAF Champions League.

From 2018 to 2024, Cibao FC achieved success in the Liga Dominicana de Fútbol (LDF). The club began this period by defending its title successfully, clinching the 2018 LDF Championship.

In 2019, Cibao FC reached the playoffs again but fell short of capturing the title.

The breakthrough year came in 2021, when Cibao FC captured its second league title, the 2021 Liga Dominicana de Fútbol.

In 2021, the team faced challenges due to the impact of the COVID-19 pandemic, but they adapted by focusing on player fitness and mental resilience. This determination paid off in 2022, when Cibao FC claimed yet another title, the 2022 LDF Championship, further cementing their place in Dominican football history. Their success was marked by a solid defense and an attacking strategy that kept opponents on their toes. They were runners up in 2022 Caribbean Club Championship.

Continuing this trajectory, Cibao FC reached another milestone in 2023 by winning the 2023 LDF Championship, making it their fourth league title in just a few years. They were runners up 2024 CONCACAF Caribbean Cup.

== Stadium ==
The Estadio Cibao FC is a football stadium located in Pontificia Universidad Católica Madre y Maestra campus, Santiago de los Caballeros, Dominican Republic. It is currently used for football matches and hosts the home games of Cibao FC of the Liga Dominicana de Fútbol. The stadium holds 8,000 spectators. On 29 July 2023, the venue hosted a Liga Dominicana de Fútbol game between Cibao FC and Atlético Vega Real. 2,800 people attended the game. It was the best-attended Liga Dominicana de Fútbol match in 2023.

== Players ==
Note: Flags indicate national team as defined under FIFA eligibility rules; some limited exceptions apply. Players may hold more than one non-FIFA nationality.

| No. | Pos. | Nation | Player |
|---|---|---|---|
| 1 | GK | DOM | Miguel Lloyd |
| 2 | DF | COL | Darwin Palomeque |
| 3 | DF | COL | Julio Murillo |
| 4 | DF | DOM | Óscar Florencio |
| 5 | DF | DOM | Ismael Díaz |
| 6 | DF | DOM | Darlin Ozuna |
| 7 | FW | DOM | Yunior Peralta |
| 8 | MF | DOM | Wilman Modesta |
| 9 | FW | ARG | Diego Ledesma |
| 10 | MF | DOM | Miguel Muñoz |
| 11 | FW | URU | Mariano Nichele |
| 12 | GK | DOM | Edwin Frías |

| No. | Pos. | Nation | Player |
|---|---|---|---|
| 13 | MF | DOM | Javier Roces |
| 14 | MF | DOM | Jean Carlos López |
| 15 | MF | DOM | Nico Cruz |
| 17 | DF | DOM | Edwarlyn Reyes |
| 19 | FW | DOM | Cesarin Ortiz |
| 20 | MF | DOM | Omar de la Cruz |
| 22 | DF | DOM | Ernesto Trinidad |
| 23 | FW | COL | Víctor Minotta |
| 24 | DF | DOM | Joao Urbáez |
| 27 | MF | URU | Anthony Sosa |
| 30 | FW | DOM | Juan Ángeles |

=== Technical staff ===
| Role | Name | Nationality |
|---|---|---|
| Head coach | Gabriel Martínez Poch | Argentina |
| Assistant coach | Scheldeur Jr Sainvilus | Haiti |
| Goalkeeper trainer | Yova Velazquez | Venezuela |
| Athletic trainer | Maximiliano Alonso | Argentina |

== Honours ==
=== Championships ===
- 2018 Liga Dominicana de Fútbol
- 2021 Liga Dominicana de Fútbol
- 2022 Liga Dominicana de Fútbol
- 2023 Liga Dominicana de Fútbol
- 2024 Liga Dominicana de Fútbol
- Copa LDF(Transitional tournament)

=== Runner-up ===
- 2016 Liga Dominicana de Fútbol Season
- 2019 Liga Dominicana de Fútbol
- 2025-26 Liga Dominicana de Fútbol

=== National Cup ===
- Copa Dominicana de Futbol 2015 Winner
- Copa Dominicana de Futbol 2016 Winner
- Copa Dominicana de Futbol 2025 Winner

=== International achievements ===
- Copa Dominico-Haitiana Champions 2016
- 2017 CFU Club Championship Winners
- 2022 Caribbean Club Championship Runner-up
- 2024 CONCACAF Caribbean Cup Runners-up
