= Liga Dominicana de Fútbol =

Dominican association football league

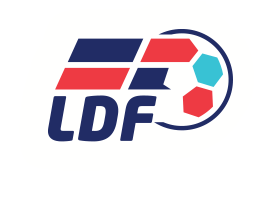
- Organising body: Dominican Football Federation
- Founded: 2014; 12 years ago
- Country: Dominican Republic
- Confederation: CONCACAF
- Number of clubs: 10(9)
- Level on pyramid: 1
- Relegation to: None
- Domestic cup: Copa Dominicana de Fútbol
- International cup(s): Regional; CFU Club Shield; CONCACAF Caribbean Cup; Continental; CONCACAF Champions Cup
- Current champions: Salcedo FC (2025-26) (first title)
- Most championships: Cibao F.C. (6 titles)
- Broadcaster(s): Domestic; CDN Deportes Live Streaming; YouTube: Canal official de Liga Dominicana de Fútbol
- Website: ligadominicanadefutbol.com
- Current: 2026–27 Liga Dominicana de Fútbol

The Liga Dominicana de Fútbol is the first professional football league in the Dominican Republic, it was launched in March 2015. For sponsorship reasons it is known as LDF Banco Popular.

== History ==
Prior to the league's establishment, football in the Dominican Republic was only played in a semi-pro level.

To address the issue and to raise the status of football in the country, the Dominican Football Federation has decided to implement the idea of a new professional league in the country, to attract more people into the sport. Thus, the Liga Dominicana de Fútbol was approved, as an attempt to raise the country's football profile. The first season began in 2014.

=== Jarabacoa FC gets Relegated for the 2024 Season ===
On 2 February 2024, the Official Jarabacoa FC account on X announced they will not participate in the 2024 season in desire to maintain and improve their turf along with general improvements to their Stadium. The 2024 season will feature the previous 8 teams from the 2023 season.

== Competition format ==
In the first three installments, each team played 18 matches in the regular season with the 4 teams with most points qualifying for the playoffs. The champion was decided in a single-legged final.

The 2018 season grew from 10 to 12 teams with the arrival of San Francisco de Macoris (Atlético) and Bayaguana (Inter). Since Delfines from the Eastern part of the country joined, the LDF now had a team in each of the seven provinces and the National District, and the only professional league with a team in the South region San Cristóbal.

The tournament featured 132 regular series matches. Each team played 22 games in the regular phase (instead of the 18 of the first three editions), and the six highest scoring advanced to the second phase, where they played one against all in a round. The best four then advanced to a semi-final with round-trip matches. The winners had a championship in a single match, which extends the league calendar to 152 matches from 95 in 2017.

As a novelty, the LDF 2018 season had a national and international television transmission chain that brought the small screen 60 matches at the local level and a number of meetings to be defined that will be taken to at least five nations of the region, including the United States and Mexico.

The 2019 tournament of the Liga Dominicana de Futbol started with 12 teams. The event brought up a new format in which each of the twelve clubs can have up to 6 foreign players on their payroll.

The new format includes an "Apertura" and a "Clausura" tournament, both will be played one round and have been agreed with the twelve clubs and also with CONCACAF. The "Apertura" will have a semifinal with the four best teams and then a final, as well as the "Clausura".

The champion of each tournament will then compete to win the qualification to the CONCACAF championship tournament. Another club will qualify for the CONCACAF tournament, accumulating the most points in both tournaments.

== Teams ==
Team	City	Stadium (capacity)	Image	Founded	First season	Head coach
LDF
Cibao F.C.	Santiago	Estadio Cibao FC (10,000)		2014	2015	(Argentina) Jorge Alfonso
Atlético Vega Real	La Vega	Estadio Olímpico (La Vega) (7,000)		2014	2015	(Dominican Republic) Jose Rodriguez
Moca F.C.	Moca	Estadio Complejo Deportivo Moca 86 (2,000)		1971	2015	(Dominican Republic) Ronald Batista
Atlántico F.C.	Puerto Plata	Estadio Leonel Plácido (2,000)		2014	2015	(Dominican Republic) Lenín José Bastidas Bello
C.A. San Cristóbal	San Cristóbal	Estadio Panamericano (3,000)		2014	2015	(Dominican Republic) Froilán Hidalgo
Delfines Del Este F.C.	Santo Domingo	Estadio Parque del Este (2,300)		2014	2015	(Peru) Juan Carlos Gastón
Universidad O&M F.C.	Santo Domingo	Estadio Olímpico Félix Sánchez (27,000)		2010	2015	(Uruguay) Martín Arriola
C.A. Pantoja	Santo Domingo	Estadio Olímpico Félix Sánchez (27,000)		1999	2015	(Uruguay) Orlando Capellino
Jarabacoa FC	Jarabacoa	Estadio de Fútbol Junior Mejía (1,800)		2018	2023	Ramón Calderon
Salcedo FC	Salcedo	Estadio Domingo Polonia (2,000)		1992	2025	

== Former Teams ==
Team	City	Stadium (capacity)	First season	Last season	Head coach	Record W/T/L
Club Barcelona Atlético	Santo Domingo	Estadio Parque del Este (3,500)	2015	2019		25/28/40
Bauger F.C.	Santo Domingo	Estadio Olímpico Félix Sánchez (27,000)	2015	2017	Jorge Rolando Baguer	24/06/24
Inter de Bayaguana	Bayaguana	Estadio Bayaguana (1,000)	2018	2019		2/4/16
Atlético San Francisco	San Francisco de Macorís	Complejo Deportivo Juan Pablo Duarte (2,500)	2017	2022	Daniel Álvarez	26/15/28

== Champions ==
Results by year
Year	Play-off Champions (Champions)	Regular Season (Regular Season)	Runner-up	Top Scorer(s)	Top Scorer's Club	Goals
2015	Pantoja	Bauger	Atlántico FC	Jonathan Faña	Bauger	17
2016	Barcelona Atlético	Barcelona Atlético	Cibao	Anderson Arias	Club Barcelona Atlético	11
2017	Atlántico FC	Cibao FC	Atlético Pantoja	Armando Maita, Mauro Gomez, Woodensky Cherenfant	Club Atlético Pantoja, Atlántico FC, Cibao FC	10
2018	Cibao FC	Atlético de San Francisco	Atlético de San Francisco	Fredys Arrieta	Atlético de San Francisco	18
2019	Pantoja	Cibao FC	Cibao FC	Pablo Marisi	Club Atlético Pantoja	13
2020	O&M FC	Cibao FC, O&M FC	Delfines del Este FC	Daniel Jamesley	O&M FC	7
2021	Cibao FC	Cibao FC	Atlético Vega Real	Juan David Díaz Sánchez	Atlético Pantoja	18
2022	Cibao FC	Cibao FC	Atlético Pantoja	Gustavo Azcona	Moca FC	14
2023	Cibao FC	Cibao FC	Moca FC	Oscar Leonardo Becerra Gamboa	Atlantico FC	18
2024	Cibao FC	Cibao FC	O&M FC	Rivaldo Correa and Luis Espinal	Cibao FC	21
Transition Tournament 2025 – Copa LDF	Cibao FC	Cibao FC	Delfines del Este FC	Rivaldo Correa	Cibao FC	9
2025–26	Salcedo FC	Cibao FC	Cibao FC	Daniel Jamesley	Salcedo FC	20

== Most goals ==
Place	Player	Country	Team (s)	Goals
1	Anderson Arias	Venezuela	Atlántico FC (2015); Club Barcelona Atlético (2016); O&M FC (2017) (2018); Atletico San Francisco	47
2	Pablo Marsini	Argentina	Atlantico FC (2017); Cibao FC (2018); Club Atlético Pantoja (2019)	38
3	Domingo Peralta	Dominican Republic	Cibao FC (2015–2017) (2018); Moca FC (2019); Atletico Vega Real (2020–); O&M FC	37
4	Daniel Jamesley	Haiti	Jarabacoa FC (2018) (2019–); O&M FC	37
5	Charles Herold Jr.	Haiti	Cibao FC (2015–)	36
6	Luis Espinal	Dominican Republic	Club Atlético Pantoja (2015–2019); Cibao FC (2021–); Moca FC	33
7	Jonathan Faña	Dominican Republic	Bauger FC (2015); Cibao FC (2016); Moca FC (2017); Club Atlético Pantoja (2018)	30
8	Sam Colson	Haiti	Cibao FC (2015–2017); Atletico San Cristobal (2018); Atletico Vega Real (2018)	30
9	Berthame Dine	Haiti	Atlántico FC (2015); Atlético Vega Real (2016–)	25
10	Bony Pierre	Haiti	Bauger FC (2015–2016); Club Barcelona Atlético (2017–)	21

== Stadiums and locations ==
Locations of teams as of 2025

=== Current LDF stadiums ===
Atlántico FC Estadio Leonel Plácido Capacity: 2,000	Atlético San Cristóbal Estadio Panamericano Capacity: 2,000
Club Atlético Pantoja | Universidad O&M FC Estadio Felix Sanchez Capacity: 27,000	Delfines Del Este Estadio Parque del Este Capacity: 1,000
Estadio Moca FC Estadio Complejo Deportivo Moca 86 Capacity: 4,000	Delfines Del Este Estadio Parque del Este Capacity: 1,000
Cibao FC Estadio Cibao FC Capacity: 4,000	Jarabacoa FC Estadio Junior Mejia Capacity: 2,000
Cibao FC Estadio Cibao FC Capacity: 4,000	Atlético Vega Real Estadio Olímpico (La Vega) Capacity: 2,000
Salcedo FC Estadio Domingo Polonia Capacity: 2,000	Atlético Vega Real Estadio Olímpico (La Vega) Capacity: 2,000
