= Atlético Pantoja =

Association football club in Dominican Republic

- Full name: Club Atlético Pantoja
- Nickname: Los Guerreros (The Warriors)
- Founded: 1 February 1999; 27 years ago
- Ground: Estadio Olímpico Félix Sánchez
- Capacity: 27,000
- Manager: Jesús Quintero
- League: Liga Dominicana de Fútbol
- 2025: 3rd
- Website: www.ligadominicanadefutbol.com/team/Pantoja/
| Home colours | Away colours |

Club Atlético Pantoja is one of two professional football teams based in Santo Domingo, Dominican Republic. Founded in 1999, the team is currently playing in the Liga Dominicana de Fútbol, the top division of Dominican football. Their crosstown counterparts and co-tenants at Estadio Olímpico Félix Sánchez are O&M FC.

== History ==
Club Atlético Pantoja was born from a group composed mostly of Argentinian immigrants, led by Eduardo Macchiavello. The club began playing amateur matches in 1999 at the ROWE Laboratory, located in the popular neighborhood of Pantoja in the city of Santo Domingo.

In time, the group became larger by catering to local Dominicans and other nationalities. In 2001 they were invited to participate in a veteran tournament organized by the Dominican Football Federation, ultimately becoming the champions. The club went on to participate in the Third Dominican Division.

Months later, the club became champion in its first participation in an official competition. This championship allowed them to ascend to the Second Division, which involved a greater challenge.

The newly promoted Club Atlético Pantoja again became champion of the Second Division league, a team made up mostly of veterans. This team had achieved the feat of "champion" three consecutive times, allowing them promotion to the maximum category of soccer in the Dominican Republic, Primera División de Republica Dominicana. This group would propose to reach another milestone, the title of First Division. From then a technical body was hired, in addition to adding young players as reinforcements. The fusion of youth and experience led the Club to reach the maximum laureate in Dominican football: the Primera División championship.

The club in a short time positioned itself as one of the winningest clubs from the Dominican Republic. The club has taken place in the CONCACAF Champions Cup (Formerly CONCACAF Champions League) a total of two times as of the 2024 season. Atlético Pantoja became the first association football club from the Dominican Republic with 10,000 followers on Facebook, their most popular social media page.

== Stadium ==
- Estadio Olímpico Félix Sánchez: 2014–

== Achievements ==
=== Domestic ===
- Liga Dominicana de Fútbol: 3
  - 2015, Apertura 2019, Gran Final 2019
- Liga Mayor Coca-Cola: 3
  - 2004–05, 2009, 2011–12
- Campeonato Nacional: 2
  - 2000–01, 2002–03

=== Regional ===
- Caribbean Club Championship: 2
  - 2018
  - 2020

== Current squad ==
Note: Flags indicate national team as defined under FIFA eligibility rules; some limited exceptions apply. Players may hold more than one non-FIFA nationality.

| No. | Pos. | Nation | Player |
|---|---|---|---|
| 1 | GK | DOM | Alessandro Baroni |
| 4 | DF | DOM | Óscar Florencio |
| 5 | DF | DOM | Pinta Diaz |
| 6 | MF | HAI | Patrickson Nore |
| 7 | FW | DOM | Luis Espinal |
| 8 | MF | DOM | Gerard Lavergne |
| 9 | FW | DOM | José Jáquez |
| 10 | MF | COL | Fabricio Moreno |
| 11 | FW | VEN | Édison Guerrero |
| 14 | MF | DOM | Yordy Álvarez |
| 15 | MF | VEN | Jordan Montezuma |
| 16 | MF | DOM | Robert Rosado |
| 17 | DF | DOM | Alexánder Vidal |

| No. | Pos. | Nation | Player |
|---|---|---|---|
| 18 | DF | DOM | Jeremy Baez |
| 19 | FW | DOM | Fraimy Lapaix |
| 20 | DF | COL | Jefrey Trujillo |
| 21 | FW | HAI | Bertrand Frantz |
| 22 | FW | VEN | Alejandro Rodríguez |
| 23 | GK | DOM | José Manuel Tejeda |
| 25 | GK | DOM | Eliam Martinez |
| 27 | MF | DOM | Samil de la Rosa |
| 28 | MF | DOM | José Alcene |
| 29 | FW | DOM | José Jáquez |
| 30 | MF | DOM | Carlos Sarante |
| 32 | DF | DOM | Maximiliano Jérez |
