= Atlético Vega Real =

Atletico Vega Real
- Full name: Atletico Vega Real
- Founded: 2014; 11 years ago
- Ground: Estadio Olímpico (La Vega), La Vega, Dominican Republic
- Capacity: 7,000
- Chairman: José Deschamps
- Manager: Nahuel Bernabei
- League: Liga Dominicana de Fútbol
- 2025: 9th

Atletico Vega Real is a Dominican professional football club based in La Vega, Dominican Republic, founded in 2014. It plays in the Liga Dominicana de Fútbol.

== Staff ==
- (Cuba) Raul Gonzalez – Head coach
