= O&M FC =

Association football club in Dominican Republic

O&M
- Full name: O&M Fútbol Club
- Nickname: La Universidad (The University)
- Founded: 1974; 52 years ago
- Ground: Estadio Olímpico Félix Sánchez
- Capacity: 27,000
- Manager: Ronald Batista
- League: Liga Dominicana de Fútbol
- 2025: 5th
Home colours	Away colours

O&M Fútbol Club is a football team based in Santo Domingo, Dominican Republic. The team represents the Universidad Organización y Método and is currently playing in the Liga Dominicana De Futbol.

Currently the team plays at the 27,000 capacity Estadio Olímpico Félix Sánchez.

== History ==
O&M FC is a Professional Football Club of the Dominican Republic based in the city of Santo Domingo and represents the Dominican University O & M. Currently the club participates in the Liga Dominicana de Fútbol. This the first university to penetrate professional Dominican sports.

== Current squad ==
Note: Flags indicate national team as defined under FIFA eligibility rules; some limited exceptions apply. Players may hold more than one non-FIFA nationality.

No.	Pos.	Nation	Player
1	GK	DOM	Omry Bello
2	DF	DOM	Yoan Melo
3	DF	COL	Daniel Montoya
5	MF	DOM	Ángel Montes de Oca
6	MF	DOM	Gabriel Castillo
7	FW	DOM	Josué Báez
8	MF	DOM	Sergio Abreu
9	FW	COL	Sebastián Mosquera
11	FW	COL	Camilo Monroy
14	DF	DOM	Jayson Made
16	DF	DOM	Reyvin de la Rosa

No.	Pos.	Nation	Player
17	DF	DOM	Hansley Martínez
19	MF	DOM	Emmanuel Cuello
21	FW	DOM	Fraimy Lapaix
22	MF	USA	Andrés Jiménez
23	GK	DOM	Gerald Villar
24	DF	DOM	Kleffer Martes
29	MF	DOM	Simón Cuello
31	FW	DOM	William Paulino
33	MF	DOM	Samil De La Rosa

== Achievements ==
- Copa Dominicana de Fútbol runners-up 2015

== Notable players ==
- (Cambodia) Andrés Nieto
