= 2023 CONCACAF Caribbean Cup group stage =

Annual edition of a club football competition

The 2023 CONCACAF Caribbean Cup group stage is being played from 23 August to 5 October 2023. A total of 10 teams compete in the group stage to decide the 4 places in the knockout stage of the 2023 CONCACAF Caribbean Cup.

== Draw ==
The draw for the group stage was held on 8 June 2023 at 17:00 EDT (UTC−4) in Miami, Florida, United States. The 10 involved teams were previously seeded into five pots of two teams each based on their CONCACAF Club Ranking as of 28 May 2023, except for the teams in pot 5, which was reserved for the champions and runners-up of the 2023 CONCACAF Caribbean Shield.

Pot	Team	Rank	Pts
1	(Dominican Republic) Cibao	87	1,056
1	(Trinidad and Tobago) Defence Force	105	1,029
2	(Jamaica) Cavalier	108	1,025
2	(Dominican Republic) Atlético Pantoja	114	1,020
3	(Dominican Republic) Moca	119	1,016
3	(Jamaica) Harbour View	130	1,006
4	(Jamaica) Dunbeholden	131	1,006
4	(Trinidad and Tobago) Port of Spain	159	946
5	(Suriname) Robinhood	—	
5	(Martinique) Golden Lion	—	

Notes

1. ^{CCS} The identity of the champions (Robinhood) and runners-up (Golden Lion) of the 2023 CONCACAF Caribbean Shield was not known at the time the pots were determined.

For the group stage, the 10 teams were drawn into two groups (Groups A and B) of five containing a team from each of the five pots. Teams from pot 1 were drawn first and were placed in the first position of their group, starting with Group A and then Group B. The same procedure was followed for teams from pots 2, 3, 4 and 5, and they were placed in positions 2, 3, 4 and 5, respectively, within the group to which they were drawn. Each group must contain no more than two clubs from the same national association. No restrictions were applied at the time of drawing the groups.

The draw resulted in the following groups:

Group A
Pos	Team
A1	(Trinidad and Tobago) Defence Force
A2	(Jamaica) Cavalier
A3	(Dominican Republic) Moca
A4	(Trinidad and Tobago) Port of Spain
A5	(Martinique) Golden Lion

Group B
Pos	Team
B1	(Dominican Republic) Cibao
B2	(Dominican Republic) Atlético Pantoja
B3	(Jamaica) Harbour View
B4	(Jamaica) Dunbeholden
B5	(Suriname) Robinhood

Notes

1. ^{CCS} The identity of the champions (Robinhood) and runners-up (Golden Lion) of the 2023 CONCACAF Caribbean Shield was not known at the time of the draw.

== Format ==
In the group stage, each group is played on a single home-and-away round-robin basis, with teams playing against each other once, for a total of four matches per team (two home and two away). The teams are ranked according to the following criteria (Regulations Article 12.8.1).:

1. Points (3 points for a win, 1 point for a draw, and 0 points for a loss);
2. Goal difference;
3. Goals scored;
4. If two or more teams are still tied after applying the above criteria, their rankings would be determined as follows:
  1. Points in the matches played among the tied teams;
  2. Goal difference in the matches played among the tied teams (if more than two teams are equal on points);
  3. Goals scored in the matches played among the tied teams (if more than two teams are equal on points);
  4. The lowest number of disciplinary points, based on the following criteria:
    1. Yellow card: plus 1 point;
    2. Second yellow card/indirect red card: plus 3 points;
    3. Direct red card: plus 4 points;;
    4. Yellow card and direct red card: plus 5 points;
5. Drawing of lots by CONCACAF.

The winners and runners-up of each group advanced to the semi-finals of the knockout stage.

== Schedule ==
Matches in the competition are being played on either Tuesday, Wednesday, or Thursday as decided by CONCACAF. The schedule of each week is as follows (Regulations Article 2).

Weeks	Dates	Matches
Week 1	23–24 August 2023	Team 1 vs. Team 2, Team 3 vs. Team 4
Week 2	29–31 August 2023	Team 5 vs. Team 1, Team 2 vs. Team 4
Week 3	19–21 September 2023	Team 4 vs. Team 5, Team 2 vs. Team 3
Week 4	26–28 September 2023	Team 4 vs. Team 1, Team 3 vs. Team 5
Week 5	3–4 October 2023	Team 1 vs. Team 3, Team 5 vs. Team 2

== Groups ==
All match times are in EDT (UTC−4) and local times, if different, are in parentheses as listed by CONCACAF.

=== Group A ===
Pos	Team	Pld	W	D	L	GF	GA	GD	Pts	Qualification	CAV	MOC	DFO	GLI	POS
1	(Jamaica) Cavalier	4	3	1	0	11	4	+7	10	Advance to semi-finals	—	3–0	—	—	2–1
2	(Dominican Republic) Moca	4	3	0	1	6	3	+3	9	Advance to semi-finals	—	—	—	3–0	1–0
3	(Trinidad and Tobago) Defence Force	4	1	2	1	3	4	−1	5		1–1	0–2	—	—	—
4	(Martinique) Golden Lion	4	1	0	3	5	11	−6	3		2–5	—	0–1	—	—
5	(Trinidad and Tobago) Port of Spain	4	0	1	3	4	7	−3	1		—	—	1–1	2–3	—

Source: CONCACAF
24 August 2023
20:00

Defence Force (Trinidad and Tobago)	1–1	(Jamaica) Cavalier
Moore 6'	Report	Thomas 36' (pen.)

Hasely Crawford Stadium, Port of Spain
Referee: Shavin Greene (Guyana)
25 August 2023 (Note: The Moca v Port of Spain match, originally scheduled for 24 August, 18:00 EDT, was re-scheduled to 25 August, 10:00 EDT due to adverse weather conditions.)
10:00

Moca (Dominican Republic)	1–0	(Trinidad and Tobago) Port of Spain
Vidal 55'	Report

Estadio Complejo Deportivo Moca 86, Moca
Referee: Steffon Dewar (Jamaica)

30 August 2023
18:00

Golden Lion (Martinique)	0–1	(Trinidad and Tobago) Defence Force
	Report	Moore 48'

Stade Pierre-Aliker, Fort-de-France
Referee: Norberto Da Silva (Curaçao)
31 August 2023
18:00 (17:00 UTC−5)

Cavalier (Jamaica)	2–1	(Trinidad and Tobago) Port of Spain
Calvin 8'; Ainsworth 60'	Report	Muckette 71'

Independence Park, Kingston
Referee: Yadel Martínez (Cuba)

19 September 2023
20:00 (19:00 UTC−5)

Cavalier (Jamaica)	3–0	(Dominican Republic) Moca
Thomas 23', 58', 77' (pen.)	Report

Independence Park, Kingston
Referee: Reon Radix (Grenada)
20 September 2023
18:00

Port of Spain (Trinidad and Tobago)	2–3	(Martinique) Golden Lion
Abu Bakr 28'; Mondesir 68' (o.g.)	Report	Catherine 2'; Primus 16' (o.g.); Parsemain 83' (pen.)

Hasely Crawford Stadium, Port of Spain
Referee: Adonis Carrasco (Dominican Republic)

26 September 2023
20:00

Moca (Dominican Republic)	3–0	(Martinique) Golden Lion
Ascona 23'; Sánchez 27', 45+1'	Report

Estadio Complejo Deportivo Moca 86, Moca
Referee: Carl-Henry Elie (Haiti)
28 September 2023
18:00

Port of Spain (Trinidad and Tobago)	1–1	(Trinidad and Tobago) Defence Force
Poon-Angeron 77'	Report	Sam 90+3'

Hasely Crawford Stadium, Port of Spain
Referee: Kimbell Ward (Saint Kitts and Nevis)

4 October 2023
20:00

Golden Lion (Martinique)	2–5	(Jamaica) Cavalier
Catherine 51'; Charloton 71'	Report	Bellance 7' (o.g.); Calvin 14'; Thomas 34', 37', 45+2'

Stade Pierre-Aliker, Fort-de-France
Referee: Ken Pennyfeather (Antigua and Barbuda)
4 October 2023
20:00

Defence Force (Trinidad and Tobago)	0–2	(Dominican Republic) Moca
	Report	Ascona 64'; de Peña 90+4'

Hasely Crawford Stadium, Port of Spain
Referee: Shavin Greene (Guyana)

=== Group B ===
Pos	Team	Pld	W	D	L	GF	GA	GD	Pts	Qualification	ROB	HAR	CIB	DUN	APA
1	(Suriname) Robinhood	4	3	0	1	8	4	+4	9	Advance to semi-finals	—	—	1–0	—	3–1
2	(Jamaica) Harbour View	4	2	1	1	6	5	+1	7	Advance to semi-finals	3–2	—	—	1–0	—
3	(Dominican Republic) Cibao	4	1	1	2	4	5	−1	4		—	2–1	—	—	1–1
4	(Jamaica) Dunbeholden	4	1	1	2	3	5	−2	4		0–2	—	2–1	—	—
5	(Dominican Republic) Atlético Pantoja	4	0	3	1	4	6	−2	3		—	1–1	—	1–1	—

Source: CONCACAF
23 August 2023
18:00 (17:00 UTC−5)

Harbour View (Jamaica)	1–0	(Jamaica) Dunbeholden
Burton 71'	Report

Independence Park, Kingston
Referee: Ken Pennyfeather (Antigua and Barbuda)
24 August 2023 (Note: The Cibao v Atlético Pantoja match, originally scheduled for 23 August, 20:00 EDT, was re-scheduled to 24 August, 21:00 EDT due to adverse weather conditions related to the Tropical Storm Franklin.)
21:00

Cibao (Dominican Republic)	1–1	(Dominican Republic) Atlético Pantoja
Ventura 34'	Report	Castaño 89'

Estadio Cibao, Santiago de los Caballeros
Referee: Reon Radix (Grenada)

30 August 2023
20:00

Atlético Pantoja (Dominican Republic)	1–1	(Jamaica) Dunbeholden
Espinal 14'	Report	D-A. Thomas 48'

Félix Sánchez Olympic Stadium, Santo Domingo
Referee: Reginald Gumbs (Saint Kitts and Nevis)
31 August 2023
20:00 (21:00 UTC−3)

Robinhood (Suriname)	1–0	(Dominican Republic) Cibao
Cairo 55'	Report

Dr. Ir. Franklin Essed Stadion, Paramaribo
Referee: Kimbell Ward (Saint Kitts and Nevis)

20 September 2023
20:00

Atlético Pantoja (Dominican Republic)	1–1	(Jamaica) Harbour View
Rosado 59' (pen.)	Report	Thompson 6'

Félix Sánchez Olympic Stadium, Santo Domingo
Referee: Cleon Culley (Guyana)
21 September 2023
20:00 (19:00 UTC−5)

Dunbeholden (Jamaica)	0–2	(Suriname) Robinhood
	Report	Cairo 15', 55'

Independence Park, Kingston
Referee: Moeth Gaymes (Saint Vincent and the Grenadines)

27 September 2023
20:00 (19:00 UTC−5)

Harbour View (Jamaica)	3–2	(Suriname) Robinhood
Thompson 45+5'; Bradford 55', 69'	Report	Cairo 33'; Rigters 50' (pen.)

Independence Park, Kingston
Referee: Kwinsi Williams (Trinidad and Tobago)
28 September 2023
20:00 (19:00 UTC−5)

Dunbeholden (Jamaica)	2–1	(Dominican Republic) Cibao
Powell 45+2'; Brown 63'	Report	Guichón 55'

Independence Park, Kingston
Referee: Reginald Gumbs (Saint Kitts and Nevis)

5 October 2023
20:00 (21:00 UTC−3)

Robinhood (Suriname)	3–1	(Dominican Republic) Atlético Pantoja
Rigters 57'; Adipi 75'; Cairo 82'	Report	Ortega 20' (pen.)

Dr. Ir. Franklin Essed Stadion, Paramaribo
Referee: Ricangel de Leça (Aruba)
5 October 2023
20:00

Cibao (Dominican Republic)	2–1	(Jamaica) Harbour View
Parra 23'; Heredia 32' (pen.)	Report	Bradford 45+1'

Estadio Cibao, Santiago de los Caballeros
Referee: Yadel Martínez (Cuba)
