= 2026 CONCACAF Caribbean Cup =

Association football tournament

Tournament details
- Dates: 4 August – 5 December
- Teams: 10 (from 6 associations)

Tournament statistics
- Matches played: 24
- Goals scored: 48 (2 per match)
- Top scorer: (Jamaica) Javier Brown (4 goals)
- All statistics correct as of 28 October 2026.

The 2026 CONCACAF Caribbean Cup is the fourth edition of the CONCACAF Caribbean Cup, the first-tier annual international club football competition in the Caribbean region.

== Teams ==
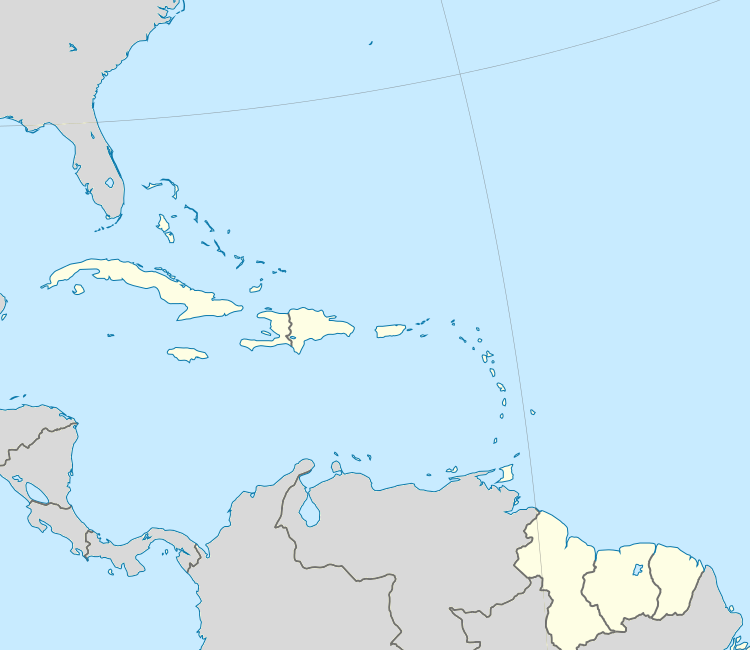
Location of teams of the 2026 CONCACAF Caribbean Cup

Ten teams from six CFU member associations qualified for the tournament. Eight teams from five nations qualified based on results from their domestic leagues. The remaining two teams qualified from the 2026 CFU Club Shield.

The entry berths were as follows:

- CFU Club Shield: 2 berths (champions and runners-up)
- Dominican Republic, Jamaica, Trinidad and Tobago: 2 berths
- Haiti, Suriname: 1 berth

Association	Team	Qualification method
Dominican Republic (2+1 berths)	Salcedo	2025–26 Liga Dominicana de Fútbol champions
Dominican Republic (2+1 berths)	Cibao	2025 Copa Dominicana de Fútbol champions
Dominican Republic (2+1 berths)	Delfines del Este	2026 CFU Club Shield runners-up
Jamaica (2+1 berths)	Portmore United	2025–26 Jamaica Premier League champions
Jamaica (2+1 berths)	Cavalier	2025–26 Jamaica Premier League runners-up
Jamaica (2+1 berths)	Mount Pleasant	2026 CFU Club Shield champions
Haiti (1 berth)	Violette	2025–26 D1 Special Championship champions
Suriname (1 berth)	Broki	2025–26 Suriname Major League champions
Trinidad and Tobago (2 berths)	Defence Force	2025–26 TT Premier Football League champions
Trinidad and Tobago (2 berths)	Club Sando	2025–26 TT Premier Football League runners-up

== Schedule ==
The schedule of the competition is as follows.

Stage	Round	First leg	Second leg
Group stage	Matchday 1	4–6 August	
Group stage	Matchday 2	18–20 August	
Group stage	Matchday 3	1–3 September	
Group stage	Matchday 4	8–10 September	
Group stage	Matchday 5	15–17 September	
Knockout stage	Semi-finals	13–14 October	22–28 October
Knockout stage	Final and third place play-off	1 December	5 December

== Group stage ==
In the group stage, each group was played on a home-and-away basis, where each club played every other club in their group once, two matches at home and two matches away.

The top two teams in each group advanced to the knockout stage.

=== Group A ===
Pos	Team	Pld	W	D	L	GF	GA	GD	Pts	Qualification	VAC	CSF	DEL	DEF	BRO
1	(Haiti) Violette	4	4	0	0	7	1	+6	12	Advance to semi-finals	—	1–0	—	3–0	—
2	(Trinidad and Tobago) Club Sando	4	2	1	1	4	2	+2	7	Advance to semi-finals	—	—	0–0	—	2–1
3	(Dominican Republic) Delfines del Este	4	1	2	1	3	2	+1	5		0–1	—	—	3–1	—
4	(Trinidad and Tobago) Defence Force	4	1	0	3	3	9	−6	3		—	0–2	—	—	2–1
5	(Suriname) Broki	4	0	1	3	3	6	−3	1		1–2	—	0–0	—	—

Source: CONCACAF
Rules for classification: 1) Points; 2) Goal difference; 3) Goals scored; 4) Head-to-head results (points, goal difference, goals scored); 5) Disciplinary points; 6) Drawing of lots.

=== Group B ===
Pos	Team	Pld	W	D	L	GF	GA	GD	Pts	Qualification	MTP	POR	SAL	CIB	CAV
1	(Jamaica) Mount Pleasant	4	2	1	1	4	3	+1	7	Advance to semi-finals	—	—	—	1–2	1–0
2	(Jamaica) Portmore United	4	2	0	2	5	4	+1	6	Advance to semi-finals	0–1	—	1–2	—	—
3	(Dominican Republic) Salcedo	4	1	3	0	4	3	+1	6		1–1	—	—	1–1	—
4	(Dominican Republic) Cibao	4	1	2	1	4	4	0	5		—	0–2	—	—	0–0
5	(Jamaica) Cavalier	4	0	2	2	0	3	−3	2		—	0–2	0–0	—	—

Source: CONCACAF
Rules for classification: 1) Points; 2) Goal difference; 3) Goals scored; 4) Head-to-head results (points, goal difference, goals scored); 5) Disciplinary points; 6) Drawing of lots.

== Knockout stage ==
The knockout stage is being played on a single-elimination tournament with the following rules:

- Each tie played on a home-and-away two-legged basis. The home team of the second leg in each tie was determined separately for each round as follows (Regulations Article 12.9):
  - In the semi-finals, the group winners hosted the second leg.
  - In the final, the higher-ranked team based on total points accumulated in the group stage and semi-finals will host the second leg.
- In the semi-finals, if tied on aggregate, the away goals rule was used. If still tied, the winners were determined by a penalty shoot-out.
- In the third place play-off and final, if tied on aggregate, the away goals rule will also be used. If still tied, 30 minutes of extra time will be played (without an away goals criteria). If still tied after extra time, the winner will be determined by a penalty shoot-out.

=== Qualified teams ===
The winners and runners-up of each of the four groups in the group stage advanced to the semi-finals.

Group	Winners	Runners-up
A	(Haiti) Violette	(Trinidad and Tobago) Club Sando
B	(Jamaica) Mount Pleasant	(Jamaica) Portmore United

=== Bracket ===
The bracket was pre-determined.

Semi-finals
(Haiti) Violette	1	2	3
(Jamaica) Portmore United	3	1	4
(Jamaica) Mount Pleasant	1	2	3
(Trinidad and Tobago) Club Sando	1	0	1

Final
(Jamaica) Portmore United
(Jamaica) Mount Pleasant
Third place
(Haiti) Violette
(Trinidad and Tobago) Club Sando

=== Semi-finals ===
The first legs were played on 13–15 October, and the second legs were played on 20–22 October 2026. Both winners qualified for the 2027 CONCACAF Champions Cup, with the champion receiving a bye to the round of 16. Semi-final pairings were determined based on the group stage standings, with the winner of Group A facing the runner-up of Group B (1A vs. 2B), and the winner of Group B facing the runner-up of Group A (1B vs. 2A). The group winners hosted the second leg.

==== Summary ====
Team 1	Agg.	Team 2	1st leg	2nd leg
Violette (Haiti)	3–4	(Jamaica) Portmore United	1–3	2–1
Mount Pleasant (Jamaica)	3–1	(Trinidad and Tobago) Club Sando	1–1	2–0

==== Matches ====
13 October 2026
20:00 (19:00 UTC−5)

Portmore United (Jamaica)	3–1	(Haiti) Violette
J. Brown 63', 74'; Bryan 90+5'	Report	Védrine 39'

Sabina Park, Kingston
Referee: Ricangel de Leça (Aruba)
28 October 2026
19:00 (18:00 UTC−5)

Violette (Haiti)	2–1	(Jamaica) Portmore United
Jeanty 73'; Jean 87'	Report	Bryan 21'

Sabina Park, Kingston (Note: The original match was scheduled for October 20 at Estadio Cibao FC in the Dominican Republic due to the ongoing suspension of Stade Sylvio Cator in Haiti. However, the match was postponed and moved to Sabina Park in Jamaica following the banning of Haitian football activities in the Dominican Republic after unrest in a Concacaf Nations League game.)
Referee: Kwinsi Williams (Trinidad and Tobago)

Portmore United won 4–3 on aggregate.

14 October 2026
20:00 (20:00 UTC−4)

Club Sando (Trinidad and Tobago)	1–1	(Jamaica) Mount Pleasant
David 56'	Report	W. Brown 11'

Hasely Crawford Stadium, Port of Spain
Referee: Norberto Da Silva (Curaçao)
22 October 2026
19:00 (18:00 UTC−5)

Mount Pleasant (Jamaica)	2–0	(Trinidad and Tobago) Club Sando
W. Brown 57'; Fuller 90+4'	Report

Sabina Park, Kingston
Referee: Shavin Greene (Guyana)

Mount Pleasant won 3–1 on aggregate.

=== Third place play-off ===
The third place play-off will be played over two legs on 1 and 5 December 2026. The winner will qualify for the 2027 CONCACAF Champions Cup, entering in the first round.

==== Summary ====
Team 1	Agg.	Team 2	1st leg	2nd leg
Club Sando (Trinidad and Tobago)	TPP	(Haiti) Violette	1 Dec	5 Dec

==== Matches ====
1 December 2026
16:00 (17:00 UTC−4)

Club Sando (Trinidad and Tobago)	v	(Haiti) Violette
	Report

Hasely Crawford Stadium, Port of Spain
5 December 2026
16:00 (16:00 UTC−4)

Violette (Haiti)	v	(Trinidad and Tobago) Club Sando
	Report

Hasely Crawford Stadium, Port of Spain

=== Final ===
The winner will qualify for the round of 16 of the 2027 CONCACAF Champions Cup, with the loser entering in the first round.

==== Summary ====
Team 1	Agg.	Team 2	1st leg	2nd leg
Portmore United (Jamaica)	F	(Jamaica) Mount Pleasant	1 Dec	5 Dec

==== Matches ====
1 December 2026
19:00 (20:00 UTC−4)

Portmore United (Jamaica)	v	(Jamaica) Mount Pleasant
	Report

Sabina Park, Kingston
5 December 2026
19:00 (19:00 UTC−5)

Mount Pleasant (Jamaica)	v	(Jamaica) Portmore United
	Report

Sabina Park, Kingston

== See also ==
- 2026 CONCACAF Champions Cup
- 2026 Leagues Cup
- 2026 CONCACAF Central American Cup
- 2026 CFU Club Shield
