= 2026 CONCACAF Caribbean Cup group stage =

Football group stage

The 2026 CONCACAF Caribbean Cup group stage was played from 4 August to 17 September 2026. A total of ten teams competed in the group stage to decide the four places in the knockout stage of the 2026 CONCACAF Caribbean Cup.

== Draw ==
The draw for the group stage was held on 26 May 2026 at 18:30 EDT (UTC−4) in Miami, Florida, United States. The ten involved teams were previously seeded into five pots of two teams each based on their CONCACAF Club Ranking as of 2 June 2025, except for the teams in pot 5, which was reserved for the champions and runners-up of the 2026 CFU Club Shield.

Pot	Team	Rank	Pts
1	(Haiti) Violette	77	1,083
1	(Dominican Republic) Cibao	81	1,057
2	(Trinidad and Tobago) Defence Force	82	1,051
2	(Jamaica) Cavalier	95	1,030
3	(Jamaica) Portmore United	97	1,029
3	(Trinidad and Tobago) Club Sando	128	998
4	(Dominican Republic) Salcedo	137	988
4	(Suriname) Broki	151	962
5	CFU Club Shield Champion	—	
5	CFU Club Shield Runner-Up	—	

Notes

1. ^{CCS} The identity of the champions and runners-up of the 2026 CFU Club Shield was not known at the time the pots were determined, as the tournament was scheduled to conclude in August 2026.

For the group stage, the ten teams were drawn into two groups (Groups A and B) of five containing a team from each of the five pots. Teams from pot 1 were drawn first and were placed in the first position of their group, starting with Group A and then Group B. The same procedure was followed for teams from pots 2, 3, 4 and 5, and they were placed in positions 2, 3, 4 and 5, respectively, within the group to which they were drawn. Each group could contain no more than two clubs from the same national association. No restrictions were applied at the time of drawing the groups.

The draw resulted in the following groups:

Group A
Pos	Team
A1	(Haiti) Violette
A2	(Trinidad and Tobago) Defence Force
A3	(Trinidad and Tobago) Club Sando
A4	(Suriname) Broki
A5	CFU Club Shield Runner-Up

Group B
Pos	Team
B1	(Dominican Republic) Cibao
B2	(Jamaica) Cavalier
B3	(Jamaica) Portmore United
B4	(Dominican Republic) Salcedo
B5	CFU Club Shield Champion

Notes

1. ^{CCS} The identity of the champions and runners-up of the 2026 CFU Club Shield was not known at the time of the draw, as the tournament was scheduled to conclude in August 2026.

== Format ==
In the group stage, each group was played on a single home-and-away round-robin basis, with teams playing against each other once, for a total of four matches per team (two home and two away). The teams were ranked according to the following criteria (Regulations Article 12.8.1).:

1. Points (3 points for a win, 1 point for a draw, and 0 points for a loss);
2. Goal difference;
3. Goals scored;
4. If two or more teams were still tied after applying the above criteria, their rankings were determined as follows:
  1. Points in the matches played among the tied teams;
  2. Goal difference in the matches played among the tied teams (if more than two teams were equal on points);
  3. Goals scored in the matches played among the tied teams (if more than two teams were equal on points);
  4. The lowest number of disciplinary points, based on the following criteria:
    1. Yellow card: plus 1 point;
    2. Second yellow card/indirect red card: plus 3 points;
    3. Direct red card: plus 4 points;;
    4. Yellow card and direct red card: plus 5 points;
5. Drawing of lots by CONCACAF.

The winners and runners-up of each group advanced to the semi-finals of the knockout stage.

== Schedule ==
Matches in the competition were played on either Tuesday, Wednesday, or Thursday as decided by CONCACAF. The schedule of each week was as follows (Regulations Article 2).

Weeks	Dates	Matches
Week 1	4–6 August	Team 1 vs. Team 2, Team 3 vs. Team 4
Week 2	18–20 August	Team 5 vs. Team 1, Team 2 vs. Team 4
Week 3	1–3 September	Team 4 vs. Team 5, Team 2 vs. Team 3
Week 4	8–10 September	Team 4 vs. Team 1, Team 3 vs. Team 5
Week 5	15–17 September	Team 1 vs. Team 3, Team 5 vs. Team 2

== Groups ==
All match times are in EDT (UTC−4) and local times, if different, are in parentheses as listed by CONCACAF.

=== Group A ===
Pos	Team	Pld	W	D	L	GF	GA	GD	Pts	Qualification	VAC	CSF	DEL	DEF	BRO
1	(Haiti) Violette	4	4	0	0	7	1	+6	12	Advance to semi-finals	—	1–0	—	3–0	—
2	(Trinidad and Tobago) Club Sando	4	2	1	1	4	2	+2	7	Advance to semi-finals	—	—	0–0	—	2–1
3	(Dominican Republic) Delfines del Este	4	1	2	1	3	2	+1	5		0–1	—	—	3–1	—
4	(Trinidad and Tobago) Defence Force	4	1	0	3	3	9	−6	3		—	0–2	—	—	2–1
5	(Suriname) Broki	4	0	1	3	3	6	−3	1		1–2	—	0–0	—	—

Source: CONCACAF
4 August 2026
20:00 (20:00 UTC−4)

Violette (Haiti)	3–0	(Trinidad and Tobago) Defence Force
Chéry 13'; Clifford 73'; Déjean 86'	Report

Estadio Cibao FC, Santiago de los Caballeros, Dominican Republic (Note: Violette played their home matches at Estadio Cibao FC in the Dominican Republic due to the ongoing suspension of Stade Sylvio Cator in Haiti.)
Referee: Sergio Rozenhaut (Suriname)
6 August 2026
18:00 (18:00 UTC−4)

Club Sando (Trinidad and Tobago)	2–1	(Suriname) Broki
Phillip 45+1' (pen.); Henry 65'	Report	Cairo 35'

Hasely Crawford Stadium, Port of Spain
Referee: Kimbell Ward (Saint Kitts and Nevis)

19 August 2026
20:00 (20:00 UTC−4)

Delfines del Este (Dominican Republic)	0–1	(Haiti) Violette
	Report	Déjean 51'

Estadio Cibao FC, Santiago de los Caballeros
Referee: Wasnah Shavan Barnarde (Antigua and Barbuda)
20 August 2026
18:00 (18:00 UTC−4)

Defence Force (Trinidad and Tobago)	2–1	(Suriname) Broki
Dillon 74', 82'	Report	Da Costa 35'

Hasely Crawford Stadium, Port of Spain
Referee: Jonathon Hughes (Cayman Islands)

1 September 2026
19:00 (19:00 UTC−4)

Defence Force (Trinidad and Tobago)	0–2	(Trinidad and Tobago) Club Sando
	Report	Phillip 24'; Hamilton 67'

Hasely Crawford Stadium, Port of Spain
Referee: José Corporán (Dominican Republic)
2 September 2026
18:00 (19:00 UTC−3)

Broki (Suriname)	0–0	(Dominican Republic) Delfines del Este
	Report

Dr. Ir. Franklin Essed Stadion, Paramaribo
Referee: Shavin Greene (Guyana)

8 September 2026
19:00 (19:00 UTC−4)

Club Sando (Trinidad and Tobago)	0–0	(Dominican Republic) Delfines del Este
	Report

Hasely Crawford Stadium, Port of Spain
Referee: Sanchez Bass (Saint Kitts and Nevis)
9 September 2026
19:00 (20:00 UTC−3)

Broki (Suriname)	1–2	(Haiti) Violette
Stein 90+5'	Report	Chéry 59'; Jeanty 90+3'

Dr. Ir. Franklin Essed Stadion, Paramaribo
Referee: Nikolai Nyron (Trinidad and Tobago)

15 September 2026
19:00 (19:00 UTC−4)

Violette (Haiti)	1–0	(Trinidad and Tobago) Club Sando
Ragoo 84' (o.g.)	Report

Estadio Cibao FC, Santiago de los Caballeros
Referee: Alexi Perry (Jamaica)
15 September 2026
19:00 (19:00 UTC−4)

Delfines del Este (Dominican Republic)	3–1	(Trinidad and Tobago) Defence Force
Almonte 14'; Gómez 26', 35'	Report	Garcia 81'

Estadio PUCMM, Santiago de los Caballeros
Referee: Okeito Nicholson (Jamaica)

=== Group B ===
Pos	Team	Pld	W	D	L	GF	GA	GD	Pts	Qualification	MTP	POR	SAL	CIB	CAV
1	(Jamaica) Mount Pleasant	4	2	1	1	4	3	+1	7	Advance to semi-finals	—	—	—	1–2	1–0
2	(Jamaica) Portmore United	4	2	0	2	5	4	+1	6	Advance to semi-finals	0–1	—	1–2	—	—
3	(Dominican Republic) Salcedo	4	1	3	0	4	3	+1	6		1–1	—	—	1–1	—
4	(Dominican Republic) Cibao	4	1	2	1	4	4	0	5		—	0–2	—	—	0–0
5	(Jamaica) Cavalier	4	0	2	2	0	3	−3	2		—	0–2	0–0	—	—

Source: CONCACAF
4 August 2026
18:00 (18:00 UTC−4)

Portmore United (Jamaica)	1–2	(Dominican Republic) Salcedo
J. Brown 50'	Report	J. Daniel 32'; Á. Gómez 44'

Hasely Crawford Stadium, Port of Spain
Referee: Ray Torres (Puerto Rico)
5 August 2026
20:00 (20:00 UTC−4)

Cibao (Dominican Republic)	0–0	(Jamaica) Cavalier
	Report

Estadio Cibao FC, Santiago de los Caballeros
Referee: Norberto Da Silva (Curaçao)

18 August 2026
18:00 (18:00 UTC−4)

Mount Pleasant (Jamaica)	1–2	(Dominican Republic) Cibao
Fuller 69'	Report	Ledesma 43'; Nichele 80'

National Stadium, Kingston
Referee: Nikolai Nyron (Trinidad and Tobago)
20 August 2026
20:00 (19:00 UTC−5)

Cavalier (Jamaica)	0–0	(Dominican Republic) Salcedo
	Report

National Stadium, Kingston
Referee: Moeth Gaymes (Saint Vincent and the Grenadines)

2 September 2026
20:00 (20:00 UTC−4)

Salcedo (Dominican Republic)	1–1	(Jamaica) Mount Pleasant
Ramos 49'	Report	W. Brown 7'

Estadio Cibao FC, Santiago de los Caballeros
Referee: Eric De La Cruz (Cuba)
3 September 2026
20:00 (19:00 UTC−5)

Cavalier (Jamaica)	0–2	(Jamaica) Portmore United
	Report	Grant 14'; J. Brown 88'

National Stadium, Kingston
Referee: Randy Encarnación (Dominican Republic)

9 September 2026
19:00 (18:00 UTC−5)

Portmore United (Jamaica)	0–1	(Jamaica) Mount Pleasant
	Report	Green 41'

National Stadium, Kingston
Referee: Amaury Majors (Bermuda)
10 September 2026
20:00 (20:00 UTC−4)

Salcedo (Dominican Republic)	1–1	(Dominican Republic) Cibao
Alegría 51'	Report	Nichele 60'

Estadio Cibao FC, Santiago de los Caballeros
Referee: Adonis Carrasco (Dominican Republic)

17 September 2026
19:00 (19:00 UTC−4)

Mount Pleasant (Jamaica)	1–0	(Jamaica) Cavalier
Fuller 39'	Report

National Stadium, Kingston
Referee: Ricangel de Leça (Aruba)
17 September 2026
19:00 (19:00 UTC−4)

Cibao (Dominican Republic)	1–2	(Jamaica) Portmore United
López 90' (pen.)	Report	Burke 31', 69'

Estadio Cibao FC, Santiago de los Caballeros
Referee: Reginald Gumbs (Saint Kitts and Nevis)
