= 2023 CONCACAF Caribbean Shield =

Tournament details
- Host country: St. Kitts and Nevis
- Dates: 3–13 August 2023
- Teams: 16 (from 16 associations)

Final positions
- Champions: (Suriname) Robinhood (2nd title)
- Runners-up: (Martinique) Golden Lion
- Third place: (Trinidad and Tobago) Club Sando
- Fourth place: (Puerto Rico) Metropolitan

Tournament statistics
- Matches played: 25
- Goals scored: 106 (4.24 per match)
- Top scorer(s): (Suriname) Shaquille Cairo (10 goals)

The 2023 CONCACAF Caribbean Shield was the sixth edition of the CONCACAF Caribbean Shield, the second-tier annual international club football competition in the Caribbean region, held amongst clubs whose football associations are affiliated with the Caribbean Football Union (CFU), a sub-confederation of CONCACAF.

Bayamón, having won the title in 2022, were the title holders, but did not qualify since they lost in the 2022 Liga Puerto Rico Apertura semifinals against Puerto Rico Sol.

Robinhood won their second title, defeating Golden Lion in the final. Both finalists qualified to the 2023 CONCACAF Caribbean Cup.

== Teams ==
Among the 31 CFU member associations, 16 of them are classified and each may enter one team in the CONCACAF Caribbean Shield.

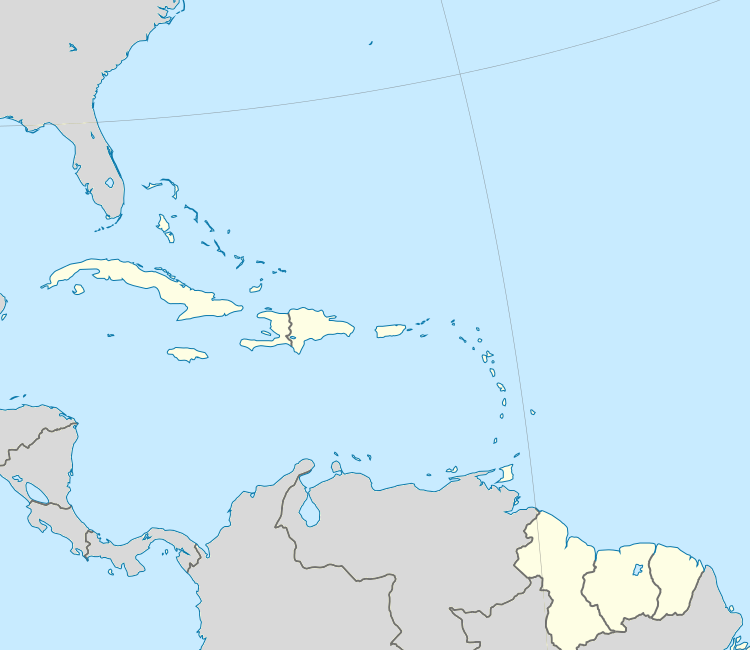
Location of teams of the 2023 CONCACAF Caribbean Shield
(H): Hosts

Association	Team	Qualification method	App. (last)	Previous best (last)
Aruba	Dakota	2021–22 Aruban Division di Honor champions	2nd (2019)	Consolation matches (2019)
Cayman Islands	Scholars International	2022 Cayman Islands Premier League champions	4th (2022)	Consolation matches (2019)
Curaçao	Jong Holland	2022 Curaçao Promé Divishon champions	3rd (2022)	Third place (2019)
Dominica	South East	2022 Dominica Premier League champions	4th (2022)	Group stage (2022)
Dominican Republic	O&M	2022 Liga Dominicana de Fútbol non-finalists with 2nd best aggregate record in regular season and Liguilla	1st	Debut
French Guiana	Étoile Matoury	2021–22 French Guiana Régional 1 best record in regular season	1st	Debut
Guadeloupe	Solidarité-Scolaire	2021–22 Guadeloupe Division of Honor champions	1st	Debut
Jamaica	Waterhouse	2022 National Premier League fourth place	1st	Debut
Martinique	Golden Lion	2021–22 Martinique Championnat National champions	2nd (2022)	Group stage (2022)
Puerto Rico	Metropolitan	2022–23 Liga Puerto Rico Apertura champions	3rd (2021)	Group stage (2021)
Saint Kitts and Nevis (H)	St. Paul's United	2021-22 SKNFA Premier League champions	2nd (2021)	Group stage (2022)
Saint Lucia	B1 FC	2022 SLFA First Division champions	1st	Debut
Saint Martin	Junior Stars	2021-22 Saint-Martin Senior League champions	2nd (2022)	Group stage (2022)
Suriname	Robinhood	2022 SVB Eerste Divisie champions	2nd (2019)	Champions (2019)
Trinidad and Tobago	Club Sando	2023 TT Premier Football League third place	1st	Debut
Turks and Caicos Islands	SWA Sharks	2021/22 Provo Premier League champions	2nd (2022)	Group stage (2022)

(H): Hosts

Notes

1. French Guiana (GUF): The 2021–22 French Guiana Régional 1 was abandoned. Since AS Étoile Matoury finished with the best record in league, they clinched a spot to the tournament.

== Group stage ==
In the group stage, each group is played on a round-robin basis with teams playing against each other once, for a total of three matches per team.

After single round-robin play, the group winners (four teams in total) will advance to the Semifinals.

The Semifinal winners (two clubs) will dispute the tournament's final and secure a berth in the 2023 CONCACAF Caribbean Cup, which will serve as an opportunity to qualify for the 2024 CONCACAF Champions Cup.

All match times are in AST (UTC−4) and local times are in parentheses, as listed by CONCACAF.

=== Group A ===
Pos	Team	Pld	W	D	L	GF	GA	GD	Pts	Qualification
1	(Puerto Rico) Metropolitan	3	3	0	0	7	0	+7	9	Advance to Semi-finals
2	(Curaçao) Jong Holland	3	2	0	1	4	4	0	6	
3	(Saint Kitts and Nevis) St. Paul's United (H)	3	0	1	2	2	5	−3	1	
4	(Collectivity of Saint Martin) Junior Stars	3	0	1	2	2	6	−4	1	

Source: CONCACAF
(H) Hosts
3 August 2023
17:00

Junior Stars (Collectivity of Saint Martin)	1–2	(Curaçao) Jong Holland
Bellechasse 24'	Report	Roosje 45+2'; Rosa 71'

Warner Park Sporting Complex, Basseterre
3 August 2023
19:45

St. Paul's United (Saint Kitts and Nevis)	0–2	(Puerto Rico) Metropolitan
	Report	Soriano 55'; Pito 61'

SKNFA Technical Center, Saint Peter

5 August 2023
17:00

Junior Stars (Collectivity of Saint Martin)	0–3	(Puerto Rico) Metropolitan
	Report	López 41', 68'; Díaz 53'

SKNFA Technical Center, Saint Peter
5 August 2023
19:45

St. Paul's United (Saint Kitts and Nevis)	1–2	(Curaçao) Jong Holland
Phipps 44'	Report	Derks 53'; Rosa 58'

SKNFA Technical Center, Saint Peter

7 August 2023
17:00

Jong Holland (Curaçao)	0–2	(Puerto Rico) Metropolitan
	Report	Soriano 29'; Pito 90+3'

Warner Park Sporting Complex, Basseterre
7 August 2023
17:00

St. Paul's United (Saint Kitts and Nevis)	1–1	(Collectivity of Saint Martin) Junior Stars
Clarke 3'	Report	Bellechasse 66'

SKNFA Technical Center, Saint Peter

=== Group B ===
Pos	Team	Pld	W	D	L	GF	GA	GD	Pts	Qualification
1	(Martinique) Golden Lion	2	2	0	0	15	1	+14	6	Advance to Semi-finals
2	(Cayman Islands) Scholars International	2	1	0	1	2	4	−2	3	
3	(Dominica) South East	2	0	0	2	1	13	−12	0	
4	(Jamaica) Waterhouse	0	0	0	0	0	0	0	0	Withdrew

Source: CONCACAF
3 August 2023
17:00

South East (Dominica)	0–2	(Cayman Islands) Scholars International
	Report	Garcia 21'; Finn 69'

SKNFA Technical Center, Saint Peter

5 August 2023
17:00

South East (Dominica)	1–11	(Martinique) Golden Lion
Prince 23'	Report	Singama 9'; Catherine 33'; Parsemain 45+3', 50' (pen.); Lamasine 60', 76', 79'; Faucher 68', 82', 90'; Boriel 70'

Warner Park Sporting Complex, Basseterre

7 August 2023
14:15

Scholars International (Cayman Islands)	0–4	(Martinique) Golden Lion
	Report	Boriel 8'; Lamasine 62', 79'; Faucher 90'

SKNFA Technical Center, Saint Peter

=== Group C ===
Pos	Team	Pld	W	D	L	GF	GA	GD	Pts	Qualification
1	(Suriname) Robinhood	3	3	0	0	11	3	+8	9	Advance to Semi-finals
2	(French Guiana) Étoile Matoury	3	2	0	1	8	5	+3	6	
3	(Dominican Republic) O&M	3	1	0	2	10	6	+4	3	
4	(Saint Lucia) B1 FC	3	0	0	3	2	17	−15	0	

Source: CONCACAF
4 August 2023
17:00

B1 FC (Saint Lucia)	0–4	(French Guiana) Étoile Matoury
	Report	Soga 5'; Benice 8'; Andrews 36'; Galimo 44'

SKNFA Technical Center, Saint Peter
4 August 2023
19:45

O&M (Dominican Republic)	1–2	(Suriname) Robinhood
Jamesley 71'	Report	Cairo 65', 73'

SKNFA Technical Center, Saint Peter

6 August 2023
14:15

O&M (Dominican Republic)	1–2	(French Guiana) Étoile Matoury
Jamesley 20'	Report	Soga 23'; Haabo 80'

Warner Park Sporting Complex, Basseterre
6 August 2023
17:00

B1 FC (Saint Lucia)	0–5	(Suriname) Robinhood
	Report	Rosebel 21'; Cairo 35', 45'; Don 74'; Da Silva 86'

Warner Park Sporting Complex, Basseterre

8 August 2023
17:00

Étoile Matoury (French Guiana)	2–4	(Suriname) Robinhood
Haabo 21', 71' (pen.)	Report	Rigters 16', 33'; Cairo 47'; Da Silva 88'

Warner Park Sporting Complex, Basseterre
8 August 2023
17:00

O&M (Dominican Republic)	8–2	(Saint Lucia) B1 FC
Jamesley 10', 57', 60', 76'; Hernández 21'; Paredes 26'; Guerrero 55', 63'	Report	Remy 79' (pen.); St. Ange 90'

SKNFA Technical Center, Saint Peter

=== Group D ===
Pos	Team	Pld	W	D	L	GF	GA	GD	Pts	Qualification
1	(Trinidad and Tobago) Club Sando	3	3	0	0	16	0	+16	9	Advance to Semi-finals
2	(Aruba) Dakota	3	2	0	1	3	3	0	6	
3	(Guadeloupe) Solidarité-Scolaire	3	0	1	2	1	6	−5	1	
4	(Turks and Caicos Islands) SWA Sharks	3	0	1	2	1	12	−11	1	

Source: CONCACAF
4 August 2023
14:15

Dakota (Aruba)	2–0	(Turks and Caicos Islands) SWA Sharks
Peña 40'; de Sousa 55'	Report

Warner Park Sporting Complex, Basseterre
4 August 2023
17:00

Club Sando (Trinidad and Tobago)	4–0	(Guadeloupe) Solidarité-Scolaire
Corbin 51'; Kesar 69', 79'; Thompson 87'	Report

Warner Park Sporting Complex, Basseterre

6 August 2023
17:00

Club Sando (Trinidad and Tobago)	9–0	(Turks and Caicos Islands) SWA Sharks
Dillon 17', 19', 41'; Forbes 34'; Gill 45+2', 64', 90'; Kesar 47'; Phillip 55'	Report

SKNFA Technical Center, Saint Peter
6 August 2023
19:45

Dakota (Aruba)	1–0	(Guadeloupe) Solidarité-Scolaire
Marte 61'	Report

SKNFA Technical Center, Saint Peter

8 August 2023
14:15

Club Sando (Trinidad and Tobago)	3–0	(Aruba) Dakota
Williams 12'; Dillon 61'; Thompson 82'	Report

SKNFA Technical Center, Saint Peter
8 August 2023
14:15

SWA Sharks (Turks and Caicos Islands)	1–1	(Guadeloupe) Solidarité-Scolaire
Louisy 20'	Report	Foggea 4'

Warner Park Sporting Complex, Basseterre

== Knockout stage ==
=== Bracket ===
Semi-finals
11 August – Saint Peter
(Suriname) Robinhood	5
(Puerto Rico) Metropolitan	0
11 August – Saint Peter
(Trinidad and Tobago) Club Sando	1
(Martinique) Golden Lion	2

Final
13 August – Saint Peter
(Suriname) Robinhood	5
(Martinique) Golden Lion	1
Third place
13 August – Saint Peter
(Puerto Rico) Metropolitan	1
(Trinidad and Tobago) Club Sando	6

=== Semi-finals ===
11 August 2023
16:00

Robinhood (Suriname)	5–0	(Puerto Rico) Metropolitan
Cairo 41', 72', 75'; Andro 45'; Da Silva 69' (pen.)	Report

SKNFA Technical Center, Saint Peter

11 August 2023
19:00

Club Sando (Trinidad and Tobago)	1–2	(Martinique) Golden Lion
Jones 45'	Report	Bellance 12'; Parsemain 24'

SKNFA Technical Center, Saint Peter

=== Third place match ===
13 August 2023
16:00

Metropolitan (Puerto Rico)	1–6	(Trinidad and Tobago) Club Sando
Ferrer 39'		Phillip 11'; Thomas 32'; Kesar 45'; Dillon 66', 68', 89'

SKNFA Technical Center, Saint Peter

=== Final ===
13 August 2023
19:00

Robinhood (Suriname)	5–1	(Martinique) Golden Lion
Andro 26'; Cairo 37', 39'; Rigters 72'; Adipi 77' (pen.)		Lamasine 68'

SKNFA Technical Center, Saint Peter

== Goalscorers ==
Team eliminated for this round.
Team inactive for this round.

Rank	Player	Team	GS1	GS2	GS3	SF	3rd	F	Total
1	(Suriname) Shaquille Cairo	(Suriname) Robinhood	2	2	1	3		2	10
2	(Trinidad and Tobago) Nicholas Dillon	(Trinidad and Tobago) Club Sando		3	1		3		7
3	(Haiti) Daniel Jamesley	(Dominican Republic) O&M	1	1	4				6
3	(Martinique) Alvyn Lamasine	(Martinique) Golden Lion		3	2			1	6
5	(Saint Lucia) Kenterly Faucher	(Martinique) Golden Lion		3	1				4
5	(Trinidad and Tobago) Ezekiel Kesar	(Trinidad and Tobago) Club Sando	2	1			1		4
7	(Brazil) Carlos Da Silva	(Suriname) Robinhood		1	1	1			3
7	(Trinidad and Tobago) Real Gill	(Trinidad and Tobago) Club Sando		3					3
7	(Suriname) Cerezo Haabo	(French Guiana) Étoile Matoury		1	2				3
7	(Martinique) Kévin Parsemain	(Martinique) Golden Lion		2		1			3
7	(Suriname) Jamilhio Rigters	(Suriname) Robinhood			2			1	3
12	11 players tied with 2 goals								2
