= Haabo =

Haabo is a surname. Notable people with the surname include:

- Cerezo Haabo (born 1994), Surinamese footballer
- Jules Haabo (born 1997), French Guianan footballer
