= 2016–17 TT Pro League =

TT Pro League
- Season: 2016–17
- Champions: Central FC; 3rd Pro League title 3rd T&T title
- CFU Club Championship: Central FC; W Connection
- Matches played: 90
- Goals scored: 314 (3.49 per match)
- Top goalscorer: Akeem Roach 12 goals
- Biggest home win: W Connection 7-0 Point Fortin Civic (25 October 2016)
- Biggest away win: St. Ann's Rangers 0–6 Central (28 January 2017); Point Fortin Civic 0–6 Defence Force (4 February 2017)
- Highest scoring: Defence Force 7-2 Point Fortin Civic (6 December 2016)

The 2016–17 TT Pro League season (known as the Digicel Pro League for sponsorship reasons) is the eighteenth season of the TT Pro League, the Trinidad and Tobago professional league for association football clubs, since its establishment in 1999. A total of ten teams are contesting the league, with Central FC the defending champions from the 2015–16 season. The league started on 29 September 2016 and ended on the 5 February 2017 with the crowning of the champion. On 5 February 2017, Central FC made history as they won their 3rd consecutive Pro League title, the only team to make such a feat.

== Changes from the 2015–16 season ==
North East Stars merged with Ma Pau S.C. to form Ma Pau Stars. Ma Pau S.C. had last appeared in the 2010–11 season.

== Teams ==
=== Team summaries ===
Location of the 2016–17 TT Pro League teams

Note: Flags indicate national team as has been defined under FIFA eligibility rules. Players may hold more than one non-FIFA nationality.

Team	Location	Stadium	Capacity	Manager	Captain
Central FC	California	Ato Boldon Stadium	10,000	(Trinidad and Tobago) Dale Saunders	(Trinidad and Tobago) Darren Mitchell
Club Sando	San Fernando	Mahaica Oval Pavilion	2,500	(Trinidad and Tobago) Angus Eve	(Trinidad and Tobago) Teba McKnight
Defence Force	Chaguaramas	Hasely Crawford Stadium	27,000	(Trinidad and Tobago) Marvin Gordon	(Trinidad and Tobago) Corey Rivers
Ma Pau Stars	Sangre Grande	Hasely Crawford Stadium	27,000	(Trinidad and Tobago) Ross Russell	(Trinidad and Tobago) Carlos Edwards
Morvant Caledonia United	Morvant/Laventille	Larry Gomes Stadium	10,000	(Trinidad and Tobago) Rajesh Latchoo	(Trinidad and Tobago) Stephan David
Point Fortin Civic	Point Fortin	Mahaica Oval Pavilion	2,500	(Trinidad and Tobago) Christopher Furlonge	(Trinidad and Tobago) Kelvin Modeste
Police	Saint James	Manny Ramjohn Stadium	10,000	(Trinidad and Tobago) Richard Hood	(Trinidad and Tobago) Trent Noel
San Juan Jabloteh	San Juan	Hasely Crawford Stadium	27,000	(Trinidad and Tobago) Keith Jeffrey	(Jamaica) Damion Williams
St. Ann's Rangers	San Juan	Hasely Crawford Stadium	27,000	(Trinidad and Tobago) Anthony Streete	(Trinidad and Tobago) Terrence Lewis
W Connection	Point Lisas	Manny Ramjohn Stadium	10,000	(Saint Lucia) Stuart Charles-Fevrier	(Saint Kitts and Nevis) Gerard Williams

== Stadiums ==
Since the teams do not play in their set home stadium, these are the stadiums that were used to host the matches throughout the season.

Place	Stadium	No. of matches hosted
1	Ato Boldon Stadium	33
2	Hasely Crawford Stadium	15
3	Mahaica Oval, Point Fortin	14
4	Larry Gomes Stadium	10
5	Barataria Recreational Ground, Barataria	8
6	Mannie Ramjohn Stadium	4
7	Morvant Recreational Ground, Morvant	2
7	Naparima College Ground	2
9	Brian Lara Recreation Ground, Santa Cruz	1
9	Hasely Crawford Stadium training field	1

== League table ==
Pos	Team	Pld	W	D	L	GF	GA	GD	Pts	Qualification
1	Central (C, Q)	18	15	2	1	41	14	+27	47	2018 CFU Club Championship First Round
2	W Connection (Q)	18	15	1	2	50	13	+37	46	2018 CFU Club Championship First Round
3	San Juan Jabloteh	18	9	2	7	32	23	+9	29	
4	Ma Pau Stars	18	8	4	6	33	29	+4	28	
5	Club Sando	18	7	4	7	33	34	−1	25	
6	Defence Force	18	7	2	9	30	30	0	23	
7	Police	18	5	5	8	36	35	+1	20	
8	St. Ann's Rangers	18	4	5	9	23	39	−16	17	
9	Morvant Caledonia United	18	2	6	10	19	32	−13	12	
10	Point Fortin Civic	18	1	3	14	17	65	−48	6	

Updated to match(es) played on 27 May 2017. Source: TT Pro League
Rules for classification: 1) points; 2) goal difference; 3) number of goals scored.
(C) Champions; (Q) Qualified for the phase indicated

=== Positions by round ===
Leader
2018 CFU Club Championship First round

The table lists the positions of teams after each week of matches. In order to preserve chronological evolvements, any postponed matches are not included to the round at which they were originally scheduled, but added to the full round they were played immediately afterwards. For example, if a match is scheduled for the tenth round of matches, but then postponed and played between rounds 16 and 17, it will be added to the standings for round 16.

Team ╲ Round	1	2	3	4	5	6	7	8	9	10	11	12	13	14	15	16	17	18
Central FC	4	1	1	1	1	1	1	1	1	1	1	1	1	1	1	1	1	1
W Connection	6	8	6	3	3	3	2	2	2	2	2	2	2	2	2	2	2	2
San Juan Jabloteh	5	5	2	2	2	2	3	3	3	3	3	3	3	3	3	3	3	3
Ma Pau Stars	10	7	3	5	5	4	5	4	5	4	4	5	5	4	4	4	4	4
Club Sando	7	9	10	8	8	8	6	6	4	5	6	6	8	6	6	5	5	5
Defence Force	9	6	8	9	9	9	7	8	8	6	5	4	4	5	5	6	6	6
Police	1	2	4	6	6	7	9	7	6	7	7	7	6	7	7	7	7	7
St. Ann's Rangers	3	4	7	4	4	5	4	5	7	8	8	8	7	8	8	8	8	8
Morvant Caledonia United	2	3	5	7	7	6	8	9	9	9	9	9	9	9	9	9	9	9
Point Fortin Civic	8	10	9	10	10	10	10	10	10	10	10	10	10	10	10	10	10	10

Updated to match(es) played on 22 May 2017. Source: TT Pro League

== Results ==
=== Matches 1–18 ===
Home \ Away	CEN	CSA	DFO	MPS	MCU	PFC	POL	SJJ	SAR	WCO	CEN	CSA	DFO	MPS	MCU	PFC	POL	SJJ	SAR	WCO
Central FC		2–1	4–1	0–0	2–1	3–0	2–1	2–1	3–2	2–1				0–2						
Club Sando	1–1		3–2	3–5	3–3	3–2	2–1	0–1	3–1	1–3										
Defence Force	1–2	2–0			1–1	7–2	0–2	2–1	0–2	1–4										
Ma Pau Stars		2–2	0–1		1–0	3–1	1–5	1–1		0–2			2–0							
Morvant Caledonia	0–2	0–1	1–1	0–2		2–2	1–3	2–4	2–0	0–3										
Point Fortin Civic	1–4	0–2	0–6 (Note: The Point Fortin vs Defence Force match was not completed due to technical issues at the venue. The result was taken after 62 mins.)	0–2	1–3		2–2	4–2	0–4	0–4										
Police	0–3	2–4	3–1	4–4	1–1	5–0		2–3	1–1	1–3										
San Juan Jabloteh	0–1	2–0	1–2	1–0	1–0	5–1	3–1		1–1	0–3										
St. Ann's Rangers	0–6	3–3	0–2	0–3	1–1	1–1	2–0	0–5		0–1				5–3						
W Connection	1–2	2–1	2–0	4–2	3–1	7–0	2–2	1–0	4–0											

Updated to match(es) played on 27 May 2017. Source: TT Pro League
Legend: Blue = home team win; Yellow = draw; Red = away team win.

== Season statistics ==
=== Top scorers ===
Rank	Player	Club	Goals
1	(Trinidad and Tobago) Akeem Roach	Club Sando	12
2	(Grenada) Jamal Charles	W Connection	10
2	(Trinidad and Tobago) Jameel Perry	Police	10
4	(Trinidad and Tobago) Darren Mitchell	Central	9
4	(Trinidad and Tobago) Devorn Jorsling	Defence Force	9
6	(Trinidad and Tobago) Jerrel Britto	Ma Pau Stars	8
6	(Trinidad and Tobago) Jason Scotland	Ma Pau Stars	8
6	(Trinidad and Tobago) Hashim Arcia	Defence Force	8
6	(Suriname) Dimitrie Apai	W Connection	8
10	(Trinidad and Tobago) Jamille Boatswain	Defence Force	7
