= Austin FC record by opponent =

Austin FC competition record

Austin FC is an American professional men's soccer club based in Austin, Texas. The club competes in Major League Soccer (MLS) as a member of the Western Conference. Founded in 2018, the club began play in the 2021 season. Their home stadium is Q2 Stadium in north Austin. In addition to participating in MLS, Austin FC participates in U.S. Open Cup, Leagues Cup, and the CONCACAF Champions League.

== All-time league record ==
Statistics correct as of match played on November 7, 2026.

Austin FC league record by opponent
	Home				Away				Total								
Club	Pld	W	D	L	Pld	W	D	L	Pld	W	D	L	GF	GA	Win%		
Club	Atlanta United FC	1	0	1	0	1	1	0	0	2	1	1	0	4	Win%	1	50.00
CF Montreal	1	1	0	0	2	1	0	1	3	2	0	1	4	3	66.66		
Charlotte FC	1	0	1	0	2	1	0	1	3	1	1	1	2	3	33.33		
Colorado Rapids	7	1	4	2	7	3	0	4	14	4	4	6	11	17	28.57		
Columbus Crew	1	0	1	0	0	0	0	0	1	0	1	0	0	0	0.00		
DC United	2	2	0	0	2	2	0	0	4	4	0	0	11	4	100.00		
FC Cincinnati	1	1	0	0	1	0	0	1	2	1	0	1	6	2	50.00		
FC Dallas	8	3	2	3	8	0	2	6	16	3	5	9	12	24	18.75		
Houston Dynamo FC	7	5	1	1	7	2	0	5	14	7	1	6	19	20	50.00		
Inter Miami CF	1	1	0	0	2	0	2	0	3	1	2	0	8	4	33.33		
LA Galaxy	6	3	1	2	6	1	0	5	12	4	1	7	11	17	33.33		
Los Angeles FC	7	2	2	3	6	2	1	3	13	4	3	6	13	19	30.77		
Minnesota United FC	6	2	1	3	7	3	2	2	13	5	3	5	10	14	38.46		
Nashville SC	2	0	1	1	3	1	0	2	5	1	1	3	4	9	20.00		
New England Revolution	1	0	1	0	1	0	1	0	2	0	2	0	2	2	0.00		
New York City FC	1	1	0	0	0	0	0	0	1	0	1	0	2	2	0.00		
New York Red Bulls	2	1	0	1	1	0	1	0	3	1	1	1	6	6	33.33		
Orlando City SC	1	0	1	0	1	0	0	1	2	0	1	2	2	4	0.00		
Philadelphia Union	2	0	2	0	0	0	0	0	2	0	2	0	3	3	0.00		
Portland Timbers	7	2	1	4	6	2	1	3	13	4	2	7	13	18	30.77		
Real Salt Lake	6	2	2	2	6	1	0	5	12	3	2	7	13	19	25.00		
St. Louis City SC	4	1	1	2	4	1	0	3	8	2	1	5	11	18	25.00		
San Diego FC	2	1	1	0	1	0	0	1	4	1	1	2	5	11	25.00		
San Jose Earthquakes	6	2	3	1	6	0	3	3	12	2	6	4	20	27	16.67		
Seattle Sounders FC	6	2	1	3	6	2	3	1	12	4	4	4	9	13	33.33		
Sporting Kansas City	6	5	0	1	6	3	1	3	13	8	1	4	15	16	61.53		
Toronto FC	1	1	0	0	2	0	1	1	3	1	1	1	4	3	33.33		
Vancouver Whitecaps FC	6	1	2	3	6	1	1	4	12	2	3	7	10	16	16.67		

== All-time MLS Cup record ==
Statistics correct as of match played on November 2, 2025.

Austin FC MLS Cup record by opponent
	Home				Away				Total									
Club	Pld	W	D	L	Pld	W	D	L	Pld	W	D	L	GF	GA	Win%	Ref(s)		
Club	FC Dallas	1	1	0	0	0	0	0	0	1	1	0	0	2	Win%	Ref(s)	1	100.00
Los Angeles FC	1	0	0	1	2	0	0	2	3	0	0	3	2	9	0.00			
Real Salt Lake	1	1	0	0	0	0	0	0	1	1	0	0	2	2	100.00			

== All-time CONCACAF Champions League record ==
Statistics correct as of match played on March 14, 2023.

Austin FC CONCACAF Champions Record record by opponent
	Home				Away				Total									
Club	Pld	W	D	L	Pld	W	D	L	Pld	W	D	L	GF	GA	Win%	Ref(s)		
Club	(Haiti) Violette	1	1	0	0	1	0	0	1	2	1	0	1	2	Win%	Ref(s)	3	50.00

== All-time Leagues Cup record ==
Statistics correct as of match played on August 26, 2026.

Austin FC CONCACAF Champions Record record by opponent
	Home				Away				Total									
Club	Pld	W	D	L	Pld	W	D	L	Pld	W	D	L	GF	GA	Win%	Ref(s)		
Club	(Mexico) América	1	0	1	0	0	0	0	0	1	0	1	0	1	Win%	Ref(s)	1	0.00
(Mexico) Juárez	1	0	0	1	0	0	0	0	1	0	0	1	1	3	0.00			
(United States) Los Angeles FC	0	0	0	0	1	0	0	1	1	0	0	1	0	2	0.00			
(Mexico) Mazatlán	1	0	0	1	0	0	0	0	1	0	0	1	1	3	0.00			
(Mexico) Monterrey	1	1	0	0	0	0	0	0	1	1	0	0	2	0	100.00			
(Mexico) Puebla	1	1	0	0	0	0	0	0	1	1	0	0	3	0	100.00			
(Mexico) Tijuana	1	1	0	0	0	0	0	0	1	1	0	0	2	0	100.00			
(Mexico) Toluca	0	0	0	0	1	0	0	1	1	0	0	1	0	2	0.00			
(Mexico) UNAM	1	1	0	0	0	0	0	0	1	1	0	0	3	2	100.00			

== All-time U.S. Open Cup record ==
Statistics correct as of match played on April 14, 2026.

Austin FC U.S. Open Cup record by opponent
	Home				Away				Total									
Club	Pld	W	D	L	Pld	W	D	L	Pld	W	D	L	GF	GA	Win%	Ref(s)		
Club	Chicago Fire FC	1	0	0	1	0	0	0	0	1	0	0	1	0	Win%	Ref(s)	2	0.00
El Paso Locomotive FC	1	1	0	0	0	0	0	0	1	1	0	0	3	2	100.00			
Houston Dynamo FC	1	1	0	0	0	0	0	0	1	1	0	0	3	1	100.00			
Louisville City FC	0	0	0	0	1	0	0	1	1	0	0	1	1	2	0.00			
Minnesota United FC	0	0	0	0	1	1	0	0	1	1	0	0	2	1	100.00			
Nashville SC	1	0	0	1	0	0	0	0	1	0	0	1	1	2	0.00			
New Mexico United	1	1	0	0	0	0	0	0	1	1	0	0	2	0	100.00			
San Antonio FC	0	0	0	0	1	0	0	1	1	0	0	1	1	2	0.00			
San Jose Earthquakes	0	0	0	0	1	0	1	0	1	0	1	0	2	2	100.00 (Note: Austin advanced in shoot–out win)			
