= Las Caobas =

Las Caobas, is a place located in the municipality Santo Domingo Oeste, in the Dominican Republic. Also known as Las Caobas De Herrera, Its geographical coordinates are 19° 35' 0" North, 70° 14' 0" West.

== Notable residents ==
- Adonis Carrasco (born 1993), FIFA football referee
