= B1 FC =

Saint Lucian football club

- Full name: B1 Football Club
- Founded: 2015; 11 years ago
- Ground: Marchand Playing Field
- Manager: Emily Remy
- League: SLFA First Division
- 2022: 1st
- Website: Website

B1 FC is a Saint Lucian football club based in Marchand, Castries that currently competes in the SLFA First Division. The club also fields successful youth sides.

== History ==
B1 FC was founded in 2015. In 2017, the club competed in the SLFA President's Cup with the winner earning a spot in the SLFA First Division. By 2021, the club was competing in the SLFA Second Division. The club won the 2022 SLFA First Division under the guidance of head coach Emily Remy. In the process, Remy became the first female coach to win the league. As winners of the 2022 SLFA First Division, B1 FC represented Saint Lucia in the 2023 CONCACAF Caribbean Shield.

== International competition ==
Results list B1 FC's goal tally first.

Competition	Round	Club	Score
2023 CONCACAF Caribbean Shield	Group Stage	(French Guiana) Étoile Matoury	0–4
2023 CONCACAF Caribbean Shield	Group Stage	(Suriname) Robinhood	0–5
2023 CONCACAF Caribbean Shield	Group Stage	(Dominican Republic) O&M	2–8
