= Akeem Roach =

Trinidad and Tobago footballer

Personal information
- Full name: Akeem Garnet Roach
- Date of birth: 9 December 1995 (age 30)
- Position: Forward

Team information
- Current team: Real Sociedad
- Number: 10

Senior career*
Years	Team	Apps	(Gls)
2014–2016	Defence Force		
2016–2017	Club Sando		
2017	Vida	11	(3)
2018–2019	Mosta	22	(3)
2022–	Real Sociedad		

International career^{‡}
2016–	Trinidad and Tobago	4	(1)
- * Club domestic league appearances and goals as of 18:24, 8 February 2022 (UTC) ‡ National team caps and goals as of 18:51, 28 June 2018 (UTC)

Akeem Garnet Roach (born 9 December 1995) is a Trinidadian international footballer who plays for Real Sociedad, as a striker.

== Career ==
Roach has played club football for Defence Force, Club Sando, Vida, Mosta, and Real Sociedad.

He made his international debut for Trinidad and Tobago in 2016.
