= Adonis Carrasco =

Dominican football referee (born 1993)

- Full name: Adonis Carrasco García
- Born: 9 March 1993 (age 33); Santo Domingo, Dominican Republic
- Other occupation: Physical education teacher

Domestic
Years	League	Role
2018–	Liga Dominicana de Fútbol	Referee

International
Years	League	Role
2023–	FIFA listed	Referee

Adonis Carrasco García (born 9 March 1993) is a football referee from the Dominican Republic, who has been an international FIFA-listed referee since 2023.

== Career ==
Carrasco was born in Las Palmas de Herrera, Santo Domingo Province, and played basketball for his entire childhood and youth, taking part in national tournaments for the Club of El Millón, Las Caobas Club, and Avanzada Juvenil. He also reached the Torneo Superior de Baloncesto with the team of the Intituto de formación docente Salome Ureña (ISFODOSU), where he studied physical education. As a professional basketball player, he usually played as a small forward.

Carrasco said that he "stumbled upon" a recruitment call for football referees while studying at the ISFODOSU and that he had only a little knowledge of the sport. He said that he had never played a football match, but jokingly added that he signed up for the course because "[one] never knows what you are going to live on." He added that upon finishing his first training week, he felt refereeing as a "first-sight love", highlighting the pressure in football games and the respect earned by footballers as a motivation to pursue a professional career. Carrasco's mentor was local female referee Felícita Rodríguez, who taught him the rules of football and made him watch matches to take notes. In his own words, Carrasco later looked at Rodríguez as if she were his own mother.

The first match for Carrasco was not at a local level, but at the 2018 Caribbean Club Shield in his native country, where he was selected to take part of refereeing due to lack of officials coming for the tournament. His most important game at the competition was a semifinal between Inter Moengotapoe and SV Deportivo Nacional at the Estadio Cibao FC in Santiago de los Caballeros.

After the 2018 Caribbean Club Shield, he was noticed by the Liga Dominicana de Fútbol (LDF) and by the regional CONCACAF, beginning to lead matches in qualifying tournaments for the FIFA U-17 World Cup and the FIFA U-20 World Cup. He was the first referee from the Dominican Republic to lead a final match at the CONCACAF Caribbean Cup by overseeing the first leg final of the 2023 edition between S.V. Robinhood and Cavalier F.C. at the Dr. Ir. Franklin Essed Stadion in Paramaribo.

Other competitions for Carrasco came afterwards, including the Dallas Cup, the CONCACAF Champions Cup, the CONCACAF Central American Cup, and FIFA World Cup qualifiers for CONCACAF. He was also named LDF's Referee of the Year in 2022 and 2024, with his first game at his local league being a match between Atlántico FC and Delfines del Este FC. In 2023, he was also assigned for the men's tournament at the 2023 Central American and Caribbean Games in San Salvador.

In 2025, Carrasco was selected for the CONCACAF Gold Cup and the 2025 FIFA U-17 World Cup, where he led two group stage matches: Group H game between Indonesia and Zambia, and Group I match between Czechia and Burkina Faso.
