= SKNFA Technical Center =

Sports venue in Basseterre, Saint Kitts and Nevis

Coordinates: 17.3233°N 62.7274°W

SKNFA Technical Center Stadium
- Interactive map of SKNFA Technical Center Stadium
- Location: Basseterre, Saint Kitts and Nevis
- Capacity: 2,000
- Surface: artificial turf

Construction
- Built: 2016–2022
- Cost: EC$ 3.5 million
- General contractors: Lennox Warner and Partner Construction Company

Tenants
- SKNFA Premier League; Saint Kitts and Nevis national team

The Saint Kitts and Nevis Football Association Technical Center is located in the Saint Peter Basseterre Parish of the Caribbean island nation of Saint Kitts and Nevis. The center serves as the technical headquarters of the St. Kitts and Nevis Football Association while the country's first Goal Project, the Football House, serves as the administrative center.

The complex also contains the SKNFA Football Center Stadium which hosts matches of the SKNFA Premier League and the Saint Kitts and Nevis national football team as well as being the home of the National Football Academy.

== History ==
The official groundbreaking ceremony of the technical center was held on 22 June 2013 as the second of FIFA's Goal Projects in the country. The ceremony was attended by President of CONCACAF & Vice President of FIFA Jeffrey Webb, President of the Caribbean Football Union Gordon Derrick, and other government dignitaries. Construction was completed in many phases. The construction contract was awarded to Lennox Warner and Partner Construction Company with an estimated cost of EC$ 3.5 million. Phase One saw the construction of a lecture hall to accommodate up to one hundred people, audi-video facilities, a medical room, library archive, national hall of fame, fitness facilities, and accommodations to house two football teams. Phase Two would include the construction of two full-size football pitches. In March 2017 it was estimated that 80% of the construction on the main structure of the project was complete.

By March 2016 the project was entering Phase Two of construction. Local contractor Kelly Construction began laying the artificial turf surfaces and installation of lighting and fences in July 2021. By June 2022 the artificial turf surfaces had been laid and retaining walls were completed. Soon after completion, the stadium co-hosted matches of the 2023 CONCACAF Caribbean Shield, along with the Warner Park Sporting Complex.
