= 2025–26 Liga Dominicana de Fútbol =

Liga Dominicana de Fútbol
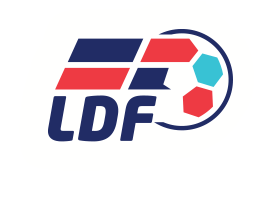
- Season: 2025-26
- Champions: Salcedo FC (first title)
- CONCACAF Caribbean Cup: Salcedo FC; Cibao FC
- CFU Club Shield: Atlético Pantoja: Delfines del Este
- Matches: 141
- Top goalscorer: Daniel Jamesley (25)

The 2025–26 season of the Liga Dominicana de Fútbol was the 11th season of Association football in the Dominican Republic. On 4 August 2025, The LDF Board of Directors announced the 2025-26 tournament would be dedicated to the late José Rafael Abinader, who founded O&M FC and helped promote university and professional football. On 8 August 2025, the season officially kicked-off with Matchday 1 featuring the Country's Clasico del Norte, a rivalry between then defending champions of both the 2024 Liga Dominicana de Fútbol season & 2025 Copa Dominicana de Fútbol Cibao FC and Moca FC.

== Competition system ==
The Liga Dominicana de Fútbol tournament consists of three parts:

- Regular Season: The competition format will have a regular three-round phase, with a minimum of eighteen matches for all clubs. The six best qualifiers from the regular phase go to the Liguilla, in a round-robin format. From there, the best four teams advance to the semifinals, with their winners going to the grand final of the LDF 2026, all of which have 2-legged matches.

The order of classification of the teams will be determined in a general calculation table, as follows:

- 1) Higher number of points;
- 2) Greater goal difference in favor; in case of equality;
- 3) Higher number of goals scored; in case of equality;
- 4) Highest number of away goals scored; in case of equality;
- 5) Fewest red cards received; in case of equality;
- 6) Fewest yellow cards received; in case of equality;
- 7) Draw.
- Liguilla: The six teams classified from the regular season will play a system of all against all. Each team will play a total of five matches in their own field and in the opposite field, making a total of three rounds. The top four teams at the end of the League will advance to the Play-offs. The ranking order will be the same as for the Regular Season.
- Play-offs: An elimination system will be played, the first place in the Liguilla will face the fourth place and the second place will face the third. Both keys will be played in two games and the winners will advance to the Grand Final, which will also be played in two games.

== Participating Clubs ==
A total of 10 clubs participated for the 2025–26 season. However, due to FIFA's decision to sanction Atletico San Cristobal and have them relegated to the Liga Dominicana de Fútbol Expansion, The LDF revamped the system to align to a league with 9 clubs. All future matches for and against San Cristobal would end as a 0–3 loss for the remainder of the season.

=== Teams by Province ===
Province	N.º	Teams
Distrito Nacional	5	Club Atlético Pantoja, O&M FC, Delfines del Este FC
La Vega	2	Atlético Vega Real & Jarabacoa FC
Puerto Plata	1	Atlántico FC
San Cristóbal	1	Atlético San Cristóbal
Santiago Province	1	Cibao FC
Espaillat	1	Moca FC
Hermanas Mirabal	1	Salcedo FC

=== Team Information ===
Team	Manager	City	Stadium	Capacity	Established	Sponsors	Uniforms
Atlántico FC	(Venezuela) Miguel Ángel Acosta	Puerto Plata	Estadio Leonel Plácido	2,000	2015	(Dominican Republic) Ocean World (Dominican Republic) Farmacia Popular	(Dominican Republic) Batu Wear
Atlético Pantoja	(Argentina) Alejandro Trionfini	Santo Domingo	Félix Sánchez Olympic Stadium	27,000	1999	(Dominican Republic) Banco BHD (Dominican Republic) Laboratorios Rowe	(Peru) Walon Sport
Atlético San Cristóbal	(Venezuela) Johannes Hernández	San Cristóbal	Estadio Panamericano	2,800	2015	(China) Loncin Holdings	(Dominican Republic) Batú Wear
Atlético Vega Real	(Cuba) Raul Gonzalez	La Vega	Estadio Olímpico	7,000	2014	(Dominican Republic) Angloamericana de Seguros (Dominican Republic) Alaver	(Dominican Republic) LAF Sport
Cibao FC	(Argentina) Gabriel Martínez Poch	Santiago de los Caballeros	Estadio Cibao FC	8,000	2015	(Dominican Republic) Banreservas	(Germany) Puma
Moca FC	(Venezuela) Jean Carlos Güell	Moca	Estadio Complejo Deportivo Moca 86	2,000	1971	PETS Animal Feed	(Dominican Republic) Batú Wear
Delfines del Este FC	(Dominican Republic) Edward Acevedo	Santo Domingo Este	Parque del Este	1,200	2014	(Dominican Republic) Banco Popular	(Mexico) Bee Sport
O&M FC	(Spain) Jose Aparacio	Santo Domingo	Félix Sánchez Olympic Stadium	27,000	1974	(Dominican Republic) Universidad Dominicana O&M	(Dominican Republic) HEB
Salcedo FC	(Dominican Republic) Arturo Berroa	Salcedo	Estadio Domingo Polonia	2,000	1992	(Dominican Republic) JUMBO	(Dominican Republic)
Jarabacoa FC	(Colombia) Carlos Echeverry	Jarabacoa	Estadio Junior Mejia	1,500	1992	(Dominican Republic)	(United States) Diaza Sportswear

== League table ==
Pos	Team	Pld	W	D	L	GF	GA	GD	Pts	Qualification or relegation
1	Atlético Pantoja	18	14	1	3	32	11	+21	43	Advance to Liguilla
2	Cibao	18	13	2	3	37	11	+26	41	Advance to Liguilla
3	Salcedo	18	9	5	4	33	22	+11	32	Advance to Liguilla
4	Delfines del Este	18	7	6	5	31	20	+11	27	Advance to Liguilla
5	Moca	18	6	6	6	21	21	0	24	Advance to Liguilla
6	Universidad O&M	18	6	5	7	29	26	+3	23	Advance to Liguilla
7	Atlántico FC	18	6	4	8	25	28	−3	22	
8	Atlético Vega Real	18	6	2	10	24	26	−2	20	
9	Jarabacoa	18	4	5	9	16	25	−9	17	
10	Atlético San Cristóbal	18	0	2	16	5	63	−58	2	

Source: FlashFootball

== Liguilla ==
Pos	Team	Pld	W	D	L	GF	GA	GD	Pts	Qualification or relegation
1	Cibao	15	8	6	1	22	11	+11	30	Advance to Semi-finals
2	Delfines del Este	15	7	5	3	19	12	+7	26	Advance to Semi-finals
3	Salcedo	15	6	5	4	20	17	+3	23	Advance to Semi-finals
4	Atlético Pantoja	15	4	7	4	22	18	+4	19	Advance to Semi-finals
5	Moca	15	3	5	7	12	19	−7	14	
6	Universidad O&M	15	1	4	10	16	34	−18	7	

Source: FlashFootball

== Semi-finals ==
=== Summary ===
The first leg was played on 2 and 3 May 2024 and the second leg was played on 9 and 10 May 2026.

Team 1	Agg.	Team 2	1st leg	2nd leg
Cibao	2–1	Atlético Pantoja	1–0	1–1
Delfines del Este	2–2 (2–4 p)	Salcedo	0–1	2–1

=== Matches ===
First Leg

2 May 2026
16:00 UTC-3

Atlético Pantoja	0–1	Cibao

Estadio Olímpico Félix Sánchez

Second Leg

10 May 2024
18:00 UTC-3

Cibao	1–1	Atlético Pantoja

Estadio Cibao FC

First Leg

3 May 2026
16:00 UTC-3

Salcedo	1–0	Delfines del Este

Estadio Domingo Polonia

Second Leg

9 May 2026
15:30 UTC-3

Delfines del Este	2–1	Salcedo
Penalties
	2–4

Estadio Parque del Este

== Final ==
The 2026 Liga Dominicana de Fútbol Gran Final marked a special historical event in the league's 11-year history, with Salcedo FC being the second team to qualify for the Finals in their first ever professional season (Atletico de San Francisco in 2018). The first-leg match took place on Sunday, 17 May 2026 at the Estadio Domingo Polonia in Salcedo, Hermanas Mirabal. The second-leg concluding the season on 24 May 2026 at Cibao FC Stadium in Santiago de Los Caballeros.

Team 1	Agg.	Team 2	1st leg	2nd leg
Cibao	2–3	Salcedo	0–2	2–1

17 May 2026
16:00 UTC−3

Salcedo	2–0	Cibao
J. Daniel 45+1'; Reyes 69'	Report

Estadio Domingo Polonia, Salcedo
Referee: Carlos Mateo
24 May 2026
18:00 UTC−3

Cibao	2–1	Salcedo
Roces 76'; Correa 88'	Report	Correa 90+1' (o.g.)

Estadio Cibao FC
Referee: Randy Encarnacion
