= Woodensky Pierre =

Haitian footballer (born 2004)

Personal information
- Full name: Olivier Woodensky Pierre
- Date of birth: 30 December 2004 (age 21)
- Place of birth: Cité Soleil, Haiti
- Height: 1.80 m (5 ft 11 in)
- Position: Defensive midfielder

Team information
- Current team: Violette AC
- Number: 27

Youth career
- Violette AC

Senior career*
Years	Team	Apps	(Gls)
2021–2023	Violette AC		
2024–2025	Real Hope FA		
2025–2026	Violette AC		
2026-	Forge FC		

International career^{‡}
2022	Haiti U20	4	(0)
2026–	Haiti	1	(0)
- * Club domestic league appearances and goals ‡ National team caps and goals as of 31 March 2026

Olivier Woodensky Pierre (born 30 December 2004) is a Haitian footballer who plays as a defensive midfielder for Canadian Premier League team Forge FC and the Haiti national team.

== Club career ==
Born in Cité Soleil, Pierre was a youth product of Violette AC.

In October 2024, Pierre signed for Real Hope FA.

Pierre returned to Violette AC after one season. There, he won both Série d'Ouverture and the Série de Clôture with the team in the 2025–26 Ligue Haïtienne. He was also named as the Best Player of the Série de Clôture.

In August 2026, Pierre signed for Canadian Premier League side Forge FC.

== International career ==
Pierre received his first call-up to the Haiti senior national team in March 2026, for the friendly matches against Tunisia and Iceland. He made his international debut on 31 March against Iceland, coming in as a substitute for the injured Leverton Pierre in the 37th minute.

In May 2026, Pierre was named in Haiti's final 26-men squad for the 2026 FIFA World Cup. He was the only Haitian player in the country's domestic league to be selected.
