= 2023 CONCACAF Caribbean Cup =

Association football tournament

Tournament details
- Dates: 23 August – 7 December
- Teams: 10 (from 5 associations)

Final positions
- Champions: (Suriname) Robinhood (1st title)
- Runners-up: (Jamaica) Cavalier
- Third place: (Dominican Republic) Moca
- Fourth place: (Jamaica) Harbour View

Tournament statistics
- Matches played: 28
- Goals scored: 69 (2.46 per match)
- Top scorer(s): (Jamaica) Shaniel Thomas (8 goals)
- Best player(s): (Suriname) Renske Adipi
- Best young player: (Suriname) Jonathan Fonkel
- Best goalkeeper: (Suriname) Jonathan Fonkel

The 2023 CONCACAF Caribbean Cup was the first edition of the CONCACAF Caribbean Cup, the first-tier annual international club football competition in the Caribbean region. It was contested by clubs whose football associations are affiliated with the Caribbean Football Union (CFU), a sub-confederation of CONCACAF.

The winners of the 2023 CONCACAF Caribbean Cup qualified to the 2024 CONCACAF Champions Cup Round of 16, and the second and third place teams qualified to Round One.

== Teams ==
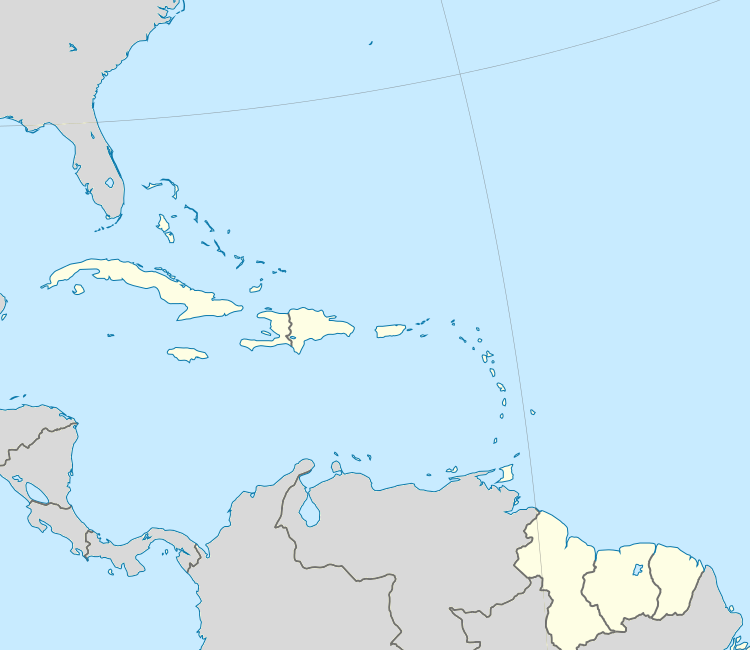
Location of teams of the 2023 CONCACAF Caribbean Cup

Ten teams from five CFU member associations qualified for the football tournament. Eight teams from three nations qualified based on results from their domestic leagues and the remaining two teams qualified from the 2023 CONCACAF Caribbean Shield.

Originally, Haiti had two berths reserved for its teams in the tournament. However, the CONCACAF Council decided that Haitian clubs were not able to qualify and participate in the tournament as their domestic league is inactive since May 2021 due to the ongoing Haitian crisis. As a result, the two Haitian berths were awarded one to Dominican Republic and one to Jamaica based on the performance of their clubs in the past five editions of the defunct Caribbean Club Championship.

The entry berths were as follows:

- CONCACAF Caribbean Shield: 2 berths (champions and runners-up)
- Dominican Republic and Jamaica: 3 Berths
- Trinidad and Tobago: 2 berths

Association	Team	Qualification method
Dominican Republic (3 berths)	Cibao	2022 Liga Dominicana de Fútbol champions
Dominican Republic (3 berths)	Atlético Pantoja	2022 Liga Dominicana de Fútbol runners-up
Dominican Republic (3 berths)	Moca	2022 Liga Dominicana de Fútbol non-finalists with best aggregate record in regular season and Liguilla
Jamaica (3 berths)	Harbour View	2022 National Premier League champions
Jamaica (3 berths)	Dunbeholden	2022 National Premier League runners-up
Jamaica (3 berths)	Cavalier	2022 National Premier League third place
Martinique (0+1 berth)	Golden Lion	2023 CONCACAF Caribbean Shield runners-up
Suriname (0+1 berth)	Robinhood	2023 CONCACAF Caribbean Shield champions
Trinidad and Tobago (2 berths)	Port of Spain	2023 TT Premier Football League first placed team as 2 June 2023
Trinidad and Tobago (2 berths)	Defence Force	2023 TT Premier Football League second placed team as 2 June 2023

Notes

1. Trinidad and Tobago (TRI): 2023 TT Premier Football League ends on 17 June 2023. Since CONCACAF announced Trinidadian teams will be confirmed on 28 May the top 2 placed teams as 2 June 2023 are qualified to the competition.

== Draw ==
The draw for the group stage was held on 8 June 2023 at 17:00 EDT (UTC−4) in Miami, Florida, United States. The 10 involved teams were previously seeded into five pots of two teams each based on their CONCACAF Club Ranking as of 28 May 2023, except for the teams in pot 5, which was reserved for the champions and runners-up of the 2023 CONCACAF Caribbean Shield.

Pot	Team	Rank	Pts
1	(Dominican Republic) Cibao	87	1,056
1	(Trinidad and Tobago) Defence Force	105	1,029
2	(Jamaica) Cavalier	108	1,025
2	(Dominican Republic) Atlético Pantoja	114	1,020
3	(Dominican Republic) Moca	119	1,016
3	(Jamaica) Harbour View	130	1,006
4	(Jamaica) Dunbeholden	131	1,006
4	(Trinidad and Tobago) Port of Spain	159	946
5	(Suriname) Robinhood	—	
5	(Martinique) Golden Lion	—	

Notes

1. ^{CCS} The identity of the champions (Robinhood) and runners-up (Golden Lion) of the 2023 CONCACAF Caribbean Shield was not known at the time the pots were determined.

== Schedule ==
The schedule of the competition was as follows.

Stage	Round	First leg	Second leg
Group Stage	Matchday 1	23–25 August	
Group Stage	Matchday 2	29–31 August	
Group Stage	Matchday 3	19–21 September	
Group Stage	Matchday 4	26–28 September	
Group Stage	Matchday 5	3–5 October	
Knockout	Semifinals	24–26 October	31 October – 2 November
Knockout	Finals and 3rd place	28–30 November	5–7 December

== Group stage ==
In the group stage, each group was played on a home-and-away basis, where each club played every other club in their group once, two matches at home and two matches away.

The first and second-place finishers advanced to the knockout stage.

=== Group A ===
Pos	Team	Pld	W	D	L	GF	GA	GD	Pts	Qualification	CAV	MOC	DFO	GLI	POS
1	(Jamaica) Cavalier	4	3	1	0	11	4	+7	10	Advance to semi-finals	—	3–0	—	—	2–1
2	(Dominican Republic) Moca	4	3	0	1	6	3	+3	9	Advance to semi-finals	—	—	—	3–0	1–0
3	(Trinidad and Tobago) Defence Force	4	1	2	1	3	4	−1	5		1–1	0–2	—	—	—
4	(Martinique) Golden Lion	4	1	0	3	5	11	−6	3		2–5	—	0–1	—	—
5	(Trinidad and Tobago) Port of Spain	4	0	1	3	4	7	−3	1		—	—	1–1	2–3	—

Source: CONCACAF
Rules for classification: 1) Points; 2) Goal difference; 3) Goals scored; 4) Head-to-head results (points, goal difference, goals scored); 5) Disciplinary points; 6) Drawing of lots.

=== Group B ===
Pos	Team	Pld	W	D	L	GF	GA	GD	Pts	Qualification	ROB	HAR	CIB	DUN	APA
1	(Suriname) Robinhood	4	3	0	1	8	4	+4	9	Advance to semi-finals	—	—	1–0	—	3–1
2	(Jamaica) Harbour View	4	2	1	1	6	5	+1	7	Advance to semi-finals	3–2	—	—	1–0	—
3	(Dominican Republic) Cibao	4	1	1	2	4	5	−1	4		—	2–1	—	—	1–1
4	(Jamaica) Dunbeholden	4	1	1	2	3	5	−2	4		0–2	—	2–1	—	—
5	(Dominican Republic) Atlético Pantoja	4	0	3	1	4	6	−2	3		—	1–1	—	1–1	—

Source: CONCACAF
Rules for classification: 1) Points; 2) Goal difference; 3) Goals scored; 4) Head-to-head results (points, goal difference, goals scored); 5) Disciplinary points; 6) Drawing of lots.

== Knockout stage ==
The knockout stage was played on a single-elimination tournament with the following rules:

- Each tie was played on a home-and-away two-legged basis. The home team of the second leg in each tie was determined separately for each round as follows (Regulations Article 12.9):
  - In the semi-finals, the group winners hosted the second leg.
  - In the finals, the higher-ranked team based on total points accumulated in the group stage and semi-finals hosted the second leg.
- In the semi-finals, if tied on aggregate, the away goals rule would be used. If still tied, the penalty shoot-out would be directly used to determine the winners (Regulations Article 12.8.2).
- In the third place play-offs and finals, if tied on aggregate, the away goals rule would also be used. If still tied, 30 minutes of extra time would be played but the away goals scored during this time would not serve as a tie-breaking criteria. If still tied after extra time, the penalty shoot-out would be used to determine the winner (Regulations Article 12.8.3).

=== Qualified teams ===
The winners and runners-up of each of the two groups in the group stage advanced to the quarter-finals.

Group	Winners	Runners-up
A	(Jamaica) Cavalier	(Dominican Republic) Moca
B	(Suriname) Robinhood	(Jamaica) Harbour View

=== Bracket ===
The bracket was pre-determined as follows.

Semi-finals
(Dominican Republic) Moca	1	0	1 (2)
(Suriname) Robinhood (p)	0	1	1 (3)
(Jamaica) Harbour View	0	0	0
(Jamaica) Cavalier	5	0	5

Finals
(Suriname) Robinhood	1	2	3
(Jamaica) Cavalier	0	0	0
Third place
(Jamaica) Harbour View	1	1	2
(Dominican Republic) Moca	2	1	3

=== Semi-finals ===
The first legs were played on 24–25 October, and the second legs were played on 31 October – 2 November 2023.

Team 1	Agg.	Team 2	1st leg	2nd leg
Harbour View (Jamaica)	0–5	(Jamaica) Cavalier	0–5	0–0
Moca (Dominican Republic)	1–1 (2–3 p)	(Suriname) Robinhood	1–0	0–1

=== Third place play-offs ===
Team 1	Agg.	Team 2	1st leg	2nd leg
Harbour View (Jamaica)	2–3	(Dominican Republic) Moca	1–2	1–1

=== Finals ===
Team 1	Agg.	Team 2	1st leg	2nd leg
Robinhood (Suriname)	3–0	(Jamaica) Cavalier	1–0	2–0

== Goalscorers ==
Team eliminated for this round.
Team inactive for this round.

Rank	Player	Team	GS1	GS2	GS3	GS4	GS5	SF1	SF2	TP1	TP2	F1	F2	Total
1	(Jamaica) Shaniel Thomas	(Jamaica) Cavalier	1		3		3	1						8
2	(Suriname) Shaquille Cairo	(Suriname) Robinhood		1	2	1	1							5
3	(Argentina) Gustavo Ascona	(Dominican Republic) Moca				1	1	1		1				4
4	(Jamaica) Shaqueil Bradford	(Jamaica) Harbour View				2	1							3
4	(Antigua and Barbuda) Jalmaro Calvin	(Jamaica) Cavalier		1			1	1						3
4	(Suriname) Jamilhio Rigters	(Suriname) Robinhood				1	1						1	3
7	(Martinique) Thierry Catherine	(Martinique) Golden Lion			1		1							2
7	(Trinidad and Tobago) Reon Moore	(Trinidad and Tobago) Defence Force	1	1										2
7	(Dominican Republic) Víctor Sánchez	(Dominican Republic) Moca				2								2
7	(Suriname) Franklin Singodikromo	(Suriname) Robinhood							1				1	2
7	(Jamaica) Omar Thompson	(Jamaica) Harbour View			1	1								2

== See also ==
- 2023 CONCACAF Central American Cup
- 2023 Leagues Cup
- 2024 CONCACAF Champions Cup
