= Liga Dominicana de Futbol Expansion =

Dominican association football league

Liga Dominicana de Fútbol Expansión
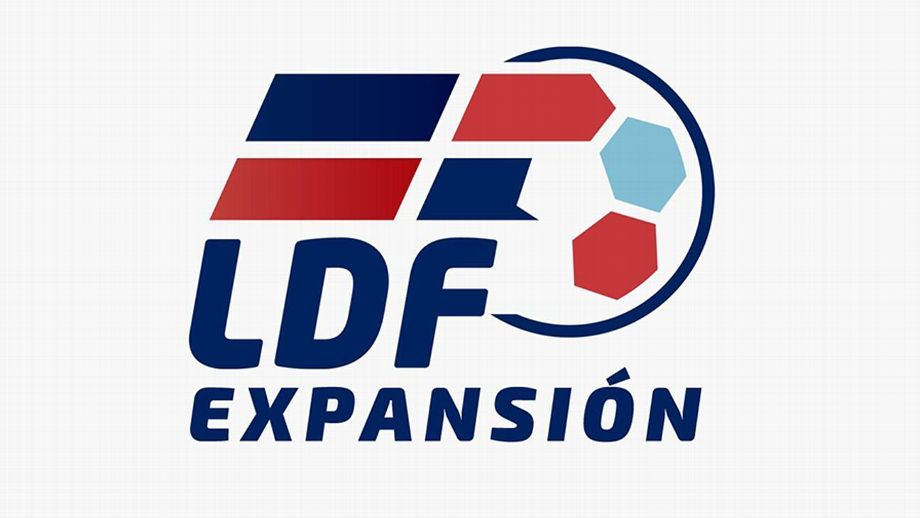
- Organising body: Dominican Football Federation
- Founded: 2022; 4 years ago
- Country: Dominican Republic
- Confederation: CONCACAF
- Level on pyramid: 2
- Relegation to: None
- Domestic cup: Copa Dominicana de Fútbol
- Current champions: Delfines del Este II (2025)
- Broadcaster(s): Domestic; CDN Deportes Live Streaming; YouTube: Canal official de Liga Dominicana de Fútbol
- Website: ligadominicanadefutbol.com
- Current: 2025 Liga Dominicana de Fútbol

The Liga Dominicana de Fútbol Expansión (LDF) refers to the strategic restructuring and professionalization of the football league system in the Dominican Republic. Initiated by the Dominican Football Federation (FEDOFUTBOL) and the LDF Board of Directors, the project transformed the league from a closed-franchise system into a multi-tiered professional structure with a formal second division, known as LDF Expansión, and a merit-based promotion and relegation system. The expansion reached its definitive phase during the 2025–26 season, which marked the league's alignment with the international FIFA calendar.

== History and Background ==
Since its inception in 2015, the LDF operated with a stable core of 8 to 10 founding franchises. While the league saw growth in viewership and infrastructure, the lack of a second tier limited the development of youth talent and regional clubs. In 2022, the LDF introduced a developmental "Expansión" tournament for U-23 players and reserve squads, which served as the precursor to a formal professional second division.

== 2025 Transition Tournament ==
In early 2025, the LDF launched a transitional "Copa de la LDF" to bridge the gap between the old summer format and the new autumn-to-spring international calendar. The tournament featured 12 clubs: the nine active first-division franchises and three invited clubs from the second tier selected for their institutional stability and infrastructure: Salcedo FC (Hermanas Mirabal) Santa Fe FC (Santo Domingo) CBA Santo Domingo (Santo Domingo).The tournament was won by Cibao FC, but its primary purpose was to evaluate expansion candidates for the 10th spot in the upcoming 2025–26 professional season.

== LDF Expansión (Second Division) ==
The LDF Expansión was officially formalized as the professional second tier of Dominican football in August 2025. For the 2025–26 season, the league featured 18 teams divided into two regional groups:

Liga Dominicana de Fútbol Expansión
Grupo A	Grupo B
Deportivo Santo Domingo DF	Delfines del Este FC
Cibao FC	Jarabacoa FC
Atlantico FC	Club Real Deportivo
Punta Cana FC	Atlético San Cristobal
A4 Sports Club	CBA Santo Domingo
Del Este FC	Vicente Noble FC
Moca FC	Atlético Vega Real
Atlético Pantoja	Salcedo FC
O&M FC	Santa Fe FC

== League Composition ==
The league includes a mix of independent clubs and affiliate (reserve) teams of first-division sides:Affiliate Teams: Cibao FC B, Moca FC B, Pantoja B, O&M FC B, etc. Independent Clubs: Santa Fe FC, CBA Santo Domingo, Punta Cana FC, A4 Sports, Real Deportivo, and Vicente Noble FC (debutant in 2025).The independent clubs compete for direct promotion to the LDF, while affiliate teams are ineligible for promotion to ensure competitive integrity.

== Promotion and Relegation ==
The 2025–26 cycle marked the first time in Dominican history that clubs moved between divisions based on sporting and administrative criteria. In May 2025, the LDF Board of Directors unanimously voted to promote Salcedo FC to the first division. The decision was based on the club's 7th-place finish in the Copa de la LDF (the highest among expansion teams) and its renovated stadium, the Estadio Domingo Polonia, which met professional standards.

== Relegation of Atlético San Cristóbal ==
In a landmark decision in November 2025, Atlético San Cristóbal became the first club to be formally relegated from the LDF. Following an investigation into match manipulation, FIFA and FEDOFUTBOL issued a sanction expelling the club from the remainder of the 2025–26 season and mandating its relegation to the LDF Expansión for the 2026–27 cycle.
