= 2023 CONCACAF Caribbean Cup knockout stage =

The 2023 CONCACAF Caribbean Cup knockout stage was played from 24 October to 6 December 2023. A total of 4 teams competed in the knockout stage to decide the champions of the 2023 CONCACAF Caribbean Cup.

== Qualified teams ==
The winners and runners-up of each of the two groups in the group stage advanced to the quarter-finals.

Group	Winners	Runners-up
A	(Jamaica) Cavalier	(Dominican Republic) Moca
B	(Suriname) Robinhood	(Jamaica) Harbour View

== Format ==
The knockout stage was played on a single-elimination tournament with the following rules:

- Each tie was played on a home-and-away two-legged basis. The home team of the second leg in each tie was determined separately for each round as follows (Regulations Article 12.9):
  - In the semi-finals, the group winners hosted the second leg.
  - In the finals, the higher-ranked team based on total points accumulated in the group stage and semi-finals hosted the second leg.
- In the semi-finals, if tied on aggregate, the away goals rule would be used. If still tied, the penalty shoot-out would be directly used to determine the winners (Regulations Article 12.8.2).
- In the third place play-offs and finals, if tied on aggregate, the away goals rule would also be used. If still tied, 30 minutes of extra time would be played but the away goals scored during this time would not serve as a tie-breaking criteria. If still tied after extra time, the penalty shoot-out would be used to determine the winner (Regulations Article 12.8.3).

== Bracket ==
The bracket of the final stages was determined as follows:

Round	Matchups
Semi-finals	(Group winner team host second leg): Match SF1: Group B runners-up vs. Group A winners; Match SF2: Group A runners-up vs. Group B winners
Third place play-offs	(Higher-ranked team host second leg): Loser SF1 vs. Loser SF2
Finals	(Higher-ranked team host second leg): Winner SF1 vs. Winner SF2

The bracket was pre-determined as follows.

Semi-finals
(Dominican Republic) Moca	1	0	1 (2)
(Suriname) Robinhood (p)	0	1	1 (3)
(Jamaica) Harbour View	0	0	0
(Jamaica) Cavalier	5	0	5

Finals
(Suriname) Robinhood	1	2	3
(Jamaica) Cavalier	0	0	0
Third place
(Jamaica) Harbour View	1	1	2
(Dominican Republic) Moca	2	1	3

== Semi-finals ==
=== Summary ===
The first legs were played on 24–25 October, and the second legs were played on 31 October – 2 November 2023.

Team 1	Agg.	Team 2	1st leg	2nd leg
Harbour View (Jamaica)	0–5	(Jamaica) Cavalier	0–5	0–0
Moca (Dominican Republic)	1–1 (2–3 p)	(Suriname) Robinhood	1–0	0–1

=== Matches ===
24 October 2023
20:00 (19:00 UTC−5)

Harbour View (Jamaica)	0–5	(Jamaica) Cavalier
	Report	Thomas 5'; Calvin 12'; Clarke 64' (o.g.); Laing 72'; Allen 87'

Sabina Park, Kingston
Referee: Yadel Martínez (Cuba)
31 October 2023
20:00 (19:00 UTC−5)

Cavalier (Jamaica)	0–0	(Jamaica) Harbour View
	Report

Sabina Park, Kingston
Referee: Shavin Greene (Guyana)

Cavalier won 5–0 on aggregate, advanced to the finals and qualified for the 2024 CONCACAF Champions Cup Round One at minimum. Harbour View advanced to the third place play-off.

25 October 2023
18:00

Moca (Dominican Republic)	1–0	(Suriname) Robinhood
Ascona 30' (pen.)	Report

Estadio Complejo Deportivo Moca 86, Moca
Referee: Kimbell Ward (St. Kitts and Nevis)
2 November 2023
20:00 (21:00 UTC−3)

Robinhood (Suriname)	1–0	(Dominican Republic) Moca
Singodikromo 90+3'	Report
Penalties
Rigters (penalty missed); Da Silva (penalty scored); Adipi (penalty missed); Muesa (penalty scored); Esajas (penalty scored)	3–2	(penalty scored) Dabas; (penalty missed) Francisco; (penalty missed) Valencia; (penalty missed) Vidal; (penalty scored) De La Rosa

Dr. Ir. Franklin Essed Stadion, Paramaribo
Referee: Reon Radix (Grenada)

Tied 1–1 on aggregate, Robinhood won on penalties, advanced to the finals and qualified for the 2024 CONCACAF Champions Cup Round One at minimum. Moca advanced to the third place play-off.

== Third place play-offs ==
In the third place play-offs, the team which had the better performances across all previous rounds (group stage and semi-finals) hosted the second leg.

Pos	Team	Pld	W	D	L	GF	GA	GD	Pts	Host
1	(Dominican Republic) Moca	6	4	0	2	7	4	+3	12	Second leg
2	(Jamaica) Harbour View	6	2	2	2	6	10	−4	8	First leg

Source: CONCACAF
Rules for classification: 1) Points; 2) Goal difference; 3) Goals scored; 4) Away goals scored; 5) Wins; 6) Away wins; 7) Disciplinary points (1 point for yellow card, 3 points for second yellow card/indirect red card, 4 points for direct red card, 5 points for yellow card and direct red card); 8) Drawing of lots (Regulations Article 12.11.4).

=== Summary ===
Team 1	Agg.	Team 2	1st leg	2nd leg
Harbour View (Jamaica)	2–3	(Dominican Republic) Moca	1–2	1–1

=== Matches ===
28 November 2023
18:00

Harbour View (Jamaica)	1–2	(Dominican Republic) Moca
Thomas 15' (o.g.)	Report	Ascona 43'; Francisco 65'

Sabina Park, Kingston
Referee: Ricangel de Leça (Aruba)
5 December 2023
18:00 (19:00 UTC−4)

Moca (Dominican Republic)	1–1	(Jamaica) Harbour View
Valencia 68'	Report	Stewart 65'

Estadio Cibao FC, Santiago de los Caballeros
Referee: Norberto Da Silva (Curaçao)

Moca won 3–2 on aggregate and qualified for the 2024 CONCACAF Champions Cup Round One.

== Finals ==
In the finals, the team which had the better performances across all previous rounds (group stage and semi-finals) hosted the second leg.

Pos	Team	Pld	W	D	L	GF	GA	GD	Pts	Host
1	(Jamaica) Cavalier	6	4	2	0	16	4	+12	14	Second leg
2	(Suriname) Robinhood	6	4	0	2	9	5	+4	12	First leg

Source: CONCACAF
Rules for classification: 1) Points; 2) Goal difference; 3) Goals scored; 4) Away goals scored; 5) Wins; 6) Away wins; 7) Disciplinary points (1 point for yellow card, 3 points for second yellow card/indirect red card, 4 points for direct red card, 5 points for yellow card and direct red card); 8) Drawing of lots (Regulations Article 12.11.4).

=== Summary ===
Team 1	Agg.	Team 2	1st leg	2nd leg
Robinhood (Suriname)	3–0	(Jamaica) Cavalier	1–0	2–0

=== Matches ===
30 November 2023
18:00 (20:00 UTC−3)

Robinhood (Suriname)	1–0	(Jamaica) Cavalier
Andro 69'	Report

Dr. Ir. Franklin Essed Stadion, Paramaribo
Referee: Adonis Carrasco (Dominican Republic)
6 December 2023
19:00

Cavalier (Jamaica)	0–2	(Suriname) Robinhood
	Report	Singodikromo 89'; Rigters 90+4'

National Stadium, Kingston
Referee: Kwinsi Williams (Trinidad and Tobago)

Robinhood won 3–0 on aggregate and qualified for the 2024 CONCACAF Champions Cup Round of 16.
