= Club Sando F.C. =

Association football club based in Couva, Trinidad and Tobago

Club Sando
- Founded: 1991; 35 years ago
- Ground: Ato Boldon Stadium, Couva
- Capacity: 10,000
- Manager: Angus Eve
- League: TT Pro League
- 2025–26: TT Pro League, 1st
Third colours

Club Sando Football Club is a professional football club from Trinidad and Tobago. The club are currently members of the TT Pro League and play at the Ato Boldon Stadium in Couva.

== History ==
Established in 1991, the club spent most of its years in the National Super League. They applied to join the TT Pro League for the 2014–15 season after finishing as runners up in the National Super League in 2013–14, but were rejected. However, after winning the Super League in 2014–15, they were granted access as they were deemed financially stable to the TT Pro League and finished in a respectable 7th place. In the 2016–17 TT Pro League they improved to finish 5th and made it to the 2017 Trinidad and Tobago Pro Bowl semifinal.

== Performance in CONCACAF competitions ==
The following is a list of results for Club Sando F.C. in international competitions. Club Sando F.C.'s scores are listed first.

| Year | Tournament | Round | Opponent | Home | Away | Agg. |
|---|---|---|---|---|---|---|
| 2023 | CONCACAF Caribbean Shield | Group Stage | (Guadeloupe) Solidarité-Scolaire | | 4–0 | |
| 2023 | CONCACAF Caribbean Shield | Group Stage | (Turks and Caicos Islands) SWA Sharks | | 9–0 | |
| 2023 | CONCACAF Caribbean Shield | Group Stage | (Aruba) Dakota | | 3–0 | |
| 2023 | CONCACAF Caribbean Shield | Semi-finals | (Martinique) Golden Lion | | 1–2 | |
| 2023 | CONCACAF Caribbean Shield | Third Place Match | (Puerto Rico) Metropolitan | | 6–1 | |
| 2026 | CONCACAF Caribbean Cup | Group Stage | (Suriname) Broki | 2–1 | | |
| 2026 | CONCACAF Caribbean Cup | Group Stage | (Trinidad and Tobago) Defence Force | | 2–0 | |
| 2026 | CONCACAF Caribbean Cup | Group Stage | (Dominican Republic) Delfines del Este | 0–0 | | |
| 2026 | CONCACAF Caribbean Cup | Group Stage | (Haiti) Violette | | 0–1 | |
| 2026 | CONCACAF Caribbean Cup | Semi-finals | (Jamaica) Mount Pleasant | 1–1 | 0–2 | 1–3 |
| 2026 | CONCACAF Caribbean Cup | Third Place Play-off | (Haiti) Violette | | | |

== Honours ==
- National Super League
  - Champions (1): 2014–15
