= Shaqueil Bradford =

Jamaican footballer (born 2000)

Personal information
- Full name: Shaqueil Edward George Bradford
- Date of birth: 6 December 2000 (age 25)
- Place of birth: Kingston, Jamaica
- Position: Forward

Team information
- Current team: Mount Pleasant
- Number: 18

Youth career
- Camperdown High School

Senior career*
Years	Team	Apps	(Gls)
2017–2019	Boys' Town	12	(1)
2019–2024	Waterhouse	61	(21)
2023	→ Scarborough SC (loan)		
2023–2024	→ Harbour View (loan)	7	(6)
2024–	Mount Pleasant	37	(13)

International career^{‡}
2023–	Jamaica	1	(0)
- * Club domestic league appearances and goals as of 27 August 2025 ‡ National team caps and goals as of 29 December 2023

Shaqueil Edward George Bradford (born 6 December 2000) is a Jamaican footballer who plays as a forward for Mount Pleasant.

== Schoolboy career ==
Bradford began playing football at the schoolboy level and was a standout at Camperdown High School. Known for his diminutive stature, Bradford made his debut in the Manning Cup at age 16, netting a hat-trick in the opening game of the 2017 season. He was named team captain for the 2019 season, scoring another hat-trick in what would be his final season at the school.

== Club career ==
=== Boys' Town ===
Bradford signed his first professional contract with his hometown club Boys' Town. While still a schoolboy, aged 17, he made his debut in the Jamaica Premier League, coming on as a substitute versus Tivoli Gardens in the 2017–18 season. Bradford was awarded his first senior start a week later against F.C. Reno, scoring and having an assist in the game. Bradford was described as 'one for the future' by head coach Andrew Price. Boys' Town was relegated at the end of the season, bringing an unfortunate end to Bradford's first season in Jamaica's top flight. He remained at the club after relegation, spending the 2018–19 season in the KSAFA Super League.

=== Waterhouse ===
Bradford was transferred to Waterhouse at the start of the 2019–20 season, making his return to the Jamaica Premier League. At Waterhouse, he became a regular starter and one of their main attacking threat, scoring several crucial goals for the club. Bradford received his first taste of regional football while at Waterhouse, featuring against Arcahaie of Haiti in the 2020 CONCACAF League and then against Canadian team Pacific in the 2022 CONCACAF League.

In 2022, Bradford went on a 15-day trial in Portugal at Campeonato de Portugal club Sertanense Futebol Clube.

=== Canada ===
In the summer of 2023, he had a spell abroad in the Canadian Soccer League with Scarborough SC. He would help the eastern Toronto side win the regular-season title.

=== Harbor View ===
Bradford was unveiled as a Harbour View player in the 2023–24 pre-season and was immediately selected for the 2023 CONCACAF Caribbean Cup squad. He scored his first brace in a regional competition at the Caribbean Cup, doing so versus S.V. Robinhood of Suriname in the group stage.

=== Mount Pleasant ===
Bradford signed with league rivals Mount Pleasant F.A. during the 2024 winter transfer market.

== International career ==
Bradford received his first call-up to Jamaica's national senior men's football team in November 2023 for an international friendly against Guatemala at the Red Bull Arena in Harrison, New Jersey. He featured as a substitute coming on for Romario Williams in the 93rd minute.

== Honors ==
=== Club ===
Scarborough SC

- Canadian Soccer League Regular Season: 2023

Waterhouse

- Jamaica Premier League runner-up: 2021

Individual

- 2021 Jamaica Premier League Golden Boot
- 2023 CONCACAF Caribbean Cup Group Stage Best XI
