= Violette AC =

Association football club in Haiti

Violette
- Full name: Violette Athletic Club
- Nickname: Le Vieux Tigre
- Founded: 18 May 1918; 108 years ago
- Ground: Stade Sylvio Cator
- Capacity: 20,000
- Coordinates: 18°32′9.81″N 72°20′32.79″W
- Chairman: Jean-Marie Fritz Henry
- Manager: Rony Attimy
Home colours	Away colours

Violette Athletic Club is a professional football club based in Port-au-Prince, Haiti.

== History ==
Violette is one of the most successful clubs in the country. In 1939, Violette A.C. captured the double after winning the league and the Coupe d'Haïti. They were awarded the 1984 CONCACAF Champions' Cup following the disqualification of two teams who had been planned to play a two-legged series to determine the North American participant in the final. The club was relegated to second division after the 2016 Ligue Haïtienne season.

The club has produced many Haitian international footballers, including Alexandre Boucicaut and Sebastien Vorbe. Their home stadium, Stade Sylvio Cator, was damaged during the 2010 earthquake and later reopened for use.

Violette won the 2021 Série d'Ouverture and qualified for the 2022 Caribbean Club Championship, which they won while playing all of their home matches at Estadio Cibao FC in Santiago de los Caballeros, Dominican Republic, due to the ongoing political crisis. They qualified for the 2023 CONCACAF Champions League and scheduled several friendlies to prepare for the competition, as the Ligue Haïtienne had suspended operations for the 2022 season. Violette earned an upset 3–0 victory over Austin FC, a Major League Soccer club from the United States, in the Round of 16's first leg in the Dominican Republic. Due to issues obtaining enough travel visas for the second leg in the United States, Violette temporarily signed several players from the lower leagues of U.S. soccer to serve as bench players. The team arrived in the United States with 14 total players—avoiding a forfeit—and lost 2–0 to retain their 3–2 aggregate lead and advance to the quarterfinals.

In the 2025–26 season, Violette won both the Série d'Ouverture and the Série de Clôture of the national league.

== Honours ==
=== Domestic ===
- Ligue Haïtienne (9): 1939, 1957, 1968, 1983, 1994–95, 1999, 2020–21 O, 2025–26 O, 2025–26 C
- Coupe d'Haïti (2): 1939, 1951

=== International ===
==== Continental ====
- CONCACAF Champions Cup (1): 1984

==== Regional ====
- CFU Caribbean Club Championship (1): 2022

== International competitions ==
The following is a list of results for Violette AC in international competitions. Violette AC's scores are listed first.

Year	Tournament	Round	Opponent	Home	Away	Agg.
1969	CONCACAF Champions' Cup	First Round	(Bermuda) Somerset Trojans		1–1	1–6
1969	CONCACAF Champions' Cup	First Round	(Bermuda) Somerset Trojans		0–5	1–6
1975	CONCACAF Champions' Cup	Round 1	(Suriname) Transvaal	4–0	2–2	6–2 (Note: Violette was disqualified for using ineligible players.)
1977	CONCACAF Champions' Cup	First Round	(Trinidad and Tobago) Defence Force	2–0	2–0	4–0
1977	CONCACAF Champions' Cup	Second Round	(Suriname) Robinhood	0–0	0–1	0–1
1984	CONCACAF Champions' Cup	Second Round	(Curaçao) Victory Boys	3–0	3–0	6–0
1984	CONCACAF Champions' Cup	Third Round	(French Guiana) Sport Guyanais	2–2	0–0	2–2
1994	CONCACAF Champions' Cup	First Round	(Curaçao) Jong Colombia	1–0	0–2	1–2
2000	CFU Club Championship	First Round	(Jamaica) Harbour View		0–5	
2000	CFU Club Championship	First Round	(Saint Lucia) Roots Alley Ballers		7–1	
2000	CFU Club Championship	First Round	(Barbados) Paradise		2–1	
2002	CFU Club Championship	Second Round	(Saint Lucia) VSADC		3–1	
2002	CFU Club Championship	Second Round	(Jamaica) Arnett Gardens		0–0	
2022	Caribbean Club Championship	Group Stage	(Dominican Republic) Cibao		0–3	
2022	Caribbean Club Championship	Group Stage	(Jamaica) Cavalier		3–2	
2022	Caribbean Club Championship	Semi-finals	(Jamaica) Waterhouse		3–1	
2022	Caribbean Club Championship	Final	(Dominican Republic) Cibao		0–0	
2023	CONCACAF Champions League	Round of 16	(United States) Austin FC	3–0	0–2	3–2
2023	CONCACAF Champions League	Quarter-finals	(Mexico) León	2–1	0–5	2–6
2026	CONCACAF Caribbean Cup	Group Stage	(Trinidad and Tobago) Defence Force	3–0		
2026	CONCACAF Caribbean Cup	Group Stage	(Dominican Republic) Delfines del Este		1–0	
2026	CONCACAF Caribbean Cup	Group Stage	(Suriname) Broki		2–1	
2026	CONCACAF Caribbean Cup	Group Stage	(Trinidad and Tobago) Club Sando	1–0		
2026	CONCACAF Caribbean Cup	Semi-finals	(Jamaica) Portmore United		1–3	3–4
2026	CONCACAF Caribbean Cup	Semi-finals	(Jamaica) Portmore United		2–1	3–4
2026	CONCACAF Caribbean Cup	Third Place Play-off	(Trinidad and Tobago) Club Sando			

== Crests ==
The original Violette AC crest (1918–??)

The former Violette AC crest (???–2014). A slight modification of the original crest from light blue to blue and the words Honneur and Fair-Play added.

The current Violette AC crest (2014–present)

== Current squad ==
As of March 2026

Note: Flags indicate national team as defined under FIFA eligibility rules; some limited exceptions apply. Players may hold more than one non-FIFA nationality.

No.	Pos.	Nation	Player
1	GK	HAI	Guivemy Joseph
2	DF	HAI	Renato Lambert
3	DF	HAI	Fernando Cicéron
4	DF	HAI	Lutherson Merville
5	DF	HAI	Jean Leriche
6	DF	HAI	Wilmond Oracius
7	MF	HAI	Jean-Fabrice Védrine
8	MF	HAI	Kerlins Georges
9	FW	HAI	Clavens Exantus
10	FW	HAI	Miche-Naider Chéry
11	FW	HAI	Stevenson Guillaume
12	GK	HAI	Gooly Elien

No.	Pos.	Nation	Player
13	DF	HAI	Jude Saint-Louis
15	MF	HAI	Lens Pierre
16	MF	HAI	Dany Camille
17	MF	HAI	Wendy Saint-Félix
19	FW	HAI	Fritzner Oslin
24	MF	HAI	Peterson Revanche
25	DF	HAI	Samuel Pompée
27	MF	HAI	Woodensky Pierre
30	MF	HAI	Elyvens Déjean
35	FW	HAI	Tay Plaisimond
77	MF	HAI	Steeven Saba

== List of coaches ==
- (Haiti) Antoine Tassy
- (Haiti) Philippe Vorbe
- (Haiti) Kênelt Thomas
- (Haiti) Georges Emmanuel
- (Haiti) Ralph Kernisan
