= Shaniel Thomas =

Jamaican footballer (born 2001)

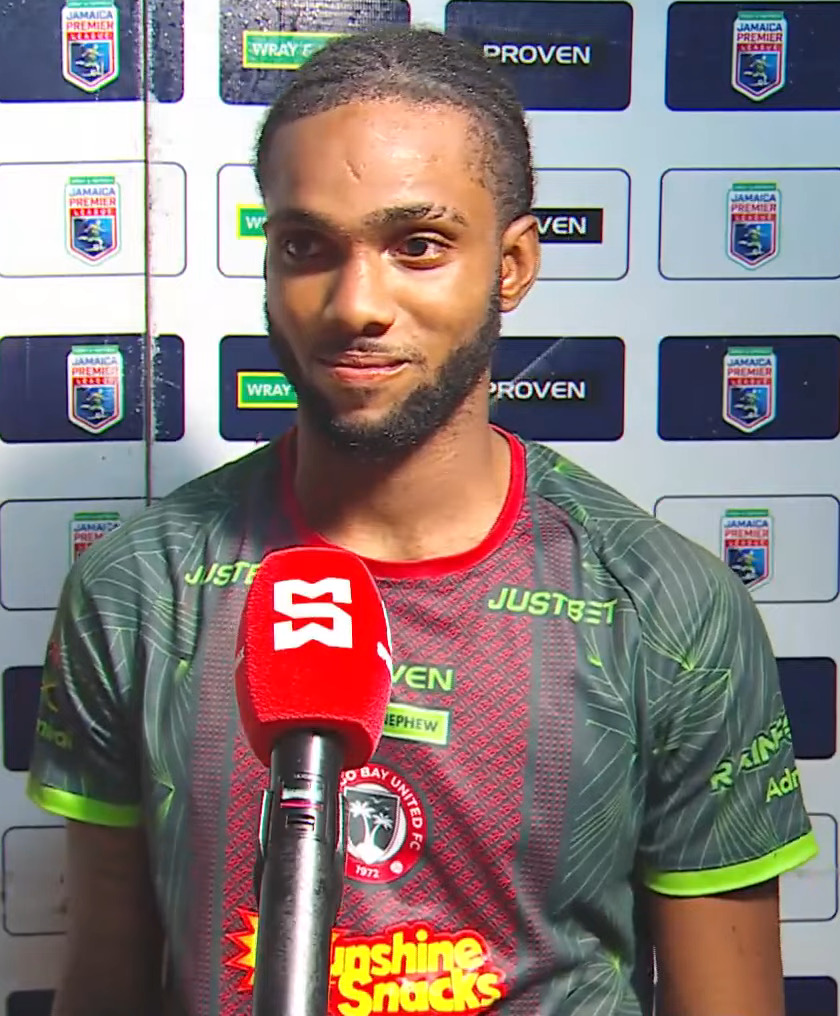
- Thomas at an interview in 2024

Personal information
- Full name: Shaniel Malik Michel Thomas
- Date of birth: September 14, 2001 (age 25)
- Place of birth: Jamaica
- Position: Forward

Team information
- Current team: Montego Bay United
- Number: 17

Youth career
- Jamaica College

Senior career*
| Years | Team | Apps | (Gls) |
| 2018–2024 | Cavalier | 64 | (15) |
| 2024– | Montego Bay United | 32 | (11) |

International career^{‡}
| 2023– | Jamaica | 5 | (0) |
- * Club domestic league appearances and goals as of 4 May 2025 ‡ National team caps and goals as of 9 February 2025

Shaniel Thomas (born 14 September 2001) is a Jamaican footballer who plays as a forward for Montego Bay United and the Jamaica national football team.

== Career ==
=== Schoolboy career ===
Thomas attended traditional all-boys high school Jamaica College where he began his footballing journey playing at the schoolboy level in the Manning Cup. Thomas helped the school to their fifth consecutive Manning Cup title in 2017, scoring a goal in the finals.

=== Club career ===
==== Cavalier ====
Thomas made his Jamaica Premier League debut with Cavalier in the 2018–19 season. He won the league with the club in 2021 and 2023–24 seasons.

Thomas bagged the first hat-trick of his career and the first in CONCACAF Caribbean Cup history in Cavalier's 3–0 win over Moca of the Dominican Republic, in the group stage of the 2023 CONCACAF Caribbean Cup. Thomas scored a hat-trick again in the following fixture versus Golden Lion of Martinique, setting another historic milestone as the first and only player to have ever scored back-to-back hat-tricks in the competition. Thomas ended the tournament as top goal scorer with 8 goals. Thomas was praised by head coach, Rudolph Speid, for his performance in the competition.

After five seasons with Cavalier, Thomas announced his departure from the club after winning the league in 2024. At the title celebrations he was quoted, "I expect this will be my last season with the team and I am happy I won the title in my last season. So it’s a good farewell.”

==== Montego Bay United ====
Thomas was unveiled as a Montego Bay United player prior to the start of the 2024–25 season. In an interview with local media Thomas was confident he made the right decision to move to Jamaica's second city, “My contract was going to be up, and I just felt like I wanted a new challenge. From under-15 and high school I have been creating waves and winning trophies. So I felt like I’ve done it all in Kingston and just wanted to conquer the next city."

=== International career ===
As a reward of for his impressive form at the 2023 CONCACAF Caribbean Cup, Thomas earned his first call-up to the Jamaica national team to face Guatemala in an international friendly at the Red Bull Arena in New Jersey. Thomas came on as a substitute replacing Tyreek Magee in the 83rd minute.

== Career statistics ==
=== International ===
As of match played 9 February 2025

| National team | Year | Apps | Goals |
|---|---|---|---|
| Jamaica | 2023 | 1 | 0 |
| Jamaica | 2024 | 2 | 0 |
| Jamaica | 2025 | 2 | 0 |
| Total | | 5 | 0 |

== Honors ==
=== Club ===
Cavalier

- Jamaica Premier League: 2021, 2023–24

=== Individual ===
- CONCACAF Caribbean Cup Golden Boot: 2023
- CONCACAF Caribbean Cup Best XI: 2023
- CONCACAF Caribbean Cup Semifinal Best XI: 2023
- CONCACAF Caribbean Cup Group Stage Best XI: 2023
