= Nickalia Fuller =

Jamaican footballer (born 2004)

Personal information
- Full name: Nickalia Fuller
- Date of birth: 16 December 2004 (age 21)
- Place of birth: Jamaica
- Position: Forward

Team information
- Current team: Mount Pleasant Football Academy

Senior career*
Years	Team	Apps	(Gls)
2023-2026	Tivoli Gardens	?	(?)
2026–	Mount Pleasant Football Academy	2	(1)

International career^{‡}
2025–	Jamaica	4	(1)
- * Club domestic league appearances and goals as of 22:34, 20 September 2026 (UTC) ‡ National team caps and goals as of 21:07, 30 May 2026 (UTC)

Nickalia Fuller (born 16 December 2004) is a Jamaican footballer who plays for Mount Pleasant Football Academy in the JPL and the Jamaica national team.

== Club career ==
Reid began his career with Tivoli Gardens, where he has played well catching the eye of the Jamaica national team coaches.

In July 2026, Fuller transferred to Mount Pleasant Football Academy in Jamaica's top league, JPL.

== International career ==
In August 2025 and January 2026, Fuller was called up to the Jamaica national team for a match versus Grenada.

== Career statistics ==
As of match played 30 May 2026

Appearances and goals by national team and year
National team	Year	Apps	Goals
Jamaica	2025	2	0
Jamaica	2026	2	1
Total		4	1

Scores and results list Gabon's goal tally first, score column indicates score after each Fuller goal.

List of international goals scored by Denis Bouanga
No.	Date	Venue	Opponent	Score	Result	Competition
1	18 January 2026	Kirani James Athletic Stadium, St. George, Grenada	Grenada	1–0	1–0	Friendly
