= Salcedo FC =

Football club in the Dominican Republic

- Full name: Salcedo Fútbol Club
- Nickname: La Tropa Celeste (The Celestial Troop)
- Founded: 1992
- Ground: Estadio Domingo Polonia, Salcedo, Dominican Republic
- Capacity: 2,000
- Manager: Arturo Berroa
- League: Liga Dominicana de Fútbol
- 2025-26: Champions (1st title)
- Website: Instagram

Salcedo Fútbol Club, commonly known as Salcedo FC, is a professional football club based in Salcedo, Dominican Republic. The club was founded in 1992 and made its debut in the Liga Dominicana de Fútbol, the top-tier professional football league in the Dominican Republic, during the 2025-26 season.

== History ==
Salcedo FC was established in 1992. For over a decade, the club operated outside the top professional tier, as the Liga Dominicana de Fútbol (LDF) itself was launched in March 2015. Prior to its LDF debut, Salcedo FC competed in the LDF 2da División Expansión, the country's second division. In the 2024 season, the club finished 5th in the Zona Norte standings, accumulating 18 points from 14 matches, with a record of 6 wins, 0 draws, and 8 losses, and a goal difference of +2.

A significant milestone for the club was its unanimous selection by the LDF board to compete in the 2025-2026 LDF season. This decision was based on the club's "general structures, seating capacity in home games, and history," indicating a recognition of Salcedo FC's operational readiness and suitability for top-tier competition.

== 2025-26 Season ==
The Liga Dominicana de Fútbol 2025–26 season for Salcedo began on 12 August 2025 with a 6–0 win against the now-relegated Atletico San Cristóbal at the Estadio Panamericano in San Cristóbal. Haitian Attacker Daniel Jamesley holds the record for the franchise's first-ever goal in a professional match (2'). Jamesley and Argentine newcomer Gaston Comas led the match with two goals each. The match continued with a goal from Brayan Bermudez (45'+1) and an own goal from San Cristóbal's centre-back Kervens Dessin (25').

=== 2026 Liguilla ===
Finishing the regular phase of the season with 18 matches played (9 wins, 5 ties, 4 losses), Salcedo ranked 3rd place out of 6 and was able to qualify for the Liguilla phase. Defined by determination and impressive offense led by club favorites like Daniel Jamesley, Jairo Luis Alegria Flores, and Daniel Flores Salcedo held on to 6 wins, 5 ties, 4 losses with a goal difference of 3. This resulted in the club moving on to the LDF Semi-finals after finishing 3rd in the standings.

=== 2026 Finals ===
The 2026 Liga Dominicana de Fútbol Gran Final marked a special historical event in the league's 11-year history, with Salcedo FC being the second team to qualify for the Finals in their first ever professional season (Atletico de San Francisco in 2018). The first-leg match took place on Sunday, 17 May 2026 at the Estadio Domingo Polonia in Salcedo, Hermanas Mirabal. The second-leg concluding the season on 24 May 2026 at Cibao FC Stadium in Santiago de Los Caballeros.

Team 1	Agg.	Team 2	1st leg	2nd leg
Cibao	2–3	Salcedo	0–2	2–1

17 May 2026
16:00 UTC−3

Salcedo	2–0	Cibao
J. Daniel 45+1'; Reyes 69'	Report

Estadio Domingo Polonia, Salcedo
Referee: Carlos Mateo
24 May 2026
18:00 UTC−3

Cibao	2–1	Salcedo
Roces 76'; Correa 88'	Report	Correa 90+1' (o.g.)

Estadio Cibao FC
Referee: Randy Encarnacion

== Stadium ==
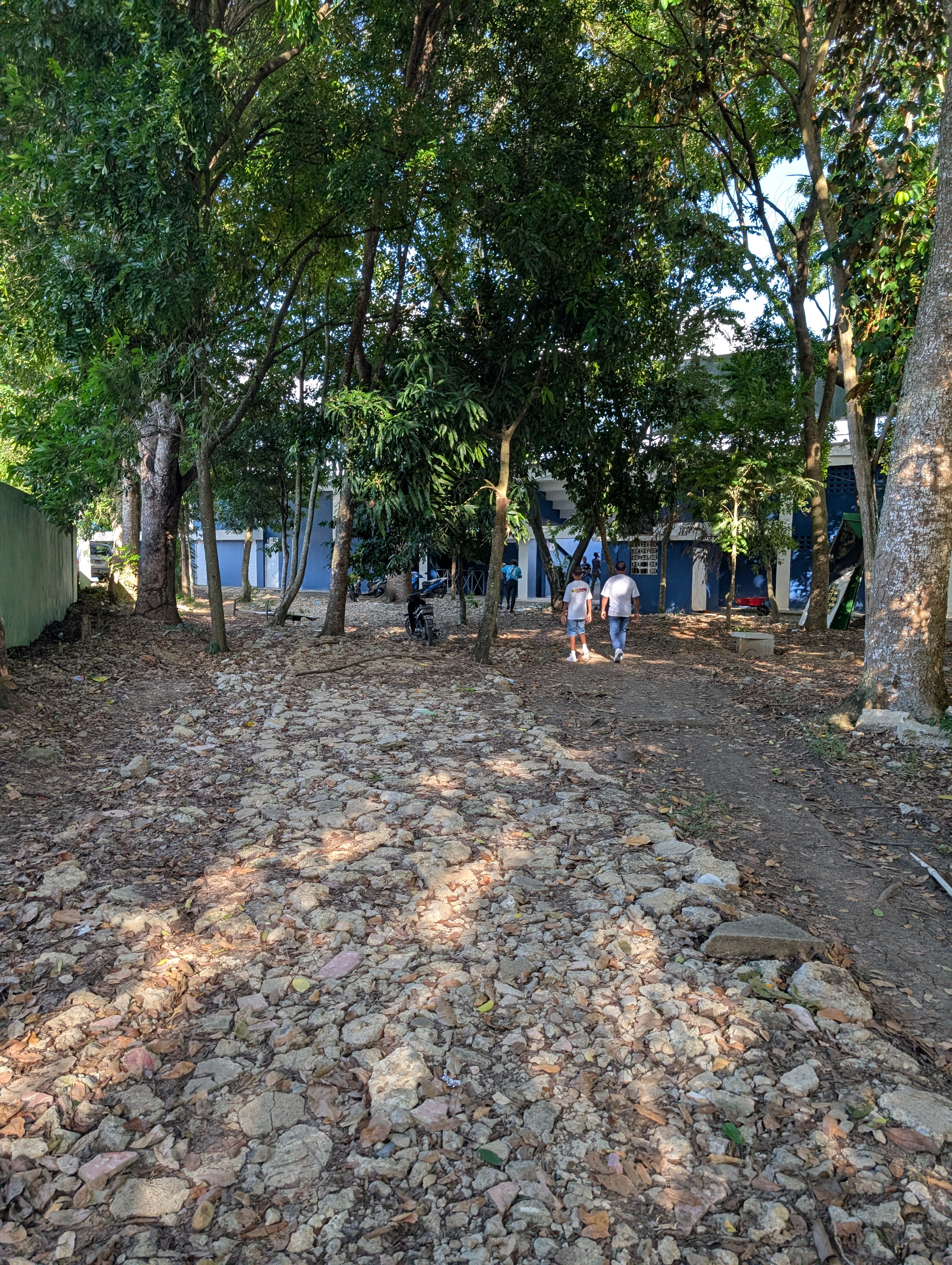
Outside of Domingo Polonia Stadium

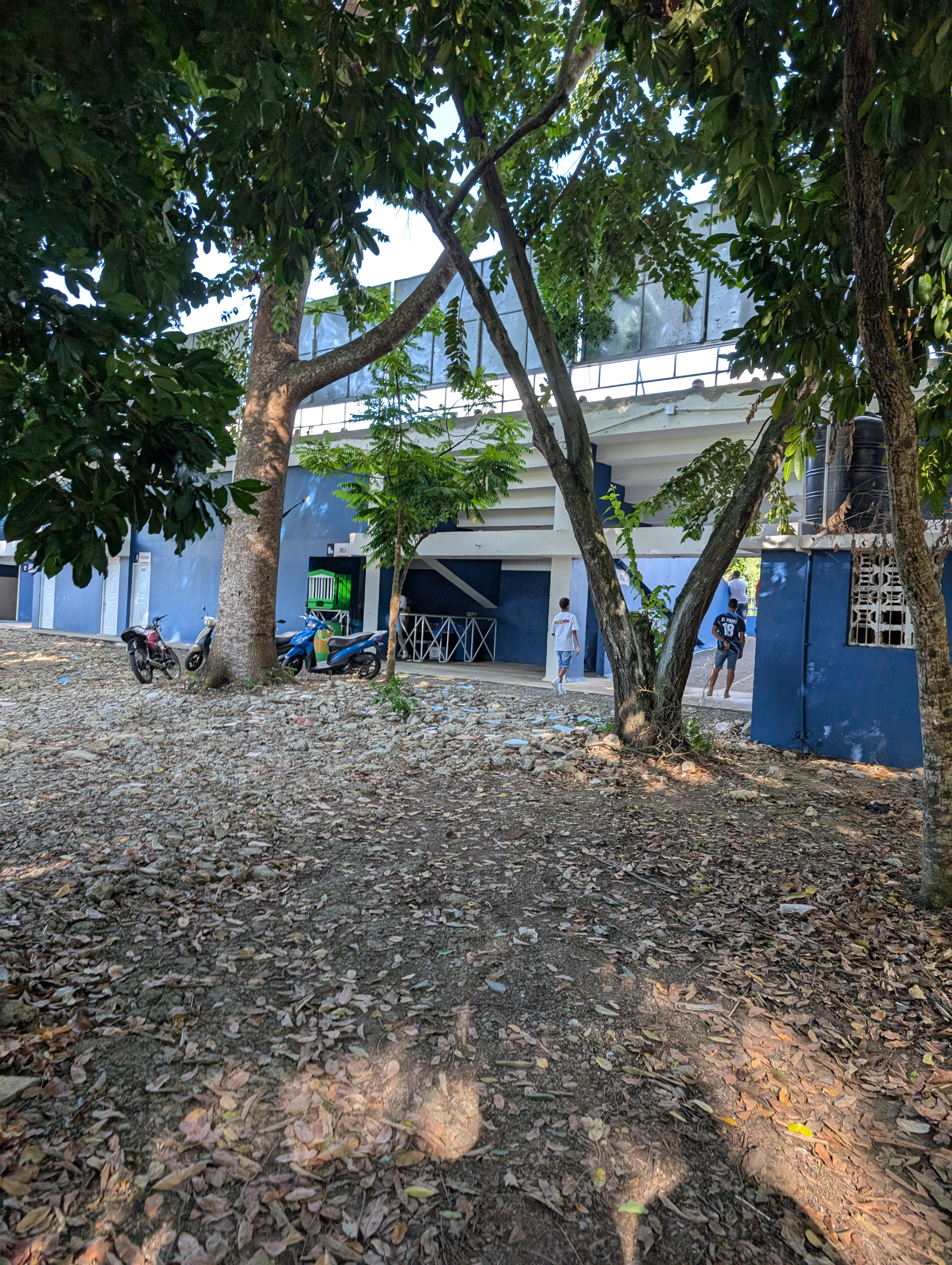
Closer view of Domingo Polonia Stadium's entrance

Salcedo FC plays its home matches at Estadio Domingo Polonia, located in Salcedo, Dominican Republic. The stadium has a seating capacity of 2,000 spectators. The stadium's capacity was a factor considered by the LDF board for the club's promotion, indicating it meets professional standards.

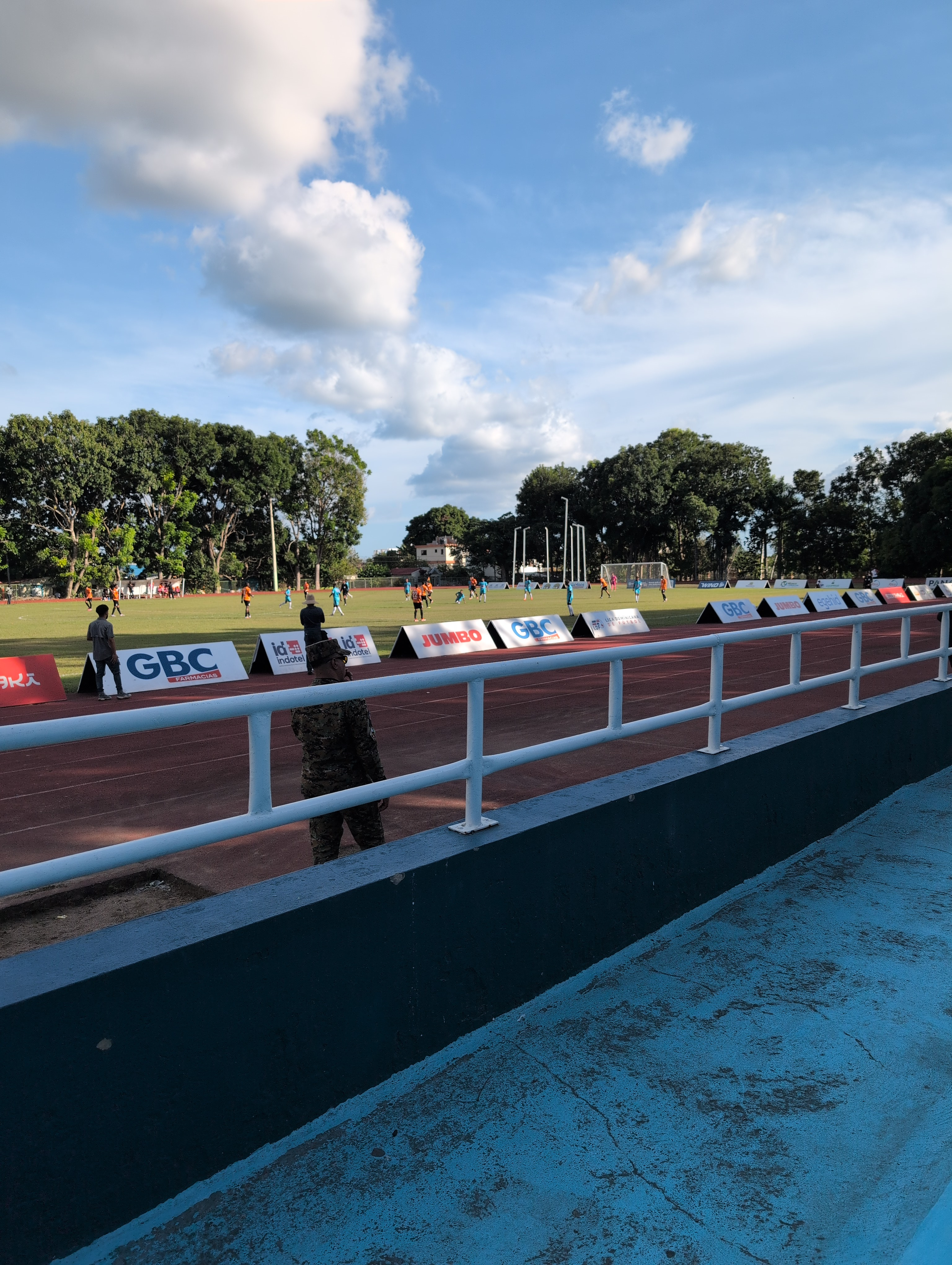
View of the soccer field in Domingo Polonia Stadium (from the stands)

== First Professional Appearance (2025 Copa de la LDF) ==
In the 2025 Copa de la LDF, Salcedo FC held the 7th position in the league table. After 11 matches played, the team accumulated 15 points. Their performance is marked by a positive goal difference of +6, having scored 17 goals and conceded 11.

Recent match results for Salcedo FC in the Copa de la LDF include:

Wins: 1-0 vs. Jarabacoa, 5-0 vs. Universidad O&M, and 0-1 vs. Atl. Vega Real (away).

Draws: 2-2 vs. San Cristóbal, 1-1 vs. Cibao FC, and 2-2 vs. Santa Fe FC.

Losses: 1-2 vs. Atlético Pantoja, 2-1 vs. CBA Santo Domingo, 1-0 vs. Delfines Del Este, and 1-0 vs. Atlántico.

Their most recent fixture was a 0–1 victory against Atlético Vega Real on April 26, 2025.

== Players and staff ==
=== Current roster ===
Salcedo FC's squad consists of 29 players, with an average age of 24.9 years. The team includes 7 foreign players, making up 24.1% of the total squad.

=== Key Players ===
The leading goalscorers for Salcedo FC in the 2025 Copa de la LDF are Brayan Bermúdez (attacking midfield), Braian Guevara (centre-forward), and Augustin Fernández (attack), each with three goals. Bryan More (right winger) and Daniel Flores (defensive midfield) have each contributed 2 goals.

Brayan Bermúdez (attacking midfield) and Bryan More (Right Winger) lead the team with two assists each. Braian Guevara (centre-forward), Augustin Fernández (attack), and Alejandro Carrera (left midfield) have each provided one assist.

=== Coaching staff ===
The club is managed by Arturo Berroa, who was appointed on January 1, 2025. He is supported by assistant manager Daniel Roberto Luengo, appointed on January 28, 2025.

== Rivalries ==
Since available information does not explicitly define specific rivalries for Salcedo FC in the traditional sense of long-standing football derbies, There is a sort of sprouted rivalry that came with the Copa de la Liga Dominicana de Fútbol in 2025 with other clubs based on their proximity in the Cibao Region. These other clubs are Cibao Fútbol Club, Moca Fútbol Club, and Atlético Vega Real.

== Current roster ==
Note: Flags indicate national team as defined under FIFA eligibility rules; some limited exceptions apply. Players may hold more than one non-FIFA nationality.

No.	Pos.	Nation	Player
1	GK	DOM	Cristian Severino
3	DF	DOM	Yulian Alba
5	DF	DOM	Joel Valentín
6	DF	DOM	Starlin Alba
7	FW	DOM	Bryan More
8	FW	DOM	Bryan Mejía
9	FW	COL	Jairo Alegría
10	FW	COL	Sebastián Ramos
11	FW	DOM	Anyelo Gómez
13	MF	DOM	Adhonys Vargas
16	MF	DOM	Alexander Jiménez
17	DF	DOM	Alexander Vidal Ceballos

No.	Pos.	Nation	Player
18	DF	DOM	Jeremy Báez
19	MF	DOM	Daniel Flores (captain)
20	DF	DOM	Misael Gomez
22	DF	DOM	Josander Tejada
23	MF	DOM	Jean Almanzar
26	DF	DOM	Carlos Rossell
30	MF	DOM	Esstiel Reyes
33	GK	DOM	Odalis Báez
39	GK	DOM	Favio Marte
80	MF	DOM	Engels Cruz
90	DF	COL	Frank Salas
99	FW	HAI	Daniel Jamesley
