= Daniel Jamesley =

Haitian footballer (born 1996)

Personal information
- Full name: Daniel Jamesley
- Date of birth: 19 October 1996 (age 30)
- Place of birth: Delmas, Haiti
- Position: Striker

Team information
- Current team: Universidad O&M
- Number: 7

Senior career*
| Years | Team | Apps | (Gls) |
| 2014 | Don Bosco | | |
| 2015–2017 | Racing Gonaïves | | |
| 2018 | Jarabacoa | 20+ | (14) |
| 2019–2020 | Universidad O&M | 30+ | (17) |
| 2020 | Capoise | | |
| 2021–2022 | Universidad O&M | 44 | (21) |
| 2022-24 | Real Santa Cruz | | |
| 2025- | Salcedo FC | 16 | (13) |

International career^{‡}
| 2021– | Haiti | 1 | (0) |
- * Club domestic league appearances and goals as of 7 December 2025 ‡ National team caps and goals as of 17 May 2021

Daniel Jamesley (born 19 October 1996) is a Haitian professional footballer who plays as a striker for Dominican club Universidad O&M and the Haiti national team.

== International career ==
On 25 March 2021, Jamesley made his debut for Haiti as a starter in a 2–0 World Cup qualifier win over Belize.
