= Cerezo Haabo =

Surinamese footballer (born 1994)

Personal information
- Full name: Cerezo Haabo
- Date of birth: 3 March 1994 (age 32)
- Place of birth: Washabo, Suriname
- Height: 1.81 m (5 ft 11 in)
- Position: Forward

Team information
- Current team: AS Étoile de Matoury

Senior career*
Years	Team	Apps	(Gls)
2014–2018	Robinhood		
2018–2019	Inter Moengotapoe		
2019–2022	Broki		
2022–	AS Étoile de Matoury		

International career
2018–2019	Suriname	2	(0)
- * Club domestic league appearances and goals

Cerezo Haabo (born 3 March 1994) is a Surinamese professional footballer who plays as a forward for French Guiana Régional 1 club AS Étoile de Matoury.

== International career ==
Haabo made his debut for Suriname in a 0–0 draw against Dominica on 6 September 2018.

== Honours ==
Robinhood

- SVB Eerste Divisie: 2017–18
- SVB Cup: 2015–16, 2017–18
- Suriname President's Cup: 2016

Inter Moengotapoe

- SVB Eerste Divisie: 2018–19
- SVB Cup: 2018–19

AS Étoile de Matoury

- French Guiana Régional 1: 2022–23, 2023–24
- Coupe de Guyane: 2023–24
