= Thierry Catherine =

Martiniquais footballer (born 1997)

Personal information
- Date of birth: 2 August 1997 (age 29)
- Place of birth: Fort-de-France, Martinique
- Height: 1.80 m (5 ft 11 in)
- Position: Midfielder

Team information
- Current team: Golden Lion

Senior career*
Years	Team	Apps	(Gls)
2015–2018	Golden Lion		
2018	Swope Park Rangers	0	(0)
2018–	Golden Lion		

International career^{‡}
2018–	Martinique	5	(0)
- * Club domestic league appearances and goals as of 12:57, 4 January 2019 (UTC) ‡ National team caps and goals as of 24 September 2022

Thierry Catherine (born 2 August 1997) is a Martiniquais professional footballer who plays for Golden Lion FC and the Martinique national football team.

== Career statistics ==
=== International ===
As of matches played 24 September 2022.

National team	Year	Apps	Goals
Martinique	2018	1	0
Martinique	2019	3	0
Martinique	2022	1	0
Total		5	0
