= 2016 CFU Club Championship =

2016 CFU Club Champions’ Cup

Tournament details
- Dates: 24 February – 1 May 2016
- Teams: 14 (from 8 associations)

Final positions
- Champions: (Trinidad and Tobago) Central (2nd title)
- Runners-up: (Trinidad and Tobago) W Connection
- Third place: (Haiti) Don Bosco
- Fourth place: (Jamaica) Arnett Gardens

Tournament statistics
- Matches played: 22
- Goals scored: 83 (3.77 per match)
- Top scorer(s): (Grenada) Jamal Charles (Jamaica) Michealos Martin (4 goals each)

The 2016 CFU Club Championship was the 18th edition of CFU Club Championship, the annual international club football competition in the Caribbean region, held amongst clubs whose football associations are affiliated with the Caribbean Football Union (CFU). The top three teams in the tournament qualified for the 2016–17 CONCACAF Champions League. Central were the defending champions, having won the 2015 CFU Club Championship, and successfully defended their title, defeating fellow Trinidadian side W Connection in the final for the second straight year.

== Teams ==
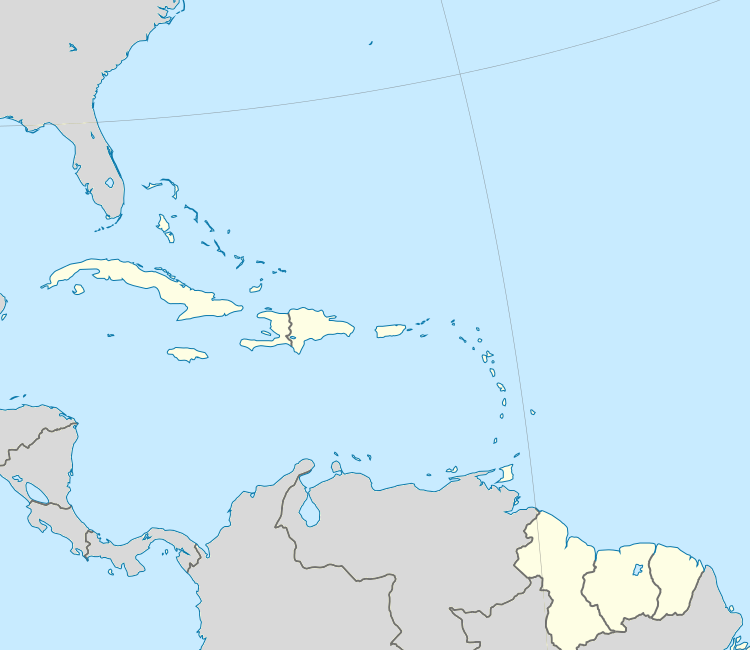
Location of teams of the 2016 CFU Club Championship
Red: Group 1; Green: Group 2; Blue: Group 3; Yellow: Group 4; Dots: indicate group hosts; Pogs: indicate other group teams

The tournament was open to all league champions and runners-up from each of the 31 CFU member associations, once their competition ended on or before the end of 2015.

A total of 14 teams from 8 CFU associations entered the competition. This is the first CFU Club Championship to feature teams from the Dominican Republic, with Atlético Pantoja and Atlántico both participating.

| Association | Team | Qualification method |
|---|---|---|
| Bermuda | Somerset Trojans | 2014–15 Bermudian Premier Division champions |
| (Cayman Islands) Cayman Islands | Scholars International | 2014–15 Cayman Islands Premier League champions |
| (Dominican Republic) Dominican Republic | Atlético Pantoja | 2015 Liga Dominicana de Fútbol champions |
| (Dominican Republic) Dominican Republic | Atlántico | 2015 Liga Dominicana de Fútbol runners-up |
| Guadeloupe | Moulien | 2014–15 Guadeloupe Division d'Honneur champions |
| Guadeloupe | La Gauloise | 2014–15 Guadeloupe Division d'Honneur runners-up |
| Haiti | Don Bosco | 2015 Ligue Haïtienne Tournoi d'Ouverture champions |
| Haiti | América | 2015 Ligue Haïtienne Tournoi d'Ouverture runners-up |
| Jamaica | Arnett Gardens | 2014–15 National Premier League champions |
| Jamaica | Montego Bay United | 2014–15 National Premier League runners-up |
| Suriname | Inter Moengotapoe | 2014–15 SVB Hoofdklasse champions |
| Suriname | Notch | 2014–15 SVB Hoofdklasse runners-up |
| (Trinidad and Tobago) Trinidad and Tobago | Central | 2014–15 TT Pro League champions |
| (Trinidad and Tobago) Trinidad and Tobago | W Connection | 2014–15 TT Pro League runners-up |

Associations which did not enter a team
- Anguilla
- (Antigua and Barbuda) Antigua and Barbuda
- Aruba
- (The Bahamas) Bahamas
- Barbados
- Bonaire
- (British Virgin Islands) British Virgin Islands
- Cuba
- Curaçao
- Dominica
- (French Guiana) French Guiana
- Grenada
- Guyana
- Martinique
- Montserrat
- (Puerto Rico) Puerto Rico
- (Saint Kitts and Nevis) Saint Kitts and Nevis
- (Saint Lucia) Saint Lucia
- (Collectivity of Saint Martin) Saint-Martin
- (Saint Vincent and the Grenadines) Saint Vincent and the Grenadines
- (Sint Maarten) Sint Maarten
- (Turks and Caicos Islands) Turks and Caicos Islands
- (United States Virgin Islands) U.S. Virgin Islands

Notes

1. Haiti (HAI): Haiti's 2015 Tournoi de Clôture was not completed until 3 January 2016, and thus only one champion was crowned in the 2015 calendar year. The runners-up of the Tournoi d'Ouverture (América) were invited instead of the champions of the Tournoi de Clôture (FICA).

== Schedule ==
| Round | Dates | |
|---|---|---|
| Preliminary round | Groups A & B | 24–28 February 2016 |
| Preliminary round | Group C | 9–13 March 2016 |
| Preliminary round | Group D | 2–6 March 2016 |
| Final round | 29 April – 1 May 2016 | |

The Group C matches were delayed from the original dates of 24–28 February 2016 due to the Jamaican general election on 25 February.

== Preliminary round ==
In the preliminary round, the 14 teams were divided into two groups of four teams and two groups of three teams, consisting of two league champions and either one or two league runners-up. Each group was played on a round-robin basis, hosted by one of the teams at a centralized venue. The winners of each group advanced to the final round.

=== Group 1 ===
Host venue: Ato Boldon Stadium, Couva, Trinidad and Tobago (all times UTC−4)

| Pos | Team | Pld | W | D | L | GF | GA | GD | Pts | Qualification |
|---|---|---|---|---|---|---|---|---|---|---|
| 1 | (Trinidad and Tobago) W Connection (H) | 3 | 3 | 0 | 0 | 12 | 4 | +8 | 9 | Final round |
| 2 | (Suriname) Inter Moengotapoe | 3 | 2 | 0 | 1 | 5 | 5 | 0 | 6 | |
| 3 | (Dominican Republic) Atlántico | 3 | 1 | 0 | 2 | 6 | 5 | +1 | 3 | |
| 4 | (Guadeloupe) Moulien | 3 | 0 | 0 | 3 | 3 | 12 | −9 | 0 | |

Source: CFU
(H) Hosts
24 February 2016
17:30

| Inter Moengotapoe (Suriname) | 3–2 | (Guadeloupe) Moulien |
|---|---|---|
| Vamur 26' (o.g.); Kastiel 31', 90+2' | Report (CFU); Report (CONCACAF) | Bizasène 47'; Francillonne 64' |

Ato Boldon Stadium, Couva
Referee: Sherwin Johnson (Guyana)
24 February 2016
20:00

| W Connection (Trinidad and Tobago) | 4–2 | (Dominican Republic) Atlántico |
|---|---|---|
| Williams 32', 68'; Charles 77', 90' | Report (CFU); Report (CONCACAF) | Benítez 7'; Rodríguez 66' |

Ato Boldon Stadium, Couva
Referee: Leo Clarke (Saint Lucia)

26 February 2016
17:30

| Atlántico (Dominican Republic) | 0–1 | (Suriname) Inter Moengotapoe |
|---|---|---|
| | Report (CAF); Report (CONCACAF) | Pokie 31' |

Ato Boldon Stadium, Couva
Referee: Gianni Ascani (Turks and Caicos Islands)
26 February 2016
20:00

| W Connection (Trinidad and Tobago) | 5–1 | (Guadeloupe) Moulien |
|---|---|---|
| Charles 7'; Williams 53'; Apai 67'; Jones 70'; St. Prix 90+2' | Report (CFU); Report (CONCACAF) | Petit 4' |

Ato Boldon Stadium, Couva
Referee: Swason Owen (Cayman Islands)

28 February 2016
17:30

| Moulien (Guadeloupe) | 0–4 | (Dominican Republic) Atlántico |
|---|---|---|
| | Report (CFU); Report (CONCACAF) | Pérez 16'; Siar 50' (o.g.); Cásseres 56'; Isea 60' |

Ato Boldon Stadium, Couva
Referee: Swason Owen (Cayman Islands)
28 February 2016
20:00

| W Connection (Trinidad and Tobago) | 3–1 | (Suriname) Inter Moengotapoe |
|---|---|---|
| Charles 9'; St. Prix 81'; Hector 90' | Report (CFU); Report (CONCACAF) | Kwasie 90+2' |

Ato Boldon Stadium, Couva
Referee: Sherwin Johnson (Guyana)

=== Group 2 ===
Host venue: Stade Sylvio Cator, Port-au-Prince, Haiti (all times UTC−5)

| Pos | Team | Pld | W | D | L | GF | GA | GD | Pts | Qualification |
|---|---|---|---|---|---|---|---|---|---|---|
| 1 | (Haiti) Don Bosco (H) | 2 | 2 | 0 | 0 | 8 | 1 | +7 | 6 | Final round |
| 2 | (Guadeloupe) La Gauloise | 2 | 1 | 0 | 1 | 5 | 4 | +1 | 3 | |
| 3 | (Bermuda) Somerset Trojans | 2 | 0 | 0 | 2 | 1 | 9 | −8 | 0 | |

Source: CFU
(H) Hosts
24 February 2016
17:00

| Don Bosco (Haiti) | 5–0 | (Bermuda) Somerset Trojans |
|---|---|---|
| Dede 44'; Gooden 61' (o.g.); Campomar 76'; Estama 82'; Joseph 89' | Report (CFU); Report (CONCACAF) |

Stade Sylvio Cator, Port-au-Prince
Referee: Dwight Royal (Jamaica)

26 February 2016
17:00

| La Gauloise (Guadeloupe) | 4–1 | (Bermuda) Somerset Trojans |
|---|---|---|
| Boussemat 19'; Mocka 36' (pen.); Roche 62'; Dacalor 76' | Report (CFU); Report (CONCACAF) | Ming 32' |

Stade Sylvio Cator, Port-au-Prince
Referee: Kerry Skepple (Antigua and Barbuda)

28 February 2016
17:00

| Don Bosco (Haiti) | 3–1 | (Guadeloupe) La Gauloise |
|---|---|---|
| Estama 43'; Delva 55'; Georges 87' | Report (CFU); Report (CONCACAF) | Mocka 79' |

Stade Sylvio Cator, Port-au-Prince
Referee: Dwight Royal (Jamaica)

=== Group 3 ===
Host venue: Montego Bay Sports Complex, Montego Bay, Jamaica (all times UTC−5)

| Pos | Team | Pld | W | D | L | GF | GA | GD | Pts | Qualification |
|---|---|---|---|---|---|---|---|---|---|---|
| 1 | (Trinidad and Tobago) Central | 2 | 2 | 0 | 0 | 7 | 0 | +7 | 6 | Final round |
| 2 | (Jamaica) Montego Bay United (H) | 2 | 1 | 0 | 1 | 4 | 1 | +3 | 3 | |
| 3 | (Cayman Islands) Scholars International | 2 | 0 | 0 | 2 | 0 | 10 | −10 | 0 | |

Source: CFU
(H) Hosts
9 March 2016
20:00

| Montego Bay United (Jamaica) | 4–0 | (Cayman Islands) Scholars International |
|---|---|---|
| Gordon 25' (pen.), 73', 80'; Duval 42' (o.g.) | Report (CFU); Report (CONCACAF) |

Montego Bay Sports Complex, Montego Bay
Referee: Marcos Brea (Cuba)

11 March 2016
20:00

| Central (Trinidad and Tobago) | 6–0 | (Cayman Islands) Scholars International |
|---|---|---|
| Jack 2'; Darko 18'; Marcano 64', 90+2'; Mitchell 68'; Gordon 88' | Report (CFU); Report (CONCACAF) |

Montego Bay Sports Complex, Montego Bay

13 March 2016
20:00

| Montego Bay United (Jamaica) | 0–1 | (Trinidad and Tobago) Central |
|---|---|---|
| | Report (CFU); Report (CONCACAF) | Mitchell 87' |

Montego Bay Sports Complex, Montego Bay
Referee: Marcos Brea (Cuba)

=== Group 4 ===
Host venue: Estadio Quisqueya, Santo Domingo, Dominican Republic (all times UTC−4)

| Pos | Team | Pld | W | D | L | GF | GA | GD | Pts | Qualification |
|---|---|---|---|---|---|---|---|---|---|---|
| 1 | (Jamaica) Arnett Gardens | 3 | 3 | 0 | 0 | 12 | 4 | +8 | 9 | Final round |
| 2 | (Dominican Republic) Atlético Pantoja (H) | 3 | 2 | 0 | 1 | 4 | 1 | +3 | 6 | |
| 3 | (Haiti) América | 3 | 1 | 0 | 2 | 1 | 4 | −3 | 3 | |
| 4 | (Suriname) Notch | 3 | 0 | 0 | 3 | 4 | 12 | −8 | 0 | |

Source: CFU
(H) Hosts
2 March 2016
17:00

| Arnett Gardens (Jamaica) | 3–0 | (Haiti) América |
|---|---|---|
| Martin 48'; Harris 70'; Malcolm 86' | Report (CFU) |

Estadio Quisqueya, Santo Domingo
Referee: Wilson Da Costa (Bahamas)
2 March 2016
20:30

| Atlético Pantoja (Dominican Republic) | 3–0 | (Suriname) Notch |
|---|---|---|
| Rebollo 12'; Espinnal 64', 83' | Report (CFU) |

Estadio Quisqueya, Santo Domingo
Referee: William Anderson (Puerto Rico)

4 March 2016
17:00

| Notch (Suriname) | 4–8 | (Jamaica) Arnett Gardens |
|---|---|---|
| Welkens 33'; Anautan 35', 90'; Kwelling 42' | Report (CFU) | Malcolm 15', 18'; Martin 19', 35', 45'; Harris 44'; Sterling 80'; Hyde 84' |

Estadio Quisqueya, Santo Domingo
Referee: Rodphin Harris (Trinidad and Tobago)
4 March 2016
20:30

| Atlético Pantoja (Dominican Republic) | 1–0 | (Haiti) América |
|---|---|---|
| Batista 87' | Report (CFU) |

Estadio Quisqueya, Santo Domingo
Referee: Moeth Gaymes (Saint Vincent and the Grenadines)

6 March 2016
17:00

| América (Haiti) | 1–0 | (Suriname) Notch |
|---|---|---|
| Rameau 42' | Report (CFU) |

Estadio Quisqueya, Santo Domingo
Referee: Wilson Da Costa (Bahamas)
6 March 2016
20:30

| Atlético Pantoja (Dominican Republic) | 0–1 | (Jamaica) Arnett Gardens |
|---|---|---|
| | Report (CFU) | Strickland 80' |

Estadio Quisqueya, Santo Domingo
Referee: William Anderson (Puerto Rico)

== Final round ==
In the final round, the four teams played matches on a knock-out basis, hosted by one of the teams at a centralized venue. The semi-finals matchups were:

- Winner Group 1 vs. Winner Group 4
- Winner Group 2 vs. Winner Group 3

The semi-final winners played in the final, while the losers played in the third place match.

The CFU announced on 18 March 2016 that Don Bosco were chosen as the final round host, with the host venue being the Stade Sylvio Cator in Port-au-Prince, Haiti (all times UTC−5).

=== Bracket ===
Semi-finals
29 April
(Trinidad and Tobago) W Connection | 2
(Jamaica) Arnett Gardens | 0
29 April
(Haiti) Don Bosco | 1 (2)
(Trinidad and Tobago) Central (p) | 1 (4)

Final
1 May
(Trinidad and Tobago) W Connection | 0
(Trinidad and Tobago) Central | 3
Third place match
1 May
(Jamaica) Arnett Gardens | 0
(Haiti) Don Bosco | 2

=== Semi-finals ===
Winners qualified for the 2016–17 CONCACAF Champions League.

29 April 2016
16:30

| W Connection (Trinidad and Tobago) | 2–0 | (Jamaica) Arnett Gardens |
|---|---|---|
| Jones 2'; Winchester 45+2' | Report (CFU); Report (CONCACAF) |

Stade Sylvio Cator, Port-au-Prince
Referee: Wilson Da Costa (Bahamas)

29 April 2016
19:00

| Don Bosco (Haiti) | 1–1 (a.e.t.) | (Trinidad and Tobago) Central |
|---|---|---|
| Georges 104' (pen.) | Report (CFU); Report (CONCACAF) | De Silva 93' |
Penalties
| Georges (penalty scored); Origène (penalty missed); Adé (penalty scored); Fédé (penalty missed) | 2–4 | (penalty scored) Marcano; (penalty scored) John; (penalty scored) Ettienne; (penalty scored) Paul |

Stade Sylvio Cator, Port-au-Prince
Referee: Kimbell Ward (Saint Kitts and Nevis)

=== Third place match ===
Winner qualified for the 2016–17 CONCACAF Champions League.

1 May 2016
16:30

| Arnett Gardens (Jamaica) | 0–2 | (Haiti) Don Bosco |
|---|---|---|
| | Report (CFU); Report (CONCACAF) | Saint-Fort 27'; Philemond 53' |

Stade Sylvio Cator, Port-au-Prince
Referee: Sherwin Moore (Guyana)

=== Final ===
1 May 2016
19:00

| W Connection (Trinidad and Tobago) | 0–3 | (Trinidad and Tobago) Central |
|---|---|---|
| | Report (CFU); Report (CONCACAF) | Joseph 5'; Marcano 83'; Mitchell 90+3' |

Stade Sylvio Cator, Port-au-Prince
Referee: Javier Santos (Puerto Rico)

== Top scorers ==
| Rank | Player | Team | Goals |
|---|---|---|---|
| 1 | (Grenada) Jamal Charles | (Trinidad and Tobago) W Connection | 4 |
| 1 | (Jamaica) Michealos Martin | (Jamaica) Arnett Gardens | 4 |
| 3 | (Jamaica) Owayne Gordon | (Jamaica) Montego Bay United | 3 |
| 3 | (Jamaica) Kemal Malcolm | (Jamaica) Arnett Gardens | 3 |
| 3 | (Trinidad and Tobago) Jason Marcano | (Trinidad and Tobago) Central | 3 |
| 3 | (Trinidad and Tobago) Darren Mitchell | (Trinidad and Tobago) Central | 3 |
| 3 | (Trinidad and Tobago) Jomal Williams | (Trinidad and Tobago) W Connection | 3 |

Source: CFU

== Awards ==
| Award | Player | Team |
|---|---|---|
| Most Valuable Player | (Trinidad and Tobago) Leston Paul | (Trinidad and Tobago) Central |
| Golden Boot | (Trinidad and Tobago) Marcus Joseph | (Trinidad and Tobago) Central |
| Golden Boot | (Trinidad and Tobago) Jason Marcano | (Trinidad and Tobago) Central |
| Golden Boot | (Trinidad and Tobago) Darren Mitchell | (Trinidad and Tobago) Central |
| Golden Glove | (Trinidad and Tobago) Javon Sample | (Trinidad and Tobago) Central |
| Fair Play Award | — | (Trinidad and Tobago) Central |
