= 2018 Caribbean Club Championship =

2018 CONCACAF Caribbean Club Championship
2018 Flow CONCACAF Caribbean Club Championship

Tournament details
- Host countries: Group stage: Trinidad and Tobago (Group A); Dominican Republic (Group B); Final stage: Jamaica
- Dates: Group stage: 31 January – 11 February 2018; Final stage: 11–16 May 2018
- Teams: 8 (from 4 associations)

Final positions
- Champions: (Dominican Republic) Atlético Pantoja (1st title)
- Runners-up: (Jamaica) Arnett Gardens
- Third place: (Jamaica) Portmore United
- Fourth place: (Trinidad and Tobago) Central

Tournament statistics
- Matches played: 17
- Goals scored: 43 (2.53 per match)
- Top scorer: (Dominican Republic) Luis José Espinal (5 goals)
- Best player: (Dominican Republic) Miguel Odalis Báez
- Best goalkeeper: (Dominican Republic) Miguel Odalis Báez
- Fair play award: (Trinidad and Tobago) Central

The 2018 Caribbean Club Championship was the 20th edition of the Caribbean Club Championship (also known as the CFU Club Championship), the first-tier annual international club football competition in the Caribbean region, held amongst clubs whose football associations are affiliated with the Caribbean Football Union (CFU), a sub-confederation of CONCACAF.

The winners of the 2018 CONCACAF Caribbean Club Championship would qualify to the 2019 CONCACAF Champions League, the second and third place teams would qualify to the 2018 CONCACAF League, while the fourth place team would play against the winners of the 2018 CONCACAF Caribbean Club Shield, as long as the Shield winners fulfill the CONCACAF Regional Club Licensing criteria, in a playoff match to determine the final Caribbean spot to the 2018 CONCACAF League.

Cibao were the title holders, but were not eligible to enter since they failed to reach the final of the 2017 Liga Dominicana de Fútbol. For the second season in a row, the CONCACAF Caribbean Club Championship was won by a team from the Dominican Republic, with Atlético Pantoja crowned champions and qualifying for the CONCACAF Champions League. Runners-up Arnett Gardens and third place Portmore United qualified for the CONCACAF League, but fourth-placed Central lost to Shield winners Club Franciscain in a playoff and failed to qualify for the CONCACAF League.

== Teams ==
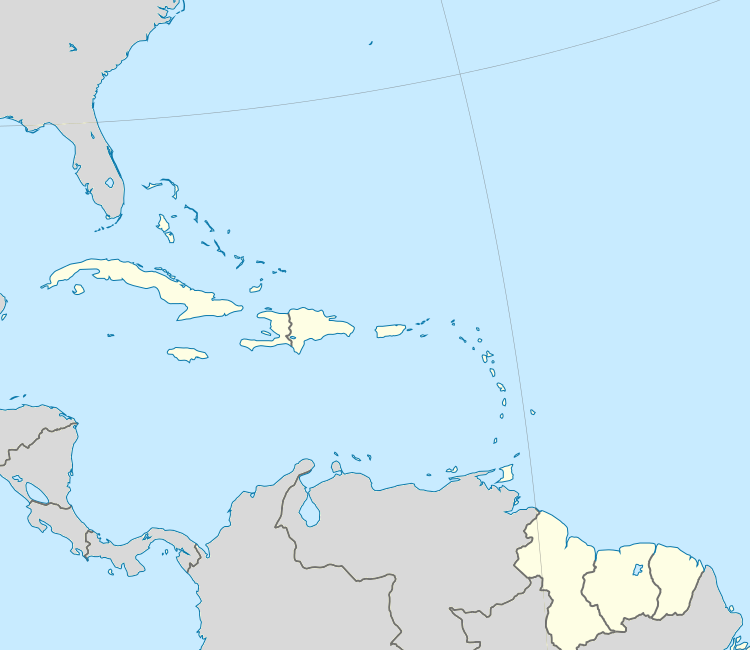
Location of teams of the 2018 CONCACAF Caribbean Club Championship

The CONCACAF Council, at its meeting on 25 July 2017 in San Francisco, California approved the implementation of the following two-tier competitions for affiliated clubs of Caribbean Member Associations starting in 2018:

- The Tier 1 competition, known as the CONCACAF Caribbean Club Championship, is contested by the champions and runners-up of the top professional and semi-professional leagues in year 1 (2018), and open to only fully professional leagues in year 2 (2019) and onwards.
- The Tier 2 competition, known as the CONCACAF Caribbean Club Shield, is contested by the champions of the top leagues in Member Associations that have no professional or semi-professional leagues in year 1 (2018), and open to amateur and semi-professional leagues in year 2 (2019) and onwards.

The new two-tier format of the CONCACAF Caribbean Club Championship and CONCACAF Caribbean Club Shield, as well as the teams participating in each tournament, were announced by CONCACAF on 15 December 2017. Among the 31 CFU member associations, four of them were classified as professional leagues and each may enter two teams in the CONCACAF Caribbean Club Championship.

A total of eight teams from four associations entered the 2018 CONCACAF Caribbean Club Championship (officially the 2018 Flow CONCACAF Caribbean Club Championship for sponsorship reasons).

| Association | Team | Qualification method |
|---|---|---|
| Dominican Republic | Atlántico | 2017 Liga Dominicana de Fútbol champions |
| Dominican Republic | Atlético Pantoja | 2017 Liga Dominicana de Fútbol runners-up |
| Haiti | Real Hope | 2017 Ligue Haïtienne Série d'Ouverture champions |
| Haiti | Racing | 2017 Ligue Haïtienne Série d'Ouverture runners-up |
| Jamaica | Arnett Gardens | 2016–17 National Premier League champions |
| Jamaica | Portmore United | 2016–17 National Premier League runners-up |
| Trinidad and Tobago | Central | 2016–17 TT Pro League champions |
| Trinidad and Tobago | W Connection | 2016–17 TT Pro League runners-up |

== Group stage ==
The draw for the group stage was held on 21 December 2017, 11:00 EST (UTC−5), at the CONCACAF Headquarters in Miami, United States, and was streamed on YouTube. The eight teams were drawn into two groups of four. The two group stage hosts were placed in Pot 1, while the remaining six teams were placed in Pot 2. Teams from the same association could not be drawn into the same group.

| Pot 1 (hosts) | Pot 2 |
|---|---|
| (Trinidad and Tobago) W Connection (Position A1); (Dominican Republic) Atlántico (Position B1) | (Dominican Republic) Atlético Pantoja; (Haiti) Real Hope; (Haiti) Racing; (Jamaica) Arnett Gardens; (Jamaica) Portmore United; (Trinidad and Tobago) Central |

The matches were played between 31 January – 4 February 2018 (Group A) and 7–11 February 2018 (Group B). The top two teams of each group advanced to the final stage.

=== Group A ===
Host venue: Ato Boldon Stadium, Couva, Trinidad and Tobago. All times local, AST (UTC−4).

| Pos | Team | Pld | W | D | L | GF | GA | GD | Pts | Qualification |
|---|---|---|---|---|---|---|---|---|---|---|
| 1 | (Dominican Republic) Atlético Pantoja | 3 | 2 | 1 | 0 | 6 | 0 | +6 | 7 | Final stage |
| 2 | (Jamaica) Arnett Gardens | 3 | 1 | 1 | 1 | 5 | 2 | +3 | 4 | Final stage |
| 3 | (Trinidad and Tobago) W Connection (H) | 3 | 1 | 0 | 2 | 2 | 5 | −3 | 3 | |
| 4 | (Haiti) Real Hope | 3 | 1 | 0 | 2 | 1 | 7 | −6 | 3 | |

Source: CONCACAF
(H) Hosts
31 January 2018
17:00

| Atlético Pantoja (Dominican Republic) | 0–0 | (Jamaica) Arnett Gardens |
|---|---|---|
| | Report |

Ato Boldon Stadium, Couva
Referee: Ricangel de Leça (Aruba)
31 January 2018
20:00

| W Connection (Trinidad and Tobago) | 0–1 | (Haiti) Real Hope |
|---|---|---|
| | Report | Jeudy 3' |

Ato Boldon Stadium, Couva
Referee: Oscar Macías (Mexico)

2 February 2018
17:00

| Real Hope (Haiti) | 0–3 | (Dominican Republic) Atlético Pantoja |
|---|---|---|
| | Report | Espinal 35', 59'; Maita 41' |

Ato Boldon Stadium, Couva
Referee: Reon Radix (Grenada)
2 February 2018
20:00

| W Connection (Trinidad and Tobago) | 2–1 | (Jamaica) Arnett Gardens |
|---|---|---|
| Joseph 2', 13' | Report | Reid 62' (pen.) |

Ato Boldon Stadium, Couva
Referee: Gladwyn Johnson (Guyana)

4 February 2018
17:00

| Arnett Gardens (Jamaica) | 4–0 | (Haiti) Real Hope |
|---|---|---|
| Reid 65', 86' (pen.), 90+2'; Strickland 90' | Report |

Ato Boldon Stadium, Couva
Referee: Oscar Macías (Mexico)
4 February 2018
20:00

| W Connection (Trinidad and Tobago) | 0–3 | (Dominican Republic) Atlético Pantoja |
|---|---|---|
| | Report | Espinal 27'; Maita 31'; López 65' (pen.) |

Ato Boldon Stadium, Couva
Referee: Juan Gabriel Calderón (Costa Rica)

=== Group B ===
Host venue: Estadio Cibao FC, Santiago de los Caballeros, Dominican Republic. All times local, AST (UTC−4).

| Pos | Team | Pld | W | D | L | GF | GA | GD | Pts | Qualification |
|---|---|---|---|---|---|---|---|---|---|---|
| 1 | (Trinidad and Tobago) Central | 3 | 2 | 0 | 1 | 4 | 2 | +2 | 6 | Final stage |
| 2 | (Jamaica) Portmore United | 3 | 1 | 1 | 1 | 4 | 3 | +1 | 4 | Final stage |
| 3 | (Dominican Republic) Atlántico (H) | 3 | 1 | 1 | 1 | 4 | 4 | 0 | 4 | |
| 4 | (Haiti) Racing | 3 | 1 | 0 | 2 | 2 | 5 | −3 | 3 | |

Source: CONCACAF
(H) Hosts
7 February 2018
17:00

| Central (Trinidad and Tobago) | 0–2 | (Jamaica) Portmore United |
|---|---|---|
| | Report | Morris 47'; Lynch 86' |

Estadio Cibao FC, Santiago de los Caballeros
Referee: Marco Antonio Ortiz (Mexico)
7 February 2018
20:00

| Atlántico (Dominican Republic) | 2–1 | (Haiti) Racing |
|---|---|---|
| Briceño 7' (pen.); Herrera 16' | Report | Charles 27' |

Estadio Cibao FC, Santiago de los Caballeros
Referee: Oshane Nation (Jamaica)

9 February 2018
17:00

| Racing (Haiti) | 0–3 | (Trinidad and Tobago) Central |
|---|---|---|
| | Report | Marcano 11'; Paul 40' (o.g.); Charles 49' |

Estadio Cibao FC, Santiago de los Caballeros
Referee: Trevester Richards (Saint Kitts and Nevis)
9 February 2018
20:00

| Atlántico (Dominican Republic) | 2–2 | (Jamaica) Portmore United |
|---|---|---|
| Cuica 77', 87' | Report | East 41'; Grandison 72' (pen.) |

Estadio Cibao FC, Santiago de los Caballeros
Referee: Ismael Cornejo (El Salvador)

11 February 2018
17:00

| Portmore United (Jamaica) | 0–1 | (Haiti) Racing |
|---|---|---|
| | Report | Daniel 27' |

Estadio Cibao FC, Santiago de los Caballeros
Referee: Sherwin Moore (Guyana)
11 February 2018
20:00

| Atlántico (Dominican Republic) | 0–1 | (Trinidad and Tobago) Central |
|---|---|---|
| | Report | Melo 60' (o.g.) |

Estadio Cibao FC, Santiago de los Caballeros
Referee: Oshane Nation (Jamaica)

== Final stage ==
Jamaica was announced as the host nation of the final stage on 1 May 2018. The matches were played between 11–16 May 2018.

=== Bracket ===
The semi-final matchups are:

- Group A Winners vs. Group B Runners-up
- Group B Winners vs. Group A Runners-up

Semi-finals
11 May
(Dominican Republic) Atlético Pantoja | 4
(Jamaica) Portmore United | 3
11 May
(Jamaica) Arnett Gardens | 2
(Trinidad and Tobago) Central | 0

Final
13 May
(Dominican Republic) Atlético Pantoja (p) | 0 (6)
(Jamaica) Arnett Gardens | 0 (5)
Third place
13 May
(Jamaica) Portmore United | 2
(Trinidad and Tobago) Central | 1

Host venue: Anthony Spaulding Sports Complex, Kingston, Jamaica. All times local, EST (UTC−5).

=== Semi-finals ===
11 May 2018
18:00

| Atlético Pantoja (Dominican Republic) | 4–3 | (Jamaica) Portmore United |
|---|---|---|
| Espinal 24', 45+1'; Centeno 30', 69' | Report | East 27', 34'; Lynch 52' |

Anthony Spaulding Sports Complex, Kingston
Referee: Jair Marrufo (United States)

11 May 2018
21:00

| Arnett Gardens (Jamaica) | 2–0 | (Trinidad and Tobago) Central |
|---|---|---|
| Edwards 35'; Morgan 55' | Report |

Anthony Spaulding Sports Complex, Kingston
Referee: Bryan López (Guatemala)

=== Third place match ===
Winners qualified for 2018 CONCACAF League. Losers advanced to CONCACAF League playoff against the 2018 CONCACAF Caribbean Club Shield winners for a place in the 2018 CONCACAF League.

13 May 2018
17:00

| Portmore United (Jamaica) | 2–1 | (Trinidad and Tobago) Central |
|---|---|---|
| Harriott 58'; Lynch 63' | Report | Muckette 27' |

Anthony Spaulding Sports Complex, Kingston
Referee: Kimbell Ward (Saint Kitts and Nevis)

=== Final ===
Winners qualified for 2019 CONCACAF Champions League. Losers qualified for 2018 CONCACAF League.

13 May 2018
20:00

| Atlético Pantoja (Dominican Republic) | 0–0 | (Jamaica) Arnett Gardens |
|---|---|---|
| | Report |
Penalties
| López (penalty scored); Rebollo (penalty scored); Centeno (penalty scored); Quintero (penalty scored); Maita (penalty missed); Russell (penalty scored); Báez (penalty scored) | 6–5 | (penalty scored) Russell; (penalty scored) Sterling; (penalty scored) Nesbeth; (penalty missed) Reid; (penalty scored) Jackson; (penalty scored) Johnson; (penalty missed) Martin |

Anthony Spaulding Sports Complex, Kingston
Referee: Joel Aguilar (El Salvador)

=== CONCACAF League playoff ===
Qualified teams from 2018 Caribbean club competitions
- CONCACAF Champions League: (Dominican Republic) Atlético Pantoja
- CONCACAF League: (Jamaica) Arnett Gardens (Jamaica) Portmore United (Martinique) Club Franciscain

The CONCACAF League playoff was played between the 2018 CONCACAF Caribbean Club Championship fourth-placed team, Central, and the 2018 CONCACAF Caribbean Club Shield winners, Club Franciscain, with the winners qualifying for the 2018 CONCACAF League.

16 May 2018
19:30

| Central (Trinidad and Tobago) | 1–2 | (Martinique) Club Franciscain |
|---|---|---|
| Wolfe 15' | Report | Maingé 27'; Marajo 45+1' |

Anthony Spaulding Sports Complex, Kingston
Referee: Yadel Martínez (Cuba)

== Top goalscorers ==
| Rank | Player | Team | Goals |
|---|---|---|---|
| 1 | (Dominican Republic) Luis Espinal | (Dominican Republic) Atlético Pantoja | 5 |
| 2 | (Jamaica) Fabian Reid | (Jamaica) Arnett Gardens | 4 |
| 3 | (Jamaica) Jovan East | (Jamaica) Portmore United | 3 |
| 3 | (Jamaica) Jeremie Lynch | (Jamaica) Portmore United | 3 |
| 5 | (Dominican Republic) Eduardo Centeno | (Dominican Republic) Atlético Pantoja | 2 |
| 5 | (Venezuela) Herlyn Cuica | (Dominican Republic) Atlántico | 2 |
| 5 | (Trinidad and Tobago) Marcus Joseph | (Trinidad and Tobago) W Connection | 2 |
| 5 | (Venezuela) Armando Maita | (Dominican Republic) Atlético Pantoja | 2 |

== See also ==
- 2018 Caribbean Club Shield
- 2018 CONCACAF League
- 2019 CONCACAF Champions League
