= 2016 Liga Dominicana de Fútbol season =

Liga Dominicana de Fútbol
- Season: 2016
- Champions: Barcelona Atlético
- Matches: 90
- Goals: 210 (2.33 per match)
- Top goalscorer: Anderson Arias
- Biggest home win: Universidad O&M 6–2 Bauger
- Biggest away win: Delfines del Este 1–4 Atlético San Cristóbal; Universidad O&M 0–3 Atlético Vega Real; Delfines del Este 1–4 Cibao; Universidad O&M 0–3 Atlético San Cristóbal
- Highest scoring: Universidad O&M 6–2 Bauger
- All statistics correct as of 12 June 2016.

The 2016 Liga Dominicana de Fútbol season (known as the LDF Banco Popular for sponsorship reasons) is the 2nd season of professional football in the Dominican Republic. Club Atlético Pantoja are the reigning champions, having won their first title last year.

== Stadia and locations ==
Each team will play 18 matches in the regular season, the 4 teams with most points qualify to the playoffs. The champion will be decided in a single-legged final.

Locations of Liga Dominicana de Fútbol clubs

Team	Location	Stadium	Capacity
Atlántico FC	Puerto Plata	Estadio Leonel Plácido	2,000
Atlético San Cristóbal	San Cristóbal	Estadio Panamericano	2,800
Atlético Vega Real	La Vega	Estadio Olímpico	7,000
Bauger FC	Santo Domingo	Estadio Olímpico Félix Sánchez	27,000
Cibao FC	Santiago	Estadio Cibao FC	5,000
Club Atlético Pantoja	Santo Domingo	Estadio Olímpico Félix Sánchez	27,000
Club Barcelona Atlético	Santo Domingo Este	Estadio Parque del Este	3,000
Delfines del Este FC	La Romana	Estadio Municipal La Romana	
Moca FC	Moca	Estadio Complejo Deportivo Moca 86	7,000
Universidad O&M F.C.	Santo Domingo	Estadio Olímpico Félix Sánchez	27,000

== League table ==
Pos	Team	Pld	W	D	L	GF	GA	GD	Pts	Qualification
1	Club Barcelona Atlético	18	11	5	2	23	11	+12	38	Championship Round
2	Cibao FC	18	11	2	5	30	17	+13	35	Championship Round
3	Club Atlético Pantoja	18	9	5	4	22	13	+9	32	Championship Round
4	Atlético San Cristóbal	18	7	7	4	31	22	+9	28	Championship Round
5	Atlético Vega Real	18	7	4	7	25	22	+3	25	
6	Atlántico FC	18	7	4	7	15	17	−2	25	
7	Moca FC	18	5	6	7	17	18	−1	21	
8	Universidad O&M F.C.	18	6	2	10	18	25	−7	20	
9	Bauger FC	18	5	3	10	17	23	−6	18	
10	Delfines del Este FC	18	2	2	14	12	42	−30	8	

Updated to match(es) played on 12 June 2016. Source: Soccerway
Rules for classification: 1) points; 2) fewer games lost; 3) goal difference; 4) goals scored

== Championship round ==
=== Semifinals ===
==== First leg ====
6 August 2016
16:30

Atlético San Cristóbal	1–1	Club Barcelona Atlético
Jeffson Aristil 27' (o.g.)		Cliff Cantave 25'

Estadio Panamericano, San Cristóbal

7 August 2016
16:30

Club Atlético Pantoja	1–1	Cibao FC
Darly Batista 80'		Woodensky Cherenfant 67'

Estadio Olimpico Felix Sanchez

==== Second leg ====
13 August 2016
17:00

Cibao FC	1–0	Club Atlético Pantoja
Domingo Peralta 75'

Estadio Cibao FC

Cibao FC wins 2–1 on aggregate

14 August 2016
16:00

Club Barcelona Atlético	3–0	Atlético San Cristóbal
Enson Rodríguez 40', 44', 48'

Estadio Olimpico Felix Sanchez

Club Barcelona Atlético wins 4–1 on aggregate

=== Final ===
21 August 2016
16:00

Club Barcelona Atlético	3–1	Cibao FC

Estadio Olimpico Felix Sanchez

== Results ==
Home \ Away	ATL	ASC	AVR	BAU	CIB	CAP	CBA	DDE	MOC	UO&M
Atlántico FC		2–1	2–0	2–1	1–0	1–0	0–1	0–1	1–2	1–0
Atlético San Cristóbal	2–3		2–1	0–0	3–0	0–0	0–2	3–3	1–0	3–1
Atlético Vega Real	1–1	1–1		1–0	1–2	0–1	1–1	3–1	3–2	2–0
Bauger FC	1–0	0–1	1–1		0–1	0–2	0–0	4–0	0–1	2–0
Cibao FC	3–0	3–3	2–1	3–0		2–1	1–0	5–0	1–0	1–0
Club Atlético Pantoja	1–0	2–2	1–2	2–1	1–0		0–1	3–0	0–0	2–1
Club Barcelona Atlético	0–0	2–1	3–2	2–1	1–0	1–1		3–0	2–1	1–0
Delfines del Este FC	0–0	1–4	1–0	1–3	1–4	1–2	0–1		0–1	0–1
Moca FC	2–0	1–1	1–2	0–1	1–1	1–1	2–2	2–1		0–0
Universidad O&M F.C.	1–1	0–3	0–3	6–2	3–1	0–2	1–0	3–1	1–0	

Source: Soccerway
Legend: Blue = home team win; Yellow = draw; Red = away team win.

== Top goalscorers ==
Rank	Player	Club	Goals
1	(Venezuela) Anderson Arias	Barcelona Atlético	11
2	(Haiti) Berthame Dine	Atlético Vega Real	10
3	(Dominican Republic) Domingo Peralta	Cibao FC	9
4	(Dominican Republic) Darly Batista	Atlético Pantoja	7
5	(Dominican Republic) Jonathan Faña	Cibao	6
–	(Dominican Republic) Luis Espinal	Atlético Pantoja	6
–	(Spain) Jorge Alonso	Atlético San Cristóbal	6
–	(Haiti) Bony Pierre	Bauger FC	6
–	(Dominican Republic) Kensy Guerrero	Atlético San Cristóbal	6
–	(Cuba) Marcel Hernández	Moca FC	6
11	(Uruguay) Pablo Cabrera	Atlético Pantoja	5
–	(Venezuela) Jose Felix Gutierrez	Universidad O&M FC	5
13	(Cameroon) Patrick Soko	Cibao FC	4
–	(Argentina) Luciano Copetti	Bauger FC	4
–	(Venezuela) Herlyn Cuica	Moca FC	4
–	(Haiti) Charles Herold Jr.	Cibao FC	4
–	(Venezuela) Wuiswell Isea	Atlántico FC	4
–	(Haiti) Kens Germain	Delfines del Este FC	4

=== Hat-tricks ===
Date	Player	Goals	Local	Result	Visiting	Week
10 April 2016	(Dominican Republic) Darly Batista	3' 13' 16'	Club Atlético Pantoja	3–0	Delfines del Este FC	Jornada 4
30 July 2016	(Dominican Republic) Domingo Peralta	16' 42' 72'	Cibao FC	5–0	Delfines del Este FC	Jornada 18
14 August 2016	(Venezuela) Enson Rodríguez	40' 44' 48'	Club Barcelona Atlético	3–0	Atlético San Cristóbal	Semifinals Second leg

=== Player of the week ===
Week	Player	Team
Week 1	(Haiti) Berthame Dine	Atlético Vega Real
Week 2	(Argentina) Luciano Copetti	Bauger FC
Week 3	(Venezuela) Anderson Arias	Club Barcelona Atlético
Weeka 4	(Dominican Republic) Darly Batista	Club Atlético Pantoja
Week 5	(Venezuela) Anderson Arias	Club Barcelona Atlético
Week 6	(Ghana) Dennis Agyekum	Atlético San Cristóbal
Week 7	(Dominican Republic) Wilman Modesta	Club Barcelona Atlético
Week 8	(Dominican Republic) Jonathan Faña	Cibao FC
Week 9	(Uruguay) Pablo Cabrera	Club Atlético Pantoja
Week 10	(Haiti) Ramon Excellente	Delfines del Este FC
Week 11	(Dominican Republic) Alexander Rodríguez	Cibao FC
Week 12	(Cuba) Marcel Hernandez	Moca FC
Week 13	(Haiti) Ergy Berkin	Universidad O&M FC
Week 14	(Spain) Jorge Alonso Martín	Atlético San Cristóbal
Week 15	(Venezuela) Cristian Casseres	Atlantico FC
Week 16		–
Week 17	(Spain) Jorge Alonso Martín	Club Atlético San Cristóbal
Week 18	(Dominican Republic) Domingo Peralta	Cibao FC
