= 2017 Liga Dominicana de Fútbol =

Liga Dominicana de Fútbol
- Season: 2017
- Champions: Atlántico FC
- Matches: 90
- Goals: 231 (2.57 per match)
- Top goalscorer: Armando Maita

The 2017 Liga Dominicana de Fútbol season (known as the LDF Banco Popular for sponsorship reasons) is the third season of professional football in the Dominican Republic. Club Barcelona Atlético are the reigning champions, having won their first title last year.

== Stadia and locations ==
Each team will play 18 matches in the regular season, the 4 teams with most points qualify to the playoffs. The champion will be decided in a single-legged final.

Locations of Liga Dominicana de Fútbol clubs

| Team | Location | Stadium | Capacity |
|---|---|---|---|
| Atlántico FC | Puerto Plata | Estadio Leonel Plácido | 2,000 |
| Atlético San Cristóbal | San Cristóbal | Estadio Panamericano | 2,800 |
| Atlético Vega Real | La Vega | Estadio Olímpico | 7,000 |
| Bauger FC | Santo Domingo | Estadio Olímpico Félix Sánchez | 27,000 |
| Cibao FC | Santiago | Estadio Cibao FC | 5,000 |
| Club Atlético Pantoja | Santo Domingo | Estadio Olímpico Félix Sánchez | 27,000 |
| Club Barcelona Atlético | Santo Domingo Este | Estadio Parque del Este | 3,000 |
| Delfines del Este FC | La Romana | Estadio Municipal La Romana | |
| Moca FC | Moca | Estadio Complejo Deportivo Moca 86 | 7,000 |
| Universidad O&M F.C. | Santo Domingo | Estadio Olímpico Félix Sánchez | 27,000 |

== League table ==
| Pos | Team | Pld | W | D | L | GF | GA | GD | Pts | Qualification |
|---|---|---|---|---|---|---|---|---|---|---|
| 1 | Cibao FC | 18 | 11 | 4 | 3 | 34 | 17 | +17 | 37 | Championship Round |
| 2 | Club Atlético Pantoja | 18 | 12 | 1 | 5 | 34 | 16 | +18 | 37 | Championship Round |
| 3 | Club Barcelona Atlético | 18 | 9 | 5 | 4 | 21 | 16 | +5 | 32 | Championship Round |
| 4 | Atlántico FC | 18 | 9 | 4 | 5 | 22 | 15 | +7 | 31 | Championship Round |
| 5 | Moca FC | 18 | 9 | 4 | 5 | 25 | 15 | +10 | 31 | |
| 6 | Atlético San Cristóbal | 18 | 7 | 4 | 7 | 23 | 24 | −1 | 25 | |
| 7 | Atlético Vega Real | 18 | 5 | 5 | 8 | 19 | 17 | +2 | 20 | |
| 8 | Bauger FC | 18 | 6 | 2 | 10 | 22 | 24 | −2 | 20 | |
| 9 | Universidad O&M F.C. | 18 | 6 | 1 | 11 | 20 | 30 | −10 | 19 | |
| 10 | Delfines del Este FC | 18 | 0 | 2 | 16 | 11 | 57 | −46 | 2 | |

Rules for classification: 1) points; 2) fewer games lost; 3) Head-to-head points; 4) Head-to-head goal difference; 5) Head-to-head goals scored; 6) goal difference; 7) goals scored

== Results ==
| Home \ Away | ATL | ASC | AVR | BAU | CIB | CAP | CBA | DDE | MOC | UO&M |
|---|---|---|---|---|---|---|---|---|---|---|
| Atlántico FC | | 1–0 | 1–0 | 1–1 | 1–0 | 1–2 | 0–1 | 0–1 | 3–1 | 1–0 |
| Atlético San Cristóbal | 0–0 | | 2–0 | 0–4 | 2–3 | 2–3 | 3–2 | 3–1 | 0–2 | 0–1 |
| Atlético Vega Real | 0–0 | 0–1 | | 0–1 | 2–0 | 0–1 | 2–0 | 5–2 | 1–1 | 1–0 |
| Bauger FC | 1–3 | 1–1 | 0–3 | | 1–2 | 0–2 | 0–1 | 2–0 | 0–1 | 2–1 |
| Cibao FC | 3–1 | 1–0 | 2–1 | 2–1 | | 3–1 | 2–2 | 4–0 | 2–2 | 1–0 |
| Club Atlético Pantoja | 2–0 | 1–2 | 1–0 | 2–0 | 2–1 | | 1–2 | 6–0 | 0–1 | 1–2 |
| Club Barcelona Atlético | 1–2 | 1–1 | 0–0 | 0–1 | 0–0 | 1–1 | | 1–0 | 2–1 | 2–0 |
| Delfines del Este FC | 0–3 | 1–3 | 1–1 | 0–5 | 1–7 | 0–5 | 0–1 | | 1–2 | 1–2 |
| Moca FC | 1–2 | 0–0 | 2–1 | 3–1 | 0–0 | 0–1 | 0–1 | 2–0 | | 2–0 |
| Universidad O&M F.C. | 0–2 | 2–3 | 2–2 | 2–1 | 1–0 | 1–2 | 2–3 | 4–2 | 0–4 | |

Source: Soccerway
Legend: Blue = home team win; Yellow = draw; Red = away team win.

== Championship round ==
=== Semifinals ===
==== First leg ====
5 August 2017
16:00 UTC-4

| Atlántico FC | 0–0 | Cibao FC |

Estadio Leonel Plácido, Puerto Plata

6 August 2017
16:00 UTC-4

| Club Barcelona Atlético | 1–3 | Club Atlético Pantoja |

Estadio Olímpico Félix Sánchez, Santo Domingo

==== Second leg ====
12 August 2017
17:00 UTC-4

| Club Atlético Pantoja | 2–0 | Club Barcelona Atlético |

Estadio Olímpico Félix Sánchez, Santo Domingo

Club Atlético Pantoja wins 5–1 on aggregate

13 August 2017
17:00 UTC-4

| Cibao FC | 0–0 (a.e.t.) | Atlántico FC |
Penalties
| | 2–4 |

Estadio Cibao FC, Santiago de los Caballeros

0–0 on aggregate. Atlántico FC won 4–2 on penalties.

=== Final ===
27 August 2017
17:00 UTC-4

| Club Atlético Pantoja | 1–1 | Atlántico FC |
Penalties
| | 3–4 |

Estadio Olímpico Félix Sánchez, Santo Domingo
Referee: Aníbal López (Venezuela)

== Awards ==
=== Top scorers ===
| Name | Team | Goals |
|---|---|---|
| (Venezuela) Armando Maita | Club Atlético Pantoja | 11 |
| (Argentina) Mauro Gómez | Atlántico FC | 10 |
| (Haiti) Woodensky Cherenfant | Cibao FC | 9 |
| (Haiti) Chedelin Francoeur | Moca FC | 8 |
| (Haiti) Charles Herold Jr. | Cibao FC | 8 |
| (Venezuela) Héctor García | Bauger FC | 7 |
| (Haiti) Berthame Dine | Atlético Vega Real | 6 |
| (Dominican Republic) Jonathan Faña | Moca FC | 6 |
| (Dominican Republic) Luis Espinal | Club Atlético Pantoja | 6 |
| (Venezuela) Jesús Meza | Club Barcelona Atlético | 5 |
| (Argentina) Pablo Marisi | Atlántico FC | 5 |
| (Dominican Republic) Edwin Martinez | Bauger FC | 5 |
| (Haiti) Sam Colson | Cibao FC | 4 |
| (Venezuela) Eduardo Centeno | Club Barcelona Atlético | 4 |

=== Player of the week ===
| Week | Player | Team |
|---|---|---|
| Week 1 | (Dominican Republic) Luis Lluberes | Bauger FC |
| Week 2 | (Venezuela) Anderson Arias | Universidad O&M F.C. |
| Week 3 | (Haiti) Gerald Gedna-Fritz | Atletico Vega Real |
| Week 4 | (Argentina) Mauro Gomez | Atlantico FC |
| Week 5 | (Dominican Republic) Luis Espinal | Club Atlético Pantoja |
| Week 6 | (Venezuela) Armando Maita | Club Atlético Pantoja |
| Week 7 | (Venezuela) Eduardo Centero | Club Atlético Pantoja |
| Week 8 | (Uruguay) Leandro Silva | Club Atlético Pantoja |
| Week 9 | (Colombia) Devis Gutiérrez | Universidad O&M F.C. |
| Week 10 | (Venezuela) Adrián Rodríguez | Moca FC |
| Week 11 | (Venezuela) Javier Toyo | Club Barcelona Atlético |
| Week 12 | (Dominican Republic) César García Peralta | Cibao FC |
| Week 13 | (Haiti) Berthame Dine | Atlético Vega Real |
| Week 14 | (Haiti) Chadelin Francoeur | Moca FC |
| Week 15 | (Dominican Republic) Edwin Martinez | Bauger FC |
| Week 16 | (Argentina) Juan Pablo Dominguez | Cibao FC |
| Week 17 | (Dominican Republic) Ronaldo Vásquez | Club Atlético Pantoja |
| Week 18 | (Cuba) Roberto Peraza | Bauger FC |
