= Santiago Gómez =

Santiago Gómez may refer to:

- Santiago Gómez Cou (1903–1984), Uruguayan-Argentine actor
- Santiago Gómez Cora (born 1978), Argentine rugby player
- Santiago Gómez (footballer, born 1995), Colombian football forward
- Santiago Gómez (footballer, born 1996), Argentine football forward
- Santiago Gómez (footballer, born 1998), Colombian football defender
- Santiago Gómez (footballer, born 2003), Venezuelan football Centre Back
