= 2015 Liga Dominicana de Fútbol =

Liga Dominicana de Fútbol
- Season: 2015
- Champions: Club Atlético Pantoja
- Matches: 90
- Goals: 254 (2.82 per match)
- Top goalscorer: Jonathan Faña (17)
- Biggest home win: Bauger FC 6–2 Delfines del Este
- Biggest away win: Delfines del Este 1–6 Baufer FC
- All statistics correct as of 23 December 2015.

The 2015 Liga Dominicana de Fútbol season (known as the LDF Banco Popular for sponsorship reasons) is the 1st since its establishment.

== Stadia and locations ==
Each team will play 18 matches in the regular season, the 4 teams with most points qualify to the playoffs. The champion will be decided in a single-legged final.

Locations of Liga Dominicana de Fútbol clubs

Team	Location	Stadium	Capacity
Atlántico FC	Puerto Plata	Estadio Leonel Plácido	2,000
Atlético San Cristóbal	San Cristóbal	Estadio Panamericano	2,800
Atlético Vega Real	La Vega	Estadio Olímpico	7,000
Bauger FC	Santo Domingo	Estadio Olímpico Félix Sánchez	27,000
Cibao FC	Santiago	Estadio Cibao FC	5,000
Club Atlético Pantoja	Santo Domingo	Estadio Olímpico Félix Sánchez	27,000
Club Barcelona Atlético	Santo Domingo Este	Estadio Parque del Este	3,000
Delfines del Este FC	La Romana	Estadio Municipal La Romana	
Moca FC	Moca	Estadio Bragaña García	7,000
Universidad O&M F.C.	Santo Domingo	Estadio Olímpico Félix Sánchez	27,000

== League table ==
Pos	Team	Pld	W	D	L	GF	GA	GD	Pts	Qualification
1	Bauger FC	18	13	1	4	44	22	+22	40	Championship Round
2	Moca FC	18	9	6	3	25	14	+11	33	Championship Round
3	Club Atlético Pantoja	18	9	4	5	24	19	+5	31	Championship Round
4	Atlántico FC	18	8	5	5	26	17	+9	29	Championship Round
5	Cibao FC	18	8	5	5	24	23	+1	29	
6	Universidad O&M F.C.	18	8	1	9	28	32	−4	25	
7	Club Barcelona Atlético	18	6	4	8	23	26	−3	22	
8	Atlético Vega Real	18	4	7	7	20	24	−4	19	
9	Atlético San Cristóbal	18	3	3	12	22	33	−11	12	
10	Delfines del Este FC	18	2	4	12	18	44	−26	10	

Updated to match(es) played on 23 December 2015. Source: LDF.com
Rules for classification: 1) points; 2) fewer games lost; 3) goal difference; 4) goals scored

== Championship round ==
=== Semifinals ===
==== First leg ====
25 July 2015
16:00

Atlántico FC	0–1	Bauger FC
	Report	Aristy 71'

Estadio Leonel Plácido, Puerto Plata

26 July 2015

Club Atlético Pantoja	2–1	Moca FC
Martínez 29'; Souza 39'		Peguero 57'

Estadio Olímpico Félix Sánchez, Santo Domingo

==== Second leg ====
1 August 2015
16:30

Moca FC	1–2	Club Atlético Pantoja
Carabali 28'	Report	Souza 11'; Batista 56'

Estadio Bragaña García, Moca

Club Atlético Pantoja wins 4–2 on aggregate

2 August 2015
16:00

Bauger FC	1–2	Atlántico FC
Aristy 22'	Report	Díaz 3'; Anderson Arias 81'

Estadio Olímpico Félix Sánchez, Santo Domingo

2–2 on aggregate. Atlántico FC won on away goals.

=== Finals ===
9 August 2015
16:00

Club Atlético Pantoja	2–2 (a.e.t.)	Atlántico FC
Cabrera 59'; Souza 77'	Report	Dine 11'; Arias 84'
Penalties
	3–1

Estadio Olímpico Félix Sánchez, Santo Domingo

2015 Liga Dominicana
de Fútbol

1st title

== Top goalscorers ==
As of 23 December 2015.

Rank	Player	Club	Goals
1	(Dominican Republic) Jonathan Faña	Bauger FC	17
2	(Haiti) Bony Pierre	Bauger FC	14
3	(Haiti) Berthame Dine	Atlantico FC	9
3	(Dominican Republic) Pablo Cabrera	Club Atlético Pantoja	9
5	(Spain) Aitor Ramirez	Cibao FC	7
5	(Venezuela) Anderson Arias	Atlantico FC	7
5	(Uruguay) Leandro Silva	Universidad O&M F.C.	7
5	(Canada) David Velastegui	Atlético San Cristóbal	7

=== Hat-tricks ===
Date	Player	Goals	Local	Result	Visiting	Week
3/8/2015	(Colombia) Daniel Vélez	5' 39' 46'	Atlético San Cristóbal	3–0	Delfines del Este FC	Jornada 1
4/12/2015	(Colombia) Richard Ibargüen	1' 28' 43'	Atlético Vega Real	5–2	Delfines del Este FC	Jornada 5
5/10/2015	(Dominican Republic) Jonathan Faña	8' 74' 81'	Bauger FC	4–1	Cibao FC	Jornada 9
5/24/2015	(Haiti) Bony Pierre	54' 74' 76'	Club Barcelona Atlético	2–3	Bauger FC	Jornada 11
5/31/2015	(Dominican Republic) Jonathan Faña	41' 56'(P) 79'	Bauger FC	5–1	Atlético San Cristóbal	Jornada 12
6/4/2015	(Dominican Republic) Jonathan Faña	21' 45' 88'(P)	Delfines del Este FC	1–6	Bauger FC	Jornada 13

=== Weekly awards ===
Week	Player	Team
Week 1	-	-
Week 2	-	-
Week 3	-	-
Week 4	-	-
Week 5	-	-
Week 6	(Dominican Republic) Domingo Peralta	Cibao FC
Week 7	(Uruguay) Leandro Silva	O&M FC
Week 8	-	-
Week 9	(Dominican Republic) Jonathan Faña	Bauger FC
Week 10	(Venezuela) Anderson Arias	Atlántico FC
Week 11	(Haiti) Bony Pierre	Bauger FC
Week 12	(Dominican Republic) Jonathan Faña	Bauger FC
Week 13	(Haiti) Alexandre Boucicaut	Moca FC
Week 14	(Dominican Republic) Erick Ozuna	Delfines del Este FC
Week 15	-	-
Week 16	(Haiti) Alexandre Boucicaut	Moca FC
Week 17	(Venezuela) Cristian Cásseres	Atlántico FC
Week 18	(Venezuela) Cristian Cásseres	Atlántico FC
Semifinal game 1	(Brazil) Jucselio De Souza	Club Atlético Pantoja
Semifinal Game 2	(Dominican Republic) Darly Batista	Club Atlético Pantoja
