= 2012 CFU Club Championship =

14th edition of the CFU Club Championship

2012 CFU Club Champions’ Cup

Tournament details
- Dates: March 25 – June 21, 2012
- Teams: 15 (from 9 associations)

Final positions
- Champions: (Trinidad and Tobago) Caledonia AIA (1st title)
- Runners-up: (Trinidad and Tobago) W Connection
- Third place: Puerto Rico Islanders
- Fourth place: (Antigua and Barbuda) Antigua Barracuda

Tournament statistics
- Matches played: 25
- Goals scored: 87 (3.48 per match)
- Attendance: 13,855 (554 per match)
- Top scorer: (Haiti) Bony Pierre (7 goals)

The 2012 CFU Club Champions’ Cup was the 14th edition of the CFU Club Championship, the annual international club football competition in the Caribbean region, held amongst clubs whose football associations are affiliated with the Caribbean Football Union (CFU). The top three teams in the tournament qualified for the 2012–13 CONCACAF Champions League.

== Participating teams ==
The following football clubs were entered into the competition. The four professional clubs (in bold) were seeded to directly enter the second round. Per CONCACAF regulations, only the professional clubs were eligible to play in the CONCACAF Champions League.

Association	Team	Qualification method
Antigua and Barbuda	**Antigua Barracuda**	— (playing in USL Pro)
Bermuda	North Village Rams	2010–11 Bermudian Premier Division champion
Cayman Islands	Elite	2010–11 Cayman Islands Premier League champion
Cayman Islands	George Town SC	2011 Cayman Islands FA Cup champion
Curaçao	Hubentut Fortuna	2010–11 Curaçao League champion
Curaçao	Barber	2010–11 Curaçao League runner-up
Guyana	Alpha United	2010 GFF National Super League champion (no league in 2011)
Guyana	Milerock	2010 GFF National Super League runner-up (no league in 2011)
Haiti	Victory	Haiti qualifying tournament 1st place (2010 Série de Clôture champion)
Haiti	Baltimore	Haiti qualifying tournament 2nd place (2011 Série de Ouverture champion)
Puerto Rico	**Puerto Rico Islanders**^{TH}	— (playing in NASL)
Puerto Rico	Bayamón FC	2011 Liga Nacional de Fútbol de Puerto Rico champion
Suriname	Inter Moengotapoe	2010–11 Hoofdklasse champion
Trinidad and Tobago	**Caledonia AIA**	2011–12 TT Pro League qualifying table 1st place
Trinidad and Tobago	**W Connection**	2011–12 TT Pro League qualifying table 2nd place

- th – Title holders

The following associations did not enter a team:

- Anguilla
- Aruba
- Bahamas
- Barbados
- British Virgin Islands
- Cuba
- Dominica
- Dominican Republic
- French Guiana
- Grenada
- Guadeloupe
- Jamaica
- Martinique
- Montserrat
- Saint Kitts and Nevis
- Saint Lucia
- Saint Martin
- Saint Vincent and the Grenadines
- Sint Maarten
- Turks and Caicos Islands
- United States Virgin Islands

== First round ==
Winner of each group and the best runner-up advanced to the second round.

=== Group 1 ===
Matches played at the Cayman Islands (host team: Elite).

Team	Pld	W	D	L	GF	GA	GD	Pts
(Cayman Islands) George Town SC	2	1	1	0	2	1	+1	4
(Cayman Islands) Elite	2	1	0	1	3	3	0	3
(Bermuda) North Village Rams	2	0	1	1	1	2	−1	1

March 25, 2012
19:00 UTC−05:00

George Town SC (Cayman Islands)	0 – 0	(Bermuda) North Village Rams
	Report

T.E. McField Sports Centre, George Town
Attendance: 1,800
Referee: Dwight Royal (Jamaica)

March 27, 2012
19:30 UTC−05:00

North Village Rams (Bermuda)	1 – 2	(Cayman Islands) Elite
Bean 60'	Report	Carter 13', 66'

T.E. McField Sports Centre, George Town
Attendance: 1,700
Referee: Kevin Thomas (Jamaica)

March 29, 2012
19:30 UTC−05:00

Elite (Cayman Islands)	1 – 2	(Cayman Islands) George Town SC
Wright 5'	Report	Malcolm 40'; Cuevas-Ebanks 87'

T.E. McField Sports Centre, George Town
Attendance: 300
Referee: Dwight Royal (Jamaica)

=== Group 2 ===
Matches played at Guyana (host team: Alpha United).

Team	Pld	W	D	L	GF	GA	GD	Pts
(Suriname) Inter Moengotapoe	3	3	0	0	11	3	+8	9
(Guyana) Alpha United	3	2	0	1	5	2	+3	6
(Curaçao) Hubentut Fortuna	3	1	0	2	5	7	−2	3
(Guyana) Milerock	3	0	0	3	2	11	−9	0

April 17, 2012
16:00 UTC−04:00

Milerock (Guyana)	1 – 2	(Curaçao) Hubentut Fortuna
Sears 31'	Report	Trenidad 69'; Gomes Chacas 79'

Providence Stadium, Providence
Attendance: 100
Referee: Rudolph Angela (Aruba)
April 17, 2012
18:00 UTC−04:00

Alpha United (Guyana)	0 – 1	(Suriname) Inter Moengotapoe
	Report	Rijssel 23'

Providence Stadium, Providence
Attendance: 100
Referee: Javier Santos (Puerto Rico)

April 19, 2012
16:00 UTC−04:00

Inter Moengotapoe (Suriname)	7 – 1	(Guyana) Milerock
Rijssel 8', 87'; Adensiba 28'; Pinas 52'; Jimmy 62' (pen.), 76' (pen.); Plein 86'	Report	Fordyce 45'

Providence Stadium, Providence
Attendance: 100
Referee: Christophel Stewart (Cayman Islands)
April 19, 2012
18:00 UTC−04:00

Hubentut Fortuna (Curaçao)	1 – 3	(Guyana) Alpha United
Flaneur 59'	Report	Murray 5'; Abrams 25'; Wilson 84'

Providence Stadium, Providence
Attendance: 150
Referee: Adrian Skeete (Barbados)

April 21, 2012
16:00 UTC−04:00

Inter Moengotapoe (Suriname)	3 – 2	(Curaçao) Hubentut Fortuna
Jimmy 44'; Vlijter 65'; Rijssel 70'	Report	Gomes Chacas 45'; Belliot 60'

Providence Stadium, Providence
Attendance: 50
Referee: Javier Santos (Puerto Rico)
April 21, 2012
18:00 UTC−04:00

Alpha United (Guyana)	2 – 0	(Guyana) Milerock
Abrams 7', 80'	Report

Providence Stadium, Providence
Attendance: 50
Referee: Christophel Stewart (Cayman Islands)

=== Group 3 ===
Matches played at Haiti.

Team	Pld	W	D	L	GF	GA	GD	Pts
(Haiti) Victory	2	1	1	0	6	2	+4	4
(Haiti) Baltimore	2	1	1	0	3	1	+2	4
(Puerto Rico) Bayamón FC	2	0	0	2	1	7	−6	0

- (Curaçao) Centro Barber withdrew.
April 17, 2012
17:00 UTC−04:00

Baltimore (Haiti)	2 – 0	(Puerto Rico) Bayamón FC
Titin 7'; Dieujuste 82'	Report

Stade Sylvio Cator, Port-au-Prince
Attendance: 2,000
Referee: Marcos Brea (Cuba)

April 19, 2012
17:00 UTC−04:00

Bayamón FC (Puerto Rico)	1 – 5	(Haiti) Victory
Rosario 64'	Report	B. Pierre 22', 57', 73', 82'; Charles 45'

Stade Sylvio Cator, Port-au-Prince
Attendance: 250
Referee: David Rubalcaba (Cuba)

April 21, 2012
17:00 UTC−04:00

Baltimore (Haiti)	1 – 1	(Haiti) Victory
T. Pierre 86'	Report	B. Pierre 90+2'

Stade Sylvio Cator, Port-au-Prince
Attendance: 3,500
Referee: Sandy Vásquez (Dominican Republic)

=== Best runner-up ===
To determine the best runner-up, since Groups 1 and 3 have three teams each compared to four for Group 2, the results of the last-place team in Group 2 – Milerock – were voided and the standings recalculated.

Grp	Team	Pld	W	D	L	GF	GA	GD	Pts
3	(Haiti) Baltimore	2	1	1	0	3	1	+2	4
2	(Guyana) Alpha United	2	1	0	1	3	2	+1	3
1	(Cayman Islands) Elite	2	1	0	1	3	3	0	3

== Second round ==
Winner and runner-up of each group advanced to the final round.

=== Group 1 ===
Matches played at the Cayman Islands (host team: George Town SC).

Team	Pld	W	D	L	GF	GA	GD	Pts
Puerto Rico Islanders	2	1	1	0	8	0	+8	4
(Trinidad and Tobago) Caledonia AIA	2	1	1	0	5	0	+5	4
(Cayman Islands) George Town SC	2	0	0	2	0	13	−13	0

- (Haiti) Baltimore withdrew after the team was denied visas to the Cayman Islands.
May 21, 2012
19:30 UTC−05:00

Puerto Rico Islanders	0 – 0	(Trinidad and Tobago) Caledonia AIA
	Report

T.E. McField Sports Centre, George Town
Attendance: 100
Referee: Raymond Bogle (Jamaica)

May 23, 2012
19:30 UTC−05:00

Caledonia AIA (Trinidad and Tobago)	5 – 0	(Cayman Islands) George Town SC
Jorsling 47', 70'; Caesar 72', 76'; Smith 80'	Report

T.E. McField Sports Centre, George Town
Attendance: 200
Referee: Caswell Cambridge (Saint Vincent and the Grenadines)

May 25, 2012
19:30 UTC−05:00

George Town SC (Cayman Islands)	0 – 8	Puerto Rico Islanders
	Report	Ramos 4', 20'; Faña 22', 54', 56'; Elliott 27' (o.g.); Richardson 44'; Robinson 61' (o.g.)

T.E. McField Sports Centre, George Town
Attendance: 300
Referee: Wilson da Costa (Bahamas)

=== Group 2 ===
Matches played at Trinidad and Tobago (host team: W Connection).

Team	Pld	W	D	L	GF	GA	GD	Pts
(Antigua and Barbuda) Antigua Barracuda	3	2	1	0	5	1	+4	7
(Trinidad and Tobago) W Connection	3	2	0	1	9	2	+7	6
(Haiti) Victory	3	1	1	1	8	4	+4	4
(Suriname) Inter Moengotapoe	3	0	0	3	2	17	−15	0

May 6, 2012
17:30 UTC−04:00

W Connection (Trinidad and Tobago)	2 – 0	(Haiti) Victory
Arcia 16', 77'	Report

Manny Ramjohn Stadium, San Fernando
Attendance: 300
Referee: Trevor Taylor (Barbados)
May 6, 2012
19:30 UTC−04:00

Antigua Barracuda (Antigua and Barbuda)	3 – 0	(Suriname) Inter Moengotapoe
Thomas 9', 89'; Griffith 43'	Report

Manny Ramjohn Stadium, San Fernando
Attendance: 260
Referee: Osiel Nuñez (Puerto Rico)

May 8, 2012
17:30 UTC−04:00

Victory (Haiti)	0 – 0	(Antigua and Barbuda) Antigua Barracuda
	Report

Manny Ramjohn Stadium, San Fernando
Attendance: 200
Referee: Javier Jauregui (Curaçao)
May 8, 2012
19:30 UTC−04:00

Inter Moengotapoe (Suriname)	0 – 6	(Trinidad and Tobago) W Connection
	Report	Winchester 3', 52'; Arcia 31', 59'; Cupid 42'; R. Britto 64'

Manny Ramjohn Stadium, San Fernando
Attendance: 250
Referee: Sherwin Johnson (Guyana)

May 10, 2012
17:30 UTC−04:00

Inter Moengotapoe (Suriname)	2 – 8	(Haiti) Victory
Misiedjan 39', 45'	Report	Charles 1', 56', 79', 90+2'; Toussaint 3'; B. Pierre 32', 75'; Beaugé 51'

Manny Ramjohn Stadium, San Fernando
Attendance: 390
Referee: Trevor Taylor (Barbados)
May 10, 2012
19:30 UTC−04:00

W Connection (Trinidad and Tobago)	1 – 2	(Antigua and Barbuda) Antigua Barracuda
Dublin 21' (o.g.)	Report	Aldred 37'; Byers 42'

Manny Ramjohn Stadium, San Fernando
Attendance: 400
Referee: Osiel Nuñez (Puerto Rico)

== Final round ==
In the semifinals, the two second-round group winners played against the runners-up from the opposite group. The semifinal winners played in the final while the losers played in the third place match.

Matches played at Trinidad and Tobago.

Semi-finals
(Antigua and Barbuda) Antigua Barracuda	0
(Trinidad and Tobago) Caledonia AIA	2
(Puerto Rico) PR Islanders	1
(Trinidad and Tobago) W Connection	4

Final
(Trinidad and Tobago) Caledonia AIA (p)	1 (4)
(Trinidad and Tobago) W Connection	1 (3)
Third place
(Antigua and Barbuda) Antigua Barracuda	0
(Puerto Rico) PR Islanders	2

=== Semifinals ===
June 19, 2012
18:00 UTC−04:00

Antigua Barracuda (Antigua and Barbuda)	0 – 2	(Trinidad and Tobago) Caledonia AIA
	Report	Abu Bakr 65'; Jorsling 86'

Manny Ramjohn Stadium, San Fernando
Attendance: 305
Referee: Jermain Elskamp (Suriname)

June 19, 2012
20:00 UTC−04:00

Puerto Rico Islanders	1 – 4	(Trinidad and Tobago) W Connection
Hansen 76'	Report	R. Britto 28', 66'; J. Britto 58'; Arcia 90'

Manny Ramjohn Stadium, San Fernando
Attendance: 400
Referee: Trevor Taylor (Barbados)

=== Third place match ===
June 21, 2012
18:00 UTC−04:00

Antigua Barracuda (Antigua and Barbuda)	0 − 2	Puerto Rico Islanders
	Report	Hansen 19'; Faña 52' (pen.)

Manny Ramjohn Stadium, San Fernando
Attendance: 250
Referee: Adrian Skeete (Barbados)

=== Final ===
June 21, 2012
20:00 UTC−04:00

Caledonia AIA (Trinidad and Tobago)	1 – 1 (a.e.t.)	(Trinidad and Tobago) W Connection
Abu Bakr 97'	Report	Leon 103'
Penalties
Moore (penalty scored); Jorsling (penalty scored); Smith (penalty scored); Edwards (penalty missed); David (penalty scored)	4 – 3	(penalty scored) Leon; (penalty missed) Cupid; (penalty scored) Jones; (penalty scored) Arcia; (penalty missed) Peltier

Manny Ramjohn Stadium, San Fernando
Attendance: 400
Referee: Antonius Pinas (Suriname)

CFU Club Championship
2012 winners
(Trinidad and Tobago)
Caledonia AIA
1st title

Caledonia AIA, W Connection, and Puerto Rico Islanders qualified for the Group Stage of the 2012–13 CONCACAF Champions League.

== Top goalscorers ==
Rank	Player	Team	Goals
1	(Haiti) Bony Pierre	(Haiti) Victory	7
2	(Trinidad and Tobago) Hashim Arcia	(Trinidad and Tobago) W Connection	5
2	(Haiti) Ricardo Charles	(Haiti) Victory	5
4	(Dominican Republic) Jonathan Faña	Puerto Rico Islanders	4
4	(Suriname) Stefano Rijssel	(Suriname) Inter Moengotapoe	4
6	(Guyana) Anthony Abrams	(Guyana) Alpha United	3
6	(Trinidad and Tobago) Rennie Britto	(Trinidad and Tobago) W Connection	3
6	(Trinidad and Tobago) Devorn Jorsling	(Trinidad and Tobago) Caledonia AIA	3
6	(Suriname) Patrick Jimmy	(Suriname) Inter Moengotapoe	3
10	(Trinidad and Tobago) Radanfah Abu Bakr	(Trinidad and Tobago) Caledonia AIA	2
10	(Trinidad and Tobago) Trevin Caesar	(Trinidad and Tobago) Caledonia AIA	2
10	(Cayman Islands) Mario Rene Carter	(Cayman Islands) Elite	2
10	(Curaçao) Jose Adriano Gomes Chacas	(Curaçao) Hubentut Fortuna	2
10	(Puerto Rico) Josh Hansen	Puerto Rico Islanders	2
10	(Suriname) Ricardo Misiedjan	(Suriname) Inter Moengotapoe	2
10	(Puerto Rico) Héctor Ramos	Puerto Rico Islanders	2
10	(Antigua and Barbuda) Tamorley Thomas	(Antigua and Barbuda) Antigua Barracuda	2
10	(Trinidad and Tobago) Shahdon Winchester	(Trinidad and Tobago) W Connection	2
