= Cristo Espuny =

Spanish-born Dominican footballer

Cristo
Personal information
- Full name: Cristopher Espuny Reynoso
- Date of birth: 30 October 1994 (age 31)
- Place of birth: Catalonia, Spain
- Position: Forward

Team information
- Current team: Atlántico
- Number: 19

Youth career
- –2013: Amposta

Senior career*
Years	Team	Apps	(Gls)
2012–	Amposta	138	(4)
2016	→ Atlántico (loan)		
2017	→ Atlántico (loan)		
2018	→ Atlántico (loan)		

International career^{‡}
2018–	Dominican Republic	2	(0)
- * Club domestic league appearances and goals ‡ National team caps and goals as of 25 March 2018

Cristopher Espuny Reynoso (born 30 October 1994), commonly known as Cristo, is a Spanish-born Dominican footballer who plays as a forward for Atlántico FC and the Dominican Republic national team. He is signed to Spanish club CF Amposta.

== Club career ==
Formed in CF Amposta, Cristo alternates Amposta with Atlántico FC since the 2016 Liga Dominicana de Fútbol season.

== International career ==
Cristo was eligible to play for Dominican Republic through his mother. He made his debut on 22 March 2018, playing an entire 4–0 friendly win against Turks and Caicos Islands

== Honors and awards ==
=== Clubs ===
Atlántico

- Liga Dominicana de Fútbol: 2017
