= Espuny =

Espuny is a Catalan surname. Notable people with the surname include:

- Cristo Espuny (born 1994), Spanish-born Dominican footballer
- Miguel Báez Espuny (1930–2022), Spanish bullfighter
