= Adrián Salcedo =

Dominican footballer

Personal information
- Full name: Adrián José Salcedo de Jesús
- Date of birth: 24 October 1994 (age 32)
- Place of birth: Santo Domingo, Dominican Republic
- Height: 1.75 m (5 ft 9 in)
- Positions: Right midfielder; right back

Team information
- Current team: Atlántico

Youth career
- 200?–2010: CD San Francisco
- 2010–2012: Mallorca
- 2012: CD San Francisco
- 2013: SD La Salle

Senior career*
Years	Team	Apps	(Gls)
2011	Mallorca B	1	(0)
2013–2014	Constància	9	(0)
2015	Alcúdia	17	(0)
2015–2016	Montuïri	15	(1)
2016	Atlántico	?	(1)
2016–2017	Santanyí	3	(0)
2017–2018	Atlántico		
2019-2022	Cibao	33+	(0)
2023	Moca	9	(0)
2024-	Atlántico	21	(1)

International career^{‡}
2016–2019	Dominican Republic	5	(0)
- * Club domestic league appearances and goals as of 11 May 2025 ‡ National team caps and goals as of 11 May 2025

Adrián José Salcedo de Jesús (born 24 October 1994) is a Dominican footballer who plays for Atlántico FC and the Dominican Republic national team as a midfielder. He also holds Spanish citizenship.

== Club career ==
Born in Santo Domingo, Salcedo moved to the Balearic Islands as a child and began playing football there when he was nine. He graduated from RCD Mallorca's youth setup. He made his senior debuts with the reserves in the 2011–12 season, in Segunda División B.

In the 2013 summer Salcedo joined another Spanish third division side, CE Constància. He only played three matches in the 2013–14 campaign and the team descended to Tercera División.

Salcedo began the next season as a player of 90 minutes for Constància, but he was injured in Week 6. After his recovery, in January 2015, he joined fellow Tercera División team UE Alcúdia where remained until the end of the season. In total, he played 23 games in the 2014/2015 campaign – 6 for Constància and 17 for Alcúdia.

In the 2015 summer Salcedo joined another Spanish fourth division side, CD Montuïri, and after playing 15 matches with them, scoring once, he signed for Atlántico FC in mid January 2016 to compete in the Liga Dominicana de Fútbol of that year. After finishing league in the Dominican Republic, in August 2016, he went back to Balearic football to play for Preferente's team Santanyí two months later.

He returned to Atlántico in March 2017.

== International career ==
Salcedo made his international debut for Dominican Republic on 4 June 2016, as a second half substitution in a 1–0 away win against Bermuda for the 2017 Caribbean Cup qualification.
