= Maita =

Maita is a surname. Notable people with the surname include:

- Armando Maita (born 1981), Venezuelan footballer
- Kiyoshi Maita (真板 潔, born 1959), Japanese golfer
- Luísa Maita (born 1982), Brazilian singer-songwriter

== See also ==
- Maita Gomez (1947–2012), Filipino beauty pageant winner and activist
