= Pavel Bergaglio =

Italian footballer

Personal information
- Full name: Pavel Estefan Bergaglio Cruz
- Date of birth: March 2000 (age 26)
- Height: 1.78 m (5 ft 10 in)
- Position: Defender

Team information
- Current team: Cibao
- Number: 24

Youth career
- 2017–: Cibao

Senior career*
Years	Team	Apps	(Gls)
2020–	Cibao	0	(0)

International career
2015	Dominican Republic U15		
- * Club domestic league appearances and goals as of 18:04, 30 January 2021 (UTC)

Pavel Estefan Bergaglio Cruz (born March 2000) is an Italian professional footballer who plays as a defender for Cibao.

== Career statistics ==
=== Club ===
As of 30 January 2021.

Club	Season	League			Cup		Continental		Other		Total	
Club	Season	Division	Apps	Goals	Apps	Goals	Apps	Goals	Apps	Goals	Apps	Goals
Cibao	2020	LDF Banco Popular	0	0	0	0	1 (Note: Appearances in the CONCACAF League)	0	0	0	1	0
Career total			0	0	0	0	1	0	0	0	1	0
