= Santiago Gómez (footballer, born 1998) =

Colombian footballer (born 1998)

Personal information
- Full name: Santiago Gómez Realpe
- Date of birth: 27 May 1998 (age 28)
- Place of birth: Pasto, Nariño, Colombia
- Height: 1.80 m (5 ft 11 in)
- Positions: Right-back; winger

Team information
- Current team: La Equidad
- Number: 21

Youth career
- EdF Club Javeriano
- 2016: Patriotas Boyacá
- 2017: Dragon Force Bogotá
- 2018: Deportivo Pasto

Senior career*
Years	Team	Apps	(Gls)
2018–2019	Deportivo Pasto	0	(0)
2020	Atlántico	4	(2)
2022–2023	Deportivo Pasto	14	(0)
2024–	La Equidad	10	(0)
- * Club domestic league appearances and goals as of 23:04, 28 April 2024 (UTC)

Santiago Gómez Realpe (born 27 May 1998) is a Colombian footballer currently playing as a right-back for La Equidad.

== Early life ==
Gómez was born in Pasto in the Nariño Department of Colombia to Giraldo Gómez, a former amateur footballer who played in Sandoná, also in the Nariño Department. As a child, Gómez studied at the Liceo de la Universidad de Nariño, where he also played football.

== Club career ==
Having played football since the age of four with his cousins on local pitches, Gómez's first club in organised football was the Escuela de Fútbol Club Javeriano, where he stayed until the age of fifteen. He was a contestant on Colombian television show Sueño Fútbol, broadcast on RCN Televisión in 2016. Having finished in the top twenty-two players, he was offered contracts at both Patriotas Boyacá and Deportivo Pasto, joining the former in mid-2016. He was later approached by an affiliate of Portuguese club Porto in Bogotá, where Sueño Fútbol had taken place.

In 2018 he was signed by Deportivo Pasto, and having initially played for their under-20 squad, he was promoted to the first team mid-way through his first season. He was named once on the bench during his time with the club, in a Categoría Primera A fixture against his previous club, Patriotas Boyacá, though he did not feature.

The following year, having left Deportivo Pasto, he travelled to the Dominican Republic, and eventually signed with Liga Dominicana de Fútbol side Atlántico. The 2020 campaign was interrupted by the COVID-19 pandemic; scheduled to start in March, it was postponed until 9 October. Having made his debut on 18 October, Gómez scored his first goal for the club a week later on 25 October, the only goal in a 1–0 win against Cibao; having come on as a late substitute for Welkin Luis, he received the ball inside the penalty area two minutes later from compatriot Over García, before scoring past Cibao goalkeeper Miguel Lloyd. His second goal for the club came on 7 November: the third of a 3–0 win against Jarabacoa.

He returned to Colombia in 2021, and asked Deportivo Pasto manager Flabio Torres if he could train with the club. After spending over a year on trial, including being involved in the first team's pre-season preparations, he was offered a contract in July 2022. He made his first appearance for the club on 15 September of the same year, playing ninety minutes in a 2–0 away loss to Deportivo Cali.

== Career statistics ==
=== Club ===
As of 28 April 2024.

Appearances and goals by club, season and competition
Club	Season	League			Cup		Other		Total	
Club	Season	Division	Apps	Goals	Apps	Goals	Apps	Goals	Apps	Goals
Deportivo Pasto	2018	Categoría Primera A	0	0	0	0	0	0	0	0
Atlántico	2020	LDF	4	2	0	0	0	0	4	2
Deportivo Pasto	2022	Categoría Primera A	1	0	0	0	0	0	1	0
Deportivo Pasto	2023	Categoría Primera A	0	0	0	0	0	0	0	0
Deportivo Pasto	2024	Categoría Primera A	12	0	0	0	0	0	12	0
Deportivo Pasto	Total		13	0	0	0	0	0	13	0
Career total			17	2	0	0	0	0	17	2
