= Miguel Báez =

Miguel Báez may refer to:

- Miguel Odalis Báez (born 1983), Dominican footballer
- Miguel Báez Espuny (1930–2022), Spanish bullfighter known as "El Litri"
