= Barcelona Atlético =

Barcelona Atlético may refer to:

- FC Barcelona B, football club in Spain, formerly known as FC Barcelona Atlétic.
- Club Barcelona Atlético, football club in the Dominican Republic.
