= Jorge Márquez (footballer, born 1988) =

Venezuelan footballer

Personal information
- Full name: Jorge Luis Márquez Gómez
- Date of birth: 25 June 1988 (age 38)
- Place of birth: Maracay, Venezuela
- Height: 1.69 m (5 ft 6 1/2 in)
- Position: Midfielder

Team information
- Current team: Bauger
- Number: 8

Senior career*
Years	Team	Apps	(Gls)
2007–2009	Aragua	11	(2)
2010–2011	Arroceros de Calabozo FC	18	(4)
2011–2012	Unión Atlético Aragua FC	20	(7)
2012–2013	Carabobo	11	(2)
2013–2014	Zulia	6	(0)
2014–2015	Ortiz FC	21	(10)
2015	Atlántico	10	(4)
2016–	Bauger	?	(3)
Total		97	(31)
- * Club domestic league appearances and goals as of 2007

Jorge Luis Márquez Gómez, also known as Anelka, (born June 1988) is a Venezuelan football midfielder who plays for Bauger FC in the Liga Dominicana de Fútbol.

== Club career ==
Its beginnings and motivation for soccer born in San Jose Academy and the San Jacinto school there was beginning to form Jorge Anelka Marquez. After its start in these small schools, Jorge comes to the UCV FC where he participated in the under-17 category, then he joined the Aragua FC where he participated in the Under 20 and manages to give the jump to the professional level. His long-awaited debut in the first division reaches his 18 years in the hands of Professor Manolo Contreras with Aragua FC confronting him where Vigia FC got the victory 2 goals to 1 in the Olympic Hermanos Ghersi Páez in Maracay Stadium. In 2007, he was champion of Venezuela Cup in the Aragua FC with only 18 years old. Then passing through the Carabobo FC at the time the club was in the second division of the Venezuelan professional football, Jorge Marquez achieved promotion to the first division with the club. Notably, Jorge Marquez was in the call for Aragua FC for the 2008 Copa Sudamericana in the two matches of the first phase vs Chivas de Guadalajara, phase where the Aragua FC would stay out of the tournament in a global score of 3 -2 for Chivas.
