= Christian Sund =

Finnish footballer (born 1978)

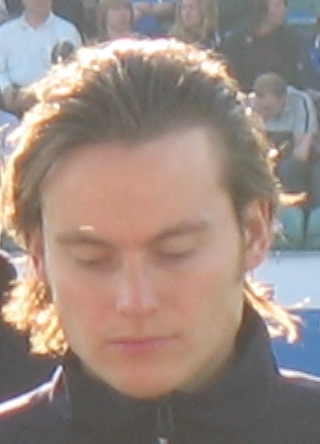
- Sund in 2006

Personal information
- Date of birth: 24 December 1978 (age 47)
- Place of birth: Vaasa, Finland
- Height: 1.79 m (5 ft 10 1/2 in)
- Position: Midfielder

Team information
- Current team: Ekenäs IF (manager)

Youth career
- BK IFK
- Crewe Alexandra

Senior career*
Years	Team	Apps	(Gls)
1995–1996	BK IFK	40	(11)
1997–1998	Öster	0	(0)
1999–2002	VPS	91	(10)
1999	→ BK IFK (loan)	3	(0)
2003	HJK	18	(1)
2004–2007	Lahti	59	(2)
2005–2006	→ Stabæk (loan)	17	(0)
2008	VIFK	25	(7)
2009–2010	JJK	31	(2)
2011–2012	SJK	51	(4)
2013–2014	VIFK	22	(1)

Managerial career
- 2018: VPS II
- 2019: VPS (assistant)
- 2019–2020: VPS
- 2021: KPV (assistant)
- 2022–2023: KPV
- 2024: KTP (assistant)
- 2024–: Ekenäs IF
- * Club domestic league appearances and goals

Christian Sund (born 24 December 1978) is a Finnish football coach and a former player. He is the head coach of Ekenäs IF (EIF) in Ykkösliiga.

== Coaching career ==
After retiring, Sund worked as a youth coach for Vasa IFK and later SJK. In 2018, he took charge of VPS's B-team and later became assistant manager of the first team in the beginning of 2019. In the summer 2019, he was appointed manager of the club.

On 17 November 2021, he signed a two-year contract as the head coach of KPV, beginning in the 2022 season.

On 14 November 2023, it was announced that Sund joins Ykkösliiga club KTP as their new assistant manager.

After the dismissal of Gabriel Garcia Xatart, in August 2024 Sund was named the head coach of Ekenäs IF in Veikkausliiga. He couldn't help the club from relegating, but extended his contract with EIF for the next 2025 Ykkösliiga season.

== Career statistics ==
=== Club ===
As of 4 October 2024.

Appearances and goals by club, season and competition
Club	Season	League			Cups (Note: Includes Suomen Cup, Norwegian Football Cup and Finnish League Cup)		Europe		Total	
Club	Season	Division	Apps	Goals	Apps	Goals	Apps	Goals	Apps	Goals
BK-IFK	1995	Kakkonen	18	2	–		–		18	2
BK-IFK	1996	Kakkonen	22	9	–		–		22	9
BK-IFK	Total		40	11	0	0	0	0	40	11
Östers IF	1997	Allsvenskan	0	0	–		3 (Note: Appearances in UEFA Intertoto Cup)	0	3	0
Östers IF	1998	Allsvenskan	0	0	–		–		0	0
Östers IF	Total		0	0	0	0	3	0	3	0
VPS	1999	Veikkausliiga	12	0	–		0	0	12	0
VPS	2000	Veikkausliiga	27	2	–		–		27	2
VPS	2001	Veikkausliiga	31	6	–		–		31	6
VPS	2002	Veikkausliiga	21	2	–		–		21	2
VPS	Total		91	10	0	0	0	0	91	10
BK-IFK (loan)	1999	Kakkonen	3	0	–		–		3	0
HJK Helsinki	2003	Veikkausliiga	18	1	0	0	3 (Note: Appearances in UEFA Champions League)	0	21	1
Lahti	2004	Veikkausliiga	25	2	–		–		25	2
Lahti	2005	Veikkausliiga	0	0	–		–		0	0
Lahti	2006	Veikkausliiga	11	0	–		–		11	0
Lahti	2007	Veikkausliiga	23	0	–		–		23	0
Lahti	Total		59	2	0	0	0	0	59	2
Stabæk (loan)	2005	1. divisjon	13	0	3	0	–		16	0
Stabæk (loan)	2006	Tippeligaen	4	0	–		–		4	0
Stabæk (loan)	Total		17	0	3	0	0	0	20	0
Stabæk 2 (loan)	2005	3. divisjon	1	0	–		–		1	0
VIFK	2008	Ykkönen	25	7	–		–		25	7
JJK Jyväskylä	2009	Veikkausliiga	24	1	6	0	–		30	1
JJK Jyväskylä	2010	Veikkausliiga	13	1	1	0	–		14	1
JJK Jyväskylä	Total		37	2	7	0	0	0	44	2
SJK Seinäjoki	2011	Kakkonen	27	3	–		–		27	3
SJK Seinäjoki	2012	Ykkönen	24	1	1	1	–		25	2
SJK Seinäjoki	Total		51	4	1	1	0	0	52	5
VIFK	2013	Kakkonen	22	1	–		–		22	1
Career total			364	38	11	1	6	0	381	39

=== Manager ===
As of 19 October 2024

Team	Nat	From	To	Record				
Team	Nat	From	To	G	W	D	L	Win %
VPS	(Finland)	8 July 2019	31 December 2020	40	14	10	16	35.00
KPV	(Finland)	1 January 2022	31 December 2023	69	23	18	28	33.33
Ekenäs IF	(Finland)	13 August 2024	present	8	1	4	3	12.50
Total				117	38	32	47	32.48
