= Odalis Báez =

Dominican footballer

Personal information
- Full name: Miguel Odalis Báez Camino
- Date of birth: 29 September 1983 (age 43)
- Place of birth: La Romana, Dominican Republic
- Height: 1.88 m (6 ft 2 in)
- Position: Goalkeeper

Team information
- Current team: Atlético Pantoja
- Number: 23

Senior career*
| Years | Team | Apps | (Gls) |
| 2004 | Kristiansund BK | | |
| 2004–2005 | La Romana FC | | |
| 2006 | America (RJ) | | |
| 2007–2009 | Cerrito | 30 | (0) |
| 2009–2010 | Atlético Barcelona | | |
| 2011–2014 | Antigua Barracuda FC | 0 | (0) |
| 2015 | Barcelona Atlético | 16 | (0) |
| 2016–2021 | Pantoja | 43+ | (0) |
| 2022-2024 | Moca | 79 | (0) |
| 2025 | Atlantico | 8 | (0) |
| 2025- | Salcedo | 7 | (0) |

International career^{‡}
| 2002–2016 | Dominican Republic | 6 | (0) |
- * Club domestic league appearances and goals as of 11 November 2025 ‡ National team caps and goals as of 14 June 2015

Miguel Odalis Báez Camino (born 29 September 1983), known as Odalis Báez, is a Dominican footballer who plays for Liga Dominicana club Atlético Pantoja and the Dominican Republic national team.
