= Javier Toyo =

Venezuelan footballer (born 1977)

Personal information
- Full name: Javier Eduardo Toyo Bárcenas
- Date of birth: 12 October 1977 (age 49)
- Place of birth: Caracas, Venezuela
- Height: 1.80 m (5 ft 11 in)
- Position: Goalkeeper

Youth career
- Caracas FC

Senior career*
Years	Team	Apps	(Gls)
1998–1999	Caracas FC		
1999–2000	El Vigía	4	(0)
2000–2007	Caracas FC	208	(0)
2007–2008	Atlético Bucaramanga	11	(0)
2008–2010	Caracas FC	0	(0)
2010–2012	Real Esppor Club	19	(0)
2012–2014	Atlético Venezuela	69	(0)
2014–2016	Metropolitanos	33	(0)
2016—2017	Club Barcelona Atlético	21	(0)

International career^{‡}
2004–2008	Venezuela	10	(0)
- * Club domestic league appearances and goals as of 18:47, 2 April 2009 (UTC) ‡ National team caps and goals as of May 31, 2008

Javier Eduardo Toyo Bárcenas (born 12 October 1977, in Caracas) is a Venezuelan football goalkeeper. He was a member of the Venezuela national football team.

== Professional club career ==
Toyo began playing football for the youth squad of Primera División Venezolana club Caracas FC and signed a professional contract with the club in 1998. After the 1998-99 season, he joined Atlético El Vigía Fútbol Club for one season before returning to Caracas FC.

Toyo played the following six seasons for Caracas FC primarily as the starting goalkeeper, appearing in over 200 league matches. In December 2007, Toyo transferred to Colombian club Atlético Bucaramanga, where he was primarily an unused substitute. After only a few months in Colombia, he returned to Caracas FC to get more first team football and signed a new contract through 2009.

Toyo participated in the Copa Libertadores 2007 with Caracas FC, and was noted for a strong performance in the match which sealed their progression to the round of 16, a 3–1 victory against Argentine club River Plate on 6 April 2007.

== National team career ==
Toyo made his first appearance for the Venezuela national football team as a second-half substitute in a friendly match against Jamaica on 28 April 2004. Toyo has appeared in 10 international matches for Venezuela from 2004 through 2008.

Toyo was a member of the Venezuelan team at the Copa América 2007. He was an unused substitute in all four of Venezuela's matches.
