= Gabriel Garcia Xatart =

Spanish football manager (born 1988)

Personal information
- Date of birth: 1 June 1988 (age 38)
- Place of birth: Manresa, Spain

Team information
- Current team: Atlántico (manager)

Managerial career
- Years: Team
- 2016: Levadia II (assistant)
- 2016: Flora (assistant)
- 2017: Paide (assistant)
- 2018–2019: Ekenäs IF
- 2020: PEPO
- 2021: KTP (assistant)
- 2021: KTP
- 2022: TPS (assistant)
- 2023–2024: Ekenäs IF
- 2025–: Atlántico

Gabriel Garcia Xatart (born 1 June 1988) is a Spanish football manager who is the manager of Atlántico in Liga Dominicana de Fútbol.

== Career ==
Xatart started his coaching career in Estonia in 2016. He worked as an assistant of head coach Argo Arbeiter in Levadia II, Flora and Paide Linnameeskond.

In January 2018, he was named the head coach of Ekenäs IF in Finnish second-tier Ykkönen.

On 23 September 2019, Xatart was named the head coach of PEPO Lappeenranta, starting in January 2020 in Finnish third-tier Kakkonen.

In 2021, he joined newly promoted Veikkausliiga club Kotkan Työväen Palloilijat (KTP) as an assistant coach, reuniting with head coach Arbeiter. From July to September 2021, Xatart worked as the manager of KTP.

During the 2022 season, he worked for Turun Palloseura as an assistant coach and the reserve team head coach.

In January 2023, he returned to EIF and managed the club to win the Ykkönen title and earn the promotion to Veikkausliiga, for the first time in 90 years and only the second time in the club's entire history. He was dismissed on 10 August 2024 and was replaced by Christian Sund. Prior to Xatart's departure, EIF had a record of 3 wins, 3 draws and 13 losses in Veikkausliiga.

== Managerial statistics ==
Team	Nat	From	To	Record				
Team	Nat	From	To	G	W	D	L	Win %
Ekenäs IF	(Finland)	1 January 2018	30 June 2019	50	21	13	16	42.00
PEPO Lappeenranta	(Finland)	1 January 2020	3 August 2020	9	2	4	3	22.22
KTP	(Finland)	1 July 2021	14 September 2021	10	0	3	7	0.00
Ekenäs IF	(Finland)	1 January 2023	10 August 2024	64	31	11	22	48.44
Atlántico	(Dominican Republic)	12 February 2025	present	11	4	5	2	36.36
Total				144	58	36	50	40.28

== Honours ==
EIF

- Ykkönen: 2023
