= Dennis Agyekum =

Ghanaian footballer

Personal information
- Full name: Dennis Ohene Agyekum
- Date of birth: 1 July 1996 (age 30)
- Place of birth: Accra, Ghana
- Position: Midfielder

Team information
- Current team: GD Resende
- Number: 21

Youth career
- West African Football Academy
- 2014–2015: Vitória de Guimarães
- 2016: Prozis Academy

Senior career*
Years	Team	Apps	(Gls)
2016	C.A. San Cristóbal		
–2017	Sport Clube da Régua	6	(2)
2017–	GD Resende		

International career
- Ghana U17
- * Club domestic league appearances and goals

Dennis Ohene Agyekum (born 1 July 1996) is a Ghanaian footballer who is attached to GD Resende in Portugal as of 2017.

== Career ==
Agyekum was born in Accra, Ghana.

=== Dominican Republic ===
Scoring two goals in the 53rd and 65th minutes to help San Cristóbal beat Delfines del Este 4–1 in the 2016 Liga Dominicana de Fútbol, Agyekum was handed the Player of the Week Award for his performances that round.

=== International ===
Back in 2012, the Ghanaian midfielder suffered an injury which would be detrimental to his career as it caused him to get dropped from the Ghana Under-17s.
