= Bony Pierre =

Haitian footballer (born 1991)

Personal information
- Date of birth: 24 April 1991 (age 35)
- Place of birth: Haiti
- Position: Striker

Team information
- Current team: Club Barcelona Atletico
- Number: 11

Senior career*
| Years | Team | Apps | (Gls) |
| 2010–2011 | Victory SC | | |
| 2011 | F.C. New York | 5 | (0) |
| 2012–2014 | Victory SC | 8 | (11) |
| 2015–2017 | Bauger FC | 13+ | (20) |
| 2017– | Club Barcelona Atletico | | |

International career^{‡}
| 2013– | Haiti | 1 | (0) |
- * Club domestic league appearances and goals ‡ National team caps and goals as of 10 November 2012

Bony Pierre (born 24 April 1991) is a Haitian footballer who plays as a striker. He played for Victory Sportif Club. He plays for Club Barcelona Atletico and the Haiti national football team.

== Individual ==
- 2012 CFU Club Championship Top scorer - (7 goals)
