= Luis Rodríguez (Dominican footballer) =

Dominican footballer (born 1996)

Luis Rodriguez
Personal information
- Full name: Luis Alexander Rodríguez Polanco
- Date of birth: 2 October 1996 (age 30)
- Place of birth: La Vega, Dominican Republic
- Height: 1.85 m (6 ft 1 in)
- Position: Goalkeeper

Team information
- Current team: Cibao FC
- Number: 1

Senior career*
Years	Team	Apps	(Gls)
2015–	Cibao FC	16	

International career
2014	Dominican Republic		
- * Club domestic league appearances and goals

Luis Alexander Rodríguez Polanco (born 2 octubre 1996) is a Dominican footballer who plays as a goalkeeper in Liga Dominicana de Fútbol for Cibao FC and the Dominican Republic.

== Early life ==
From a young age he has emerged as champion in categories Kid, Children, and Junior in Don Bosco School. Played in several major tournaments in La Vega province, winning the championship in different occasions, also winning valuable player. Rodriguez has participated in Primera División de Republica Dominicana teams with representatives Jarabacoa FC and Club Deportivo Domingo Salvio.

== Achievements ==
- Cibao FC

Copa Dominicana de Fútbol champion: 2015

== External sources ==
http://www.cibaofc.com/equipo-cibaofc/
