= Kern Cupid =

Trinidad and Tobago footballer

Personal information
- Full name: Kern Cupid
- Date of birth: November 4, 1984 (age 41)
- Place of birth: Chaguanas, Trinidad and Tobago
- Position: Defender

Youth career
- W Connection Youth Team

Senior career*
Years	Team	Apps	(Gls)
2005–2013	W Connection		
2013–2016	Club Sando F.C.		

International career^{‡}
2007–2012	Trinidad and Tobago	21	(0)
- * Club domestic league appearances and goals as of 27 January 2010 ‡ National team caps and goals as of 25 July 2011

Kern Cupid (born November 4, 1984) is a Trinidadian former professional footballer who played as a defender. He was a member of the Trinidad and Tobago national football team, making his international debut against El Salvador in October 2007 in a friendly match.
