= Luis Espinal (footballer) =

Dominican Republic footballer (b. 1994)

Personal information
- Full name: Luis José Espinal Florencio
- Date of birth: 20 February 1994 (age 32)
- Place of birth: Dominican Republic
- Height: 1.70 m (5 ft 7 in)
- Position: Forward

Team information
- Current team: Atlético Pantoja
- Number: 7

Senior career*
Years	Team	Apps	(Gls)
2011–2021	Atlético Pantoja	75+	(37)
2021-2022	Moca FC	41	(8)
2022-	Atlético Pantoja	90	(42)

International career^{‡}
2011	Dominican Republic U17	3	(0)
2013	Dominican Republic U20	3	
2016–	Dominican Republic	12	(5)
- * Club domestic league appearances and goals as of 17 February 2026 ‡ National team caps and goals as of 19 September 2024

Luis José Espinal Florencio (born 20 February 1994) is a Dominican professional footballer who plays as a forward for Liga DF club Atlético Pantoja and the Dominican Republic national team.

== International career ==
Espinal made his formal debut for Dominican Republic on 22 March 2018, being a second-half substitute in a 4–0 friendly win against Turks and Caicos Islands. He had faced Puerto Rico, Martinique and Nicaragua (twice) between 2016 and 2017, but none of these matches were recognised by FIFA.

=== International goals ===
Scores and results list Dominican Republic's goal tally first

No.	Date	Venue	Opponent	Score	Result	Competition
1.	28 August 2016	Estadio Panamericano, San Cristóbal, Dominican Republic	Puerto Rico	4–0	5–0	Friendly
2.	9 November 2017	Estadio Cacique Diriangén, Diriamba, Nicaragua	Nicaragua	2–0	3–0	Friendly
3.	22 March 2018	Estadio Olímpico Félix Sánchez, Santo Domingo, Dominican Republic	Turks and Caicos Islands	2–0	4–0	Friendly
4.	25 March 2018	Estadio Cibao FC, Santiago de los Caballeros, Dominican Republic	Saint Kitts and Nevis	1–0	2–1	Friendly
5.	27 March 2021	Inter Miami CF Stadium, Fort Lauderdale, United States	Anguilla	6–0	6–0	2022 FIFA World Cup qualification

== Honors and awards ==
=== Clubs ===
Deportivo Pantoja

- Primera División de Republica Dominicana: 2011–12

Atlético Pantoja

- Liga Dominicana de Fútbol: 2015
- Caribbean Club Championship: 2018
