= Eduardo Centeno =

Dominican Republic footballer (b. 1984)

Personal information
- Full name: Eduardo Ernesto Centeno Jiménez
- Date of birth: 30 May 1984 (age 42)
- Place of birth: Sán Felix, Venezuela
- Height: 1.78 m (5 ft 10 in)
- Position: Centre-back

Team information
- Current team: Atlético Pantoja

Senior career*
Years	Team	Apps	(Gls)
2006	Mineros de Guayana	2	(0)
2006–2007	Carabobo	18	(0)
2007–2010	Mineros de Guayana	36	(4)
2010–2011	Caroní	14	(0)
2011–2012	Guaros de Lara		
2012–2013	Carabobo		
2013–2015	Angostura		
2015	Academia Puerto Cabello		
2016	Angostura		
2017	Barcelona Atlético		
2018–	Atlético Pantoja		

International career^{‡}
2018–	Dominican Republic	1	(0)
- * Club domestic league appearances and goals ‡ National team caps and goals as of 22 March 2018

Eduardo Ernesto Centeno Jiménez (born 30 May 1984) is a footballer who plays as a centre-back for Liga Dominicana club Atlético Pantoja. Born in Venezuela, he represented the Dominican Republic at international level.

== International career ==
Centeno was eligible to play for Dominican Republic through his mother. His formal debut was on 25 March 2018, being a second-half substitute in a 2–1 friendly win against Saint Kitts and Nevis. He had played two friendly matches in November 2017 against Nicaragua, but they were not recognised by FIFA.
