= 2020 Liga Dominicana de Fútbol =

Liga Dominicana de Fútbol
- Season: 2020
- Champions: O&M
- Matches played: 32
- Goals scored: 85 (2.66 per match)
- Top goalscorer: Haiti Daniel Jamesley (7 goals)

The 2020 Liga Dominicana de Fútbol was the sixth season of the LDF. This most important soccer tournament in the country, organized by the Dominican Soccer Federation Dominican Football Federation, was scheduled to begin in the second week of March, but was postponed due to the COVID-19 pandemic. 10 teams participated in the competition. The tournament was in three phases (regular phase – liguilla phase – play-off phase).

On September 24, the change of format to the group stage was announced, which began on October 9. It was scheduled to end on December 13.

The Liga Dominicana de Futbol tournament is made up of two parts:

- 'Group stage:' A group stage system will be played divided into 2 circuits: 'North Circuit' and 'South Circuit' . Each team will play a total of 6 matches in their respective circuit in their own field and in the opposite field. The first place of each circuit will qualify directly to the semifinals, while the second and third place of each circuit will qualify for the playoffs.

== Competition system ==
The order of classification of the teams will be determined in a general calculation table, as follows:

1. Higher number of points;
2. Greater goal difference in favor; in case of equality;
3. Higher number of goals scored; in case of equality;
4. Highest number of away goals scored; in case of equality;
5. Less amount of red cards received; in case of equality;
6. Less quantity of yellow cards received; in case of equality;
7. Draw.
- 'Final phase:' An elimination system will be played, in which the teams qualified to the repechage will play a single match, the winners will play against those directly qualified to the semifinals in two games, and the winners of this will play the Grand Final 'two-legged.

=== Qualification for international competitions ===
The champion and runner-up of the 'Grand Final' will have a place in the CFU Club Championship

== Participating teams ==
A total of 8 teams will compete in the 2020 Tournament.

=== Teams by Province ===
Province	N.º	Teams
Distrito Nacional	2	Club Atlético Pantoja y O&M FC
La Vega	2	Atlético Vega Real y Jarabacoa FC
Puerto Plata	2	Atlántico FC y Pantoja FC
La Romana	1	Delfines del Este FC
San Cristóbal	1	Atlético San Cristóbal
Santiago Province	1	Cibao FC

=== Team Information ===
Team	Manager	City	Stadium	Capacity	Establish	Sponsors	Uniforms
Atlántico FC	(Venezuela) Miguel Ángel Acosta	Puerto Plata	Estadio Leonel Plácido	2,000	2014	(Dominican Republic) Ocean World (Dominican Republic) Farmacia Popular	(Dominican Republic) Batu Wear
Atlético Pantoja	(Argentina) Alejandro Trionfini	Santo Domingo	Félix Sánchez Olympic Stadium	27,000	1999	(Dominican Republic) Banco BHD León (Dominican Republic) Laboratorios Rowe	(Peru) Walon Sport
Atlético San Cristóbal	(Venezuela) Johannes Hernández	San Cristóbal	Estadio Panamericano	2,800	2014	(China) Loncin Holdings	(Dominican Republic) Batú Wear
Atlético Vega Real	(Argentina) Nahuel Bernabei	La Vega	Estadio Olímpico	7,000	2014	(Dominican Republic) Angloamericana de Seguros (Dominican Republic) Alaver	(Dominican Republic) LAF Sport
Cibao FC	(Argentina) Jorge Alfonso	Santiago de los Caballeros	Estadio Cibao FC	10,000	2014	(Dominican Republic) Banreservas	(Germany)
Delfines del Este FC	(Dominican Republic) Edward Acevedo	La Romana	Estadio Municipal La Romana	1,200	2014	—	(Mexico) Bee Sport
Jarabacoa FC	(Dominican Republic) Pedro Estévez	Jarabacoa	Estadio Olímpico	7,000	1986	(Dominican Republic) Banreservas (Dominican Republic) QA Company SRL	(Dominican Republic) Batú Wear
Pantoja	(Argentina) Alejandro Trionfini	Sosúa	Estadio Leonel Plácido	27,000	1962	(Dominican Republic) Banco BHD León (Dominican Republic) Laboratorios Rowe	(Peru) Walon Sport
O&M FC	(Dominican Republic) Ronald Batista	Santo Domingo	Félix Sánchez Olympic Stadium	27,000	1974	(Dominican Republic) Universidad Dominicana O&M	(Dominican Republic) HEB

- The Atlético San Francisco and Moca FC were not included.

==== North Circuit ====
Team / Match	01	02	03	04	05	06
Cibao FC	2	1	2	1	1	1
Atlántico FC	3	3	1	2	3	2
Atlético Vega Real	1	2	3	3	2	3
Jarabacoa FC	4	4	4	4	4	4

==== South Circuit ====
Team / Match	01	02	03	04	05	06
O&M FC	1	1	1	1	1	1
Delfines del Este FC	3	4	3	2	2	2
Atlético San Cristóbal	4	2	4	4	3	3
Atlético Pantoja	2	3	2	3	4	4

== Play-offs ==
Quarter-finals
2.B	Delfines del Este	2
3.A	Atlético Vega Real	1
2.A	Atlántico	1
3.B	Atlético San Cristóbal	3

Semi-finals
1.A	Cibao FC	1	0	1
2.B	Delfines del Este	2	1	3
1.B	O&M FC	3	2	5
3.B	Atlético San Cristóbal	0	1	1

Final
2.B	Delfines del Este	0	1	1
1.B	O&M FC	2	2	4
