= Vishinul Harris =

Jamaican footballer (born 1993)

Personal information
- Date of birth: 28 July 1993 (age 33)
- Height: 1.83 m (6 ft 0 in)
- Position: Midfielder

Team information
- Current team: Arnett Gardens

Senior career*
Years	Team	Apps	(Gls)
2011–	Arnett Gardens	82	(13)

International career^{‡}
2017–	Jamaica	1	(0)
- * Club domestic league appearances and goals as of 12:52, 21 January 2018 (UTC) ‡ National team caps and goals as of 12:52, 21 January 2018 (UTC)

Vishinul Harris (born 28 July 1993) is a Jamaican international footballer who plays for Arnett Gardens, as a midfielder.

== Career ==
=== Arnett Gardens ===
Harris is a midfield stalwart for Arnett Gardens F.C.

== International ==
He made his national team debut in 2017.

== Honors ==
2016/2017 RSPL
