= Darren Mitchell =

Trinidadian footballer

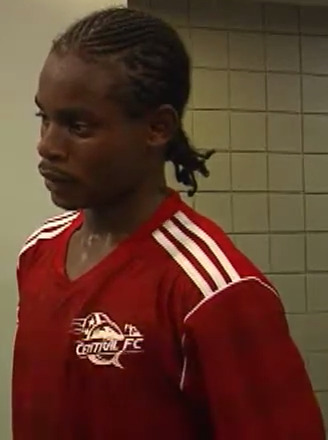
- Mitchell at an interview in 2013

Personal information
- Full name: Darren Dwayn Aaron Mitchell
- Date of birth: 10 January 1990 (age 36)
- Place of birth: Princes Town, Trinidad, Trinidad and Tobago
- Position: Midfielder

Team information
- Current team: Guastatoya

Senior career*
Years	Team	Apps	(Gls)
- Tobago Phoenix
2013–2017	Central		
2017	Davao Aguilas	0	(0)
2017–2018	Guastatoya	12	(1)
2018	Central		
2018–2019	San Juan Jabloteh		
2021	Fort Worth Vaqueros		
2022	Dallas Sidekicks (indoor)	1	(0)
2022–	Texas Outlaws (indoor)	39	(4)

International career
2012–	Trinidad and Tobago	3	(0)
- * Club domestic league appearances and goals

Darren Dwayn Aaron Mitchell is a Trinidadian international footballer who last played for Central F.C. of the TT Pro League as a midfielder. He is currently a free agent.

== Early life and career ==
Mitchell was born on 10 January 1990 in Princes Town in the island of Trinidad where he spent his early years but identifies himself as a Tobagonian having several relatives and friends in Tobago. He attended the Scarborough Secondary.

== Club career ==
It was during his time attending the secondary school when he started his football career and joined the Tobago Phoenix under coach Terry William's request. During the January/December window of the 2012-13 TT Pro League, Mitchell moved to Central F.C.

In March 2017, Mitchell was reportedly signed in by Davao Aguilas F.C. of the Philippines Football League. He was released by the club before the beginning of the season.

Mitchell later reportedly moved to Guatemalan club Deportivo Guastatoya in June 2017.

== International career ==
In March 2013, Mitchell earned his first call up for the Trinidad and Tobago national football team. By March 2017, Mitchell has already made three caps for Trinidad and Tobago, all in friendlies.
