= Clyde Leon =

Trinidad and Tobago footballer (1983–2021)

Personal information
- Date of birth: 8 December 1983
- Place of birth: Laventille, Trinidad and Tobago
- Date of death: 28 April 2021 (aged 37)
- Height: 1.90 m (6 ft 3 in)
- Position: Midfielder

Senior career*
Years	Team	Apps	(Gls)
2001–2002	Arima Fire		
2003–2011	W Connection		
2011	Itagüí Ditaires	0	(0)
2012–2013	W Connection		

International career
2004–2012	Trinidad and Tobago	48	(1)
- * Club domestic league appearances and goals

Clyde Leon (8 December 1983 – 28 April 2021) was a Trinidadian soccer player who played as a midfielder for Arima Fire and W Connection in his native Trinidad and Tobago, and for Itagüí Ditaires in Colombia. Leon scored 90 goals in 230 matches for W Connection. At international level, he made 48 appearances for the Trinidad and Tobago national team scoring once.

== Death ==
Leon died aged 37 in April 2021.
