= Estadio Bragaña García =

Coordinates: 19°23′15″N 70°32′00″W

- Interactive map of Estadio Bragaña García
- Location: Moca, Espaillat, Dominican Republic
- Owner: Province Espaillat Government
- Operator: Moca FC
- Capacity: 4,000
- Surface: grass

Tenant
- Moca FC

Estadio Bragaña García is a baseball stadium in Moca, Dominican Republic. In 2015 it hosted the home games of Moca FC of the Liga Dominicana de Fútbol before they moved to Estadio Complejo Deportivo Moca 86. The stadium holds 4,000 spectators.
