= Santiago Gómez (footballer, born 1995) =

Colombian footballer (born 1995)

Personal information
- Full name: Santiago Gómez Castrillón
- Date of birth: 17 May 1995 (age 31)
- Place of birth: Medellín, Antioquia, Colombia
- Height: 1.79 m (5 ft 10 in)
- Position: Forward

Team information
- Current team: Coatepeque
- Number: 9

Youth career
- UPB
- Envigado
- Atlético Nacional
- 2014: Leones

Senior career*
Years	Team	Apps	(Gls)
- Ditaires
2021	Carchá	8	(5)
2021	Malacateco	8	(1)
2021–2022	Marquense	40	(25)
2022	Deportes Quindío	24	(6)
2023–	Coatepeque		
- * Club domestic league appearances and goals as of 23:04, 13 August 2023 (UTC)

Santiago Gómez Castrillón (born 17 May 1995) is a Colombian footballer currently playing as a forward for Guatemalan side Coatepeque.

== Club career ==
Born in Medellín in the Antioquia Department of Colombia, Gómez began his career with local side UPB, before spending time in the academies of professional clubs Envigado and Atlético Nacional. After a short spell with Leones, he moved to Mexico to trial with Toros Neza, but suffered an injury, ruling him out for four months, and he returned to Colombia. He underwent surgery in February 2015, and did not play football again until the following year, when he played football for the University of Antioquia. In 2017, he joined Itagüí-based side Ditaires.

He moved to Guatemala in January 2021, initially joining Carchá, before moving on to Malacateco. Ahead of the 2021–22 season, he joined Marquense, stating that "it would be nice to be in the history of the team". He was the league's top scorer in the 2021 Apertura season with ten goals.

Having returned to Colombia with Categoría Primera B side Deportes Quindío for 2022, he left the club at the end of the year, following interest from first-division sides. In January 2023, Jaguares de Córdoba announced that they had signed Gómez, confirming that he had signed a two-year deal. However, they later deleted this announcement, despite Gómez having already trained with the team, and he was released from the club, having reportedly not been in the plans of new manager Carlos Restrepo. Gómez stated in an interview with Noticias RCN that the club told him there was an issue with his paperwork, and he was still registered with Deportes Quindío, despite Deportes Quindío being able to prove that he was not. He also said that Restrepo had called him, explaining that he did not know about the situation and had expected to see Gómez in training.

Following his collapsed deal with Jaguares de Córdoba, he returned to Guatemala, joining Coatepeque.

== Career statistics ==
=== Club ===
As of 13 August 2023.

Appearances and goals by club, season and competition
Club	Season	League			Cup		Other		Total	
Club	Season	Division	Apps	Goals	Apps	Goals	Apps	Goals	Apps	Goals
Carchá	2020–21	Primera División de Ascenso	8	5	0	0	0	0	8	5
Malacateco	2020–21	Liga Nacional de Guatemala	8	1	0	0	0	0	8	1
Carchá	2021–22	Primera División de Ascenso	40	25	0	0	0	0	40	25
Deportes Quindío	2022	Categoría Primera B	24	6	0	0	0	0	24	6
Coatepeque	2023–24	Liga Nacional de Guatemala	2	0	0	0	0	0	2	0
Career total			82	37	0	0	0	0	82	37
