= Darly Batista =

Dominican footballer

Personal information
- Full name: Darly Noemi Batista
- Date of birth: 8 July 1988 (age 38)
- Place of birth: Villa Montellano, Dominican Republic
- Height: 1.73 m (5 ft 8 in)
- Position: Forward

Team information
- Current team: Atlético Pantoja
- Number: 9

Senior career*
Years	Team	Apps	(Gls)
2008	Montellano FC		
2009–2012	Atlético Pantoja		
2012	Don Bosco FC		
2013	Bauger		
2014–2020	Atlético Pantoja	?	(12+)
2021	Atlántico FC	18	(3)
2021-2022	Atlético Vega Real	22	(0)
2023-	Atlántico FC	71	(18)

International career^{‡}
2006–2019	Dominican Republic	18	(9)
- * Club domestic league appearances and goals as of 2 December 2025 ‡ National team caps and goals as of 23 March 2024

Darly Noemi Batista (born 8 July 1988) is a Dominican footballer who plays as a forward for Atlético Pantoja in the Liga Dominicana de Fútbol.

== Career statistics ==
=== International ===
Appearances and goals by national team and year
National team	Year	Apps	Goals
Dominican Republic	2006	2	1
Dominican Republic	2007	–	
Dominican Republic	2008	1	0
Dominican Republic	2009	–	
Dominican Republic	2010	2	5
Dominican Republic	2011	3	0
Dominican Republic	2012	–	
Dominican Republic	2013	–	
Dominican Republic	2014	–	
Dominican Republic	2015	2	1
Dominican Republic	2016	5	2
Dominican Republic	2017	–	
Dominican Republic	2018	1	0
Dominican Republic	2019	2	0
Total		18	9

Scores and results list Dominican Republic's goal tally first, score column indicates score after each Batista goal.

List of international goals scored by Darly Batista
No.	Date	Venue	Opponent	Score	Result	Competition
1	26 November 2006	Bourda Cricket Ground, Georgetown, Guyana	Antigua and Barbuda	2–0	2–0	2007 Caribbean Cup qualification
2	14 October 2010	Estadio Panamericano, San Cristóbal, Dominican Republic	British Virgin Islands	1–0	17–0	2010 Caribbean Cup qualification
3	14 October 2010	Estadio Panamericano, San Cristóbal, Dominican Republic	British Virgin Islands	8–0	17–0	2010 Caribbean Cup qualification
4	14 October 2010	Estadio Panamericano, San Cristóbal, Dominican Republic	British Virgin Islands	9–0	17–0	2010 Caribbean Cup qualification
5	14 October 2010	Estadio Panamericano, San Cristóbal, Dominican Republic	British Virgin Islands	10–0	17–0	2010 Caribbean Cup qualification
6	14 October 2010	Estadio Panamericano, San Cristóbal, Dominican Republic	British Virgin Islands	13–0	17–0	2010 Caribbean Cup qualification
7	13 May 2015	Estadio Cibao, Santiago de los Caballeros, Dominican Republic	Cayman Islands	3–0	6–0	Friendly
7	29 March 2016	Estadio Olímpico Félix Sánchez, Santo Domingo, Dominican Republic	Barbados	1–0	2–0	2017 Caribbean Cup qualification
8	29 March 2016	Estadio Olímpico Félix Sánchez, Santo Domingo, Dominican Republic	Barbados	2–0	2–0	2017 Caribbean Cup qualification
