= Armando Maita =

Venezuelan footballer (born 1981)

Personal information
- Full name: Armando Rafael Maita Urbáez
- Date of birth: August 26, 1981 (age 45)
- Place of birth: San Félix, Venezuela
- Height: 1.75 m (5 ft 9 in)
- Position: Striker

Senior career*
Years	Team	Apps	(Gls)
2004–2005	Mineros de Guayana		
2005–2006	Carabobo		
2006–2007	Aragua		
2007–2008	Maracaibo	16	(5)
2008–2009	Monagas	42	(26)
2009–2010	Deportivo Táchira	22	(13)
2010–2011	Mineros de Guayana	28	(8)
2011–2012	Deportivo Anzoátegui	29	(9)
2012–2013	Aragua	19	(10)
2013	Atlético Huila	17	(6)
2013–2014	Deportivo Petare	31	(10)
2014–2015	Deportivo Lara	25	(6)
2015–2016	Caracas FC	32	(9)
2016	Monagas SC	20	(12)
2017–2018	Atlético Pantoja		
2019	LALA FC	36	(14)
2020	Yaracuyanos	17	(2)
2021	LALA FC	19	(4)

International career
2006–2008	Venezuela	5	(0)
- * Club domestic league appearances and goals as of 12:07, 19 July 2020 (UTC)

Armando Rafael Maita Urbáez (born 26 August 1981) is a Venezuelan international footballer as a striker.

== Club career ==
Born in San Félix, Maita has played club football for Mineros de Guayana, Carabobo, Aragua, Maracaibo, Monagas, Deportivo Táchira, Deportivo Anzoátegui, Atlético Huila and Deportivo Petare.

== International career ==
He earned five international caps for Venezuela between 2006 and 2008.
