= Atlántico FC =

Atlántico Fútbol Club
- Full name: Atlántico Futbol Club
- Nickname: La Máquina Azul
- Founded: 2015; 11 years ago
- Ground: Estadio Leonel Plácido, Puerto Plata, Dominican Republic
- Capacity: 2,000
- Chairman: Rubén D. García
- Manager: Gabriel Garcia Xatart
- League: Liga Dominicana de Fútbol
- 2025: 5th
Home colours	Away colours

Atlántico Fútbol Club is a Dominican professional football team based in Puerto Plata, Dominican Republic, founded in 2015. The team plays in the Liga Dominicana de Fútbol.

== History ==
Founder Ruben Garcia established the club in 2014 giving a perspective of football to the Puerto Plata as it is a town where the sport is not very popular. Part of the team's leaders are Arturo Heinsen, team manager, Segundo Polanco, Fernando Ortega Zeller, and his brother Gustavo Eduardo Zeller who have invested in this team in the LDF Banco Popular.

== Debut ==
The Atlantic FC debut as a visitor in the Dominican Football League on March 8, 2015, facing Club Barcelona Atlético, played at the Estadio De Fútbol Panamericano Parque Del Este, a result that ended 1–0 in favor of the locals.

== First Goal Cry of the Club ==
The first goal of the history of the Atlantic FC in the Dominican Football League was scored by the Venezuelan Jorge Marquez Gomez on March 14, 2015 in a match corresponding to the second date of the league, the goal would reach the 75th minute since The penalty point, which was successfully charged by Marquez and gave the tie to the club, the game ended with a result of 1–1 against Atletico San Cristobal FC.

Atlantico FC was the first Dominican soccer club that participated on a CFU Club Championship, on February 24, 2016, against W Connection from the TT Pro League.

== Stadium ==
- Estadio Leonel Plácido: 2015–

Leonel placido.png

== Accomplishments ==
- Liga Dominicana de Fútbol:

Champions: 2017
Runners-up: 2015

== Players ==
=== Current roster ===
Note: Flags indicate national team as defined under FIFA eligibility rules; some limited exceptions apply. Players may hold more than one non-FIFA nationality.

No.	Pos.	Nation	Player
1	GK	DOM	Andreysi Valerio
2	DF	COL	Benjamín Beltrán
3	DF	CHN	José Rivera
4	DF	COL	David Orobio
5	MF	HAI	Patrickson Nore
7	DF	COL	Santiago Gómez
8	MF	DOM	Welkin Luis
9	FW	DOM	Darly Batista
10	DF	DOM	Adrián Salcedo
11	FW	DOM	Mathews Tejeda
12	GK	COL	Juan Martínez
14	DF	DOM	Deny Louis

No.	Pos.	Nation	Player
17	FW	DOM	Ricardo Infante
18	DF	DOM	Alfeni Tamárez
19	MF	DOM	Juan de la Cruz
20	FW	DOM	Dayron Michel
25	MF	COL	Sebastian Pulido
26	MF	COL	Breinner Ruíz
27	FW	ESP	Dorkis Pérez
28	MF	DOM	Delvi Marte
29	FW	DOM	José Rubirosa
30	MF	DOM	Jesús Rosa
31	GK	DOM	Fernando López
32	FW	DOM	Judrian Reyes

=== Current staff ===
- Head Coach: Gabriel Garcia Xatart
- Sporting Director: Roberto Fernández Saralegui
- Trainer: Francisco Martinez Castro
- Physical trainer: Ariel Ventura
