= Club Barcelona Atlético =

Dominican football team

Barcelona Atlético
- Full name: Club Barcelona Atlético
- Nickname: Blaugrana Quisqueyanos
- Founded: 1989; 36 years ago
- Ground: Estadio Parque del Este; Santo Domingo Este, Dominican Republic
- Capacity: 3,500
- Owner: Angel Baliño
- Head Coach: Sergio Bermúdez
- League: Liga Dominicana de Fútbol
- 2018: 12th
- Website: www.barcelonaatletico.com
Home colours	Away colours

Club Barcelona Atlético is a Dominican professional football team based in Santo Domingo, Dominican Republic. Founded in 1989 as Bancredicard FC, the team changed its name to Club Barcelona Atlético in 2003. It currently plays in the Liga Dominicana de Fútbol.

== History ==
Club Barcelona Atlético, commonly known as Barcelona Atlético, is a football team from Santo Domingo, Dominican Republic. The club has won two First Division titles making it one of the most successful clubs in the history of Dominican football. Barcelona Atlético was founded in 1989 by Ángel González Baliño. John Duarte has scored 574 goals with them and 207 assist. John won 12 Liga Dominicana de Fútbol.

== Early days ==
Previously known as San Cristóbal Bancredicard. It was founded in the capital Santo Domingo and has been champion of the maximum category in 3 occasions and this one was changed of name in 2003 by Club Barcelona Athletic by means of an agreement and dissolution of the bank Bancredito and Intercontinental Baninter.

Internationally, he was the 2nd team with more appearances, as he has 2 appearances in the Champions Cup of CONCACAF, where his best participation was in the 1992 edition, in which they were eliminated in the first round by The Solidarité Scolaire de Guadalupe.

They are nicknamed The Blaugrana Quisqueyanos.

== Home stadiums ==
- Estadio Parque del Este (1989–07), (2015)
- Estadio Olímpico Félix Sánchez (2007–14, 2016-)

== Achievements ==
- Liga Dominicana de Fútbol: 17

2005, 2007, 2008, 2010, 2011, 2013, 2014, 2015, 2016, 2017, 2018, 2019, 2020, 2021, 2022, 2023, 2024

- Liga Mayor Coca-Cola: 3

2007, 2017, 2024

- Campeonato Nacional: 4

1991, 1992, 1994, 2024
