= 1984 in association football =

The following are the association football events of the year 1984 throughout the world.

== Events ==
- 16 May – Italian giants Juventus FC claims the European Cup Winners' Cup by defeating first-time European finalists FC Porto 2–1.
- 23 May – Tottenham Hotspur wins the UEFA Cup by defeating R.S.C. Anderlecht on penalties (4-3) after an aggregate score of 2–2 at White Hart Lane in London.
- 27 July – Copa Libertadores won by Independiente after defeating Grêmio on an aggregate score of 1–0.
- 19 September – Dutch club Fortuna Sittard makes its European debut with a draw (0-0) against Denmark's BK Copenhagen in the first round of the Cup Winners Cup.
- 9 December – Argentina's Independiente wins the Intercontinental Cup in Tokyo, Japan by defeating England's Liverpool F.C.: 1–0. The only goal is scored by José Alberto Percudani in the 6th minute.

== National Club Champions ==
=== Africa ===
- Egypt: Zamalek

=== Asia ===
- Qatar – Al-Rayyan

=== Europe ===
- Belgium – K.S.K. Beveren
- Denmark – Vejle BK
- East Germany
  - League – BFC Dynamo
  - Cup – SG Dynamo Dresden
- England
  - League – Liverpool
  - Cup – Everton
- Finland – FC Kuusysi
- France – Girondins de Bordeaux
- Italy – Juventus
- Netherlands – Feyenoord Rotterdam
- Norway – Vålerenga
- Portugal – Benfica
- Scotland – Aberdeen
- Soviet Union – FC Zenit
- Spain – Athletic Bilbao
- Sweden – IFK Göteborg
- Turkey – Trabzonspor
- West Germany – VfB Stuttgart

=== North America ===
- Mexico – Club América
- United States / Canada:
  - Chicago Sting (NASL)

=== South America ===
- Argentina
  - Metropolitano – Argentinos Juniors
  - Nacional – Ferro Carril Oeste
- Bolivia – Blooming
- Brazil – Fluminense
- Colombia – América de Cali
- Paraguay – Guaraní

== International tournaments ==
- African Cup of Nations in Ivory Coast (4–18 March 1984)
  1. Cameroon
  2. Nigeria
  3. Algeria
- 1984 British Home Championship (13 December 1983 – 25 May 1984)

Northern Ireland

- UEFA European Football Championship in France (12–27 June 1984)
  1. France
  2. Spain
  3. —
- Olympic Games in Los Angeles, United States (29 July – 11 August 1984)
  1. France
  2. Brazil
  3. Yugoslavia

== Births ==
=== January ===
- 1 January
  - Paolo Guerrero, Peruvian footballer
  - Mourad N'Zif, French former professional footballer
  - Stefano Pastrello, Italian footballer
  - Rubens Sambueza, Argentinian footballer
- 3 January – Andrei Bovtalo, former Russian footballer
- 5 January – Diego Gómez, Argentine-French footballer
- 7 January
  - Diego Balbinot, Italian-Brazilian footballer
  - Antonino Saviano, Italian footballer
- 14 January – Abdoulahy Sangaré, Mauritanian international footballer
- 16 January – Craig Beattie, Scottish footballer
- 17 January – Xavier Margairaz, Swiss footballer
- 18 January – Rubí Sandoval, Mexican female footballer
- 21 January
  - Leonardo Burián, Uruguayan youth international
  - Dejan Milovanović, Serbian footballer
  - Wes Morgan, Jamaican international
- 23 January
  - Arjen Robben, Dutch international footballer
  - Nikolay Yevgenyevich Yefimov, Russian footballer
- 24 January – Paulo Sérgio, Portuguese youth international
- 25 January – Stefan Kießling, German international footballer
- 29 January
  - Nuno Morais, Portuguese footballer
  - Safee Sali, Malaysian footballer

=== February ===
- 4 February – Waskito Sujarwoko, Indonesian footballer
- 5 February – Carlos Tevez, Argentinian international footballer
- 6 February
  - Darren Bent, English footballer
  - Fabrice Omonga, retired Belgian footballer
- 8 February – Antonino Daì, Italian footballer
- 21 February – David Odonkor, German footballer
- 27 February – Steve Warne, English footballer
- 29 February
  - Darren Ambrose, English footballer
  - Giedrius Tomkevičius, Lithuanian footballer
  - Hélio Pinto, Portuguese footballer
  - Saylee Swen, Liberian footballer
  - Ernest Bong, Vanuatuan footballer
  - Stefano Pesoli, Italian footballer

=== March ===
- 1 March – Patrick Helmes, German international footballer
- 4 March – Tamir Cohen, Israeli footballer
- 10 March
  - Derick Amadi, Nigerian professional footballer
  - Matt Lock, English footballer
- 18 March – Gary Roberts, English footballer
- 20 March – Fernando Torres, Spanish footballer
- 30 March – Gennaro Fragiello, Italian footballer

=== April ===
- 4 April – Sultan Khuranov, former Russian professional footballer
- 18 April – Raphael Ntimane, Swaziland international footballer
- 13 April – Nemanja Vuković, Montenegrin footballer
- 29 April
  - Jones Leandro, Brazilian footballer
  - Phạm Văn Quyến, Vietnamese footballer

=== May ===
- 3 May – Martin Kováč, Slovak footballer
- 4 May
  - Orkhonsaikhany Bayarjavkhlan, Mongolian international footballer
  - Daron Beneby, Bahamian international footballer
- 10 May – Jonathan Rosario, Dominican Republic international footballer
- 11 May – Andrés Iniesta, Spanish footballer
- 12 May – Yohan Congio, French footballer
- 14 May – Michael Rensing, German youth international
- 17 May – Yannick Macoa, Mauritian international footballer
- 23 May - Reinaldo Román, Paraguayan footballer
- 24 May
  - Begli Annageldiyev, Turkmen professional footballer
  - Christoph Holste, German footballer

=== June ===
- 1 June
  - Jean Beausejour, Chilean footballer
  - Jean-Claude Bozga, Romanian footballer
- 8 June – Javier Mascherano, Argentinian international
- 9 June
  - Davinson Monsalve, Colombian professional footballer
  - Wesley Sneijder, Dutch footballer
- 11 June – Vagner Love, Brazilian footballer
- 16 June – Diego Segura, Spanish former footballer
- 18 June – Jukka Veltheim, Finnish footballer
- 29 June – Ambesager Yosief, Eritrean footballer
- 30 June
  - Gabriel Badilla, Costa Rican footballer (died 2016)
  - Norismaidham Ismail, Malaysian club footballer

=== July ===
- 7 July – Mohd Shaffik Abdul Rahman, Malaysian footballer
- 9 July
  - Panda (footballer) (Márcio Gama Moreira), Brazilian footballer
- 13 July
  - Alexander Bramble, Montserratian international footballer
  - Nicola Iannotti, Italian professional footballer
- 14 July – Mounir El Hamdaoui, Dutch-born Moroccan international footballer
- 15 July – Giampietro Cicoria, Swiss professional footballer
- 16 July – Roman Markelov, former Russian professional footballer
- 18 July – Lee Barnard, English club footballer
- 21 July – Marcelo Rolón, Paraguayan footballer
- 27 July
  - Florian Bague, French former professional footballer
  - Alim Khabilov, former Russian professional footballer
- 31 July
  - Marko Balažic, Slovenian retired footballer
  - Daniel Minorelli, Brazilian footballer

=== August ===
- 1 August
  - Waso Ramadhani, Burundian footballer
  - Bastian Schweinsteiger, German footballer
- 6 August
  - Marco Airosa, Angolan footballer
  - Silva (Weliander Silva Nascimento), Brazilian footballer
- 10 August – Luca Carretto, Italian footballer
- 11 August – Georgi Aslanidi, Russian former professional footballer
- 22 August – Lee Camp, English footballer
- 23 August
  - Glen Johnson, English footballer
  - Ashley Williams, English-born Welsh international footballer

=== September ===
- 3 September – Renat Sokolov, Russian former professional footballer
- 7 September
  - Miranda, Brazilian footballer
  - Mark Veldmate, Dutch footballer
- 25 September
  - Franck Nkela, Congolese footballer
  - Mario Ruyales, Spanish footballer

=== October ===
- 1 October – Fiorenzo Chatrer, Dutch footballer
- 3 October – Anthony Le Tallec, French youth international
- 14 October – Alex Scott, English footballer
- 28 October – Jefferson Farfán, Peruvian footballer
- 31 October – Luciën Dors, Dutch footballer

=== November ===
- 3 November – Matthias Hummel, German former footballer, now assistant manager
- 8 November – Rowan Taylor, Montserrat international footballer
- 10 November
  - Jean-Martial Kipré, Ivorian footballer
  - Jarno Mattila, Finnish club footballer
- 11 November
  - Stephen Hunt, English club footballer
  - Birkir Már Sævarsson, Icelandic international
- 21 November – Bianca Weech, German footballer
- 30 November – Nigel de Jong, Dutch footballer

=== December ===
- 9 December – Winder Mendoza, Venezuelan professional footballer
- 11 December – Carlos Alberto, Brazilian footballer
- 20 December
  - Nikolaos Karabelas, Greek footballer
  - Marcel Schug, German former professional footballer

== Deaths ==
=== May ===
- 8 May – Armando Del Debbio, Brazilian left back, 8 times winner of the Campeonato Paulista with Sport Club Corinthians Paulista . (79)
- 8 May – William Ling (75), English football referee
- 11 May – Toni Turek, West-German goalkeeper, winner of the 1954 FIFA World Cup. (65)
- 12 May – Matías González, Uruguayan defender, winner of the 1950 FIFA World Cup. (58)

=== June ===
- 23 June: Horst Nemec, Austrian international footballer (born 1939)

=== July ===
- 3 July – Ernesto Mascheroni, Uruguayan defender, last surviving winner, that actually played, of the 1930 FIFA World Cup. (76)
- 7 July – Elba de Padua Lima, Brazilian footballer and manager

=== September ===
- 19 September – Álvaro Lopes Cançado, Brazilian defender, semi-finalist at the 1938 FIFA World Cup. (71)

=== October ===
- 1 October: Blagoje Marjanović, Serbian striker, semi-finalist at the 1930 FIFA World Cup.

=== December ===
- 19 December – Puck van Heel (80), Dutch footballer
