= Giampietro (given name) =

Giampietro is a given name. Notable people with the given name include:

- Giampietro Campana (1808–1880), Italian art collector
- Giampietro Cicoria (born 1984), Swiss footballer
- Giampietro Perrulli (born 1985), Italian footballer
- Giampietro Puppi (1917–2006), Italian physicist
- Giampietro Silvio (1495 – 1552), Italian painter
- Giampietro Stocco (born 1961), Italian science fiction and alternate history author
- Giampietro Zanotti (1674–1765), Italian painter and art historian

== See also ==
- Giampietro, surname
