= Dor =

DOR, Dor, or DoR may refer to:

== Computer games and characters ==
- Advance Wars: Days of Ruin, a turn-based tactics video game for the Nintendo DS
- Dor, a magician in the fictional Xanth universe; see Magicians of Xanth
- WWE Day of Reckoning, a Nintendo GameCube video game

== Geography ==
- Dör, a village in Hungary
- Dor, Iran, a village in Isfahan Province, Iran
- Dor, Israel, a moshav in northern Israel
- Ein Dor, a kibbutz in northern Israel
- Tel Dor, an archaeological site in Israel on the site of Dor or Dora, an ancient royal city of the Canaanites
- Dori Airport, an airport in Burkina Faso with the IATA code DOR
- Dorset, county in England, Chapman code

== People ==
=== Given name ===
- Dor Bahadur Bista (born ca. 1924–1926), Nepalese anthropologist, social scientist and activist
- Dor Daniel (born 1982), Israeli singer songwriter
- Dor Elo (born 1993), Israeli football player
- D'or Fischer (born 1981), American-Israeli basketball player
- Dor Guez (born ca. 1980), Israeli artist and scholar
- Dor Hugi (born 1995), Israeli football player
- Dor Malul (born 1989), Israeli football player
- Dor Micha (born 1992), Israeli football player
- Dor Peretz (born 1995), Israeli football player

=== Surname ===
- Friðrik Dór (born 1988), Icelandic R&B and pop singer and songwriter
- Georges Dor (1931–2001), Québécois author, composer, playwright, singer, poet, translator, theatrical producer and director
- Gil Dor (born 1952), Israeli guitar player
- Henri Dor (1835–1912), Swiss ophthalmologist
- Jacqueline Dor (1929–1972), French film actress
- Karin Dor (1936–2017), German actress
- Milo Dor (1923–2005), Serbian-Austrian author
- Rena Dor (1917–2000), Greek actress and a singer

=== Aliases ===
- Rod McKuen (born 1933), who used Dor as a stage name on some 1950s recordings

== Science ==
- Deadly Orgone Radiation, a theory of Wilhelm Reich
- Delta-DOR, (or Δ-DOR for short), Differential One-Way Ranging, an interplanetary radio-tracking and navigation technique
- Diagnostic odds ratio, a statistical metric
- Dorado (constellation), from its standard astronomical abbreviation
- Dor procedure, a cardiac surgery treatment for hypertrophic obstructive cardiomyopathy
- Earth-boring dung beetle, or dor beetles, of the family Geotrupidae
- Delta-opioid receptors, a receptor that has enkephalins as its endogenous ligand
- Dor, a cultivar of Karuka

== Other uses ==
- Daughters of the Revolution 1776
- Day of Remembrance (disambiguation)
- Department of Revenue (disambiguation)
- Directly Operated Railways, a holding company of the UK Department of Transport to run rail franchises that require public ownership
- Dor (political party), an Israeli pensioners' party
- D. Or. used in legal citations for United States District Court for the District of Oregon
- Dance-oriented rock or dance-rock, a genre dance-infused rock music
- Dor (film), a Hindi film directed by Nagesh Kukunoor
- Definition of ready, a term used in Agile project management

== See also ==
- Dors, a surname
- Ben-Dor, a surname
