= Sangaré =

Sangaré is a surname of Fula origin and may refer to:

- Abdoulahy Sangaré (born 1984), Mauritianian footballer
- Badra Ali Sangaré (born 1986), Ivorian footballer
- Djoumin Sangaré (born 1983), French footballer
- Drissa Sangaré (born 1987), Malian footballer
- Ibrahim Sangaré (born 1997), Ivorian footballer
- Justin Sangaré (born 1998), French Rugby League player
- Kadidia Sangaré, Malian politician
- Mamadi Sangare (born 1982), Guinean footballer
- Mamadou Blaise Sangaré (born 1954), Malian politician
- Nazim Sangaré (born 1994), Turkish footballer
- Omar Sangare (born 1970), Polish actor
- Oumou Sangaré (born 1968), Malian musician
- Sékou Sangaré (born 1974), Malian footballer
- Tiémoko Sangaré, Malian politician
