= Veltheim (disambiguation) =

Veltheim is a municipality in Germany. Veltheim may also refer to

- Veltheim (surname)
- Veltheim, Aargau, a municipality in Switzerland
- Veltheim (Winterthur), a district in Winterthur, Switzerland
