= Markelov =

Markelov (Russian: Маркелов) is a Russian masculine surname, its feminine counterpart is Markelova. It may refer to:

- Artem Markelov (born 1994), Russian racing driver
- Ivan Markelov (born 1988), Russian football player
- Leonid Markelov (born 1963), president of the Mari El republic in Russia
- Roman Markelov (born 1984), Russian football player
- Stanislav Markelov (1974–2009), Russian human rights lawyer shot dead when leaving news conference in Moscow
- Vladimir Markelov (ice hockey) (born 1987), Russian ice hockey forward
- Vladimir Markelov (gymnast) (born 1957), Russian former gymnast
