= Amadi =

Amadi may refer to:

== Places ==
- Amadi Union, union parishad in Khulna Division, Bangladesh
- Amadi, Congo, town in Bas-Uélé, Democratic Republic of the Congo
- Amedi, town in the Duhok Governorate, Kurdistan Region, Iraq
- Amadi State, former state of South Sudan

== Other uses ==
- Amadi Ikwechegh, Nigerian naval officer
- Amadi language, Ubangian language spoken in the Democratic Republic of the Congo
- Amadi (surname), Igbo-language surname
- Chronicle of Amadi, anonymous 16th-century Italian-language chronicle

== See also ==
- Mugilogobius amadi, species of fish
- Trans Amadi, neighborhood in Port Harcourt, Nigeria
