= Dors =

Dors is a surname. Notable people with the surname include:

- Diana Dors (1931–1984), English film actress and singer
- Luciën Dors (born 1984), Dutch footballer

== Others ==
- Dors Venabili, a fictional character in Isaac Asimov's Foundation Series

== See also ==
- Dor (disambiguation)
