= Rowan Taylor =

Rowan Taylor is the name of:

- Rowan Taylor (composer), American composer
- Rowan Taylor (footballer), Montserratian footballer
