= Nikolay Yefimov =

Nikolay Yefimov may refer to:

- Nikolai Yefimov (1910-1982), Soviet Russian mathematician
- Nikolay Yefimov (politician) (1932-2022), Soviet and Russian journalist and statesman
- Nikolay Yefimov (footballer) (born 1984), Russian footballer
