= Amadi (surname) =

Amadi is a common Nigerian surname of Igbo origin. In the precolonial days, it designated a man who was not of Osu caste: ama meaning "compound" and di meaning "master, lord". This is where the traditional god, Amadioha, gets his name. Notable people with this surname:

- Aaron Amadi-Holloway (born 1993), Welsh footballer
- Akarachi Etinosa Amadi (born 1994), Nigerian politician
- Andy Amadi Okoroafor (born 1966), Nigerian filmmaker
- Anne A. Amadi, Kenyan lawyer
- Bethel Nnaemeka Amadi (1964–2019), Nigerian politician
- Chinaza Amadi (born 1987), Nigerian long jumper
- Clinton Amadi (born 1971), Nigerian politician
- Dennis Oguerinwa Amadi (born 1968), Nigerian politician
- Derick Amadi (born 1984), Nigerian footballer
- Elechi Amadi (1934–2016), Nigerian author
- Ferdinand Amadi (born 1970), Central African athlete
- Ike Amadi (born 1979), Nigerian-American voice actor
- Kelechi Amadi-Obi (born 1969), Kenyan photographer and artist
- Nonso Amadi (born 1995), Nigerian singer/songwriter
- Okey Amadi, Nigerian politician
- Ronnie Amadi (born 1981), Canadian and Arena football player
- Ugo Amadi (born 1997), American football player
