= Cicoria =

Cicoria is a surname. Notable people with the surname include:

- Giampietro Cicoria (born 1984), Swiss footballer
- Tony Cicoria (born 1952), American orthopedic surgeon and pianist
