= Bague =

Bague or Bagué is a surname, and may refer to:

- Alberto Bacó Bagué, Puerto Rican lawyer
- Édouard Bague (1879–1911), French aviator
- Florian Bague (born 1984), French football goalkeeper
- Julio Bagué (born 1968), producer, arranger and music executive
- Pol Toledo Bagué (born 1994), Spanish tennis player.

== See also ==
- Ring (jewellery)
