= Carretto =

Carretto is a surname. Notable people with this surname include:

- Carlo Carretto (1910–1988), Italian religious author of the Catholic congregation of the Little Brothers of the Gospel.
- Luca Carretto (born 1984), Italian footballer

== See also ==
- Del Carretto
- Carretto Siciliano, a horse-drawn cart
