= Balažic =

Balažic is a surname. Notable people with the surname include:

- Gregor Balažic (born 1988), Slovenian footballer
- Jure Balažič (born 1980), Slovenian basketball player
- Marko Balažic (born 1984), Slovenian footballer
- Milan Balažic (born 1958), Slovenian political theorist, politician and diplomat
