= Giampietro =

Giampietro is a surname. Notable people with the surname include:

- Domenico Pellegrini Giampietro (1899–1970), Italian academic, economist, lawyer, politician and journalist
- Frank Giampietro, American poet
- Gordon P. Giampietro (born 1965), American lawyer

== See also ==
- Giampietro (given name)
