= Ben-Dor =

Ben-Dor or Ben Dor is a Hebrew surname. Notable people with the surname include:

- Gisele Ben-Dor (born 1955), American-Israeli orchestra conductor of Uruguayan origin
- Oren Ben-Dor (fl. 2000s– ), Israeli philosopher and former professor of law and philosophy
- Jan BenDor, women's rights activist from Michigan, US
- Alon Ben Dor (born 1952), Israeli former footballer

== See also ==
- Bendor (disambiguation)
- Bend Or, racehorse
