= Veltheim (surname) =

Veltheim is a German surname. Notable people with the surname include:

- August Ferdinand von Veltheim (1741–1801), German mineralogist and geologist
- Hans-Hasso von Veltheim (1885–1956), German Indologist, anthroposophist, occultist and author
- Jukka Veltheim (born 1984), Finnish football player
