= Winder Mendoza =

Dominican Republic footballer (b. 1984)

Personal information
- Full name: Winder Vladimir Mendoza Ramírez
- Date of birth: 8 December 1984 (age 41)
- Place of birth: Altagracia, Venezuela
- Height: 5 ft 6 in (1.68 m)
- Position: Right-back

Senior career*
Years	Team	Apps	(Gls)
2009–2012	Atlético Venezuela		
2012–2013	SC Guaraní		
2017–2018	Sporting Quisqueya		
2018–2019	San Francisco		
2019–2020	Cibao		
2019–2020	Delfines del Este	14	(0)
2020–2021	Moca	2	(0)
2022–2023	Atlético Vega Real	10	(1)

International career
2018–2019	Dominican Republic	1	(0)
- * Club domestic league appearances and goals

Winder Vladimir Mendoza Ramírez (born 9 December 1984) is a former footballer who played as a right-back. Born in Venezuela, he represented Dominican Republic at international level.

Mendoza spent the early part of his career in his native Venezuela playing for UCV, Yaracuyanos, Atlético Venezuela and SC Guaraní. He then emigrated to the Dominican Republic, and played for Barcelona Atlético, Inter RD and San Francisco before transferring to Cibao FC on 17 March 2019.

== International career ==
Mendoza made his professional debut for the Dominican Republic national team in a 1–0 friendly over win Guadeloupe on 15 February 2019, and scored his side's only goal.
