= Reinaldo Román =

Paraguayan footballer (born 1984)

Personal information
- Full name: Reinaldo Román Fernandez
- Date of birth: 23 May 1984 (age 42)
- Place of birth: Luque, Paraguay
- Height: 1.76 m (5 ft 9 in)
- Position: Defender

Team information
- Current team: 3 de Febrero

Senior career*
Years	Team	Apps	(Gls)
2004–2008	Sportivo Luqueño	74	(3)
2009	Guaraní	6	(0)
2010–2012	Independiente del Valle	17	(0)
2011	→ U. Católica del Quito (loan)	34	(1)
2013	Club Sport Colombia		
2014–	3 de Febrero	7	(0)

International career^{‡}
2008	Paraguay	1	(0)
- * Club domestic league appearances and goals as of 7 March 2008 ‡ National team caps and goals as of 1 June 2008

Reinaldo Román (born 23 May 1984 in Luque) is a Paraguayan footballer playing for 3 de Febrero.

He began his career at Sportivo Luqueño in 2004. Román received first cap at the friendly match against South Africa on 26 March 2008.
