= Delta-DOR =

High-precision interplanetary ranging technique

Delta-Differential One-Way Ranging (or Delta-DOR, Δ-DOR for short) is an interplanetary radio-tracking and navigation technique.

== Procedure ==
As with standard DOR (Differential One-Way Ranging), radio signals from a given spacecraft are received by two widely separated deep space ground stations on Earth and the difference in the times of signal arrival is precisely measured and used to calculate a bearing, while the Doppler shift is used to calculate the velocity of the spacecraft. Due to Earth's atmosphere altering the speed and frequency of the incoming transmission, some error is generated. This error is corrected using information about the current delays and signal variance due to Earth's atmosphere, obtained by simultaneously tracking radio signals from a well known quasar (preferably within 10 degrees of the spacecraft from the station's perspective) from each ground location and calculating the difference between the expected values and actual values, thus gaining the ability to determine accurate atmospheric delay live from both sites. This method is somewhat similar to the laser beacons used on optical telescopes such as the Extremely Large Telescope to actively adjust for the distortion caused by the atmosphere.

== Missions using Delta-DOR ==
Delta-DOR navigation has been and is used by interplanetary missions of various nations and aerospace organizations, such as NASA's Deep Space Network, ESA's ESA Deep Space Network, CNSA's Chinese Deep Space Network, and ISRO's Indian Deep Space Network, among others, where it is a part of "tracking coverage," a navigational aid including Doppler, ranging, and Delta-DOR. Missions that have or actively do use it include:

ESA used a Delta-DOR system for Venus Express' orbit insertion in April 2006 and to Rosetta's Mars swingby in February 2007. The technique was also used in guiding the ExoMars Trace Gas Orbiter during its cruise phase in 2016.

CNSA is using Delta-DOR technique for Chang'e series lunar spacecraft tracking

ISRO is using Delta-DOR for the Mars Orbiter Mission (MOM).

ESA is using Delta-DOR for the ExoMars Trace Gas Orbiter (TGO).
