= Henri Dor =

Swiss ophtalmologist (1835–1912)

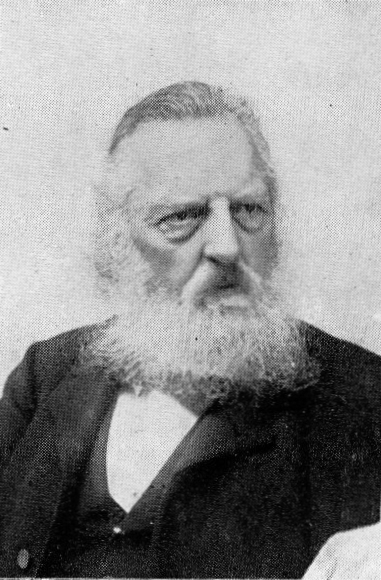
Henri Dor

Henri Dor (4 October 1835, in Vevey – 28 October 1912, in Lyon) was a Swiss ophthalmologist.

He studied medicine at the University of Zürich, then furthered his education in ophthalmology at Vienna, Berlin, Paris, London, Edinburgh and Utrecht. From 1860 he worked as an ophthalmologist in this hometown of Vevey, then in 1867 was named a professor of ophthalmology at the University of Bern. In 1876 he resigned his professorship and opened a private clinic in Lyon.

With Edouard Meyer he founded the journal Revue générale d'Ophtamologie. He was also a founder of the Société d'Ophtalmologie de Heidelberg. In 1881 he became a member of the Société d'anthropologie de Lyon, serving as its president in 1898 and 1909. He was the author of numerous articles on clinical ophthalmology and on the physiology of vision. He was fluent in several languages, including Esperanto. In 1908 he was chosen as the first president of the Tutmonda Esperantista Kuracista Asocio (World Esperanto Medical Association).

== Selected works ==
- Des différences individuelles de la réfraction de l'oeil, 1860 – Individual differences involving refraction of the eye.
- De la vision chez les arthropodes, 1861 – The vision of arthropods.
- Das Stereoscop : und das Stereoscopische Sehen, 1871 – The stereoscope and stereoscopic vision.
- Échelle pour mesurer l'acuité de la vision chromatique, 1878 – Scale to measure the acuity of chromatic vision.
- Revue critique de la doctrine : sur le centre cortical de la vision (by Salomon Eberhard Henschen, translated from Swedish to French by Henri Dor; 1900) – Critical revision of the doctrine on the cortical center of vision.
