= Matt Lock =

English footballer

Personal information
- Full name: Matthew John Lock
- Date of birth: 10 March 1984 (age 42)
- Place of birth: Barnstaple, England
- Position: Midfielder

Team information
- Current team: Canvey Island

Youth career
- Exeter City

Senior career*
Years	Team	Apps	(Gls)
2002–2003	Exeter City	3	(0)
2003–2004	Team Bath		
2004–2005	Tiverton Town		
- → Mansgotfield United (loan)
2005–2006	Team Bath		
- Mansgotfield United
- Team Bath
2009–2011	Chelmsford City	66	(8)
2011–2012	Gloucester City	34	(2)
2011	→ Cirencester Town (loan)	2	(1)
2012–2013	Bunbury Forum Force		
2013–2014	Chelmsford City	29	(1)
2014	Dover Athletic	13	(0)
2015–2018	Maldon & Tiptree	82	(7)
2019	Bowers & Pitsea	5	(1)
2019	Coggeshall Town	7	(0)
2019–	Canvey Island	5	(0)

Managerial career
- 2013: Bunbury Forum Force
- * Club domestic league appearances and goals as of 23:03, 11 December 2019 (UTC)

Matthew John Lock (born 10 March 1984) is an English footballer who plays as a midfielder for Canvey Island.

== Career ==
Lock began his senior career at Exeter City, after coming through the club's youth academy. On 12 October 2002, Lock made his debut for the club in a 1–1 home draw against Rushden & Diamonds. Lock was released from Exeter at the end of the season, having made three Football League appearances. Following a period coaching in the United States, Lock played for non-league clubs Team Bath, Tiverton Town and Mansgotfield United. At Team Bath, Lock made over 100 appearances.

In 2009, Lock signed for Chelmsford City, making 87 appearances for the club in all competitions over the course of two seasons. In the summer of 2011, Lock joined Gloucester City, playing for the club 39 times. In June 2012, Australian club Bunbury Forum Force signed Lock. During his time at Bunbury Forum Force, Lock also took up the position of manager. During the 2013–14 season, Lock rejoined Chelmsford. The following season, Lock signed for Dover Athletic, making 13 league appearances. In July 2015, Lock signed for Maldon & Tiptree. During his time at the club, Lock made 99 appearances in all competitions before retiring on 3 January 2018.

In March 2019, Lock came out of retirement to sign for Bowers & Pitsea. On 14 June 2019, Coggeshall Town announced the signing of Lock in a player-coach role. In October 2019, Lock signed for Canvey Island in a player-coach capacity. On 8 August 2022 Worcester City Women announced the appointment of Matt Lock as First Team Manager.
