= Leones De Alma Rosa FC =

Leones De Alma Rosa
- Full name: Leones De Alma Rosa Football Club
- Nickname(s): La Fiera
- Founded: 1990
- Ground: Estadio Parque del Este; Santo Domingo, Dominican Republic
- Capacity: 4,000
- Owner: Jorge Gomez De Leon
- Coach: Jorge Gomez De Leon
- League: Primera División de Republica Dominicana
Home colours	Away colours

Leones De Alma Rosa FC Is a football team based in Santo Domingo, Dominican Republic. Founded in 1990, the team participated in the last tournament of the First Division of the Dominican Republic.
