= Alexander Bramble =

Montserratian footballer

Personal information
- Date of birth: 13 July 1984 (age 42)
- Position: Midfielder

International career^{‡}
Years	Team	Apps	(Gls)
2008–2012	Montserrat	5	(0)
- ‡ National team caps and goals as of 26 June 2011

Alexander Bramble (born 13 July 1984) is a Montserratian international footballer who plays as a midfielder.

== Career ==
Bramble made his international debut for Montserrat on 26 March 2008, in a FIFA World Cup qualifier. He has five caps to date, all of which came in FIFA World Cup qualifying matches.
