= Gennaro Fragiello =

Italian professional football player

Personal information
- Date of birth: 30 March 1984 (age 42)
- Place of birth: Naples, Italy
- Height: 1.90 m (6 ft 3 in)
- Position: Striker

Senior career*
| Years | Team | Apps | (Gls) |
| 2000–2006 | Bologna | 2 | (0) |
| 2001–2002 | → Fiorenzuola (loan) | 3 | (0) |
| 2002–2003 | → Fanfulla (loan) | 17 | (3) |
| 2005 | → Carpenedolo (loan) | 10 | (3) |
| 2005–2006 | → Sassuolo (loan) | 23 | (2) |
| 2006–2007 | Sambenedettese | 14 | (2) |
| 2007–2008 | Sorrento | 25 | (4) |
| 2008–2009 | Cassino | 11 | (0) |
| 2009 | Salernitana | 3 | (0) |
| 2009–2010 | Como | 17 | (0) |
| 2020-2021 | SAVIANO | | (2) |
- * Club domestic league appearances and goals

Gennaro Fragiello (born March 30, 1984, in Naples) is an Italian professional football player.

He played two games in two seasons in the Serie A for Bologna F.C. 1909.

== See also ==
- Football in Italy
- List of football clubs in Italy
