= Kadidia Sangaré =

Malian politician(born 1962)

Kadidia Sangaré Coulibaly (born 3 May 1962) is a Malian lawyer and politician.

She was appointed president of Mali's National Commission on Human Rights (Commission Nationale des Droits de l'Homme (CNDH)) in 2017.

She was appointed Minister for Human Rights in 2018.

She was elected to the National Assembly for the constituency of San in the 2020 Malian parliamentary election, but the parliament was dissolved after the 2020 Malian coup d'état in August 2020.

She is an officer of the National Order of Mali.
