= Marcelo Rolón =

Paraguayan footballer (born 1984)

Marcelo Daniel Rolón Figueredo (born 21 July 1984 in Asunción, Paraguay) is a Paraguayan naturalized Chilean former footballer who played as a midfielder.

== Teams ==
- (Paraguay) Victoria 2001–2002
- (Paraguay) Sol de América 2003
- (Chile) Palestino 2004
- (Chile) Fernández Vial 2005
- (Chile) Magallanes 2006
- (Chile) Deportes Temuco 2007
- (Chile) Deportes Copiapó 2008
- (Chile) Municipal Iquique 2009
- (Chile) Rangers 2010
- (Paraguay) Independiente Campo Grande 2011
