= Franck Nkela =

Belgian-Congolese footballer

Personal information
- Full name: Guélor Franck Nkela Nkatu
- Date of birth: 25 September 1984 (age 42)
- Place of birth: Brussels, Belgium
- Height: 1.91 m (6 ft 3 in)
- Position: Goalkeeper

Team information
- Current team: Sint-Niklaas

Senior career*
Years	Team	Apps	(Gls)
200?–2006	Cilu		
2006–2007	Visé		
2007–2008	Lombeek-Ternat		
2008–2009	Mons	2	(0)
2009–2011	Tubize	3	(0)
2013–2014	Turnhout		
2014–2016	Beerschot Wilrijk		
2017–2018	Vita Club		
2018–2021	Wallonia Walhain		
2021–	Sint-Niklaas		

International career
2004–2015	DR Congo	6	(0)
- * Club domestic league appearances and goals

Guélor Franck Nkela Nkatu (born 25 September 1984) is a Congolese footballer who plays as a goalkeeper.

== Career ==
Nkela made two appearances in the Belgian First Division during the 2008–09 season for Mons.

In 2021, Nkela moved to Sint-Niklaas after having played a couple of seasons for Wallonia Walhain.
