= Mourad N'Zif =

French footballer (born 1984)

Personal information
- Date of birth: 1 January 1984 (age 42)
- Place of birth: Domont, France
- Height: 1.75 m (5 ft 9 in)
- Position: Midfielder

Senior career*
Years	Team	Apps	(Gls)
2002–2004	Le Mans	0	(0)
2004–2007	Pau	93	(9)
2007–2008	Stade Laval	33	(4)
2008–2009	Beauvais	35	(4)
2009	Tubize	12	(1)
2010–2011	Pau	27	(1)
2011–2012	Orléans	16	(1)
2012–2013	Red Star	17	(1)
2013–2015	Tarbes Pyrénées	19	(1)
2015–2020	Aviron Bayonnais	89	(4)
Total		341	(26)
- * Club domestic league appearances and goals

Mourad N'Zif (born 1 January 1984) is a French former professional footballer who played as a midfielder.

== Career ==
N'Zif started his career with Le Mans, but did not make a first-team appearance for the club. In the summer of 2004, he signed for Championnat National side Pau FC on a free transfer. He spent three seasons with Pau and scored a total of nine goals in 93 league games. N'Zif joined Stade Lavallois in 2007 and scored his first goal for the club in the 4–0 win away at FC Istres in the first round of the Coupe de la Ligue. He played for AS Beauvais Oise during the 2008–09 season, making 35 league appearances for the side. He left Beauvais in the summer of 2009, and later had a spell in the Belgian Second Division with A.F.C. Tubize. He scored one goal in 12 matches for Tubize, but was released in December 2009, and returned to Pau on 9 July 2010.

== Personal life ==
Born in France, N'Zif is of Moroccan descent.
