= Nicola Iannotti =

Italian footballer

Personal information
- Full name: Nicola Iannotti
- Date of birth: 13 July 1984 (age 42)
- Place of birth: Carignano, Italy
- Height: 1.72 m (5 ft 8 in)
- Position: Midfielder

Senior career*
Years	Team	Apps	(Gls)
2001–2002	Benevento		
2002–2004	Livorno	4	(0)
2004–2005	Rosetana	23	(0)
2005–2006	Sangiovannese	0	(0)
2006	Novara	1	(0)
2006–2007	Livorno	0	(0)
2011–	Aylesbury F.C.		
- * Club domestic league appearances and goals

Nicola Iannotti (born 13 July 1984) is an Italian professional footballer who plays as a midfielder for A.S.D Virtus Liburia.
