= Begli Annageldiyev =

Turkmenistan footballer

Personal information
- Full name: Begli Hudaýgeldiýewiç Annageldiýew
- Date of birth: 24 May 1984 (age 42)
- Position: Defender

Senior career*
Years	Team	Apps	(Gls)
2005–2008	HTTU Aşgabat		
2009	Aşgabat FK		
2010–2014	HTTU Aşgabat		
2015	Hazyna Aşgabat		
2016	Ýedigen Aşgabat		

International career
2007–2011	Turkmenistan	26	(0)
Medal record
First place	Ýokary Liga	2005
First place	Turkmenistan Super Cup	2005
First place	Ýokary Liga	2006
First place	Turkmenistan Cup	2006
First place	Turkmenistan Super Cup	2006
Second place	Turkmenistan President's Cup	2006
Second place	Ýokary Liga	2007
First place	Turkmenistan President's Cup	2007
Second place	Ýokary Liga	2008
Second place	Turkmenistan Cup	2006
First place	Turkmenistan President's Cup	2008
First place	Ýokary Liga	2009
First place	Turkmenistan Super Cup	2009
First place	Turkmenistan President's Cup	2009
Second place	Ýokary Liga	2011
First place	Turkmenistan Cup	2011
Second place	Turkmenistan Super Cup	2012
First place	Turkmenistan Super Cup	2012
First place	Ýokary Liga	2013
- * Club domestic league appearances and goals

Begli Annageldiyev (born 24 May 1984) is a Turkmen professional footballer. He last played for HTTU Asgabat as a defender. He was the 2007 Turkmenistan Player of the Year and was called up for his country's FIFA World Cup 2010 qualifying campaign.
