= Orkhonsaikhany Bayarjavkhlan =

Mongolian footballer

Personal information
- Full name: Orkhonsaikhany Bayarjavkhlan; Орхонсаиханы Баяржавхлан
- Date of birth: May 4, 1984 (age 42)
- Place of birth: Mongolia
- Position: Midfielder

Team information
- Current team: Ulaanbaataryn Mazaalaynuud

Senior career*
Years	Team	Apps	(Gls)
2003–	Ulaanbaataryn Mazaalaynuud	12	(0)

International career
2005–	Mongolia	2	(0)
- * Club domestic league appearances and goals

Orkhonsaikhany Bayarjavkhlan (Mongolian: Орхонсаиханы Баяржавхлан; born 4 May 1984) is a Mongolian international footballer. He has appeared twice for the Mongolia national football team.
