= Davinson Monsalve =

Colombian footballer (born 1984)

Personal information
- Full name: Davinson Alexi Monsalve Jiménez
- Date of birth: 9 June 1984 (age 42)
- Place of birth: El Bagre, Colombia
- Height: 1.87 m (6 ft 2 in)
- Position: Centre back

Senior career*
Years	Team	Apps	(Gls)
2005–2008	Atlético Nacional		
2006	→ Alianza Petrolera (loan)		
2007	→ Bello (loan)		
2008–2016	Deportes Tolima	189	(13)
2016	Atlético Huila	13	(0)
2017	Atlético Bucaramanga	9	(0)
2017	Once Caldas	16	(1)
2018–2019	Patriotas	28	(1)
- * Club domestic league appearances and goals as of 17:23, 27 July 2019 (UTC)

Davinson Monsalve (born 9 June 1984) is a Colombian professional footballer who most recently played as a centre back for Patriotas Boyacá.

== Honours ==
Deportes Tolima

- Copa Colombia (1): 2014
