= Yannick Macoa =

Mauritian footballer

Personal information
- Full name: Yannick Macoa
- Date of birth: 17 May 1984 (age 42)
- Place of birth: Mauritius
- Position: Goalkeeper

Senior career*
Years	Team	Apps	(Gls)
2004–2007	Pointe-aux-Sables Mates	?	(?)
2007–2010	AS Port-Louis 2000	?	(?)
2011–2012	Pointe-aux-Sables Mates	?	(?)
2012–2013	Curepipe Starlight SC	?	(?)
2013–	Pointe-aux-Sables Mates	?	(?)

International career
2005–2010	Mauritius	12	(0)
- * Club domestic league appearances and goals

Yannick Macoa (born May 17, 1984) is a Mauritian international footballer who plays as a goalkeeper for Pointe-aux-Sables Mates. As of May 2011, he has won 12 caps for the Mauritius national football team.

== Career statistics ==
=== International ===
Appearances and goals by national team and year
National team	Year	Apps	Goals
Mauritius	2005	2	0
Mauritius	2006	–	
Mauritius	2007	9	0
Mauritius	2008	–	
Mauritius	2009	–	
Mauritius	2010	1	0
Total		12	0
