= Martin Kováč =

Slovak footballer

Personal information
- Full name: Martin Kováč
- Date of birth: 3 May 1984 (age 42)
- Place of birth: Košice, Czechoslovakia
- Height: 1.90 m (6 ft 3 in)
- Position: Centre back

Youth career
- Lokomotíva Košice

Senior career*
Years	Team	Apps	(Gls)
- Lokomotíva Košice
?–2008	MFK Košice B		
2008–2009	→Dunajská Streda (loan)	7	(1)
2009–2011	FK Bodva	?	(4)
- * Club domestic league appearances and goals as of 21 July 2011

Martin Kováč (born 3 May 1984 in Košice) is a Slovak football defender who recently played for the 1. liga club FK Bodva Moldava nad Bodvou.
