= Georgi Aslanidi =

Russian professional footballer

Personal information
- Full name: Georgi Georgiyevich Aslanidi
- Date of birth: August 11, 1984 (age 42)
- Place of birth: Ordzhonikidze, Russian SFSR
- Height: 1.76 m (5 ft 9 in)
- Position: Midfielder

Youth career
- FC Alania Vladikavkaz

Senior career*
Years	Team	Apps	(Gls)
2001–2002	FC Alania Vladikavkaz	0	(0)
2003–2005	FC Rostov	12	(1)
2006–2007	FC SKA Rostov-on-Don	37	(1)
2008	FC Zvezda Irkutsk	14	(0)
2009	FC SKA Rostov-on-Don	18	(0)
2009	FC Torpedo Armavir	9	(0)
2011	FC Alania-d Vladikavkaz	7	(0)
2011–2013	FC Slavyansky Slavyansk-na-Kubani	42	(4)
2013–2015	FC Vityaz Krymsk	40	(3)
- * Club domestic league appearances and goals

Georgi Georgiyevich Aslanidi (Russian: Георгий Георгиевич Асланиди; born 11 August 1984) is a Russian former professional footballer.

== Club career ==
He made his debut in the Russian Premier League in 2004 for FC Rostov.
