= Waso Ramadhani =

Burundian footballer

Personal information
- Date of birth: August 1, 1984
- Place of birth: Bujumbura, Burundi
- Date of death: March 26, 2024 (aged 39)
- Place of death: Burundi
- Position: Defender

Senior career*
| Years | Team | Apps | (Gls) |
| 2004–2006 | Young Africans FC | | |
| 2007– | Simba SC | | |

International career^{‡}
| 2002–2007 | Burundi | 12 | (0) |
- * Club domestic league appearances and goals as of 9 November 2007 ‡ National team caps and goals as of 9 November 2007

Waso Ramadhani (1 August 1984 – 26 March 2024), also known as Ramadhani Waso or Wasso, was a Burundian defender who played with Simba SC in the Tanzanian Premier League.

He played 4 years in the Tanzanian Premier League, first by Young Africans FC and now by Simba SC. He represented his homeland at international level between 2002 and 2007.

He died on 25 March 2024 in Burundi.
