= Clinton Amadi =

Nigerian politician

State Representative
- Constituency: Owerri Municipal

Personal details
- Born: 1971 (age 54–55)
- Party: Labour Party (Nigeria)
- Occupation: Politician

Clinton Christopher Nkemjika Amadi is a Nigerian politician and a lawmaker. He currently serves as a member of the Imo State House of Assembly representing Owerri Municipal under the platform of Labour Party.

== Early life ==
Clinton hails from Owerri Nshise. He was born in 1971 in the family of Benard Clinton Amadi. He began his elementary school at Township Primary School in Owerri before moving to Zumuratul Islamia Primary School in Lagos. He later attended Niger School of Commerce and Institute of Management and Technology.

== Political career ==
Amadi was elected as a member of the Imo State House of Assembly from 2007 to 2011. In 2023, Amadi again contested in the Imo State House of Assembly election but he was not declared winner. He later went to the tribunal, and he was declared victorious.
