= Day of Remembrance =

Day of Remembrance may refer to the following:

- Commemoration Day of Fallen Soldiers (third Sunday of May), a commemorative day observed by Finland
- International Holocaust Remembrance Day (27 January), an international memorial day that commemorates the victims of the Holocaust
- Day of Remembrance (31 January), a commemorative day observed by NASA commemorating the loss of those in the Columbia, Challenger, and Apollo 1 incidents
- Day of Remembrance (Japanese Americans) (19 February), day commemorating the Japanese American internment during World War II
- Day of Remembrance for Truth and Justice (24 March), a commemorative day observed by Argentina
- Remembrance of the Dead (4 May), a commemorative day observed in the Netherlands commemorating the war victims of conflicts since World War II
- National Day of Remembrance (Cambodia) (20 May), a commemorative day observed in Cambodia
- National Day of Remembrance of the victims of the Genocide of the Citizens of the Polish Republic committed by Ukrainian Nationalists (11 July)
- Remembrance Day (Azerbaijan) (27 September), a commemorative day observed in Azerbaijan
- Day of Remembrance (Turkmenistan) (6 October), day commemorating the 1948 Ashgabat earthquake
- Day of Remembrance of the Victims of Political Repressions (30 October), a commemorative day observed by former Soviet countries
- Remembrance Day (11 November), a commemorative day observed by many Commonwealth countries
- Remembrance Day (Hong Kong) (2nd Sunday of November), a day celebrating the end of World War I, World War II, and commemorating the lives lost in the Battle of Hong Kong.
- Remembrance Sunday (2nd Sunday of November), this is held in the United Kingdom as a day to commemorate the contribution of British and Commonwealth military and civilian servicemen and women in the two World Wars and later conflicts
- Transgender Day of Remembrance (20 November), a commemorative day observed by the LGBT community
- Yom Hazikaron (4 Iyar), a commemorative day observed by Israel
- In Thomas Hardy's Wessex novels, Remembrance Day is the term for Encaenia

== See also ==
- Days of Remembrance
- Memorial Day
- Remembrance (disambiguation)
