= Giampietro Silvio =

Italian painter

- Born: 1495; Venice
- Died: 1552 (aged 56–57); Venice

Giampietro Silvio or Giampietro di Marco di Francesco Silvio (1495 – 1552) was an Italian painter.

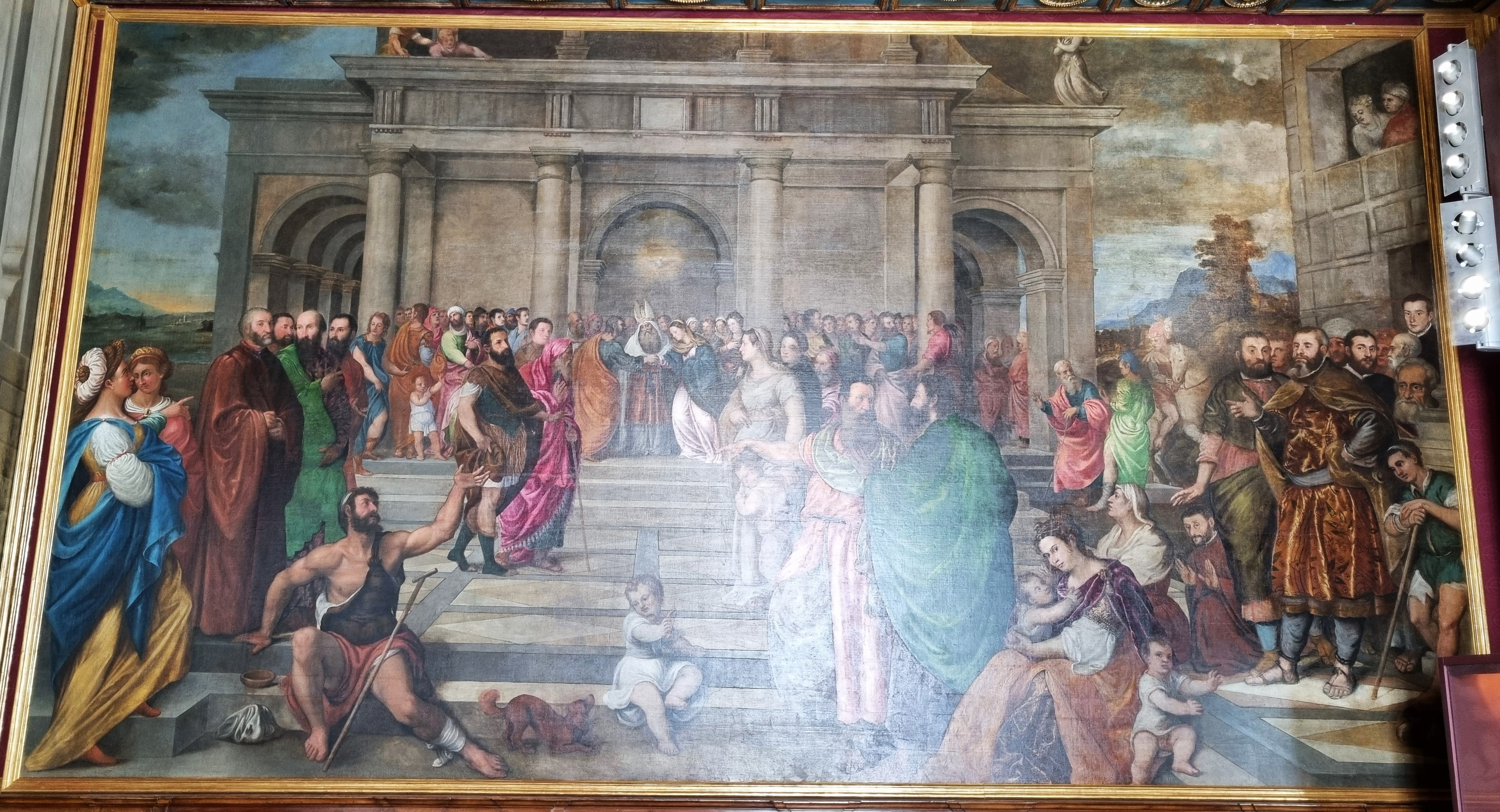
The Marriage of the Virgin in the Sala dell'Albergo, Accademia, Venice

Silvio was born in Venice and though it hasn't been proven that he was a pupil, he was familiar with the studio of Titian because his paintings are in his style. He is known for portraits and wall decorations, most notably The Marriage of the Virgin with members of the Scuola Grande della Carità in the Sala dell'Albergo in the Gallerie dell'Accademia which he created together with Domenico Tintoretto in 1538–1543. In the same room, Titian painted his masterpiece The Presentation of the Virgin at the Temple.

Silvio died in Venice.
