= Matthias Hummel =

German footballer and manager

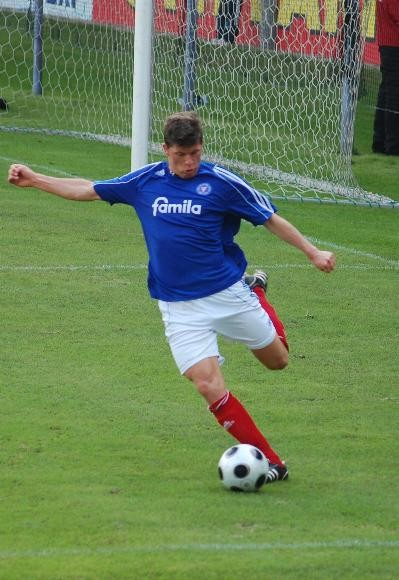
- Hummel with Holstein Kiel

Personal information
- Full name: Matthias Hummel
- Date of birth: 3 November 1984 (age 42)
- Place of birth: Troisdorf, West Germany
- Height: 1.83 m (6 ft 0 in)
- Position: Centre-back

Team information
- Current team: TSV Bordesholm (assistant)

Youth career
- –1999: TSV Russee
- 1999–2003: Holstein Kiel

Senior career*
Years	Team	Apps	(Gls)
2003–2010	Holstein Kiel II	131	(15)
2004–2010	Holstein Kiel	66	(2)
2010–2011	FC Sylt	34	(0)
2011–2016	ETSV Weiche Flensburg	130	(8)

International career
2017–	TSV Bordesholm (assistant)		
- * Club domestic league appearances and goals

Matthias Hummel (born 3 November 1984) is a German former footballer who played as a centre-back, and current assistant manager of TSV Bordesholm.

== Career ==
Hummel made his professional debut in the 3. Liga for Holstein Kiel on 2 October 2009, coming on as a substitute in the 70th minute for Kevin Schulz in the 2–0 home win against VfB Stuttgart II.

After retiring from playing football in 2016, Hummel became the technical director of ETSV Weiche Flensburg. In 2017, he was appointed as the assistant manager of TSV Bordesholm.
