= Diego Segura =

Spanish footballer (born 1984)

Personal information
- Full name: Diego Segura Ramírez
- Date of birth: 16 June 1984 (age 42)
- Place of birth: Seville, Spain
- Height: 1.77 m (5 ft 9 1/2 in)
- Position: Forward

Youth career
- Betis

Senior career*
| Years | Team | Apps | (Gls) |
| 2003–2009 | Betis B | 145 | (33) |
| 2008 | Betis | 3 | (0) |
| 2009–2010 | Alavés | 24 | (2) |
| 2010–2011 | Jaén | 35 | (5) |
| 2011–2012 | Ceuta | 31 | (5) |
| 2012–2014 | Cartagena | 59 | (1) |
| 2014–2015 | Marbella | 34 | (7) |
| 2015–2016 | Alcalá | 31 | (4) |
| Total | | 362 | (57) |
- * Club domestic league appearances and goals

Diego Segura Ramírez (born 16 June 1984) is a Spanish former professional footballer who played as a forward.

== Club career ==
Segura was born in Seville, Andalusia. A product of hometown club Real Betis' youth ranks, he first appeared with the first team in La Liga during the 2008–09 season, in three consecutive matches in late November/early December due to injuries to teammates. He made his debut by playing the last five minutes in a 3–2 away loss against Valencia CF, going on to total six games in all competitions.

In the summer of 2009, Segura was released following Betis' relegation and signed a two-year contract with Deportivo Alavés of Segunda División B. He changed clubs again on 15 July 2010, joining Real Jaén also in the third tier as a free agent.
