= Jonathan Rosario =

Dominican footballer (born 1984)

Personal information
- Full name: Jobwin Jhonatan Rosario Muñoz
- Date of birth: May 10, 1984 (age 42)
- Place of birth: Moca, Dominican Republic
- Position: Midfielder

Team information
- Current team: Moca FC
- Number: 7

Senior career*
Years	Team	Apps	(Gls)
2005–2007	Moca FC		
2007–2009	Bauger FC		
2013–	Moca FC		

International career
2010–	Dominican Republic	2	
- * Club domestic league appearances and goals

Jobwin Jhonatan Rosario Muñoz, nicknamed Bimbo (born 10 May 1984), is a Dominican Republic international football midfielder who plays for Moca FC in the Dominican Republic First Division
