= Steve Warne =

English footballer (born 1984)

Personal information
- Full name: Stephen James Warne
- Date of birth: 27 February 1984 (age 42)
- Place of birth: Sutton-in-Ashfield, England
- Position: Midfielder

Team information
- Current team: Handsworth Parramore

Youth career
- 2001–2002: Chesterfield

Senior career*
Years	Team	Apps	(Gls)
2002–2004	Chesterfield	4	(0)
2003	→ Worksop Town (loan)		
2004	→ Matlock Town (loan)		
2004	Hucknall Town		
2004–2007	Matlock Town		
2007–2008	Alfreton Town		
2008–2012	Matlock Town		
2011	→ Belper Town (loan)		
2012–2015	Belper Town		
2015–2018	Handsworth Parramore		
- * Club domestic league appearances and goals

Stephen James "Steve" Warne (born 27 February 1984 in Sutton-in-Ashfield) is an English footballer who played as a midfielder in the Football League for Chesterfield. He finished his career at Handsworth Parramore and is now retired.

== Career ==
Warne began his career as a trainee with Chesterfield in 2001. He made four first-team appearances in the 2002–03 campaign, and was given a professional contract in July 2003. Naturally right footed and operating mainly in the centre of midfield Warne has the ability to play across the midfield in a variety of positions and has been a regular and success at all the clubs he has played for.

Warne made his professional debut for Chesterfield in the football league trophy against Port Vale on 12 November 2002 and went on to make 3 more appearances that year against Barnsley, Swindon and Wigan. Due to changes in the management in following seasons Warne was struggling to find opportunities for playing time and after spells on loan with Worksop Town and Matlock Town, he was released by Chesterfield at the end of the 2003–04 season and joined Conference North club Hucknall Town.

Released two months later, he signed for Matlock Town for the second time. In October 2007, Warne moved on to Conference North side Alfreton Town, but failed to settle and returned to Matlock at the end of the season.

Warne eventually moved to Belper Town permanently in 2012 after being on loan with them for a brief spell in the 2011 season and helped the club to promotion to the Northern Premier League in the 2013–14 season through the play-offs. He joined Handsworth Parramore in July 2015.
