= Daniel Minorelli =

Brazilian footballer (born 1984)

Personal information
- Full name: Daniel Pedro Minorelli
- Date of birth: 31 July 1984 (age 42)
- Place of birth: Bahia, Brazil
- Height: 1.74 m (5 ft 8 1/2 in)
- Position: Defensive midfielder

Youth career
- 1996–1999: Santos

Senior career*
Years	Team	Apps	(Gls)
1999–2005	Torino	18	(2)
2005–2007	Martina	15	(8)
2007–2009	Ivrea	30	(2)
2009–2010	Cuneo	17	(7)
2010–2012	SpVgg Unterhaching	16	
2012	ABC	20	
- * Club domestic league appearances and goals

Daniel Pedro Minorelli (born 31 July 1984) is a Brazilian footballer.
