= Yohan Congio =

French footballer (born 1984)

Personal information
- Full name: Yohan Congio
- Date of birth: May 12, 1984 (age 42)
- Place of birth: Lunel, France
- Height: 1.82 m (6 ft 0 in)
- Position: Defender

Team information
- Current team: Bergerac Foot
- Number: 4

Senior career*
Years	Team	Apps	(Gls)
2001–2004	Montpellier	0	(0)
2004–2007	Sètè	65	(3)
2007–2009	Calais	45	(2)
2009–2011	Bergerac Foot		
2011	US Quevilly-Rouen	8	(0)
2011-2013	Rodez AF	60	(5)
2013-2014	FC Martigues	13	(0)
- * Club domestic league appearances and goals

Yohan Congio (born May 12, 1984) is a French footballer, who is currently playing for Bergerac Foot.

== Career ==
Congio previously played for FC Sète in Ligue 2 and Championnat National side Calais for two years each. He also played in 4 CFA clubs between 2010/2011 to 2013/2014.. (Note: Yohan Congio – French league stats at LFP – also available in French (archived))
