= Giampietro Stocco =

Italian writer and journalist

Giampietro Stocco (born 1961) is an Italian science fiction and alternate history author.

Stocco was born in Rome. He got graduated from with a degree in Political Sciences at the Università di Roma "La Sapienza" with a thesis about the national and ethnic minorities in Europe, with a special focus on the cases of South Tyrol and Schleswig-Holstein. He studied for a master's degree in contemporary history in Denmark, Odense University, at Roskilde Universitetscenter and Institute of regional Studies in Aabenraa. He lives and works in Genoa, as a journalist in RAI, the Italian public TV-service.

== Bibliography ==
- Nero Italiano (novel, Fratelli Frilli Editori, 2003)
- Dea del Caos (novel, Fratelli Frilli Editori, 2005)
- Figlio della Schiera (novel, Chinaski, 2007)
- Dalle mie ceneri (novel, Delos Books, 2008)
- Nuovo Mondo (novel, Bietti Edizioni, 2010)
- Dolly (novel, Zerounoundici Edizioni, 2012)
- La corona perduta (novel, Cordero Editore, 2013)
