= Bianca Weech =

German footballer

Personal information
- Full name: Bianca Weech
- Date of birth: 21 November 1984 (age 41)
- Place of birth: Henstedt-Ulzburg, Germany
- Height: 1.70 m (5 ft 7 in)
- Position: Goalkeeper

Senior career*
Years	Team	Apps	(Gls)
2003–	Hamburger SV	148	
- * Club domestic league appearances and goals

Bianca Weech is a German football goalkeeper, currently playing for Hamburger SV in the Frauen Bundesliga.
