= Marcel Schug =

German footballer

Personal information
- Date of birth: 20 December 1984 (age 41)
- Place of birth: Bad Kreuznach, West Germany
- Height: 1.85 m (6 ft 1 in)
- Position: Attacking midfielder

Youth career
- –2005: Hassia Bingen

Senior career*
Years	Team	Apps	(Gls)
2005–2007	SC Freiburg II		
2007–2011	1. FC Saarbrücken	67	(11)
2011–2014	SV Elversberg	68	(8)
2011–2014	Saar 05 Saarbrücken	37	(8)
- * Club domestic league appearances and goals

Marcel Schug (born 20 December 1984) is a German former professional footballer who played as an attacking midfielder in the 3. Liga for 1. FC Saarbrücken and SV Elversberg.
