= Raphael Ntimane =

Swazi footballer

Personal information
- Full name: Raphael Sikhumbuzo Ntimane
- Date of birth: 18 April 1984 (age 42)
- Place of birth: Swaziland
- Position: Defender

Senior career*
| Years | Team | Apps | (Gls) |
| 2004–2014 | Malanti Chiefs F.C. | | |
| 2014–2023 | Royal Leopards F.C. | | |

International career
| 2008–2009 | Swaziland | 11 | (0) |
- * Club domestic league appearances and goals

Raphael Sikhumbuzo Ntimane (born 18 April 1984) is an Eswatini former footballer who played as a defender for Malanti Chiefs F.C. and Royal Leopards F.C.. He earned 11 caps for the Swaziland national team.
