= Oren Ben-Dor =

Israeli legal scholar

Oren Ben-Dor (Hebrew: אורן בן דור) is a philosopher living in the UK. He is a former professor of law and philosophy at the University of Southampton School of Law in the United Kingdom. He has published two books on these topics and edited a third on the troubled relationship between law and art. His work has been published in various academic and mainstream publications.

He received his Bachelor of Laws from Birmingham University (1992), and his Master of Arts (1993) and Doctor of Philosophy (1997) from University College London.

He is currently writing two books, one which explores the notion of "place" and the limits of phenomenology and practical reason, and another on Palestine, in particular the relationship between the persistence of violence and existential fetters that pervade and reproduce this violence.

Ben-Dor was born in Nahariya, northern Israel. He has supported academic boycotts of Israel universities, writing that those on the Israeli "left" who oppose it are "sophisticated accomplices to the smothering of debate." He has written about alleged apartheid in Israel, bias in Israel's education system, the ethical and legal challenges facing Palestine, and the use of violence by the Israeli state.

In 2007, he joined a number of intellectuals and activists in signing a "One State Declaration" which calls for one democratic state in the whole of Israel and Palestine. He has supported that alternative in public debate. Ben-Dor has engaged in academic debate with Oren Yiftachel in the journal Holy Land Studies regarding the one-state solution.

== Bibliography ==
- Editor, Law and Art: Ethics, Aesthetics, Justice, Routledge Cavendish, 25 April 2010, ISBN 0-415-56021-7 ISBN 978-0415560214
- Review of A Stranger in the Land: Jewish Identity beyond Nationalism, Journal of Palestine Studies, Summer 2008, Vol. 37, No. 4, pp. 91–92
- Transcending Nationalism, Journal of Palestine Studies, Autumn 2007, Vol. 37, No. 1, pp. 112–113
- Debating Israeli Ethnocracy and the Challenge of Secular Democracy: I. A Critique of Oren Yiftachel, Holy Land Studies: A Multidisciplinary Journal, Volume 6, Number 2, November 2007
- Thinking About Law: In Silence With Heidegger, Hart Publishing (UK), September 2007, ISBN 1-84113-354-X ISBN 978-1841133546
- Book Review: "Catastrophe Remembered", Holy Land Studies: A Multidisciplinary Journal, Volume 6, Number 1, pp. 119–121, Edinburgh University Press, May 2007, E-ISSN 1750-0125 Print ISSN 1474-9475
- Challenging Core Immorality in Palestine: Philosophical Reflections on the Anti-Apartheid Struggle and the Current "Boycott of Israel" Debate, Journal of Holy Land and Palestine Studies, Volume 6, pp. 75–105, May 2007, Edinburgh University Press, ISSN 1474-9475.
- Constitutional Limits and Public Sphere: A Critical Study of Bentham's Constitutionalism, Hart Publishing (UK), March 2001, ISBN 1-84113-111-3 ISBN 978-1841131115
