= Fiorenzo Chatrer =

Dutch footballer

Personal information
- Date of birth: 1 October 1987 (age 39)
- Place of birth: Breda, Netherlands
- Height: 1.87 m (6 ft 2 in)
- Position: Striker

Youth career
- NAC
- VVV

Senior career*
Years	Team	Apps	(Gls)
2006-2007	FC Oss	1	(0)
- * Club domestic league appearances and goals

Fiorenzo Chatrer (born October 1, 1987, in Breda) is a Dutch retired footballer who played for Eerste Divisie club FC Oss during the 2006-2007 football season.

== Club career ==
Chatrer played in the NAC and VVV-Venlo youth systems and after leaving Oss he played for amateur sides Advendo, Rood Wit Sint Willibrord, JEKA and the Gunners.
