= Renat Sokolov =

Russian footballer

Personal information
- Full name: Renat Alekseyevich Sokolov
- Date of birth: 3 September 1984 (age 42)
- Place of birth: Orekhovo-Zuyevo, Russian SFSR
- Height: 1.84 m (6 ft 0 in)
- Position: Goalkeeper

Senior career*
Years	Team	Apps	(Gls)
2003–2009	FC Vityaz Podolsk	79	(0)
2010	FC SKA-Energiya Khabarovsk	1	(0)
2011–2014	FC Volga Ulyanovsk	63	(0)
2014–2015	FC Tyumen	29	(0)
2015–2016	FC SKA-Energiya Khabarovsk	0	(0)
2017	FC Veles Moscow	9	(0)
2018	FC Vityaz Podolsk (amateur)		
2018–2019	FC Znamya Truda Orekhovo-Zuyevo	9	(0)
- * Club domestic league appearances and goals

Renat Alekseyevich Sokolov (Russian: Ренат Алексеевич Соколов; born 3 September 1984) is a Russian former professional football player.

== Club career ==
He made his Russian Football National League debut for FC Vityaz Podolsk on 26 August 2008 in a game against FC KAMAZ Naberezhnye Chelny.
