= Andrei Bovtalo =

Russian footballer

Personal information
- Full name: Andrei Vladimirovich Bovtalo
- Date of birth: 3 January 1984 (age 42)
- Place of birth: Moscow, Russian SFSR, Soviet Union
- Height: 1.82 m (6 ft 0 in)
- Position: Midfielder

Youth career
- –2001: FC Dynamo Moscow

Senior career*
| Years | Team | Apps | (Gls) |
| 2002–2005 | FC Dynamo Moscow | 0 | (0) |
| 2004 | → FC Luch-Energiya Vladivostok (loan) | 21 | (0) |
| 2006 | FC Spartak Nizhny Novgorod | 21 | (0) |
| 2007 | FC Zelenograd | 15 | (0) |
| 2007–2008 | FC Dynamo St. Petersburg | 28 | (1) |
| 2008 | FC Zelenograd | 16 | (1) |
| 2009 | FC Spartak Kostroma | 17 | (0) |
| 2009–2010 | FC Zelenograd | 43 | (1) |
| 2011 | FC Sever Murmansk | 21 | (3) |
| 2011–2012 | FC Sheksna Cherepovets | 23 | (3) |
| 2013 | FC MITOS Novocherkassk | 5 | (0) |
| 2014 | FC Zelenograd (amateur) | | |
- * Club domestic league appearances and goals

Andrei Vladimirovich Bovtalo (Russian: Андрей Владимирович Бовтало; born 3 January 1984) is a former Russian football player.

== Club career ==
He made his Russian Football National League debut for FC Luch-Energiya Vladivostok on 24 July 2004 in a game against FC Anzhi Makhachkala.
