= Alim Khabilov =

Russian footballer

Personal information
- Full name: Alim Vladimirovich Khabilov
- Date of birth: 27 July 1984 (age 42)
- Height: 1.80 m (5 ft 11 in)
- Positions: Forward; midfielder

Senior career*
Years	Team	Apps	(Gls)
2003	FC Biokhimik-Mordovia Saransk	17	(0)
2005	PFC Spartak Nalchik	36	(3)
2006	FC Avangard Kursk	4	(0)
2006	FC Volga Tver	8	(1)
2007	FC Druzhba Maykop	24	(8)
2008–2009	FC Dynamo St. Petersburg	27	(7)
2010	FC Dynamo Kostroma	23	(8)
2011	FC Pskov-747 Pskov	6	(0)
2011–2012	FC Druzhba Maykop	18	(3)
2012	FC Kavkaztransgaz-2005 Ryzdvyany	3	(0)
- * Club domestic league appearances and goals

Alim Vladimirovich Khabilov (Russian: Алим Владимирович Хабилов; born 27 July 1984) is a former Russian professional football player.

== Club career ==
He played 2 seasons in the Russian Football National League for PFC Spartak Nalchik and FC Avangard Kursk.
