= Mario Ruyales =

Spanish footballer

Personal information
- Full name: Mario Fernández Ruyales
- Date of birth: 25 September 1984 (age 42)
- Place of birth: Madrid, Spain
- Height: 1.87 m (6 ft 2 in)
- Position: Goalkeeper

Youth career
- Leganés

Senior career*
Years	Team	Apps	(Gls)
2003–2005	Leganés B		
2005–2006	Atlético Madrid C		
2006–2008	Atlético Madrid B	23	(0)
2006–2007	→ Gimnástica (loan)	30	(0)
2008–2010	Sevilla B	35	(0)
2010–2011	Alicante	0	(0)
2011–2012	Palencia	27	(0)
2012–2013	Oviedo	0	(0)
2013	UCAM Murcia	10	(0)
- * Club domestic league appearances and goals

Mario Fernández Ruyales (born 25 September 1984) is a Spanish former footballer who played as a goalkeeper.

== Club career ==
Born in Madrid, Ruyales spent the vast majority of his career in the lower leagues. His professional input consisted of 18 Segunda División games in the 2008–09 season for Sevilla Atlético, his debut arriving on 9 November 2008 in a 2–2 away draw against Deportivo Alavés. He was also on goal on 5 April of the following year, as the team lost 0–8 at Hércules CF and was eventually relegated.

Ruyales also represented CD Leganés B, both reserve teams of Atlético Madrid, Gimnástica Torrelavega, Alicante CF, CF Palencia, Real Oviedo and UCAM Murcia CF.
