= Saylee Swen =

Liberian footballer

Personal information
- Full name: Saylee Swen
- Date of birth: February 29, 1984 (age 42)
- Place of birth: Monrovia, Liberia
- Height: 1.87 m (6 ft 2 in)
- Position: Goalkeeper

Team information
- Current team: LPRC Oilers
- Number: 1

Senior career*
| Years | Team | Apps | (Gls) |
| 2002 | Mighty Barolle | | |
| 2003–2004 | LPRC Oilers | | |
| 2005 | Mighty Barolle | | |
| 2006–2018 | LPRC Oilers | | |

International career^{‡}
| 2001–2015 | Liberia | 12 | (0) |
- * Club domestic league appearances and goals as of 13:42, 19 May 2009 (UTC) ‡ National team caps and goals as of 6 November 2019

Saylee Swen (born February 29, 1984) is a Liberian former footballer who played as a goalkeeper mainly for LPRC Oilers. He was also a member of the Liberia national team.
