= Fabrice Omonga =

Belgian footballer

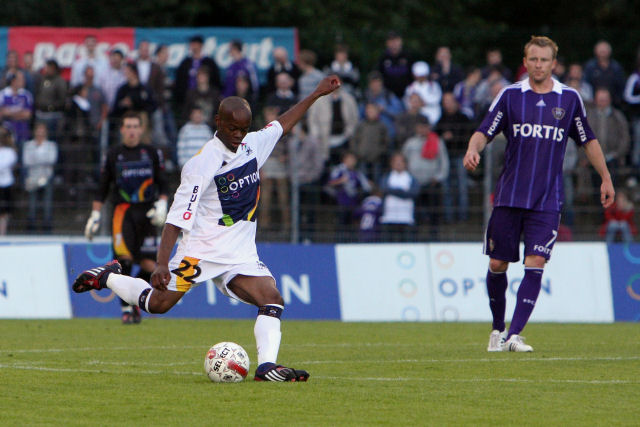
- Omonga in 2008

Personal information
- Full name: Fabrice Omonga Djadi
- Date of birth: 6 February 1984 (age 42)
- Place of birth: Kinshasa, Zaire
- Height: 1.83 m (6 ft 0 in)
- Positions: Defender; defensive midfielder

Youth career
- FC Seneffe
- 1993–1996: Sporting Charleroi
- 1996–1999: La Louvière
- 1999–2001: RWDM
- 2001–2003: Anderlecht
- 2003–2004: Standard Liège

Senior career*
Years	Team	Apps	(Gls)
2004–2007	Brussels	43	(1)
2007	→ OH Leuven (loan)	11	(1)
2007–2008	OH Leuven	25	(1)
2008–2009	WS Woluwe	25	(2)
2010	FC Couillet-La Louvière		
2010–2011	KRC Mechelen		
2011–2013	FC Charleroi		
- * Club domestic league appearances and goals as of 14 August 2012

Fabrice Omonga Djadi (born 6 February 1984) is a Belgian former footballer. He started his professional career with Brussels, enjoying over two seasons at the highest level of Belgian football, before moving to OH Leuven in the Belgian Second Division, first on loan, then permanently. Afterwards he moved to teams from lower divisions, including WS Woluwe and KRC Mechelen.
