= Sultan Khuranov =

Russian footballer

Personal information
- Full name: Sultan Borisovich Khuranov
- Date of birth: 4 April 1984 (age 42)
- Height: 1.87 m (6 ft 1 1/2 in)
- Positions: Defender; midfielder

Senior career*
| Years | Team | Apps | (Gls) |
| 2001 | PFC Spartak-2 Nalchik | | |
| 2002 | FC Terek Grozny | 1 | (0) |
| 2002 | FC Mashuk Pyatigorsk (amateur) | | |
| 2003 | FC Angusht Nazran | 21 | (1) |
| 2004 | PFC Spartak Nalchik | 9 | (0) |
| 2005 | FC Mashuk-KMV Pyatigorsk | 9 | (0) |
| 2005 | PFC Spartak Nalchik | 9 | (0) |
| 2008 | FC Mashuk-KMV Pyatigorsk | 13 | (0) |
| 2009–2010 | FC Angusht Nazran | 37 | (3) |
| 2011 | FC Neftyanik Neftekumsk | | |
| 2012 | FC Karelia-Discovery Petrozavodsk (amateur) | | |
- * Club domestic league appearances and goals

Sultan Borisovich Khuranov (Russian: Султан Борисович Хуранов; born 4 April 1984) is a former Russian professional football player.

== Club career ==
He made his Russian Football National League debut for PFC Spartak Nalchik on 28 March 2004 in a game against FC Luch-Energiya Vladivostok.
