= Giampietro Puppi =

Italian physicist

- Born: November 20, 1917
- Died: December 25, 2006 (aged 89)
- Known for: Theory of the weak interactions
- Scientific career
- Fields: Physics
- Institutions: Universities of Naples, Bologna, Bari, Rome, Padua

Giampetro Puppi (20 November 1917 – 25 December 2006) was an Italian physicist who is known for his contribution to the theory of weak interactions.

== Biography ==
Puppi was born in Bologna, Italy. He studied physics at the University of Padua close to Professor Bruno Rossi and Professor Giancarlo Wick. He graduated in 1939 and with the end of World War II, Puppi started to work in Italian Universities (Bari, Rome, Padua). In 1950 he became a Professor of Theoretical Physics in Naples and from 1952 until his retirement he was a Professor of Advanced Physics and Head of the Physics department in the University of Bologna.

== Career ==
He started his career as a theoretical physicist, but soon he gave in to experimental physics and the field of cosmic-rays.

His discovery 'Puppi's triangle', which represents the three processes of beta decay, muon decay and muon capture in nuclei, was the recognition to precursor's Enrico Fermi theory of interactions (Fermi's interactions) that all weak processes could be described by the same coupling.

Due to lack of equipment in Europe and in order to satisfy his interest in experimental physics, Puppi together with Italian and American physicists had been using Columbia University and the University of Chicago as their base to conduct experiments while the analysis was done in Italy. One of their great achievements was the study of pion interactions with hydrogen in photographic plates, in 1953.

The concept of parity violation in the decay of strange particles was also one of his proofs when he embraced in large bubble chamber collaborations.
Puppi was a research associate to many organisations and foundations for years with the peak of them being his role as the Directorate Member for Research in CERN, in 1963.
In his honour, the award "Premio Giampietro Puppi" is given annually to young physicists.

== Publications ==
Puppi, Giampietro (May 1949). "Sui mesoni dei raggi cosmici". Il Nuovo Cimento. 6 (3): 194–199. Bibcode:1949NCim....6..194P. doi:10.1007/bf02906898.
