= Christoph Holste =

German footballer

Personal information
- Date of birth: May 24, 1984 (age 42)
- Place of birth: Germany
- Position: Defensive midfielder

Youth career
- –1999: SV Gersweiler
- 1999–2001: 1. FC Saarbrücken

Senior career*
Years	Team	Apps	(Gls)
2001–2005	1. FC Saarbrücken II		
2003–2005	1. FC Saarbrücken	3	(0)
2006–2010	FC Homburg	113	(4)
2010–2012	SV Elversberg II	54	(5)
2011–2013	SV Elversberg	11	(0)
2013	SVN Zweibrücken		
- * Club domestic league appearances and goals as of June 30, 2013

Christoph Holste (born May 24, 1984) is a German footballer who plays as a defensive midfielder. He is currently a free agent.

== Career ==
Holste began his professional career with 1. FC Saarbrücken, where he made two appearances in the 2. Bundesliga, before being released in 2005. After six months out of the game, he signed for FC Homburg in January 2006, before leaving for SV Elversberg in 2010. He began in the club's reserve team, but was promoted to the first team squad in 2011. In 2013, he signed for SVN Zweibrücken.
