= Antonino Daì =

Italian footballer (born 1984)

Personal information
- Date of birth: 8 February 1984 (age 42)
- Place of birth: Salemi, Italy
- Height: 1.74 m (5 ft 8 1/2 in)
- Position: Defender

Senior career*
Years	Team	Apps	(Gls)
2003–2005	Carpi	0	(0)
2006–2007	Alcamo		
2007–2017	Trapani	30	(0)
- * Club domestic league appearances and goals as of 18 May 2017

Antonino Daì (born 8 February 1984) was an Italian football player.

== Club career ==
He made his professional debut in the Lega Pro for Trapani on 4 September 2011 in a game against Prato.
