= Silva (footballer, born 1984) =

Brazilian footballer

Personal information
- Full name: Weliander Silva Nascimento
- Date of birth: 6 August 1984 (age 42)
- Place of birth: Três Corações, Minas Gerais, Brazil
- Height: 1.78 m (5 ft 10 in)
- Position: Midfielder

Team information
- Current team: Duque de Caxias

Senior career*
Years	Team	Apps	(Gls)
2005–2007	Vasco da Gama	10	(0)
2007	→ Duque de Caxias (loan)	0	(0)
2008–2010	Duque de Caxias	16	(1)
2010–2011	Vitória de Setúbal	25	(1)
2011	→ Atlético CP (loan)	8	(1)
2012	Boa Esporte	0	(0)
2012	Icasa	2	(0)
2013–	Duque de Caxias		
- * Club domestic league appearances and goals as of 15 March 2013

Weliander Silva Nascimento (born 6 August 1984 in Três Corações, Minas Gerais), is a Brazilian footballer who plays for Duque de Caxias as a midfielder.
