= Derick Amadi =

Nigerian footballer

Personal information
- Date of birth: 10 March 1984 (age 42)
- Place of birth: Nigeria
- Height: 1.83 m (6 ft 0 in)
- Position: Forward

Team information
- Current team: Dolphins FC
- Number: 24

Youth career
- 1995–1998: Pepsi Football Academy
- 1998–2003: SC Freiburg

Senior career*
Years	Team	Apps	(Gls)
- SC Freiburg II
2005–2006	Sharks F.C.		
2006–2007	Enugu Rangers		
2008–2009	Heartland F.C.		
2009–	Dolphins FC		
- * Club domestic league appearances and goals

Derick Amadi (born 10 March 1984) is a Nigerian professional footballer who plays for Dolphins FC.

== Career ==
Amadi was named the 1997 Pepsi Football Academy of Nigeria's Most Valuable Player. On 13 March 2006, he moved to Sharks F.C. from the German-based club SC Freiburg. He moved later to Enugu Rangers before leaving the Enugu-based team in 2008 and joining Heartland F.C.

In February 2011, while playing for Dolphins FC, Amadi was voted and named in the Team of the Week" by the Nigerian Premier League. He played for them going into the 2012–13 seasons.
