= Jukka Veltheim =

Finnish footballer (born 1984)

Personal information
- Date of birth: 18 June 1984 (age 42)
- Place of birth: Finland
- Height: 1.81 m (5 ft 11 1/2 in)
- Position: Midfielder

Team information
- Current team: FC Lahti
- Number: 7

Youth career
- FC Kuusysi

Senior career*
Years	Team	Apps	(Gls)
2005	HyPS	3	(0)
2008	New Radiant SC		
2008	City Stars		
2008–2009	FC Lahti	14	(1)
2010	FC KooTeePee	2	(0)
2011–	FC Lahti	32	(1)
- * Club domestic league appearances and goals as of 28 May 2012

Jukka Veltheim (born 18 June 1984) is a Finnish football player currently playing for FC Lahti.

== See also ==
- Football in Finland
- List of football clubs in Finland
