= Nikolay Yefimov (footballer) =

Russian footballer

Personal information
- Full name: Nikolay Yevgenyevich Yefimov
- Date of birth: 23 January 1984 (age 42)
- Height: 1.83 m (6 ft 0 in)
- Position: Defender

Youth career
- Smena-Zenit

Senior career*
Years	Team	Apps	(Gls)
2002	Zenit-2 St. Petersburg	29	(0)
2003–2004	Zenit St. Petersburg	0	(0)
2006	Zenit-2 St. Petersburg	14	(2)
2006	Metallurg-Kuzbass Novokuznets	10	(0)
2006–2008	Zenit-2 St. Petersburg	26	(8)
- * Club domestic league appearances and goals

Nikolay Yevgenyevich Yefimov (Russian: Николай Евгеньевич Ефимов; born 23 January 1984) is a former Russian football defender.

== Career ==
Yefimov spent two seasons with Zenit U-21 team. He made his professional debut for Zenit on 5 September 2003 in the Russian Premier League Cup semi-final against Torpedo Moscow. From 2006 to 2008 he played for a number of Russian Second Division clubs including Metallurg-Kuzbass and Zenit-2.
