= Luciën Dors =

Dutch footballer

Personal information
- Full name: Luciën Dors
- Date of birth: 31 October 1984 (age 41)
- Place of birth: Zeist, Netherlands
- Position: Winger

Youth career
- VV Jonathan

Senior career*
Years	Team	Apps	(Gls)
2004–2005	Vitesse	5	(0)
2005–2006	FC Den Bosch	31	(0)
2008–2010	DOVO		
2010–2013	Bennekom		
2013–2015	Breukelen		
2015–2019	DFS		
2019–2022	Maarssen		

International career
1999	Netherlands U15	1	(0)
- * Club domestic league appearances and goals

Luciën Dors (born 31 October 1984 in Zeist) is a Dutch retired footballer.

== Club career ==
A left-sided winger, Dors made his professional debut for Vitesse in a December 2004 Eredivisie match against FC Utrecht. He later played for Eerste Divisie club FC Den Bosch during the 2005-2006 football season.

He later played for senior amateur sides DOVO and Bennekom. He joined DFS from Breukelen in summer 2015. Ahead of the 2019/20 season, he joined VV Maarssen.

== International career ==
Dors was capped once for the Netherlands national under-15 football team
