= Abdoulahy Sangaré =

Mauritanian footballer (born 1984)

Personal information
- Date of birth: 14 January 1984 (age 42)
- Place of birth: Épinay-sur-Seine, France
- Position: Defender

Team information
- Current team: Poissy

Senior career*
Years	Team	Apps	(Gls)
2006–2008	Levallois		
2008–2009	Saint-Leu		
2011–2012	Le Blanc-Mesnil		
2012–2013	Paris Saint-Germain B	15	(0)
2013–	Poissy		

International career^{‡}
2013–	Mauritania	7	(0)
- * Club domestic league appearances and goals as of 10:01, 9 August 2015 (UTC) ‡ National team caps and goals as of 10:01, 9 August 2015 (UTC)

Abdoulahy Sangaré (born 14 January 1984) is a Mauritanian international footballer who plays for French club Poissy, as a defender.

== Career ==
Born in Épinay-sur-Seine, France, Sangaré has played club football for Levallois, Saint-Leu, Le Blanc-Mesnil, Paris Saint-Germain B and Poissy.

He made his international debut for Mauritania in 2013.
