= Luca Carretto =

Italian footballer

Personal information
- Full name: Luca Carretto
- Date of birth: 10 August 1984 (age 42)
- Place of birth: Rivoli, Italy
- Height: 1.86 m (6 ft 1 in)
- Position: Centre back

Team information
- Current team: RapalloBogliasco

Senior career*
Years	Team	Apps	(Gls)
–2003	Ivrea	31	(0)
2003–2004	Juventus	0	(0)
2004–2007	Giaveno	89	(4)
2007–2011	Canavese	97	(5)
2011–2013	Cuneo	44	(0)
2013–	RapalloBogliasco	15	(0)
- * Club domestic league appearances and goals

Luca Carretto (born 10 August 1984 in Rivoli) is an Italian footballer. He currently plays for RapalloBogliasco.
