= Florian Bague =

French football goalkeeper (born 1984)

Personal information
- Date of birth: 27 July 1984 (age 42)
- Place of birth: Besançon, France
- Height: 1.80 m (5 ft 11 in)
- Position: Goalkeeper

Senior career*
Years	Team	Apps	(Gls)
2004–2005	CO Châlons	34	(0)
2005–2012	Boulogne	84	(0)
2013–2014	Luçon	15	(0)
2013	Le Touquet		
2015–2017	Calais RUFC	31	(0)
- * Club domestic league appearances and goals

Florian Bague (born 27 July 1984) is a French former professional footballer who played as a goalkeeper.

== Career ==
Bague was born in Besançon. He began his career at CO Châlons. In 2005, he joined Ligue 2 side US Boulogne and spent seven years playing for the club until June 2012.
