= Rowan Taylor (footballer) =

Montserratian footballer

Rowan Taylor (born 8 November 1984) is an international footballer from Montserrat who has two caps for the national team. Taylor, who was born in North London, England, plays as a striker for Cockfosters.
