= Marko Balažic =

Slovenian footballer

Personal information
- Date of birth: 31 July 1984 (age 41)
- Place of birth: Slovenia
- Position: Defender

Senior career*
Years	Team	Apps	(Gls)
2000-2005	Mura	8	(0)
2002-2004	Tromejnik	45	(3)
2005-2009	Mura	93	(11)
2009-2010	Drava Ptuj	30	(0)
2010-2011	Nafta Lendava	19	(0)
2011	Irtysh Pavlodar	11	(0)
2012-2023	USV St. Anna am Aigen	246	(24)
20xx-2016	KMN Mladinec		
- * Club domestic league appearances and goals

Marko Balazic (born 31 July 1984 in Slovenia) is a Slovenian retired footballer who played the majority of his career for USV St. Anna am Aigen in Austria.

== Career ==
Balazic started his senior career with NK Mura in 2000. In 2011, he signed for Irtysh Pavlodar in the Kazakhstan Premier League, where he made fifteen appearances and scored zero goals. After that, he played for Slovenian club KMN Mladinec and Austrian club USV St. Anna am Aigen, where he plays now.
