= Roman Markelov =

Russian footballer

Personal information
- Full name: Roman Nikolayevich Markelov
- Date of birth: 16 July 1984 (age 42)
- Height: 1.83 m (6 ft 0 in)
- Positions: Midfielder; forward

Senior career*
Years	Team	Apps	(Gls)
2003	FC Zhemchuzhina Sochi	6	(1)
2004	FC Rodnik Alekseyevskaya		
2005	FC Sochi-04	0	(0)
2006	FC Dynamo Makhachkala	4	(0)
2007	FC Okean Nakhodka	24	(2)
2008	FC Sochi-04	10	(0)
2009	FC Zhemchuzhina-Sochi	14	(1)
2011–2012	FC Mashuk-KMV Pyatigorsk	34	(2)
2015	FC Fisht-2 Sochi		
- * Club domestic league appearances and goals

Roman Nikolayevich Markelov (Russian: Роман Николаевич Маркелов; born 16 July 1984) is a former Russian professional football player.

== Club career ==
He played in the Russian Football National League for FC Dynamo Makhachkala in 2006.
