= Giampietro Cicoria =

Swiss footballer (born 1984)

Personal information
- Date of birth: 15 July 1984 (age 42)
- Place of birth: Switzerland
- Height: 1.78 m (5 ft 10 in)
- Position: Defender

Team information
- Current team: Emmenbrücke

Senior career*
Years	Team	Apps	(Gls)
2003–2005	FC Lucerne	23	(0)
2005–2007	FC Kickers Lucerne	48	(3)
2007–2008	SC Cham	0	(0)
2008–	Emmenbrücke		
- * Club domestic league appearances and goals

Giampietro Cicoria (born 15 July 1984) is a Swiss professional footballer who plays as a defender. His clubs include SC Cham, Emmenbrücke, FC Lucerne and FC Kickers Lucerne.
